= Hong Kong New Wave =

Film movement in Chinese language cinema

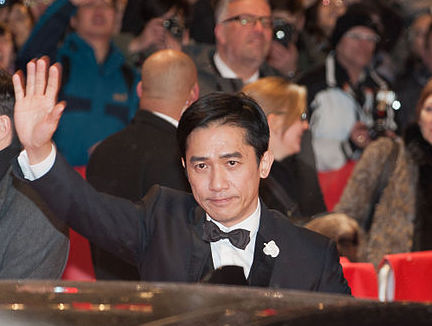
- New Wave actor Tony Leung Chiu-wai
- Years active: late 1970s to present
- Location: Hong Kong
- Influences: Golden Age Chinese Cinema, French New Wave
- Influenced: South Korean New Wave, American Independent cinema, Hollywood,

The Hong Kong New Wave is a film movement in Chinese-language Hong Kong cinema that emerged in the late 1970s and lasted through the early 2000s until the present time.

== Origins of the movement ==
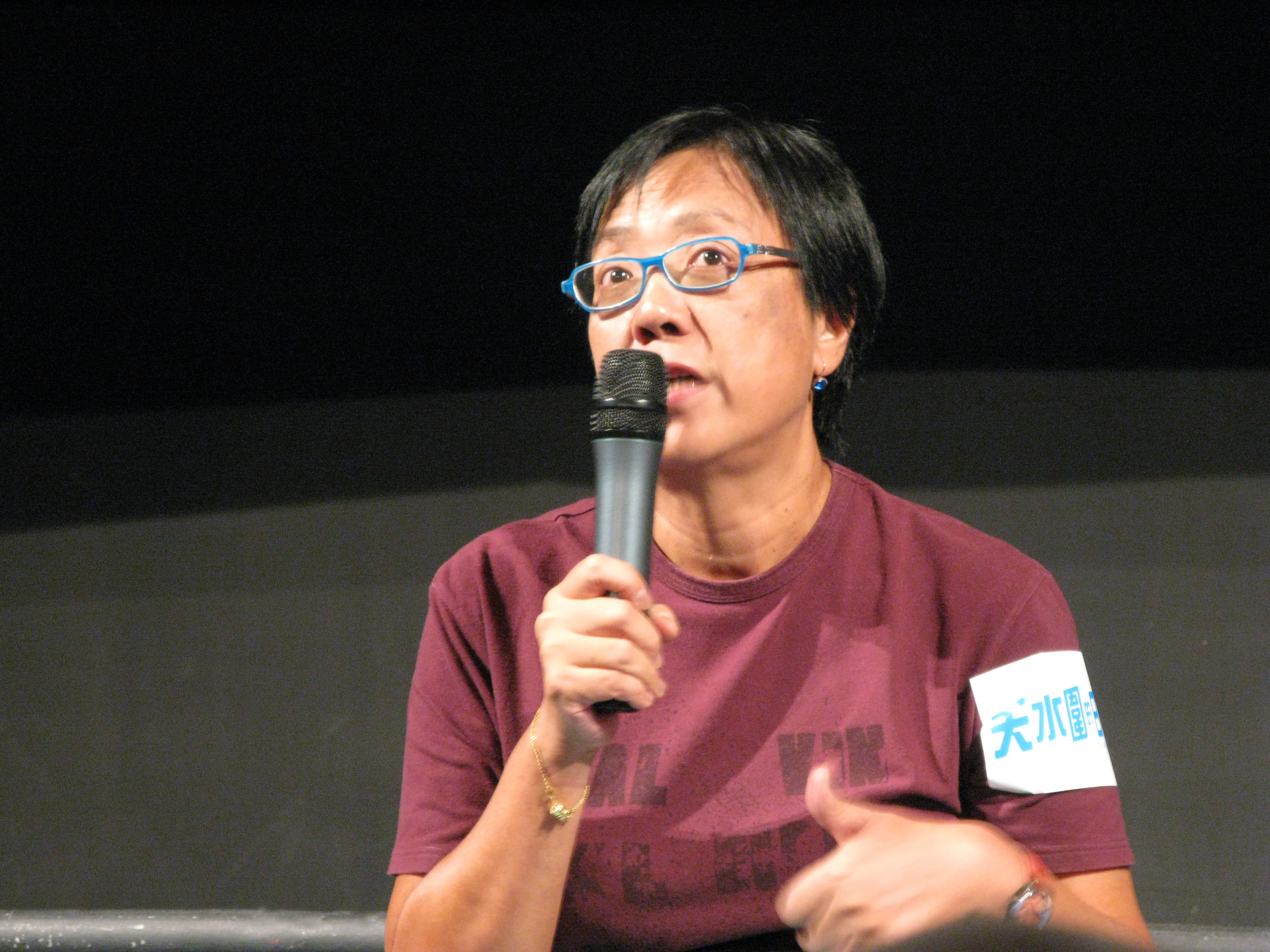
Ann Hui was among the Hong Kong New Wave

The Hong Kong New Wave started in 1979 with the release of numerous notable films. During the 1980s, the Hong Kong film industry began to flourish. Film emerged as the most popular form of entertainment in Hong Kong, in part because many Chinese households did not have a TV at the time. Many of the New Wave directors had a Western-style education and were influenced by western filmmaking and culture. The films of the Hong Kong New Wave were not stylistically homogenous; rather, the term was used to mark the distinction of a new generation of filmmakers. Films of the Hong Kong New Wave utilized new technology and techniques such as synchronous sound, new editing techniques, and filming movies on location.

== First Wave and Second Wave ==
The Hong Kong New Wave is considered to have two distinct periods. The first period, also called the "Hong Kong New Wave" or alternatively called the "First Wave", began in the late 1970s and lasted into the mid to late 1980s. The second period, called the "Second New Wave", is considered to have begun in 1984. Directors of the Second New Wave include Stanley Kwan, Wong Kar-wai, Mabel Cheung, Alex Law, Fruit Chan, Peter Chan, and Tammy Cheung.

=== First Wave ===
- Cops and Robbers (Alex Cheung Kwok-ming, 1979)
- The Secret (Ann Hui, 1979)
- The Butterfly Murders (Tsui Hark, 1979)
- The Spooky Bunch (Ann Hui, 1980)
- We're Going to Eat You (Tsui Hark, 1980)
- Dangerous Encounters of the First Kind (Tsui Hark, 1980)
- The Sword (Patrick Tam, 1980)
- Father and Son (Allen Fong, 1981)
- Love Massacre (Patrick Tam, 1981)
- The Club (Kirk Wong, 1981)
- All the Wrong Clues for the Right Solution (Tsui Hark, 1981)
- The Story of Woo Viet (Ann Hui, 1981)
- The Imp (Dennis Yu, 1981)
- Boat People (Ann Hui, 1982)
- Lonely Fifteen (David Lai, 1982)
- Nomad (Patrick Tam, 1982)
- Zu Warriors from the Magic Mountain (Tsui Hark, 1983)
- Health Warning (Kirk Wong, 1983)
- Ah Ying (Allen Fong, 1983)
- Hong Kong, Hong Kong (Clifford Choi, 1983)
- Homecoming (Yim Ho, 1984)
- Love in a Fallen City (Ann Hui, 1984)
- Shanghai Blues (Tsui Hark, 1984)

=== Second Wave ===
- The Illegal Immigrant (Mabel Cheung, 1985)
- A Better Tomorrow (John Woo, 1986)
- Love Unto Waste (Stanley Kwan, 1986)
- An Autumn's Tale (Mabel Cheung, 1987)
- Rouge (Stanley Kwan, 1987)
- As Tears Go By (Wong Kar Wai, 1988)
- Days of Being Wild (Wong Kar Wai, 1990)
- Cageman (Jacob Cheung, 1992)
- Chungking Express (Wong Kar Wai, 1994)
- Fallen Angels (Wong Kar-wai, 1995)
- Happy Together (Wong Kar-wai, 1997)
- Made in Hong Kong (Fruit Chan, 1997)
- Infernal Affairs (Andrew Lau and Alan Mak, 2002)

== Notable directors ==
- Alex Cheung Kwok Ming (章國明)
- Allen Fong (方育平)
- Ann Hui (許鞍華)
- Clifford Choi (蔡繼光)
- Dennis Yu (余允抗)
- Fruit Chan (陳果)
- John Woo (吳宇森)
- Kirk Wong (黃志強)
- Patrick Tam (譚家明)
- Tsui Hark (徐克)
- Wong Kar-wai (王家衛)
- Yim Ho (嚴浩)
