= 2nd Hong Kong Film Awards =

1983 Hong Kong Film Awards

- Date: 31 August 1983
- Hosted by: Eric Tsang and Josephine Siao

The 2nd Hong Kong Film Awards presentation ceremony, honored the best films of 1982 and took place in Hong Kong Baptist University, Academic Community Hall, Kowloon Tong, Hong Kong on 31 August 1983 at 8 pm. The ceremony was hosted by Eric Ng and Zhan Xiaoping, during the ceremony awards are presented in 13 categories. The ceremony was sponsored by Sing Tao Newspapers Limited and City Entertainment Magazine.

== Awards ==
Winners are listed first, highlighted in boldface, and indicated with a double dagger (‡).

Winners in 1983

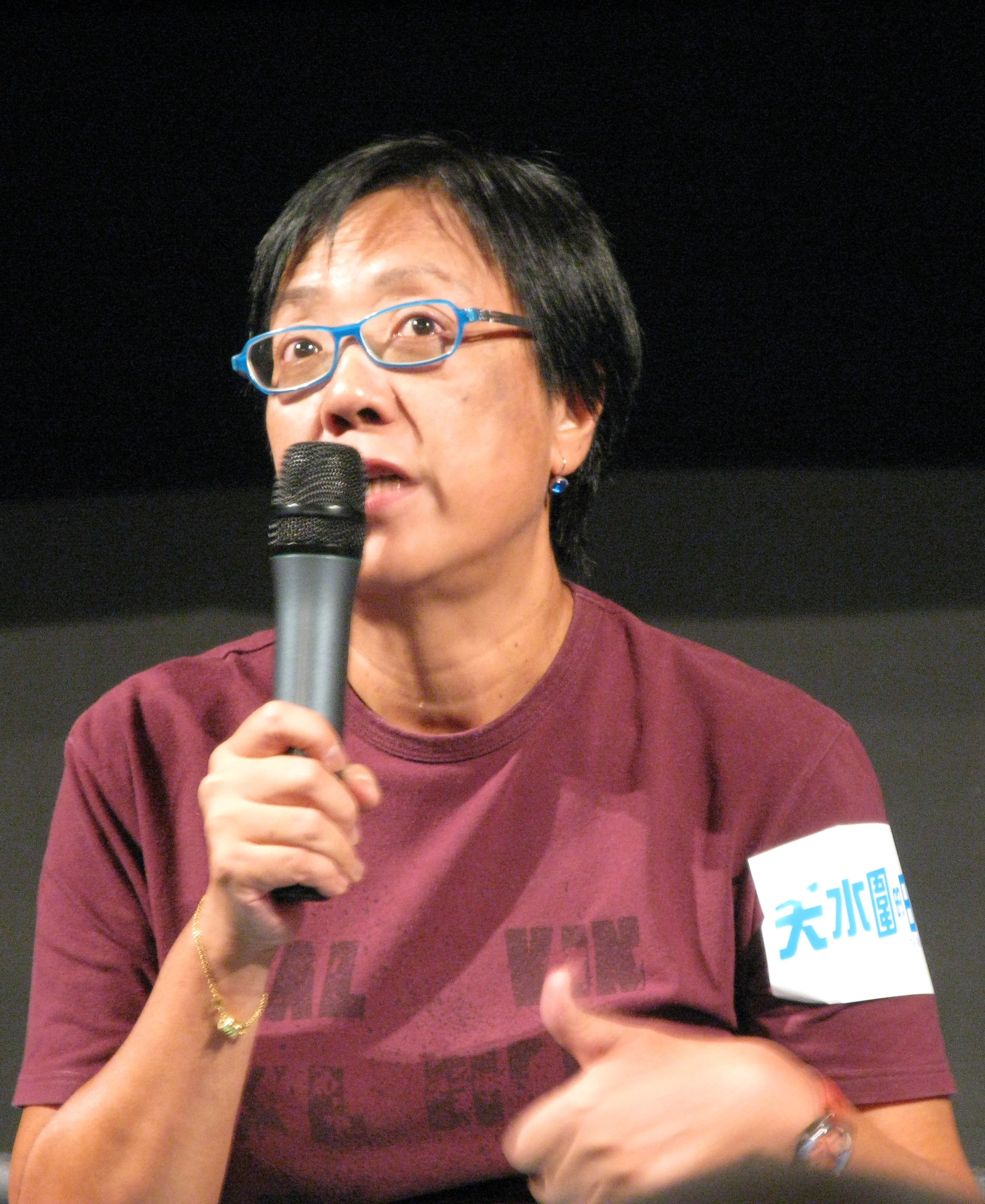
Ann Hui, Best Director winner

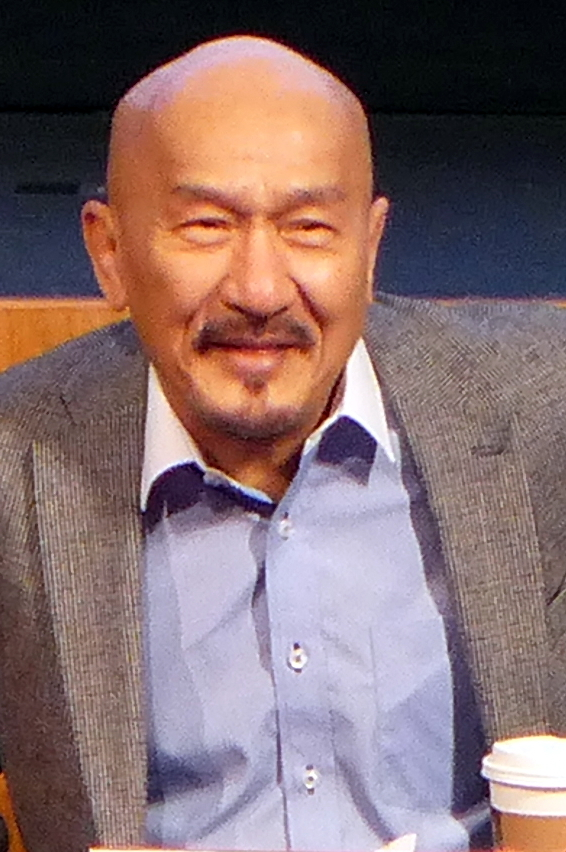
Karl Maka, Best Actor winner

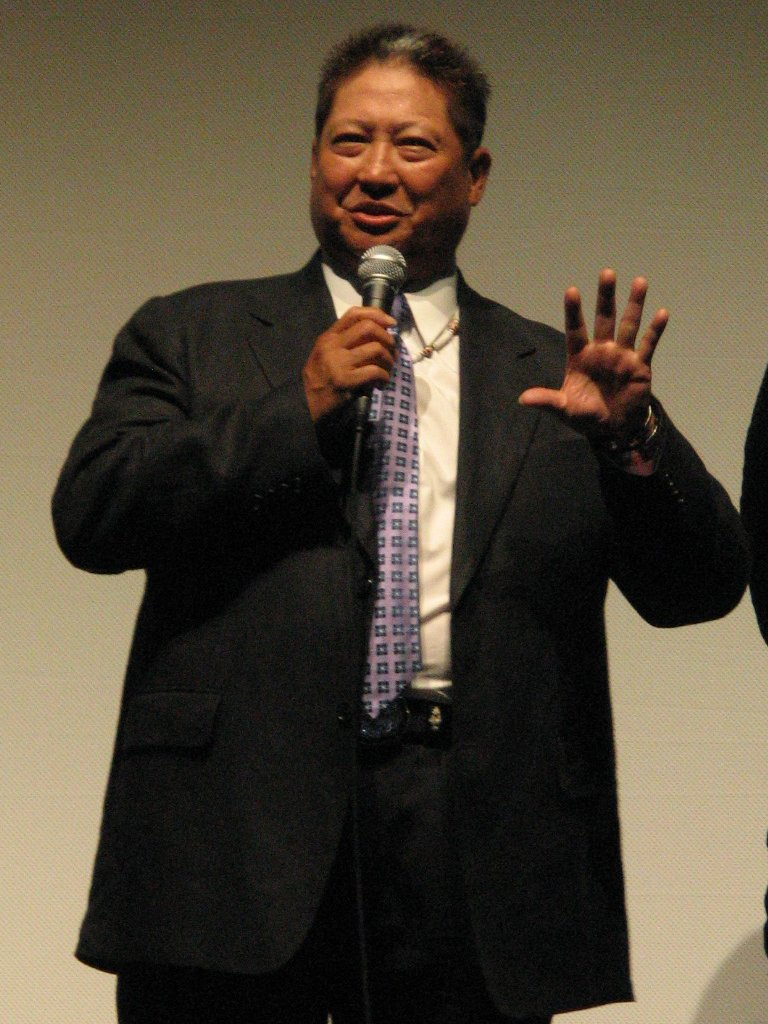
Sammo Hung, Best Actor and Action Direction winner

**Best Film**: **Boat People – Xia Meng, producer**‡; Nomad – Dennis Yu and Jeffrey Lau, producers; Lonely Fifteen – Johhny Mak, producer; Coolie Killer – Dennis Yu and Jeffrey Lau, producers; Prodigal Son – Raymond Chow, producer	**Best Director**: **Ann Hui – Boat People**‡; David Lai – Lonely Fifteen; Patrick Tam Kar-Ming – Nomad; Choi Gai-Kwong – Teenage Dreamers; Sammo Hung – Prodigal Son
**Best Actor**: **Karl Maka – Aces Go Places**‡; **Sammo Hung – Carry On Pickpocket**‡; Chan Wai-Man – Crimson Street; George Lam – Boat People; Leslie Cheung – Nomad	**Best Actress**: **Lam Pik-Kei – Lonely Fifteen**‡; Sylvia Chang – Aces Go Place; Cherie Chung – Eclipse; Cora Miao – Boat People; Ma Si-San – Boat People
**Best New Performer**: **Ma Si-San – Boat People**‡; Andy Lau – Boat People; Chow Sau-Lan – Teenage Dreamers; Cecilia Yip – Nomad; Pat Ha – Nomad; Irene Wan – Lonely Fifteen; Irene Wan – Happy Sixteen	**Best Screenplay**: Dai An-Ping **— Boat People**‡; Yau Kong-Kin, Chan Koon-Chung, Chan Wan-Man, Eddie Fong Ling-Ching, Patrick Tam Kar-Ming, Kam Ping-Hing – Nomad; Manfred Wong – Lonely Fifteen; Lee Pik-Wah – Once Upon a Mirage; Li Han-Xiang – Tiger Killer
**Best Cinematography**: **Arthur Wong – He Lives by Night**‡; Lai Sui-Ming, David Chung Chi-Man – Coolie Killer; Wong Chung-Biu – Nomad; Tong Bo-Sang – Lonely Fifteen; Arthur Wong – Life After Life	**Best Film Editing**: **Chow Kwok-Chung – He Lives by Night**‡; Kin Kin – Boat People; David Wu Dai-Wai – Coolie Killer; Chow Kwok-Chung – Life After Life; Mak Family Editing Group – Lonely Fifteen
**Best Art Direction**: **Tony Au Ting-Ping – Boat People**‡; Yee Chung-Man, William Cheung Suk-Ping – It Takes Two; William Chang Suk Ping – Nomad; Wong Yui-Man – Life After Life; Wong Yui-Man – He Lives by Night	**Best Action Direction**: **Sammo Hung, Lam Ching-Ying, Yuen Biao, Billy Chan – Prodigal Son**‡; Jackie Chan, Corey Yuen Kwai, Fung Hak-On – Dragon Lord; Corey Yuen Kwai, Mang Hoi – Ninja in the Dragon's Den; Lau Kar-Leung, King Chue, Siu Hau – Legendary Weapons of China; Yuen Woo-Ping, Brandy Yuen Chun-Yeung, Yuen Sun-Yi, Yuen Cheung-Yan, Yuen Yat-Choh, Chiu Chung-Hing— The Miracle Fighters; Ma Yin-Tat, Poon Ching-Fuk, Wong Seung-Hoi, Yu Hoi – Shaolin Temple**
**Best Original Film Score**: **Chris Babida – Life After Life**‡; Teddy Robin Kwan – Aces Go Places; Law Wing-Fai – Boat People; Chuk Hang-Him – Soul of the Wind; Lam Man-Yi – Nomad	**Best Original Film Song**: **Composer/Lyrics: Sam Hui • Singer: Sam Hui – Aces Go Places**‡; Composer: Chan Chau-Ha • Lyrics- Lam Chun-Keung • Singer- Lo Wan-Na – Happy Sixteen; Composer: Nip On-Tat • Lyrics: Peter Lai Bei-Tak • Singer: Alan Tam – My Darling, My Goddess; Composer: Teddy Robin Kwan • Lyrics: Raymond Wong Bak-Ming • Singer: Alan Tam – Till Death Do We Scare; Composer: Lam Man-Yi • Singer: Lui On-Na – Once Upon a Rainbow
**Lifetime Achievement**: **Run Run Shaw**‡
