= Love in a Fallen City =

Love in a Fallen City may refer to:

- Love in a Fallen City (novella), a 1943 Chinese novella by Eileen Chang
- Love in a Fallen City (film), a 1984 Hong Kong film based on the novella
- Love in a Fallen City (TV series), a 2009 Chinese TV series based on the novella
