= 17th Golden Horse Awards =

Award ceremony for Chinese-language films of 1979 and 1980

- Date: November 3, 1980
- Site: Sun Yat-sen Memorial Hall, Taipei, Taiwan
- Hosted by: Chiang Kuang-chao and Sylvia Chang
- Organized by: Taipei Golden Horse Film Festival Executive Committee

Highlights
- Best Feature Film: Good Morning, Taipei
- Best Director: Wang Chu-chin; The Legend of the Six Dynasty
- Best Actor: Wang Kuan-hsiung; Free or Die
- Best Actress: Hsu Feng; The Pioneers
- Most awards: The Orientation (3); The Secret (3)
- Most nominations: Magnificent 72 (6); The Pioneers (6)

The 17th Golden Horse Awards (Mandarin:第17屆金馬獎) took place on November 3, 1980 at the Sun Yat-sen Memorial Hall in Taipei, Taiwan.

== Winners and nominees ==
Winners are listed first and highlighted in boldface.

**Best Feature Film**: **Good Morning, Taipei**; The Legend of the Six Dynasty (runner-up); The Pioneers (runner-up - mention); The Heroes (runner-up - mention); Free or Die (runner-up - mention); Those Days in the Heaven (runner-up - mention); The Battle of Guningtou (runner-up - mention); Magnificent 72 (runner-up); The Secret (runner-up); The Orientation (runner-up); Story of a Repentant Juvenile (runner-up); The Giant of Casino (runner-up - mention)	**Best Documentary**: **Ancient House - Chinese Traditional Architecture**; Guo Ju Yi Shu (runner-up); Zuo Gu Lian Ti Nan Ying Fen Ge Shou Shu (runner-up); Shi Da Jian She Zhi Yi Di Gao Su Gong Lu Gong Cheng (runner-up - mention); War of the Century (runner-up - mention); Departure Herald and Return Clearing (runner-up - mention); Traditional Town - Meinong (runner-up - mention); Wu Tai Chun Xiao (runner-up - mention)
**Best Animation** **(runner-up)**: **Romance of the Three Kingdoms 三國演義**; Ding Ding Meng You Ji 丁丁夢遊記	**Best Director**: **Wang Chu-chin — The Legend of the Six Dynasty**; Ann Hui — The Secret; Ting Shan-hsi — Magnificent 72
**Best Leading Actor**: **Wang Kuan-hsiung — Free or Die**; Wang Dao — The Pioneers; Ti Lung — The Heroes	**Best Leading Actress**: **Hsu Feng — The Pioneers**; Brigitte Lin — Magnificent 72; Sylvia Chang — Free or Die
**Best Supporting Actor**: **Heung Wan-pang — The Orientation**; Li Hsiao-fei — Gunshot At 6 in the Morning; Chiang Ming — Good Morning, Taipei	**Best Supporting Actress**: **Shao Pei-ling — Free or Die**; Chen Chiu-yen — Lover on the Wave; Yang Jo-lan — To You with Love
**Best Child Star**: **Lin Hsiao-lao — The Orientation**; Huang Ying-hsun — The Beloved Grass; Chen Jun-jie — Good Morning, Taipei	**Best Original Screenplay**: **Sung Hsiang-ju — To You with Love**; Wang Chu-chin and Kuan Yun-loong — The Legend of the Six Dynasty; Joyce Chan — The Secret
**Best Adapted Screenplay**: **Liu Cheng-chien — The Giant of Casino**; Hou Hsiao-hsien — Good Morning, Taipei; Chang Yung-hsiang and Chang Yi — The Pioneers	**Best Cinematography**: **David Chung — The Secret**; Wang Chu-chin — Those Days in the Heaven; Lin Wen-chin — The Pioneers
**Best Film Editing**: **Hamilton Yu — The Secret**; Peter Cheung — The Young Master; Yu Siu-fung and Chiang Hsing-lung — The Kung Fu Instructor	**Best Art Direction**: **Chang Chi-ping — The Pioneers**; Yuan Kuang-ming — Those Days in the Heaven; Chang Pei-shing — The Orientation
**Best Original Film Score** **(no winner)**: Yang Ping-chung — Magnificent 72; Wong Mau-san — The Legend of the Six Dynasty; Wang Chu-chin — Those Days in the Heaven	**Best Original Film Song** **(no winner)**: "Good Morning, Taipei" — Good Morning, Taipei; Composer： Weng Ching-hsi; Lyrics: Sun Yi; "Big Rooster" — The Orientation; Composer： Wen Lung-chun; Lyrics: Chang Pei-shing; "Blood-Stained Flowers" — Magnificent 72; Composer： Yang Ping-chung; Lyrics: Ting Shan-hsi
**Best Sound Recording**: **Hsin Chiang-sheng — The Battle of Guningtou**; Lin Kun-chi — The Legend of the Six Dynasty; Wang Yung-fang — Magnificent 72	**Best Cinematography for Documentary**: **Chang Chao-Tang - Ancient House - Chinese Traditional Architecture**; Lai Yung-hsin — Guo Ju Yi Shu; Chang Chao-Tang — Traditional Town - Meinong
**Best Planning for Documentary**: **Lee Shu-chin — Guo Ju Yi Shu**; Teng Wei-hsing — War of the Century; Hung Lao-tien — Traditional Town - Meinong	**Best Director for Animated Film** **(no winner)**: Tsai Ming-chin — Romance of the Three Kingdoms 三國演義; Huang Mu-tsun — Ding Ding Meng You Ji 丁丁夢遊記
**Merit Award for Planning**: **The Battle of Guningtou**
