= Night and Fog (2009 film) =

2009 Hong Kong film by Ann Hui

- Directed by: Ann Hui
- Written by: Cheung King Wai; Alex Law
- Produced by: Ann Hui; Angela Wong; Jing Wong
- Starring: Simon Yam; Zhang Jingchu; Jacqueline Law; Amy Chum; Audrey Chan; Ariel Chan
- Cinematography: Charlie Lam
- Music by: Chan Si Lok
- Release date: 14 May 2009
- Running time: 122 minutes

Night and Fog (Chinese: 天水圍的夜與霧) is a 2009 Hong Kong film directed by Ann Hui. Based on a real murder-suicide case in Tin Shui Wai in 2004, the film attempts to raise awareness of some issues related to new immigrants in Hong Kong. The film stars Simon Yam as Lee Sum, the abusive husband, and Zhang Jingchu as Wong Hiu-ling, his wife. It is the second and final volume of Ann Hui's Tin Shui Wai series, the first one being The Way We Are.

The film premiered at the 2009 Hong Kong International Film Festival on 22 March (along with Shinjuku Incident) and 31 March. It was on wide release in Hong Kong from 14 May 2009.

== Awards and nominations ==
29th Hong Kong Film Awards

- Nominated: Best Director (Ann Hui)
- Nominated: Best Actor (Simon Yam)
- Nominated: Best Actress (Zhang Jingchu)

Granada Film Festival Cines del Sur (2010)

- Winner (Special Jury Mention): Best Actor (Simon Yam)
- Nominated: Golden Alhambra (Ann Hui)

Hong Kong Film Critics Society Awards (2010)

- Nominated (HKFCS Award): Best Actor (Simon Yam)
- Nominated (HKFCS Award): Best Actress (Zhang Jingchu)

Tokyo International Film Festival (2009)

- Nominated: Best Asian-Middle Eastern Film Award (Ann Hui)

Vesoul Asian Film Festival (2010)

- Nominated: Golden Wheel (Ann Hui)

To Ten Chinese Films Festival (2010)

- Winner (Youth Film Handbook Award): Top Ten Films (Ann Hui)
