= Zodiac Killers =

1991 Hong Kong film by Ann Hui

- Film poster
- Traditional Chinese: 極道追踪
- Simplified Chinese: 极道追踪
- Hanyu Pinyin: Jí Dào Zhuī Zōng
- Jyutping: Gik6 Dou6 Zeoi1 Zung1
- Directed by: Ann Hui
- Screenplay by: Raymond To; Wu Nien-jen
- Produced by: Eric Tsang
- Starring: Andy Lau; Cherie Chung; Junichi Ishida
- Cinematography: David Chung
- Edited by: David Wu; Kam Ma
- Music by: Wong Sze-yuen
- Production companies: Friend Cheers Limited; Paragon Films
- Distributed by: Golden Harvest
- Release date: 20 July 1991
- Running time: 95 minutes
- Country: Hong Kong
- Languages: Cantonese; Japanese
- Box office: HK$9,081,083

Zodiac Killers is a 1991 Hong Kong action thriller drama film directed by Ann Hui and starring Andy Lau, Cherie Chung and Junichi Ishida.

The inspiration of Zodiac Killers came from the case of a mainland Chinese female student studying abroad in Japan who died when she fell onto the tracks. Zodiac Killers is Hong Kong New Wave's representative Ann Hui's first attempt at making a commercial film, which, however, did not perform very well at the local box office.

== Plot ==
Hong Kong student Ben Lee becomes friends with his mainland Chinese classmate Chang Chih while studying abroad in Japan. Ben is unmotivated to study and only cares about money and on the other hand, whenever Chih encounters a Chinese person, he would ask whereabouts of his childhood sweetheart. Ben and Chih's friend, Ming, is also from Hong Kong and in order to elevate his social status, he becomes involved with a bar hostess and owner Yuriko, hoping to become Yakuza leader Yamada Ishikawa's brother in-law.

In Yuriko's bar, Ben encounters Chinese student Mang Tit-lan, who is there to earn some extra money, and falls in love with her at first sight but is not favored. Tit-lan and her friend Mei-mei live with their guarantor and suffers a lot of humiliation.

Tit-lan is in love with Hideyuki Asano, who works as Yamada's top assassin, who went to South America to kill Yamada's enemy, but eventually came back to reunite with Tit-lan. However, Yamada send his men to have Asano silenced and right before he dies, he asks Tit-lan to expose Yamada to the police but Tit-lan faces the underworld's pursue to kill her.

Since Tit-lan's passport was detained by her guarantor, Ben had to help her sneak out of Japan on a boat, but the thugs arrive right after hearing the news. Ben and Tit-lan attempt to leave the oppressing country.

== Cast ==
- Andy Lau as Ben Lee
- Cherie Chung as Mang Tit-lan
- Junichi Ishida as Hideyuki Asano
- Kyoko Kishida Old geisha Miyako (cameo)
- Takazawa Zunko as Yuriko
- Yasuaki Kurata as Yamada Ishikawa (cameo)
- Tou Chung-hua as Chang Chih
- Suen Pang as Ming
- Law Fei-yu as Harada
- Tsang Wai-fai as Mei-mei

== Theme song ==
- Red Dream (紅塵夢)
  - Composer: Wong Sze-yuen
  - Lyricist: Thomas Chow
  - Singer: Andy Lau

== Release ==
Considering its large budget for this commercial film compared to Ann Hui's other art films, Zodiac Killers grossed a disappointing HK$9,081,083 during its theatrical run from 20 July to 8 August 1991 in Hong Kong.

== Reception ==
Ben Sachs of the Chicago Reader wrote, "As an action movie, this is just fine [..] But as a portrait of cultural displacement, this is evocative and sometimes very moving."

=== Awards and nominations ===
Ceremony	Category	Recipient	Result
28th Golden Horse Film Festival and Awards	Best Supporting Actor	Tou Chung-hua	Nominated
28th Golden Horse Film Festival and Awards	Best Cinematography	David Chung	Nominated
28th Golden Horse Film Festival and Awards	Best Insert Music	Wong Sze-yuen	Nominated

== See also ==
- Andy Lau filmography
