= 22nd Golden Eagle Awards =

Chinese TV awards ceremony in 2006

The 22nd Golden Eagle Awards were held September 26, 2006, in Changsha, Hunan province. Nominees and winners are listed below, winners are in bold.

== Television series ==
=== Best Television Series ===
- **Song of Yanan/延安颂**
- Great Dyehouse/大染坊
- The Greatest Building/天下第一楼

=== Best Mini-series ===
- **Fu Baoshi/傅抱石**
- Country Teacher/乡村女教师
- Great Sun/好太阳
- Liang Shikui/梁世奎
- Lipstic/没有抹完的口红

=== Best Directing in a Television Series ===
- **Yang Yazhou for The Most Romantic Thing**

=== Best Writing in a Television Series ===
- **Wang Chaozhu for Song of Yanan**
- **Hai Yan for Goddess of Mercy**

=== Most Popular Actor ===
- **Liu Jin for Song of Yanan**

=== Most Popular Actress ===
- **Sun Li for Goddess of Mercy**

=== Audience's Choice for Actor ===
- Hou Yong for Great Dyehouse
- Chen Jianbin for Ten Years of Our Marriage
- Tong Dawei for Goddess of Mercy
- Hu Jun for The Eight Creatures
- Liu Jin for Song of Yanan

=== Audience's Choice for Actress ===
- Wang Ji for The Greatest Building
- Chen Hao for Pink Girls
- Sun Li for Goddess of Mercy
- Ni Ping for The Most Romantic Thing
- Xi Meijuan for To be the Banker or Dealer

=== Best Art Direction in a Television Series ===
- **Zhao Guoliang/Lan Ling/He Ming for Kong Yiji**

=== Best Cinematography in a Television Series ===
- **Shen Xinghao/Ye Zhiwei for The Eight Creatures**

=== Best Lighting in a Television Series ===
- **Zhang Xiaojun for Great Dyehouse**

=== Best Sound Recording in a Television Series ===
- **Li Jinjun for The Land**

=== Outstanding Contribution Award ===
- **Tang Guoqiang**

== Literature & Art Program ==
=== Best Literature and Art Program ===
- **2004 CCTV New Year's Gala/中央电视台春节联欢晚会**
- 2004 Shandong TV Spring Festival Gala/2004年山东电视台春节安徽
- 80 Years Anniversary of Dongbei University/辉煌80—庆祝东北大学建校八十周年文艺晚会
- The 4th Golden Eagle Art Festival-TV New Performer Selection第四届中国金鹰电视艺术节电视新秀大赛总决赛晚会
- 2004 Hubei-Xinjia Spring Festival Gala/里舞春风—2004年湖北新疆春节晚会
- Song Zuying-Vienna Concert/宋祖英维也纳金色大厅独唱音乐会
- 与时代和人民同行—江苏省"五个一工程" 颁奖暨优秀作品十年回顾电视文艺晚会
- The Same Song Special Program-Spring Festival Memories/《同一首歌》春节特辑—〈记忆中的歌声〉(二)

=== Best Directing for a Literature and Art Program ===
- **Tian Yuan/Bai Yuqi for 金庸华山论剑**

=== Best Cinematography for a Literature and Art Program ===
- **Cinematography group for 2005 CCTV New Year's Gala**

=== Best Art Direction for a Literature and Art Program ===
- **Chen Yan for 2004 CCTV's New Year Gala**

=== Best Lighting for a Literature and Art Program ===
- **Yang Hansong for Yangzhou International Travel Festival Opening Gala**

== Documentary ==
=== Best Television Documentary ===
- **The Revived Leigon/复活的军团'**
- **Shanxin Businessman/山西**
- Kinggadern/幼儿园
- Ba Jin/百年巴金
- Chen Xiaomin Rush to City/陈小梅进城

=== Best Short Documentary ===
- **Shangri-la's Lu Sha/萨马阁的路沙**
- 22 Hours/惊心动魄22小时
- Rhythm/律动
- Snakes and Birds/蛇.鸟.蛇
- River's Emotion/江河情怀

=== Best Writing and Directing for a Television Documentary ===
- **Jin Mu for The Revived Leigon**

=== Best Cinematography for a Television Documentary ===
- **Liao Tao/Zhao Xinmin for Shangri-la's Lu Sha**

=== Best Sound Recording for a Television Documentary ===
- **He Fang/Zhao Min for 22 Hours**

== Children & Teens Program ==
=== Best Animation ===
- **Nezha/哪吒传奇**
- Martin Morning/马丁的早晨
- Seven and Half Heroes/英雄七个半
