= Love in a Fallen City (novella) =

1943 Chinese novella by Eileen Chang

- Penguin Modern Classics edition
- Author: Eileen Chang 張愛玲
- Language: Chinese
- Genre: Romance
- Published: 1943
- Publication place: China

Love in a Fallen City (傾城之戀) is a 1943 Chinese-language novella by Eileen Chang. The translation is included in the New York Review of Books "Classics" series.

The story focuses on a love story during wartime Hong Kong. Scholar Nicole Huang suggests that Eileen Chang's "most important literary legacy from the 1940s is her construction of an alternative narrative of war, one that contradicted the grand narratives of national salvation and revolution that dominated the wartime literary scene."

== Synopsis ==
The story is set in 1940s Shanghai and Hong Kong. Bai Liusu is a beautiful divorcée who lives in Shanghai. Upon experiencing a failed marriage, Bai Liusu's large extended family feels she has shamed the family through divorce, which results in her situation at home becoming unbearable. The story begins with Bai Liusu receiving news of her ex-husband's death and her refusal to attend his funeral.

Fan Liuyuan is a bachelor who has just returned from England and is working closely in the mining business with Mr. Xu. When Mrs. Xu attempts to introduce Bai Liusu's sister, Bai Baolu, to Fan Liuyuan, he becomes interested in Bai Liusu instead. Fan Liuyuan leaves for Hong Kong for work and Bai Liusu follows him to win his love in hopes of gaining legitimate marriage status and economic stability.

Although everything is going well in Hong Kong, Bai Liusu thinks that she cannot trust Fan Liuyuan. Believing that Fan Liuyuan will not marry her, Bai Liusu decides to return to Shanghai. Upon returning home, her family considers her useless for coming back and bringing shame to the family. Later, Fan Liuyuan calls on her and she decides to return to him. Throughout the story, they undergo many trials and tribulations, while both doubting the other's true commitment and love for each other. However, it is through the fall of Hong Kong that they realize that their love for each other is far more enduring and valuable. The city and their love share an antithetical relationship as their love triumphs while the city is defeated during the Japanese invasion.

== Main characters ==
Bai Liusu

Bai Liusu, a beautiful widow, who lives with her declining aristocratic family in Shanghai. Bai Liusu wants a legitimate marriage status and economic stability from Fan Liuyan, a Chinese bachelor who had just returned from Britain. Bai Liusu is subjected daily to her family members' taunts and insults as she has “no money to maintain a respectful position in the household nor the youth to qualify as a desirable bride on the marriage market”. Bai is also “aware that she occupies the lowest rung on the family hierarchy". Bai's character illustrates the idea of the fetters placed on women of feudal China.

Fan Liuyan

Fan Liuyan is a rich 32-year-old bachelor who is known to be a womanizer and has just returned to China from Britain. Fan feels troubled by his life outside China and lack of an authentic Chinese identity. Fan tries to find his Chinese identity through people around him and from his clan but fails. Thus, Fan's absent Chineseness is translated into wanting a “real Chinese woman” which he believes Bai Liusu embodies. Although Fan seeks for a pure Chinese identity, he has a hybridized identity due to his background.

Princess Saheiyini

Princess Saheiyini arrives in Hong Kong with an Englishman who takes care of her at the beginning of the story. She claims to be the daughter of Prince Krishna Kramupa, but that her mother had lost the prince's favor which resulted in her being exiled with the need to flee from her own country. Saheiyini dresses fancily every time she meets with Bai and Fan. After the war begins, Saheiyini seems to become impoverished, and she says that the Englishman had been imprisoned and ended up living with an Indian policeman's family.

Fourth Mistress

The Fourth Mistress is married to the fourth Master of the Bai Family. Fourth Mistress enjoys gossiping and badmouths Bai Liusu. After Bai Liusu and Fan Liuyan gets married in Hong Kong, Liusu realizes that Fourth Mistress was divorced from the fourth Master in one of her returns to Shanghai.

Fourth Master of the Bai Family

The Fourth Master of the Bai Family enjoys playing the huqin. He does not have power in the Bai household and ends up in a divorce from the Fourth Mistress.

Bai Baolu

Bai Baolu is 24 years old and the seventh young lady of the Bai family. She was originally intended, by Mrs Xu, the matchmaker, to meet Fan Liuyuan. However, during their meeting, the family follows along and Bai Liusu takes the chance to dance with Fan Liuyuan instead. After the dance, Fan chooses Bai Liusu over Bai Baolu.

Mrs. Xu

Mrs. Xu is the matchmaker who introduces men to the Bai family, hoping to make a match for the young ladies in the family. Mrs. Xu's husband, Mr. Xu, does business with Fan Liuyuan. Upon knowing the affection between Bai Liusu and Fan Liuyuan, Mrs Xu helps Bai Liusu to go to Hong Kong to find Fan Liuyan.

== Themes of the novella ==
=== Individualism in crisis ===
One of the dominant theme in Love in a Fallen City is the anxiety of self-identity. Due to the persistence of traditional forces, ethical-moral values, various domestic and international conflicts and wars, a bourgeois self-identity becomes difficult to establish.

=== Matrimonial anxiety ===
Another thematic focus of the story is matrimonial anxiety in the traditional social institution. In the novel, middle-class women such as Bai Liusu and Fourth Mistress aim to grab any opportunity to increase their class status in order to secure their financial security. The anxiety generated by marriage and love is a response to the social-political dilemma. Under this robust womanhood, “in its core, it harbors a profound cultural and historical nihilism.”

== Historical background of the novella ==
At the ending paragraphs of the Love in a Fallen City, Shanghai has come under full-scale Japanese occupation, Hong Kong has lost its brief battle, and China faces its darkest years as a nation under siege.

=== Wartime background ===
Nicole Huang made a comment on Eileen Chang's essays which could be equally applied onto her fictions under wartime background:

"Here, Chang’s vision of wartime life is presented as caught between the territory of historical reality (war, turbulence, blockade, hunger, death, and scarcity) and the domain of imagination (fantasy, emotional yearning, and artistic creativity). The persistence of the singing voice in a night she describes as so “big," so “broken,” and so “cruel" is, of course, Eileen Chang's own reading of an individual's relation to the larger and, at times, overwhelming historical reality. Instead of writing about how routines of life are disrupted by the aggression of war, she chooses to focus on how the experience of urban life is actually intensified despite the fact that the outside world is gradually being shattered."

When the novella was first published in 1943, it was still during the Sino-Japanese war, and both Shanghai and Hong Kong were under the Japanese occupation. The Chinese-controlled parts of Shanghai was first fallen to the Japanese in 1937, and the foreign concessions had also been taken down by the Japanese imperial troops in 1941 with the beginning of the Pacific War. Shanghai had since become one of the two ‘fallen’ cities in Eileen Chang's novella. Before the Japanese invasion, Hong Kong had already been a British colony for more than 100 years. the city was also captured by the Japanese forces after the defeat of the British, Canadian and Indian forces on the Christmas Day as the Governor of Hong Kong Mark Aitchison Young, accompanied by other British colonial officials surrendered at the Japanese headquarters, the local people had referred to the day as “Black Christmas” Hong Kong too, had become the second ‘fallen’ city in the novella.

=== Writing inspiration ===
In her essay, “Reflections on ‘Love in a Fallen City’” (回顧傾城之戀, 1984), Chang relates that during the summer break in her studies at the University of Hong Kong in 1941 she often went to the Repulse Bay Hotel to visit her mother and her mahjong friends. Later, the members of the mahjong group all fled to Singapore and Hanoi. Two, however, stayed in Hong Kong and lived together. Chang claims that Love in a Fallen City is based on the story of this couple who remained in Hong Kong. In her words, “The motive for writing ‘Love in a Fallen City’— at least in relation to their story—I think it was because they were the most affected by the war in Hong Kong among my acquaintances.” According to Chang, then, the “original” idea for the tale came from the real-life experience of a couple she knew. The couple's love story might in fact replicate conventional cultural codes of behavior and fictional or non-fictional historical episodes. Therefore, Love in a Fallen City to some extent can be seen as an adaptation of a true story.

== Literary critics ==
Love in a Fallen City seems to be a melodramatic romance that finally comes to fruition. Typical of the writer's stories about social mannerisms, this novelette is “filled with witty conversations and relentless gossip,” “intricate codes of dress, dining, and socializing,” and “arabesque mannerisms in both private and public domains,” which are “taken as matters of life and death for those leisurely regulars.”

Wang Xiaoping, an associate professor of Chinese and comparative literature in the school of Chinese at Xiamen University, China, indicated that "the predominant thematic focus of Zhang’s stories is a matrimonial anxiety by which middle-class women aim to cash in on any opportunity to unabashedly transcend their class status to secure financial security and a boost in their social status. In its response to the crisis of marriage and love as social institution, this anxiety articulates, crystallizes, and projects the social-political dilemma and predicament of this class. Yet more often than not it produces nothing but utter failure or illusionary success. The feeling that “we have been deserted,” articulated by the writer, echoes this sentiment of a fundamental crisis. Together with the pessimism generated by the social turmoil and human costs of the “war,” a sense of resignation appears, which, while it sometimes impersonates itself as robust womanhood, in its core it harbors a profound cultural and historical nihilism".

Fu Lei (Chinese:傅雷) praised her talent and art but criticized the content of her fiction “taken up by flirtation” and “it’s all a spiritual game of cynical hedonists.” He continues to criticize that despite love and marriage is the author's central theme, the couple in the story is often “pestered by this nightmare of a romantic problem between man and woman” and the flippancy depicted in her somber prose ruins the art of her writing. Chang later wrote a self-defensive essay called “My Own Writing” to articulate her aesthetic principles, cenci de duizhao, which Karen Kingsbury considers it more than just elaborating theme and character, but also operating at the level of narrative style, “in the teasing voice of the narrator, and the frequent shuttling between, for instance, self-mockery and self-indulgence, fantasy and reality, satire and sympathy.”

Liu Zaifu, the Chinese littérateur, ideologist and humanist mentioned in his article that “At first glance, Eileen Chang’s best works, including “The Golden Cangue” and “Love in a Fallen City,” describe the details of family activities, relationships, and marriages that occupy life in places like Shanghai, but they in fact reveal the mysteries in human nature that lie beneath the surface of life, mysteries of human desires for power and money.”

Liang Wendao: "A lot of people tend to ignore the connection between Eileen Chang's work and the Sino Japanese War. But there was a connection. Just like in Love in a fallen city, where she didn't mention how the people in Hong Kong escaped from the gunfire, or what happened between the British and the Japanese forces on the battlefield. What she did mention was how people had lived their daily life under the war, such as life between the two lovers in this novella. It does affect the way we view that war or our society during the war. She had shown us the real life of the most common people. Yes, there was a war; Yes, the Japs had occupied our land. But life still had to go on. You still had to eat and drink. And of course there would be love and even sex. Eileen Chang had shown us during wartime, in such a big city like Shanghai, how the ordinary people had lived through their life. Would there be any story in such a way of life? Yes, but it must have been covered by a touch of sadness or Eileen Chang's most favourite word, desolation.

== Adaptations ==
=== Movies ===
- Love in a Fallen City, a 1984 film starring Cora Miao and Chow Yun-fat; directed by Ann Hui

=== TV series ===
- Love in a Fallen City, a 2009 TV series starring Chen Shu and Huang Jue; produced by the China Television Production Center and released to several channels in the Mainland, Taiwan, and Hong Kong.

=== Stage performances ===
- In 1944, Eileen Chang rewrote it as a script for stage production that was performed successfully in Shanghai, demonstrating its popularity in Shanghai during the wartime period.
- In 1987, 2002, and 2005, the Hong Kong Repertory Theatre (HKRT) adapted the story for stage performances, with elements of singing and ballroom dancing included in the latest version, signaling the prosperity of Hong Kong after the handover.
- In 2006, the HKRT even took the Cantonese performance to Shanghai, Toronto, New York, and Beijing, thus bringing this tale of the Shanghai and Hong Kong of half a century ago not only to several major cities in China, but also to those in North America, showcasing the international status and nourishing cultures of these two cities.

== Notable quotes ==
- "Thinking is painful business."
- "If a woman gets tricked by a man's scheme, then she deserves to die; If a woman makes a scheme to trick a man, then she's a jezebel. If a woman fails to scheme a man and gets herself tricked instead, then she's a jezebel and a villain, even killing her would smudge a blade."
- "Some follies, you not only need to say it behind others, but also behind yourself. Even hearing it by yourself is quite embarrassing. Such as 'I love you', 'I will love you with my entire life'.“
- "If getting married is about maintaining one's basic life, then marriage would be a long term prostitution."
- “You want me to be a good woman in front of others, but a bad woman in front of you. You highest ideal is a pure but provocative woman."
- "If a woman can't get love from her opposite sex, then she wouldn't be able to get respect from her own kind. For this, women are cheap."
- "It's the useless women who are the most formidable."
