= Coolie Killer =

1982 Hong Kong film by Terry Tong

- Film poster
- Traditional Chinese: 殺出西營盤
- Simplified Chinese: 杀出西营盘
- Hanyu Pinyin: Shā Chū Xī Yíng Pán
- Jyutping: Saat3 Ceot1 Sai1 Jing4 Pun4
- Directed by: Terry Tong
- Screenplay by: Eddie Fong; Chun Tin-nam; Chiu Kang-chien
- Produced by: Dennis Yu; Jeffrey Lau
- Starring: Charlie Chin; Elliot Ngok; Lisa Chiao Chiao; Cecilia Yip
- Cinematography: David Chung; Brian Lai
- Edited by: David Wu
- Music by: Ivan Lai; David Wu
- Production companies: Century Motion Picture & Distribution
- Release date: 3 June 1982
- Running time: 91 minutes
- Country: Hong Kong
- Language: Cantonese
- Box office: HK$5,532,180

Coolie Killer is a 1982 Hong Kong action film directed by Terry Tong and starring Charlie Chin, Elliot Ngok, Lisa Chiao Chiao and Cecilia Yip.

== Plot ==
Ko Tat-fu (Charlie Chin), leader of a coolie killer group in Sai Ying Pun who specializes in assassinations in countries, is now the boss of a shipping company in Central, Hong Kong. However, one time, after an ambushed by a group of killers which left four of his underlings dead, he re-assumed his old profession. Ko believes the ambush was related to his refusal of a recent contract to kill someone in Hong Kong. He asks his lover, Hung-kam (Lisa Chiao Chiao) to investigate in to this, but she commits suicide. Ko is determined to battle for the truth. During a rainy night, when Ko takes out his foes, he ends his legendary and romantic life.

== Cast ==
- Charlie Chin as Ko Tat-fu
- Elliot Ngok as Inspector Chung
- Lisa Chiao Chiao as Cheung Hung-kam
- Cecilia Yip as Tong Ho-yee
- Michael Tong as Siu
- Poon Chun-wai as Mak
- Newton Lai as Wor
- Danny Lee as Chung's boss (cameo)
- Kwan Hoi-san as Choi (cameo)
- Lau Siu-ming as Ding
- Chan Shen
- Lau Hok-nin as Man
- Hui Ying-sau as Old doctor
- Alex Ng as gets stuffed in garbage can
- Chan Chik-wai
- Cheung Hei
- Steve Mak
- To wai-wo
- Wong Ha-fei
- Wong Kung-miu
- Chow Kin-ping
- Fung Ming
- Chan Ling-wai
- Tony Tam
- Ng Kit-keung
- Ronnie

== Reception ==
=== Critical ===
Kenneth Brorsson of So Good Reviews gave the film a positive review and writes "Great, more theme – and character based flicks would follow but Coolie Killer offers up a glimpse of why a story of nasty men fighting for own selfish revenge and not silly illusions of love is so pleasurable."

=== Box office ===
The film grossed HK$5,532,180 at the Hong Kong box office during its theatrical run from 3 June to 14 July 1982 in Hong Kong.

== Award nominations ==
- 2nd Hong Kong Film Awards
  - Nominated: Best Film
  - Nominated: Best Cinematography (David Chung, Bryan Lai)
  - Nominated: Best Film Editing (David Wu)
