= Burning Snow =

1988 Hong Kong-Taiwanese film by Patrick Tam

- Film poster
- Traditional Chinese: 雪在燒
- Jyutping: Xue zai shao
- Directed by: Patrick Tam
- Screenplay by: Lai Ming-Tong
- Produced by: Kevin Chu
- Starring: Simon Yam; Chuan-Chen Yeh
- Cinematography: Christopher Doyle
- Edited by: Chow Tak-Yeung
- Music by: Chan Chi-Yuen
- Production companies: Alan & Eric Films Limited; Yen Ping Films Production
- Distributed by: Newport Entertainment Co., Ltd
- Release date: 17 March 1988
- Running time: 86 minutes
- Countries: Hong Kong; Taiwan
- Languages: Cantonese; Mandarin
- Box office: HK $2,393,396

Burning Snow is a 1988 erotic drama film drama directed by Patrick Tam, starring Simon Yam and Chuan-Chen Yeh. A Hong Kong-Taiwanese co-production, the film was selected to be shown in 1988 Toronto International Film Festival and 2007 Far East Film Festival. Chuan-Chen Yeh rose to fame with her performance in this film and become a popular actress in Taiwan.

Alberto Pezzotta, who was a programmer of Venice Film Festival,, had selected Burning Snow as one of his most favorite films.

The film has a Hong Kong version and a Taiwan version, which slightly differ in terms of storyline and sex scenes.

== Cast and roles ==
- Simon Yam – Wah
- Chuan-Chen Yeh – Cher
- Chih-Cheng Hsueh – Chung
