= The Spooky Bunch =

1980 Hong Kong film by Ann Hui

- Taiwan version theatrical poster
- Traditional Chinese: 撞到正
- Jyutping: zong6 dou3 zing3
- Directed by: Ann Hui
- Produced by: Josephine Siao
- Starring: Josephine Siao; Kenny Bee
- Production company: Hi-Pitch Co. Ltd.
- Release date: 22 May 1980
- Running time: 97 minutes
- Country: Hong Kong
- Language: Cantonese

The Spooky Bunch (撞到正; known as 小姐撞到鬼 in Taiwan) is a 1980 Hong Kong movie directed by Ann Hui. It is Hui's second film, after The Secret.

== Plot ==
The film is about a Cantonese opera troupe arrives on Cheung Chau Island to perform a show under the request by a wealthy man, Mr Ma who insists that and Ah Chi (Josephine Siao), their second rate supporting actress, takes the leading role in the performance. Mr Ma also invites his nephew Dick Ma (Kenny Bee) to the island to watch the show. He hopes by arranging this his nephew will marry Ah Chi so that his family curse being done by Ah Chi's her grandfather placed on this grandfather can be released.

== Cast ==
- Josephine Siao - Ah Gee
- Kenny Bee - Dick
- Cheung Kam
- Kwan Chung
- Lau Hark-Sun - (credited as Kexuan Liu)
- Tina Lau
- Zheng Mengxia - (credited as Mang-ha Cheung)

== Background and reception ==
A reviewer for Asian Movie Pulse said that The Spooky Bunch was a modernised rework of two genres that had been declining in popularity with Hong Kong audiences at the time of its release: the ghost story, and the Cantonese opera.

== Restoration and re-screening ==
A 4K resolution restoration of the film premiered in Hong Kong on 25 April 2026 at the Hong Kong Cultural Centre. This screening was part of the "Fantasies in Reality: A Cinematic Journey" retrospective showcasing the various worlds presented by Hong Kong filmmakers over the years.
