= Evil Cat =

1987 Hong Kong film by Dennis Yu

- DVD cover
- Traditional Chinese: 凶貓
- Simplified Chinese: 凶猫
- Directed by: Dennis Yu
- Written by: Wong Jing
- Produced by: Dennis Yu
- Starring: Lau Kar-leung; Tang Lai Ying; Mark Cheng
- Cinematography: Arthur Wong
- Edited by: Wong Ming-Lam
- Music by: Law Wing-Fai
- Distributed by: Mei Ah Film Production Co. Ltd.
- Release date: 1 January 1987
- Running time: 91 minutes
- Country: Hong Kong
- Language: Cantonese

Evil Cat (凶貓) is a 1987 Hong Kong horror film directed by Dennis Yu.

== Plot ==
The Cheung Family has been feuding with the Evil Cat for eight generations. This time, the Evil Cat reincarnates and possesses a tycoon's body. Several fights start in order to eliminate the Evil Cat. One day, at Tina's home (where the Cat lives), Cheung shoots Tina at the shoulder but Inspector Wu comes to her rescue just before Cheung can kill the Cat. Pulling out the charmed arrow in Tina's shoulder, the Cat recovers its power.

== Cast ==
- Lau Kar-leung
- Tang Lai Ying
- Mark Cheng
