= Carry On Pickpocket =

1982 Hong Kong film by Sammo Hung

- Film poster
- Traditional Chinese: 提防小手
- Simplified Chinese: 提防小手
- Hanyu Pinyin: Tǐ Fáng Xiǎo Shóu
- Jyutping: Tai4 Fong4 Siu2 Sau2
- Directed by: Sammo Hung
- Written by: Barry Wong
- Produced by: Frankie Chan; Guy Lai
- Starring: Sammo Hung; Frankie Chan; Deanie Ip; Richard Ng; Natalis Chan; Didi Pang; Lau Hak-suen; Peter Chan Lung
- Cinematography: Ricky Lau
- Edited by: Peter Cheung; Keung Chuen-tak
- Music by: Frankie Chan; Philip Chan
- Production company: Always Good Films
- Release date: 31 March 1982
- Running time: 102 minutes
- Country: Hong Kong
- Language: Cantonese
- Box office: HK$11,809,432

Carry On Pickpocket (Chinese: 提防小手, released in the Philippines as Mad Fighter) is a 1982 Hong Kong action comedy film directed by Sammo Hung, who also stars in it, alongside Frankie Chan, Deanie Ip and Richard Ng. Hung, along with his stunt team, the Sammo Hung Stuntmen's Association, Yuen Biao, Lam Ching-ying and Billy Chan served as action directors. For his performance in the film, Hung received the Best Actor award at the 2nd Hong Kong Film Awards and shared it with Karl Maka for Aces Go Places.

== Plot ==
Hung Tai-kong aka "Rice Pot" (Sammo Hung) and Chan Yin-tung aka "Chimney" (Frankie Chan) are two friends who work with their master Kam Ming (Lau Hak-suen) and his daughter Ann (Didi Pang) as a team of pickpockets. Rice Pot, Chimney and Ann later meet Inspector Ling Ah-nam (Deanie Ip), who is investigating a diamond robbery and later becomes Rice Pot's girlfriend. She tells Rice Pot that she has to leave for 2 to 3 months. He finds out that she lied to him, and later she explains to him and reveals that she is on an undercover mission. Ling asks the three of them to help her snatch a box of diamonds from Chow Ming-shing (Peter Chan Lung).

Later, troubled cop Ng Heung-kan (Richard Ng) runs into Rice Pot and Chimney. Finding out that they are pickpockets, Ng becomes desperate to arrest them.

After successfully getting the diamonds, Ling has them pretend to give Chow the diamonds in order to arrest Chow. However, the diamonds that Ling gives them are fake and the three of them become suspicious of Ling. Later, a big fight takes place on Chow's ship and a final fight with Rice Pot against one of Shing's henchmen (Dick Wei). Finally Rice Pot and Chimney kills Shing and his elite henchman.

Ling attempts to flee from Hong Kong with the real diamonds and the three of them find her in the airport. Rice Pot manages to snatch the diamonds from her, only to run into Ng, who is patrolling there and causes him to drop them.

In the end, there is an epilogue written in text for each character. Rice Pot, Chimney and Ann are charged with theft and murder. They are sentenced to 7, 5 and 3 years to prison respectively. Kam is charged with theft and receiving stolen goods and sentenced to 2 years. Ling is charged with impersonating a cop and cheating, and is sentenced to 10 years. Sergeant Ng is promoted to police inspector for discovering an international criminal group.

== Cast ==
Cast	Role
Sammo Hung	Hung Tai-kong / Rice Pot
Frankie Chan	Chan Yin-tung / Chimney
Deanie Ip	Ling Ah-nam
Richard Ng	Sergeant Ng Heung-kan
Natalis Chan	Man who asks to dance with Ling (cameo)
Pang Sau-Ha	Ann Kam
Lau Hak-suen	Kam Ming / Teacher
Peter Chan Lung	Chow Ming-shing
Dick Wei	One of Chow's henchmen
Lau Chau-sang	One of Chow's henchmen
Cho Tat-wah	Glasses Cop
James Tien	Ng's superior
Wu Ma	Man taking photo at airport (cameo)
Yuen Biao	Man at bank (cameo)
Billy Chan	Disco Thug
Johnny Cheung	Thug

== Release ==
Carry On Pickpocket was released in Hong Kong on 31 March 1982. In the Philippines, the film was released as Mad Fighter by Action Films on August 30, 1988, graded "C" by the Movie and Television Review and Classification Board which indicates a "fair" quality. Philippine posters miscredit Jackie Chan as its producer and director.

== Award ==
Award
Ceremony	Category	Recipient	Outcome
2nd Hong Kong Film Awards	Best Actor	Sammo Hung	Won
