= The Sword (1980 film) =

1980 Hong Kong film by Patrick Tam

- Film poster
- 名劍
- Directed by: Patrick Tam
- Screenplay by: Lau Shing-hon; Clifford Choi; Wong Ying; Patrick Tam; Lo Chi-keung; Lau Tin-chi
- Story by: Wong Ying
- Produced by: Raymond Chow
- Starring: Adam Cheng; Norman Chui; JoJo Chan; Tien Feng; Chui Kit; Bonnie Ngai; Eddy Ko; Lee Hoi-sang
- Cinematography: Bill Wong
- Edited by: Peter Cheung
- Music by: Joseph Koo
- Production company: Golden Harvest
- Distributed by: Golden Harvest
- Release date: 14 August 1980
- Running time: 86 minutes
- Country: Hong Kong
- Language: Cantonese
- Box office: HK$2,646,769

The Sword (名劍) is a 1980 Hong Kong wuxia film co-written and directed by Patrick Tam, starring Adam Cheng, Norman Chui, JoJo Chan, Tien Feng, Chui Kit, Bonnie Ngai, Eddy Ko, and Lee Hoi-sang.

== Synopsis ==
The legendary swordsman Hua Qianshu finds the Qiwu Sword and takes it to the blacksmith Wang Shiqi and asks him to repair it. Wang tells Hua that the sword is a bad omen as it was forged in hatred, telling Hua to either discard it or die by it if he chooses to use it. Hua decides not to use the sword and passes it to his friend Xuanji for safekeeping before retiring.

Li Moran is a swordsman who admires Hua and has been seeking to challenge the legendary swordsman to a duel. On his quest, Li meets Yingzhi and helps her fend off a pursuer. They travel together and stop by an inn, where Li meets Yan Xiaoyu, whom he used to have romantic feelings for. Yan tells Li that she is married to Lian Huan in an arranged marriage. Lian's bodyguard Chen Tieyi attacks Li and they fight until Lian shows up. Lian, feeling jealous of Li, orders Chen to kill Li. Later that night, Chen attacks Li and injures him, but Li manages to escape.

Li is found and rescued by Xuanji, who has received news that Hua's daughter has been kidnapped. Li agrees to save Hua's daughter to repay Xuanji's kindness; she then gives him the Qiwu Sword. It is then revealed that Yingzhi is Hua's daughter. Li saves Yingzhi and returns her safely to her father. After that, Li challenges Hua to a duel, which Hua accepts. However, Yingzhi feels unhappy as she thinks that Li used her to get to her father. Three days later, Li and Hua duel, and Hua admits defeat after being slightly wounded. Yet, Li feels dissatisfied as he thinks Hua is not using his full strength. Later, he learns from Xuanji that Hua has been ill for some time.

Meanwhile, Chen sneaks into Hua's home, kills him, and steals his Hanxing Sword. Yingzhi, thinking that Li killed her father, swears vengeance. Xuanji feels guilty for Hua's death as she gave the Qiwu Sword to Li, so she commits suicide. Just as Li is trying to explain his innocence to Yingzhi, Chen shows up and attacks him, but Li kills Chen with the Qiwu Sword. Before dying, Chen reveals that Lian is responsible for Hua's death.

Li and Yingzhi confront Lian, who admits that he killed Hua to get the Hanxing Sword, and now he is going to kill Li to get the Qiwu Sword as well. Although Li manages to kill Lian after an intense duel, he finds Yan dead and breaks down in tears while Yingzhi walks away silently. In the final scene, Li takes the Qiwu Sword to a cliff overlooking the sea and throws it into the waves.

== Cast ==
- Adam Cheng as Li Moran
- Norman Chui as Lian Huan
- JoJo Chan as Yan Xiaoyu
- Tien Feng as Hua Qianshu
- Chui Kit as Hua Yingzhi
- Bonnie Ngai as Xuanji
- Eddy Ko as Chen Tieyi
- Lee Hoi-sang as Qiu Huan
- Ng Tung as Wang Shiqi
- Lau Siu-ming as the nameless swordsman
- Lau Yat-fan as the pigeon old man

== Production ==
Raymond Chow was credited for the producer for most of the 1970s films by Golden Harvest, which is internationally known for making martial arts films starring Bruce Lee such as The Big Boss (1971) and Enter the Dragon (1973). After Golden Harvest attempted to create similar films such as Hapkido (1972), academic Leung Wing-Fat commented that the studio's style was too "formulaic and repetitive". When actors such as Jackie Chan became successful in the late 1970s, Golden Harvest began looking for new talents to compete with them.

Among the new talents was director Patrick Tam. Like many directors of the Hong Kong New Wave films, Tam began in television. He started out in the Hong Kong television station TVB as a prop assistant in 1967. By 1975, he was directing programmes such as Superstar Special. His last major television production was 13 (1977), and The Sword was his first feature film.

The story for The Sword was originally by wuxia novelist Wong Ying. Tam said that Golden Harvest requested for a wuxia film, which was what Adam Cheng was known for acting in at the time. Both Cheng and Norman Chui were popular television actors in Hong Kong at the time. Tam specifically spoke of King Hu's films, saying that he found them to be the only wuxia films that tried to "break new ground" for the genre, and attempted to do this with The Sword. Tam told Hong Kong magazine Film Biweekly in 1980 that "On the surface, The Sword is a wuxia film, but in essence it isn't," noting that the protagonist remains passive throughout most of the film except when he tosses the sword away at the end." Tam continued that he edited the film to in a deliberate attempt to "deconstruct the hero image as well as the orthodox treatment of period drama."

Tam organised the action scenes in the film to have less of the "strike followed by strike" style of action choreography, and banned the use of zoom shots that were common in wuxia films at the time. Tang said in a 1980 interview in City Entertainment Film Biweekly that he wanted to create ambience and atmosphere for the film. This included banning zoom shots in The Sword. Tam also had the action choreographers study the script to get information about the characters to develop unique action choreography for them, opposed to developing the choreography on the day of shooting.

== Release ==
The Sword was released on August 14, 1980. It grossed a total of HK$2,646,769. Film journalist John Charles wrote in The Hong Kong Filmography (2000) that The Sword had little distribution in the west, which resulted it in being little known among western fans of Hong Kong films.

The film was released on blu-ray by Eureka Entertainment on December 3, 2024.

== Reception ==
Hong Kong film magazine City Entertainment Film Biweekly praised the film's cinematography, saying that the fight scenes focused on dynamic beauty and rhythm over fighting, and that the film was a unique take on martial arts films of the period. A later review of the magazine commented on the film's editing that the reviewer felt gave the film fresh techniques and that the film's focus was not on its narrative but to create a new form of film language not influenced by Hollywood film techniques.

John Charles in his book The Hong Kong Filmography, 1977-1997 (2000) described The Sword as an "excellent swordplay drama" describing it as "shot and edited with a invigorating sense of style and composition" with super action choreography from Ching Siu-tung. In an interview, Tam said he "could have made a better movie [...] I am not satisfied with it."
