= The Second Woman (2012 film) =

2012 Chinese-Hong Kong film by Carol Lai

- China poster
- Directed by: Carol Lai
- Screenplay by: Carol Lai; Lai Ho
- Produced by: Gordon Chan
- Starring: Shu Qi; Shawn Yue; Chen Shu; Zhang Nai Tian; Niu Meng Meng
- Edited by: Kwong Chi-leung
- Music by: Raymond Wong
- Release dates: 8 March 2012 (China); 22 March 2012 (Hong Kong)
- Running time: 98 minutes
- Countries: China; Hong Kong
- Language: Chinese

The Second Woman (Chinese: 情谜; pinyin: Qing mi) is a 2012 film directed by Carol Lai. The film is a Chinese-Hong Kong co-production.

== Plot ==
Twin sisters Bao and Xiang are identical, even to a fault where their mother and Bao's lover, Nan, could not tell them apart. When Bao becomes sick after the pressure of being on stage, Xiang decides to replace her for the time being since no one else in the troupe knows about her besides Nan. After hearing that Xiang performed better than her, Bao and Nan's relationship starts to deteriorate as she suspects that her twin sister and her lover might be carrying an affair behind her back. Bao takes Xiang to their favorite hill by the cliff to have a conversation and the scene shifts to Xiang alone in a canoe in the middle of the ocean. She grabs the oar and attacks a hand that grabbed her and leaves. One of the villager fisherman, Uncle Tai, witnesses Xiang running to the dock in the rain.

The family was made aware that Xiang left to travel for work and wants to report the sudden disappearance instead. But Bao (whom the viewers is led to believe is Huixiang in disguise) hesitates on the idea. Nan, though convinced that Xiang does often disappear without leaving a message, is extremely suspicious of Bao's lighthearted attitude about the whole situation. He goes to his friend, KK, to look into Xiang's disappearance and KK reaches out to his sister, Fan, to help him. Uncle Tai finds a floating jacket at the shore and reports it to the police; KK and Fan is convinced that Xiang drowned Bao at sea to take her place based on this evidence. In the meantime, Bao starts to see manifestations of her sister and is stuck between a psychotic state and a sober state as she tries to improve her acting along with Nan and the aggressive female lead, Amy. During one rehearsal, Amy is injured but Nan believes Bao caused the accident on purpose so that she could rise as the female lead.

After going with Fan to the cliff, Nan finds Bao's floral hair pin and confronts her in the dressing room. Bao recalls the story of taking Xiang to the hill by the cliff to ask about her relationship with Nan. Xiang avoids the subject. The two take cover in a makeshift shelter from the thunderous rain where Bao drops her hair pin. Later at the beach, while reminiscing about their childhood stealing canoes, she suggests the two steal a canoe and go out to the water. When KK temporarily leaves the investigation to Fan, Fan travels to the haunted house which the twins and Nan often frequent and is captured. As KK comes to her rescue, Fan persuades him that Xiang was the one who tied her up and mentioned something about Bao finally being the female lead. Fan recalls the story as Xiang tells the rest of the story to her- that Bao continued to pressure Xiang for an answer on the canoe. Xiang gives a shallow answer by accusing her sister of being a bad performer and a bad girlfriend and then pushes her into the water. Bao resurfaces and asks Xiang to save her, like when they were kids. When Bao blames her for purposely knocking her off the canoe, an enraged Xiang attacks her with the oar. Thinking she has killed Bao, Xiang leans over to inspect the water. Xiang was then pulled under by Bao causing the canoe to flip over; Bao triumphs over Xiang and leaves her to unconscious while heading for the shore. Once she reaches the shore, she heads to Xiang's home and takes her clothes. Once she changed into Xiang's clothes, she runs back to the pier to find Xiang's body. Xiang in the meantime, regained consciousness and waited until Bao reached the shore before she came out of the water too. KK and Fan reaches the conclusion that all this time, it was actually Bao, not Xiang disguised as her, who wanted to succeed in the troupe's live performance.

During intermission, Bao was locked in her dressing room and forced to watch the performance executed by Xiang with Nan. The performance, similar to Bao's and Xiang's realistic situation, allows Bao to enter the stage with ease and play a part of her original character to synchronize with Nan and Xiang while she challenges her twin to see who Nan prefers. In shock, Nan, similar to the actual play, also could not choose between the two of them. Bao tells Xiang she hates her and wishes she had stayed away. Accepting this, Xiang finally stabs herself to death with Nan crying over her body and Bao mourning at a distance as the crowd gives a roaring applause.

The film ends with Mrs Hui sitting outside her home waiting for Xiang to come home.

== Cast ==
- Shu Qi as Huibao and Huixiang
- Shawn Yue as Nan
- Chen Shu as Amy
- Zhang Nai Tian as KK
- Niu Meng Meng as Fan
