= Once Upon a Mirage =

1982 Hong Kong film by Patrick Lung Kong

- 細圈仔
- Directed by: Patrick Lung Kong
- Screenplay by: Lillian Lee Pik-Wah
- Produced by: Leung Lap-Yan
- Cinematography: Lee Tat-Hung
- Edited by: Fan Kung-Ming
- Music by: Frankie Chan Fan-Kei
- Release date: 25 August 1982 (Hong Kong)
- Running time: 101 min
- Country: Hong Kong
- Language: Cantonese
- Box office: HK$ 3,36 million

Once Upon a Mirage (細圈仔) is a 1982 Hong Kong film directed by Patrick Lung Kong.

== Cast ==
- Wong Yee-Ching - Li Chu Chu
- Cheung Ga-Wai - Sharky
- Lau Shing-Yip - Li Hsiang Yang
- Roy Chiao - Policeman Ma
- Liu Wai-hung - Lu Yik Nien
- Tien Lie - Catty Li
- Patrick Lung Kong
- David Lo Dai-Wai - Master Lung's dad
- Choi Gwok-Hing - Uncivil man in toilet
- Chris Lee Kin-Sang - Li Kang
- Dorothy Yu Yee-Ha - Chang Ai Hsia
- Hui Kin-Seun
- Yeung Yau-Cheung - Massage customer

== Awards ==
Lillian Lee Pik-Wah was nominated for Best Screenplay for at Once Upon a Mirage the 2nd Hong Kong Film Awards.
