= Ann Hui =

Hong Kong film director (born 1947)

Ann Hui BBS MBE
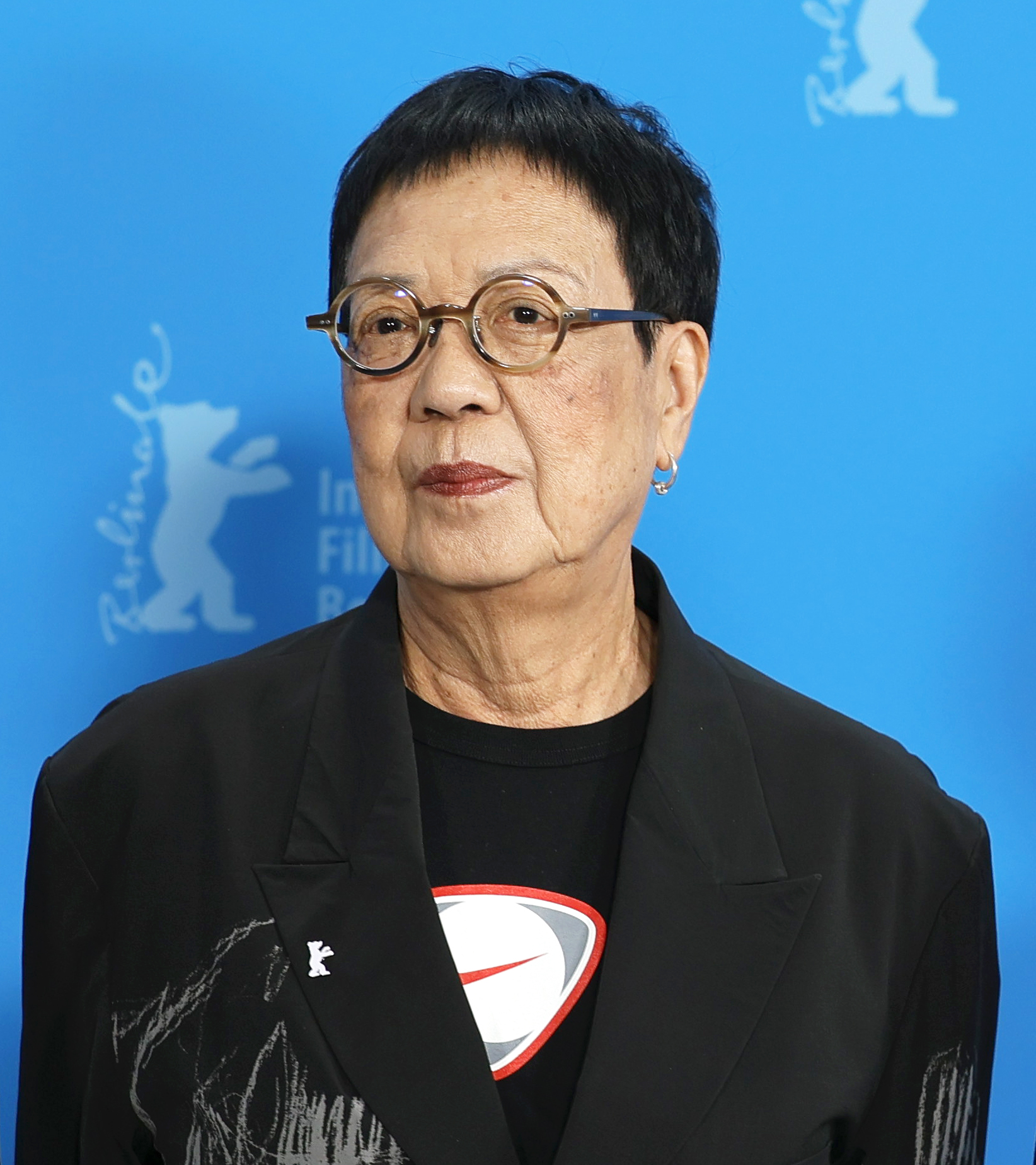
- Hui at the 2024 Berlinale
- Born: Hui On-wah; 23 May 1947 (age 79); Anshan, Liaoning, Republic of China
- Education: London Film School
- Occupations: Film director; producer; screenwriter; actress
- Years active: 1979–present

Chinese name
- Traditional Chinese: 許鞍華
- Simplified Chinese: 许鞍华
Transcriptions
Standard Mandarin
- Hanyu Pinyin: Xǔ Ānhuá
Yue: Cantonese
- Jyutping: heoi2 on1 waa4

Japanese name
- Kanji: 許 鞍華
Transcriptions
- Romanization: Kyo Anka

Ann Hui On-wah BBS MBE (Chinese: 許鞍華; born 23 May 1947) is a Hong Kong filmmaker and actress. One of the most critically acclaimed filmmakers of the Hong Kong New Wave, she is known for her films about social issues in Hong Kong which include literary adaptations, martial arts, semi-autobiographical works, women's issues, social phenomena, political changes, and thrillers. She served as the president of the Hong Kong Film Directors' Guild from 2004 to 2006.

Hui has won numerous awards. She won Best Director at the Golden Horse Awards three times (1999, 2011, 2014); Best Film at the Asia Pacific Film Festival; and Best Director at the Hong Kong Film Awards six times (1983, 1996, 2009, 2012, 2015, 2018).

Only two films have won a Grand Slam (Best Picture, Best Director, Best Screenplay, Best Actor, and Best Actress) at the Hong Kong Film Awards; they are Summer Snow and A Simple Life, both directed by Ann Hui. She was honored for her lifetime accomplishments at the 2012 Asian Film Awards. In 2017, the US based Academy of Motion Picture Arts and Sciences invited Hui to become a member.

== Early life ==
Hui was born on 23 May 1947 in Anshan, a Chinese iron-mining city in Liaoning Province. Hui's mother was Japanese and her father was Chinese. In 1952, Hui moved to Macau, then to Hong Kong at the age of five. Hui attended St. Paul's Convent School. She grew up in an old-fashioned Chinese family. Since her grandfather and father both loved classical literature, Hui learned to recite many ancient Chinese poems. When she was in college, Hui worked in the student theater troupe performing as an extra, doing busywork and designing posters. When she had troubles she couldn't resolve, she would go to the cinema to watch a movie.

== Education ==
In 1972, Hui earned a master's in English and comparative literature from the University of Hong Kong. Hui studied at the London Film School for two years. Hui wrote her thesis on the works of Alain Robbe-Grillet, a French writer and filmmaker.

== Career ==
When Hui returned to Hong Kong after her stay in London, she became an assistant to prominent Chinese film director King Hu. She then began working for Television Broadcasts Limited (TVB) as a scriptwriter-director and produced documentaries such as Wonderful, four episodes of CID, two of Social Worker, and one of the Dragon, Tiger, Panther series. In March 1977 she directed six dramas for the Independent Commission Against Corruption, a Hong Kong organization created to clean up government misconduct. Two of these films were so controversial that they were banned. A year later, Hui directed three episodes of Below the Lion Rock, a documentary series about people from Hong Kong, produced by public broadcasting station, Radio Television Hong Kong. The most recognized episode of Hui's is Boy from Vietnam (1978), which is the start of her Vietnam Trilogy.

In 1979, Hui finally directed her first feature-length film, The Secret, which presents images from the gloomy and dreary old Western District, with its worn-out mansions, shadowy alleys, fallen leaves and religious rituals, such as the ceremonial rite of releasing the soul from purgatory by burning paper money and cutting off the head of a chicken. The Secret earned Hui a Golden Horse Award for Best Feature Film.

In the 1980s, Hui's career was growing internationally. The most popular films of that time were Eastern variations of Hollywood gangster and action films. But Hui did not follow the trend, and instead created more personal films. Many of her best films dealt with cultural displacement. In particular, her central characters are often forced to relocate to another country where they struggle to learn and survive. Hui explores the characters' reactions to new environments and their responses to their return home. During this "New Wave" period, most of her films are sharp and tough, with satirical and political metaphors, reflecting her concern for people; for women; for orphans devastated by war; and for Vietnamese refugees. Her best known works in this category are The Story of Woo Viet (1981) and Boat People (1982) – the remaining two parts of her Vietnam Trilogy. Boat People won the Hong Kong Film Awards for Best Film and Best Director. Although Hui has directed some generic films, another common theme she works with is family conflict, such as in the 1990 film My American Grandson.

Hui's concern for regular people, and especially women, became the most common theme in her films. She creates stories of the experiences of women. One of her most personal works is Song of the Exile (1990), a semi-autobiographical film about family connections and identity. It depicts the story of a young woman, Cheung Hueyin, returning to Hong Kong for her sister's wedding after studying film in London for several years. Hueyin and her mother, who is Japanese, do not seem to have a steady relationship. As the film follows Hueyin's journey to her mother's home town in Japan, Hueyin and her mother are forced to re-examine their relationship, as both have been uprooted from their own countries. "Its narratives of migration also spoke to the displacement of the Hong Kong people as they left the colony in panic to escape the impending Chinese rule." The film won both the Hong Kong Film Awards and Golden Horse Award for Best Director. She served as the president of the Hong Kong Film Directors' Guild in 2004.

In the 1990s, Hui worked on more commercial films. She directed fewer films herself, as she focused on behind-the-scenes work for other filmmakers. The theme of displacement still recurs in her work. During the mid-1990s, Hui started a film project about the Tiananmen Square massacre and the reactions of Hong Kong citizens, but the project was not completed due to lack of funding. Throughout her career, Hui has taken chances to develop more intense and ambitious films while making a name for herself.

Hui said in an interview that she wanted to do more socially conscious projects. She knew the difficulties of finding projects that would do that and "attract investors as well as appeal to the public." Her goal was to "present something that is watchable and at the same time attractive" and allow the public to analyse the social issues involved. Hui is known for making controversial films; the interview, in particular, described the horrors of increased crime and unemployment rates in Tin Shui Wai, Hong Kong. Two of her films that focus on these issues are The Way We Are (2008) and Night and Fog (2009), while maintaining a motif of displacement.

The 45th annual Hong Kong International Film Festival was held in April 2021. Hui was one of the six veteran Hong Kong filmmakers who directed Johnnie To Kei-Fung's highly anticipated anthology film: Septet: The Story of Hong Kong (2020). The other filmmakers were Sammo Hung, Ringo Lam, Patrick Tam Kar-Ming, Tsui Hark, Yuen Woo-ping and Johnnie To. The short films were shot entirely on 35 mm film; each touches on a nostalgic and moving story set across different time periods, with each an ode to the city.

=== Vietnam trilogy ===
"Collectively, the three have been named the 'Trilogy of Vietnam', as they all focus on problems involving Vietnam. They are about the tragic destinies of displaced individuals seeking a place to which they can belong and who are struggling in a period of changes, leading in the end to failure."

Boy from Vietnam (1978) is the first film of Hui's Vietnam Trilogy. It chronicles a teenager's illegal entry to Hong Kong and adjustment to life in the city. "As the boy locates his brother, who is already in Hong Kong, moves from a safe house and takes up work, Hui and writers Shu Kei and Wong Chi carefully shed light on the hardships immigrants face in Hong Kong. The new home, it turns out, is no promised land for refugees but more a transit point on a journey elsewhere, and a place where injustice and prejudice are common." This film is historical: in the late 1970s, a large number of Vietnamese boat people illegally immigrated to Hong Kong. This film describes the experience of those who risked their lives in Hong Kong, and shows the setbacks, discrimination and exploitation they experienced when they were only teens.

In 1981, The Story of Woo Viet continued to examine the problem of Vietnamese boat people. Woo Viet, an overseas Chinese from Vietnam, smuggles himself into Hong Kong after trying many times. He gets a pen pal from Hong Kong to help him start over in the United States. However, he is stuck in the Philippines as a hired killer for saving his love. This film describes the hardship of smuggling, the memories of war, the sinister nature of refugee camps, and the crisis in Chinatown.

In 1982, the People's Republic of China, having just ended a war with Vietnam, permitted Hui to film on Hainan Island. Boat People (1982) set in 1978, after the Communist Party began its rule over Vietnam, through the point of view of a Japanese photojournalist, Shiomi Akutagawa, showed the condition of society and political chaos after the Vietnam War. Boat People was the first Hong Kong movie filmed in Communist China. Hui saved a role for Chow Yun-fat, but because at that time Hong Kong actors working in mainland China were banned in Taiwan, Chow Yun-fat declined the role out of fear of being blacklisted. Six months before filming was set to start, and after the film crew was already on location in Hainan, a cameraman suggested that Hui give the role to Andy Lau. At that time, Lau was still a newcomer in the Hong Kong film industry. Hui gave Lau the role and flew him to Hainan before a proper audition or even seeing what he looked like.

=== Transition from television to film ===
Hui left television in 1979, making her first feature, The Secret, a mystery thriller based on a real-life murder case and starring Taiwanese star Sylvia Chang. It was immediately hailed as an important film in the Hong Kong New Wave. The Spooky Bunch (1981) was her take on the ghost story genre, while The Story of Woo Viet (1981) continued her Vietnam Trilogy. Hui experimented with special effects and daring angles; her preoccupation with sensitive political and social issues is a recurrent feature in most of her subsequent films. Boat People (1982), the third part of her Vietnam Trilogy, is the most famous of her early films. It examines the plight of the Vietnamese after the Vietnam War.

In the mid-1980s Hui continued her string of critically acclaimed works. Love in a Fallen City (1984) was based on a novella by Eileen Chang, and the two-part, ambitious wuxia adaptation of Louis Cha's first novel, The Book and the Sword, was divided into The Romance of Book and Sword (1987) and Princess Fragrance (1987). In 1990, one of her most important works to date, the semi-autobiographical The Song of Exile, was released. The film looks into the loss of identity, disorientation and despair faced by an exiled mother and a daughter faced with clashes in culture and historicity. As in the film, Hui's mother was Japanese.

=== Post-hiatus work ===
After a brief hiatus in which she returned briefly to television, Hui returned with Summer Snow (1995), about a middle-aged woman trying to cope with everyday family problems and an Alzheimer's-inflicted father-in-law. In 1996, she was a member of the jury at the 46th Berlin International Film Festival.

Eighteen Springs (1997) reprises another Eileen Chang novel. Hui's Ordinary Heroes (1999), about Chinese and Hong Kong political activists from 1970s to the 1990s, won the Best Feature at the Golden Horse Awards.

In 2002, her July Rhapsody, the companion film to Summer Snow about a middle-aged male teacher facing a mid-life crisis, was released to good reviews in Hong Kong and elsewhere. Her film, Jade Goddess of Mercy (2003), starring Zhao Wei and Nicholas Tse, was adapted from a novel from Chinese writer Hai Yan.

In 2008, Hui directed the highly acclaimed domestic drama, The Way We Are. In an interview with Esther M. K. Cheung, Hui recalls working on The Way We Are being the same as working during her "earlier TVB days".

The film has no plot yet people did not find that distracting. I am also very proud of the film's relative technical merits. I was doing completely the same thing as before. People watch the film without knowing why its believable and why it's not boring.

The Way We Are was followed by Night and Fog. "The two films revolve around the mundane lives of the inhabitants of Tin Shui Wai's public housing blocks." In an interview with Muse magazine, Hui explains how she sees the two films as about something uniquely Hong Kong: "[on Night and Fog] I think that this film can represent something; it can express a kind of feeling about the middle and lower class, and maybe even Hong Kong as a whole. Everyone can eat at McDonald's or shop at malls. That's a way of life, but spiritually, there's dissatisfaction, especially with families on welfare. They don't really have any worries about life, but there's an unspeakable feeling of depression.

A Simple Life (2011) premiered at the 68th Venice International Film Festival where it was nominated for the Golden Lion. The film centres on the relationship of two characters, Ah Tao (Deanie Ip) and Roger (Andy Lau). It is a tale about a master and his long-time servant and was based on the relationship producer Roger Lee had with his servant. The film was chosen as Hong Kong's submission to the Academy Awards but did not make the shortlist. Hui could not afford to film A Simple Life until she found Andy Lau. "You make a movie and a lot of people ask you why you do it, and this time I was moved by one person's behavior, by the script." "Because she has always shot a very authentic Hong Kong theme, the reaction on the mainland will not be too special", said Andy Lau. When Hui reached him, she said something that made him sad: "I haven't had enough money for a long time. Can you help me?" Andy Lau said it touched him. "I feel so sad. Sometimes when you make a movie, they say, aren't you afraid to lose money? It's not the best-selling, it's not the most famous, but sometimes you're moved, maybe it's the action, maybe it's the script, and the many little drops add together to make me do it. I work hard to make money every day, so I won't be stupid". He invested 30 million yuan before Yu Dong (president of Bona Film Group Limited) joined. "Both the director and I wanted the film to come out, so we calculated the cost and used it to produce, what I lost was just my salary, just count it as finding someone to play with me for two months."

Hui's 2014 film The Golden Era premiered out of competition at the 71st Venice International Film Festival. It was a biopic based on the lives of writers Xiao Hong and Xiao Jun. Tang Wei and Feng Shaofeng starred.

Our Time Will Come (Chinese: 明月幾時有) is a 2017 war film, starring Zhou Xun, Eddie Peng and Wallace Huo. It revolves around the resistance movement during Japan's occupation of Hong Kong. Mark Jenkins writes, "Fictionalized from actual events, the sumptuously photographed drama centers on Lan (Zhou Xun), a teacher before the Japanese closed the local schools. After she helps smuggle out a noted author (Guo Tao), the young woman is recruited by the insurgents' swashbuckling leader (Eddie Peng). Lan eventually learns that her ex (Wallace Huo Chienhwa) has infiltrated the occupation headquarters, where he discusses classical Chinese verse with a Japanese officer (Masatoshi Nagase, who also portrayed another poetry lover in 'Paterson')." The film opened in China on 1 July 2017, to commemorate and to coincide with the 20th anniversary of the handover of Hong Kong from the United Kingdom to China.

In 2022, Hui was invited to be the Jury President of the 59th Golden Horse Awards.

In February 2024, Hui served as a jury member at the 74th Berlin International Film Festival.

== Style, themes and legacy ==
Hui starts with the female perspective, depicting the hearts of women. Most of her films show daily life of women in Hong Kong and create vivid female images through delicate artistic expression. In her movies, women are independent individuals with their own personality. Her films are always full of a sense of drama, but they do not make the audience feel hopeless. They all have an atmosphere of grief, but without pessimism. In her films, there is no terrible conflict, but she uses a plain method to represent the female world. In her movies, women always feel powerlessness, but not all surrender to fate, and they work hard and strive. Hui's feminist films are rich with women's emotions and female consciousness, making the audiences feel the struggle and warmth of women's lives.

As one of the leading figures of Hong Kong's New Wave, Hui has continuously challenged herself and broadened her film career while bringing the audience surprises. This is highlighted in women's stories forming her artistic style. As a female, Hui has created female images using a film language which is unique in the Hong Kong film industry.

In addition, Hui's works discuss the ideas of race and sex in Asian cultures in a sharp tone. Her semi-autobiography work Song of the Exile is one of the examples, showing how a female's identity has been strugglingly constructed in such a cultural context. Audrey Yue writes, "When it was released in 1990, the film's themes of cross-cultural alienation, inter-ethnic marriage, generational reconciliation and divided loyalties resonated with the British colony's 1997 transition to Chinese sovereignty." This "cunningly metaphoric" is said to be one of the most important features of a Hong Kong director in the last few years.

Of Song of the Exile, Audrey Yue writes, "The central motif is the diaspora as the inheritance of exile ... Unlike the term 'exile' that more specifically refers to the psychological condition of people who have been forcefully removed from the homeland, the concept of 'diaspora' focuses more on the conditions of displacement (and resettlement) in the hostland. Migration, mobile work contracts, globalization and cosmopolitanism have enabled the formation of a new world of shifting populations or ethnoscapes."

Hui's films reflect diverse female images. Firstly, she creates submissive women, for example, with Sum Ching in The Story of Woo Viet (1982), Cam Nuong in Boat People (1982), Mang Tit Lan in Zodiac Killers (1991), and Ling in Night and Fog (2009). Facing the injustice of life, these women will only passively accept the arrangement of fate, and silently endure the hardship of life. Hui gives more attention and sympathy to such women, and such films permeate her deep thinking on female destiny. However, Hui also creates female characters with strong sense of rebellion, such as Bai Liu-Su in Love in a Fallen City (1984), May Sun in Summer Snow (1995), Gu Manzhen in Eighteen Springs (1997), and Xiao Hong in The Golden Era (2014). In these films, women are no longer the submissive and cowardly appendages of traditional patriarchy. Instead, they become women who have the courage to fight for their rights.

Ambiguous references to politics are also present. The political dimensions in Hui's films are unconscious. According to Ka-Fai Yau, Hui has said in an interview that she does not understand politics and therefore just does not think about it. But this denial of the political seems at odds with her films and how spectators have viewed them. She also revealed her attitudes on her intention of constructing the stories by reflecting the conditions in social reality:

Filmmakers usually use their eyes to tell a story very subjectively, mixing in a lot of what they think the situation is and how they react to it, but maybe I should set up the problems in this particular situation clearly and show the dilemma rather than adding my solution and qualifying that objective thing with many personal intrusions.

In an interview with Esther M. K. Cheung, Hui revealed:

I distinctly prefer making realist films with a modern-day setting. I don't like costume films, though I can make them. Sometimes I make films just for the sake of making a living.

"Hui also uses voice-over as a device to link scenes and shots. This is a hallmark of Hui's films. In Hui's features, voice-over functions not solely to (1) narrate the plot and (2) bring to the surface the interior thoughts and feelings of the characters, but also (3) to catalyze the connection between shots. In most cases, voice-over is employed to give oral expression to the interior thoughts and feelings of the characters"

The 2021 documentary film Keep Rolling provides an insight into her life's work. It was directed by Hui's frequent collaborator Man Lim-chung in his directorial debut.

== Filmography ==
=== As filmmaker ===
Year	Title	Role	Notes/Ref.
1978	Below the Lion Rock: From Vietnam; Bridge; Road.	Director	"From Vietnam" - Hui's first part to her Vietnam Trilogy
1979	The Secret	Director	Hui's first feature film. The suspense drama about a real-life double murder.
1980	The Spooky Bunch	Director	A satiric film about a Cantonese opera company that must go to Cheung Chau to perform for a wealthy man haunted by a ghost.
1981	The Story of Woo Viet	Director	Starring Chow Yun-fat, the film is Hui's second part to her Vietnam Trilogy, which follows the story of a South Vietnamese refugee in Hong Kong. It was screened at the Director's Fortnight of the Cannes Film Festival.
1982	Boat People	Director	The third installment of Hui's Vietnam Trilogy. The film was an Official Selection at Cannes and Best Film at the Hong Kong Film Awards
1984	Love in a Fallen City	Director	Taking place just before the Japanese invasion of Hong Kong, a young man pursues an introverted divorcee.
1987	The Romance of Book and Sword	Director/Writer	The first part of Hui's Qing Dynasty epic. The film is based on a novel from an old folk's tale.
1987	Princess Fragrance	Director	The second part of Hui's Qing Dynasty epic. The film journeys through the final half of the Louis Cha's novel The Book and the Sword.
1988	Starry Is the Night	Director	A school counselor has an affair with a young student and parallels a past affair the counselor had with her professor.
1990	Song of the Exile	Director	A film loosely based on Hui's experience of returning to Hong Kong after her time in London. The film also reflects the female protagonist's relationship with her Japanese mother.
1990	The Swordsman (uncredited)	Director	"A kung-fu manual known as the sacred scroll is stolen from the Emperor's library. An army detachment is sent to recover it. Meanwhile, a young swordsman and his fellow disciple are accidentally drawn into the chaos."
1990	My American Grandson	Director	An elderly Chinese man becomes the caretaker of his 12-year-old grandson.
1991	Zodiac Killers	Director	Ben, a Chinese student in Japan, falls for Meng and agrees to help her deliver a tape containing information that could start a war between the yakuza families.
1993	Boy and His Hero	Director	
1995	Summer Snow	Director	A comedy-drama about a working woman and her husband and son. The woman must care for her father-in-law, whom she had never gotten along with. The film has received several awards.
1996	The Stunt Woman	Director	The melodrama about a stunt woman (Michelle Yeoh), who is struggling in Hong Kong's film industry.
1997	Eighteen Springs	Director	A period film of 1930s Shanghai, where a young woman falls in love with a factory worker who is set up with an arranged marriage.
1997	As Time Goes By	Director/Writer	A man regrets his wish for time to speed up when it comes true.
1999	Ordinary Heroes	Director/Producer	The film revolves around the lives of social reform activists in Hong Kong. It competed at the 49th International Berlin Film Festival in 1999.
2001	Visible Secret	Director/Producer	"An unemployed hairdresser and a strange nurse meet at a club and start a romance. Since meeting her, the young man encounters unexplained things which she says are spirits she can see."
2002	July Rhapsody	Director/Producer	The film is about the relationships of a young female student falling in love and seducing her teacher.
2003	Jade Goddess of Mercy	Director	The film is an adaptation of a popular book that describes the lives of everyday police men. The protagonist is a female police officer, who must deal with choices between three men in her life and her career.
2006	The Postmodern Life of My Aunt	Director/Writer	A woman in her sixties discovers she is falling behind in the times, as she loses her job as an English tutor.
2008	The Way We Are	Director	This drama tells the story of a working woman, Kwai, who must take care of her teenage son and ailing mother. Kwai befriends an older woman, and the two learn to help each other.
2009	Night and Fog	Director/Producer	A family struggles in Tin Shui Wai, while a marriage between a husband and wife turns fatal.
2010	All About Love	Director/Producer	The film portrays the difficulty and challenges which lesbians in Hong Kong must face.
2011	A Simple Life	Director/Producer	A story about an elderly female servant, who has watched over a family for many generations.
2014	The Golden Era	Director	With the Republic of China era as the background, this is the story of legendary female writer Xiao Hong's life and loves.
2017	Our Time Will Come	Director	Based on the true story of the "Dong Jiang column", set in the 1940s, the film tells the story of legendary woman Fang Gu (Zhou Xun), who is one of the key figures during the Japanese occupation of Hong Kong.
2020	Love After Love	Director/Producer	Based on Eileen Chang's novella, Aloeswood Incense: The First Brazier, the film is a love story set in 1940s Hong Kong. The film tells the story of a young girl who travels from Shanghai to Hong Kong in pursuit of education, but ends up working for her aunt seducing rich and powerful men.
2020	Septet: The Story of Hong Kong	Director	Seven of Hong Kong's leading filmmakers have come together to each direct a short film set in Hong Kong during one decade from the 1950s to the 2020s.
2023	Elegies	Director	Documentary

=== As actress ===
Ann Hui has appeared mostly in cameo roles in several films:

- Love Massacre (1981)
- Winners and Sinners (1983) - Fast food clerk
- Summer Snow (1995) - Neighbour
- Somebody Up (1996) - Teacher
- Who's the Woman, Who's the Man? (1996)
- The River (1997) - Director
- Jiang hu: The Triad Zone (2000)
- Merry-Go-Round (2001)
- Forever and Ever (2001)
- Fighting to Survive (2002)
- My Name Is Fame (2006) - Film director
- Simply Actors (2007)
- Echoes of the Rainbow (2010) - Kindergarten teacher
- Our Time Will Come (2017) - Interviewer

== Awards and nominations ==
=== Film and television ===
Year	Festival	Category	Nominated work	Result
1983	2nd Hong Kong Film Awards	Best Director	Boat People	Won
1983	2nd Hong Kong Film Awards	Best Picture	Boat People	Won
1988	7th Hong Kong Film Awards	Best Director	The Romance of Book & Sword	Nominated
1990	Asia Pacific Film Festival	Best Film	Song of the Exile	Won
1990	Rimini Festival	Best Film	Song of the Exile	Nominated
1990	Golden Horse Film Festival and Awards	Best Film	Song of the Exile	Nominated
1991	10th Hong Kong Film Awards	Best Director	Song of the Exile	Nominated
1991	10th Hong Kong Film Awards	Best Picture	Song of the Exile	Nominated
1995	45th Berlin International Film Festival	Golden Bear	Summer Snow	Nominated
1995	Golden Horse Film Festival and Awards	Best Film	Summer Snow	Won
1995	Golden Bauhinia Awards	Best Director	Summer Snow	Won
1995	Golden Bauhinia Awards	Best Picture	Summer Snow	Won
1995	Hong Kong Film Critics Society	Best Picture	Summer Snow	Won
1995	Créteil International Women's Film Festival	Best Film	Summer Snow	Won
1995	68th Academy Awards	Best Foreign Language Film	Summer Snow	Not nominated
1996	15th Hong Kong Film Awards	Best Director	Summer Snow	Won
1996	15th Hong Kong Film Awards	Best Picture	Summer Snow	Won
1999	36th Golden Horse Awards	Best Director	Ordinary Heroes	Won
1999	72nd Academy Awards	Best Foreign Language Film	Ordinary Heroes	Not nominated
1999	49th Berlin International Film Festival	Golden Bear	Ordinary Heroes	Nominated
2000	19th Hong Kong Film Awards	Best Director	Ordinary Heroes	Nominated
2001	8th Hong Kong Film Critics Society Awards	Best Director	Visible Secret	Won
2002	21st Hong Kong Film Awards	Best Director	Visible Secret	Nominated
2002	21st Hong Kong Film Awards	Best Director	July Rhapsody	Nominated
2004	26th Moscow International Film Festival	Golden George	Jade Goddess of Mercy	Nominated
2004	Verona Film Festival	Audience Award	Jade Goddess of Mercy	Won
2004	Verona Film Festival	Best Film	Jade Goddess of Mercy	Nominated
2007	14th Hong Kong Film Critics Society Awards	Best Director	The Postmodern Life of My Aunt	Won
2008	27th Hong Kong Film Awards	Best Director	The Postmodern Life of My Aunt	Nominated
2008	15th Hong Kong Film Critics Society Awards	Best Director	The Way We Are	Won
2008	2008 Fukuoka Prize	Grand Prize	Ann Hui	Won
2009	28th Hong Kong Film Awards	Best Director	The Way We Are	Won
2010	29th Hong Kong Film Awards	Best Director	Night and Fog	Nominated
2011	48th Golden Horse Awards	Best Director	A Simple Life	Won
2011	84th Academy Awards	Best Foreign Language Film	A Simple Life	Not nominated
2012	31st Hong Kong Film Awards	Best Director	A Simple Life	Won
2015	34th Hong Kong Film Awards	Best Director	The Golden Era	Won
2015	34th Hong Kong Film Awards	Best Film	The Golden Era	Won
2017	54th Golden Horse Awards	Best Director	Our Time Will Come	Nominated
2018	12th Asian Film Awards	Best Director	Our Time Will Come	Nominated
2018	37th Hong Kong Film Awards	Best Film	Our Time Will Come	Won
2018	37th Hong Kong Film Awards	Best Director	Our Time Will Come	Won

=== Other awards ===
Year	Festival	Category
1997	47th Berlin International Film Festival	Berlinale Camera
1997	Order of the British Empire	Awarded MBE (Member of British Empire)
2012	Hong Kong International Film Festival	Lifetime Achievement Award
2012	Asian Film Awards	Lifetime Achievement Award
2014	19th Busan International Film Festival	Asian Filmmaker of the Year
2020	77th Venice International Film Festival	Golden Lion for Lifetime Achievement
2021	20th New York Asian Film Festival	Star Asia Lifetime Achievement Award
2026	31st Busan International Film Festival	Camellia Award

== See also ==
- List of graduates of University of Hong Kong
- List of female film and television directors
- List of LGBT-related films directed by women
- Hong Kong New Wave
