= Nomad (1982 film) =

1982 Hong Kong film by Patrick Tam

- Film poster
- Directed by: Patrick Tam
- Written by: Chiu Kang-chien; Joyce Chan; Eddie Fong; Kam Ping-hing; John Chan Koon-chung; Patrick Tam
- Produced by: Jeffrey Lau; Dennis Yu
- Starring: Leslie Cheung; Pat Ha; Kent Tong; Cecilia Yip
- Cinematography: David Chung; Bill Wong; Peter Ngor
- Edited by: Cheung Kwok-Kuen
- Music by: Lam Manyee
- Production companies: Century Motion Picture & Dist.
- Release date: 26 November 1982
- Running time: 87 minutes
- Country: Hong Kong
- Language: Cantonese

Nomad (Chinese: 烈火青春) is a 1982 Hong Kong film directed by Patrick Tam. It is about the experiences of a group of youngsters who feel lost and try to find the meaning of life.

At the 1983, the film was nominated eight awards with two of them for Best New Performer with both Pat Ha and Cecilia Yip being nominated. It has since been included on Best-Of lists organized by Hong Kong Film Awards in 2005 and the Hong Kong Film Archive in 2010.

== Plot ==
Louis (Leslie Cheung) is a young man from a rich family and misses his dead mother. He has a good friendship with his cousin Kathy (Pat Ha). Louis and Kathy later meet Tomato (Cecilia Yip), who becomes Louis' girlfriend, and Pong (Kent Tong), who becomes Kathy's boyfriend. The four live a casual life together, hang out aimlessly, and share their dreams and difficulties with one another on frequent trips to Hong Kong's outlying islands. But Kathy's past returns to haunt her. She once lived in Japan, and had a romantic relationship with Shinsuke Takeda (Yung Sai-kit), a member of the Japanese Red Army. He is tired of this work and wants to quit the organization. This leads to the army vowing revenge, so he runs to Kathy to ask for help. They are found by the killers dispatched by the Red Army and both die, while Louis and Tomato, who is pregnant with Louis' child, survive the ordeal.

== Cast ==
- Leslie Cheung as Louis
- Pat Ha as Kathy
- Kent Tong as Pong
- Cecilia Yip as Tomato
- Yip Ha-lei as Pong's dad
- Yung Sai-Kit as Shinsuke Takeda

== Release ==
Nomad was released on 26 November 1982. Nomad was released on blu-ray as a double feature with Tam's My Heart Is That Eternal Rose (1989) by Radiance Films on 24 February 2025.

== Reception ==
In Hong Kong film magazine City Entertainment Film Biweekly, a critic complimented the art direction as maintaining the style established in Tam's previous film Love Massacre (1981) which added a strong atmosphere to the film. The author found that Tam's direction was slightly messy but with many strong moments.

At the 24th Hong Kong Film Awards in 2005, various Asian film critics, film makers and actors voted for the top Chinese films from Hong Kong, Taiwan and China. Nomad was listed at 73rd place on the list.

In 2010, both contemporary and former research officers and programmers of the Hong Kong Film Archive as well as the Director of the Hong Kong International Film Festival and the dean of School of Film & Television at the Hong Kong Academy for Performing Arts submitted a list of the 100 Must-See Hong Kong Movies. Nomad was included on the top 100 list.

== Accolades ==
Organisation	Date of ceremony	Category	Recipient(s)	Result	Ref.
Hong Kong Film Awards	1983	Best Film	—N/a	Nominated	
Hong Kong Film Awards	1983	Best Director	Patrick Tam	Nominated	
Hong Kong Film Awards	1983	Best Actor	Leslie Cheung	Nominated	
Hong Kong Film Awards	1983	Best Screenplay	Chiu Kang-chien, Joyce Chan, Eddie Fong, Kam Ping-hing, John Chan Koon-chung, Patrick Tam	Nominated	
Hong Kong Film Awards	1983	Best Art Direction	Willam Chang	Nominated	
Hong Kong Film Awards	1983	Best New Performer	Cecilia Yip	Nominated	
Hong Kong Film Awards	1983	Best New Performer	Pat Ha	Nominated	
Hong Kong Film Awards	1983	Original Film Score	Man Yee Lam	Nominated	
Hong Kong Film Awards	1983	Best Cinematography	Wong Chung-Biu	Nominated	
