= As Time Goes By (1997 film) =

- VCD cover art
- Directed by: Ann Hui, Vincent Chui
- Screenplay by: Ann Hui
- Produced by: Peggy Chiao; Jiang Feng-Chyi; Ann Hui; Cheng Su-ming
- Starring: Ann Hui; Emily Luk; Michael Luk; Margaret Ng; Dominic Tsim
- Cinematography: Gavin Liew
- Edited by: Poon Hung
- Music by: Lau Chi-yuen
- Production company: Top Focus Productions
- Distributed by: Chinese Television Co.; Are Light Films; Rice Film International; Taiwan Film Centre
- Release date: 1997
- Running time: 58 min.
- Country: Taiwan
- Languages: Cantonese, Mandarin

As Time Goes By (in Chinese 去日苦多) is a 1997 documentary film by the Hong Kong director Ann Hui. The film, part of the Taiwan-produced series "Personal Memoir of Hong Kong", is both a self-portrait and a depiction of Hong Kong during the 40 years preceding the handover by the United Kingdom to China.
