= Chen Shu (actress) =

Chinese singer and actress (born 1977)

- 陈数
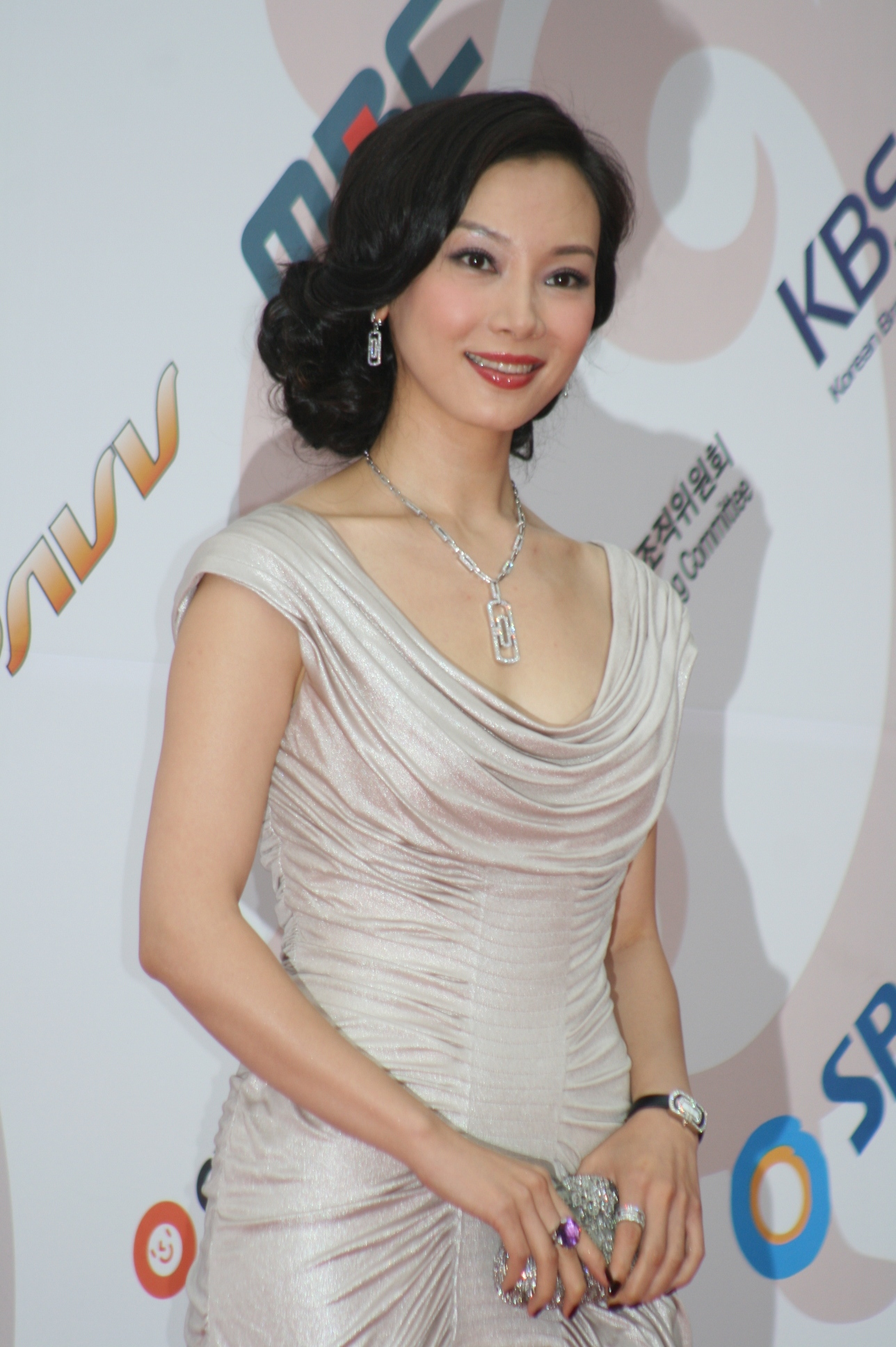
- Chen in 2009
- Born: Chen Shu (陈澍); March 9, 1977 (age 49); Huangshi, Hubei, China
- Education: Medium Dance School affiliated to Beijing Dance Academy; Central Academy of Drama
- Occupation: Actress
- Years active: 2000–present
- Agent: Bravo Stars
- Spouse: Zhao Yinyin (m. 2011)
- Parent: Chen Zongshan (father)

Chinese name
- Traditional Chinese: 陳數
- Simplified Chinese: 陈数
Transcriptions
Standard Mandarin
- Hanyu Pinyin: Chén Shù

Chen Shu
- Traditional Chinese: 陳澍
- Simplified Chinese: 陈澍
Transcriptions
Standard Mandarin
- Hanyu Pinyin: Chén Shù

Chen Shu (born 3 September 1977) is a Chinese singer and actress.

== Early life and education ==
Chen was born Chen Shu (Chinese: 陈澍) in Huangshi, Hubei, in a musical family, the daughter of Chen Zongshan (Chinese: 陈宗善), a dancer in Huangshi. Her maternal grandparents were professors at Hubei University.

Chen studied at Medium Dance School affiliated to Beijing Dance Academy and worked as an actress in China Song and Dance Ensemble from 1992 to 1999. Chen graduated from Central Academy of Drama in 2001, where she majored in acting.

== Career ==
After graduation, Chen joined the National Theatre Company of China.

Chen made her acting debut in Urban Sky (2000), playing Mao Xiaoqi. Chen's first film role was uncredited appearance in the film Vast Sky (2002).

In 2008, Chen starred as Bai Liusu in the romantic comedy television series Love in a Fallen City, adapted from Eileen Chang's novel of the same title. That same year, she had a cameo appearance in The Founding of a Republic, a historical film.

Chen won the Golden Eagle Award for Best Actress for her performance in Iron Pear (2010).

In 2012, Chen starred as Amy in the suspense film The Second Woman.

In 2015, Chen Starred as Zhu Tao, deputy chief scientist at the China National Space Administration in Epic Sci-fi Film The Martian.

== Personal life ==
On 16 September 2011, Chen married Chinese-Australian musician Zhao Yinyin (Chinese: 赵胤胤), a graduate of the Sydney Conservatorium of Music and The Juilliard School.

== Filmography ==
=== Film ===
Year	English title	Chinese title	Role	Ref.
2002	Vast Sky	声震长空	Zheng Zhiyu	
2009	The Founding of a Republic	建国大业		
2012	The Second Woman	情谜		
2015	The Martian	火星救援	Zhu Tao, Deputy Chief Scientist of the CNSA	
2015	Fall in Love Like a Star	怦然星动	Manager	
2019	Hunt Down	长安道		
2019	The Captain	中国机长	cameo	
2020	My People My Hometown	我和我的家乡	Principal Jiang	
2021	Cloudy Mountain	峰爆	Ding, Yajun	

=== Television series ===
Year	English title	Chinese title	Role	Notes/Ref.
2000	Urban Sky	城市上空的惊鸟	Ma Xiaoqi	
2001	Empty Mirror	空镜子	Li Qing	
2001		危险进程	Xia Xiaoyu	
2001	Traveler's Story	旅人的故事	Zhu Mei	
2002		铿锵玫瑰	Zhang Zihui	
2003		伊田事件	Lu Shan	
2003	Don't Abandon This Life	不弃今生	Xin Qi	
2003		无愧苍生	Lu Bingbing	
2003	Public Security Bureau Chief 3	公安局长3幻灭	Feng Yunu	
2004		古城谍影	Ge Yinhong	
2004	Besieged City	穿越围城	Ai Xin	
2005	Medical Record	病案追踪	Song Qian	
2005		聂耳	Feng Yunyan	
2005	Plot Against	暗算	Huang Yiyi	
2006	Shanghai Bund	新上海滩	Fang Yanyun	
2007		食人鱼事件	Shen Ou	
2008	A Poem for the Oak	相思树	Shang Jie	
2009	Love in a Fallen City	倾城之恋	Bai Liusu	
2010	Iron Pear	铁梨花	Tie Lihua	
2011	General	将·军	Shen Hongyu	
2012	Husband and Wife Those Matters	夫妻那些事	Lin Jun	
2012		正者无敌	Shen Hong	
2013	Naive Faces Reality	天真遇到现实	Yang Tianzhen	
2014	Theater	剧场	Yu Zhu	
2014	Generation of Dignity	一代枭雄	Cheng Lixue	
2014	Honey Bee Man	我爱男闺蜜	Ye Shan	
2014	Old City Past Events	古城往事	Huang Anqi	
2014	Negotiations Sweetheart	谈判冤家	Qiao Chu	
2016	A Love for Separation	小别离	Chen Jie	Cameo
2017	Fighter of the Destiny	择天记	Queen of Sheng	
2018	Peace Hotel	和平饭店	Chen Shengying	
2019	Behind The Scenes	幕后之王	You Hailun	Special appearance
2020	Perfect Partner	完美关系	Si Jiaola	
2020	Wrinkle, Women, Wonderful?			GQ web series
2020	Get Married Or Not	谁说我结不了婚		
2020	Heroes in Harm’s Way	最美逆行者		
2020	Together	在一起		
TBA	Zhaoge	朝歌	Nüwa	

=== Theater ===
Year	English title	Chinese title	Role	Ref.
1998	The Sound of Music	音乐之声	The daughter	
2001	Breakthrough	突出重围	Fang Yi	
2008	The Sun Rises	日出	Chen Bailu	
2009	Jane Eyre	简·爱	Jane Eyre	
2017	The Lady from the Sea	海上夫人	Ai Lida	

== Awards and nominations ==
Year	Nominated work	Award	Category	Result	Ref.
2010	Love in a Fallen City	4th Huading Awards	Best Actress (Romance series)	Won	
2011	Iron Pear	17th Shanghai Television Festival	Best Actress	Won	
2011	Iron Pear	6th Huading Awards	Best Actress	Won	
2012	Iron Pear	26th China TV Golden Eagle Award	Best Actress	Won	
2013	Invincible	19th Shanghai Television Festival	Best Actress	Nominated	
2018	Peace Hotel	24th Huading Awards	Best Actress	Won	
2019	Peace Hotel	6th The Actors of China Award Ceremony	Best Actress (Sapphire)	Nominated	
2019	Hunt Down	11th Macau International Movie Festival	Best Supporting Actress	Won	
2020	—N/a	7th The Actors of China Award Ceremony	Best Actress (Sapphire)	Won	
