= The Way We Are (film) =

- Film poster
- Directed by: Ann Hui
- Written by: Lou Shiu-Wa
- Starring: Paw Hee-Ching; Leung Chun-lung; Idy Chan; Chan Lai-wun; Vincent Chui; Clifton Ko
- Cinematography: Charlie Lam
- Edited by: Chow Cheung-kan
- Music by: Chan Si-lok
- Release dates: 27 March 2008 (Hong Kong International Film Festival); 17 July 2008
- Country: Hong Kong

The Way We Are (天水圍的日與夜) is a 2008 Hong Kong drama film directed by Ann Hui and starring Paw Hee-Ching, Chan Lai-wun, Leung Chun-lung and Idy Chan.

== Plot ==
Paw Hee-Ching and Leung Chun-lung play a mother and son who live in Tin Shui Wai New Town. Paw works in the local supermarket while Leung is a Form 5 student who is waiting for his HKCEE results during summer holiday.

Paw meets Chan Lai-wun as she is hired at the supermarket, and begins to help her out. Chan wants to buy a television set but is discouraged by the delivery fee. Paw asks Leung to come to the electrical store to help carry it to Chan's flat, saving her the transport fee. Chan returns the favour by giving Paw a bag of expensive Chinese mushrooms.

Paw's mother falls sick and Leung visits her in the hospital with his cousin. Their grandmother demands swallow's nest congee.

Through her deceased daughter, Chan has a grandson who lives with her son-in-law, who has since remarried. Chan purchases gifts for them and goes with Paw to meet them in Shatin, but her grandson does not show up and her gifts are rejected by her son-in-law. She gives them to Paw instead, who agrees to safeguard them for the time being.

While running an errand for his mother Leung runs into his school teacher (Idy Chan). She invites him to help out at the school as a student counsellor when he returns for Form 6 and he duly agrees.

Paw's two younger brothers are doing well in life, thanks to Paw's financial support during their university years overseas. One of them, played by Clifton Ko, talks to Leung and promises he and his younger brother will support him financially to study overseas if he so desires. He replies that he will decide after seeing his HKCEE results. At the end of the movie, Paw, Leung and Chan are seen happily having dinner together in Tin Shui Wai as Leung has received satisfactory results in his exam and can continue on to Form 6.

== Critical reception ==
The film received great critical acclaim.

According to Perry Lam of Muse, "The Way We Are is a great film in a small way and, in its tribute to the resilience of life, serves as an apt, shining metaphor for the filmmaking career of Hui herself."

== Awards and nominations ==
28th Hong Kong Film Awards

- Won: Best Director (Ann Hui)
- Won: Best Screenplay (Lou Shiu Wa)
- Won: Best Actress (Paw Hee-Ching)
- Won: Best Supporting Actress (Chan Lai Wun)
- Nominated: Best Film
- Nominated: Best New Performer (Juno Leung)

15th Hong Kong Film Critics Society Awards

- Won: Best Film
- Won: Best Director (Ann Hui)
- Won: Best Actress (Paw Hee-Ching)

2008 Hong Kong Film Directors' Guild Awards

- Won: Recommended Film of the Year (Note: Later renamed to Best Film)
- Won: Outstanding Director of the Year (Ann Hui) (Note: Later renamed to Best Director)
- Won: New Performer of the Year - Silver Award (Juno Leung) (Note: Later renamed to Best New Performer)

== See also ==
- Besieged City, a 2008 film directed by Lawrence Ah Mon, set in Tin Shui Wai.

== Notes ==
Awards and achievements
| Preceded by The Postmodern Life of My Aunt | Hong Kong Film Critics Society Awards for Best Film; 2008 | Succeeded by KJ: Music and Life |
