= Cecilia Yip =

Hong Kong actress (born 1963)

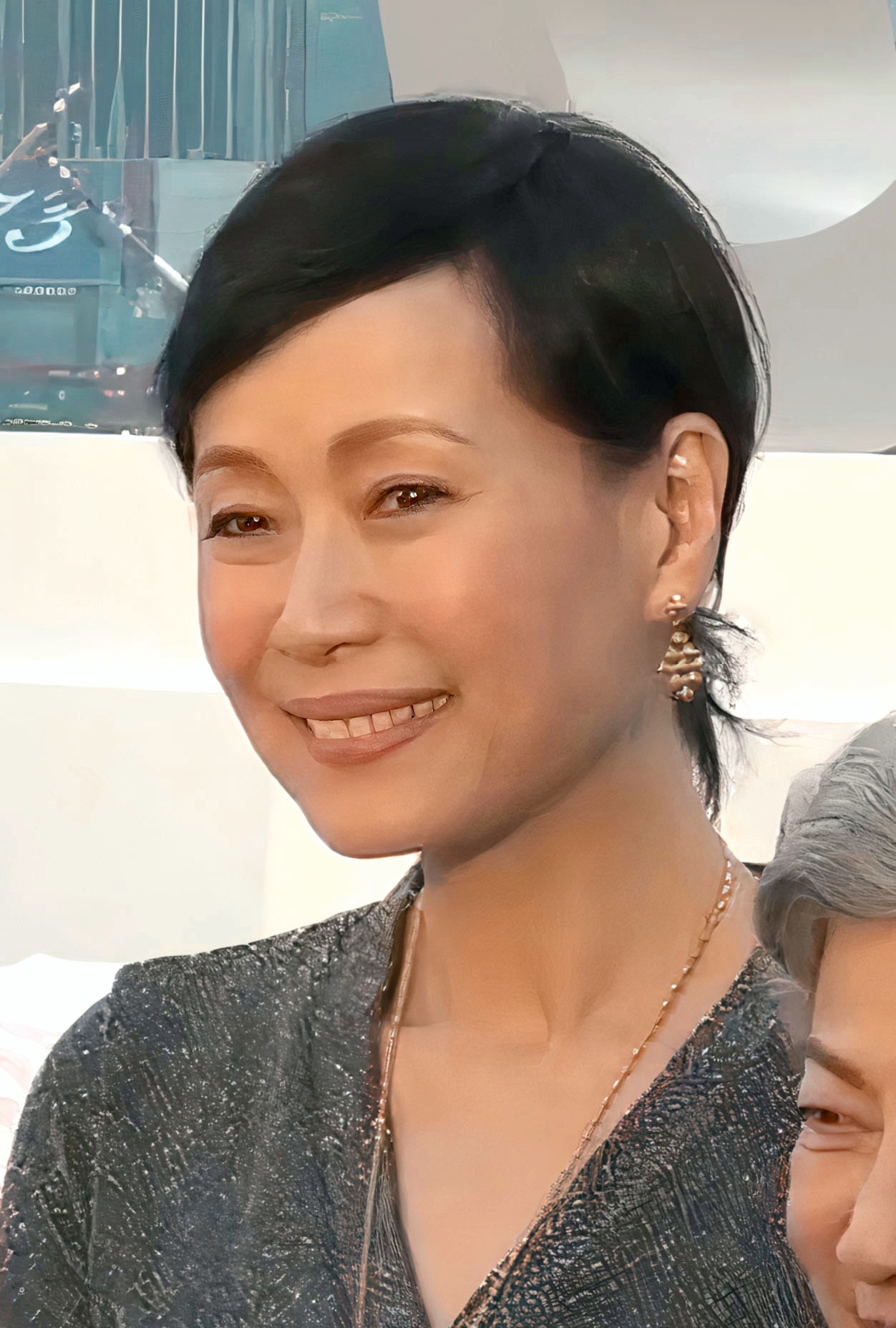
- Yip in 2019
- Born: Lee Sze Sze (李思思); 8 March 1963 (age 63); Hong Kong
- Years active: 1982 - present
- Spouse: Chan Kwok-hei
- Awards: Hong Kong Film Awards – Best Actress; 1984 - Let's Make Laugh; 1992 - This Thing Called Love; Best Supporting Actress; 1990 - Beyond the Sunset

Chinese name
- Traditional Chinese: 葉童
- Simplified Chinese: 叶童
Transcriptions
Standard Mandarin
- Hanyu Pinyin: Yè Tóng
Yue: Cantonese
- Jyutping: jip^{6} tung^{4}

Cecilia Yip Tung (Chinese: 葉童; born 8 March 1963) is a Hong Kong actress whose work is known throughout Asia, especially in mainland China, Hong Kong and Taiwan.

== Career ==
She began her acting career in 1982 with Nomad for which she was nominated for the Best New Performer Award. She won the Hong Kong Film Award for Best Actress in 1984. Yip has starred in 45 feature-length films, receiving several nominations and awards. In addition to film, Yip has expanded her acting to television and was nominated for the 30th Taiwan Golden Bell Best Actress Award for her performance in the 1993 television series The Heaven Sword and Dragon Saber. She also played the lead role in four stage plays.

== Filmography ==
=== Television series ===
| Year | Title | Role | Notes |
|---|---|---|---|
| 1989 | Blood of Good and Evil | Chung Chen | |
| 1991 | Bihai Qingtian | Yue Ying | |
| 1992 | New Legend of Madame White Snake | Xu Xian / Xu Shi Lin | |
| 1993 | The Heaven Sword and Dragon Saber | Zhao Min / Yin Susu | Nominated - Golden Bell Award for Best Actress in a TV Series |
| 2002 | Back To Square One | Yan Sin-mei | |
| 2003 | The Driving Power | Lok Fu-yung | |
| 2003 | The Rose | Hon Li | |
| 2007 | Men Don't Cry | Ling Yuk Tsui | Nominated - TVB Anniversary Award for Best Actress; Nominated - TVB Anniversary Award for My Favourite Female Character |
| 2007 | The Family Link | Hilary Ting Mui-Heung | |
| 2010 | Growing Through Life | Liza Cheng Ming-chu | |
| 2010 | A Story of Lala's Promotion | Wei Weian | |
| 2012 | Luan Shi Jia Ren | Xu Hui | |
| 2012 | Xuan-Yuan Sword: Scar of Sky | Shan Yuwu | |
| 2019 | The Legend of White Snake (新白娘子传奇) | Xu Xian's mother | |
| 2020 | Hong Kong Love Stories | Mrs Chow | |
| 2021 | Generation Slash | Emma | EP16-20 |

=== Films ===
| Year | Title | Role | Awards |
|---|---|---|---|
| 1982 | Nomad | Tomato | Nominated - Hong Kong Film Award for Best New Performer |
| 1982 | Coolie Killer | | |
| 1983 | Let's Make Laugh | Yeung Noi-dong | Won - Hong Kong Film Award for Best Actress |
| 1983 | Winners and Sinners | Ceci | |
| 1983 | Esprit d'amour | Ivy | |
| 1984 | Hong Kong 1941 | Han Yuk Nam | Nominated - Hong Kong Film Award for Best Actress |
| 1985 | Infatuation | | |
| 1986 | Last Song in Paris | Yuan Yu-Shih | |
| 1986 | Strange Bedfellow | | |
| 1986 | My Heavenly Lover | | |
| 1987 | Amnesty Decree | | |
| 1987 | Two Wonder Women | | |
| 1987 | Reincarnation | Liu Ah-Yu | |
| 1988 | Chaos by Design | | |
| 1988 | Fumbling Cops | | |
| 1988 | Carry on Hotel | Boy George | |
| 1989 | Beyond the Sunset | Pearl | Won - Hong Kong Film Award for Best Supporting Actress |
| 1989 | Set Me Free | | |
| 1989 | The Final Judgement | Cheung Tsui Fung | |
| 1990 | Rebel from China | Yip Mei-Ling | |
| 1990 | The Swordsman | Kiddo | |
| 1991 | To Be Number One | Tse | Nominated - Hong Kong Film Award for Best Supporting Actress |
| 1991 | This Thing Called Love | | Won - Hong Kong Film Award for Best Actress |
| 1991 | Weakness of Man | | |
| 1991 | Center Stage | Lim Cho Cho | |
| 1992 | Call Girl '92 | Nancy | |
| 1993 | Lord of East China Sea II | Donna | |
| 1993 | Lord of East China Sea | Donna Mang | |
| 1993 | Love Among the Triad | | |
| 1993 | Crazy Hong Kong | Winnie | |
| 1993 | Legal Innocence | Shirley Cheng | |
| 1994 | Organized Crime & Triad Bureau | Cindy | |
| 1994 | Right Here Waiting | | |
| 1994 | King of the Sea | | |
| 1995 | Peace Hotel | Shau Siu Man / Lam Ling | Nominated - Hong Kong Film Award for Best Actress |
| 1995 | Love, Guns & Glass | Lau Yuk-Ching | |
| 1995 | Faithfully Yours | Kitty | |
| 1997 | My Dad Is a Jerk | Yip Ting | |
| 2000 | Miles Apart | Janice Chan | |
| 2001 | God of Fist Style | Aunt Wing | Nominated - Hong Kong Film Award for Best Supporting Actress |
| 2001 | What Time Is It There? | Woman in Paris | |
| 2002 | May & August | | Nominated - Hong Kong Film Award for Best Supporting Actress |
| 2002 | Happy Family | Mrs. Han | |
| 2008 | Ticket | Sister Tseng | |
| 2014 | The White Haired Witch of Lunar Kingdom | | |
| 2015 | Love, At First | | |
| 2016 | Beautiful 2016 | | |
| 2016 | New York New York | | |
| 2018 | Distinction | | |
| 2018 | Still Human | | |
| 2019 | The Business Storm of Ruhai | | |
| 2019 | The Lady Improper | | |
| 2019 | Jade Dynasty | Shuiyue Master | |
| 2023 | Love Never Ends | Zhao Huanxin | Nominated - Golden Rooster Award for Best Supporting Actress |

Awards and achievements
| Preceded by Becky Lam for Lonely Fifteen | Hong Kong Film Awards for Best Actress; 1984 for Let's Make Laugh | Succeeded by Siqin Gaowa for Homecoming |
| Preceded by Sarah Lee for School on Fire | Hong Kong Film Awards for Best Supporting Actress; 1990 for Beyond the Sunset | Succeeded by Rain Lau for Queen of Temple Street |
| Preceded by Carol Cheng for Her Fatal Ways | Hong Kong Film Awards for Best Actress; 1992 for This Thing Called Love | Succeeded by Maggie Cheung for Center Stage |
