= Love in a Fallen City (TV series) =

Chinese television series

- Starring: Chen Shu; Huang Jue
- Country of origin: China
- Original language: Mandarin

Love in a Fallen City is a 2009 Chinese television series based on Eileen Chang's 1943 novella of the same name. The series was directed by Mengji and produced by Zou Jingzhi, who also wrote the adapted screenplay.

== Cast ==
- Chen Shu as Bai Liusu
- Huang Jue as Fan Liuyuan
- Wang Xuebing as Tang Yiyuan
- Liu Yihan as Bai Baoluo
- Wang Yuanke as Hong Lian
- Zheng Yuzhi
- Kong Xiangyu
- Ning Wentong
- Zhang Zhihua
- Guan Shaozeng
- Chen Liangping as Bai Liangyue
- Cao Yanyan
- Gao Liang as Bai Liangyong
- Zhang Xixi
- Cheng Lisha

== Broadcast ==
- Taiwan — Much TV (January 19, 2009)
- China — CCTV-8 (March 14, 2009)
- Hong Kong — Asia Television (March 1, 2010, dubbed in Cantonese)
