= Tammy Cheung =

Hong Kong documentary filmmaker

Tammy Cheung Hung (born 1958) is a Hong Kong documentary filmmaker. She is regarded as the earliest independent filmmaker in Hong Kong to devote herself to documentary. She also founded Visible Record (采風電影) and organized documentary events locally.

== Early life and education ==
Born in Shanghai, China in 1958, Cheung moved to Hong Kong at a young age and grew up there. In the mid-1980s, she went to Montreal, Quebec, Canada, to study film at Concordia University. Initially intended to pursue communication theory, she ultimately decided to focus on filmmaking. While aboard Canada, she established the Chinese International Film Festival, which showcased films by Chinese filmmakers and works featuring Chinese themes. She served as director of the festival from 1986 to 1992. After returning to Hong Kong in 1994, Cheung worked as a production assistant, wrote film reviews, and taught film courses. In 2000, she worked as a translator at a foreign bank earning a generous salary, but she later left the job to pursue a filmmaking career.

== Career ==
In 1999, she made her directory debut and her first documentary film, Invisible Women, which follows the lives of three Sindi Indian women in Hong Kong. She is an admirer of the American filmmaker Frederick Wiseman, and uses the style of Direct Cinema in her films. Filmed in a Band 1 boys' schools and a girls' school, her documentary Secondary School (2002) presents everyday classroom life without commentary. It sparked discussion about the current education system in Hong Kong.

Her Moving (2003) documents the livelihood and daily struggles of the poor and the elderly in Ngau Tau Kok Estate. The film follows the residents after their relocation with the help of two social workers. Her Rice Distribution (2003) documents a Chinese Ghost Festival rice giveaway event. The police played clips of the documentary to highlight the problems associated with the event at a Wong Tai Sin District Council meeting, contributing improvements in its organization.

Since 2004, her works turns to more political topics. Her film July (2004) recorded the 1 July march of 2003 in Hong Kong, capturing the perspectives of participants during the social moment. Stylistically, July is more direct, without narration or voice-over commentaries. And, Election is a documentary about the 2004 Legislative Council elections and was presented at the 2009 Hong Kong International Film Festival. It can be considered a sequel to July.

In 2004, with other like-minded individuals from the fields of film, culture and education, Cheung founded Visible Record, which distributes and promotes documentary films in Hong Kong. The non-profit organisation also hosts the annual Chinese Documentary Festival.

== Documentaries ==
- Invisible Women (1999)
- Secondary School (2002)
- Moving (2003)
- Rice Distribution (2003)
- July (2004)
- Speaking Up (2005)
- Speaking Up 2 (2007)
- Election
