= The Story of Woo Viet =

1981 Hong Kong film by Ann Hui

- Film poster
- Traditional Chinese: 胡越的故事
- Simplified Chinese: 胡越的故事
- Hanyu Pinyin: Hú Yuè De Gù Shì
- Jyutping: Wu4 Jyut6 Dik1 Gu3 Si6
- Directed by: Ann Hui
- Written by: Alfred Cheung
- Produced by: Teddy Robin
- Starring: Chow Yun-fat; Cora Miao; Lo Lieh; Cherie Chung
- Cinematography: Bill Wong
- Edited by: Kin Kin
- Music by: Lam Manyee
- Release date: 24 April 1981
- Running time: 92 minutes
- Countries: Hong Kong; Philippines; Vietnam
- Language: Cantonese

The Story of Woo Viet is a 1981 Hong Kong political drama directed by Ann Hui and starring Chow Yun-fat as the title character, Woo Viet. The assistant director was Stanley Kwan and the action choreographer was Ching Siu-tung.

The film was one of the first political dramas made in Hong Kong. It used the story of Vietnamese refugees (boat people) to reflect on Hong Kong's handling of the refugee issue, and also on Hong Kong's sentiment regarding their uncertain future of sovereignty at the time. It is also the second part of Ann Hui's Vietnamese trilogy.

The movie features a famous Cantonese song, "This is Love", sung by Teddy Robin, the producer of this movie.

In the United States, the film is marketed under the title God of Killers, capitalizing on Chow's popularity in heroic bloodshed films.

== Plot ==
Woo Viet is an overseas Chinese from Vietnam. He is one of many refugees fleeing Vietnam by boat to Hong Kong. While in a detention camp, he realizes that many refugees are being murdered. He decides to leave Hong Kong as quickly as possible by obtaining a forged passport. He meets a beautiful woman, Shum Ching, who also wants to go to the United States. During a layover in Manila, Shum Ching and other women discover that they are being trafficked into prostitution. Woo Viet does not get on a plane to go to America. Instead, he remains in the Philippines to rescue Shum Ching. There he encounters local Chinatown mob boss Mr Chung and his knife throwing Filipino henchman Migual. Mr. Chung, a local mob boss, makes a deal with Woo Viet to work as an assassin in exchange for Shum Ching's safety. However, Mr. Chung eventually betrays Woo Viet. Sum Ching is killed by Migual during a botched escape during a mission. Woo Viet kills Migual and Mr. Chung in revenge. The movie ends with Woo Viet burying Sum Ching at sea and escaping by boat to the United States realizing there is no reason and purpose for him to stay in Manila any longer.

== Cast ==
(as on the film print end credits)

- Chow Yun-fat as Woo Viet
- Cora Miao as Lee Lap-quan
- Lo Lieh as Sahm
- Cherie Chung as Sum Ching
- Gam Biu as Mr Chung Yan
- Tong Kam Tong as Snakehead
- Lam Ying Fat as Vietnamese Boy Refugee
- Chan To Kit as Elderly Vietnamese Man Refugee
- Homer Cheung Hung Cheong as Viet Special Agent (Camp Killer)
- Chung Cheun Ying as Japanese-language Teacher
- Fung Yun Chuen as Human Trafficker in Hong Kong
- Dave Brodett as Migual
- Josie Shoemaker as Mamasan
- Ramon D'Salva as Filipino with Moustache in Church
- Ben Makalalay as Ricardo (Bald Filipino in Brothel)
- Greg Lozano as Gerald
- Fanny Serrano as Transvestite
- Rasauro Gotaco as Hostage

== Home Video ==
The 2019 remastered DVD and Blu-ray Disc from CN Entertainment for the Hong Kong market have an 85 minute version of the movie that is missing some scenes. Among these are the strangling of a refugee in the detainment camp and the killing of a kidnapping victim in the Philippines.
