= The Imp (1981 film) =

1981 Hong Kong film by Dennis Yu

- Theatrical release poster
- Directed by: Dennis Yu
- Screenplay by: Cheung Kam-moon; Kam Ping-Hing; Dang Lee
- Produced by: Wong Chan-sin
- Starring: Charlie Chin; Dorothy Chi-hsia Yu; Hua Yueh
- Cinematography: Bob Thompson
- Edited by: Yu Kwok-fung
- Production companies: Century Motion Picture & Dist.
- Release date: 5 November 1981 (Hong Kong)
- Running time: 95 minutes
- Country: Hong Kong
- Language: Cantonese

The Imp (兇榜; Taiwan name:魔界轉世/魔界轉生) is a 1981 Hong Kong horror film directed by Dennis Yu. In the film, a rookie security guard is targeted for killing by an imp. The imp eventually inhabits the body of the guard's newborn baby through spirit possession. The guard decides to commit infanticide by axe murder.

== Plot ==
With a pregnant wife at home, Keung has been struggling to find a job when he finally finds work as a security guard in a commercial building. Strange incidents occur in the building and his colleagues begin to die one by one in horrible ways due to an imp.

A geomancer warns Keung that he will be the next victim and teaches him how to avoid fate. But Keung discovers the imp is trying to possess his baby. Failing to stop this, the ending shows him trying to kill the baby with an axe.

== Cast ==
- Chan Shen - Old uncle Han
- Kent Cheng - Fatty
- Charlie Chin -Cheung Ging-Keung
- Wong Ching - Mr. Hong Kong
- Yueh Hua (credited as Wah Ngor)
- Yu Yi-ha

== Reception ==
Devon B. from Digital Retribution awarded the film a score of 1/5, writing, "The Imp is a somewhat slow movie that lacks any real eeriness until the climax." Peter Nepstad from The Illuminated Lantern awarded the film 4/4 stars, praising the film's characterizations, and slow build of supernatural tension.
