= Love in a Fallen City (film) =

1984 Hong Kong film by Ann Hui

- Theatrical poster

Chinese name
- Traditional Chinese: 傾城之戀
Transcriptions
Yue: Cantonese
- Jyutping: King1 Sing4 zi1 Lyun2
- Directed by: Ann Hui
- Screenplay by: Fengcho
- Based on: Love in a Fallen City by Eileen Chang
- Produced by: Lawrence Wong
- Starring: Chow Yun-fat; Cora Miao; Chiao Chiao; Geung Cheung Ping
- Cinematography: Tony Hope
- Edited by: Chow Cheung Kan
- Music by: Lam Man Yee
- Distributed by: Shaw Brothers Studio
- Release date: 2 August 1984
- Running time: 93 minutes
- Country: Hong Kong
- Language: Cantonese
- Box office: HK$$8,134,727

Love in a Fallen City is a 1984 Hong Kong film directed by Ann Hui. It was adapted from the novella of the same name by Eileen Chang, and produced by Shaw Brothers Studio. The movie stars Chow Yun-fat and Cora Miao as the romantic leads.

The film followed in the trail of Hui's critically acclaimed Vietnam film Boat People but was a much more modest commercial success. The movie earned HK$8,134,727., Ann Hui adapted another Eileen Chang novel thirteen years later in Eighteen Springs.

== Plot ==
The film is set in 1940s Shanghai and Hong Kong. Bai Liu-Su (Cora Miao) is an introverted divorcée who has her fair share of misery after breaking up with her good-for-nothing husband. Her large, extended family feels she has shamed them through divorce. Her situation at home has become unbearable. A charming Malayan businessman based in Hong Kong, Fan Liu-yuan (Chow Yun-Fat), who is always surrounded by women, happens to visit Shanghai and becomes interested in Bai after chancing on her through mutual friends. Fan sees in Bai what many others don't and tries his best to make her fall in love again. A middle-aged couple tries to matchmake the two.

Bai takes a gamble and decides to visit Hong Kong with the Japanese invasion of China looming, willing to risk all just to get out of her awkward family situation; even though she falls for Fan, future is uncertain. It is only through surviving war-torn Hong Kong as civilians that the two realize that they truly love each other.

== Awards ==
Love in a Fallen City won the Best Original Film Score (Lam Man-Yi) in the 1985 Hong Kong Film Awards. It was nominated for a further three awards, which it did not win:

- Best Supporting Actress (Chiao Chiao)
- Best Cinematography (Anthony Hope)
- Best Art Direction (Tony Au).

Costume designer Wong Yiu Lin was awarded the Best Costume Design award for the 1984 Golden Horse Awards.
