= The Secret (1979 film) =

1979 Hong Kong film by Ann Hui

- Film poster
- Directed by: Ann Hui
- Written by: Joyce Chan
- Produced by: Law Hoi-muk; Li Yulan (李玉蘭)
- Starring: Sylvia Chang; Angie Chiu; Norman Chui; Lai Cheuk-cheuk; Alex Man
- Cinematography: David Chung (鍾志文)
- Edited by: Yu Chan-fung (余燦峰)
- Music by: Lam Manyee
- Release date: 1 November 1979
- Running time: 85 minutes (edited); 90 minutes (restored)
- Country: Hong Kong
- Language: Cantonese

The Secret (Chinese: 瘋劫) is a 1979 Hong Kong thriller film directed by Ann Hui. It is Hui's debut feature film.

== Plot ==
The plot is based on the "Double Corpse Murder Case" that happened on Mount Lung Fu in 1970.

== Production ==
The film was loosely based on a real-life double murder in Pok Fu Lam in May 1970. As reported by the South China Morning Post on 18 May 1970, a young man and woman were found dead on a hill on Pok Fu Lam Road the night before. The couple had been strangled, and had their hands bound behind them.

== Release and reception ==
The Secret was released in Hong Kong on 1 November 1979. According to a positive review by Asian Movie Pulse, The Secret is a "bright debut for a directress that managed to analyse Hong Kong identity within the frame of a commercial success".

=== Accolades ===
The film received two awards at the 17th Golden Horse Awards: Best Cinematography (David Chung), and Best Film Editing (Yu Chan-fung). It also earned three nominations for Best Narrative Feature, Best Director (Hui), and Best Original Screenplay (Chan).

== Post-release ==
In 2017, the Hong Kong Film Archive restored The Secret using newly-discovered footage. Missing scenes and the film's dialogue track were sourced from Betacam and VHS copies of the film. The runtime of the restored version is 90 minutes, five minutes longer than the edited version. The Hong Kong Film Archive later issued the restored version on Blu-ray in 2019, re-releasing a second edition in 2022.

== Legacy ==
The Hong Kong Film Awards listed The Secret at number 31 in its ranking of the Best 100 Chinese Motion Pictures in 2005. This list was voted on by a panel of industry professionals. In 2011, the Hong Kong Film Archive included The Secret in its 100 Must-See Hong Kong Films exhibition in 2011. This programme consisted of films considered by the curators to be the most representative of Hong Kong cinema.
