= Hai Yan =

Chinese writer and producer

Si Haiyan
- Born: November 7, 1954 (age 71); Beijing, China
- Children: 1

Si Haiyan (born 7 November 1954), usually credited as Hai Yan, is a Chinese writer and producer. He's generally considered one of China's most popular screenwriters, and his stories are generally adapted and remade into films and television series. Hai Yan frequently blends crime/detective elements with love stories. He and Zhao Baogang (赵宝刚) who directed many of his adaptations have "become synonymous with Chinese-made youth dramas".
