= Patrick Tam (film director) =

Hong Kong film director (born 1948)

- 譚家明
- Born: Patrick Tam Kar-ming; 25 March 1948 (age 78); Hong Kong
- Occupations: Film director; film editor

Patrick Tam Ka-ming (Chinese: 譚家明; born 25 March 1948) is a Hong Kong film director and film editor. He is known as the seminal figure of Hong Kong New Wave

== Career ==
Patrick Tam was born in 1948. As a teenager, he was avid film goer and wrote reviews and made film shorts on 16mm cameras. Like many of the other members of Hong Kong New Wave films, Tam began in television. He worked at TVB starting out as a prop assistant in 1967. By 1975, he was directing the stations tops programs like Superstar Special. When he was offered a sabbatical to study filmmaking in San Francisco, he spent most of the time at the Pacific Film Archive watching films.

He returned to Hong Kong in 1976 directing episodes of the Hong Kong cop show C.I.D. and then the series he was most known for with Seven Women. His last major television production was the 10-part series titled 13 in 1977.

His first film was The Sword (1980), a wuxia film.

Tam directed the 1987 film Final Victory, scripted by Wong Kar-wai. He edited Wong Kar-wai's Days of Being Wild, contributing the cameo appearance of Tony Leung Chi-wai in the last scene, and Ashes of Time, as well as Johnnie To's Election.

As part of Hong Kong's New Wave of film directors in the late 1970s and 1980s, Tam's work enjoys great acclaim. According to the Hong Kong film critic Perry Lam, writing in Muse magazine, "[Tam's] unpredictable digressions and swift changes of scene can evoke a dreamer's logic, but his sound and images are always sharp and particular."

As of 2006, Tam was an assistant professor at the School of Creative Media, City University of Hong Kong.

== Filmography ==
=== Films ===
- 1980 The Sword (director, writer)
- 1981 Love Massacre (director)
- 1982 Nomad (director, writer)
- 1984 Cherie (director, writer)
- 1987 Final Victory (director)
- 1988 Burning Snow (director, editor, art director)
- 1989 My Heart Is That Eternal Rose (director)
- 1990 Days of Being Wild (editor)
- 1994 Ashes of Time (editor)
- 2002 Dare Ya! (editor)
- 2005 Election (editor)
- 2006 After This Our Exile (director, editor, film editing supervisor, writer)
- 2014 That Demon Within (editor)
- 2020 Septet: The Story of Hong Kong (director, segment "Tender Is the Night", writer, editor)

== See also ==
- Cinema of Hong Kong
- Cinema of mainland China

Awards
Preceded by Johnnie To for Election	Hong Kong Film Award for Best Director; 2007 for After This Our Exile	Vacant Awards suspended
Preceded by Yau Nai-Hoi, Yip Tin-Shing for Election	Hong Kong Film Award for Best Screenplay; 2007 for After This Our Exile	Vacant Awards suspended
