= Dennis Yu =

Hong Kong film director

Dennis Yu Yun-kong (余允抗) is a Hong Kong film director active in the 1980s, and a crucial member of Hong Kong New Wave. He is most famous for directing horror movies.

== Filmography ==
=== Film ===
- 1980 The Beasts - Director
- 1980 Shi ba - Director
- 1981 The Imp - Director
- 1984 Crazy Kung Fu Master - Director
- 1985 The Musical Singer - Director
- 1985 City Hero - Director
- 1987 Evil Cat - Director
- 1990 Sketch of a Psycho - Director
