= Hong Kong International Film Festival =

Film festival

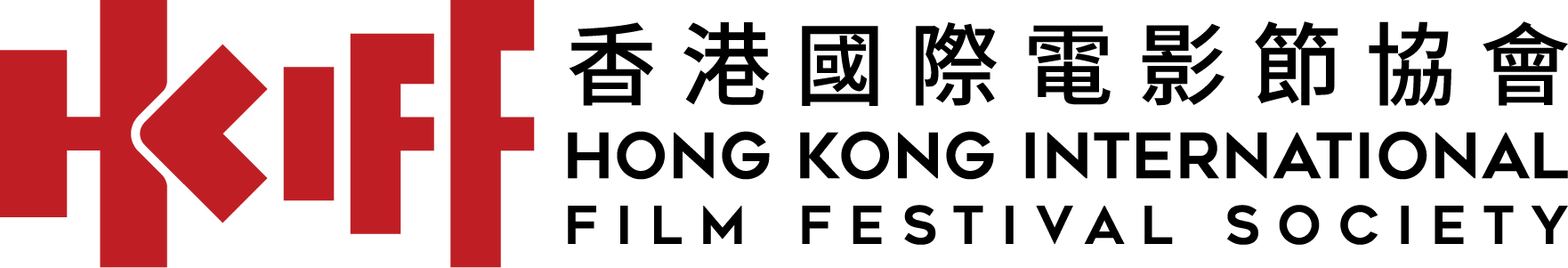
- Location: Hong Kong
- Founded: 1976; 50 years ago
- Most recent: 2025
- Hosted by: HKIFF Society
- Festival date: 10 April to 21 April 2025
- Language: Multi-language (adapted movies from different countries)
- Website: HKIFF

Current: 50th Hong Kong International Film Festival
- 51st 49th

Hong Kong International Film Festival
- Traditional Chinese: 香港國際電影節
- Simplified Chinese: 香港国际电影节
Transcriptions
Standard Mandarin
- Hanyu Pinyin: Xiānggǎng Guójì Diànyǐngjié
Yue: Cantonese
- Yale Romanization: Hēung góng gwok jái dihn yíng jit
- Jyutping: Hoeng1 gong2 gwok3 zai3 din6 jing2 zit3

The Hong Kong International Film Festival (HKIFF) is one of Asia's oldest international film festivals. Founded in 1976, the festival features different movies and filmmakers from different countries, and takes place in Hong Kong.

HKIFF screens around 230 films from more than 60 countries in different major cultural venues across the territory every year. New films are featured as gala premieres, with the directors and cast presenting on the red carpet and meet-and-greet sessions in theatres.

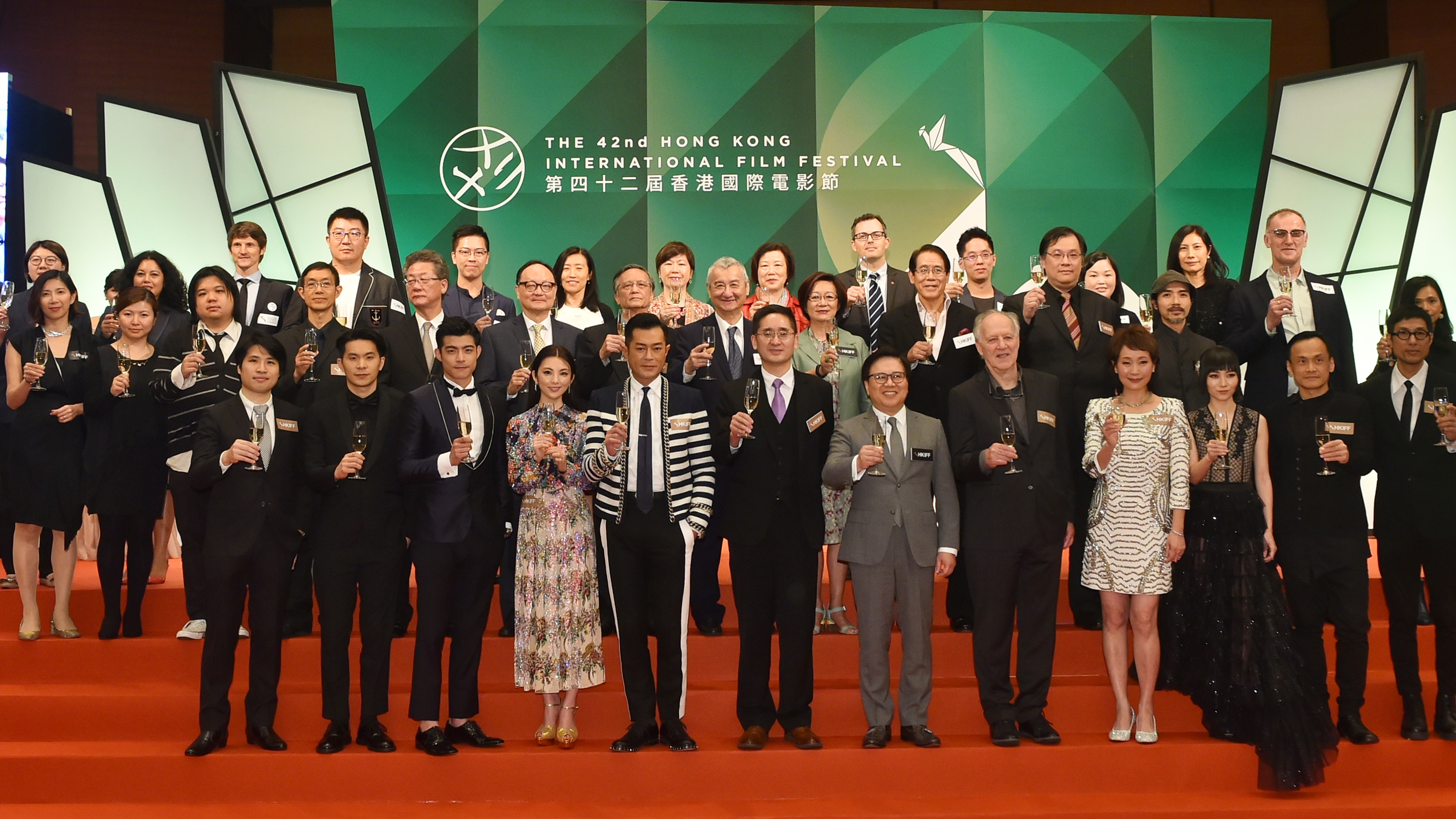
The 42nd Hong Kong International Film Festival Grand Opening

== History ==
Previously operated by Urban Council and Leisure and Cultural Services Department, from 1977 to 2001, and Hong Kong Arts Development Council, from 2002 to 2004, HKIFF was officially incorporated as an independent, charitable organisation – Hong Kong International Film Festival Society Limited after completing its 28th edition. The Hong Kong SAR Government has continued to subsidise the festival through venue provision and partial funding.

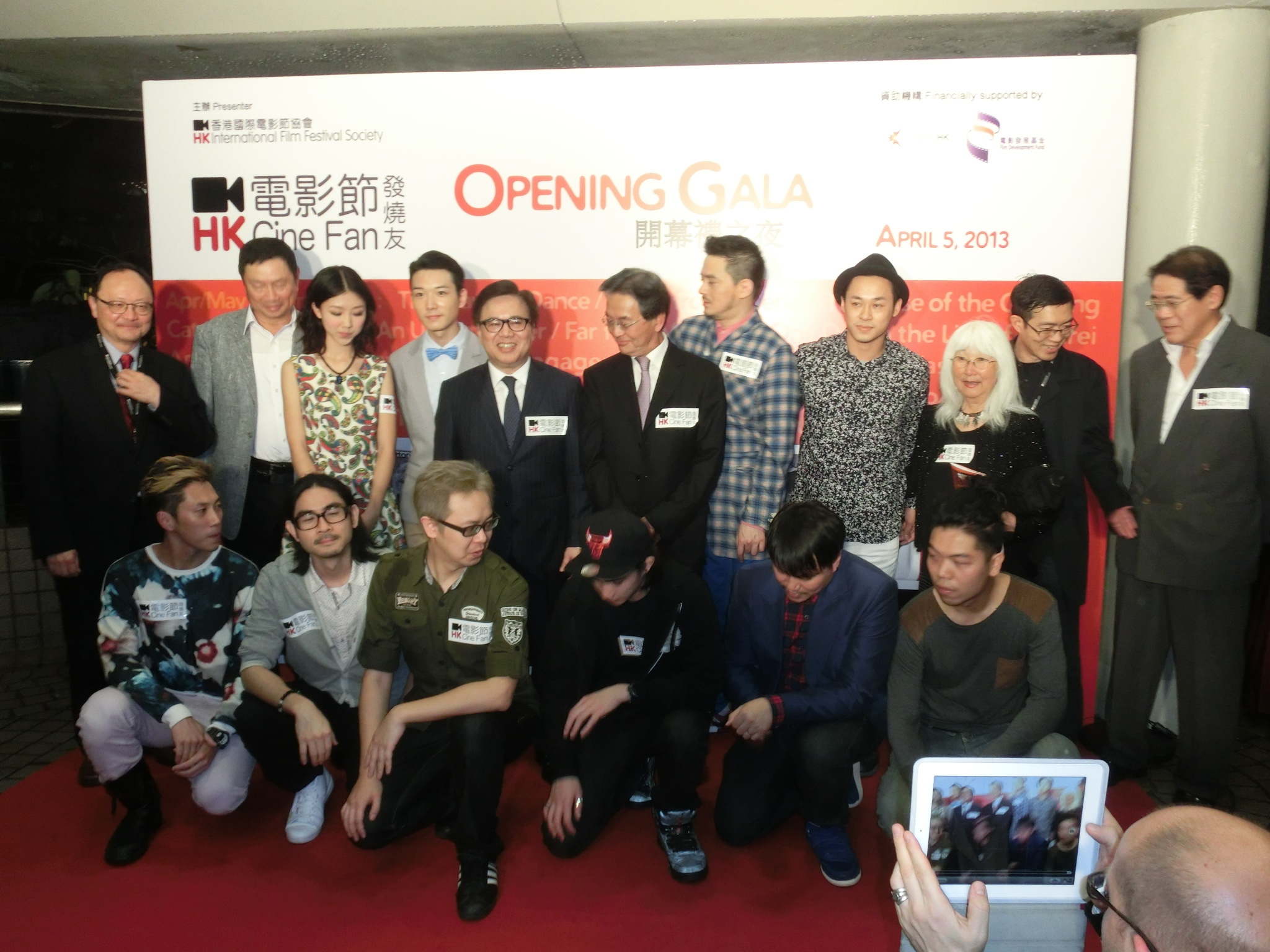
Hong Kong International Film Festival Society Limited

Since 2012, HKIFF produced and premiered anthologies of short films made by well-known award-winning filmmakers from Asia, such as Ann Hui, Kiyoshi Kurosawa, Jia Zhangke, Brillante Mendoza, Hideo Nakata, Tsai Ming-liang, and Apichatpong Weerasethakul. Since 2017, HKIFF started to collaborate with Heyi Pictures to produce two feature films a year by young Chinese filmmakers that will hold their world premieres at HKIFF.

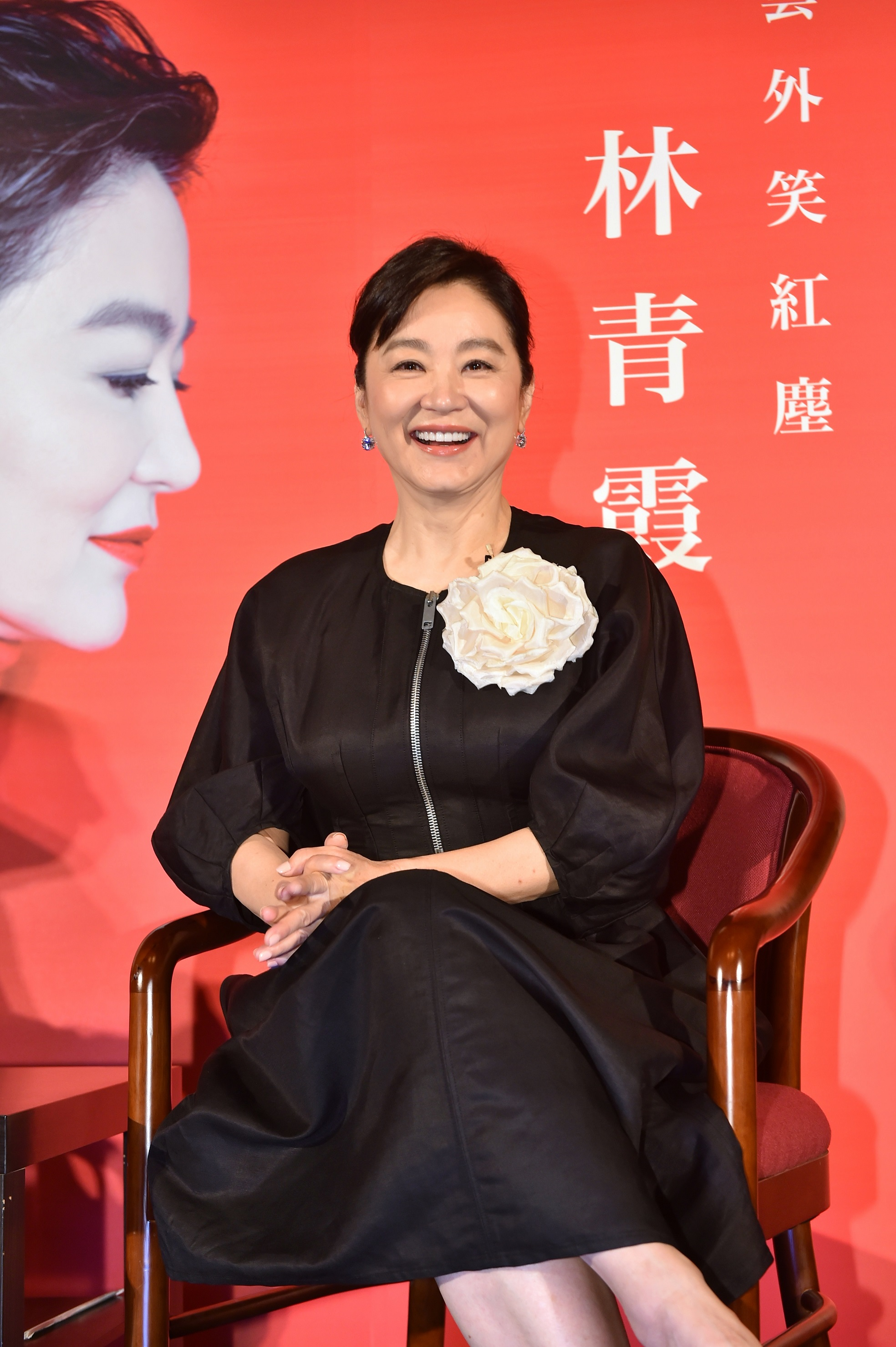
Filmmaker in Focus: Brigitte Lin Ching-Hsia

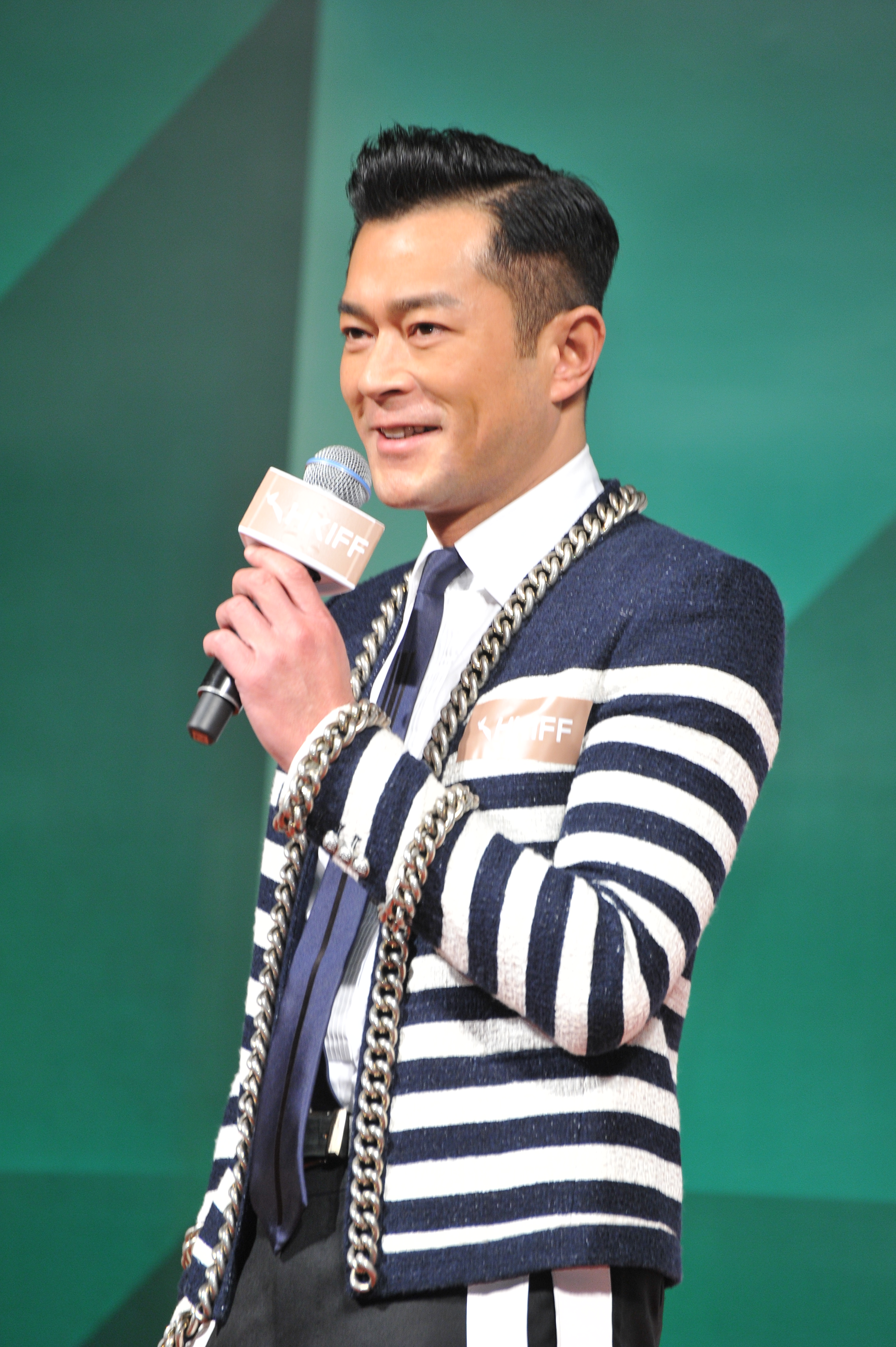
The 42nd Hong Kong International Film Festival Ambassador: Louis Koo Tin-lok

== Past events ==
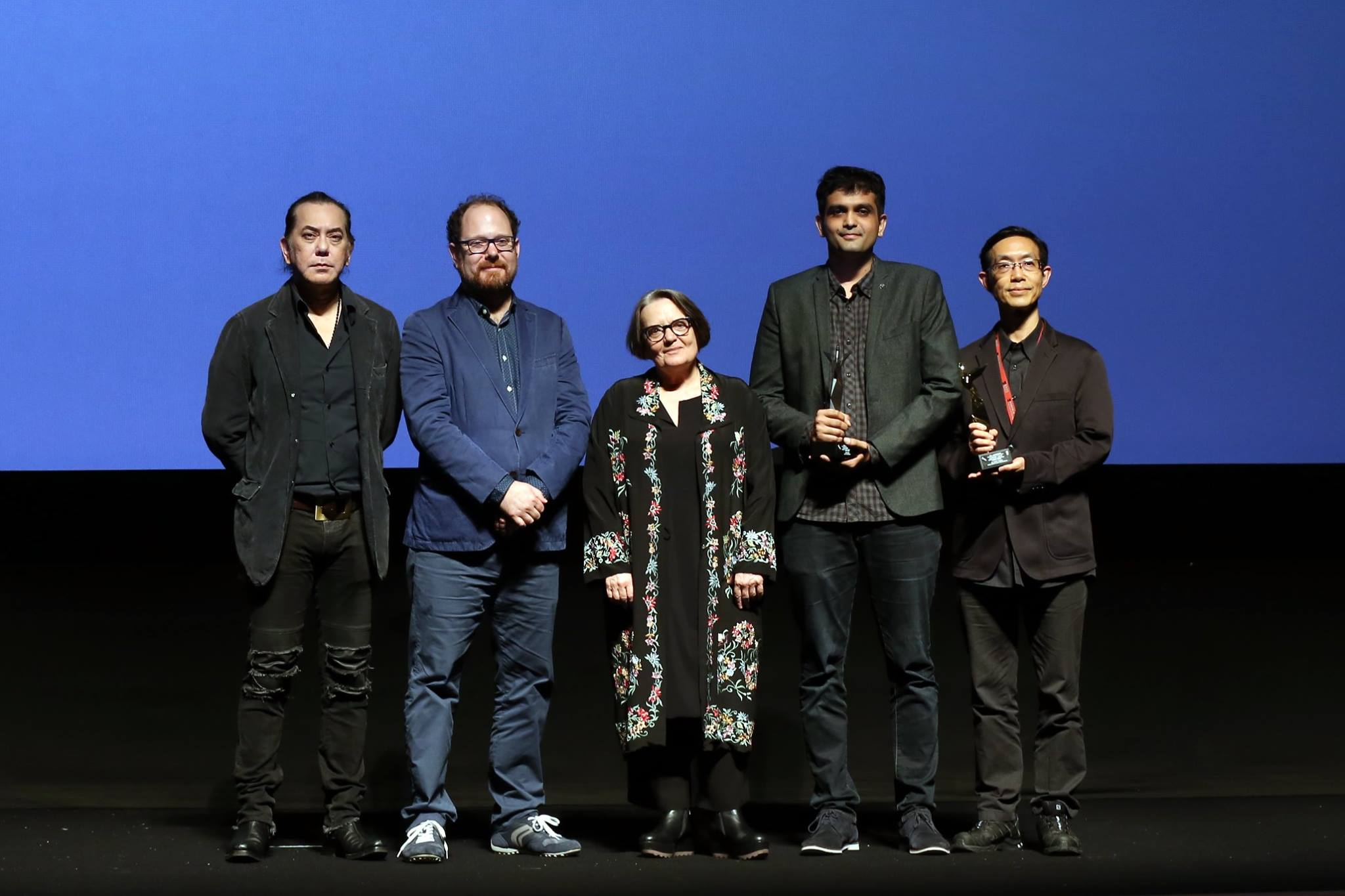
Young Cinema Competition jury (from left to right: Anthony WONG, Colin GEDDES, and Agnieszka HOLLAND), director Amit V Masurkar, and Li Cheuk-to, artistic director of the Hong Kong International Film Festival.

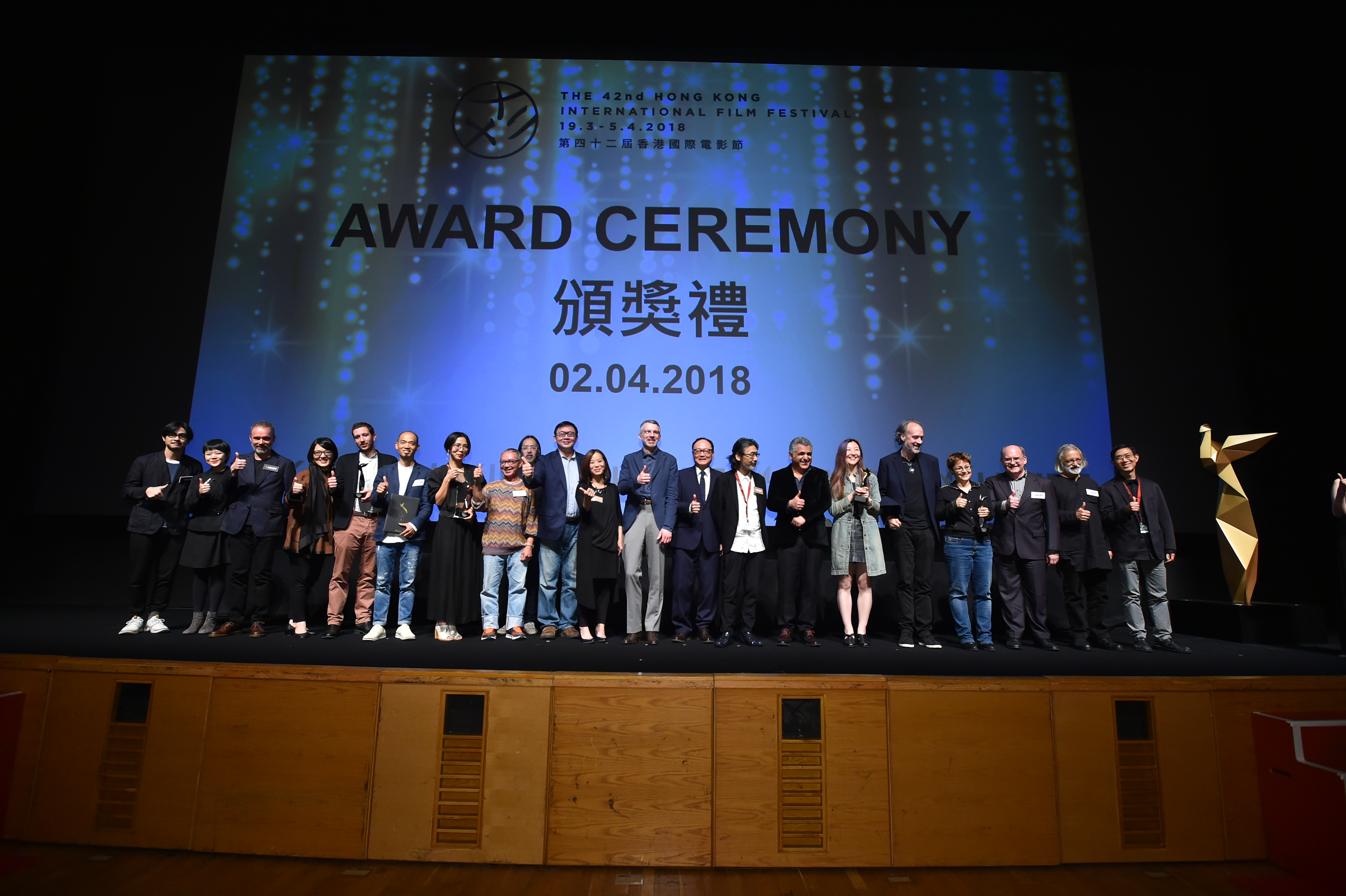
The 42nd Hong Kong International Film Festival Award Ceremony

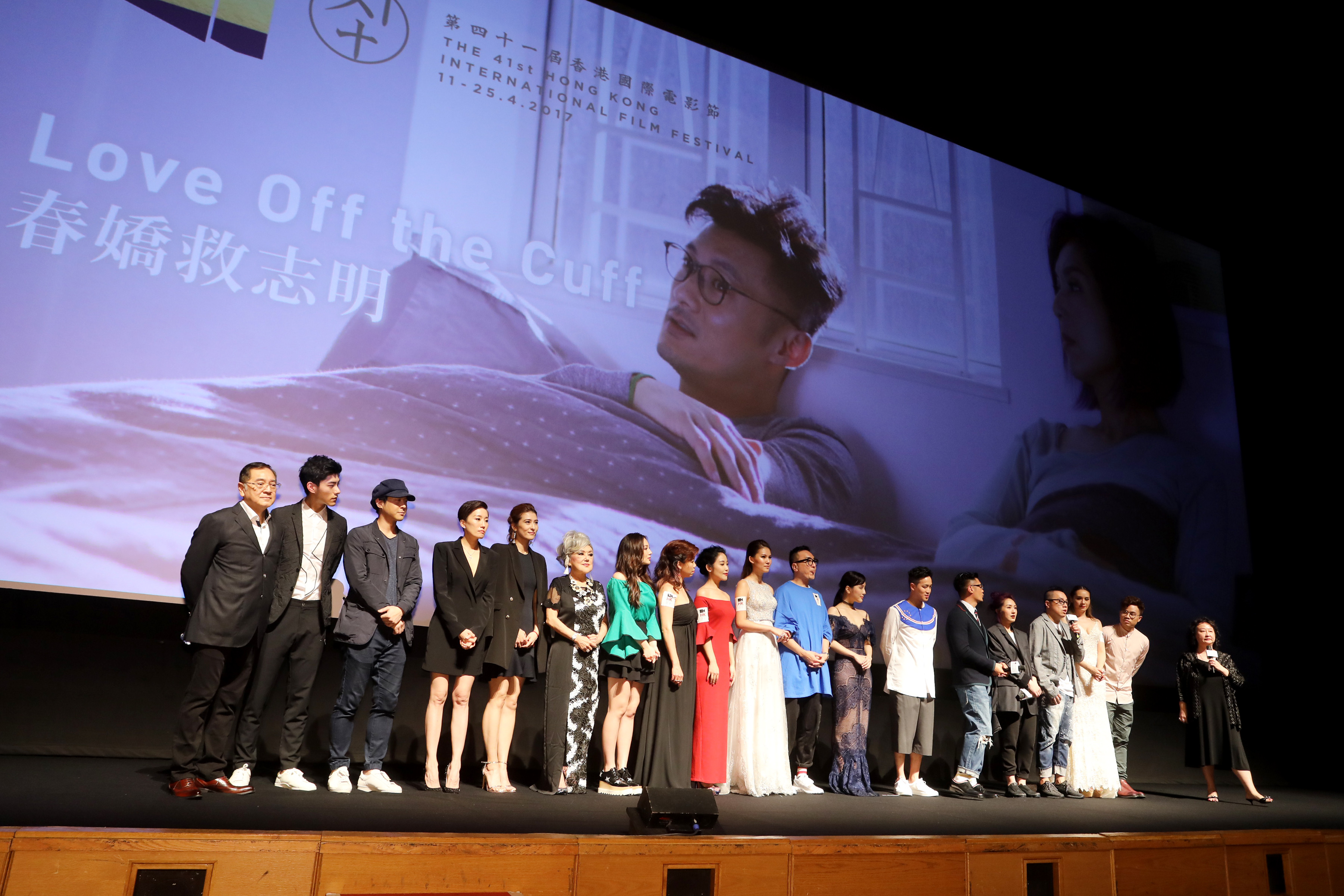
HKIFF 41 Opening Film Love Off the Cuff

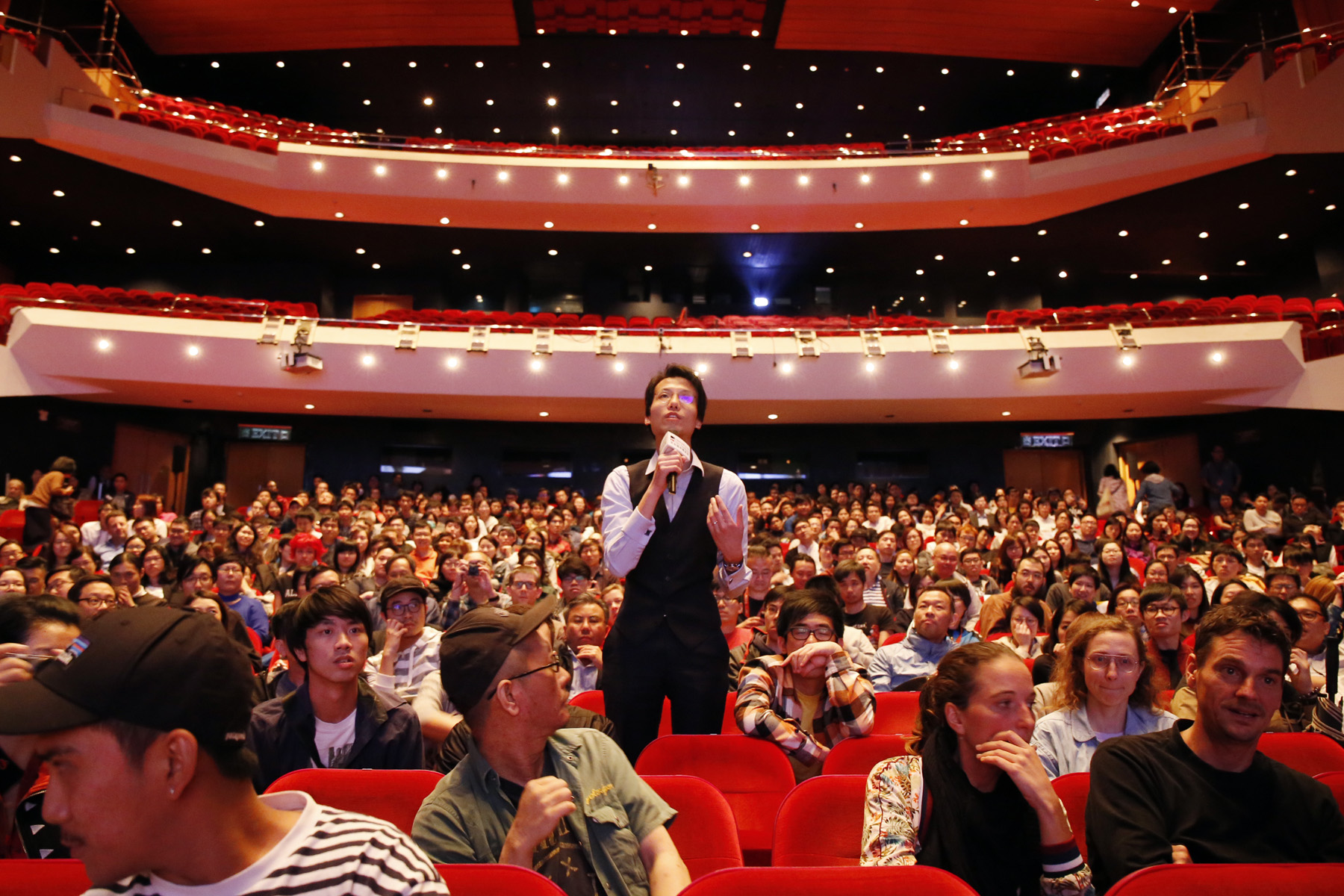
Hong Kong Cultural Centre

Event name	Date	Opening film(s)	Closing film(s)	Filmmaker(s) in Focus	Master Class(es)	Ambassador
HKIFF1	27 June - 10 July 1977	Italy: Year One (dir. Roberto Rossellini)	A Touch of Zen (dir. King Hu)	-	-	-
HKIFF2	26 June - 9 July 1978	Raise Ravens (Cría Cuervos, dir. Carlos Saura) The Seagull (Il Gabbiano, dir. Marco Bellocchio)	-	-	-	-
HKIFF3	25 June - 8 July 1979	Raining in the Mountain (dir. King Hu)	-	-	-	-
HKIFF4	3 - 18 April 1980	American Gigolo (dir. Paul Schrader)	-	-	-	-
HKIFF5	9 - 24 April 1981	Child of the Sun (dir. Kiriro Urayama) The Uprising (dir. Peter Lilienthal)	-	-	-	-
HKIFF6	1-16 April 1982	Circle of Deceit (dir. Volkor Schlondorff) Street Music (dir. Jenny Bowen) Muddy River (dir. Kohei Oguri)	-	-	-	-
HKIFF7	24 March - 8 April 1983	Passion (dir. Jean-Luc Godard) Moonlighting (dir. Jerzy Skolimowski) Son of the North East (dir. Vichit Kounavudhi)	-	-	-	-
HKIFF8	12-27 April 1984	The King of Comedy (dir. Martin Scorsese) Carmen (dir. Carlos Saura) Merry Christmas Mr.Lawrence (dir. Nagisa Oshima)	First Name: Carmen (dir. Jean-Luc Godard)	-	-	-
HKIFF9	29 March - 13 April 1985	Full Moon in Paris (dir. Eric Rohmer) Paris Texas (dir. Wim Wenders) Mac Arthurs Children (dir. Masahiro Shinoda)	Love on the Ground (dir. Jacques Rivette)	-	-	-
HKIFF10	27 March - 11 April 1986	Ping Pong (dir. Leong Po-chih) Ran (dir. Akira Kurosawa) Insignificance (dir. Nicolas Roeg)	The Insomniac on the Bridge (dir. Raúl Ruiz)	-	-	-
HKIFF11	10-25 April 1987	The Green Ray (dir. Eric Rohmer) To Sleep So As To Dream (dir. Kaizo Hayashi) The Sacrifice (dir. Andrei Tarkovsky)	Document: Fanny and Alexander (dir. Ingmar Bergman) The Stand-in (dir. Huang Jianxin)	-	-	-
HKIFF12	31 March - 15 April 1988	Les Affaires Publiques (dir. Robert Bresson) Yeelen (dir. Souleymane Cissé) Goodbye, Children (dir. Louis Malle)	Wings of Desire (dir. Wim Wenders) Red Sorghum (dir. Zhang Yimou)	-	-	-
HKIFF13	23 March - 7 April 1989	Ashik Kerib (dir. Dodo Abashidze and Sergei Parajanov) Women on the Verge of a Nervous Breakdown (dir. Pedro Almodovar) Pellethe Conqueror (dir. Bille August)	Betrayed (dir. Costa-Gavras)	-	-	-
HKIFF14	6 - 21 April 1990	A Terra-Cotta Warrior (dir. Ching Siu-tung)	Song of the Exile (dir. Ann Hui)	Krzysztof Kieślowski Theo Angelopoulos Fumio Kamei Vasily Shukshin	-	-
HKIFF15	28 March - 12 April 1991	Li Lianying: The Imperial Eunuch (dir. Tian Zhuangzhuang)	My American Grandson (dir. Ann Hui)	Aki Kaurismäki Idrissa Ouédraogo	-	-
HKIFF16	10 - 25 April 1992	Ripples Across Stagnant Water (dir. Ling Zifeng) High Heels (dir. Pedro Almodovar)	King of Chess (dirs. Yim Ho, Tsui Hark)	-	-	-
HKIFF17	8 - 23 April 1993	For Fun (dir. Ning Ying) Opening Night (dir. John Cassavetes)	The Wedding Banquet (dir. Ang Lee)	Abbas Kiarostami	-	-
HKIFF18	25 March - 9 April 1994	Three Colours: Blue (dir. Krzysztof Kieślowski)	Three Colours: White (dir. Krzysztof Kieślowski)	Víctor Erice	-	-
HKIFF19	7 - 22 April 1995	In the Heat of the Sun (dir. Jiang Wen) Summer Snow (dir. Ann Hui)	One and a Half (dir. Lawrence Ah Mon) Burnt by the Sun (dir. Nikita Mikhalkov)	Ken Loach	-	-
HKIFF20	25 March - 9 April 1996	Hu Du Men (dir. Shu Kei) From Dusk Till Dawn (dir. Robert Rodriguez)	The King of Masks (dir. Wu Tianming) Mahjong (dir. Edward Yang)	-	-	-
HKIFF21	25 March - 9 April 1997	Kitchen (dir. Yim Ho) The River (dir. Tsai Ming-liang)	The Valiant Ones (dir. King Hu)	Arturo Ripstein	-	-
HKIFF22	3 - 18 April 1998	Beast Cop (dir. Gordon Chan) Dragon Inn (dir. King Hu)	Sweet Degeneration (dir. Lin Cheng-sheng)	Errol Morris Tony Gatlif	-	-
HKIFF23	31 March - 15 April 1999	Ordinary Heroes (dir. Ann Hui) Where a Good Man Goes (dir. Johnnie To)	Mr Zhao (dir. Lü Yue) Crazy English (dir. Zhang Yuan)	Johnnie To Kiyoshi Kurosawa Walter Salles	-	-
HKIFF24	12 - 27 April 2000	Spacked Out (dir. Lawrence Ah Mon) The Million Dollar Hotel (dir. Wim Wenders)	A Chance to Die (dir. Chen Yi-wen) Durian Durian (dir. Fruit Chan)	Otar Iosseliani	-	-
HKIFF25	6 - 21 April 2001	Penoy Pavilion (dir. Yonfan) Mortal Transfer (dir. Jean-Jacques Beineix)	Yi Yi (dir. Edward Yang)	Tony Leung Chiu-wai Jean-Jacques Beineix Darius Khondji	-	-
HKIFF26	27 March - 7 April 2002	Hollywood Hong Kong (dir. Fruit Chan) Heaven (dir. Tom Tykwer)	What Time is it There? (dir. Tsai Ming-liang)	Ann Hui	-	-
HKIFF27	8 - 23 April 2003	The Twilight Samurai (dir. Yoji Yamada) PTU (dir. Johnnie To)	Cala, My Dog! (dir. Lu Xuechang) Adaptation (dir. Spike Jonze)	Jeffrey Lau Dardenne brothers Marco Bellocchio	-	SHINE
HKIFF28	6 - 21 April 2004	Baober in Love (dir. Li Shaohong) Jade Goddess of Mercy (dir. Ann Hui)	Goodbye, Dragon Inn (dir. Tsai Ming-liang) Not on the Lips (dir. Alain Resnais)	William Chang Kim Ki-duk	-	-
HKIFF29	22 March - 6 April 2005	Peacock (dir. Gu Changwei) The Hidden Blade (dir. Yōji Yamada)	The World (dir. Jia Zhangke) Words in Blue (dir. Alain Corneau)	Andy Lau	-	Andy Lau
HKIFF30	4 - 19 April 2006	Election 2 (dir. Johnnie To) Isabella(dir. Pang Ho-cheung)	Snow Cake (dir. Marc Evans) Candy (dir. Neil Armfield)	-	-	Andy Lau
HKIFF31	10 March - 11 April 2007	Eye in the Sky (dir. Yau Nai-Hoi) I am a Cyborg, but that's OK (dir. Park Chan-wook)	-	Herman Yau	-	-
HKIFF32	17 March - 6 April 2008	Kabei - Our Mother (dir. Yoji Yamada) Soul of a Demon (dir. Chang Tso-chi)	Shine a Light (dir. Martin Scorsese) Coffee or Tea (dirs. Shu Kei, Kwan Man-hin)	Eric Tsang	-	Sammi Cheng
HKIFF33	22 March - 13 April 2009	Night and Fog (dir. Ann Hui) Shinjuku Incident (dir. Derek Yee)	24 City (dir. Jia Zhangke)	-	-	Karen Mok
HKIFF34	18 March - 6 April 2010	Crossing Hennessy (dir. Ivy Ho) Like a Dream (dir. Clara Law)	Amphetamine (dir. Scud) Ex (dir. Heiward Mak)	-	-	-
HKIFF35	20 March - 5 April 2011	Don't Go Breaking My Heart (dirs. Johnnie To, Wai Ka-fai) Quattro Hong Kong 2 (dirs. Apichatpong Weerasethakul; Brillante Mendoza; Stanley Kwan; Ho Yuhang)	-	Wai Ka-fai	Jia Zhangke	Miriam Yeung
HKIFF36	21 March - 5 April 2012	Love in the Buff (dir. Pang Ho-cheung)	White Deer Plain (dir. Wang Quan'an)	Peter Chan	Keanu Reeves	Miriam Yeung
HKIFF37	17 March - 2 April 2013	Ip Man - The Final Fight (dir. Herman Yau)	Closed Curtain (dirs. Jafar Panahi, Kambuzia Partovi)	Andrew Lau	Wong Kar-wai	Miriam Yeung
HKIFF38	24 March - 7 April 2014	Aberdeen (dir. Pang Ho-cheung) The Midnight After (dir. Fruit Chan)	That Demon Within (dir. Dante Lam)	-	-	Louis Koo
HKIFF39	23 March - 6 April 2015	Murmur of the Hearts (dir. Sylvia Chang)	Port of Call (dir. Philip Yung)	Sylvia Chang	Peter Greenaway Mohsen Makhmalbaf Pedro Costa	Louis Koo
HKIFF40	21 March - 4 April 2016	Chongqing Hot Pot (dir. Yang Qing) Trivisa (dirs. Frank Hui, Jevons Au, Vicky Wong)	Creepy (dir. Kiyoshi Kurosawa)	-	Béla Tarr	Louis Koo
HKIFF41	11 - 25 April 2017	Love Off the Cuff (dir. Pang Ho-cheung)	mon mon mon MONSTERS (dir. Giddens Ko)	-	Olivier Assayas Agnieszka Holland Ildikó Enyedi	Louis Koo
HKIFF42	19 March - 5 April 2018	Omotenashi (dir. Jay Chern) Xiao Mei (dir. Maren Hwang)	What a Wonderful Family! 3: My Wife, My Life (dir. Yamada Yoji)	Brigitte Lin	Werner Herzog Tsai Ming-liang Kazuo Hara	Louis Koo
HKIFF43	18 March - 1 April 2019	Bodies at Rest (dir. Renny Harlin)	By the Grace of God (dir. François Ozon)	Sammo Hung	Lee Chang-dong Asghar Farhadi Jiang Wen	Aaron Kwok
HKIFF44	Cancelled (Note: HKIFF44 was cancelled due to the Covid-19 pandemic. When the cinemas finally reopened, HKIFF Society decided to bring the cancelled programme to local residents through a five week-long CineFest (September 30 - November 5).)	Keep Rolling (dir. Man Lim-chung) Little Big Women (dir. Joseph Hsu)	The Cornered Mouse Dreams of Cheese (dir. Isao Yukisada)	Michael Hui	-	Aaron Kwok
HKIFF45	1 April - 12 April 2021	Septet: The Story of Hong Kong (dir. Ann Hui, Sammo Hung, Ringo Lam, Patrick Tam, Johnnie To, Tsui Hark, and Yuen Woo-ping) Where the Wind Blows (dir. Philip Yung), later cancelled	Wheel of Fortune and Fantasy (dir. Ryusuke Hamaguchi)	Stanley Kwan	Frederick Wiseman Kazuo Hara (Note: Due to Covid-19-related travel restrictions, all the master classes were held online.)	Aaron Kwok
HKIFF46	15 August - 31 August 2022 (Note: Following the government's announcement extending its social distancing measures to curb the escalating Covid-19 pandemic, HKIFF46 scheduled initially between 31 March and 11 April was postponed.)	Where the Wind Blows (dir. Philip Yung) Warriors of Future (dir. Ng Yuen-fai)	Tori and Lokita (dirs. Jean-Pierre and Luc Dardenne)	Sandra Ng	Dardenne brothers Chung Mong-hong	Aaron Kwok
HKIFF47	30 March - 10 April 2023	Mad Fate (dir. Soi Cheang) Elegies (dir. Ann Hui)	Vital Sign (dir. Cheuk Wan-chi)	Soi Cheang	Tsai Ming-liang	Aaron Kwok
HKIFF48	28 March - 8 April 2024	All Shall Be Well (dir. Ray Yeung)	All the Long Nights (dir. Sho Miyake)	Fruit Chan	Víctor Erice Martin McDonagh	Karena Lam
HKIFF49	10 April - 21 April 2025	The Brightest Sun (dir. Tetsuya Nakashima) Pavane for an Infant (dir. Chong Keat Aun)	Dreams (Sex Love) (dir. Dag Johan Haugerud)	Louis Koo	Albert Serra Wang Bing	Angela Yuen
HKIFF50	1 April - 12 April 2026	We Are All Strangers (dir. Anthony Chen)	Cyclone (dir. Philip Yung)	Jia Zhangke	Chen Kaige Tian Zhuangzhuang Huang Jianxin Ildikó Enyedi Juliette Binoche	Angela Yuen Tony Wu

== Competition ==
HKIFF Firebird Awards include three categories: Young Cinema Competition, Documentary Competition and Short Film Competition. The results are decided by three jury teams consisting of film industry professionals such as film critics, directors and film festival delegates. Besides Firebird Awards, HKIFF also established FIPRESCI Prize in HKIFF23 to recognize enterprising filmmakers and promotes young talent in Asian cinema. Starting from HKIFF41, Audience Choice Award is held during the film festival when the audience members who purchased tickets and festival passes could vote for their favorite films. From HKIFF43, the Young Cinema Competition was divided into "Chinese Language" and "World" sections.

Event name	Young Cinema Competition	Documentary Competition	Short Film Competition	FIPRESCI Prize	Audience Choice Award
HKIFF36	Firebird Award: Song of Silence Jury Prize: The End of Puberty	Firebird Award: Jai Bhim Comrade Jury Prize: Back to the Square	Firebird Award: Muybridge's Strings Jury Prize: Everyone Says I Love You Special Mention: ORA	The Mirror Never Lies	-
HKIFF37	Firebird Award: In Bloom Jury Prize: All Apologies Special Mention: Longing for the Rain	Firebird Award: Roots Jury Prize: Oh, the San Xia Special Mention: Redemption Impossible	Firebird Award: Night Shift Jury Prize: Room 606	In Bloom	-
HKIFF38	Firebird Award: Macondo Jury Prize: The Tale of Iya Special Mention: Forma	Firebird Award: My Name Is Salt Jury Prize: The Last Moose of Aoluguya Special Mention: Meat and Milk	Firebird Award: Butter Lamp Jury Prize: Cold Snap Special Mention: Symphony no.42	10 Minutes	-
HKIFF39	Firebird Award: Sworn Virgin Jury Prize: K Special Mention: The Coffin in the Mountain	Firebird Award: I am the People Jury Prize: A Young Patriot	Firebird Award: Listen Jury Prize: A Blue Room	K	-
HKIFF40	Firebird Award: Life After Life Jury Prize: Tomcat	Firebird Award: Behemoth Jury Prize: Under The Sun	Firebird Award: Batrachian's Ballad Jury Prize: Prelude to the General	The Island Funeral	-
HKIFF41	Firebird Award: My Happy Family Jury Prize: Newton	Firebird Award: House in the Fields Jury Prize: Inmates	Firebird Award: Jukai Jury Prize: Ten Mornings Ten Evenings And One Horizon Special Mention: Everything	Happy Bus Day	Mad World
HKIFF42	Firebird Award: Girls Always Happy Jury Prize: Daughter of Mine	Firebird Award: Of Love & Law Jury Prize: The Distant Barking of Dogs Special Mention: Mama	Firebird Award: Wicked Girl Jury Prize: The Burden	Girls Always Happy	An Elephant Sitting Still
HKIFF43	Firebird Award (Chinese Language): A First Farewell Firebird Award (World): You Have the Night	Firebird Award: Midnight Family Jury Prize: Advocate	Firebird Award: All These Creatures Jury Prize: The Call	The Golden-Laden Sheep and the Sacred Mountain	-
HKIFF44	Firebird Award (Chinese Language): The Cloud in Her Room Firebird Award (World): This Is Not a Burial, It's a Resurrection	Firebird Award: The Painter and the Thief Jury Prize: Once You Know	Firebird Award: Genius Loci Jury Prize: Heading South	This Is Not a Burial, It's a Resurrection	-
HKIFF45	Firebird Award (Chinese Language): The Day is Over Firebird Award (World): The Wasteland	Firebird Award: Mr Bachmann and His Class Jury Prize: Sabaya	Firebird Award: Motorcyclist's Happiness Won't Fit Into His Suit Jury Prize: Vadim on a Walk Special Mention: Blessed Winter	The Story of Southern Islet	-
HKIFF46	Firebird Award (Chinese Language): A New Old Play Firebird Award (World): Mediterranean Fever	Firebird Award: All That Breathes Jury Prize: Children of the Mist	Firebird Award: Bestia Jury Prize: The Bones Special Mention: Sideral	A New Old Play	-
HKIFF47	Firebird Award (Chinese Language): Stonewalling Firebird Award (World): Tótem	Firebird Award: Apolonia, Apolonia Jury Prize: The Hamlet Syndrome	Firebird Award: Bear Jury Prize: Smoke Gets in Your Eyes	Stonewalling	-
HKIFF48	Firebird Award (Chinese Language): Snow in Midsummer Firebird Award (World): Sons	Firebird Award: Favoriten Jury Prize: Obedience	Firebird Award: The Meatseller Jury Prize: Shrooms	A Journey in Spring	Love Lies
HKIFF49	Firebird Award (Chinese Language): To Kill a Mongolian Horse Firebird Award (World): Black Ox	Firebird Award: Yalla Parkour Jury Prize: Riefenstahl	Firebird Award: Their Eyes Jury Prize: Anba Dlo	The Botanist	The Red Envelope
HKIFF50	Firebird Award (Chinese Language): Linka Linka Firebird Award (World): Rose	Firebird Award: Past Future Continuous Jury Prize: The Ground Beneath Our Feet	Firebird Award: God is Shy Jury Prize: Robert and June (and all the time in the world)	Linka Linka	We're Nothing At All

== Controversy ==
The Longest Summer

At the 48th Hong Kong International Film Festival, The Longest Summer, a film by director Fruit Chan, which touches on the topic of the handover of Hong Kong to the People's Republic of China in July 1997, was originally scheduled to be screened on 2 February 2024. However, the screening was abruptly cancelled after the organizer said they were unable to locate suitable copies for screening.

== See also ==
- List of film festivals
- List of film festivals in China
