= 47th Hong Kong International Film Festival =

Film festival in Hong Kong

- HKIFF official poster
- Opening film: Mad Fate by Soi Cheang; Elegies by Ann Hui
- Closing film: Vital Signs by Cheuk Wan-chi
- Location: Hong Kong Cultural Centre
- Founded: 1977
- Awards: Firebird (Chinese-language): Stonewalling by Huang Ji & Ryuji Otsuka; Firebird (World): Tótem by Lila Avilés; Firebird (Documentary): Apolonia, Apolonia by Lea Glob
- Hosted by: Supported by: The Hong Kong International Film Festival Society; Create Hong Kong
- Festival date: Opening: March 30, 2023; Closing: April 10, 2023
- Website: HKIFF 2023

Hong Kong International Film Festival
- 48th 46th

The 47th Hong Kong International Film Festival (Chinese: 第47屆香港國際電影節) took place from 30 March to 10 April 2023, both online and in-person in Hong Kong. Soi Cheang was selected as the Filmmaker in Focus for this edition and masterclasses led by Tsai Ming-liang and Lee Kang-sheng were featured.

The festival opened with the Hong Kong mystery thriller Mad Fate by Soi Cheang and the documentary Elegies by Ann Hui, and it closed with the Hong Kong drama Vital Signs by Cheuk Wan-chi. This year, 197 films from 64 countries were screened, including nine world premieres, six international premieres, and sixty-seven Asian premieres. Aaron Kwok returned as the ambassador of HKIFF, marking his fifth year in this role.

== Background ==
The 47th Hong Kong International Film Festival was the first edition to return to normalcy following the COVID-19 pandemic. The theme of this edition is "Never Stops". The festival poster was designed by Frank Chan, who also created the posters for the previous two editions. It features little egrets, making it the third edition to use a Hong Kong bird in the design (following the barn swallow in the 45th and the tree sparrow in the 46th), which symbolizes a pursuit of beauty and nature, as well as a sign of fortune. On 1 February 2023, Aaron Kwok was announced to return as the ambassador of the Hong Kong International Film Festival, marking his fifth year in this role. Kwok described 2022 as "a year of harvest", with many Hong Kong films achieving both box office success and critical acclaim, and expressed a hope that the film industry could help society emerge from the COVID-19 pandemic. This year was Kwok's final term as ambassador, with his title being succeeded by Karena Lam in the next edition.

Soi Cheang was announced as the Filmmaker in Focus for the festival on 3 February. Albert Lee, the executive director of the Hong Kong International Film Festival Society, explained that Cheang was chosen for his notably somber yet unmistakably personal visual style, which rarely deviates from mainstream storytelling conventions while exploring new boundaries in Hong Kong genre filmmaking. Taiwanese director Tsai Ming-liang and his frequent collaborator Lee Kang-sheng were also announced as features in the Masterclass section and would be attending the festival in person. A press conference held on 10 March revealed the full lineup and the titles of the competitive sections.

The film festival opened on 30 March 2023 at the Hong Kong Cultural Centre with Soi Cheang's mystery thriller Mad Fate and Ann Hui's documentary Elegies. The festival was held both physically and online, with physical screenings priced at around $55 to $100 HKD, while online screenings were set at $50 HKD. A total of 197 films from 64 countries were screened, including nine world premieres, six international premieres, and sixty-seven Asian premieres. The film festival was part of the Entertainment Expo Hong Kong, which featured events such as the 16th Asian Film Awards and the 41st Hong Kong Film Awards taking place concurrently.

The Japanese drama Stonewalling by Huang Ji and Ryuji Otsuka won the Firebird Award for the Young Cinema Competition (Chinese-language), while the Mexican-Danish-French drama Tótem by Lila Avilés won the Firebird Award for the Young Cinema Competition (World). The Danish-Polish documentary Apolonia, Apolonia by Lea Glob received the Firebird Award for Documentary Competition. The FIPRESCI Prize was also awarded to Stonewalling, while the Taiwanese film Bad Education by Kai Ko received a Special Mention. The festival closed with the Hong Kong medical drama Vital Signs by Cheuk Wan-chi on 10 April.

== Jury ==
The jury of the Firebird Awards comprises:

=== Young Cinema Competition (Chinese-language) ===
- Hsu Hsiao-ming, Taiwanese filmmaker
- Zhang Lü, Chinese filmmaker
- Mary Stephen, a French-based Hong Kong film editor

=== Young Cinema Competition (World) ===
- Ann Hui, Hong Kong filmmaker
- Emmanuel Burdeau, French film critic
- Clarence Tsui, Hong Kong film critic

=== Documentary Competition ===
- Malcolm Clarke, Chinese-based English filmmaker
- Uli Gaulke, German documentary filmmaker
- Qiu Jiongjiong, Chinese filmmaker

== Program sections ==
=== Opening and closing films ===
The following films were chosen as the opening and closing features of the film festival, marking the Asian premiere of Mad Fate and world premieres of Elegies and Vital Signs:

English title	Original title	Director(s)	Production countrie(s)
Opening film
Mad Fate	命案	Soi Cheang	Hong Kong
Elegies	詩	Ann Hui	Hong Kong
Closing film
Vital Signs	送院途中	Cheuk Wan-chi	Hong Kong

=== Gala Presentation ===
The following films have been selected for screening in the Gala Presentation section:

English title	Original title	Director(s)	Production countrie(s)
Afire	Roter Himmel	Christian Petzold	Germany
Aftersun	—N/a	Charlotte Wells	United Kingdom, United States
All the Beauty and the Bloodshed	—N/a	Laura Poitras	United States

=== Cinephile Paradise ===
The following films have been selected for screening in the Cinephile Paradise section:

English title	Original title	Director(s)	Production countrie(s)
The Beasts	As bestas	Rodrigo Sorogoyen	Spain, France
Corsage	—N/a	Marie Kreutzer	Austria, Luxembourg, Germany, France
The Eight Mountains	Le otto montagne	Felix van Groeningen, Charlotte Vandermeersch	Italy, Belgium, France
Plan 75	—N/a	Chie Hayakawa	Japan, France, Philippines
Saint Omer	—N/a	Alice Diop	France
Stars at Noon	—N/a	Claire Denis	France
Subtraction	تفریق	Mani Haghighi	Iran
World War III	جنگ جهانی سوم	Houman Seyyedi	Iran

=== Firebird Awards ===
==== Young Cinema Competition (Chinese-language) ====
The following films were selected to compete in the Young Cinema Competition (Chinese-language) at the Firebird Awards. Stonewalling emerged as the winner, with Huang Xiaoxiong also named Best Actress for her performance in the film. Hong Heng-fai was named Best Director for Kissing the Ground You Walked On, and Li Xuejian received the Best Actor award for To Love Again. Bad Education was given a Special Mention.

English title	Original title	Director(s)	Production countrie(s)
Absence	雪雲	Wu Lang	China
Bad Education	黑的教育	Kai Ko	Taiwan
Coo-Coo 043	一家子兒咕咕叫	Chan Ching-lin	Taiwan
Kissing the Ground You Walked On	海鷗來過的房間	Hong Heng-fai	Macau
Night Falls	夜幕將至	Jian Haodong	China
Stonewalling	石門	Huang Ji, Ryuji Otsuka	Japan
To Love Again	再團圓	Gao Linyang	China
Tomorrow Is a Long Time	明天比昨天長久	Jow Zhi Wei	Singapore, Taiwan, France, Portugal

==== Young Cinema Competition (World) ====
The following films were selected to compete in the Young Cinema Competition (World) at the Firebird Awards. Tótem emerged as the winner, with Martín Benchimol awarded Best Director for his debut The Castle. Mirko Giannini was named Best Actor for his role in Astrakan, while the ensemble female cast received the Best Actress award for 20,000 Species of Bees.

English title	Original title	Director(s)	Production countrie(s)
20,000 Species of Bees	20.000 especies de abejas	Estibaliz Urresola Solaguren	Spain
Animalia	—N/a	Sofia Alaoui	France, Morocco, Qatar
Astrakan	—N/a	David Depesseville	France
Autobiography	—N/a	Makbul Mubarak	Indonesia, France, Singapore, Poland
The Cage Is Looking for a Bird	Kletka ishet ptitsu	Malika Musaeva	France, Russia
The Castle	El castillo	Martín Benchimol	Argentina, France
Disco Boy	—N/a	Giacomo Abbruzzese	France, Italy, Belgium, Poland
Tótem	ماء العين	Lila Avilés	Mexico, Denmark, France

==== Documentary Competition ====
The following films were selected to compete in the Young Cinema Competition (Documentary) at the Firebird Awards. Apolonia, Apolonia emerged as the winner, while The Hamlet Syndrome received the jury prize.

English title	Original title	Director(s)	Production countrie(s)
Apolonia, Apolonia	—N/a	Lea Glob	Denmark, Poland
The Echo	El eco	Tatiana Huezo	Mexico, Germany
Fledglings	Pisklaki	Lidia Duda	Poland
The Hamlet Syndrome	—N/a	Elwira Niewiera, Piotr Rosołowski	Poland, Germany
A Holy Family	神人之家	Elvis Lu	Taiwan
Paradise	Paradis	Alexander Abaturov	France, Switzerland
Smoke Sauna Sisterhood	Savvusanna sõsarad	Anna Hints	Estonia, France, Iceland
A Still Small Voice	—N/a	Luke Lorentzen	United States

=== Pan-Chinese Cinema ===
==== Filmmaker in Focus ====
Soi Cheang was announced as the Filmmaker in Focus for the film festival on 3 February 2023, showcasing twelve of his previous works:

English title	Original title	Director(s)	Year of release	Production countrie(s)
Our Last Day	第100日	Soi Cheang	1999	Hong Kong
Diamond Hill	發光石頭	Soi Cheang	2000	Hong Kong
Horror Hotline... Big Head Monster	恐怖熱線之大頭怪嬰	Soi Cheang	2001	Hong Kong
New Blood	熱血青年	Soi Cheang	2002	Hong Kong
Love Battlefield	愛·作戰	Soi Cheang	2004	Hong Kong
Home Sweet Home	怪物	Soi Cheang	2005	Hong Kong
Dog Bite Dog	狗咬狗	Soi Cheang	2006	Hong Kong
Shamo	軍雞	Soi Cheang	2007	Hong Kong
Accident	意外	Soi Cheang	2009	Hong Kong
Motorway	車手	Soi Cheang	2012	Hong Kong
SPL II: A Time for Consequences	殺破狼2	Soi Cheang	2015	Hong Kong
Limbo	智齒	Soi Cheang	2021	Hong Kong

==== Chinese-language Restored Classics ====
Four restored Chinese classics were showcased as part of a sidebar at the film festival:

English title	Original title	Director(s)	Year of release	Production countrie(s)
Nomad (Director's cut)	烈火青春	Patrick Tam	1982	Hong Kong
A City of Sadness	悲情城市	Hou Hsiao-hsien	1989	Taiwan
Dust of Angels	少年吔，安啦！	Hsu Hsiao-ming	1992	Taiwan
A Confucian Confusion	獨立時代	Edward Yang	1994	Taiwan

=== Masters and Auteurs ===
==== The Masters ====
The following films were selected for screening in the Masterclass section, including two works by Tsai Ming-Liang, who attended the festival in person to host a masterclass:

English title	Original title	Director(s)	Production countrie(s)
A Couple	Un couple	Frederick Wiseman	France, United States
Fairytale	Сказка	Alexander Sokurov	Russia, Belgium
The Fire Within: A Requiem for Katia and Maurice Krafft	—N/a	Werner Herzog	France, United Kingdom, Switzerland
Theater of Thought	—N/a	Werner Herzog	United States
Ingeborg Bachmann – Journey into the Desert	—N/a	Margarethe von Trotta	Switzerland, Germany, Luxembourg, Austria
In Water	물안에서	Hong Sang-soo	South Korea
R.M.N.	—N/a	Cristian Mungiu	Romania, France, Belgium
Sparta	—N/a	Ulrich Seidl	Austria, France, Germany
Where	何處	Tsai Ming-liang	Taiwan
Where do you stand, Tsai Ming-Liang?	身在何處	Tsai Ming-liang	Taiwan

==== Les Auteurs ====
The following films have been selected for screening in the Les Auteurs section:

English title	Original title	Director(s)	Production countrie(s)
Assault	Shturm	Adilkhan Yerzhanov	Kazakhstan, Russia
Drift	—N/a	Anthony Chen	France, Greece, United Kingdom
Eastern Front	Shidniy front	Vitaly Mansky, Yevhen Titarenko	Latvia, Czech Republic, Ukraine, United States
Flotsam and Jetsam	夏日天空的那匹紅馬	Chang Tso-chi	Taiwan
Here	—N/a	Bas Devos	Belgium
The Hotel	—N/a	Wang Xiaoshuai	China, Thailand
The Natural History of Destruction	—N/a	Sergei Loznitsa	Germany, Lithuania, The Netherlands
Music	—N/a	Angela Schanelec	Germany, France, Serbia
Our Body	Notre Corps	Claire Simon	France
The Shadowless Tower	白塔之光	Zhang Lü	China
Tchaikovsky's Wife	Жена Чайковского	Kirill Serebrennikov	Russia, France, Switzerland

=== Global Vision ===
The following films have been selected for screening in the Global Vision section:

English title	Original title	Director(s)	Production countrie(s)
The Blue Caftan	أزرق القفطان	Maryam Touzani	France, Morocco, Belgium, Denmark
Burning Days	Kurak Günler	Emin Alper	Turkey, France
The Dam	Le barrage	Ali Cherri	France, Sudan, Lebano, Germany, Serbia
Domingo and the Mist	Domingo y la niebla	Ariel Escalante Meza	Costa Rica
Falcon Lake	—N/a	Charlotte Le Bon	Canada, France
The Happiest Man in the World	NajsreЌniot čovek na svetot	Teona Strugar Mitevska	North Macedonia, Belgium, Slovenia, Denmark
I Have Electric Dreams	Tengo sueños eléctricos	Valentina Maurel	Costa Rica, Belgium, France
Life	Жизнь	Emir Baigazin	Kazakhstan
Metronom	—N/a	Alexandru Belc	Romania, France
The Mountain	La montagne	Thomas Salvador	France
Mountain Woman	山女	Takeshi Fukunaga	Japan
Seventeeners	Hadinelentu	Prithvi Konanur	India
Trenque Lauquen	—N/a	Laura Citarella	Argentina, Germany
Victim	Oběť	Michal Blaško	Slovakia, Czech Republic, Germany
War Pony	—N/a	Riley Keough, Gina Gammell	United States
White Paradise	Les Survivants	Guillaume Renusson	France
The Worst Ones	Les Pires	Lise Akoka, Romane Gueret	France

=== Nordic Lights ===
A new special section titled "Nordic Lights" was introduced in this edition of the festival, showcasing works from Nordic cinema:

English title	Original title	Director(s)	Production countrie(s)
Compartment No. 6	Hytti nro 6	Juho Kuosmanen	Finland, Germany, Estonia, Russia
Godland	Volaða land	Hlynur Pálmason	Iceland, Denmark, France, Sweden
The Great Silence	Den Store Stilhed	Katrine Brocks	Denmark
Sick of Myself	Syk pike	Kristoffer Borgli	Norway, Sweden
Unruly	Ustyrlig	Malou Reymann	Denmark
The Woodcutter Story	Metsurin tarina	Mikko Myllylahti	Finland, The Netherlands, Denmark, Germany
The Kingdom: Exodus (Episode 1–5)	Riget Exodus	Lars von Trier	Denmark

=== Fantastic Beats ===
The following films have been selected for screening in the Fantastic Beats section:

English title	Original title	Director(s)	Production countrie(s)	Ref.
Marry My Dead Body	關於我和鬼變成家人的那件事	Cheng Wei-hao	Taiwan	
Bad Education	黑的教育	Kai Ko	Taiwan	
I Am What I Am	そばかす	Shinya Tamada	Japan	
My Love Affair with Marriage	—N/a	Signe Baumane	Latvia, United States, Luxembourg	
Egoist	エゴイスト	Matsunaga Daishi	Japan	
Do Unto Others	ロストケア	Tetsu Maeda	Japan	
You & Me & Me	เธอกับฉันกับฉัน	Wanweaw Hongvivatana, Weawwan Hongvivatana	Thailand	

=== Focus ===
==== The Complete Itami Juzo Directorial Retrospective ====
Digitally remastered 4K versions of all ten feature films made by Japanese filmmaker Juzo Itami were showcased at the festival:

English title	Original title	Director(s)	Year of release	Production countrie(s)
The Funeral	お葬式	Juzo Itami	1984	Japan
Tampopo	タンポポ	Juzo Itami	1985	Japan
A Taxing Woman	マルサの女	Juzo Itami	1987	Japan
A Taxing Woman's Return	マルサの女2	Juzo Itami	1988	Japan
A-Ge-Man: Tales of a Golden Geisha	あげまん	Juzo Itami	1990	Japan
Minbo	ミンボーの女	Juzo Itami	1992	Japan
Daibyonin	大病人	Juzo Itami	1993	Japan
A Quiet Life	静かな生活	Juzo Itami	1995	Japan
Supermarket Woman	スーパーの女	Juzo Itami	1996	Japan
Marutai	マルタイの女	Juzo Itami	1997	Japan

==== Jean-Luc Godard x Anna Karina: A Retrospective ====
To commemorate the passing of French filmmaker Jean-Luc Godard, eight feature films made by Godard and his muse and ex-wife, Hanne Karin Bayer, were showcased at the festival:

English title	Original title	Director(s)	Year of release	Production countrie(s)
The Little Soldier	Le petit soldat	Jean-Luc Godard	1963	France
A Woman Is a Woman	Une femme est une femme	Jean-Luc Godard	1961	France
My Life to Live	Vivre sa vie	Jean-Luc Godard	1962	France
Band of Outsiders	Bande à part	Jean-Luc Godard	1964	France
Alphaville	—N/a	Jean-Luc Godard	1965	France
Pierrot le Fou	—N/a	Jean-Luc Godard	1965	France
Made in U.S.A.	—N/a	Jean-Luc Godard	1966	France
The Oldest Profession: Anticipation	—N/a	Jean-Luc Godard	1967	France, Germany, Italy
