= To Be Continued =

To Be Continued may refer to:

- "To be continued", a common phrase used at the end of a narrative unit or work of fiction that ends on a cliffhanger

== Film and television ==
- To Be Continued (2018 film), a Latvian documentary
- To Be Continued (2023 film), a Hong Kong documentary
- Thodarum (lit. 'To be continued'), a 1999 Indian Tamil-language drama film
- Thudarum (lit. 'To be continued'), a 2025 Indian Malayalam-language thriller film
- To Be Continued (South Korean TV series), a 2015 series featuring the boy band Astro
- To Be Continued (Thai TV series), a 2024 boys' love romantic drama

== Music ==
- ...To Be Continued (Isaac Hayes album), 1970
- To Be Continued (Terje Rypdal album), 1981
- To Be Continued... (Elton John album), 1990
- To Be Continued... (Stefanie Sun album), 2003
- To Be Continued... (The Temptations album), 1986
- "To Be Continued", a song by Nancy Kwai, 2023

== See also ==
- ...Continued, a 1969 album by Tony Joe White
- To Be Continue(s), a concert film by Gen Hoshino from the 2018 album Live Tour: Continues
- 'Roundabout' (Yes song), 1971 song used as an internet meme along with the phrase 'To Be Continued'
