= Tótem (film) =

2023 Mexican drama film

- Theatrical release poster
- Directed by: Lila Avilés
- Screenplay by: Lila Avilés
- Produced by: Lila Avilés; Tatiana Graullera; Louise Riousse
- Starring: Naíma Sentíes; Monserrat Marañon; Marisol Gasé; Saori Gurza
- Cinematography: Diego Tenorio
- Edited by: Omar Guzmán
- Music by: Thomas Becka
- Production companies: Limerencia Films; Laterna Film; Paloma Productions
- Distributed by: Alpha Violet
- Release dates: 20 February 2023 (Berlinale); 30 November 2023 (Mexico)
- Running time: 95 minutes
- Countries: Mexico; Denmark; France
- Language: Spanish
- Box office: $165,444

Tótem is a 2023 drama film written and directed by Lila Avilés. The film depicts the story of seven-year-old Sol, who is spending the day at her grandfather's home, for a surprise party for Sol's father, Tonatiuh. As daylight fades, Sol comes to understand that her world is about to change dramatically. It was selected to compete for the Golden Bear at the 73rd Berlin International Film Festival, where it had its world premiere on 20 February 2023. It is a co-production between Mexico, Denmark and France.

It received critical acclaim and was named one of the top five international films of 2023 by the National Board of Review. The film was selected as the Mexican entry for Best International Feature Film at the 96th Academy Awards; it made the shortlist of 15 entries from which the nominees were selected.

== Plot ==
Sol, a seven-year-old girl, goes to her grandfather's home, where her aunts Nuri and Alejandra are throwing a birthday party for her father. It is probably his last, so in a sense it is also a farewell ceremony. With the onset of dusk, an unfamiliar and unrestrained atmosphere takes over, breaking the family bonds. For Sol, the world is about to change as she learns the essence of letting go and feels the breath of life.

== Cast ==
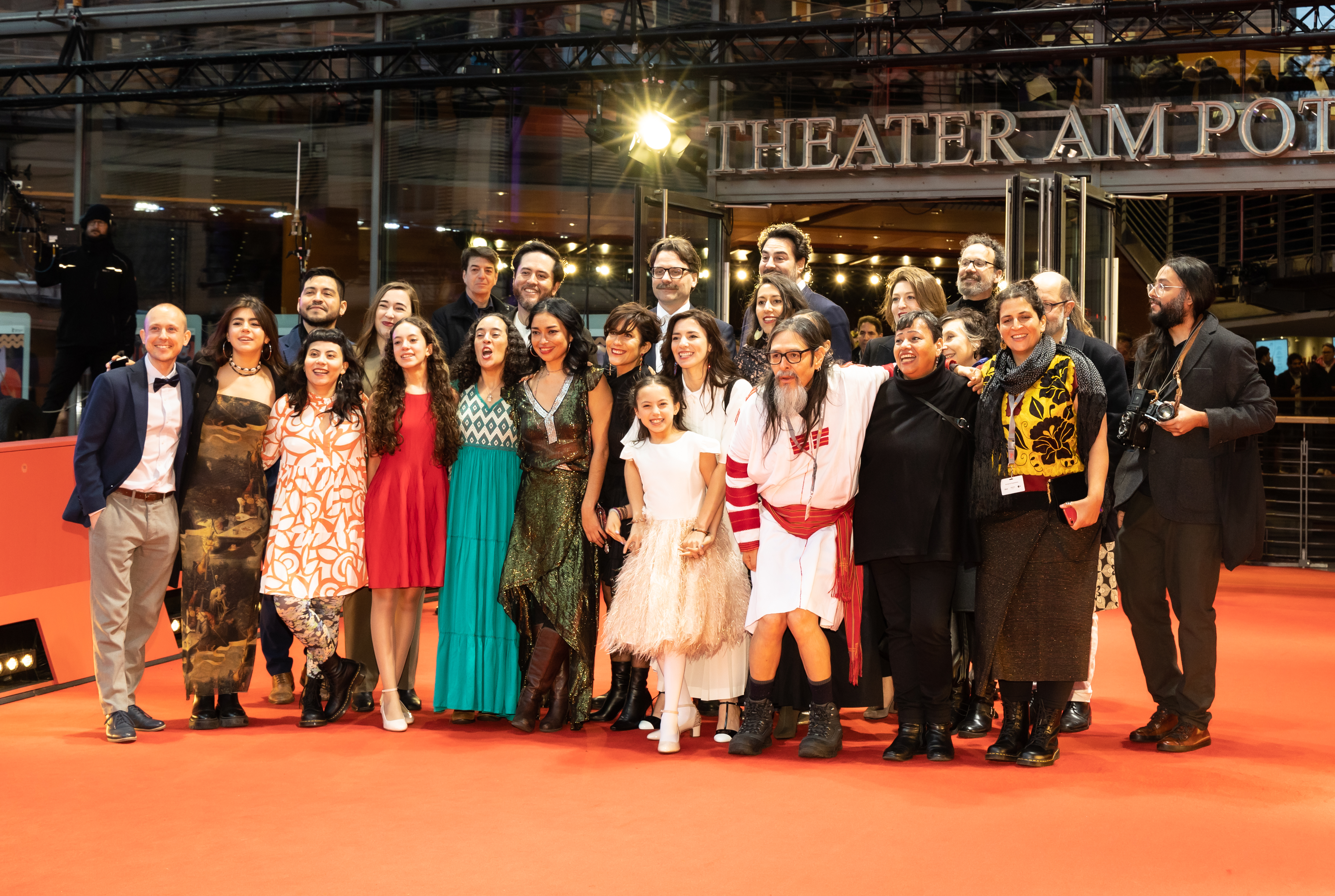
Cast and crew of Tótem at the Berlin Film Festival 2023

- Naíma Sentíes as Sol
- Montserrat Marañón as Nuri
- Marisol Gasé as Alejandra
- Saori Gurza as Esther
- Teresita Sánchez as Cruz
- Mateo García Elizondo as Tonatiuh
- Juan Francisco Maldonado as Napo
- Iazua Larios as Lucía
- Alberto Amador as Roberto

== Production ==
On 7 July 2020, it was reported that Lila Avilés was planning for her new film, Tótem. The film was among five upcoming feature projects to receive grants of €53,000 (US$60,000) from the Hubert Bals Fund (HBF), administered by the International Film Festival Rotterdam.

Tótem was produced by Limerencia Films and Laterna, in co-production with Danish firm Paloma Productions and France's Alpha Violet Production, who are also distributors. It is the second feature film of Lila Avilés after The Chambermaid. Naíma Sentíes as Sol, Montserrat Marañon as Nuri, Marisol Gasé as Alejandrato and Mateo García Elizondo as Sol's father Tonatiuh are cast in main roles.

== Release ==
The film had its world premiere on 20 February 2023 at the 73rd Berlin International Film Festival. In April it competed in the 47th Hong Kong International Film Festival, where it won the Firebird Award for the best film in Young Cinema Competition World category. It was invited to Horizons section of 57th Karlovy Vary International Film Festival, where it was screened on 30 June 2023. It was also invited to the 27th Lima Film Festival in Competition fiction section, where it was screened on August 11, 2023, and won the Best Picture award in the section. It was screened at the 2023 Atlantic International Film Festival in the World Cinema section on 17 September 2023. The film also made it to Latin Horizons section of the 71st San Sebastián International Film Festival held in September 2023. The film competed at the 2023 Calgary International Film Festival in 'International Narrative Competition' for Best International Narrative Feature award and had screening on September 22.

In October, the film was invited to the 2023 Vancouver International Film Festival in the Showcase section and was screened on 1 October; it was screened at the 2023 Festival du nouveau cinéma in International Panorama on 7 October; and at the 2023 BFI London Film Festival in the Strand section under the "Love" theme on 9 October. It competed in the Chicago International Film Festival in International Feature Competition and had screening on 14 October; later on 20 October, it was screened at the Vienna International Film Festival in Features section. It was also selected in 20th Latin Beat Film Festival in the 36th Tokyo International Film Festival and was screened on 27 October 2023.

The film opened in Mexican theatres on 30 November 2023. Sideshow and Janus Films acquired U.S. distribution rights to the film, scheduling it for a limited theatrical release in New York on January 26, 2024, and in Los Angeles on February 6, followed by a nationwide expansion weeks later. In January 2024, Salma Hayek Pinault, José Tamez and Siobhan Flynn came on board the film as executive producers through their company Ventanarosa.

== Reception ==
=== Critical response ===
On the review aggregator Rotten Tomatoes website, the film has an approval rating of 97% based on 77 reviews, with an average rating of 8.2/10. The website's critics consensus says: "A heartfelt film that tells a poignant story without straying into sentimentality, Tótem is a life-affirming triumph for writer-director Lila Avilés." On Metacritic, it has a weighted average score of 91 out of 100 based on 21 reviews, indicating "universal acclaim".

Stephen Saito's review on the website The Moveable Fest wrote called the film "a thrillingly vital family portrait about a clan that does its very best to celebrate someone they’re about to mourn". Jonathan Romney reviewing for Screen International wrote, "This thematically rich piece offers a set of vivid character studies, while musing on life, death and time – largely from a child’s perspective." Marina Ashioti writing in Little White Lies stated, "A tender spirit of warmth and levity permeates the screen, sustaining a buoyancy that keeps the film from sinking into mawkish waters." Fabien Lemercier reviewing for Cineuropa praised the film and wrote, "It’s a film full of life and soul and a modestly deceptive work, for its significance is enormous."

=== Accolades ===
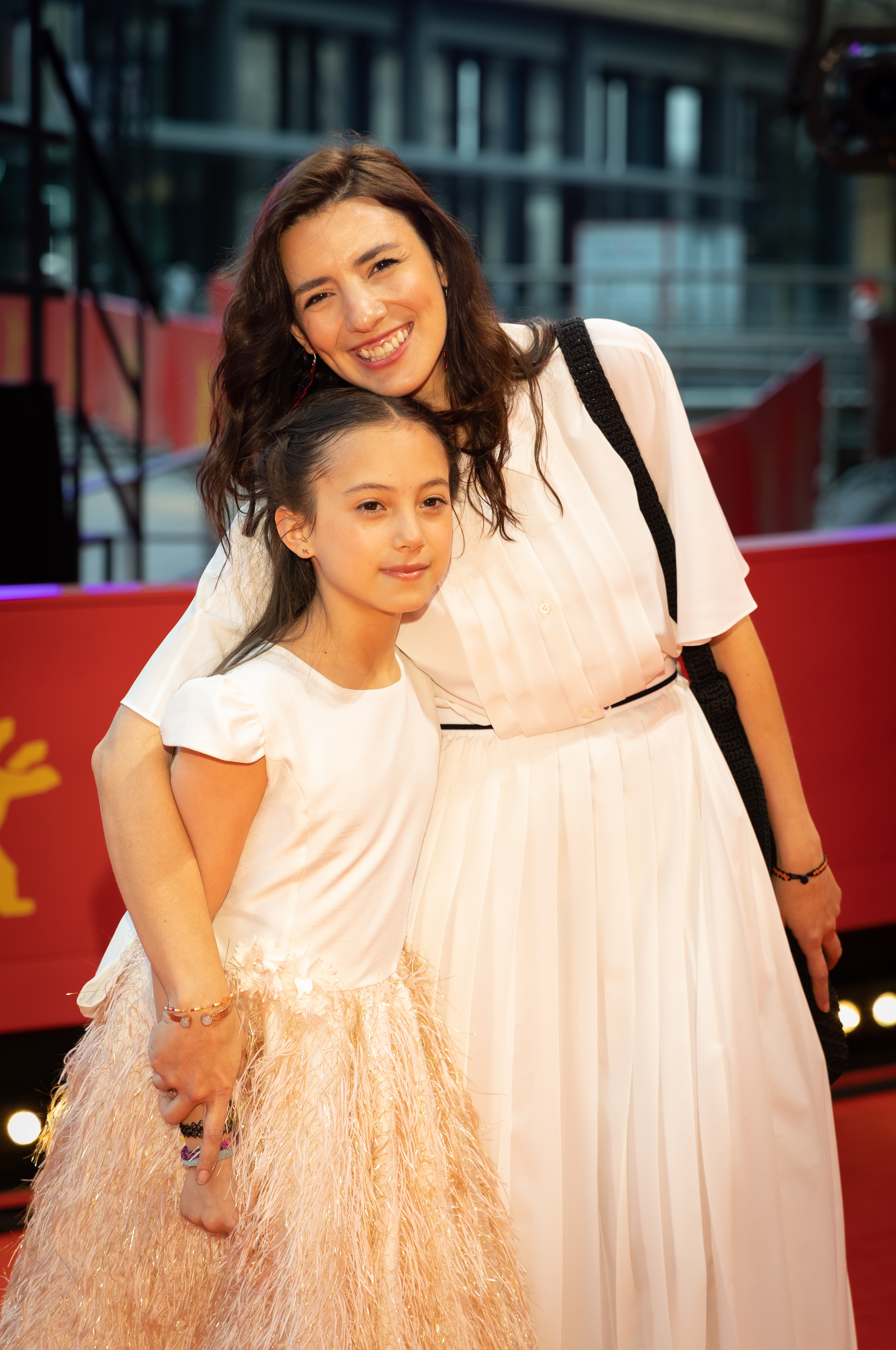
Lila Avilés, the director with child actor Naíma Sentíes at Berlinale 2023

| Award | Date | Category | Recipient | Result | Ref. |
|---|---|---|---|---|---|
| Berlin International Film Festival | 25 February 2023 | Golden Bear | Tótem | Nominated | |
| Berlin International Film Festival | 25 February 2023 | Prize of the Ecumenical Jury | Tótem | Won | |
| Hong Kong International Film Festival | 9 April 2023 | Firebird Award | Tótem | Won | |
| Jerusalem Film Festival | 23 July 2023 | The Nechama Rivilin Award for Best International Film | Tótem | Nominated | |
| Jerusalem Film Festival | 23 July 2023 | Best Director | Lila Áviles | Won | |
| Lima Film Festival | 18 August 2023 | Best Picture | Tótem | Won | |
| Lima Film Festival | 18 August 2023 | Best Cinematography | Diego Tenorio | Won | |
| Melbourne International Film Festival | 20 August 2023 | Bright Horizons Award | Tótem | Nominated | |
| San Sebastián International Film Festival | 30 September 2023 | Horizons Award | Tótem | Nominated | |
| Calgary International Film Festival | 1 October 2023 | Best International Narrative Feature | Tótem | Nominated | |
| Athens International Film Festival | 9 October 2023 | Best Picture | Tótem | Nominated | |
| Chicago International Film Festival | 22 October 2023 | Gold Hugo | Tótem | Nominated | |
| Montclair Film Festival | 29 October 2023 | Fiction Feature | Tótem | Nominated | |
| Montclair Film Festival | 29 October 2023 | Special Jury Prize for Directing | Lila Avilés | Won | |
| Gotham Independent Film Awards | 27 November 2023 | Best International Feature | Tótem | Nominated | |
| National Board of Review | 6 December 2023 | Top Five International Films | Tótem | Won (Note: This award does not have a single winner, but recognizes multiple films.) | |
| Los Angeles Film Critics Association Awards | 10 December 2023 | Best Foreign Language Film | Tótem | Runner-up | |
| Independent Spirit Awards | 25 February 2024 | Best International Film | Tótem | Nominated | |
| Diosas de Plata | 19 March 2024 | Best Supporting Actress | Marisol Gasé | Nominated | |
| Diosas de Plata | 19 March 2024 | Best Child Actress | Naíma Sentíes | Nominated | |
| Platino Awards | 20 April 2024 | Best Ibero-American Film | Tótem | Nominated | |
| Platino Awards | 20 April 2024 | Best Director | Lila Avilés | Nominated | |
| Ariel Awards | 7 September 2024 | Best Film | Tótem | Won | |
| Ariel Awards | 7 September 2024 | Best Director | Lila Avilés | Won | |
| Ariel Awards | 7 September 2024 | Best Supporting Actress | Montserrat Marañón | Won | |
| Ariel Awards | 7 September 2024 | Best Supporting Actress | Marisol Gasé | Nominated | |
| Ariel Awards | 7 September 2024 | Best Supporting Actress | Teresa Sánchez | Nominated | |
| Ariel Awards | 7 September 2024 | Best Supporting Actor | Mateo García Elizondo | Nominated | |
| Ariel Awards | 7 September 2024 | Best Breakthrough Performance | Naíma Sentíes | Won | |
| Ariel Awards | 7 September 2024 | Best Breakthrough Performance | Saori Gurza | Nominated | |
| Ariel Awards | 7 September 2024 | Best Original Screenplay | Lila Avilés | Won | |
| Ariel Awards | 7 September 2024 | Best Cinematography | Diego Tenorio | Nominated | |
| Ariel Awards | 7 September 2024 | Best Costume Design | Jimena Fernández and Nora Solís | Nominated | |
| Ariel Awards | 7 September 2024 | Best Art Direction | Nohemí González | Nominated | |
| Ariel Awards | 7 September 2024 | Best Makeup | Vanessa Coty | Nominated | |
| Ariel Awards | 7 September 2024 | Best Sound | Rune Palving, Daniel Rojo Solís and Guido Berenblum | Nominated | |
| Ariel Awards | 7 September 2024 | Best Editing | Omar Guzmán | Nominated | |

== See also ==
- List of Mexican films of 2023
- List of Mexican submissions for the Academy Award for Best International Feature Film
- List of submissions to the 96th Academy Awards for Best International Feature Film
