= Paul Chan Chi Yuen =

Paul Chan Chi Yuen (Chinese: 陳智遠; born 21 July 1979) is a former political assistant to the Secretary for Food and Health in Hong Kong. In 2013, he, along with three acquaintances, founded Walk in Hong Kong, a local cultural enterprise.

Through the organisation, Chan champions conservation campaigns and organises heritage-related walking tours. His work has been profiled by major local and international media, including the South China Morning Post, Reuters, Bloomberg, and China Daily. He is also a regular commentator on tourism and urban development issues.

== Biography ==
He graduated from Wah Yan College, Kowloon, before earning a Bachelor of Laws and a Postgraduate Certificate in Laws from the University of Hong Kong. He later completed a Master of Philosophy in Political Science at the Chinese University of Hong Kong. As a recipient of the British Chevening Scholarship, he went on to earn a Master of Science in Comparative Politics from the London School of Economics and Political Science. He also spent six months conducting research at Tsinghua University in Beijing.

Chan is a founding member of the Roundtable Institute, a Hong Kong think tank. He later worked as a senior research assistant at the Governance in Asia Research Centre at City University of Hong Kong, co-founded by former academic and Hong Kong government minister Anthony Cheung. Concurrently, he was a part-time lecturer in comparative politics at the Chinese University of Hong Kong. During this period, he also served as a guest host and commentator for RTHK current affairs programs, including Pentaprism and Headliner, and contributed opinion pieces to publications such as Ming Pao, the Hong Kong Economic Journal, the Hong Kong Economic Times, and City Magazine.

In May 2008, the Hong Kong SAR Government appointed Chan as political assistant to the Secretary for Food and Health. Drawing on his background in think tanks and civil society, he advised the then-Secretary, York Chow, on policy matters. At the time of his appointment, Chan was the youngest official in the government's Political Appointments System.

During his tenure, he worked on a wide range of public health and food safety issues. These included columbarium management, the voluntary health insurance scheme, tobacco control measures, and the enforcement of a trawling ban in Hong Kong waters. He was also involved in the government's response to the swine flu epidemic, the melamine contamination incident, and the fallout from the Fukushima nuclear leak.

== Cultural interests and tourism career ==
Chan has traveled extensively, visiting nearly 90 countries across Asia, Europe and South America, as well as the unrecognised state of Transnistria. He co-founded the travel agency GLO TRAVEL, where he has guided tours to destinations such as Kazakhstan and Uzbekistan, offering participants insights into local history and international relations.

Drawing on his social observations and interest in current affairs, Chan has published several books. Following his departure from government service, he released a travelogue titled Long Journey: Listening to the Cultural Path (《遠行﹣細聽文化旅途》) and frequently gives lectures to share his travel experiences.

As a co-founder of the cultural enterprise Walk in Hong Kong, Chan promotes sustainable, in-depth cultural tourism. The organisation focuses on highlighting Hong Kong's unique history, community values and neighborhood life. Its work has been noted in the press for exploring lesser-known aspects of the city's heritage through experience-based tourism.

Walk in Hong Kong was awarded the gold prize at the 2017 HSBC Youth Business Awards. Through the enterprise, Chan has been actively involved in local conservation campaigns. His efforts include successfully lobbying to upgrade the State Theatre from a Grade 3 to a Grade 1 Historic Building and advocating for the preservation of the Ex-Sham Shui Po Service Reservoir. He also helped initiate the conservation campaign for the Western-style tenement building at 190 Nathan Road, resulting in its elevation to a Grade 2 Historic Building after uncovering its history during the Japanese occupation.

During the COVID-19 pandemic, Walk in Hong Kong adapted to travel restrictions by offering virtual walking tours. A Reuters report highlighted how these "walk from home" tours successfully reached online audiences while in-person tourism was suspended.

Chan is frequently cited as a commentator on tourism development and related policy issues. In a 2024 feature on ‘special forces-styled travel’ among mainland Chinese visitors, he analysed the shift from luxury shopping to intensive, short-term itineraries and "city walk" experiences, discussing its implications for the local sector. He has also emphasised how neighbourhood history can foster closer engagement between residents and visitors. He has also highlighted walking tours, conservation campaigns and film projects as effective tools for civic engagement in heritage preservation.

Bridging pop culture and cultural tourism, Chan served as a co-executive producer and investor for the film Far Far Away. He designed location-based tours related to the movie and organised community screenings in the Hakka villages of Mui Tsz Lam and Lai Chi Wo.

Continuing his advocacy for cultural innovation, Chan collaborates with experts across Asia in heritage conservation. He has argued that historical buildings are crucial cultural resources for tourism, arguing that revitalising these structures is essential for Hong Kong's status as a top-tier tourist destination. He currently serves as a consultant for various local tourism labs and is the chairman of the Hong Kong Community Heritage Foundation. In these roles, as well as through his work as a producer on the documentary To Be Continued, he actively promotes community placemaking.
