= Jay Chern =

American film producer

- Education: University of Texas at Arlington (BFA); Taipei National University of the Arts (MFA)
- Awards: Best Directing for a Mini-Series/TV Movie, Golden Bell Awards; 2011 Thief (Xiao Tou)Golden Horse Awards – Best Short Film; 2011 Thief (Xiao Tou)

Jay Chern (Chinese: 陳鈺杰) is a Taiwanese-American film director, screenwriter and producer. His short film Thief (Xiao Tou) (2011) won a Best Short Film award at the 2011 Golden Horse Film Festival, as well as a Best Directing award at Taiwan's Golden Bell Awards.

== Early life and education ==
Chern grew up in Texas and attended Plano East Senior High School in Plano, Texas, where he started his first web company at age 17. He was an all-state violinist, professional gamer, and green belt double gold medalist in the U.S. Taekwondo Junior National Championships.

When he was young, he made a three-minute short film that eventually aired on The Best Damn Sports Show Period. He also interned at the ReelFX creative studio (where he got assistance from Corey Snyder on his animated short film Dk9000), and received a scholarship from the Wishful Wings Artist Competition. He attended the University of Texas at Arlington, graduating with a Bachelor of Fine Arts (B.F.A.) in film/cinema/video studies (summa cum laude) in 2006. He also graduated with a Masters of Fine Arts (M.F.A.) degree in film directing from the Taipei National University of the Arts in 2009.

== Career ==
=== Short films and music videos ===
Chern wrote, directed and edited several films he shot in the United States while attending UT Arlington. Among them were Then Hereafter (2004) (starring Johnny Simmons), Spilled (2006) (starring Camille Chen), Stand (2006), Dk9000 (2006) (an animated short film), and It's The Delivery (2009).

In 2011, Chern wrote, directed, edited, produced and shot a short film set in Taipei, Taiwan - specifically the Night markets in Taiwan - entitled Thief (Chinese title: Xiao Tou), starring Zhi-Ying Zhu, Chung-Jui Chang, Heng-yin Chou, Kai-Hsun Chuang, Jian-Wei Huang, Na-Dou Lin, and Pi-Lien Wu. The film ended up winning a "Best Short Film" award from the 2011 Golden Horse Film Festival and Awards, a "Best Directing" award from the Golden Bell Awards (viewed as Taiwan's version of The Emmys), a "Best Short Film" in the Asia International Competition from the Short Shorts Film Festival & Asia, a "Best Narrative Short" award from the 2012 Eugene International Film Festival, and an Honorable Mention for Best Short film from the 2012 Los Angeles Asian Pacific Film Festival. The film was also nominated for a Best Short Film Festival Prize from the 2011 Taipei Film Festival, the Muhr AsiaAfrica Award from the Dubai International Film Festival and Best Mini-Series/TV Movie, Best Writing for a TV-Series/Movie (Jay Chern), Best Cinematography (Jay Chern), and Best Editing (Jay Chern and Hsi-Chieh Wang) from the 2012 Golden Bell Awards.

Chern was cinematographer on a music video for the theme song of Hayao Miyazaki's final animated film, The Wind Rises: Singer-songwriter Yumi Matsutoya's 1973 song "Hikōki-gumo" (ひこうき雲), who sang the piece again for the music video, which features footage of her performance in a studio.

=== Feature films ===
In 2014, Chern co-wrote (with Erica Chen and Garance Li-Wen Wang), directed, edited, produced and shot his first feature film, which was entitled Dawn/Spring (2014). It tells the story of a physics teacher who deals with Newton's third law in real life; the abuses on a body and the forces acting upon it are counter-acted with an emotional response to said forces. The film was co-produced and co-financed by China Television (CTV) and starred Oliver Chou, Helena Hsu, Kang-i Lee, Kingone Wang, Tao-Nan Wang, Color Yan, and Chen-Ling Wen, who won the "Best Performance by an Actress in a Supporting Role" award at the 2014 Golden Bell Awards for her performance in the film. The film was also nominated for a Best Writing for a Mini-Series/TV Movie award (Erica Chang, Jay Chern, Garance Li-Wen Wang), a Best Directing for a Mini-Series/TV Movie award (Jay Chern), a Best Cinematography award (Jay Chern, Ho-Chen Lin), a Best Performance by an Actress in a Mini-Series/TV Movie (Kang-i Lee) and a Best Mini-Series/TV Movie.

In 2015, Chern wrote, directed, produced and shot another feature-length film entitled Warmth (2015), which chronicles under-aged girls working as KTV hostesses sent to a rehabilitation camp. The film stars Joy Pan, Zhi-Ying Zhu (from Chern's previous short film, Thief or Xiao Tou), Yu-Qing Hong and Ai-Ning Yao.

In 2018, Chern wrote (with Mami Sunada) and directed the Japanese feature film Omotenashi: The Ceremony. It premiered at several film festivals including the Hong Kong International Film Festival, the Vancouver Asian Film Festival, the Los Angeles Asian Pacific Film Festival, Filmart 2018, and the Houston Asian American Pacific Islander Film Festival.

=== Other work ===
Chern also served as a cinematographer/director of photography and second camera on the documentary about Studio Ghibli, The Kingdom of Dreams and Madness (2013), directed by Mami Sunada.
