= Elegies (film) =

2023 Hong Kong film by Ann Hui

- Theatrical release poster
- Traditional Chinese: 詩
- Literal meaning: Poetry
- Jyutping: Si^{1}
- Directed by: Ann Hui
- Produced by: Ken Hui
- Cinematography: Mike Mak
- Edited by: Salt & Vinegar
- Music by: Olivier Cong
- Production company: PicaPica Media
- Distributed by: Golden Scene
- Release dates: 30 March 2023 (HKIFF); 23 November 2023 (Hong Kong)
- Running time: 101 minutes
- Country: Hong Kong
- Languages: Cantonese; Mandarin

Elegies (Chinese: 詩) is a 2023 Hong Kong documentary film directed by Ann Hui. Produced by PicaPica Media and distributed by Golden Scene, the film features interviews with various Hong Kong poets, most notably Huang Canran and Liu Wai-tong, along with footage of the late Xi Xi and Leung Ping-kwan. The film dissects the daily lives of Hong Kong poets and examines their views on poetry, exploring the decline of Hong Kong's poetry culture.

Intending to create a documentary about classical Chinese poetry during her early filmmaking career in the 1970s, Ann Hui cited various challenges that hindered her progress. She revisited the project during the COVID-19 pandemic, and began writing the outline and conducting research starting in 2020. Principal photography took place from March to September 2021 in Hong Kong, Shenzhen, and Taipei, where she interviewed migrated poets Huang and Liu. Post-production lasted several additional months, with input from William Chang, who also handled the colour grading.

The film had its world premiere on 30 March 2023 as the opening film of the 47th Hong Kong International Film Festival, followed by a theatrical release in Hong Kong on 23 November. It received a nomination for Best Documentary Feature in the 60th Golden Horse Awards and garnered positive reviews from critics, who praised its subject matter, tone, and narrative approach.

== Synopsis ==
Elegies is divided into three parts: The first part includes interviews with poets Wai Yuen, Yam Gong, Deng Ah-lam, and York Ma, along with archival footage of the late Xi Xi and Leung Ping-kwan; the second part includes an interview with poet and translator Huang Canran, who migrated to Shenzhen to write poetry in seclusion; while the third part includes an interview with poet and university lecturer Liu Wai-tong, who moved to Taiwan for a teaching position and started a family.

In the first part, Wai Yuen defined the essence of poetry, stating that any subject, even mundane ones, can inspire poetic expression, while highlighting the unique and tangible qualities of local Hong Kong poetry amid the dominance of modernism in Taiwan and mainland China. Yam Gong suggested that the unpredictability of poetry reflects the poet's deeper thoughts about the current social state of Hong Kong. Xi Xi noted that, although she was not born in Hong Kong, she identifies local Hong Kong poetry with themes of everyday life and nostalgia, citing recurring imageries such as "Kai Tak Airport" and "lemon tea" as examples that evoke these characteristics. Leung Ping-kwan discussed the connections between contemporary Western poetries and the literary scenes in Taiwan and mainland China, including interactions with the Misty Poets. Deng Ah-lam examined the difference between concrete and abstract words in Cantonese, emphasising the importance of using native language in poetry, which reflects his intuitive approach as a poet. York Ma, known for writing topographical poetry, viewed poems primarily as a means to express his ideals, often using landscape imagery to convey deeper themes such as political views. Ann Hui also reminisced about the late Xi Xi and Leung Ping-kwan.

In the second part, the film showcased poet Huang Canran's life in Dongbei Village, Shenzhen, where he migrated to avoid the high cost of living in Hong Kong, describing himself as an "economic exile". (Note: Huang migrated to Dongbei Village in June 2014.) He discussed the essence of being a poet with Ann Hui, emphasising the importance of poetry over commercial success and valuing the creative process itself, which inspired him to adopt a modest lifestyle. Despite facing depression in his early years, he found freedom in his writing, prioritising artistic integrity over publication. His profound perspective saw poetry as an essential pursuit that transcended monetary worth, which he articulated through his works, including the poem "In the Teahouse".

In the third part, Hui visited Liu Wai-tong in Taiwan, who migrated in 2018. In contrast to Huang, Liu led a multifaceted life, balancing roles in literature, music, social activism, and university teaching, while embodying a more conventional lifestyle with a stable family. The film featured some of his lectures, where he shared his views on the works of Paul Celan and Bertolt Brecht, and presented records of his past involvement in social movements, such as the Preservation campaign for Queen's Pier. The film traced his meetings with other Hong Kong poets who moved to Taiwan, including Chan Wai and Huang Run-yu. Huang Run-yu discussed the functions of poetry, citing her experiences of writing letters to friends imprisoned for the 2019–2020 Hong Kong protests as an example. The film concluded with Ann Hui's monologue about her motivation for creating the documentary, and expressed how poetry provided solace and resonance through words.

== Production ==
=== Background ===
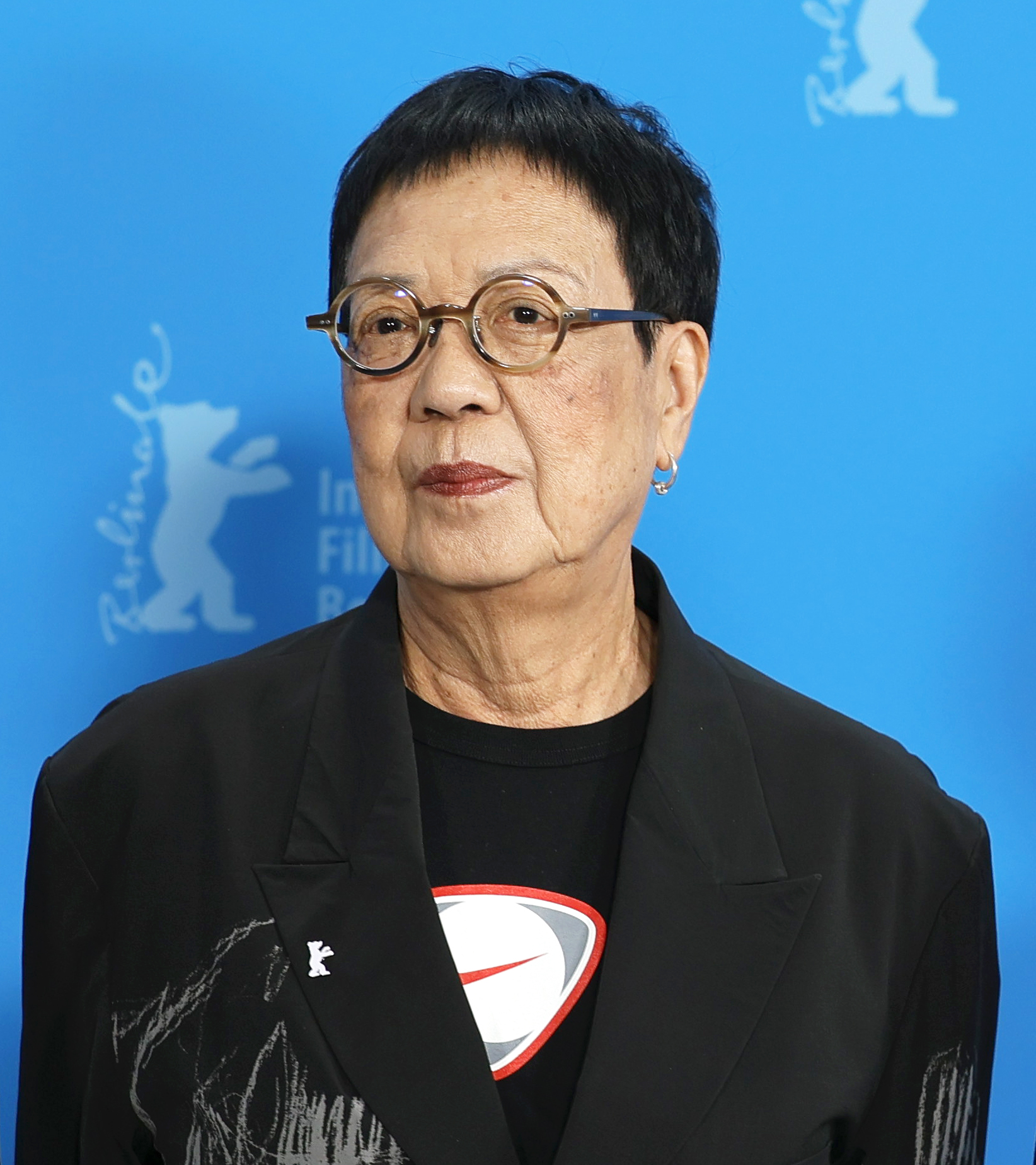
Director Ann Hui

Filmmaker Ann Hui was introduced to poetry as a child, where her grandfather taught her the works of Li Bai. (Note: There are conflicting reports regarding the age at which Ann Hui was introduced to poetry by her grandfather, with The Reporter stating she was three years old, while CommonWealth Magazine stating it was five.) She continued to enjoy reading and developed a fondness for poetry during her secondary school years, particularly the 18th and 19th centuries poets like John Keats, and members of the Crescent Moon Society like Xu Zhimo and Bing Xin. She described poetry as "her protective talisman" that accompanied her through her youth. Hui then studied literature at the University of Hong Kong, majoring in poetry. She graduated with first class honours for her bachelor's degree and earned a master's degree in comparative literature. Her master's thesis originally focused on American poet Ezra Pound and his translations of Chinese poems, but during her studies, she developed an interest in film, prompting her to switch her research topic to French filmmaker Alain Robbe-Grillet. She continued her film studies in the United Kingdom and began her filmmaking career at TVB in 1975.

Around 1976, after completing the anthology series Below the Lion Rock, Hui intended to pursue two passion projects: one was an adaptation of Eileen Chang's novella Love in a Fallen City (1943), and the other a documentary about classical Chinese poetry. She decided to prioritise the novel adaptation and completed the film Love in a Fallen City (1984). However, despite her enthusiasm, she did not pursue her poetry documentary for several decades due to challenges in presenting it on screen, a lack of audience interest that made securing funding difficult, and a scarcity of time and interested fellow filmmakers to collaborate on the project. Hui was also interested in making documentaries throughout her filmmaking career but had limited opportunities, aside from creating a 45-minute piece titled Three Women (1992) for RTHK and co-producing a Handover-themed documentary As Time Goes By (1997) with Peggy Chiao. She cited the presence of many talented individuals in documentary filmmaking and her unfamiliarity with the equipment needed for filming and editing as reasons for her minimal involvement.

=== Conception ===
During the COVID-19 pandemic, numerous filming projects were postponed or scrapped, prompting Ann Hui to explore alternative approaches to filmmaking, which she found to be more flexible in the realm of documentary. She came across the poem "Woman in Love" by Huang Canran, which she found rich in imagery and dramatic quality, and inspired her to revisit her previous poetry project idea. She selected Huang Canran and Liu Wai-tong as the main features of the film due to her appreciation for their poetry. Hui was acquainted with Liu as a photographer prior to the shoot, having first met him in June 2007 when Liu was interviewing a group of cultural figures from Hong Kong. Although Hui did not know Huang personally before the shoot, she deemed him suitable for the film because his poetry often presents insights into time and dimension, which she found it rich in both poetic and cinematic qualities. The non-local backgrounds of Huang and Liu were not considered in Hui's decisions, which she described as a mere coincidence that she viewed as representative of the Hong Kong diaspora, reflecting that not every Hongkonger who left the place shares the same reasons and characteristics. Initially, she intended to interview just the two of them, but realised that focusing solely on them would lack context and relational depth, as their recognition alone was insufficient, which prompted her to interview several older and established poets, including Wai Yuen, Yam Gong, Deng Ah-lam, and York Ma. She was introduced to Wai Yuen and Yam Gong through acquaintances who praised their poetry, and she found a striking contrast between the modernity expressed in their work and their ages, which range from 70 to 80.

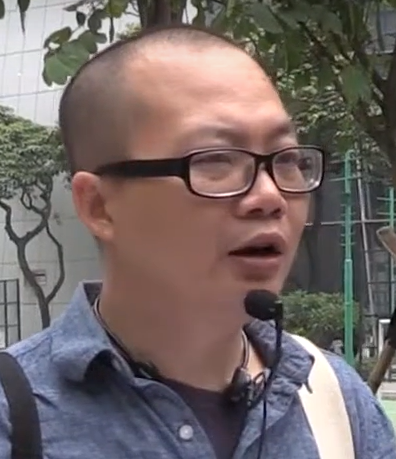
Poet Liu Wai-tong, a major interviewee in the film

In mid-2020, Hui wrote an outline to the Hong Kong Arts Development Council to apply for funding but was unsuccessful. She then sought funding from various art foundations and ultimately approached Ken Hui, the owner of PicaPica Media, to co-create the project. Hui described this outcome as "more pleasing", expressing concerns about censorship if they received funding from the Art Development Council, but sourcing funds from private foundations has no requirements on the content. Neither Ann nor Ken Hui received any compensation due to the film's limited budget.

Hui began advancing the project in late 2020, starting her research and reading works by different poets. She also required the entire crew to familiarise themselves with the poems of Huang and Liu. For each interviewee, she would select 20 of their poems, choose 10 to feature, and then narrow it down to six or eight for the final cut, discussing which ones to cut with the poets during the interviews. Hui used Elegies as the working title for the project, inspired by a suite of poems of the same name written by Huang Canran in the 1990s, which she found touching while reading during the film's pre-production. (Note: "Elegies #7", the seventh piece in Huang Canran's Elegies suite, was featured in the film and narrated by Huang himself.) It ultimately became the English name of the film. However, the literal translation of "elegies" in Chinese, "哀歌", means "the song of sorrow", (Note: According to Liu Wai-tong, the Chinese translation of "elegy" is not accurate, as it emphasises the "elevated emotion" of sorrow found in classical Western literature. He suggested that "頌歌" (song of ode) might be a more fitting translation.) which Hui found inauspicious, so she chose to name it "詩" (poetry) in Chinese instead.

=== Filming ===
Principal photography began in March 2021, with a crew of just five people. Hui found that larger filming crews often have overly specialised roles and shift responsibilities onto one another, resulting in inefficiency, prompting her to choose a small crew for Elegies to allow for greater flexibility. Hui briefed Huang and Liu about their filming plan and interview direction prior to the shoot, to respect their privacy and avoid discussing topics that the interviewees prefer not to address. She would draft a list of questions before interviews but allowed the discussions to flow freely once filming began. For instance, the parts where Liu read his own poems were not scripted and were improvised by him.

Hui interviewed Huang at Dongbei Village, Shenzhen, where he resided. In her original concept, she intended to adapt several poems into dramatic scenes and invite the poets to narrate them during intervals of their interviews. The crew hired actors to film Huang's "In the Teahouse" to visualise the hopeless man depicted in the poem. During Huang's interview, Hui also wanted to adapt his poem "Woman In Love" and asked him to play the male protagonist alongside an actress. Huang initially declined, feeling "too different" from the character, and although Hui insisted, his performance was described by her as "awful", leading to the scene being cut. Hui ultimately scrapped the entire idea of visualising the poems, explaining that the illustrations provided by the scenes did not enhance the poems themselves. Huang's girlfriend, daughter, and sister were also interviewed, with Huang introducing his girlfriend to the crew and the team visiting his sister after returning to Hong Kong to discuss their family's experiences moving from Fujian to Hong Kong during their youth. While discussing young poets, Huang recommended five to Hui, and she found the work of one poet, Huang Run-yu, particularly moving. She approached her for an interview, which was briefly featured in the film.

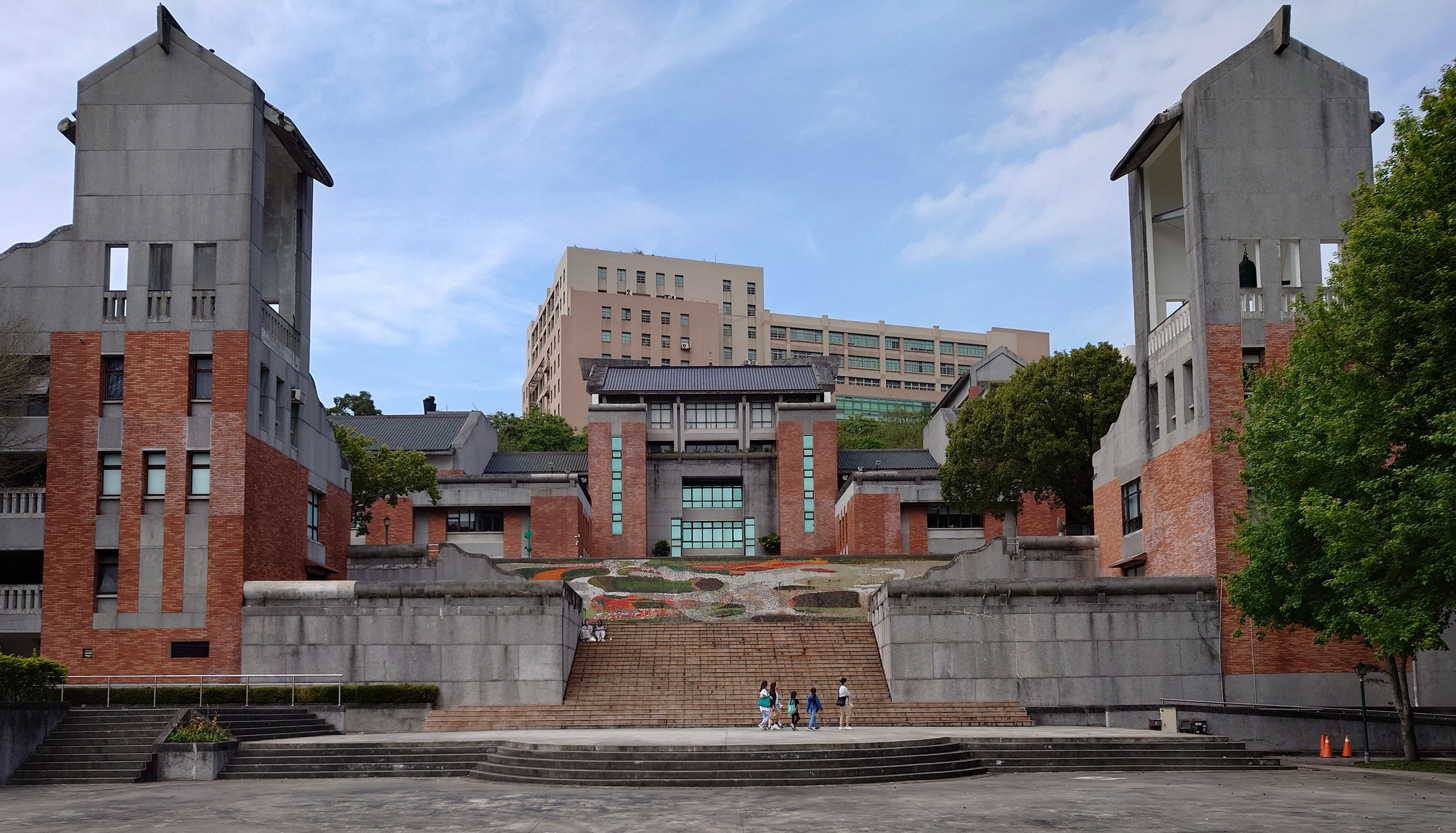
Parts of Liu Wai-tong's interview were filmed on the campus of the Taipei National University of the Arts.

In May 2021, the crew continued filming in Taiwan during the peak of the COVID-19 pandemic in the country. The producer initially considered cancelling the shoot due to safety concerns after Hui arrived and completed her quarantine, but Hui insisted on proceeding since she was already on location. She conducted the interview with Liu in Taipei, including filming at the Taipei National University of the Arts where Liu was a lecturer. Due to the pandemic, Liu had suspended all his daily activities and spent most of his time at home with his family, conducting university lectures through web conferencing. The crew also avoided many filming opportunities around Liu to prevent the risk of transmitting the virus to his children. Hui described her crew as "disappointed" by the lack of footage, but she viewed it as a metaphor for Liu's otherwise ordinary life, which the pandemic had naturally magnified, making it "unique" to him.

Hui also interviewed two poets, Jacky Yuen and Hong Wai, who argued during the interview. However, Hui decided not to include it in the film to avoid adding another subplot and diversifying the narrative, suggesting that this footage might be developed into a sequel. Filming also took place in Hong Kong, and wrapped up in September 2021.

=== Post-production ===
Editing spanned about four to five months. Ann Hui only vaguely described her expectations to the editor and allowed him to work independently. She was pleased with the product presented by the editor, and only minimal changes were made. She described the film's editing as "akin to poetry", noting that she felt the structural tone could be "lyrical" and she wanted to balance the pace by putting some space in between scenes. She let Huang and Liu watch the rough cut to identify any parts they found inappropriate for cutting. Veteran film editor William Chang, who the crew initially consulted for opinions on the rough cut, grew fond of the film and offered to help with colour grading. The film also features a score by Olivier Cong. Hui noted that Cong identified a structural flaw in the transition between the first and second parts, which was too fragmented, and suggested reusing the same music throughout the film to create continuity.

== Themes ==
Ann Hui expressed that the inspiration for creating Elegies was to bring public awareness to Hong Kong poetry, encouraging people to recognise that many poets are still actively writing and to gain insight into their perspectives on Hong Kong. Writer Tang Siu-wa concurred, highlighting that Hui's depiction of poetry showcases its power and relevance, especially through young poet Huang Run-yu's emotional ties and Hui's personal reflections. Critics compared the film to Jia Zhangke's Swimming Out Till the Sea Turns Blue (2020), which explores cultural losses in China's modernisation. Forrest Cardamenis noted that the film captures a similar "seismic shift" in Hong Kong's poetry culture caused by societal changes, albeit with minimal verbal hints, the "imminence and uncertainty" of the poets is reflected in the film's formal approach. Similarly, scholar Gloria Tsui identified political metaphors intertwined with nostalgia for the old Hong Kong, highlighting the film's evocation of loss and uncertainty in Hong Kong, as well as concerns over tightening creative freedom after the 2019–2020 Hong Kong protests. Liu, the interviewee, also compared the film to the censorship of poetry collections in Hong Kong public libraries, stating that a sense of taboo towards poetry only arises from a heightened awareness of people's understanding of poetry's power, which echos with what Hui aims to convey through the film.

Film critic Sek Kei described Elegies as an unavoidably political film that serves as an "elegy for Hong Kong", noting references to Liu's social activism and citations of Bertolt Brecht and Paul Celan, both of whom criticised the silence during authoritarianism, reflecting Ann Hui's sentiments about Hong Kong's changing social atmosphere. Interviewee Huang Canran shared this perspective, noting that the film's structure is carefully planned by Hui. He cited the western modern poetries as a thread running throughout the film, highlighting that he worked on many Chinese translations of Brecht's works, which aligns with the film's emphasis on his identity as a translator, and included a lecture by Liu discussing Brecht's works afterwards. Huang remarked that Hui cleverly employs the ambiguous nature of poetry, using his absence from the turmoil in Hong Kong since 2014 to create a contrast with York Ma's political statements and Celan's insights regarding "realities that cannot be named in words" in the first and third parts of the film. Liu also commented on the film's inclusion of his Celan lecture, interpreting it as Hui's use of poetry's metaphorical nature, as emphasised by Celan, with elements not shown in the film serving as an "unspoken resonance".

== Release ==
Elegies had its world premiere as the opening film of the 47th Hong Kong International Film Festival on 30 March 2023 alongside Soi Cheang's Mad Fate (2023), followed by screenings in the Icons section of the 28th Busan International Film Festival and at the 2023 Golden Horse Film Festival. Worldwide distribution rights were acquired by Golden Scene in September 2023. It was theatrically released in Hong Kong on 23 November 2023, and was subsequently screened at the 53rd International Film Festival Rotterdam, marking its European premiere. The film was also screened at the 7th Malaysia International Film Festival and the 54th International Film Festival of India, and received a theatrical release in Taiwan on 22 March 2024.

== Reception ==
Elegies's critical reception was positive. As of January 2024, the film held a rating of over 8.0/10 on the Chinese media review platform Douban.

Edmund Lee of the South China Morning Post gave Elegies 3.5/5 stars, calling it "an opaque and borderline esoteric introduction" to Hong Kong poetry, where the "personal and highly technical" interviews with Huang Canran and Liu Wai-tong provided insights into their struggles and reflections on the changes in the city, all of which he attributed to Ann Hui's "professional pedigree and charisma", enabling the artistic passion project to secure a commercial release. Lee also ranked the film 13th out of the 37 Hong Kong films theatrically released in 2023. Wendy Ide at Screen International praised the film as "a niche proposition" crafted with "a great deal of love", offering an intimate and well-crafted exploration of Hong Kong's contemporary poetry scene, although she noted the "little acknowledgment of the realities of artistic freedom in contemporary Hong Kong", particularly regarding the intriguing choice of interviewees, Huang and Liu, who are neither residing in the city, a detail she found "tactfully" omitted from this "warm, but slightly meandering saunter" through the lives of Hong Kong poets.

Funscreen Weekly's Tara Huang focused her review on the film's subject matter, describing the filmmaking approach as "simplistic", while acknowledging that the themes are anything but, as it delves into the diminishing creative freedom of Hong Kong and the expansion of the diaspora, presenting a deeply intimate and meaningful documentary that "perfectly combines text, sound, and imagery", serving as both a personal reflection for the filmmaker and a poignant commentary on the city's political and cultural landscape amidst turmoil. Sean Gilman shared a similar perspective in his InReview article, describing the film as "a lament for a lost Hong Kong" that poignantly reflects the cultural loss and exile experienced after the 2019–2020 protests, mourning the city's unique role as a nexus between China and the wider world through an exploration of literary traditions while emphasising Hui's fears that Hong Kong's cultural momentum will be lost. Kitty Ip, reviewing for Sky Post, provided a different perspective on the film's subject matter, highlighting its poignant exploration of contemporary poets during the COVID-19 pandemic and the challenges they face due to rising living costs, but also commending Ann Hui for her dedication to the project.

Wen Tien-hsiang, writing for Mirror Media, rated the film 90/100, calling it "the most sincere tale of Hong Kong" and appreciating how the documentary intertwines personal stories with broader cultural and political themes, capturing the essence of poetry and life in Hong Kong through well-structured interviews and footage that visualises the conversations and poetic imaginations. Jan Wong also remarked the film as "heartfelt" in his review for Sing Tao Daily, lauding its intimate portrayal of contemporary poets and their lives, along with Ann Hui's personal connection to the subject, which adds warmth and depth to the documentary, creating a rewarding experience for audiences. Eric Tsang of the Hong Kong Film Critics Society offered a rather negative review, criticising the film for focusing more on the daily lives of poets rather than their creative insights. He argued that this approach fails to enhance viewers' understanding of contemporary poetry and highlighted issues with the film's casual cinematography and editing, as well as its lack of comprehensive coverage of notable poets.

== Awards and nominations ==
Year	Award	Category	Nominee	Result	Ref.
2023	60th Golden Horse Awards	Best Documentary Feature	—N/a	Nominated	
2024	30th Hong Kong Film Critics Society Awards	Film of Merit	—N/a	Won	
