= Stonewalling (film) =

2022 film

- Theatrical release poster

Chinese name
- Chinese: 石門
- Literal meaning: stone gate
Transcriptions
Standard Mandarin
- Hanyu Pinyin: shí mén
- Directed by: Huang Ji; Ryuji Otsuka
- Written by: Huang Ji; Ryuji Otsuka
- Produced by: Ryuji Otsuka
- Starring: Yao Honggui
- Cinematography: Ryuji Otsuka
- Edited by: Liao Ching-sung; Ryuji Otsuka; Du Men
- Music by: Ng Chor Guan
- Production company: YGP-FILM LLC
- Release date: 1 September 2022 (Venice)
- Running time: 148 minutes
- Country: Japan
- Languages: Mandarin; Hunanese

Stonewalling (Chinese: 石門, romanized: shí mén, lit. 'stone gate') is a 2022 Japanese independent drama film written and directed by Huang Ji and Ryuji Otsuka. Although shot in China, the film is classified as a Japanese production. It is the third and final film in a trilogy that includes Egg and Stone (2012) and The Foolish Bird (2017), films which depict young womanhood in contemporary China. The film stars Yao Honggui, who also appeared in the first two films, as a young Chinese woman struggling with an unexpected pregnancy.

It had its world premiere in the Giornate degli Autori section at the 79th Venice International Film Festival on 1 September 2022. It won Best Narrative Feature at the 60th Golden Horse Awards.

== Plot ==
Lynn is a 20-year-old woman in Changsha, capital of Hunan province. While balancing English classes with her flight attendant training course, she struggles to find meaningful work. She scrapes by through odd jobs in China's unreliable gig economy, including modeling cheap clothing and jewelry. She lives in a hotel with her boyfriend Zhang, an aspiring influencer on TikTok who earns a living hosting parties and modeling. While Lynn appears at ease with her local setting, Zhang has larger ambitions to leave altogether and move to the United Kingdom.

Lynn is forced to send what little money she has left to her parents, who live back in her hometown, to help them with their mounting debt. Her mother owns a small private women's clinic of an ethically dubious nature. However, her mother's attention increasingly turns to a pyramid scheme selling "Vital Cream". When medical malpractice in their clinic results in a patient's miscarriage, the family runs into financial trouble. To help her parents pay off the victim's compensation, Lynn contemplates selling her eggs on the black market. She visits an illegal fertility clinic, where she discovers she is pregnant. Zhang demands that she have an abortion, but Lynn resists and lies to him instead. Lynn then decides to pause her studies in Changsha and leave her boyfriend, returning home to live in her parents' cramped apartment. Lynn conceives a plan to give birth and sell the baby to the young woman who suffered a miscarriage in exchange for dropping her malpractice suit and clearing up her mother's debt.

== Cast ==
- Yao Honggui as Lynn
- Liu Long as Zhang
- Zilong Xiao
- Xiaoxiong Huang
- Liu Gang

== Production ==
=== Background and development ===
Husband-and-wife duo Ryuji Otsuka and Huang Ji are filmmakers based in Japan. Stonewalling is the third and final film in a trilogy that includes Egg and Stone (2012) and The Foolish Bird (2017), films which depict the hardships and sexuality of young women in contemporary China. Stonewalling focuses on the passage of time and changes in the body and mind of a young woman as depicted through pregnancy. The film began as an artistic answer to a question the duo's daughter asked Huang: "Why did you give birth to me?" The film evolved over time and the ending was completely changed due to the COVID-19 pandemic. It was produced by Otsuka through their own company Yellow-Green Pi.

The film stars Yao Honggui, who also appeared in the first two films, and was tailored to reflect Honggui's own bodily experiences during production. At the time of production, Honggui had moved from her home in rural Hunan to study at a university in the provincial capital, Changsha. Huang and Otsuka interviewed several young women in Changsha who similarly had moved from rural Hunan to study at a university in Changsha. Their research focused on the students' lifestyle, including their spending habits, financial security and their part-time work situation. The students were also questioned about their relationship with their parents and intimate partners. Huang and Otsuka wanted to examine contemporary social phenomena in urban China, including the increasing gig economy and grey markets, with a spotlight on influencer culture on platforms such as TikTok and viral news stories about egg donation and surrogacy. Similar to Honggui, the entire cast is composed of nonprofessional actors.

Huang has explained that their motivation with Stonewalling was to bring attention to "the plight of young women who have not been blessed with a good education" and "their struggles in finding their place in a rapidly changing society."

The film's title in Chinese translates to "stone gate". The English title was suggested to the directors by one of their student interviewees. Otsuka explained that the original title "feels too hard and cold. The verb in present continuous – "walling" – made the title softer. It corresponds with Lynn's state of mind and heart as she goes through changes."

=== Filming ===
Stonewalling was primarily shot in a small town in Hunan, in the clinic of Huang Ji's parents, who appear in the film as Lynn's parents. The pair also shot scenes in Changsha to reflect Lynn's "adult circumstances and need for work". The film was shot a small budget, with a crew consisting of three people. The film was shot between 2019 and 2020 over the course of 10 months, which was a conscious choice on behalf of the directors to mimic the gestation period of a pregnancy. The film took a total of three years to complete and was challenged by the COVID-19 pandemic. Otsuka also served as director of photography and production designer. Although shot in China, the film is classified as a Japanese production. Post-production was conducted outside China.

== Release ==
Stonewalling was selected to be screened in the Giornate degli Autori section at the 79th Venice International Film Festival, where it had its world premiere on 1 September 2022.

It was also selected to be screened in the Contemporary World Cinema section at the 47th Toronto International Film Festival, where the film had its North American premiere on 12 September 2022. It was also selected in the Main Slate of the 60th New York Film Festival. In September 2022, KimStim acquired the North American distribution rights. KimStim released the film in a limited theatrical release in the United States beginning on 10 March 2023 at the Film at Lincoln Center.

World sales are handled by the Hong Kong International Film Festival Collection (HKIFF Collection).

== Reception ==
=== Critical response ===
On Rotten Tomatoes, the film holds an approval rating of 95% based on 19 reviews, with an average rating of 7.3/10. On Metacritic, the film has a weighted average score of 84 out of 100, based on 8 critic reviews, indicating "universal acclaim". The film was named one of the best movies of 2023 by Manohla Dargis of The New York Times.

=== Accolades ===
Award	Date of ceremony	Category	Recipient(s)	Result	Ref.
Golden Horse Awards	25 November 2023	Best Narrative Feature	Stonewalling	Won	
Golden Horse Awards	25 November 2023	Best Film Editing	Liao Ching-sung and Ryuji Otsuka	Won	
Golden Horse Awards	25 November 2023	Best Director	Huang Ji and Ryuji Otsuka	Nominated	
Golden Horse Awards	25 November 2023	Best Original Screenplay	Huang Ji and Ryuji Otsuka	Nominated	
Hong Kong International Film Festival	10 April 2023	Firebird Award – Young Cinema Competition (Chinese Language)	Stonewalling	Won	
Hong Kong International Film Festival	10 April 2023	Best Actress – Young Cinema Competition (Chinese Language)	Yao Honggui and Xiaoxiong Huang	Won	
Hong Kong International Film Festival	10 April 2023	FIPRESCI Prize	Stonewalling	Won	
Jeonju International Film Festival	3 May 2023	NETPAC Award	Stonewalling	Won	
New Horizons Film Festival	30 July 2023	Grand Prix	Stonewalling	Nominated	
Tokyo FILMeX	6 November 2022	Grand Prize	Stonewalling	Nominated	
Venice Film Festival	10 September 2022	Europa Cinemas Label Award – Giornate degli Autori	Stonewalling	Nominated	
World Film Festival of Bangkok	12 December 2022	Lotus Award for Best Film	Stonewalling	Nominated	
World Film Festival of Bangkok	12 December 2022	Special Jury Prize for Best Screenplay	Huang Ji and Ryuji Otsuka	Won	
