= To Be Continued (2023 film) =

Hong Kong documentary

- Directed by: Dora Choi; Haider Kikabhoy
- Produced by: Hong Kong Community Heritage Foundation; Walk in Hong Kong Limited
- Cinematography: Cheng Wo Hing; Cheuk Yu Hang
- Edited by: Huang Yuk Kwok
- Music by: Arnold Fang
- Distributed by: Hong Kong Community Heritage Foundation
- Release dates: April 2, 2023 (HKIFF); April 19, 2023 (Hong Kong)
- Running time: 77 minutes
- Country: Hong Kong
- Languages: Cantonese; English

To Be Continued (Chinese: 尚未完場), co-directed by Dora Choi and Haider Kikabhoy, is a 2023 Hong Kong documentary about the impresario Harry Odell.

The film premiered at the 47th Hong Kong International Film Festival in 2023. It was named a 'Film of Merit' at the 30th Hong Kong Film Critics Society Awards in 2024.

== Synopsis ==
The film began with the 2016 grassroots campaign to save Hong Kong's State Theatre from demolition. Haider Kikabhoy, co-director of "To Be Continued", was among the campaigners. Their efforts turned into a journey to uncover the legacy of Harry Odell, a stockbroker-turned-showman who founded Empire Theatre – the original incarnation of State Theatre – in 1952. Odell was credited with bringing world-class artists such as Issac Stern, Xavier Cugat, The Beatles, Ravi Shankar and The Carpenters to Hong Kong as he stamped his mark on the city’s post-war cultural landscape. "To Be Continued" chronicles Kikabhoy's search for Odell’s story.

The film interweaves two parallel storylines: Odell's pursuit of his cultural enterprise and Kikabhoy's quest to piece together his life. The writer Fionnuala McHugh said the film is "the story of one passion project that gave birth to another." This journey includes insights from Odell's family members, recollections from diva Rebecca Pan, and commentary from experts including Hong Kong pop culture scholar Ng Chun Hung, music historian Oliver Chou, and military historian Kwong Chi Man (Odell, a Russian Jew born in Cairo, was with the US Army in France in the First World War and fought for Hong Kong in the Second World War before he was captured by the Japanese), along with memories from Odell's former colleagues.

== Release ==
Following its world premiere at the 47th Hong Kong International Film Festival held in the Hong Kong City Hall on 2 April 2023, To Be Continued was shown at local cinemas Golden Scene, Broadway Cinematheque and M+. The film earned festival selections including the 2024 Hong Kong Film Festival of Paris, 2025 Asian Pop-up Cinema in Chicago and 2025 CAAMFest in San Francisco.

== Reception ==
Writing in the Post Magazine of the South China Morning Post, Fionnuala McHugh called To Be Continued "an irresistible love letter to the city -- informative, funny, nostalgic and unexpectedly touching." Elizabeth Kerr, reviewing for Kai-Fong, dubbed the film "a low-budget, labour-of-love doc about a dead impresario and his theatre" that became Hong Kong cinema's "summer sleeper" of 2023.

French critic Richard Guerry noted that "nostalgia, the exaltation of discovery, and pathos often take precedence over documentation." He said that the directors "cannot hide their wonder at the symbols of this bygone era, and even more so for Harry Odell, whose idealized figure sometimes leads to confusion." Guerry found the film "perhaps more fascinating when the image is focused on the places, the poetics of the remains and the passage of time, on the material and permanent traces of this room full of history(ies)."

In Hong Kong's Chinese-language media, the film earned positive reviews from movie and pop culture critics in Sunday Ming Pao, HK01, AM730, and Madame Figaro.

== Beyond the film ==
Inspired by their work on To Be Continued, Choi and Kikabhoy have been running a series of workshops and activities to promote family history writing in Hong Kong since 2024.
