= Astrakan =

- Directed by: David Depesseville
- Written by: David Depesseville
- Produced by: Carole Chassaing; Anaïs Feuillette
- Starring: Mirko Giannini; Jehnny Beth; Bastien Bouillon
- Cinematography: Simon Beaufils
- Edited by: Martial Solomon
- Production company: Tamara Films
- Distributed by: Tamara Films
- Release date: 9 August 2022 (Locarno Film Festival)
- Running time: 105 minutes
- Country: France
- Language: French

Astrakan is a 2022 French coming-of-age drama film directed by David Depesseville, starring Mirko Giannini, Jehnny Beth and Bastien Bouillon.

== Cast ==
- Mirko Giannini as Samuel
- Jehnny Beth as Marie
- Bastien Bouillon as Clément
- Theo Costa-Marini as Luc
- Lorine Delin as Helene
- Cameron Bertrand
- Nathaël Bertrand

== Reception ==
Neil Young of Screen Daily called the film an "engrossing exercise in empathetic humanism, unhurried and uninflected".

Georgia Del Don of Cineuropa wrote that the film is "far more" than a "precise account of the ambiguous and vertiginous time marking the transition from childhood to adolescence."

Martin Kudlac of ScreenAnarchy wrote that despite the film being a "social allegory disguised as a coming-of-age tale imbued with the latent cringe cruelty of Todd Solondz's poetics", the film "works" as a "concentrated representation of the agony and confusion of growing up."
