= Lila Avilés =

Mexican director, screenwriter and actress (born 1982)

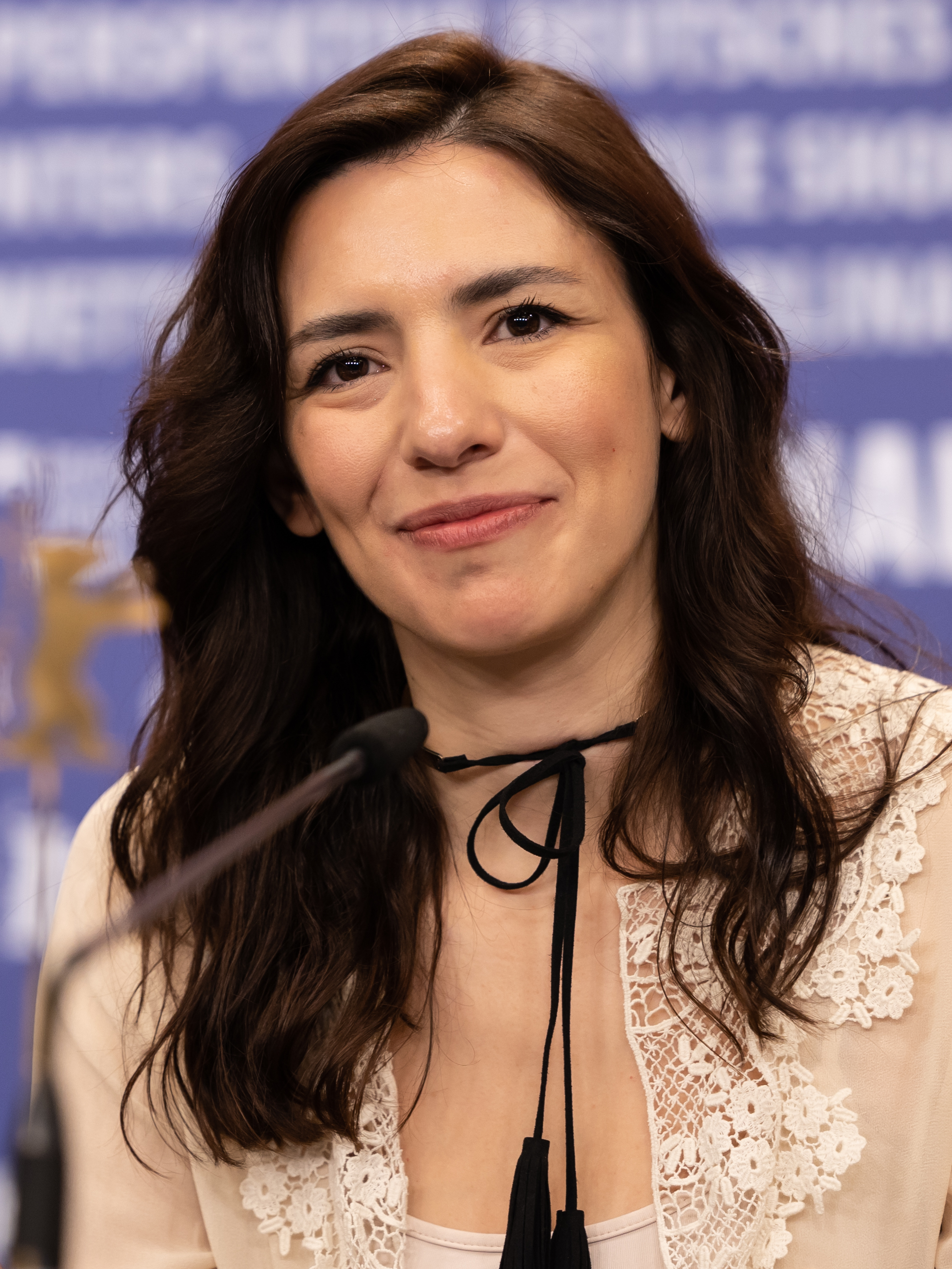
- Avilés at the 73rd Berlin International Film Festival (2023)
- Born: 1982 (age 43–44); Mexico City, Mexico
- Occupations: Filmmaker screenwriter

Lila Avilés (born in 1982) is a Mexican film director, screenwriter, actress and producer.

== Life and career ==
Born in Mexico City, Avilés studied scenic arts with Ximena Escalante and José Caballero, and film scriptwriting with Beatriz Novaro and Paula Marcovich. After directing some shorts, she made her feature film debut in 2018 with The Chambermaid, which premiered at the 43rd Toronto International Film Festival. With this film, Avilés won the Ariel Award for Best Debut Work, and got a nomination for Best Director. The film was also chosen as the Mexican entry for the Best International Feature Film at the 92nd Academy Awards.

Avilés's second feature film, Tótem, was entered into the main competition at the 2023 Berlin International Film Festival, where it won the Ecumenical Award for Best Film. For her film, she also won the Best Director award at the 2023 Jerusalem Film Festival. It was also selected for the Academy Award for Best International Feature Film at the 96th Academy Awards.

Also in 2023, Avilés shot Eye Two Times Mouth, a chapter of Miu Miu's short film anthology series Women's Tales.

In March 2024, to commemorate the 65th anniversary of International Women's Day, Avilés was one of a number of female celebrities had their likeness turned into Barbie dolls.

== Filmography ==
Year	English Title	Original Title	Notes
2018	The Chambermaid	La camarista	
2023	Tótem		
TBA	Cábula		Post-production
