= The Chambermaid (film) =

2018 film

The Chambermaid (La Camarista)
- Promotional release poster
- Directed by: Lila Avilés
- Starring: Gabriela Cartol
- Release date: 8 September 2018 (TIFF)
- Running time: 102 minutes
- Country: Mexico
- Language: Spanish
- Box office: $165,193

The Chambermaid (Spanish: La camarista) is a 2018 Mexican drama film directed by Lila Avilés. It was selected as the Mexican entry for the Best International Feature Film at the 92nd Academy Awards, but it was not nominated. Working at an upscale Mexican hotel, a maid seeks to find her place in the world.

== Plot ==
Eve is a reserved young woman working as a maid in an upscale hotel in Mexico City. Her boss tells her that because of her good work she might soon be eligible for a promotion, cleaning one of the more exclusive floors.

One of her male co-workers asks her to look on a guest who requested a woman specifically. The guest turns out to be an overwhelmed mother who asks Eve to watch her baby while she showers. Eve begins helping the woman once a day, reluctantly growing closer to both the guest and her baby. The guest is from Argentina and at one point suggests Eve to move back with her, however returning one day Eve discovers that the woman has abruptly left.

Eve takes GED classes offered by the hotel. Initially shy, she befriends one of her classmates, Minitoy, who encourages her to open up and have fun. Eve begins to depend on Minitoy to help her. Eve's teacher gives her a copy of Jonathan Livingston Seagull by Richard Bach and she begins reading for pleasure for the first time.

A window cleaner keeps making advances towards Eve but she repeatedly ignores him. After opening up to others, she decides to seduce him one day. While she is inside cleaning a room and he is outside cleaning a window, she strips down and masturbates in front of him.

Things begin to go wrong for Eve. The GED class is shut down. The window cleaner ignores her. She finally receives news that a red dress left behind by a guest is finally hers, but when she goes to collect it, she learns that Minitoy has received the promotion she longed for.

Eve goes to the 42nd floor, the site of Minitoy's promotion, and examines the private suite. Then she leaves the hotel with her luggage, hinting that she has quit.

== Cast ==
- Gabriela Cartol as Eve
- Agustina Quinci as Romina
- Teresa Sánchez as Minitoy

== Production ==
In an interview with La Elements, director Lila Avilés says that the ideal for the film stems from a time in the early 2010s in which she was writing a theater screenplay that also took place in a hotel. The play lasted for 3 months and during that time she decided she wanted to film there. She started interviewing chambermaids and continued to do so ever since. In her words, "So in every place I'd go, other hotels in Mexico, I was the interview girl."

== Reception ==
The Chambermaid has an approval rating of 99% on review aggregator website Rotten Tomatoes, based on 69 reviews, and an average rating of 7.9/10. The website's critical consensus states: "The Chambermaid uses one woman's experiences to take audiences inside a life -- and a culture -- that's as bracingly unique as it is hauntingly relatable". The only negative review on the site claims that the film is, "nearly devoid of drama". On Metacritic, The Chambermaid holds an 81/100 average on 12 reviews, which indicates 'Universal Acclaim'.

=== Cultural Reception ===
In accurate depiction of the concept of Shabbat observance is conveyed in the movie. In an early encounter, an observant Jewish guest asks Eve to press the elevator button for him because he cannot operate it on Shabbat.

=== Awards ===
Year	Award	Category	Recipient(s)	Result	Ref.
2020	Platino Awards	Platino Award for Best First Feature Film	Lila Aviles	Won	

== See also ==
- List of submissions to the 92nd Academy Awards for Best International Feature Film
- List of Mexican submissions for the Academy Award for Best International Feature Film
