= Mad Fate =

2023 Hong Kong film by Soi Cheang

- Theatrical release poster
- Traditional Chinese: 命案
- Simplified Chinese: 命案
- Hanyu Pinyin: Mìng Àn
- Jyutping: Ming6 Ngon4
- Directed by: Soi Cheang
- Screenplay by: Yau Nai-hoi; Melvin Li
- Story by: Yau Nai-hoi; Au Kin-yee
- Produced by: Johnnie To; Yau Nai-hoi; Elaine Chu
- Starring: Gordon Lam; Lokman Yeung; Berg Ng; Ng Wing-sze; Peter Chan
- Cinematography: Cheng Siu-keung
- Edited by: David Richardson; Allen Leung
- Music by: Chung Chi-wing; Ben Cheung
- Production companies: MakerVille Company; Noble Castle Asia; Milkyway Image
- Distributed by: Golden Scene Company
- Release dates: 19 February 2023 (BIFF); 30 March 2023 (HKIFF); 20 April 2023 (Hong Kong)
- Running time: 108 minutes
- Country: Hong Kong
- Language: Cantonese
- Box office: US$1.5 million

Mad Fate (Chinese: 命案) is a 2023 Hong Kong mystery thriller film directed by Soi Cheang, produced by Milkyway Image, and stars Gordon Lam, Lokman Yeung, Berg Ng, Ng Wing-sze and Peter Chan. In addition to being the film's director, Cheang also served as a film's executive producer. The film followed a fortune-teller who crosses paths with a young man with a strong desire to commit murder and tries to change the latter's destiny.

Mad Fate made its world premiere at the 73rd Berlin International Film Festival on 19 February 2023 as a Berlinale Special. The film also opened the 47th Hong Kong International Film Festival on 30 March 2023 before its theatrical release in Hong Kong on 20 April 2023.

== Cast ==
- Gordon Lam as The Master (大師), a fortune-teller with an expertise in helping his clients cheat fate.
- Lokman Yeung as Siu-tung (少東), the son of cha chaan teng owners and has a strong desire to commit murder.
- Berg Ng as a veteran police inspector hot on Siu-tung's trail.
- Ng Wing-sze as the Prostitute (妓女), a prostitute who seeks help from The Master in order to avoid her fate of dying in an imminent stroke of misfortune.
- Peter Chan
- Ko Tin Lung as Siu-tung's father.
- Wong Ching-yan as a prostitute.
- Pancy Chan as a policewoman.

== Release ==
Mad Fate made its world premiere at the 73rd Berlin International Film Festival on 19 February 2023 as a Berlinale Special. It also made its Asian premier as one of the two opening films at the 47th Hong Kong International Film Festival on 30 March 2023, where director Cheang was also chosen as the Filmmaker In Focus. The film was later theatrically released in Hong Kong on 20 April 2023.

The film was showcased for its North American premiere at the 22nd New York Asian Film Festival in 'Hong Kong Panorama' section on 22 July 2023.

== Reception ==
=== Box office ===
Mad Fate topped the box office chart during its opening day in Hong Kong with gross of HK$450,000, beating out The Super Mario Bros. Movie, which grossed HK$370,000 that day. The film finished at No. 3 at the end of its opening weekend, grossing HK$2,962,028 (US$377,438) during its first four days of release. The film remained at No. 3 during its second weekend with a gross of HK$3,494,876 (US$445,229) while accumulating a total gross of HK$6,456,904 (US$822,577) by then. During its third weekend, the film grossed HK$2,306,888 (US$293,953), moving down to No. 4, while accumulating a total gross of HK$8,763,792(US$1,116,719) by then. The film remained at No. 4 on its fourth weekend grossing HK$1,233,621 (US$157,329), and have grossed a total of HK$10,000,114 (US$1,275,362) by then. On its fifth weekend, the film moved down to No. 5 with a gross of HK$735,519 (US$94,098), while having accumulated a total gross of HK$10,735,733 (US$1,373,470) by then The film moved down to No. 7 in its sixth weekend with a gross of HK$485,970 (US$62,035) while having grossed a total of HK$11,221,703 (US$1,432,490) by then. During its seventh weekend, the film came in at No. 9 with a gross of HK$212,081 (US$27,059), while accumulating a total gross of HK$11,433,784 (US$1,458,837) so far.

=== Critical response ===
On the review aggregator website Rotten Tomatoes, 89% of 9 critics' reviews are positive, with an average rating of 7.5/10.

Lee Marshall of Screen Daily praises Cheng Siu-keung's cinematography and Lokman Yeung's performance, while noting the film's tonal shifts. Edmund Lee of the South China Morning Post gave the film a score of 3.5/5 stars and praises its inspired premise and screenwriters Yau Nai-hoi and Melvin Li's clever use of coincidences.

== Awards and nominations ==
Award	Date of ceremony	Category	Recipient(s)	Result	Ref.
Hong Kong Film Awards	April 14, 2024	Best Film	Mad Fate	Nominated	
Hong Kong Film Awards	April 14, 2024	Best Director	Soi Cheang	Won	
Hong Kong Film Awards	April 14, 2024	Best Screenplay	Yau Nai-hoi, Melvin Li	Won	
Hong Kong Film Awards	April 14, 2024	Best Cinematography	Cheng Siu-keung, To Hung-mo	Nominated	
Hong Kong Film Awards	April 14, 2024	Best Editing	Allen Leung, David Richardson	Won	
Hong Kong Film Awards	April 14, 2024	Best Art Direction	Bruce Yu, Cat Leung	Nominated	
Hong Kong Film Awards	April 14, 2024	Best Costume & Make Up Design	Bruce Yu, Karen Yip	Nominated	
Hong Kong Film Awards	April 14, 2024	Best Action Choreography	Jack Wong Wai-leung	Nominated	
