= List of Hong Kong films of 1986 =

This article lists feature-length Hong Kong films released in 1986.

== Box office ==
The highest-grossing Hong Kong films released in 1986, by domestic box office gross revenue, are as follows:

Highest-grossing films released in 1986
Rank	Title	Domestic gross
1	A Better Tomorrow	HK$34,651,324
2	Millionaires Express	HK$28,122,275
3	Aces Go Places IV	HK$27,012,748
4	Lucky Stars Go Places	HK$23,109,809
5	Inspector Chocolate	HK$22,485,500
6	Martial Arts of Shaolin	HK$18,106,589
7	Peking Opera Blues	HK$17,559,357
8	Mr. Vampire II	HK$17,072,137
9	Where's Officer Tuba?	HK$16,822,229
10	My Family	HK$15,339,277

== Releases ==
Title	Director	Cast	Genre	Notes
1986
100 Ways to Murder Your Wife	Kenny Bee	Kenny Bee, Chow Yun-fat, Joey Wong	Comedy	
9 To 3	Zhong Guoren	Hung Cheong Cheung, Man-Man Chong, Wan-Yeung Chow		
Abracadabra	Peter Mak Tai Kit	Chen Chia-ling, Fennie Yue, Ann Bridgewater		
Aces Go Places 4	Ringo Lam	Sam Hui, Karl Maka, Sally Yeh	Action, adventure	
The Adventure of Little Hairy	Siao Lung	Yu Zhuo-yao, Xue Shujie, Shiu Cheuk-yiu		Chinese-Hong Kong co-production
Armour of God	Jackie Chan	Jackie Chan, Alan Tam, Rosamund Kwan		
A Better Tomorrow	John Woo	Chow Yun-fat, Ti Lung, Leslie Cheung	Crime	
A Book of Heroes	Kevin Chu	Yasuaki Kurata, Yukari Oshima, Hu Kua	Action comedy	Taiwanese-Hong Kong co-production
Devoted to You	Clifton Ko	Jacky Cheung, Loletta Lee, May Lo	Drama	
Dream Lovers	Tony Au	Chow Yun-fat, Brigitte Lin, Cher Yeung, Man-lei Wong	Romance, fantasy	
The Family Strikes Back	Dean Shek	Dean Shek, Gary Lim, Anglie-Leon Leung		
Ghost Snatchers	Ngai Choi Lam	Joey Wang, Wai-Man Chan, Charlie Cho		
Goodbye Mammie	David Lam	Deanie Ip, Simon Yam, Louis Fan		
Happy Ghost III	Johnnie To, Raymond Wong Pak-ming	Raymond Wong Pak-ming, Maggie Cheung, Fennie Yuen		
A Hearty Response	Norman Law	Kent Cheng, Chow Yun Fat, Joey Wang	Thriller	
Heroes Shed No Tears	John Woo	Lam Ching-ying, Eddy Ko, Chen Yue-sang	Action	
Inspector Chocolate	Philip Chan	Michael Hui, Anita Mui, Ricky Hui, Sibelle Hu Hui-Chung, Sin Do-Laai, Cheng Mang-Ha, Maria Cordero, Annie Liu On-Lai, Sally Kwok, Lee Yuet-Ching		
The Last Emperor	Li Han-hsiang	Tony Leung Ka-fai, Pan Hong, Margaret Lee		Chinese-Hong Kong co-production
Last Song in Paris	Chor Yuen	Leslie Cheung, Anita Mui, Joey Wong, Cecilia Yip, Paul Chu Kong, Tin Ching, Charlie Cho Cha-Lee, Hung Nam, Hui Siu-Hung, Ho Pak-Kwong, Hon Lai-Fan, Hung San-Nam, Lee Man-Biu, Lau Siu-Kwan, Chow Shing-Boh, Jeng Man-Keung	Romance	
Legacy of Rage	Ronny Yu	Brandon Lee, Michael Wong, Michael Chan Wai-man	Action, thriller	
Love Unto Waste	Stanley Kwan	Tony Leung Chiu-Wai, Irene Wan, Elaine Jin		
Lucky Stars Go Places	Eric Tsang	Karl Maka, Alan Tam, Sammo Hung		
The Lunatics	Derek Yee	Shui-Fan Fung, Deannie Yip, Paul Chun	Drama	
The Magic Crystal	Wong Jing	Andy Lau, Cynthia Rothrock, Richard Norton	Action, adventure, comedy	
Martial Arts of Shaolin	Lau Kar-leung	Jet Li, Hu Jianqiang, Huang Qiuyan		
Millionaire's Express	Sammo Hung	Sammo Hung, Yuen Biao, Cynthia Rothrock	Action	
Mr. Vampire II	Ricky Lau	Lam Ching-ying, Yuen Biao, Moon Lee	Comedy, horror	
My Will, I Will	Jamie Luk	Chow Yun-fat, Carol Cheng, Bennett Pang		
Naughty Boys	Wellson Chin	Kara Hui, Carina Lau, Cheung Wing-fat	Crime comedy	
Nepal Affair	Ching Siu-tung	Chow Yun-fat, Yammie Lam, Emily Chu		
New Mr. Vampire	Bee Chan	Lu Fang, Wang Hsiao-feng, Chien Hsiao Ho	Horror	
No Retreat, No Surrender	Corey Yuen	Kurt McKinney, Jean-Claude Van Damme, J.W. Fails	Action	Hong Kong-American co-production
Peking Opera Blues	Tsui Hark	Brigitte Lin, Sally Yeh, Cherie Chung		
Righting Wrongs	Corey Yuen	Yuen Biao, Cynthia Rothrock, Melvin Wong	Action	
Rose	Yonfan	Chow Yun-fat, Maggie Cheung, Ha Ping		
Royal Warriors	David Chung	Michelle Yeoh, Hiroyuki Sanada, Michael Wong	Action	
The Seventh Curse	Nam Nai-choi	Maggie Cheung, Chow Yun-fat, Ken Boyle	Fantasy, horror	
Silent Love	David Chiang Da-Wei	Season Ma	Drama	
Soul	Shu Kei	Deanie Ip, Elaine Jin, Jacky Cheung		
The Story of Dr. Sun Yat Sen	Ting Shan Hsi	Lam Wai Sang, Alex Man, Pauline Wong		
Tongs: A Chinatown Story	Philip Chan	Simon Yam, Larry Tan, Anthony Gioia		
True Colours	Kirk Wong	Ti Lung, Raymond Wong, Brigitte Lin	Crime	
Where's Officer Tuba?	Ricky Lau, Philip Chan	Sammo Hung, David Chiang, Jacky Cheung		
