= Chow Yun-fat filmography =

Cataloging of performances by the Hong Kong actor

This article contains the filmography of Hong Kong actor Chow Yun-fat.

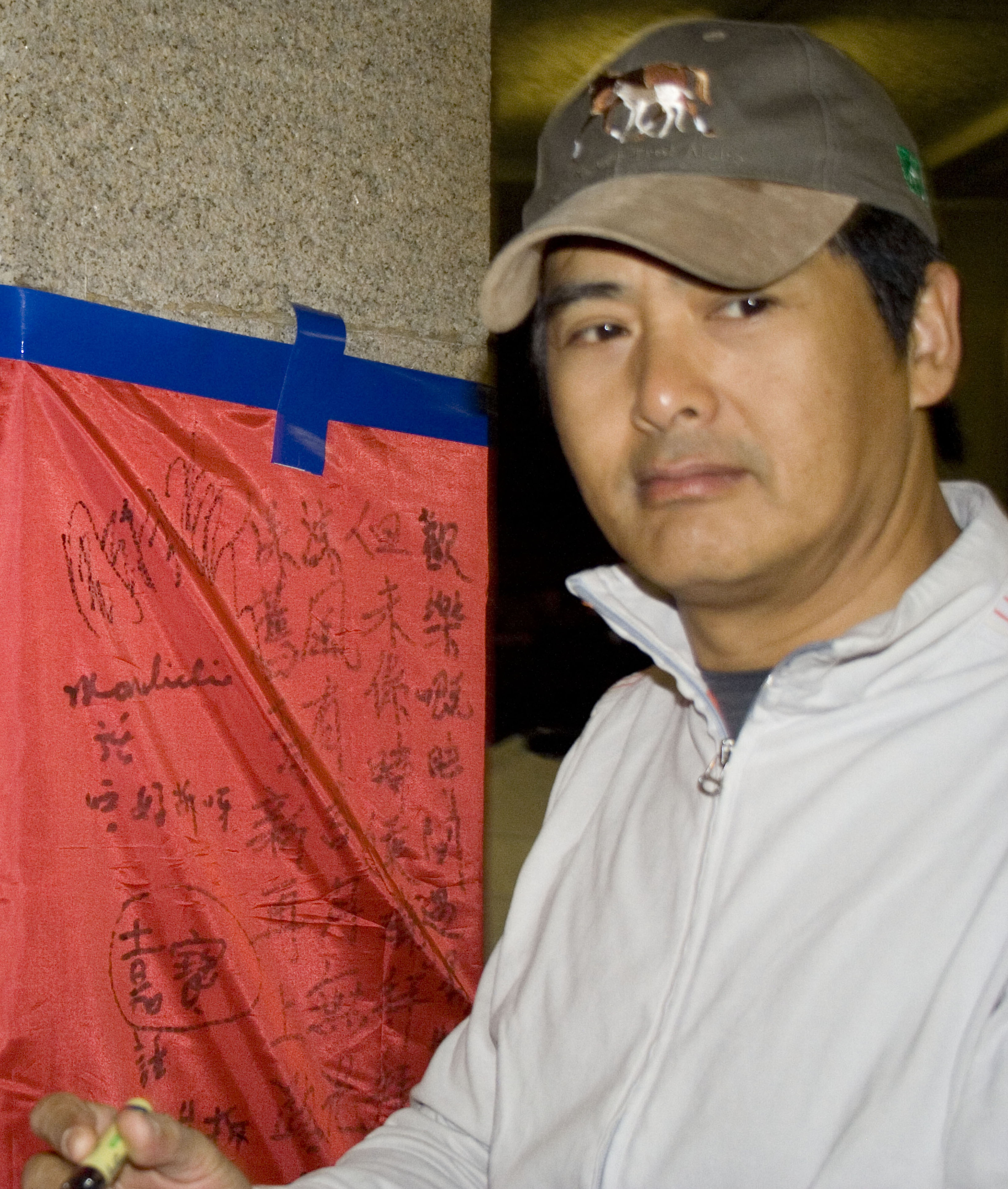
Chow in 2007

== Film ==
Year	Film title	Chinese	Role	Notes/Ref.
1976	Learned Bride Thrice Fools the Bridegroom	新蘇小妹三難新郎		Guest appearance
1976	The Hunter, the Butterfly and the Crocodile	撈家邪牌姑爺仔		
1976	Reincarnation	投胎人		
1976	Massage Girls	池女		
1977	Hot Blood	入冊	Ah Cheng	
1977	Bed for Day, Bed for Night	床上的故事		Guest appearance
1978	Miss "O"	O女	Kuan Yen-Ping	
1978	Their Private Lives	愛慾狂潮	Ko Ming-chung	
1980	See-Bar	師爸	Kit / Chieh	
1980	Pembunahan Pursuit	懵佬，大賊，傻偵探	Killer	
1980	Police Sir!	係咁先	Sergeant Chu Hwa-tai	
1980	Joy to the World	喜劇王	Yam Chung-lung	
1981	Soul Ash	灰靈	Zhou Runfa	
1981	The Executor	執法者	Ng Tao	Cameo
1981	The Story of Woo Viet	胡越的故事	Woo Viet	
1982	The Postman Strikes Back	巡城馬	Fu Jun	
1982	The Head Hunter	獵頭	Yuen Lik	
1983	Last Affair	花城	Kwong Ping	
1983	The Bund	上海灘	Hui Man-keung	
1983	The Bund Part II	上海灘續集	Hui Man-keung	
1983	Blood Money	血汗金錢	'Bullet'	
1983	Katanyu Prakasit			Thai film
1984	Love in a Fallen City	傾城之戀	Fan Liu-yuen	
1984	Hong Kong 1941	等待黎明	Yip Kim-fei	Golden Horse Award for Best Actor; Nominated—Hong Kong Film Award for Best Actor
1984	The Occupant	靈氣逼人	Inspector Valentino Chow	
1985	Women	女人心	Derek Sun	Nominated—Hong Kong Film Award for Best Actor
1985	Why Me?	何必有我?	Mr. Chow	
1986	Witch from Nepal	奇緣	Joe	
1986	Love Unto Waste	地下情	Inspector Lan	Nominated—Hong Kong Film Award for Best Supporting Actor
1986	Missed Date	初一十五	Peter	
1986	Dream Lovers	夢中人	Song Yu	
1986	A Better Tomorrow	英雄本色	Mark 'Gor' Lee	Hong Kong Film Award for Best Actor; Nominated—Golden Horse Award for Best Actor
1986	The Seventh Curse	原振俠與衛斯理	Wisely	
1986	Rose	玫瑰的故事	Charles / Ka-Ming	
1986	The Lunatics	癲佬正傳	Chung	
1986	100 Ways to Murder Your Wife	殺妻二人組	Fat	
1986	A Hearty Response	義蓋雲天	Ho Ting-pong	
1986	My Will, I Will	你情我願		
1987	City on Fire	龍虎風雲	Ko Chow	Hong Kong Film Award for Best Actor
1987	Spiritual Love	鬼新娘	Pu Yung-tsai	
1987	Flaming Brothers	江湖龍虎門	Cheung Ho-Tin	
1987	Scared Stiff	小生夢驚魂	Inspector Chow	
1987	An Autumn's Tale	秋天的童話	Samuel Pang	Golden Horse Award for Best Actor; Nominated—Hong Kong Film Award for Best Actor
1987	Rich and Famous	江湖情	Lee Ah-chai	
1987	Brotherhood	義本無言	Fai	
1987	Prison on Fire	監獄風雲	Chung Tin-ching	Nominated—Hong Kong Film Award for Best Actor
1987	Tragic Hero	英雄好漢	Lee Ah-chai	
1987	A Better Tomorrow II	英雄本色續集	Ken Lee	
1987	The Romancing Star	精裝追女仔	Fred Wong Yat-fat	
1988	City War	義膽紅唇	Dick Lee	
1988	Goodbye My Friend	再見英雄	Xiong	
1988	The Eighth Happiness	八星報喜	Fong Kim-long	
1988	Fractured Follies	長短腳之戀	Joe Leung	
1988	The Romancing Star II	精裝追女仔之2	Fred Wong Yat-fat / Big Mouth Fat	Cameo
1988	Tiger on the Beat	老虎出更	Sergeant Francis Li	
1988	The Greatest Lover	公子多情	Qian-Jin / Nelson Chow	
1988	Cherry Blossoms	郁達夫傳奇	Yu Ta-Fu (adult)	
1988	Diary of a Big Man	大丈夫日記	Chow Ting-fat	
1989	All About Ah-Long	阿郎的故事	Ah-Long	Hong Kong Film Award for Best Actor
1989	The Killer	喋血雙雄	Jong	
1989	A Better Tomorrow 3	英雄本色III夕陽之歌	Mark 'Gor' Lee	
1989	God of Gamblers	賭神	Ko Chun	Nominated—Hong Kong Film Award for Best Actor
1989	Triads: The Inside Story	我在黑社會的日子	Lee Man-ho	
1989	Wild Search	伴我闖天涯	Sergeant Lau Chun-pong	
1990	The Fun, the Luck & the Tycoon	吉星拱照	Lam Bo-sang / Stink	
1990	God of Gamblers II	賭俠	Ko Chun	Uncredited cameo
1991	Once a Thief	縱橫四海	Joe	Nominated—Hong Kong Film Award for Best Actor
1991	Prison on Fire II	監獄風雲II逃犯	Chung Tin-ching	
1992	Now You See Love, Now You Don't	我愛扭紋柴	Ng San-shui	
1992	Hard Boiled	辣手神探	Tequila Yuen	
1992	Full Contact	俠盜高飛	Jeff / Ko Fei	
1994	God of Gamblers Returns	賭神2	Ko Chun	
1994	Treasure Hunt	花旗少林	Jeffrey Cheung Ching	Nominated—Hong Kong Film Award for Best Actor
1995	Peace Hotel	和平飯店	Wong A-ping / killer	Nominated—Hong Kong Film Award for Best Actor
1998	The Replacement Killers		John Lee	
1999	The Corruptor		Lieutenant Nick Chen	
1999	Anna and the King	安娜与国王	King Mongkut	
2000	Crouching Tiger, Hidden Dragon	臥虎藏龍	Li Mu-bai	Nominated—Hong Kong Film Award for Best Actor
2003	Bulletproof Monk		Monk With No Name	
2005	Waiting Alone	独自等待	Ge Fa	Cameo
2006	The Postmodern Life of My Aunt	姨媽的後現代生活	Pan Zhichang	
2006	Curse of the Golden Flower	滿城盡帶黃金甲	Emperor Ping	Nominated—Hong Kong Film Award for Best Actor
2007	Pirates of the Caribbean: At World's End		Captain Sao Feng	
2008	The Children of Huang Shi	黄石的孩子	Chen Hansheng	
2009	Dragonball Evolution	龙珠进化	Muten Roshi	
2009	The Founding of a Republic	建國大業	Yuan Shikai	Cameo
2010	Confucius	孔子	Confucius	Nominated—Hong Kong Film Award for Best Actor
2010	Shanghai	諜海風雲	Anthony Lan-Ting	
2010	Let the Bullets Fly	讓子彈飛	Master Huang	
2011	The Founding of a Party	建黨偉業	Yuan Shikai	
2012	The Assassins	銅雀台	Cao Cao	
2012	The Last Tycoon	大上海	Cheng Daqi	
2014	From Vegas to Macau	賭城風雲	Ken Shek / Ko Chun	
2014	The Monkey King	大鬧天宮	Jade Emperor	
2015	From Vegas to Macau II	賭城風雲II	Ken Shek / Ko Chun	
2015	Office	華麗上班族	Ho Chung-ping	
2016	From Vegas to Macau III	賭城風雲III	Ken Shek / Ko Chun	
2016	Cold War 2	寒戰2	Oswald Kan	
2018	Project Gutenberg	無雙	Ng Fuk-sang / Painter	Nominated—Hong Kong Film Award for Best Actor
2023	One More Chance	別叫我“賭神”	Fai	
2025	Detective Chinatown 1900	唐探1900	Bai Xuanling	
2026	Cold War 1994	寒戰1994	Oswald Kan	

== Television ==
Year	Series title	Alternate	Role	Episodes	Notes
1975	Chinese Folklore: God of River Lok	民間傳奇系列：洛神			
1975	Chinese Folklore: Dream of the Red Chamber	民間傳奇系列：紅樓夢			
1975	Little Women				
1975	Broken Pieces	片斷			
1975	Beautiful Ladies				
1976	Seven Women				
1976	Lady Yang				
1976	Hotel	狂潮		128	a.k.a. Mad Tide, Raging Tides
1976	The Killer I	大江南北		20	a.k.a. Hitman 72 Hours
1976	The Itinerant Boy	江湖小子		20	a.k.a. The Vagabond
1977	A House Is Not a Home	家變		80	a.k.a. Family Change
1977	Thirteen - 4 - Suffocation				
1978	The Giants	強人		110	a.k.a. Powerful People
1978	Conflict	奮鬥		80	a.k.a. Ancient Battle
1978	Mystery Beyond				Chow appeared in 3 episodes
1978	Vanity Fair	大亨		85	
1978	The Heated Wave of Youth				
1979	The Good, the Bad and the Ugly	網中人	Ching Wai	80	a.k.a. Man in the Net
1979	Over the Rainbow	天虹		80	
1979	The Landlord	有樓收租		13	
1979	Man From Hong Kong			13	a.k.a. Dragon Lake Heroes
1979	When a Woman Is 30	女人三十			
1980	The Bund	上海灘	Hui Man-keung	25	a.k.a. Shanghai Tan a.k.a. Shanghai Beach
1980	The Brothers	親情		75	a.k.a. Family Feelings
1981	Seekers	前路		20	a.k.a. The Road Ahead
1981	Good Old Times	鱷魚潭		20	a.k.a. Alligator Pool
1981	The Shell Game II	千王群英會	Ah Long	20	
1981	The Fate	火鳳凰		20	a.k.a. Flaming Phoenix
1982	The Legend of Master So	蘇乞兒	So Chan	20	
1982	The Maverick	孤城客		20	
1983	The Radio Tycoon	播音人	Wai Yip-cheung	30	
1983	Angels and Devils	北斗雙雄	Yue Fan	20	
1983	The Superpower	天降財神	Tin Yat	20	
1984	The Smiling, Proud Wanderer	笑傲江湖	Linghu Chong	30	a.k.a. State of Divinity
1985	The Battle Among the Clans	大香港	Lok Chung-hing	26	a.k.a. Big Hong Kong
1985	Police Cadet '85	新紮師兄第 II		40	a.k.a. Police Cadet II
1986	The Yang's Saga	楊家將	Lu Dongbin, One of The Eight Immortals	6	
1987	Small and Alone in the World				
2025	The Miracles				

== Video games ==
Year	Title	Role
2003	Crouching Tiger, Hidden Dragon	Li Mu Bai
2007	Stranglehold	Tequila Yuen
