= 6th Hong Kong Film Awards =

1987 Hong Kong Film Awards

- Date: 24 April 1987
- Hosted by: Carol Cheng and Chung King-fai

The 6th Hong Kong Film Awards ceremony, honored the best films of 1986 and took place on 24 April 1987 at Hong Kong Baptist University, Academic Community Hall, Kowloon Tong, Hong Kong. The ceremony was hosted by Carol Cheng and Chung King-fai, during the ceremony awards are presented in 14 categories. The ceremony was sponsored by City Entertainment Magazine.

== Awards ==
Winners are listed first, highlighted in boldface, and indicated with a double dagger (‡).

**Best Film**: **A Better Tomorrow**‡; The Last Emperor; Brotherhood; Love Unto Waste; Just Like Weather; The Lunatics	**Best Director**: **Allen Fong — Just Like Weather**‡; John Woo — A Better Tomorrow; Han Hsiang Li — The Last Emperor; Stephen Shin — Brotherhood; Derek Yee — The Lunatics; Stanley Kwan — Love Unto Waste
**Best Actor**: **Chow Yun Fat — A Better Tomorrow**‡; Danny Lee — Brotherhood; Ti Lung — A Better Tomorrow; Michael Hui — Chocolate Inspector; Tony Leung Ka Fai — The Last Emperor; Tony Leung Chiu Wai — Love Unto Waste	**Best Actress**: **Sylvia Chang — Passion**‡; Christine Lee Yuk-Kuen — Just Like Weather; Ma Si-San — Silent Love; Pan Hong — The Last Emperor; Sally Yeh — Peking Opera Blues
**Best Supporting Actor**: **Paul Chun — The Lunatics**‡; Waise Lee — A Better Tomorrow; Wu Ma — Righting Wrongs; Paul Chun — Peking Opera Blues; Chow Yun Fat — Love Unto Waste; Shing Fui-On — The Law Enforcer	**Best Supporting Actress**: **Elaine Jin — Love Unto Waste**‡; Chin Tsai — Love Unto Waste; Cher Yeung — Dream Lovers; Margaret Lee Din-Long — The Last Emperor; Lee Din-Hing — The Last Emperor
**Best New Performer**: **Yuk Guen Lee — Just Like Weather**‡; Waise Lee — A Better Tomorrow; Brandon Lee — Legacy of Rage; Anthony Wong — Kiss Me Goodbye	**Best Screenplay**: **Kit Lai and Yau-tai On-ping — Love Unto Waste**‡; Chong Chau Ng — Just Like Weather; John Woo — A Better Tomorrow; Michael Hui and Philip Chan — Chocolate Inspector; Derek Yee — The Lunatics; Hing Cheung Wong and Qi Yue Cheung — The Last Emperor
**Best Cinematography**: **Christopher Doyle — Soul**‡; Wing-hang Wong — A Better Tomorrow; Bill Wong — Dream Lovers; Hang-Sang Poon — Peking Opera Blues; Lok-Yee Chan and Bing-Lam Chan — Just Like Weather	**Best Film Editing**: **Yuk Wai Lee and Keung Kwok — Just Like Weather**‡; Ma Kam — A Better Tomorrow; David Wu — Peking Opera Blues; Peter Cheung — Witch from Nepal; Kwok Kuen Cheung — Passion
**Best Art Direction**: **Yank Wong — The Lunatics**‡; William Chang — Dream Lovers; Zui ai — Passion; Chi Leung Lui — A Better Tomorrow; Vincent Wai, Kim-Sing Ho and Chi-Hing Leung — Peking Opera Blues; James Leung — Witch from Nepal	**Best Action Direction**: **Siu-Tung Ching, Philip Kwok, Alan Chui Chung-San and Lau Chi Ho — Witch from Nepal**‡; Corey Yuen, Yuen Biao, Mang Hoi and Tsui Hark — Righting Wrongs; Siu-Tung Ching — Peking Opera Blues; Mang Hoi — Royal Warriors; The Liu Clan — Martial Arts of Shaolin; Sammo Hung's Stuntman Association — Twinkle Twinkle Lucky Stars
**Best Original Film Score**: **Wing-fai Law — Dream Lovers**‡; Wing-fai Law — Just Like Weather; Lowell Lo — Passion; Man Yee Lam — Love Unto War; Ka-Fai Koo — A Better Tomorrow	**Best Original Film Song**: **Composer: Lowell Lo Koon-Ting • Lyrics: Poon Yuen-Leung** **• Singer: George Lam — Passion**‡; Composer/Lyrics: Law Tai-Yau • • Singer: Jenny Yan Nei — Seung Hoi Fa; Composer: Lam Man-Yi • Lyrics: Cheng Kwok-Kong • Singer: George Lam Chi-Cheung — Lost Romance; Composer: Lam Man-Yi • Lyrics: Poon Yuen-Leung and Lam Chun-Keung • Singer: So Noi and Ha Siu-Seng — Millionaire's Express; Composer: Lam Man-Yi • Lyrics: Fong Wai-Kwong • Singer: Choi Kam — Love Unto Waste
