= 36 Crazy Fists =

36 Crazy Fists may refer to:

- The 36 Crazy Fists, a 1977 martial arts movie
- 36 Crazyfists, an American rock band
