= List of fantasy films of the 1980s =

A list of fantasy films released in the 1980s.

== List ==
Title	Director	Cast	Country	Notes
1980
Return of the King	Jules Bass, Arthur Rankin Jr.	Orson Bean, John Huston, Roddy McDowall	United States	Television movie, animated film
Xanadu	Robert Greenwald	Olivia Newton-John, Gene Kelly, Michael Beck, Sandahl Bergman	United States	
Dumbrava minunată (film)	Gheorghe Naghi	Diana Muscă, Ernest Maftei, Elena Drăgoi	Romania	
Hawk the Slayer	Terry Marcel	Jack Palance, John Terry, Bernard Bresslaw, Patricia Quinn, W. Morgan Sheppard	United States; United Kingdom	
1981
The Archer: Fugitive from the Empire	Nicholas Corea	Lane Caudell, Belinda Bauer, Victor Campos, Kabir Bedi, George Kennedy	United States	German: de:Der Zauberbogen
Clash of the Titans	Desmond Davis	Laurence Olivier, Harry Hamlin, Claire Bloom, Maggie Smith, Burgess Meredith, Ursula Andress, Neil McCarthy, Judi Bowker, Neil McCarthy, Siân Phillips	United Kingdom; United States	
Dragonslayer	Matthew Robbins	Peter MacNicol, Caitlin Clarke, Ian McDiarmid, Ralph Richardson, John Hallam, Peter Eyre, Albert Salmi	United Kingdom	
Excalibur	John Boorman	Liam Neeson, Patrick Stewart, Gabriel Byrne, Helen Mirren, Nicol Williamson, Nigel Terry, Nicholas Clay, Cherie Lunghi	United Kingdom	
Heavy Metal	Gerald Potterton	John Candy, Eugene Levy, John Vernon, Richard Romanus	Canada	Animated film
Time Bandits	Terry Gilliam	John Cleese, Sean Connery, Shelley Duvall, Ian Holm, Kenny Baker, Jim Broadbent, Derrick O'Connor, Ralph Richardson, Katherine Helmond, Ralph Richardson, Peter Vaughan, David Rappaport, David Warner	United Kingdom	
Maria, Mirabela	Ion Popescu-Gopo	Gilda Manolescu, Medeea Marinescu, Ingrid Celia	Romania, Soviet Union	Live-action/animated film
1982
Along Unknown Paths (ru)	Mikhail Yuzovsky	Tatyana Peltzer, Aleksandr Filippenko, Tatyana Aksyuta	Soviet Union	
Ator the Fighting Eagle	Joe D'Amato	Miles O'Keeffe, Sabrina Siani, Ritza Brown	Italy	
The Beastmaster	Don Coscarelli	Marc Singer, Tanya Roberts, Rip Torn, John Amos, Rod Loomis, Ralph Strait, Billy Jayne, Joshua Milrad	United States	
Conan the Barbarian	John Milius	Arnold Schwarzenegger, James Earl Jones, Max von Sydow, Sandahl Bergman, Mako, Franco Columbu, Sven-Ole Thorsen	United States	
The Dark Crystal	Jim Henson	Frank Oz, Kathryn Mullen, Dave Goelz, Steve Whitmire, Louise Gold, Mike Quinn	United States; United Kingdom	
E.T. the Extra-Terrestrial	Steven Spielberg	Dee Wallace, Peter Coyote, Henry Thomas	United States	Science fantasy
The Flight of Dragons	Jules Bass,	John Ritter, James Earl Jones, Arthur Rankin Jr., Victor Buono, Harry Morgan, Larry Storch, Ed Peck, Nellie Bellflower,	United States	Television movie, Animated film
Forbidden Zone	Richard Elfman	Hervé Villechaize, Susan Tyrrell	United States	Absurdist comedy
The Last Unicorn	Jules Bass	Jeff Bridges, Mia Farrow, Angela Lansbury, Alan Arkin, Arthur Rankin Jr., Tammy Grimes, Robert Klein, Christopher Lee, Nellie Bellflower, Keenan Wynn	United States	Animated film
The Secret of NIMH	Don Bluth	Hermione Baddeley, John Carradine, Tom Hatten, Dom DeLuise, Wil Wheaton, Elizabeth Hartman, Derek Jacobi, Arthur Malet, Shannen Doherty, Paul Shenar, Peter Strauss	United States	Animated film
Sorceress	Jack Hill	Leigh Harris, Lynette Harris, Roberto Harris, David Millbern, Bruno Rey	United States; Mexico	
The Sword and the Sorcerer	Albert Pyun	Lee Horsley, Kathleen Beller, Simon MacCorkindale, George Maharis, Richard Lynch	United States	
1983
Conquest	Lucio Fulci	Jorge Rivero, Andrea Occhipinti, Sabrina Siani	Italy; Mexico; Spain	
Deathstalker	James Sbardellati	Richard Hill, Barbi Benton, Richard Brooker	United States	
Fire and Ice	Ralph Bakshi	Randy Norton, Cynthea Leake	United States	Animated film
Hercules	Luigi Cozzi	Lou Ferrigno, Sybil Danning, Brad Harris, Rossana Podesta, Mirella D'Angelo, William Berger, Eva Robin's	Italy, United States	
Krull	Peter Yates	Ken Marshall, Liam Neeson, Lysette Anthony, Freddie Jones, Robbie Coltrane, Bernard Bresslaw	United States; United Kingdom	
Legend of the Eight Samurai	Kinji Fukasaku	Hiroko Yakushimaru, Hiroyuki Sanada, Sonny Chiba	Japan	
The Man Who Wasn't There	Bruce Malmuth	Steve Guttenberg, Jeffrey Tambor, Lisa Langlois	United States	
Mary Poppins, Goodbye	Leonid Kvinikhidze	Natalya Andrejchenko, Albert Filozov, Lembit Ulfsak	Soviet Union	
Sorcerers	Konstantin Bromberg	Aleksandra Yakovleva, Aleksandr Abdulov, Yekaterina Vasilyeva, Valentin Gaft	Soviet Union	
Thor the Conqueror	Tonino Ricci, Anthony Richmond	Conrad Nichols, Christopher Holm, Maria Romano	Italy	
Zu Warriors	Tsui Hark	Yuen Biao	Hong Kong	
1984
All of Me	Carl Reiner	Steve Martin, Lily Tomlin, Victoria Tennant, Richard Libertini	United States	
Ator 2 - L'invincibile Orion	Joe D'Amato	Miles O'Keeffe, Lisa Foster, Charles Borromel	Italy	
The Company of Wolves	Neil Jordan	Sarah Patterson, Angela Lansbury, David Warner, Stephen Rea	United Kingdom	
Conan the Destroyer	Richard Fleischer	Arnold Schwarzenegger, Grace Jones, Wilt Chamberlain	United States	
A Fairy Tale of Wanderings	Alexander Mitta	Andrei Mironov, Tatiana Aksyuta	Soviet Union	
Formula of Love	Mark Zakharov	Nodar Mgaloblishvili, Aleksandr Abdulov, Semyon Farada	Soviet Union	
Ghostbusters	Ivan Reitman	Bill Murray, Dan Aykroyd, Sigourney Weaver, Harold Ramis, Rick Moranis	United States	Science fantasy horror comedy
Gremlins	Joe Dante	Hoyt Axton, Keye Luke, Don Steele, Scott Brady, Zach Galligan	United States	
Nausicaä of the Valley of the Wind	Hayao Miyazaki		Japan	Anime film
The NeverEnding Story	Wolfgang Petersen	Noah Hathaway, Barret Oliver, Tami Stronach	West Germany; United Kingdom	
Ronia, the Robber's Daughter	Tage Danielsson	Hanna Zetterberg, Börje Ahlstedt, Lena Nyman	Sweden; Norway	
Sheena	John Guillermin	Tanya Roberts, Ted Wass, Donovan Scott	United States	
Splash	Ron Howard	Tom Hanks, Daryl Hannah, John Candy, Eugene Levy	United States	
Supergirl	Jeannot Szwarc	Faye Dunaway, Helen Slater, Hart Bochner, Peter O'Toole	United Kingdom	
Sword of the Valiant	Stephen Weeks	Miles O'Keeffe, Sean Connery, Cyrielle Clair, Trevor Howard, Peter Cushing, John Rhys-Davies	United Kingdom	
The Tale of Tsar Saltan	Ivan Ivanov-Vano, Lev Milchin		Soviet Union	Animated
The Warrior and the Sorceress	John C. Broderick	David Carradine, Luke Askew, Maria Socas	United States	
1985
The Adventures of Hercules	Luigi Cozzi	Lou Ferrigno, Milly Carlucci, Sonia Viviani, William Berger, Venantino Venantini, Eva Robin's	Italy, United States	
After the Rain, on Thursday (ru)	Mikhail Yuzovsky	Oleg Tabakov, Tatyana Peltzer, Semyon Farada, Georgi Millyar	Soviet Union	
Asterix Versus Caesar	Gaëtan Brizzi, Paul Brizzi		France	Animated
Barbarian Queen	Héctor Olivera	Lana Clarkson, Victor Bo, Dawn Dunlap	United States; Argentina	
The Black Cauldron	Ted Berman, Richard Rich	Grant Bardsley, Susan Sheridan, Nigel Hawthorne, Freddie Jones, Arthur Malet, Phil Fondacaro, John Hurt	United States	Animated film
The Dungeonmaster	Various	Jeffrey Byron, Richard Moll, Leslie Wing	United States	
Ladyhawke	Richard Donner	Matthew Broderick, Rutger Hauer, Michelle Pfeiffer	United States	
Legend	Ridley Scott	Tom Cruise, Mia Sara, Tim Curry	United States	
The Peanut Butter Solution	Michael Rubbo	Mathew Mackay, Siluck Saysanasy, Alison Podbrey	Canada	
The Purple Rose of Cairo	Woody Allen	Mia Farrow, Jeff Daniels, Danny Aiello	United States	Romantic comedy
Rainbow Brite and the Star Stealer	Kimio Yabuki, Bernard Deyriès	Bettina, Patrick Fraley, Peter Cullen, Robbie Lee, Andre Stojka, David Mendenhall, Rhonda Aldrich, Les Tremayne, Mona Marshall, Jonathan Harris, Marissa Mendenhall, Scott Menville, Charles Adler, David Workman	United States	Animated film
Return to Oz	Walter Murch	Nicol Williamson, Jean Marsh, Fairuza Balk	United States	
Red Sonja	Richard Fleischer	Brigitte Nielsen, Arnold Schwarzenegger, Sandahl Bergman	United States	
Santa Claus: The Movie	Jeannot Szwarc	David Huddleston, John Lithgow, Dudley Moore	United States; United Kingdom	
Travels of Mr. Kleks	Krzysztof Gradowski	Piotr Fronczewski, Sławomir Wronka	Poland	
Weird Science	John Hughes	Anthony Michael Hall, Ilan Mitchell-Smith, Kelly LeBrock	United States	Comedy
Wizards of the Lost Kingdom	Héctor Olivera	Bo Svenson, Vidal Peterson	United States	
1986
Asterix in Britain	Pino Van Lamsweerde		France	Animated
Big Trouble in Little China	John Carpenter	Kurt Russell, Kim Cattrall, Dennis Dun, James Hong	United States	
Castle in the Sky	Hayao Miyazaki		Japan	Anime film
Dream Lovers	Tony Au	Chow Yun-fat, Cher Yeung	Hong Kong	
The Golden Child	Michael Ritchie	Eddie Murphy, Charles Dance, Charlotte Lewis	United States	
Highlander	Russell Mulcahy	Christopher Lambert, Roxanne Hart, Clancy Brown	United Kingdom; United States	
Labyrinth	Jim Henson	David Bowie, Jennifer Connelly, Toby Froud	United Kingdom; United States	
Momo	Johannes Schaaf	Radost Bokel, Mario Adorf, Armin Mueller-Stahl, Sylvester Groth	Germany; Italy	
Troll	John Carl Buechler	Noah Hathaway, Michael Moriarty, Shelley Hack, Jenny Beck, Sonny Bono, Phil Fondacaro, Anne Lockhart, Julia Louis-Dreyfus, Gary Sandy, June Lockhart	United States	Dark fantasy
The Worst Witch	Robert Young	Fairuza Balk, Diana Rigg, Charlotte Rae, Tim Curry	United Kingdom; United States	Television movie
1987
The Barbarians	Ruggero Deodato	David Paul, Peter Paul, Richard Lynch	Italy; United States	
*batteries not included	Matthew Robbins	Hume Cronyn, Jessica Tandy	United States	Science fantasy
A Chinese Ghost Story	Ching Siu Tung	Leslie Cheung, Wong Tsu Hsien, Wu Ma	Hong Kong	
Date with an Angel	Tom McLoughlin	Michael E. Knight, Phoebe Cates, Emmanuelle Béart	United States	Fantasy comedy
Gor	Fritz Kiersch	Jack Palance,	United States	
Harry and the Hendersons	William Dear	John Lithgow, Melinda Dillon, Don Ameche, David Suchet	United States	Fantasy comedy
Kingsize	Juliusz Machulski	Jacek Chmielnik, Katarzyna Figura, Jerzy Stuhr, Jan Machulski	Poland	
Mannequin	Michael Gottlieb	Andrew McCarthy, Kim Cattrall, Estelle Getty, James Spader	United States	Fantasy comedy
Masters of the Universe	Gary Goddard	Dolph Lundgren, Courteney Cox, Frank Langella, Meg Foster	United States	
Mio in the Land of Faraway	Vladimir Grammatikov	Christopher Lee, Christian Bale, Nicholas Pickard, Timothy Bottoms, Susannah York	Sweden; Soviet Union; Norway	
The Princess Bride	Rob Reiner	Cary Elwes, Robin Wright, Mandy Patinkin, Chris Sarandon	United States	
Rouge	Stanley Kwan	Anita Mui, Leslie Cheung, Man Chi Leung	Hong Kong	
Snow White	Michael Berz	Diana Rigg, Billy Barty, Sarah Patterson	United States	Fairy tale adaptation
Wicked City	Yoshiaki Kawajiri		Japan	
Wings of Desire	Wim Wenders	Bruno Ganz, Solveig Dommartin, Peter Falk	West Germany; France	
The Witches of Eastwick	George Miller	Jack Nicholson, Cher, Susan Sarandon, Michelle Pfeiffer	United States	Fantasy comedy
1988
The Adventures of Baron Munchausen	Terry Gilliam	John Neville, Sarah Polley, Eric Idle	United Kingdom; West Germany	
Alice	Jan Švankmajer	Kristina Kohoutova	Czechoslovakia; Switzerland	
Beetle Juice	Tim Burton	Alec Baldwin, Geena Davis, Michael Keaton, Winona Ryder	United States	Horror comedy
Big	Penny Marshall	Tom Hanks, Elizabeth Perkins, John Heard, Robert Loggia	United States	
Ernest Saves Christmas	John Cherry	Jim Varney	United States	Christmas comedy
The Land Before Time	Don Bluth	Gabriel Damon, Candace Huston, Judith Barsi, Will Ryan, Pat Hingle	United States	Animated film
My Neighbor Totoro	Hayao Miyazaki		Japan	Anime film
One, Two - Don't Let It Trouble You! (ru)	Mikhail Yuzovsky	Oleg Tabakov, Nikolai Karachentsov, Semyon Farada	Soviet Union	Steampunk fantasy
To Kill a Dragon	Mark Zakharov	Aleksandr Abdulov, Oleg Yankovsky, Yevgeny Leonov	Soviet Union	
Tommy Tricker and the Stamp Traveller	Michael Rubbo		Canada	
Tryumph of Mr. Kleks	Krzysztof Gradowski	Piotr Fronczewski, Sławomir Wronka	Poland	
Vibes	Ken Kwapis	Cyndi Lauper, Jeff Goldblum, Julian Sands, Googy Gress, Peter Falk	United States	
Vice Versa	Brian Gilbert	Judge Reinhold, Fred Savage, Corinne Bohrer	United States	
Willow	Ron Howard	Val Kilmer, Joanne Whalley, Warwick Davis	United States	
Who Framed Roger Rabbit	Robert Zemeckis	Bob Hoskins, Christopher Lloyd, Joanna Cassidy	United States	Comedy
1989
Asterix and the Big Fight	Philippe Grimond		France	Animated
Bill & Ted's Excellent Adventure	Stephen Herek	Keanu Reeves, Alex Winter, George Carlin	United States	Science fiction comedy
Dream a Little Dream	Marc Rocco	Corey Feldman, Corey Haim, Meredith Salenger, Jason Robards Jr.	United States	
Erik the Viking	Terry Jones	Tim Robbins, Terry Jones, Mickey Rooney, Eartha Kitt	United Kingdom; United States	
Field of Dreams	Phil Alden Robinson	Kevin Costner, Amy Madigan, James Earl Jones, Ray Liotta, Burt Lancaster	United States	Sports fantasy
Ghostbusters II	Ivan Reitman	Bill Murray, Dan Aykroyd, Sigourney Weaver, Harold Ramis, Rick Moranis	United States	Science fantasy horror comedy
Kiki's Delivery Service	Hayao Miyazaki		Japan	Anime film
The Little Mermaid	John Musker, Ron Clements	René Auberjonois, Christopher Daniel Barnes, Jodi Benson, Pat Carroll, Paddi Edwards, Buddy Hackett, Jason Marin, Kenneth Mars, Ben Wright, Samuel E. Wright	United States	Animated film
Little Monsters	Richard Alan Greenberg	Fred Savage, Howie Mandel, Rick Ducommun	United States	
Maria Mirabela în Tranzistoria	Ion Popescu-Gopo	Elena Zaițeva, Jorj Voicu, Mihai Bisericanu, Horațiu Mălăele	Romania, Soviet Union	Live-action/animated film
Second Sight	Joel Zwick	John Larroquette, Bronson Pinchot, Bess Armstrong, Stuart Pankin	United States	
Teen Witch	Dorian Walker	Robyn Lively, Dan Gauthier, Joshua Miller	United States	
Prancer	John Hancock	Rebecca Harrell, Sam Elliott, Cloris Leachman, John Joseph Duda	United States	Fantasy drama
