= So Good (TV series) =

- Genre: Cooking show, Food reality
- Created by: Hong Kong Television Broadcasts Limited
- Starring: So Sze Wong (蘇施黃); Taishan (泰山); Kendy Lee (李靜儀)
- Theme music composer: Taishan (泰山)
- Opening theme: So Far So Good (蘇 Far 蘇 Good) by So Sze Wong
- Ending theme: So Far So Good (蘇 Far 蘇 Good) by So Sze Wong
- Country of origin: Hong Kong
- Original language: Cantonese
- No. of seasons: 2
- No. of episodes: 99

Production
- Executive producer: Lau Wang Gei (劉宏基)
- Production locations: Hong Kong, Macau, Guangzhou, Taiwan
- Running time: 30 minutes including commercials
- Production companies: Television Broadcasts Limited; WELLFIT PRODUCTIONS LIMITED

Original release
- Network: Jade; HD Jade
- Release: 22 September 2008 – 3 April 2010

So Good (Chinese: 蘇GOOD) is a 2008 till 2010 cooking series/variety program produced by TVB and WellFit Productiopns Ltd., also sponsored by Town Gas. This is the first TVB program that had an outsourced production company.

Originally intended to be a 10 series cooking series, So Good became a hit amongst audiences in Hong Kong and abroad resulting in additional episodes added with 99 episodes total when the series ended. The show is hosted by So Sze Wong and the 99 episodes aired from 22 September 2008 to 2 October 2009.

== Presenters ==
So was a popular Cable TV Hong Kong cooking show before she was signed on with TVB. She is also a local radio DJ.

88.1 FM DJ Taishan (泰山) is a former co-host of the program, but he disappears in later episodes. So also parts way with assistant Kendy Lee, a former model.

== Format ==
The show features Cantonese cuisine from Hong Kong, Macau and China. The show consists of two segments, the first introduces the ingredients and the second consists of the actual process of cooking of the ingredients.

Most of the show is taped in studio, but there are scenes from locations across Hong Kong and a few from Macau.

== Broadcasts ==
Aired on TVB, the series are now available on DVD. It is also aired in China and overseas (Canada and the United States).

Television Broadcast Limited ©MMVIII (https://www.tvb.com)
