= See-Bar =

1980 Hong Kong film by Dennis Yu

- Traditional Chinese: 師爸
- Simplified Chinese: 师爸
- Hanyu Pinyin: Shī Bà
- Jyutping: Si1 Baa4
- Directed by: Dennis Yu
- Screenplay by: Thomas Tang
- Produced by: David Tong
- Starring: Chow Yun-fat; Dorothy Yu; Roy Chiao; Pai Ying
- Cinematography: Johnny Koo
- Edited by: Yu Kwok-fung
- Music by: Norman Law; Frankie Chan
- Production companies: David & David Investment (Film Dept.) Production
- Distributed by: Bang Bang Films
- Release date: 23 January 1980
- Running time: 86 minutes
- Country: Hong Kong
- Language: Cantonese

See-Bar, also known as God Father, is a 1980 Hong Kong action comedy film directed by Dennis Yu in his directorial debut and starring Chow Yun-fat, Dorothy Yu, Roy Chiao and Pai Ying.

== Plot ==
Kit works at his uncle Ching's car repair shop. Due to his reckless personality, Kit engages in a motorcycle race against a rascal, Q, and wrecks Q's bike, much to the dissatisfaction of the latter. Q and his acquaintances retaliate by wrecking Ching's repair shop and towing the vehicles away.

To get even with Q, Kit goes to an underground casino owned by triads, hoping to use swindling skills which he learned from his godfather, Kan, to win a large sum of money. Kan was one of the Double Supreme Conmen of Shanghai, but went anonymous after getting tired of jinag hu affairs. Kan advises against Kit from going back to the casino, but Kit goes anyway, wanting to help his uncle. However, Kit's swindling skills backfire, and he ends up owing a large amount.

Q's boss, Kwok Sin, is a businessman who manages a financial company on the surface, but in actuality, he is a triad member who secretly operates businesses in prostitution, gambling and drugs. To force Kit to pay his debts, Kwok orders his underlings to destroy his uncle's repair shop. Seeing his uncle's effort of many years being destroyed, Kit goes to his godfather for help, who promises to help him by asking Kit to search for his old partner, Chu Tung-san.

Chu Tung-san changed his name to Chu Kam-tau. As the Double Supreme Conmen of Shanghai reunite after many years, they both sigh about the past. Chu decides to help Kit by setting up a scam involving a major trading business. The greedy Kwok wants to join in. Chu and Kit scam Kwok by snatching a case of cash from Kwok during the trade. Kwok gives chases but cannot catch them. Kwok, who is hunted by his boss, Mr. Mo, for losing all his money, attempts to rob a bank with his underlings but is captured by the police. Kit visits Kwok in prison and mocks him.

== Cast ==
- Chow Yun-fat as Kit
- Dorothy Yu as Mei
- Roy Chiao as Ghost Eye Chu Tung-san
- Pai Ying as Kwok Sin
- Wong Ching as Yuen the smuggler
- Chiang Nan as Kan
- Ng Wui as Uncle Ching
- Steve Lee as Kit's cousin
- Alexander Chan
- Hon Lai-fan as Biker firl
- Lau Nga-lai as Yan's daughter
- Chiang Kam as Mechanic
- Yeung Yau-cheung as Government official
- Mok Chui-yan
- Bruce Mang as Q's buddy
- Stephen Wong
- Tam Tin-nam as Mr. Mo
- Lau Kwok-shing as Q
- Sau Lee-sam
- Pong Cheuk-lam as Yan
- Homer Cheung as One of Mr. Mo's men
- Wong Chik-sam as Mr. Ngok
- Hung Fung as One of Mr. Mo's men
- Fo Yi
- Lee Wai-mui
- Chui Wan-sang
- Fung Yun-chuen
- Nam Wai as Thug

== Theme song ==
- Aspire to Travel Far (志在四方)
  - Composer: Joseph Koo
  - Lyricist: Thomas Tang
  - Singer: Roman Tam

== Reception ==
The film is part of the Hong Kong New Wave. So Good Reviews gave the film a negative review criticizing its lack of interest, humor and excitement with only a sole funny scene.

== See also ==
- Chow Yun-fat filmography
