= City War =

1988 Hong Kong film by Sun Chung

- Film poster
- Traditional Chinese: 義膽紅唇
- Simplified Chinese: 义胆红唇
- Hanyu Pinyin: Yì Dǎn Hóng Chún
- Jyutping: Ji6 Daam2 Hung4 Syun4
- Directed by: Sun Chung (孫仲)
- Screenplay by: Leung Wai-ting; Rico Chung; Tung Liu
- Produced by: Dean Shek
- Starring: Chow Yun-fat; Ti Lung
- Cinematography: Lee San-yip; Lam Chiu
- Edited by: Wong Ming-lam
- Music by: Michael Lai
- Distributed by: Cinema City
- Release date: 21 December 1988
- Running time: 92 minutes
- Country: Hong Kong
- Language: Cantonese
- Box office: HK$13,230,754

City War is a 1988 Hong Kong crime action film directed by Sun Chung and starring Chow Yun-fat and Ti Lung in their third collaboration following their previous film appearences in John Woo's A Better Tomorrow (1986) and A Better Tomorrow II (1987).

== Plot ==
This Hong Kong crime thriller stars Chow Yun-Fat and Ti Lung as two cops who must hunt down Chu, a crime boss who has just been released from prison and is out for revenge against the mismatched partners. Dick Lee (Chow Yun-fat) and Ken Chow (Ti Lung) are two police officers and are friends. Dick Lee is a negotiator who is a humorous and easy going. Ken Chow is a hot tempered cop who hates evil as his enemy and advocates violence for violence. Drug lord Ted Yiu, who was imprisoned by Ken two years ago, was released from prison and Ken's former partner Ho Ka Ting is mysteriously killed. Later, Ted also laid traps to trick Ken, which cause his disciplinary punishment by the police and later sends killers to threaten Ken's life and kill his family. On the other hand, Dick incidentally meets Penny, who is Ted's lover. A tangled conflict later brakes off in the city.

== Cast ==
This is a list of cast.

- Chow Yun-fat as Dick Lee
- Ti Lung as Ken Chow
- Tien Niu as Penny
- Norman Chui as Ted Yiu
- Mary Hon as Fan
- Teresa Carpio as Teresa
- Lo Lieh as Boss Kuen
- Lee Ka-ting as Assistant Chief Officer Ho Ka-ting
- Michael Chow as Bobby
- Ricky Wong as Sergeant Wu
- Law Ching-ho as bartender
- Chan Chi-fai as Ted's thug
- Robin Shou as Ted's hired killer
- John Ladalski as arms smuggler
- Eddie Maher as arms smuggler's assistant
- Ng Hong-sang as man who gives guns to Dick Lee
- Wong Chi-ming as cop
- Leung Kam-san as cop
- Yee Tin-hung as cop in shower room
- Chiu Chun-chiu as cop
- Wong Lik as cop
- Lee Fat-yuen as cop in flashback
- Tse Wai-kit as teenage shoplifter
- Lam Kai-wing as killer with female partner
- Chow Wing
- Leung Wai-hung
- Robert Mak
- Alan Chan
- Tang Mei-mei
- Lin Li-na
- Chau Hou-yin
- Kwok Siu-kei
- John Ching
- Wong Chi-wai
- Jackson Ng
- Wan Seung-lam
- Lam Foo-wai
- Jim James as gweilo at the bar

== Box office ==
The film grossed HK$13,230,754 at the Hong Kong box office during its theatrical run from 21 December 1988 to 27 January 1989 in Hong Kong.

== Theme song ==
- Melting You and Me (熱溶你與我)
  - Composer: Michael Lai
  - Lyricist: Wong Jim
  - Singer: Anita Mui

== See also ==
- Chow Yun-fat filmography
