= Look Out, Officer! =

1990 Hong Kong film by Lau Sez-yue

- Film poster
- Traditional Chinese: 師兄撞鬼
- Simplified Chinese: 师兄撞鬼
- Hanyu Pinyin: Shī Xiōng Zhuàng Guǐ
- Jyutping: Si1 Hing1 Zong2 Gwai2
- Directed by: Lau Sze-yue
- Screenplay by: Steven Tsui
- Based on: Where's Officer Tuba? by Barry Wong
- Produced by: Lau Tin-chi
- Starring: Stephen Chow; Bill Tung; Stanley Fung
- Cinematography: Nico Wong
- Edited by: Chiang Hsing-lung
- Music by: Sherman Chow
- Production companies: Shaw Brothers Studio; Cosmopolitan Film Productions
- Distributed by: D&B Film Distribution
- Release date: 28 July 1990
- Running time: 87 minutes
- Country: Hong Kong
- Language: Cantonese
- Box office: HK$12,128,944

Look Out, Officer! (師兄撞鬼) is a 1990 Hong Kong comedy film directed by Lau Sez-yue and starring Stephen Chow, Bill Tung and Stanley Fung. The film is a remake of the 1986 film, Where's Officer Tuba?, which starred Sammo Hung.

== Cast and roles ==
- Stephen Chow as Sing
- Bill Tung as Uncle Cheung Biu
- Stanley Fung as Li Kam
- Vivian Chen as Yuk
- Sunny Fang as Tang Lee-yang
- Amy Yip as Kam's Superior (cameo)
- Cutie Mui as Police officer counting bullets
- Mak Yan-wa as Undercover policewoman
- Bak Ka-sin as Undercover policewoman
- Chan Lap-ban as Cleaning lady
- Lee Hang as Biu
- Tang Tai-wo as Tang's assistant
- Chun Kwai-bo as Tang's drug worker
- Tony Tam as Tang's drug worker
- Mak Wai-cheung as Tang's drug worker
- Ho Wing-cheung as Tang's drug worker
- Law Ching-ho as Heavenly judge
- Wong Tin-lam as Movie director (cameo)
- Ling Chi-hung as Tang's thug
- Tam Wai-man as Tang's thug
- Indra Leech as Police officer
- Simon Cheung as Policeman
- Fei Pak as Policeman
- Ernest Mauser as Ceausescu
- Woo Wing-tat as Tang's drug worker
- Tam Ho-sing
- Sam Ka-kei
- Danny Tang as Massage parlour thug

== Box office ==
The film grossed HK $12,128,944 at the Hong Kong box office during its theatrical run from 28 July to 16 August 1990 in Hong Kong.
