= Suzie Wong (TV host) =

Hong Kong radio personality

- Born: Lau Ko Chung; 17 February 1955 (age 70)
- Partner: Elaine Jin
- Awards: TVB Anniversary Awards – Best Show Host; 2008 So Good

Chinese name
- Traditional Chinese: 蘇施黃
- Simplified Chinese: 苏施黄
Transcriptions

Suzie Wong (Chinese: 蘇施黃) (born Lau Ko Chung (Chinese: 劉高琮); 17 February 1955) is a popular radio host and TV cooking programme host in Hong Kong.

== Biography ==
Wong was born in Hong Kong, she had two older brothers and three older sisters. She graduated in St. Stephen's Girls' College before she went to Canada and spent another year for high school. Then, she gained an Honours Bachelor of Arts degree in Psychology from the University of Alberta in 1978.

After she finished her undergraduate degree, she went back to Hong Kong and joined the Commercial Radio Hong Kong (CR) and become a disk jockey (DJ) since 1978. In mid 1980s, she left CR and joined a couple types of career such as marketing and insurances.

In 1999, Wong went back to CR as a DJ. Besides, she began her cooking career since she became a cooking tutor in Towngas Cooking Centre. Later on, she become a television presenter for cooking shows such as So Real Time Cooking Series which produced by Cable TV Hong Kong and So Good which produced by TVB.

On 31 December 2019, Wong left CR after 41 years with her radio career and started her YouTube channel, This is So good.

== Personal life ==
Wong came out as lesbian in 2010, and announced that her partner is Taiwanese actress Elaine Jin.
