= Albert Au =

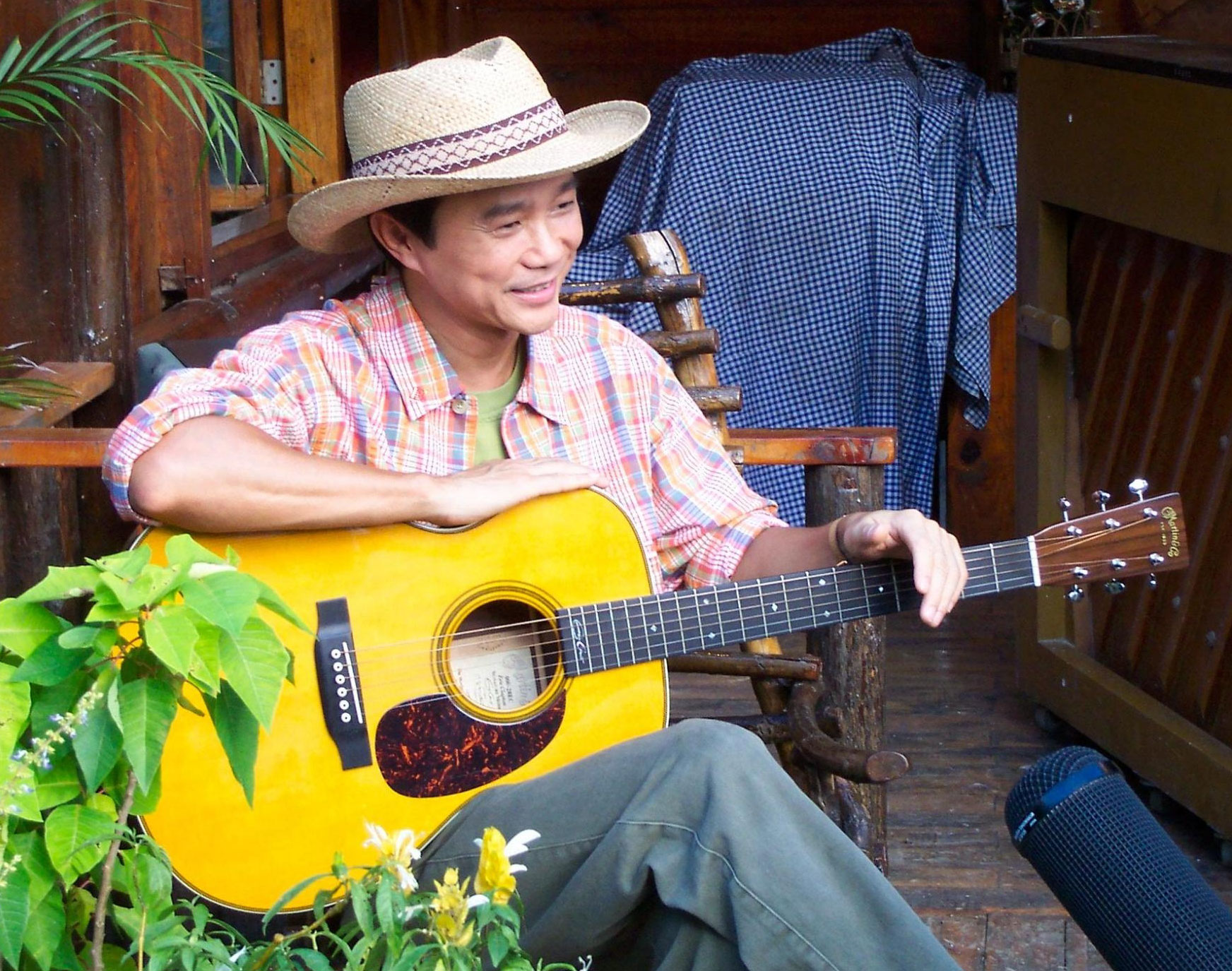
- Born: 31 July 1955 (age 70); Hong Kong
- Occupations: Singer, dj
- Years active: 1979–present

Chinese name
- Traditional Chinese: 區瑞強
- Simplified Chinese: 区瑞强
Transcriptions
Standard Mandarin
- Hanyu Pinyin: Oū Ruìqiáng
Yue: Cantonese
- Yale Romanization: Āu Seui kèuhng
- Jyutping: Au1 Seoi3-koeng4
- Musical career
- Genres: Folk music
- Instruments: vocal, guitar

Albert Au Shui Keung (Chinese: 區瑞強) is a Hong Kong English pop and Cantopop singer-songwriter and DJ at RTHK. Albert grew up in Hong Kong, and his ancestral hometown is Zhaoqing city, Guangdong province. A graduate of Hong Kong Baptist University, he debuted in 1979 and achieved considerable fame in the 1980s with his folk music. He also appeared in movies and on TV. He is also operating some music educational establishments.

Albert performed two live shows at the Hong Kong Cultural Centre on June 21 and 22, 2021, titled "My Home You Will Reunite Concert 2021". Before that, he performed an online gig on May 14, accompanied by his friends on piano and guitar, it was billed as a prelude to the two live shows.

== Filmography ==
- McDull, the Alumni (2006)
- Throw Down (2006)
- Tigers, The Legend of Canton (Guang Dong wu hu zhi tie quan wu di Sun Zhong Shan) (1993)
- Let Us Flirt, Partner (Pai dang chuang qing guan) (1985)
- The Return of Pom Pom (1984)
- The Militarism Revival (Nu ba tai yang qi) (1983)
- Return of the Condor Heroes (Sun diu hap lui) (1983)
- Love Encore (TVB 1982)
- Sealed with a Kiss (Liang xiao wu zhi) (1981)
- Dangerous Encounters of the First Kind (Di yi lei xing wei xian) (1980)

== Albums ==
- Folk Together (Disc 1)
- Folk Together (Disc 2)
- Folk Together (Disc 3)

== Covered Songs ==
- "The Sound of Silence"
- "I'll Have To Say I Love You in a Song"
- "Longer"
- "Vincent"
- "If"
- "You've Got a Friend"
- "Windflowers"
- "Bridge over Trouble Water"
- "Danny's Song"
- "Dust in the Wind"
- "Diary"
- "Perhaps Love"
- "The End of the World"
- "Visions"
- "Love Me Tender"
- "Both Sides Now"
- "Rhinestone Cowboy"
- "Streets of London"
- "House of Rising Sun"
- "Yellow Bird"
- "Try to Remember"
- "Country Roads"
- "When a Child Is Born"
