= Lam Manyee =

Chinese music composer from Hong Kong

- Chinese: 林敏怡
- Born: September 10, 1950 (age 75); Hong Kong
- Other names: Lam Man-Yi, Violet Lam, Violet Lam Man Yee
- Education: University of Hong Kong, Santa Cecilia Conservatory
- Occupation: Music composer

Lam Manyee (Chinese: 林敏怡) is a Chinese composer and music producer from Hong Kong.

== Early life ==
On 10 September 1950, Lam was born in Hong Kong.

== Education ==
Lam graduated from the University of Hong Kong in psychology and sociology. Later she studied piano at the Santa Cecilia Conservatory in Rome from 1973 until 1976 with Franco Evangelisti and composition at the Hochschule für Musik Freiburg with Brian Ferneyhough. In 2009, she also gained qualification as a naturopathic practitioner.

== Career ==
Lam is a composer in Hong Kong and the United States. Lam has composed for orchestra, ballet and solo instrument. Lam has also composed over 50 film scores, music for TV and over 150 pop songs.

== Works ==
This is a partial list of Lam's works.

- Interludes for prepared piano, 1977
- Journey for chamber ensemble, 1977–78
- Monologo II for cello, piano and tapes, 1980
- Die Meng (Butterfly Dream), Chinese orchestra, 1978
- Ceng Die, 1981
- Double Triangle, ballet, 1976
- Bamboo Suite, ballet, 1983
- Mixed Visions, ballet, 1983
- Chinese Historical Myths, ballet, 1985
- ID Shuffle, ballet, 1985
- Kwaidan/Emaki, ballet, 1986
- Diary, ballet, 1988
- Hell Screen, ballet, 1990
- Stories of Aung San Suu Kyi, ballet, 1992
- Open Party, ballet, 1994
- Is there Life on Mars?, ballet, 1997
- Dream City, ballet, 1998
- Beauty and the Beast, ballet, 1999

== Filmography ==
- A Kid from Tibet (1992) - Music
- All’s Well, Ends Well (1982) - Music
- All’s Well, Ends Well ’97 (1997) - Music
- The Dragon from Russia (1990) - Music
- Esprit D’amour (1983) - Music
- Happy Together (1989) - Music
- Heart of Dragon (1985) - Music
- Hong Kong 1941 (1984) - Music
- Love Unto Wastes (1986) - Music
- On the Run (1988) - Music
- Once a Thief (1991) - Music.
- Witch from Nepal (1986) - Music
