= William Chang =

Hong Kong filmmaker

- Born: November 12, 1953 (age 72); Hong Kong
- Awards: Hong Kong Film Awards – Best Art Direction; 1985 Homecoming; 1989 As Tears Go By; 1991 Days of Being Wild; 1995 Ashes of Time; 2001 In the Mood for Love; 2005 2046; 2013 The Grandmaster Best Costume Design; 1993 The Legend of the Swordsman; 1995 Ashes of Time; 1996 The Phantom Lover; 2001 In the Mood for Love; 2005 2046; 2013 The Grandmaster Best Editing; 1995 Chungking Express; 2001 In the Mood for Love; 2013 The Grandmaster

Chinese name
- Traditional Chinese: 張叔平
- Simplified Chinese: 张叔平
Transcriptions
Standard Mandarin
- Hanyu Pinyin: Zhāng Shūpíng
Yue: Cantonese
- Jyutping: Zoeng1 Suk1Ping4

William Chang Suk-ping (Chinese: 張叔平; born 12 November 1953) is a Hong Kong production designer, costume designer and film editor. Along with cinematographer Christopher Doyle, Chang is an important collaborator with Hong Kong film director Wong Kar-wai. He has also collaborated with directors such as Stanley Kwan, Patrick Tam, Yim Ho, Tsui Hark, Jiang Wen and Johnnie To. He is of Shanghainese ancestry.

In 2014, Chang received an Oscar nomination for Best Costume Design at the 86th Academy Awards for his work on The Grandmaster. In the same year, he was invited to become a member of the Academy of Motion Picture Arts and Sciences.

== Awards and nominations ==
Organisation	Year	Category	Nominated work	Result	Ref.
Academy Awards	2014	Best Costume Design	The Grandmaster	Nominated	
Golden Horse Awards	1981	Best Art Direction	All the Wrong Clues for the Right Solution	Nominated	
Golden Horse Awards	1984	Best Art Direction	The Last Affair	Nominated	
Golden Horse Awards	1984	Best Makeup & Costume Design	The Last Affair	Nominated	
Golden Horse Awards	1986	Best Art Direction	Passion	Won	
Golden Horse Awards	1986	Best Art Direction	Dream Lovers	Nominated	
Golden Horse Awards	1986	Best Makeup & Costume Design	Dream Lovers	Won	
Golden Horse Awards	1988	Best Art Direction	As Tears Go By	Nominated	
Golden Horse Awards	1991	Best Art Direction	Days of Being Wild	Won	
Golden Horse Awards	1991	Best Makeup and Costume Design	Days of Being Wild	Won	
Golden Horse Awards	2013	Best Art Direction	The Grandmaster	Won (Note: With Alfred Yau)	
Golden Horse Awards	2013	Best Makeup and Costume Design	The Grandmaster	Won	
Golden Horse Awards	2013	Best Editing	The Grandmaster	Nominated	
Hong Kong Film Awards	1983	Best Art Direction	It Takes Two	Nominated (Note: With Yee Chung-Man)	
Hong Kong Film Awards	1983	Best Art Direction	Nomad	Nominated	
Hong Kong Film Awards	1984	Best Art Direction	Zu Warriors from the Magic Mountain	Nominated	
Hong Kong Film Awards	1984	Best Art Direction	The Last Affair	Nominated	
Hong Kong Film Awards	1985	Best Art Direction	Homecoming	Won	
Hong Kong Film Awards	1986	Best Art Direction	Infatuation	Nominated	
Hong Kong Film Awards	1987	Best Art Direction	Dream Lovers	Nominated	
Hong Kong Film Awards	1987	Best Art Direction	Passion	Nominated	
Hong Kong Film Awards	1988	Best Art Direction	As Tears Go By	Won	
Hong Kong Film Awards	1991	Best Art Direction	Days of Being Wild	Won	
Hong Kong Film Awards	2003	Best Art Direction	Chinese Odyssey 2002	Nominated	

== See also ==
- List of film director and editor collaborations
