= The Battle Among the Clans =

Hong Kong television series

- DVD cover
- Genre: Clan drama
- Written by: Chan Hing-ka; Tsang Kan-cheong; Sharon Au
- Directed by: Yip Sing-hong; Poon Ka-tak; Ng Yat-fan; Wong Kin-fan; Law Chun-ngok
- Starring: Chow Yun-fat; Sean Lau; Eddie Kwan; Mini Kung; David Lui; Kenneth Tsang; Kwan Hoi-san
- Theme music composer: Joseph Koo
- Opening theme: The Search For Love (愛的尋覓) by Kitman Mak
- Ending theme: Speak Out Your Love (說出你的愛) by Kitman Mak
- Country of origin: Hong Kong
- Original language: Cantonese
- No. of episodes: 30

Production
- Producer: Chiu Chun-keung
- Production locations: Hong Kong; Macau
- Running time: 45 minutes per episode
- Production company: TVB

Original release
- Network: TVB Jade
- Release: 27 May – 5 July 1985

The Battle Among the Clans
- Traditional Chinese: 大香港
- Simplified Chinese: 大香港
- Literal meaning: "The Great Hong Kong"
Transcriptions
Standard Mandarin
- Hanyu Pinyin: Dà Xiāng Gǎng
Yue: Cantonese
- Jyutping: Daai6 Heong1 Gong2

The Battle Among the Clans (大香港) is a Hong Kong clan drama series produced by TVB that took place from the mid-1940s to 1950s.

== Plot ==
The story begins with the Japanese occupation of Hong Kong coming to an end in 1945 and the remaining Japanese dying or leaving the territory. The British colonial government have yet to fully resume its duties. Citizens themselves are flushing out the remaining traitors one by one. Soon, multiple societies of different legions were formed within the HK underground. Each one tries to control the city in a time of very weak and corrupt governance. Eventually the big clans merge, expand and betray one another. The two major rivals, one run by the Lok family head Lok Zung-hing (Chow Yun-fat), the other by Ng Yat-tin (Tai Chi-wai) would collide.

== Production note ==
Five years prior to the release of this series, the producer Chiu Chun-keung (招振強) collaborated with Chow-Yun-fat to release The Bund, a similarly themed story except in Shanghai instead of Hong Kong.

== Cast ==
Cast	Role
Chow Yun-fat	Lok Chung-hing (駱中興)
Sean Lau	Lam Cho (林祖)
Eddie Kwan (關禮傑)	Hong Kwan (康鈞)
Mini kung (龔慈恩)	Shu Mei (舒薇)
David Lui (呂方)	Wong Tai-kuen (王帝權)
Kenneth Tsang	Luk Hoi (陸海)
Kwan Hoi-san	Tsang Yung (曾翁)
Tai Chi-wai (戴志偉)	Ng Yat-tin (吳日天)
Ko Miu-si (高妙思)	Mang Ha (孟霞)
Michelle Sze-ma (司馬燕)	Simone (曾善美)
Wong Wan-choi (黃允材)	Hong ting-san (康定山)
Lau Miu-ling (劉妙玲)	Man (阿雯)
Danny Poon (潘宏彬)	Lok Chun-wah (駱振華)
Chan On-ying (陳安瑩)	Lok Wan-chi (駱雲芝)
Benz Hui (許紹雄)	Wah Piu (華彪)

== See also ==
- The Bund (TV series)
- Chow Yun-fat filmography
