= The Christ of Nanjing =

1995 Hong Kong-Japanese film by Tony Au

- Film poster
- Directed by: Tony Au
- Screenplay by: Joyce Chan
- Based on: The Christ of Nanjing by Akutagawa Ryunosuke
- Produced by: Chua Lam; Akira Morishige
- Starring: Tony Leung Ka-fai; Yasuko Tomita
- Cinematography: Bill Wong
- Edited by: Cheung Ka-fai; Peter Cheung
- Music by: Shigeru Umebayashi
- Production companies: Golden Harvest; Amuse, Inc.
- Distributed by: Golden Harvest
- Release dates: 24 November 1995 (Hong Kong); 9 December 1995 (Japan)
- Running time: 99 minutes
- Countries: Hong Kong; Japan
- Languages: Cantonese; Japanese
- Box office: HK$746,913

The Christ of Nanjing (Chinese: 南京的基督) is a 1995 erotic romantic drama film directed by Tony Au, starring Tony Leung Ka-fai and Yasuko Tomita. The film is based on the work of famed Japanese novelist Akutagawa Ryunosuke. Tomita won the award for best actress at 1995 Tokyo International Film Festival for her performance in the film.

== Cast ==
- Tony Leung Ka-fai as Ryuichiro Kagawa
- Yasuko Tomita as Jin Hua
- Tou Chung-hua as Tan Yong-nian
- Jessica Chow as Cameila
- Lau Shun as "Madame" of Lotus House
- Kumi Nakamura as Ryuichiro's wife
- Tong Bo-lin
- Johnson Yuen as Xiaoer

== Awards and nominations ==
Awards and nominations
Ceremony	Category	Recipient	Outcome
8th Tokyo International Film Festival	Best Actress	Yasuko Tomita	Won
8th Tokyo International Film Festival	Best Artistic Contribution	Tony Au	Won
8th Tokyo International Film Festival	Tokyo Grand Prix	Tony Au	Nominated
15th Hong Kong Film Awards	Best Art Direction	Eddie Ma	Nominated
15th Hong Kong Film Awards	Best Costume & Make Up Design	Mok Kwan-kit	Nominated
