= Heart of Dragon =

1985 Hong Kong film by Sammo Hung

- Film poster

Chinese name
- Traditional Chinese: 龍的心
- Simplified Chinese: 龙的心
Transcriptions
Standard Mandarin
- Hanyu Pinyin: Lóng Dé Xīn
Yue: Cantonese
- Jyutping: Lung4 Dik1 Sam1
- Directed by: Sammo Hung
- Written by: Barry Wong
- Produced by: Chua Lam; Wu Ma; Leonard Ho
- Starring: Jackie Chan; Sammo Hung; Emily Chu; Mang Hoi; Lam Ching-ying; James Tien; Yuen Wah
- Cinematography: Arthur Wong
- Edited by: Peter Cheung; Joseph Chiang; Wong Ping; Ding Yue; Ng Kwok-wa
- Music by: Violet Lam; Calvin Poon; Sherman Chow
- Production companies: Bo Ho Film Company Ltd; Paragon Films
- Distributed by: Golden Harvest
- Release date: 16 October 1985
- Running time: 98 minutes
- Country: Hong Kong
- Language: Cantonese
- Box office: HK$20.3 million

Heart of Dragon, (Chinese: 龍的心) released in the United Kingdom as Heart of the Dragon, is a 1985 Hong Kong action drama film directed by Sammo Hung, who also starred in the lead role. The film co-stars Jackie Chan, Emily Chu and Mang Hoi. Yuen Biao, Yuen Wah, and Corey Yuen were among the action directors for the film.

== Cast ==
- Jackie Chan as Ted / Tat Fung
- Sammo Hung as Danny / Dodo Fung
- Emily Chu as Jenny
- Mang Hoi as Yan
- Lam Ching-ying as SWAT Team Commander
- Peter Chan as SWAT Team Member
- Chin Kar-lok as Lok
- Yuen Wah as SWAT Team Member
- Corey Yuen as SWAT Team Member
- Melvin Wong as Inspector Wong
- Dennis Chan as Waiter
- Anthony Chan as Private Teacher
- Chung Fat as Moose / Cho Yee-fat / Fa
- James Tien as Mr. Kim
- Dick Wei as Kim's Man
- Phillip Ko as Kim's Man
- Shan Tai as Kim's Man
- Kao Sau-leung as Kim's Man
- Kong Chow as Kim's Man
- Billy Ching as Kim's Man
- Tai San as Kim's Man
- Wu Ma as Cafe Owner
- Soh Hang-suen as Cafe Owner's wife
- Lam Ying-fat as Edmond Pang Kwok-wah
- Lee Ka-ho – Heung Chi-ming
- Tze Man-ha – Mrs. Chee / Grandma
- Tai Bo as Kenny
- Lee Hoi-sang as Thug at restaurant
- Fung Hak-on as Thug at restaurant
- Chiu Chi-ling as Thug at restaurant

== Awards and nominations ==
Awards and nominations
Ceremony	Category	Recipient	Result	Reference(s)
5th Hong Kong Film Awards	Best Director	Sammo Hung	Nominated	
5th Hong Kong Film Awards	Best Actor	Jackie Chan	Nominated	
5th Hong Kong Film Awards	Best Action Choreography	Sammo Hung Stunt Team	Nominated	
5th Hong Kong Film Awards	Best Original Film Score	Violet Lam	Nominated	
5th Hong Kong Film Awards	Best Original Film Song	Song: Who Could Be Dependent (誰可相依) Composer: Violet Lam; Lyrics: Calvin Poon; Sung by: Julie Su	Won	

== See also ==
- Jackie Chan filmography
- List of Hong Kong films
- Rain Man (1988)
