= Tony Au =

Hong Kong film director and artist

- 區丁平
- Born: Au Ting-Ping; February 18, 1954 (age 72); Guangdong, China
- Education: London Film Academy
- Occupations: art director, artist
- Spouse: Teresa Mo (m. 1995)
- Children: Au Yik-san (daughter); Au Ling-san (daughter)

Chinese name
- Traditional Chinese: 區丁平
- Simplified Chinese: 区丁平
Transcriptions
Standard Mandarin
- Hanyu Pinyin: Ōu Dīng Píng
Yue: Cantonese
- Jyutping: Au1 Ding1 Ping4

Tony Au Ting-Ping (Chinese: 區丁平; born 18 February 1954) is a Hong Kong film director and artist.

== Biography ==
He was born in Guangdong. After graduating from high school in 1972, he engaged in fashion design. Afterwards, he studied filming at the London Film Academy. He entered the Hong Kong film industry in 1979.

He is married to the actress Teresa Mo (毛舜筠) and has two daughters, Au Yik-san (區亦山) and Au Ling-san (區令山).

== Career ==
His work as art director includes: Tsui Hark's Dangerous Encounters of the First Kind (1980), Ann Hui's The Story of Woo Viet (1981), Boat People (1982), Ronny Yu's The Postman Strikes Back (1982), Clifford Choi's Lemon Coke (1982), and Shu Kei's Soul (1986).

== Filmography ==
Filmography as director, art director and other positions:

- Men Suddenly In Black 2 (2006), Art director
- Chinese Odyssey 2002 (2002), Production Designer
- Troublesome Night 3 (1998), Actor
- The Christ of Nanjing (1995), Director
- A Touch Of Evil (1995), Director, Writer
- Crime Story (1993), Art director
- Flying Dagger (1993), Art director
- A Roof With A View (1993), Director
- King of Beggars (1992), Costume Designer
- Au Revoir Mon Amour (1991), Director
- Finale In Blood (1991), Producer
- Blonde Fury (1989), Art director
- I'm Sorry (1988), Director
- Profiles Of Pleasure (1988), Director, Art director
- Sworn Brothers (1987), Art director, Actor
- Dream Lovers (1986), Director
- Legacy of Rage (1986), Art director
- The Millionaire's Express (1986), Costume Designer, Art director
- Rosa (1986), Art director
- Where's Officer Tuba? (1986), Art director
- Soul (1986), Art director
- Women (1985), Art director
- Love in a Fallen City (1984), Art director
- The Last Affair (1983), Director
- Lemon Coke (1982), Art director
- The Postman Strikes Back (1982), Art director
- Boat People (1982), Art director
- Teenage Dreamers (1982), Art director
- RTHK television drama 浮雲 (1981), Actor
- The Story of Woo Viet (1981), Art director
- The Beasts (1980), Art director
- Dangerous Encounters of the First Kind (1980), Art director
- See Bar (1980), Art director

== Awards ==
In 1983, he won Best Art Direction award with Boat People at the second Hong Kong Film Awards. In the same year, he directed Last Affair, which won the Best New Performer and the Best Cinematography awards at the third Hong Kong Film Awards. In 1986, he directed Dream Lovers, which won the Best Original Film Score award at the sixth Hong Kong Film Awards. In 1995, he directed Hong Kong-Japan film The Christ of Nanjing, which won the Best Artistic Contribution Award at the eighth Tokyo International Film Festival.
