= Dream Lovers =

1986 Hong Kong film by Tony Au

- Film poster
- Traditional Chinese: 夢中人
- Simplified Chinese: 梦中人
- Hanyu Pinyin: Mèng Zhōng Rén
- Jyutping: Mung6 Zung1 Jan4
- Directed by: Tony Au
- Screenplay by: Manfred Wong; Chiu Kang-chien
- Story by: Chiu Kang-chien
- Produced by: Vicky Lee Leung
- Starring: Chow Yun-fat; Brigitte Lin; Cher Yeung
- Cinematography: Bill Wong
- Edited by: Yu Ma-chiu
- Music by: Law Wing-fai
- Production company: D&B Films
- Release date: 25 April 1986 (Hong Kong)
- Running time: 95 minutes
- Country: Hong Kong
- Language: Cantonese
- Box office: HK$7,289,958

Dream Lovers is a 1986 Hong Kong romantic fantasy film directed by Tony Au. The film stars Chow Yun-fat as Song Yu, a famous orchestra conductor who recently has visions of a beautiful woman and a Qin dynasty era terracotta statue. When Song visits the statues, he meets Cheung Yuet-heung (Brigitte Lin), who also has dreams of a long lost lover. but with her visions being more violent. The two meet with a medium who tells them that they are the reincarnations of a pair of lovers who were murdered hundreds of years earlier.

Dream Lovers was Au's second film following 1983's Last Affair where he again worked with Chow. The film grossed over HK$7 million on its release and was nominated for four awards at the 6th Hong Kong Film Awards, where Law Wing-fai won the award for Best Original Film Score.

== Cast ==
- Chow Yun-fat as Song Yu
- Brigitte Lin as Cheng Yuet-heung
- Cher Yueng as Wah-lei
- Kwan Shan as Har-nam
- Elaine Jin as Har-nam's wife
- Lam Chung as Li Chang

== Production ==
The film was a production of D&B Films. The film starred Chow Yun-fat and Brigitte Lin, the only film where the two star together. Chow had previously worked with director Tony Au on the 1982 film, Last Affair. Dream Lovers was one of the first Hong Kong films to utilize the popular Terracotta Warrior figures that were excavated from Qin Shi Huangs tomb in 1974.

== Release ==
Dream Warriors was released in Hong Kong on 25 April 1986 and grossed a total of HK$7,289,958 during its theatrical run. The film was released on VHS by Tai Seng Entertainment, on Laserdisc by Mei Ah Entertainment and on VCD and DVD by Mega Star Video.

== Reception ==
At the 6th Hong Kong Film Awards, Law Wing-fai won the award for Best Original Film Score. Cher Yeung was nominated for Best Supporting Actress for her role as Wah-lei. Bill Wong was nominated for Best Cinematography and William Chang was nominated for Best Art Direction.

In his book The Hong Kong Filmography, 1977-1997, author Charles Strong gave the film a nine out of ten rating stating that "aside from fine work by Chow and Lin, and Au's artful compositions, the main asset here is Law Wing-fai's award-winning score". Jonathan Crow for the online film database AllMovie gave the film a four out of five star rating.

== See also ==
- List of Hong Kong films of 1986
- List of fantasy films of the 1980s
