= The 36 Crazy Fists =

1977 Hong Kong film by Charlie Chan

- 三十六迷形拳
- Directed by: Charlie Chen Chi-Hwa
- Written by: Sze-To On
- Starring: Tony Leung Siu-Hung; Lau Kar-yung
- Distributed by: United Enterprise Corp.
- Release date: 1977
- Running time: 90 minutes
- Country: Hong Kong
- Language: Mandarin

The 36 Crazy Fists (Chinese: 三十六迷形拳), also known as Bloodpact, Blood Pact, The Master and the Boxer, and Secrets of the Young Master, is a 1977 Mandarin-language Hong Kong action martial arts film directed by Charlie Chen Chi-Hwa. Jackie Chan was the stunt coordinator and action director for part of the film.

== Premise ==
The film opens with the only footage of Jackie Chan in the entire film, namely brief scenes of him practicing with his stunt team while a voiceover claims that this Chan's "first" film as kung fu director (though he had already worked as martial arts director in earlier films such as Fist to Fist). The story of the film then begins, with a novice buddhist monk learning to master kung fu techniques in order to avenge his father, who was murdered by gangsters.

== Cast ==
- Tony Leung Siu-Hung as Wong Tai Kwong
- Lau Kar-yung as Shan Ho Kuan
- Yen Shi-Kwan as Mo Dung Tak
- Ku Feng as Tai Kuang's master
- Michelle Yim as Wong Wai Chi
- Paul Chun as Monk Chu Shan Feng
- Fung Hak-On as Tai Kuang's opponent
- San Kuai as Head Thug
- Chan Lau as Official
- Chiang Cheng as Drunkard
- Lee Man-Tai as Twitching Abbott
- Pak Sha-Lik as Monk
- Ma Hon-Yuen as Young Monk
- Che Dei
- Jackie Chan (cameo)
- Sham Chin-Bo
- Cheung Chok-Chow
- Paul Wong (extra)
- Benny Lai (extra)

== Reception ==
A presentation of the film in More 100% Jackie Chan : the essential companion volume 2 stated, "Despite fans avoiding the film because it is not a Jackie Chan picture, the fights show some of that Chan-esque comedy that would be seen in his later and earlier work. The cast of fighters, from Tony Leung Siu-hung to Yen Shi-kwan were not good in acting, but their fighting skills made up for it. Ku Feng even provided some of the comedy that would be like Chan in films like Young Master and Dragon Lord. Despite what the cover says, Jackie did not direct the film. He was only the Kung-fu Director. Furthermore, he wasn't the star. Nevertheless, the film is still an enjoyable film to watch in my opinion, if you want to see some early work from Chan and his stars, Tony Leung Siu-hung and Jimmy Liu Chia-yung."

"Such ingenuity is typical of Chan's films. His 1980 directorial debut, The 36 Crazy Fists, was the first martial-arts film to combine action and comedy effectively, and Chan's incredible inventiveness with action scenes long ago earned him the nickname 'the Buster Keaton of martial arts'", commented The Washington Times.. The Unauthorized Jackie Chan Encyclopedia noted that "Jackie Chan only choreographed the action for this forgettable movie about an orphaned youth who learns kung-fu from monks to avenge his father's death. Without JC's permission, the unscrupulous producers compiled a behind-the-scenes documentary about the making of this movie and released it as a "Jackie Chan" film."

Reviewer David Andrews of comicbookandmoviereviews.com gave the film a rating of B−, writing, "Overall '36 Crazy Fists' is what I what call a so-so film. The action was fine. The story was a silly one. And the concept behind it was very innovative too. It's just a shame that the rest of it wasn't much better, huh?"

The website hkfilm.net gave the film a rating of 4.5, concluding, "the fights are very solid -- nowhere close to Jackie's best work -- but they almost make the crap in between them interesting and/or funny. Almost. This is only really recommended for die-hard Jackie or old-school fans; most others will be frequently using the fast-forward button to get to the fights."

Reviewer Xristofl of rinkworks.com wrote, "This is the *best* bad movie I have ever seen. All the fight scenes were great because they were choreographed by Jackie Chan, but the acting, dialogue, and plot were terrible. This led to a thoroughly good time, because the parts that were good (the fights) were really good, and the parts that were bad (everything else) were really bad. Except for the fact that a few fights went on a little too long, I was never bored during this movie."
