= Emily Chu =

Hong Kong actress (born 1960)

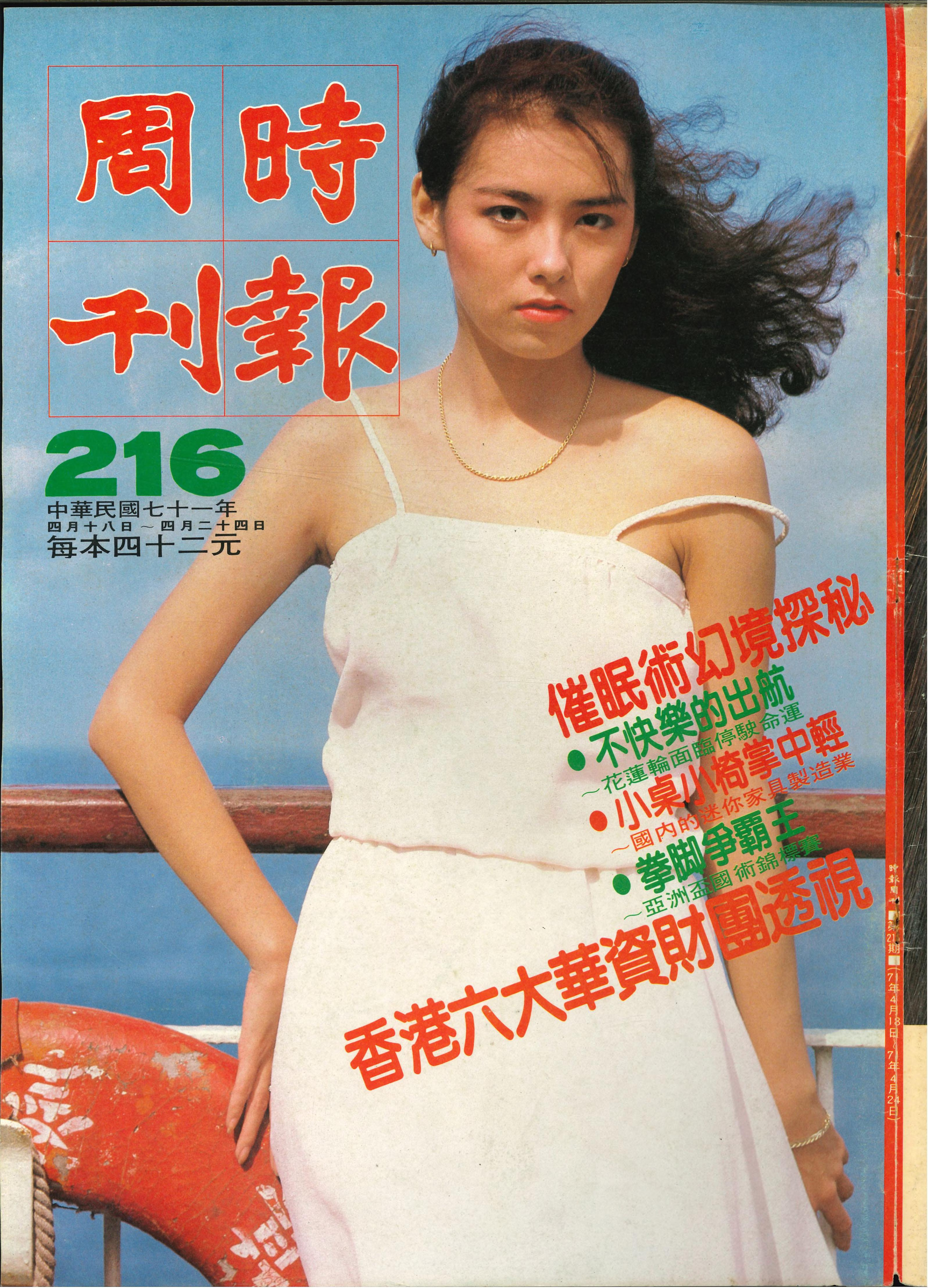
- Chu on a 1982 magazine cover
- Born: October 31, 1960 (age 65); Taipei, Taiwan
- Occupation: Actress
- Years active: 1983–1994

Chinese name
- Traditional Chinese: 朱寶意
- Simplified Chinese: 朱宝意
Transcriptions
Standard Mandarin
- Hanyu Pinyin: Zhū Bǎo Yì
Yue: Cantonese
- Jyutping: Zyu1 Bou2 Ji3

Emily Chu (Chinese: 朱寶意; born 31 October 1960) is a Hong Kong film actress. She was born in Taiwan.

== Partial filmography ==
- Jiu wan shi ba zhuan (1982)
- Duel of the Masters (1983)
- Funny Face (1985)
- Heart of Dragon (1985) - Jenny
- Millionaire's Express (1986) - Siu Bo
- Witch from Nepal (1986) - Sheila
- A Better Tomorrow (1986) - Jackie
- Scared Stiff (1987) - Alice
- Vampire's Breakfast (1987) - Angie Lin
- Flaming Brothers (1987)
- Rouge (1987) - Ah Chor
- Return of the Demon (1987) - Tayona
- A Better Tomorrow 2 (1987) - Jackie Sung
- The Big Brother (1987) - Randy
- Fortune Hunters (1987) - Yu Hau Ling
- Hai zi wang (1988)
- Devil Curse (1988) - Chan Che's wife
- Xin tiao shi ke (1989) - Wen
- Ying xiong wu dan (1989)
- Yi bu rong ci (1989)
- Qian nu yun yu qing (1989)
- Mission Recall (1990)
- Ghostly Love (1989)
- The Plot (1991)
- Bloody Hero (1991)
- Dignified Killers (1991)
- Angel or Whore (1991) - Eighteen Virgins
- The Spiritual Love (1991)
- Visa to Hell (1992)
- Magic Sword (1993) - (final film role)
