= Dangerous Encounters of the First Kind =

1980 Hong Kong film by Tsui Hark

- Theatrical release poster

Chinese name
- Traditional Chinese: 第一類型危險
- Simplified Chinese: 第一类型危险
Transcriptions
Standard Mandarin
- Hanyu Pinyin: Dì yī lèixíng wéixiǎn
Yue: Cantonese
- Jyutping: Dai^{6} jat^{1} Leoi^{6}jing^{4} Ngai^{4}him^{2}
- Directed by: Tsui Hark
- Screenplay by: Szeto Cheuk-hon; Tsui Hark
- Story by: Eddie Fong Ling-ching; Chen Fang; Szeto Cheuk-hon
- Produced by: Fung Wing-fat
- Starring: Lo Lieh; Lin Chen-chi; Albert Au; Lung Tin-sang; Che Biu-law; Ray Lui
- Cinematography: David Chung
- Edited by: Chow Cheung-kan; Woo Wai-chi
- Music by: Tang Siu-lam; Yu Leun
- Production company: Fotocine Film Production
- Release date: 4 December 1980 (HK)
- Running time: 100 minutes (uncut); 95 minutes (censored)
- Country: Hong Kong
- Language: Cantonese
- Box office: HK$2,248,034.5

Dangerous Encounters of the First Kind (Note: Titled on-screen as Dangerous Encounter—1st Kind) (Chinese: 第一類型危險, also released as Don't Play with Fire and Playing with Fire) is a 1980 Hong Kong crime thriller film directed and co-written by Tsui Hark. It follows a group of teenagers who engage in a crime spree in Hong Kong, but stumble into a dangerous group of international arms traffickers.

The initial cut of the film was banned for its violence (including unsimulated animal death) and allusions to the 1967 Hong Kong riots. Following the ban, the film was heavily re-shot and re-edited to comply with censors' demands. The censorship generated public interest in the film, that caused its retooled version to become a box office success in Hong Kong. It is considered part of the Hong Kong New Wave.

== Plot ==
Paul, Lung, and Ko are a trio of disaffected teenagers from different economic backgrounds. As a prank, Paul manufactures a bomb using a wristwatch and black powder, which the trio set off in a movie theatre, avoiding any casualties. Wan-chu, a sociopathic girl who spends her time torturing animals, sees them flee the theater and follows them but does not tell the police.

After being fired from her job, she argues with her older brother Tan, the police officer assigned to investigate the bombing, and impales a cat on a fence post out of anger. She forces her way into the trio by threatening to expose them to the police. Together, she forces them to commit various acts of criminality, including planting further bombs and hijacking a bus of tourists whom she forces to strip. When the boys try to abandon her, Wan-chu tries to set them on fire with gasoline, but is nearly hit by a car driven by an American man. In an ensuing fight, Wan-chu steals a package from his car filled with money orders for Japanese yen and accidentally drops a written contract in an alley without noticing.

The American is revealed to be a member of an arms trafficking ring made up of ex-Vietnam War servicemen. Their ringleader, Nigel, kills him for losing the contract. The youths fail to cash the money orders, first at a bank, and later threatening an exchange manager whom they try and fail to kill with a bomb when he brushes off their extortion. Tan links the two events, and Paul's face is shown on the news as a person of interest.

Wan-chu offers a deal to a local gang that previously harassed her and meets their leader, Uncle Hark. He takes Wan-chu and Ko to a banker who agrees to exchange 20 of the money orders into Hong Kong dollars for 30% of their amount, then Hark sends his gang to steal the money. During their escape, Lung throws the money at the gang to ward them off. Wan-chu is furious at him for losing the money, and the boys abandon her again. Hark and his gang attack her outside her apartment. Tan arrives and fends them off, but Wan-chu refuses to identify the men or press charges. In their apartment, Tan angrily beats her before tying her to the window bars with zip ties.

The gunrunners learn that Hark has one of their money orders, and kidnap and torture him until he tells them about Wan-chu. They attack her at her apartment, but are interrupted by Tan. In the ensuing struggle, Wan-chu falls and is impaled through the head by a fence post where she earlier killed a cat in the same way. The police find the remaining money orders hidden in Wan-chu's room, and Tan is taken off the case, his chief telling him that the Hong Kong government fears the political implications of the case.

When Paul's face is shown on TV in connection with the bombings, the three boys flee and hide out in a large cemetery crowded with gravestones, arguing among themselves. They later attempt to kill themselves by drinking Dettol. Paul and Lung spit it out but Ko swallows it, so Paul runs to a shop to buy milk to dilute the poison and is recognized by the seller. She contacts the police, and Tan rushes over. He handcuffs Tan to a post, then chases Paul through the gravestones. Just then, the gunrunners arrive, having tailed Tan.

A shootout ensues, Lung and Paul are both killed and Tan fatally wounded. Ko picks up a gun from the ground and shoots Nigel, but runs out of bullets. With his last ounce of strength, Tan grabs one of the dead gunrunner's assault rifles and kills Nigel. Ko picks up the gun and madly fires it into the cemetery, as a montage of photographs from the 1967 Hong Kong riots is shown.

The film ends with a flashback to one of the boys' more innocent pranks when they dropped a bag of red paint onto a pedestrian.

== Cast ==
- Lo Lieh as Tan
- Lin Chen-chi as Wan-chu
- Albert Au as Paul
- Lung Tin-sang as Lung
- Che Biu-law as Ko
- Ray Lui as Inspector Lui
- Nigel Falgate as Nigel
- Bruce Baron as Bruce
- Pierre Tremblay as Peter
- Richard Da Silva as Uncle Hark
- Fung Yun-Chuen as Paul's father
- Chu Shing-Choi as Paul's mother
- Nick Wai Kei Lam as Money launderer
- Lee Chun-Wa as Mr. Hong Kong
- David Wu as Tour guide
- Jimmy Shaw as Chief inspector

Uncut version only

- Deannie Yip as Police officer
- Yeung Yau-cheung as Bombing witness
- Fong Ping as Woman at identity parade

Censored version only

- Leong Po-Chih as Head Interpol officer
- John Sham, Stephen Shin, Ronny Yu, and Tsui Hark as Interpol officers
- Chong Man-ching as Social worker
- Yuen Wai-hung as Michelle
- Che Hung as Explosives dealer

== Production ==
Tsui Hark hired Lin Chen-Chi after seeing her work in films produced by Shaw Brothers Studio and noticing that her face was catlike.

The score for the film was taken from various sources including Goblin's soundtrack to George A. Romero's Dawn of the Dead and Jean-Michel Jarre's album Oxygène.

According to actor Pierre Tremblay, the actor playing the lead gunrunner Nigel was not a professional actor, but an off-duty Royal Hong Kong Police officer.

== Release and censorship ==
Hong Kong censors immediately banned the first version of the film for its violence and political content and forced a retooling of the film. In the original version, the teenagers make bombs and leave them in public places, a reference to the 1967 Hong Kong riots. The original ends with a montage of photographs of the archival photos of the riots. In the revised version, the teenagers are merely introduced as hit-and-run drivers. The film made HK$2,248,034.5.

The censored version of the film has a runtime of 95 minutes, while the uncut version has a runtime of 100 minutes, though both versions contain unique material (approx. 17 minutes in the original cut, and approx. 13 minutes in the theatrical cut). The revised version contains an added plotline about Interpol agents investigating the gunrunners. The publicity generated by the initial banning of the film generated interest in the film, ensuring large audiences for the censored version that was released in Hong Kong theaters.

For many years, the film's original version was considered lost, until Tsui Hark discovered a workprint on a VHS. The original film elements for this footage are thought to be lost.

=== Home media ===
The film was released on Blu-Ray by boutique label Cult Epics in June 2026, using a new 2K restoration of the film's theatrical cut. The release includes the film's theatrical cut, the original uncensored director's cut (using VHS excerpts for the missing footage), and a shortened English-language cut.

== Reception ==
=== Box office ===
The film was a success, becoming the 33rd-highest-grossing film at the Hong Kong box office in 1980.

=== Critical response ===
Many reviewers have written about the bleak, nihilistic nature of the film. In 1982, Peter Cowie wrote that the film is going "heavily for the shock-horror mould at present dominating much contemporary drama". In their 2014 book International Noir, Homer B. Petty and R. Barton Palmer cited the work an example of the "challenging works of the Hong Kong Noir Wave". On March 14, 2012, the Hong Kong edition of Time Out magazine published a list of the "100 Greatest Hong Kong Films," compiled by editor Edmund Lee to mark the centenary of Hong Kong cinema. Dangerous Encounters of the First Kind took the fifty-eighth spot.

In a review of the film's 2026 Blu-Ray release, Gabe Powers writes "In not matching genre expectations, Don’t Play with Fire also doesn’t obfuscate its themes behind genre trappings and period storytelling. It is an angry film and a political one, and, while it’s not a literal translation of any specific historical events, its politics are rooted in real-life, as well as Tsui’s own experiences as a Vietnamese-born expatriate who was studying in America during college anti-war and civil rights protests."
