= Witch from Nepal =

1986 Hong Kong film by Ching Siu-tung

- Film poster

Chinese name
- Traditional Chinese: 奇緣
- Simplified Chinese: 奇缘
Transcriptions
Standard Mandarin
- Hanyu Pinyin: Qí Yuán
Yue: Cantonese
- Jyutping: Kei4 Jyun4
- Directed by: Ching Siu-tung
- Written by: Tsui Ching-hong
- Produced by: Anthony Chow
- Starring: Chow Yun-fat; Emily Chu; Yammie Lam; Dick Wei
- Cinematography: Tom Lau
- Edited by: Peter Cheung
- Music by: Lam Manyee
- Production companies: Golden Harvest; Paragon Films
- Distributed by: Golden Harvest
- Release date: 27 February 1986 (Hong Kong)
- Running time: 89 minutes
- Country: Hong Kong
- Languages: Cantonese; Nepali
- Box office: HK$4,285,113

Witch from Nepal (奇緣) is a 1986 Hong Kong supernatural film directed by Ching Siu-tung. The film stars Chow Yun-fat as Joe Wong, an architect on vacation in Nepal with his girlfriend, Ida (Yammie Lam). Joe injures his leg and winds up in hospital, where he has dreams of a beautiful woman with magical powers. Joe is later in a hospital in Hong Kong with his leg infected, finding that the woman from his visions named Sheila (Emily Chu) magically heals him. Sheila is a good witch who gets Joe to return to Nepal to fight a cat-like demon with supernatural powers.

The film was part of a trend of supernatural film productions from Hong Kong about Chinese tourists in exotic South Asian locations. It grossed $4.2 million Hong Kong dollars on its theatrical run in Hong Kong. The film was nominated for two awards at the 6th Hong Kong Film Awards, where director Chin Siu-tung won the Best Action Choreography Award.

== Plot ==
While on vacation in Nepal, Joe Wong (Chow Yun-fat) and his girlfriend, Ida (Yammie Lam), ride an elephant when Joe falls and hurts his knee and is sent to a hospital. In a local hospital, Joe has visions of a beautiful veiled woman with mystical powers. Joe's leg later becomes infected and he finds himself in a hospital in Hong Kong, and finds the woman from his dreams earlier named Sheila (Emily Chu) magically healing his legs and granting him superhuman powers such as the ability to make large leaps through the air. Sheila reveals to Joe that she is a witch and that he has become a chosen one, to help defeat a demon for a Himalayan tribe who had their temple destroyed by the creature. Joe and Sheila begin to have an affair. Joe eventually meets up with the demon (Dick Wei) and the two have a clash at a temple. Sheila eventually sacrifices herself to save both Joe and Ida.

== Production ==
Witch from Nepal was director Ching Siu-tung's second film as a director after Duel to the Death (1983).

== Style ==
Witch from Nepal follows a trend of Hong Kong films at the time to have a plot about Chinese tourists in exotic South Asian locations such as Nepal, Thailand or Borneo such as The Seventh Curse. The film is a mixture of genres that include gothic horror, romance, comedy and mystery.

== Release ==
Witch from Nepal was released in Hong Kong on 27 February 1986. grossed a total of HK$4,285,113 The film has been released under several different English titles including The Nepal Affair, Affair from Nepal and A Touch of Love.

== Reception ==
At the 6th Hong Kong Film Awards, the film was nominated for Best Art Direction (James Leung) and Best Film Editing (Peter Cheung). Ching Siu-tung (Along with other three choreographers such as Philip Kwok, Alan Chui Chung-San and Lau Chi Hou) won the award for Best Action Choreography, beating other films nominees including Righting Wrongs and Peking Opera Blues.

== Notes ==
=== References ===
- O'Brien, Daniel (2003). Spooky Encounters : A Gwailo's Guide to Hong Kong Horror. Manchester: Headpress. ISBN 1900486318.
