= A Hearty Response =

1986 Hong Kong film by Norman Law

- Film poster
- Traditional Chinese: 義蓋雲天
- Simplified Chinese: 义盖云天
- Hanyu Pinyin: Yì Gài Yún Tiān
- Jyutping: Ji6 Koi3 Wan4 Tin1
- Directed by: Norman Law
- Screenplay by: Lai Man-cheuk
- Produced by: Alan Tang
- Starring: Chow Yun-fat; Joey Wong; David Lui
- Cinematography: Sung Kwong-wa
- Edited by: Poon Hung
- Music by: Danny Chung; Sherman Chow
- Production companies: Golden Harvest; The Wing-Scope Film Production
- Distributed by: Golden Harvest
- Release date: 30 October 1986
- Running time: 89 minutes
- Country: Hong Kong
- Language: Cantonese
- Box office: HK$13,461,667

A Hearty Response is a 1986 Hong Kong romantic comedy and action thriller film directed by Norman Law and starring Chow Yun-fat, Joey Wong and David Lui.

== Plot ==
Kong-sang is a mainland Chinese girl who illegally entered Hong Kong, hoping to retrieve her birth certificate, which proves that she was actually born in Hong Kong. She flees from her smuggler, Shing (Shum Wai), after she injures him when she was harassed by him.

Meanwhile, police detective Ho Ting-pong (Chow Yun-fat) is an upright and virtuous police officer who was assigned with his partner, Long Man (David Lui), to arrest drug dealer Addict Hung (Ng Hong-sang) in a supermarket. There, Long Man sees Kong-sang stealing from the supermarket and arrests her. As Ting-pong was distracted by this, Addict Hung manages to get on a car and runs over Kong-sang before fleeing.

After regaining consciousness in the hospital, Kong-sang feigns amnesia to avoid being repatriated and identifies Ting-pong as her husband. Since Ting-pong is a man of chivalry, he takes Kong-sang home and takes care of her. Ting-pong's mother (Lee Heung-kam) is really fond of Kong-sang and sees her as an ideal daughter-in-law. However, when Ting-pong's mother convinces him into letting Kong-sang stay, Kong-sang leaves to wander in the streets, not wanting to give Ting-pong a hard time to face his girlfriend. After going through many trials and tribulations, Ting-pong and Kong-sang eventually fall in love. As everything is seemingly going well, Shing reappears and kidnaps Kong-sang.

== Cast ==
- Chow Yun-fat as Ho Ting-pong
- Joey Wong as Kong-sang
- David Lui as Long Man
- Kent Cheng as Policeman outside bank (cameo)
- Wong Wan-si as Auntie Wan (cameo)
- Paul Chun as Chief Inspector Lui Tak
- Poon Lai-yin as Judy
- Lee Heung-kam as Ho Ting-pong's mother
- Shum Wai as Shing
- Felix Lok as Restaurant manager
- Ng Hong-sang as Addict Hung
- Chiu Chi-ling as Doctor
- Siao San-yan as Wan's husband
- Ng Kwok-kin as Policeman
- Fei Pak as Policeman
- Danny Tang
- Leo Tsang
- Lung Ying

== Reception ==
=== Critical ===
LoveHKFilm gave the film a mixed review describing the film as "forgettable", with "some decent moments." Hong Kong Film Net gave the film a score of 5 out of 10 criticizing director Norman Law's direction and its unfunny comedy, but noting the good chemistry of Chow Yun-fat and Joey Wong.

=== Box office ===
The film grossed HK$13,461,667 at the Hong Kong box office during its theatrical run from 10 October to 20 November 1986.

== See also ==
- Chow Yun-fat filmography
