= Where's Officer Tuba? =

1986 Hong Kong film by Philip Chan and Ricky Lau

- Film poster
- Traditional Chinese: 霹靂大喇叭
- Simplified Chinese: 霹雳大喇叭
- Hanyu Pinyin: Pī Lì Dà Lǎ Bā
- Jyutping: Pik1 Lik1 Daai3 Laa3 Baa1
- Directed by: Philip Chan; Ricky Lau
- Screenplay by: Barry Wong
- Produced by: Sammo Hung
- Starring: Sammo Hung; Jacky Cheung; David Chiang; Joey Wong
- Cinematography: Andrew Lau; Ma Koon-wah; Derek Wan; Arthur Wong
- Edited by: Peter Cheung
- Music by: Danny Chung; Tang Siu-lam
- Production company: D&B Films
- Distributed by: D&B Films Company Ltd
- Release date: 20 March 1986
- Running time: 93 minutes
- Country: Hong Kong
- Language: Cantonese
- Box office: HK$16,822,229

Where's Officer Tuba? (Chinese: 霹靂大喇叭) is a 1986 Hong Kong action comedy film directed by Philip Chan and Ricky Lau. The screenplay was written by Barry Wong, and starring Sammo Hung, who also produced the film. The film co-stars Jacky Cheung, David Chiang, and Joey Wong. The film was later remade as Look Out, Officer! in 1990 starring Stephen Chow.

In the film, a timid police officers promises to avenge his dying sergeant. When he reneges on his promise, the sergeant's ghost haunts him and interferes in his daily life.

== Plot ==
Police Officer Tuba is a timid man who would rather play in the police band than get involved in any real police work. The precincts' most decorated officer, Sergeant Rambo Chow, decides to use Tuba in an undercover operation that goes disastrously wrong when Chow is killed. He makes Tuba promise to get the criminals to avenge him before he dies, and Tuba reluctantly agrees but does not really intend to keep his promise.

He later teams up with rookie cop Cheung. Tuba has forgotten his promise, until the ghost of Chow comes back to haunt him. Interfering in his work and his private life, especially his budding romance with Joanne so that everyone starts to think that Tuba is going crazy. With Tuba the only person who can see or hear the ghost, he finds he has to listen, otherwise, he could be tormented by his unwanted spiritual visitor for the rest of his life.

== Cast ==
- Sammo Hung as Officer Tuba
- Jacky Cheung as Cheung
- David Chiang as Sergeant Rambo Chow
- Joey Wong as Joanne
- Stanley Fung as police band drummer
- Paul Chun as police band trumpet player
- Paul Chang as Chung
- Bowie Wu as Sau
- Teddy Yip as Joanne's father
- Tai Po as drug addict
- Melvin Wong as Rambo's superior officer
- Lam Ching-ying as Taoist priest (cameo)
- Yuen Wah as Extortion gang member
- Corey Yuen as Taoist priest in deity Chun Kui costume
- Tin Ching as Tuba's superior officer
- David Wu as rapist in park
- Dennis Chan as Sergeant assigning job
- Alfred Cheung as man at pier/telephone boot
- Hwang Jang-lee as Extortion gang member
- Chang Yi as Extortion gang leader
- Ka Lee as crazy man with chopper
- Kam Piu as Chairman Kan
- Chiu Chi-ling as mental patient
- Billy Chan as wanted thug
- Yuen Miu as cop arresting wanted man
- Siu Tak-foo as cop arresting wanted man
- Seung Yee as Joanne's mother
- Lo Hung as Police station chief
- John Shum as man taking pictures on pier
- Chan King as man on pier
- Lau Hok-nin as van driver
- Chun Kwai-po as cop arresting wanted man
- Cheung Wing-cheung
- Lo Sai-kwan as Extortion gang member
- David Lo as David
- Ken Boyle as Commissioner Tones
- Tsui Oi-sam
- Kwan Chi-piu
- Shrila Chun
- Chong Man-ching
- Angela Yu Chien
- Chow Lai-kuen as undercover cop
- Dick Son
- Yeung Wai-ling
- Helen Au
- Bolo Yeung
- Hui Yat-wah
- Ting Tung
- Garry Chan as Extortion gang member
- Chang Sing-kwong

== Box office ==
The film grossed HK$16,822,229 at the Hong Kong box office during its theatrical run from 20 March to 9 April 1986 in Hong Kong.

== See also ==
- Jacky Cheung filmography
- Sammo Hung filmography
