= Love Unto Waste =

1986 Hong Kong film by Stanley Kwan

- Film poster
- Traditional Chinese: 地下情
- Simplified Chinese: 地下情
- Hanyu Pinyin: Dì Xià Qíng
- Jyutping: Dei6 Haa6 Cing4
- Directed by: Stanley Kwan
- Screenplay by: Yau-tai On-ping; Lai Kit
- Story by: Lai Kit; Riley Yip
- Produced by: Vicki Lee Leung
- Starring: Tony Leung; Irene Wan; Elaine Jin; Tsai Chin; Chow Yun-fat; Elaine Chow; Winnie Yu
- Cinematography: Johnny Koo
- Edited by: Chow Seung-kang
- Music by: Violet Lam
- Production companies: D&B Films; Pearl City Film Production
- Distributed by: D&B Films
- Release date: 30 August 1986
- Running time: 96 minutes
- Country: Hong Kong
- Language: Cantonese
- Box office: HK$5,088,061

Love Unto Waste is a 1986 Hong Kong drama film directed by Stanley Kwan and starring Tony Leung, Irene Wan, Elaine Jin, Tsai Chin, Chow Yun-fat with guest appearances by Elaine Chow and Winnie Yu.

== Plot ==
Chao Su-ling and Liu Suk-ping are two young women from Taiwan striving to make a living in Hong Kong. Like Hong Kong model Billie, they both share the dream of becoming stars, but their careers remain stagnant. In their loneliness, they cross paths with Tony, the son of a rice shop owner, and together they embark on a reckless and fleeting love affair of youthful indulgence.

A notorious playboy, Tony chooses not to pursue a relationship with Ms. Chung, the female manager of the rice shop. Instead, he quickly moves in with Billie, and the two become entangled in a passionate romance. One night, tragedy strikes when Suk-ping discovers that Su-ling has been murdered. Overcome with grief, she seeks comfort in Tony, leading to yet another fateful entanglement between them.

== Cast ==
- Tony Leung Chiu-Wai as Tony Cheung, the main protagonist and a rice shop owner
- Irene Wan as Billie Yuen, a model
- Elaine Jin as Liu Suk-ping, a film actress
- Tsai Chin as Chao Su-ling, a lounge singer from Taiwan
- Chow Yun-fat as Inspector Lan
- Elaine Chow as Ms. Chung, Tony's rice shop staff
- Winnie Yu
- Yip Koon-chip as Tony's father

== Awards and nominations ==
- 6th Hong Kong Film Awards
  - Won: Best Supporting Actress (Elaine Jin)
  - Won: Best Screenplay (Lai Kit, Yau-tai On-ping)
  - Nominated: Best Film
  - Nominated: Best Director (Stanley Kwan)
  - Nominated: Best Actor (Tony Leung)
  - Nominated: Best Supporting Actor (Chow Yun-fat)
  - Nominated: Best Supporting Actress (Tsai Chin)
  - Nominated: Best Original Film Score (Violet Lam)
  - Nominated: Best Original Film Song (地下情之 Composer: Violet Lam, Lyricist: Fong Wai-kwong, Performer: Tsai Chin)

== See also ==
- Chow Yun-fat filmography
