= Paul Chun =

Hong Kong actor

- 秦沛
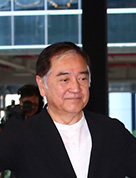
- Chun in 2019
- Born: Chiang Chang-nien; 17 May 1945 (age 81); Shanghai, Republic of China
- Other name: Paul Gor (Paul哥)
- Occupation: Actor
- Years active: 1948–present
- Height: 1.73 m (5 ft 8 in)
- Spouse: Thelma Leung (divorced)
- Children: Benji Chiang (son); Lesley Chiang (daughter)
- Parents: Yan Fa (father); Hung Wei (mother)
- Relatives: David Chiang (brother); Yim Wai (sister); Derek Yee (half-brother)
- Awards: Hong Kong Film Awards – Best Supporting Actor; 1986 The Lunatics; 1994 C'est la vie, mon chéri Golden Horse Awards – Best Supporting Actor; 1986 The Lunatics TVB Anniversary Awards – My Favourite Powerhouse Actor now named: Best Supporting Actor; 2003 The King of Yesterday and Tomorrow; My Favourite Television Character; 2002 Family Man; Life Achievement Award; 2008 Lifetime Achievement

Chinese name
- Chinese: 秦沛
Transcriptions
Standard Mandarin
- Hanyu Pinyin: Qín Pèi

Chiang Chang-nien
- Chinese: 姜昌年
Transcriptions
Standard Mandarin
- Hanyu Pinyin: Jiāng Chāngnián

Paul Chun (Chinese: 秦沛; Jyutping: ceon4 pui3; pinyin: Qín Pèi; born 17 May 1945) is a Hong Kong actor. He has appeared in more than 130 films and television series since 1949. In 1966, he appeared in The Sand Pebbles, an American film produced and directed by Robert Wise.

== Early and personal life ==
He was born as Chiang Chang-nien (Chinese: 姜昌年; pinyin: Jiāng Chāngnián) in Shanghai, China on 17 May 1945. His father was Yan Fa (嚴化) and his mother was Hung Wei (紅薇). Both of his parents were renowned actors.

He is the older brother of actor David Chiang and actress Yim Wai (嚴慧). His half-brother is actor and director Derek Yee Tung-Shing. He was married to Thelma Leung (梁盛子). His son Benji Chiang (姜文杰) and his daughter Lesley Chiang (姜麗文) comprise the pop music duo, Benji and Lesley.

== Career ==
In 1949, at age three, Chun started his acting career as a child actor. From 1949 to 1954, Chun appeared in many films such as Chun lei (1949) directed by Li Pingqian and Dang fu xin (1949) directed by Feng Yueh (aka Griffin Yueh Feng).

In 1966, Chun (credited as Paul Chinpae) appeared as Cho-jen in The Sand Pebbles (1966), an American film produced and directed by Robert Wise. In The Sand Pebbles, Chun was a young militant student killed by Machinist's Mate 1st Class Jake Holman (played by Steve McQueen).

In 2010, Chun was the director with Cheyton Jain as co-director in The Chair, the Box, and the Broom (2010), a short film. In 2011, Chun was the director of Earth (2011), an animation short film about a giant robot shooting at some buildings.

== Filmography ==
=== Television series ===
Year	Title	Role	Network	Notes
1976	The Legend of the Condor Heroes	Yeung Tit-sam	CTV	
1976	The Return of the Condor Heroes	Mou Sam-tung	CTV	
1980	Fatherland	Tong Bing-fun	ATV	
1981	Hong Kong '81		TVB	
1982	You Only Live Twice	Nip Man-fung	TVB	
1982	The Legend of the Condor Heroes	Genghis Khan	TVB	
1985	The Young Wanderer		TVB	
1985	The Rough Ride		TVB	
1985	Legend Of The General Who Never Was	Cheung Si Kwai	TVB	
1985	The Battlefield		TVB	
1985	The Yang's Saga		TVB	
1985	The Possessed		TVB	
1985	Happy Spirit		TVB	
1985	Take Care, Your Highness!	Yuti	TVB	
1986	The Feud of Two Brothers		TVB	
1987	Police Cadet '88		TVB	
1989	The Legend of Master Chan		TVB	
1989	Two of A Kind		TVB	
1989	Father and Son		ATV	
1990	The Real Pals		ATV	
1990	Love Is Like Oxygen		ATV	
1990	Housekeeper, My Honey		ATV	
1990	Radio III		ATV	
1991	The Cop's Affairs		ATV	
1991	Who's the Winner		ATV	
1992	All in One Family		ATV	
1992	Who's the Winner 2		ATV	
1993	Gun and Glory		ATV	
1994	The Movie Tycoon		ATV	
1994	Heroic Legend of the Yang's Family		ATV	
1996	The Little Vagrant Lady		ATV	
1996	The Good Old Days	Fong Sai-faan	ATV	
1997	The Swordsman		ATV	
1997	A Recipe for the Heart	Chun Maan-shek	TVB	
1998	Journey to the West II	Maitreya, Elephant Demon	TVB	
1998	Moments of Endearment	Chung Ji Wai	TVB	
1999	At the Threshold of an Era	Yip Hao-Lai	TVB	
2000	At the Threshold of an Era II	Yip Hao-Lai	TVB	
2002	Family Man	Ko Hai	TVB	Nominated - TVB Award for Best Actor (Top 5)
2002	Doomed to Oblivion	Kangxi	TVB	
2003	The King of Yesterday and Tomorrow		TVB	TVB Award for Best Supporting Actor
2004	Shine on You	Ga Wa Beu	TVB	
2005	Love Bond	Gei Tin-man	TVB	Nominated - TVB Award for Best Supporting Actor (Top 5)
2005	Life Made Simple	Chung Kam-Wing	TVB	
2006	Love Guaranteed	Kwok Sing	TVB	Nominated - TVB Award for Best Supporting Actor
2006	Glittering Days	Chu Dai-gut	TVB	Nominated - TVB Award for Best Supporting Actor (Top 5)
2007	Life Art	Yum Ching-cheun	TVB	
2008	Wasabi Mon Amour	Ko Shau	TVB	Nominated - TVB Award for Best Supporting Actor
2008	The Master of Tai Chi		TVB	
2008	The Silver Chamber of Sorrows	Sheung Hang	TVB	
2008-2009	Pages of Treasures	Fong Hok Man	TVB	
2009	Born Rich	Chow Shun-Shing	TVB	
2009	Black & White	Head of San-Lian Hui	PTS	
2009	Memoirs Of Madam Jin	Sheng Wenda	JiangsuTV	
2010-2011	Show Me the Happy	Kot Yat-dou	TVB	
2012	Witness Insecurity		TVB	
2013	Hot Mom!			
2013	Love in Trouble			
2015	Looking for Aurora			
2017	Sweet Guy			
2018	Shadow of Justice	Kan Cheuk-ting	ViuTV	
2019	Unforgettable Impression		MangoTV	
2019	I Bet Your Pardon	Pong Fung	TVB	
2019	Go Go Squid!	Grandpa Han	DragonTV	
2019	Second Time is A Charm		DragonTV	
2020	The Gutter	Ho Wing Cheong	ViuTV	
2020	Legal Mavericks 2020	James Kan Siu-wang	TVB	
2021	Dt.Appledog's Time	Grandpa Han	iQIYI	
2021	Moonlight	Mr. Xia	iQIYI	
2021	Once Given Never Forgotten	Uncle Yuan	iQIYI	
TBA	Finding Mr. Right			
TBA	So Young			
TBA	My Deepest Dream			
TBA	South Wind Knows My Mood		Youku	

=== Feature film ===
Year	Title	Role	Notes/Ref.
2024	The Last Dance	Ming	
2021	Dynasty Warriors	Wang Yun	
2020	Love After Love	sir Qiao Cheng	
2019	Hypnotize the Jury		
2019	Sheep Without a Shepherd	Song En	
2018	The Trough		
2017	The Dreaming Man	Father	
2017	Love Off the Cuff	Cherie's father	
2017	Super Teacher		
2016	My Ten Million		
2016	Book of Love		Nominated - Hong Kong Film Award for Best Supporting Actor
2015	Distance		
2014	Ameera		
2012	The Great Magician		
2011	A Simple Life		
2010	Echoes of the Rainbow		
2010	Don Quixote		
2009	Shinjuku Incident	Uncle Tak	
2006	Karmic Mahjong	Qin Long-sheng	
2004	PaPa Loves You	Professor Mak	
2003	Lost in Time	Siu Wai's Dad	
2000	China Strike Force	Sheriff Lin	
2000	The Teacher Without Chalk		
2000	Don't Look Back... Or You'll Be Sorry!!	Elvis Siu	
1999	Super Car Criminals		
1998	Young and Dangerous 5	Datuk Chan Ka-Nam	
1996	Viva Erotica	Boss Wong	
1995	Full Throttle	Paul	
1995	One and a Half		
1995	Great Adventurers	Ray Lui	
1994	Fist of Legend	Uncle Nong Jinsun	
1994	C'est la vie, mon chéri	Uncle/Cheung Po-Tsai	Hong Kong Film Award for Best Supporting Actor
1994	Love on Delivery	Chan	
1994	Return to a Better Tomorrow	Fred Simon	
1993	Executioners	Colonel	
1993	The Heroic Trio	Chief of Police	
1993	Fight Back to School III	Mr. Hung 'King of Gamblers'	
1993	The Bare-Footed Kid	Teacher Hua	
1993	Legal Innocence	Prosecutor	
1993	The Kidnap of Wong Chak Fai	Wong Chat-Fai	
1993	Bogus Cops	Doctor	
1992	Arrest the Restless	Ngan Tung	
1992	Heart Against Hearts	Edmond Tang	
1992	What a Hero!	Lan's Father	
1992	Best of the Best	Ngan Kwan	
1992	A Moment of Romance II	Frank's Father	
1992	Casino Tycoon	Wong Chang	
1992	Royal Tramp II	King Ng Sam Kwai	
1992	Lee Rock III		
1992	Royal Tramp	Ng Sam Kwai 吳三桂	
1992	Justice, My Foot!	Inspector General	
1991	Lee Rock II	Ngan Tung	
1991	Lee Rock	Ngan Tung	
1991	Fantasy Romance	Li/Lemon Head	
1991	The Raid	Lieutenant Mang Tai-Hoi	
1991	Bury Me High	Nguen	
1991	The Gambling Ghost	Gambler	
1991	Fight Back to School	Lam	
1991	Top Bet	Hung Kwong	
1990	Front Page	Dr. Pong	
1990	All for the Winner	Wong Hung Kwong	
1990	Pantyhose Hero	Captain	
1990	Best Friend of the Cops	Pao Pu-Ping	
1989	Tragic Heroes	Tsou	
1989	Wild Search	Mr. Hung	
1989	The Final Judgement	Stanley Wu Tai Kit	
1989	The Yuppie Fantasia	Mr. Chan (Ann's boyfriend)	
1988	Profiles of Pleasure	Chu	
1988	Double Fattiness	Kum Dai Tse	
1988	I Love Maria	Police Captain	
1988	In the Line of Duty III	Inspector Cameron Chuen	
1988	Bet on Fire	Tong Pun	
1987	People's Hero		
1987	Spiritual Love	Pu's Boss	
1987	The Wrong Couples		
1986	Rosa	Paul Tien	
1986	A Hearty Response	Lui Tak	
1986	Immortal Story		
1986	Peking Opera Blues	Fa Gum-Sao	Nominated - Hong Kong Film Award for Best Supporting Actor
1986	The Lunatics	Tsuen	Hong Kong Film Award for Best Supporting Actor; Golden Horse Awards for Best Supporting Actor
1986	Where's Officer Tuba?	Trumpet player	
1986	Royal Warriors	Chubby escort policeman	
1985	The Battlefield	Hung Leung	
1985	Let's Make Laugh II	Mr. Xiao Quanshi	
1985	It's a Drink, It's a Bomb!	Befuddled Cop	
1984	The Young Wanderer		
1984	Hong Kong 1941	Sergeant Fa Wing	
1984	Rainbow Around My Shoulder		
1984	Heaven Can Help	Shek	
1984	Double Trouble		
1983	All the Wrong Spies aka Wo ai Ye Laixiang	Fat Pig - Commissioner of Police	
1981	No One Is Innocent		
1981	The Six Directions of Boxing		
1981	To Hell with the Devil	Priest	
1981	Dangerous Person	Commissioner	
1981	The Legend of the Owl	Knight	
1980	The Lost Kung Fu Secrets		
1979	Raining in the Mountain	Hui Ssu	
1979	Dance of Death	Ku Cheng-yuan	
1978	Breakout from Oppression		
1978	Killers Two		
1977	Jackie Chan's Bloodpact	Chu Shan Feng	
1976	I Want More!		
1975	7 Soldiers of Kung Fu	Hua Rong	
1975	The Sharp Fists of Kung Fu	Yang Hu	
1974	The Drug Addicts	Police Officer Tang Kuo-Liang	
1974	Mad World of Fools	Sing Kee twin no. 1	
1973	Black Belt	Tommy	
1973	Death on the Docks		
1973	Breakout from Oppression		
1972	The Yellow Killer	Li	
1972	Fourteen Amazons	4th prince	
1972	Water Margin	Hua Yung	
1972	Pursuit!	Lu Chien	
1971	Sunset	Chen Zhongkang	
1971	The Yellow Muffler	Huang Peilin	
1969	Famous Swordsman Tin Kiu		
1969	Sky Dragon Castle		
1969	The Joys and Sorrows of Youth		
1968	Unicorn Fortress		
1968	Three Young Girls		
1968	The Magnificent Five		
1966	The Sand Pebbles	Cho-jen	
1953	Parents' Love		
