= The Lunatics =

1986 Hong Kong film by Derek Yee

- Film poster
- 癲佬正傳
- Directed by: Yee Tung-Shing
- Written by: Yee Tung-Shing
- Produced by: John Sham Kin-Fun
- Cinematography: Wilson Chan Pui-Ka
- Edited by: Cheung Kwok-Kuen
- Music by: Philip Chan Fei-Lit; Tang Siu-Lam
- Production company: D&B Films Co. Ltd.
- Release date: 5 June 1986; (Hong Kong)
- Running time: 87 minutes
- Country: Hong Kong
- Language: Cantonese
- Box office: HK$9,350,070

The Lunatics (Chinese: 癲佬正傳; Jyutping: din1 lou2 zing3 zyun6) is a 1986 Hong Kong drama film written and directed by Yee Tung-Shing in his directorial debut.

== Plot ==
A mentally ill man named Doggie causes a disturbance while playing at a fish market when the police think that he has taken a woman hostage with a cleaver. Mr. Tsui arrives and calms the situation down enough so that Doggie can be taken into custody. Miss Lau, a Hong Kong journalist, observes this and becomes interested in the work of Mr. Tsui, a psychiatrist who donates his time to help the mentally ill, many of them living on the streets.

Together, Mr. Tsui and Miss Lau visit Tsuen, a patient who claims to be rehabilitated. Tsuen says that the Castle Peak mental health facility is nice but upon release it is easy for patients to forget to take their medication in their new environment. He has been out and living in his own place for a year but his wife has left him and only allows him one supervised visit with his young son per month. Tsuen asks Mr. Tsui to help him gain more time with his son, but Mr. Tsui reminds him that it is a court decision.

Chung, a chainsmoker who collects cigarette butts from ashtrays, flees when he sees Mr. Tsui coming. Mr. Tsui follows him back to his shanty, where his daughter has measles. They bring her to the hospital, where Mr. Tsui asks Chung about his son. Chung insists that he did not kill his son and leads Mr. Tsui and the police to a spot in the woods where his son is buried. Mr. Tsui confronts Ah Ming, a doctor who prescribed medicine for hepatitis to Chung but did not know that it was intended for his son. Ah Ming explains that he witnessed the birth of Chung's children and has always cared for them.

Tsuen attempts to take Ah Hei on an unscheduled trip to the store for his birthday but his ex-wife catches him and chastises Ah Hei's teacher Miss Li for allowing it to happen. A physical confrontation arises between Tsuen and his ex-wife's new husband, after which his ex-wife says that she will file an injunction against Tsuen's visitation rights. Tsuen returns home with a bump on his head and begins talking to himself and breaking the necks of chickens brought to him by his mother, who eventually agrees to take him to the hospital when she finds him crouching in the shower biting into a chicken.

At the hospital, Tsuen puts on a good show in front of the doctor and is released without being sent to Castle Peak, but outside the hospital he disappears for several hours before Mr. Tsui finds him. Intending to bring change from the government by raising public awareness of the issue of inadequate healthcare for mentally ill people, Miss Lau writes a story for the newspaper about Tsuen's routine of breaking the necks of chickens in an unsuccessful attempt to get him accepted into the hospital. This however backfires, causing his neighbors to form a mob and confront Tsuen at his apartment. They begin yelling at Tsuen's mother and Tsuen attempts to defend her with meat cleavers, leading to a chaotic confrontation in which many people are hurt, including Tsuen's mother.

Tsuen flees to his son's school and locks the door behind him. The mob bangs on the door and Miss Li attempts to open it to escape, causing Tsuen to kill her with a cleaver. A policeman breaks through a window but Tsuen kills him with the cleaver so Mr. Tsui grabs the policeman's gun and shoots Tsuen.

Mr. Tsui attempts to resign but his boss doesn't want to accept his resignation because he is the only social worker left on his side. He is then informed that Doggie's parents called to say that he wants to commit suicide. Mr. Tsui finds him at the fish market, but when a photographer uses a flash bulb Doggie becomes alarmed and swings a cleaver into Mr. Tsui, killing him. Mr. Tsui's patients and acquaintances attend his funeral, after which Miss Lau begins looking after the mentally ill on the streets of Hong Kong.

== Cast ==
- Fung Shui-Fan as Mr. Tsui
- Deannie Ip as Tina Lau
- Paul Chun Pui as Tsuen
- Chow Yun-Fat as Chung
- John Sham Kin-Fun as Dr. Shum
- Tony Leung Chiu-wai as Doggie
- Season Ma as Miss Li
- Dennis Chan as Ming
- Ma Suk-Jan as crazy old woman
- Lai Suen as Tsuen's mother
- Lo Hung as doctor examining Tsuen
- Cheung Hei as lunatic friend
- Wan Seung-Lam as Zhao
- Lui Hung as customer of Zhao
- Jeffrey Ho Wai-Lung as new husband of Tsuen's ex-wife
- Ng Kwok-Kin as policeman
- Cho Yuen-Tat as journalist
- Cheung Bing-Chuen as angry tenant

== Reception ==
Reviewer Andrew Saroch of fareastfilms.com gave the film 5/5 stars, calling it "quite simply one of the most important films to come out of Hong Kong and certainly one of the most harrowing", "essential viewing for every film buff", and "a superb mixture of social conscience and expert film-making."

TV Guide gave the film 3/4 stars, calling it "a well-made, consciousness-raising film whose theme is frequently overlooked in the movies: mental illness."

In his book A Different Brilliance: The D&B Story, author Po Fung wrote, "adopting a social realist approach, The Lunatics offered a gritty portrayal of the dismal living conditions of one of the most marginalised groups in Hong Kong known as the mentally ill."

== Awards and nominations ==
Awards and nominations
Ceremony	Category	Recipient	Outcome
Chicago International Film Festival	Gold Hugo	Yee Tung-Shing	Nominated
6th Hong Kong Film Awards	Best Supporting Actor	Paul Chun	Won
6th Hong Kong Film Awards	Best Art Direction	Yank Wong	Won
6th Hong Kong Film Awards	Best Film	The Lunatics	Nominated
6th Hong Kong Film Awards	Best Director	Yee Tung-Shing	Nominated
6th Hong Kong Film Awards	Best Screenplay	Yee Tung-Shing	Nominated
23rd Golden Horse Awards	Golden Horse Award for Best Supporting Actor	Paul Chun	Won
23rd Golden Horse Awards	Golden Horse Award for Best Feature Film	D & B Films Co. Ltd.	Nominated
