= Peking Opera Blues =

1986 Hong Kong film by Tsui Hark

- Film poster
- Traditional Chinese: 刀馬旦
- Simplified Chinese: 刀马旦
- Literal meaning: Knife Horse Actresses
Transcriptions
Standard Mandarin
- Hanyu Pinyin: Dāo Mǎ Dàn
Yue: Cantonese
- Yale Romanization: Dòu Máah Dáan
- Jyutping: Dou^{1} Maa^{5} Daan^{2}
- Directed by: Tsui Hark
- Written by: Raymond To
- Produced by: Tsui Hark
- Starring: Brigitte Lin; Cherie Chung; Sally Yeh; Paul Chun; Wu Ma; Kenneth Tsang
- Cinematography: Hang Sang Poon
- Edited by: David Wu
- Music by: James Wong Jim
- Production companies: Film Workshop; Cinema City
- Distributed by: Golden Princess Film Production
- Release date: 6 September 1986 (HK)
- Running time: 104 minutes
- Country: Hong Kong
- Language: Cantonese

Peking Opera Blues (Chinese: 刀馬旦; lit. 'Knife Horse Actresses') is a 1986 Hong Kong period action comedy film directed and produced by Tsui Hark, and starring Brigitte Lin, Cherie Chung, Sally Yeh, Paul Chun, Wu Ma, and Kenneth Tsang. The film combines action comedy with scenes involving Peking Opera.

The plot follows Tsao Wan, the daughter of a general and a devoted patriot, who is torn between her love for the nation and her loyalty to her father, who aids Yuan Shikai in securing massive foreign loans that push the country further into financial despair. Meanwhile, Bai Niu, who grew up in an opera troupe, and Sheung Hung, a money-hungry courtesan, cross paths with Tsao Wan through fate. Together, their intertwined lives weave an epic tale of love, sacrifice, and patriotism, as they embark on a daring journey in the midst of political chaos.

Peking Opera Blues was nominated in six categories at the 7th Hong Kong Film Awards, including Best Actress for Sally Yeh.

== Plot ==
Corrupt General Tun escapes from his mansion with his wives and children after losing his assets to General Tsao in a game of mahjong. Amidst the chaos, Sheung Hung, a wandering musician, obtains a box of precious jewelleries and escapes. She bumps into Tsao Wan during an inspection by General Tsao's soldiers, and loses the box in the process.

Sheung Hung follows the box to an opera theatre, where Tsao Wan meets with Pak-hoi to thwart her father's plans in securing foreign loans to amass power and restore the Qing monarchy. In an attempt to escape a strange man's harassment, Sheung Hung unknowingly hides in Tsao Wan's car trunk. Commander Looi, the head of the powerful auditing bureau, bullies the theatre owner into bribing him for bogus suspicious activities.

Back home from the theatre, Tsao Wan eavesdrops on her father's meeting with foreign bankers, and discovers the location of the key to the safe containing the signed loan documents. Because of Pak-hoi's premature intervening, they fail to steal the documents, and are forced to escape with Sheung Hung and Tung Man, a soldier who got injured from saving Pak-hoi. They seek refuge at Bai Niu's home that she shares with her father and his opera troupe, and is able to save Tung Man's life thanks to Tsao Wan's surgical skills.

Days later, Tsao Wan brings her father to the opera theatre, where Pak-hoi and Tung Man awaits to steal the key from him when he's in the toilet from food poisoning. Their plan fails when Commander Looi and his men intervene, and a gunfight breaks out in the theatre, resulting in Pak-hoi and Tung Man's escape, and the theatre's closure. Shaken from the ordeal, Tsao Wan invites Bai Niu and Sheung Hung, who somehow ended up performing on stage that night, to her home for drinks. General Tsao takes an interest in his daughter's friends, and upon finding out they were the performers from earlier that day, arranges for them to perform for him the following night. Both women spend the day preparing for the show, while Tsao Wan, Pak-hoi, and Tung Man bribe Sheung Hung to drug General Tsao when he invites them home to spend the night, without letting Bai Niu in on the plan.

Despite Sheung Hung's best efforts, Bai Niu ends up knocking out General Tsao with a vase, giving Tsao Wan enough time to steal the key and obtain the loan documents. Sheung Hung, greedy for more money, keeps half the document as leverage. In the ensuing argument, Bai Niu berates them for their schemes and greed, and angrily leaves. As Tsao Wan is leaving with the entire document in hand, Sheung Hung is attacked by the strange man from before, but Tsao Wan rescues her. They discover that the man is a spy for the auditing buraeu. Back at the opera theatre, Bai Niu finds her father and the opera troupe missing. Pak-hoi shows up and tells her that General Tsao is looking for her and Sheung Hung, and escapes with her. While leaving the theatre, they bump into Sheung Hung, who passes the document to Pak-hoi, and informs them that Tsao Wan had returned home as her identity might have been exposed. They are interrupted by General Tsao's men, who capture Pak-hoi and Tung Man.

Back at the mansion, General Tsao orders Tsao Wan to pack her bags and escape together, after finding out that the loan documents are missing. Tsao Wan manages to free Mr. Wong and the opera troupe from prison, but before she could escape with her father, the auditing bureau shows up to arrest her. Refusing to believe that his daughter is an insurgent, General Tsao defends her and is murdered by Commander Looi.

Commander Looi captures Tsao Wan and tortures her for information on the stolen documents, with the help of General Tun, who returned after General Tsao's death. The perverted General Tun orders Tsao Wan to be tied up in his bedroom for his enjoyment, but on his way there, he is greeted by two mysterious guests: Sheung Hung and Bai Niu. Sheung Hung seduces the general in his bedroom, and accidentally kills him in the process, then frees Tsao Wan from her binds. The three women unite to rescue the men from prison, and escape to the theatre together.

Commander Looi and his men arrive at the theatre to capture the escapees. The entire group decides to dress up in Peking Opera costumes and makeup, and escape through the roof of the stage as part of the performance. The bureau notices the ruse and chases after them. In the ensuing gunfight, Commander Looi is accidentally killed by his own men.

Later, Tsao Wan, Bai Niu, Sheung Hung, Pak-hoi, and Tung Man meet at a valley. They briefly share their own paths forward, and part ways with the promise to meet again after the revolution succeeds.

== Cast ==
- Brigitte Lin as Tsao Wan, General Tsao's revolutionary daughter, who studied abroad
- Cherie Chung as Sheung Hung, a wandering musician
- Sally Yeh as Bai Niu, an aspiring Peking Opera performer and daughter of an opera troupe owner
- Kenneth Tsang as General Tsao
- Wu Ma as Mr. Wong, an opera troupe owner and Bai Niu's father
- Paul Chun as Fa Gum-sao
- Mark Cheng as Ling Pak-hoi, a revolutionary who works with Tsao Wan
- Cheung Kwok Keung as Tung Man, a former soldier who eventually sides with the revolutionaries
- Ku Feng as Commander Looi, head of the auditing bureau
- Leong Po-Chih as Mr Kam, theatre owner housing Mr. Wong's opera troupe
- Huang Ha as General Tun, the former occupant of General Tsao's mansion
- Sandra Ng as Tun's wife
- Lee Hoi-sang as Soldier with moustache
- David Wu as General Tsao's interpreter

== Title ==
The Chinese title translates as Knife Horse Actresses, a term used in Peking Opera to refer to male actors playing female warriors (See Dan article for details). It is sometimes erroneously translated as Knife Horse Dawn, because both words are represented by the same Chinese character.

== Language ==
In the original audio, the characters pre-dominantly converse in Cantonese, but Bai Niu occasionally speaks Mandarin when she's frustrated. She and her father also speak Cantonese with a Taiwanese accent.

== Reception ==
=== Box office ===
The film grossed HK$17,559,357 in Hong Kong.

=== Critical response ===
On the review aggregator website Rotten Tomatoes, 78% of 9 critics' reviews are positive.

In his Wrap Up video to the Region 1 DVD of Wong Kar-wai's Chungking Express, Quentin Tarantino refers to Peking Opera Blues as "one of the greatest films ever made" and "a blast—it's a lot of fun."

=== Awards and nominations ===
Ceremony	Category	Recipient	Result
7th Hong Kong Film Awards	Best Actress	Sally Yeh	Nominated
7th Hong Kong Film Awards	Best Supporting Actor	Paul Chun	Nominated
7th Hong Kong Film Awards	Best Action Choreography	Ching Siu-tung	Nominated
7th Hong Kong Film Awards	Best Cinematography	Hang Sang Poon	Nominated
7th Hong Kong Film Awards	Best Editing	David Wu	Nominated
7th Hong Kong Film Awards	Best Art Direction	Vincent Wai, Ho Kim-sing, Leung Chi-hing	Nominated
