= Elaine Jin =

Hong Kong–Taiwanese actress

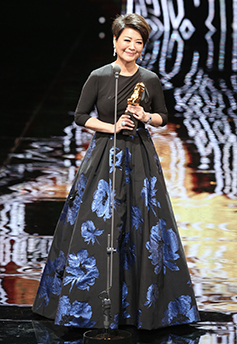
- Jin in 2016
- Born: December 15, 1954 (age 71); Taipei, Taiwan
- Years active: 1973–present
- Spouses: Lawrence Leung (m. 1975; div. 1981) Robert Wong (m. 1989; div. 2005)
- Partner: Suzie Wong
- Children: 1
- Awards: Hong Kong Film Awards – Best Supporting Actress; 1987 Love Unto Waste; 1988 People's Hero; 2015 Port of Call; 2016 Mad World Golden Horse Awards – Best Supporting Actress; 1994 A Confucian Confusion; 2016 Mad World

Chinese name
- Traditional Chinese: 金燕玲
- Simplified Chinese: 金燕玲
Transcriptions

Elaine Chin Yen-ling (Chinese: 金燕玲; pinyin: Jīn Yànlíng; born 15 December 1954), also known as Elaine Kam, is a Hong Kong–Taiwanese actress.

She began her career in Taiwan in 1973 before moving to Hong Kong in 1981.She began acting in numerours notable films in the 1970s including ones produce by Hong Kong's third-largest film enterprise Goldig Films (owned by Alex Gouw).

She has been nominated eleven times in the Hong Kong Film Awards and won four for her supporting roles in Love Unto Waste (Chinese: 地下情) (1986), People's Hero (Chinese: 人民英雄) (1987) and Port of Call (Chinese: 踏血尋梅) (2015). In 1994, Jin earned her first Golden Horse Film Award, also in the supporting category, for her performance in Edward Yang's A Confucian Confusion (Chinese: 獨立時代) (1994).

Jin won the Golden Horse Award and the Hong Kong Film Award for Best Supporting Actress for her performance in the 2016 film Mad World.

== Personal life ==
Jin has been married twice, to Liang Tingbin (梁廷斌) in 1975 (divorced in 1981) and then with Robert Wong in 1989 (divorced in 2005).

== Filmography ==
=== Film ===
Year	Title	Role	Notes
1984	I Love Lolanto		
1985	Women		Nominated - Hong Kong Film Award for Best Supporting Actress
1986	Love Unto Waste		Won - Hong Kong Film Award for Best Supporting Actress
1987	People's Hero		Won - Hong Kong Film Award for Best Supporting Actress
1988	I Need to Escape		Nominated - Hong Kong Film Award for Best Supporting Actress
1991	A Brighter Summer Day	Miss Jin	Nominated - Golden Horse Awards for Best Supporting Actress
1994	A Confucian Confusion		Won - Golden Horse Awards for Best Supporting Actress
1997	The Soong Sisters		Nominated - Hong Kong Film Award for Best Supporting Actress
1998	Tempting Heart		Nominated - Hong Kong Film Award for Best Supporting Actress
1999	Gorgeous		
1999	Metade Fumaca		Nominated - Hong Kong Film Award for Best Supporting Actress
2000	Yi Yi		
2004	Three of a Kind		
2007	Lost in Beijing	Wang Mei	
2007	Brothers	Tin's wife	
2007	The Romantic Fool		
2011	Mei Mei	Miss Chen	
2012	The Viral Factor		
2013	Finding Mr. Right	Chou	
2013	Indigo		Short film
2013	A Complicated Story		
2014	Beijing Love Story		
2015	Port of Call	May	Won - Hong Kong Film Award for Best Supporting Actress
2015	Monster Hunt		
2015	Tale of Three Cities		
2016	Buddy Cops		
2016	Mad World	Tung's Mother	Won - Hong Kong Film Award for Best Supporting Actress; Won - Golden Horse Award for Best Supporting Actress; Nominated - Asian Film Award for Best Supporting Actress; Nominated - Hong Kong Film Critics Society Award for Best Actress
2016	Summer's Desire		
2017	29+1	Elaine	
2018	About Youth		
2018	Spring Tide		
2018	House of the Rising Sons		
2019	Hypnotize the Jury		
2023	Where the Wind Blows		
2024	The Last Dance	Lin	

=== TV series ===
Year	Title	Network	Role	TVB Anniversary Awards
1983	The Man in the Middle	TVB		
1984	101 Citizen Arrest II	ATV	Ling	
2006	Central Affairs 2	ATV	Tung Zhi-shu	
2007–08	Best Selling Secrets	TVB	Ng Han	Nominated - My Favourite Female Character (Top 24)
2008–10	Off Pedder	TVB	Ka So San	
2011-12	When Heaven Burns	TVB	Yung Cheuk Wah (Brenda)	
2019	I Bet Your Pardon			
