= List of Hong Kong films of 1984 =

This article lists feature-length Hong Kong films released in 1984.

== Box office ==
The highest-grossing Hong Kong films released in 1984, by domestic box office gross revenue, are as follows:

Highest-grossing films released in 1984
Rank	Title	Domestic gross
1	Aces Go Places 3	HK$29,286,077
2	Merry Christmas	HK$25,782,012
3	Kids From Shaolin	HK$22,287,595
4	A Family Affair	HK$22,129,187
5	Wheels on Meals	HK$21,465,013
6	The Owl vs Bombo	HK$21,313,636
7	Pom Pom	HK$20,170,382
8	Teppanyaki	HK$19,516,674
9	The Return of Pom Pom	HK$18,455,255
10	Prince Charming	HK$18,107,391

== Releases ==
Title	Director	Cast	Genre	Notes
1984
Aces Go Places 3	Tsui Hark	Samuel Hui, Karl Maka		
An Amorous Woman Of Tang Dynasty	Eddie Fong			
And Now What's Your Name	Albert Lai Gin-Kwok	Kenny Bee, Michelle Yim, Chang Hing-Yue, Lai On-Yi, Tang Ching, Seung-Goon Yuk	Romance	
Banana Cop	Po-Chih Leong	George Lam, Teddy Robin, Cherie Chung	Crime / Comedy	
Behind the Yellow Line	Taylor Wong	Leslie Cheung, Maggie Cheung, Anita Mui, Anthony Chan	Romance	
Beloved Daddy	Kent Cheng Jak Si			
The Big Sting	Tony Lo	Bryan Leung, Tony Liu, Angile Leung	Action / Comedy	
The Breakthrough	Chan Kwong Chung			
Bruce Lee				
Bruce's Fist of Vengeance	Bill James			
Butcher'	Chester Wong			
Cannonball Run II	Hal Needham	Jackie Chan, Burt Reynolds, Dom DeLuise		
Cherie	Patrick Tam	Cherie Chung, Tony Leung Ka-fai, Chor Yuen	Comedy	
Death Wish	Lau Kar-Leung	Arnis Hasi, Chan Sing, Anita Mui	Action	
Double Trouble	Eric Tsang	Eric Tsang, John Shum, Sylvia Chang, Siu Ban Ban	Comedy / Drama	
Drunken Tai Chi	Yuen Woo-ping	Donnie Yen, Yuen Cheung-yan, Lydia Shum	Martial arts / Action / Comedy	
The Eight Diagram Pole Fighter	Lau Kar-leung	Alexander Fu, Gordon Liu, Lau Kar-leung, Wang Lung Wei, Kara Hui, Lily Li	Martial arts	
Everlasting Love	Michael Mak	Andy Lau, Irene Wan, Loletta Lee, Ng Man-tat	Romance	
A Family Affair	Dean Shek	Dean Shek, Samuel Hui, Jenny Tseng, Olivia Cheng, Melvin Wong	Comedy / Drama	
The Ghost Informer	Lau Hung-chuen	Tony Leung Ka-fai, Joyce Ngai, Bennett Pang		
Happy Ghost	Clifton Ko	Raymond Wong, Bonnie Law, Loletta Lee, Sandy Lamb	Comedy	
Heaven Can Help	David Chiang Da-Wei	Eric Tsang, Cherie Chung Cho-Hung, Charlie Chin Chiang-Lin, Wong Wan-Si, Mabel Kwong Mei-Bo, Anna Hoh Si-Ga, Brenda Lo Yip-Mei, Sally Kwok	Comedy	
Hong Kong 1941	Po-Chih Leung	Chow Yun-fat, Alex Man, Cecilia Yip, Ku Feng, Shih Kien, Paul Chun	War Drama film	
I Love Lolanto	Wong Jing	Natalis Chan, Pat Ha, Wong Jing, Cher Yeung	Comedy	
Kids From Shaolin	Chang Hsin-yen	Jet Li	Martial arts	
Legend of All Men Are Brothers	Tien Peng	Bryan Leung, Tien Peng	Martial arts	
Love in a Fallen City	Ann Hui	Cora Miao, Chow Yun-fat	Romance	
Merry Christmas	Clifton Ko	Karl Maka, Paula Tsui, Danny Chan, Loletta Lee, Leslie Cheung, Cyrus Wong, Yuen Woo-ping	Comedy	
Mixed Up	Henry Chow	Agnes Chan	Ghost comedy	
New Tales of the Flying Fox	Lau Sze-yuk	Felix Wong, Alex Man, Bryan Leung, Kara Hui	Wuxia	
The Occupant	Ronny Yu	Chow Yun-fat, Sally Yeh, Raymond Wong	Horror / Comedy	
Opium and the Kung-Fu Master	Tang Chia	Ti Lung	Martial arts / Action	
The Other Side of Gentleman	Ringo Lam	Alan Tam, Brigitte Lin	Romantic comedy	
The Owl vs Bombo	Sammo Hung	Sammo Hung, George Lam, Deanie Ip, Michelle Yeoh	Comedy	
Pom Pom	Joe Cheung	Richard Ng, John Shum, Jackie Chan, Sammo Hung, Yuen Biao, James Tien		
Prince Charming	Wong Jing	Kenny Bee, Natalis Chan, Cherie Chung, Maggie Cheung, Rosamund Kwan, Alex Man	Romantic comedy	
Profile in Anger	Bryan Leung	Bryan Leung, Michael Chan, Damian Lau, Pat Ha	Action / Crime	
Secret Service of the Imperial Court	Tony Lo	Bryan Leung, Nancy Hu, Tony Liu, Ku Feng	Martial arts / Action / Wuxia	
My Sentimental Little Friend	Annette Sham	Eric Tsang, Lam Leung-wai, Ray Lui, Meg Lam, Bill Tung	Drama	
Shanghai 13	Chang Cheh	Andy Lau, Jimmy Wang Yu, Ti Lung, Chiang Sheng, Chen Kuann-tai, Danny Lee, David Chiang, Bryan Leung	Martial arts / Action	
Shanghai Blues	Tsui Hark	Kenny Bee, Sylvia Chang, Sally Yeh	Romantic comedy	
Wheels on Meals	Sammo Hung	Jackie Chan, Sammo Hung, Yuen Biao, Lola Forner, Benny Urquidez	Action / Martial arts	
