= List of Hong Kong films of 1994 =

This article lists feature-length Hong Kong films released in 1994.

== Box office ==
The highest-grossing Hong Kong films released in 1994, by domestic box office gross revenue, are as follows:

Highest-grossing films released in 1994
Rank	Title	Domestic gross
1	God of Gamblers Returns	HK$52,581,796
2	Drunken Master II	HK$41,046,234
3	From Beijing with Love	HK$37,567,879
4	It's a Wonderful Life	HK$37,367,669
5	Treasure Hunt	HK$37,045,340
6	Love on Delivery	HK$36,921,789
7	Hail the Judge	HK$30,177,208
8	He's a Woman, She's a Man	HK$29,131,628
9	I Have a Date with Spring	HK$21,410,490
10	In Between	HK$20,154,293

== Releases ==
Title	Director	Cast	Genre	Notes
1994
1941 Hong Kong on Fire	Cash Chin			
Always Be the Winner	Jacky Pang			
Amazing Stories	Yi Wah			
The Amorous Lotus Pan	Li Han Hsiang			
Ancient Chinese Whorehouse	Ivan Lai	Yvonne Yung, Kent Cheng, Ching Suet-Aan, Kingdom Yuen, Elvis Tsui	Adult comedy	
Ashes of Time	Wong Kar-wai	Leslie Cheung, Tony Leung Ka-fai, Tony Leung Chiu-Wai, Jacky Cheung, Brigitte Lin, Maggie Cheung, Carina Lau		
Awakening	Cha Chuen Yee			
Back to Back, Face to Face	Wong Gin San			
Back to Roots	Raymond Leung			Entered into the 45th Berlin International Film Festival
Beginners Luck	Billy Chan			
The Beheaded 1000	Ting Shan-hsi			
Best of Best	Rico Chung Kai Cheong			
Black Sun: The Nanking Massacre				
The Bodyguard from Beijing	Corey Yuen	Jet Li, Christy Chung, Kent Cheng	Action/adventure	
C'est la vie, mon chéri	Derek Yee	Anita Yuen, Lau Ching-wan		
A Chinese Odyssey	Jeffrey Lau	Stephen Chow, Athena Chu, Ng Man-tat		Duology
Chungking Express	Wong Kar-wai	Brigitte Lin, Takeshi Kaneshiro, Tony Leung Chiu Wai, Faye Wong		
Circus Kid	Wu Ma	Donnie Yen, Yuen Biao	Martial arts, action	
Drunken Master II	Lau Kar Leung, Jackie Chan	Jackie Chan, Anita Mui, Ti Lung, Felix Wong	Action, Kung fu, comedy	
Drunken Master III	Lau Kar-leung	Andy Lau, Michelle Reis, Willie Chi, Adam Cheng, Simon Yam, Lau Kar-leung, Gordon Liu	Martial arts	
'94 du bi dao zhi qing				
Fist of Legend	Gordon Chan	Jet Li, Chin Siu Ho, Paul Chun	Kung fu, action	
From Beijing with Love	Stephen Chow	Stephen Chow, Anita Yuen	Action comedy	
Girls Unbutton	Taylor Wong	Loletta Lee, Leung See Ho, David Siu, Elvis Tsui	Romantic, comedy, erotic	
God of Gamblers Returns	Wong Jing	Chow Yun-fat	Comedy drama	
The Great Conqueror's Concubine	Wei Handao, Stephen Shin	Ray Lui, Rosamund Kwan, Zhang Fengyi, Gong Li	Historical drama	
Hail the Judge	Wong Jing	Stephen Chow, Ng Man-tat, Sharla Cheung, Elvis Tsui, Christy Chung, Ada Choi, Collin Chou, Lawrence Ng, Joey Leung, Ku Feng	Comedy	
He's a Woman, She's a Man	Peter Chan Ho Sun	Leslie Cheung, Anita Yuen	Comedy, romance, drama	
I Have a Date with Spring	Clifton Ko			
It's a Wonderful Life	Clifton Ko	Raymond Wong, Leslie Cheung		
The Kung Fu Scholar		Aaron Kwok, Dicky Cheung, Vivian Chow		Copyright notice: 1993.
Long and Winding Road	Gordon Chan	Leslie Cheung, Tony Leung Ka-fai, Rosamund Kwan, Michael Wong, Dayo Wong	Drama	
Love on Delivery	Stephen Chow	Stephen Chow	Comedy	
Mermaid Got Married	Norman Law	Ekin Cheng, Christy Chung, Takeshi Kaneshiro, Teresa Mak		
The New Legend of Shaolin	Wong Jing	Jet Li, Chingmy Yau	Kung fu, comedy	
Organized Crime & Triad Bureau	Kirk Wong	Anthony Wong Chau Sang, Danny Lee, Cecilia Yip		
Red Rose White Rose	Stanley Kwan			Entered into the 45th Berlin International Film Festival
Sparkling Fox	Wu Ziniu			Entered into the 44th Berlin International Film Festival
A Taste of Killing and Romance	Veronica Chan	Andy Lau, Anita Yuen, Mark Cheng, Christine Ng, Waise Lee	Gun fu	
The Three Swordsmen	Taylor Wong	Andy Lau, Brigitte Lin, Elvis Tsui	Wuxia, comedy	
Tian Di	David Lai	Andy Lau, Damian Lau, Cherie Chan	Crime	
Twenty Something	Teddy Chan	Moses Chan, Farini Cheung, Jordan Chan, Valerie Chow		
Why Wild Girls	Andy Chin	Ellen Chan, Loletta Lee, Ivy Leung, Ekin Cheng, Kenneth Chan	Romantic comedy, drama	
Wing Chun	Yuen Woo-ping	Donnie Yen, Michelle Yeoh	Martial arts	

== See also ==
- 1994 in Hong Kong
