= 23rd Golden Horse Awards =

Award ceremony for Chinese-language films of 1985 and 1986

- Date: November 29, 1986
- Site: Taipei Municipal Social Education Hall, Taipei, Taiwan
- Hosted by: Chang Hsiao-yen and Eric Tsang
- Organized by: Taipei Golden Horse Film Festival Executive Committee

Highlights
- Best Feature Film: Terrorizers
- Best Director: John Woo; A Better Tomorrow
- Best Actor: Ti Lung; A Better Tomorrow
- Best Actress: Sylvia Chang; Passion
- Most awards: A Better Tomorrow (4)
- Most nominations: Passion (9); A Better Tomorrow (9)

The 23rd Golden Horse Awards (Mandarin:第23屆金馬獎) took place on November 29, 1986 at the Taipei Municipal Social Education Hall in Taipei, Taiwan.

== Winners and nominees ==
Winners are listed first and highlighted in boldface.

| **Best Feature Film**: **Terrorizers**; Reunion; A Better Tomorrow; The Lunatic; The Heroic Pioneers; Passion | **Best Documentary Film**: **殺戮戰場的邊緣**; 吸煙為了什麼; 南迴鐵路工程; 山水有情; 舵 |
| **Best Director**: **John Woo — A Better Tomorrow**; Li Hsing — The Heroic Pioneers; Sylvia Chang — Passion | **Best Director for a Documentary Film**: **Lee Daw-ming — 殺戮戰場的邊緣**; Cheng Hsien-chih — 南迴鐵路工程; Yu Wei-cheng — 舵 |
| **Best Leading Actor**: **Ti Lung — A Better Tomorrow**; Chow Yun-fat — A Better Tomorrow; Kent Cheng — Why Me? | **Best Leading Actress**: **Sylvia Chang — Passion**; Loretta Yang — This Love of Mine; Cora Miao — Terrorizers |
| **Best Supporting Actor**: **Paul Chun — The Lunatic**; Waise Lee — A Better Tomorrow; Lung Ming-yan — The Law Enforcer | **Best Supporting Actress**: **Cora Miao — Passion**; Chiao Chiao — Why Me?; Li Tai-ling — The Outsiders |
**Special Award**: **Li Yeh**
