= Season Ma =

Chinese actress and assistant director

- Chinese: 馬斯晨
- Other names: Season Ma Si San, Si San Ma, See San Ma, Ma Si San, Ma Shut-San
- Occupations: Actress; assistant director
- Years active: 1982–1989
- Known for: Best New Performer in Boat People

Season Ma (Chinese: 馬斯晨) is a Chinese actress and assistant director from Hong Kong. Ma was the 1983 winner of Best New Performer.

== Career ==
In 1982, Ma started her acting career. Ma is known for her role as Cam Nuong, a 14-year-old girl, in Boat People, a 1982 drama film about Vietnamese refugees that is directed by Ann Hui. Ma won the Hong Kong Film Award for Best New Performer. Ma appeared as Bonnie Leung in The Owl vs Bombo, a 1984 action comedy film directed by Sammo Hung. In 1985, Ma debuted as an assistant director with director Stanley Kwan in Women, a drama film. This film was also a directorial debut for Stanley Kwan, who was nominated for Best Director at the 5th Hong Kong Film Awards, but did not win. In 1987, Ma was a Hong Kong Film Award for Best Actress Nominee in Silent Love, a 1986 film for her role as Heung Gite. Ma's last film as assistant director was Full Moon in New York, a 1989 drama film directed by Stanley Kwan. By 1989, Ma was credited with 4 films as assistant director and over 10 films as an actress.

== Filmography ==
=== Films ===
- 1982 Boat People (Chinese: 投奔怒海) – Cam Nuong
- 1982 Coolie Killer
- 1983 Last Affair – Mei-Lan
- 1984 Double Trouble – Ma's daughter
- 1984 The Owl and Bombo (a.k.a. The Owl vs Bombo) (Chinese: 貓頭鷹與小飛象) – Bonnie Leung
- 1985 Twinkle Twinkle Lucky Stars – Tour girl in Thailand
- 1985 Women – Assistant director
- 1986 Silent Love – Heung Gite / Heung Siu Kwai
- 1986 Armour of God – Assistant director
- 1986 The Lunatics – Teacher
- 1987 Mr. Handsome – Assistant director
- 1988 Double Fattiness – Assistant director
- 1988 In the Line of Duty III – Waitress who delivers flower
- 1988 Let's Rage the Gangland
- 1989 The First Time Is the Last Time – Ma Yuk-fung, Inmate 7144
- 1989 A Fishy Story – Communist demonstrator
- 1989 Full Moon in New York – Assistant director

== Awards ==
- 1983 Hong Kong Film Award for Best New Performer in Boat People
- 1987 Hong Kong Film Award for Best Actress Nominee in Silent Love

== See also ==
- 2nd Hong Kong Film Awards
- 6th Hong Kong Film Awards
