= 1994 in Hong Kong =

The following lists events during 1994 in British Hong Kong.

== Incumbents ==
- Monarch of the United Kingdom - Elizabeth II
- Governor - Chris Patten
- Chief Secretary - Anson Chan

== Events ==
=== April ===
- 20 April to 24 April - The International Junior Championships of Hong Kong were held in the territory, with Jeong-min lee, along with Hae-sung chung, winning the Boys Singles' and Doubles', and Ludmilla Varmuza, along with Fransesca La'o winning the Girls Singles' and Doubles' respectively.

=== September ===
- 18 September - The first tier of the 1994 Hong Kong electoral reform, pertaining to the reform of the local councils, was carried out by the last governor of Hong Kong, Chris Patten, to broaden the electorate base of the territory.

=== Undated ===
- TeleEye company is founded.

== See also ==
- List of Hong Kong films of 1994
