= United We Stand (1986 film) =

1986 Hong Kong film by Kent Cheng

- Theatrical poster
- Traditional Chinese: 飛躍羚羊
- Simplified Chinese: 飞跃羚羊
- Hanyu Pinyin: fēi yuè líng yáng
- Jyutping: fei1 joek3 ling4 joeng4
- Directed by: Kent Cheng
- Produced by: Raymond Wong Pak-Ming
- Starring: Olivia Cheng; Fennie Yuen; Gigi Lai; Bonnie Law
- Cinematography: James Chan Hau-Ming
- Edited by: Wong Ming-Lam
- Production company: Cinema City Enterprises
- Release date: 10 October 1986 (Hong Kong)
- Running time: 88 minutes
- Country: Hong Kong
- Language: Cantonese
- Box office: HK $4,073,886.00

United We Stand (Chinese: 飛躍羚羊; pinyin: fēi yuè líng yáng) is a 1986 Hong Kong teen motivational film directed by Kent Cheng. It stars Olivia Cheng, Fennie Yuen, Gigi Lai and Bonnie Law. The film ran in theaters from 10 October 1986 to 16 October 1986.

== Plot ==
Sports in Hong Kong are declining, and the pressure of an international track and field competition is almost too much for ten young athletes to bear. Famous athlete Chi Cheng hires trainer Cheung (Olivia Cheng), whose leg was hurt badly due to an unfortunate incident, to help them as they train for the competition. Polly (Gigi Lai) and Lam (Fennie Yuen) are rivals on the same team; they challenge trainer Cheung to a race, but realize trainer Cheung has outpaced them by a lot, which makes them respect trainer Cheung more. During their training, they enter a small competition and get great results; because of this, they become careless and lose to the Singapore national track and field team in the final. Trainer Cheung is furious and almost quits her job because of this. After this competition, they realize the importance of unity and hard work. Their hard work paid off in the end as they won the international track and field competition, giving sports in Hong Kong some hope.

== Cast ==
- Olivia Cheng as Trainer Cheng - Hard working, has a broken leg
- Fennie Yuen as Lam Kit (林傑) - Hates her family, hurts her own leg during the international competition
- Gigi Lai as Polly Ho (何寶兒) - Has a rich but unhappy life
- Bonnie Law as Ginger Lee (李明珠) - Emotional, energetic
- Lam Wing-Han as Bella - Leaves the training camp before the international competition
- Chiao Chiao as Polly's mother - Has high expectations for her daughter, forces her to succeed
- Kent Cheng as Canteen Boss - Grumpy, greedy
- Chi Cheng as herself
- Wellington Fung as Polly's father
- Chui Wai-Yee as Athletic trainee
- Lee Git-Liu as Athletic trainee
- Miu Hung as Athletic trainee
- Chung Pui-Pui as Athletic trainee
- Leung Sam-Yee as Meryle Ma ''Monkey''
- Wong Chi-Ling as Cybel Mak ''Sleepy''
- Fofo Seung-Ngok Ma as Fatty
- Ken Boyle as Athletic Official
- Ka-Kui Wong as Athletic Official
- Ann Bridgewater as Ann Bridgewater (cameo)
- Charine Chan as Chan Siu Ling (cameo)
- Billy Lau as Billy (cameo)
- Stephen Chang as Tsang Kwong Chin (cameo)

== Critical response ==
On the Chinese movie review website, Douban, it received an average rating of 7.1 out of 10 based on 378 user reviews.
