= 5th Hong Kong Film Awards =

1986 Hong Kong Film Awards

- Date: 6 April 1986
- Site: The Regent Hong Kong
- Hosted by: Winnie Yu

The 5th Hong Kong Film Awards ceremony, honored the best films of 1985 and took place on 6 April 1986, at the Regent International Hotel, Hong Kong. The ceremony was hosted by Winnie Yu, during the ceremony awards are presented in 15 categories. The ceremony was sponsored by City Entertainment Magazine.

== Awards ==
Winners are listed first, highlighted in boldface, and indicated with a double dagger (‡).

**Best Film**: **Police Story**‡; Women; Illegal Immigrant; Mr. Vampire	**Best Director**: **Mabel Cheung — The Illegal Immigrant**‡; Stanley Kwan — Women; Sammo Hung — Heart of Dragon; Ricky Lau — Mr. Vampire; Jackie Chan — Police Story
**Best Actor**: **Kent Cheng — Why Me?**‡; Chow Yun-fat — Women; Michael Hui — Mr. Boo Meets Pom Pom; Jackie Chan — Heart of Dragon; Jackie Chan — Police Story	**Best Actress**: **Pauline Wong — Love With a Perfect Stranger**‡; Cora Miao — Women; Deannie Yip — The Unwritten Law; Pat Ha — My Name Ain't Suzie; Brigitte Lin — Police Story
**Best Supporting Actor**: **Mang Hoi — Yes Madam**‡; Clarence Fok — Let's Make Laugh II; Lam Ching Ying — Mr. Vampire; Billy Lau — Mr. Vampire	**Best Supporting Actress**: **Deanie Ip — My Name Ain't Suzie**‡; Elaine Kam — Women; Polly Chan — Hong Kong Graffiti; Pauline Wong — Night Caller
**Best New Performer**: **Polly Chan — Hong Kong Graffiti**‡; Michelle Yeoh — Yes, Madam; Mark Cheng — Cupid One; Billy Lau — Mr. Vampire	**Best Screenplay**: **Jamie Luk• Tang Wing Hung** — **Love with a Perfect Stranger**‡; Yau-tai On-ping & Lai Kit— Women; Ng See-yuen — The Unwritten Law; Alex Law — The Illegal Immigrant; Wong Ying • Barry Wong • Szeto Chuk Hon — Mr Vampire
**Best Cinematography**: **Poon Hang Sang — Life and Death**‡; Bill Wong — Women; Abdul Rumjohnn — Infatuation; Peter Ngor — Mr. Vampire; Cheung Yiu Tsou — Police Story	**Best Film Editing**: **Chow Cheung Kan — Hong Kong Graffiti**‡; Chiang Kwok Keun • Ng Fung Lam — Infatuation; Cheung Yiu Chung — Mr. Vampire; Cheung Yiu Chung — Police Story
**Best Art Direction**: **Luk Suk Yuen — Night Caller**‡; Tony Au — Women; William Chang Suk Ping — Infatuation; Lee King Man — My Name Ain't Suzi; Lam Sai Kan — Mr. Vampire	**Best Action Direction**: **Jackie Chan Stunt Team — Police Story**‡; Corey Yuen • Mang Hoi — Yes, Madam; Yuen Biao • Lam Ching Ying — Mr. Vampire; Sammo Hung Stunt Team — My Lucky Stars; Sammo Hung Stunt Team — Heart of Dragon
**Best Original Film Score**: **Melody Bank — Mr. Vampire**‡; Law Wing Fai — Women; Lowell Lo — Infatuation; Waiorrend Lam — Heart of Dragon	**Best Original Film Song**: **Composer: Lam Man-Yi • Lyrics: Poon Yuen Leung** **• Singer: Su Rui — Heart of Dragon**‡; Composer: Sam Hui • Lyrics: Richard Lam • Singer: Sam Hui — Working Class; Composer: Lowell Lo • Lyrics: Susan Tang • Singer: Lowell Lo — Infatuation; Composer: George Lam • Lyrics: Cheng Kwok Kong • Singer: George Lam — The Owl and Dumbo; Composer: Anders Nelsson • Lyrics: Cheng Kwok Kong • Singer: 傑兒合唱團 — Mr. Vampire
**Jury Award**: **Kent Cheng — Why Me?**‡; Terry Tong — Hong Kong Graffit; Jamie Luk — Love With a Perfect Stranger

The People's Choice Award was a short-lived award presented at the 5th Hong Kong Film Awards. The first and only recipient was Kent Cheng for his role in the 1985 drama Why Me.

People's Choice Award
- Country: Hong Kong
- Presented by: Hong Kong Film Awards
- First award: 1985

Film	Nominee	Role	Result
Why Me	Kent Cheng	Actor	Won
Love with the Perfect Stranger	Jamie Luk	Actor	Nominated
Hong Kong Graffiti	Terry Tong Gei-ming	Director	Nominated
