= Olivia Cheng =

Olivia Cheng may refer to

- Olivia Cheng (Canadian actress)
- Olivia Cheng (Hong Kong actress)
- Olivia Cheng (pool player)
