= Yu Rongguang =

Chinese actor and martial artist (born 1958)

- Born: 30 August 1958 (age 68); Beijing, China
- Education: Beijing Fenglei Peking Opera Troupe
- Occupations: Actor, martial artist
- Years active: 1982–present
- Children: Yu Zhilong
- Parent: Yu Mingkui (于鸣魁)

Chinese name
- Traditional Chinese: 于榮光
- Simplified Chinese: 于荣光
Transcriptions
Standard Mandarin
- Hanyu Pinyin: Yú Róngguāng
Yue: Cantonese
- Jyutping: Jyu1 Wing4-gwong1

Yu Rongguang (Chinese: 于荣光; born 30 August 1958), also known as Ringo Yu, is a Chinese actor and martial artist. He is best known for the title role in Iron Monkey along with Donnie Yen as well as being featured in films such as The East Is Red, My Father Is a Hero, and Musa.

Yu is also known for appearing in roles for films with Jackie Chan such as New Police Story and The Myth and in North America Shanghai Noon and the 2010 remake of The Karate Kid.

== Biography ==
Yu Rongguang was born on August 30, 1958, to Yu Mingkui (于鸣魁), a Peking opera actor. He has two younger brothers.

== Filmography ==
=== Film ===
Year	Title	Role	Notes
1985	Holy Robe of the Shaolin Temple		
1987	Mirage		
1989	Fight and Love with a Terracotta Warrior	Bai Yunfei	
1991	Red Fists		
1992	Deadend of Besiegers		
1993	Iron Monkey	Yang Tianchun / Iron Monkey	
1993	Once a Cop	David Chang	
1993	The East Is Red	Gu Changfeng	
1993	Taxi Hunter		
1994	From Beijing with Love	Agent killed by Golden Gun	cameo
1994	A Gleam of Hope		
1994	The Green Hornet		
1994	Rock 'n Roll Cop		
1994	The Third Full Moon		
1995	Fox Hunter		
1995	Heart of Killer		
1995	Lover of the Last Empress		
1995	Man Wanted	Lu Chan-feng	
1995	My Father Is a Hero	Po Kwang	
1995	Red Zone		
1995	Wind Beneath My Wings		
1996	18 Shaolin Golden Boys		
1996	Big Bullet	The Professor	
1996	Combo Cops		
1996	The Killer has No Return		
1996	Midnight Train of the Orient		
1997	Enjoy Yourself Tonight		
1998	Ballistic Kiss		
1998	Leopard Hunting		
1998	The Storm Riders	Striding Sky	
1998	Shanghai Affairs		
1998	Wipe Out		
1999	Big Spender		
1999	Prince Charming		
2000	Never Compromise		
2000	Shanghai Noon	Imperial guard	
2000	The Warning Time		
2001	Musa	Rambulwha	
2002	Tsui Hark's Vampire Hunters		
2003	Internet Disaster		
2003	The Boxing King		
2004	New Police Story	Commander Chiu	
2005	Divergence	Inspector Mok	
2005	The Myth	Rebel general Zhao Kuang	
2007	Brothers	Cheung Man-wah	
2008	Three Kingdoms: Resurrection of the Dragon	Han De	
2008	Champions		
2008	The Underdog Knight		
2009	Mulan	Hua Hu	
2010	Little Big Soldier	Deputy general Yu	
2010	Just Another Pandora's Box	Gan Xing	
2010	East Wind Rain		
2010	The Karate Kid	Master Li	
2011	Cold Steel		
2012	Refresh 3+7		
2013	School Bus		
2013	Police Story 2013		
2015	Highway of Love		
2015	Who Am I 2015		
2019	Spy Wolf Chameleon		
2019	Magic Circle		
2023	Ride On	He Xin	

=== Television ===
Year	Title	Role	Notes
1993	Romance of the Three Kingdoms	Han Fu	
1996	The Unbeatables II	Zhuang Weicheng	
2000	Lanse Yaoji 蓝色妖姬	Dongfang Hongfei	
2000	Zhenyan 真言	Chang Rong	
2000	Cema Xiao Xifeng 策马啸西风	Ximen Chuixue	
2001	Master Swordsman Lu Xiaofeng 2	Gong Jiu	
2001	The Grand Mansion Gate	Bai Hua	
2002	Jingwu Yingxiong Chen Zhen	Xi Feiyang	
2002	Zhenqing Meigui 真情玫瑰	Shen Jie	
2003	Heroic Legend 萍踪侠影	Ming Wang	
2004	Bingshan Shang De Laike 冰山上的来客	Ma Zhanjiang	
2004	Youlei Jinqing Liu 有泪尽情流	Xu Linfeng	
2005	Yijiang Chunshui 一江春水		Director
2005	Tianhe Ju 天和局		Director
2005	Jin Mao Xiang	Bai Biao	
2006	Romance of Red Dust	Qiu Ran Ke	
2007	Langdu Hua 狼毒花	Chang Fa	
2008	Seven Days that Shocked the World 震撼世界的七日	An Weimin	
2010	Three Kingdoms	Guan Yu	
2010	The Legend of Incorruptible Stone 廉石传奇	Lu Ji	
2011	1911 Revolution	Cai E	
2012	The Advisors Panel 劝和小组	Cheng Jiu 成就	
2012	The Patriot Yue Fei	Zhou Tong	
2013	Ip Man	Yu Fengjiu	
2014	Red Sorghum	Zhu Haosan	
2016	God of War, Zhao Yun	Zhao An	
2018	Battle Through the Heavens	Xiao Zhan	
2019	Joy of Life	Xiao En	
