= Miss Chinese International Pageant 1993 =

- Date: January 10, 1993
- Presenters: Eric Tsang, Philip Chan
- Venue: TV City, Hong Kong
- Broadcaster: TVB
- Entrants: 27
- Placements: 12
- Winner: Christy Chung 鍾麗緹; Montréal, Canada
- Congeniality: Stephanie Chang; Seattle, USA

The 5th Miss Chinese International Pageant, Miss Chinese International Pageant 1993 was held on January 10, 1993 in Hong Kong. The pageant was organized and broadcast by TVB in Hong Kong. Miss Chinese International 1992 Rosemary Chan crowned Christy Chung of Montréal, Quebec, Canada as the winner.

== Pageant information ==
The theme to this year's pageant continues to be "The Traditions of the Dragon, The Embodiment of Beauty" 「龍的傳統 俏的化身」. The Masters of Ceremonies were Eric Tsang and Philip Chan.

== Results ==
Placement	Contestant	City Represented	Country Represented
Miss Chinese International 1993	Christy Chung 鍾麗緹	Montréal	Canada
1st Runner-Up	Emily Lo 盧淑儀	Hong Kong	Hong Kong
2nd Runner-Up	Elaine Barbara Der 謝綺玲	Vancouver	Canada
Top 12 Finalists	Stephanie Chang 張念先; May-Yee Wong 黃美儀 (Li-Tsui Chan) 陳莉翠 (Wai-Ling Mak) 麥慧玲; Rojsirin Sote-Siri 姚玉娟; Le Ngo 吳秀莉 (Kuen-Ling Shum) 岑狷菱; Katie Luong 梁皇莊; Angie Cheong 張慧儀	Seattle; San Francisco; Johannesburg; Calgary; Bangkok; Auckland; Edmonton; Los Angeles; Ipoh	USA; USA; South Africa; Canada; Thailand; New Zealand; Canada; USA; Malaysia

=== Special awards ===
- Miss Friendship: Stephanie Chang 張念先 (Seattle)
- Miss Handsome Looking: Christy Chung 鍾麗緹 (Montréal)

== Contestant list ==
No.	Contestant Name	Represented City	Represented Country
1	Elaine Barbara DER 謝綺玲	Vancouver	Canada
2	Stephanie LIN 林贊蕊	Kuching	Malaysia
3	(Wing-Sze AU) 區穎思	Melbourne	Australia
4	Stephanie CHANG 張念先	Seattle	USA
5	(Chiu-Ling CHENG) 鄭筱玲	Christchurch	New Zealand
6	Jennifer Anne LEE 李秀玲	Victoria	Canada
7	(Kit-Man SUN) 辛潔雯	New York City	USA
8	May-Yee WONG 黃美儀	San Francisco	USA
9	Emily LO 盧淑儀	Hong Kong	Hong Kong
10	Christy CHUNG 鍾麗緹	Montréal	Canada
11	Sheela Mae SANTARIN 辛達蓮	Manila	Philippines
12	(Li-Tsui CHAN) 陳莉翠	Johannesburg	South Africa
13	(Wai-Ling MAK) 麥慧玲	Calgary	Canada
14	Rojsirin SOTE-SIRI 姚玉娟	Bangkok	Thailand
15	Le NGO 吳秀莉	Auckland	New Zealand
16	(Man LEE) 李雯	Brunei	Brunei
17	(Kuen-Ling SHUM) 岑狷菱	Edmonton	Canada
18	Lok-I HO 何玉儀	Macau	Macau
19	(Ching-Yuk LEE) 李菁玉	Brisbane	Australia
20	Jennifer WONG 王文靜	Toronto	Canada
21	(Ngo-Tak WONG) 黃奧德	Chicago	USA
22	Jie PENG 彭潔	Sydney	Australia
23	Sandra VONGUE 黃水蓮	Tahiti	French Polynesia
24	Katie LUONG 梁皇莊	Los Angeles	USA
25	Claudia HUANG 黃秀慧	Taipei	Chinese Taipei
26	Irene ANG 洪愛玲	Singapore	Singapore
27	Angie CHEONG 張慧儀	Ipoh	Malaysia

== Crossovers ==
Contestants who previously competed or will be competing at other international beauty pageants:

Miss World

- 1992: Macau : Ho Lok-I

Miss Universe

- 1993: Hong Kong: Emily Lo

Miss International

- 1993: Philippines: Sheela Mae Santarin
