= Hi, Fidelity =

2011 Hong Kong film by Calvin Poon

- Film poster
- Traditional Chinese: 出軌的女人
- Simplified Chinese: 出轨的女人
- Directed by: Calvin Poon
- Written by: Calvin Poon; Yeung Yee Shan
- Story by: Megan Zheng
- Produced by: Derek Kwok
- Starring: Pat Ha; Michelle Ye; Carrie Ng; William Chan
- Cinematography: Ardy Lam; Derek Wan
- Edited by: Chung Wai-Chiu
- Distributed by: Mei Ah Entertainment
- Release date: 24 March 2011
- Running time: 91 minutes
- Country: Hong Kong
- Language: Cantonese

Hi, Fidelity is a 2011 Hong Kong dramatic film written and directed by Calvin Poon. The film stars Pat Ha, Michelle Ye, Carrie Ng and William Chan.

== Cast ==
- Pat Ha
- Michelle Ye
- Carrie Ng
- William Chan
- George Lam
- Chapman To
- Lawrence Cheng
- Candice Yu

== Awards and nominations ==
=== 31st Hong Kong Film Awards ===
- Won – Best Original Song
- Nominated – Best New Director (Calvin Poon)

== Release ==
The film was released in Hong Kong on 24 March 2011.
