= Li Yuan (writer) =

Taiwanese novelist and screenwriter (born 1955)

- 李遠
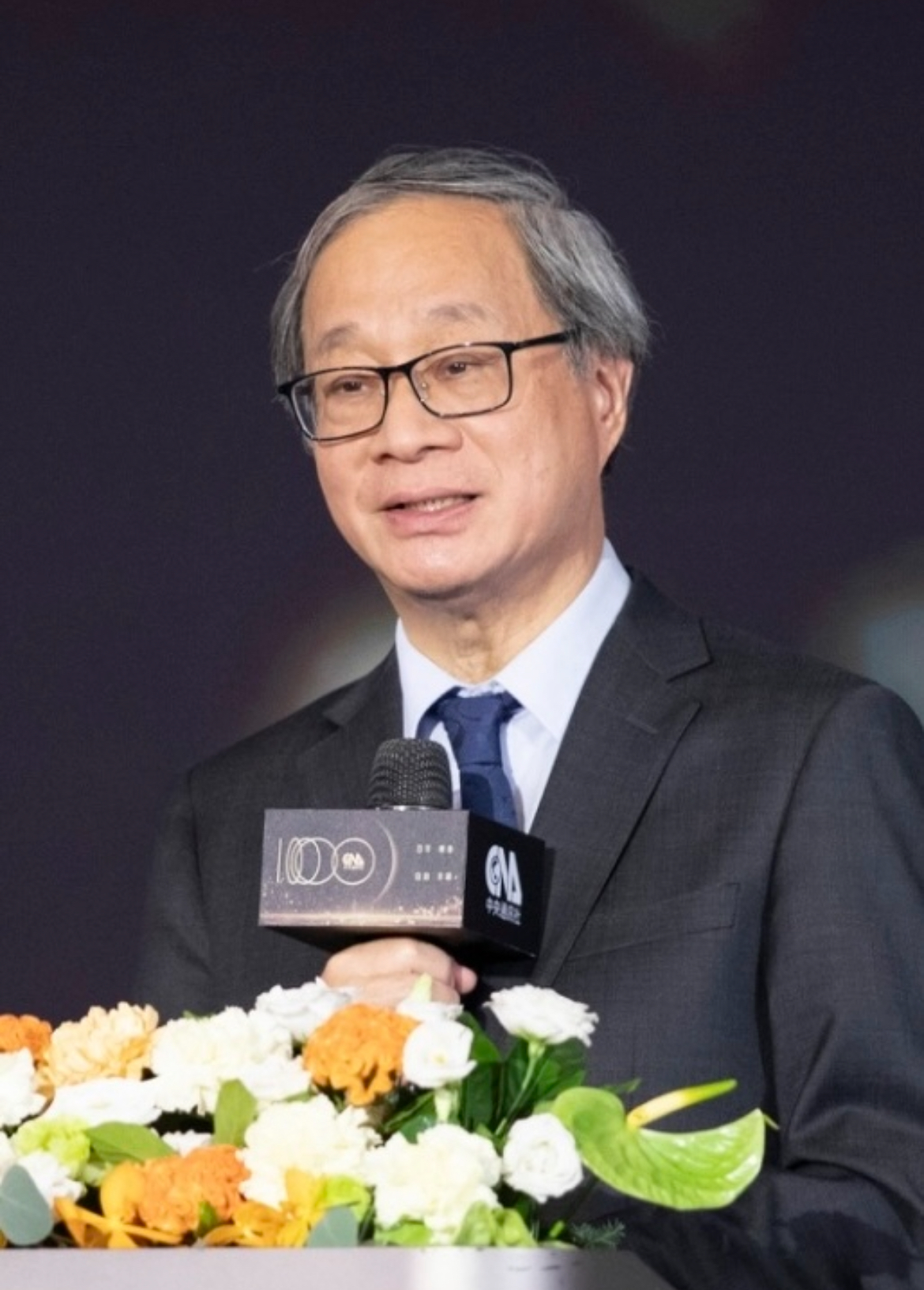
- Li in 2024

6th Minister of Culture
- Incumbent
- Assumed office 20 May 2024
- Prime Minister: Cho Jung-tai
- Preceded by: Shih Che

Personal details
- Born: 31 October 1951 (age 74) Monga, Taipei, Taiwan
- Party: Independent
- Education: National Taiwan Normal University (BS); State University of New York at Buffalo (MS)
- Awards: Golden Horse Award for Best Original Screenplay (1986); Golden Horse Award for Best Adapted Screenplay (1990)
- Writing career
- Pen name: 小野
- Years active: 1974–present

Li Yuan (Chinese: 李遠; Pe̍h-ōe-jī: Lí Oán; born 31 October 1951), also known by his pen name Hsiao Yeh (Chinese: 小野; Pe̍h-ōe-jī: Sió-iá), is a Taiwanese novelist, screenwriter and politician who has been Minister of Culture since 2024.

== Early life and education ==
Li Yuan was born in Monga, Taipei, on 31 October 1951. He is of Hakka Chinese descent. His family's ancestral home was in Wuping County; his parents moved to Taiwan in 1949. His father was a statistician and his mother taught writing at National Taiwan Normal University (NTNU), later becoming a journalist.

Li's father gave his eldest son the pen name Hsiao Yeh, and both parents encouraged him to write. Li read classics such as War and Peace and The Old Man and the Sea at the age of 11, at the behest of his father and was forced to write reports on them afterward, though Li preferred to draw cartoons and perform plays instead.

Li graduated from National Taiwan Normal University with a bachelor's degree in biology. He then earned a Master of Science (M.S.) in microbiology from the State University of New York at Buffalo in the United States. Upon returning to Taiwan, Li became a teaching assistant at National Yang Ming University.

== Career ==
Hsiao Yeh published his first book in 1974, and was hired by the Central Motion Picture Corporation in 1981. In 1986, Hsiao Yeh won his first Golden Horse Award for Best Original Screenplay. The next year, he and Edward Yang shared the 1987 Asia-Pacific Film Festival Award for best screenplay after co-writing Terrorizers. Hsiao Yeh stated in 2001 that, while he was at CMPC, many of his superiors came from military backgrounds and films were often made according to Kuomintang-led governmental directives. There, Hsiao Yeh also met Wu Nien-jen, with whom he founded May Productions in 1989. Shortly after starting May Productions, Hsiao Yeh won the 1990 Golden Horse Award for Best Adapted Screenplay. Later that decade, he became a television writer and presenter. Hsiao Yeh worked for Taiwan Television from 2001 to 2004 and served as general manager of Chinese Television System from 2006 to 2008. He contributed to the book Touring Taiwan, released in 2008. Hsiao Yeh was the artistic director of the musical "Hey! Atiku", which was based on one of his stories and debuted in 2010, the first such Hakka production geared toward children.

== In politics ==
=== Activism ===
Shortly after Tsai Ing-wen founded Thinking Taiwan in August 2012, Li was one of the first invited to join. In March 2013, Li participated in an anti-nuclear demonstration planned by the Green Citizens' Action Alliance and held around the Presidential Office. Days later, he and another former CMPC colleague, Ko I-chen, among others, started the Five Six Movement, in opposition to nuclear technologies. A wide-ranging group that included Li Yuan, Lee Yuan-tseh, Wei Te-sheng, Giddens Ko, and Kevin Tsai founded the Anti-Nuclear Fathers Front with the same goal, on Father's Day. In November, Li was invited to the Zero-Nuke Festival hosted by the Green Citizens’ Action Alliance. He was largely supportive of the Sunflower Student Movement in 2014. Li joined the 2018 Taipei mayoral campaign of political independent Ko Wen-je as campaign director.

=== Formal political career ===
On 12 April 2024, Li Yuan was appointed the Minister of Culture in the incoming cabinet led by Cho Jung-tai. Li himself has no party affiliation.

== Personal life ==
Li Yuan's son Lee Chung is a writer and film director.
