= Man Wanted (1995 film) =

1995 Hong Kong film by Benny Chan

- Film poster
- Directed by: Benny Chan; Steve Cheng
- Screenplay by: Chan Tak
- Produced by: Benny Chan; Rainy Chan; Wong Siu-ming
- Starring: Simon Yam; Yu Rongguang; Christy Chung; Eileen Tung
- Cinematography: Patrick Jim; Fletcher Poon
- Edited by: Ng Kam-wa
- Music by: Jonathon Wong
- Production company: Sam Po Film
- Distributed by: Golden Harvest
- Release date: 16 March 1995
- Running time: 132 minutes
- Country: Hong Kong
- Language
- Traditional Chinese: 旺角的天空
- Simplified Chinese: 旺角的天空
- Hanyu Pinyin: Wàng Jiǎo De Tiān Kōng
- Jyutping: Wong6 Gok3 Dik1 Tin1 Hung1
- Box office: HK $7,598,170

Man Wanted is a 1995 Hong Kong action thriller film directed by Benny Chan and Steve Cheng and starring Simon Yam, Yu Rongguang, Christy Chung and Eileen Tung.

== Plot ==
Lok Man-wah (Simon Yam), an undercover cop, sets up a sting for a notorious drug lord and Man-wah's friend Luk Chan-fung (Yu Rongguang). Luk manages to escape but falls victim to a car bomb planted in his getaway vehicle. Following the funeral, Man-wah begins to put the moves on Luk's ex-girlfriend Yung (Christy Chung), even though he is already involved with June (Eileen Tung), another woman. Later it is revealed that Luk is not dead and insists on Man-wah help him in a kidnapping scheme, thus beginning an elaborate revenge scheme that costs June her life and Lok his career.

== Cast ==
- Simon Yam as Lok Man-wah
- Yu Rongguang as Luk Chan-fung
- Christy Chung as Yung-yung
- Eileen Tung as June Lok
- Law Kar-ying as Blad Ying
- Cherie Chan as Mindy
- Kenneth Chan as Officer Tai
- Parkman Wong as Inspector Wong
- Bill Lung as Brother Wu
- Kwan Chung
- John Wakefield as Police Review Board officer
- Wong Man-shing
- Ng Kam-hung
- Emana Leung
- Chung Yuk-ting
- Chang Kwok-hei
- Lee Ka-hung
- So Wai-nam
- Simon Cheung as Policeman
- Chang Kin-yung as Policeman
- Wong Wai-shun as Robber
- Lam Kwok-kit
