= On the Run (1988 film) =

1988 Hong Kong film by Alfred Cheung

- Film poster
- Traditional Chinese: 亡命鴛鴦
- Simplified Chinese: 亡命鸳鸯
- Hanyu Pinyin: Wáng Mìng Yuān Yāng
- Jyutping: Mong4 Ming6 Jin1 Jeong1
- Directed by: Alfred Cheung
- Written by: Alfred Cheung; Keith Wong
- Produced by: Sammo Hung
- Starring: Yuen Biao; Pat Ha; Charlie Chin
- Cinematography: Peter Ngor
- Edited by: Yu Shun
- Music by: Violet Lam
- Production companies: Bo Ho Films; Mobile Film Production; Paragon Films
- Distributed by: Golden Harvest
- Release date: 15 October 1988
- Running time: 88 minutes
- Country: Hong Kong
- Language: Cantonese
- Box office: HK$6,912,828

On the Run (Chinese: 亡命鴛鴦) is a 1988 Hong Kong action thriller film directed by Alfred Cheung, written by Cheung and Keith Wong, and produced by Sammo Hung. It stars Yuen Biao, Pat Ha and Charlie Chin. The film was released theatrically in Hong Kong on 15 October 1988.

== Plot ==
Chui Pai (Pat Ha) is a dangerous killer who shot a woman during the night and lives with her daughter. She has been hunted for many years and cannot stop hiding. Heung Ming (Yuen Biao) is a police officer has been doing his job poorly. His wife was killed in a restaurant and the police accuse him of his wife's murder. Things become even more complicated for Heung as he discovers that she and he are now targeted by detectives led by Superintendent Lui (Charlie Chin), seeking to cover evidence of their own drug crimes. Framed for murder, Heung rapidly runs out of options as the killers target his elderly mother and young daughter. Wounded, Heung is forced to rely on the assassin Pai, who slowly warms up to him while caring for him and his young daughter. They have to stick together as long as they can until they die or are taken under custody.

== Cast ==
- Yuen Biao as Heung Ming
- Pat Ha as Chui Pai
- Charlie Chin as Superintendent Lui
- Lo Lieh as Hsi
- Philip Ko as No-hands policeman
- Yuen Wah as Cowardly policeman
- Idy Chan as Inspector Lo Huan
- Chan Cheuk-yas Lin (Pai's daughter)
- Lee Heung-kam as Heung's mother
- Lawerance Lau as Heung's brother
- Orlando To as Hao
- Lam Lap-san as Hui
- Peter Ngor as Unce Lu
- Bowie Lam as Johnny
- May Cheung as Fong
- Peter Pau as Doctor
- Chow Kam-kong as Cop
- Kwan Yung as Cop
- Pang Yun-cheung as Cop
- Ng Kwok-kin as Ling (Drug Squad member)
- Yau Kam-hung

== See also ==
- List of Hong Kong films of 1988
