= Un Baiser Volé (film) =

2000 Hong Kong film by Chu Yui-bun

- Traditional Chinese: 偷吻
- Simplified Chinese: 偷吻
- Hanyu Pinyin: Tōuwěn
- Directed by: Chu Yui-bun
- Written by: Patrick Kong; Manfred Wong
- Produced by: Manfred Wong; Chiu Fu-Sheng
- Starring: Christy Chung; Stephen Fung; Natalie Ng; Crystal Cheung Yee Tung
- Cinematography: Yiu-Fai Lai
- Edited by: Pan Xiong
- Music by: He Zhitang
- Production companies: Oriental Film Printing co., LTD
- Release date: 1 June 2000
- Running time: 90 minutes
- Country: Hong Kong
- Language: Cantonese

Un Baiser Volé is a 2000 Hong Kong romantic comedy film written by Patrick Kong and Manfred Wong, and produced by Chiu Fu-Sheng and Manfred Wong. The film stars Christy Chung, Stephen Fung, Natalie Ng, and Crystal Cheung Yee Tung.

== Plot ==
Stephen Lee was accepted to the university after the college entrance examination. He has a girlfriend Wu Shude, who is his first love, they fell in love for seven years, and they don't have premarital sex.

Stephen Lee dates Amy in the university, and they have sex frequently, he became a promiscuity man. When Amy finds him cheating they break up. He also falls in love with his French teacher, Sophia, but Sophia has a foreign boyfriend.

After a period of time, Stephen Lee breaks up with Wu Shude, then she was married to a doctor. A year later, Sophia left Hong Kong for France.

== Cast ==
- Christy Chung as Sophia, a college teacher.
- Stephen Fung as Stephen Lee, a college student.
- Natalie Ng as Amy, Stephen Lee's girlfriend.
- Crystal Cheung Yee Tung as Wu Shude, Stephen Lee's first Love.
- Sheung Mo Lam as Sophia's foreign boyfriend.
