= A Family Affair (1984 film) =

1984 Hong Kong film by Dean Shek

- Film poster
- Traditional Chinese: 全家福
- Simplified Chinese: 全家福
- Hanyu Pinyin: Quán Jiā Fú
- Jyutping: Cyun4 Gaa1 Feok1
- Directed by: Dean Shek
- Written by: Lee Chun
- Produced by: Raymond Wong
- Starring: Sam Hui; Olivia Cheng; Dean Shek; Jenny Tseng; Melvin Wong
- Cinematography: Joe Chan
- Edited by: Tony Chow
- Music by: Lam Miu-tak
- Production company: Cinema City & Films Co.
- Distributed by: Golden Princess Film Production
- Release date: 15 August 1984
- Running time: 97 minutes
- Country: Hong Kong
- Language: Cantonese
- Box office: HK$22,129,187

A Family Affair is a 1984 Hong Kong comedy-drama film directed by and starring Dean Shek, and co-starring Sam Hui, Olivia Cheng, Jenny Tseng, and Melvin Wong.

== Plot ==
Wing-cheung (Sam Hui) and his wife Nancy (Olivia Cheng) have separated due to personality clashes, leaving their pair of children, 10-year-old Maisy and 7-year-old Tommy, under the care of Nancy's father, Alex (Dean Shek). Not long after, Wing-cheung and Nancy have each met new lovers. Not wanting his grandchildren to fall into the hands of stepparents, Alex devise a plan for Wing-cheung and Nancy to reconcile. However, his plan backfires and Wing-cheung and Nancy eventually file for divorce. Feeling disappointed and upset, Tommy and Maisy run away from home.

== Cast ==
- Sam Hui as Chan Wing-cheung
- Olivia Cheng as Nancy
- Dean Shek as Alex
- Melvin Wong as George Ma
- Jenny Tseng as Linda (special appearance)
- Siu Ban-ban as Tommy
- Helen Chan as Maisy
- Yu Mo-lin as Cleaning lady
- Yat-poon Chai as Policeman at station

== Theme song ==
- Love Is Invincible (無敵是愛)
  - Composer/Lyricist: Samuel Hui
  - Singer: Samuel Hui, Jenny Tseng

=== Box office ===
The film grossed HK$22,129,187 at the Hong Kong box office during its theatrical run from 15 August to 5 September 1984.

== Accolades ==
Accolades
Ceremony	Category	Recipient	Outcome
21st Golden Horse Awards	Best Original Film Song	Song: Love Is Invincible (無敵是愛) Composer/Lyricist: Samuel Hui; Singer: Samuel Hui, Jenny Tseng	Nominated
