= Women (1985 film) =

1985 Hong Kong film by Stanley Kwan

- Film poster
- Traditional Chinese: 女人心
- Simplified Chinese: 女人心
- Hanyu Pinyin: Nǚ Rén Xīn
- Jyutping: Neoi2 Jan2 Sam1
- Directed by: Stanley Kwan
- Written by: Yau-tai On-ping; Kit Lai
- Produced by: Vicky Leung Lee
- Starring: Cora Miao; Chow Yun-fat; Cherie Chung; Elaine Jin
- Cinematography: Bill Wong
- Edited by: Chow Siu-lam; Fong Bo-wa
- Music by: Law Wing-fai
- Production companies: Pearl City Films; Shaw Brothers Studio
- Distributed by: Shaw Brothers Studio
- Release date: 12 June 1985
- Running time: 91 minutes
- Country: Hong Kong
- Language: Cantonese
- Box office: HK$9,487,785

Women is a 1985 Hong Kong drama film directed by Stanley Kwan in his directorial debut. Like Kwan's following films, Women focuses on female characters and their efforts to overcome cultural restrictions. The cast includes Cora Miao, Chow Yun-fat, Cherie Chung and Elaine Jin. It was nominated for nine Hong Kong Film Awards including Best Picture.

== Plot synopsis ==
The film follows Po-yee (Cora Miao) as she starts her new life as a single mother after divorcing her husband, Derek (Chow Yun-fat), having found out he was having an affair with another woman, Sha-nau (Cherie Chung).

== Cast ==
- Cora Miao as Liang Bo-Er
- Chow Yun-Fat as Derek Sun (as Chow Yun Fat)
- Cherie Chung as Sha Niu
- Ngan Lee as Bo-Er's mom

== Awards and nominations ==
The film was nominated for nine Hong Kong Film Awards but failed to win any. In addition Cora Miao received a Best Actress nomination at the Golden Horse Film Festival.

5th Hong Kong Film Awards:

- Nominations:
  - Best Picture
  - Best Director (Stanley Kwan)
  - Best Actor (Chow Yun-fat)
  - Best Actress (Cora Miao)
  - Best Supporting Actress (Elaine Jin)
  - Best Screenplay (Tai An-Ping Chiu, Kit Lai)
  - Best Cinematography (Bill Wong)
  - Best Original Film Score (Wing-fai Law)
  - Best Art Direction (Tony Au)

Golden Horse Film Festival:

- Nominations:
  - Best Actress (Cora Miao)
