= Terrorizers =

- Video cover
- Chinese: 恐怖分子
- Hanyu Pinyin: Kǒngbù Fènzǐ
- Directed by: Edward Yang
- Written by: Hsiao Yeh; Edward Yang
- Produced by: Hsu Kuo-liang
- Starring: Cora Miao; Lee Li-chun; Wang An; Ma Shao-chun; Jin Shih-jye; Gu Bao-ming
- Cinematography: Chang Chan
- Edited by: Liao Ching-sung
- Music by: Weng Hsiao-liang
- Production company: Central Motion Pictures
- Release date: December 19, 1986 (Taiwan)
- Running time: 110 minutes
- Country: Taiwan
- Language: Mandarin

Terrorizers is a 1986 drama film by Taiwanese filmmaker Edward Yang.

== Plot ==
Despite injuring her leg, aimless young delinquent Shu An flees from the police while her criminal boyfriend Shun is arrested during a raid on his gang's apartment hideout in Taipei. Unemployed photographer Qiang snatches photos of the event. Writer Zhou Yufen, depressed from a miscarriage three years prior and the monotony of her life with her husband, laboratory scientist Li Lizhong, struggles with her novel about a couple with marital issues. When the section chief of Li's hospital dies, Li, eager to secure the post, falsely implicates his longtime friend and potential candidate for misconduct, leading the latter to quit in indignation.

Shen, Zhou's old boss at a newspaper, rehires her, and the two begin an affair. Qiang's girlfriend, enraged at the pictures of Shu he has hung up in the apartment, attempts suicide. Stuck in her apartment while she recovers, Shu places prank calls on both the gang's apartment—which Qiang has rented to use as a darkroom—and other people in her building, including Li. When Zhou picks up the phone, Shu pretends to be Li's mistress and asks to meet at the apartment. Suspicious, Zhou goes to the apartment and encounters Qiang.

Zhou goes missing for several days before returning, and decides to leave Li due to his inability to understand her pain. A healed Shu goes to a club where the gang hangs out, where she seduces and robs a man. She returns to the gang's apartment and discovers Qiang has put up a collage of photos on his wall that form the picture of her. He admits he has become obsessed with her and, believing he will be drafted soon, kisses her and asks her to be with him when he returns. She steals and pawns his camera, buying him a cheaper one before leaving with a released Shun. Returning to his wealthy family, Qiang receives a draft notice and reconciles with his girlfriend.

Zhou's novel wins an award and Qiang recognizes her picture in the paper. His girlfriend mentions that the novel is about a man whose wife discovers he is cheating on her, so he kills her and himself. A wary Qiang contacts Li and sends him photos of Shu and Shun. Li pleads with Zhou to take him back and tries to force her when she rebuffs him. He is passed over for the promotion, and realizes that the hospital director has been avoiding him.

Li drinks with his police chief friend Gu, claiming he was given the promotion, and steals his gun in the morning. He kills the director before going to Shen's apartment, shooting him, but sparing Zhou. Wandering the streets, he encounter Shu, who has been extorting men with Shun's help. He allows her to take him to a hotel room as the police converge on his location, and as Shu, wary of his strange behavior, takes out a knife, blood splatters across the wall. Gu wakes to find that Li actually shot himself, while Zhou wakes next to Shen and vomits, leaving it ambiguous whether Shen's shooting was her dream, Gu's, Li's, or if the vomiting was due to morning sickness.

== Cast ==
- Cora Miao as Zhou Yufen, a depressed novelist
- Lee Li-chun as Li Lizhong, a hospital professional and Zhou Yufen's husband
- Chin Shih-chieh as Shen, Zhou Yufen's ex who owns a company
- Wang An as Shu An
- Liu Min as Shu An's mother
- Yu An-shun as Shun, Shu's criminal boyfriend
- Ku Pao-ming as Gu, police chief and Li Lizhong's friend
- Ma Shao-chun as Qiang, a photographer
- Huang Chia-ching as Qiang's girlfriend

== Reception and legacy ==
Terrorizers is a part of the New Taiwan Cinema. "Famously characterized by Marxist scholar Fredric Jameson as the postmodern film, the film was likened by Yang himself to a puzzle where the pleasure lies in rearranging a multitude of relationships between characters, spaces, and genres."

=== Awards and nominations ===
- 1986 Golden Horse Film Festival
  - Won: Best Feature Film
  - Nominated: Best Leading Actress – Cora Miao
  - Nominated: Best Original Screenplay – Hsiao Yeh and Edward Yang
- 1987 Pesaro Film Festival
  - Won: Best Director
- 1987 Locarno International Film Festival
  - Won: Silver Leopard
- 1987 British Film Institute Awards
  - Won: Sutherland Trophy
- 1987 Asia-Pacific Film Festival
  - Won: Best Screenplay – Edward Yang, Hsiao Yeh
