= The Bodyguard from Beijing =

1994 Hong Kong film by Corey Yuen

- The Bodyguard from Beijing film poster

Chinese name
- Traditional Chinese: 中南海保鑣
- Simplified Chinese: 中南海保镖
Transcriptions
Standard Mandarin
- Hanyu Pinyin: Zhōngnánhǎi Bǎobiāo
Yue: Cantonese
- Jyutping: Zung1-naam4-hoi2 Bou2-biu1
- Directed by: Corey Yuen
- Written by: Chan Kin-chung; Gordon Chan
- Produced by: Jet Li
- Starring: Jet Li; Christy Chung; Kent Cheng; Sing Ngai
- Cinematography: Tom Lau
- Edited by: Angie Lam
- Music by: William Hu
- Production companies: Eastern Production; Golden Harvest Company
- Distributed by: Golden Harvest
- Release date: 28 July 1994
- Running time: 93 minutes
- Country: Hong Kong
- Languages: Cantonese; Mandarin
- Box office: HK$11.2 million

The Bodyguard from Beijing (simplified Chinese: 中南海保镖; traditional Chinese: 中南海保鑣; released in the United States as The Defender and United Kingdom as Jet Li's The Defender) is a 1994 Hong Kong action film directed by Corey Yuen. It stars Jet Li, who also produced, as a bodyguard who is employed to protect a businessman's girlfriend who witnessed a murder. It also co-stars Christy Chung, Kent Cheng and Sing Ngai. The film was released theatrically in Hong Kong on 28 July 1994.

== Plot ==
The film's protagonist is Allan, a professional bodyguard based in Beijing whose tactical and martial arts skills and quick thinking have protected several statesmen from assassination. He is hired by James Song Sai-cheung, a wealthy Hong Kong businessman, to protect his beautiful girlfriend Michelle Leung, who is the only surviving witness to a murder, after all the others had been eliminated in various ways. Allan arrives at the girl's home in Hong Kong to meet with two somewhat incompetent plainclothes police officers - Fat Po and Ken - in charge of her safety. Soon after meeting Miss Leung, he proves the entire contingent of current bodyguards incapable in his fight with them during what he thought was an assassination attempt, and they are all fired. He also disarms both policemen.

Allan inspects the entire home and vehicles for bugs, bombs and layout, and installs security cameras covering various areas, including Michelle's bedroom, which he can monitor through a personal device. She is unhappy about this and, after attempting unsuccessfully to order him out, manages to knock down the camera with a frying pan. He also gives her a panic button.

During a road trip, hitmen attempt to assassinate her but fail due to Allan's strategy of having a decoy VIP car driven by Fat Po and the girl riding with him in the trailing van.

Michelle tries getting away from her bodyguard by complaining to her boyfriend and by sneaking away during the night with the younger officer, Ken, in a car. Allan reassures James and nonchalantly makes himself visible in the car's headlights as the escapees start it; Michelle has a fit as she goes back into the house.

Michelle eventually goes to the shopping mall accompanied only by the two cops. The mall, however, is staked out by operatives. One is about to murder her by firing his suppressed weapon through a stall partition, but is shot first by Allan, who had followed them and was in the stall beyond hers. This initiates a gunfight through the mall; Allan takes out multiple hitmen while shielding the girl. Eventually he realizes all the hitmen have two pens in their front pocket as identification, and poses as one to take more out. During their escape Fat Po is wounded.

One of the assassins who posed as a police officer and killed by Allan during the shoot-out is the younger brother of Killer Wong, a former Chinese soldier who fought together with his brother. Wong swears vengeance on Allan.

In the meantime, Michelle shows her attraction to Allan, which had been growing since the beginning, after using her transmitter to make him storm the bedroom and "protect" her. He leaves to continue his duties, leaving her panting behind the door.

Things come to a climax when the transmitter sounds again, this time in earnest. Wong and a group of assassins storm the penthouse and start a gunfight. Both policemen and Allan rush to protect her; Ken, the younger cop, was killed by Wong himself. Allan uses his firearm and martial skills and, after darkening the room, cunningly takes out all the assailants until only Wong is left. He and Wong have a long fight, complicated by leaking gas which threatens to black both out. Eventually Wong recovers a pistol and takes the girl hostage. James arrives unawares, and attempts to dissuade Wong from shooting by offering to pay Wong, but Wong refuses. When an opportunity arrises as the assassin backs away, Allan shields Michelle with his body and takes two shots but manages to pull out a bayonet, with which he had been previously wounded, from his chest and throw it towards Wong's neck, killing him.

Before the film ends, James drives Michelle to the border between Hong Kong and mainland China as she tries to see Allan a final time before he heads back to China, but guards at the checkpoint deny them entry into the mainland. However, Allan leaves Michelle with the box that held the watch she had given to him as a present and he had tried to refuse. However, when she opens it, the box contains his own watch, while Fat Po receives Allan's payment money to fund his son's school tuition. Michelle cries out Allan's name just as his car drives away from the border back into the mainland.

== Cast ==
- Jet Li as Allan Hui Ching-yeung (John Chang in the American release)
- Christy Chung as Michelle Yeung
- Kent Cheng as Charlie Leung Kam-po ("Fat Po") (Sergeant Lau in the American release)
- Sing Ngai as Killer Wong (Wang Wenjun in the American release)
- Joey Leung as Keung (Ken in the American release)
- Ng Wai-kwok as James Song Sai-cheung
- William Chu as Billy
- Wong Kam-kong as Chiu Kwok-man (uncredited)
- Wong Wah-woh as Coroner (uncredited)
- Corey Yuen as Shopper in Mall (uncredited)
- Sam Wong
- Gary Mak as Assassin in Shopping Center
- Kevan Cummins as bodyguard to US President

== Production ==
Shooting took place in Hong Kong.

== Release ==
The film was banned in China after production was finished. However, Jet Li spoke against the censorship of his films.

=== Home media ===
DVD was released in Region 1 in the United States on August 15, 2000, and Region 2 in the United Kingdom on 29 April 2002, it was distributed by Dimension Home Video.

=== Television ===
In the United Kingdom, the film (released as Jet Li's The Defender) was watched by 1.3 million viewers on television in 2004, making it the year's fourth most-watched foreign-language film on television (below Crouching Tiger, Hidden Dragon, First Strike, and Fong Sai-yuk II). It was later watched by 600,000 UK viewers in 2006, making it the year's most-watched foreign-language film on BBC1. Combined, the film drew a 1.9 million UK viewership in 2004 and 2006.

== Reception ==
At the Hong Kong box office, the film grossed HK$11,193,177.

Rotten Tomatoes, a review aggregator, reports that 71% of seven surveyed critics gave the film a positive review; the average rating is 5.5/10. Joey O'Byan of The Austin Chronicle rated it 2.5/5 stars and called it "lively, unpretentious fun". Aaron Beierle of DVD Talk rated it 2/5 stars and wrote, "An ok movie; sort of entertaining at times, but not great."

== See also ==
- Jet Li filmography
- List of Hong Kong films
