= New Economic Zones program =

Post war human relocation program in Vietnam

The New Economic Zones program (Vietnamese: Xây dựng các vùng kinh tế mới) was implemented by the Democratic Republic of Vietnam and Socialist Republic of Vietnam before and after the Fall of Saigon. Between 1975 and 1980, more than 1 million northerners migrated to the south and central regions formerly under the Republic of Vietnam. This program, in turn, displaced around 750,000 to over 1 million Southerners from their homes and forcibly relocated them to uninhabited mountainous forested areas. Properties of evicted southern Vietnamese were confiscated, collectivized, and then redistributed by the communist authorities, and the recipients of these confiscated properties were often former Viet Cong, and members or affiliates of the North Vietnamese communist party or People's Army of Vietnam.

Conditions in the "New Economic Zones" were poor. After a 1976 visit to a new economic zone for former Saigon, French journalist Jean Lacouture wrote that it was "a prefabricated hell and a place one comes to only if the alternative to it would be death." R.J. Rummel, an analyst of political killings, estimated that between 20,000 and 155,000 Vietnamese died performing hard labor in New Economic Zones

Since 1975, Southern Vietnamese use the term "Bắc 54" ("Tonkin 54") to refer to Northern Vietnamese who migrated to the South in 1954 (as part of Operation Passage to Freedom, who were mainly political and religious refugees fleeing impending communist rule), and "Bắc 75" ("Tonkin 75") to refer to Northerners who migrated to the South in 1975 onward, many under this economic program.

This program, combined with various other factors like government persecutions, grave human rights violations and lack of civilian freedoms, oppression, lack of economic freedom, poverty and starvation resulting from governmental mismanagement of the centrally planned economy caused a mass exodus of 1-3 million Vietnamese fleeing communist rule, the majority of whom were from South Vietnam.

== See also ==
- Re-education camp (Vietnam)
- Indochina refugee crisis
- Down to the Countryside Movement
