= Christy Chung =

Canadian actress

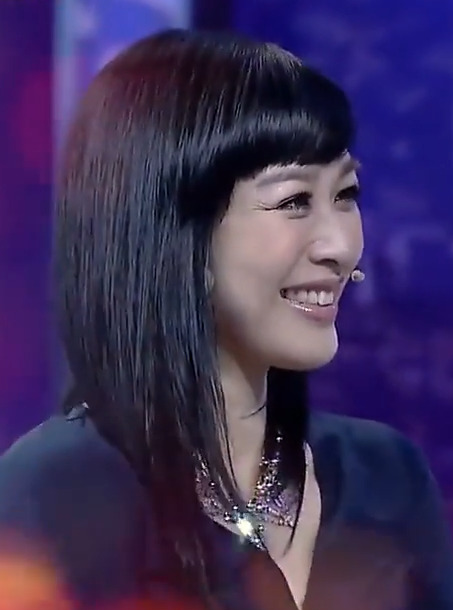
- Chung in 2016
- Born: 19 September 1970 (age 56); Montreal, Quebec, Canada
- Education: Université du Québec à Montréal
- Occupation: Actress
- Years active: 1984–present
- Spouses: Glen Ross (m. 1998; div. 2002) Jon Yen (m. 2003; div. 2011) Shawn Zhang (m. 2016)

Chinese name
- Traditional Chinese: 鍾麗緹
- Simplified Chinese: 钟丽缇
Transcriptions
Standard Mandarin
- Hanyu Pinyin: Zhōng Lìtí
Yue: Cantonese
- Jyutping: Zung1 Lai6 Tai4

Christy Chung (born 19 September 1970) is a Canadian actress based in China. She is best known for starring in films Mermaid Got Married, The Bodyguard from Beijing, Love on Delivery and Jan Dara.

== Early life ==
Chung was born in Montreal, Quebec, to a Chinese-Vietnamese father and a native Vietnamese mother. She grew up in Brossard, Quebec, a suburb of Montreal, with French and Vietnamese as mother-tongues. She later learned English, Mandarin and Cantonese.

== Career ==
While studying for a career in the tourism industry at the Université du Québec à Montréal (UQAM), she entered and won the Miss Chinese Montreal contest in 1992. She then went to Hong Kong, in her first trip away from home, to participate in the Miss Chinese International Pageant 1993, in which she won despite not knowing a single Chinese word. This opened doors for her to launch her acting career there, despite not speaking a word of Cantonese at the time, and despite her extremely limited acting experience (an uncredited ten-second non-speaking role as a gum-chewing prostitute in Denys Arcand's Love and Human Remains). She had to choose between acting in Hong Kong and becoming the weather-forecast presenter at Société Radio-Canada, the French-language government television network in Canada.

A role in The Bride with White Hair 2 brought her instant recognition, and she became a well-known star in Chinese-language popular culture, acting in a large number of films including some films starring Stephen Chow, as well as The Bodyguard from Beijing starring Jet Li.

Giving birth to her daughter in 1998 temporarily had a negative effect on her career because of a stereotypical impression that a mother could not function as a sex symbol, but her career recovered in 2000. She subsequently had roles in Samsara and Jackie Chan's movie The Medallion. She added Thai to her language repertoire when she starred in Nonzee Nimibutr's 2001 film Jan Dara. Singapore FHM magazine voted her the "Sexiest Woman in Asia" in 2000.

In 2010, she starred in Bruce Lee, My Brother, playing the role of Bruce Lee's mother and Aarif Lee portrayed Lee.

She is a brand ambassador and spokeswoman to slimming service Marie France Bodyline, prominently appearing on billboards and print ads.

Despite her success, she remains mostly unknown in Quebec, where she was born and grew up, because she has done most of her film work in Cantonese.

== Personal life ==
Chung married Glen Ross in 1998, and gave birth to their daughter Yasmine in Montreal in the middle of the 1998 Ice Storm. Chung and Ross divorced in 2002, and Chung has sole custody of Yasmine.

In 2003, Chung married music producer Jon Yen. They have two daughters, Jaden Chloe, born in August 2008, and Cayla Janie, born in February 2010. Chung and Yen divorced in 2011.

In November 2016, Chung married Chinese actor Shawn Zhang Lunshuo, also known as Golden Zhang who is 12 years her junior.

Chung currently resides in Beijing. She is currently a restaurant owner.

== Filmography ==
- Sisters Who Make Waves (2020)
- Fall in Love at First Kiss (2019)
- Into the Rainbow (2017)
- The Right Mistake (2015)
- Bad Sister (2014)
- The Incredible Truth (2013)
- Better and Better (2013)
- Good-for-Nothing Heros (2012)
- Dear Enemy (2011)
- The Bright Eleven (2010)
- Bruce Lee, My Brother (2010)
- Hong Kong Express (2005) (TV)
- Asian Charlie's Angels (2004) (TV)
- Astonishing (2004) – Mandy
- Fantasia (2004) – Jane Lam, aka Little Britney
- Demi-Gods and Semi-Devils (2003 TV series) – Kang Min
- The Medallion (2003) – Charlotte Watson
- Never Again (Lee Soo Young Music Video) (2001) – the Mother in the Video
- Samsara (2001) – Pema
- Jan Dara (2001) – Khun Boonlueang
- Un Baiser Volé - Sophia
- Gen-Y Cops (2000) – Inspector Chung
- Conman in Tokyo (2000) – Banana
- Tau mung (2000) – Sophia
- Troublesome Night (1997) – Mrs. To
- All's Well, Ends Well 1997 (1997) – Little Shien
- 97 Aces Go Places (1997) – Li Lai-Shen
- The God of Cookery (1996) – High School Fantasy Girl
- Tai Chi Boxer (1996) – Rose
- Twinkle Twinkle Lucky Star (Yun cai zhi li xing) (1996) – Christie Lee/Angel of Nine Heavens
- Red Wolf (1995) – Lai
- Mack the Knife (1995) – Jamie
- Passion 1995 (1995) – Tina
- Faithfully Yours (1995) – Miss Tang
- Man Wanted (1995) – Yung
- Love on Delivery (1994) – Lily
- Hail the Judge (1994) – Stone Mansion
- Modern Romance (1994) – Ady
- Mermaid Got Married (1994) – Wong Siu May, the mermaid
- I Wanna Be Your Man (1994) – Ron
- The Bodyguard from Beijing (1994) – Michelle Yeung
- Whatever You Want (1994) – Pearl Ko
- Perfect Exchange (1993) – Lily
- The Bride with White Hair 2 (1993) – Moon

Achievements
Preceded by (Canada) Rosemary Chan	Miss Chinese International; 1993	Succeeded by (Thailand) Saesim Pornapa Sui
