= The Owl vs Bombo =

1984 Hong Kong film by Sammo Hung

- Hong Kong DVD cover
- Directed by: Sammo Hung
- Written by: Cheung Lai-ling
- Produced by: Sammo Hung
- Starring: Sammo Hung; George Lam; Deanie Ip; Michelle Yeoh; James Tien; Philip Chan
- Cinematography: Arthur Wong
- Edited by: Peter Cheung
- Music by: Chris Babida; Tang Siu-lam
- Distributed by: D&B Films
- Release date: 12 December 1984
- Running time: 96 minutes
- Country: Hong Kong
- Language: Cantonese
- Box office: HK$21.3 million

The Owl vs Bombo (Chinese: 貓頭鷹與小飛象) (also known as The Owl vs Bumbo and The Owl and Dumbo) is a 1984 Hong Kong action comedy film directed, produced by and starring Sammo Hung with George Lam, Deanie Ip and Michelle Yeoh (in her first film role; credited as "Michelle Khan"), that is about a former police inspector that blackmails two thieves into becoming teachers at a reform center.

== Plot ==
First-Day Chan, codename ‘Bombo’ (Sammo Hung) is a dockman and yoga instructor who moonlits as a thief. He had robbed a bank and made himself a small fortune, but vowed it to be his last heist. Wong Yan-fu (George Lam), codename ‘Owl’, managed to steal a large stash of money from a gangster and fraudster, Au Gung (James Tien). Their deeds are uncovered by Inspector Fung (Stanley Fung), who tries to arrest all three men. However, his endeavours are deliberately sabotaged by his superior, Lui (Chang Ching-Po), who is secretly in liaison with Au. Exasperated, Fung resigns.

Three years later, Fung blackmails Owl and Bombo, threatening to expose and imprison them unless they listen to his instructions. The two reluctantly comply and end up signing up as teachers at a reform center with Joyce Leung (Deanie Ip), the superintendent. Joyce believes both men genuinely want to help for the good of society and begins to take an interest in Bombo.

At the center, Owl and Bombo meet Yeung (Michelle Yeoh), the teacher of a class of social outcasts. Despite her efforts to get the students employed and integrated into society, she is verbally abused and ridiculed by them. Owl tries his hand at getting through to the class, but fails miserably. Fung, meanwhile, keeps an eye on both men by pretending to be a deaf and mute janitor. Bombo later begins courting Joyce while Owl comforts Yeung after a particularly bad lesson with one of her students, Bonnie Leung (Season Ma). They are then handed their last task by Fung: to attend a land auction and raise the bid to the highest possible. This is due to Au having plans to purchase the land to manufacture counterfeit watches, although neither Owl nor Bombo are aware of this.

At the auction, they bid against Au for a plot in the New Territories. Bombo, assuming Au will outbid them, raises the bidding amount to an exorbitant 300 million dollars. To both his and Owl’s shock, however, Au does not make a higher offer and both men win the lot. Owl is later captured by Au and his henchmen and is forced at knifepoint to lure Bombo to their location in a hotel room. Au offers to buy the land from them for 150 million dollars, not knowing neither men ever had the money to begin with. Owl and Bombo, realizing this will be imminently discovered, try fighting their way out but are beaten and forced to sign the land over. The next day, Owl meets with Yeung but upon seeing her students continue to bully her, snaps and angrily reprimands them. He takes charge and challenges any student who agrees to role play and succeed in a job interview money. He has a breakthrough with one of the students, Chan Chi-ming (Ronald Wong), who reveals his guilt and desperation for a job to prevent his mother from prostituting herself to support him and his father. Moved, Owl gives him the money, and the rest of the students begin volunteering and opening up to Owl and Yeung. They later take the class around the city where they attempt to find jobs, as well as other school excursions. During this time, Owl and Yeung begin developing feelings for each other. Bombo meanwhile, sees Fung talking with another man, later revealed to be his superintendent (Philip Chan), and grows suspicious. Due to Owl and Bombo having mistakenly won at the land auction, Fung now plans on using the two to lure Au out into the open and arrest them. Lui, meanwhile, has revealed Owl’s true identity to Au as well as the fact he had been the one who stole his money three years prior. He then reveals Owl’s occupation as a teacher at the reform center. Au orders his men to intimidate the students there into luring Owl to meet them at the docks. Owl and his student Chan are both kidnapped and beaten. Au begins making plans to drown them at sea. Bombo, who has discovered Fung’s true identity, confronts him at the reform center. He then learns from the students they had met with Au and had been forced by him to lure Owl into danger, and rushes to the docks to save him.

Yeung goes to the police station where she begs Lui to help rescue Owl. Lui makes a call to Au, urging him to release the student but Au refuses. Lui tries to go to the docks but en route is arrested by Fung and his superintendent, who have recorded his entire conversation with Au. Yeung accompanies Fung to save Owl and Chan. Back at the dock, Bombo confronts Au and fights off his henchmen but is outnumbered. However, he is saved when unexpected reinforcements arrive: the students at the reform center, who attack using an arsenal of sports equipment. Fung, his superintendent, and Yeung arrive in time to arrest the gangsters whereupon they also discover several boxes of undelivered counterfeit watches. For his efforts, Fung is reinstated as inspector while Owl and Bombo are allowed to go.

== Cast ==
- Sammo Hung as Chan "Bombo Chan" First-Day
- George Lam as Wong "Owl Wong" Yan-Fu
- Deannie Ip as Joyce Leung
- Michelle Khan as Yeung
- Season Ma as Bonnie Leung
- Stanley Fung as Inspector Fung
- Philip Chan as Superintendent
- Wu Ma as Waiter
- Ronald Wong as Chan Chi-Ming
- Cheung King-po as Wah / Inspector Lui
- James Tien as Au Gung
- Fung King-man as Au Gung's Lieutenant
- Dick Wei as Au Gung's Man
- Tai San as Au Gung's Man
- Tai Po as Gang Member
- Huang Ha as Gang Member
- San Kuai as Gang Member
- Billy Chan as Gang Member
- Sham Chin-po as Gang Member
- Wellson Chin as Gang Member
- Yuen Miu as Gang Member
- Lee Chi-kit as Gang Member
- Hon Yee-sang as One of Owl's Accomplices
- Yat-poon Chai as One of Owl's Accomplices
- Teddy Yip as Waiter
- Charlie Cho as Bank Manager
- Chin Kar-lok as Thug In Alley
- Johnny Cheung as Thug In Alley
- Lau Chau-sang as Thug
- Yam Ho as Brother Lun
- Tsang Choh-lam as Waiter
- Ng Min-kan as Cop
- Lee Fat-yuen as "Big Head"
- Chow Kam-kong as Security Guard At Bank
- Ka Lee as Bank Employee
- Cheung Chi-ban as Lawyer Chow
- Hui Ying-sau as Uncle Choy
- Sam Wong as Student
- Timothy Zao as Student
- Chu Wing-tong as Student
- Joey Leung as Student

== Awards ==
The film's theme song 'Who Understands Me', performed by George Lam, was nominated for Best Original Film Song at the 5th Hong Kong Film Awards.

== Release ==
=== Home media ===
The Owl vs Bombo was released on DVD by Tai Seng Video on October 20, 2001.
