= TeleEye =

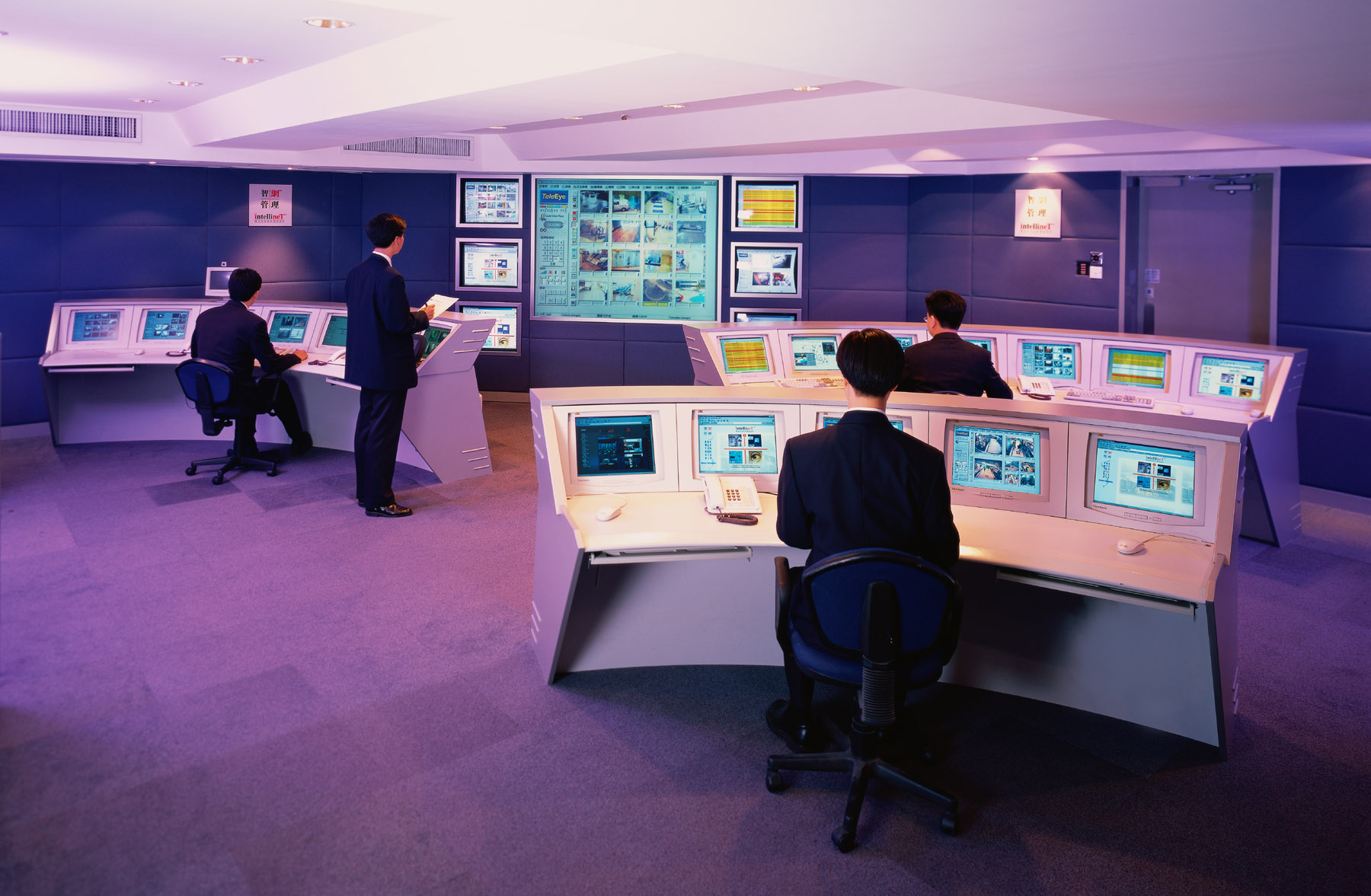
A company using the TeleEye system

TeleEye Group (SEHK: 8051), is a Hong Kong–based audio-visual, information technology company, founded in 1994. The primary products of the group are network CCTV and DVR applications. The TeleEye Group is the first company to become a publicly traded company arising from the support of a Hong Kong public university and the Hong Kong government through the Business Incubation Programme. (Mak 43) Today, the TeleEye Group of products is available internationally in 25 countries.

== History ==
The TeleEye group was founded by engineering researchers from the City University of Hong Kong.

== Products ==
The most notable products of the Group include the TeleEye and the CAMERIO.
