= Pat Ha =

Hong Kong actress

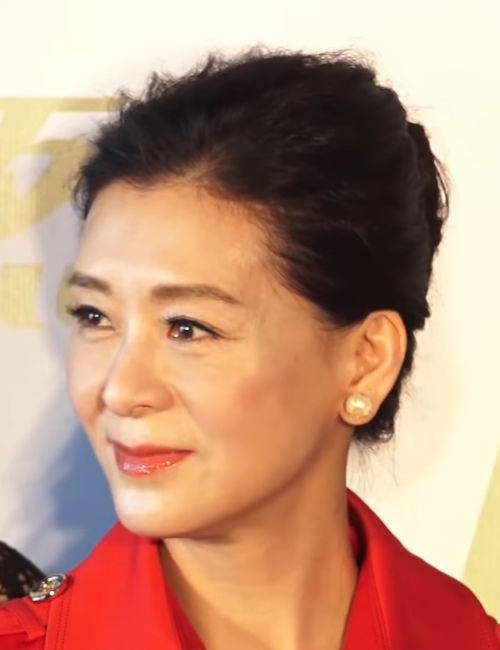
- Ha in January 2017
- Born: Tang Lai Kwan (鄧麗群); 21 November 1959 (age 66); Hong Kong

Pat Ha Man Jing (Chinese: 夏文汐; pinyin: xià wén xī) (born 21 November 1959) is a Hong Kong actress. She has been hailed among as the first generation of heroic women in Hong Kong due to her early roles.

== Early life ==
Ha was born in Hong Kong on November 21, 1959, as Ha Man Jing.

== Career ==
Ha started acting in the 1982 film Nomad. She was nominated for Best Actress at the 5th Hong Kong Film Awards (1986) for her role in My Name Ain't Suzie.

Ha retired in 1989.

== Personal life ==
Ha is married and has three daughters.

== Filmography ==
Year	Title	Role	Awards
1982	Nomad	Kathy	Nominated - Hong Kong Film Award for Best New Performer; Nominated - Hong Kong Film Award for Best Actress
1983	Winners and Sinners	Tar's daughter	
1984	An Amorous Woman of Tang Dynasty	Yu Xuanji	
1985	My Name Ain't Suzie	Mary/ Shui Mei	Nominated - Hong Kong Film Award for Best Actress
1988	On the Run	Chui Pai	
1996	The New Longmen Roadhouse	Jin Xiangyu 金湘玉	
1998	The Return of the Condor Heroes	Huang Rong	
2002	Princess D		
2011	Hi, Fidelity		
2011	The Woman Knight of Mirror Lake		
2011	Let's Go!		
2016	Lost Minds		
2017	Margaret & David - Ex	Fong Suk-wah 方淑華	
2018	Daddy Cool	Yung Tsz-kiu 翁芷蕎	
2018	The Secret Board		
