= Why Me? (1985 film) =

1985 Hong Kong film by Kent Cheng

- Film poster
- Traditional Chinese: 何必有我
- Simplified Chinese: 何必有我
- Hanyu Pinyin: Hé Bì Yǒu Wǒ
- Jyutping: Ho4 Bit1 Jau2 Ngo2
- Directed by: Kent Cheng
- Screenplay by: Raymond Wong; Kent Cheng; Philip Cheng
- Produced by: Raymond Wong
- Starring: Chow Yun-fat; Kent Cheng; Olivia Cheng
- Edited by: Wong Ming-lam
- Music by: Chris Babida
- Distributed by: Cinema City
- Release date: 29 October 1985
- Running time: 92 minutes
- Country: Hong Kong
- Language: Cantonese
- Box office: HK$7,060,507

Why Me? (何必有我) is a 1985 Hong Kong drama film written, directed by and starring Kent Cheng. The film co-stars Chow Yun-fat and Olivia Cheng. For his performance in the film, Kent Cheng won his first Hong Kong Film Award for Best Actor at the 5th Hong Kong Film Awards.

== Cast ==
- Kent Cheng as Fat Cat
- Olivia Cheng as Koko Cheng
- Chow Yun-fat as Mr. Chow
- Lisa Chiao Chiao as Fat Cat's mother
- Paul Chu as Koko's father
- Tien Lie as Koko's mother
- Ouyang Sha-fei as Koko's grandmother
- Karen Chan as Ms. Chan
- Eric Tsang as Eric
- Shing Fui-On as Jackson Ken
- Jamie Luk as Ken's rascal
- Fofo Ma as Ken's rascal
- Kara Hui as Gambler's wife
- Lau Kar-wing as Lion dancer
- Annette Sam as IQ assessor
- Ng Siu-gong as Policeman at Village Wai
- Peter Lai as Police officer
- Wong Yue as Police officer
- Yam Choi-bo as Family Service Dept's staff
- Lung Tin-sang as Family Service Dept's staff

== Awards and nominations ==
Awards and nominations
Ceremony	Category	Recipient	Result
5th Hong Kong Film Awards	Best Actor	Kent Cheng	Won
5th Hong Kong Film Awards	Jury Award	Kent Cheng	Won
23rd Golden Horse Awards	Best Supporting Actress	Lisa Chiao Chiao	Nominated
