= George Lam =

Hong Kong singer-songwriter, music producer and actor

- 林子祥
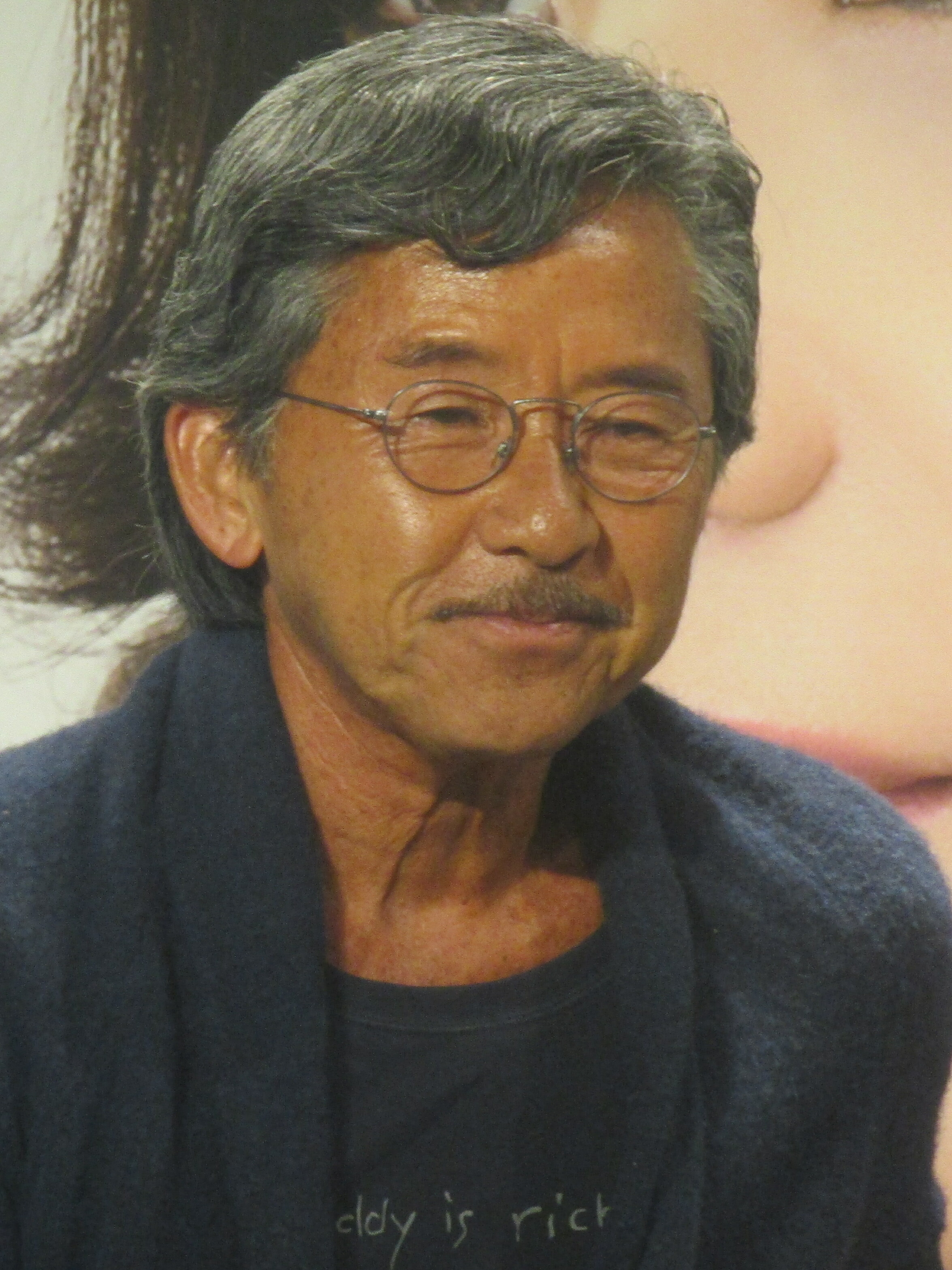
- Lam in 2016
- Born: Lam Tsz-cheung; 12 October 1947 (age 79); British Hong Kong
- Occupations: Singer; songwriter; composer; music producer; actor
- Years active: 1976–present
- Spouses: Ng Ching Yuen (m. 1980; div. 1994) Sally Yeh (m. 1996)
- Children: 2
- Awards: See below
- Musical career
- Also known as: Ah Lam (Chinese); Lam (English)
- Genres: Cantopop, English pop
- Instruments: Vocals, piano, guitar
- Labels: Warner Music Group, EMI

Chinese name
- Chinese: 林子祥
Transcriptions
Standard Mandarin
- Hanyu Pinyin: Lín Zǐxiáng
Yue: Cantonese
- Jyutping: Lam^{4} Zi^{2}coeng^{4}

George Lam Tsz-cheung (Chinese: 林子祥; Jyutping: Lam^{4} Zi^{2}coeng^{4}, born 12 October 1947), also credited mononymously as Lam, is a Hong Kong Cantopop singer, songwriter, composer, record producer, and actor, with a career spanning more than four decades.

In addition to his singing career, Lam has also acted in various TV dramas and films, making his film debut in Luckies Trio in 1978. He was nominated for a Hong Kong Film Award for Best Actor for his performance in Ann Hui's Boat People (1982).

== Early life ==
Lam was born in British Hong Kong to a family of physicians, with both his father, a Yuen Long obstetrician, and paternal grandfather (the former hospital chief executive of Alice Ho Miu Ling Nethersole Hospital) being doctors. He attended Tak Sun Primary School, then Diocesan Boys' School, a predominantly English-language boys school, where he was a boarder. At the latter school, he chose to study French.

Lam started to pick up music at a young age, when his grandfather often took him to watch Chinese and Western movies, which exposed him to film music. His parents often played music around the house, and a sparked interest with listening to music on the radio led to him teaching himself to play the guitar. In 1965, Lam moved abroad to further his studies in the United Kingdom, attending Dover College and transferring to the Barcote School of Coaching, and United States. During this time at the latter school, he formed a folk song group, the Midnighters, with two friends of his. During his subsequent stay in the U.S., he began to experience a more diverse range of musical genres, which would greatly influence his work.

== Career ==
After his studies in the United Kingdom, Lam remained for a few years for work before moving to California, where he coached tennis and worked in a stock brokerage firm. It was during this time that Lam started writing his own songs. Not long thereafter, he returned to Hong Kong to launch his music career.

Lam started as one of the lead singers in the band "Jade". In 1976, he went solo with the release of his first eponymous English album, Lam. His first Cantonese album came out in 1978. In 1980, two of his compositions ("In The Middle of The Water"《在水中央》and "Need You Every Minute"《分分鐘需要你》) won Top Ten Chinese Gold Songs Awards. Throughout the 1980s, 23 of Lam's songs topped the RTHK Chinese Pop Chart, making him second only to Alan Tam, who had 28.

Self-producing, Lam creates most of his own albums and songs, as well as being especially involved with creative direction of his work outside its musical aspects. Lam has a wide vocal range and has interpreted and performed in many different genres of music.

His works are best known for pioneering a variety of genres in the Hong Kong music scene, such as creating the known first Cantorap, "Ah Lam's Diary", and the medley "10 Minutes 12 Inches" from multiple Cantopop hits, with the latter composition's interwoven intricacies creating a derivative for Lam's eponymous concert Lamusical with his own hits.

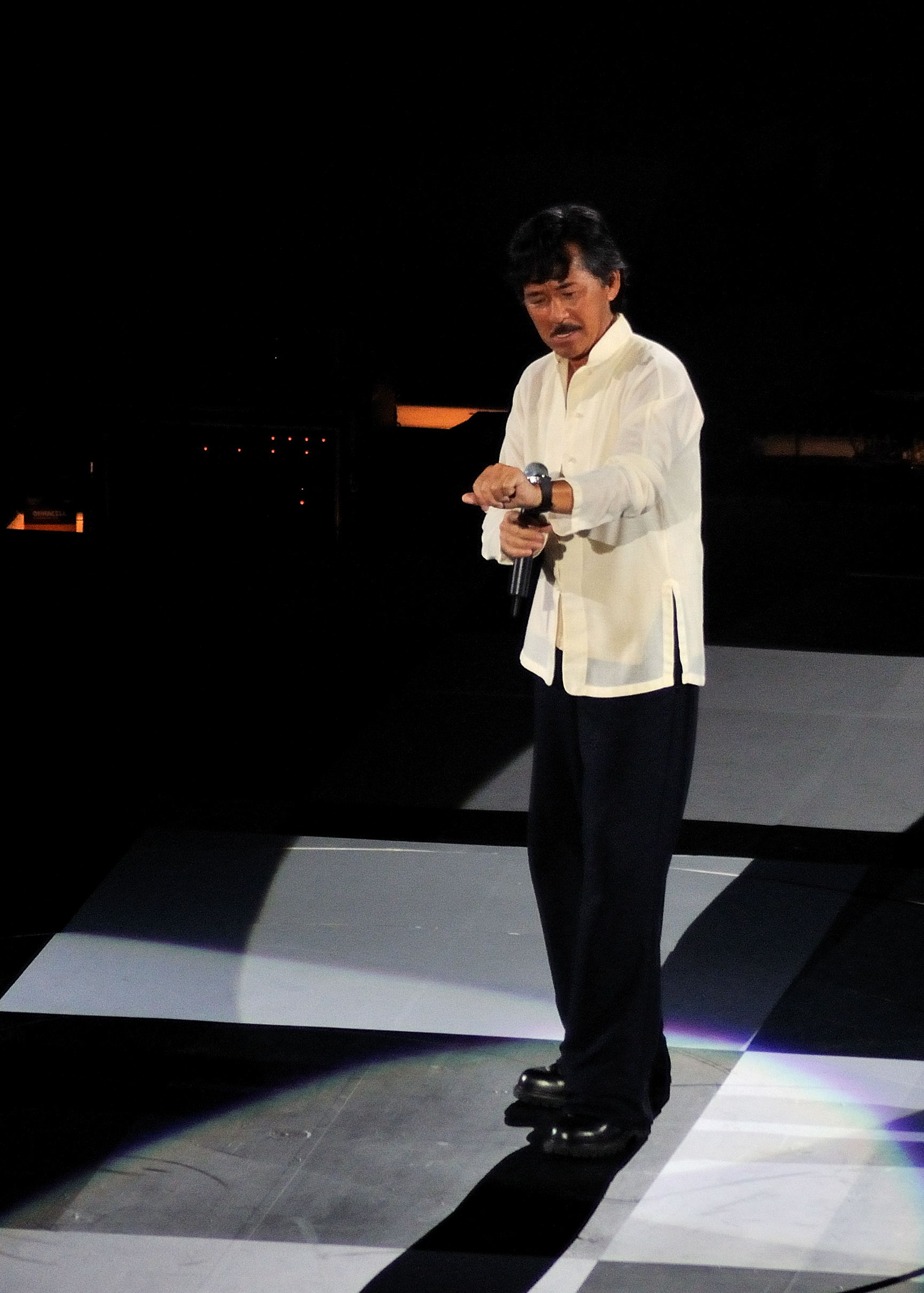
Lam performing in 2009

== Personal life ==
Lam married Ng Ching Yuen in 1980. Together, they have a son, Alex Lam, who is also a singer and actor, and a daughter April. Lam and Ng divorced in 1994. On 17 July 1996, he married singer and actress Sally Yeh.

Aside from his musical activities, Lam is a lover of sports and visual arts. Some of his particular ventures in sports is tennis and golf. In terms of visual arts, he has a special fondness for drawing mazes; one of his artworks was engraved onto a Lalique-produced crystal Buddha, with his collaboration lending itself as the French company's first collaboration with a Chinese artist. Lam also likes tailoring, often modifying clothes to his own taste.

During a May 2003 guest performance for Liza Wang at the Hong Kong Coliseum, Lam accidentally fell 2.5 metres through a stage floor opening. The accident injured his right ear, resulting in partial hearing loss, particularly in high frequencies, and tinnitus, leaving him hearing sounds in mono. A few months after his injury, he gave a series of concerts across southern China for the purpose of acclimating himself to performing with his altered hearing.

== Artistry ==
=== Musical style ===
Lam's experiences abroad is the strongest influence within his work, where he has introduced a wide variety of song styles to the Hong Kong pop music scene, with many originals and covers becoming Cantopop classics. His work encompasses a wide stylistic range, from country rock, rhythm and blues, rock and roll, funk, jazz, rap, traditional Chinese songs, to tango and bossa nova.

When producing covers, he taps into a wide variety of countries and regions, spanning from western Europe to particular Asian countries like Japan and South Korea. The pieces he selects to cover range in genres from folk songs, classical music, and jazz musicals, to funk and rock and roll.

=== Voice and timbre ===
Lam has been regarded to have a very wide tenor range, with his highest notes reaching F5, D#6 in full voice and volume, and his lowest notes is the G2.

== Controversy and in popular culture ==
=== Sunglasses theft and penalty ===
In 1999, while travelling in Hawaii, United States, George Lam was arrested for leaving a store wearing unpaid sunglasses. He later pleaded guilty in court and acquired a criminal record. In November, 2026, when Gan Ai Gan Zuo, the 1987 Cantonese cover of Nothing's Gonna Stop Us Now was included in Grand Theft Auto VI playlist, there are altered pictures altering Jason's with his face and sunglasses on the hand of Lucia, some even altered to his wife - Sally Yeh.

== Awards and achievements ==
Lam's four decade-long career has shaped a significant part of the Hong Kong music scene. Many of today's top Cantopop singers such as Eason Chan, Hacken Lee, and Andy Lau have been influenced by his music. In an interview, George Lam confirmed he encouraged Andy Lau to be a singer when the two of them met during a movie filming.

In recognition of his contribution to music, Lam has received numerous accolades, including the Golden Needle Award in 1994, the CASH Hall of Fame Award in 2003, the J.S.G. Lifetime Achievement Award in 2015, and the RTHK Hall of Fame Award in 2016.

Name of the award ceremony, year presented, type of award, category of the award, nominee of the award, and the result of the nomination
Award ceremony	Year	Category	Nominee(s) / Work(s)	Result	Ref.
Hong Kong Film Awards	1982	Best Actor	Boat People 《投奔怒海》	Nominated	
Hong Kong Film Awards	1983	Best Original Film Song	All the Wrong Spies《我愛夜來香》	Nominated	
Hong Kong Film Awards	1984	Best Original Film Song	The Owl vs Bombo 《貓頭鷹與小飛象》	Nominated	
Hong Kong Film Awards	1985	Best Original Film Song	Lost Romance	Nominated	
Hong Kong Film Awards	1986	Best Original Film Song	Passion《最愛》	Won	
Hong Kong Film Awards	1988	Best Original Film Song	Starry is the Night 《今夜星光燦爛》	Nominated	
Hong Kong Film Awards	2007	Best Original Film Song	The Pye-Dog	Nominated	
Top Ten Chinese Gold Songs Award	1994	Golden Needle Award	Himself	Won	
CASH Hall of Fame Award	2003	—N/a	Himself	Won	
J.S.G. Lifetime Achievement Award	2015	—N/a	Himself	Won	
RTHK Hall of Fame Award	2016	—N/a	Himself	Won	

== Discography ==
List of albums including release year and language
Year	Title	Language	Ref.
1976	Lam	English	
1977	Lam II	English	
1978	Teresa Carpio & Lam	English	
1978	各師各法	Cantonese	
1979	抉擇	Cantonese	
1980	摩登土佬	Cantonese	
1980	一個人	Cantonese	
1981	活色生香	Cantonese	
1982	海市蜃樓	Cantonese	
1983	愛情故事	Cantonese	
1984	愛到發燒	Cantonese	
1984	林子祥創作歌集	Cantonese	
1985	林子祥85特輯 (LAM '85)	Cantonese	
1985	十分十二吋 (12" Single)	Cantonese	
1985	誘惑	Cantonese	
1986	最愛	Cantonese	
1986	千億個夜晚	Cantonese	
1987	花街70號	Cantonese	
1988	林子祥創作+流行歌集	Cantonese	
1988	生命之曲	Cantonese	
1989	林子祥長青歌集	Cantonese	
1990	十三子祥	Cantonese	
1990	日落日出	Cantonese	
1990	Lessons	English	
1991	小說歌集	Cantonese	
1991	這是你是真的傷了我的心	Mandarin	
1992	這樣愛過你	Mandarin	
1992	最難忘的你	Cantonese	
1992	祈望	Cantonese	
1993	'93創作歌集	Cantonese	
1993	When a Man Loves a Woman	English	
1993	決定	Mandarin	
1994	單手拍掌	Cantonese	
1995	感謝	Mandarin	
1996	緣是這樣	Cantonese	
1997	好氣連祥	Cantonese	
1998	現代人新曲+精選	Cantonese	
1998	尋祥歌	Mandarin	
2001	只有林子祥	Cantonese	
2004	Until We Meet Again	Cantonese	
2007	佐治地球轉	Cantonese	
2010	Lamusique	Cantonese	
2011	Lamusique Vintage	Cantonese	
2014	LAMUSIC Original Classics	Cantonese	
2015	佐治地球40年	Cantonese	

== Filmography ==
Adapted from his IMDB profile.

Year	Title		Role	Notes	Ref.
Year	English Title	Chinese Title	Role	Notes	Ref.
1978	Luckies Trio	各師各法			
1979	Money Trip	懵女，大賊，傻偵探			
1979	The Secret	瘋劫			
1980	Disco Bumpkins	摩登土佬			
1980	Confused Hero	糊塗英雄			
1981	All the Wrong Clues for the Right Solution	鬼馬智多星	Yoho		
1981	Life After Life	再生人			
1982	Aces Go Places	最佳拍檔	Ambulance Driver	Cameo	
1982	It Takes Two	難兄難弟	Olive Peddler		
1982	Boat People	投奔怒海	Shiomi Akutagawa		
1983	All the Wrong Spies	我愛夜來香			
1984	Banana Cops	英倫琵琶			
1984	The Owl vs Bombo	貓頭鷹與小飛象	Wong "Owl Wong" Yan-Fu		
1985	Kung Hei Fat Choy	恭喜發財	"Mo"		
1985	Twinkle, Twinkle Lucky Stars	夏日福星			
1985	It's a Drink, It's a Bomb	聖誕奇遇結良緣			
1985	Lost Romance				
1986	Passion	最愛			
1987	Easy Money	通天大盜			
1988	Heart to Hearts	三人世界			
1988	Starry is the Night	今夜星光燦爛			
1989	Perfect Match	最佳男朋友			
1989	Heart into Hearts	三人新世界			
1990	A Bite of Love	一咬OK			
1990	Shanghai Shanghai	亂世兒女			
1991	The Banquet	豪門夜宴	Prince Alibaba of Kuwait		
1991	The Perfect Match	富貴吉祥	Koo		
1992	Heart Against Hearts	三人做世界			
1993	Perfect Couples	皆大歡喜			
1997	A Queer Story	基佬四十			
1997	Up for the Rising Sun	擁抱朝陽			
2003	Love Under the Sun	愛在陽光下			
2004	Six Strong Guys	六壯士			
2006	Love at First Note	戀愛初歌			
2007	The Pye-Dog				
2007	Wonder Women				
2009	Look for a Star	游龍戲鳳	"Sharky"		
2011	Hi, Fidelity	出軌的女人			
2018	Europe Raiders		"Mercury"		
2021	Singing With Legends	我们的歌3	Senior Singer	Variety Show	

== Concerts ==
Concert by year, title, venue, and city
Year	Title		Venue	City	Ref.
Year	English Title	Chinese Title	Venue	City	Ref.
1976	Teresa Carpio & George Lam Concert			Hong Kong	
1981		林子祥Show		Hong Kong	
1983		林子祥演唱會		Hong Kong	
1985		林子祥85演唱會		Hong Kong	
1987		林子祥演唱會		Hong Kong	
1988-1989	LAM 88-89 LIVE			Hong Kong	
1990-1991		特醇星徽林子祥90演唱會		Hong Kong	
1992-1993		白花油林子祥有情演唱會		Hong Kong	
1995	95 Lam in Live	林子祥寄廿載情演唱會95		Hong Kong	
1998		林子祥葉蒨文好氣連場98		Hong Kong	
2001	Live Contact Lam 2001	最愛接觸林子祥演唱會		Hong Kong	
2001		01年拉闊壓軸 林子祥&陳奕迅音樂會		Hong Kong	
2002		港樂·林子祥HKPO & Lam Live		Hong Kong	
2005	"Always" Lam in Concert	子有祥情林子祥演唱會		Hong Kong	
2007	Teresa & Lam Live at the HK Coliseum 2007	仍然最愛林子祥杜麗莎演唱會	Hong Kong Coliseum	Hong Kong	
2009	Lam@Coliseum	十分十二子祥演唱會	Hong Kong Coliseum	Hong Kong	
2010		Lam Made in Love 音樂會		Hong Kong	
2011	Music is Love George Lam X Hacken Lee	林子祥x李克勤 拉闊音樂會2011		Hong Kong	
2011-2012	Vintage Lamusic Concert			Hong Kong	
2013		絕對熹祥- A Mix & Match Concert with 林子祥 & 趙增熹		Hong Kong	
2016	George Lam 40th Anniversary Concert	林子祥佐治地球四十年演唱會		Hong Kong	
2016		越唱越響40年演唱會		Hong Kong	
2018		越唱越響40年演唱會		Hong Kong	
2019	Lamusical2019	林子祥 Lamusical 2019 演唱會		Hong Kong	
2019		林子祥開心演唱會 The Smiling Concert		Hong Kong	
2020		林子祥開心演唱會 The Smiling Concert		Hong Kong	
2022		林子祥開心演唱會 香港站		Hong Kong	
2023		林子祥開心賀歲演唱會		Hong Kong	
2023-2024		林子祥50堅演唱會		Hong Kong	

Awards
Preceded by Cheng Kwok-kong	Golden Needle Award of RTHK Top Ten Chinese Gold Songs Award; 1994	Succeeded by Teresa Teng
