= Olivia Cheng (Hong Kong actress) =

Hong Kong actress

Olivia Cheng Man Nga
- Born: February 14, 1960 (age 66)
- Occupations: Golf trainer; former golf player; former model; former actress
- Spouse: Jeffrey Yu (m. 1991)
- Awards: Miss Hong Kong 1979

Chinese name
- Traditional Chinese: 鄭文雅
- Simplified Chinese: 郑文雅
Transcriptions
Standard Mandarin
- Hanyu Pinyin: Zhèng wén yǎ
- Website: Olivia Cheng on Facebook

Olivia Cheng Man Nga (Chinese: 鄭文雅; born 14 February 1960), is a Hong Kong–based former actress.

== Background ==
She won the 1979 Miss Hong Kong Pageant and was also elected "Miss Photogenic." She represented Hong Kong in Miss Universe 1979 in Perth, Western Australia, where she went unplaced but ranked a very respectable 21st place in the preliminary swimsuit competition. Cheng created a controversy when she joined ATV (the arch-rival of TVB, the organiser of the Miss Hong Kong pageant) immediately after crowning her successor in 1980. This incident embarrassed TVB so much that in 1981, TVB decided to sign 1.5-year contracts with all Miss Hong Kong winners so that they had to stay with TVB for at least 6 months after their reign was over.

Subsequently, Cheng she was the cover model of the first issue of Playboy magazine's Hong Kong edition, appearing in a topless pictorial inside. More pictures from the same photo session, filmed by Kevin Orpin in Boracay, later appeared as a large format book.

She was married to business executive Jeffrey Yu in 1991.

A high jump champion in secondary school, Cheng was known for her sporty and active image. She is a golf pro and teaches golf now.

== Filmography ==
Year	Title	Role	Notes
1980	The Spooky Bunch		
1982	Till Death Do We Scare	Irene Leen	
1982	Shen tan guang tou mei	Elana Mann	
1983	Feng xie		
1983	Shao ye Wei Wei		
1984	Zi jin xiong di		
1984	Mr. Virgin	Ah Ling	
1984	Yau friend mou ging	Ann	
1984	Hua xin luo bo		
1984	A Family Affair	Nancy Yeung	
1985	Hong Kong Graffiti	Susan Yang	
1985	Why Me?	Koko	
1986	Millionaire's Express	Siu-hon	
1986	The Missed Date	May	
1986	United We Stand	Olivia Cheng	
1987	Sapporo Story		
1987	The Happy Bigamist		
1989	Mr. Coconut	Ping	
1989	The Wild Ones	Sandy Kwong	
1989	Wo wei cheng nian	Sandy Kwong	
1990	A Killer's Blues	Wai	
1990	Trouble Couple		Video
1991	Blue Lightning	Ellen Fong	(final film role)

Achievements
Preceded by Winnie Chan	Miss Hong Kong; 1979	Succeeded by Wanda Tai
