= Cora Miao =

Hong Kong actress

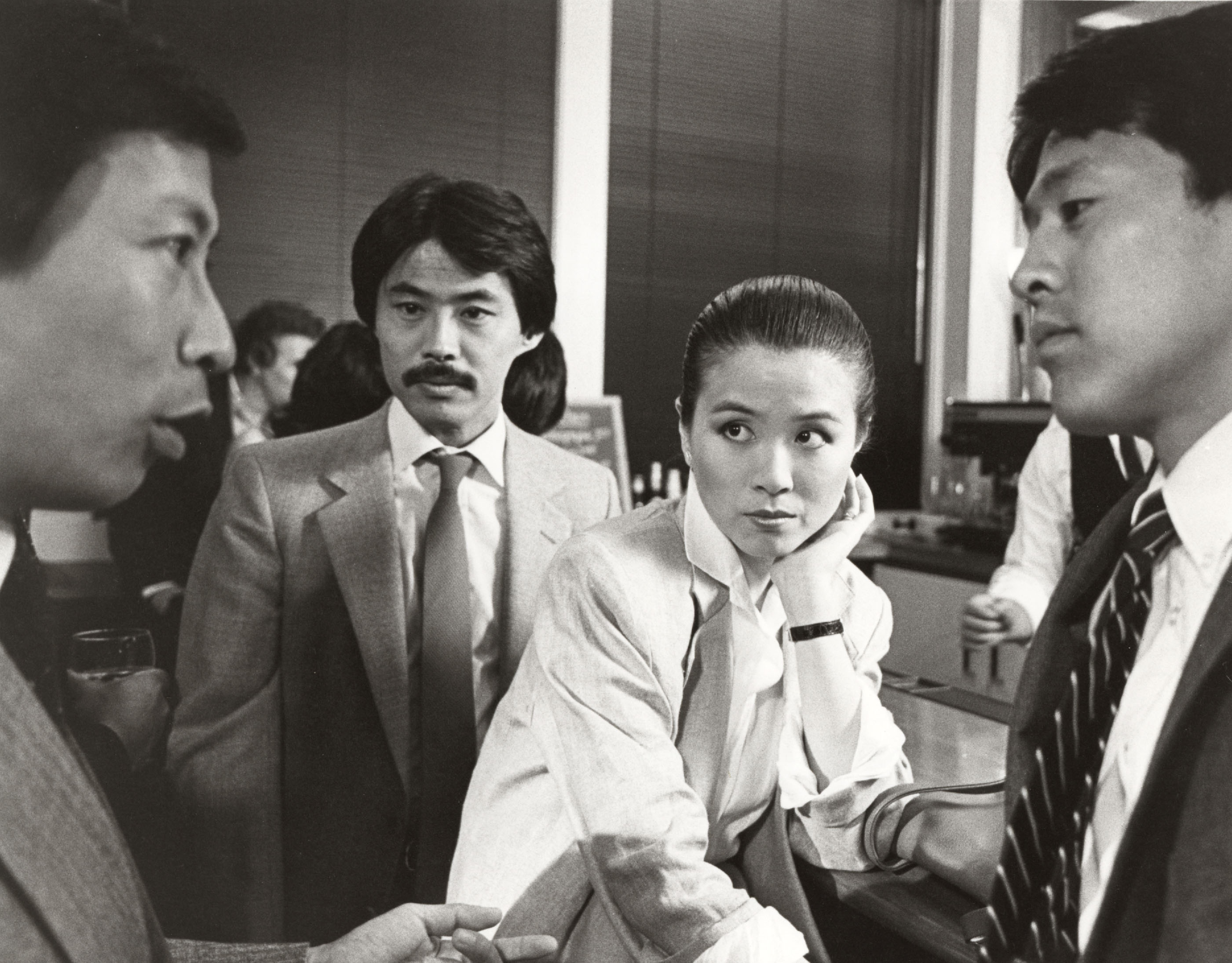
- Miao in 1983
- Born: August 21, 1958 (age 67); Shanghai, China
- Other name: Hin-yen Miu
- Occupation: Actress
- Years active: 1977–1990
- Spouse: Wayne Wang

Cora Miao
- Traditional Chinese: 繆騫人
- Simplified Chinese: 缪骞人
Transcriptions
Standard Mandarin
- Hanyu Pinyin: Miào Qiānrén
Yue: Cantonese
- Jyutping: Miu6 Hin1jan4

Cora Miao (traditional Chinese: 繆騫人; simplified Chinese: 缪骞人; Jyutping: Miu6 Hin1jan4; pinyin: Miào Qiānrén; born 21 August 1958) is a Hong Kong actress. She was nominated for four Hong Kong Film Awards and four Golden Horse Awards, winning once.

Miao was born in Shanghai, China, and later studied in the United States, where she graduated before returning to Hong Kong. In 1976, she won the Miss Photogenic title at the Miss Hong Kong Pageant. She began her acting career the following year and became known for her performances in films such as The Story of Woo Viet and Women.

She is married to film director Wayne Wang.

== Filmography ==
=== Film ===
Year	Title	Role	Notes
1977	Chu shu		
1978	Gou yao gou gu	Ah-Sha	
1979	Itchy Fingers		
1979	Money Trip		
1980	Ban ye		
1980	Meng nu da zei sha zhen tan		
1981	The Story of Woo Viet	Li Lap-Quan	
1982	Lang lai le		
1982	Boat People	Nguyen's Mistress	as Cora Chien-Jen Miao
1984	Love in a Fallen City	Pai Liu-So	
1985	Dim Sum: A Little Bit of Heart	Julia	
1985	Women	Liang Bo-Er	
1986	Passion	Ming	
1986	The Terrorizers	Zhou Yufang	
1988	Keep on Dancing		
1988	Wo ai tai kong ren	Connie	
1989	Eat a Bowl of Tea	Mei Oi	
1989	Life Is Cheap... But Toilet Paper Is Expensive	Money	
1989	Running Mate		
1990	Wu niu		as Hin-yen Miu
1990	Goodbye Hero	Tony's Wife	
1991	Ming yueh chi shih yuen	Wang To-hung	

=== Television ===
Year	Title	Role	Notes
1976–1978	Luk Siu-fung	Suet	
1977	13		

== Awards and nominations ==
Golden Horse Film Festival
Year	Film	Result	Award	Category
1985	Women	Nominated	Golden Horse Award	Best Actress
1986	Terrorizers	Nominated	Golden Horse Award	Best Actress
1986	Passion	Won	Golden Horse Award	Best Supporting Actress
1988	Love in a Fallen City	Nominated	Golden Horse Award	Best Actress

Hong Kong Film Awards
Year	Film	Result	Award	Category
1983	Boat People	Nominated	HKFA	Best Actress
1986	Women	Nominated	HKFA	Best Actress
1989	The Other ½ & the Other ½	Nominated	HKFA	Best Supporting Actress
1989	Keep on Dancing	Nominated	HKFA	Best Actress
