= Bonnie Law =

Hong Kong actress and singer

Bonnie Law (September 11, 1968 – May 27, 2016) was a Hong Kong actress and singer. She was best known for her role in the 1984 Hong Kong comedic film, Happy Ghost, opposite Raymond Wong. Happy Ghost marked her film debut at the age of 15. Law and several of her co-stars, including Rachel Lee, May Lo and Fennie Yuen became known as the "Happy Girls" because of their roles in the comedy.

Law's other 1980s films during the next four years included For Your Heart Only, opposite Leslie Cheung in 1985, and Fractured Follies in 1988, which starred Chow Yun-fat. Her television roles included the dramatic series, My Father's Son, starring Stephen Chow and Ha Yu.

Law left acting after just four years in order to study abroad. In 1993, Law returned to Hong Kong to work in the finance and business sectors. However, she made small cameos in film and television, including The Conman in 1998.

Law was planning a return to acting at the time of her death in 2016. She died suddenly from a heart attack on May 27, 2016, at age of 47 at Queen Mary Hospital, Hong Kong.
