= Kent Cheng =

Hong Kong actor and director

- 鄭則士
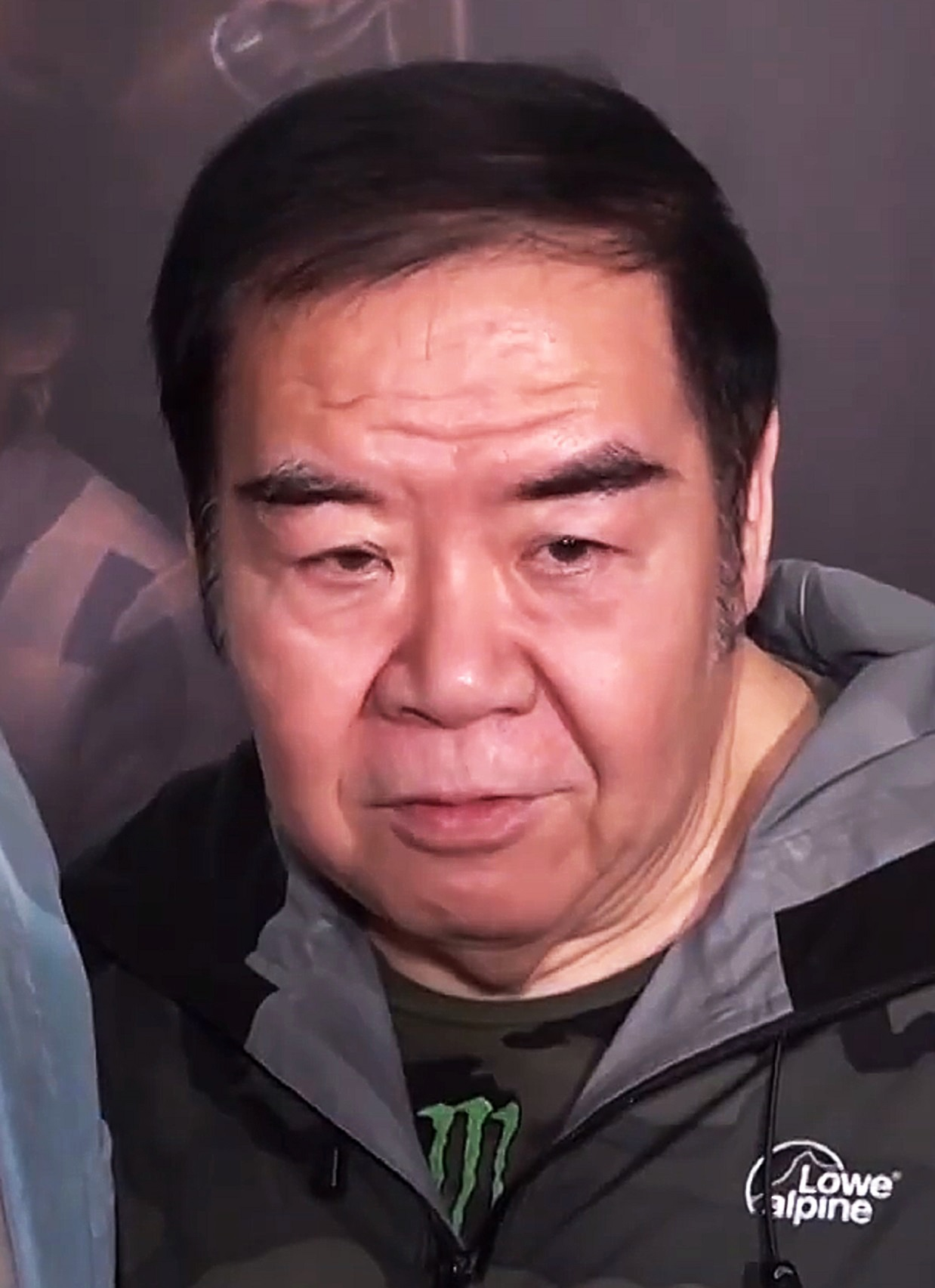
- Cheng in November 2019
- Born: Cheng Jak-si; British Hong Kong
- Awards: Hong Kong Film Awards – Best Actor; 1985 Why Me? 1996 The Log Golden Bauhinia Awards – Best Actor; 1996 The Log

Chinese name
- Traditional Chinese: 鄭則士
- Simplified Chinese: 郑则士
Transcriptions
Standard Mandarin
- Hanyu Pinyin: Zhèng Zéshì
Yue: Cantonese
- Jyutping: Zeng6 Zak1si6

Kent Cheng Jak-si is a Hong Kong film and television actor. He is a two time recipient of the Hong Kong Film Award for Best Actor.

== Biography ==
Cheng was born in a poor family in Hong Kong. He intended to be an actor when he was a child, written on his comprehension. However, the comprehension was seriously criticised by his teacher.

Cheng joined a film company in 1972, but he could not gain any position in that film company, until joining TVB in 1976. Since then he became an actor for several TV dramas.

In the 1980s, he changed his focus in acting in films and directing. In 1985 he won the Best Actor award in the Hong Kong Film Awards for his role in the film called Why Me?. Cheng won again in 1996.

Cheng opened a film company in the 1990s, but failed and struggled through financial problems during the late 1990s. He thus returned to be an actor for TVB in 1993. However, Cheng could not gain a leading role, so he decided to turn to ATV in 1997.

In recent years he focused in mainland China. In 2006, he returned to TVB.

== Filmography ==
=== Film ===
Year	Title	Role	Notes
1981	Emperor and His Brother		
1982	The Perfect Match		
1983	Give Me Back		Nominated – Hong Kong Film Award for Best Actor
1984	Crazy Kung Fu Master		
1984	Beloved Daddy		Nominated – Hong Kong Film Award for Best Actor
1985	Why Me?	Fei Mao	Hong Kong Film Award for Best Actor; Nominated – Golden Horse Awards for Best Actor
1986	Lucky Stars Go Places		
1986	United We Stand		
1987	Heartbeat 100		
1988	The Dragon Family	Uncle Po	
1988	Walk on Fire	Mother Tang	
1989	The Fortune Code		
1989	Mr. Smart		
1989	Run, Don't Walk	Sergeant Leung	
1990	Dragon in Jail		
1990	The Magic Amethyst		
1990	Ghost Legend	Chor Yat	
1991	Lethal Contact		
1991	To Be Number One		Nominated – Hong Kong Film Award for Best Supporting Actor
1991	Once Upon a Time in China	Lam Sai-wing	
1992	Dr. Lamb	Fat Bing	
1993	A Roof with a View	Fat Ho (uncredited)	
1993	Man of the Times	Chan Chi Chiu	
1993	Crime Story	Inspector Hung Ting-bong	Nominated – Hong Kong Film Award for Best Supporting Actor; Nominated: Golden Horse Awards for Best Actor
1993	Hero of Hong Kong 1949		
1993	Lord of East China Sea II	Chief Wong	
1993	Lord of East China Sea	Chief Wong	
1993	The Kidnapping of Wong Chak Fai	Chung	
1993	Flirting Scholar 2	Fat Cat (uncredited)	
1993	Cohabitation		
1993	Run and Kill	Cheng 'Fatty' Kau Ng	
1994	Mermaid Got Married		
1994	The Gods Must Be Funny In China		
1994	The Bodyguard from Beijing		
1996	he Log		Hong Kong Film Award for Best Actor; Golden Bauhinia Awards for Best Actor
1996	Wong Fei Hung Series	Lam Sai-wing	Tsui Hark production
2003	Happy Go Lucky		
2007	Flash Point		
2008	Run Papa Run		
2008	Out of Control		
2010	Ip Man 2	Fatso	
2011	Sleepwalker		
2012	Good-for-Nothing Heros		
2014	Who is Undercover		
2015	Ip Man 3	Fatso	
2017	Chasing the Dragon	Piggy	
2018	The Big Rescue		
2018	The Leaker		
2019	The White Storm 2 - Drug Lords		
2019	Hypnotize the Jury		
2019	Ip Man 4	Fatso	
2021	Once Upon a Time in Hong Kong	Pudgy	
2024	The Prosecutor	Bao Ding	

=== Television ===
Year	Title	Role	Awards	Network
1976	Hotel			TVB
1978	The Giant	Law Kwan		TVB
1978	The Heaven Sword and Dragon Saber			TVB
1979	The Sword of Romance	Muk-yung Ching		TVB
1981	The Misadventure of Zoo			TVB
1996	In the Name of Love	Ho Ka-bon		TVB
1997	The Hitman Chronicles	Zhuan Zhu		TVB
1997	Forrest Cat	Lai Ting-on		ATV
1999	Forrest Cast II	Wong Ka-po		ATV
2002	Law 2002	Law Yau-dai		ATV
2004	Asian Charlie's Angels	Bosley		ImaginAsian
2006	The Blind Detective			ATV
2006	Romance of Red Dust	Yang Su		CTV
2008	A Journey Called Life	Kam Shek		TVB
2009	A Watchdog's Tale	Lai Tsun-sing		TVB
2010	When Lanes Merge	Ho Kau	Nominated – TVB Award for Best Actor; Nominated – TVB Award for My Favourite Male Character	TVB
2012	The Greatness of a Hero	Dit Yan-kit		TVB
2012	King Maker	Tung Chiu		TVB
2012	Wonderful Declarations from a Daughter-in-Law			
2015	Best Get Going			
2016	My Dangerous Mafia Retirement Plan	Ho Kei-sung		TVB
2019	I Bet Your Pardon	Longsi		TVB
2019	My Life As Loan Shark	Tai Kam-chai / Tai Yuen-bo		TVB
2020	Line Walker: Bull Fight	Sun Chi-kin		TVB
2024	Broken Trust	Chin Tai-hoi		TVB

Awards and achievements
Preceded by Danny Lee Sau-Yin for Law with Two Phases	Hong Kong Film Awards for Best Actor; 1986 for Why Me?	Succeeded by Chow Yun-fat for A Better Tomorrow
Preceded by Roy Chiao for Summer Snow	Hong Kong Film Awards for Best Actor; 1997 for The Log	Succeeded by Tony Leung Chiu-Wai for Happy Together
