= Bruce Lee filmography =

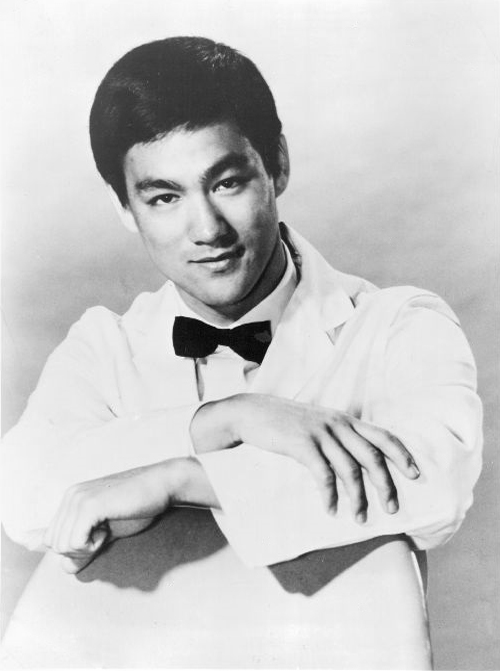
- Lee as Kato in the television series The Green Hornet (August 1967)
- Film: 37
- Television series: 20
- Documentary: 52
- Others: 102

This article details the filmography of Hong Kong-American actor and martial artist Bruce Lee.

Several of Lee's films premiered after his death, including Enter the Dragon, Game of Death, and Circle of Iron.

== Filmography ==
=== Feature films ===
Year	Title	Chinese title	Role	Notes
1941	Golden Gate Girl	金門女		As an infant
1946	The Birth of Mankind	人类的诞生		
1948	Wealth is Like a Dream	富貴浮雲		
1949	Sai See in the Dream	夢裡西施	Yam Lee	
1949	The Story of Fan Lei-fa			
1950	The Kid	細路祥	Kid Cheung	Alternate title: My Son, Ah Chung. Available on region 1 English-subtitled DVD from Cinema Epoch.
1950	Blooms and Butterflies			
1951	Infancy	人之初	Ngau	
1953	A Myriad Homes	千萬人家		
1953	Blame it on Father	父之過		Alternate title: Father's Fault
1953	The Guiding Light	苦海明燈	Son as teenager	Available on region 1 English-subtitled DVD from Cinema Epoch / Alternate title: A Son Is Born
1953	A Mother's Tears	慈母淚		Alternate title: A Mother Remembers
1953	In the Face of Demolition	危樓春曉		
1955	An Orphan's Tragedy	孤星血淚	Frank Wong (child)	Available on region 1 English-subtitled DVD from Cinema Epoch
1955	Orphan's Song	孤兒行		
1955	Love	愛		
1955	Love Part 2	愛(下集)		
1955	We Owe It to Our Children	兒女債		Alternate title: The More the Merrier
1955	The Faithful Wife			
1956	The Wise Guys Who Fool Around	詐痲納福		
1956	Too Late For Divorce	早知當初我唔嫁		
1957	The Thunderstorm	雷雨	Chow Chung	Based on the play Lei Yu by Cao Yu
1957	Darling Girl			
1960	The Orphan	人海孤鴻	Sam	In his last Hong Kong widely released film until 1971
1968	The Wrecking Crew	風流特務勇破迷魂陣		Action director
1969	Marlowe	醜聞喋血	Winslow Wong	Also action director
1970	A Walk in the Spring Rain	春雨漫步	Action Director	Lee, personal friend of producer Stirling Silliphant, is credited as the film's fight choreographer.
1971	The Big Boss	唐山大兄	Cheng Chao-an	Also action director Alternate title: Fists of Fury (Note: When The Big Boss was being prepared for American distribution, the U.S. release was to be re-titled The Chinese Connection, a play on the popular The French Connection, since both dealt with drug trafficking. The U.S. title of Lee's second film, Fist of Fury, was to be kept nearly the same, except using the plural Fists. However, the titles were accidentally reversed. The Big Boss was released as Fists of Fury and Fist of Fury became The Chinese Connection.); In his first Hong Kong widely released film since 1960
1972	Fist of Fury	精武門	Chen Zhen	Also action director Alternate title: The Chinese Connection
1972	The Way of the Dragon	猛龍過江	Tang Lung	Also producer, director, action director and screenwriter The film was released in the U.S. after Enter the Dragon; hence the alternate title: Return of the Dragon
1972	The Game of Death	死亡的遊戲	Hai Tien	Also producer, director, action director and screenwriter. Unfinished because of Bruce Lee's death. Released posthumously: films and documentaries
1973	Fist of Unicorn	麒麟掌		Action Director and fight choreographer

=== Released posthumously ===
Year	Title	Chinese title	Role	Notes
1973	Enter the Dragon	龍爭虎鬥	Lee	Also action director and writer Released six days after Lee's death
1974	The Green Hornet	青蜂侠	Kato	A compilation of episodes from the TV series edited together and released as a feature film Released one year after Lee's death
1976	The Fury of the Dragon	巨龙之怒	Kato	A compilation of episodes from the TV series edited together and released as a feature film Released three years after Lee's death
1978	Game of Death	死亡遊戲	Billy Lo	There are two versions of this film, each one with a different plot (the original from an incomplete 1972 film and the 1978 build doing a "footage mashup"); Lee was shown in incomplete original footage from 1972, plus stock footage from Enter the Dragon and other films The original was finally released as a short film in the year 2000.
1978	Circle of Iron			Co-writer; Alternate title: The Silent Flute; Film co-written by Bruce Lee, who was seeking to illustrate the differences between Eastern and Western philosophies
1981	Game of Death II	死亡塔	Billy Lo / Lee Chen-chiang	Alternate title: Tower of Death; Unrelated to the first Game of Death, it was marketed as a sequel in the U.S. Lee appears in stock footage from Enter the Dragon and other films

=== Box office performance ===
Year	Title	Gross revenue (est. US$)		Budget (US$)	ROI profit	Ref.
Year	Title	Nominal	Inflation	Budget (US$)	ROI profit	Ref.
1968	The Wrecking Crew	$8,000,000	$74,000,000	?	?	(Note: In the United States and Canada, the film earned $2.4 million in theatrical rentals. This was equivalent to estimated box office gross receipts of approximately $8 million.)
1971	The Big Boss (Fists of Fury)	$50,000,000	$400,000,000	$100,000	50,000%	(Note: See The Big Boss § Box office)
1972	Fist of Fury (The Chinese Connection)	$100,000,000	$770,000,000	$100,000	100,000%	(Note: See Fist of Fury § Box office)
1972	Way of the Dragon (Return of the Dragon)	$130,000,000	$920,000,000	$130,000	100,000%	(Note: See The Way of the Dragon § Box office)
1973	Enter the Dragon	$400,000,000	$2,000,000,000	$850,000	47,000%	(Note: See Enter the Dragon § Box office)
1978	Game of Death	$50,320,736	$250,000,000	$850,000	5,900%	(Note: See Game of Death § Box office)
1978	Circle of Iron	$2,600,000	$13,000,000	?	?	(Note: See Circle of Iron § Box office)
1981	Game of Death II	$349,181	$1,200,000	?	?	(Note: See Game of Death II § Box office)
	Total	$741,269,917	$4,428,200,000	$2,030,000	100,000%	
	Average	$92,658,740	$554,000,000	$406,000	37,000%	

== Television appearances ==
Year	Title	Chinese title	Role	Country and channel	Notes
1966	The Green Hornet	青蜂侠	Kato	U.S. – ABC	Alternate title: The Kato Show (Hong Kong title); 1966–1967
1966	Where the Action Is		Himself	U.S. – ABC	
1967	Batman	蝙蝠俠	Kato	U.S. – ABC	Visiting hero Episodes: "The Spell of Tut", "A Piece of the Action" and "Batman's Satisfaction"
1967	Ironside	無敵鐵探長	Leon Soo	U.S. – NBC	Guest star Episode: "Tagged for Murder"
1968	Blondie		Mr. Yoto, Karate Instructor	U.S. – CBS	Guest star Episode: "Pick on a Bully Your Own Size"
1969	Here Come the Brides	新娘駕到	Lin	U.S. – ABC	Guest star Episode: "Marriage, Chinese Style"
1970	Enjoy Yourself Tonight	歡樂今宵	Himself	Hong Kong – TVB	
1971	Longstreet	血灑長街	Li Tsung / Fight Choreographer	U.S. – ABC	Appeared in four episodes: "The Way of the Intercepting Fist", "Spell Legacy Like Death", "Wednesday's Child" and "I See, Said the Blind Man"
1971	The Pierre Berton Show		Himself	Canada – Screen Gems	
1993	Fame in the Twentieth Century		Himself	U.K. – BBC	
1999	Famous Families		Himself	U.S. – FOX	Episode: "The Lees: Action Speaks Louder"
2003	I Love the '70s		Lee	U.S. – MTV	
2007	La Rentadora		Himself	Spain – TV3	Episode: "Be Water My Friend"
2008	Dragonland – L'urlo di Chen terrorizza ancora l'occidente		Himself	Italy – Canale 21	
2009	How Bruce Lee Changed the World		Himself	U.S. – TVPG	
2011	Bruce Lee Lives!		Himself	U.S. – TVPG	
2015	Too Young To Die		Himself	Germany – Broadview TV	"Bruce Lee: Die Faust Hollywoods"
2017	Autopsy: The Last Hours of... Bruce Lee		Himself	U.S. – TV-14	
2018	ITV Celebrities Interviews		Himself	France – ITV	"La Grand Émission 2018 Sur Bruce Lee"
2021	History's Greatest Mysteries		Himself	U.S. – A&E	Season 2, Episode 3: "The Death of Bruce Lee"

Note: all the series produced after Lee's death (1973) feature archival footage of Lee.

== Documentaries ==
Year	Documentary title	Chinese title	Notes
1973	Bruce Lee: The Man and the Legend	李小龍的生與死	Updated in 1984 and re-titled Bruce Lee: The Legend
1973	The Real Bruce Lee		
1973	The Last Days of Bruce Lee		
1974	Kung Fu Killers		
1976	The Young Bruce Lee		
1984	Bruce Lee: The Legend	李小龍的生與死(下)	Golden Harvest tribute; focused on their films starring Lee. Featured on the Hong Kong Legends Bruce Lee: The Man and the Legend DVD.
1990	The Best of the Martial Arts Films	金裝武術電影大全	
1990	Bruce Lee – Best of the Best		
1992	Bruce Lee and Kung Fu Mania		
1992	Spirit of the Dragon		
1993	Top Fighter		
1993	Dragon: The Bruce Lee Story		
1993	Bruce Lee: The Curse of the Dragon		Included on Enter the Dragon DVDs and Blu-rays
1993	Death by Misadventure		
1993	Martial Arts Master		
1994	Bruce Lee: The Lost Interview		
1994	Cinema of Vengeance		History of martial arts cinema with clips of Lee
1994	Bruce Lee: The Immortal Dragon		Biography episode; available on DVD
1994	The Life of Bruce Lee		
1997	Secrets of the Warrior's Power		
1998	The Intercepting Fist		
1998	Bruce Lee: The Path of the Dragon		
1998	Bruce Lee: In His Own Words		Featurette on Enter the Dragon DVDs and Blu-rays
1998	Mystic Origins of the Martial Arts		
1998	The Immortal Masters		
1998	Jackie Chan: My Story	成龍的傳奇	
1999	Century Hero		
1999	Hollywood Screen Tests: Take 2		
2000	Bruce Lee: A Warrior's Journey	李小龍：死亡遊戲之旅	Found as a special feature on the 2004 DVD release of Enter the Dragon. Also on HD DVD and Blu-ray.
2000	Bruce Lee in G.O.D.: Shibōteki Yūgi	Bruce Lee in G.O.D. 死亡的遊戲	
2000	The Unbeatable Bruce Lee		
2002	Bruce Lee: The Legend Lives On		
2002	The Art of Action: Martial Arts in Motion Picture	功夫片歲月	
2002	Jackie Chan: Fast, Funny and Furious		
2002	Modern Warriors		
2003	Cinema Hong Kong: Kung Fu	電影香江：功夫世家	
2004	Dragon: Since 1973	龍：一九七三以後	
2008	The Legend of Bruce Lee	李小龍傳奇	It was aired in many parts of the world: China (CCTV), Iran (IRIB), Brazil (Rede CNT; Band), Italy (RAI 4), United States (KTSF), Vietnam (HTV2; DN1-RTV), South Korea (SBS), Japan (NTV), Canada (FTV), Hong Kong (ATV Home), Philippines (Q), Taiwan (TTV), Venezuela (Televen), United Kingdom (Netflix) and Indonesia (Hi Indo).
2009	Sebring		
2010	Young Bruce Lee: The Birth of a Legend		
2010	Bruce Lee, My Brother		
2012	I Am Bruce Lee		It won Leo Awards in 2012.
2013	No Way as Way		
2013	Fighter of Death		
2015	Ip Man 3		
2016	Birth of the Dragon		During the premiere of the film, director George Nolfi and star Philip Ng presented a commemorative plaque to the Chinese Hospital in San Francisco, where Bruce Lee was born. / The film won the Golden Angel Award at the 12th Chinese American Film Festival.
2019	Warrior		
2019	Iron Fists and Kung Fu Kicks		
2019	Once Upon a Time in Hollywood		
2019	Ip Man 4: The Finale		
2020	Be Water		Part of ESPN Films' 30 for 30. It won the Gold List Award in 2021.
2022	Bruce Lee: The Way of the Warrior		
2023	The Final Game of Death		Also on Blu-ray.

Note: all the documentaries listed here were produced after Lee's death; therefore, all the Lee footage is composed of archive footage and some never-before-seen footage.

== Video games ==
Year	Video game title	Role	Notes
1984	Bruce Lee	Himself	
1984	Kung-Fu Master	Thomas	Originally based on Game of Death
1985	Yie Ar Kung-Fu	Oolong (Lee in MSX version)	
1987	China Warrior	Wang	Mobile phones and PS2
1989	Bruce Lee Lives	Himself	
1993	Super Street Fighter II	Fei Long	Inspired by Enter the Dragon
1993	Dragon: The Bruce Lee Story	Himself	
2002	Bruce Lee: Quest of the Dragon	Himself	
2003	Bruce Lee: Return of the Legend	Himself/Hai Feng	
2008	Ultimate Bruce Lee	Himself	
2010	Bruce Lee: Dragon Warrior	Himself	Smartphone game Limited release
2011	Kung Fu Warrior	Himself	Smartphone game
2013	Broforce	Bro Lee	
2014	EA Sports UFC	Himself	PS4 and Xbox One game
2014	Bruce Lee: Enter The Game	Himself	Smartphone game
2016	EA Sports UFC 2 — Bruce Lee Bundle	Himself	PS4 and Xbox One game
2018	Bruce Lee Dragon Run	Himself	Smartphone game
2018	EA Sports UFC 3 — Bruce Lee Bundle	Himself	PS4 and Xbox One game
2019	Kung-fu Bruce: The Legend Continues	Himself	Smartphone game
Circa 2020	I Am Fighter	Lee	Smartphone game
Circa 2020	Kung Fu Attack: Final Fight	Lee	Smartphone game
Circa 2020	King of KungFu	Lee	Smartphone game
2020	EA Sports UFC 4 — Bruce Lee Bundle	Himself	PS4 and Xbox One game
2020	Street Kungfu: King Fighter	Lee	Smartphone game
2021	Superhero Captain X vs Kungfu Lee	Lee	Smartphone game
2022	KungFu Superstar: Call Me Sifu	Himself	Smartphone game
2022	KungFu Fighting Warrior	Himself	Smartphone game

Note 1: In Super Mario RPG, when Mario is about to fight a boss, his comrade Mallow stops him and says "Who do you think you are? Bruce Lee? You can't go in there with your fists flying!"

Note 2: Check Kim Dragon in World Heroes (1992), World Heroes 2 (1993), World Heroes Jet (1994) and World Heroes Perfect (1995).

Note 3: Check Marshall Law in Tekken (1994), Tekken 2 (1995), Tekken 3 (1996), Tekken 4 (2002), Tekken 5 (2005), Tekken 6 (2007) and Tekken 7 (2016) as well as Forest Law in Tekken Tag Tournament (1999), Marshall Law and Forest Law in Tekken Tag Tournament 2 (2011).

== Music video appearances ==
1975	Robert Lee	Bruce Lee's brother released an album entitled The Ballad of Bruce Lee.
2001	LMF	Hip-hop band from Hong Kong released a song with videoclip called "1127".

== Brucexploitation films ==
- The Pig Boss (1972)
- Shadow of the Dragon (1973)
- The Game of Death! (1974)
- The Black Dragon vs Yellow Tiger (1974)
- Bruce Lee: A Dragon Story (1974)
- Bruce Lee, D-Day at Macao (1975)
- Goodbye Bruce Lee: His Last Game of Death (1975)
- Bruce Lee Against Supermen (1975)
- The Story of Chinese Gods (1976)
- Exit the Dragon, Enter the Tiger (1976)
- Enter the Panther (1976)
- Bruce Lee Fights Back from the Grave (1976)
- New Fist of Fury (1976)
- The Dragon Lives (1976)
- Bruce Lee: The Man, The Myth (1976)
- Bruce's Deadly Fingers (1976)
- The Big Boss Part II (1976)
- Bruce Lee and I (1976)
- The Last Fist of Fury (1977)
- Bruce and Shaolin Kung Fu (1977)
- Bruce and the Shaolin Bronzemen (1977)
- Bruce Lee's Ways of Kung Fu (1977)
- Return of Bruce (1977)
- The Dragon Lives Again (1977)
- Bruce Lee the Invincible (1977)
- Bruce Lee, We Miss You (1977)
- Fist of Fury II (1977)
- Bruce Li in New Guinea (1977)
- Deadly Strike (1978)
- Bruce Li's Magnum Fist (1978)
- Bruce Lee vs. the Iron Dragon (1978)
- Return of the Tiger (1978)
- The Image of Bruce Lee (1978)
- Fists of Bruce Lee (1978)
- Enter the Game of Death (1978)
- Enter Three Dragons (1978)
- Enter the Fat Dragon (1978)
- Return of the Fist of Fury (1978)
- Soul Brothers of Kung Fu (1978)
- Edge of Fury (1978)
- My Name Called Bruce (1978)
- Way of the Dragon 2 (1978)
- Bruce and Shaolin Kung Fu 2 (1978)
- Bruce the Super Hero (1979)
- Bruce Lee's Secret (1979)
- Re-Enter the Dragon (1979)
- Fist of Fury III (1979)
- They Call Him Bruce Lee (1979)
- Kungfu Fever (1979)
- The True Game of Death (1979)
- Bruce Against Iron Hand (1979)
- The Iron Dragon Strikes Back (1979)
- Blind Fist of Bruce (1979)
- Fist of Fear, Touch of Death (1980)
- Bruce's Fist of Vengeance (1980)
- The Clones of Bruce Lee (1980)
- Treasure of Bruce Le (1980)
- Bruce, King of Kung Fu (1980)
- Challenge of the Tiger (1980)
- Enter Another Dragon (1981)
- Bruce vs. Bill (1981)
- Bruce and the Dragon Fist (1981)
- Force: Five (1981)
- Game of Death II (1981)
- They Call Me Bruce? (1982)
- Ninja Strikes Back (1982)
- Bruce Le vs. Ninja (1982)
- Jackie and Bruce to the Rescue (1982)
- Cameroon Connection (1984)
- The Last Dragon (1985)
- No Retreat, No Surrender (1986)
- Return of the Kickfighter (1987)
- Ninja Over the Great Wall (1987)
- Bruce's Secret Kung Fu (1988)
- Fist of Legend (1994)
- Fist of Fury 4 (1998)
- Shaolin Soccer (2001)
- Big Boss Untouchable (2002)
- Dragon in Fury (2004)
- Hero the Great (2005)
- Finishing the Game (2007)
- Legend of the Fist: The Return of Chen Zhen (2010)
- Enter the Fat Dragon (2020)
- Batman: Soul of the Dragon (2021)
- Enter the Clones of Bruce (2023)

== See also ==
- Bruceploitation
- Bruce Lee Library
- Bruce Lee (comics)
- List of awards and honors received by Bruce Lee
- Jeet Kune Do
