= List of Hong Kong films of 1976 =

A list of films produced in Hong Kong in 1976:

== A–M ==
Title	Director	Cast	Genre	Notes
1976
7-Man Army	Chang Cheh			
18 Bronzemen	Joseph Kuo	Han Chiang	Martial arts	
72 Desperate Rebels	Ting Shan-hsi			
800 Heroes	Lin Bing			
Autumn Love Song	Pai Ching Jui			
Beautiful Vixen	Ng Wui			
The Beauty With Two Faces				
The Best Friends				
The Best Of Shaolin Kung Fu	Chan Siu Pang, Chang Yan Tao			
Big Bad Sis	Sun Chung			
Big Boss 2				
Big Family	Steve Chan Ho			
Big Times for the Crazy Bumpkins	John Law Ma			
Black Dragon River				
Black Magic, Part II	Ho Meng Hua			
Blazing Temple	Joseph Kuo			
A Bloody Hero	Chik Yiu Cheong			
Born Rich	Patrick Tse Yin			
Boxer Rebellion	Chang Cheh			
Brotherhood	Hua Shan			
Bruce Lee: The Man, The Myth			Bruceploitation	
Bruce Lee - True Story	Ng See Yuen			
Bruce Lee and I	John Law Ma			
Bruce Lee Fights Back from the Grave	Lee Doo-yong			
Bruce Lee, The Legend	Leonard Ho Koon Cheung			
Bruce Lee's Deadly Kung Fu	Chan Wa, William Cheung Kei			
Bruce's Deadly Fingers	Joseph Kong Hung			
Cannonball	Paul Bartel			
The Cantonese	Yeung Jing Chan			
Challenge of the Masters	Liu Chia-Liang			
The Chase Game				
Chelsia My Love	Sung Chuen Sau			
The Chess Board	Terry Tong Gei Ming			
China Armed Escort				
CID - first season	Ann Hui On Wah, Patrick Tam Kar Ming, Yim Ho			
Come Fly with Me				
The Condemned	David Chiang			
Crazy Bumpkin In Singapore	John Law			
Crazy Sex	Li Han Hsiang			
The Criminals	Ching Gong, Ho Meng Hua, Hua Shan			
Crossroad	Chin Han			
A Dead Rivalry	Tien Feng			
Deadly Kick	Ko Young Nam, Lo Lieh			
Deadly Roulette	Lo Lieh			
Different Love				
Divorce Hong Kong Style	Jeanette Lin Tsui			
The Double Crossers	Jeong Chang-hwa			
Dragon Force Operation	Tyrone Hsu Tin Wing			
The Dragon Lives	Wang Hsing-lei	Bruce Li, Caryn White, Betty Chen	Martial arts, biopic	a.k.a. He's a Legend, He's a Hero
The Dragon Missile	Ho Meng Hua			
Dragon Vs. Needles Of Death				
The Drug Connection	Sun Chung			
The Drug Queen	Richard Yeung Kuen			
Eight Strikes Of A Wild Cat	Lin Yi Hsiu			
Elmo Takes A Bride	Zhu Mu			
Emmanuelle in the Orient	Bitto Albertini			
Emperor Chien Lung	Wong Fung			
Erotic Nights	Law Chun			
Escort Girls	Steve Chan Ho			
The Eternal Obsession	Kenneth Tsang			
Exit the Dragon, Enter the Tiger	Lee Tso Nam			
Farewell To A Warrior	Chu Yuan			
The Fierce Fist				
The Forbidden Past	Chu Yuan			
Forever My Love	Pai Ching Jui			
Fury Of The Sun				
Game Of Love				
General Stone				
The Girlie Bar	John Law			
Girls For Sale	Lui Kei			
Gonna Get You	Hong Wai			
The Good, The Bad And The Loser	Karl Maka	Roy Chiao, Lau Kar-wing, Carter Wong, Karl Maka, Richard Ng	Martial arts	
Hand of Death	John Woo	Jackie Chan, Sammo Hung, Dorian Tan, James Tien	Kung fu	
Heroes Of The Underground	Pao Hsueh Lieh			
Heroine Kan Lien Chu	Hau Chang			
The Himalayan	Huang Feng			
Homicides - The Criminals, Part II	Hua Shan, Kuei Chih Hung, Sun Chung			
The Hot, The Cool And The Vicious	Lee Tso Nam			
THe Hunter, The Butterfly & The Crocodile	Richard Yeung Kuen			
Hustler From Canton	Wong Fung			
I Want More!	Chan Chi Hwa, Peter Yang Kwan			
Invincible Super Guy	Chui Chang Wang			
Jaws Of The Dragon	Nam Seok-hun			
Jumping Ash	Leong Po Chih, Josephine Siao Fong Fong			
Kidnap In Rome	Ng See Yuen			
The Killer 1				
Killer Clans	Chor Yuen			
Killer Meteors	Lo Wei	Jackie Chan, Jimmy Wang Yu	Action / Martial arts	
Killers On Wheels	Kuei Chih Hung			
King Gambler	Ching Gong	Chen Kuan-Tai, Chen Ping, Fan Mei-sheng, Gam Lau	Action	
Knife Of Devil's Roaring And Soul Missing	Lee Goon Cheung			
Lady Karate	Ting Shan-hsi			
The Last Tempest	Li Han Hsiang			
Laugh In	Patrick Lung Kong			
Learned Bride Thrice Fools Bridegroom	Richard Yeung Kuen			
Leaving Home	Eddie Fong Ling Ching			
The Legend of Bruce Lee	Lin Bing			
The Legend Of The Book And the Sword				
Let's Rock				
Lina	Patrick Lung Kong			
The Little Ancestors	Paul Chang Chung			
Love By Post	Cheung Mei Gwan			
Love Competition				
Love Cross-Road	Wong Wah Kai			
Love Forever				
Love in Hawaii	Patrick Tse Yin			
Love in the Twilight Zone	Ting Shan-hsi			
Love Is Like a Game				
Love of Strange Talk				
Love Swindlers	Li Han Hsiang			
Lu Hsiao Fury				
The Lucky Bumpkin	Zhang Yang			
The Magic Blade	Chor Yuen	Ti Lung, Lo Lieh, Ku Feng	Wuxia	
Master of the Flying Guillotine	Jimmy Wang	Jimmy Wang	Martial arts	a.k.a. One-Armed Boxer 2

== N–Z ==
Title	Director	Cast	Genre	Notes
New Fist of Fury	Lo Wei	Jackie Chan, Nora Miao	Kung fu	
Princess Chang Ping (aka Dai Nui Fa)	John Woo Yu-Sum	Lung Kim-Sang, Mui Suet-Sze, Liang Tsi-Pak, Leung Sing-Po, Kong Suet-Liu, Jue Kim-Daan, Chu Siu-Boh, Lee Fung, Yin Suet-Fan, Leung Kar-Bo	Cantonese opera	
The Private Eyes	Michael Hui	Michael Hui, Samuel Hui, Ricky Hui, Angie Chiu, Richard Ng Yiu-Hon, Lo Wai-Chi, Lily Leung, Lai Siu-Fong, Chan Lap-Ban, Yu Miu-Lin, Gam Lau	Comedy	
Shaolin Traitorous	Sung Ting Mei	Sammo Hung, Polly Kuan, Carter Wong	Martial arts	Taiwanese-Japanese co-production
Shaolin Wooden Men	Chen Chi Hwa	Jackie Chan, Chiang Kam, Yuen Biao, Hwang Jang Lee	Kung fu / Action / Drama	
