= Anne Winton =

American ballerina, martial artist and actress

- Born: July 3, 1949; Brewster County, Texas, United States
- Died: October 18, 1982 (aged 33); Alexandria, Virginia, United States
- Other names: Anne Tyler Winton; Ann Winston, Ann Winter; 安蕙丹
- Education: University of Michigan
- Years active: 1970s
- Spouse: Marcos Kusanovic
- Children: 1 (son)

Anne Winton (July 3, 1949 – October 18, 1982) was an American ballerina, martial artist and film actress. Hailing from Brewster County, Texas, she starred in two films during the 1970s. Her first film was When Taekwondo Strikes (1973), which she co-starred in. She was the first Caucasian female martial artist to star in an Asian film production. Her second film was Bruce Lee: A Dragon Story (1974), opposite Bruce Li. She was murdered in 1982.

== Background ==
Anne Winton was born to Mr. and Mrs. Tyler Winton. Her father was a Lieutenant Colonel in the Air Force Reserve and a US border patrol assistant chief inspector. By 1965, 16 year old Anne and her family had been living in Spokane for five years. During that time, two of those years saw her winning five first place medals from the Greater Spokane Music & Allied Arts Festival. She had studied ballet under Themla Young. She was offered three scholarships, one of which was at the Banff School of Fine Arts. After studying ballet at the University of Michigan, she came to Washington. Winton was a student of Jhoon Rhee, and held a black belt in Taekwondo. She made history of sorts with her role in When Taekwondo Strikes which made her the first Caucasian female martial artist to appear in a Hong Kong martial arts film.

== Acting ==
She co-starred in the Golden Harvest production, When Taekwondo Strikes which starred Jhoon Rhee. This was the first time in a film for the 23 year old Winton. It was suggested by Lowell Sun and the Edmonton Journal that there were some other new approaches employed by Golden Harvest to pitch to an international audience. This included a blonde American girl (Winton). In the film, she played the part of Mary who was the niece of the Catholic priest Father Louis. In one of her scenes in the film, she fights the character played by Sammo Hung. She bites him in the leg and takes a chunk out. According to reviewer World Film Geek held her own quite well in the role. Far East Films in its review said she was surprisingly both powerful in fighting ability and acting.

Winton had become friendly with Bruce Lee (who came up with the idea for the film) during the filming of When Taekwondo Strikes and she used some of the money she made from the film to attend his funeral.

She did appear in one other film, Bruce Lee: A Dragon Story (1974) which starred Bruce Li.

== Martial arts ==
Winton wrote a letter to Black Belt which was published in its April, 1974 issue. In it she voiced her displeasure at the poor coverage of female martial artists. Having studied Taekwondo under Jhoon Rhee and getting her black belt, she did take an interest in another martial art. In later years she was studying Aikido.

== Death ==
Winton met an untimely end in October 1982 at a friend's apartment in Alexandria, Virginia. Her husband Marcos Kusanovic who was the father of their five year old son stabbed her and their son to death before killing himself. Winton was a student at George Washington University. A woman who was a tenant at the garden apartments known as the Hamlets was also a student at the university where Winton attended. She also knew Winton. She came running out of the building around 5.30 pm and alerted an upstairs neighbor who was watching television. Their bodies were found by police officer Arthur Miller who was investigating a burglary in the area. At first it was thought that the deaths were a triple homicide but according to investigator, James Scutt, further investigation revealed that Kusanovic had killed his wife and son before stabbing himself.

== Filmography ==
Film roles as actor
Title	Role	Director	Year	Notes #
When Taekwondo Strikes	Mary	Feng Huang	1973	
Bruce Lee: A Dragon Story		Shut Dik	1974	
