= Bruceploitation =

Exploitation film subgenre focused on Bruce Lee

- Super Dragon: The Bruce Lee Story (1974, starring Bruce Li) is often credited as being the first entry in Bruceploitation.
- Years active: 1974–1982
- Location: China, Japan, South Korea, United States
- Major figures: Bruce Li; Bruce Le; Dragon Lee
- Influences: Exploitation film; martial arts film
- Influenced: Jackie Chan; Stephen Chow; Sammo Hung; Quentin Tarantino

Bruceploitation (a portmanteau of "Bruce Lee" and "exploitation") is an exploitation film subgenre that emerged after the death of martial arts film star Bruce Lee in 1973, during which time filmmakers from Hong Kong, Taiwan and South Korea cast Bruce Lee look-alike actors ("Lee-alikes") to star in imitation martial arts films, in order to exploit Lee's sudden international popularity. Bruce Lee look-alike characters also commonly appear in other media, including anime, comic books, manga, and video games.

== History ==
When martial arts film star Bruce Lee died on July 20, 1973, he was Hong Kong's most famous martial arts actor, known for his roles in six feature-length Hong Kong martial arts films in the early 1970s: Lo Wei's The Big Boss (1971) and Fist of Fury (1972); Golden Harvest's The Way of the Dragon (1972) and the incomplete film Game of Death (1972), both directed and written by Lee; and Golden Harvest / Warner Brothers' Enter the Dragon (1973) and Game of Death: The Clouse Cut (1978), both films directed by Robert Clouse.

When Enter the Dragon became a box office success worldwide, many Hong Kong studios feared that a movie without their most famous star in it would not be financially successful and decided to play on Lee's sudden international fame by making movies that sounded like Bruce Lee starring vehicles. They cast actors who looked like Lee and changed their screen names to variations of Lee's name, such as Bruce Li and Bruce Le.

== Actors ==
After Bruce Lee's death, many actors assumed Lee-like stage names. Bruce Li (黎(Lí)小龍 from his real name Ho Chung Tao 何宗道), Bruce Chen, Bruce Lai (real name Chang Yi-Tao), Bruce Le (呂(Lǚ)小龍 from his real name Wong Kin Lung, 黃建龍), Bruce Lie, Bruce Leung, Saro Lee, Bruce Ly, Bruce Thai, Brute Lee, Myron Bruce Lee, Lee Bruce, and Bruce Lei / Dragon Lee (real name Moon Kyoung-seok) were hired by studios to play Lee-styled roles. Bruce Li appeared in Bruce Lee Against Supermen, in which he stars as Kato, assistant of the Green Hornet, a role originally played by the real Bruce Lee.

Dragon Lee, a Korean who also used the name Bruce Lei, was another in this genre.

Additionally, when some Japanese karate and Korean taekwondo films were dubbed into English for U.S. release, the protagonists were given new Lee-like stage names. Such was the case with Jun Chong (credited as Bruce K. L. Lea in the altered and English-dubbed Bruce Lee Fights Back from the Grave) and Tadashi Yamashita (credited as Bronson Lee in the altered English-dubbed Bronson Lee, Champion).

Jackie Chan, who started his movie career as an extra and stunt artist in some of Bruce Lee's movies, was also given roles where he was promoted as the next Bruce Lee as Chan Yuen Lung (with Yuen Lung's stage name borrowed from his fellow Fortunes actor Sammo Hung), such as New Fist of Fury (1976). Only when he made some comedy-themed movies for another studio was he able to attain box-office success.

In 2001, actor Danny Chan Kwok-kwan sported Lee's look in the Cantonese comedy film Shaolin Soccer. The role led to him to play Lee in the biographical television series The Legend of Bruce Lee, as well as in the films Ip Man 3 and Ip Man 4.

== Film and television ==
Some of the films, such as Re-Enter the Dragon, Enter Three Dragons, Return of Bruce, Enter Another Dragon, Return of the Fists of Fury, or Enter the Game of Death, were rehashes of Bruce Lee's classics. Others told Lee's life story and explored his mysteries, such as Bruce Lee's Secret (a farcical rehash starring Bruce-clone Bruce Li in San Francisco defending Chinese immigrants from thugs), Exit the Dragon, Enter the Tiger (where Bruce Li is asked by Bruce Lee to replace him after his death), and Bruce's Fist of Vengeance.

Other films used his death as a plot element such as The Clones of Bruce Lee (where clones of Bruce Lee portrayed by some of the above actors are created by scientists) or The Dragon Lives Again (where Bruce Lee fights fictional characters such as James Bond and Dracula in Hell and finds allies amongst others such as Popeye and Kwai Chang Caine). Others, such as Bruce Lee Fights Back from the Grave, featured Lee imitators but with a plot having nothing to do with Bruce Lee.

One of Lee's fight choreographers, actor-director Sammo Hung, famously satirised the phenomenon of Bruceploitation in his 1978 film, Enter the Fat Dragon. Elliott Hong's They Call Me Bruce? satirised the tendency for all male Asian actors (and by extension, male Asians in general) to have to sell themselves as Bruce Lee-types to succeed.

One notable film is Fist of Fear, Touch of Death released in 1980. While the real Lee does appear in the movie, it is only through dubbed stock footage. The movie passes itself off as non-fiction but is fictional. The plot involves a martial arts tournament where the prize is recognition as Lee's successor. This is intertwined with what the movie passes off as the life story of Bruce Lee. The film says that Lee's parents did not want him be a martial artist, and he ran away from home to become an actor. In real life, they encouraged his careers. The film conflates China and Japan by stating Lee's martial art was Karate (a Japanese art) instead of Kung Fu (a Chinese art) and that his great-grandfather was a samurai (impossible as samurai are found in Japan, not China).

=== Partial list of films ===
- The Pig Boss (Philippines, 1972), starring Ramon Zamora
- Shadow of the Dragon (Philippines, 1973), starring Ramon Zamora
- Ring of Fury (Singapore, 1973), starring Peter Chong
- The Game of Death! (Philippines, 1974), starring Ramon Zamora
- Bruce Lee: A Dragon Story (Hong Kong, 1974), starring Bruce Li
- Goodbye Bruce Lee: His Last Game of Death (Taiwan, 1975), starring Bruce Li
- Exit the Dragon, Enter the Tiger (Taiwan/Hong Kong, 1976), starring Bruce Li
- Bruce Lee Fights Back from the Grave (South Korea, 1976), starring Jun Chong
- New Fist of Fury (Hong Kong, 1976), a sequel to Fist of Fury starring Jackie Chan
- The Dragon Lives (Taiwan/Hong Kong, 1976), starring Bruce Li
- Bruce Lee: The Man, The Myth (Hong Kong, 1976), starring Bruce Li
- The Dragon Lives Again (Hong Kong, 1977), starring Bruce Leung
- Fist of Fury II (Hong Kong, 1977), a sequel to Fist of Fury starring Bruce Li; unrelated to New Fist of Fury
- Return of the Tiger (Hong Kong, 1978), starring Bruce Li
- The Image of Bruce Lee (Hong Kong, 1978), starring Bruce Li
- Fists of Bruce Lee (Hong Kong, 1978), starring Bruce Li
- They Call Her Cleopatra Wong (Philippines, 1978), starring Marrie Lee
- Enter the Game of Death (South Korea/Hong Kong, 1978), starring Bruce Le
- Fist of Fury III (Hong Kong, 1979), starring Bruce Li
- They Call Him Bruce Lee (Philippines, 1979), starring Jack Lee and Rey Malonzo
- Kungfu Fever (South Korea/Taiwan, 1979), starring Dragon Lee
- Fist of Fear, Touch of Death (United States, 1980), starring Bruce Lee (archival footage) and Fred Williamson
- The Clones of Bruce Lee (South Korea/Hong Kong, 1980), starring Bruce Le, Dragon Lee, Bruce Lai, and Bruce Thai
- Bruce's Fist of Vengeance (Philippines, 1980), starring Bruce Le
- Katilon Ke Kaatil (India, 1981), Hindi film featuring Bruce Le in several scenes
- Jackie and Bruce to the Rescue (Hong Kong, 1982), starring Tong Lung
- No Retreat, No Surrender (U.S.A., 1985), starring Jean-Claude Van Damme, Kurt McKinney and Kim Tai-chung as the ghost of Bruce Lee.

=== Bruce Lee's double (lookalike) ===
- Game of Death (1978)
- Game of Death II (1981)

=== End of a trend ===
Bruceploitation ended when Jackie Chan made a name for himself with the success of the kung fu comedies Snake in the Eagle's Shadow and Drunken Master. These films established him as the "new king" of Hong Kong martial arts cinema. Another factor in the end of Bruceploitation was the beginning of the Shaw Brothers film era in the late 1970s, which started with movies such as Five Deadly Venoms which featured new martial arts stars in the Venom Mob. Since the end of the trend, Bruce Lee's influence on Hong Kong action cinema remained strong, but the actors began establishing their own personalities, and the films began to take on a more comedic approach.

=== Documentary ===
In 2017, production began on the documentary Enter the Clones of Bruce (2023). The documentary interviews many of the key players of the Bruceploitation movement, including Ho Chung-tao (Bruce Li), Huang Jianlong (Bruce Le), Ryong Keo (Dragon Lee), and Leung Choi-sang (Bruce Liang). The film had its world premiere at the 2023 Tribeca Film Festival.

=== Rebirth ===
Bruceploitation has continued in the United States in a muted form since the 1970s. Films such as Force: Five, No Retreat, No Surrender, and The Last Dragon used Bruce Lee as a marketing hook, and the genre continues to be a source of exploration for fans of the late Little Dragon and his doppelgangers. Fist of Fear, Touch of Death told a fictional life story of the star.

In May 2010, Carl Jones published the book Here Come the Kung Fu Clones. It focuses on a particular Lee-a-like, Ho Chung Tao, but it also explores the best and worst actors and films that the genre has to offer.

The first Spanish book on the genre by Ivan E. Fernandez Fojón, Bruceploitation. Los clones de Bruce Lee was published by Applehead Team Creaciones in November 2017.

In 1994, the film The Green Hornet was released in Hong Kong, directed by Lam Ching-ying (friend and action choreographer of Bruce Lee) and starring Chin Ka-lok, in the plot, Dong (Chin Ka-lok) is the current Green Hornet (a composite character between Green Hornet and Kato), following a millennial legacy, a predecessor of Dong looks like Kato (Bruce Lee).

Black Mask is a 1996 Hong Kong action film starring Jet Li. Based on the 1992 manhua of the same name created by Li Chi-Tak, the film features a hero who wears a domino mask and a chauffeur's cap, in homage to the Kato. In 2002, the sequel Black Mask 2: City of Masks was released, this time starring Andy On in the title role.

In the film Legend of the Fist: The Return of Chen Zhen (2010), Donnie Yen plays Chen Zhen, a character played by Bruce Lee in the classic Fist of Fury (1972). Chen Zhen adopts a masked identity inspired by Kato to fight against the Japanese occupation and protect the population.

Stewart Home’s book Re-Enter The Dragon: Genre Theory, Brucesploitation & the Sleazy Joys of Lowbrow Cinema (Ledatape Organisation, Melbourne 2018) "is cleaning up the territory and sharpening the contours of the category of Bruceploitation which as he sees it has not been worked out rigorously enough by early pioneers." This book appeared after Home made and exhibited an art film meditation on the subject of Bruceploitation for Glasgow International in 2016.

The Legend of Bruce Lee (2008), a Chinese television drama series based on the life of Bruce Lee, has been watched by over 400 million viewers in China through CCTV, making it the most-watched Chinese television drama series of all time, as of 2017. It has also been aired in other parts of the world.

== Comics and animation ==
The comic book medium also gave birth to several characters inspired by Bruce Lee, most notably in Japanese comics or manga.

Bruce Lee had an influence on several American comic book writers, notably Marvel Comics founder Stan Lee, who considered Bruce Lee to be a superhero without a costume. Shortly after his death, Lee inspired the Marvel character Iron Fist (debuted 1974) and the comic book series The Deadly Hands of Kung Fu (debuted 1974). According to Stan Lee, any character that is a martial artist since then owes their origin to Bruce Lee in some form. Paul Gulacy was inspired by Bruce Lee when he drew the Marvel character Shang-Chi.

=== Manga and anime ===
In Tetsuo Hara and Buronson’s influential shōnen manga and anime series Fist of the North Star, the main character Kenshiro was deliberately created by them based on Bruce Lee, combined with influences from Mad Max. Kenshiro’s appearance resembles that of Lee, as well as mannerisms inspired by Lee, such as his fighting style and battle cries. Additionally, in Hokuto no Ken’s prequel Fist of the Blue Sky, the main character is Kenshiro’s uncle, named Kenshiro Kasumi, who is also modelled after Lee’s physique and mannerisms in the same way as his nephew.

Akira Toriyama's influential shonen manga and anime series Dragon Ball was also inspired by Bruce Lee films, such as Enter the Dragon (1973). The title Dragon Ball was inspired by Enter the Dragon as well as later Bruceploitation knockoff kung fu movies which frequently had the word "Dragon" in the title. Later, when Toriyama created the Super Saiyan transformation during the Freeza arc, he gave Goku piercing eyes based on Bruce Lee's paralysing glare.

In Masashi Kishimoto’s Naruto manga, the characters Might Guy and Rock Lee were modelled by him after Bruce Lee.

== Video games ==
Bruce Lee films such as Game of Death and Enter the Dragon were the foundation for video game genres such as beat 'em up action games and fighting games. Kung-Fu Master (1984), considered the first beat 'em up game, is based on Lee's Game of Death, with the five-level Devil's Temple reflecting the movie's setting of a five-level pagoda with a martial arts master in each level. Kung-Fu Master in turn served as the prototype for most subsequent martial arts action games in the late 1980s. Datasoft Inc. also released the game Bruce Lee in 1984.

The fighting game Yie Ar Kung-Fu (1985) was also inspired by Bruce Lee films, with the main player character Oolong modelled after Lee (like Bruceploitation films). In turn, Yie Ar Kung-Fu established the template for subsequent fighting games. The Street Fighter video game franchise (1987 debut) was inspired by Enter the Dragon, with the gameplay centered around an international fighting tournament, and each character having a unique combination of ethnicity, nationality and fighting style; Street Fighter went on to set the template for all fighting games that followed.

Since then, numerous fighting games have featured Bruce Lee look-alike characters, starting with World Heroes which introduced Kim Dragon in 1992. Super Street Fighter II character Fei Long was designed as a homage to Bruce Lee as well. The character Liu Kang in the Mortal Kombat franchise was also modelled after Bruce Lee. The Tekken franchise followed suit with Marshall Law, and just once had him substituted by introducing his son Forest Law. EA Sports UFC includes Bruce Lee as an unlockable character, though it came with the approval of his daughter Shannon.

Another notable game that features Bruce Lee is The Dragon, released in 1995 by Ramar International (also called Rinco) and Tony Tech in Taiwan. The game is for the Famicom (better known as the Nintendo Entertainment System (NES) in the west) but is not licensed by Nintendo or the Bruce Lee estate. The game's plot is loosely based on the plots of Lee's films and most levels are given titles from them. The game mixes fighting parts with platforming parts and is also noted for stealing graphics from Mortal Kombat (including using Liu Kang to represent Lee), being one of the few Famicom/NES games to have two languages (English and Arabic) available in game and one of the few in Arabic at all. The game's official Arabic title as shown on the title screen is التنين ("Al-Tinneen") and the box also gives the game the Chinese title of 李小龍 ("Lǐ Xiǎolóng", Bruce Lee's name in Chinese) and the alternate title of Lee Dragon.

Many other video games have characters based on Lee, although he is rarely credited. Video game characters synonymous with Lee are usually spotted by fighting techniques and signature "jumping stance", physical appearances, clothing, and iconic battle cries and yells similar to those of Lee. Examples include fighting game characters such as Maxi in the Soulcalibur series and Jann Lee in the Dead or Alive series.

== Advertising and merchandise ==
Though Bruce Lee did not appear in commercials during his lifetime, his likeness and image has since appeared in hundreds of commercials around the world.

Nokia launched an Internet-based campaign in 2008 with staged "documentary-looking" footage of Bruce Lee playing ping-pong with his nunchaku and also igniting matches as they are thrown toward him. The videos went viral on YouTube, creating confusion as some people believed them to be authentic footage.

The clothing apparel company Bow & Arrow released the "Gung Fu Scratch" t-shirt, featuring an image of Bruce Lee photoshopped to make it look like he is DJing. The t-shirt has been worn by celebrities such as Justin Bieber, Will Smith, Nas, Snoop Dogg and Ne-Yo. The image became more popular following its appearance in the Marvel Cinematic Universe superhero film Avengers: Age of Ultron (2015), in which Tony Stark (Robert Downey Jr.) wears it. Sales of the t-shirt increased substantially following the film's release.

== See also ==
- Media about Bruce Lee
- Bruce Lee (comics)
- Bruce Lee filmography
- Bruce Lee Library
- List of awards and honors received by Bruce Lee
- Jeet Kune Do
