= The Chinese Stuntman =

1981 Hong Kong film by Bruce Li

- Directed by: Bruce Li
- Written by: Bruce Li
- Starring: Bruce Li; Yun-wen Chang; Ting Chao; Tao Chiang; Dan Inosanto
- Release date: 1981
- Country: Hong Kong

The Chinese Stuntman (also known as Counter Attack or The Chieh Boxing Master) is a 1981 Hong Kong martial arts action film starring Bruce Li as a stunt double for kung fu films who unravels the corruption of the Hong Kong film industry. The film is considered to be part of the wave of films released in the aftermath of Bruce Lee's death, labeled Bruceploitation, as well as a postmodernist film.

== Plot ==
An insurance clerk is hired as a stunt double. He soon becomes a movie star, but finds that the corruption of Hong Kong's film industry runs deeper the higher his stardom rises.

== Cast ==
- Bruce Li
- Dan Inosanto

== Style ==
Den of Geek writer Craig Lines has interpreted The Chinese Stuntman as a postmodernist film, noting the numerous references to Bruce Lee films, and the use of a film-within-a-film narrative. He also said that the film presents the idea that "Lee fades into the background" as Bruce Li "reaches the foreground" as an actor and director.

== Reception ==
Den of Geek writer Craig Lines said that "The Chinese Stuntman is, without any competition, Li's masterpiece. It's got a strong plot with actual twists and characters you care about. [...] It's witty, perceptive and cleverly executed."
