= Fist of Fury II =

1977 Hong Kong film by Lahardi Iksan and Lee Tso-nam

- Theatrical release poster
- Directed by: Lahardi Iksan; Lee Tso-nam
- Written by: Chang Hsin-yi
- Produced by: Jimmy Shaw
- Starring: Bruce Li; Lo Lieh; Chan Wai-lau; Ti Fung
- Cinematography: Yeh Ching-piao
- Edited by: Leong Wing-chan
- Music by: Chow Fu-liang
- Distributed by: Hong Kong Alpha Motion Picture Co.
- Release dates: 13 September 1977 (West Germany); 5 April 1979 (Hong Kong)
- Running time: 104 minutes
- Country: Hong Kong
- Language: Cantonese

Fist of Fury II (Chinese: 精武門續集) (also fully titled as Fist of Fury Part II: Fistful of the Dragon) is a 1977 Hong Kong exploitation kung fu film directed by Lahardi Iksan and Lee Tso-nam. The film stars Bruce Li and Lo Lieh. It is the sequel to Bruce Lee’s Fist of Fury (1972), where the lead role of Chen Shan, played by Bruce Li, who goes to Shanghai to mourn his brother's death who was killed at the hands of the Japanese. Chen Shan then avenges his brother by killing the Japanese.

== Plot ==
After Chen Zhen's execution in Shanghai, the Japanese feared that his death would unite all Chinese kung fu schools against them. Fearing this, the Japanese gave orders to the head of the Hong Ku School, Miyamoto (Lo Lieh) to suppress all the Chinese schools including the Ching Wu School. Miyamoto sends the Japanese along with their interpreter to the Ching Wu School ordering the leader & students to leave the School. When they refuse, the Japanese beat up the students and destroy the school. Meanwhile, one Chinese man learns about the destruction of the Ching Wu School when he goes to Shanghai to visit Chen Zhen's grave. This Chinese man is the only one who has the guts to fight the Japanese. He is known as Chen Shan (Bruce Li) who is the brother of Chen Zhen and he vows to avenge his brother's death and end the terror of the Japanese once and for all.

== Cast ==
- Bruce Li as Chen Shan
- Lo Lieh as Miyamoto
- Chen Hui-lou as Wang Bar
- Tien Feng as Tin Man Kwai
- Li Kun as Lee Shun
- Yasuyoshi Shikamura as Yanagi Saburo
- James Nam as Souto Jyo
- Chao Kin as Inspector Chiu
- Shin Nam as Policeman #1
- Shiu Yu as Policeman #2
- Mui-shao Sui as Sister
- Kam To as Kam Fuk
- Lee Kin-ming as Cheung S’mg Hung
- Ching Cheng-hai as Shun Chui
- Shun-chiu Bo as Ching Wu's Brother #1
- Fa-yuan Lee as Ching Wu's Brother #2
- Chiang Lee as Ching Wu's Brother #3
- Ze-tin Ku as Japanese Knight #1
- You-pin Liu as Japanese Knight #2
- Hau-bao Wai as Japanese Knight #3
- Chiu-hong Seng as Japanese Knight #4
- Tai-kin Yin as Japanese Knight #5
- Chan-sum Lam as Japanese Knight #6
- Wai-hung Ho as Japanese Knight #7
- To Wai-wo

== Reception ==
The final fight between Chen Shan and Miyamoto, played by Lo Lieh, is generally thought of as disappointing compared to other fights in the film, as it is slow and long. This film is generally regarded as one of Bruce Li's better films. It was not as well received as its predecessor, but was thought to be much better than Lo Wei’s New Fist of Fury.

In 2001, Bruce Lee fanzine Exit the Dragon, Enter the Tiger, Carl Jones spoke favourably of this film: "Li's martial skills are in top form here and his fights are well choreographed by veteran Tommy Lee. The final duel with Miyamoto is well staged and takes place at the Ching Wu school All in all a worthy sequel to a great Kung Fu classic."

Also admiring is Dean Medows, who wrote in his three-part Bruceploitation essay in Impact Magazine: "Fist of Fury 2 is a movie that is still regarded as one of the very finest examples of Bruce Lee exploitation cinema. With martial arts skills constantly improving, including his earlier limited nunchaku use, Li was now firmly established as the pioneer of Bruceploitation."

== Sequel ==
Another sequel was released in 1979, titled Fist of Fury III: Jeet Kune the Claws and the Supreme Kung Fu.

== See also ==
- List of Hong Kong films of 1976
- Lo Lieh filmography
