= Tears of Buddha =

- Directed by: Elliott Hong
- Produced by: H.S. Park
- Cinematography: Russ Kingston
- Distributed by: Pacific Studio
- Release date: 1973
- Running time: 50 minutes
- Countries: United States; South Korea
- Language: English

Tears of Buddha is a 1973 documentary film directed by Elliott Hong and filmed by cinematographer Russ Kingston.

== Overview ==
An exploration of folk art festivals, competitive games, religious ceremonies, farms, villages and ancient shrines of South Korea in the fall of 1972.

== See also ==
- List of American films of 1973
