= The True Game of Death =

1979 Hong Kong film by Steve Harries and Chen Tien-tai

The True Game of Death 決鬥死亡塔
- DVD Cover
- Directed by: Steve Harries; Chen Tien-tai
- Produced by: Wai Cheung-tien
- Starring: Hsao Lung; Alice Meyer; George Steve
- Cinematography: Sing Lai-man
- Production company: Ho Hsin Motion Picture Company
- Release date: 3 December 1979 (Denmark)
- Running time: 81 minutes
- Language: Mandarin

The True Game of Death is a low budget 1979 Bruceploitation film, starring Hsao Lung. The film borrows heavily from Golden Harvest's 1978 Game of Death.

== Plot ==
The film begins with footage of Bruce Lee's funeral. The narrator then says that there is a new actor "who looks quite like him" that will become Lee's successor. He is introduced in a training montage. His name is Hsao Lung. Later Hsao Lung is filming a movie. On the set, he is approached by a group of gangsters, led by a man named George, who want to control Hsao Lung. Hsao Lung declines, so they go after his girlfriend Alice, forcing her poison Hsao. During sex, the poison takes action and Hsao supposedly dies. Hsao fakes his death and pretends to be a chef so that he can watch over Alice. Alice finds that Hsao faked his death and becomes angry and leaves him.

When she leaves, the gangsters capture her. Hsao starts looking for her and goes to a shipyard. There he fights off 4 motorcycle riding gangsters that are wearing multi colored jump suits. He defeats them and goes to the tower of death. He defeats the fighter on the first floor using nun chucks. On the second floor he defeats two sumo wrestlers. On the third floor he defeats a boxer. He then rescues Alice and George is arrested

== Cast ==
- Lung Tien-hsiang as Hsao Lung
- Ali Tayler
- Alice Meyer as Alice
- George Stephens
- Li Wen-tai
- San Peng as Sumo Wrestler #2
- Bruce Lee (Archive footage)

== Reception ==
The film has received generally negative reviews.

John Wallis of DVD Talk awarded the film a rare zero stars out of five and said: "Not only is a bad film for its horrible story, and lack of any action worth noting, it tramples Bruce's name like no other, inserting stock footage of his press conferences, his funeral, newspapers reporting his death, and using Bruce film clips (under a horrible saturated, polarized color effect) as signs that the Bruce-clone daydreams and is inhabited by the spirit of the real Bruce. Unless you are the most die-hard of Bruceploitation fans/completists, its really not worth a second of your life."

The Video Vacuum gave the film 2 stars and said: "Once Bruce dons the patented yellow and black track suit for the finale, the film briefly comes to life. The scenes where he has to fight level by level like Game of Death are pretty good. Sadly, it’s too little too late. The best part of the movie though is Bruce’s sex scene. He gets drugged right before getting it on and while he’s in the throes of passion, he starts freaking out and convulsing out of control. It’s pretty hilarious."

Jeff Bona of City on Fire gave the film 0 stars and said: "As a kid, I remember renting True Game of Death on VHS (Master Arts Video). The DVD version I recently watched (Fortune 5 DVD) has a lot more footage, which includes: Excessive nudity (bush and all), an extended nightclub sequence, and a slightly different opening shot. The VHS version had the same Bruce Lee stock footage, only in different areas. You know what? Who cares about the different versions. They all suck. True Game of Death is not one of the worst Bruceploitation movies ever made, it IS the worst."
