= Concord Production Inc. =

Hong Kong production company

- Opening logo from the film Way of the Dragon
- Native name: 協和電影公司
- Type: Public company
- Industry: Film production
- Founded: 1972
- Founder: Bruce Lee; Raymond Chow
- Defunct: 1976
- Fate: Dissolution; Assets absorbed and acquired by Golden Harvest Productions
- Successor: Golden Harvest
- Headquarters: Hong Kong (British Empire)
- Key people: Bruce Lee; Raymond Chow
- Products: movies

Concord Production Inc. (Chinese: 協和電影公司) (simply known as Concord Films) was a Hong Kong production company founded in 1972 in Hong Kong by Bruce Lee and Raymond Chow (50%). Lee was in charge of the creative decisions and Chow was in charge of the administration. Golden Harvest was in charge of distribution. The Lee Estate owns 51% of Concord Films, the other 49% belonging to Chow. Concord has the following in its library: 1–Way of the Dragon, 2–50% of Enter the Dragon, 3–Game of Death footage. Raymond and the Estate agree to settle up for a flat fee buy out. Raymond buys the 51% of Concord. After Lee's death, Linda Lee Cadwell, his wife, sold his portion to Chow in 1976. Concord went defunct in 1976, absorbed by Golden Harvest. Raymond Chow went on to continue running Golden Harvest.

== Productions ==
- The Way of the Dragon (1972) with Golden Harvest
- The Game of Death (1972 – original footage of the director's version) with Golden Harvest; unfinished because of Bruce Lee's death (An article on this subject in simple English is also available)
- Enter the Dragon (1973) with Warner Bros.
- Bruce Lee: the Man and the Legend (1973) with Golden Harvest
- Arrangements with
  - Riccardo Billi (producer) in Way of the Dragon
  - Sequoia Pictures in Enter the Dragon
