= Bruce's Fist of Vengeance =

- Directed by: Bill James
- Written by: Bill James; Bugsy Dabao
- Produced by: K.Y. Lim
- Starring: Bruce Le; Jack Lee; Romano Kristoff; Manny Luna; Eve Wong
- Cinematography: Felizandro Bailen; Popoy Orense; Vic Anao
- Music by: Totoy Nuke
- Distributed by: Kinavesa International
- Release date: August 22, 1980
- Running time: 89 minutes
- Country: Philippines

Bruce's Fist of Vengeance is a 1980 Bruceploitation martial arts movie from the Philippines starring notorious Bruce Lee imitator Bruce Le.

== Synopsis ==
To compete in his friend Peter's martial arts tournament, Jack flies into Manila from Hong Kong and brings along a book of secret Jeet Kune Do techniques that was entrusted to him by the late martial arts legend Bruce Lee. During the competition, Jack witnesses Peter's defeat at the hands and feet of his academy's rival master, Miguel. Peter gets the book from Jack, just as Miguel learns about its existence. Miguel sends his best fighters to seize the book. Instead, they kidnap Jack and Peter's girlfriend Miriam and hold them ransom in exchange for the book. Now, working commando, Peter uses the secrets of the book to free his woman and best friend.

== Cast ==
- Bruce Le as Peter
- Romano Kristoff as Miguel
- Jack Lee as Jack
- Jim Gaines as James
- Carla Reynolds as Miriam
- Ken Watanabe as Samurai Master from Japan

== Reception ==
Mark Pollard of KungFuCinema.com gives the film zero stars out of five and said: "Craptastic doesn't begin to describe just how bad Bruce's Fist of Vengeance really is. Congratulations if you're reading this, because you just found a review for one of the worst kung fu movies ever filmed"

Thevideovacuum gave the film 2 stars out of 4 and said: "No matter how many things this flick had going for it, I still had one major beef: The fight scenes. Yeah, Jack had a couple nifty comical fights early on, but the more serious battles later in the film are either sped up way too fast or filmed in the slowest slow motion in history. In one scene Bruce Le will be running around like The Monkees karate chopping people, then the next, he’ll be in such Super Slow Mo that it looks like he’s hardly even moving. The fast motion scenes are particularly idiotic because they occur in the section of the film when Bruce is trying to avenge his friend’s death. Nothing and I mean nothing ruins the mood of a good old fashioned vendetta than silly looking fast motion that makes you look like Benny Hill."
