= Soul Brothers of Kung Fu =

1977 Hong Kong film by Shan Hua

- 被迫
- Directed by: Shan Hua
- Written by: Chan-Wei Lin
- Starring: Bruce Li; Ku Feng; Meng Lo; Carl Scott
- Release date: 1977
- Country: Hong Kong
- Language: Mandarin

Soul Brothers of Kung Fu (Chinese: 被迫), also known as Bei po, is a 1977 martial arts film starring Bruce Li.

== Plot ==
Three refugees in Hong Kong befriend a young teenager and get mixed up in a world of gangs and violence.

== Trivia ==
Film director Quentin Tarantino rated Soul Brothers of Kung Fu number 14 on his list of 82 favorite kung-fu movies of all time.

== United States title change ==
The film's original title was Bei po and in 2022, the South China Morning Post wrote "The US distributors had figured out pretty quickly that the main audience for martial arts films were the minorities. To connect with urban viewers – mainly African-Americans – they would change the titles of the films to things like Soul Brothers of Kung Fu, or Black Belt Soul Brother. They would find some connection to an American urban audience."

== Critical reception ==
Quentin Tarantino wrote in his review of the film on the New Beverly Cinema website "It’s a classic tale of friendship, betrayal, and revenge that always manages to be more engaging and involving than it has any right to be."

AllMovie rated the film one star out of five.
