= Super Dragon: The Bruce Lee Story =

1974 Hong Kong film by Shih Ti

- Export poster with the initial overseas title
- Directed by: Shih Ti
- Screenplay by: Lui Ban Chung
- Produced by: Cheung Tai Wai
- Starring: Bruce Li; Cheng Fu-Hung; Yue Fan; Ngai Yat-Ping; Anne Winton
- Cinematography: Chui Dung Heung
- Music by: Wong Mau Saan
- Release date: 1974
- Running time: 90 minutes
- Country: Hong Kong
- Language: Cantonese

Super Dragon: The Bruce Lee Story (Chinese: 一代猛龍) (Note: The film was released in international markets under various titles, such as Bruce Lee: A Dragon Story, Super Dragon, Bruce Lee - Super Dragon, The Bruce Lee Story, and The Dragon Dies Hard in the United States.) is a 1974 Bruceploitation film starring Bruce Lee impersonator Bruce Li. The film is a loose biopic about martial artist and actor Bruce Lee and centers on his supposed affair with actress Betty Ting-Pei. The film is notable for being the first biopic about Lee (it was released a year after his death), the debut film of Li as a Lee impersonator, and the first entry in the Bruceploitation genre.

== Plot ==
The film attempts to chronicle Bruce Lee's career from his The Green Hornet days up to the time of his death. The film opens with a pre-fame Bruce Lee (Bruce Li) delivering newspapers in Seattle, Washington. Lee then becomes a martial arts teacher. Lee competes in a martial arts tournament and wins. After the match he is offered the role of the Kato in The Green Hornet. He marries Linda Lee Cadwell and they have 2 children together.

Later, Lee goes to Hong Kong. He turns down a contract from Shaw Brothers due to a pay dispute. The wife of director Lo Wei offers Lee a contract at Golden Harvest which he accepts. Lee makes his first film which becomes very successful at the box office. At a celebration event Lee meets actress Betty Ting-Pei. The two later fall in love. Bruce does his second film which is another success at the box office. Lee turns down Lo Wei's next film offer and opts to direct his next film himself. While on set Lee begins to experience severe headaches. Betty reveals to Bruce that she is pregnant. Later Linda arrives in Hong Kong to visit Bruce. Bruce decides to get a divorce and be with Betty. One night while Betty is making dinner Bruce suffers a headache and Betty tells him to take a nap. Later when Betty tries to wake Lee she finds him dead.

== Reviews ==
A review by the website, cityonfire.com gave the film 4 out of 10. The reviewer said "Make no mistake, 'Bruce Lee: A Dragon Story' is a terrible Bruceploitation movie. The shits and giggles come automatically due to the horrendous dubbing (it's so bad, it's good!) and all that other cheesy retro stuff". He also said that at the same time, he enjoyed trash-cinema like Bruce Lee: A Dragon Story so his rating was based more on the average chop-socky viewer than a "Bruce Li whore", as he was.

== Releases ==
Video and DVD
Title	Company and catalogue	Year	Format	Notes #
Bruce Lee: A Dragon Story	Ocean Shores Video Limited OS-066	1980	Betamax video cassette	

== Cast ==
- Bruce Li as Bruce Lee
- Cheng Fu-Hung as Da Jung, thug
- Chin Yung-Hsiang as Sir Run Run Shaw
- Ngai Yat-Ping as Japanese Sword Master
- Woo Hon-Cheung as party guest
- Anne Winton
- Shih Ting-Ken (extra)
- Tsang Ming-Cheong (extra)
- Robert Tai (extra)
- Suen Shu-Pau (extra)

=== Stunts ===
- Chen Chin-Hai (coordinator)
