= The Image of Bruce Lee =

1978 Hong Kong film by Yeung Kuen

- Hanyu Pinyin: 猛男大賊脂虎
- Directed by: Yeung Kuen
- Written by: Zhaoquan Weng
- Produced by: Alex Guow
- Starring: Bruce Li; Leih Chang; Danna; Bolo Yeung; John Cheung
- Music by: Frankie Chan
- Distributed by: 21st Century Distribution (North America)
- Release date: 31 August 1978 (Hong Kong)
- Running time: 91 minutes
- Country: Hong Kong
- Language: Cantonese

The Image of Bruce Lee is a 1978 action film. It was originally released in Hong Kong as 猛男大賊脂虎 Meng nan da zei yan zhi hu (International English title: Storming Attacks), although the Bruceploitation title was added for its American release.

It stars Bruce Li as a special agent who teams with a Hong Kong police officer to crack a smuggling ring (among the smugglers: Bolo Yeung). Apart from the title, the only thing this film has to do with Bruce Lee is when someone tells the Bruce Li character that he resembles Lee.

== Reaction ==
In the fanzine Exit the Dragon, Enter the Tiger, Carl Jones writes:

"Image of Bruce Lee has been likened to an episode of The Sweeney with martial arts thrown in. It certainly has the look of a gritty 70's cop show...The fights are good and realistic and Li gets to show some handy moves with a Bokken (wooden Japanese sword) during one particular scrap with the boss's goons."

The film is admired by Quentin Tarantino who wrote "While it maybe lacking in the script department, and the fights, though good, are usually unprovoked and undramatic, the cast is good".

== See also ==
- List of films in the public domain in the United States
