= Elliott Hong =

American film director

- Born: Hong Eui-Bong; South Korea
- Occupations: Director, producer, writer

Elliott Hong is a Korean American film director, producer and writer.

Hong is best known as the director of the films They Call Me Bruce?, The Retrievers, Kill the Golden Goose and the 1973 documentary Tears of Buddha.

== Filmography ==
- Tears of Buddha (1973)
- Kill the Golden Goose (1979)
- The Retrievers (1982)
- They Call Me Bruce? (1982)
- From Seoul with Soul (1983)
- The Rose of Sharon (2006)
- Never Divided Again (2007)
