= Exit the Dragon, Enter the Tiger =

1976 Hong Kong film by Tso Nam Lee

- U.S. theatrical release poster
- Traditional Chinese: 天皇巨星
- Simplified Chinese: 天皇巨星
- Directed by: Tso Nam Lee
- Written by: Hsin Yee Chang
- Produced by: Wong Fung
- Starring: Bruce Li
- Cinematography: Yip Cheng-Biu
- Edited by: Chiu Kuei Huang
- Music by: Fu Liang Chou
- Production company: Hong Kong Alpha Motion Picture Company
- Distributed by: Dimension Pictures
- Release date: 1976
- Running time: 84 minutes
- Countries: Hong Kong; Taiwan
- Language: Mandarin
- Box office: $1,455,235

Exit the Dragon, Enter the Tiger (Chinese title: 天皇巨星; Cantonese: Tian huang ju xing), also released as Bruce Lee: The Star of Stars, is a 1976 Bruceploitation film starring Bruce Li. The title is a play on the Bruce Lee film Enter the Dragon and is one of the most well-known films in the Bruceploitation genre.

== Plot ==
The film tells the story of David "The Tiger" Lee, who was a student, protégé and successor of Bruce "The Dragon" Lee. "The Tiger" comes to Hong Kong in search of answers regarding the mysterious death of his shih-fu "The Dragon".

The character Susie Yung represents Betty Ting Pei, whom "The Tiger" teams up with as they both take on "The Baron", the head of the Hong Kong mafia, in search of the truth regarding the death of the late martial arts legend "The Dragon".

== Cast ==
=== Main roles ===
- Bruce Li as David "The Tiger" Lee
- Yi Chang as "The Baron"
- Chang Sing Yee as Susie Yung

=== Supporting roles ===
- Ko Hsiao Pao as HKPD Officer Ko Hsiao Pao
- Lung Fei
- Shan Mao as Sam
- Chin Kang as Wa
- An Ping as George

=== Guest roles ===
- Ma Chiang
- Chen Shen Lin as Thug #1
- Lin Chong as Thug #2
- Hsiao Min Hsiung as Thug #3
- Lee Fat Yuen as Extra #1
- Cheng Fu Hung as Huge thug
- Wang Fei as Chiu's man
- Chi Fu Chiang as Baron's bodyguard
- Yen-Chen Cheng as Singaporean karate champ
- Bruce Lee as Himself (archive footage)
- Bolo Yeung as Himself (archive footage)

== Production ==
=== Music ===
The film's music was composed by Fu Liang Chou under the name of Chow Fook-Leung. Similar to other film scores by Fu Liang Chou, excerpts from popular music of that time can be heard interpolated in the score. These excerpts include pieces of John Barry's 1974 score to The Man with the Golden Gun, Pink Floyd's "Shine On You Crazy Diamond", and Isaac Hayes' theme to Three Tough Guys, among others.

== Sequel ==
In 1978 a sequel was released titled Return of the Tiger. Li returned as a different character and the film co-starred Angela Mao.
