= Fists of Bruce Lee =

1979 Taiwanese-Hong Kong film by Bruce Li and Kim Hyung-joon

- American theatrical release poster
- Directed by: Bruce Li; Kim Hyung-Joon
- Produced by: Yu-Chi Huang
- Starring: Bruce Li
- Release date: April 17, 1979 (Hong Kong)
- Running time: 92 minutes
- Countries: Taiwan; Hong Kong
- Language: Cantonese

Fists of Bruce Lee (Chinese: 伏擊) is a 1979 Bruceploitation film starring Bruce Lee imitator, Bruce Li. Co-directed by Li and Kim Hyung-Joon, the film was released in Hong Kong on April 17, 1979.

== Synopsis ==
Bruce Lee (Bruce Li) is assigned to go undercover as Lee Min-Chin to investigate a drug ring. The mob hires an assassin to kill him. They are both great at what they do; as they fight to the death only one will come out alive.

== Cast ==
- Bruce Li (Ho Chung Tao) as Bruce Lee/Lee Min-Chin
- Lieh Lo
- Yuan Chuan
- Ping-Ao Wei as Outpuss
- Lung Tang
- Yi Tao Chang
- Fu Mei Po

== Reception ==
JJ Bona of City on fire said: "I think it’s safe to say that the components which make up the visual element of the film (sets, clothes, camerawork & fights) would be much better if we saw the restored/remastered version. Otherwise, not a bad flick at all (I’ve been through and can think of worse fodder) though I think Ho Chung Tao surpassed himself with The Chinese Stuntman."
