= Fist of Fury III =

1979 Hong Kong film by Lee Tso-nam

- Theatrical release poster
- Directed by: Lee Tso-nam
- Written by: Lung Yueh
- Produced by: Ping Chung Hung
- Starring: Bruce Li; Ku Feng; Tong Yim-chan; Chow Siu-loi
- Release date: 4 May 1979 (Hong Kong)
- Running time: 91 minutes
- Country: Hong Kong
- Languages: Cantonese; Mandarin

Fist of Fury III (Chinese: 截拳鷹爪功) (Note: Also known as Fist of Fury Part III: Jeet Kune the Claws and the Supreme Kung Fu) is a 1979 Hong Kong Bruceploitation film directed by Lee Tso-nam, and written by Lung Yueh. The film stars Bruce Li, Ku Feng, Tong Yim-chan, and Chow Siu-loi.

== Plot ==
It continues the story of Chen Shen (Bruce Li) from Fist of Fury Part II: Fistful of the Dragon (1977), the brother of Chen Zhen (Bruce Lee) character in Fist of Fury: The Chinese Connection (1972).

After avenging the death of his brother, Chen Shen (Bruce Li) returns home from Shanghai. He promises his mother, who went blind from crying over her son's death, to no longer fight. Japanese occupiers who know of Chen's history terrorize his family by vandalizing his mother's store and beating up his brother. Later, they frame Chen for murder. After the Japanese boss arrives in town and causes a ruckus, Chen breaks out of jail for a final confrontation.

== Reception ==
Critical reception was mixed.

Eric Reifschneider of Blood Brothers gave the film 2/5 and said: "I found this third entry worth a watch but overall it was just rather uninteresting. Perhaps with better filmmakers would this have been a rousing martial arts movie but as is it just left me a little hallow inside. Like usual with these post-Bruce Lee Bruceploitation films we get graced with an ultra shitty DVD of it in America. This DVD makes my DVDS for Chinese Connection 2 and Exit the Dragon look like Criterion releases! The film has horrible compression artifacts and the audio transfer that has high pitched cracking whenever a character talks. Perhaps with an actual good transfer of the film I would have enjoyed it more but for now I'm stuck with this shit DVD. Ironically the film is in a double feature with New Fist of Fury, that "other" sequel to Fist of Fury starring Jackie Chan."
