= Bruce Li =

Chinese American actor and martial artist (born 1950)

- Bruce Li as he appears in the 1975 film Goodbye Bruce Lee: His Last Game of Death
- Born: Ho Chung-tao (何宗道); 5 June 1950 (age 76); Taiwan
- Years active: 1973–95, 2023

Chinese name
- Traditional Chinese: 黎小龍
- Simplified Chinese: 黎小龙
Transcriptions
Standard Mandarin
- Hanyu Pinyin: Lí Xiǎolóng
Yue: Cantonese
- Jyutping: lai4 siu2 lung4
- Musical career
- Also known as: James Ho

Bruce Li (Chinese: 何宗道; pinyin: Hé Zōngdào; born Ho Chung-tao; 5 June 1950) is a Chinese martial artist and actor who starred in martial arts films from the Bruceploitation movement.

== Career ==
Ho Chung-tao went to play a stuntman in Taiwan and Hong Kong under the name of James Ho.

After the death of Bruce Lee, Ho's acting career began. Hong Kong studios believed that Ho had the ability to pick up where Lee left off and cast him in similar types of martial arts films. They first cast him in Conspiracy. Afterwards, the producers of Game of Death asked Ho to finish their movie in Lee's role, but he declined.

Afterward, he was employed by producer/actor Jimmy Shaw, who gave him the name of Bruce Li.

While Ho was finishing his military service, he appeared in Goodbye Bruce Lee: His Last Game of Death. He starred in other Bruceploitation pictures in 1976 with The Young Bruce Lee and Bruce Lee: The Man, The Myth.

Using the name Bruce Li, some Taiwanese and Hong Kong producers decided to directly credit him as Bruce Lee, even going so far as to use the real Bruce Lee's picture on posters. Ho even appeared in Bruce Lee Against Supermen, where he stars as Kato (Carter in the English dub version), a role loosely based on the Green Hornet's Kato played by Lee.

In 1975, Dragon Dies Hard became a hit in Japan, where it earned ¥2 billion ($6.7 million) at the box office.

The producers really wanted to show Li as the "official" successor to Bruce Lee. In the 1976 movie Exit the Dragon, Enter the Tiger, Li meets Lee, who says Li should replace him. The film's title relates to Lee being dubbed the Dragon and Li the Tiger. Li appeared in Return of the Tiger starring Angela Mao. In it, Li fights Paul L. Smith.

Li appeared in two unofficial sequels to Lee's classic Fist of Fury.

In 1976, Li reprised his role as Lee in the biopic Bruce Lee: The True Story (also known as Bruce Lee: The Man, The Myth). Li choreographed the combat sequences. This movie was quite successful, with fans dubbing it one of the best biopics of Lee.

Li kept shooting martial arts movies until the 1980s. He also directed a few including The Chinese Stuntman (1981).

Li eventually ran into trouble separating himself from playing Lee, along with standing out from other impersonators in Bruceploitation. In the mid-1980s, he become a physical education instructor at Taipei's Ping Chung University and taught martial arts to comedian apprentices. He later appeared only briefly in martial arts cinema or Bruce Lee documentaries.

In 1990, Li retired from acting at age 40 after his wife's sudden death to raise his children.

Bruce Li's career was the focus of a segment of the 1995 documentary Top Fighter. In the segment, Li said he was unhappy that the studios wanted to turn him into a Bruce Lee marketing gimmick, saying, "I could act like him but I could never be him", though at the time, Li did willingly accept the roles. He elaborated on this further with his appearance in the 2023 documentary Enter the Clones of Bruce, in which he elaborated more on his roles and why he left the business.

== Filmography ==
| Year | Title | Role | Notes | Ref. |
|---|---|---|---|---|
| 1972 | Duel in the Tiger Den (翻山虎) | Japanese Boss | Credited as Chung Tao Ho | |
| 1972 | Gecko Kung Fu (壁虎遊龍) | | Credited as Ho Chung Tao | |
| 1972 | The Death Duel (惡報) | Extra | Credited as Ho Tsung-Tao | |
| 1972 | Triangular Duel (鐵三角) | | | |
| 1973 | Chinese Iron Man (中國鐵人) | Bad Master | Credited as Ho Chung Tao | |
| 1974 | Hero of Kwangtong (廣東好漢) | Member of Luk's family | Credited as Ho Chung Tao | |
| 1974 | Rikisha Kuri (大車伕) | Japanese Thug | Credited as Ho Chung Tao | |
| 1974 | Super Dragon: The Bruce Lee Story (Note: The film was released in international markets under various titles, such as Bruce Lee: A Dragon Story, Super Dragon, Bruce Lee - Super Dragon, The Bruce Lee Story, and The Dragon Dies Hard in the United States.) (一代猛龍) | Bruce Lee/Li Xiao Long | | |
| 1975 | Goodbye Bruce Lee: His Last Game of Death (新死亡遊戲) | Lee Hon Hung | | |
| 1975 | Bruce Lee, We Miss You! (金色太陽) | Stone | | |
| 1975 | Enter the Panther (詭計) | Shu Yu-Lung | | |
| 1975 | Bruce Lee Against Supermen (猛龍征東) | Kato (Carter In the English dub version) | | |
| 1976 | The Legend of Bruce Lee (唐山截拳道) | Bruce Lee | | |
| 1976 | Exit the Dragon, Enter the Tiger (天皇巨星) | Tiger/David/Tan Lung | | |
| 1976 | The Ming Patriots (中原鏢局) | Li Tia-Long | | |
| 1976 | The Dragon Lives (Note: Also known as He's a Legend, He's a Hero and King of Kung Fu. The film is sometimes mistaken for Bruce Lee: The Man, The Myth, a film that also stars Bruce Li and was also released in 1976.) (詠春大兄) | Bruce Lee | | |
| 1976 | Bruce Lee's Secret (詠春截拳) | Bruce Lee | | |
| 1976 | Bruce Lee: the Man, the Myth (李小龍傳奇) | Bruce Lee | | |
| 1977 | Return of the Tiger (大圈套) | Chang Hung | | |
| 1977 | Fist of Fury II (精武門續集) | Chen Shen | | |
| 1977 | The Real Bruce Lee (最後精武門) | Kato (unreleased footage) | Documentary | |
| 1977 | Soul Brothers of Kung Fu (被迫) | Wong Wai-Lung | | |
| 1978 | Bruce Li's Magnum Fist (大英雄) | | | |
| 1978 | Bruce Lee The Invincible (威震天南) | Yu Fong | | |
| 1978 | Edge of Fury (撈家撈女撈上撈) | Fong Pao | | |
| 1978 | Dynamo (不擇手段) | Lee Tien-Yee | | |
| 1978 | Bruce Lee in New Guinea (蛇珠) | Wan Li | | |
| 1978 | The Image of Bruce Lee (猛男大賊胭脂虎) | Wei Man | | |
| 1978 | Deadly Strike (神龍) | | | |
| 1979 | Bruce and the Iron Finger (大教頭與騷娘子) | Bruce Lee | | |
| 1979 | The Lama Avenger (打出頭) | Hong Tian-De | | |
| 1979 | Fists of Bruce Lee (伏擊) | Lee Min-Chin | Co-directed with Kim Hyung-Joon | |
| 1979 | Fist of Fury III (截拳鷹爪功) | Chen Zhen | | |
| 1979 | The Iron Dragon Strikes Back (匯峰號黃金大風暴) | Ah Wai | | |
| 1979 | Blind Fist of Bruce (盲拳鬼手) | Yeh Chen Lung | | |
| 1981 | The Chinese Stuntman (龍的影子) | Tang Wei | Also director | |
| 1982 | Dragon Force (神探光頭妹) | Dai Lung | | |
| 1983 | Pink Trap (粉紅色陷阱) | | | |
| 1988 | Future Hunters | | | |
| 1990 | Yellowthread Street | Barman | TV series - 1 episode | |
| 1991 | Kickboxer the Champion | | | |
