= Return of the Tiger =

1978 Hong Kong film by Jimmy Shaw

- American theatrical release poster
- Directed by: Jimmy Shaw
- Written by: Hsin Yi Chang
- Starring: Bruce Li; Paul L. Smith; Angela Mao
- Edited by: Vincent Leung
- Music by: Fu Liang Chou
- Release date: 7 April 1978
- Running time: 97 minutes
- Country: Hong Kong

Return of the Tiger is a 1978 Hong Kong martial arts Bruceploitation film starring Bruce Li and a sequel to Exit the Dragon, Enter the Tiger.

== Synopsis ==
Chang Hung, who works for a rival organization, and his female partner devise an elaborate plan to take out a heroin ring led by the nefarious Paul the Westerner.

== Cast ==
- Bruce Li as Chang Hung
- Paul L. Smith as Paul the Westerner
- Angela Mao as Chang Hung's Partner
- Fei Lung as Mr. Sing
- Hsing Hsieh as Mr. Wong (Sing's Hired Assassin)
- Chang Yi as Peter, Paul's Henchman
- Cheng Fu-Hsiung as Tom, Paul's Henchman
- Fei Wang as Yu Ching, Sing's Henchman

== Reception ==
Eric Reifschneider gave the film 2 out of 5 and said: "I didn't quite like it as much as Exit the Dragon, Enter the Tiger but for fans of these trashy martial arts films Return of the Tiger is a must watch." Comeuppance Reviews gave the film 3 and a half stars and said: "There are other memorable moments as well, making Return of the Tiger a cut above the legion of similar films being released at this time."
