= Hong Wai =

Chinese artist based in France

- 洪慧
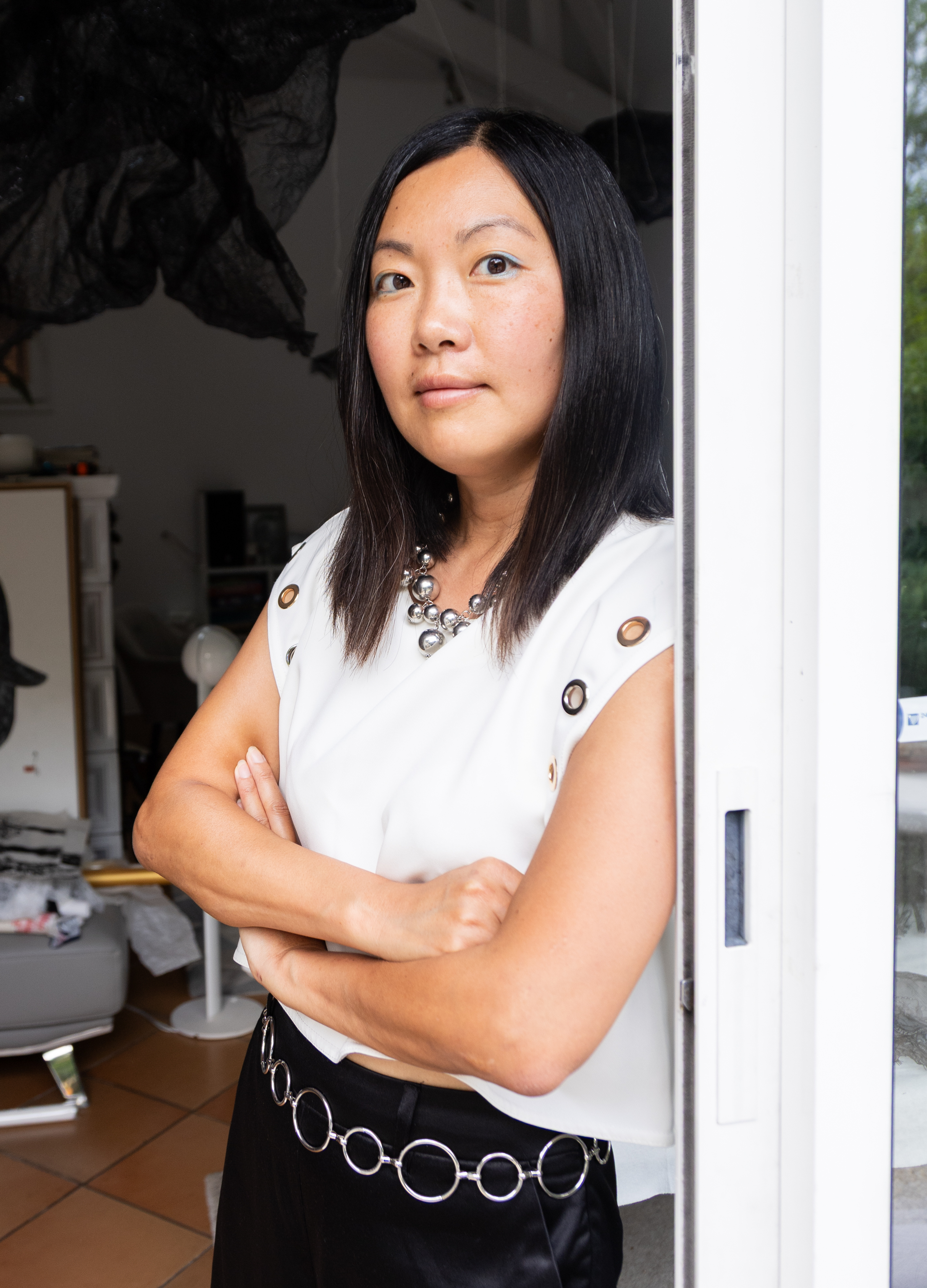
- Hong in 2025
- Born: 1982 (age 43–44); Shanghai, China
- Education: National Taiwan University (BA); School for Advanced Studies in the Social Sciences (MA)
- Occupation: Artist
- Years active: 2000–present

Hong Wai is a Chinese artist based in Paris and Macau. Her work involves the mediums of Chinese ink and lace and has been exhibited in venues like the Museum of the Orient in Portugal and Volta Basel in Basel, among other museums and art fairs around the world.

== Early life and education ==
Hong was born in Shanghai, China in 1982. She was raised in Macau, with some time spent in Taiwan. She began learning Chinese ink painting at the age of 14.

Hong graduated from National Taiwan University with a B.A. in Chinese literature. She then earned a master's degree in the theories and practices of art and language from the School for Advanced Studies in the Social Sciences. In the latter institution, she specifically concentrated on the artistry of the Chinese literati.

== Career ==
Hong's work has since been exhibited in various galleries like the Museum of the Orient in Portugal, the Macau Museum of Art in Macau, Kiaf in Seoul, Sotheby's Gallery in Hong Kong, Art Stage Singapore in Singapore, and Art Taipei in Taiwan, among others.

From a young age, Hong's work sought to incorporate Chinese ink painting and calligraphy techniques into more modern and socially engaged contexts, especially to express femininity in a historically male-dominated field of art. She had her first exhibition at UNESCO Macau, at the age of seventeen, where she showed ink paintings. In 2013, she developed the style of "ink lace," in which she sought to depict the textures of textile through ink painting and calligraphy.

In 2023, Hong moved from Chinese calligraphy to lace work, involving the creation of sculptures woven out of the thin material with which she continued to express her subversive ideas about gender and the body; by weaving Chinese characters out of lace, however, Chinese calligraphy remained a part of her work. Following her move to Paris, France, her work additionally began to move fluidly between eastern and western forms and ideas.

In 2025, from February 28 to March 21, Hong had an exhibition of both ink paintings and lace work at Soho House, in Sheung Wan, Hong Kong, titled No Way to be Good, after a lyric in the 1985 Anita Mui song "Bad Girl." Her first solo show dedicated to ink lace, the exhibition was curated by Luke Chapman, of Art Bridger, and Lei Chin Pan, a scholar of popular culture, and featured several sculptures wherein lace was folded into Chinese characters. The South China Morning Post noted the exhibition's "sense of rebelliousness," both within Hong's work, as well as the eighties era of Cantopop with which it is in conversation. The exhibition also featured an appearance by the humanoid robot Sophia, who performed "Bad Girl" on its last day.

== Collaborations ==
In 2019, Hong collaborated with French lingerie brand Aubade in order to design a product line of lingerie produced by Inter-Spitzen, an embroidery company based in Switzerland. Martina Brown, deputy managing director of Aubade, called her a "perfect fit" for Aubade. The collaboration, Hong Wai for Aubade, launched in 2020.

At Volta Basel in 2025, Hong collaborated with the humanoid robot Sophia. The collaboration involved "Sophia's algorithmic interpretation and final material manifestation" of Hong's ink gestures, digitized, and involved eighteen months of creation and training on both ends. Both Hong and Sophia's pieces were shown at the Artbridger gallery at Volta Basel.

== Personal life ==
Hong is currently based in both Paris, France and Macau, China.
