= The Dragon Lives =

1976 Hong Kong film by Singloy Wang

- Traditional Chinese: 詠春大兄
- Simplified Chinese: 咏春大兄
- Literal meaning: Wing Chun Big Boss
- Hanyu Pinyin: yǒng chūn dà xiōng
- Directed by: Singloy Wang
- Written by: Yi Kwan; Sung Hsiang-yu
- Produced by: C.H. Wong
- Starring: Bruce Li; Caryn White; Betty Chen; Ernest 'Curt' Curtis
- Cinematography: Chen Wing Sing
- Music by: Anders Nelsson
- Production company: First Films
- Release date: 7 October 1976
- Running time: 90 minutes
- Country: Hong Kong
- Language: Mandarin

The Dragon Lives (Chinese: 詠春大兄; pinyin: Yǒng Chūn Dà Xiōng; Jyutping: wing6 cheun1 daai6 hing1), also known as He's a Legend, He's a Hero, is a 1976 Hong Kong martial arts film starring Bruce Li and directed by Wang Hsing-lei (credited as Singloy Wang). A fictional account of Bruce Lee's life, it is one of numerous films which exploited the popularity of Lee after his death, a practice called Bruceploitation. The film was released in the United States by Film Ventures International on 19 September 1978.

The film has often been mistaken for Bruce Lee: The Man, The Myth, another 1976 film depicting Bruce Lee's life and starring Bruce Li.

== Cast ==
- Ho Chung-tao (Bruce Li) as Bruce Lee
- Caryn White as Lin, Bruce's wife
- Chen Pei-zhen (Betty Chen) as Betty Ting Pei
- Ernest 'Curt' Curtis as Sam Curtis, a boxer
- Joe Nerbonne
- Fred Cargle
- Lee Wan-chung (Li Won Chung) as Raymond Chow, a film producer
- Elton Hugee
- Jim Burnett
- Kjell Wallen
- Mark Ruth
- Jack Nickelson
- Su Hsiang as Lo Wei, a film director
- Hsieh Han as swordsman in film-shooting
- Yam Ho as Bruce's friend

== Release ==
The Dragon Lives was released in Hong Kong on 7 October 1976. In the United States, the film was released by Film Ventures International on 19 September 1978.

=== Critical response ===
Poll, a critic for the American film magazine Variety, criticized the technical deficiencies of The Dragon Lives ("cracking noises regularly precede the blows themselves.... characters appear in consecutive frames dressed differently"), but noted that its target audience is the least critical among moviegoers. The critic would also surmise that the film could have a short run in cinemas due to being less bloody than other Bruce Lee-inspired films.

== Home media ==
The Dragon Lives was released on DVD in the United States on 12 March 2002.
