= Goodbye Bruce Lee: His Last Game of Death =

- Theatrical release poster
- Directed by: Pin Lin; Harold B. Swartz
- Written by: Lu-Yueh Lin
- Produced by: Robert Chow; Chiu-pi Lo; Chang Lung
- Starring: Bruce Li
- Cinematography: Tony Shang
- Music by: Mou Shan Huang
- Distributed by: Shaw Brothers; Celestial Pictures
- Release date: February 10, 1975 (Taiwan)
- Running time: 83 mins.

Goodbye Bruce Lee: His Last Game of Death, also known as Legend of Bruce Lee in the United Kingdom, and The New Game of Death in Hong Kong, is a 1975 Taiwanese Bruceploitation martial arts film starring Bruce Li.

== Synopsis ==
A young man (Bruce Li) unwittingly gets wrapped up in a money scam. He obtains a bag full of money, after which he is attacked by a group of thugs and a tall basketball player. When he refuses to give the cash back to the criminals, they kidnap his girlfriend and hold her hostage in the Tower of Death. Once there, he is given two options. Watch his girlfriend get thrown off the top or fight various martial arts champions from around the world on 7 different levels to win his girlfriend back.

The Tower Guardians:

- A synchronized pair of kung-fu experts from China.
- A katana-wielding Samurai from Japan.
- A bō-wielding karateka from Okinawa.
- A strong and beastly wrestler from Russia.
- A nunchaku-wielding yogi-fighter from India.
- And a bare-knuckled boxer from America.

The last opponent which is a Muhammad Ali look-a-like, talks a lot with cockiness but ends up surrendering easily after getting outclassed. Finally, on the last level, the protagonist engages in a drawn-out fight with a whip-wielding crime boss from Hong Kong, while the remaining henchmen hold his girlfriend over the Tower's ledge. After the young hero wins the last fight, the villains release his girlfriend and surrender to the police.

== Release ==
The film was released in 1975 in Hong Kong, Taiwan, West Germany, and the Netherlands. It was released in 1976 in the United States, Denmark, and France, where it sold 630,452 tickets.

== Reception ==
Blood Brothers gave the film a 2 out of 5. Thevideovaccum.com gave the film 2.5 stars. Variedcelluloid gave the film 4 out of 5 stars.
