= Fist of Fury =

1972 Hong Kong film by Lo Wei

- Hong Kong film poster
- Traditional Chinese: 精武門
- Simplified Chinese: 精武门
- Literal meaning: Jingwu Tradition
- Hanyu Pinyin: Jīngwǔ Mén
- Jyutping: Zing1 Mou2 Mun4
- Directed by: Lo Wei
- Written by: Lo Wei; Ni Kuang (uncredited)
- Produced by: Raymond Chow
- Starring: Bruce Lee; Nora Miao; Chikara Hashimoto
- Cinematography: Chen Ching-chu
- Edited by: Peter Cheung
- Music by: Joseph Koo
- Production company: Golden Harvest
- Distributed by: Golden Harvest
- Release date: 22 March 1972
- Running time: 107 minutes
- Country: Hong Kong
- Languages: Mandarin; Cantonese (Note: As was the norm in Hong Kong films of the time, the film was shot MOS (without live sync sound), and later dubbed into separate Mandarin and Cantonese versions for release.)
- Budget: US$100,000
- Box office: US$100 million

Fist of Fury (Chinese: 精武門; lit. 'Jingwu Tradition'), initially released in North America as The Chinese Connection, is a 1972 Hong Kong martial arts film directed by Lo Wei and produced by Raymond Chow for Golden Harvest. The film stars Bruce Lee in his second major role after The Big Boss (1971), along with Nora Miao and Chikara Hashimoto. Lee also worked as the film's action choreographer. He portrays the character Chen Zhen, a student of Huo Yuanjia, fights to defend the honor of the Chinese in the face of foreign aggression and also exact vengeance responsible for Huo's death.

The film was Lee's second kung fu film and also touched on sensitive issues surrounding Japanese colonialism. It also featured fairly realistic fight choreography for its time and also differs from other films in the genre for its historical and social references, especially to Japanese imperialism.

Fist of Fury grossed an estimated US$100 million worldwide (equivalent to over $800 million adjusted for inflation) against a budget of $100,000. It was the highest-grossing Hong Kong film until Bruce Lee's following film The Way of the Dragon (1972).

== Plot ==
In 1908 Shanghai, Chen Zhen returns to Jingwu School to marry his fiancée Yuan Li'er, but learns that his master Huo Yuanjia has died, apparently from illness, which devastates him. During the funeral, members of a Japanese dojo in Hongkou District arrive to taunt the Jingwu students. Wu En, translator and advisor for the Japanese dojo's grandmaster Hiroshi Suzuki, taunts Chen by slapping him on the cheek several times and dares him to fight one of Suzuki's protégés.

They present a sign to Jingwu School, bearing the words "Sick Man of East Asia", seemingly to insult Huo Yuanjia, describing the Chinese as "weaklings" in comparison to the Japanese. The protégé taunts the Jingwu students to fight him and promises, "I'll eat those words if any Chinese here dare to fight and defeat me". Chen Zhen wants to retaliate, but is prevented by Fan Junxia, the most senior student in the school. Shortly afterwards, Chen Zhen goes to the Hongkou dojo alone to return the sign. He winds up fighting the Japanese students, defeating all of them, including their sensei, single-handedly. Chen smashes the glass on the sign and makes the students who taunted him earlier chew up the paper bearing the derogatory words, so as to make them literally "eat their words".

Later, Chen takes a stroll to a park, but a Sikh guard refuses him entry, due to a posted sign that forbids dogs and Chinese in the park. After the guard allows a foreigner to bring her pet dog into the park, a Japanese man approaches Chen and tells him that if he behaves like a dog, Chen will be allowed to go in. Chen beats up the man and his friends in anger. After the fight, Chen breaks the sign. The guard blows his whistle to alert the police, but the citizens who watched the whole fight help Chen to escape the park. The Japanese students and their master retaliate by attacking Jingwu School on Suzuki's orders. After causing severe damage, the Japanese students leave. Wu, accompanying the Japanese students, warns Jingwu School to hand over Chen.

Chen returns and realises that he has caused big trouble. His fellow students refuse to hand him over to the Japanese so they make plans to help him escape from Shanghai. That night, Chen sees Tian, the cook, and Feng Guishi, the caretaker, talking. Chen discovers that Master Huo had actually been poisoned by Tian. Chen kills Tian, followed by Feng while trying to determine why they killed Master Huo. Chen hangs Tian and Feng's bodies on a lamp post. Yuan Li'er finds him hiding near Huo's grave and they share a passionate moment together.

Meanwhile, Suzuki forces Inspector Lo to arrest Chen, but he eludes them. While Suzuki is entertaining his visiting Russian associate Petrov, Chen kills Wu and hangs his body on the lamp post. The angry Suzuki heads to the Japanese Consulate and reports Chen, then sends his men to Jingwu School to kill everyone inside. That same night, Chen barges into the dojo to take his revenge, killing the students' master, Yoshida, Petrov and Suzuki. Chen returns to Jingwu School and finds most from Jingwu School and the Hongkou dojo dead, but a few Jingwu students - among them Yuan, Fan Junxia and Xu - are still alive, as they had also been searching for Chen at the grave site, acting on a tip from Yuan.

Inspector Lo arrives at Jingwu to arrest Chen, who agrees to surrender himself to Lo to protect his master's legacy. Lo tells Chen that he can always trust him since he is Chinese. As they exit the school, Chen faces a line of armed Japanese soldiers and Western policemen at the outer gate, all pointing their guns at him. Furious, Chen charges the line and makes a flying kick, whereupon the soldiers shoot at him. As the shots are heard, the scene freezes while Chen is airborne.

== Cast ==
- Bruce Lee as Chen Zhen (Chinese: 陳真; pinyin: Chén Zhēn; Jyutping: Can^{4} Zan^{1})
- Nora Miao as Yuan Li'er (simplified Chinese: 袁丽儿; traditional Chinese: 袁麗兒; pinyin: Yuán Lì'er; Jyutping: Jyun^{4} Lai^{6} Ji^{4}), Chen's fiancée.
- Chikara Hashimoto (Note: Credited in English-language prints as 'Riki Hashimoto'.) as Hiroshi Suzuki (Japanese: 鈴木博; Suzuki Hiroshi), the master of the Hongkou dojo.
- Robert Baker as Petrov (Russian: Петров), a Russian gang boss and Suzuki's friend, who performed feats of strength.
- Tien Feng as Fan Chun-hsia (范君俠; Fàn Jūnxiá; Faan^{6} Gwan^{1} Hap^{6}), the seniormost student in Jing Wu School.
- James Tien as Fan Chia-chi (范家祺; Fàn Jiāqí; Faan^{6} Gaa^{1} Kei^{4}), the second eldest student in Jing Wu.
- Paul Wei as Wu En (胡恩; Hú ēn; Wu^{4} Jan^{1}), Suzuki's translator.
- Fung Ngai as Yoshida (吉田), the head instructor in the Hongkou dojo.
- Jun Katsumura as Nobu (忠雄), Suzuki’s bodyguard.
- Lo Wei as Police Inspector Lo (罗; 羅; Luó; Lo^{4})
- Huang Tsung-hsing as Tian (田; Tián), the cook in Jing Wu School.
- Han Ying-chieh as Feng Kwai-sher (冯贵石; 馮貴石; Féng Guìshí; Fung^{4} Gwai^{3} Sek^{6}, the caretaker in Jing Wu School, later revealed to be a Japanese spy.
- Lee Kwan as Xu, the third eldest student in Jing Wu.
- Maria Yi as Yen, a female Jing Wu student.
- Max Lee Chiu-chun and Peter Chan Lung as the senior Hongkou students, whom Chen forcefeeds paper after their defeat.

In addition to the principal cast, Unicorn Chan, Jackie Chan, and Yuen Biao appear as a Jingwu students; Lam Ching-ying, Cheung Wing-fat, Jhoon Rhee, and Corey Yuen appear as Hongkou students; and Yuen Wah appears as a Japanese bully Chen fights outside the park.

== Themes ==
Fist of Fury deals with topics of injustice, grief, revenge and consequences. Chen Zhen goes through a great deal of grief after the death of his master. This grief eats away at Zhen as well as the injustice he and his peers deal with from the Japanese racism towards them. The movie shows Zhen going out to get revenge but the cost is dear, losing the majority of his peers and his freedom.

== Production ==
=== Writing and casting ===
Though director Lo Wei is credited with writing the film, the screenplay was actually the work of prolific wuxia author Ni Kuang.

In the original script, Chen survived the end of the film, but Bruce Lee insisted that the character die at the conclusion, believing it was necessary to show the consequences of his vengeance.

Jackie Chan appeared in Fist of Fury, both as an extra and as a stunt double for the Japanese villain Hiroshi Suzuki (portrayed by Chikara "Riki" Hashimoto), particularly during the final fight scene where Lee kicks him and he flies through the air.

Robert Baker was a student of Lee's Jeet Kune Do school in California, whom Lee invited to appear in the film. Fist of Fury was his acting debut and his most significant film role, he appeared only in two films thereafter in minor parts.

The sequence where Chen is refused entry to a park by a sign reading "No dogs or Chinese allowed" is based on the real-life Huangpu Park in Shanghai. Known as the "Public Garden" during the period of the film's setting, it was catered specifically to the non-Chinese population of Shanghai's International Settlement, and was seen to typify the Chinese "century of humiliation".

=== Filming ===
The film was shot mostly at the Golden Harvest studios in Kowloon, with some limited exterior filming in Macau. The park gate sequence was shot at Luís de Camões Garden.

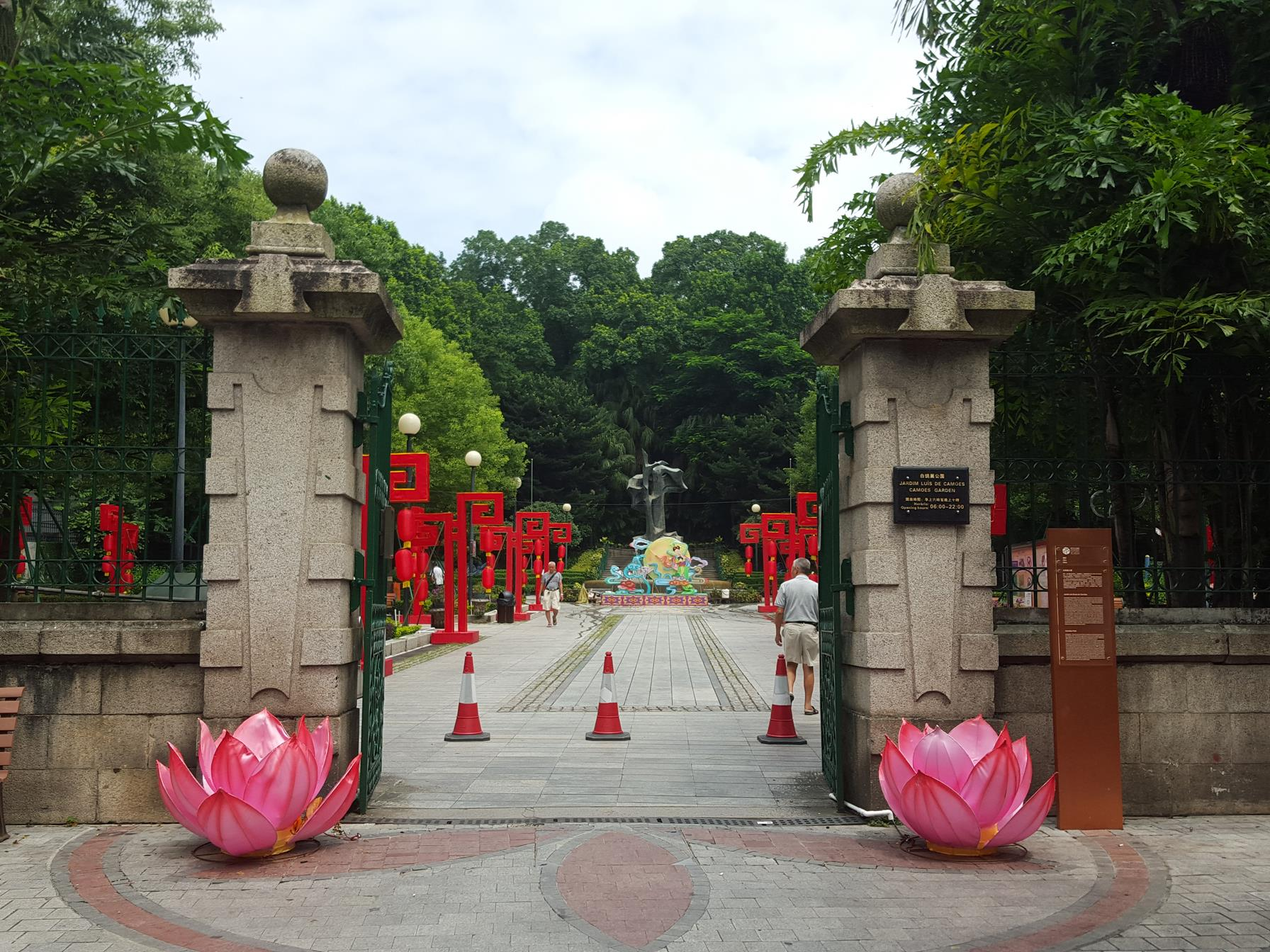
The entrance to Luís de Camões Garden in 2016.

Lee was not a fan of the director or his direction. According to Jackie Chan, he saw Lo and Lee get into a verbal altercation that nearly went physical. Lo hid behind his wife who was then able to calm Lee down. The experience led Lee to direct his follow up film, The Way of the Dragon, himself.

As was the norm in Hong Kong films for the time, the film was shot MOS (without live sync sound) and all dialogue and sound effects were dubbed in later.

== Titles ==
The original Chinese title of Fist of Fury, translated literally, means 'Jingwu Tradition'. Jingwu or Chin Woo (精武), translated literally, means 'mastering martial art'.

Fist of Fury was accidentally released in the U.S. under the title The Chinese Connection. That title was a means of tapping the popularity of another film, The French Connection (starring Gene Hackman), released in the U.S. in 1971. That title was intended to be used for the U.S. release of another Bruce Lee film, The Big Boss, which also involved drug smuggling. However, the U.S. titles for Fist of Fury and The Big Boss were accidentally switched, resulting in Fist of Fury being released in the U.S. under the title The Chinese Connection until 2005, while The Big Boss was released as Fists of Fury.

Chinese title	Original English title	Year	Mistaken release title (a.k.a. (Note: also known as (a.k.a.)))	Intended release title
唐山大兄 Tong^{4} Saan^{1} Daai^{6} Hing^{1}, "Chinese Elder Brother"	The Big Boss	1971	Fists of Fury	The Chinese Connection
精武門 Zing^{1} Mou^{2} Mun^{4}, "Chin Woo Tradition"	Fist of Fury	1972	The Chinese Connection	Fists of Fury

== Release ==
The film was released on 22 March 1972 in Hong Kong by Golden Harvest, and first released in the United States on 7 November 1972 in New York before Lee's first major film, The Big Boss, was released there.

In Japan, the film was released on 20 July 1974. Several scenes in the Japanese version were censored due to Raymond Chow's concerns over how the film's anti-Japanese sentiments would be received by Japanese audiences.

In 2021, Fist of Fury was dubbed in Noongar, an Indigenous Australian language. It was the first film to be dubbed in any Indigenous language of Australia.

=== Home media ===
Media Asia UK distributor Hong Kong Legends has released this film as a "Special Collector's Edition" and a "Platinum Edition". Bey Logan recorded two alternative commentaries for both releases. The usual process with re-releases on DVD is that the commentary is passed on to the next release. Logan decided to re-record his second commentary as he wanted to give it a new light, being an avid fan of this film. The re-dubbed theme song was played by Mike Remedios. Bey Logan had previously done a commentary track for the Media Asia Megastar DVD release, which is almost word for word the same as the commentary he did for Hong Kong Legends years later. Donnie Yen did the Cantonese language commentary on the same Megastar DVD.

In the United Kingdom, the film was watched by 600,000 viewers on Channel 5 in 2009, making it the year's most-watched foreign-language film on Channel 5.

== Reception ==
=== Box office ===
Upon its Hong Kong release, Fist of Fury grossed HK$4,431,423, beating the previous box office record set by Lee's The Big Boss in the previous year. During its initial run, it grossed more than US$5 million in Southeast Asia and US$15,000,000 (equivalent to $115,000,000 in 2025) across Asia.

In the United States and Canada, the film topped the box office in June 1973, and earned US$3.4 million in distributor rentals by the end of 1973, equivalent to an estimated box office gross revenue of approximately $12,000,000 (equivalent to $87,000,000 in 2025). Upon its July 1973 release in South Korea, the film sold 317,780 tickets in the capital city of Seoul. The film was also a success in the United Kingdom, where it released on 19 July 1973, a day before Lee's death. In France, it became the 12th highest-grossing film of 1974 (below two other Lee films in the top ten, Enter the Dragon and Way of the Dragon), with 3,013,676 ticket sales. In Spain, the film sold 2,034,752 tickets.

In Japan, despite the film's negative portrayal of Japanese villains, the film went on to be a surprise blockbuster in the country. Most Japanese audiences did not identify with the Japanese villains who they perceived as "unreal" and "stupid" but instead identified with Lee's "Chinese warrior" spirit, which reminded them of the bushido spirit depicted in older Samurai cinema. Fist of Fury became the year's seventh highest-grossing film in Japan, with ¥600,000,000 (equivalent to ¥1,400,000,000 in 2024) in distributor rental earnings.

Against a tight budget of $100,000, the film went on to gross an estimated US$100 million worldwide (equivalent to approximately $770 million adjusted for inflation), earning 1,000 times its budget. It was the highest-grossing Hong Kong film up until Lee's The Way of the Dragon (1972).

=== Critical response ===
Upon release in Asia, a review for Variety magazine in November 1972 called it a "Naive Hong Kong-made meller, of little U.S. commercial appeal" despite the "charm of Lee's invincible heroics." The reviewer felt that it was an "exuberant novelty act" unlikely to find Western appeal, but that Lee's "aggressive boyish charm" could "prove appealing to U.S. femmes."

Upon release in North America, John Gillett of the Monthly Film Bulletin reviewed a 106 minute dubbed version of the film in May 1973. Gillett commented on Bruce Lee, stating that he had "somewhat rudimentary and charmless acting style (all curled lips, sinister glances and clenched fists), but he performs his main function—that of keeping the action going through a series of furious karate fights—with considerable aplomb and proves as adept with his feet as with his fists." While finding the story "extremely naive" and that the "anti-Japanese bias is more rather more pronounced" while the fight sequences "are staged with tremendous vigour (and a judicious use of slow-motion)" concluding that "the production values are only moderate, with a rather uneasy fusion of studio interiors and real street locations, and the English dubbing is unusually inept."

On review aggregator Rotten Tomatoes, the film has an aggregated review score of 83% based on 18 critic reviews, with an average rating of 6.4/10. On Metacritic, the film holds a weighted average score of 68 out of 100 based on four critics, indicating "generally favorable reviews".

The film may have been the only one which Mao Zedong watched three times.

== Sequels and remakes ==
The film spawned three sequels: One starring Jackie Chan titled New Fist of Fury (1976), followed by Fist of Fury II (1977), Fist of Fury III (1979), and the South Korean spin-off Last Fist of Fury (1979).

The film also has comedy called Fist of Fury 1991 (1991), and a loose remake titled Fist of Legend (1994) starring Jet Li. A year after, the film spawned the television series Fist of Fury (1995) starring Donnie Yen as Chen Zhen. Donnie Yen reprised his role as Chen Zhen on the show’s 15th anniversary in Legend of the Fist: The Return of Chen Zhen (2010).

== See also ==
- Bruce Lee filmography
