= Bruce Lee Fights Back from the Grave =

- American theatrical release poster
- Hangul: 아메리카 방문객
- Hanja: 아메리카 訪問客
- Lit.: Visitor to America
- RR: Amerika bangmungaek
- MR: Amerik'a pangmun'gaek
- Directed by: Lee Doo-yong
- Written by: Hong Ji-Un
- Produced by: Kwak Jeong-Hwan
- Starring: Jun Chong; Deborah Dutch; Anthony Bronson; Sho Kosugi; Bae Soo-Cheong; Kim Moon-Joo
- Cinematography: An Chang-Bok
- Edited by: Hyeon Dong-Chun
- Music by: Kim Hee-Kap
- Production companies: Hap Dong Films Co., Ltd
- Release date: June 12, 1976
- Running time: 96 minutes
- Country: South Korea
- Language: Korean

Bruce Lee Fights Back from the Grave, originally released as Visitor of America (Korean: 아메리카 방문객), is a 1976 Bruceploitation supernatural martial arts film starring tae kwon do instructor Jun Chong (credited as 케리・郑 Ke-li Chong in the original South Korean version and as Bruce K. L. Lea in the English-dubbed and altered American edit). The film was directed by Lee Doo-yong, though persistent misinformation claims that the movie was directed by Italian horror director Umberto Lenzi.

== Plot overview ==
The opening sequence (which was filmed separately and added to the original South Korean film when the film was dubbed into English) shows Bruce Lee (played by an unknown imitator), leaping from his grave after it is struck by lightning. While this and the title imply a story involving Bruce Lee returning from the afterlife in order to do battle, the rest of the movie revolves around a plot that has nothing to do with Bruce Lee. Instead, it deals with Wong Han, a Korean man trying to discover the truth behind the death of his brother, Han Ji-Hyeok. He travels to Los Angeles and allies himself with a woman named Suzanne. Han is harassed by a number of petty criminals and thugs in his attempt to find out the truth about his brother. Eventually, he begins to suspect that Ji-Hyeok is still alive and involved in a criminal racket.

== Cast ==
- Jun Chong (credited as 케리・郑 Ke-li Chong / Bruce K. L. Lea) as Wong Han
- Deborah Dutch as Susanne
- Sho Kosugi as Suzuki

== Regional differences ==
The version of the film seen on both the U.K. and U.S. VHS and DVD comes from an American edit of an English dub that was prepared in Hong Kong.

Although the film was released in South Korea in 1976, it is unknown as to whether or not the film had a release in Chinese theaters.

The music score for the English-language version contains music lifted from the soundtracks to Rocky and Rollercoaster, two films not released until after the South Korean release date of this film. The sound effects on this version are typical of those often found in Hong Kong martial arts films at the time, rather than the sort that were heard in South Korean films.

The script for the English dub makes repeated references to the Asian characters being Chinese, when the visual evidence indicates that they are Korean.

The American distributors added the infamous "Bruce Lee" opening sequence.

== See also ==
- List of Hong Kong films
- List of martial arts films
