= Enter the Game of Death =

1978 South Korean-Hong Kong film by Joseph Velasco

Enter the Game of Death 死亡魔塔
- Theatrical release poster
- Directed by: Nam Seok Hoon; Joseph Velasco
- Written by: Her Jin
- Produced by: Kim Tae-Soo; Robert Jeffery
- Starring: Bruce Le; Bolo Yeung; Yeo Su-jin; Nick Cheung Lik; Nam Seok-hun; Lee Hoi Sang
- Cinematography: Jin Young-ho
- Edited by: Hyeon Dong-chun
- Music by: Jeong Min-seob
- Production companies: Tae Chang Enterprises Co. PT Insantra
- Distributed by: Cinematic
- Release dates: 3 November 1978 (South Korea); February 1980 (U.S.); 7 May 1981 (Hong Kong)
- Running time: 89 minutes
- Countries: South Korea; Hong Kong
- Languages: Korean; Cantonese

Enter the Game of Death (Chinese: 死亡魔塔; pinyin: Sǐ wáng mó tǎ; Jyutping: sei2 mong4 mo1 taap3; lit. 'Tower of Death') is a 1978 martial arts film directed by Joseph Velasco. Bolo Yeung also stars as the character Yang San being beaten first in the film.

== Plot ==
There is a mysterious Chinese document that is hidden in the Tower of Death, and evil Japanese occupiers want to get their hands on it. Meanwhile, a Chinese fighter named Mr. Ang (Bruce Le) is training in the forest, only to be challenged by several Japanese fighters as well as one of the main Japanese henchmen Bolo (Bolo Yeung). He defeats the other fighters, but flees from Bolo when he pulls out a sword. Mr. Ang and Bolo meet again in a wrestling ring, where Mr. Ang once again defeats Bolo.

Mr. Ang's victory impresses the Japanese, who want to hire him to go to the Tower of Death. However, Mr. Ang is a Chinese nationalist and refuses. This leads to Mr. Ang being challenged by another group of Japanese fighters in another forest, with Mr. Ang once again reigning victorious. Shortly afterwards, Mr. Ang discovers that a woman he thought was working for the Japanese is actually an undercover Chinese agent. They make a plan to retrieve the document from the Tower of Death.

They arrive at the Tower of Death and Mr. Ang enters the tower to encounter each of the following Tower Guardians:

- A Shaolin Monk armed with small metal balls and butterfly swords – 1st Floor Guardian
- A snake-style kung-fu shih-fu who uses both lives snakes and snake venom as weapons – 2nd Floor Guardian
- A sensei of both nunchaku and karate who is the second oldest one – 3rd Floor Guardian
- A possessed shih-fu of both bōjutsu and Tiger-style kung-fu who attacks when a red lamp is turned on, and a shih-fu of the Shaolin arts who is the most elderly. – 4th Floor Guardians
- A brute who fights using Bear-style kung-fu – 5th Floor Guardian

However Mr. Ang discovers that the document is not in the tower.

== Cast ==
- Bruce Le - Ang
- Yeo Su Jin - Lisa
- Kim Ki-Beom - Boss Chan
- Yeo Seong - Shai Yu
- Michael B. Christy - Keegan
- Park Dong Yong - Kawasaki
- Bolo Yeung - Yang See
- Sim Sang Hyeon - Wang Chun-Chan
- Lee Hoi Sang - First boss
- Nick Cheung Lik - Second boss with nunchakus
- Chiu Chi-ling - Third boss in red room
- Nam Seok Hoon - Fourth boss in red room
- Kim Wang Kuk - Fifth boss in top
- Samuel Walls

== Reception ==
The Video Vacuum gave the film two-and-a-half stars and said: "But it's Bruce Le who kicks the most ass in his fight scenes. Le has a lot more charisma than any of the Bruce Lee imitators and his considerable screen presence makes what would have otherwise been a lackluster action flick worth watching; making Enter the Game of Death a hair or two better than most Bruceploitation flicks."

In a double review on City on Fire, Joseph Kuby gave the film 4/10 and said: "Guaranteed, it's not really as good as some of the Bruce Li movies (e.g. The Chinese Stuntman, The Gold Connection a.k.a. Iron Dragon Strikes Back, The Lama Avengers a.k.a. The Three Avengers) nor is at as good as the official Game Of Death movies, but nonetheless Enter The Game Of Death has its moments and then some!" Joe909 gave the film 2/10 and said: "This movie proves yet again that Bruce Le sucks, and was the worst "fake Bruce" of them all. Even Dragon Lee had some charm, compared to him. The reason behind Le's loathsomeness is the audacious levels of "action" he and his producers packed into each of his movies; plot, character development, and even dialog were cast aside whenever possible and replaced by unending kung-fu battles. At least Bruce Le was a good martial artist, with some impressive kicks, but the guy just looks too goofy with his overdone "Bruce Lee" expressions and mannerisms."

Comicbookandmoviereviews.com gave the film a C+ and said: "All in all 'Enter the Game of Death' is a film for die hard fans of this genre only. The plot is nigh on non-existent. The fights are fairly so-so by and large. Bruce and Bolo did give the overall production that extra added star power needed. But at the end of the day this flick was more Ka-rap than Ka-pow!"
