= Bruce Lee: The Man, The Myth =

1976 Hong Kong film by Ng See-yuen

- Film poster
- Directed by: Ng See-yuen
- Written by: Ng See-yuen
- Produced by: Pau Ming
- Starring: Ho Chung-tao; Unicorn Chan; Alan Chui Chung-San; Chiu Chi-ling; Mars; Lee Hoi-sang; Fung Hak-on; Fung Ging-man
- Cinematography: Chen Wing
- Edited by: Mike Harris; Poon Hung; Sung Ming
- Music by: Stanley Chow
- Distributed by: Eternal Film Company
- Release date: 28 October 1976
- Running time: 98 minutes
- Country: Hong Kong
- Language: Mandarin

Bruce Lee: The Man, The Myth (Chinese: 李小龍傳奇, also known as Bruce Lee: The True Story) is a 1976 Hong Kong semi-biographical martial arts film starring Ho Chung-tao (Bruce Li) and directed by Ng See-yuen. The film was released in Hong Kong on 28 October 1976.

== Plot ==
The film chronicles Bruce Lee's life beginning with Lee leaving Hong Kong to go to the University in Seattle. Most of the benchmarks of Lee's later life (cast in Green Hornet television series, marriage to Linda Lee, stardom in Hong Kong, death) are covered, with a somewhat less tenuous relationship to the truth than in previous Lee biopics.

== Cast ==
- Ho Chung-tao – Bruce Lee
- Unicorn Chan – Himself
- Alan Chui Chung-San – One of Bruce Lee's students (also a stunt double for Bruce Li)
- Sham Chin-bo – Bruce Lee's friend in San Francisco
- Chiu Chi-ling – Mr. Chan
- Fung Ging-man – Lee Sifu
- Mars – Charlie
- Fung Hak-on – Challenger to Bruce Lee on the set of Enter the Dragon
- Lee Hoi-sang – Challenger to Bruce Lee on the set of Enter the Dragon
- Yuen Biao – Challenges Bruce Lee on the set of Enter the Dragon (also a stunt double for Bruce Li)
- Carl Scott – One of Bruce Lee's young students
- Wong Mei – Extra
- Fong Yuen – Fortune teller
- Lau Kwok-shing – Bad guy extra Enter the Dragon
- Leung Siu-cheng – Master beaten on street
- David Chow – Murayaki
- Lynda Hirst – Linda Lee
- Ip Chun – Ip Man, Bruce Lee's Wing Chun Sifu
- Roberta Ciappi – Daughter of Italian Mobster
- Donnie Williams – Karate Thug
- Siu Yuk-lung – Extra
- Richard Cheung Kuen – Student
- Chung Chaan-chi
- Gam Tin-chue

== Production ==
Linda Lee was played by Lynda Hirst, an English woman who was an army wife stationed in Hong Kong at the time of the filming. The director, having searched unsuccessfully for some time for a suitable 'Linda Lee' among available actresses, came across Lynda Hirst whilst out shopping in a local market and remarked on her resemblance to the late star's wife. On learning she was a 'Westerner' he immediately cast her in the (small) role. Lynda's real life sons can also be seen, very briefly, in the movie as Lee's children.

== Release ==
On 22 May 2000, DVD was released by Mia in the United Kingdom in Region 2. Two years later, Martial Arts Films Box Set DVD was released on 23 December 2002, at a 4 disc set that includes Black Friday, Legacy of Rage, and Rumble in Hong Kong. In the United States the film has been released on DVD several times due to it being in the public domain.

== Reception ==
In his three part Bruceploitation essay for Impact Magazine, Dean Meadows writes: "This was a bigger and better production, providing a larger budget, international locations and the name Ho Chung Tao on the opening credits. Upon its release, earlier, scandalous elements of the exploitational deluge had all but disappeared. Overlong scenes of the Little Dragon "in action" with Betty Ting Pei were absent from the production and the full contact fury that people had been waiting to see from a Bruce Lee bio-pic was finally realised. Every director can of course be afforded a little artistic license and whilst a number of fight scenes were completely fictionalised, Ng See Yuen had undoubtedly created a fitting tribute to the memory of the undisputed "King of Kung Fu". With first class choreography, Ho Chung Tao mirrored the Little Dragon in a number of standout fights."

The Time Out Film Guide, for example: "Numbingly unimaginative and exploitative biography. Would you trust a film that opens on a '70s street scene and captions it 'Hong Kong 1958'?"

Joseph Kuby gave the film 7 out of 10 and said: "Missed opportunity on behalf of the filmmakers to add some depth to the film if they took the film more seriously (i.e. make it as credible as it is incredible), but still a fun effort that should please Bruce Lee fans and chop-socky aficionados who don't seem to mind watching films where a star is exploited for the gain of big bucks and shallow entertainment - though having said that there's much better in that regard (especially within the realm of Bruceploitation fare...or really farce)!"
