= Enter the Dragon =

1973 film by Robert Clouse

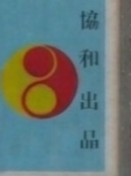
- Hong Kong film poster (Note: Poster cutout: A Concord Productiondistributed by GH to Hong Kong Poster cutout (logo))
- Traditional Chinese: 龍爭虎鬥
- Simplified Chinese: 龙争虎斗
- Literal meaning: Dragon Fights, Tiger Struggles
Transcriptions
Standard Mandarin
- Hanyu Pinyin: Lóng Zhēng Hǔ Dòu
- Wade–Giles: Lung^{2} Chêng^{1} Hu^{3} Tou^{4}
Yue: Cantonese
- Yale Romanization: Lùhng Jāng Fú Dau
- Jyutping: Lung4 Zang1 Fu2 Dau3
- Directed by: Robert Clouse
- Written by: Michael Allin (Note: Lee rewrote a significant portion of Allin's script without receiving an onscreen credit.)
- Produced by: Fred Weintraub; Paul Heller; Raymond Chow
- Starring: Bruce Lee; John Saxon; Ahna Capri; Bob Wall; Shih Kien; Jim Kelly
- Cinematography: Gilbert Hubbs
- Edited by: Kurt Hirschler; George Watters; Peter Cheung
- Music by: Lalo Schifrin
- Production companies: Sequoia Pictures; Concord Production Inc.; Warner Bros.
- Distributed by: Golden Harvest (China and Hong Kong); Warner Bros. (International)
- Release dates: 26 July 1973 (Hong Kong); 19 August 1973 (United States)
- Running time: 102 minutes
- Countries: Hong Kong; United States
- Languages: English; Cantonese
- Budget: $850,000
- Box office: $400 million

Enter the Dragon, in full titled Enter the Dragon: The Deadly Three, is a 1973 martial arts film directed by Robert Clouse and written by Michael Allin. The film stars Bruce Lee, John Saxon, Ahna Capri, Bob Wall, Shih Kien, and Jim Kelly. Enter the Dragon was Bruce Lee's final completed film appearance before his death on 20 July 1973 at the age of 32. An American-Hong Kong co-production, the film premiered in Hong Kong on 26 July 1973, six days after Lee's death, and in Los Angeles on 19 August 1973.

Enter the Dragon grossed an estimated $400 million worldwide (equivalent to an estimated $2 billion adjusted for inflation as of 2022) against a budget of $850,000. It is the most successful martial arts film ever and is widely regarded as one of the greatest martial arts films of all time. In 2004, it was selected for preservation in the United States National Film Registry by the Library of Congress as being "culturally, historically, or aesthetically significant". Among the first films to combine martial arts action with spy film elements and the emerging blaxploitation genre, its success led to a series of similar productions combining the martial arts and blaxploitation genres. The film's themes have generated scholarly debate about the changes taking place within post-colonial Asian societies following the end of World War II.

Enter the Dragon is also considered one of the most influential action films of all time, with its success contributing to mainstream worldwide interest in the martial arts as well as inspiring numerous fictional works, including action films, television shows, action games, comic books, manga, and anime.

== Plot ==
Lee, a martial artist and instructor from the Shaolin temple, is approached by British intelligence agent Braithwaite, who asks for his help in an undercover mission to investigate Han, a suspected crime lord, who was one of the students in the Shaolin temple.

Since Han's island is only partly in British jurisdiction, they are unable to conduct any formal investigations into Han's involvement in drug trafficking and prostitution. Han's only connection to the outside world is his martial arts school, where he holds a tournament that invites fighters from across the world to compete. Lee agrees to help Braithwaite, believing his efforts will redeem the honor of the Shaolin temple that was tarnished by Han. His mission is to gather evidence that will prove Han's involvement in illegal activities, which will prompt the authorities to raid the island. While Lee will be mostly be on his own and unarmed during this mission, Braithwaite informs him that they have planted a covert agent on the island, Mei-Ling, whom they have lost contact with. Shortly before his departure, Lee also learns that Han's bodyguard O'Hara is responsible for the death of his sister Su-Lin.

Joining Lee are other competitors, including Roper, an American playboy and gambler who is indebted and on the run from the mob; Williams, an African American activist who is on the run after defending himself against racist police officers in Los Angeles; and Parsons, an arrogant and overconfident New Zealander. They are all taken from Hong Kong harbour to Han's island on a motorised junk; on the way, Lee humiliates Parsons in return for abusing one of the crew.

On the evening of their arrival, all of the tournament competitors attend a banquet, where Han himself appears and greets them. Lee spots Mei-Ling among Han's entourage. After the banquet, Han's assistant Tania goes to each of the competitor's rooms to offer them girls for the night. Williams chooses several women, while Roper chooses Tania as a mutual attraction grows between them. Lee chooses Mei Ling, who is able to brief him on the island and what's been happening. Mei-Ling has been unable to escape Han's observation in the palace, but lets Lee know that the girls are slowly disappearing over time.

On the first day of the tournament, Parsons is selected to fight Williams. Williams defeats him easily, and Parsons is never seen again. Roper is selected to fight Liu, one of the other visitors, and also defeats him.

That night, Lee stealthily searches the island that night for evidence and finds a secret entrance to an underground compound base where drugs are being manufactured and tested on unwitting prisoners. He runs into Han's guards but takes them down and flees before they can identify him. Lee is seen by Williams, who is outside for fresh air and practice, despite rules against being outside after night. The next morning, Han warns the competitors about wandering out of their rooms at night. He punishes his guards for their inability to fulfill their duties by leaving them to be killed by Bolo, his musclebound enforcer. After the execution, the competition resumes as Lee is called to his first match against O'Hara. Lee easily overwhelms O'Hara, who attempts to attack Lee with broken glass bottles in retaliation; ignoring Han's furious orders to stand down. This leads to Lee killing O'Hara, thus avenging Su-Lin's death. An embarrassed Han ends the day's competition after stating that O'Hara's treachery has disgraced them.

Later, Han summons Williams into his office and accuses him of attacking the guards the previous night. Williams denies this and demands to leave the island. He is able to fight off Han's men, but Han himself attacks Williams and beats him to death, revealing a metal prosthetic left hand. Han takes Roper on a tour of his underground base and invites him to be his representative for his illegal operations in the United States. Han also implicitly threatens to imprison Roper with other martial artists who joined his tournaments in the past. Roper reluctantly accepts after Han drops the brutalized corpse of Williams into a pit of acid, hinting that Roper will face the same fate if he refuses to cooperate. The same night, Lee infiltrates the underground base again to gather sufficient evidence to warrant Han's arrest. He sends a telegram message to Braithwaite, but the island's security alarms go off and he is discovered. After a prolonged battle with Han's guards, Lee is trapped by Han and imprisoned.

The next morning, Braithwaite receives Lee's telegram and orders a raid on the island. Han commands Roper to fight Lee in the main square of the tournament, but Roper refuses and Han has him fight Bolo instead. Roper beats Bolo after a gruelling battle, so Han orders all his men to attack and kill Lee and Roper. The island's prisoners, released by Mei-Ling, and the other invited martial artists aid Lee and Roper in fighting Han's guards in a giant melee. Amid the chaos, Han attempts to fight his way out to escape, only to have Lee corner him in his museum. Lee proves to be a superior fighter over Han, who resorts to using a spear and a bladed replacement for his prosthetic hand to fight Lee. He retreats into a room full of mirrors, which proves disorientating for Lee until he remembers his lessons at the Shaolin Temple. Smashing the mirrors to spoil Han's trickery, Lee faces down Han and kicks him into a mirror impaled by the spear, killing him.

An exhausted Roper sits down in the main square, looking at the aftermath of the melee, where Tania was killed. Lee emerges from his fight, and both men exchange a thumbs-up as the military arrives to take control of the island.

== Cast ==
- Bruce Lee as Lee
- John Saxon as Roper
- Jim Kelly as Williams
- Ahna Capri as Tania, Han's secretary
- Shih Kien as Han
  - Keye Luke as Han's voice (uncredited)
- Bob Wall as O'Hara, Han's bodyguard
- Angela Mao Ying as Su-lin, Lee's sister
- Betty Chung as Mei-ling, an undercover operative
- Geoffrey Weeks as Braithwaite, a British Intelligence agent
- Yeung Sze as Bolo, Han's enforcer
- Peter Archer as Parsons, an arrogant New Zealand martial artist and Williams' opponent
- Tony Liu as Liu, Roper's opponent
- Sammo Hung as Lee's opponent

Uncredited

- Roy Chiao as the Shaolin abbot
- Yuen Wah (Note: Yuen Wah also a stuntman and doubling for Bruce Lee in acrobatics.), Yuen Biao, and Phillip Ko as tournament fighters
- Jackie Chan, Lam Ching-ying, and Alan Chui Chung-San as henchmen
- Yuen Ting, Chung Fat, and Mars as henchmen executed by Bolo
- Tadashi Yamashita as O'Hara's trainer
- Pat E. Johnson as a thug on golf course
- Mang Hoi as a ship passenger

== Production ==
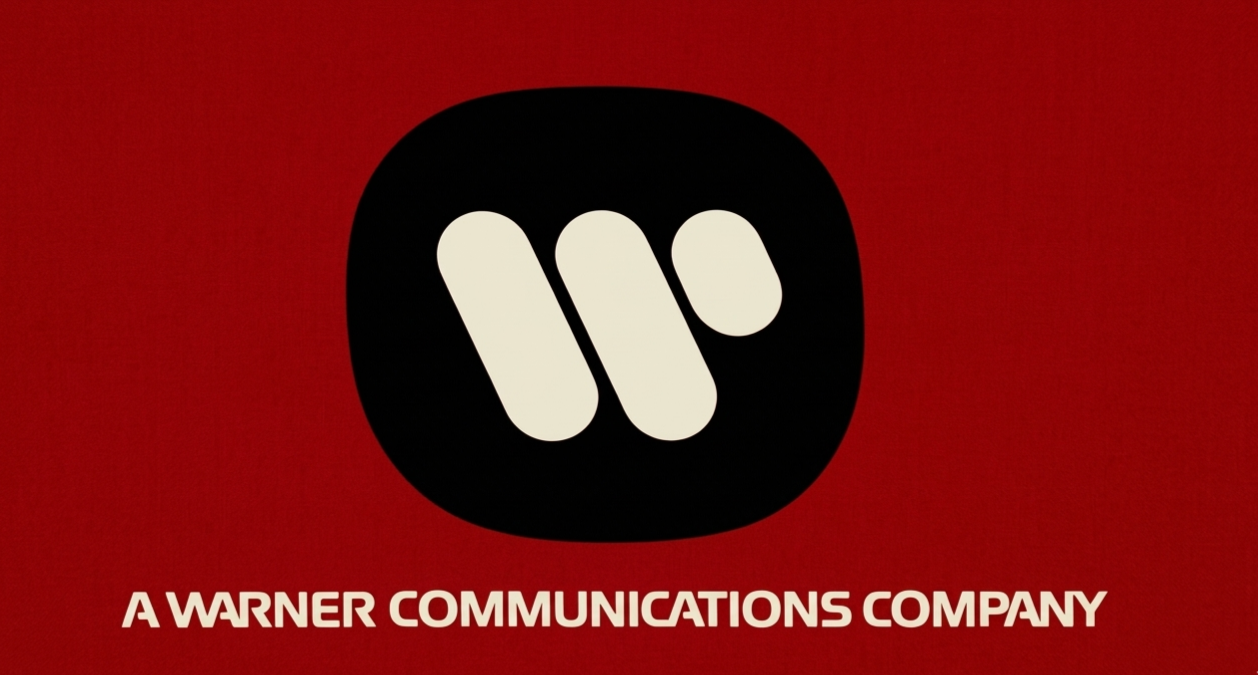
Opening Warner Bros.'s logo from the film

Opening credits of the film

=== Development ===
Due to the success of his earlier films, Warner Bros. started a co-production with Bruce Lee's Concord Production Inc., co-distribution to Raymond Chow's Golden Harvest. They brought in producers Fred Weintraub and Paul Heller's Sequoia Pictures (a production house affiliated with Warner Bros.). The film was produced on a tight production budget of $850,000. Fighting sequences were staged by Bruce Lee.

The screenplay title was originally named Blood and Steel. Bruce Lee came up with the name Enter the Dragon and was intending to use it for The Way of the Dragon but surrendered the title to Warner Bros. Heller produced a treatment inspired by the comic strip Terry and the Pirates and hired screenwriter Michael Allin to develop it into a screenplay. Allin conceived of the film as an homage to James Bond. The story features heroic protagonists who are Asian, White, and Black, as the producers wanted a film that would appeal to the widest possible international audience.

=== Pre-production ===
Lee and Allin did not get along, and Weintraub told Lee that he would fire Allin but did not actually do so. Lee perceived the film as a cheap B-movie that would serve as a transitional film to introduce his talents and style to Hollywood. Lee's role was originally conceived as a straightforward Chinese version of James Bond. Lee rejected this because of Bond's status as a symbol of British imperialism and convinced the producers to re-conceive of his character as a Shaolin monk. Lee insisted on re-titling the film Enter the Dragon, to considerable resistance from the studio.

The scene in which Lee states that his style is "Fighting Without Fighting" is based upon a famous anecdote involving the 16th century samurai Tsukahara Bokuden.

All of the actors were hired at low wages. Rod Taylor was first choice for playing the down-on-his-luck martial artist Roper. Director Robert Clouse had already worked with Taylor in the 1970 film Darker than Amber. However, Taylor was dropped after Bruce Lee deemed him to be too tall for the role. John Saxon, who was a black belt in Judo and Shotokan Karate (he studied under grandmaster Hidetaka Nishiyama for three years), became the preferred choice. During contractual negotiations, Saxon's agent told the film's producers that if they wanted him they would have to change the plot so that the character of Williams is killed instead of Roper. They agreed and the script was changed. In a six decade career, the character would become one of Saxon's best known roles.

Rockne Tarkington was originally cast in the role of Williams. However, he unexpectedly dropped out days before the production was about to begin in Hong Kong. Producer Fred Weintraub knew that karate world champion Jim Kelly had a training dojo in Crenshaw, Los Angeles, so he hastily arranged a meeting. Weintraub was immediately impressed, and Kelly was cast in the film. The success of Kelly's appearance launched his career as a star: after Enter the Dragon, he signed a three-film deal with Warner Bros. and went on to make several martial arts-themed blaxploitation films in the 1970s.

=== Filming ===
Jackie Chan has uncredited roles as various guards during the fights with Lee. However, Yuen Wah was Lee's main stunt double for the film, responsible for the gymnastics stunts such as the cartwheels and jumping back flip in the opening fight.

Sammo Hung also has an uncredited role in the opening fight scene against Lee at the start of the film.

Lee originally wanted to cast Chuck Norris as Han's bodyguard, O'Hara; Bob Wall was the second choice. A rumour surrounding the making of Enter The Dragon claims that Wall did not like Bruce Lee and that their fight scenes were not choreographed. However, Wall has denied this, stating he and Lee were good friends. In one of their fight scenes, Lee injured his hand on a shattered bottle held by Wall, which angered Lee.

The production hired prostitutes to play Han's harem. The visibility of their roles led the actresses to demand higher wages, which then led the stuntmen to consider striking, because they were paid less.

The film was shot on location in Hong Kong. In keeping with local film-making practices, scenes were filmed without sound: dialogue and sound effects were added or dubbed in during post-production. Bruce Lee, after he had been goaded or challenged, fought several real fights with the film's extras and some set intruders during filming. The scenes on Han's Island were filmed at a residence known as Palm Villa near the coastal town of Stanley. The villa is now demolished and the area heavily redeveloped around Tai Tam Bay where the martial artists were filmed coming ashore.

=== Soundtrack ===
Argentinian musician Lalo Schifrin composed the film's musical score. While Schifrin was widely known at the time for his jazz scores, he also incorporated funk and traditional film score elements into the film's soundtrack. He composed the score by sampling sounds from China, Korea, and Japan. The soundtrack has sold over 500,000 copies, earning a gold record.

== Release ==
=== Theatrical ===
Studio executives were impressed by the quality of the film and the earlier surprise success of Five Fingers of Death, which demonstrated a market for kung fu films. Enter the Dragon was heavily advertised in the United States before its release. The budget for advertising was over US$1 million. It was unlike any promotional campaign that had been seen before, and was extremely comprehensive. To advertise the film, the studio offered free Karate classes, produced thousands of illustrated flip books, comic books, posters, photographs, and organised dozens of news releases, interviews, and public appearances for the stars. Esquire, The Wall Street Journal, Time, and Newsweek all wrote stories on the film.

Enter the Dragon was one of the most successful films of 1973. Upon release in Hong Kong, the film grossed HK$3,307,536, which was huge business for the time, but less than Lee's previous 1972 films Fist of Fury and The Way of the Dragon.

In North America, the film was receiving offers of US$500,000 (equivalent to $3,600,000 in 2025) from American distributors by April 1973 for the distribution rights, several months before release. Upon its limited release in August 1973 in four theatres in New York, the film entered the weekly box office charts at number 17 with a gross of $140,010 (equivalent to $1,020,000 in 2025) in 3 days. Upon its expansion the following week, it topped the charts for two weeks. Over the next four weeks, it remained in the top 10 while competing with other kung fu films, including Lady Kung Fu, The Shanghai Killers and Deadly China Doll which held the top spot for one week each.

In October, Enter the Dragon regained the top spot in its eighth week. It sold 14.1 million tickets and grossed $25,000,000 (equivalent to $180,000,000 in 2025) from its initial American release, making it the year's fourth highest-grossing film in the market. It was repeatedly re-released throughout the 1970s, with each re-release entering the top five in the box office charts. The film's US gross had increased to $100 million by 1982, and more than $120 million (equivalent to $740 million adjusted for inflation) by 1998.

In the UK, the film initially monopolised several London West End cinemas for five weeks, before becoming a sellout success across Britain and the rest of Europe. In England, it grossed over $2.5 million. In Spain, it was the seventh top-grossing film of 1973, selling 2,462,489 tickets. In France, it was one of the top five highest-grossing films of 1974 (above two other Lee films, The Way of the Dragon at number 8 and Fist of Fury at number 12), with 4,444,582 ticket sales. In Germany, it was one of the top 10 highest-grossing films of 1974, with 1.7 million ticket sales. In Greece, the film earned $1,000,000 (equivalent to $7,300,000 in 2025) in its first year of release.

In Japan, it was the second highest-grossing film of 1974 with distributor rental earnings of ¥1,642,000,000 (equivalent to ¥3,749,000,000 in 2024). It was the highest-grossing film of all time in the Philippines. In South Korea, the film sold 229,681 tickets in the capital city of Seoul. In India, the movie was released in 1975 and opened to full houses; in one Bombay theatre, New Excelsior, it had a packed 32-week run. The film was also a success in Iran, where there was a theatre which played it daily up until the 1979 Iranian Revolution.

Against a tight budget of $850,000, the film grossed US$100,000,000 (equivalent to $730,000,000 in 2025) upon its initial 1973 worldwide release, making it one of the world's highest-grossing films of all time up until then. The film went on to have multiple re-releases around the world over the next several decades, significantly increasing its worldwide gross. The film went on to gross over $220 million internationally by 1981, making it the highest-grossing martial arts film of all time. It was reportedly still among the top 50 all-time highest-grossing films in 1990.

By 1998, it had grossed more than $300 million worldwide. As of 2001, it has grossed an estimated total of over $400 million worldwide, having earned more than 400 times its original budget. The film's cost-to-profit ratio makes it one of the most commercially successful and profitable films of all time. Adjusted for inflation, the film's worldwide gross is estimated to be the equivalent of around $2 billion as of 2022. It held the record for the highest-grossing low-budget film with a production budget under $1 million, up until its record was broken by Obsession in 2026.

=== Home media ===
Enter the Dragon has remained one of the most popular martial arts films since its premiere and has been released numerous times worldwide on multiple home video formats. For almost three decades, many theatrical and home video versions were censored for violence, especially in the West. In the UK alone, at least four different versions have been released. Since 2001, the film has been released uncut in the UK and most other territories. Most DVDs and Blu-rays come with a wide range of extra features in the form of documentaries, interviews, etc. In 2013, a second, remastered HD transfer appeared on Blu-ray, billed as the "40th Anniversary Edition".

In 2020, new 2K digital restorations of the theatrical cut and special edition were included as part of the Bruce Lee: His Greatest Hits box set by The Criterion Collection (under licensed from Warner Bros. Home Entertainment through the physical home media joint venture in US and Canada named Studio Distribution Services and Fortune Star Media Limited), which featured all of Lee's films, as well as Game of Death II. In 2023 Warner Bros. Home Entertainment released a 4K restored version with HDR and Dolby Atmos audio track on 4K Blu-Ray disc as part of the movies 50th anniversary.

== Reception ==
Upon release, the film initially received mixed reviews from several critics, including a favourable review from Variety magazine. The film eventually went on to be well received by most critics, and it is widely regarded as one of the best films of 1973. Critics have referred to Enter the Dragon as "a low-rent James Bond thriller", a "remake of Dr. No" with elements of Fu Manchu. J.C. Maçek III of PopMatters wrote, "Of course the real showcase here is the obvious star here, Bruce Lee, whose performance as an actor and a fighter are the most enhanced by the perfect sound and video transfer. While Kelly was a famous martial artist and a surprisingly good actor and Saxon was a famous actor and a surprisingly good martial artist, Lee proves to be a master of both fields."

Many acclaimed newspapers and magazines reviewed the film. Variety described it as "rich in the atmosphere", the music score as "a strong asset" and the photography as "interesting". The New York Times gave the film a rave review: "The picture is expertly made and well-meshed; it moves like lightning and brims with color. It is also the most savagely murderous and numbing hand-hacker (not a gun in it) you will ever see anywhere."

The film holds an 88% approval rating on the review aggregation website Rotten Tomatoes based on 78 reviews, with an average rating of 7.80/10. The site's critical consensus reads, "Badass to the max, Enter the Dragon is the ultimate kung-fu movie and fitting (if untimely) Bruce Lee swan song." On Metacritic, it has a weighted average score of 83 out of 100 based on reviews from 16 critics, indicating "universal acclaim". In 2004, the film was deemed "culturally significant" by the Library of Congress and selected for preservation in the National Film Registry.

Enter the Dragon was selected as the best martial arts film of all time, in a 2013 poll of The Guardian and The Observer critics. The film also ranks No. 474 on Empire magazine's 2008 list of The 500 Greatest Movies of All Time.

Enter the Dragon has been parodied and referenced in places such as the 1976 film The Pink Panther Strikes Again, the satirical publication The Onion, the Japanese game-show Takeshi's Castle, and the 1977 John Landis comedy anthology film The Kentucky Fried Movie (in its lengthy "A Fistful of Yen" sequence, basically a comedic, note for note remake of Dragon) and also in the film Balls of Fury. It was also parodied on television in That '70s Show during the episode Jackie Moves On with regular character Fez taking on the Bruce Lee role. Several clips from the film are comically used during the theatre scene in The Last Dragon. Lee's martial arts films were broadly lampooned in the recurring Almost Live! sketch Mind Your Manners with Billy Quan. Ram Gopal Varma directed the martial-arts film Ladki: Dragon Girl after being heavily inspired by the film.

In August 2007, the now-defunct Warner Independent Pictures announced that television producer Kurt Sutter would be remaking the film as a noir-style thriller entitled Awaken the Dragon with Korean singer-actor Rain. It was announced in September 2014 that Spike Lee would work on the remake. In March 2015, Brett Ratner revealed that he wanted to make the remake. In July 2018, David Leitch was in early talks to direct the remake. As of 2024, there are no further updates on this project.

Enter the Dragon has been cited as one of the most influential action films of all time. Sascha Matuszak of Vice called it the most influential kung fu film and said it "is referenced in all manner of media, the plot line and characters continue to influence storytellers today and the impact was particularly felt in the revolutionizing way the film portrayed African-Americans, Asians and traditional martial arts." Joel Stice of Uproxx called it "arguably the most influential kung fu movie of all time." Kuan-Hsing Chen and Beng Huat Chua cited its fight scenes as influential as well as its "hybrid form and its mode of address" which pitches "an elemental story of good against evil in such a spectacle-saturated way." Quentin Tarantino cited Enter the Dragon as a formative influence on his career.

According to Scott Mendelson of Forbes, Enter the Dragon contains spy film elements similar to the James Bond film series. Enter the Dragon was the most successful action-spy film to not be part of the James Bond film series; Enter the Dragon had an initial global box office comparable to the James Bond films of that era, and a lifetime gross surpassing every James Bond film up until GoldenEye. Mendelson argues that, had Bruce Lee lived after Enter the Dragon was released, the film had the potential to launch an action-spy film franchise starring Bruce Lee that could have rivalled the success of the James Bond franchise.

The film had an impact on MMA. In the opening fight sequence, where Lee fights Sammo Hung, Lee demonstrated elements of what would later become known as MMA. Both fighters wore what would later become common MMA clothing items, including kempo gloves and small shorts, and the fight ends with Lee utilising an armbar (then used in judo and jiu-jitsu) to submit Hung. According to UFC Hall of Fame fighter Urijah Faber, "that was the moment" that MMA was born.

The Dragon Ball manga and anime franchise, debuted in 1984, was inspired by Enter the Dragon, which Dragon Ball creator Akira Toriyama was a fan of. The title Dragon Ball was also inspired by Enter the Dragon and the piercing eyes of Goku's Super Saiyan transformation was based on Bruce Lee's paralysing glare.

Enter the Dragon inspired early beat 'em up brawler games. It was cited by game designer Yoshihisa Kishimoto as a key inspiration behind Technōs Japan's brawler Nekketsu Kōha Kunio-kun, released as Renegade in the West. Its spiritual successor Double Dragon also drew inspiration from Enter the Dragon, with the game's title being a homage to the film. Double Dragon also features two enemies named Roper and Williams, a reference to the two characters Roper and Williams from Enter the Dragon. The sequel Double Dragon II: The Revenge includes opponents named Bolo and Oharra.

Enter the Dragon was the foundation for fighting games. The film's tournament plot inspired numerous fighting games, such as the Tekken series, for example. The Street Fighter video game franchise, debuted in 1987, was inspired by Enter the Dragon, with the gameplay centered around an international fighting tournament, and each character having a unique combination of ethnicity, nationality and fighting style. Street Fighter went on to set the template for all fighting games that followed. The little-known 1985 Nintendo arcade game Arm Wrestling contains voice leftovers from the film, as well as their original counterparts. The popular fighting game Mortal Kombat borrows multiple plot elements from Enter the Dragon as does its movie adaptation.

== See also ==
- Bruce Lee filmography
