= Back in Action (1994 film) =

1994 film by Steve DiMarco and Paul Ziller

- Directed by: Steve DiMarco; Paul Ziller
- Screenplay by: Karl Schiffman
- Produced by: George Flak
- Starring: Billy Blanks; Roddy Piper; Bobbie Phillips; Nigel Bennett
- Cinematography: Gilles Corbeil
- Edited by: Marvin Lawrence
- Music by: Varouje Hagopian
- Production companies: Performance Pictures; Shapiro-Glickenhaus Entertainment
- Distributed by: Cineplex Odeon Films (Canada); MCA/Universal Home Video (U.S.)
- Release date: June 3, 1994; (Canada)
- Running time: 93 minutes
- Countries: Canada; United States
- Language: English

Back in Action is a 1994 Canadian-American action film directed by Steve DiMarco and Paul Ziller, starring Billy Blanks, Roddy Piper, Bobbie Phillips and Nigel Bennett. Blanks and Piper play contrasting types on a mission to take down a criminal cartel who threatens the former's sister, and killed the latter's police partner.

== Cast ==
- Billy Blanks as Billy
- Roddy Piper as Frank Rossi
- Bobbie Phillips as Helen Lewinsky
- Nigel Bennett as Kasajian
- Kai Soremekun as Tara
- Matt Birman as Chakka
- Damon D'Oliveira as Gantry
- Rob Stefaniuk as Jerry Gitano
- Sam Malkin as Lieutenant Burns
- Barry Blake as Wallace
- Kelly Fiddick as "Trick"
- Garry Robbins as Giant

== Production ==
The project started life as a vehicle for Canadian-based actor/producer Jalal Merhi. It was going to be a sequel to his 1992 film Talons of the Eagle (hence the sequel-styled title of Back in Action), and bring back the three stars from his 1993 offering TC 2000: Billy Blanks, Bobbie Phillips and Merhi himself. However, Merhi found his U.S. distributor and financier Shapiro-Glickenhaus Entertainment increasingly reluctant to work with him. Following some legal wranglings, Merhi was squeezed out of the project and replaced by Roddy Piper, while Blanks and Phillips remained on board.

Substituting Merhi's company Film One, SGE signed another Toronto outfit as its production partner, George Flak's Performance Pictures. Karl Schiffman, a friend of Flak's, was brought in and instructed to rewrite the script from scratch based on a stock buddy movie template, which he did in two weeks. Filming took place in the Toronto metropolitan area, starting on July 5, 1993, and concluding on August 13. Steve DiMarco was originally announced as the sole director, but he butted heads with SGE and was fired partway into the shoot to be replaced by Paul Ziller.

== Release ==
=== Theatrical ===
Back in Action opened in Canadian theaters on June 3, 1994, through Cineplex Odeon Films.

=== Home media ===
In the U.S., the film premiered on home video through MCA/Universal Home Video, which whom SGE had an output deal, on July 13, 1994. The film's British VHS preceded its domestic bow, arriving on March 9, 1994, from Guild Home Video.

== Reception ==
Back in Action has received mixed reviews. Rob Salem of The Toronto Star was most positive, calling it "[t]he exception to the rule" that low-budget Toronto action films lack in quality, and finding it far superior to Merhi's TC 2000. He judged that it was "inventively directed" and "often explosive", while Piper and Blanks "ma[de] a good team". He concluded that the film was "one of those rare times when a sequel is not only appropriate but almost required." The BBC's Radio Times called it "[a]n incredibly brutal film that boasts about one shoot-out or bone-breaking fight every ten minutes but, to its credit, it doesn’t take itself that seriously, and it’s sure to please action fans looking for some dumb, violent fun." Hal Erickson of AllMovie wrote that "[a]fter the usual 'I don't like you and you don't like me' palaver, Piper and Blanks combine their considerable self-defense skills to kick a lot of LaLa-land butt. It ain't Hamlet, but it's a lot of fun."

In his publication VideoScope, genre critic Joe Kane called the film "a nearly nonstop series of shoot-outs, chases, and punch-ups that, while energetically staged, grow too numbingly repetitious even for diehard action hounds." He deemed that "this exercise in kinetic brawn would have benefited from a bit more brain". Mike Mayo of The Roanoke Times and VideoHound's Video Premieres "[a] standard-issue buddy picture. Roddy Piper plays a cop who joins forces with martial arts favorite Billy Blanks as a Special Forces veteran to save Blanks' sister from gangsters. The fight choreography is cliched, though there are some scenes where Piper really cuts loose with full Wrestlemania craziness." Sight & Sound, the British Film Institute's magazine, assessed that "[m]id-range martial-arts star Blanks teams up with Piper for a by-numbers action vehicle". Contrary to the Toronto Star, TV Guide did not find it a meaningful improvement over Blanks' Merhi-produced films, calling it: "a disposable, direct-to-video action bloodbath from the creators of the substantively similar Talons of the Eagle and TC 2000."

== Follow-up ==
Schiffman was booked to write a treatment for a direct sequel, which came close to getting into production, but SGE instead opted to commission a spiritual successor starring Piper and Blanks from a different team. The result was the similar but narratively distinct Tough and Deadly. Flak did re-team with Piper on 1995's Jungleground for Norstar Entertainment.
