= Black Pearls (1991 film) =

1991 film by Ron Hulme

- Directed by: Ron Hulme
- Written by: Ron Hulme
- Story by: Ron Hulme (Created by); J. Steven Maunder (Created by); Jalal Merhi (Created by)
- Produced by: Jalal Merhi
- Starring: Jalal Merhi; Monika Schnarre; Lazar Rockwood; Bolo Yeung; Jamie Farr
- Cinematography: Mark Willis
- Music by: Nash the Slash; Gary Koftinoff (Black Pearls); Varouje Hagopian (Fearless Tiger)
- Production company: Film One
- Distributed by: Cineplex Odeon Films (Canada); Imperial Entertainment (U.S.)
- Release dates: April 19, 1991 (Canada); February 23, 1994 (U.S.)
- Running time: 91 minutes (Black Pearls); 88 minutes (Fearless Tiger)
- Country: Canada
- Language: English

Black Pearls is a 1991 Canadian martial arts film directed by Ron Hulme, and starring Jalal Merhi, Monika Schnarre, Lazar Rockwood, Bolo Yeung and Jamie Farr. Merhi stars as a college graduate who renounces his upper class lifestyle to learn martial arts in Hong Kong, and take down the local drug cartel responsible for the death of his brother. An international version, which received significant alterations, was released in 1994 under the title Fearless Tiger.

== Cast ==
- Jalal Merhi as Lyle Camille
- Monika Schnarre as Ashley
- Lazar Rockwood as Salamaar
- Jamie Farr as Sam Camille
- Bolo Yeung as Master on Mountain
- K. Dock Yip as Do Man
- Sonny Onoo as Peng
- Glenn Kwan as Boh
- Jean Frenette as Jacques
- Richard Plowden as Sheffield

== Production ==
=== Development ===
Black Pearls was the first project for Merhi and his newly formed company Film One, but took two years to finish as he was still trying to balance his film aspirations and his day job as a jeweler at the time. The pitch was concocted by Merhi, director Ron Hulme and Merhi's kung fu student, York University film school graduate J. Stephen Maunder.

=== Casting ===
Merhi approached Jamie Farr, with whom he shares Lebanese origins, while he was in the Toronto area for a play at the Stage West hotel theater. Locally raised fashion model Monika Schnarre made her feature debut with the film. Bolo Yeung's participation was not planned in advance, and was added during production.

Merhi also summoned a number of his friends from the North American martial arts scene. The film was originally going to co-star Billy Blanks. However, he withdrew shortly before filming, after getting the opportunity to feature in Tango & Cash. He would end up working with Merhi in Talons of the Eagle. Sonny Onoo was another longtime acquaintance, with whom Merhi had talked for years about filming something together. Bill Pickells was the producer's shotokan karate teacher. Merhi's main opponent was played by Glenn Kwan, a veteran Kenpō instructor from Barrie.

For the tournament that makes up the middle of the film, the main martial arts schools in Southern Ontario were invited to bring their best members, about fifty in all. In addition to Kwan, the tournament featured future UFC fighter Harold Howard and forms specialist Jean Frenette. American Gōjū-ryū figure Chuck Merriman, a mentor for Frenette and many others, played the referee.

=== Filming ===
Filming started on July 17 and lasted until September 3, 1989, mostly in the Toronto area. Some additional photography took place in Hong Kong. Merhi met Bolo Yeung through Gary Chau, a Chinese–Canadian student of Mo Chow who had his habits in the colony, while he was there to capture establishing shots. Merhi trained with Yeung and, using some of the money he had brought with him, quickly made a deal to add him to the film, although the latter would not do any fighting for a special appearance. He also wanted a woman on screen with him to soften his image. Merhi was eager to accommodate him and agreed.

The tournament scenes, although set in Hong Kong, were shot in Brampton, Ontario. Fights were choreographed by Merhi, Frenette and Mo Chow, who was Merhi's kung fu instructor. There were some legitimate knockouts and a few injuries such as a broken nose. Most of the interiors set in Hong Kong were also filmed in Canada. The motor chase (which is the climax of the 1991 version) called for a specially rigged car to be blown up on screen. However, it still had not been delivered three days after the agreed upon date. As it would be cheaper than waiting further, Merhi opted to destroy his own Mercedes on the spot. However, the road-ready vehicle could not be stripped down properly and errand debris flew perilously close to the crew when it was detonated.

The project was a disappointing experience for Merhi, as a result of his inexperience and people taking advantage of it. Some crew members put their own standing ahead of the film, for example by demanding the same master shot be redone several times, which was not practical on a physically demanding shoot. When Merhi asserted himself, this caused a rift with the director. Others made false promises, causing the planned budget of CAD$500,000 to be gone before photography had even been completed. Costs subsequently ballooned to CAD$1.6 million, most of it covered by Merhi.

== Release ==
=== Pre-release ===
The film was screened to industry professionals at the May 1990 Cannes Film Market and the February–March 1991 American Film Market.

=== Theatrical ===
Black Pearls opened in limited release in Toronto on April 19, 1991, courtesy of Cineplex Odeon Films. It stayed there for just two weeks, quickly followed by its video release. Merhi expressed his disappointment with the film's promotional campaign, which did not emphasize the film's recognizable actors.

=== Home media ===
==== Black Pearls ====
The film arrived on Canadian videocassette on the last week of May 1991 through Cineplex Odeon Video and MCA Home Video Canada. Abroad, it initially struggled to sell, and only wound up being distributed after the success of 1992's Tiger Claws.

==== Fearless Tiger ====
The film was extensively revamped to attract international sales. The soundtrack was remixed and a new score by Varouje Hagopian, drawing from his work on Tiger Claws, replaced the original. The film was re-edited to condense some subplots, while adding a new ending fight written and choreographed by Maunder. The title was changed to Fearless Tiger by Le Monde Entertainment which had acquired distribution rights from Transcontinental Pictures.

Imperial Entertainment released this new version in the U.S. on February 23, 1994, in the U.S., and three months later in the U.K. Image Entertainment also issued a LaserDisc on June 4, 1994. An English-language DVD appeared in the U.K. on March 4, 2002, courtesy of budget publisher Hollywood DVD. In the U.S., the film was part of a double feature with Ron Marchini's own drugs-and-karate flick Death Machines from discounters EastWest DVD, for which a retail source quotes a May 5, 2005, street date.

== Reception ==
Owing to its sparse release, the original Black Pearls version was not widely reviewed. Craig MacInnis of The Toronto Star focused on the film's "creative casting" of Jamie Farr and especially Monika Schnarre, who "save[d] Black Pearls from being another dreary chop-socky adventure". Reviewing the tape a few weeks later, his Star colleague Rob Salem was not as forgiving, describing the film as "very silly" and among "the worst Canadian cinema has to offer".

The enhanced Fearless Tiger was no better regarded. Halliwell's Film Guide lambasted a "[r]idiculous martial arts action movie, lacking any visible or aural merit; its star is not only inadequate but often incomprehensible — though, given the dialogue one can hear, that may be a blessing." Ballantine Books' Video Movie Guide dismissed it as "|t]oothless nonsense". British syndicated column Video view criticized the "nonsensical" plot, "appallingly dub[bed]" dialogue, an "a 'star' who is entirely devoid of charisma". Peter Dean of the British Film Institute's magazine Sight and Sound called the film "[s]tandard fare enlivened by the always watchable Bolo Yeung". Bill Palmer's Encyclopedia of Martial Arts Movies deemed the acting "amateur" and the story "stupid", but granted that "there are some decent fights."
