= Jalal Merhi =

Brazilian-born Lebanese-Canadian martial artist, actor and filmmaker (born 1957)

- Born: January 27, 1957 (age 69); Centenário do Sul, Paraná, Brazil
- Occupations: Film and television producer, actor, martial artist
- Years active: 1988–present

Jalal Merhi is a Brazilian-born Lebanese-Canadian martial artist, actor and filmmaker. As a competitor, he was a regular on the tournament scene in the late 1970s to mid 1980s. As a film and television producer, he owns the Film One company, and previously owned a studio located at the Donlands Theatre in Toronto.

== Early life ==
Merhi was born in Brazil to a family of Druze Lebanese expatriates working in the jewelry industry. He moved to Lebanon at age six, before moving again to Canada at age nineteen to study and to escape the Civil War. He initially spent time between Montreal and Toronto before permanently settling in the latter. In Canada, Merhi studied film and business. He is an alumn of Ryerson University and George Brown College, where he was discouraged to pursue a film career by one of his professors. He originally followed in his forebears' footsteps, operating JM Co., a Toronto branch of the family business which consisted of several shops and a manufacture.

== Martial arts career ==
Merhi started martial arts at the age of eleven. He was inspired by his grandfather, an amateur boxer whose training books he discovered, and his brother, a Taekwondo practitioner whose routines he emulated. His formal training, however, started at age fifteen with Beirut-based club Benzi, which was affiliated with the Japan Karate Association. While he stuck with Shotokan karate long enough to earn a black belt, he deemed the rigid training out of touch with the spirituality he sought from martial arts. His true interest lay in Chinese martial arts due to their emphasis on artistry and traditional weapons, but tuition in those disciplines was not widely available at the time. Within two months of moving to Canada, Merhi found Mo Chow's kung fu school in Toronto and started training there, primarily in the Choy Li Fut and Hung Gar styles. Crediting his karate background, Merhi says he became competitive in kung fu in about half a year.

Merhi originally competed in combat, open hand forms and weapons, but a hand injury suffered in late 1978 led him to withdraw from combat to focus on the later two categories. He found a particular niche in the weapons category, where he secured his first placing in just his second tournament in early 1977. Among career highlights, Merhi claims victories in such competitions as the Canada Cup Classic and the North American Open Weapons Championship, both in 1980.

Merhi also helped promote martial arts tournaments like the Canadian Karate Internationals, and later the Diamond Challenge, with his Shotokan teacher Bill Pickells. His jewelry company presented winners in major classes with a diamond-studded championship ring worth close to CDN$3000 (equivalent to CDN$8,500 in 2024), an attractive novelty on the burgeoning North American martial arts scene. It lured several name competitors from the U.S., such as Steve "Nasty" Anderson, Terrance "Tokey" Hill, Sonny Onoo, Cynthia Rothrock and Billy Blanks, several of which later appeared in his movies. Merhi's red sash granted him the authority to teach kung fu, and he once owned his own school in the Danforth–Greenwood neighborhood of Toronto.

== Kung fu films and Donlands years ==
Although he had pondered entering the world of film as early as 1979, Merhi's involvement with the industry began in earnest in 1986. Following a win in an Ontario tournament in 1986, he received an offer to play an ensemble role in a martial arts film, which led to another offer to double for a younger actor. The aspiring actor considered both offers, although neither was to his liking. When the financing for the first movie fell by the wayside, he entered talks to back it as well. Having thus gained inside knowledge of the film production chain, Merhi reasoned that he would be better served to launch his own production company and control his career.

Merhi established his company Film One in 1988 or 1989, depending on sources. His first completed film, Black Pearls, was not successful, with Merhi bearing the brunt of the financial burden. It still sold in Canada to Cineplex Odeon, whose Jeff Sackman helped him network and gain financing for a second picture, Tiger Claws, through Shapiro-Glickenhaus Entertainment (SGE). Thanks to SGE's distribution deal with MCA/Universal Home Video, the film found a wider audience, which Merhi saw as vindication after his inauspicious beginnings. Merhi's first two films were produced without any provincial or national subsidies. Later films relied on some of Canada's usual assistance programs, although a condescending rebuttal by a Telefilm Canada member, the country's main film support organization and an arbiter of taste within the industry, soured him so much that he resolved to succeed without them. Even in his heyday, Merhi stuck to a lean template, banking on his martial arts experience to limit superfluous coverage, and wrap his films within three weeks for budgets around CDN1 million—substantially less than the Canadian industry average—and grosses generally equaling three times that.

Thanks to Tiger Claws' success, its successors Talons of the Eagle and TC 2000 quickly gained financing, and Merhi brought in friend Billy Blanks as his co-star. When they proved successful, SGE decided to retain Blanks' services and go in a different direction, discarding all of Merhi's influences over the anticipated Talons of the Eagle sequel, which became an unrelated buddy movie starring Blanks and "Rowdy" Roddy Piper called Back in Action. An acrimonious split ensued. Still reeling from the loss of his SGE deal, Merhi regrouped and aligned his company with fledgling Le Monde Entertainment, an affiliate of Canadian major Alliance Communications. It afforded Merhi his highest budget yet for Expect No Mercy, which mixed fisticuffs with early CGI-based science fiction, although Le Monde president John Freme voiced limited belief in the long term prospects of martial arts vehicles. Echoing what had happened with Talons of the Eagle, Alliance offered a bigger budget to retool the intended Expect No Mercy 2 into a more mainstream, standalone picture, which Merhi would direct but not appear in. Merhi however, did make it into the finished film, Expect to Die, which came to fruition thanks to a rekindled partnership with former SGE executive Alan Solomon, now at his new company Amsell Entertainment. Amsell would provide sales and occasional production support for much of Merhi's later feature film production.

While branching out into other genres, Merhi kept trying to deliver his brand of fantasy-infused martial arts amidst changing market trends until the late 1990s. A true sequel to Talons of the Eagle was considered, but Blanks soon became unavailable as his agents cultivated a more wholesome image following his rise to fame as a fitness guru. Merhi found a home for a belated third installment of the Tiger Claws series at ambitious Canadian upstart Annex Entertainment in 2000, but that company was short-lived. In 2021 and 2022, the producer collaborated with genre film preservationists Vinegar Syndrome on premium Blu-ray reissues of his most popular films from this era.

=== Donlands Theatre studios ===
Displeased by the lack of professionalism of some of the producers he had encountered in his early work, Merhi decided to dedicate himself to full-time filmmaking. Against the advice of his entourage, he sold the majority of his business interests, as well as his share of a downtown Toronto building, to fund the next steps of his career and give his company its own studio. Film One had used the historic Donlands Theatre in East York as production headquarters during the making of Tiger Claws. Shortly after completion of that film in 1991, Merhi acquired the premises outright to build his soundstage there. He spent around $CDN 2.5 million on his new dwellings. Merhi remained in ownership of the space for the next eleven years, and many sets for Film One's subsequent productions were built inside. Film One's post-production facilities were also set up there, and further upgraded circa 1998. As of 2023, the studios still exist under different ownership.

=== Themes ===
Much of Film One's 90s catalogue was created in collaboration with writer and occasional director J. Stephen Maunders, one of Merhi's kung fu students and later a teacher of the sport himself. As such, their early films aspired to represent Chinese martial arts on a more cultural level, and to showcase their differences with the more casually known Japanese styles. Merhi opined that the true measure of his cinematic achievements would be a positive appraisal from fellow martial artists. This was exemplified by Bill Pickells, Mo Chow and John Atkinson's appearances as fictionalized versions of themselves in Tiger Claws, while the background of Cynthia Rothrock's fictional character echoed her real-life childhood in Scranton, Pennsylvania. French-Canadian publication Panorama Cinéma summed up Merhi's works as "self reflexive" martial arts films "made by fans, for fans".

Although Merhi's industriousness once earned him the label of "one-man Canadian movie-making industry" from a Toronto tabloid, his propensity to cast himself in flattering parts has led some reviewers to dismiss his productions as vanity films, with Canuxploitation.com, a website created by genre historian Paul Corupe, describing Film One as an "ignominious company". For his part, Merhi has cited his willingness to share the spotlight, having cast Bolo Yeung and Billy Blanks, until then best known for their supporting or villainous parts, in meaty protagonist roles. The latter himself credits Merhi for his rise to leading man status.

== Diversification ==
=== Mainstream projects ===
In the mid 90s, Merhi attempted to grow his company beyond the kung fu subgenre, and offer products attuned to broader entertainment trends. Amidst the erotic thriller boom of the period, he was in talks to produce one starring Anne Archer of Fatal Attraction fame. Merhi's name was also linked to TV heavyweights Michael Berk and Jay Firestone. Among his projects were a buddy film with Terry "Hulk" Hogan, a thriller with Yasmine Bleeth that Roger Vadim was at one point attached to direct, and a new version of Hercules whose filming would use his Middle Eastern connections. Merhi acknowledged difficulties in the realization of those loftier projects, as he experienced a "glass ceiling" and had to deal with "different crowds". While the aforementioned efforts did not proceed, he did manage to put together his vaunted Middle Eastern historical adventure in the form of 2005's Young Alexander, a romanticized Alexander the Great biopic made in collaboration with Ilya Salkind, producer of TV's Superboy. However that film, which was promoted as the first in a trilogy and considered by Merhi to be his proudest achievement, was beset by distribution problems, and was not widely released until 2023, when it was retitled Born to be Great: Alexander of Macedonia.

=== Further genre films ===
With his mainstream break not forthcoming, Merhi soldiered on with more modest movies. By the second half of the 90s however, many independent stores had been weeded out of the video rental market in favor of large chains that stocked fewer niche products such as Film One's. Merhi further rationalized his operations, paring down his trademark spiritual touches to focus on more grounded affairs shot on brisk schedules. They were often joint ventures with regional producers, and sometimes filmed back-to-back. One such film was 1997's Crisis, which has been billed as the first feature to use the city of Saskatoon as its principal shooting location.

The most successful of these later works were 2001's The Circuit and its sequel. While ostensibly martial art films like many of his earlier ones, they incorporated some Southern Californian locations and went for a grittier, more urban vibe, at the behest of their Los Angeles-based star Olivier Gruner. The first two installments were picked up by Blockbuster Video under their City Heat label, guaranteeing a wide viewership. However, the home video market was changing further, and soon even larger chains scaled back their operations, greatly limiting the commercial prospects of low budget independent action fare. Despite selling several films to distributor ThinkFilm, a new company co-founded by early supporter Jeff Sackman, Merhi's output went on to receive increasingly spotty releases, and the producer switched to reality television altogether. Thanks to the advent of streaming platforms and the lower production costs afforded by digital media, Merhi has expressed interest in reviving The Circuit in episodic form.

=== Reality TV ===
Merhi had dabbled with reality-based programming in the second half of the 1990s, co-producing a fashion magazine pilot intended for MTV, as well as an early video based on Billy Blanks' self-defense-based fitness program, then known as Karobics. The video was shelved due to trademark issues, and Blanks later rebranded his routine as Tae Bo under another production company. As the direct-to-video market stopped being sustainable, Merhi made reality television his main avenue, taking advantage of the genre's low costs and burgeoning demand from specialty channels. Perhaps his most notable effort in the field, the 2008 series Soccer Dreams saw young contestants vie for a spot at the Everton F.C. academy. It was picked up by the Fox Soccer Channel in the U.S. and broadcast internationally.

== Filmography ==
=== Film ===
Year	Film	Functioned as						Notes
Year	Film	Director	Producer	Writer	Fight coordinator	Actor	Role	Notes
1990	Black Pearls	No	Yes	Created by	Yes	Yes	Lyle Camille	Released in the U.S. in 1994 as Fearless Tiger
1991	Tiger Claws	No	Yes	No	Yes	Yes	Tarek Richards	
1992	Talons of the Eagle	No	Yes	No	Yes	Yes	Michael Reed	
1993	TC 2000	No	Yes	No	Yes	Yes	Niki Picasso	
1994	Operation Golden Phoenix	Yes	Yes	No	Yes	Yes	Mark Assante	
1994	Death Junction	No	Yes	No	None credited	Yes	Cameo only	
1995	Expect No Mercy	No	Yes	No	Also second unit director	Yes	Eric	
1996	Tiger Claws II	No	Yes	No	No	Yes	Tarek Richards	
1997	Expect to Die	Yes	Yes	No	No	Yes	Blake	
1997	Crisis	Yes	Yes	No	Yes	Yes	Cameo only	
2000	Tiger Claws III	No	Yes	No	No	Yes	Tarek Richards	
2000	Sometimes a Hero	Yes	Yes	No	No	No		Released in the U.S. in 2003 as Cold Vengeance
2001	Love Letters: A Romantic Trilogy	No	Yes	No	—N/a	No		
2001	G.O.D.: Guaranteed on Delivery	No	Yes	No	None credited	Yes	Ray Stanton	
2002	The Circuit	Yes	Yes	No	Yes	Yes	Bill	
2002	The Circuit 2: The Final Punch	Yes	Yes	No	Yes	Yes	Bill	
2006	Circuit III: Street Monk	Yes	Yes	Story by	No	Yes	Bill	Unreleased commercially in the U.S. Available via Film One's YouTube channel since 2022.
TBD	Blizhniy Boy: The Ultimate Fighter	Yes	No	Story consultant (uncredited)	No	No		Toronto scenes filmed in 2006; Not officially released
2013	Risk Factor	No	Yes	No	None credited	Yes	Alex Granger	Filmed in 2003 as Into the Heat
2023	Born to Be Great: Alexander of Macedonia	Yes	Yes	No	Yes	No		Filmed in 2004 as Young Alexander the Great. Available via Film One' YouTube channel since 2026.

=== Television ===
Year	Film	Functioned as						Notes
Year	Film	Director	Producer	Writer	Fight choreographer	Actor	Role	Notes
1996	21st Century Man	No	Yes	No	—N/a	No		Television pilot
2008	Soccer Dreams	Yes	Yes	Yes	—N/a	No		Also known as Football Dreams; 22 episodes
2009–16	The Conspiracy Show with Richard Syrett	Yes	Yes	No	—N/a	No		60 episodes
2020	Ruff Rescue: MASH Pet Clinic of LA	Yes	Yes	Yes	—N/a	No		13 episodes
2020	Botox Queen of NY	Yes	Yes	Yes	—N/a	No		13 episodes
2020	Ruff Rescue: The DogFather of Brooklyn	Yes	Yes	Yes	—N/a	No		7 episodes
2020	The Circuit	Yes	Yes	Yes	Unknown	Unknown		6 episodes
2021	Out of their Mind	Yes	Yes	No	—N/a	No		13 episodes

== Personal life ==
One of Merhi's sons, Nader "Marco" Merhi, is a visual artist and musician. A sports car enthusiast himself, he is also the uncle of race driver Roberto Merhi.

== Honors ==
=== Canadian Black Belt Hall of Fame ===
- Class of 2019
