= Sharon Brown (actress) =

American actress (born 1962)

- Born: January 11, 1962 (age 64)
- Other names: Sharon Blanks
- Occupation: Actress
- Spouse: Billy Blanks Jr. (div.)
- Children: 1
- Father: Johnny Brown

Sharon Brown (born January 11, 1962), also known as Sharon Catherine Blanks, is an American actress of stage, film, and television.

== Early life and education ==
Brown was born on January 11, 1962, and is the daughter of actor Johnny Brown, who portrayed Nathan Bookman on the 1970s sitcom Good Times. Her mother, June Brown, was a studio manager. Sharon graduated from Hollywood High School where she played Mame Dennis in the musical Mame and Ruth Sherwood in Wonderful Town. She has a brother, John Brown Jr.

== Career ==
Brown has worked frequently as a stage actress, including roles as Effie in both Broadway and touring productions of the musical Dreamgirls; as Violet in the musical Maggie Flynn; and as the narrator in versions of Joseph and the Amazing Technicolor Dreamcoat. She has also toured with productions of The Wiz, Rent and Jekyll & Hyde. Brown was nominated for a Helen Hayes Award in 1987 for Outstanding Lead Actress in a Non-Resident Production for her role in the touring version of Dreamgirls.

Film credits include A Chorus Line (1985), For Keeps (1988), Sister Act 2 (1993), What's Love Got to Do with It (1993), Blues Brothers 2000 (1998) and Introducing Dorothy Dandridge (1999). On television, Brown played the character Daisy on the CBS soap opera Love of Life in 1971, and she originated the role of Chantel on the NBC soap Generations from 1989 to 1990. She portrayed a young Louise in a 1981 flashback episode of The Jeffersons titled "And the Doorknobs Shined Like Diamonds". Other episodic television credits include Good Times, A Different World and The Fresh Prince of Bel-Air.

== Personal life ==
She married Billy Blanks Jr., the son of Tae Bo fitness personality Billy Blanks. They taught at fitness studios in Sherman Oaks, California, and developed a series of fitness videos. In 2014, Blanks pitched the program to Shark Tank and accepted a deal. They have an adopted son named Elijah. They divorced in 2016.

== Filmography ==
=== Film ===
Year	Title	Role	Notes
1981	The Dozens	Star	
1985	Legend	Faerie Firelight Dancer	
1985	A Chorus Line	Kim	
1988	For Keeps	Lila	
1991	Missing Pieces	Bernice	
1993	Sister Act 2: Back in the Habit	Vegas Backup Singer #3	
1998	Half Baked	Talking Joint	
1998	Blues Brothers 2000	Dancer	

=== Television ===
Year	Title	Role	Notes
1977	Good Times	Fun Girl - Nancy Colton	Episode: "Breaker, Breaker"
1981	The Jeffersons	Teen Louise Mills	Episode: "And the Doorknobs Shined Like Diamonds"
1988	A Different World	Angela Atkins	Episode: "Three Girls Three"
1989–1990	Generations	Chantal Marshall	73 episodes
1990	DEA	Producer	Episode: "Aftermath"
1990	Cop Rock	D.A. Keresy	2 episodes
1992	The Fresh Prince of Bel-Air	Cindy	Episode: "Hilary Gets a Life" - Hilary calls her other friend Cindy, the woman credited as being Krista.
1995	The Crew	Vancielle	Episode: "The Worst Noel"
1998	Mr. Music	Puppy Munchie Singer #3	Television film
1999	The Famous Jett Jackson	Sea Nymph 1	Episode: "Bottoms Up"
1999	Introducing Dorothy Dandridge	Etta Jones	Television film
2001	Trackers	Young Woman	Episode: "Pilot"
2001	The Defectors	Brandy	Television film
2020	The Good Fight	Latisha	Episode: "The Gang Is Satirized and Doesn't Like It"
