= TC 2000 (film) =

1993 film by T. J. Scott

- Directed by: T. J. Scott
- Screenplay by: T. J. Scott
- Story by: J. Stephen Maunder; Richard M. Samuels
- Produced by: Jalal Merhi
- Starring: Bolo Yeung; Jalal Merhi; Billy Blanks; Bobbie Phillips; Matthias Hues
- Cinematography: Curtis Petersen
- Edited by: Reid Dennison
- Music by: Varouje
- Production company: Film One
- Distributed by: Shapiro-Glickenhaus Entertainment
- Release date: August 18, 1993
- Running time: 91 minutes
- Country: Canada
- Language: English

TC 2000 is a 1993 science fiction action film written and directed by T. J. Scott and starring Billy Blanks, Jalal Merhi, Bolo Yeung, Bobbie Phillips and Matthias Hues. Its plot takes place in a dystopian future, where an elite cop (Blanks) tries to reconnect with a fallen comrade (Phillips) turned into a cyborg by the government, while trying to protect his underground city from the surface rebels whose leader (Merhi) is responsible for her death. Some aspects of TC 2000 serve as product placement for an eponymous brand of martial arts equipment.

== Plot ==
In 2020, ecological disaster has driven the wealthy to an underground city. Jason Storm is part of an elite security force called the Tracker-Communicators who protect the city against the surface world survivors who could not afford to escape. Zoey Kinsella, the deceased founder's daughter, joins him as his rookie partner. After a raid by starving surface world survivors breaches the city's force field, Zoey comes to believe they have inside help. Storm acknowledges the possibility but is more concerned with his clashes against the Controller, the leader of the city's security, and his enforcer Bigalow. The Controller wants to replace human Tracker-Communicators, with a new generation of cyborg TCs, called TC-X.

Niki Picasso and his gang penetrate the underground city's force field and head directly to a disused area of the city. There, in a hidden cache, they find ammunition and an automatic rifle, a weapon that has become extremely rare. While Picasso pins down Storm and Kinsella, an unseen adversary shoots Kinsella dead. Convinced of a coverup, Storm angrily resigns, only to have the Controller send Bigalow to kill him. When Storm escapes the city, the Controller frames him for Kinsella's death and sets the security forces after him. Unknown to Storm, the Controller has Kinsella resurrected as a cyborg and programs her to be his personal assassin. Her first mission is to seduce Picasso and recruit him to take over a research facility guarded by the Lifers, a powerful gang.

On the surface world, Storm encounters a martial arts master, Sumai, and his daughter. Sumai helps Storm infiltrate Picasso's lair, but the cybernetic Kinsella easily defeats Storm. As Storm recovers, Sumai trains him. Sumai, former head of security at the research facility, tells Storm that Kinsella's father was the person who founded it. The facility was originally meant to counter the ecological damage but was converted into a chemical weapons factory. Suspecting that the Controller seeks the biological weapons to take over the surface world, Storm and Sumai recruit fighters who are willing to stand up to Picasso. As Picasso overpowers the Lifers with his rifle, the Controller murders the city's leader, the Overlord, and joins him.

After launching the chemical weapons, the Controller double-crosses Picasso. As the Controller flees the facility, Picasso confronts and kills him, though he is now left trapped in a silo. The chemicals, though currently inert, will kill every surface dweller unless a countdown is aborted. After defeating Bigalow and his men, Storm and Sumai break into the control room, where the Controller has left Kinsella. Storm helps her remember her true self, and she guesses several passwords. Finally, with time running out, Sumai guesses the correct password and saves the surface world. Picasso calls for help; when they ignore him, he vows revenge.

== Cast ==
- Billy Blanks as Jason Storm
- Bobbie Phillips as Zoey Kinsella / TC 2000 X
- Jalal Merhi as Niki Picasso
- Bolo Yeung as Master Sumai
- Matthias Hues as Bigalow
- Harry Mok as "Blade"
- Kelly Gallant as Zircon
- Ramsay Smith as The Controller
- Douglas J. Lennox as Overlord
- Gregory Philpot as Dr. Cameron Johnson
- Alex Appel as Sparks
- Scott Hogarth as Harold
- Andy Pandoff as Barker
- Dave Roberts as "Blaster"
- Wally Jay as Grand Master
- M. J. Kang as Sumai's Daughter
- Garry Robbins as "The Giant"
- Kevin Lund as The Referee

== Production ==
Following Merhi's breakthrough with Tiger Claws, a successor was immediately financed on the strength of pre-sales. TC 2000 started as a sequel to Tiger Claws, but evolved into an unrelated science-fiction picture. This was the first feature project offered to director T.J. Scott. The film's name, as well as the logo of its titular police unit and pieces of the anti-riot gear they wear, are promotional nods to a real-life line of martial arts sparring accessories, the TC 2000 series. The "Tracker Communicator" moniker used in storyline is a backronym chosen to fit the brand's initials (in reality the letters TC stand for Fremont, California-based manufacturer Tiger Claw).

Principal photography took place in the Toronto metropolitan area in November 1992, and parts of the shoot took place under frigid conditions. Much of the film's underground city was represented by the lower levels of a government complex located on Wellesley and Bay Street. Villain Niki Picasso's headquarters are represented by another public building, the Mississauga Civic Centre. The climactic scenes were filmed at a Toronto power plant. Bobbie Phillips suffered an accidental fall during filming.

U.S. backer Shapiro-Glickenhaus Entertainment was dissatisfied with the original cut of TC 2000 and ordered it retooled to emphasize action. Merhi suffered the brunt of it and lost around 15 minutes of screen time, which included some fighting as well as character moments that reflected his desire for a more dramatic film. This contributed to rising tensions between himself and SGE, and his departure from their partnership soon after. TC 2000 is dedicated to film journalist Duane Arnott, who also served as Film One's PR man and died in October 1992.

== Release ==
=== Theatrical ===
TC 2000 was released in Canadian theaters on June 2, 1993, through Cineplex Odeon Films.

=== Home video ===
In the U.S. the film premiered on home video on August 18, 1993, through MCA/Universal Home Video, with whom Shapiro-Glickenhaus had an output deal. The U.S. tape featured a commercial for a hot line selling martial arts products hyped within the film. The Canadian tape from Cineplex Odeon Video arrived on the same day as the American one. MCA/Universal also released the film on LaserDisc one week later.

The film has received a DVD release in some international territories, including the U.K., where a pressing from budget publisher Hollywood DVD was certified by the BBFC on October 22, 2003. TC 2000 was re-issued on a limited edition Blu-ray on November 26, 2021, as part of a series of Merhi releases from film preservationists Vinegar Syndrome, to which the producer has personally contributed.

== Reception ==
TC 2000 received negative reviews, with most of the criticism focusing on its crude production design. Rob Salem of The Toronto Star wrote that "TC 2000 is corny, clumsy, convoluted, cliched and many other adjectives that do not begin with the letter 'c'. But it is never boring." He noted that "[a]s a filmmaker, Merhi is nothing but not economical" as most of the film takes place inside "a big concrete basement", but "the money he's saved on sets and production values he's wisely spent on casting, with several familiar faces". Mike Mayo of The Roanoke Times was along the same lines, commenting: "TC 2000 probably had half the budget of Nemesis [whose video was released concurrently in the U.S.] and it's not particularly well made". However, he praised the cast, saying that "Billy Blanks has the looks and the moves to become a star in this genre. He's given solid support by Bobbie Philips and the incredible Bolo Yeung". The BBC's RadioTimes Guide to Science-Fiction also criticized the film's look, writing that "[a]ttempts to pass off run-down locations as part of the futuristic city and other high-tech locations aren’t convincing." Like most outlets, TV Guide derided "the film's Goodwill-store production design and costumes", but wrote that "star Billy Blanks is something to see, and the film takes every opportunity to spotlight his chiseled physique in action". However, it complained about Phillips' character arc, finding that "after her transformation from demure cop to camp cyborg siren, she does very little".

M.R. Martinez of Cash Box was negative. He compared the film a mix of Escape from New York and Soylent Green, but found that "a combination of martial arts and science-fiction falls flat" while "[Scott's] story is predicated upon the 'How many blows you take?' mentality." Joe Bob Briggs' B-movie publication Joe Bob Report was not much more enthusiastic, judging that "[t]he choreography of the kickboxing is pretty nice, but there’s too much of it", while the plot was "pointlessly obtuse and shot full of holes". Drew Wheeler of Billboard criticized the film's generic setting, dubbing it "UnOriginalWorld", and "this story's uncannny resemblance to so many other movies", concluding that "[o]nly martial-arts or SF die-hards [...] will have no complaint".

== Cancelled spiritual successor ==
Shortly after this film's release, Merhi announced that he would produce another post-apocalyptic film, to be written and directed by TC 2000 makeup effects supervisor Randy Daudlin. Tentatively titled S.I.N. (which stood for "Synthetic-cybernetic Interrogation Nexus"), the film would have pitted government-issued cyborgs against mutants on a nuclear-ravaged Earth, but did not materialize.
