= Fung Ging-man =

Hong Kong actor, filmmaker

- 馮敬文
- Fung in 1977
- Born: 22 January 1912; Shanghai, Republic of China
- Died: 9 November 1997 (aged 85); Nanjing, China
- Other name: Feng Ching-Wen Fung King-Man Feng Jingwen Feng Jing-Wen
- Occupations: Actor; script supervisor; production manager; director

Fung Ging-man (Chinese: 馮敬文), (22 January 1912 – 9 November 1997), sometimes credited as Ging-man Fung and Fung King-Man, was a Cantonese Hong Kong actor, script supervisor, production manager, and director. He acted in over 300 films, and he also played as himself in Bruce Lee, the Man and the Legend, which starred Bruce Lee.

== History ==
Fung was born in the city of Shanghai in 1912, eventually moving to Nanjing as a child. At the age of twenty, he moved to Hong Kong, and began acting in films such as The Mad Woman in 1937, produced by Nanyang Film Company. In 1954, Fung started became a production manager, and he produced 21 films. He also planned a movie in 1954 called The Lover with a Heart of Steel. He performed as Half Lotus in Bolo (1979), the directorial debut of Bolo Yeung. His final movie role before his death was The Fun, the Luck & the Tycoon in 1990.

== Death ==
On 9 November 1997, Fung has died at the age of 85.
