= Tiger claw (disambiguation) =

Tiger claw (Erythrina variegata) is a tree native to tropical areas.

Tiger claw, Tiger Claw, or Tiger's Claw may also refer to:

- Tiger Claw (Fu Jow Pai), a Chinese martial arts style
- Tiger claw (weapon), a claw-like South Asian weapon known as a bagh nakh
- Tiger Claw (G.I. Joe), a fictional character in the G.I. Joe universe
- Tiger Claw (Teenage Mutant Ninja Turtles), a fictional character in the 2012 series of Teenage Mutant Ninja Turtles
- Tiger Claws, a 1992 film directed by Kelly Makin
- Tiger's Claw, the mothership in the Wing Commander video game
