= Billy Blanks Jr. =

American fitness personality

- Occupation: Fitness personality
- Years active: 2007–present
- Notable work: Dance It Out
- Spouse: Sharon Brown (div.)
- Children: 1
- Father: Billy Blanks

Billy Blanks Jr. is an American fitness personality. He is the son of martial artist and Tae Bo creator, Billy Blanks. He is best known for his appearance on Shark Tank where he was able to get an investment in his fitness media which resulted in the worldwide Dance It Out fitness class program and franchise.

== Early life ==
Blanks was born to Billy and Gayle Blanks. He grew up in the Boston area. At age 9, he was cast in a production of The Little Rascals. In an interview with ACT: Dance Model Sing magazine, he said that he was told he was too young to be in a production for 42nd Street, but could help out the crew, but when the director saw him imitating some tap choreography, he was cast in the show. Blanks Sr. moved to Los Angeles when he got a job as a bodyguard for actress Catherine Bach, and the family followed soon after.

Blanks and his sister helped teach classes at Blanks Sr.'s Tae Bo studio. After Paula Abdul took Tae Bo classes there, she discovered he had an interest in dance, so she helped him develop his skills as a dancer and choreographer. He attended Reseda High School and graduated from Hollywood High School. At age 18, he landed a role as Tyrone in the Fame musical's European tour and the U.S. tour in 1999. He continued to do work with Abdul, and starred in various commercials, videos, and stage productions.

== Career ==
In 2007, Blanks created "Cardioke", a cardio dance workout that featured karaoke singing. This garnered the attention of ABC News. Cardioke was promoted on The Ellen DeGeneres Show. On December 10, 2017, his former manager Anthony Riccio filed a lawsuit against him for contractual fraud, claiming they came up with the concept of mixing cardio and karaoke together and that he coined the term "cardioke", whereas Blanks wanted to call it "Karaokecise", and should have shared more revenue and rights over the brand. Blanks also said that his father was not supportive of his dance fitness concept.

The popularity of Cardioke led Blanks to offers to produce DVDs. Blanks and his wife developed a series of DVDs in including Cardio Fit (2010), Groove and Burn (2010), Fat Burning Hip Hop Mix (2011) and Dance Party Boot Camp (2012). However, they were not making much money, so Blanks had to take on a part-time job at a restaurant. Blanks and his family lived in meager (he says "homeless") conditions, including having to move to a low-budget motel in Sherman Oaks, where they would sneak out from there to teach classes at 24 Hour Fitness under the program name Dance With Me. They moved to Woodland Hills.

In 2012, Blanks and his wife appeared on Shark Tank. Sharks Daymond John and Mark Cuban offered Blanks and his wife a deal to join Zumba. Concerned that his work would be lost to the competing franchise, Blanks declined the offer in front of the Sharks, but on his way to record the post-show interview, John followed him to the holding room, explained how the branding would work, and persuaded Blanks to accept the deal, which involved $100,000 and 50% stake in the company. During the months between the filming of the episode and its eventual airing, he had lost his opportunity to teach at 24-Hour Fitness, and opened Blanks Studios "down the street". They also had to get approval from Blanks Sr to use his name in the brand, which Blanks Sr. agreed.

This led to the eventual launch of the Dance It Out program. In 2013, he had some recurring segments as a fitness personality on The Dr. Oz Show They conducted Dance It Out classes at Blanks Studios, and have taken the program nationally and internationally with over a thousand certified instructors. and conducted special live sessions for employees at Whirlpool Corporation in Michigan.

In 2017, Blanks moved to Greenwich, Connecticut where he opened his dance and fitness studio at the Arthur Murray Dance Studio, and served as the artistic director for the Wall Street Theater in Norwalk. Blanks also served as a judge for the Dancing Stars of Greenwich charity event in 2018, which raised money for Abilis.

In 2020, Blanks worked with Lifetime to produce Dance It Out as a "moving fitness talk show". The show features interviews with people followed by dance segments where Blanks Jr. invites everyone to participate. He wanted to get people moving when they were stuck in their homes during COVID-19 quarantine. In 2021, he launched an app with Touchpoint Group Holdings, Inc. that allows subscribers to live-stream classes hosted by Blanks and other instructors from home. In addition to his current work with Dance It Out, Blanks is a creative director of the Talent Recap website and hosts their related show which covers television talent shows.

== Personal life ==
Blanks married actress Sharon Brown. They taught dance and fitness classes together, and she was part of Blanks's Dance With Me videos and the Dance It Out classes. They have an adopted son, Elijah. They divorced in 2016.

== Filmography ==
=== Television ===
| Year | Title | Role | Notes | Refs |
|---|---|---|---|---|
| 1994 | Sister, Sister | Bellboy | Ep. "The Birthday" | |
| 1996 | Sister, Sister | Jason | Ep. "Reality Really Bites" | |
| 2012 | Shark Tank | Himself | Ep. "Episode 314" | |
| 2020 | Dance It Out | Host | Lifetime Channel | |

=== Videos ===
- Dance with Me Cardio Fit (Lionsgate, 2010)
- Dance with Me Groove & Burn (Lionsgate, 2010)
- Fat Burning Hip Hop Mix (Lionsgate, 2011)
- Dance Party Boot Camp (Lionsgate, 2012)

=== Other media ===
- "Born Too Slow" by The Crystal Method music video as Silver Man, 2004
- Dance It Out app, 2021
