= Ironheart (film) =

1992 film by Robert Clouse

- Ironheart movie poster
- Directed by: Robert Clouse
- Written by: Larry Riggins
- Produced by: Britton K. Lee; Greg Long
- Starring: Bolo Yeung; Richard Norton; Britton K. Lee
- Cinematography: Kent L. Wakeford
- Edited by: Peter Appleton; Alain Jakubowicz
- Music by: U-Krew; Tom Gunn
- Distributed by: Morning Star Entertainment
- Release date: 1992
- Running time: 92 minutes
- Country: United States
- Language: English

Ironheart is a 1992 martial arts film starring Bolo Yeung, created as a showcase vehicle for Britton K. Lee. It is considered a cult classic by many Bolo Yeung fans.

== Plot ==
Ironheart opens at a Portland nightclub (Upfront FX), where Milverstead, who is considered the most powerful and ruthless man in town, and his group of thugs are looking at the female clientele with an approving eye. Milverstead is shipping illegal arms out of the Portland docks, and to sweeten the deals with his trading partners, he kidnaps local lonely dancers, strings them out on heroin, and sends them along in the deal. He notices Cindy Kane (Meagan Hughes) dancing furiously to U-Krew's hit "If You Were Mine" and decides to kidnap her. To lure her into his trap, he instructs his young lieutenant Richard (Michael Lowry) to flirt with her and get her to go with him. Cindy is ostensibly with her loser boyfriend Stevo (Rob Buckmaster) at the club, but wants to get him jealous and so leaves with Richard. Milverstead and his gang leave shortly thereafter.

However, they are being tailed from the club by a new policeman on the Portland force from LA named Douglas (David Mountain), Douglas has been tipped to Milverstead's shady dealings and follows everyone to the docks, where most of the gang is now dragging Cindy onto a boat, locking her in a cage and shooting her full of heroin. At this point, Milverstead's second in command, Ice (Bolo Yeung) takes some of the gang and lays a trap for Douglas. They beat Douglas senseless, at which point Ice shoots Douglas in cold blood on a pile of old tires, and also blows up his car with gunfire.

Back in LA, Douglas's old partner John Keem (Britton K. Lee) is made aware of his partner's untimely death and strangely ordered to Portland to assist the local police in the investigation. While driving to Portland in a red convertible Porsche, he stops for a sandwich when he notices some men on the beach smoking marijuana and, subsequently, attempting to rape a female jogger. He goes to investigate when he is charged by a drugged out rapist named Spike, and promptly beats him and the rest of the potential rapists up, saving the jogger's life. When he goes to check on the woman, she has fled in terror from the bizarre encounter.

Upon reaching Portland, he immediately goes to meet with Captain Kronious (Joe Ivy), who offers assistance and mentions that a woman also disappeared the same night Douglas was killed, a Cindy Kane. John goes to talk to Stevo and see if there is perhaps a connection between Cindy's disappearance and Douglas's fateful death. Milverstead arranges to have Cindy sent overseas with his next shipment, and brags to Ice how pleased he is things are going so smoothly, as he HATES chaos.

John Keem meets up Stevo, who tells him Cindy left with a strange guy from the club, so they go to investigate that night. Milverstead is there along with his gang, so John Keem stirs things up a bit by starting a fight to get Milverstead's attention when he sees a friend of Cindy named Kristy (Karman Kruschke) being harassed by a couple young punks. Puzzled that Ice has never heard of this new heavy hitter, he sets about to find out who exactly John Keem is.

Kristy runs a dance studio, so John Keem decides to pay her a visit the next day and question her about Cindy. Cindy, unfortunately, became a "tragic dancer's story", where she was talented, but got lazy and started simply dancing at the clubs trying to land a rich guy, leading Stevo on the whole time that he had an actual chance with her. They go to lunch, where they are interrupted by Stevo (whom Kristy calls "Cherub") who tells John Keem to check out an address given to him by the Captain. John races off to follow the tip, leaving Stevo to awkwardly hit on Kristy just one day after his girlfriend goes missing.

John finds the address, but when he gets closer to the house to investigate, he sees a bomb planted just inside the window by Milverstead's henchman Simmons (Pat Patterson) and runs away just as it explodes. Simmons and his accomplices try to corner John, and they then engage in a wild gun battle where two of the gang are killed and Simmons wings John Keem in the shoulder. At this moment, Kristy arrives out of nowhere in an old Volkswagen Beetle and just drives through the middle of the battle, allowing Simmons to escape. Kristy jumps out of her car and gets in a shouting match with John, who calms her down and blows up her car so it can't be traced. They drive off together to continue the hunt.

Back on Milverstead's boat, he is relaxing with a drink Ice just made when Simmons arrives. He quizzes Simmons about whether or not John Kim was dead, and makes him feel guilty about botching the operation so badly. Simmons sputters out some nonsense about knowing that he shot John Keem, but refuses to answer whether or not he terminated the target. Disgusted, Milverstead tells Simmons the dead men's blood scream for his, so he has Ice strangle Simmons with his own tie and toss him overboard.

Kristy attends to John Keem's wounds back at her place, when she starts to get emotional. Unmoved, John Keem listens and then they promptly sleep together with no apparent pre-text other than they were both there. Stevo is frantically trying to reach John Keem, so he calls Kronious to let him know that Richard, the guy Cindy went home with, works for Milverstead. He then goes off to complete his route for Hot Flash Pizza. However, Captain Kronious calls Milverstead with this information, and not John Keem. Milverstead gets off the phone and asks Ice, who has been bouncing a pencil while awaiting his next order, if he'd like a little "exercise". Ice throws down the pencil and goes off to find and kill Stevo.

After their sexual encounter, John Keem goes off to finish the investigation while Kristy goes to collect her 8-year-old daughter she left at the club with the reception several hours earlier. John Keem learns that Stevo has been killed, and makes the connection that Milverstead is involved. He takes the fight to Milverstead by impersonating a homeless man and banging on the door to Milverstead Shipping in downtown Portland to alert the night watchman. They let him in, and he promptly kills or maims the entire security team and finds evidence to finish Milverstead once and for all.

Milverstead is waiting for him at the club, and offers a bonus to any of his henchman who kills John Keem. Kristy leaves her daughter at home alone again to try and lure Milverstead out into the open by dancing up a storm at the dance club. Milverstead knows she is working with John Kim, but decides to kidnap her and send her overseas anyway to punish her for working with him. Unfortunatetly, John Keem dispatches his henchman with a single punch and quickly follows Milverstead and Ice to the docks. There he also finds the double-crossing Captain Kronious, and gets him to tell him where Milverstead is before he shoots and kills him.

He then kills off the remaining henchman (besides Ice) and corners a helpless Milverstead. Wielding a samurai sword he took off one of the henchman, he chops a sobbing Milverstead's head off and turns to face Ice. He quickly beats (but does not kill) Ice, avenging his friend's death. He goes back to LA with Kristy and her daughter to start a new chapter of his life.

== Cast ==
- Bolo Yeung: Ice
- Richard Norton: Milverstead
- Karman Kruschke: Kristy
- Britton K. Lee: John Kim
- Joe Ivy: Captain Kronious
- Pat Patterson: Simmons
- Rob Buckmaster: Stevo
- Michael Lowry: Richard
- Jim Hechim: Hanz
- Darell Kirkpatrick: Gang Member

== Production ==
The film was set and shot in Portland, Oregon.
