= Donlands Theatre =

Coordinates: 43°41′38″N 79°20′33″W

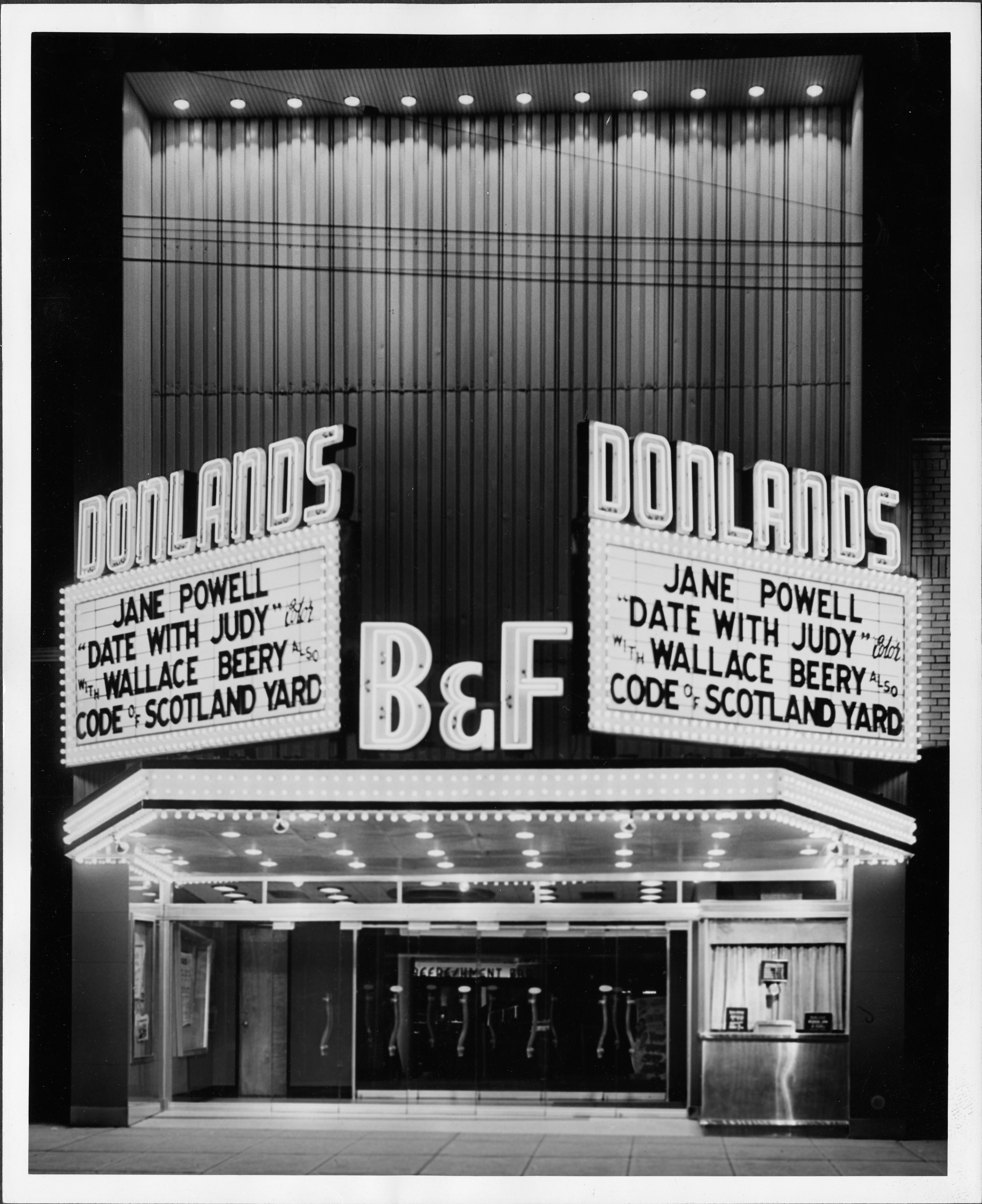
- Donlands Theatre, 1948

General information
- Location: 397 Donlands Avenue; Toronto
- Opened: 1948
- Closed: 1984

Design and construction
- Architect: Herbert G. Duerr

Other information
- Seating capacity: 838

The Donlands Theatre, is a multipurpose complex and former movie theatre, located on the eponymous Donlands Avenue in the East York neighbourhood of Toronto, Ontario, Canada.

== Theatre ==
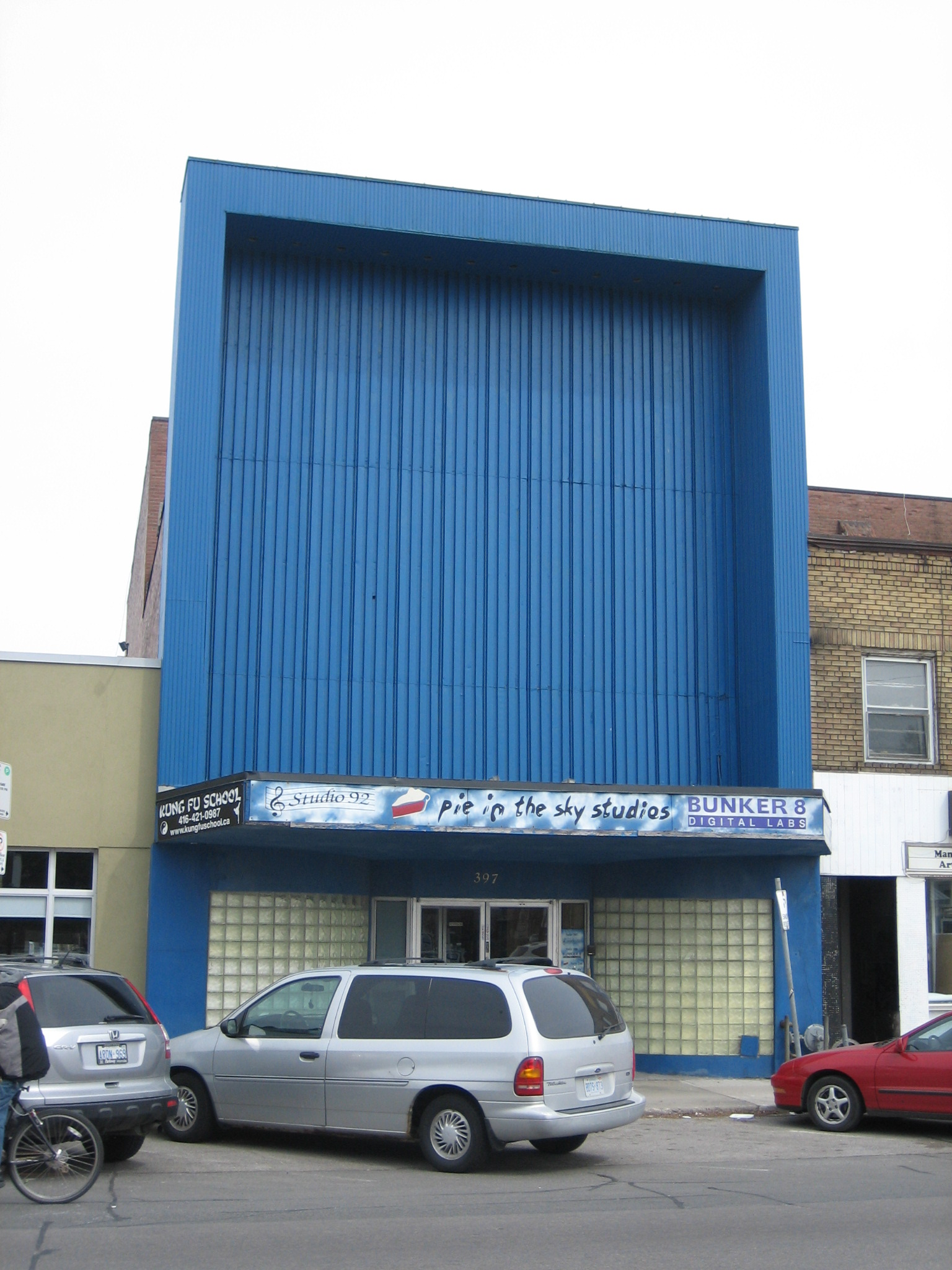
The Donlands Theatre, in its modern incarnation as a film and recording studio.

After a protracted construction that lasted more than one and a half year due to a workers' strike, the Donlands Theatre opened on 20 November 1948 with a screening of the historical drama Tap Roots. It operated as part of the regional Bloom and Fine chain, a Famous Players affiliate, until 1969. It was favorite childhood spot of actor John Candy, who grew up in the neighborhood. Some sources also mention that he worked there as an usher. Writer Pierre Berton and his wife, who lived next door with their first daughter, were also regular patrons. It then operated directly under the Famous Players umbrella, before being sold in 1975 amidst a reorganization of the company's assets. Shortly prior to the sale, it was described as a repertory cinema, offering multiple bills in quick rotation.

Following a short tenure under the management of one William Collins, the building then reemerged as a specialty theatre and occasional live venue catering to the area's growing Indian, and particularly Hindi-speaking immigrant community. It was owned by local event promoter Darshan Sahota, who also managed the Landsdowne and Paradise Theatres. Ashok "Charlie" Mehra, the owner of several hospitality businesses and the principal of Scarborough-based company Friends Film (Canada), was also associated with the venue. Several prominent South Asian entertainers have made personal appearances there, including classic actor Dilip Kumar.

While the theatre employed IATSE projectionists under Famous Players, it apparently ran afoul of the organization during Sahota's ownership tenure, as the Toronto Motion Pictures Projectionists Union, an IATSE member, filed grievances against him with the Ontario Labour Relations Board. In early 1984, the theatre saw its license suspended due to safety violations, including overcrowding.

=== Design ===
The Donlands Theatre was designed in 1946 by Toronto-based theatre specialist Herbert G. Duerr. Kaplan & Sprachman, another study specializing in theatres, contributed to later renovations. The Donlands is an example of modern theatrical architecture, although it also incorporated art deco touches. It offered lodges but did not possess a balcony. The theatre's entrance has earned notice for its Asian-influenced decor, which features a domed ceiling painted with a dragon and the Chinese symbol for prosperity embedded in the floor. While those decorative elements predated the transformation of the place into a kung fu movie studio, the Donlands was never a Chinese cinema.

== Multipurpose complex ==
=== Sound studios ===
After a period of closure while awaiting a sale in 1985, the theatre was repurposed as a suite of business spaces, primarily intended for use as recording studios and post-production facilities. That incarnation of the building was promoted under the commercial names Mediaplex and Media Centre.

Among early adopters was Studio 92, a new studio founded by engineer Norman Barker which was housed on the third floor. It settled there in 1986 or 1987 depending on sources, and would be the building's emblematic tenant until 2011. Barker went on to receive two Juno Awards for his work at the studio. It was used by former Chilliwack member Glenn Miller for several of his productions. The building also welcomed a group of companies associated with Toronto's christian rock scene, which were previously housed within the walls of the Yonge Street Mission, such as former Deliverance member Doug Virgin's Yonge Street Records. As of 2024, part of the building still operates as a recording studio.

Although it was primed for a renovation, the main theatre lay mostly unoccupied through the rest of the 1980s. It was there however, rather than in the theatre's dedicated studios, that the band Blue Rodeo recorded their classic album Diamond Mine in December 1988 with the help of a mobile sound unit.

=== Film studios ===
The disused theatre was used as an underground kung fu club during the 1990 shoot of the film Tiger Claws. Not long after, its producer and star, Jalal Merhi, moved in full time and fitted out the headquarters of his company Film One inside the building. Over the following years, it came to boast a soundstage, production offices, two film editing suites, a video offline suite and a 25-seat 35mm screening room. The music studios already housed inside the theatre remained active as independent entities. The facility has seen several occupants following Film One's departure, and is still active as a film studio.

=== Martial arts ===
An actual kung fu school has also been operated inside the Donlands Theatre, with an opening date listed as 2007.
