= Writing Kung Fu =

1979 Hong Kong film by Bolo Yeung

- Lobby card for Writing Kung Fu
- Traditional Chinese: 文打
- Hanyu Pinyin: Wen da
- Directed by: Bolo Yeung (credited as Yang Sze)
- Written by: Ni Kuang
- Produced by: Yang Yung-kang
- Starring: Chang Wu-lang
- Cinematography: Yu Tsin
- Music by: Frankie Chan Fan-Kei
- Production company: Mountview Film Co. (H.K.)
- Distributed by: Unifilm International Company
- Release date: 1979; (Hong Kong)
- Running time: 81 minutes (original version & French dub); 79 minutes (English dub)
- Country: Hong Kong
- Languages: Mandarin; Cantonese

Writing Kung Fu (Chinese: 文打; pinyin: Wen da; lit. 'Writing Strike'), also known as Chinese Samson and Hot Dog Kung Fu, is a 1979 Hong Kong martial arts drama film directed by Bolo Yeung (credited as Yang Sze).

== Plot ==
During the Tea War, convoys of tea and their escorts are being robbed and killed by gangs of outlaws. Red Clay Village is a small outpost along the trade route on the border between the north and south. A man wearing all white enters town pretending to be a tea and salt trade delegate and regarded with suspicion by a traveling blind fortune-teller and his assistant, both of them drunken boxers. A weak teacher in the village attempts to teach his poor and orphaned students, focusing on a good conscience. Stronger miscreants throw money at him and beat him as he tries to collect it, so his students ridicule him as stupid and abandon his class. One female student, Ah Cheung, remains loyal and Ah Cheung's encourages the teacher to find a way to continue teaching the children.

The teacher collaborates with the two drunken boxers, calling out words that they then use as fighting moves. In return, they teach him new kung fu skills, including strikes involving writing. The drunken boxers tell the teacher that the man posing as a trade delegate is actually Ah Yen, a man who ten years earlier came from Vietnam and murdered fifteen residents of Red Clay Village.

The girl in pink is the sister of the leader of a group of traders collaborating with Ah Yen. She begs the teacher not to fight with her brother because the teacher cannot win. They practice kung fu together using moves based on lines of poetry. The teacher then wins money with his former adult student at a cockfight (this scene is removed in the English dub but is still present in the French dub. The teacher finds his former students learning kung fu and asks them to come back to him, but they tell him that books are no use and they only want to learn kung fu.

An adult former student of the teacher attempts to play with his old classmate Ah Cheung, but she refuses and runs away. The man then finds Ah Cheung's dead body in a shallow grave and sees Ah Yen walking away from it. The teacher is robbed of his winnings at night, then in the daytime he finds Ah Cheung's mother dead in her house with a noose hanging from the roof in an attempt to stage the scene as if it were a suicide. Lost in despair, the teacher is advised by a beggar to not give up. The fortune-teller's assistant gives the teacher a note recounting Ah Yen's murderous rampage ten years earlier, which the teacher then gives to the girl in pink, though Ah Yen sees this.

When the teacher's adult former student is caught stealing from the girl in pink's brother, the teacher offers to take the punishment for him. The girl in pink's brother criticizes him for teaching his students to steal and tells him that he must leave the village by sundown. The adult former student then sees Ah Yen and points him out as the one who killed Ah Cheung, but Ah Yen fights everyone off. Ah Yen visits the blind fortune-teller and kills him and his assistant in a fight. Ah Yen then fights the beggar, who skillfully avoids many of Ah Yen's strikes before being brutally injured. The beggar teaches the teacher new kung fu moves based on lines of poetry shortly before dying. In his last moments, he uses his blood to draw the character "字" ("writing") on the teacher's palm.

The teacher fervently practices techniques of kung fu involving writing as Ah Yen kills the girl in pink's brother and his associates. The teacher arrives and finds the girl in pink's dead body strung up naked. The teacher finds Ah Yen playing his flute outside the village and battles him, eventually killing him by pressing his body into the flute, impaling both Ah Yen as well as himself on it. The teacher's former students return and apologize, saying that they will obey him and be good, but the teacher dies in front of them.

== Cast ==
- John Cheung Ng-Long as Teacher (credited as Chang Wu-lang)
- Yu An-an as Girl in Pink
- Bolo Yeung as Ah Yen (credited as Yang Sze)
- Johnny Cheung Wah (credited as Chang Hua)
- Chiang Cheng as Blinded Fighter (credited as Kong Kwong-keung)
- Su Han
- Siu Yuk-lung
- Lau Kim Fung
- Chiang Wang
- San Sin (credited as Sheng Se)
- Cheung Bing-chan
- Pang Yun-cheung (extra)

== Production and release ==
Speaking about the film in an interview with coolasscinema.com, actor John Cheung said, "My little brother, Johnny Cheung, is in this movie with me and Bolo. He was also an action choreographer for Jackie Chan and was a stunt double doing dangerous scenes for Jackie and other actors. The action design in WRITING KUNG FU was done by me, my brother, and Bolo, who also directed the movie."

Writing Kung Fu was filmed in Thailand.

The website thaiworldview.com states, "Two versions were released. One for the Hong Kong market with John Cheung. One for the Thai market with Thai actor Sombat Methanee. Thai version is lost."

The cockfighting scene was removed from the English dub, but is still present in the French dub, which accounts for the runtime discrepancy between the two versions.

The film has been released under the English titles Writing Kung Fu, Hot Dog Kung Fu and Chinese Samson.

The film was released in Australia on 1 October 1981 with the classification "M": "The content is moderate in impact".

== Reception ==
Reviewer Ben Johnson of kungfumovieguide.com gave the film a rating of 4 out of 5 stars, writing, "Bolo Yeung's second film as director is a messianic allegory, an unsettling study on the rich-poor divide, and a testament to faith in a world corrupted by wealth and power. There is a poignancy and anger to the story which makes it more than just your standard kung fu movie, with Bolo casting himself as the embodiment of pure evil. Dressed in white (the colour of death in China), he poses as a Grim Reaper-like salt trader to infiltrate a small ragtag community of orphans, alcoholics and unscrupulous profiteers, before bumping them off with the hope of stealing their treasure. A child killer, a rapist, and a sadistic assassin responsible for a mining attack some 10 years previously, Bolo's a flute-playing harbinger of doom in a bleak backwater town whose only hope is John Cheung's troubled scholar. Cheung's attempts to offer the community's orphaned children an education sees him run out of town as a useless do-gooder. He is told books are no use in the modern world, and instead, the kids learn how to fight at a kung fu school. Cheung hits the bottle but is saved by a homeless man who teaches him kung fu through a wonderful sequence of poetry and movement. By developing his own style of 'calligraphy kung fu', Bolo takes a very literal stance on the meaning of the age-old proverb, 'the pen is mightier than the sword'. Brain meets brawn in the film's final showdown with Bolo asking of Cheung, 'where is your god now?' The film's downbeat ending is symbolic and poses a moral conundrum: who are the heroes in a world where greed is rewarded and the actions of an honest man is overlooked? And all this from the guy who crushes skulls in Enter the Dragon. Very impressive."

Reviewer Dr. Acula of badmovies.de gave the film a rating of 2/5, writing, "'Writing Kung Fu' is the kind of script in which two seemingly unrelated plots run artlessly alongside each other and the viewer increasingly wonders how the hell the plot lines are supposed to be connected in a coherent way." The review continues, "The fights are not particularly well choreographed and, despite Ah Yen's fame as a cruel killer, they are not that brutal." The review concludes, "Fans of Eastern things should take a look just out of curiosity to see how Bolo fares as a director. For beginners, 'Writing Kung Fu' is probably a bit too meh despite one or two nice ideas..."

Rapper RZA listed Writing Kung Fu as one of his ten favorite kung fu flicks. The Wu-Tang Clan sampled the English dub of the film in their songs "In the Hood" and "Campfire".

Bey Logan listed it as one of his favorite martial arts movies.

The website thaiworldview.com gave the film a rating of 3/5.

The website raremoviecollector.com called the film "A classic of the genre".
