= Bolo (film) =

1979 Hong Kong film by Bolo Yeung

- Lobby card for Bolo
- Traditional Chinese: 白馬黑七
- Hanyu Pinyin: Bai ma hei qi
- Directed by: Bolo Yeung (credited as Yang Sze)
- Screenplay by: Yeung Hon Ning
- Produced by: Raymond
- Starring: Bolo Yeung; Jason Pai Piao
- Cinematography: Yu Tsin
- Edited by: Cheung Kok Cheng
- Music by: Chow Fook-Leung
- Production company: Star Film (H. K.) Co.
- Release date: 1979; (Hong Kong)
- Running time: 90 minutes
- Country: Hong Kong
- Languages: Mandarin; Cantonese

Bolo (Chinese: 白馬黑七; pinyin: Bai ma hei qi; lit. 'White Horse Black Seven'), also known as Bolo - The Brute, Fists of Justice (or Fist of Justice) and Beast Fighter, is a Mandarin-language 1979 Hong Kong martial arts comedy film directed by Bolo Yeung (credited as Yang Sze) in his directorial debut.

== Plot ==
Following the murder of a succession of sheriffs in Wu Yu village, the mayor has prisoners draw lots to be the next two sheriffs. The marked lots are drawn by Ma, a trickster, and Bolo, a brute. They pay a blind farmer to take them into town on his wagon.

Once in the village, Ma stops the mayor's son Pao Jan Ken from harassing a priest's niece. Bolo tells the priest that he wants to become Christian because he heard Christians can talk well, while Ma gambles to try to win money but ends up in a fight instead.

Bolo is framed as a human trafficker and imprisoned. He ends up eating so much that the mayor pays him to leave the prison. Bolo is convinced my Ma to rob the bank, where he kills the mayor's son. They give the money to the priest to build a hospital.

Human trafficker Shu Fu and his brother Half Lotus attack Bolo and Ma. After Bolo and Ma win, they are confronted by the mayor, who is mourning the death of his son and is accompanied by his other son, the "Champion of Japan", whom they quickly defeat. The cook who was carrying the mayor's son then steps in to fight them using the pan he was wearing on his head, but is also defeated when Bolo and Ma join forces.

Attempting to leave the village, Bolo and Man knock over the blind farmer's wagon and discover a bag full of gold.

== Cast ==
- Jason Pai Piao (白彪) as Ma
- Bolo Yeung (楊斯) as Bolo (credited as Yang Sze)
- Huang Ha (黃哈) as Man Fighting with Pan (credited as Wong Ha)
- Chin Yuet-Sang (錢月笙) as Undertaker (pole fighter) (credited as Chin Yet Sun)
- San Kuai (山怪) as Man Who Attacks Sleeping Bolo (credited as San Kwei)
- Lau Yat-Fan (劉一帆) as Mayor Pao (credited as Lau Yet Fan)
- To Siu-Ming (杜少明) as Mayor's Cross-Eyed Son Pao Jen Kan (credited as Tog Siew Meng)
- Milan (米蘭) as Priest's Niece
- Na Na (娜娜) as Prostitute
- Fung Ging-Man (馮敬文) as Half Lotus
- Eric Tsang (曾志偉) as Brothel Madam
- Yue Tau-Wan (魚頭雲) as Champion of Japan
- Chin Ti (金帝) as Poisoning Waiter
- Lau Hok-Nin (劉鶴年) as Man on Crutches
- Addy Sung Gam-Loi (宋金來) as Cross-Eyed Waiter
- Sai Gwa-Pau (西瓜刨) as Old Bucktooth
- Peter Chan Lung (陳龍) as Doctor
- Lee Sau-Kei (李壽祺) as Priest
- Yam Ho (任浩) as Detective
- Luk Chuen (鹿村泰祥) as Messenger
- Aai Dung-Gwa (矮冬瓜) as Blind Farmer Lai Lau (a.k.a. Blind Mai Lai)
- James Nam (南宮勳) as Service Charge Captain
- Chen Yuwei (陳玉薇) as Brothel Chambermaid
- Lau Tak-Man (劉德敏) as Tall Woman

== Production and release ==
Bolo was filmed in Hong Kong.

The film has been released under the English titles Bolo also known as Bolo - The Brute, Fists of Justice (or Fist of Justice) and Beast Fighter.

== Reception ==
Reviewer Jedadiah Leland of the website unobtainium13.com wrote, "Bolo is like a Kung Fu version of the type comedic spaghetti westerns that Bud Spencer and Terrence Hill used to make in the 70s, with the exception that it's far more incoherent than anything that ever starred Spencer and Hill." The review concludes, "Even if it's never clear why anyone's fighting and the sound effects often don't match the actions of the combatants, some of the fight scenes are exciting. That's really the main reason why anyone's going to watch something like Bolo and in that case, the movie doesn’t disappoint. The fights are cool. It's just too bad that the plot keeps getting in the way.

Mitch Reviews Everything stated that the film "fell a little bit short on the comedy dynamic" and that "there's a lotta bad cuts during the actual fights [...] so you get kind of a choppy feel to a lot of the fights in this one". The review concludes that "all in all, it was highly entertaining."
