= Jungleground =

1995 film by Don Allan

- Original key art
- Directed by: Don Allan
- Written by: Michael Stokes
- Produced by: George Flak
- Starring: Roddy Piper; Torri Higginson; Peter Williams; JR Bourne; Rachel Wilson
- Cinematography: Gilles Corbeil
- Edited by: Marvin Lawrence
- Music by: Varouje Hagopian
- Production companies: Norstar Entertainment; Performance Pictures
- Distributed by: Alliance Atlantis (Canada); Triboro Entertainment (U.S.)
- Release dates: August 8, 1995 (Canada, U.S.)
- Running time: 95 minutes
- Country: Canada
- Language: English
- Budget: CAD$2.5 million

Jungleground is a 1995 Canadian action film directed by Don Allan and starring Roddy Piper, Torri Higginson, Peter Williams, JR Bourne and Rachel Wilson. Piper plays a cop challenged to a high stakes escape game by the ruler of a violent no-go zone (JR Bourne), who has kidnapped his girlfriend (Higginson) and threatens to kill her if he fails.

== Cast ==
- Roddy Piper as Lt. Jake Cornell
- Torri Higginson as Sammy Woods
- Peter Williams as Dragon
- JR Bourne as Odin
- Rachel Wilson as Posie
- Joel Gordon as Gameshow
- Lexa Doig as Spider
- Nicholas Campbell as Robert Neilson
- Christopher Kennedy as Diesel
- Jason Blicker as Ferret
- Jeff Wood as Thor
- Michael A. Miranda as Slim (as Silvio Oliviero)
- Victoria Snow as Sgt. Purdy
- Damon D'Oliveira as Blackjack
- Anne Marie DeLuise as Whitney (as Anne Marie Loder)
- Robin Dunne as Pretty Boy
- Earl Pastko as Louis Brising
- Nicole de Boer as Caitlin Dean

== Production ==
Jungleground was made by two Toronto companies, Peter R. Simpson's Norstar Entertainment and George Flak's Performance Pictures, who had worked with Piper the year prior on Back in Action. It marked Piper's ninth feature film appearance. Despite its familiar gang-based storyline, the star vouched to rise above mere exploitation, saying: "We don't want this to be just a fighter punching out a bunch of kids. Also, several of the characters are more than just stereotypes." Don Allan of Revolver Pictures, a notable player in the field of music videos, made his first and only directorial feature with this film.

Principal photography took place in the Toronto metropolitan area between mid July and late August 1994, shortly after No Contest, another Norstar production in which Piper played a supporting role. The announced budget was CAD$2.5 million. A section of Cherry Street, a public road in the south of the city, was flanked with rows of derelict cars to transform it into the main artery of the film's fictional crime district. A number of extras, whom Piper described as "decent kids in bad situations", were actually drawn from local gangs. Allan rented pieces from Hamilton plastician Antonella Sigismondi, a friend who had done art direction for several music videos, to represent the work of Torri Higginson's sculptor character.

== Release ==
=== Pre-release ===
The film was screened for industry professionals at the 1995 American Film Market in Santa Monica, and the MIFED (Mercato internazionale del film e del documentario) in Milan.

=== Home media ===
Jungleground debuted on Canadian and U.S. VHS on August 8, 1995. In Canada, the film was part of a multi-picture distribution deal between Norstar and Malofilm. In the U.S., it was picked up by Triboro Entertainment. Triboro and disc-based media specialists Image Entertainment brought the film to LaserDisc on October 25, 1995. Image also re-issued it on DVD on July 20, 1999.

== Reception ==
=== Commercial ===
According to numbers quoted from trade publication Video Store Magazine, Jungleground produced a strong return on investment of 164.2 percent for its rental outlets.

=== Critical ===
Jungleground received mostly positive reviews. Mike Mayo of The Roanoke Times wrote that "[o]verall, the film's got an inventiveness, colorful characters and humor that fans expect of a good action movie, and Piper has the presence to carry it off. Robert Philpot of the Fort Worth Star-Telegram assessed that "[f]ormer pro wrestler Roddy Piper has a way with a one-liner, and for all its derivativeness, the movie does have some original ideas". In his publication VideoScope, genre critic Joe Kane described it as "Escape from New York meets The Most Dangerous Game", but added that "[f]ortunately, director Don Allan and crew keep the pace so blistering that this new sprint through old turf kept us pretty much glued". LaserDisc News was in agreement, saying that "[t]he explosions are good and the narrative never slows down or gets sidetracked".

Among dissenters was TV Guide, who opined that "[n]ot one minute of Jungleground is enlivened by any emotional subtext" while "[c]haracters only exist to be set up as potential homicides". It also deemed that comparisons with the recent and bigger-budgeted Hard Target and Surviving the Game did it no favor. Gerard Fratley, author of the book A Century of Canadian Cinema, was strongly put off by Jungleground's violence. Calling it "[a]n odious film", he complained that "[p]unks are everywhere, buildings are decrepit, crime is rampant, brutal gang war rules, bullets fly and cars are aflame in a darkness that seems eternal. A love affair between a policeman and a dancer lightens this pit of depravity all too briefly."
