= Driving Force (1989 film) =

- Directed by: Andrew Prowse
- Written by: Patrick Edgeworth
- Produced by: Howard Grigsby; Rod Confesor; Antony I. Ginnane (executive)
- Starring: Sam J. Jones; Catherine Bach
- Cinematography: Kevan Lind; Richard Michalak
- Edited by: Tony Paterson
- Music by: Paul Schutze
- Production companies: J & M Entertainment
- Release date: May 12, 1989
- Running time: 87 minutes
- Countries: Philippines; United States; Australia
- Language: English

Driving Force is a 1989 science fiction action film directed by A.J. Prowse.

== Plot ==
A widower Steve (Sam Jones) and his girlfriend Harry (Catherine Bach) stop Nelson (Don Swayze) and his tow-truck drivers of the future who boost business with accidents and start a war with them that leads to bloodshed and violence.

== Cast ==
- Sam J. Jones as Steve
- Catherine Bach as Harry
- Don Swayze as Nelson
- Stephanie Mason as Becky
- Ancel Cook as Pete
- Gerald Gordon as John
- Renata Scott as Leslie
- Robert Marius as "Surf"
- Billy Blanks as Pool
- Michael Joiner as Black Night Mechanic

== Production ==
The events of the film were originally supposed to take place in Australia in the near future, since all the creators of the film, including the screenwriter, were Australians, but in order to save money, filming was conducted in the Philippines with American actors. Filming took place in Manila during a time of political unrest, with lead actress Catherine Bacha hiring Billy Blanks as a bodyguard. The producers were impressed with Blanks and the character of Pool was written into the script for Blanks.

Legendary Australian stuntman Grant Page was the stunt coordinator on the film. He also served as a second unit director alongside producer Howard Grigsby.
