= Soccer Dreams =

Canadian reality television program

Soccer Dreams, a.k.a. Football Dreams, is a Canadian reality television programme that gives footballers ages 14–19 in North America the opportunity to win a contract with the Everton Football Club.

Based on the UK show Football Icon, Soccer Dreams tryouts began on June 29, 2007, in Toronto. Tryouts were also held in Montreal, Vancouver, Calgary and Winnipeg.

At each trial, a team of coaching staff, including Everton Football Club Academy Manager Ray Hall, whittled the trialists down to 36 competitors. On August 20, the final 36 reported back to Ottawa, where they played for the contract at the Oz Dome.

The show was produced by, amongst others, action film producer Jalal Merhi. Soccer Dreams debuted on June 7, 2008, on Fox Soccer Channel.

A spinoff was called American Soccer Star.
