= Tiger Claws =

1992 film by Kelly Makin

- U.S. video release poster
- Directed by: Kelly Makin
- Written by: J. Stephen Maunder
- Starring: Cynthia Rothrock; Jalal Merhi; Bolo Yeung; Mo Chow; Ho Chow
- Cinematography: Curtis Petersen
- Edited by: Reid Dennison
- Music by: Varouje Hagopian
- Production company: Film One Productions
- Distributed by: Cineplex Odeon Films (Canada); Shapiro-Glickenhaus Entertainment via MCA/Universal Home Video (U.S.)
- Release dates: May 29, 1992 (Canada); July 16, 1992 (U.S.)
- Running time: 92 minutes
- Country: Canada
- Language: English

Tiger Claws is a 1992 Canadian martial arts thriller film directed by Kelly Makin and starring Jalal Merhi, Cynthia Rothrock and Bolo Yeung. Merhi and Rothrock play New York cops investigating the serial killings of martial artists, which may be the work of a demented fighter (Yeung) looking to prove the superiority of his own style, the Tiger Claw. It was Makin's feature debut, and the first installment in an eponymous trilogy.

== Plot ==
Detective Linda Masterson, fed up with tackling street crimes, is assigned to a more exciting case: multiple martial artists have been found dead, their bodies bearing bloody gash marks, at the hand of a mysterious killer nicknamed the "Death Dealer". The reluctant Masterson is asked to cooperate with fellow NYPD member Tarek Richards. Although impulsive, Richards brings martial arts expertise to the case, and recognizes the wounds left on the victims are caused by the tiger claw, an violent brand of wushu which is said to drive its practitioners to the brink of insanity. Richards gave up the style due to its mental effects, but decides to resume training, feeling interactions with Chinese martial arts community could help him unearth the killer's identity.

He attends a martial arts tournament and asks around for a teacher in the tiger claw style. Yet, he is rebuffed by the secretive Chinese martial arts community. However, after he and Masterson save a young Chinese from being assaulted by some thugs, the victim consents to help them and directs them to an underground martial arts school located inside a closed cinema. Richards is initially turned down by the school, but due to his tutelage by respected master Mo Chow, is eventually granted admission. There, he meets the small group of students, one of which is likely to be the Death Dealer.

== Cast ==
- Cynthia Rothrock as Linda Masterson
- Jalal Merhi as Tarek Richards
- Bolo Yeung as Chong
- Mo Chow as Chow
- Ho Chow as James
- Robert Nolan as Roberts
- Kedar Brown as Vince
- John Webster as Reeves
- David Stevenson as Harris
- Gary Wong as Ming
- Bill Pickells as Himself
- Fern Figueiredo as Linda's Partner

== Production ==
=== Development and preliminary photography ===
Cineplex Odeon executive Jeff Sackman, who had bought Canadian rights to Merhi's first film Black Pearls, invited him to the 1990 Cannes Film Market to help him sell it internationally. There, Merhi was introduced to representatives of distributor Shapiro-Glickenhaus Entertainment. SGE wanted a bigger film than Black Pearls, so Merhi offered to bring back Bolo Yeung and add Cynthia Rothrock, a casual acquaintance from the competitive martial arts scene, with whom he had just reconnected at an industry function. SGE asked for a story treatment, which Merhi wrote on the spot. They also demanded some test footage of him with Rothrock, and then with Yeung. The first demo was made in October 1990. More preliminary filming took place in March 1991. The crowd scenes of "North America's Open Championship" were captured during the Ontario Provincial Open Martial Arts Championships, one of Canada's most storied tournaments, held that month at the Hamilton Convention Centre. A twenty-minute sizzle reel was cobbled together, which included a Rothrock training session originally meant for the film, but ultimately discarded.

SGE presented it to MCA/Universal, with whom they had recently inked a video output deal, and the major committed to providing half of the budget. Cinematographer Curtis Petersen of Vancouver, who also had a production services business, doubled as co-producer. Like Merhi, two of the film's associate producers, Norm Eizicovics and Ron Ishaik, had a background in Toronto's jewelry sector. When Black Pearls failed to make an impact upon its Spring 1991 Canadian release, some of Merhi's backers pulled out of Tiger Claws and he had to inject more of his own money to complete the budget. Part of the financing also relied on deferred salaries. Director Kelly Makin was selected after meeting Merhi during the post-production of Black Pearls, and made his feature debut.

=== Martial arts influences ===
J. Stephen Maunder, a student of Merhi's who had written part of Black Pearls, did not want to commit to a full screenplay, but the latter wanted a martial artist in charge, and chaperoned Maunder for about one month while he hammered it down." The story's crime elements were largely a means to an end as they needed to satisfy market demands, but truly aimed to showcase the comradery of martial arts. As in Black Pearls, they invited sporting acquaintances such as John Atkinson, Mo Chow (Merhi's kung fu teacher) Mo's brother Ho, Michael Bernardo, Wing Chun instructor Sunny Tang and fellow Chow student turned stuntman Dave Stevenson. Several played fictionalized versions of themselves. Bill Pickells, a friend of Merhi's and his Shotokan karate instructor, spoofed his own martial arts TV show, which aired on local cable. The Pennsylvania childhood of Rothrock's character is also based on the actress' real life background. The trophies seen in most scenes were actually from Merhi's personal collection.

=== Principal photography ===
Principal photography took place between June 24 and July 25, 1991, in the Toronto metropolitan area, which stood in for New York City for most of the runtime. A couple days of filming did take place in New York to get authentic establishing shots. Much of the picture was shot in Toronto's East End. The Donlands Theatre was used as the location of the fictional kung fu school, and as production headquarters due to its proximity with Merhi's real-world school. Shortly after, Merhi bought it outright to set up permanent studios for his company, Film One.

The first scene, where Rothrock poses as a hooker, was also the first one shot. The drug bust introducing Merhi's character was filmed in Acton at the abandoned Beardmore Tannery—once the largest in the country. It was the last one shot, and was apparently planned as the opening. Logistics did not allow the parts of the tournament scene involving Rothrock to be shot on location in Hamilton, so they were done on a set built inside the Donlands. Conversely, the final fight was going to be shot in the Donlands' rafters, but they were deemed structurally unsafe for this type of stress, and it was moved to a warehouse. Scenes set at a Long Island marina were actually shot at a pier in the Scarborough Bluffs. The film went slightly over budget, but Merhi made sure to run a tighter ship than he had on Black Pearls.

==== Fight scenes ====
Director Makin's his prior experience mostly consisted of TV comedy. As such, Merhi had a strong directorial input on the action scenes, but Makin remained invested in the proceedings. There was no action choreographer on the film, and the actors were expected to contribute their ideas, which left Rothrock unimpressed, coming off her Asian career. This was the first time she designed her own fights, and she tried to draw from her Hong Kong experience, as with the rope in the back alley scene. The final showdown between Merhi and Yeung was rushed in a single afternoon, which they tried to compensate with a lot of coverage. Bill Pickells performed his feats without trickery. The broken glass he stepped on was not candy glass, and he was really blindfolded when he slashed the watermelon. As nobody else wanted to do it, his own girlfriend served as his assistant. She suffered a light cut.

== Release ==
=== Pre-release ===
Tiger Claws was originally slated to open in Canada in October 1991. It was shown to industry professionals at the Fall American Film Market on October 22, 1991. SGE also represented it for international sales. MCA/Universal Home Video cross-promoted the film with Martial Law 2, another Rothrock vehicle they distributed. They were bundled on the same screener, and the actress introduced the trailer for each film on the other's consumer tape.

=== Theatrical ===
Tiger Claws opened on May 29, 1992, in Ottawa and Edmonton, before touring other Canadian markets through distributor Cineplex Odeon Films, arriving in Toronto on June 19.

=== Home video ===
The film was released on videocassette on July 16, 1992 in both Canada and the U.S. The Canadian tape was issued by Cineplex Odeon Video, while the U.S. video premiere came courtesy of SGE's partners MCA/Universal Home Video. Universal shipped 22,000 units of the film during its launch quarter, a standard number for a DTV release from a major distributor. MCA/Universal also issued the film on LaserDisc on July 23, 1992.

== Reception ==
Tiger Claws has received mixed-to-negative reviews from critics. Marc Horton of the Edmonton Journal heavily panned the film during its theatrical run. Of star Jalal Merhi, he wrote that "one would hope that this young man might find another line of work fairly quickly." Rather than the story's killer, he deemed that "the true mad man [...] is the poor sap who signed the cheques bank rolling this thing." He further complained that "the villain is pretty clear from he beginning", "the delivery of dialogue is halting and ponderous", and "[e]ven the fight scenes are awkwardly choreographed".

Lawrence Cohn of Variety found that Merhi "is a cold fish of a hero while Rothrock is stuck in a sidekick role", making it "a lesser effort" in her career. He added that Toronto "subs unconvincingly for the New York setting, though the pic is technically well-made" and would still "please diehard fans." Sister publications TV Guide and The Motion Picture Annual were unenthusiastic, writing that "[d]espite an admittedly ambitious plot, Tiger Claws suffers from being grounded in a bonehead cops-and-ninjas formula." They also criticized Merhi's self-aggrandizement in his final fight with Yeung, assessing that "it's just too clear whose side the filmmakers are on. The cop can defeat this giant with his hands cuffed—and he does [...] It's just too lopsided a contest for fans expecting a terrific tussle, and the treatment brings little allure to the vaunted tiger style."

Trevor Johnson of the British Film Institute's Sight and Sound magazine wrote that "Rothrock and Merhi are as nifty as ever, but the exposition and supporting players leave a lot to be desired." Joe Kane, the New York Daily News' resident genre columnist, opined that "[w]hile acting-wise, Cynthia and Jalal may not remind viewers of Meryl Streep and Jack Nicholson, both project a natural awkwardness that actually adds to their credibility and helps make them a highly watchable duo". He also found that Yeung made for "an excellent adversary" and that the film offered "surprising mileage" for its modest budget.

== Post-release ==
On May 3, 2024, the film received a screening in presence of Merhi and Makin at Toronto's Revue Cinema, as part of the venue's "Black Belt Cinema" series. On this occasion, some of the cut test footage was shown for the first time.

== Soundtrack ==
The score was composed by Varouje Hagopian, who had a group rock and for whom it was the first film work. It was mixed in mono. Parts of it were re-used for Fearless Tiger, an enhanced version of Merhi's first film Black Pearls, which was released in 1994.

== Sequels ==
The film was followed by Tiger Claws II (1996), and Tiger Claws III: The Final Conflict (1999). Rothrock and Merhi reprised their roles in both films, with Yeung also returning for the second one.
