= Bolo Yeung =

Hong Kong actor and martial artist (born 1946)

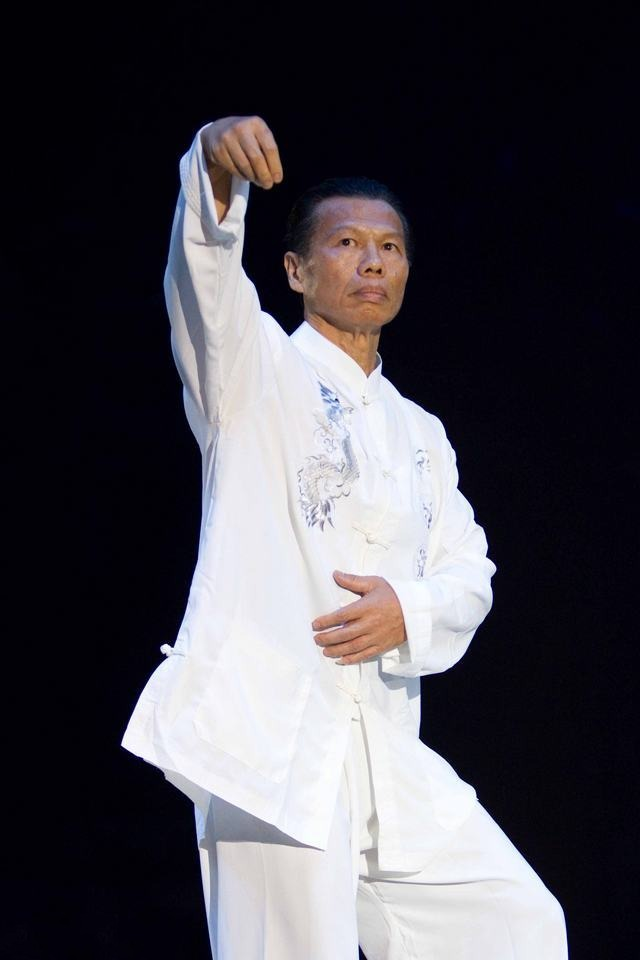
- Yeung in 2010
- Born: Yeung Sze; July 3, 1946 (age 80); Meizhou, Guangdong, Republic of China
- Native name: 楊斯
- Other names: Yang Si; Yang Sze; Chinese Hercules
- Height: 5 ft 8 in (173 cm)
- Years active: 1970–present

Other information
- Occupation: Actor; martial artist; bodybuilder
- Children: 3

Yeung Sze (simplified Chinese: 杨斯; traditional Chinese: 楊斯; Jyutping: joeng^{4} si^{1}; pinyin: Yáng Sī; born July 3, 1946), better known as Bolo Yeung, is a Hong Kong former competitive bodybuilder, martial artist, and actor. Famous for playing villains in action and martial arts films, he is regarded as one of the most influential actors in martial arts cinema.

Born in Meizhou, Sze learned kung fu, namely Tai chi and Wing Chun, from the age of 10. After relocating to Hong Kong to escape the famine and communism of mainland China, he developed an interest in bodybuilding and in 1970 he was crowned Mr. Hong Kong, a title he would hold for 10 years. He became an actor and stuntman for the Shaw Brothers with notable early performances in films including The Heroic Ones (1970) and The Deadly Duo (1971). In 1973, he appeared as the henchman "Bolo" in Bruce Lee's Enter the Dragon, which catapulted him to international fame. Throughout the 1970s and 1980s he appeared in many Bruceploitation films, including The Clones of Bruce Lee (1977) and Enter the Game of Death (1978). He made his directorial debut in 1977 with the film Fists of Justice.

He later appeared in Golden Harvest action comedies of the 1980s, including the Sammo Hung films My Lucky Stars (1985) and Millionaires Express (1986), and he duelled with Bruce Lee's son, Brandon Lee, in the action film Legacy of Rage (1986). He gained further popularity in the West following the international success of the 1988 martial arts film Bloodsport, in which he played the villain Chong Li, opposite Jean-Claude Van Damme. His work in Hollywood also includes the 1991 films Double Impact, also opposite Van Damme, and Breathing Fire, Ironheart (1992) and work with Lebanese-Canadian filmmaker Jalal Merhi, beginning with Fearless Tiger (1991).

== Biography ==
Yeung began his martial arts training at the age of 10 in Canton, where he trained under several kung fu masters. Growing up, he took an interest in bodybuilding, and later became Mr. Hong Kong bodybuilding champion. He held the title for ten years. Because of his muscular physique, he was chosen for several bad guy roles in films produced by Shaw Brothers Studios, such as The Heroic Ones, The Deadly Duo, Angry Guest and others.

Yeung met Bruce Lee while the two were filming a Winston cigarettes commercial. A friendship emerged and Lee invited him to star in Enter the Dragon, after which he became known as "Bolo", the name of the character he portrayed. The two became close friends during the filming of Enter the Dragon, during which Lee and Yeung worked very closely on technique training. Yeung once stated in an interview, many years after Lee's death, "There will never be another Bruce Lee; I am privileged to have had the honour of calling him my friend."

During the 1970s and 1980s, Yeung starred in numerous martial arts films, but his breakout film was Bloodsport. Shot on a US$1.5 million budget, it became a box office hit in the spring of 1988. Jean-Claude Van Damme had the leading role as Frank Dux, while Yeung played the role of Chong Li. A strong friendship formed between the two actors on the set of Bloodsport, and Van Damme invited Yeung to appear in his subsequent film Double Impact.

Canadian action film actor, director and producer Jalal Merhi met Yeung in Hong Kong while shooting his first film Fearless Tiger, then again on the set of Double Impact. Merhi was impressed with Yeung's personality and ability, and decided to create a part specifically for him. Later Merhi worked with Yeung on more films such as Tiger Claws, TC 2000 and Tiger Claws 2.

In 2007, Yeung made an appearance in Blizhniy Boy: The Ultimate Fighter. Merhi directed the first 60 minutes of the film that was shot in Toronto. Due to other commitments, he could not complete the remaining part of the film in Russia. Producer Erken Ialgashev directed the remainder of the film.

== Filmography ==
Year	Film	Role	Note(s)
2015	Diamond Cartel (a.k.a. The Whole World at Our Feet)	Bula	
2007	Blizhniy Boy: The Ultimate Fighter	Erik's Trainer	
1996	Tiger Claws II	Chong	
1996	Fists of Legends 2 Iron Bodyguards	Mongolian fighter	
1996	Shootfighter 2	Shingo	
1993	TC 2000	Master Sumai	
1993	Shootfighter: Fight to the Death	Shingo	
1992	Tiger Claws	Chong	
1992	Ironheart	"Ice"	
1992	Mega Force from Highland	The Wu Tang Swordsman	
1991	Fearless Tiger	Master on mountain	
1991	Double Impact	Moon	
1991	Breathing Fire	"Thunder"	Credited as Bolo Young
1989	Bloodfight	Chang Lee, The Vietnamese Cobra	
1988	Bloodsport	Chong Li	
1988	One Husband Too Many	Dung Ken, Muscleman	
1987	Killer's Nocturne	Pit fighter	
1987	To Err is Humane (a.k.a. To Err is Human)	Unknown	
1986	Legacy of Rage	Thug	
1986	Lucky Stars Go Places (a.k.a. Luckiest Stars)	Movie Patron	
1986	Millionaires Express (a.k.a. Shanghai Express)	Millionaire Chan	Uncredited, cameo
1985	Seven Angels	Bar Customer In Green Shirt	
1985	Bruce Lee's Dragons Fight Back	Unknown	
1985	My Lucky Stars	Millionaire Chan	
1985	Working Class (a.k.a. Hit Work Emperor)	Giant Kickboxer	
1985	Lucky Diamond (a.k.a. Wish You Good Luck)	Unknown	
1984	Silent Romance	Unknown	
1983	Just for Fun	Unknown	
1983	The Boxer's Omen (a.k.a. Mo)	Mr. Bu Bo, The Thai Boxer	
1982	The Supergang	"Big King"	
1982	The Ninja Strikes Back (a.k.a. Bruce Le Fights/Strikes Back or Eye of the Dragon)	Unknown	
1981	All the Wrong Clues (for the Right Solution)	Unknown	
1980	Way of the Dragon 2 (a.k.a. Bruce Le's Greatest Revenge)	Unknown	Credited as Yang Sze
1980	36 Deadly Styles	Cheung's Brother	
1980	Bruce, the King of Kung Fu (a.k.a. The Young Bruce Lee)	Unknown	
1980	Fearless Master (a.k.a. Fearless Hyena 3)	Unknown	Credited as Yang Sze
1980	Challenge of the Tiger (a.k.a. Dragon Bruce Le or Gymkata Killer)	Unknown	Credited as Yang Sze
1980	Invincible (a.k.a. Fighting Dragon)	Unknown	
1980	Treasure of Bruce Lee (a.k.a. King Boxer 2)	Unknown	
1979	Bruce the Superhero	Peter Sze, The Bullkiller	Credited as Yang Sze
1979	Ruthless Revenge (a.k.a. Invincible Kung Fu or The Two Tricky Kids)	Unknown	
1979	The Dragon, the Hero (a.k.a. Dragon on Fire)	Unknown	
1979	Enter Three Dragons (a.k.a. Three Avengers)	Bolo	
1979	The Fists, the Kicks, and the Evil	Master Lung	
1979	Snake Deadly Act	The Giant	
1979	Writing Kung Fu	Ah Yen	Credited as Yang Sze
1979	Bolo (a.k.a. Bolo the Brute)	Bolo	Credited as Yang Sze
1978	Enter the Game of Death (a.k.a. Cross Hands Martial Arts or The King of Kung Fu)	Yang See	
1978	Enter Three Dragons	Bolo	
1978	Bruce Li in New Guinea	Unknown	
1978	Amsterdam Connection	Louie "Big Louie"	Credited as Yang Sze
1978	The Tattoo Connection (a.k.a. Black Belt Jones 2)	Tan Yu Lu's Henchman	
1978	The Image of Bruce Lee (a.k.a. Storming Attacks)	Kimura	
1977	10 Magnificent Killers	Ling Chu	Credited as Yang Sze
1977	The Clones of Bruce Lee	Martial Arts Trainer	
1977	Bruce and Shaolin Kung Fu (a.k.a. Bruce vs Black Dragon)	Lam Chi Chu	
1977	Soul of Chiba	Nepal	Credited as Yang Sze
1976	A Queen's Ransom (a.k.a. International Assassin(s))	Ram	
1975	Hong Kong Superman (a.k.a. Bruce: Hong Kong Master)	Unknown	
1975	Kung Fu Massacre	Unknown	Credited as Yang Sze
1975	G-Men '75	Unknown	TV series
1975	He Loved Once Too Many	Unknown	Credited as Bolo Yang Sze
1975	All Men Are Brothers (a.k.a. Seven Soldiers of Kung Fu)	Si Xingfang	
1975	The Fighting Dragon	Red Tiger	TV series
1974	Super Kung Fu Kid	Tiger	Credited as Yang Sze
1973	Chinese Hercules	Chinese Hercules	
1973	Thunderkick	Unknown	
1973	Kung Fu's Hero	Unknown	Credited as Yang Sze
1973	Enter the Dragon	Bolo	Credited as Yang Sze
1973	Freedom Strikes A Blow	Chiang Tai	Credited as Yang Sze
1973	Greatest Thai Boxing	Unknown	
1973	Tiger	Unknown	
1973	Ninja Killer	Mr. Yang	Credited as Yang Sze
1972	Man of Iron (a.k.a. Iron Man or Warrior of Steel)	Jin Xi Fu	
1972	Trilogy of Swordsmanship	Unknown	
1972	Young People	Unknown	
1972	King Boxer (a.k.a. Five Fingers of Death)	Pa Tu Er, Mongolian Fighter	
1972	The 14 Amazons	Western Xia Wrestler	
1972	Angry Guest	Yang Sze	
1971	The Rescue	Chief Cha Te	
1971	The Lady Professional	Bald Killer	
1971	The Oath of Death	Officer Shi	
1971	The Deadly Duo	The River Dragon of Jin	
1970	The Heroic Ones	General Meng Juehai	
1970	The Wandering Swordsman	Unicorn Du Kuo Lung	
