= Talons of the Eagle =

- Directed by: Michael Kennedy
- Written by: J. Stephen Monder
- Produced by: Jalal Merhi; Dale Hildebrand; Curtis Petersen
- Starring: Billy Blanks; Jalal Merhi; James Hong; Priscilla Barnes
- Cinematography: Curtis Petersen
- Edited by: Reid Dennison
- Music by: VaRouje
- Production company: Film One
- Distributed by: Shapiro Glickenhaus Entertainment (United States); Cineplex Odeon Films (Canada)
- Release date: November 6, 1992
- Running time: 96 minutes
- Country: United States
- Language: English

Talons of the Eagle is a 1992 American martial arts action film starring Billy Blanks, Jalal Merhi, Matthias Hues and James Hong and directed by Michael Kennedy. It received a limited release on November 6, 1992, and was released on video on December 23, 1992.

== Plot summary ==
After three DEA agents are killed by crime boss Mr. Li (Hong), the DEA reluctantly calls in New York cop and martial arts expert Tyler Wilson (Blanks) and sends him to Toronto, on undercover assignment, to team up with Canadian vice cop Michael Reed (Merhi). Because Tyler and Michael must infiltrate Li's gang, they enter a martial arts tournament that Li is known to attend to recruit talent. Preparing for the tournament, they train with legendary Master Pan Qingfu, who teaches them the art of 'eagle claw'. Pan's son was killed by Li, so he seeks revenge and agrees to teach them.

At the tournament, Tyler and Michael impress Li and end up saving him from being killed by a rival crime boss. Li invites the two to join his staff, therefore granting them access to his operation. While undercover, working as security at Li's illegal gambling facility, they discover that another undercover agent, Cassandra (Priscilla Barnes), has already infiltrated Li's organization. They must, then, verify if she has defected, as she hasn't reported to her commanding officer in three weeks. Michael determines Cassandra hasn't switched sides and the three uncover Li's plot to blackmail a local politician into waiving extradition for one of Li's criminal associates, Fong Wai Hut.

During a drug deal, Michael is arrested, then bailed by Li and brought to interrogation, as Li's right-hand man Khan (Hues) learns Michael is a cop. In the final showdown, Michael escapes and helps Tyler and Pan battle Li, Khan and their army of henchmen, before destroying the entire Li empire.

In the end, the duo are congratulated by their captain and make the sign of the eagle claw.

== Cast ==
- Jalal Merhi as Michael Reed
- Billy Blanks as Tyler Wilson
- James Hong as Mr. Li
- Priscilla Barnes as Cassandra
- Pan Qingfu as Master Pan
- Matthias Hues as Khan
- Harry Mok as Niko
- Gary "Si-Jo" Foo as Fong Wai Hut

== Production ==
The movie was shot in Toronto, Ontario, Canada between April 23, 1992 and May 21, 1992, and was made by production companies Film One Productions and Shapiro-Glickenhaus Entertainment.

== Release ==
It received a short theatrical release in Canada by Cineplex Odeon Films.

== Home media ==
The film was distributed on VHS in 1992 by MCA/Universal Home Video (USA) and that same year by Cineplex-Odeon Home Video and MCA Home Video. Since then it has been distributed by numerous companies on VHS and DVD including a 1999 Home Video release from Alliance Atlantis in Canada and receiving 2 DVD releases. The first DVD was released in the United States by 20th Century Fox in 2004 and in 2005 in Canada by Legacy Entertainment.

== Brazilian parody ==
In 2007, the movie was featured in Tela Class, a comedic redubbing segment of Hermes e Renato's show on MTV Brasil. Tales of the Eagle became 'Garras de Baitola' (lit. 'Sissy Claws'), in which the two main characters were implied to be a couple who worked as bouncers in a chinese-owned club. It is implied that Billy Blanks' character was Pelé.

== Soundtrack ==
- "Talons of the Eagle" — Written and performed by Jonas J. Patricko
- "Don't Make Me Mad Son" — Written by Ryan Lord and Darren Hill, performed by Top Secret, Dee Rhythm Music
- "Lay Your Money Down" — Written and performed by Britton, lyrics by Murray Plichta
