= The U-Krew =

American hip hop group

- Also known as: The Untouchable Krew
- Origin: Portland, Oregon, United States
- Genres: New jack swing
- Years active: 1984–1990
- Label: Enigma Records
- Past members: Kevin Morse (deceased 2014); Larry Bell (deceased 2011); Lavell Alexander; James McClendon; Hakim Rashad Muhammad

The U-Krew was an American R&B/hip-hop music quintet from Portland, Oregon, that saw its greatest success in 1990. The members of the U-Krew were Kevin Morse (lead vocals), Larry Bell (producer, keyboard/drum programmer), Lavell Alexander (turntables), James McClendon, and Hakim Rashad Muhammad (rap vocals). They were originally billed as The Untouchable Krew when they were formed in October 1984.

They were the group to bring attention to the overlooked and less prominent Portland rap scene. They began to form when McClendon and Muhammad participated in, then won rap battles around their hometown in the mid 1980s. They then met Bell while he was spinning records at a Halloween party. He had the special trick of playing a live drum machine with his fingertips on top of a record, which amazed McClendon. After they commenced making music together, turntablist Alexander and singer Morse were added to the fold. Their works attracted some attention and airplay on the radio station, KBOO, but they had a hard time finding clubs that played hip-hop. They solved that problem once they signed for an open mic night at one club called Satyricon. The guys managed to gain some opening slots and one night, while opening for a band called Shock, a boss from Enigma Records approached them, giving them his business card, offering them a deal. But they were not so sure if they should have taken him seriously, as he was drunk and they heard that line on the regular.

With the lucrativeness that Enigma had with the hair-metal band, Poison, and the band's debut album, Look What the Cat Dragged In, the U-Krew were convinced, flew to Los Angeles to sign that deal, and their debut/only album of their namesake was released on October 5, 1989. The album went to No. 92 on the Billboard 200. It spawned three singles. The premier single, "If U Were Mine", went as high as No. 24 on the Billboard Hot 100 and No. 46 on Billboard's Hot Dance Music/Maxi-Singles Sales chart. The second, "Let Me Be Your Lover", reached No. 68 on the Billboard Hot 100 and No. 81 on Billboard's Hot Black Singles chart. The third and last, "Ugly", had no chart success. However, it was featured in the cult sci-fi film, I Come in Peace. Once their promotional tour was finished, they achieved airplay in the South, then nationally. They then flew from Portland to Atlanta, Georgia, to get on a tour bus and opened for bigger-named acts. At one point, they were booked to perform on The Arsenio Hall Show, but due to a scheduling conflict, they were forced to choose that or MTV's Downtown Julie Brown, and ultimately they went with the latter. Following witnessing headliner MC Hammer at a show in Boston taking a pair of his dancers' credentials, and giving them to two girls who could not get into the show, the U-Krew also gave away their credentials, following his example. Within a couple years, the group began having difficulty with contacting anyone at Enigma. This was due to the label preparing to fold as a result of the executives splurging following Poison's success. The U-Krew were in the midst of making a second album and tried getting a new deal from Capitol Records, which happened to be Enigma's distributor. That fell through and after trying to get another new deal with a third and the last record company, the U-Krew also folded.

McClendon is a restauranteur and co-owner of a restaurant called Mack & Dub's Excellent Chicken and Waffles in Northeast Portland. Muhammad is a music teacher and owner of a production company. He and McClendon had also formed a duo under the names, Hakim and J-Mack. They released one album, Playalistic, in 1999 through the local label, Lucky Records. Alexander became a designer for Adidas sneakers. On February 4, 2011, Bell murdered his girlfriend, then committed suicide. The surviving members briefly reunited, playing a show in their hometown, and being inducted into the 2012 Oregon Music Hall of Fame. Morse died exactly three years to the day after Bell, his cause unknown.

== Discography ==
=== Albums ===
- 1989: The U-Krew (Enigma) – No. 92 Billboard 200

=== Singles ===
- 1990: "If U Were Mine" – No. 24 Billboard Hot 100, No. 46 Billboard's Hot Dance Music/Maxi-Singles Sales
- 1990: "Let Me Be Your Lover" – No. 68 Billboard Hot 100, No. 81 Billboard's Hot Black Singles
- 1990: "Ugly"
