= Steve Anderson (karate) =

Karaeta

Steve "Nasty" Anderson (March 29, 1955 - January 24, 2020) was a Canadian-American Point Fighting and Sport Karate competitor. Anderson appeared on the covers and in articles in many martial arts magazines. Various sources list different numbers, but On Point magazine claimed he won 10 world titles. Anderson was a karate kempo stylist and was a Black Belt magazine 1982 Competitor of the year. Anderson got involved in karate in 1969 and received the nickname Nasty from his instructor Chicken Gabriels mother. One of his students was James Benjamin Stewart.

== Competition ==
Anderson was famous for his backfist and blitz attack and as a brown belt won 92 consecutive tournaments. He fought well known individuals like Kevin Thompson and one of his primary rivals was Ray McCallum. Steve Curran has referred to Anderson as being their toughest opponent.

Anderson stood at 6'3, 210 lbs and was a member of the Black Karate Federation.

== Death ==
Since mid-2018, Anderson’s health had been gradually deteriorating as he had been battling Parkinson's disease undetected, notably losing his speech, strength, and balance over the course of 2 years. In 2019, a neurologist confirmed that Anderson had suffered from a stroke a year prior in 2018. Anderson’s health began to rapidly worsen in late-2019. On January 24, 2020, Anderson had died at his home in the Ottawa, Ontario.
