= Billy Blanks =

American actor, martial artist and fitness guru (b. 1955)

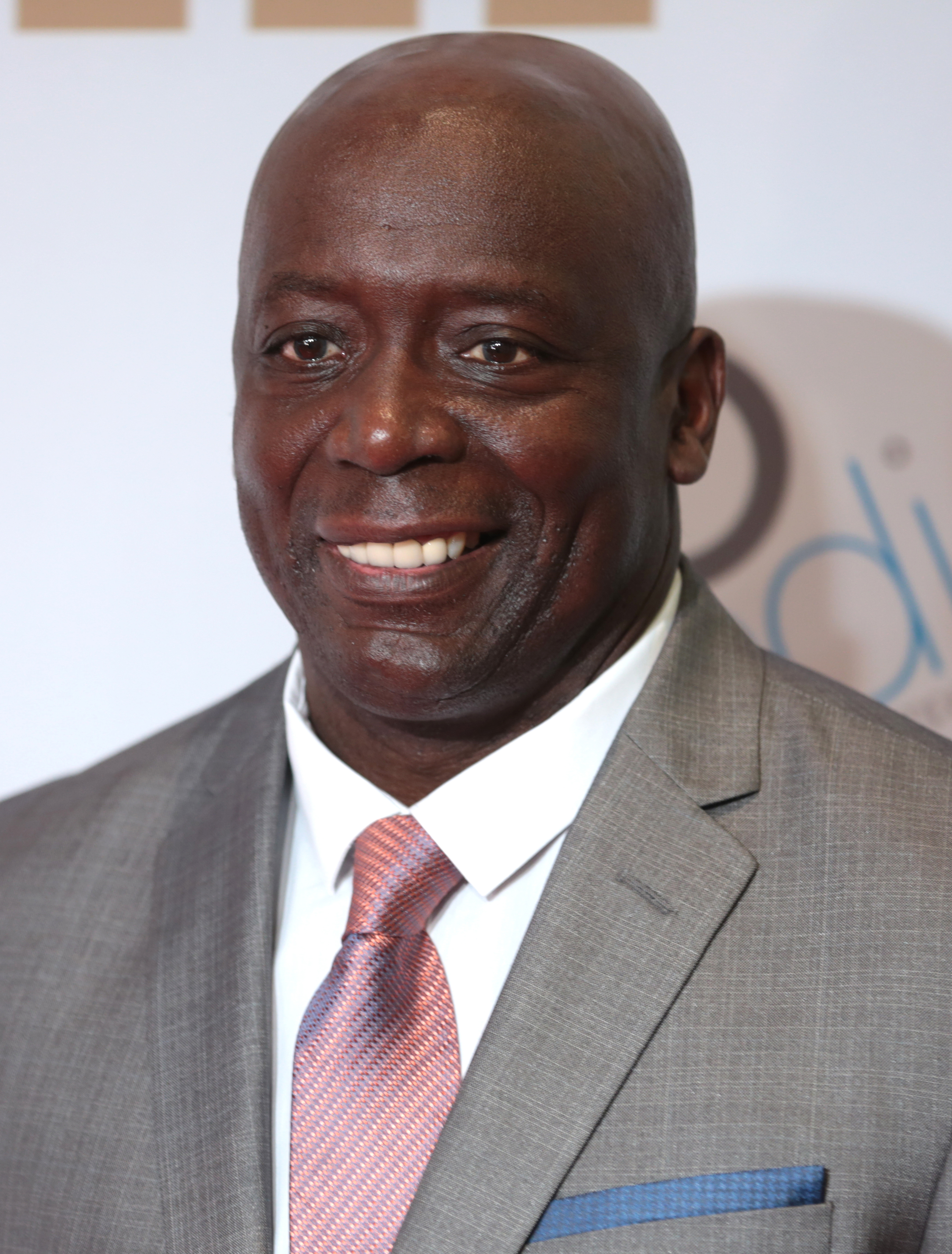
- Blanks in 2017
- Born: William Wayne Blanks; September 1, 1955 (age 71); Erie, Pennsylvania, U.S.
- Occupations: Actor, martial artist, boxer, fitness personality
- Years active: 1981–present
- Spouses: Gayle H. Godfrey (m. 1974; div. 2008) Tomoko Sato (m. 2009)
- Children: 5, including Billy Jr.
- Martial arts career
- Style: Taekwondo; Gōjū-ryū karate; Hung Ga
- Team: Atlantic World Karate (formerly)
- Teachers: Park Jong Soo; Wong Ting Fong; Chuck Merriman

William Wayne Blanks (born September 1, 1955) is an American actor, martial artist, and fitness personality. He was a nationally ranked competitor in semi-contact and point karate during the 1980s, winning a bronze medal at the 1981 World Games, before creating the Tae Bo exercise program.

== Early life and education ==
Blanks was born in Erie, Pennsylvania. He began his study of the martial arts at the age of eleven, attending Karate and Taekwondo classes. He was born with an anomaly in his hip joints that impaired his movement. The resulting clumsiness aroused taunts from Blanks' siblings and led his instructors to believe that he would never accomplish much. Blanks found the answer to these challenges in karate. When he saw Bruce Lee on TV, he decided he wanted to be a world martial-arts champion.

== Martial arts ==
Blanks holds black belt ranks in taekwondo (7th dan) and karate (5th dan), and a black sash in Hung Ga kung fu (under Sifu Wong Ting-fong).

During the 1980s, Blanks was a top competitor on the point competition, semi-contact, and sport karate circuits, notably against Steve Anderson. He finished in 3rd place at the World Union of Karate-do Organizations (WUKO) World Championship in the Male Kumite category in 1980. He represented the United States at the 1981 World Games in Santa Clara, California, and won a bronze medal in the Men's Kumite Open (Heavyweight). He was Karate Illustrated magazine's National Champion and Rookie of the Year for 1983.

Blanks was an early member of USA Karate, the precursor to USA National Karate-do Federation, after it broke away from the Amateur Athletic Union. He also was a member of Chuck Merriman's Atlantic World Karate Team with Anderson.

== Career ==
Blanks was hired as a bodyguard for lead actress Catherine Bach during the filming of 1988's Driving Force, which was filmed in Manila during a time of political unrest. Blanks impressed the producers and was written into the script in a supporting role. This led to Blanks' work in several martial arts films, including King of the Kickboxers and Bloodfist. Blanks also appeared in the opening scene of Tony Scott's The Last Boy Scout, where he plays a doomed pro-football player. Blanks played Ashley Judd's kickboxing instructor in Kiss the Girls (1997).

In the late 1980s, Blanks developed the Tae Bo workout, while running a karate studio in Quincy, Massachusetts. He used components of his martial arts and boxing training. The name is a portmanteau of tae (as in taekwondo) and bo (as in boxing). Blanks opened a fitness center in Los Angeles to teach his new workout. He later attracted celebrity clients such as Paula Abdul, and the popularity of the workout quickly grew, becoming a pop culture phenomenon after Blanks began releasing mass-marketed videos. He sold over 1.5 million VHS tapes in his first year, and is reported to have grossed between $80 million and $130 million in sales.

== Personal life ==
Blanks is a Christian and released a special line of Tae Bo workouts called the "Believer's" series that includes motivational prayers and other Christian components. He has appeared on the Christian television network TBN. He attended Crenshaw Christian Center.

In 1974, Blanks married Gayle H. Godfrey, whom he met in karate class. Shortly after the marriage, he adopted Gayle's daughter, Shellie, who was born in 1973. Shellie Blanks Cimarosti, a martial artist, is prominently featured in many Tae Bo videos. Shellie has also produced her own video called Tae Bo Postnatal Power, as well as hosted her father's new infomercial Tae Bo T3 (Total Transformation Training). Gayle and Blanks also have a son, Billy Blanks Jr., who works as a fitness instructor. Blanks Jr. produced several best-selling DVDs, including Cardioke and Fat Burning Hip Hop Mix. He has also starred in a touring production of the musical Fame, and has worked as a dancer in music videos with Madonna, Quincy Jones and Paula Abdul.

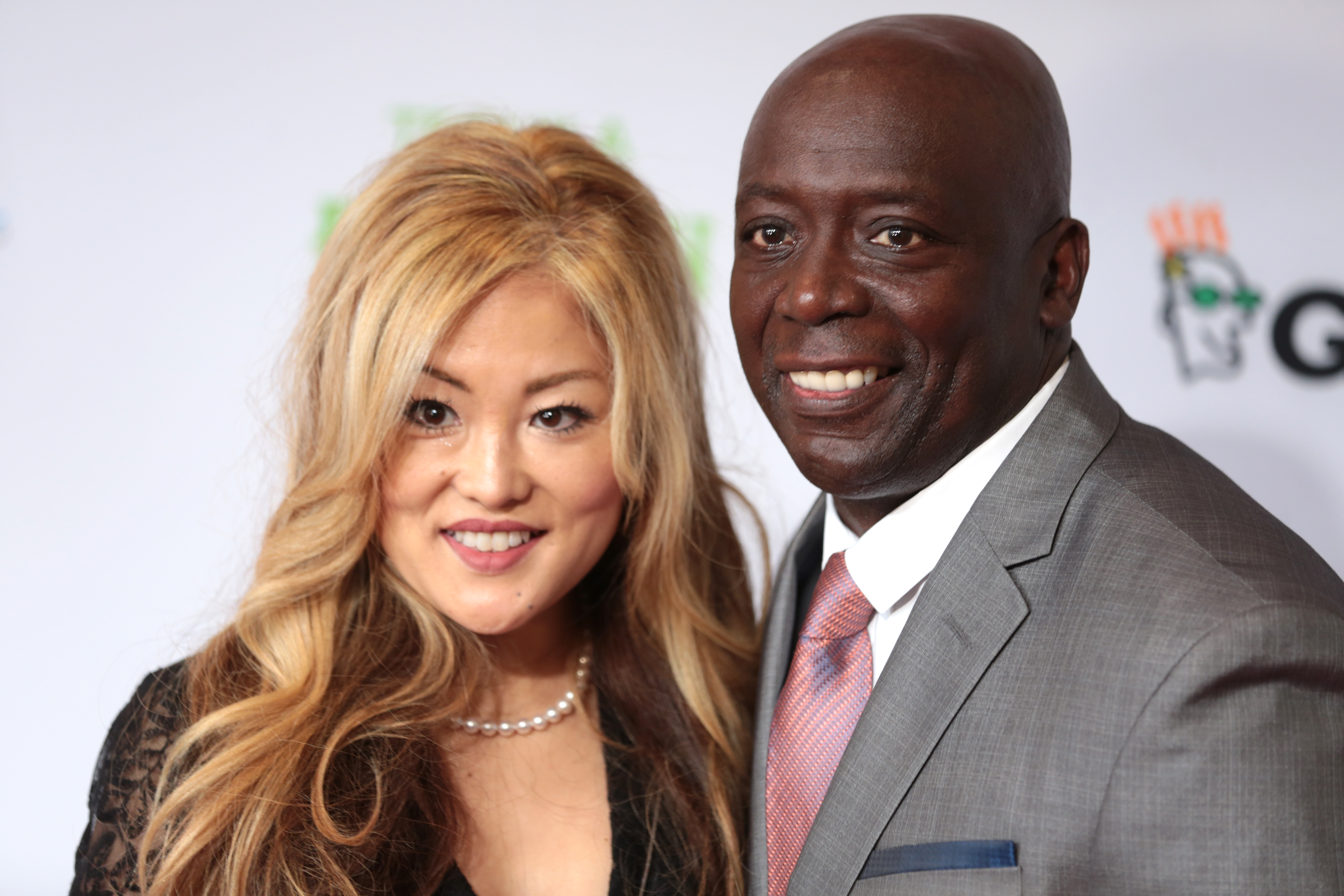
Tomoko Sato (left) and Blanks in 2017

Blanks and Godfrey divorced in 2008 after 33 years of marriage. Godfrey filed for divorce, citing irreconcilable differences.

In November 2008, Blanks became the father of a new daughter, named Angelika. The mother is Tomoko Sato, whom Blanks met in 2007 when she worked as his Japanese interpreter. Blanks and Sato's marriage was formally registered in January 2009 and their wedding ceremony was held on June 20, 2009. He relocated to Japan in 2009.

== Filmography ==
=== Film ===
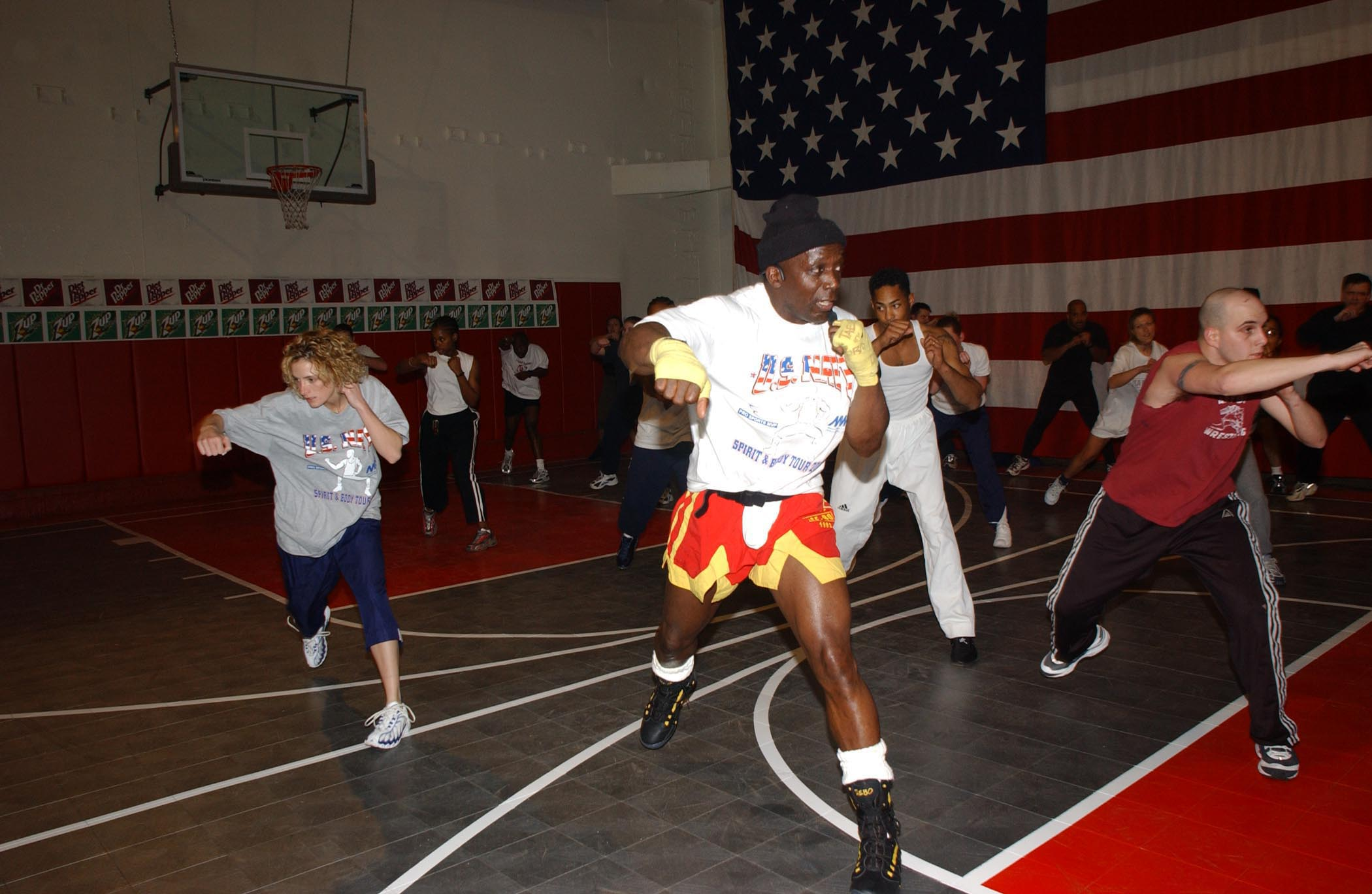
Blanks on board USS La Salle in January 2002

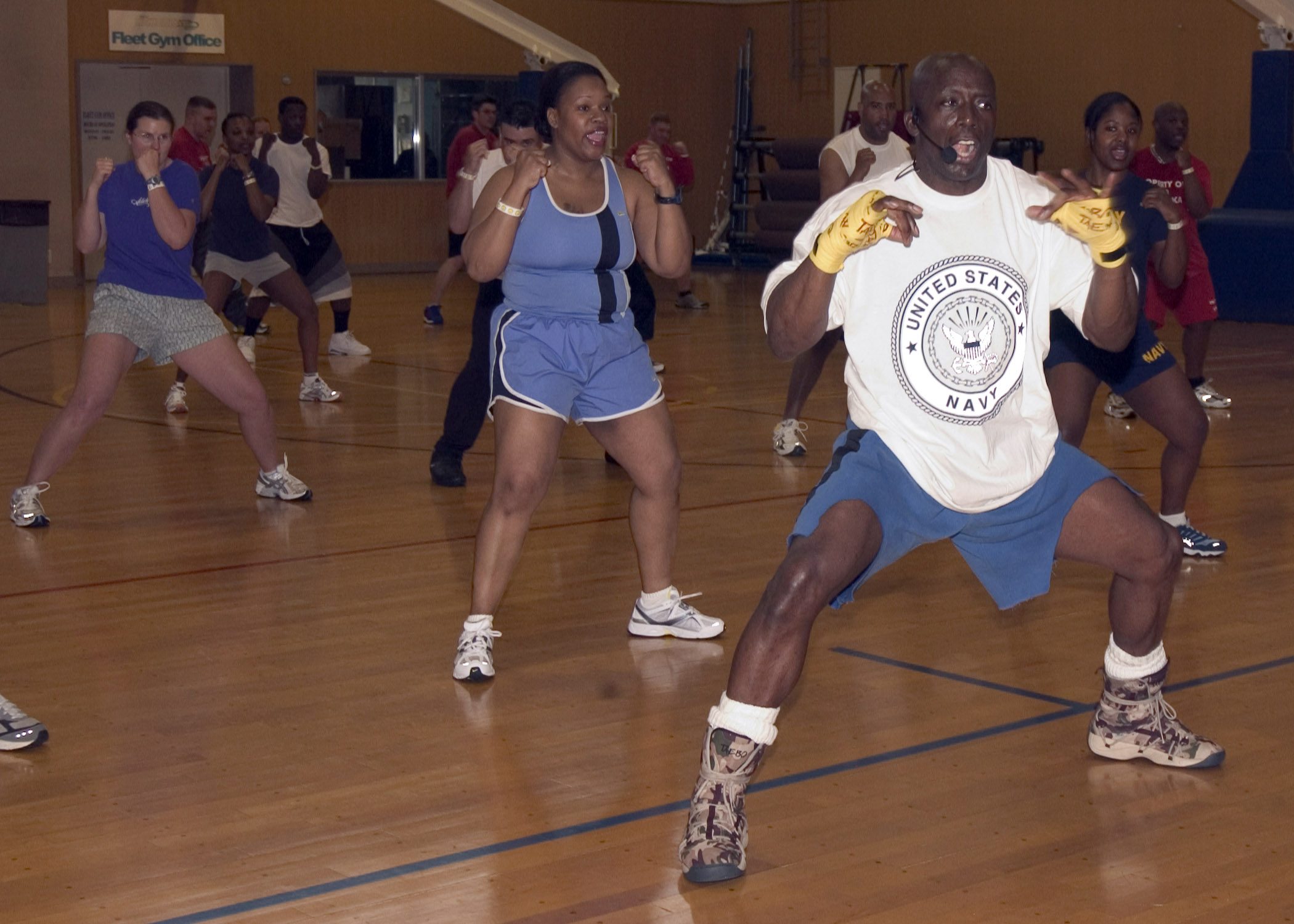
Blanks in US Military Base in Yokosuka, Japan, in April 2006

Film performances
Year	Title	Role	Notes
1986	Low Blow	Guard	Film debut role
1988	Driving Force	Pool	
1989	Tango & Cash	Prison Thug	Uncredited
1989	Bloodfist	Black Rose	
1990	The King of the Kickboxers	Khan	
1990	China O'Brien II	Baskin's Fighter #1	Uncredited
1990	Lionheart	African Legionnaire	
1991	The Last Boy Scout	Billy Cole	
1991	Timebomb	Mr. Brown	
1992	Zhan long zai ye	Billy	
1992	Talons of the Eagle	Tyler Wilson	
1992	The Master	Black Thug	Uncredited
1993	Showdown	Billy Grant	
1993	TC 2000	Jason Storm	
1993	Back in Action	Billy	
1994	A Dangerous Place	Billy	
1995	Expect No Mercy	Agent Justin Vanier	
1995	Tough and Deadly	John Portland	
1996	Balance of Power	Niko	
1997	Kiss the Girls	Kickboxing Instructor	
2007	Dance Club: The Movie	Dance Club Dancer	Short film
2011	Jack and Jill	Himself	Cameo role; Golden Raspberry Award for Worst Screen Ensemble
2017	The Clapper	Himself	Cameo role
2024	The Last Kumite	Loren	

=== Television ===
Television performances
Year	Title	Role	Notes
1987	Spenser: For Hire	Man Fighting On The Street	Episode: "Heart of the Matter"; Uncredited
1989	Kids Incorporated	Billy	Episode: "Karate Kids"
1992	Street Justice	Tsiet Na Champion	Episode: "Circle of Death"
1994	Sister, Sister	Driver	Episode: "Love Strikes"
1996	Muppets Tonight	Dancing Muppet	Episode: "Paula Abdul"
1997	Assault on Devil's Island	Creagan	Television film
1998	ER	Kickboxing Instructor	Episode: "The Storm (Part I)"
1999	Sunset Beach	Billy	Episodes: "605, 606"; Uncredited
1999	The Parkers	Himself	Episode: "Taking Tae-Bo with My Beau"; Special guest star
1999	Sabrina the Teenage Witch	Himself	Episode: "Prelude to a Kiss"; Special guest star
2003	The Fairly OddParents	Himself	Episode: "Kung Timmy"; Special guest voice

=== Music video ===
Music video performances
Year	Title	Artist	Role	Refs.
2022	"Light Switch"	Charlie Puth	Tae Bo Instructor	
