= Tae Bo =

American martial art

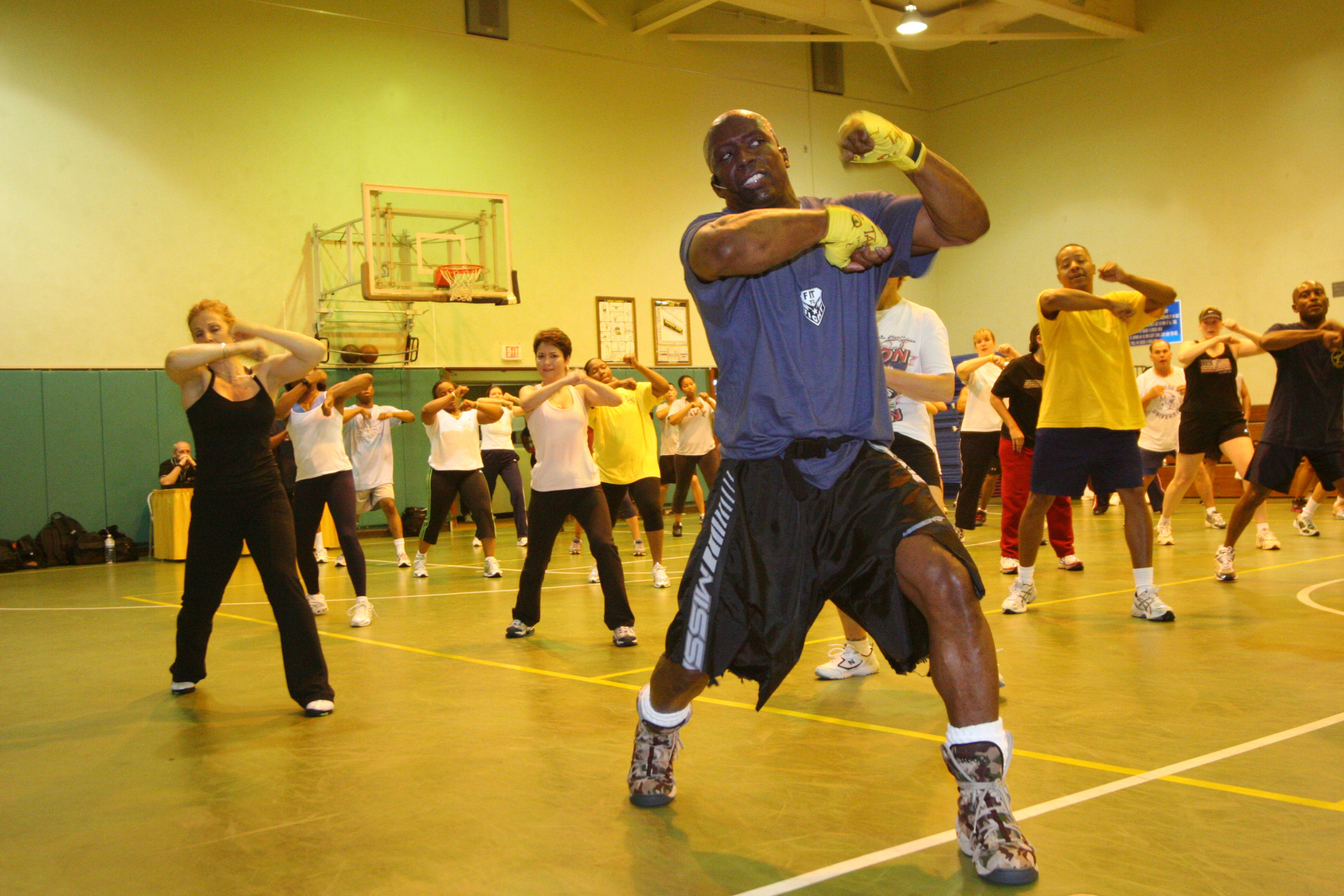
Tae Bo creator Billy Blanks, leading a class

Tae Bo is a body fitness system that incorporates martial arts techniques, such as stances, kicks and punches as well as traditional choreography. It became popular in the 1990s. This fitness system was developed by American taekwondo, karate, and boxing practitioner Billy Blanks. Such programs use the motions of martial arts at a rapid pace designed to promote fitness. The name Tae Bo is a blend of taekwondo and boxing.

== History ==
Billy Blanks developed the routine in 1976 by combining dance with elements from his martial arts and boxing training to form a workout regimen. During the 1990s, a series of videos was mass-marketed to the public; by 1999, an estimated 1.5 million sets of videos had been sold by frequently-aired television infomercials. As a result, Tae Bo became something of a pop culture phenomenon in the late 1990s. Gyms began offering kickboxing-based fitness classes similar to Tae Bo. Since Blanks had obtained a trademark on the name they were not allowed to use the term Tae Bo without paying a licensing fee. Tae Bo videos and DVDs continue to rank among the top sellers in the fitness genre and derivative classes are still offered at many gyms.

Tae Bo classes are taught worldwide. The routines include many of the same punches and kicks as karate, but is not developed for any combat or self-defense activities. There are no throws, grappling moves, or ground fighting techniques in Tae Bo. The only goal is to increase fitness through movement. Routines also include aerobic exercises intended to strengthen all muscles of the body with basic choreography. The high-intensity workout is intended to increase cardiovascular fitness, strength, muscular endurance, and flexibility.

== Benefits ==
Tae Bo has been characterized as an excellent cardiovascular workout.

Due to the movements it involves, it can also improve one's balance, flexibility, and coordination. According to Blanks, the cardiovascular benefits are a result of the dance moves added to the already high-energy workout. An hour-long Tae Bo workout will burn 500 to 800 calories, compared with the 300 to 400 calories burned with a more conventional aerobics class.
