= Cineplex Odeon Films =

Motion picture distribution unit

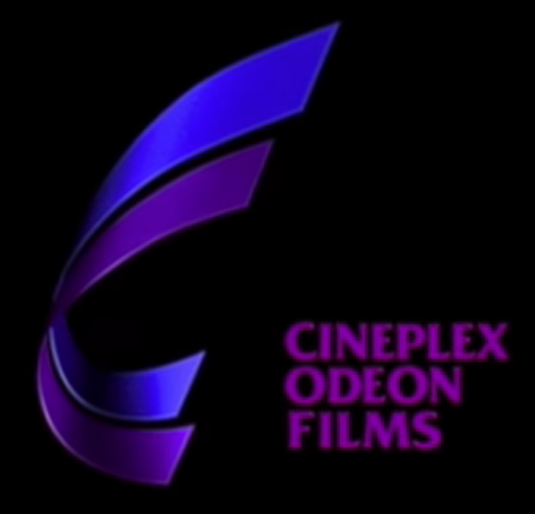
- Type: Private
- Industry: Entertainment (movie theaters)
- Founded: April 1978; 48 years ago
- Defunct: May 1998; 28 years ago
- Fate: Parent company merged with Sony Loews Theatres to form Loews Cineplex Entertainment, which eventually folded into AMC Theatres. Canadian operations spun-off
- Successors: Entertainment One; AMC Theatres; SP Media Group
- Headquarters: Toronto, Ontario, Canada
- Key people: Garth Drabinsky and Nat Taylor
- Parent: Cineplex Odeon Corporation

Cineplex Odeon Films (later known as Odeon Films) was the film distribution unit of the Canadian cinema chain Cineplex Odeon Corporation. The company was originally named Pan-Canadian Film Distributors. In 1998, the company was purchased by Alliance Communications, whose film unit was merged into Alliance Atlantis, split from the company in 2007 as Alliance Films, and folded into Entertainment One, currently a subsidiary of Lionsgate Studios.

== History ==
The company began in 1979 as Pan-Canadian Film Distributors, a partnership between film producer Garth Drabinsky and inventor Nat Taylor, based in Toronto, Ontario. At the time of its establishment in the United States, the Cineplex Odeon theatre chain and the tie-in studio were owned by the MCA entertainment group, also the then-owners of Universal Pictures. On August 27, 1986, Pan-Canadian renamed itself as Cineplex Odeon Films, and began operations at Los Angeles, California in November 1986; Garth Drabinsky became its chief officer. Cineplex Odeon Films made its first film to American screens, which was The Decline of the American Empire, produced by Rene Malo.

The distribution branch then underwent a restructuring shortly afterwards, in order to turn the company into a U.S.-based subsidiary of the firm, with headquarters in Century City, with regional offices in New York City, Chicago and other markets, and the new Canadian division of the studio would start operating out of the new Cineplex Odeon corporate headquarters in Canada, and the turf included licensing of films on home video, pay TV and theatrical distribution. In late 1987, it formed a partnership with Robert Redford's production company Wildwood Enterprises, Inc. by setting up Northfolk Productions, for combining the production of both pictures with budgets less than $5 million, and has plans to produce at least five films for the next five years between the average budget of $4–5 million. By 1990, it was Canada's largest independent film distribution company.

On October 22, 1987, Cineplex Odeon created yet another subsidiary, that of the television division, Cineplex Odeon Television Productions, whose first offerings included 41 then-new episodes of the anthology series Alfred Hitchcock Presents, set for the USA Network in 1988, in association with MCA TV (they were seen in Canada on the Global Television Network). David J. Patterson became senior vice president of the Cineplex Odeon television division.

The company briefly served in the U.S. as a de-facto arthouse arm of Universal Pictures in the mid-to-late 1980s after Universal Classics folded, due to MCA owning a stake in Cineplex Odeon, eventually stopped distributing films in 1989 and it was not until 1992 that Universal entered into the arthouse business again by partnering with PolyGram Filmed Entertainment in the distribution company Gramercy Pictures to serve the US market.

In December 1993, it was announced by Michael Herman (Cineplex Odeon Films Canada Senior Vice President of Corporate Affairs) that as part of a corporate restructuring, Bryan Gliserman had been appointed to the role of Senior Vice President of Corporate Affairs effective January 17, 1994. Gliserman would oversee all of Cineplex Odeon Films operations, and would be responsible for the maintenance and improvement of Cineplex Odeon Films distribution services. Gliserman would also build relationships with key suppliers like Columbia/Tri-Star, Savoy Pictures and Gramercy Pictures. Prior to his promotion, Gliserman had spent 17 years in the Canadian film industry. He had experience with development, financing, production, distribution and exhibition posts with a wide variety of organization.

Later in the 1990s, it changed its name to Odeon Films on account of its historic significance, before releasing one of their final films—the science-fiction film Cube (released in American markets under Trimark Pictures' banner).

In early 1998, 75% of Cineplex Odeon Films was sold to Alliance Communications for CA$5 million, shortly before it merged with Atlantis Communications into Alliance Atlantis. The remaining 25% was donated to a foundation representing Canada's film schools. The sale took place as Cineplex Odeon Corporation was sold to Sony's Loews Theaters to form Loews Cineplex Entertainment. The sale was partly due to a Canadian law that forbids foreign companies from owning domestic distributors as the company was no longer Canadian.

The Cineplex Odeon Films library is currently copyrighted to Lionsgate Studios (through Entertainment One) and AMC Theatres, with SP Media Group owning distribution rights outside Canada.

== Film history ==
Notable films from Cineplex Odeon's early days include The Glass Menagerie, The Last Temptation of Christ, Prancer, The Grifters, Mr. & Mrs. Bridge, Madame Sousatzka, Jacknife, the Prince concert film Sign o' the Times, The Decline of the American Empire, Oliver Stone's Talk Radio, and The Care Bears Adventure in Wonderland.

A home video division was also started in 1986, previously known as Pan-Canadian Video Presentations in the early 80s. The company also had a home video deal with Universal with most titles released through their MCA Home Video banner in the US and Canada. The home video division lasted until 1998, when it was absorbed into Alliance Atlantis along with its film distribution counterpart. The company received a deal with Virgin Vision in 1987 for the Canadian distribution of the output.

Cineplex Odeon worked with Universal for distributing and co-producing some of their notable productions in the US, such as The Glass Menagerie, The Last Temptation of Christ, Oliver Stone's Talk Radio, and Madame Sousatzka. The company also had a home video deal with Universal with most titles released through their MCA Home Video (later Universal Studios Home Video) banner.

Cineplex Odeon also had an international division, Cineplex Odeon Films International, meant for distributing their films outside of North America.
