= List of Hong Kong films of 1973 =

A list of films produced in Hong Kong in 1973:

Title	Director	Cast	Genre	Notes
1973
The 3 Nymphs	Lau Tat, Wu Pang			
Adultery Chinese Style	Lui Kei			
Adventure In Denmark	Ho Fan			
Ambush	Ho Meng Hua			
The Angry Hero	Kim Lung			
Angry Tiger	Shang Ling			
The Awaken Punch	Fong Lung Seung			
Back Alley Princess	Lo Wei	Polly Shang-Kuan Ling-Feng, Samuel Hui Koon-Kit	Mandarin Action	
Back Street (aka The Bodyguards)	John Law	Jenny Hu Yan-Ni, Alan Tang Kwong-Wing	Romance, action, drama	
The Bamboo House Of Dolls	Kuei Chih Hung			
The Bastard (aka Little Hero, The Little Illegitimate, Nobody's Son)	Chor Yuen	Tsung Hua, Lily Li Li-Li, Chiao Lin	Mandarin Martial Arts Drama	
Beach Of The War Gods	Jimmy Wang Yu			
Beauty Heroine	Lau Sau Wa			
The Big Fellow	Mo Man Hung			
The Black Belt	Cheung Sam			
The Black Dragon	Joe Law Chi			
Black Friday	Man Sek Ling			
Black Guide	John Law			
Black Panther	Hau Chang			
Blazing Ninja	Godfrey Ho Chi Keung			
Blood Brothers	Chang Cheh			
Blood Witness	Kuei Chih Hung			
The Boxers	Hau Cheng	Chiang Pin, Shu Pei-Pei, Chin Han, Han Su, Chang Ping-Yu, Lui Ming, Tso Yen-Yung	Mandarin Martial Arts	
Breakout From Oppression	Lau Kar Leung, Gordon Liu			
The Brothers	Chan Tung Man			
Bruce Lee : The Man And The Legend	Wh Shih			
The Call Girls	Patrick Lung Kong	Betty Ting Pei, Tien Lie		
Call To Arms	Shen Chiang			
The Champion	Chu-Got Ching-Wan, Yang Ching-Chen	Chin Han, Shih Szu, Yi Yuan, Lung Fei, Han Su	Mandarin Martial Arts	
Cheat To Cheat	Li Han Hsiang		Mandarin Comedy	
Chinese Dragon	Wu Chia Chun			aka The Chinese Mechanic
Chinese Hercules	Huang Ta			
Chinese Kung Fu	Richard Yeung Kuen			
Chinese Kung Fu And Acupuncture	Suen Sing Yuen			
Chu Chow Kung Fu	Chan Hung Man			
The Deadly Chase (Hard Man in Danger)	Stanley Siu Wing	Charlie Chin Chiang-Lin, Nancy Liang Lan-Si, Leung Tin, Tina Chin Fei	Action	
Death Blow	Teddy Yip			
Death Comes In Three	Paul Chang Chung			
Death On The Docks	Cheung Sam			
The Delinquent	Chang Cheh			
Devil And Angel	Lo Lieh			
The Devil's Treasure	Jeong Chang-hwa			
La Dialectique peut-elle casser des briques?	Tu Guangqi, René Viénet			
Dragon And Tiger				
The Dragon And Tiger Joint Hands	Yeung Jing Chan			
Dumb Boxer	Liu Yang			
End Of The Black	Tu Chung Fan			
Enter the Dragon	Robert Clouse	Bruce Lee, John Saxon, Ahna Capri, Shih Kien, Robert Wall	Martial arts	
Escaped Convict	Lo Mar, Yu CHik Lim			
The Escaper	Lee Tso Nam			
Every Victorious Hall	Chang Ren Chieh			
Facets Of Love	Li Han-hsiang	Lily Ho Li-Li, Yueh Hua	Mandarin Adult	
The Fate Of Lee Khan	King Hu			
Ferocious To Ferocious	Wong Hung Cheung			
Fist of Shaolin	Lee Sun			
Fist of Unicorn	Tang Ti	Unicorn Chan, Paul Wei Ping-Ao, Bruce Lee, Ji Han Jae		
Fist to Fist	Jimmy L. Pascual			
Five Kung Fu Daredevil Heroes	Shen Chiang			
The Flaming Bulwark Of Miao	Chan Jing Boh			
The Flying Man Of Ma Lan	Ting Shan-hsi			
The Flying Tiger	Tang Sheng			
The Furious Killer	Tang Sheng			
A Gathering of Heroes	Griffin Yueh Feng			
The Generation Gap	Chang Cheh			
A Girl Called Tigress	Wong Hung Cheung			
Girl Named Iron Phoenix	Lin Fu Ti			
Gold Snatchers	Kim Lung			
Greatest Thai Boxing	Chui Chang Wang			
The Happiest Moment	Li Han Hsiang	Michael Hui, Tien Lie, Hu Chin, Ku Feng, Chan Shen, Shum Lo	Mandarin Comedy	
Haze In The Sunset	Chor Yuen	Ko Chun-Hsiung, Tang Pao-Yun	Mandarin Drama	
He Walks Like A Tiger	Kong Yee Hung			
A Heart With A Million Knots	Lee Hsing			
Hercules Against Karate	Antonio Margheriti			
The Hero Of Chiu Chow	Wong Sing Lui			
Heroes Of Sung	Shen Chiang			
Heroine Susan, The Sister Of The Shantung Boxer	Wong Hung Cheung			
Hill Fortress	Sun Chung			
Hong Kong Nite Life	Patrick Lung Kong			
Hong Kong Style	Steve Chan Ho			
Honor And Love	Dung Ming Saan			
The House of 72 Tenants	Chor Yuen	Yueh Hua, Tin Ching, Ching Li, Hu Chin, Lydia Shum, Chor Yuen, Hoh Sau-San, Lau Yat-Fan, Ku Feng, Ouyang Sha-fei, Adam Cheng, Ricky Hui, Chen Kuan Tai, Betty Ting, Law Lan, Danny Lee	Comedy	
How Is The Weather Today	Pai Ching Jui			
If Tomorrow Comes	Patrick Tse Yin			
Il Figlio di Zorro	Gianfranco Baldanello			
Il Giustiziere di Dio	Franco Lattanzi			
Illicit Desire	Li Han Hsiang	Yueh Hua, Fung Chin-Ping, Teresa Ha	Mandarin Adult	
Imperial Tomb Raiders	Ting Shan-hsi			
The Imprudent Iron Phoenix	Lin Fu Ti			
Infernal Street	Shen Chiang			
The Inheritor Of Kung Fu	Chan Hung Lit			
Invincible Boxer	Law Kei			
The Iron Bodyguard	Chang Cheh, Pao Hsueh Li			
The Iron Bull	Tang Ti			
The Jilted	Yang Su			
The Karate Killer	Yang Man Yi			aka Stranger from Canton
Killer In The Dark	Chan Tung Man			
The Kiss Of Death	Ho Meng Hua			
A Kiss to Remember	Yang Su			
Knight Errant	Ting Shan-hsi			
Kung Fu Brothers In The Wild West	Yang Man Yi			
Kung Fu Inferno	Chan Hung Man			
Kung Fu King	Joseph Kong Hung			
Kung Fu Mama	Kim Lung			
Kung Fu's Hero	Joseph Kong Hung			
Life For Sale	Law Kei			
Little Tiger of Canton	Chu Mu	Jackie Chan, Chan Hung Lit, Tien Feng	Kung fu	
The Lone Hero	Leung Chit Foo			
Love Across The Seas	Lo Chen			
Love Is a Four Letter Word	Cheung Sam			
A Man Called Tiger	Lo Wei	Jimmy Wang Yu, Kawai Okada, Kuro Mitsuo, Tien Feng, James Tin Chuen, Nakako Daisuke, Kasahara Reiko, Han Ying-Chieh, Minakaze Yuko, Maria Yi, Lee Kwan, Lo Wei, Hsiao Yin-Fang, Kam Shan, Chin Yuet-Sang, Lam Ching-Ying, Lee Tin-Ying || Martial Arts ||		
The Man On The Police Gazette	Lu Hao			
The Mandarin	Katy Chin Shu Mei			
The Master Of Kung Fu	Ho Meng Hua			
Mean Streets Of Kung Fu	Yang Tao			
The Money-Tree	Richard Yeung Kuen			
Morning Goodbye	Yu Feng Chi			
Murder Masters Of Kung Fu	Tyrone Hsu Tin Wing			
Na Cha And The Seven Devils	Tetsuya Yamanouchi			
None But The Brave	Lo Wei			aka Kung Fu Girl
Not Scared to Die	Zhu Mu	Jackie Chan, Yuen Qiu, Wong Ching		
Number One Iron Man	Lee Goon Cheung			
On The Verge Of Death	Li Fai Mon			
One by One	Kim Lung			
Operation White Shirt	Ting Shan-hsi			
The Opium Trail	Huang Feng			
Outside The Window	Sung Tsun Shou			
Payment In Blood	Kuei Chih Hung		Mandarin Martial Arts	
The Pirate	Chang Cheh, Pao Hsueh Lieh, Wu Ma			
Police Force	Chang Cheh, Tsai Yang Ming			
Police Woman	Zhu Mu	Jackie Chan, Yuen Qiu		
The Private Eye	Steve Chan Ho			
Qing Kung				
The Queen Bee	Ting Shan-hsi			
Rage Of The Wind	Ng See Yuen			
The Rats	Law Kei			
Rebirth Of A Deaf Mute	Fu Qi			
The Rendezvous Of Warriors	Jimmy Shaw			
Return Of The Assassin	Chen Tung Min			
River Of Fury	Chang Tseng Chai			
Rotary Kicks	Ku Hsi			
Seaman No. 7	Lo Wei			
Sei bounty killers per una strage	Franco Lattanzi			
Sette ore di violenza per una soluzione imprevista	Michele Massimo Tarantini			
Seven To One	Hau Chang			
Sexy Girls Of Denmark	Lui Kei			
Sexy Playgirls	Lui Kei			
Smoke In His Eye	Cheung Sam			
Smugglers	Suen Ga Man			
The Soul of Chiba	Chen Tung Min			
Stock Fever	Suen Ga Man, Wong Chung			
Stormy Sun	Wu Min Hsiung			
Studio legale per una rapina	Tanio Boccia			
The Sugar Daddies	Sun Chung			
Tales Of Larceny	Li Han Hsiang, Cheng Kang	Cheng Kang, Li Ching, Wang Lai, Betty Pei Ti, Margaret Hsing Hui, Karen Yip Leng-Chi, Ching Li	Adult Comedy	
The Tattooed Dragon	Lo Wei			
Thunderbolt	Joe Law Chi			
Tiger	John Law			
Tiger Boxer	Lam Gwok Leung			
To Subdue Evil	Yeung Jing Chan			
A Tooth For A Tooth	Joseph Kong Hung			
The Tormentor	Sung Ting Mei			
Triangular Duel	Joseph Kuo			
The Two Cavaliers	Griffin Yueh Feng			
The Two Tigers	Chan Lit Ban			
The Unscrupulous General	Tang Sheng			
Unsubdued Furies	Hau Chang			
The Villains	Chor Yuen	Yueh Hua, Shih Szu, Chen Hung-Lieh, Ching Miao, Chin Feng, Dean Shek Tin, Lee Pang-Fei, Betty Pei Ti	Mandarin Martial Arts	
Walking In The Rain	Yang Su			
The Way of the Tiger	Lee Goon Cheung			
We Visited Southeast Asia	Luk Bong			
When Taekwondo Strikes	Huang Feng			
Where Does Love Come From	Chang Tao			
Wild Tiger	Tsai Shi Chang			
Win Them All	Kao Pao-shu			
Woman Of The Night	Yau Goon Yan			
The Young Ones	Lee Hsing			
The Young Tiger	Wu Ma			
