= The Comet Strikes =

1971 Hong Kong film by Lo Wei

- Directed by: Lo Wei
- Written by: Lo Wei
- Produced by: Raymond Chow Man Wai
- Starring: Nora Miao; Patrick Tse Yin
- Cinematography: Kuo-Hsiang Lin
- Music by: Fu-Ling Wang
- Distributed by: Golden Harvest
- Release date: 1971
- Running time: 98 minutes
- Country: Hong Kong
- Language: Mandarin

The Comet Strikes (Chinese: 鬼流星; pinyin: Gui Liu Xing) is a 1971 Hong Kong action horror film directed by Lo Wei for Golden Harvest.

== Plot ==
Nora Miao and Chiang Nan in The Comet Strikes

During a time of strife in his court, a king and some loyal ministers hide in an old house rumored to be haunted, its previous tenants, Mr. and Mrs. Tse, having supposedly died there mysteriously. Their son, Tse Tin Jun, also travels to the house to find out the truth about his parents' death. When one of the ministers behind the revolt discovers the king's hiding place, he sends a military force to kill the king. It is revealed that Mr. and Mrs. Tse staged their deaths to deceive the public and they, along with their son, stand with the king and his party to fight against the rebels.

== Cast ==
- Nora Miao
- Patrick Tse Yin
- Lo Wei
- Stanley Fung
- Anthony Lau
- Lee Kwan
- Sek Kin
- Feng Yi
- Hung Lau
- Chiang Nan
- Sammo Hung
- Jason Pai
- Eddy Ko
