= Han Ying-chieh =

Chinese film actor (1927–1991)

- Chinese: 韓英傑
- Born: January 1, 1927; Shanghai, China
- Died: October 15, 1991 (aged 64); British Hong Kong
- Occupation: Actor

Chinese name
- Traditional Chinese: 韓英傑
- Simplified Chinese: 韩英杰
Transcriptions
Standard Mandarin
- Hanyu Pinyin: Han Yingjie
Yue: Cantonese
- Jyutping: Hon Ying-git

Han Ying-chieh (January 1, 1927 – October 15, 1991) was a Hong Kong Chinese actor. He started acting from 1966 and acted in movies such as Come Drink with Me and others. He acted in some films with Bruce Lee such as The Big Boss and Fist of Fury and with Jackie Chan in New Fist of Fury. Ying-chieh acted 60 movies from 1946 to 1991. His final performance was in The Swordsman (1990 film) as Huashan Sect elder Feng QingYang (風清揚).

== Personal life ==
In 1946, at the age of 19, he moved to Shanghai to work as a stuntman in the film industry. A few years later, he moved to Hong Kong and Singapore to pursue career opportunities, taking on side jobs such as martial arts actor and stuntman. In the 1960s, he returned to Hong Kong to join the Shaw Brothers Studio (which was privatized), performing many stunts, stunt exhibitions and producing films. At the same time, he was able to create more amazing performances and had a chance to meet director Hu Jinquan. In 1966, he left Shaw Brothers and moved to Taiwan to develop his career. Until 1970, when Han returned to Hong Kong, he worked as a martial arts instructor.

== Death ==
In 1990, Han was rushed to a hospital in Hong Kong where he was diagnosed with cancer. He later succumbed to the disease on October 15, 1991, after a one-year battle. He was 64 years old. Han was buried at a Hong Kong cemetery.

== Selected filmography ==
- 1950: Four Heroes of the Wang Family
- 1955: Fang Shi Yu yu Hu Hui Qian - Chamber guard
- 1961: Wen Ting Yu huo hai jian chou
- 1962: Ru yan jing hun - Choi Lung
- 1963: Liu Hai yu xian ji
- 1963: Hong Xian Nu ye dao bao he
- 1964: A Story of Three Loves (Part 1)
- 1964: A Story of Three Loves (Part 2)
- 1964: Between Tears and Smiles
- 1964: The Story of Sue San
- 1964: The Amorous Lotus Pan
- 1964: Lady General
- 1964: The Shepherd Girl
- 1965: The Mermaid - Prawn Spirit
- 1965: Sons of Good Earth
- 1965: The Lotus Lamp
- 1966: Das Schwert der gelben Tigerin - Bandit
- 1967: Angel with the Iron Fists
- 1967: The Iron Horse
- 1967: Tie ma yin ling
- 1967: Dragon Inn
- 1968: The Black Butterfly - 5th Chief Han Jie
- 1968: Jurang Bahaya
- 1968: Jue dou e hu ling
- 1968: The Angel Strikes Again
- 1968: Travels with a Sword
- 1968: Yu long yin
- 1968: Death Valley
- 1968: Killer Darts
- 1969: Tie gu chuan
- 1969: Luo Ma hu
- 1969: Dragon Swamp
- 1969: Killers Five
- 1969: Iron Bones
- 1970: The Eagle's Claw
- 1970: The Vietnamese Boxer
- 1971: The Invincible Eight
- 1971: The Big Boss - Hsiao Mi (The Boss)
- 1971: The Angry River
- 1971: A Touch of Zen - Hsu
- 1972: Fist of Fury - Feng Kwai-sher (starring Bruce Lee)
- 1972: Iron Bull
- 1973: A Man Called Tiger - Lin Mu Lang
- 1973: Back Alley Princess - Boss Han
- 1973: The Fighter - Flucht ins Chaos - Golden Hair's No. 3 man
- 1973: None but the Brave - Secret policeman
- 1973: The Fate of Lee Khan - Sha Yuan Shan
- 1973: Fist of Shaolin
- 1973: Unsubdued Furies
- 1974: Da zhui zong - The Boss
- 1974: Shao lin gao tu
- 1974: Tornado of Pearl River
- 1974: Fists for Revenge
- 1975: Chung Lieh Tu (The Valiant Ones) - Xu Dong
- 1975: The Golden Triangle
- 1975: Yi men zhong lie
- 1975: The Silent Guest from Peking
- 1975: Die Falle des gelben Drachen
- 1975: Heroes in Late Ming Dynasty
- 1976: The Himalayan
- 1976: Zwei Fäuste stärker als Bruce Lee
- 1976: Todeskommando Queensway
- 1976: Die Pranke des gelben Tigers
- 1976: Die Letzte Schlacht von Yang Chao - Chang
- 1976: One Armed Swordsmen
- 1977: Broken Oath
- 1977: The Martyrs
- 1977: Six Kung Fu Heroes
- 1978: The Prominent Eunuch Chen Ho
- 1978: Bruce Lee - Der reißende Puma - Han Tin Lung
- 1978: The Jade Hairpin Alliance
- 1979: Duell der 7 Tiger - Ting Ah-lung
- 1980: The Magnificent Kick - To Lo
- 1980: End of the Wicked Tigers
- 1984: Last Hero in Chin
- 1986: Xiong zhou - Li Ping
- 1987: Killer's Nocturne - Boss Cheung
- 1990: Meister des Schwertes

== See also ==
- Bruce Lee
