= The Big Boss =

1971 Hong Kong film by Lo Wei

- Hong Kong film poster
- Traditional Chinese: 唐山大兄
- Simplified Chinese: 唐山大兄
- Literal meaning: Tángshān Big Brother
- Hanyu Pinyin: Tángshān dàxiōng
- Jyutping: Tong4 Saan1 Daai6 Hing1
- Directed by: Lo Wei; Wu Chia-hsiang
- Written by: Lo Wei
- Produced by: Raymond Chow
- Starring: Bruce Lee; Maria Yi; James Tien; Han Ying-chieh
- Cinematography: Chen Ching-chu
- Edited by: Sung Ming
- Music by: Wang Fu-ling; Peter Thomas (alternative score)
- Production company: Golden Harvest
- Distributed by: Golden Harvest
- Release date: 23 October 1971 (Hong Kong)
- Running time: 100 minutes
- Country: Hong Kong
- Languages: Cantonese; Mandarin; Thai
- Budget: US$100,000
- Box office: US$50 million

The Big Boss (Chinese: 唐山大兄; trans. "The Big Brother from China"), originally released in the United States as Fists of Fury, is a 1971 Hong Kong martial arts film directed by Lo Wei (who also wrote the film) and Wu Chia-hsiang. Bruce Lee stars in his first major film in a lead role, and his first Hong Kong film since 1960. The film co-stars Maria Yi, James Tien, Tony Liu, and Nora Miao. Originally written for Tien, the leading role was given to Lee instead when the film's original director, Wu Chia-hsiang, was replaced by Lo Wei. The film was a critical success and excelled at the box office. Lee's strong performance overshadowed Tien, already a star in Hong Kong, and made Bruce Lee famous in Southeast Asia and eventually the world.

The film went on to gross nearly US$50 million worldwide (equivalent to approximately $400 million adjusted for inflation), against a tight budget of $100,000, 500 times its original budget. It was the highest-grossing Hong Kong film up until Lee's next film, Fist of Fury (1972).

== Plot ==
Cheng Chao-an, an unemployed rural Chinese mainlander, moves to Pak Chong, Thailand to live with his extended family and to work at an ice factory. He meets his cousin Hsu Chien when Hsu stands up to local street thugs who beat his kid brother. Cheng refrains from getting involved despite being tempted to, because he had sworn to his mother never to participate in any fighting, and wears a jade amulet as a reminder of his pledge.

Cheng begins his work at the factory. When an ice block is accidentally broken, a bag of white powder — obviously illegal drugs — falls out. Two of Cheng's cousins pick up the bag and are told to see the manager later that night, who tells them that the factory is a front for a drug smuggling ring led by Hsiao Mi (a.k.a. the Big Boss). When Cheng's cousins (Wang and Chang) refuse to join them, the manager sends his thugs to kill them and dispose of their bodies, thereby preserving the secret. Hsu Chien and Ah Pi, another of Cheng's cousins, go to Hsiao Mi's mansion to find out what happened to the Wang and Chang. Hsu doubts Hsiao's claims that he knows nothing and threatens to go to the authorities, leading Hsiao to set his gang on the duo. After a brutal battle, they are also killed. When the Chinese workers at the factory learn that Hsu and Ah Pi are missing, they refuse to work and start a riot against the Thai management, who are joined by a group of hired thugs.

Cheng still refuses to participate, but during the chaos, one of the thugs accidentally rips off and breaks Cheng's amulet. Enraged, Cheng jumps into the brawl and beats the thugs, causing them to flee. To reduce tensions, the factory manager makes Cheng a foreman, inviting him to a dinner that night to meet the boss. Everyone is happy that Cheng is the new foreman, except Chow Mei, because the others have forgotten about the missing men. Cheng promises to find out what he can about them.

At the dinner, the manager tells Cheng that the boss cannot make it due to a meeting with visitors from out of town. Several women arrive at the dinner table, sit next to Cheng, and ply him with cognac. Cheng gets drunk and spends the night with Sun Wu Man, a prostitute who attended the dinner. Cheng meets Chow Mei as he leaves the brothel in the morning, embarrassing him.

Because Cheng attended the dinner and got drunk, he did not follow up on his promise to speak to the police about the missing men. He tells his family when he returns home that he forgot. This causes much unease for Cheng's family and friends, who believe that Cheng is reveling in his new position instead of helping to look for their brothers. They resent him, except Chow Mei, who stands up for him.

Later, Sun Wu Man warns Cheng that his life is in danger and reveals that Hsiao Mi is running a drug trafficking operation. Immediately after Cheng leaves, Hsiao's son, Hsiao Chiun, sneaks in and murders Sun. Cheng breaks into the factory and first finds the drugs before discovering a hand, the head of Sun, and the head of Hsu Chien in the ice blocks. Cheng is surrounded by Hsiao Chiun and a group of his men. Cheng fights his way out, killing Hsiao Chiun and his gang in the process. He returns home to find that his remaining family members have been murdered, while Chow Mei is missing. Mourning his loss by a river, Cheng vows to exact revenge, even if he dies.

Cheng subsequently storms Hsiao Mi's mansion to fight him and his men. One of Hsiao Mi's disgruntled slaves frees Chow Mei, who was being held hostage in a cramped room used as a prison cell. She runs away to get help from the Thai police. Cheng finally kills Hsiao Mi after a fierce fight by deflecting the knife Mi throws at him with his shoe. Once he learns that Chow Mei is safe (as she came running along with the police division), he surrenders to the police when they arrive at the mansion.

== Cast ==
- Bruce Lee as Cheng Chao-an (Chinese: 鄭潮安; Cantonese Yale: Zeng Ciu-On) (dubbed by Zhang Peishan), a young man who, along with his uncle, travels from Guangdong, China to Pak Chong, Thailand to stay with his cousins. Before departing, he swore an oath to his mother to not get into any fights. This is made legitimate by Cheng wearing his mother's jade amulet necklace to serve as a reminder to that oath he swore.
- Maria Yi as Chow Mei (Chinese: 周美; pinyin: Zhōu Měi), a typical damsel in distress; Cheng's only female cousin
- James Tien (a.k.a. Paul Tien) as Hsu Chien (Chinese: 許謙; pinyin: Xǔ Qiān), a martial artist who commonly fights with the local gangs
- Nora Miao as a local cold drinks vendor (guest star)
- Li Kun as Ah Kun (Chinese: 阿坤; pinyin: Ā Kūn)
- Han Ying-chieh as Hsiao Mi (Chinese: 小蜜; pinyin: Xiǎo Mì; "The Big Boss"), owner of the Wanli Ice Factory, in actuality a front for his drug-trafficking operation
- Lau Wing as Hsiao Chiun (Chinese: 小俊; pinyin: Xiǎo Jùn), Hsiao Mi's son
- Kam Shan as Ah San
- Ricky Chik as Ah Chang (also assistant director)
- Li Hua Sze as Ah Wang
- Billy Chan Wui-ngai as Ah Pi
- Lam Ching-ying as Ah Yin
- Marilyn Bautista (a.k.a. Malarin Boonak) as Miss Sun Wu Man, a prostitute
- Chan Chue as the factory manager (also assistant director)
- Chom as Ah Sheng, the factory foreman
- Tu Chia-Cheng as Uncle Liu, Cheng's uncle (also unit manager)
- Ma Man-Chun as Old Ma (also props)
- Peter Chan Lung as Hsiao Mi's henchman and gatekeeper

== Background and conception ==
The four years following the cancellation of The Green Hornet were difficult and frustrating for Bruce Lee. In 1970, he was incapacitated for several months after damaging a sacral nerve in his lower back while weightlifting. Money became tight as the star struggled to find other roles, and his wife Linda had to work evenings at an answering service to make ends meet. Bruce tried his hand at writing and producing, but Warner Bros. was reluctant to accept a TV script project he had developed, Kung Fu), and production on The Silent Flute had to be suspended indefinitely after a three-week trip to India with James Coburn and Stirling Silliphant to scout locations for the movie proved unproductive. Bruce finally took Coburn's advice to explore the possibility of restarting his career in the growing Hong Kong film industry.

In spring 1970, Bruce made his first visit to Hong Kong in several years accompanied by his young son Brandon. Unbeknownst to Bruce, he had become famous there due to reruns of The Green Hornet on TV, and the enthusiastic reception he received took him by surprise. He was invited to appear on popular HKTVB chat show Enjoy Yourself Tonight, where he was interviewed and gave a board-breaking demonstration.

Encouraged by the interest in Hong Kong, Bruce asked his childhood friend Unicorn Chan to pass on his CV to Shaw Brothers, Hong Kong's largest film production company. They offered Bruce a long-term contract but only US$2,000 per film, which Bruce declined. Another offer appeared unexpectedly from Raymond Chow, a film producer who had in 1970 left Shaw Brothers to form a new company, Golden Harvest. Chow, aware of the rejected offer from Shaw Brothers, had been impressed by Bruce's interviews on Hong Kong television and radio, and also by his confidence during a long-distance phone call. During that phone call, Lee determined the best action movie playing in Hong Kong and assured Chow that he could do much better.

In June 1971, Chow sent one of his producers, Liu Liang-Hua (the wife of director Lo Wei) to Los Angeles to meet and negotiate with Bruce, who signed a contract to make two films for Golden Harvest for US$15,000 ($10,000 for The Big Boss and $5,000 on completion of a second film tentatively titled King of Chinese Boxers and which became Fist of Fury). This eased the Lees' financial worries and permitted Linda to quit her job.

Shortly after the contract was signed, rival film companies tried to poach him away from Golden Harvest, including Shaw Brothers, with a new and improved offer. A film producer from Taiwan told Bruce to rip up the contract and promised to take care of any lawsuit. Bruce, a man of his word, had no intention of considering the offers, although it did give Chow cause for concern.

With the contract signed, Chow hastily arranged a meeting with his Golden Harvest executives and an old friend called Ma Thien-Ek (Fatty Ma), a Thai businessman, film distributor and cinema owner. They knew that Shaw Brothers were making a Muay Thai boxing film in Thailand (Duel of Fists), and wanted to make their new film there, which would also help to keep costs down. Fatty Ma, an expert in Thai affairs, offered to help with locations and expenses.

== Production ==
=== Writing ===
Veteran Chinese novelist and screenwriter Ni Kuang was commissioned to create a script based loosely on Cheng Chi-Yong, a prominent Chinese figure in Thai society in the early 20th century. Ni Kuang changed the name of the character to Cheng Chao-an, after Chao'an county in eastern China, the home of Cheng Chi-Yong's ancestors. He also developed the idea of Cheng being sent by his mother to live and work with fellow Chinese migrants in Thailand, after his father had been killed in a fight. She gave her son a jade necklace symbolising peace, protection and good fortune, as a reminder to avoid trouble.

It was not unusual in Hong Kong cinema for the director to amend the script during filming, and The Big Boss was no exception. When Lo Wei replaced the original director in late July 1971, he was unhappy with the script and re-wrote it, without Bruce's knowledge. Lo later recalled, "I wouldn't tell him I was re-writing the script for fear of affecting his morale. In my hotel room, he would often discuss the script with me which would leave me tongue-tied, so I would tell him I needed to rest, and as soon as he left I would be burning the midnight oil in order to get the script ready for the next day's filming."

=== Filming ===
Bruce Lee flew from Los Angeles to Bangkok via Hong Kong on 12 July 1971. Raymond Chow, concerned about renewed interest from Shaw Brothers, had wanted him to fly directly to Bangkok, but Bruce refused, stopping in Hong Kong briefly to greet a friend and make a few phone calls. Bruce stayed in Bangkok for five nights, and it was here that he met most of the cast and crew and also Chow for the first time. Filming commenced on 22 July in Pak Chong, a small town situated some 90 miles (140 km) northeast of Bangkok, on the northern edge of the Khao Yai National Park, Thailand's oldest reserve; it also serves as the gateway to the northeast (Isan) of Thailand from the Bangkok Metropolitan Region. Pak Chong would be Bruce's home for about four weeks, and he made no secret of his dislike for it in letters to wife Linda, describing it as a lawless, impoverished and undeveloped village. Due to the lack of fresh food and meat, Bruce was losing weight, having to eat canned meat and supplement his diet with vitamins, which he had thankfully brought along. He occasionally lost his voice through trying to shout above the noise on set; mosquitoes and cockroaches were everywhere, and the tap water in the hotel was yellow. Bruce asked the hotel staff to put his mattress on the floor, as sleeping on the bed was uncomfortable due to his ongoing back problem. He also needed lots of rest after a fight scene.

While Bruce was in Pak Chong, he received a telegram from Paramount TV executive Tom Tannenbaum, asking him to appear in three additional episodes of Longstreet (Note: Before flying to Thailand, Bruce had filmed an appearance for the first episode of Longstreet, which was written by student Stirling Silliphant and showcased his philosophy and Jeet Kune Do.), offering him $1000 per episode. Bruce, who felt he was worth more, countered with $2000 per episode plus "quality technical advising", which Paramount eventually agreed to.

Shooting did not go smoothly at first. After just a few days, the "uncertain" original director, Wu Chia-hsiang, was replaced by Lo Wei (the husband of associate producer Liu Liang-Hua). Bruce was initially sceptical of Lo, describing him in letters to Linda as a "fame lover" and "another so-so one with an almost unbearable air of superiority". Bruce badly cut his right hand while washing a thin glass, the wound requiring ten stitches and a large plaster, which is very noticeable throughout the movie, especially the scenes filmed at the Thamrongthai ice factory, the first filming location used in Pak Chong. Fatty Ma had a contact who knew the owner of the factory, and arranged for Golden Harvest to film there for a few days.

One night, filming of the big fight in the ice house had to be stopped for an hour as Bruce had lost a contact lens, and dozens of people were on their hands and knees looking for it amongst thousands of ice chips. Eventually Bruce found it himself, leading Lo Wei to wonder if he had it in his pocket all along, and was deliberately being disruptive.

Aside from the factory, other locations in Pak Chong used for filming include the Lam Ta Khong river (a tributary of the Mun River), and a local brothel (the Mitsumphun Hotel). The actual bedroom scenes however were filmed in a riverside bungalow owned by the nearby New Wanchai Hotel (now the Rimtarninn), where the film crew stayed during filming, due to the bedrooms in the brothel being smelly and unhygienic. The prostitutes charged only fifteen Baht in Thai money per client, but the film crew paid them one to two hundred Baht each to appear as extras in the film.

Perhaps the most iconic location seen in the film is the titular big boss's mansion and gardens, which was a Buddhist temple situated on the main road called Wat Siri Samphan, built in 1963. Like the ice factory, it is still in Pak Chong today and remains largely unchanged, much to the delight of the dedicated fans who have made the pilgrimage to Thailand to view the filming locations.

There has been some speculation that Bruce was involved in a real fight on the set of The Big Boss, as depicted in the 1993 biopic Dragon: The Bruce Lee Story. Although no such fight actually took place, Bruce did interact extensively with a few of the Thai stuntmen (one of whom was a former Muay Thai bantamweight champion), and exchanged info and skills with them between takes. Bruce reportedly though seemed unimpressed and called their kicks "telegraphed", while the Hong Kong stunt team (Lam Ching-Ying, Billy Chan and his brother Peter Chan Lung) were initially unimpressed with Bruce, and doubted his abilities. Their opinion of him soon changed when Lam challenged Bruce in the hotel, and Bruce sidekicked him across the room.

After an eventful, and at times chaotic, first few days' filming in Pak Chong, by early August the filming had picked up speed and was progressing well. Bruce and Lo Wei were collaborating, but they still clashed over a few of the scenes, in particular the use of trampolines and mattresses to propel people through the air, and also the scene where Bruce punches a man through a wooden wall, leaving a cartoonish outline in the wood. Bruce was also hesitant to go along with Lo Wei's ideas of filming risqué scenes of his character getting in bed with Thai ladies portraying prostitutes, although he eventually agreed to do them as Lo insisted it would add to his character's newfound image as a revenge-driven warrior.

The final scene filmed in Pak Chong was the climactic fight between Bruce and the boss (played by Han Ying Chieh, who also served as the fight choreographer), which proved to be problematic: Bruce endured "two days of hell" when he sprained his ankle from a high jump on a slipped mattress, and had to be driven to Bangkok to see a doctor, where he caught a virus in the hot and stuffy conditions. Close-ups were used to finish the fight, as Bruce struggled and had to drag his leg, which was covered up with, and contributed to, his character's worn out, exhausted appearance.

The cast and crew spent the last twelve days in August filming further scenes in Bangkok, where Bruce enjoyed breakfast in bed at the Thai Hotel, a luxury he never had in Pak Chong. The dinner party scene was filmed in an upstairs room of the Poonsin Chinese Restaurant, close to the Thai Hotel. A few scenes were filmed at the Chao Phraya River in Phra Pradaeng District, including the opening scene in the film where Bruce and his uncle step off the ferry boat and walk through the busy pier. An old teak house in the east side of Phra Pradaeng district was used as the family home, while Nora Miao's scenes (and part of the opening fight sequence) were filmed on the quieter west side, which resembled rural Pak Chong. At times filming was delayed by heavy rain.

The Big Boss film crew returned to Hong Kong on 3 September, where there would be a further day of filming for insert shots including close-ups of Bruce avoiding the dogs and the "leg-grappling" scene during the fight with the boss (these were filmed at the Royal Hong Kong Golf Club). The final scene filmed was the now deleted "pushcart attack" in the alleyway, at Wader Studio in Hong Kong, as Golden Harvest had not as yet moved into their famous studios on Hammer Hill Road.

=== Post-production ===
Bruce viewed over three hours of unedited footage on 5 September, and was pleased with the results. The next day, he flew to the US to see his family and film further episodes of Longstreet. While Bruce was away, the footage was sent for processing and editing. The editing was initially done by Golden Harvest editor Sung Ming, but because they were behind schedule, the renowned award-winning editor Chiang Hsing-Lung was also brought in to help. A veteran of over 170 movies, Chiang worked quickly, and helped deliver the film on time. Since he was employed by Shaw Bros at the time, his involvement was kept secret, and he was uncredited.

Bruce returned to Hong Kong on 16 October with his family plus friend Robert Baker. They were greeted at Kai Tak Airport by friends, news reporters and a large group of scouts from the Scout Association of Hong Kong. The next day, a private screening was held at Golden Harvest for cinema owners and the press. Sung Ming then made further edits to appease the Hong Kong censors, for the film's general release at the end of October. On 22 October, Bruce and Robert Baker appeared on Enjoy Yourself Tonight to promote the film.

=== Bruce Lee and JKD short film ===
While in Thailand, Bruce wrote to Linda regularly, telling her he missed her and the children, and was looking forward to seeing them in Hong Kong once filming had been completed. In return for their air fare (from their home in Los Angeles to Hong Kong), Golden Harvest wanted Bruce to make a short film for them called Bruce Lee and Jeet Kune Do, which would run for approximately 15 minutes and be narrated by actress Nora Miao. According to Hong Kong press reports, Golden Harvest had originally planned for the short film to accompany the release of another upcoming film of theirs called The Hurricane (a.k.a. Gold Cyclone Whirlwind), starring Nora and written and directed by Lo Wei. This would promote Nora and introduce Lee's skills to the Hong Kong public prior to the release of The Big Boss. Nora, who was already in Thailand on vacation, joined the film crew in Bangkok in late August 1971, but the short film was not made, presumably because there was not enough time; she did, however, film a few brief scenes for The Big Boss in a cameo role as a roadside refreshment vendor.

== Release ==
=== Box office ===
On 23 October 1971, the film premiered at the Queen's Theatre in Hong Kong's Central District for a now legendary midnight screening. Linda recalled: "Every dream that Bruce had ever possessed came true that night. The audience rose to its feet, yelling, clapping, cheering. It was almost impossible to leave the theatre; we were absolutely mobbed." The Lees also attended the official gala premiere on 3 November, which was a charity screening for the Scout Association of Hong Kong. The film was an instant success, taking just 3 days to reach HK$1 million, and a week to reach HK$2 million. By the end of its relatively brief run (ending on 18 November), The Big Boss had made HK$3.2 million, breaking the previous record held by The Sound of Music by more than HK$800,000. An estimated 1.2 million people in Hong Kong, out of a population of four million, had paid to watch the film. It became the highest-grossing film of all time in Hong Kong until Lee's second film, Fist of Fury, was released in March 1972.

Shortly after the Hong Kong run, The Big Boss was released in Singapore, and enjoyed similar success there, where it played for a total of 45 days at five theatres. There was chaos at a midnight preview screening (27 November 1971) at Cathay's Jurong Drive-in cinema; police were called as hundreds of cars caused huge jams, and the film had to be delayed for 45 minutes. It went on general release on 8 December, and by the end of its run on 21 January 1972, it had broken box office records with just over S$700,000, about S$240,000 more than previous record-holder The Ten Commandments. The film also played to packed cinemas in Malaysia, the third territory to show the film. By September 1972, it had grossed US$370,000 (equivalent to $2,900,000 in 2025) in the Malaysian capital city of Kuala Lumpur. During its initial run, the film grossed more than US$5 million in Southeast Asia alone and US$12,000,000 (equivalent to $95,000,000 in 2025) across Asia.

Despite the success of The Big Boss, overseas distributors were initially reluctant as they did not think it had potential outside Southeast Asia. It was only when the film suddenly became a surprise hit in Beirut (Lebanon) in 1972 that they began to take notice. Suddenly buyers from all over the world were arriving in Hong Kong to buy the film, which was soon opening in new markets for Chinese films such as South America, Africa and southern Europe. The film became a major box office hit in Europe between 1972 and early 1973. In the UK, however, the release of the English-dubbed version was delayed as distributors Crest Films withdrew their application for a BBFC certificate, while they waited for the current storm surrounding film censorship in Britain to pass (the Mandarin version was shown in Chinese cinema clubs in Britain in June 1972).

There was also a delay in the US, as distributors National General Pictures disliked the dubbing, and spent a lot of money on a new soundtrack featuring new music and rewritten, redubbed English dialogue. This new version was eventually released in the US in April 1973 with the title Fists of Fury, about 18 months after the Hong Kong premiere and after Fist of Fury (retitled The Chinese Connection in the US), Lee's second major role, had a limited run in New York. It was an instant hit, with opening day earnings of US$50,000 (equivalent to $360,000 in 2025) from 53 theaters in the New Jersey and New York areas. It topped the North American box office in May 1973, above two other Hong Kong martial arts films in the second and third spots, Lady Whirlwind (Deep Thrust) and King Boxer (Five Fingers of Death). Its success was surprising given that the film was only originally intended for the Mandarin circuit. The film earned $2,800,000 (equivalent to $20,000,000 in 2025) in distributor rentals at the American and Canadian box office during its initial run in 1973. The Big Boss went on to gross a total revenue of $16.2 million in the United States (equivalent to $88.3 million adjusted for inflation in 2020), where it sold approximately 9.418 million tickets and was one of the top 20 films released in 1973.

In France, the film became one of the top ten highest-grossing films of 1973, with 2,519,063 ticket sales. In Spain, the film sold 2,211,383 tickets. Upon its October 1973 release in South Korea, the film sold 209,551 tickets in the capital city of Seoul. In Lebanon, the film had a packed six-week first run in Beirut and then a second run that outperformed The Godfather (1972). The UK and Japan were among the last countries to release the film, in April 1974. In Japan, it was the year's seventh-highest-grossing film, with ¥600,000,000 (equivalent to ¥1,400,000,000 in 2024) in distributor rental earnings.

Against a tight budget of US$100,000, the film grossed nearly US$50 million worldwide (equivalent to approximately $400 million adjusted for inflation), earning nearly 500 times its budget.

=== Re-releases ===
When the film was released in the United States, the death of Hsiao Mi, "The Boss", was cut down to him simply being stabbed in the chest with a knife in order to receive an "R" rating. The original version of his death, which not only shows an explicit close-up of the knife in his chest but Cheng Chao-an's fingers piercing his rib cage and blood flowing from under his shirt, would have given the film an "X" rating. The first time this scene was shown in the U.S. was when it played on cable channel AMC in July 2004.

Columbia Pictures released the film as a re-issue in 1978 and again re-issued it with Fist of Fury as a studio sanctioned double feature in February 1981. Miramax distributed The Big Boss on television & streaming (Hulu & Netflix) along with Bruce Lee, the Legend (1984), Game of Death, Way of the Dragon and Fist of Fury.

In the United Kingdom, the film was watched by 300,000 viewers on Channel 5 in 2008, making it the year's most-watched foreign-language film on Channel 5.

On July 14, 2020, The Criterion Collection released a Blu-ray box set featuring The Big Boss, Fist of Fury, The Way of the Dragon, Enter the Dragon, Game of Death, and Game of Death II titled Bruce Lee: His Greatest Hits.

=== Critical reception ===
The Big Boss received mixed reviews from critics upon release. The South China Morning Post during the film's original Hong Kong run said that "This is probably the biggest thing to hit the Mandarin film business since the invention of fake blood ... Every cinema showing this film is packed to the fire exits." In a positive review for Singapore newspaper The Straits Times, Arthur Richards wrote, "It is a delightful study of Chinese martial arts mixed with karate and lightning kicks, Western-style ... An acceptable thriller of the James Bond calibre." Conversely, a negative review by Edgar Koh had appeared in another Singapore newspaper, New Nation, a few days earlier: "Bruce Lee is certainly skilled in his job, not as an actor but as an exponent of his particular brand of fighting with fists and legs ... There are the stereotype good and bad, and the by now redundant theme of revenge. On top of this, it doesn't flow smoothly; the emotional mood, shallow though it is, is sometimes left out on a limb."

Reviews were also mixed when the film was released (as Fists of Fury) in the U.S. in spring 1973. J. Oliver Prescott of the Tampa Bay Times wrote, "Bruce Lee is the fastest foot in the East ... Now back in Hong Kong, he has become the hottest international movie star since Clint Eastwood. Unlike Eastwood's anti-hero, Bruce Lee is giving the American audiences what they apparently want now: a hero. Lee is Rex Allen, Lash Larue, Tom Mix, Roy Rogers and Gene Autry all rolled into one ... The characters are certainly simple: these are just plain Chinese country folk whose little disagreements develop overnight into Oriental rumbles equivalent to the Sharks and Jets in West Side Story." Vincent Canby of The New York Times wrote, "Kung fu movies began as a local phenomenon in Hong Kong a couple of years ago. The two I've just seen, Fists of Fury (a.k.a. The Big Boss) and Deep Thrust (a.k.a. Lady Whirlwind), make the worst Italian Westerns look like the most solemn and noble achievements of the early Soviet cinema." Variety stated, "Despite the silly plot, dreadful supporting cast and prim morality (or perhaps because of them), Fists of Fury is sometimes entertaining, with most of the credit due to Lee."

On review aggregator Rotten Tomatoes, the film holds a score of 65% based on 17 reviews, with an average rating of 6.1/10.

== Alternative versions ==
=== Censorship and missing scenes ===
The Big Boss has a long and complicated history of censorship and editing, with many scenes being trimmed or removed completely for various reasons and for different markets. A few shots of excessive violence and bloodshed (including the notorious "saw in the head" kill) and a sex scene were cut by the Hong Kong censors before the film was released, and haven't been seen since.

Numerous further scenes were cut for all prints released outside of Hong Kong, mainly to increase the pacing of the film, as follows:

- The scene at the refreshments stall is shortened, including an extended fight between Hsu Chien (James Tien) and the thugs.
- An entire scene in which some of the cousins play a game of Chinese chess, only for Ah Kun (Li Kun) to complain about cheating; also some of Cheng Chao An's (Bruce Lee) arrival at the house.
- Cheng and Hsu are walking home after the fight near the gambling den; they enter a narrow alleyway and have to grab hands and leap onto a wall to avoid two carts which are hurled towards them. The pair return home, with Cheng looking amused as Hsu describes the fight to the family.
- A scene in which Cheng, after seeing his uncle off, heads down a road and observes the drink stand seller smiling at him from her stall; he walks past her looking glum.
- As the thugs dispose of the two cousins at the ice house, a severed head is thrown into an ice container.
- Some shots of Hsiao Chiun (Tony Liu) and then his father demonstrating fighting tactics to their men.
- Some shots of Hsu and Hsiao Chiun after the former is stabbed in the head.
- Some shots of the thugs approaching and entering the grounds of the family home.
- The shot of Cheng lifting the net to reveal Ah San's body is shortened.
- The scene of Cheng at the riverside is shortened to remove some of his inner monologue and shots of his cousins' murdered bodies. After standing up and throwing his bundle of belongings into the river, the parts of him angrily shaking his fist and repeatedly shouting "Revenge!" are removed.
- After Cheng runs down the road from the creek, rather than cutting to him arriving at the big boss's mansion as in the usual versions, he returns to the brothel for a third time. Here, he picks the prostitute in a red sweater-type dress (seen in the background the second time Cheng visits the brothel). They go to her room; Cheng pushes her onto the bed, and the two begin to strip. Cheng stands behind the bed, completely nude, but also completely emotionless. The woman lies on the bed and Cheng walks (waist-high shot) towards the camera, blurring out the scene. Next, Cheng is shown tucking in his shirt, while the woman remains in bed, staring at him. He hands all his money to her, even though he already paid. He then picks up a bag of prawn crackers from the bedside table, tries one, and then leaves.
- Cheng punches Hsiao Mi one more time as he lies lifeless.

In December 1979, a Bruce Lee film festival in Kilburn, London, was organised by Kung-Fu Monthly poster magazine; a Mandarin print from Golden Harvest's London office was screened for over 1,700 fans and was complete with the exception of a few shots cut by the Hong Kong censors. In 2023, Arrow Films announced the release of a set titled Bruce Lee at Golden Harvest, whose contents include an early Mandarin version of The Big Boss, which restores the scenes listed above.

A few scenes remain missing, and are presumably lost. These include more footage at the family home, a drunken Cheng approaching the girl at the dinner party and imagining her topless, more of Cheng discovering the body parts in the ice, and a shot of Cheng tasting his own blood during the fight with the boss.

=== Alternative title confusion ===
When The Big Boss was being prepared for American distribution, the U.S. release was to be re-titled The Chinese Connection, a play on the popular The French Connection, since both dealt with drug trafficking. The U.S. title of Lee's second film, Fist of Fury, was to be kept nearly the same, except using the plural Fists. However, the titles were accidentally reversed. The Big Boss was released as Fists of Fury and Fist of Fury became The Chinese Connection. Recent American TV showings and the official U.S. DVD release from 20th Century Fox in 2005 have restored the original titles of all Bruce Lee films, though the descriptions do not match in some cases.

=== Alternative music scores ===
Unlike other Lee films, The Big Boss is unique in having three completely different music scores. Fist of Fury, Way of the Dragon and Enter the Dragon all only feature one score with minor alterations.

The first music score for it was composed by Wang Fu-ling, who worked on films such as The Chinese Boxer and One-Armed Swordsman. This was made for the original Mandarin language version and was also used for the first English version, in addition to the theatrical French and Turkish versions. Wang was the only one to receive credit, but it is also believed composer Chen Yung-Yu assisted with the score. At least one cue from Japanese composer Akira Ifukube's scores for the Daimajin trilogy of films was also utilised as stock music.

The second and most widespread of the music scores was by German composer Peter Thomas. This did not become widely known until 2005, when most of the music he composed for the film was published on iTunes. Thomas's involvement stems from a complete reworking of the English version of the film. The early version featured expatriate voice actors living in Hong Kong who worked on the Shaw Brothers' films, and used Wang Fu-ling's score. American distributor National General Pictures disliked the dubbing and music, and, in early 1973 commissioned the Miami-based dubbing company Copri Films International to create a second English dub. Peter Thomas re-scored the film, abandoning Wang Fu-ling's original music. The German dubbed version (German: Die Todesfaust des Cheng Li, English: The Deadly Fist of Cheng Li), premiering before the reworked English version, features his score.

The third score is the 1982 Cantonese release score, which primarily features music from Golden Harvest composer Joseph Koo. However, a good portion of Koo's music in the Cantonese version was originally created in 1974 for the Japanese theatrical release of The Big Boss, which was half Koo's music and half Peter Thomas's. Golden Harvest simply took Koo's music from the Japanese version and added it to the Cantonese version. Aside from this, this version is most infamous for its use of the Pink Floyd music cues from "The Grand Vizier's Garden Party, Part 2", "Time" and "Obscured by Clouds", as well as King Crimson's "Larks' Tongues in Aspic, Part Two". Other music cues were taken from old horror films and B-movies, including I Was a Teenage Werewolf and How To Make A Monster.

== Legacy ==
Kotaku and The Guardian traced the video game usage of the term "boss" back to The Big Boss.

=== Unofficial sequels ===
In 1976, a non-canon continuation to The Big Boss was made called The Big Boss Part II, starring Bruce Le (Huang Kin Lung) as Cheng Chao-an and Lo Lieh as Cheng's brother, who wants revenge for their father's murder. The film was directed by Chan Chue, who was an assistant director on the original film and also reprises his role as the villainous ice factory manager Wu Bin. The Big Boss Part II was partly filmed at some of the Pak Chong locations used in the original film, including the ice factory and the Buddhist temple which is used as the villain's lair. The elusive film still exists, but did not make it to home video until Severin Films released a new scan of a Mandarin print as a bonus on the Enter the Clones boxset in 2024.

A later sequel, Big Boss Untouchable, was produced in 2002 with Dragon Sek in the lead role.

=== Loose sequel ===
In 1981, another film simply called Big Boss II (杰泉达东考, Jiě quán dà dōng kǎo) was released. Directed by Lu-Po Tu and starring Ryong Keo (Dragon Lee), Tan Yin (Bolo Yeung), Lik Cheung, Yoo-haeng Kim, Ying-Hung Lau, Fa-Yuan Li, Ni Liu, Yao-Kun Pan, Chien-Po Tsen, and Wei-Ho Tu. While transporting funds for independence movement, Lee Han-saeng is shot in the legs by the Japanese military police. He recovers from his wounds with the help of Jang Geo-chil, an independence fighter, and his daughter, Wan-ah. When the Japanese police investigate Jang's house, Han-saeng and Jang take refuge in the home of Wan-ah's uncle. But he sells them out, blinded by his greed for the reward on their heads. They run and hide in kisaeng Ae-hi's home. Ae-hi and her sister Yu-ha desire revenge on the Japanese police who killed their father. But they are killed when Wan-ah's uncle turns them to the Japanese police while Han-saeng is away. When Jang and his wife are killed, Han-saeng takes revenge on the Japanese police. In the US, the film also goes by the titles Chinese Goliath, Muscle of the Dragon, and The Deadly Dragon Lee Fights Again.

=== Other actors as Bruce Lee playing Cheng Chao-an ===
Various Bruce Lee biopics have been filmed over the years, with the two most famous being Bruce Lee: The Man, The Myth and Dragon: The Bruce Lee Story. Both of these films feature their respective actors, Bruce Li and Jason Scott Lee, at one point acting as Lee on the set of The Big Boss. Both films feature a variation of the rumour that Lee was challenged on the set by a Thai boxer. In Myth, Lee was challenged on set and was caught in the middle of an ambush later on off the set. In Dragon, Lee is challenged during an actual take during filming of The Big Boss, wearing the trademark rolled up long sleeve white T-shirt, white sash, and black pants. Both of these are highly exaggerated accounts (not to mention that Dragon makes the mistake of saying that filming for The Big Boss began in July 1970 rather than in July 1971), as the story told is that Lee merely discusses martial arts with a Thai fighter on the set. Besides these two examples, a third Bruce Lee biopic, The Legend of Bruce Lee, this time with Danny Chan Kwok-kwan as Lee and filmed in mini-series form, was shown in Hong Kong in 2008 as part of China's hosting of the summer Olympics. Once again, this biopic shows Lee encountering a Thai boxer on the set of The Big Boss, this time with the challenger being played by martial arts film veteran Mark Dacascos. Photos and behind-the-scenes video of this scene have appeared on various websites, including Dacascos's official site.

== Home media ==
=== VHS releases ===
4 Front (United Kingdom)

- Released: 17 March 1997
- Classification: 18

4 Front (United Kingdom)

- Released: 1 October 2001
- Part of a boxset
- Classification: 18

20th Century Fox (America)

- Released: 21 May 2002
- Named Fists of Fury
- Classification: R, X (known in some video releases)
- Color: NTSC
- Run time: 99 minutes

=== DVD releases ===
Universe (Hong Kong)

- Aspect ratio: Widescreen (2:35:1) letterboxed
- Sound: Cantonese (Dolby Digital 5.1), Mandarin (Dolby Digital 5.1)
- Subtitles: Traditional, Simplified Chinese, English, Japanese, Korean, Indonesian, Malaysian, Thai, Vietnamese
- Supplements: Trailer, trailers for Way of the Dragon, Enter the Dragon, Game of Death, Legacy of Rage, star files
- All regions, NTSC

Mega Star (Hong Kong)

- Aspect ratio: Widescreen (2:29:1)
- Sound: Cantonese (Dolby Digital 2.0 Dual Mono), Mandarin (Dolby Digital 2.0 Dual Mono)
- Subtitles: Traditional, Simplified Chinese, English, Japanese, Korean
- Supplements: Trailer, synopsis, cast and Crew biographies
- All regions, NTSC

Fortune Star – Bruce Lee Ultimate DVD Collection (Hong Kong)

- Released: 29 April 2004
- Aspect ratio: Widescreen (2:35:1) anamorphic
- Sound: Cantonese (DTS 5.1), Cantonese (Dolby Digital 5.1), Cantonese (Dolby Digital 2.0 Mono), Mandarin (DTS 5.1), Mandarin (Dolby Digital 5.1)
- Subtitles: Traditional, Simplified Chinese, English
- Supplements: Original trailer, new trailer, still photos, slideshow of photos, celebrity interviews, unseen footage, Game of Death outtakes, Enter the Dragon alternate opening, 32-page booklet
- Region 3, NTSC

Fox (America)

- Released: 21 May 2002
- Aspect ratio: Widescreen (2:27:1) letterboxed
- Sound: English (Dolby Digital 2.0 Mono)
- Subtitles: English
- Supplements: None
- Region 1, NTSC

Fox – Bruce Lee Ultimate Collection (America)

- Released: 18 October 2005
- Aspect ratio: Widescreen (2:35:1) anamorphic
- Sound: Cantonese (Dolby Digital 2.0 Mono), Manadarin (Dolby Digital 2.0 Mono), English (DTS 5.1), English (Dolby Digital 5.1)
- Subtitles: English
- Supplements: Original trailer, new trailer, still photos, slideshow of photos, interview with Tung Wai, bonus trailers
- Region 1, NTSC

Hong Kong Legends – Special Collector's Edition (United Kingdom)

- Released: 6 November 2000
- Aspect ratio: Widescreen (2:35:1) anamorphic
- Sound: Cantonese (Dolby Digital 2.0 Dual Mono), English (Dolby Digital 2.0 Dual Mono)
- Subtitles: English, Dutch
- Supplements: Commentary by Bey Logan, production photo gallery, animated biography showcase of Bruce Lee with voice over, original Mandarin trailer, Hong Kong promotional trailer, UK promotional trailer, bonus trailers
- Region 2, PAL

Hong Kong Legends – Platinum Edition (United Kingdom)

- Released: 23 October 2006
- Aspect ratio: Widescreen (2:35:1) anamorphic
- Sound: Cantonese (Dolby Digital 2.0 Stereo), Cantonese (Dolby Digital 2.0 Dual Mono), English (2.0 Dual Mono)
- Subtitles: English, Dutch
- Supplements: Disc 1: Commentary by Andrew Staton and Will Johnston, bonus trailers; Disc 2: UK platinum trailer, UK promotional trailer, original Mandarin trailer, Hong Kong promotional trailer, rare uncut 8 mm UK trailer, original 35 mm UK title sequence, textless 35 mm title sequence, original lobby cards, "Paul Weller: Breaking the West", "Fred Weintraub: A Rising Star", "Tom Kuhn: What Might Have Been", "The History of The Big Boss: A Photographic Retrospective", "Deleted Scenes Examined: The Story of the Elusive Original Uncut Print", animated biography showcase of Bruce Lee with voice over, DVD credits
- Region 2, PAL

=== Blu-ray Disc release ===
Kam & Ronson (Hong Kong)

- Released: 6 August 2009
- Aspect ratio: Widescreen (2:35:1)
- Sound: Cantonese (DTS-HD Master Audio 7.1), Cantonese (Dolby True HD 7.1), Mandarin (Dolby Digital EX 6.1), Thai (Dolby Digital EX 6.1)
- Subtitles: Traditional Chinese, English, Thai
- Supplements: Tung Wai interview
- Region A

Bruce Lee: His Greatest Hits (Criterion Collection #1036) Disc 1

- Released: 14 July 2020
- Aspect ratio: Widescreen (2:35:1)
- Sound: Original Mandarin Mono, Original English-Dubbed Mono, Cantonese Mono, Mandarin with score by Peter Thomas Mono
- Subtitles: English
- Supplements: Commentary by Brandon Bentley, Commentary by Mike Leeder, Alternative Footage, Archival Program "Bruce Lee: The Early Years", "Bruce Lee vs Peter Thomas" on Peter Thomas' score, "On The Big Boss" making-of, TV Spots and Trailers, Leaflet shared with accompanying discs of Fist of Fury, The Way of the Dragon, Enter the Dragon, Game of Death and its sequel, alongside the extended "Special Edition" of Enter the Dragon.
- Region A

== See also ==
- Bruce Lee filmography
