= Snake & Crane Arts of Shaolin =

1978 Hong Kong film by Chen Chi-hwa

- Theatrical poster
- Directed by: Chen Chi-hwa
- Written by: Chang Hsin-yi
- Produced by: Lo Wei; Li Hwa-hsu
- Starring: Jackie Chan; Nora Miao
- Cinematography: Chen Chung-yuan
- Edited by: Huang Chih-hsiung
- Music by: Leung Chow Fook
- Production company: Lo Wei Motion Picture Company
- Release date: 8 March 1978
- Running time: 100 minutes
- Country: Hong Kong
- Language: Mandarin
- Box office: HK$662,851 (Hong Kong); 506,333 tickets (overseas)

Snake & Crane Arts of Shaolin (Chinese: 蛇鶴八步) is a 1978 Hong Kong martial arts film starring Jackie Chan and directed by Chen Chi-hwa. It was released by the Lo Wei Motion Picture Company, a subsidiary of Golden Harvest. Along with Tu Wi Ho, Chen was also the film's stunt co-ordinator.

== Plot ==
Hsu Ying Fung quickly makes it known (with some help) that he possesses the "Eight Steps of the Snake and Crane", a martial arts manual illustrating the ultimate fighting style. The book was written by eight Shaolin masters shortly before their disappearance, and Hsu is suspected of killing them, or at least knowing what happened. In reality, Hsu is looking for the man responsible for the masters' disappearance, whom he will know by a certain mark.

After several fights, and encounters with the leaders of many fighting clans (all of whom want the book and are willing to offer a variety of things for it), Hsu is betrayed, hurt, and eventually captured. He escapes with an unlikely ally in tow, while the rest of the clan leaders, having put aside their differences, search high and low for him. Eventually Hsu finds the man with the mark, the other clan leaders learn the fate of the Shaolin masters, and in an epic fight involving the Snake and Crane style, Hsu defeats the villain.

== Cast ==
- Jackie Chan as Hsu Yin-fung (credited as Jacky Chan)
- Nora Miao as Tang Ping-er
- Chin Kang as Master Chin the Black Dragon Gang
- Kim Jeong-ran as Hung Chu / Yellow Pearl
- Lee Yeong-guk as Shi Ping-fang
- Lau Nga-ying as Lady Sun
- Miao Tian as Leader Gu
- Lee Man-tai as Old Beggar
- Wu Te-shan as Oddball Lu
- Tung Lin as Master Huang of Fort Tiger
- Wang Quen as Lady Sun double
- Lu Ping as Hung Chu's uncle
- Ho Kang as Restaurant owner
- Lin Chao-hsiung as Ping-er's guard
- Li Min-lang as Lady Sun's guard
- To Wai-wo as Ting brother

== Box office ==
In Hong Kong, the film grossed HK662,851.30. Overseas, the film sold 161,021 tickets in Seoul City (South Korea) and 345,312 tickets in France (where it released in 1984), for a combined 506,333 tickets sold overseas in Seoul and France.

== Home media ==
- In February 2001, Seven 7 released the French theatrical cut on DVD, entitled Le Magnifique. The film had the original aspect ratio of 2.35:1, but contained no English-language options or subtitles.
- In September 2001, Eastern Heroes released the film on DVD in the UK. This version was a shorter cut, and was cropped from 2.35:1 into 1.85:1. It also contained an English dub only.
- In March 2002, Columbia Tri-Star released the film in the US on DVD in 2.35:1 with both an English dub and the original Mandarin soundtrack. However, this version was dubtitled and missing over 5 minutes of footage.
- In February 2006, Universal Japan released the film in Japan on DVD. It was uncut for the first time on DVD, and in 2.35:1 ratio, with a Mandarin soundtrack. However, this release featured no English subtitles.
- In May 2007, UK company Hong Kong Legends released the most complete English-friendly version of the film to date on DVD. It was fully uncut, presented in 2.35:1, and included an English dub and the original Mandarin soundtrack with newly translated English subtitles. However, the Mandarin "mono" is a downmix from the 5.1 remix.
- In November 2008, Media Movies and More released the film on DVD in Pan and scan format with English dubbing.
- Dragon Dynasty had intended to release a Region 1 DVD of the film, but the release has been postponed indefinitely.
- A Region B Blu-ray version of the film was released on February 11, 2019 by 88 Films UK. This version was made from a 2K restoration and contains the original Mandarin track along with Cantonese and English audio options. A subsequent Deluxe Collector Edition was released by 88 Films in January 2023, with a hardback book and rigid slipcase.

== See also ==
- List of Hong Kong films
- List of martial arts films
