= Man Lai =

- Chinese: 黎雯
- Born: 1916; Wuzhou, Guangxi, China
- Died: 1983 (aged 66–67); Hong Kong
- Other names: Lai Man, Li Wen, Lei Ming
- Occupation: Actress
- Years active: 1952–1977
- Relatives: Lau Wing (son)

Man Lai (Chinese: 黎雯) was a Chinese actress from Hong Kong. Lai is credited with over 630 films.

== Early life ==
In 1916, Lai was born in Wuzhou, Guangxi, China.

== Career ==
In 1952, Lai started her acting career. Lai debuted as a mother in Bride a la Mode, a 1952 comedy film directed by Chiang Wai-Kwong. Lai is known for her role as a mother or an aunt. Lai's last film was The Iron Fisted Monk (Chinese: 三德和尚與舂米六), a 1977 martial arts film directed by Sammo Hung. Lai is credited with over 630 films.

== Filmography ==
=== Films ===
This is a partial list of films.

- 1952 Bride a la Mode - Chi-Fung's mother
- 1953 Spring - 3rd Uncle's wife
- 1954 Autumn - Cheung
- 1955 Cold Nights (Chinese: 寒夜) - General's wife
- 1956 Madam Mei
- 1958 Marriage on the Rocks (Chinese: 婚變) - Ng's mother
- 1961 How to Get a Wife
- 1964 Pigeon Cage
- 1966 Spy with My Face - Chan's nurse maid
- 1967 A Gifted Scholar and a Beautiful Maid (aka Merry Maid)
- 1977 The Iron Fisted Monk (Chinese: 三德和尚與舂米六) - Liang's mother

== Personal life ==
Lai's son is Lau Wing. On April 4, 1983, Lai died in Hong Kong.

== See also ==
- Lai Cheuk-Cheuk
