= New Fist of Fury =

1976 Hong Kong film by Lo Wei

- 1976 film poster

Chinese name
- Traditional Chinese: 新精武門
- Simplified Chinese: 新精武门
Transcriptions
Standard Mandarin
- Hanyu Pinyin: Xīn Jīng Wǔ Mén
- Directed by: Lo Wei
- Written by: Lo Wei; Pan Lei
- Produced by: Hsu Li Hwa
- Starring: Jackie Chan; Nora Miao; Chan Sing
- Cinematography: Chan Chiu-yung; Chan Wing-shu
- Edited by: Lee Yim-hoi
- Music by: Frankie Chan
- Distributed by: Lo Wei Motion Film Productions
- Release date: 8 July 1976
- Running time: 118 minutes (1976 version); 82 minutes (1980 version)
- Country: Hong Kong
- Language: Mandarin
- Box office: US$155,677 (est.)

New Fist of Fury is a 1976 Hong Kong martial arts film directed by Lo Wei and starring Jackie Chan. It is the first of several films that Lo directed Chan in, and the first using Chan's stage name Sing Lung (Chinese: 成龍, literally meaning "becoming a dragon", by which Chan is still known today in Asia).

The film gave Chan his first starring role in a widely released film (his first starring role was in the Little Tiger of Canton, which only had a limited release in 1973). The film was a sequel to Bruce Lee's Fist of Fury, one of Lo Wei's biggest successes. Chan had previously appeared in the original Fist of Fury as a stuntman. New Fist of Fury was part of Lo's attempt to market Jackie Chan as the new Bruce Lee, and did not contain any of the comedy elements that were to be Chan's career trademark later on.

== Cast ==
- Jackie Chan / Cheng Long / Sing Lung as Ah Lung / Dragon
- Nora Miao as Mao Li Er / Miss Lee
- Chan Sing as Okimura
- Han Ying-chieh as Hung
- Luk Yat-lung as Lon Si Chun
- Yi Ming as Master Su, Mao's grandfather
- Suen Lam as Taiwan police captain Lin
- Cheng Siu-siu as Okimura's daughter
- Lau Ming as Ah Lung's mother
- Lo Wei as Inspector
- Chiang Kam as Sampo
- Liu Ping as Lin Chin Kui
- Bruce Lee as Chen Jun (extra)

== Alternate versions ==
- In 1976, the film was released in Mandarin with a counterpart English version for export.
- To capitalise on Jackie Chan's success with The Young Master, the film was re-edited (removing 40 minutes of footage), given a Cantonese soundtrack and re-released in 1980.

== Plot ==
=== 1976 version ===
A brother and sister escape from Japanese-occupied Shanghai to Japanese-occupied Taiwan to stay with their grandfather, who runs a kung fu school there. However, the head of a karate school in Taiwan wants to bring all other schools on the island under his domination, and part of his plan involves the murder of the grandfather. Undaunted, the two siblings reestablish their grandfather's school, leading to a final confrontation with the karate master. Jackie Chan plays a young thief who initially shuns kung fu, but realizes that he can no longer stand by and let the Japanese trample on the rights of the Chinese people. He proves extremely adept at the martial arts and carries the fight to its conclusion.

=== 1980 version ===
A young Taiwanese thief steals a nunchaku after fighting two Japanese men, whom he assumes belong to a nearby Japanese kung fu school (Da Yang Gate). The school offers him a job at a casino but he refuses, and he is beaten up as a result. He is rescued by the surviving members of the Jingwu school and they invite him to Mao Li Uhr's grandfather's 80th birthday celebration, where a group of Japanese decide to gatecrash. This causes the grandfather to die of a heart attack. The Jingwu students acquire his home and convert it into a new school. The Japanese council closes the school and the thief realizes that he can no longer stand by and let the Japanese trample on the rights of the Chinese people. He proves extremely adept at the martial arts and carries the fight to its conclusion.

== Box office ==
In Hong Kong, the film grossed HK$456,787.20 (US$93,222). Upon its 1988 release in South Korea, it sold 11,421 tickets in Seoul, equivalent to an estimated gross revenue of approximately ₩45.684 million (US$62,455). This adds up to an estimated total gross of approximately US$155,677 in Hong Kong and Seoul, equivalent to US$880,000 adjusted for inflation.

== DVD releases ==
- On 18 June 2001, Seven 7 released the French theatrical version in 2.35:1 entitled La Nouvelle Fureur De Vaincre. The DVD featured no other language options.
- On 12 March 2002, Columbia Tristar Home Entertainment released the 1976 version in 2.35:1 with Mandarin and English soundtracks. However, it featured dubtitles and is very slightly cut.
- On 25 March 2002, Eastern Heroes released an uncut version. However, this was cropped from 2.35:1 to 1.78:1 and only included an English dub. An extras was the export English trailer.
- On 25 October 2005, Universal Japan released the 1980 Cantonese version in 2.35:1, using newly restored materials from Fortune Star. However, it features no English subtitles.
- On 21 May 2007, Hong Kong Legends also released the 1980 version, but instead contained the first soundtrack of Mandarin (in abridged form) with newly translated English subtitles and an English dub. An extra is the first ten minutes of the export English version.

== See also ==
- Jackie Chan filmography
- List of Hong Kong films
- List of martial arts films
