= Viacom Productions =

Television production company

- Final logo, used from 1996 to 2004
- Formerly: CBS Films (1958–1967); CBS Enterprises (1967–1971); Viacom Enterprises (1971–1980)
- Type: Subsidiary
- Industry: Television production; Movie production; Sports production
- Founded: December 9, 1958; 67 years ago
- Defunct: June 15, 2004; 22 years ago
- Fate: Folded into Paramount Network Television
- Successor: Paramount Network Television
- Headquarters: Los Angeles, California, United States
- Products: Television production
- Parent: Viacom (1971–1994); Paramount Network Television (1994–2004)

Viacom Productions (formerly CBS Films, CBS Enterprises and Viacom Enterprises) was a television production arm of Viacom. Viacom Enterprises was also a movie producer, and a sports producer. The division was active from December 9, 1958 until June 15, 2004, when the company was folded into Paramount Network Television 10 years following Viacom's acquisition of Paramount Pictures, and led Perry Simon to move itself to Paramount for a production deal.

== History ==
=== CBS Films ===
In 1958, Leslie T. Harris, formerly of the syndicated company CBS Films (a forerunner to Viacom), decided to launch a new production unit of CBS Films dedicated to the production shows for netwoks and syndication. Leslie T. Harris later left in 1959, and was succeeded by Robert F. Lewine, whose intention is on quality.

In late 1959, Jess Oppenheimer, writer of I Love Lucy, signed a deal with CBS Films' production unit to develop television progams for network and syndication. The only show the production company had under its name was Angel, a short-lived sitcom airing on CBS from 1960 to 1961, before the production unit went inactive.

In 1960, the company inked deals with Herb Meadow and Ralph Levy to expand on CBS Films' production output.

In 1967, CBS Films was rebranded to CBS Enterprises, and in 1969, founder Ralph Baruch wanted to seek emphasis on CBS Enterprises' production output, before the split.

=== Viacom Enterprises ===
On July 6, 1970, it was announced that CBS Enterprises was spun-out from its parent company and it was renamed to Viacom Enterprises. The spin-off was completed on January 1, 1971, and the production and distribution divisions rebranded under the Viacom Enterprises name as a spin-off of CBS because it was against the FCC regulations for a television network to distribute its programs under its own name. Freed from CBS, the company began handling the production and distribution of films around the same time to produce first-run television series airing on the major networks.

The company was originally reborn in 1971 as a unit of Viacom International by Irving Wilson, who was of CMA, to develop and produce television programming at syndication and networks. For the first few years of existence, it shared the same name as its syndication counterpart, also called Viacom Enterprises.

In 1972, Viacom hired Richard S. Reisberg, formerly of NBC, to develop production and programming of in-house television programs and making deals with independent producers. In 1974, Irving Wilson left Viacom to start a new production company at Universal Television. In 1976, Viacom signed its contract with Dean Hargrove to develop television programming after leaving Universal Television.

In 1977, after failed attempts to launch prime-time shows, Viacom decided to set up its own unit for prime-time programming, which was headed by Richard S. Reisberg, who had also saw program acquisition activities. After that, Viacom entered into a deal with writer William Blinn and director Jerry Thorpe to develop television progamming in collaboration with ABC. Also that year, television writer Hal Sitowitz had signed a deal with Viacom to develop television projects.

The first primetime television show, movie, or sports to be produced by Viacom Productions for the ABC network was The MacKenzies of Paradise Cove. The studio had development contracts with independent writers and producers. The studio continues to grow by signing more production deals in hopes of becoming an independent major producer.

=== Viacom Productions ===
In October 1980, the primetime television unit was incorporated as Viacom Productions under Reisberg, in an effort to consolidate the parent company's network programming and production, so not to confuse it with the syndicated counterpart, which retained the Viacom Enterprises name. The following year, Richard S. Reisberg left Viacom Productions after 9 years, and subsequently joined United Artists Television in a new production division.

In 1984, Thomas D. Tannenbaum became president of the studio. He eventually left the company in 1991. In 1985, the company hit its mark when the company made its signature relationship with producer Fred Silverman and Dean Hargrove to develop a series of hits on networks, the first being a series of Perry Mason made-for-TV movies, which was followed by Matlock, Jake and the Fatman, Father Dowling Mysteries, and Diagnosis: Murder, these gain the massive recognition of the studio and revenue.

In 1991, Dick Berg's Stonehenge Productions inked an exclusive deal with Viacom Productions to develop television programming. In 1992, Viacom teamed up with Paramount Network Television to take an interest in the sitcom Flying Blind and became equal partners of the sitcom.

=== Paramount ownership and fold ===
On March 11, 1994, Viacom acquired Paramount Communications, Inc. and Viacom Enterprises was folded into Paramount Domestic Television, by transferring the domestic rights of the Viacom library. Viacom International was later reorganized as the parent company of MTV Networks and Showtime Networks. Viacom transferred the international rights of the said library into Paramount International Television, while Viacom Productions was reincorporated as a production sub-division of Paramount Television. The first hit came after the acquisition was Sabrina, the Teenage Witch, a show ABC aired from 1996 to 2000, followed by a run on The WB from 2000 to 2003.

Viacom Productions was folded into Paramount Network Television in 2004, amid financial troubles brought on to Viacom. The final two series to end under the Viacom Productions name are Ed and The Division. Perry Simon, who was the company's president, moved on to launch Shore View Entertainment as a successor to the company, which was affiliated with Paramount Network Television.

== Viacom Pictures ==
Viacom Pictures
- Industry: Film production
- Founded: 1989; 37 years ago
- Defunct: 1996; 30 years ago
- Fate: Folded into Viacom Productions
- Successor: Viacom Productions
- Headquarters: Los Angeles, California, United States
- Parent: Viacom Productions

From 1989 to 1996, Viacom Productions produced some theatrical films and television films (primarily Showtime) under the brand Viacom Pictures. The company mainly primarily produced television films, though it stopped in 1996 and further Showtime originals and made-for-TV films carried the Viacom Productions moniker.

The company was originally formed in 1989 by Viacom, and decided to produce made-for-television films for Showtime in North America, and distributed in worldwide syndication by its subsidiary Viacom Enterprises, in an effort to compete with HBO, who produced films through its HBO Pictures subsidiary.

In 1990, the company signed a distribution deal with Media Home Entertainment to handle home video distribution releases of its titles. The company's first production was to be Fourth Story, which was produced by The Konigsberg/Sanitsky Company.

In 1991, the company signed with AAA International to handle French theatrical rights to the title Paris Trout. Also that year, the company begin handling pre-sales of the company's titles to other distributors. Later that year, in October, the company signed a deal with Pioneer LDC for Japanese distribution of the company's film titles.

In 1992, it partnered with PolyGram Filmed Entertainment to release its only theatrical title, Kalifornia.

In 1992, the company was transferred into a subsidiary of Showtime via the Showtime Entertainment Group division of Showtime Networks in an effort to expand into film production and Fred Schneier subsequently left the company to form its own film production company FSA Film Enterprises. In February 1993, Viacom closed its international theatrical sales arm.

=== Films ===
Release date	Title	Notes
September 8, 1990	Rainbow Drive	co-production with ITC Entertainment and Dove, Inc.
January 19, 1991	Fourth Story	co-production with The Konigsberg/Sanitsky Company
April 20, 1991	Paris Trout	co-production with The Konigsberg/Sanitsky Company
June 22, 1991	Payoff	co-production with Aurora Productions
January 25, 1992	Keeper of the City	
July 25, 1992	Nails	co-production with Empress Productions Inc.
August 9, 1992	The Fear Inside	
September 12, 1992	Devlin	
May 22, 1993	Scam	
June 6, 1993	Taking the Heat	co-production with Neal & Gary Productions
September 3, 1993	Kalifornia	co-production with PolyGram Filmed Entertainment and Propaganda Films
September 5, 1993	The Wrong Man	co-production with Beattie/Chesser Productions
June 12, 1994	Past Tense	co-production with Arnold Kopelson Productions
July 31, 1994	Roswell	co-production with Citadel Entertainment
October 22, 1995	Down Came a Blackbird	co-production with Canticleer Films
January 28, 1996	Mrs. Munck	

== Filmography ==
Title	Years	Network	Notes
Angel	1960–1961	CBS	co-production with Burlingame Productions
The Harlem Globetrotters Popcorn Machine	1974–1975	CBS	co-production with Funhouse Productions and Yongestreet Productions
The New Adventures of Mighty Mouse and Heckle & Jeckle	1979–1981	CBS	co-production with Filmation
Dear Detective	1979	CBS	co-production with Kibee-Hargrove Productions
The MacKenzies of Paradise Cove	1979	ABC	co-production with Blinn/Thorpe Productions
The Lazarus Syndrome	1979	ABC	co-production with Blinn/Thorpe Productions
American Dream	1981	ABC	co-production with Mace Neufield Productions
Nurse	1981–1982	CBS	co-production with Robert Halmi, Inc.
The Devlin Connection	1982	NBC	co-production with Jerry Thorpe Productions and Mammoth Films, Inc.
Amanda's	1983	ABC	co-production with E&L Productions
Ace Crawford, Private Eye	1983	CBS	co-production with Conway Enterprises
The Master	1984	NBC	co-production with Michael Sloan Productions
Me and Mom	1985	ABC	co-production with Hal Sitowitz Productions
Easy Street	1986–1987	NBC	
Matlock	1986–1995	NBC/ABC	co-produced by The Fred Silverman Company (Intermedia Entertainment Company in season 1) and Dean Hargrove Productions (Strathmore Productions in seasons 1–2), (season 9 only)
Frank's Place	1987–1988	CBS	
Mighty Mouse: The New Adventures	1987–1988	CBS	co-production with Bakshi-Hyde Ventures
Jake and the Fatman	1987–1992	CBS	co-produced by The Fred Siverman Company and Dean Hargrove Productions (Strathmore Productions in season 1)
Father Dowling Mysteries	1987–1991	NBC/ABC	co-produced by The Fred Silverman Company and Dean Hargrove Productions
Snoops	1989–1990	CBS	co-production with Tima Love Productions and Solt/Egan Company
Max Monroe: Loose Cannon	1990	CBS	co-production with Dean Hargrove Productions
The Marshall Chronicles	1990	ABC	co-production with Sweetum Productions
Flying Blind	1992–1993	Fox	co-production with Sweetum Productions and Paramount Network Television
Key West	1993	Fox	
Diagnosis: Murder	1993–2001	CBS	co-produced by The Fred Silverman Company and Dean Hargrove Productions
Deadly Games	1995–1997	UPN	
Townies	1996	ABC	
The Adventures of Corduroy	1996–1997	home video only	co-produced by Graz Entertainment
Sabrina, the Teenage Witch	1996–2003	ABC/The WB	co-produced by Archie Comics, Hartbreak Films, and Finishing the Hat Productions (for season 1 only)
Oz	1997–2003	HBO	seasons 4–5 only; co-production with The Levinson/Fontana Company and Rysher Entertainment
The Hoop Life	1999–2000	Showtime	
The Beat	2000	UPN	
Ed	2000–2004	NBC	co-produced with NBC Productions and Worldwide Pants
The Division	2001–2004	Lifetime	co-produced by Kedzie Productions
Baby Bob	2002–2003	CBS	
Jake 2.0	2003–2004	UPN	
The Handler	2003-2004	CBS	co-production with Haddock Entertainment
The 4400	2004–2007	USA Network	season 2 by Paramount Network Television, last 2 seasons by CBS Paramount Network Television

=== Note ===
The 4400 continued as a Paramount Network Television production for season 2. The show became a CBS Paramount Network Television production for its last two seasons after the Viacom/CBS split at the end of 2005.

All shows from Viacom Productions are now owned by CBS Studios Productions, LLC., a holding company, and distributed by CBS Media Ventures.

== See also ==
- Paramount Television
- Paramount Television Studios
- CBS Studios, formerly CBS Paramount Television and CBS Television Studios
- CBS Media Ventures, formerly CBS Television Distribution
- Viacom Enterprises
- Viacom (1952–2005)
