= The Chase (1971 film) =

1971 Hong Kong film by Wong Tin-lam

- Film poster
- Directed by: Wong Tin Lam
- Written by: Wong Tin Lam
- Produced by: Raymond Chow Man Wai
- Starring: Maria Yi; James Tien
- Cinematography: Chris Chen Ching-Chu
- Edited by: Sung Ming
- Music by: Wang Fu-Ling
- Production company: Golden Harvest Company
- Distributed by: American International Pictures (US)
- Release date: 7 October 1971 (Hong Kong)
- Running time: 81 minutes
- Country: Hong Kong
- Languages: Mandarin; Cantonese

The Chase or Zhui Ji (Chinese: 追撃), released in North America and worldwide as The Shanghai Killers, is a 1971 Hong Kong action film with sword fighting directed by Wong Tin Lam. It stars Maria Yi and James Tien.

The film entered the North American box office charts in August 1973, before eventually topping the chart in September. It briefly overtook the Bruce Lee film Enter the Dragon, before it regained the top spot several weeks later.

== Cast ==
- Maria Yi Dut
- James Tien Chun
- Gam Saan
- Fong Sam
- Wu Jiaxiang
- Tang Ching
- Yam Ho
- Cheung Hei
- Lee Man Tai
- Chai Lin Fui
- Jason Pai Piao
