= St. Teresa's School Kowloon =

Primary school & kindergarten in Hong Kong

Coordinates: 22.3264°N 114.1777°E

- Chinese: 九龍聖德肋撒英文學校

Location
- 12號 Belfran Road; Prince Edward; Yau Tsim Mong; Hong Kong

Information
- School type: Private Co-ed Primary School & Kindergarten
- Motto: Latin: Maior Est Caritas ("The Greatest is Love")
- Established: 20 October 1952
- Founder: Mrs. Maria Lourdes Bau
- Category: Non-profit-making
- Supervisor: Fr. Lok
- School number: 210382
- Principal: Miss Fang Po Ling
- Grades: K.1 - P.6
- Enrollment: 80+
- Campus: Non-Residential
- Colour: Brown
- Affiliation: Roman Catholic
- Website: www.stsalumni.com

St. Teresa's School Kowloon (STS, Chinese: 九龍聖德肋撒英文學校) was a Roman Catholic co-educational day school, with primary and kindergarten sections, on Prince Edward Road in Kowloon, Hong Kong. It was known for its high academic standard and strict school discipline.

== History ==
On 8 September 1952 St. Teresa's Parish priest Father Orlando's long-cherished dream - a primary school to accommodate Catholic boys - was materialized in the birth of St. Teresa's School. St Teresa's School was founded by Mrs. Maria Lourdes Bau in Hong Kong in 1952. Its first premises were situated in Boundary Street with only three bright and gaily decorated classrooms. In 1954 it moved into St. Teresa's Church compound at Prince Edward Road and remain at the same site till present. The number of pupils had since grown steadily from its original enrollment of 140 pupils to 450 pupils in 1957. There were two sessions: A. M. Session (English) and P. M. Session (Chinese). Both sessions comprised kindergarten and primary classes and were co-educational. The atmosphere in the school was a happy one, and individual attention to the students rules foremost in the daily routine of the staff.

Its position in the church compound enabled St. Teresa's School to participate in all the church activities and to benefit unceasingly from the spiritual care and guidance of its supervisor and Parish Priest, Father Orlando and other Rev. Fathers of St. Teresa's Church.

The STS School Logo was designed by Mrs. Maria Lourdes Bau's husband Mr. Bau when the School was set up. Mrs. Maria Bau was close to the Portuguese family community at the time, and STS recruited quite a large number of Portuguese teachers during the early decades in the 1950s, 60's and 70's.

== Principals ==
Founding Principal Mrs. Maria Lourdes Bau (1952–1996)
Second Principal Sister Cecilia Wong (1996–1998)
Present Principal Miss Fang Po Ling (1998–2008)

The first School Director was Rev. Father C. M. Orlando, the Parish Priest of St. Teresa's Church.

== Admission, study and graduation ==
Since STS was a Catholic School, most of the pupils admitted or their parents were either Catholic or had a strong attachment to the Catholic Church. Many pupils who started Primary 1 would have come directly from the STS Kindergarten. STS used English as its primary teaching language for all subjects except the few directly Chinese-related ones. STS had two classes, one in the morning and one in the afternoon. Catholic prayers were the norm at the beginning and ending of a day's class. In the earlier days, the classes were classified into English class and Chinese class. STS had had both local Chinese teaching staff from the start as well as westerner (many of them are Portuguese) teaching staff during the earlier period. However, over time the teachers became more localized. All teachers and staff at STS had been women, and the pupil male/female split ratio had been about 7:3. An average class size varied between 26 - 33 pupils per class. At her peak, STS had over 25 teachers and over 600 pupils. The school fees in 2007-8 were about HKD1,400-/month for primary school pupils and about HKD1,200-/month for Kindergarten pupils. STS attracted not only local Chinese pupils, but also had a smaller percentage of pupils from families of different nationalities including Portuguese, British, American, Swiss, Italian, Japanese, Korean, Vietnamese, Indian and Indonesian etc. STS also saw a high percentage of her graduates entering other famous secondary schools in HK, like Wah Yan College, Kowloon, La Salle College, Diocesan Boys' School and Maryknoll Convent School.

School Founder Mrs. Maria Lourdes Bau announced her retirement after serving 45 years as the Principal of the School.

In 2002, STS celebrated its 50th anniversary.

An open group 'St Teresa's School, Kowloon' was created in Facebook with members reaching the important 600 mark in January, 2008.

In June, 2008 the School was permanently closed after graduation of the final Primary Six Class, and two K3 Classes, after completing her 56 years of mission.

The last STS Graduation Ceremony took place in June 2008 for the P6 Class (29 pupils) and two K3 classes (total 58 pupils).

The Grand Re-union party for all STS Alumni, their parents and former Principals & teachers took place on school premises in the afternoon on June 28, 2008.

== Publications ==
There has only been two publications made by the School to date.

The first issue was published in 1956, to mark the 5th anniversary since the founding of the School in 1952. The magazine was named Teresian with pink colour paper cover. There was a total of 58 pages printed in black and white inside the magazine.

The second publication was made in 2002, to mark the 50th anniversary since the founding of the School. It was a thicker issue of A4 size. The main colour of the cover and back cover was greenish, but without the word 'Teresian' on it.

However, the third and probably the final publication will be made by the end of 2008 to mark the closing chapter of the School, documenting some interesting highlights in the School's 56 years of education mission.

== STS Alumni Association ==
The Alumni Association's full name is 'St. Teresa's School Kowloon Alumni Association' registered as a legal Society with the HK Police in 2008 in accordance with the Society Ordinanace. The Alumni Association President is Catherine Lui and Vice-President Henry Yuen, with Alice Kwan as Secretary and Henry Chan as Treasurer.

== Notable alumni ==
- Michael Tien 田北辰, HK Deputy to the National People's Congress of the PRC, Former Chairman of KCRC and well-known businessman
- Loletta Chu 朱玲玲, Philanthropist, 1977 Miss Hong Kong Pageant
- Rosamund Kwan 關之琳, Film Actress
- Nora Miao 苗可秀, Former Film Actress, and current Radio Program Host in Toronto, Canada
- Kenneth Bi 畢國智, Film Director
- Jan Lamb 林海峰, Actor, Comedian, Radio DJ, Singer
- Daniel Chan 陳曉東, Actor and Singer
- Anthony Lun 倫永亮, Song Composer and Singer
- Louis Koo 古天樂, Film Actor
- Jo Koo 谷祖琳, Film Actress and Singer
