= Karafuto 1945 Natsu Hyōsetsu no Mon =

- DVD cover
- Directed by: Mitsuo Murayama
- Written by: Toshio Kaneko (book); Takeo Kunihiro (screenplay)
- Produced by: Toshio Mochizuki; Kōji Morita; Yutaka Takagi
- Starring: Terumi Niki; Yumiko Fujita; Kawai Okada; Keiko Torii; Hiromi Kurita
- Cinematography: Haruo Nishiyama
- Music by: Seiji Yokoyama
- Distributed by: Toei Company
- Release date: August 17, 1974 (Japan)
- Running time: 120 minutes
- Country: Japan
- Language: Japanese
- Budget: 500 million yen

Karafuto 1945 Natsu Hyōsetsu no Mon (Japanese: 樺太1945年夏 氷雪の門; lit. Karafuto 1945 Summer: Gate of Ice and Snow), also called Gate of Ice, is a 1974 Japanese war film based on the Soviet Union's invasion of Karafuto during the Soviet–Japanese War near the end of World War II. The movie is set in Maoka (present day Kholmsk), and the story is based on the deaths of nine women who worked in the postal telegraph office in the city. Twelve women worked in the office, and on August 20, 1945, nine of them committed suicide.

== Plot ==
The film is set in Karafuto after the radio broadcast of the Imperial Rescript on the Termination of the War. On August 15, 1945, Soviet forces invaded Karafuto. The Japanese population began to evacuate while remaining Imperial Japanese Army personnel, heavily outnumbered, slowed the Soviet advance for as long as they were able. The Soviets engaged in widespread kidnapping, rape, and killings of any civilians who were unable to escape. On August 20, the postal telegraph office in Maoka suspended operations and nine of the twelve telephone operators committed suicide by taking potassium cyanide to avoid capture by Soviet troops.

== Pressure by the USSR ==
Despite the film's release in many nations, including the Soviet Union, Moscow argued that the film defamed the Soviet Union and the Soviet people and would only make people more hostile towards the USSR. The movie was eventually banned in the Soviet Union after two weeks' distribution in Hokkaidō and western Kyūshū. On August 25, 2008, a Japanese television drama was aired called Kiri no Hi, which was based on the same historical events. However, the television drama caused less of a political uproar in Russia than Karafuto 1945 Summer Hyosetsu no Mon, due to the movie's insistence that it was a work of "fiction" and because it did not focus on the Red Army's crimes and brutality but instead talked about a wish for world peace.

== Re-release ==
On July 17, 2010, when the film was almost 36 years old, it was re-released in various theatres worldwide.

== Original cast ==
- Terumi Niki as Ritsuko Sekine
- Yumiko Fujita as Ayako Sakamoto
- Kawai Okada as Natsuko Saito
- Keiko Torii as Nobue Fujikura
- Keiko Nomura as Yumi Sihida
- Nishiki Imadegawa as Keiko Torigai
- Takako Yagi as Masako Horie
- Fusako Aihara as Takako Kanzaki
- Kaoru Kiryū as Sumiko Aoki
- Mari Okamoto as Tomoko Katori
- Midori Kiuchi as Yayoi Nakamura
- Yōko Minamida as Husae Yasukawa
- Takahiro Tamura as Norio Yasukawa
- Gō Wakabayashi as Tadao Hisamitsu
- Hiromi Kurita as Mihoko Sugawara
- Shinichirō Mikami as Captain Yoshizaki
- Shōgo Shimada as Division Commander
- Shin Kishida as Military Commander
- Kenji Sahara as Toshikazu Okaya
- Mitsuo Hamada as Kiyoharu Nakanishi
- Yukiko Okada as Akiko Saitou
- Masao Imafuku as Tatsuzou Sekine
- Harue Akagi as Shizu Sekine
- Reiko Nanao as Kin Morimoto
- Tetsurō Tamba as Chief of staff
- Junkichi Orimoto as Kanzaki Yuichi
- Ichirō Izawa as Ryousuke Huzikura
- Toshio Kurosawa as Muraguchi
- Jūkei Fujioka as Regimental Commander Shimizu
- Minoru Chiaki as Planter
- Tetsu Mizuno as Osamu

== See also ==
- Evacuation of Karafuto and Kuriles
- Soviet–Japanese War
- Soviet war crimes
