= Naughty, Naughty (1974 film) =

1974 Hong Kong film by Lo Wei

Naughty! Naughty!
- Film poster
- Chinese: 綽頭狀元
- Directed by: Lo Wei
- Screenplay by: Lo Wei
- Produced by: Raymond Chow
- Starring: Sam Hui; Nora Miao; Leung Sing-Bor; Dean Shek; Angela Mao
- Cinematography: Chang Yao-Tsu
- Edited by: Kuo Chung Chang
- Music by: Joseph Koo
- Production company: Golden Harvest
- Release date: 18 July 1974 (Hong Kong)
- Running time: 109 minutes
- Country: Hong Kong
- Language: Cantonese

Naughty! Naughty! (Chinese: 綽頭狀元) is a 1974 Hong Kong comedy film directed by Lo Wei. It stars Sam Hui as a young con-man.

The movie features Hui singing lyricist James Wong's song《一水隔天涯》.

== Plot ==
Wu Te-chuan, a young man, is penniless and he is a conman. He is about to be thrown out of a Macau hotel, but he gets help from Hsiao Yen, a kind-hearted hotel maid. He had to flee to Hong Kong. In Hong Kong, he helped Hsin, a painter, by convincing him that his paintings will sell if he pretends to be dead. Both Wu and Hsin teamed up and engaged in con games, gambling and sex, but the ring enforcers caught up to them. After Wu falls in love with Hsiao Yen, he wanted to turn his life around.

== Cast ==
- Sam Hui - Wu Te-Chuan
- Nora Miao as Hsiao Yen
- Leung Sing-Bor
- Dean Shek as Auntie Six's husband
- Angela Mao - Cameo
- Cheng Gwan-min
- Sai Gwa-Pau
- Szema Wah Lung
- Carter Wong
- Alan Chui Chung-San
- Corey Yuen
- James Tien
- Tony Liu
- Wu Wei
