= The Champion (1973 film) =

1973 Hong Kong film by Chu-got Ching-wan and Yang Ching-chen

- 豪客
- Directed by: Chu-got Ching-wan; Yang Ching-chen
- Written by: Chu-got Ching-wan
- Produced by: Run Run Shaw
- Starring: Chin Han; Shih Szu; Yi Yuan; Lung Fei; Han Su; Chin Tu; Lau Kwan; Shih Chung-Tien
- Cinematography: Yan-Chien Chuang
- Edited by: Ting-Hung Kuo
- Music by: Fu-Liang Chou
- Release date: 1973
- Country: Hong Kong
- Language: Cantonese

The Champion (Chinese: 豪客), released in the United States as Shanghai Lil and the Sun Luck Kid and also known as Karate King and Chivalrous Guest, is a 1973 Martial Arts Hong Kong film directed by Chu-got Ching-wan and Yang Ching-chen.

== Plot ==
Lu Fu was imprisoned for a crime he did not commit. Upon release, Lu Fu returns to his coal-mining hometown to find that his brother, Lu Te-Piao, has taken over the town and imprisoned their sister, Ah Chu.

== Cast ==
- Chin Han – Lu Fu
- Shih Szu – Ah Chu
- Yi Yuan – Yung Tien (Nagata)
- Lung Fei – Lu Te-piao
- Han Su – Undertaker Hsu
- Chin Tu – Chuan Fu
- Lau Kwan – Ta Kuei-tzu
- Shih Chung-Tien – Karateka Katsumasa

== See also ==
- List of Shaw Brothers films
- Hong Kong films of 1973
