= Lady Assassin =

1983 Hong Kong film by Chin Ku Lu

The Lady Assassin
- 清宮啟示錄; Ching gung kai si luk
- Directed by: Chin-Ku Lu
- Written by: Chin-Ku Lu
- Produced by: Mona Fong Yat Wah
- Starring: Norman Chui, Leanne Liu, Jason Pai Piao, Tony Liu
- Cinematography: Chin Chiang Ma
- Music by: Chin Yung Shing, Chen-hou Su
- Production company: Shaw Brothers (Hong Kong) Ltd.
- Distributed by: Shaw Brothers (Hong Kong)
- Release date: January 15, 1983 (Hong Kong)
- Running time: 1 hr 26 min (86 min)
- Country: Hong Kong
- Language: Cantonese
- Box office: HK$ $876,247.00

The Lady Assassin is a 1983 Shaw Brothers film directed by Chin Ku Lu, starring Norman Chui, Leanne Liu, Tony Liu, and Jason Pai Piao.

== Plot ==
The villainous 4th Prince plots to change a royal edict proclaiming himself as heir to the throne instead of the Emperor's favoured fourteenth prince. The Fourth prince gets the backing of Han loyalists by promising that the Manchu rule of iron will soften when he is in power however he fails to keep his promise and turns against those that helped him.

== Cast ==
- Tony Liu as 4th Prince Yung Cheng
- Norman Chui as Tsang Jing
- Jason Pai Piao as Min Geng Yiu
- Ku Feng as Lui Liu Liang
- Leanne Liu (credited as Leanne Lau Suet-Wa) as Lui Si Niang
- Max Mok Siu-Chung as 14th Prince
- Ching Miao as Emperor Kang Hsi
- Cheung King-Yu as Pearl
- Yeung Jing-Jing as Jade
- Yuen Tak as Pak Tai Koon
- Kwan Fung as Lord Chang Tieh Yue
- Johnny Wang Lung-Wei as Lord Loong Foh Do
- Sun Chien as Kam Fung Chi
