= The Heroes (1980 film) =

1980 Hong Kong film by Wu Ma and Pao Hsueh-li

- Film poster
- Traditional Chinese: 俠骨英雄傳
- Simplified Chinese: 侠骨英雄传
- Hanyu Pinyin: Xiá Gǔ Yīng Xióng Chuán
- Jyutping: Hap6 Gwat1 Jing1 Hung4 Zyun2
- Directed by: Wu Ma; Pao Hsueh-li
- Written by: Ni Kuang; Katy Chin
- Produced by: Ko Fei; Katy Chin; Chen Tian Ching
- Starring: Ti Lung; Shih Szu; Danny Lee; Michael Chan; Dorian Tan
- Cinematography: James Wu
- Music by: Joseph Koo; Wong Mau San
- Distributed by: Ocean Shores
- Release date: 23 October 1980
- Running time: 90 minutes
- Country: Hong Kong
- Language: Mandarin

The Heroes, also known as The Shaolin Heroes, is a 1980 Hong Kong martial arts film directed by Wu Ma and Pao Hsueh-li and starring Ti Lung, Shih Szu and Danny Lee.

== Plot ==
During the Qing Dynasty, the imperial court views the righteous Shaolin Temple as an eyesore and sends a group of soldiers to destroy the temple, led by chief Ko Fei (Ti Lung), a former Shaolin disciple. After Shaolin was destroyed, all of its disciples were captured and detained. Although Ko made them work as hard labors, he was actually helping them increase their physical strength to refine their martial arts. On the surface, Ko seems to be working for the imperial court, but he was assisting his fellow disciples to recover Shaolin. However, his fellow disciples did not accept the token of his appreciation. Afterwards, the disciples fled and revolted before killing the Emperor (Michael Chan). At that time, Ko was also killed and his heroic deed was not known even after he died. Ko is considered a true hero who can tolerate the most insult and humiliation.

== Cast ==
- Ti Lung as Ko Fei / Wong Fei
- Shih Szu as Princess
- Danny Lee as Righteous Monk
- Michael Chan as Qing Emperor
- Dorian Tan as Si Ying
- Wong Chung as Fong Gau
- Wong Ching as Gap toothed official
- Goo Chang as Bald official
- Wu Ma as Ng Ging
- Tsai Hung
- Lee Ho
- Joh Yau
- Chan Pik Fung
- Sit Hon as Abbot
- Wong Yeuk ping
- Ma King Shun
- Cho Boon Feng
- Lau Yau Bun
- Wong Kwok Fai
- Robert Tai
- Ko Chang Sheng

== Theme song ==
- Hero (英雄)
  - Composer: Joseph Koo
  - Lyricist: Chang Cheh
  - Singer: Jenny Tseng

== Reception ==
J. Doyle Wallis of DVD Talk gave the film 4.5 out of 5 stars and a positive review praising it for having "one of the better plots in kung fu filmdom" as well as the action choreography and pacing.
