= Maria Yi =

Chinese actress from Hong Kong

- Chinese: 衣依
- Born: 29 July 1953 (age 73)
- Other names: Yi Yi, Maria Yi Dut Wei Lina
- Occupation: Actress
- Spouse: Xu Jingbo (m. 1974)

Chinese name
Transcriptions
Standard Mandarin
- Hanyu Pinyin: Yī Yī
Yue: Cantonese
- Jyutping: ji1 ji1

Maria Yi (born 29 July 1953) is a retired Chinese actress from Hong Kong. She appeared in films by Hong Kong's Golden Harvest Productions in the 1970s, most notably in The Big Boss and Fist of Fury, both starring Bruce Lee.

== Life and career ==
Yi began acting as a teenager and graduated from the Taipei Jinlu Women's Business Vocational School before her debut. Active in the school's entertainment programs and drama performances, Hong Kong Jiahe Film Company owner Zou Wenhuai unearthed Yi Yi in Taiwan, and arranged her training in Taiwan. She came to Hong Kong for the Golden Harvest Film Company in 1970. Filming a series of films, including The Big Boss and Fist of Fury, which is best known with the famous martial arts star Bruce Lee. She also co-produced a film with another martial arts star Jimmy Wang Yu. Yi Yi married a businessman Xu Jingbo in June 1974. One of her guests at her wedding was her friend and fellow actress Nora Miao. In 1976, her contract with Golden Harvest has expired, so she made her final film, Tiger of Northland.

== Filmography ==
=== Films ===
Year	Title	Role	Notes/Ref.
1971	The Chase	Chi Fang-fang	
1971	The Big Boss	Chow Mei	
1972	Fist of Fury	Yen	
1973	A Man Called Tiger	Keiko	
1973	Seaman No. 7	Hsiao Fang	
1973	Story of Mother	Chang Mei Chung	
1974	The Tournament		
1976	Tiger of Northland		(final film role)
