= Barbara Darrow =

American actress (1931–2018)

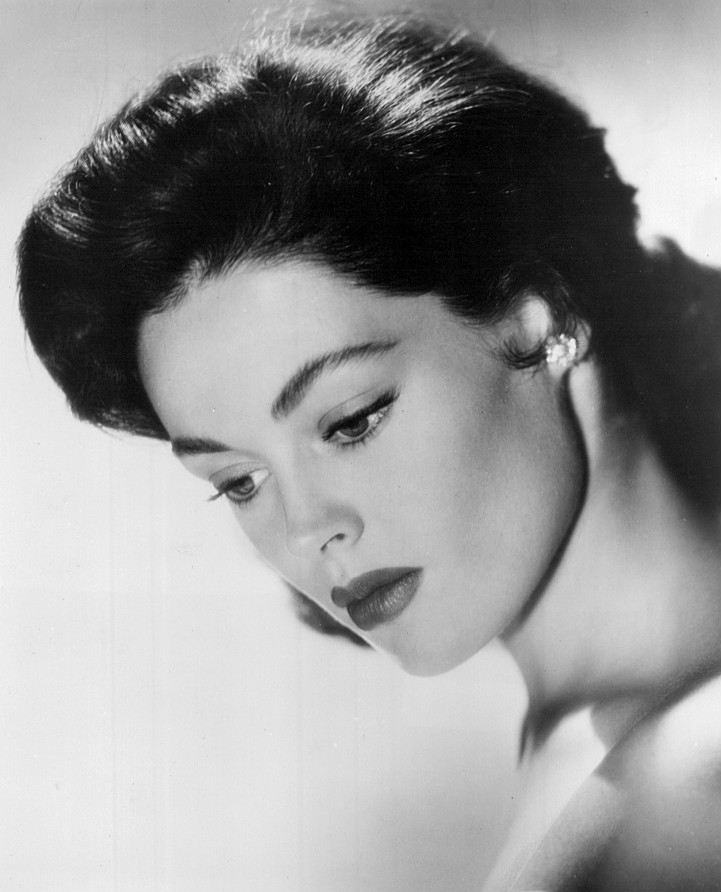
- Darrow in 1958
- Born: November 18, 1931; Hollywood, California, U.S.
- Died: August 26, 2018 (aged 86); Los Angeles, California, U.S.
- Resting place: Forest Lawn Memorial Park, Glendale, California
- Occupation: Actress
- Years active: 1950–1977
- Spouse: Thomas D. Tannenbaum (m. 1956; died 2001)
- Children: 3
- Relatives: John Darrow (uncle)

Barbara Darrow (November 18, 1931 - August 26, 2018) was an American motion picture and television actress.

== Early years ==
Darrow was born in Hollywood, California, to George H. Wittlinger, a motion-picture landscape artist, and Alice Simpson Wittlinger, a former silent-screen actress. She graduated from Hollywood High School.

== Career ==
Darrow's work as a model led to her receiving offers of film contracts. On August 31, 1950, a judge approved her seven-year contract with RKO Studios. She made mostly B-movies in the 1950s, including The Monster That Challenged The World and Queen of Outer Space. She replaced Marla English opposite Spencer Tracy in The Mountain, after English had an adverse reaction to a smallpox vaccine. By 1955, she was one of only three actors under contract to RKO.

On television, Darrow portrayed Nurse Forester in the NBC medical drama Doctors' Hospital. She also made several appearances in one or two episodes of popular television shows in the 1950s. Some of these include The George Burns and Gracie Allen Show, Bachelor Father, The Bob Cummings Show, M Squad, and Peter Gunn.

== Personal life ==
On September 28, 1956, Darrow married Thomas David Tannenbaum, son of David Tannenbaum (mayor of Beverly Hills for two terms in 1952 and 1956), and remained married until his death on December 1, 2001. A talent agent at MGM, he became the founding president of Viacom. They had three children.

Her youngest daughter Audrey married Bobby Darin and Sandra Dee's only child, Dodd Darin. Her son Eric Tannenbaum became president of Columbia TriStar Television at age 33; he later executive produced Two and a Half Men.

Darrow's uncle is John Darrow, a silent-film star turned successful agent, from whom she borrowed her stage name. Her older sister Madelyn Darrow became a model, and married tennis player Pancho Gonzales.

She died on August 26 2018 of a heart attack at aged 86.

== Filmography ==
=== Movies ===
- Tall Story - Frieda Jensen (1960)
- Queen of Outer Space - Kaeel (1958)
- The Monster That Challenged the World - Jody Sims (1957)
- The Mountain - Simone (1956)
- The Best Things in Life Are Free - Brenda (uncredited, 1956)
- Diane - Lady in Waiting (uncredited, 1956)
- Susan Slept Here - Miss Jennings (1954)
- The French Line - Donna Adams (1953)
- Grounds for Marriage - Pretty Girl (uncredited, 1951)
- A Life of Her Own (uncredited, 1950)

=== Television ===
- Switch - Nurse, Willie (2 episodes, 1977)
- Doctors Hospital - Nurse Forester (1975)
- Mission: Impossible - Proprietress (1972)
- Love, American Style - Helen, Elizabeth (2 segments, 1970–1971)
- Alcoa Theatre - The Silent Kill, Linda Hollander (1960)
- Tightrope - Lois (1 episode, 1959)
- Markham - Helen Dunhill (1 episode, 1959)
- Adventure Showcase - Linda Hollander (1 episode, 1959)
- Colt .45 - Nita (1 episode, 1959)
- M Squad - Shelly Dana (1 episode, 1959)
- Peter Gunn - Virginia Pelgram (1 episode, 1959)
- The Bob Cummings Show - Betty Jean, Lola (2 episodes, 1958–1959)
- Goodyear Theatre - Oma Jean (1 episode, 1958)
- Bachelor Father - Carol Spencer (1 episode, 1958)
- Mike Hammer - Sharon O'Closky (1 episode, 1958)
- The George Burns and Gracie Allen Show - Barbara Parker, Peggy, Sylvia (3 episodes, 1957–1958)
- G.E. True Theater - Rita (1 episode, 1957)
