= Shaolin Wooden Men =

1976 Hong Kong film by Chen Chi-hwa

- Theatrical poster
- Directed by: Chen Chi-hwa
- Written by: Gam Yam
- Produced by: Lo Wei
- Starring: Jackie Chan; Doris Lung Chun-erh; Chiang Kam; Kam Kong; Yuen Biao
- Cinematography: Chan Chung Yuen
- Edited by: Huang Chih-Hsiung; Li Yen-Hai
- Music by: Stanley Chow Fook-Leung
- Distributed by: Lo Wei Productions
- Release date: 10 November 1976
- Running time: 107 minutes
- Country: Hong Kong
- Language: Mandarin
- Box office: est. US$1 million (Asia); 375,484 tickets (overseas)

Shaolin Wooden Men (Chinese: 少林木人巷) (Shao Lin mu ren xiang) is a 1976 Hong Kong martial arts film directed by Chen Chi-hwa, written by Gam Yam, and produced by Lo Wei. The film stars Jackie Chan, with a supporting cast of Doris Lung Chun-erh, Chiang Kam, Kam Kong, and Yuen Biao. It was made at Lo Wei's studio at Golden Harvest, during the post-Bruce Lee era.

The film was also released internationally under several alternative titles, including:

- "36 Wooden Men"
- "Shaolin Chamber of Death" (initial UK releases)
- "Shaolin Wooden Men - Young Tiger's Revenge" (USA)
- "Wooden Man" (Germany)

== Plot ==
Little Mute (Jackie Chan) is a new Shaolin student who is mute. He struggles to keep up with the other students and to complete the grueling tasks assigned to him by his instructor. He is haunted by the memory of his father's murder at the hands of a masked bandit who was skilled in martial arts.

One night, Little Mute follows two monks to a secret cave behind a waterfall. A man is imprisoned there. Over time, Little Mute befriends the violent prisoner by bringing him food and wine that he steals from the monastery. He learns that the prisoner is a deadly martial artist who is developing a technique called the Lion’s Roar, which he will use to escape his captivity. Little Mute convinces the prisoner to train him. The prisoner's style aims to kill the opponent as fast as possible. A Shaolin nun sees Little Mute practicing these killing techniques. She tells him that martial arts are not for killing; rather, they are for self-development, with self-defense employed only when necessary and with minimal violence. She trains him in the Gliding Snake style, the ideals of which clash with those of the prisoner's killing style. Nevertheless, Little Mute continues to study both styles. Finally the prisoner judges that Little Mute is ready to attempt to pass the test of the Shaolin Wooden Men Alley, a narrow hallway containing thirty-six Shaolin Wooden Men, which are mechanical wooden dummies that attack anyone who enters the hallway. Little Mute successfully fights his way through the Wooden Men Alley.

Shortly after Little Mute's triumph, the prisoner perfects his Lion's Roar technique and uses it to escape. He resumes his former role as the leader of the infamous Green Dragon Gang, murdering the men who were responsible for his imprisonment. It is revealed that he was a Shaolin student who went renegade, and was then captured and imprisoned. The head abbot of Shaolin felt responsible for the student's misdeeds, so the abbot blinded himself and left the Shaolin Monastery to live as a hermit, appointing a new abbot in his place. However, he promised to help Shaolin in the future if it was needed.

Little Mute and the current head abbot of Shaolin seek out the hermit monk. The escaped prisoner has killed all those responsible for his imprisonment except the monks of Shaolin, and he is now on his way to destroy the monastery. The hermitic monk hands over a book containing the "ultimate" martial arts style, and Little Mute masters this style under the guidance of the current head abbot. When the escaped prisoner comes to destroy Shaolin, Little Mute stands ready to defend it against his former instructor. When the escaped prisoner uses the same secret punch that killed Little Mute's father, Little Mute reveals that he is not mute; he reveals that he swore never to speak until he had found his father's killer.

Little Mute counters his opponent's killing techniques, since he knows all of them. He creates multiple openings, but fails to exploit them due to the Shaolin nun's teachings, which said never to kill his opponent. Despite this, he manages to win. He offers to spare his former instructor on the condition that he returns to Shaolin for the remainder of his life. The escaped prisoner says that he is beyond salvation, but that it makes him proud that his student has learned so well. However, he then makes a final attempt to kill Little Mute. He grabs Little Mute from behind and attempts to crush his throat, but Little Mute moves out of the way, and the villain's strike hits his own throat, causing him to kill himself. Deprived of its leader, the Green Dragon Gang flees.

Little Mute returns to the Shaolin monastery and is ordained as a monk.

== Cast ==
- Jackie Chan
- Doris Lung Chun-erh
- Chiang Kam
- Kam Kong
- Yuen Biao
- Kong Kim
- Tu Wei Ho
- Tien Miao
- Lo Wei

== 1976/1980 versions ==
Two differently edited versions of the film may have been made - a Mandarin version (1976), and a slightly shortened version featuring a Cantonese dub in 1980 (the cut used for all known releases to date). In terms of the score, the English dub on all available releases matches the Cantonese version. However, it is not known if an English dub was ever recorded to sync to the Mandarin version.

When playing the Mandarin audio on existing (Cantonese version) releases, during a scene after Little Mute has tattooed his arms, the music jumps ahead to another part of the track. When played with the Cantonese soundtrack, the music plays without problem (revealing the segment of the music cut in the Mandarin soundtrack).

During the final fight scene, there are some abrupt jump cuts and as a result, the sound effects drop out of sync. It is possible that the film's action was tightened up in preparation for release (or the 1980 re-release) as it appears rather slowly executed by the actors.

== Box office ==
In Hong Kong, the film grossed HK$476,950.70 (US$97,337). Upon its 1982 release in South Korea, it sold 223,207 tickets in Seoul, equivalent to an estimated gross revenue of approximately ₩669.621 million (US$915,934). This adds up to an estimated total of approximately US$1,013,271 in East Asia, equivalent to US$5.7 million adjusted for inflation.

In France, the film sold 152,277 tickets upon release in 1983. This adds up to 375,484 tickets sold overseas in Seoul and France.

== Home media ==
- Winners Video released a DVD containing both Cantonese and Mandarin soundtracks and English subtitles. However, it is missing roughly 30 seconds, has very poor image quality and the aspect ratio is cropped from 2.35:1 to 1.33:1.
- On 15 February 2001, Seven 7 released the French-language theatrical version on DVD entitled L'impitoyable. It contains no Chinese or English options, but it was the first release to contain the full 2.35:1 image.
- On 27 December 2001, Eastern Heroes released an uncut version of the film on DVD under the title Shaolin Chamber Of Death. However, it was cropped from 2.35:1 to 1.78:1 and only contained an English dub. The first reel of the English-dubbed version was reportedly found to be damaged, so the first two scenes contain the original Mandarin soundtrack with English subtitles.
- On 17 September 2002, Columbia Tri-Star released the first Western DVD in its original Mandarin language, with newly translated English subtitles. However, the ratio was cropped from 2.35:1 to 1.78:1, the first 10 minutes was missing, and featured very poor video quality.
- On 24 February 2006, Universal Japan released the first uncut DVD in 2.35:1 (using newly restored materials from Fortune Star). However, this release contains the Cantonese dub, rather than the original Mandarin soundtrack.
- On 23 April 2007, Hong Kong Legends released an uncut DVD (again using newly restored materials from Fortune Star). However, despite the 2.35:1 video and newly translated subtitles, it contained the Cantonese dub (mono option also downmixed from the remix) in place of the original audio, and the English dub uses new voice artists for the first two scenes on account of the film's damaged first reel.
- Dragon Dynasty intended to release a Region 1 DVD of the film, originally scheduled for release on 30 October 2008, but the release has been postponed indefinitely.
- A Blu-ray release from 88 Films was released on November 9, 2020 in the United Kingdom. It features a new 2K restoration of the film.

== Influence ==
- The training dummies in this film are the inspiration for the character Mokujin in the Tekken series. They also make an appearance in the manga of Negima.
- At least three Kill Bill references originate with this film: Pai Mai's introduction scene references the stairway and water training scene; Pai Mai himself though in white in Kill Bill is the blind orange master monk (who in Kill Bill blinds Elle); and, finally, the five point finger exploding hand technique comes from the end battle scene of Shaolin Wooden Men where the villain uses a special punch technique on the protagonists but is only able to deliver 4 of the 5 blows (with the protagonist holding his heart, as Bill does, right before dying).

== See also ==
- Jackie Chan filmography
- List of Hong Kong films
- List of martial arts films
- Yuen Biao filmography
