= Kawai Okada =

Japanese actress and businesswoman

- 岡田可愛
- Born: October 19, 1948 (age 77); Ikuno-ku, Osaka, Japan
- Occupations: Actress; businesswoman

Kawai Okada (岡田可愛, Okada Kawai; born October 19, 1948 in Ikuno-ku, Osaka) is a Japanese former actress.

== Filmography ==
=== Films ===
- 1962 Foundry Town - Kaori
- 1963 A Legend or Was It?
- 1969 Red Lion
- 1972 Gecko Kung Fu
- 1973 A Man Called Tiger - Yoshida Ayako.
- 1974 Karafuto 1945 Summer Hyosetsu no Mon - Natsuko Saito

=== Television series ===
- 1969-1970 Wakadaishō series - Akiko Oshima
- 1969-1970 Sain wa V (TV series) - Yumi Asaoka
- 1979 Seibu Keisatsu

== Writings ==
- Shippai nante kowakunai (1998, published by KSS) ISBN 4-87709-289-7 - autobiography
