= Lo Wei =

Chinese film director (1918–1996)

- Born: 12 December 1918; Jiangsu Province, China
- Died: 20 January 1996 (aged 77); British Hong Kong
- Other names: Law Wai, Lo Wai, Loh Wei, Luo Wei, William Lowe
- Occupations: Film director; screenwriter; actor
- Years active: 1929–1993
- Awards: Golden Horse Awards – Lifetime Achievement Award; 1997

Chinese name
- Traditional Chinese: 羅維
- Simplified Chinese: 罗维
Transcriptions
Standard Mandarin
- Hanyu Pinyin: Luó Wéi

Lo Wei ( 12 December 1918 – 20 January 1996) was a Hong Kong film director and actor best known for launching the martial arts film careers of both Bruce Lee, in The Big Boss and Fist of Fury, and Jackie Chan, in New Fist of Fury.

== Career ==
Lo began his entertainment career as an actor in the Second World War. He moved to Hong Kong in 1948. During the 1950s, Lo became a popular matinee idol.

After Bruce Lee's death in 1973, it was Lo who gave Jackie Chan his first shot at the big time as part of the wave of Bruceploitation. Lo is said to have been linked with Chinese organized crime, the Triads.

Lo ran the production company "Lo Wei Motion Picture Company", which operated until 1977–78 due to heavy cost-cutting measures as a result of Jackie Chan signing a deal with Golden Harvest.

Lo is credited with over 135 films as an actor, over 60 films as a director, over 30 films as a writer, and over 45 films as a producer.

== Personal life ==
Lo died of heart failure in Hong Kong on 20 January 1996.

== Filmography ==
=== Films ===
This is a partial list of films.

- Chun lei (1949)
- Chun cheng hua luo (1949)
- Da liang shan en chou ji (1949)
- Hai shi (1949) – Ku San
- Wang Kui yu Gui Ying (1952) – Wang Kuei
- Wu shan meng (1953) – Mingde
- Nie hai qing tian (1953) – Song Siqing
- Ge nu Gong Lingyan (1953)
- Ming nu ren bie zhuan (1953)
- Xiao feng xian (1953)
- Dang fu qing chi (1953) – Wen Lung
- Yuan yang jie (1953)
- Mei gui mei gui wo ai ni (1954)
- Bi xue huang hua (1954)
- Yang e (1955)
- Xiao bai cai (1955)
- Xiao feng xian xu ji (1955)
- Jin sang zi (1955)
- Cha hua nu (1955)
- Ying du yan ji (1955)
- Ju zi gu niang (1955)
- Tao hua jiang (1956) – Li Ming
- Hong chen (1956) – Hong Dalong
- Xue li hong (1956)
- Lian zhi huo (1956)
- Jing hun ji (1956) – Ma Churen
- Mang lian (1956) – Lung Meng-tang
- Shui xian (1956) – Kuang Yung-Li
- Wo xin chang dan (1956)
- Hu die fu ren (1956) – Wu Chiao
- Xian mu dan (1956)
- Duo qing he (1957) – Ah-Ching
- Jiu se cai qi (1957)
- Ai yu zui (1957) – Zhang Long
- Chun guang wu xian hao (1957)
- Ankoru watto monogatari utsukushiki aishu (1957) – King of Cambodia
- Diao Chan (1958) – Tung Chuo
- Xiao qing ren (1958)
- Shan hu (1958) – Chang Da Shun
- Hai wang zi (1958)
- Xiang ru fei fei (1958)
- Jin feng huang (1958)
- Long xiang feng wu (1959)
- Man tang hong (1959)
- Sha ren de qing shu (1959)
- Gui wu ge sheng (1959) – Kuan Li-Chi
- Jia you xi shi (1959) – Feng Gengtang
- Tao wang 48 xiao shi (1959)
- Ye hua xiang (1959) – Shang Ching Cheng
- Er nu ying xiong chuan (1959)
- Kuer liulang ji (1960)
- Gong lou dian ying (1960)
- Tao hua lei (1960) – Hua Mingchun
- Zhi fen jian die wang (1960)
- Hei hu die (1960)
- Mi yue feng bo (1960) – Chang Ying-Wei
- Ti yu huang hou (1961) – Guo Sue's Father
- Yuan nu Meng Li Si (1961)
- Wu yu wen can tian (1961) – Ho Ji-Ching
- Zei mei ren (1961)
- Shou qiang (1961)
- Zao sheng gui zi (1962)
- Yi duan qing (1962)
- Jin jian meng (1963)
- Wu Ze Tian (1963)
- He hua (1963)
- Die hai si zhuang shi (1963)
- Bao lian deng (1964) – Prime Minister Qin
- Luan feng he ming (1964) – Juying's Father
- Shen gong yuan (1964) – Dorgan
- Sheng si guan tou (1964)
- E yu he (1965)
- Nu hai qing chou (1965) – Master Ting
- Qi qi gan si dui (1965)
- Jin pu sa (1966)
- 1967 Angel With The Iron Fists – Chief Inspector. Also as director.
- 1967 Madame Slender Plum – Wang Xue Bin. Also as Director.
- 1967 Summons to Death – Gin Te-Biu. Also as screenwriter and director.
- 1967 Cui ming fu
- Jin shi qing (1968) – Liu Yi-Jen
- Nu xia hei hu die (1968) – Chief Gai Tian Lui
- Tie guan yin yong po bao zha dang (1968) – Professor Hsiung
- Duan hun gu (1968) – Chao Yun Yang
- Jurang bahaya (1968) – Mr. King
- Bayangan ajal (1968) – Mr. King
- Du long tan (1969)
- Hu dan (1969)
- Long men jin jian (1969) – Pai Chen-Tung
- Brothers Five (1970, Director)
- Gui tai jian (1971) – The King
- Ying zi shen bian (1971) – Chief Yang
- Gui liu xing (1971)
- The Big Boss (1971, Director)
- Vengeance of a Snow Girl (1971, Director) – Shen Dun
- Jin Xuan Feng (1972)
- Fist of Fury (1972) – Inspector
- The Black Tavern (1972)
- A Man Called Tiger (1973, Director) Also as Nakatami / Moriyuki.
- Ma lu xiao ying xiong (1973) – Tram passenger victim
- Hai yuan chi hao (1973) – Noodle shop boss
- Kung Fu Girl (1973, Director) – Commissioner Wu
- Yellow Faced Tiger (1974, Director)
- Naughty, Naughty (1974, Director)
- Chuo tou zhuang yuan (1974)
- Jin fen shen xian shou (1975)
- Shaolin Wooden Men (1976, Director, producer)
- New Fist of Fury (1976) – Inspector (cameo). Also as Director, screenwriter, and producer.
- The Killer Meteors (1976, Director)
- Snake & Crane Arts of Shaolin (1977, Producer)
- To Kill with Intrigue (1977, Director)
- Spiritual Kung Fu (1978, Director)
- Dragon Fist (1979, Director)
- Fearless Hyena Part II (1983, Writer)
- Long hu zhi duo xing (1988)
- Haam ging bin yuen (1988)
- Shen xing tai bao (1989)
- Life Is Cheap... But Toilet Paper Is Expensive (1989) – The Boss
- Gong woo jui hau yat goh dai lo (1990) – (final film role)
