= Tony Liu =

Hong Kong actor and martial artist

- Born: Liu Tian-jue; 7 February 1952 (age 74); Hong Kong
- Other names: Lau Wing; Liu Yung; Anthony Lau; Liu Wing; Liu Yun; Liu Yong; Tony Lau Wing; Tony Liu Tian-Jue; Tony Lau
- Occupation: Actor
- Years active: 1971–present
- Spouses: Tai Liang-chun (m. 1983; div. 1984) Eva Lai (m. 1992; div. 2004) Huang Li Yan (m. 2007; div. 2019)
- Children: 4
- Mother: Lai Man

Chinese name
- Traditional Chinese: 劉永
- Simplified Chinese: 刘永
Transcriptions
Standard Mandarin
- Hanyu Pinyin: Líu Yóng
Yue: Cantonese
- Jyutping: Lau4 Wing2

Tony Liu Tian-jue (born 7 February 1952) is a Hong Kong actor and martial artist. He is often credited by his Cantonese stage name Lau Wing. Liu is best known for starring in many Hong Kong martial arts films, especially in the 1970s and 1980s. He has also acted in some television series where he is better remembered for his roles as Qing Shi Huang and Genghis Khan.

== Early life ==
Liu was born in 1952 in British Hong Kong to Hong Kong actress Lai Man, and a sailor, Liu Tao. He was one of seven children born to the couple; he has five sisters and one brother. He grew up in Kowloon City and was playmates with members of the Seven Little Fortunes. As a child, he often visited film sets with his mother and was friends with Bruce Lee and Lam Ching-ying, with whom he practised kung fu. Liu was additionally a Hapkido, jujutsu, and Gōjū-ryū practitioner, attaining the rank of 3rd dan in the latter.

In elementary school, his mother enrolled him in several extracurricular activities and he would attend morning lessons at the Bishop Ford Memorial School and afternoon and evening English classes respectively at the St. Paul and Pui Ching English School.

Liu later attended Tang King Po School although he fared poorly in his studies, preferring to play various sports including basketball and soccer. He also took up jujutsu and karate during this time.

== Career ==
In 1970, Liu joined the Hong Kong film production company Golden Harvest. He made his movie debut in a villainous role in the 1971 film The Big Boss opposite Bruce Lee, whom he was reunited with by sheer coincidence having both been cast in the same movie despite having not seen each other since Lee's departure for the States in 1959. Liu went on to appear in three of the Lee's subsequent films – as a martial arts student in Fist of Fury (1972); in Way of the Dragon (1972) as Tony: a restaurant worker and karate practitioner; and in Enter the Dragon (1973) as Mr. Liu: Roper's first tournament opponent.

In 1973, Liu left Golden Harvest and two years later, joined the Shaw Brothers Studio and made his breakthrough as the Chien Lung Emperor in Emperor Chien Lung (1976) and its sequels. He continued acting in movies and various television series produced by ATV before relocating to Mainland China in the 2000s. In 2017, he returned to Hong Kong from Zhongshan to raise his sons. He currently remains active in the movie and television industry.

== Personal life ==
Liu was married to former Taiwanese actress Tai Liang Chun from 1983 to 1984. After the couple moved to Taiwan, Liu accused Tai of cheating on him and disfigured her face with knives and forks. He received a two-and-a-half-year sentence for the assault and was ordered to pay Tai 6 million TWD, but avoided serving any prison time by returning to Hong Kong. In 1992, he married Hong Kong actress and Miss Asia 1985, Eva Lai with whom he has two children, Wynce (born 1994) and Dicky (born 1998). Lai filed for separation at the Hong Kong High Court in 2000 due to domestic violence and finalized their divorce in 2004, whereupon Lai gained custody of their children. In 2007, Liu married Huang Li Yan, a woman from mainland China 30 years his junior. The couple lived in Shenzhen where they had two sons (born 2007 and 2011 respectively). The marriage ended in 2019 when Huang filed for divorce citing generation gap as the reason for the separation.

Liu was attacked in 1985 after leaving a nightclub and hospitalized for a month due to a broken sternum, ten cracked ribs, and a burst bone brow sustained from the incident.

== Awards ==
Award/Film Festival	Year	Nominated work	Category	Result	Ref.
Golden Horse Awards	1981	A Man of Immortality	Best Leading Actor	Nominated	
Golden Horse Awards	2011	Revenge: A Love Story	Best Supporting Actor	Nominated	

== Filmography ==
In film, Liu is credited as Lau Wing.

=== As actor ===
- Gui liu xing (1971)
- The Big Boss (1971) - Hsiao Chiun
- Fist of Fury (1972) - Chin
- The Way of the Dragon (1972) - Tony
- Back Alley Princess (1973)
- Enter the Dragon (1973) - Mr. Liu (Tournament Fighter) (uncredited)
- The Devil's Treasure (1973)
- Manchu Boxer (1974)
- Dynamite Brothers (1974)
- Naughty! Naughty! (1974)
- Desire (1974)
- Seven Coffins (1975)
- Money Is Everything (1975)
- Bar Girl (1975)
- Black Alice (1975)
- Emperor Chien Lung (1976)
- The Dragon Missile (1976)
- Brotherhood (1976)
- Tiger of Northland (1976)
- Shaolin Temple (1976)
- Adventures of Emperor Chien Lung (1977)
- The Naval Commandos (1977)
- Deadly Angels (1977)
- To Kill a Jaguar (1977)
- Death Promise (1977)
- Pursuit of Vengeance (1977)
- Clan of Amazons (1978)
- The Psychopath (1978)
- Legend of the Bat (1978)
- Swordsman and Enchantress (1978)
- The Voyage of Emperor Chien Lung (1978)
- The Brothers (1979)
- Invincible Enforcer (1979)
- The Convict Killer (1980)
- Emperor Chien Lung and the Beauty (1980)
- The Tiger and the Widow (1981)
- The Duel of the Century (1981)
- Return of the Sentimental Swordsman (1981)
- Notorious Eight (1981)
- Bloody Parrot (1981)
- The Bloody Mission (1982)
- Tiger Killer (1982)
- Passing Flickers (1982)
- Human Lanterns (1982)
- The Spirit of the Sword (1982)
- The Big Sting (1982)
- The Pure and the Evil (1982)
- The Emperor and the Minister (1982)
- The Enchantress (1983)
- Usurpers of Emperor's Power (1983)
- Bastard Swordsman (1983)
- Lady Assassin (1983)
- Empress Wu (1984) (TV series)
- Secret Service of the Imperial Court (1984)
- Return of Bastard Swordsman (1984)
- Sex Beyond the Grave (1984)
- Rise of the Great Wall (1986) (TV series)
- Genghis Khan (1987) (TV series)
- Poor Man's Orange (1987) (TV series)
- Bloodshed Over the Forbidden City (1990) (TV series)
- Dragon Killer (1995)
- How to Meet the Lucky Stars (1996)
- Baroness (2000)
- Visible Secret (2001)
- My Ma Has Son Fever (2004)
- The Valiant Ones New (2007)
- Wu Seng (2007)
- Legend of the Fist: Chen Zhen (2008)
- Taishan Kung Fu (2009)
- The Wrath of Vajra (2013)
- Mrs K (2016)
- Little Q (2019)
- The Lady Improper (2019)
- Sons of the Neon Night (2025)

=== As director ===
- Dragon Killer (1995)
- Baroness (2000)
