= Shih Szu =

Taiwanese actress

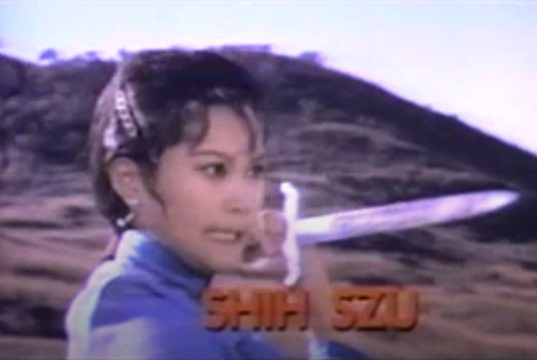
Shih Szu in the trailer for The Legend of the 7 Golden Vampires (screenshot)

Shih Szu (Chinese: 施思; pinyin: Shī Sī; born October 24, 1953) is a Taiwanese former actress. A ballet student from the age of six, she joined the Shaw Brothers Studio in 1969, at the age of sixteen, after secondary school and began appearing in films such as The Crimson Charm and The Rescue. However, the film that would rocket her to stardom would be her appearance opposite the famous Cheng Pei-pei in the 1971 film The Lady Hermit. She then would go on to appear in numerous wuxia and kung fu films such as The Thunderbolt Fist, Heroes of Sung, The Shadow Boxer, The Lady of the Law. The Shaw Brothers Studio, seeing great potential in her, gave her a role in Hammer and the Shaws’ co-production The Legend of the 7 Golden Vampires but the film was not successful internationally.

By the mid to late '70s, she was mostly relegated to supporting roles in films for such directors as Chang Cheh (Marco Polo, The Naval Commandos), Chor Yuen (Jade Tiger, Clan of Amazons) and Sun Chung (Avenging Eagle, The Deadly Breaking Sword). She also began to appear in films in Hong Kong and Taiwan outside of Shaw Brothers such as The Revenger and The Heroes. Her last film at the Shaw Brothers studio was A Deadly Secret (1980). Shih's last Hong Kong Film was The Murder, a 1983 Crime film directed by Lee Chiu. Shih returned to Taiwan and resumed her film career there, and subsequently retired from acting. Her last appearance was in a Taiwanese television series in 1987.

== Filmography ==
=== Films ===
This is a partial list of films

Year	Title	Original title	Role	Notes
1971	The Crimson Charm	血符門	Chiang Shang-ching	
1971	The Lady Hermit	鍾馗娘子	Tsui Ping	
1972	The Black Tavern	黑店	Zhang Caibing	
1972	The Young Avenger	小毒龍	Lee Bao Zhu	
1973	The Champion	豪客	Ah Chu	
1973	The House of 72 Tenants	七十二家房客	Student	
1973	The Villains	土匪	Lin Xiao Hong	
1974	The Legend of the 7 Golden Vampires	七金屍	Mai Kwei	
1976	Shaolin Temple	少林寺	Yen Yung-Chun	
1977	The Naval Commandos	海軍突擊隊	Cui Hsia	
1978	The Proud Youth	笑傲江湖	Bai Yingying	
1978	Clan of Amazons	陸小鳳之繡花大盜	Jiang Qingxia	
1978	The Avenging Eagle	冷血十三鷹	Siu Fung	
1979	The Deadly Breaking Sword	風流斷劍小小刀	Liu Yinxu	
1980	The Heroes	俠骨英雄傳	Princess	
1980	A Deadly Secret	連城訣	Ling Shuanghua	
1981	Kung Fu Emperor	功夫皇帝	Aunt Lan	
