= Thomas D. Tannenbaum =

American TV and film producer (1932–2001)

- Born: Thomas David Tannenbaum; February 4, 1932; Beverly Hills, California, U.S.
- Died: December 1, 2001 (aged 69); Woodland Hills, California, U.S.
- Occupation: Producer
- Years active: 1952–1996
- Spouse: Barbara Darrow (m. 1956; sep. 1970)
- Children: 3

Thomas David Tannenbaum (February 4, 1932–December 1, 2001) was an American producer. Tannenbaum was a producer for more than 40 years. In that time, Tannenbaum served as an executive at several film and television studios. They include Metro-Goldwyn-Mayer, David Wolper Productions, Paramount Television, Universal Television, and Columbia Pictures Television. He also had a several year association with producer David Gerber during the 1950s and '60s. Tannenbaum was also the first president of Viacom Productions. He served in that position from 1984 until 1991.

== Early life ==
Thomas David Tannenbaum was born on February 4, 1932, in Beverly Hills, California. He was the only son of David Tannenbaum and his wife Ruth (née Katzin). Tannenbaum's maternal grandparents, Morris Katzin and Flora Sherman, were both born in the former Russian Empire.. Morris immigrated to Newark, New Jersey, in 1892 and Flora immigrated to the United States with her family in 1890. His family was Jewish. His father was a lawyer who represented several actors in and around Beverly Hills and later became the mayor of Beverly Hills for two non-consecutive terms; 1952 and 1956. Tannenbaum had two older sisters; Susan "Sue" Graf and Carol Rapf, a prominent real estate agent in Malibu married to film and television producer and screenwriter, Matthew Rapf.

== Career ==
Tannenbaum, most noted for his television work, started out in film. He began working on staff for Metro-Goldwyn-Mayer in 1952. He worked on several films for the studio. His most noted film for the studio was Raintree County which starred Montgomery Clift and Elizabeth Taylor. In the late 1950s, Tannenbaum started working with famed producer David Gerber and his Famous Artists Agency television division. From there he went to Seven Arts Productions where he was the associate producer of the movie Rampage starring Robert Mitchum. He moved from Seven Arts to Wolper Productions where he stayed until 1969. In 1969, he took the offer of Stanley R. Jaffe of joining the staff of Paramount Television in New York City. He became vice president of sales for the studio. The studio sent Tannenbaum to Hollywood in 1970 where he was promoted to vice president in charge of production, succeeding Douglas S. Cramer. Tannenbaum supervised such series as Mannix, The Odd Couple, The Brady Bunch and Mission: Impossible.

Leaving from Paramount in 1971, Tannenbaum became senior vice president of Universal Television. Under Tannenbaum came several made-for-television movies including The Marcus-Nelson Murders, Sunshine and Lauren Bacall's first television special Applause. The television series Kojak and The Incredible Hulk were also supervised under Tannenbaum. He stayed there until 1977. In 1977, Tannenbaum became executive vice president of production for Columbia's television division. At Columbia, Tannenbaum oversaw the soap operas The Young and the Restless and Days of Our Lives. He also oversaw production of Fantasy Island. He left Columbia in 1980. He went back to MGM this time for its television subsidiary. While there, Tannenbaum developed and packaged five primetime series, including Fame and Chicago Story, as well as several made-for-television movies and attracted such talent as David Gerber, Valerie Harper’s TLC Productions and Fred Silverman, whom he would later bring into Viacom Productions. After leaving MGM, in 1980, Tannenbaum went to Centerpoint Productions where he stayed until 1982.

In 1984, Tannenbaum became the first president of the newly formed Viacom Productions. Tannenbaum brought together Fred Silverman and Dean Hargrove to produce the Perry Mason movies. The three were also responsible for Matlock, Jake and the Fatman and Father Dowling Mysteries. He served as president until 1991.

== Personal life and death ==
Tannenbaum married actress and model Barbara Darrow on September 28, 1956. They separated in 1970, yet remained married until his death. They had three children, Audrey, Eric, and Madelyn. Eric served as president of the Artists Television Group. Audrey married Bobby Darin and Sandra Dee's son, Dodd. Tannenbaum died on December 1, 2001, at the Motion Picture & Television Country House and Hospital at the age of 69. The cause was complications of heart and liver failure.

Business positions
Preceded by Douglas S. Cramer	Vice President in charge of production for Paramount Television; 1970-1971	Succeeded by Bruce Lansbury
