= Nora Miao =

Hong Kong actress (born 1952)

- 苗可秀
- Born: Chan Wing-man (陳詠憫); 8 February 1952 (age 74); British Hong Kong
- Education: St. Teresa's School Kowloon
- Occupations: Actress; radio presenter
- Years active: 1971–present
- Family: Ricky Chan (brother)

Chinese name
- Chinese: 苗可秀
Transcriptions
Standard Mandarin
- Hanyu Pinyin: Miáo Kěxiù
Yue: Cantonese
- Jyutping: miu^{4} ho^{2} sau^{3}

Birth name
- Traditional Chinese: 陳詠憫
- Simplified Chinese: 陈咏悯
Transcriptions
Standard Mandarin
- Hanyu Pinyin: Chén Yǒngmǐn
Yue: Cantonese
- Jyutping: can^{4} wing^{6} man^{5}

Nora Miao (Chinese: 苗可秀; Jyutping: miu4 ho2 sau3, born Chan Wing-man (陳詠憫); 8 February 1952) is a Hong Kong film actress. She is best known for appearing in many kung fu films in the 1970s, opposite Hong Kong action film stars such as Bruce Lee and Jackie Chan.

== Background ==
Chan Wing-man was born in British Hong Kong. She attended St. Teresa's School Kowloon. She was contracted to Golden Harvest, and spent her time making films in Hong Kong and in Taiwan, where she starred in several romance films.

Miao worked well with Ko Chun-hsiung and was paired with him in several movies. She played opposite both Bruce Lee and Jackie Chan. Miao appeared in all three of Bruce Lee's Hong Kong films, and became the only actress to share an on-screen kiss with Lee in Fist of Fury. She also starred opposite Jackie Chan in his first major film, New Fist of Fury.

She retired from acting in the late 1980s, and during the 1990s hosted an evening television show for the CFMT channel in Toronto, Ontario, Canada.

Miao currently lives in Toronto Canada, and hosts a radio program, Coffee Talk, on CCBC Radio.

== Filmography ==
Actress

- The Invincible Eight (天龍八將) (1971) - Chiang Yin
- The Blade Spares None (刀不留人) (1971) - Ho Li Chun
- The Comet Strikes (鬼流星) (1971)
- The Big Boss (唐山大兄) (1971) - Ice drinks hawker
- Story of Daisy (心蘭的故事) (1972)
- Fist of Fury (精武門) (1972) - Yuan Li Er
- The Way of the Dragon (猛龍過江) (1972) - Cheng Ching Hua
- The Hurricane (金旋風) (1972) - Ms Ting
- Tokyo-Seoul-Bangkok Drug Triangle (1973) - Parinda
- The Devil's Treasure (黑夜怪客) (1973) - Yen Yen
- Naughty! Naughty! (綽頭狀元) (1974) - Hsiao Yen
- The Skyhawk (黃飛鴻少林拳) (1974) - Hsiang Lan
- Money Is Everything (醒目雙星香港淘金記) (1975)
- The Changing Clouds (彩雲片片) (1975)
- Bruce's Deadly Fingers (龍門秘指) (1976) - Mina Lo
- New Fist of Fury (新精武門) (1976) - Mao Li Er / Miss Lee
- The Obsessed (靈魔) (1976)
- To Kill a Jaguar (絕不低頭) (1977) - Bobo Kam
- Clans of Intrigue (楚留香) (1977) - Kung Nan Yen
- Men of the Hour (風雲人物) (1977)
- The Kung Fu Kid (鐵拳小子) (1977)
- Snake and Crane Arts of Shaolin (蛇鶴八步) (1978) - Tang Ping-Er
- Showdown at the Equator (過江龍獨闖虎穴) (1978)
- The Dream Sword (夢中劍) (1979) - Tzu Yi Chun
- The Handcuff (手扣) (1979)
- Dragon Fist (龍拳) (1979) - Zhuang Meng Lan
- Mask of Vengeance (風流殘劍血無痕) (1980)
- Sakyamuni Buddha (釋迦牟尼) (1980)
- The Last Duel (英雄對英雄) (1981) - Shao Ye
- The Flower, the Killer (玉劍飄香) (1981)
- Beauty Escort (護花鈐) (1981) - Cold Blooded Mistress, Mei Win Shu
- My Blade, My Life (決鬥者的生命) (1982) - Zither Player
- Toronto Banana Gal (多倫多竹昇妹) (1990)
- How to Meet the Lucky Stars (運財五福星) (1996)
- Run Papa Run (一個好爸爸) (2008) - Auntie Ying
- Merry-Go-Round (東風破) (2010) - Eva
- Vulgaria (低俗喜劇) (2012) - Miss Cheung
- Never Too Late (2017)
- I'm Livin' It (麥路人) (2019) - Lai Fung

Cameo

- Bruce Lee : The Man and the Legend (李小龍的生與死) (1973)
- Bruce Lee: The Legend (李小龍傳奇) (1984)
- Bruce Lee: A Warrior's Journey (李小龍:勇士的旅程尼) (2000)
- Heart and Greed (溏心風暴3) (2017)
