= The Brothers (1972 film) =

1973 Hong Kong film by Chan Tung-man

The Brothers (a.k.a. The Kung Fu Brothers)
- Release date: 1972
- Countries: Hong Kong; Taiwan
- Language: Mandarin

The Brothers (Da di shuang ying in Mandarin), is a Kung Fu film which was also released in the United States under the title The Kung Fu Brothers.
