= The Black Tavern =

1972 Hong Kong film by Teddy Yip

- Theatrical poster
- 黑店
- Directed by: Teddy Yip
- Written by: Yeh I-fang
- Produced by: Run Run Shaw
- Starring: Shih Szu
- Cinematography: Yau Kei
- Edited by: Chiang Hsing-lung; Lee Yim-hoi
- Music by: Frankie Chan; Wu Dajiang
- Production company: Shaw Brothers Studio
- Distributed by: Shaw Brothers Studio
- Release date: 16 December 1972
- Running time: 83 minutes
- Country: Hong Kong
- Language: Mandarin

The Black Tavern (黑店) is a 1972 Hong Kong wuxia film directed by Teddy Yip and produced by the Shaw Brothers Studio, starring Shih Szu.

== Cast ==
- Shih Szu as Zhang Caiping
- Ku Feng as Zheng Shoushan
- Tung Li as Zha Xiaoyu
- Kong Ling as Jing Lü
- Kwok Chuk-hing as Jing Hong
- Barry Chan as Jing Hu
- Dean Shek as the wandering monk
- Yeung Chi-hing as Hai Gangfeng
- Wang Hsieh as Gao Sanfeng
- Yue Fung as Sanniang
- Situ Lin as Doggie
- Law Hon as the tavern cook
- Lee Ho as Liu Tong
- Wu Ma as the leader of the Xiangxi Five Ghosts
- Yau Ming as Three-headed Cobra
- Chiang Nan as a skilled robber
- Liu Wai as Hu
- Chan Chan-kong as Hu's partner
- Yeung Chak-lam as a robber
- Chu Gam as Tai'an
- Unicorn Chan as Three-headed Cobra
- Yuen Wah as Xiangxi Ghost
- Sa Au as a Xiangxi Ghost / constable
- Ho Kei-cheong as constable
- Mars as Official Hai's servant
- Jackie Chan as Official Hai's servant
- Ling Hon as the restaurant book keeper
- Yi Fung as a waiter
- Cheung Hei as a restaurant guest
- Wong Yuet-ting as a restaurant guest
- Gam Tin-chue as a restaurant guest

== Reception ==
Hayley Scanlon wrote: "[...] the incredibly fast-paced action sequences and the dark humour that accompanies them lend the film an epic quality despite its tight duration along with an ironic kind of cynicism that insists this world is simply too silly to be evil but that the scum of the martial arts world will pay all the same.
