= A Man Called Tiger =

1973 Hong Kong film by Lo Wei

- Theatrical poster
- Directed by: Lo Wei
- Written by: Lo Wei
- Produced by: Leonard Ho; Raymond Chow
- Starring: Jimmy Wang; Maria Yi
- Cinematography: Chris Chen Ching-Chu
- Edited by: Peter Cheung
- Music by: Joseph Koo
- Production companies: Paragon Films; Orange Sky Golden Harvest
- Release date: February 1973 (Hong Kong)
- Running time: 113 minutes
- Country: Hong Kong
- Language: Mandarin

A Man Called Tiger (Chinese: 冷面虎; Jyutping: Leng mian hu) is a 1973 Hong Kong martial arts action thriller starring Jimmy Wang and Maria Yi and directed by Lo Wei.

== Plot ==
Chin Fu (Jimmy Wang Yu)'s father was a kung-fu master who was murdered. Chin Fu shows up at a nightclub to revenge for his father's murder. Chin teams up with a sexy lounge singer Keiko (Maria Yi) and heads out to infiltrate the Japanese mafia.

== Cast ==
- Jimmy Wang Yu - Chin Fu
- Kawai Okada - Yoshida Ayako
- Kuro Mitsuo - Boss Shimizu Shobon
- Tien Feng - Boss Yamamoto
- James Tin Chuen - Liu Han-Ming
- Nakako Daisuke - Killer Yoshida Ryohei
- Kasahara Reiko - Shimizu' s secretary
- Han Ying-Chieh - Lin Mu-Lang
- Minakaze Yuko - Chang Li-Hua
- Maria Yi - Keiko, a lounge singer
- Lee Kwan - Siu Lee
- Lo Wei - Miyamoto
- Hsiao Yin-Fang - Kushi Ichiro / Nagatani Shoki
- Kam Shan - Yamamoto's thug Sonataro
- Chin Yuet-Sang - Shimizu's thug
- Lam Ching-Ying - Shimizu's thug
- Lee Tin-Ying - Shimizu's thug

== Review ==
Quentin Tarantino wrote "For most of the movie it looks like a Japanese Yakuza film, plays like an Italian gangster film, and has the fight every ten minutes pace of a Hong Kong chop socky pic, until suddenly, without any proper set up, we find ourselves into the beginning of the film’s extended climax."
