= List of Hong Kong films of 1977 =

This is a list of films produced in Hong Kong in 1977:

== Films ==
Title	Director	Cast	Genre	Notes
The 36 Crazy Fists	Chan Chi Hwa	Jackie Chan, Fung Hak On		
The Adventures of Emperor Chien Lung	Li Han Hsiang			
Along Comes a Tiger	Wu Ma	Don Wong Tao		
Arson - The Criminals, Part III	Hua Shan, Kuei Chih Hung			
Assassin	Larry Tu Chong Hsun			
Assault - The Criminals, Part IV	Kuei Chih Hung, Sun Chung			
At The Side of Sky-Line	Pai Ching Jui			
The Battle Wizard	Pao Hsueh Lieh			
Be Quick Darling	Wu Fung			
Below the Lion Rock	Allen Fong Yuk Ping, Ann Hui On Wah, Wong Sum			
The Big Boss Girl And CID	Wu Fung			
Black Belt Karate				
The Brave Archer	Chang Cheh		Martial arts	Shaw Brothers
Broken Oath	Jeong Chang-hwa	Angela Mao, Michael Chan, Bruce Leung, Kuo Cheng-Yu	Martial Arts	
Brotherly Love				
Bruce Lee, We Miss You	Lee Goon Cheung			
Bruce Lee's Ways Of Kung Fu	Godfrey Ho Chi Keung	Bruce Lai		
Bruce, Kung Fu Girls	Shut Dik			
The Call Girls	Ching Gong			
Carry On Bangkok	Luk Bong			
The Chase	David Chung			
Chinatown Kid	Chang Cheh			
Chinese Connection 2	Lee Tso Nam	Bruce Li, Lo Lieh		
The Chivalry, The Gunman And Killer	Hon Bo Cheung			
Chu Yuan	Bao Fang, Hui Sin			
CID - second season	Alex Cheung			
Clans of Intrigue	Chu Yuan			
The Clones of Bruce Lee	Joseph Kong Hung			
Cloud of Romance	Chan Hung			
The Clumsy Gambler	Luk Bong			
Clutch of Power	Cheung Paang			
Cobra Girl	Sun Chung			
Confessions of a Private Secretary	Steve Chan			
Confused Love	Patrick Tse Yin			
Crack Shadow Boxers	Wen Yao Hua			
The Criminal				
Deadly Angels	Pao Hsueh Lieh	Yen Nan-hsi, Shaw Yin-yin, Dana	Action	
Deadly Snail vs Kung Fu Killers	Heung Ling			
Death Challenge	Lung Fong			
Death Duel	Chu Yuan			
The Diary of Di-Di				
The Discharged	Stanley Siu Wing, Alan Tang Kong Wing			
Don't Kiss Me on the Street	Pai Ching Jui			
Dragon Lives Again	Law Kei	Bruce Liang, Hon Kwok Choi		
Dragon on the Shaolin Tower	Cheung Yan Git			
The Dragon, the Lizard, the Boxer				
The Dream of the Red Chamber	Li Han Hsiang			
Dreams of Eroticism	Siu Jeung Pin Diy Cho			
Duel in the Desert	Siu Muk			
Duel With the Devils				
Dynamite Shaolin Heroes	Godfrey Ho			
Dynasty	Cheung Mei Gwan			
Eagle's Claw	Lee Tso Nam			
Eight Masters	Joseph Kuo			
The End of Wicked Tiger	Law Kei			
Enter the Invincible Hero	Godfrey Ho	Dragon Lee, Casanova Wong		
Eternal Love				
Executioners from Shaolin	Lau Kar-leung	Chen Kuan-tai, Li-Li Li, Wong Yue	Kung fu film	
Fame of Chess	Ha Yue			
The Fatal Flying Guillotines	Raymond Lui			
Fight for Survival	Hau Chang			
A Fine Chilly Autumn				
Fists of Dragon				
Forever and Ever	John Law			
Four Iron Men	Kim Jeong Rong			
The Four Shaolin Challengers	Ngai Hoi			
Foxbat	Po-Chih Leong	Henry Silva, Vonetta McGee, Rik Van Nutter	Action, Drama	
The Gambler	Sun Chung, Aan Lik	Ga Lun, Meg Lam Kin-Ming, Tang Ching	Crime Drama	
The Glory Of The Sunset				
Golden Peacock Castle				
Golgo 13 Kowloon Assignment		Sonny Chiba, Alan Chui Chung-San		
The Great Man	Tam Bing Man			
Greatest Plot	Ulysses Au-Yeung Jun			
He Has Nothing But Kung Fu	Lau Kar Wing			
Hedgehog	Lee Hyeok Su			
Hero from Shanghai	Pao Hsueh Lieh			
Heroes of Shaolin	William Cheung Kei			
Heroes of the Eastern Skies	Cheung Chang Chak			
Hong Kong Emmanuelle	Man Wa			
Hot Blood	Richard Yeung Kuen			
ICAC	Ann Hui, David Lam, Yim Ho			
Imperial Sword	Chan Chi Hwa			
The Inheritor of Kung Fu	Chan Hung Lit	Lau Kar Wing, Shek Kin, Chan Hung Lit		
Innocent Lust	Ho Fan			
Instant Kung Fu Man	Richard Tung	John Liu, Hwang Jang-lee, Yip Fei Yang, Yuen Woo-ping, Alan Chui Chung-San		
Invincible Armour	Ng See Yuen			
Invincible Swordswoman	Chan Ming Wa			
The Iron Fisted Monk	Sammo Hung	Sammo Hung, James Tien, Lai Man	Martial Arts / Action	
Iron Monkey	Chen Kuan Tai			
Ironside 426	Lam Gwok Cheung			
It's Azalea's Time				
Jade Tiger	Chu Yuan			
Judgement of an Assassin	Sun Chung			
Killer From Above	Joe Law Chi			
Kung Fu Kid	Lo Wei			
Lady Constables	Cheung San Yee			
Lady Exterminator	Sun Chung			
The Lady Killer	Zhu Mu			
Lantern Festival Adventure	Cheung Pooi Saan			
Lantern Street	Larry Tu Chong Hsun			
Last Hurrah for Chivalry	John Woo			
Last Strike	Wa Yat Wang			
Legend of All Men Are Brothers	Tien Peng			
The Legend of The Purple Hairpin	Lee Tit			
Life and Death	Fu Qi			
Lost Swordship	Lee Ga			
Love Across the Bridge				
The Love Affair of Rainbow	Gao Shan Lan			
Love in the Shadow				
Love Stories	Yang Tao			
The Mighty Peking Man	Ho Meng-hua	Danny Lee, Evelyne Kraft, Hsiao Yao		
No Money No Talk	Ng Wui	Lo Hoi-Pang, Leung Tin, Bill Tung Biu	Drama	
Tiger Love		Hu Chin, Wang Ya, Lo Lieh	Martial arts	
To Kill with Intrigue	Lo Wei	Jackie Chan	Kung fu	
