= Jon T. Benn =

Businessman, actor, entrepreneur

Jon Toby Benn
- Born: Jon Toby Benn; July 30, 1935; New York City, United States
- Died: December 9, 2018 (aged 83); Louisville, Kentucky, United States
- Other name: Jon Benn
- Occupations: Businessman, entrepreneur, restaurateur, actor

Jon Toby Benn (30 July 1935 – 9 December 2018) was a businessman, entrepreneur, and actor, who most notably played the mob boss in Way of the Dragon. He was also an adventurer of sorts.

He wrote a book in reference to Bruce Lee, Remembering Bruce Lee, and subsequently opened a restaurant in Hong Kong, called "the Bruce Lee Cafe".

== Background ==
A businessman rather than an actor, Jon T. Benn was the oldest out of five children born to Louis and Florence Benn. He was a tall man, standing at 6.4 who had a liking for fine food, fine drink, fine clothes and pretty women. From his part in Bruce Lee's Way of the Dragon, he had become something of a cult hero. The Hong Kong entrepreneur would get recognition, not only in his country of residence but abroad as well. In many films, Benn has appeared as the cigar smoking Caucasian villain.

Benn began a six-shop franchise, the "World's Wurst Sandwich and Sausage". His association with Hong Kong began after having sold 24 gift shops in the United States and wanting to see where he had been buying his goods from, Benn went to Hong Kong in 1971.

Benn played the Mafia boss in Bruce Lee's film, Way of the Dragon which was released in 1973. His getting the part in the movie came about as a result of a cocktail party conversation with Hong Kong film producer Raymond Chow. At the time Benn didn't even know who Bruce Lee was. For his one week of work in the film, he was paid HK$2,000 (US$258). He became friends with Lee and Lee's family would come to his beach house on Lantau Island to go swimming.

== Personal life ==
Benn was married at least two times in his life. His first wife was Nancy. They were married in a small church in Carmel, California, July 1959. They kept quiet about the wedding so they could have a larger one some time later with friends and family invited. One of the guests who attended was actress Jayne Mansfield. Benn's marriage with Nancy lasted until 1966. His second wife was Shannon an Asian woman who was thirty years his junior. According to Benn, she was the greatest love of his life. They were married in 1995. Due to the fact that Benn didn't want children, they separated but remained good friends.

== Travel and adventures ==
Having studied Spanish in Mexico as a teenager, Benn later ran an English language program there. This was before the nationalization of the media.

== Film career ==
=== 1960s to 1980s ===
During the 1960s, Benn had either bit parts or double roles in The Magnificent Seven in 1960, John Huston's Night of the Iguana in 1964. These came about by chance and him happening to be in the right place at the right time. Benn appeared as "The Boss" in Way of the Dragon, Bruce Lee's 1972 film which Lee both wrote and directed. It was his role in the film that he got the attention that he is most remembered for. In 1980, the Joseph Kong directed Brucesploitation film, The Clones of Bruce Lee was released. Benn played the part of the mad scientist, Professor Lucas who is enlisted by the FBI to create clones of Bruce Lee.

=== 1990s to 2000s ===
Benn appeared as a banker in John Derek's 1990 film which starred Bo Derek, Ghosts Can't Do It.

In November 1997, Benn was guest of honor at the Brandon Lee Association sponsored convention in England which commemorated the 25th anniversary of Way of the Dragon. Pictures of Benn with Lee and Norris which were taken during the filming of Way of the Dragon appeared in a magazine which covered the silver anniversary event. It appeared that Benn had a popular than ever status as a cult celebrity. Benn was once offered $50 by a Japanese fan for his half smoked cigar. Around that time in the late 90s he was running his Bruce Lee café and sharing his experiences with Lee to patrons.

In 2006, the Ronny Yu directed Fearless which starred Jet Li was released. Benn played the part of the American businessman. Benn played a villain in Jakob Montrasio's The Way of the Spur which was released in 2012. Montrasio was thrilled when it was confirmed that Benn would be in the film. Also that year, The Man with the Iron Fists was released. The RZA directed film which starred Russell Crowe, Cung Le, Lucy Liu also featured Pam Grier. Benn played a plantation owner.

Benn's last film role was as the Big Boss in the Scott McQuaid directed sci-fi B film Space Ninjas that was released in 2019. The film starred Dirk Benedict. His last film was a documentary short, The Big Boss Remembered. Actor and filmmaker Michael Worth spent several days with Benn and his family in Kentucky for documentary on Bruceploitation. This short film came about as a result of Worth putting it together with an interview that Benn insisted on and Benn's brother Rick organizing the shoot. Benn who had been diagnosed with blood cancer and wasn't sure how long he had left to live and said that Worth should come out to see him as soon as possible. Benn and Worth had actually met 20 years prior to this. He died several weeks later.

== Filmography ==
Selective list
Title	Year	Role	Director	Notes/Ref.
The Magnificent Seven	1960	Horseman	John Sturges	Uncredited bit part
The Night of the Iguana	1964		John Huston	Extra
The Way of the Dragon	1972	The mob boss	Bruce Lee	
Foxbat	1977	Chief de la CIA	Po-Chih Leong	
Enter Three Dragons	1978		Joseph Kong	Bruceploitation film
The Clones of Bruce Lee	1980	Professor Lucas	Joseph Kong	Bruceploitation film
Challenge of the Tiger	1980	Head of the agency	Bruce Le	Uncredited, Bruceploitation film
The Unwritten Law	1985		Ng See-yuen	
Ghosts Can't Do It	1989	Banker	John Derek	Uncredited
Death by Misadventure: The Mysterious Life of Bruce Lee	1993	Himself	Toby Russell	Documentary
Bruce Lee: The Legend Lives On	1999	Himself	James Harker, Ray Santilli	TV movie, documentary
Century Hero	1999		Kai-Keung Sze	Documentary; Aka Bruce Lee: Century Hero aka Chin hei goeu lung
The Jon Benn Interview	2001	Himself /Thug's boss (segment Way of the Dragon)		Short; Phoenix Films production
Fearless	2006	The American Businessman	Ronny Yu	
Swat Chicks: Shanghai 2020	2009		Severin Bonnichon, Xu Li; Gianpaolo Lupori, Juan Vargas	Short
Bruce Lee: In Pursuit of the Dragon	2009	Himself	John Little	Documentary
East Wind Rain	2010	Priest	Yunlong Liu	
Goodbye Shanghai	2010	Mac Donald	Adam Christian Clark	Voice, Short
Kang: The New Legend Begins	2010	Mafia Boss	Richard Chung	Short
The Man with the Iron Fists	2012	Master John	RZA	As Jon Benn
The Way of the Spur	2012	Weilong	Jakob Montrasio	aka Shangdown: The Way of the Spur
Space Ninjas	2019	Big Boss	Scott McQuaid	(final film role)
Jon Benn – "The Big Boss Remembered"	2019	Himself	Michael Worth	

== Literature ==
- Remembering Bruce Lee: And Jon Benn's Other Adventures by Jon T. Benn - Blacksmith Books - ISBN 988161399X
- Impact August 1998 (Interviews with Benny Urquidez pt.2, Jon Benn etc.)
- Bruce Lee Review No. 6 (Special Appearance by Jon Benn)
