= Tiger Love =

Tiger Love may refer to:

- Tiger Love (1924 film), an American drama silent film
- Tiger Love (1977 film), a Hong Kong martial arts film
- Tiger Love (album), by Ray Simpson (1978)
- Tiger Love (musical group), an Israeli synth pop duo
