= The Dragon's Snake Fist =

The Dragon`s Snake Fist 血戰五形拳
- Film poster
- Directed by: Godfrey Ho; Kim Shi-hyeon
- Written by: Jang Cheon-ho; Kim Kyung-il
- Produced by: Joseph Lai San-lun; Kang Dae-jin; Tomas Tang
- Starring: Dragon Lee; Yuen Qiu; Kim Ki Joo; Choi Min Kyu; Jang Il Do
- Cinematography: Shin Myung-yue
- Edited by: Kim Chang-sun
- Music by: Jeon Jeong-geun
- Production company: Asso Asia Films
- Distributed by: IFD Films & Arts Ltd.
- Release date: January 1, 1981 (South Korea)
- Running time: 83 minutes
- Countries: Hong Kong; South Korea
- Language: Korean

The Dragon's Snake Fist (also known as Disciple of Yong-mun Depraved Monk or Dragon Force) is a 1981 Korean and Hong Kong martial arts film directed by Godfrey Ho and starring Dragon Lee.

== Plot ==
Two fighters, Chu Man King and Master Wai, who are from different kung fu styles (Snake fist and Crane fist) meet for a duel secretly. The loser must leave the town and allow the winner to his art in peace. Chu Man King wins; Master Wai is upset and plans revenge. Several years after the duel, Chu Man King decides to send his students across the land to spread his Snake fist art.

Along the way one of Chu Man King's best students, Dragon Wu, is attacked by Wai's son and his gang from the Crane fist school. When they figure out that Wu was from the Snake fist school they decide to teach him a lesson. However, they let him go when his sister reminds him that if their father (Master Wai) found out what happened he would not be pleased. Wu continues his journey for his village for his new Snake fist school and to marry his arranged bride. This do not go smoothly since the students from the Crane fist school interrupt Wu's plan, however Wu still done his job done. Meanwhile, old Master Wai is still bitter over his defeat all those years ago and one of his legs is completely useless. He kept this as a secret from his son and daughter.

However Wai's son wants to know the truth and he decides to send a fake birthday invitation to Master Chu so he can have a duel with him. When Master Wai finds out about his son's actions, he is furious and tells him to stop it. Wai's son pays no attention to his father's advice and decides to take revenge on Master Chu and destroy the Snake fist school. Even worse, Wai's son kidnaps Wu's wife and Wu decides to destroy the Crane fist school.

== Cast ==
- Dragon Lee as Dragon Wu
- Yuen Qiu as Master Wai's daughter (as Phoenix Kim)
- Jang Il Do as Invincible Tiger
- Kim Young Suk as Master Wai's son
- Choi Min Kyu as Master Wai
- Kim Ki Joo as Master Chu Man King
- Han Tae Il as Master Wai's Samurai Disciple
- Lee Ye Min as Jen's Father
- Seo Jeong-Ah as Jen (Wu's arranged wife)
- Choe Hyeong Gun as Master Wai's Spy
- Michael Han as Master Wai's Fire Breather Thug (as Han Sang Gwan)
- Kim Ki Beom as Mr.Lau (Master Wai's assistant)
- Kim Ki Hong as Master Wai's Disciple
- Moon Jeong Kum as Master Chu's Disciple
- Won Jin as Master Chu's Blackbelt Disciple (extra)
- Choe Soon Seok as Master Chu's Blackbelt Disciple (extra)
- Jeong Joo Hyeon (extra)
- Oh Jae Seong (extra)
- Park Gwan Yeong (extra)

== Media release ==
The movie was initially released on VHS by IFD Films and Arts, and later it was released in Hong Kong on VCD with rare Mandarin dubbed version. Around 2000, the film appeared on DVD, although this release consisted of a direct transfer from a VHS source.

In 2009, Rarescope, a company known for releasing numerous Kung Fu movies on DVD, attempted to release the movie with the remastered version; however the official release of the DVD has been canceled. The unreleased remastered version subsequently appeared on YouTube, but it was later removed due to copyright restrictions.

In 2015, the British company Terracotta Distribution — known for releasing remastered editions of Shanghai 13, Hero of Shaolin and others — officially released the film on DVD in the PAL region. This edition was fully remastered and featured digital stereo sound, along with the original trailer.
