= Stuart Smith =

Stuart Smith may refer to:

- Stuart Lyon Smith (1938–2020), politician, leader of the Ontario Liberal Party (1976–1982), psychiatrist, academic and public servant in Ontario, Canada
- Stuart Saunders Smith (born 1948), American composer and percussionist
- Stuart Tyson Smith (born 1960), American Egyptologist
- Stuart Smith (actor) (born 1954), British-Australian actor
- Stuart Smith (game designer), American computer game designer
- Stuart Ernest Smith (1915–2007), ice hockey player for the Montreal Canadiens
- Stuart Smith (ice hockey) (born 1960), ice hockey player for the Hartford Whalers
- Stuart Smith (musician) (born 1956), British rock-blues guitarist and songwriter
- Stuart H. Smith (born 1960), American plaintiff attorney
- Stuart Smith (general) (born 1963), Australian Army general
- Stuart Smith (politician) (born 1963), New Zealand politician
- Stuart Smith (cricketer) (1868–?), Irish cricketer
- Syko Stu, born Stuart Smith, American wrestler

== See also ==
- Steuart Smith (born 1952), guitarist with the Eagles
- Stewart Smith (disambiguation)
