= Strike of Thunderkick Tiger =

- Hangul: 내 이름 쌍다리
- RR: Nae ireum ssangdari
- MR: Nae irŭm ssangdari
- Directed by: Park Woo Sang
- Starring: Casanova Wong; Charles Han
- Distributed by: An Asso Asia Film
- Release date: February 14, 1982
- Running time: 85 minutes
- Language: Korean

Strike of Thunderkick Tiger is 1982 Action drama film starring Casanova Wong and Charles Han. The film was filmed around 1978 but it had cancellation however it was officially released in 1982. It is also known as My Name Is Twin Bridges and Hong Kong Connection as an alternate title for DVD release.

== Plot ==
The three miners from Hong Kong Wong, Monkey and Snake stole the evacuation gold that just arrived. However Wong decided to run off and take all the gold along with the hooker Sorin but Wong also betrays Sorin and take his niece to his home country. Wong is later attacked and killed by the Snake's gang. Wong first gives his niece a Rubic cube where there is evidence for the spot where all the gold is hidden. Snake's gang is about to take it from her, but Thunderkick (who was sent by Monkey) takes it first. Thunderkick wants to know about the secret of the Rubic cube. Monkey's gang attacks and kidnaps him but he safely escapes with the help of Sorin. However, Thunderkick betrays Sorin. Later Monkey and Snake realized that the Rubic cube was not the one with the evidence and Thunderkick is chased by the both Monkey and Snake's group. Eventually Thunderkick defeats both Monkey and Snake's gang and took all the gold but he is killed by the Sorin at the end.

== Cast ==
- Charles Han as Thunderkick
- Casanova Wong as Monkey
- Han Kook Il as Snake
- Han Jee Ha as hooker Sorin
- Peggy Min
- Lisa Lee
- Billy Yuen as thug
- Alfred Ma as Monkey's assistant
- Chan Taiyun (extra, uncredited)
- Dragon Lee (cameo)
- Phillip Leung (extra, uncredited)
- David Kao (extra, uncredited)
