= The Dragon, the Hero =

1979 Hong Kong film by Godfrey Ho

The Dragon, The Hero
- Film poster
- Traditional Chinese: 雜家高手
- Directed by: Godfrey Ho
- Written by: On Szeto
- Produced by: Joseph Lai; Tomas Tang
- Starring: Philip Ko; Tino Wong Cheung; Liu Chung-Liang
- Cinematography: Yau Kei
- Edited by: Vincent Leung
- Music by: Chen Zhong; Ma Man
- Production company: Asso Asia Films
- Distributed by: New Film
- Release date: 1979
- Running time: 93 minutes
- Countries: Hong Kong; Taiwan
- Language: Mandarin Chinese

The Dragon, The Hero is a 1979 Hong Kong martial arts film directed by Godfrey Ho and starring Philip Ko, Dragon Lee, Tino Wong Cheung and Liu Chung-Liang. The movie is considered one of the best martial arts films that Godfrey Ho directed by people outside of the martial arts movie fanbase. The movie is also known as Dragon on Fire.

== Plot ==
Tu Wu Shen and Tang are direct descendants of Strike Rock Fist master who began as best friends however ended up being worst enemies. The revenge continues throughout their lives until the two warriors discover that they have a common enemy, Ma Ti, a perverse master of dangerous Su Ta. Tu Wu Shen and Tang must forget about the past and reunite to fight against the evil menace.

== Cast ==
- John Liu as Tu Wu Shen
- Tino Wong Cheung as Tang
- Philip Ko as Ma Ti
- Dragon Lee as Ah Tien
- Chiang Kam as Fat dish washer
- David Wu as Thin Dish Washer
- Alexander as Gwailo at market
- Chan Lau as old groper
- Bolo Yeung as King Kong (Cameo)
- Mars as thug (uncredited)
- Wong Chi Ming extra, action director
- Lee Ting Ying
- Lee Hang

== Alternate title confusion ==
While originally the film was released as under the name of The Dragon, the Hero, it has been released sometimes as The Dragon on Fire, which was also an alternate title of Enter Three Dragons (a Dragon Lee movie released in 1978.).

== Media release ==
The movie was released on DVD by the company Hong Kong Connection and released on VHS under the name Muscle of the Dragon and also Dragon on Fire. The movie was also released on the remastered German DVD with original Mandarin dubbed version. In 2024, Severin Films released the movie as part of its The Game of Clones box set.
