= Golden Dragon =

A Golden Dragon is a popular motif that is mostly associated with Chinese culture, but can also be found in Western cultures, it can refer to several items:

- Asian arowana, also known as the golden dragon fish
- Der goldene Drache, an opera by Péter Eötvös
- Domain of the Golden Dragon, an unofficial United States Navy certificate given for crossing of the 180th Meridian (International Date Line)
- Golden Dragon (company), a China-based manufacturer of buses and light vans
- Golden Dragon F.C., a football club in Sierra Leone
- Golden Dragon massacre, a crime at a restaurant called "Golden Dragon" in San Francisco
- Golden Dragon Restaurant (San Francisco)
- Golden Dragon, Silver Snake, a kung-fu film
- Gold dragon (Dungeons & Dragons), a monster in the game Dungeons & Dragons
- Gulden Draak, a Dutch ale
- King Long, a China-based manufacturer of buses and light vans, known as Jīnlóng Kèchē (金龙客车) lit. “Golden Dragon Bus” in Chinese
- Higer Bus, also known as Sūzhōu Jīnlóng (苏州金龙) in Chinese
- Dave Morris (writer)#Golden Dragon series
- Nanjing Golden Dragon Bus - Nanjing, China based manufacturer of buses and light vans
