= Karalexis =

Karalexis is a surname. Notable people with the surname include:

- Alex Karalexis (born 1977), American mixed martial artist
- Serafim Karalexis (fl. 1967), American film producer
