= Ninja Terminator =

1985 film directed by Godfrey Ho

- Film poster

Chinese name
- Traditional Chinese: 奪寶狂龍
- Simplified Chinese: 夺宝狂龙
- Literal meaning: Treasure hunter
Transcriptions
Standard Mandarin
- Hanyu Pinyin: Duó bǎo kuáng lóng
Yue: Cantonese
- Jyutping: Dyut^{6} bou^{2} kong^{4} lung^{4}
- Directed by: Godfrey Ho; Kim Shi-hyeon (reused footage)
- Screenplay by: Godfrey Ho
- Story by: AAV Creative Unit; Warren See
- Produced by: Godfrey Ho; Joseph Lai; Betty Chan
- Starring: Richard Harrison; Hwang Jang-lee; Phillip Ko; Im Ja-ho; Jonathan Wattis
- Cinematography: Raymond Cheung Hoi
- Edited by: Norton Wong
- Production companies: IFD Films and Arts
- Distributed by: IFD Films and Arts
- Release date: 1985
- Running time: 92 minutes
- Country: Hong Kong
- Language: English

Ninja Terminator (Chinese: 奪寶狂龍; lit. 'Treasure hunter') is a 1985 English-language Hong Kong martial arts film produced and distributed by IFD Films and Arts. It was part of a series of "cut-and-paste" martial arts films by that company, in which scenes were filmed with Caucasian actors, that were then added to pre-existing films, re-cutting it together and dubbing over the actors with his own dialogue in order to create a new story.

Ninja Terminator reuses more than 50 percent of its footage from the South Korean film The Uninvited Guest of the Star Ferry (Korean: 스타페리 불청객; 1984), directed by Kim Shi-hyeon and starring Hwang Jang-lee and Im Ja-ho (credited as 'Jack Lam'). The new footage, directed by Godfrey Ho and starring American actor Richard Harrison, introduced a storyline about ninjas hunting for pieces of a magical statue.

== Plot ==
A villainous Ninja Empire is celebrating its twentieth anniversary of rulership. The leader, the Supreme Ninja, celebrates by having his three greatest warriors - Ninja Masters Harry, Towne, and Tamashi - bring him the three pieces of a gold bust known as the Golden Ninja Warrior. When the three pieces - two separated arms, each holding a small sword, and a head/torso - are united, it makes the owner impervious to harm from blades. Believing the Empire is in need of reform and that the Supreme Ninja is too dangerous to possess such power, the three Ninja Masters steal and separate the pieces of the Golden Ninja Warrior.

The Ninja Empire seeks out these rogue ninjas in order to retrieve the missing pieces of the shrine. Two years after the theft of the statue, the warrior Karada kills the rogue ninja Tamashi, retrieving the body of the Golden Ninja Warrior for the Empire and bringing it to his trusted warrior Yamato. Towne, now a crime lord, tells his lieutenant Tiger Chan to see if Tamashi entrusted the statue's body to his brother Ikaza or his sister Michiko. Unable to find it, Tiger's agents kill Ikaza. The glib warrior Jaguar Wong learns of this and informs his employer, Harry. On Harry's advice, Jaguar leaves to protect Michiko from Tiger Chan, defeating several agents. When he attempts to warn her about the danger of the Golden Ninja Warrior, she doesn't know what she's talking about and mistakes his questions for threats. The Supreme Ninja's warrior Yamato dons a red ninja uniform and attacks Harry with one of Towne's throwing stars, then attacks Towne with one of Harry's throwing stars. Harry and Towne suspect that each other has decided to unite the Golden Ninja Warrior and attain its power.

Jaguar Wong reunites with his former lover Lily. After spending the night together, Lilly explains that they cannot see each other again because she is now romantically involved with Tiger's right-hand man Victor Lee. Meanwhile, Harry and Towne, each the other has already tried to assassinate them. After each shows the throwing star used against them, Harry concludes that Yamato is the true culprit, as he had access to throwing stars they used when they all still worked for the Ninja Empire. Harry suggests that the Supreme Ninja's warrior Yamato killed Tamashi and then tried to trick him and Towne into killing each other by planting the stars. He suggests he and Towne work together rather than against each other.

Yamato sends a tiny robot to deliver a threat to Harry, then calls him on the phone to make sure he got it, telling him he has three days to return his piece of the Golden Ninja Warrior. Towne is also threatened by a toy robot from the Empire. Despite Towne and Harry now having an uneasy alliance, Tiger Chan has his righthand man Victor Lee kidnap Michiko in hopes she will lead them to the Golden Dragon Warrior's body. In retaliation, Jaguar kidnaps Lily and offers to make a hostage trade with Victor. During the trade, he realizes the "Michiko" present is an impostor and is told the real woman is tied up to a remote control time bomb. Jaguar is barely able to find and save Michiko in time. Meanwhile, Towne is sent a video tape from Yamato, who again demands the return of all pieces of the Golden Ninja Warrior and that Towne commit suicide to restore his honor. Otherwise, Yamato threatens to kill Towne, saying, "And I am a Ninja Terminator."

Once Michiko is safe, Jaguar Wong fights Tiger Chan and finally defeats him. Towne and Harry bring their pieces of the statue to a meeting place where Yamato arrives with the statue's body. Harry and Towne then take turns attacking Yamato. Towne is killed but Harry then has Yamato at his mercy. Despite Yamato's pleas that this defeat means he cannot return to the Empire and he would rather die an honorable death, Harry ignores him and unites the pieces of the statue. As Harry achieves its power, Yamato seems to blow himself up through force of will.

== Cast ==
- Richard Harrison as Harry
- Phillip Ko as Yamato
- Jonathan Wattis as Towne
- Maria Francesca Harrison as Harry's wife
- Chiang Tao as the Supreme Ninja
- Suen Kwok-ming

Uninvited Guest of the Star Ferry footage

- Hwang Jang-lee as Tiger Chan
- Im Ja-ho as Jaguar Wong
- Seo Jong-ah as Michiko
- Yoon Yang-ha
- Baek Hwang-gi
- Park Hui-jin
- Hwang Choon-soo
- Kim Doo-han
- Lee Je-gyu
- Yoo Chang-guk
- Park Kwang-yeon
- Jeong Bong-yeon

== Reception ==
In '80s Action Movies on the Cheap, author Daniel R. Budnik wrote that the film "has a straightforward plot that goes off on a dozen loopy tangents". Jim Vorel of Paste included it in the magazine's list of "The 100 Best Martial Arts Movies of All Time" at #100, calling the film hilarious despite its incoherence and ineptitude. Total Film similarly included it in a list of "8 Awesomely Stupid Movie Fight Scenes", praising the film for its nonsensical fight scenes.

== In popular culture ==
An episode of the popular podcast How Did This Get Made? released on June 23, 2017, features Ninja Terminator. They ridiculed several aspects of the film, such as the protagonist's usage of a Garfield phone.

The film was satirized in the parody web series Ninja the Mission Force.
