= The Clones of Bruce Lee =

1980 Hong Kong film by Joseph Kong and Nam Gi-nam

The Clones of Bruce Lee 神威三猛龍
- Film poster
- Directed by: Joseph Kong; Nam Gi-nam
- Written by: Wu Kuang-Hsin
- Produced by: Cheung Chung-Lung; Han Sang-Hoon; Dick Randall
- Starring: Dragon Lee; Bruce Le; Bruce Lai; Bruce Thai; Bolo Yeung; Jon T. Benn; Chiang Tao
- Cinematography: Yim Jin-hwan
- Music by: Lee Cheol-hyeok
- Production companies: Dae Yang Films Co., Ltd; Film Line Enterprises; Filmark International Ltd.
- Distributed by: Newport Releasing (U.S.); Ambassador Film Distributors (Canada)
- Release dates: 14 August 1980 (Netherlands); 23 May 1981 (South Korea)
- Running time: 91 minutes
- Countries: Hong Kong; Philippines; Thailand
- Language: Cantonese

The Clones of Bruce Lee (Chinese: 神威三猛龍; lit. 'Godly Powerful Three Furious Dragons'; Korean: 사형삼걸; Hanja: 蛇形三傑; lit. 'Snake Shaped Three Elites'; Taiwanese: 複製人李小龍：三龍怒火; also known in English as Death Penalty on Three Robots) is a 1980 Bruceploitation martial arts film capitalizing on the death of actor and martial arts star Bruce Lee in 1973.

The film gathers together several of the many Lee imitators who sprang up after the icon's death (including Dragon Lee, Bruce Le and Bruce Lai), alongside performers from the real Lee's films and other veterans of the Hong Kong movie industry. It has been called "The Mount Rushmore of Bruceploitation films".

== Synopsis ==
On July 20, 1973 (immediately after the death of Bruce Lee in Hong Kong), Colonel Colin of the Special Branch of Investigations asks Professor Lucas, a brilliant scientist, to take samples of the late master's brain tissue. Using these samples, Lucas creates three perfect clones of Lee: Bruce Lee #1, Bruce Lee #2, and Bruce Lee #3. They are trained in martial arts by Bolo Yeung and Chiang Tao. The mission of the clones is to fight crime in Southeast Asia.

Bruce Lee #1 goes undercover as an actor for a corrupt, gold-smuggling producer who plans to have him die on camera. Meanwhile, the other two clones go to Thailand where they meet up with Chuck Lee Sing, a local SBI agent who is not a clone but who also resembles Bruce Lee. They have been assigned to kill Dr. Ngai, a mad scientist who is plotting to take over the world with his army of bronze automatons: men whose skin turns to metal when they are injected with Ngai's special formula.

The clones successfully complete their missions and return to Hong Kong. But Professor Lucas, disgruntled because he feels he was not properly rewarded by the SBI for creating the clones, pits them against one another. The professor's female assistants stop the three clones from fighting amongst themselves, and Lucas sends out a small army of men to dispatch the clones. By the end of the film, Bruce Lee #3 has been killed—but so have all of Professor Lucas's henchmen (including the two kung-fu instructors, both defeated by Bruce Lee 1). Bruce Lee #2 finishes off Lucas's personal bodyguard and the professor is arrested.

== Cast ==
- Dragon Lee as Bruce Lee 1
- Bruce Le as Bruce Lee 2
- Bruce Lai as Bruce Lee 3
- Jon T. Benn as Professor Lucas
- Andy Hannah as Colonel Colin
- Bruce Thai as Chuck Lee Sing
- Bolo Yeung
- Chiang Tao

== Reaction ==
On the website Kung Fu Cinema, Mark Pollard sums up much of the appeal of the film, writing:

"Clones of Bruce Lee is the Plan 9 from Outer Space of Hong Kong cinema. It's the very definition of bad filmmaking and sleazy exploitation. Expect to witness mad scientists bent on world domination, death rays, bronzemen, and naked women frolicking on the beach. Despite some decent kung fu action, particularly with Bolo, it's so bad you'll laugh or turn it off."

A review on the website The Bad Movie Report finds it less enjoyable:

"Although the Lee-alikes are in superb shape, and certainly know their Lee chops, there is a deadening sameness about the fight scenes that eventually robs the movie of all joy; this flick is, after all, 95% fight scenes. I've always preferred the swordplay-oriented kung fu movies- the more weapons, and the more bizarre, the better. Let's face it, the numerous styles notwithstanding (and there are several on display), there are only so many ways to aim a blow at your opponent and only so many ways to block that blow. Without a good fight coordinator, like Lee himself, Jimmy Wang Yu, Samo Hung or a host of others, after forty-five minutes of the same fight over and over, each subsequent fight becomes the kinetic equivalent of white noise: your mind more or less goes on vacation."

== Production notes ==
The Clones of Bruce Lee contains the only fight scene between Bruce Le and Dragon Lee.

Jon T. Benn, who plays Professor Lucas and is familiar to Bruce Lee fans as the mob boss from Way of the Dragon, later appeared as an American businessman in Jet Li's film Fearless.

This film is one of several appearances in the Bruceploitation subgenre for Bolo Yeung, who won fame for his portrayal of the muscular villain Bolo in Bruce Lee's Enter The Dragon.

Godfrey Ho was an assistant director on the film.
