= Bruce Lai =

Korean martial artist and actor (1950–2014)

Bruce Lai, real name Chang Il-do (1950–2014), was a Korean martial artist and actor active in Hong Kong who starred in many Godfrey Ho films.

Also known as Chang Yi-tao, he earned a ninth-degree black belt in Tang Soo Do.

He died in 2014 of cancer, aged 64.

== Filmography ==
- Snow Plum Blossom (1976)
- Stranger from Shaolin (1976)
- Bruce Lee's Ways of Kung Fu (1977)
- Mantis Combat (1978)
- The Divine Martial Arts of Dharma (1978)
- Enter Three Dragons (1978)
- Blooded Treasure Fight (1979)
- Golden Dragon, Silver Snake (1980)
- The Great Conspiracy (1980)
- The Young Master (1980)
- Return to the 36th Chamber (1980)
- The Clones of Bruce Lee (1980)
- The Heroic One (1981)
- The Dragon's Snake Fist (1981)
- The Kung Fu Emperor (1981)
- Hero at the Border Region (1981)
- Fury in Shaolin Temple (1981)
- Postman Strikes Back (1982)
- Challenge of the Lady Ninja (1983)
- Shaolin Vs. Lama (1983)
- The Super Ninja (1984)
- Crocodile Hero (1985)
- Chinese Evil Technique (1986)
- The Young Taoism Fighter (1986)
- Woman in the Forest Story (1987)
- The Falcon (1989)
- The Other Kind of Penalty (1989)
- Fighter of Death (1989)
- Braveful Police (1990)

== See also ==
- Bruceploitation
