= Silver Snake =

Silver Snake may refer to

- Silver snake (Leptotyphlops albifrons), a snake species of South America
- the silver Eastern subspecies of the common garter snake, Thamnophis sirtalis sirtalis
- Elaith Craulnober, a fictional character often likened to a "silver snake" because of his appearance
- Golden Dragon, Silver Snake, 1979 martial arts film directed by Godfrey Ho
- The Case of the Silver Snake, 1988 film starring Jia Hongsheng
- Silver Snakes, band affiliated with the Bridge 9 Records label
- Silver Snakes, name of a Star Legion within the Star Fleet (game series)
- Silver Snakes, team designation within the Legends of the Hidden Temple children's game show

== See also ==
- List of snake genera
