= Stewart Smith =

Stewart Smith may refer to:

- Stewart Smith (politician) (1907–1993), leading member of the Communist Party of Canada
- Stewart Henry Smith (1855–1896), Scottish rugby union player
- J. Stewart Smith (1913–2008), New Zealand man who introduced invasive fish into the country's freshwater ecosystems
- Stewart Smith, former member of the band Delirious?

== See also ==
- Steuart Smith (born 1952), musician
- Stuart Smith (disambiguation)
