= Dragon Lee (actor) =

South Korean-Hong Kong actor and martial artist (born 1958)

- Born: Moon Kyoung-seok; August 12, 1958 (age 68); Seosan, Chungcheongnam-do, South Korea

Korean name
- Hangul: 문경석
- Hanja: 文鏡錫
- RR: Mun Gyeongseok
- MR: Mun Kyŏngsŏk

Nickname in South Korea
- Hangul: 거룡
- Hanja: 巨龍
- RR: Georyong
- MR: Kŏryong

Dragon Lee, (born August 12, 1958) originally known in South Korea as Keo Ryong (거룡, literally "Giant Dragon") and born Moon Kyoung-seok, is an actor and practitioner of taekwondo and hapkido. He made a name for himself as a martial arts film star in the 1970s and 80s.

== Early life ==
Dragon Lee was born Moon Kyung-seok in Seosan, Chungcheongnam-do Province. He said in the 2023 Bruceploitation documentary "Enter the Clones of Bruce" that as a child, he loved watching martial arts films, especially those starring Bruce Lee. He said he would often imitate the moves he saw in such movies and that the films inspired him to try his hand at acting in the genre.

== Career ==
Lee studied taekwondo with friend and actor Kim Tai-chung, who was Bruce Lee's double in the final scenes of Game of Death. It was at this stage of his life that Lee also began studying the Korean martial art of hapkido under Hwang In-shik, who appeared with Bruce Lee in The Way of the Dragon.

When Lee was at a theater, a man told him that he resembled Bruce Lee, a big compliment because the latter was popular at the time. The man knew film directors in Hong Kong and helped Lee advance his career.

In his early 20s, Lee moved to Hong Kong and starred in many martial arts films, often credited as Bruce Lei because of his resemblance to Bruce Lee. Among his many film credits is the semi-documentary The Real Bruce Lee (1977). He also appeared in the 2023 documentary Enter the Clones of Bruce about the Bruceploitation craze.

== Later life ==
Lee moved back to Seoul and is now a television actor and producer. He also heads a national actors' association.

== Partial filmography ==
- Enter the Clones of Bruce (2023) - Himself
- I'm Not Bruce (2015)
- King's Women (2000)
- Emperor of the Underworld (1994)
- The Nationwide Constituency (1991)
- The Nationwide Constituency 2 (1994)
- Crime Stopper (1990)
- Ninja Champion (1986)
- Martial Monks of Shaolin Temple (1983)
- Dragon Claws (1982)
- Secret Ninja, Roaring Tiger (1982)
- The Dragon's Snake Fist (1981)
- Dragon Lee Fights Back (1981)
- Strike of Thunderkick Tiger (1981)
- Enter the Invincible Hero (1981)
- The Dragon's Showdown (1980)
- Champ Against Champ (1980)
- Mission For the Dragon (1980)
- The Clones of Bruce Lee (1981)
- Golden Dragon, Silver Snake (1980)
- Fist of Fury '81 (1979)
- Kung Fu Fever (1979)
- The Dragon, the Hero (1979)
- Fist of Dragon (1978)
- Enter the Deadly Dragon (1978)
- Enter Three Dragons (1978)
- Dragon Lee vs. The Five Brothers (1978)
- The 18 Amazones (1977)
- The Real Bruce Lee (1977)
- The Magnificent Duo (1976)
- Wild Dragon Lady (1976)
- Superfist (1975)

=== As producer ===
- Two Man (1995)

=== Documentary ===
- Amazing Masters (2000)
