= The Real Bruce Lee =

1979 South Korean-Hong Kong documentary by Jim Markovic

The Real Bruce Lee 최후의精武門
- Directed by: Jim Markovic
- Written by: Larry Dolgin; Dick Randall
- Produced by: Serafim Karalexis; Dick Randall
- Starring: Bruce Lee; Bruce Li; Dragon Lee
- Release date: 1979
- Running time: 93 minutes 118 minutes (British video version)
- Countries: South Korea; Hong Kong
- Languages: Cantonese; English

The Real Bruce Lee, is a 1977 martial arts documentary that comes complete with a feature-length Korean martial arts film titled Last Fist of Fury (Korean: 최후의 정무문; RR: Choehuui jeongmumun).

The version of the film that is commonly distributed in the West (USA) on public domain-type DVD and video labels runs 93 minutes in length. The British VHS-version released in 1979 runs 118 minutes.

== Synopsis ==
It begins with a brief biography of Bruce Lee, and shows scenes from four of his childhood films, Bad Boy, Orphan Sam, Kid Cheung, and The Carnival, each sepia-toned and given a fully new soundtrack with dubbed English dialogue and a disco soundtrack such as an instrumental version of Devil's Gun by C. J. & Company.

Next, there is a three-minute highlight reel of Lee imitator Bruce Li.

== Last Fist of Fury ==
This fourth installment is a loose Korean take on other namesake films such as Bruce Lee's Fist of Fury (1972), Jackie Chan's New Fist of Fury (1976), and Bruce Li's Fist of Fury II (1977).

Japan has invaded China and started putting shame to the glorious past of the House of the Dragon kung-fu school. When they kill one of the pupils in an uneven match, a fellow fighter named Yǒu Lóng (龙友) who is also from the school has put his own life at risk after swearing to avenge his murdered kung-fu brother against every last foreign oppressor from Japan. The film stars another Bruce Lee imitator known as Dragon Lee.

== Sequel ==
In 2004, The Real Bruce Lee 2 was released.
