= Dragon Lee vs. The Five Brothers =

- Directed by: Si-Hyeon Kim, Yueh-Lin Liu
- Written by: Daniel Lau
- Starring: Dragon Lee
- Cinematography: Ming-i Shen
- Release date: 1978 (South Korea)
- Running time: 87 minutes

Dragon Lee vs. The Five Brothers is a 1978 Bruceploitation martial arts film starring Dragon Lee. The film is commonly included on public domain dvd sets.

== Synopsis ==
Dragon is trusted to deliver a list containing name of anti-Ching revolutionaries to the Ming leaders but is challenged by Ching loyalists along the way.

== Reception ==
The Video Vacuum gave the film 2 stars out of 4, and wrote: "The usually charismatic Dragon Lee gets lost in the shuffle and is unable to carry the cumbersome plot." Variedcelluloid.net said the film was "unfortunately everything you hope not to find in a martial arts flick" and called it boring and a dud.

== See also ==
- List of films in the public domain in the United States
