= Shadow Force (1992 film) =

1992 American action film by Ken Lamkin

Shadow Force is a 1992 American action film directed by Ken Lamkin.

== Plot ==
In the fictional town of Norman, close to San Antonio, the local police is composed of professional assassins. With one exception, the police chief down to the dispatcher are all on the payroll of a local racketeer who makes use of these paid killers to dispose of zealous law enforcement officials opposed to his operations. When the last remaining honorable member of the force (Glenn Corbett) is killed, his brother-in-law (Dirk Benedict), a homicide detective from an unidentified city in Kansas, begins an investigation of his own.

== Cast ==
- Dirk Benedict as Detective Rick Kelly
- Lise Cutter as Mary Denton
- Lance LeGault as Norman Police Chief Thorpe
- Dixie K. Wade as Maggie
- Steve Carlson as Mike Gorman
- Julius Tennon as Ron Fuller
- Bob Hastings as Norman Mayor Talbert
- Danny Spear as Sam Johnson
- Rey David Pena as Emilio Vela
- Glenn Corbett as Al Finch Sr.
