= Bruce Lee and I =

1976 Hong Kong film by Lo Mar

- Film poster

Chinese name
- Traditional Chinese: 李小龍與我
- Simplified Chinese: 李小龙与我
Transcriptions
Standard Mandarin
- Hanyu Pinyin: Lǐ Xiǎolóng yǔ wǒ
Yue: Cantonese
- Jyutping: Lei5 Siu2 Lung4 jyu4 ngo5
- Directed by: Lo Mar
- Written by: Suen A-Foo; Shu Lan; Evan Yang
- Produced by: Evan Yang; Betty Ting Pei
- Starring: Betty Ting Pei; Danny Lee
- Cinematography: Chan Ching-kui; Ng Faat-sam
- Edited by: Leung Wing-chan
- Music by: Koo Ka-fai
- Production companies: Shaw Brothers Studio; B. & B. Film Co.
- Distributed by: Intercontinental Video Limited
- Release date: 9 January 1976 (Hong Kong)
- Running time: 102 minutes
- Country: Hong Kong
- Language: Mandarin

Bruce Lee and I (Chinese: 李小龍與我, released in the United States as Bruce Lee: His Last Days, His Last Nights) is a 1976 Hong Kong biographical action film directed by Lo Mar, and starring Betty Ting Pei and Danny Lee. The film was released in Hong Kong on 9 January 1976. The film is based on Bruce Lee's last days leading up to his death in Pei's apartment at Hong Kong on 20 July 1973.

== Plot ==
The movie is mainly Betty Ting's story with Bruce Lee based on real life events. Opens with Betty and Bruce rolling around in bed around the time he died. Continues with Betty telling her story to a bartender, beginning when she was a loner school girl, she meets Bruce when he saves her from a beating one night and gives her some money. She then attempts to break into show biz and meets Bruce again: from there they become lovers until his death.

== Cast ==
- Betty Ting Pei as herself
- Danny Lee as Bruce Lee
- Nam Seok Hoon as Bar Manager Hearing Betty's Story
- Lu Chin-ku as Ruffian Zhao
- Chin Ti as Perverted Movie Producer
- Wong San as Lo Wei
- Chin Yuet-sang as Thug attacking Betty in bar
- Yuen Kwai as Thug attacking Betty in bar
- Alan Chui Chung-San as Thug attacking Betty in bar
- Yuen Cheung-yan as Thug attacking Betty in bar
- Yuen Shun-yi as Stuntman on Movie Set
- Lee Chiu as Stuntman on Movie Set
- Wong Mei as Stuntman on Movie Set
- Kong Cheun as Stuntman on Movie Set
- Chan Siu Kai as Stuntman on Movie Set
- Hsu Hsia as Thug
- Yen Shi Kwan as Thug
- Wynn Lau as Thug
- Chan Lau as Zhao's Thug
- Tino Wong as Zhao's Thug
- Chow Yun-kin as Zhao's Thug
- Wong Pau-gei as Thug
- Ho Pak-kwong as Waiter
- Nam Seok-hun as Bartender
- Chan Siu-gai as Extra on movie set
- Chu Yau-ko as Gambler
- Fung Ging-man
- Chin Chun

== See also ==
- List of Hong Kong films
- List of Hong Kong films of 1976
