= Blue Tornado (film) =

- Directed by: Antonio Bido (as Tony B. Dodd)
- Written by: Gino Capone; Antonio Bido
- Produced by: Giovanni Di Clemente; Domenico Lo Zito
- Starring: Dirk Benedict; Ted McGinley; Patsy Kensit
- Cinematography: Maurizio Dell'Orco
- Edited by: Franco Fraticelli
- Music by: Fabio Massimo Colasanti; Marco De Angelis; Elivio Moratto
- Release date: 1991
- Running time: 87 min
- Country: Italy
- Language: English

Blue Tornado is a 1991 Italian action thriller film directed by Antonio Bido and starring Dirk Benedict, Ted McGinley, and Patsy Kensit.

== Plot ==
In the course of experimenting a new flight maneuver, two pilots, Colonel Alex Long and Philip encounter a mysterious light beyond a mountain range. Phil becomes transfixed by the light, flies into it and vanishes. Alex returns alone and shocked by what he has seen. Later the remains of his colleague's plane are found. As inquiries ensue, Alex begins to believe a UFO was involved. He is accused of creating the UFO story as an alibi against allegations he sabotaged Philip's plane. He later meets Isabella who is also researching UFOs. They embark on a mission to rescue Philip.

== Cast ==
- Dirk Benedict as Alex Long
- Ted McGinley as Philip
- Patsy Kensit as Isabella
- David Warner as Commander
- Jeff Blynn as Colonel
- Donald Hodson as Professor J.H. Thomas
- Christopher Ahrens
