= Space Ninjas =

- Directed by: Scott McQuaid
- Written by: Scott McQuaid
- Starring: Dirk Benedict; Jon T. Benn; Yi Jane; Godfrey Ho; Brian Narelle; Damien Zachary
- Cinematography: Ganesh Venugopal
- Music by: Ambrose Ling
- Release date: 20 January 2019 (Horror On Sea Film Festival)
- Running time: 91 minutes
- Country: United Kingdom
- Language: English
- Budget: $20,000

Space Ninjas is a 2019 sci-fi comedy film written and directed by Scott McQuaid. It is about Ninjas from outer space who invade a high school. The film features Dirk Benedict, Jon T. Benn, Godfrey Ho, Yi Jane, Brian Narelle, Damien Zachary and Bryan Tiang.

== Plot ==
The story involves five misfit teenagers who are doing detention on a Saturday evening. A stylized television sci-fi show titled Stranger Than Fiction with its charismatic host Jack Strange airs its latest episode. This prelude introduces a classified incident that allegedly took place at a high school somewhere in Asia.

Tough skater girl Stanlei cruises down the school hallways creating havoc while the other classmates gather on the school steps as evening creeps in, awaiting teacher Mr. Hughes.

Characters include Zack the nerd, Tammy miss popular, Keiko the Japanese exchange student and Omar the jock. Meanwhile, Stanlei visits the eccentric science teacher Professor Rosencrantz, and after a bizarre talk involving toast, reasoning and cats she makes her way to detention. Mr. Hughes lectures the class on their behavior as Stanlei enters. After an ugly exchange of words between the two, Mr. Hughes leaves the class to continue their detention.

As the night progresses, an elite group of Space Ninjas invade the secluded school. After the Space Ninjas kill Mr. Hughes, the students are left to fend for themselves, trapped on the school grounds, fighting for survival.

As the hunt continues, the body count rises, with each student being killed off one by one. The remaining students seek help from Professor Rosencrantz. Together they decipher why this is happening and devise the best plan of escape. As the number of living students continues to drop, the survivors manage to kill a few ninjas. The Space Ninjas close in on the last surviving members of the group until only Stanlei is left. She engages in battle with the last Space Ninja. As night turns to day, the CIA surrounds the school grounds and the men in black enter the crime scene. The cigar-smoking Big Boss orders his men to sweep through the school campus, erasing any evidence of alien activity, making this incident another episode for the Stranger Than Fiction TV show, asking the viewer – was this fact or fiction? Their quest is to try to survive the night.

== Cast ==
- Yi Jane as Stanlei
- Dirk Benedict as Jack Strange
- Damien Zachary as Zack
- Mia Sara Shauki as Tammy
- Cassandra Foo as Keiko
- Amirul Afiq Bin Amri as Omar
- Brian Narelle as Professor Rosencrantz
- Razif Hashim as Mr. Hughes
- Bryan Tiang as Space Ninjas
- Jon T. Benn as Big Boss
- Godfrey Ho as the Janitor

== Production ==
The film was produced by Plastic Monkey Films and shot in Kuala Lumpur on a shoestring budget in an intense 22 days, filming through the night on location at an international high school. Although the director of photography, Ganesh Venugopal, shot the bulk of the movie, second unit scenes were filmed by the director, Scott McQuaid, and included scenes shot in America and Hong Kong. These scenes include the opening scene with Dirk Benedict as Jack Strange, shot in just four hours, and the government men-in-black scene with the late veteran actor Jon T. Benn, who died in December 2018 before the film's release. The scene of the Janitor played by cult B-movie director Godfrey Ho was shot in Kowloon in Hong Kong. This small cameo scene was written for Godfrey as an homage to his 1970's ninja B movies, which inspired the title Space Ninjas.

During the shoot at the high school, lead actress Yi Jane was taking her final exams at the same school. Despite the grueling all-night shooting schedule, she still managed to score perfect A's. The three Space Ninja assassins were all played by Bryan Tiang; due to the lack of budget there was only one costume.

McQuaid is a fan of American director John Carpenter’s work, so he cast Brain Narelle in his first feature film, as Carpenter had done in his debut B-movie Dark Star forty-five years earlier. Razif Hashim, famed for his Asian food TV show, was cast as Mr. Hughes after the director bumped into him at a theatre show. Damien Zachary, who played the comedic Zack character, slept on set some nights, so he didn't have to keep traveling back and forth. Cassandra Foo was cast as Keiko after the director saw her in a rendition of the musical Grease. Afiq Bin Amri was studying performing arts at college when he got the part of Omar, while actress Mia Sara Shauki, who played Tammy, went on to star in the Malaysian adaption of Wizards of Waverly Place.

In the original script, the location for the ninja invasion was a campsite, but after a few more drafts the narrative was re-visualized and set at a high school, noting homage ties to The Breakfast Club.

Scott McQuaid is credited as editor, writer, and director, but was also a second unit cameraman, props master, fight choreographer, executive producer, and sometimes the actual Space Ninja. He also has a cameo in the movie as a camera operator in the Stranger Than Fiction TV show. The film was primarily produced by his brother Lawson McQuaid with an executive producer credit to the late actor and director Wayne Crawford, who aided in script development with McQuaid. The film's first official trailer played at Asia Comic-Con in 2018 and was then selected for screening at Horror-on-Sea Film Festival. The film was immediately picked up for distribution a month later by My Spotlight Independent and SMG, streaming worldwide on Amazon prime, Apple TV, iTunes and Google Play.

== Reception ==
In its review, Horror Buzz said that the film was absurdly silly yet charming. In its review of the film, the Talk Nerdy reviewer didn't find Ninjas scary, threatening or even a menace, but said that B-movie horror comedy fans would love it.
