= Enter the Invincible Hero =

1977 South Korean-Hong Kong film by Kim Si-Hyun

- 흑표비객
- Directed by: Kim Si-Hyun
- Starring: Dragon Lee; Casanova Wong
- Distributed by: Hansen Media Corporation; An Asso Asia Film
- Release date: 10 December 1977
- Running time: 100 minutes
- Languages: Korean, Cantonese

Secret Bandit of Black Leopard commonly known as its international title Enter the Invincible Hero is 1977 Bruceploitation martial arts drama film starring a Korean Bruce Lee imitator Dragon Lee and Taekwondo master Casanova Wong. It is one of Dragon Lee and Casanova Wong's first collaboration.

== Plot ==
Ti-Meng the young man who is looking for the job offers his services for protection outfit. When the money from the village has stolen from the bandits Meng was compensate and everyone blamed him for losing all the money. However it turns out that all the money was stolen from the Pang who is also Ti-Meng's old school friend. Ti-Meng finds out the whole situation and decided to get all the money back from Pang. at first pang humiliates and defeats Ti-Meng. at the end fight Ti-meng defeats and kills pang with his new art

== Cast ==
- Dragon Lee - Ti-Meng
- Casanova Wong - Pang
- Choi Min Kyu - Wu Tin
- Lee Ye Min - Mr.Lee
- Kim Young Suk - Pang's gang
- Danny Tsui - as Pang's gang
- Chen Shao Lung - Killer of Pang's father (Archive footage from THE MAGNIFICENT)
- Lee Hoi Sang - (Intro fighter, archive footage from ENTER THREE DRAGONS)
- Seo Jeong Ah - Mr. Lee's daughter
- Kim Won Jin - extra

== Reception ==
In webpage Oocities the movie was fairly receive pretty well. J. Doyle Walls DVD Talk mentioned that movie is fairly decent as a Bruceploitation standard

== Production ==
Unlike usual Godfrey Ho movie the movie did not use that much cut and paste technique. However some of the archive footage from Enter Three Dragons and The Magnificent have been used in the movie.
