= The Black Fox =

1962 Hong Kong film by Yan Jun

- Film poster
- Directed by: Yan Jun
- Written by: Chen Yu-Hsin
- Produced by: Run Run Shaw
- Starring: Yan Jun; Feng Yi; John Law Ma
- Cinematography: Yan Jun (ShawScope, Technicolor)
- Edited by: Chiang Hsing-Lung
- Music by: Wang Fu-Ling
- Distributed by: Shaw Brothers
- Release date: 8 December 1962 (Hong Kong)
- Running time: 114 minutes
- Country: Hong Kong
- Languages: Mandarin; English dub, 1963

The Black Fox (Chinese: 黑狐狸) is a 1962 Hong Kong thriller film directed by Yan Jun. The film was produced under the Shaw Brothers banner in the Mandarin language.

== Cast ==
- Li Lihua
- Yan Jun
- Yeung Chi Hing
- Grace Ding Ning
- Cheung Kwong Chiu
- Hung Mei
- Chan Yau San
- Zhu Mu
- Feng Yi
- Ng Lai Ping
- John Law Ma
