= Kung Fu Finger Book =

1979 Hong Kong film by Ke Kao

Kung Fu Finger Book 小師傅與大煞星
- Directed by: Ke Kao; Kim Shi Hyun
- Written by: Ni Kuang
- Starring: Dragon Lee
- Release date: 6 February 1979 (South Korea)
- Countries: Taiwan; South Korea
- Language: Cantonese

Kung Fu Finger Book, originally released as Xiǎo Shīfù Yǔ Dà Shà Xīng (小師傅與大煞星, literally "The Little Master and the Big Fiend"), is a 1979 Hong Kong film starring Dragon Lee and Ron van Clief.

The film also goes by other titles such as Jung mu ji-bo (Korean: 정무지보), Jīng wǔ zhǐ pǔ (Chinese: 精武指譜), Never Give Up (South Korean title), Kung Fu Fever (international title), Black Dragon Fever (American dubbed version), and The Bloody Legacy of the Shaolin (French dubbed version).

== Plot ==
The footage is doctored to make it look like Bruce Lee is talking about his favourite student, Ricky Chen (Dragon Lee), who he endorses as a shih-fu of his "secret deadly finger technique". This notion of Lee writing an unpublished final book about a "secret deadly finger technique" is also explored in the previous film Bruce's Deadly Fingers (1976), and seems to be a running theme in the Bruceploitation sub-genre.

When Lee dies (which cues funeral footage), every two-bit crook from Hong Kong to Japan wants their fingers on Lee's finger book. Being his star pupil, Ricky is soon embroiled in the action, fending off the likes of hired killers (played by Ron Van Clief and Tam Yan-mei), a femme fatale in biker leathers who eventually switches her allegiance to the good guys.

This movie stretches a very thin premise almost to breaking point, saved only by a suitably hammy supporting role from Van Clief and a completely unhinged turn from Dragon Lee. He's absolutely deranged in this, looking glorious wearing the yellow Game of Death tracksuit for no good reason, thumbing his nose furiously while cockily strutting and kicking and screaming his head off.

== Cast ==
- Dragon Lee as Ricky Chan
- Ron Van Clief as Ron
- Choe Min Gyu as Master Mu Chu
- Tam Yan-Mei as Ms. Lu
- Shih Chung-Tien as Ma Hsiung
- Kim Ki Joo as Master Lee
- Lee Ye-Min as Ms. Lu's father
- Choe Hyung Guen as Yu Chien
- Ma Joo-Haeng as Ma's Muscle
- Jang Jeong-Guk as Ma's Muscle
- Jeong Joo Hyeon — Extra
- Lee Chang Mo — Extra
- Chan Kei Sing — Extra
- Chow Hoi — Extra
- Li Mei Mei — Extra
- Piao Tan Lee — Extra
