= The Master Strikes =

1980 Hong Kong film by Kao Pao-shu

- Traditional Chinese: 通天老虎
- Directed by: Kao Pao-shu
- Starring: Casanova Wong; Meng Yuen-Man; Ching Siu-Tung; Meg Lam Kin-Ming; Yen Shi-Kwan
- Distributed by: Park Films Ltd
- Release date: 20 March 1980
- Running time: 85 minutes
- Language: Mandarin Chinese

The Master Strikes (Also known as Fist of Tiger or Crazy Tiger Fist) is 1980 Hong Kong comedy martial arts movie set in 1920s and 1930s China. the film was directed by Kao Pao-shu and starring Casanova Wong, Meng Yuen-Man and Ching Siu-Tung.

== Plot ==
The film is set in the Qing period before Sun Yat-sen's revolt. Chen, a bodyguard, is entrusted by Lung Tung Chien to protect a rare treasure. After having a hard time to protecting the treasure (sleeping on the top to make sure the treasure is safe), he finds out it has been stolen. As a result, he becomes violently insane. The two con men Lung and Li find out about Chen and the treasure's connection, and they decide to help Chen to find the treasure in an attempt to get rich.

== Cast ==
- Casanova Wong as Chen
- Meng Yuen-Man as Li
- Ching Siu-Tung as Lung (action director)
- Yen Shi Kwan as Lung Tung Chien
- Meg Lam Kin-Ming
- Max Lee Chiu Jun as Beggar Su
- Chap Lap-Ban as old prostitute
- Hon Kwok Choi as waiter at the restaurant (cameo, uncredited)
- Wong Mei Mei
- Tony Leung Siu Hung as thug (assistant action director)
- Eddy Co Hung
- Fong Ping as prostitute
- Mama Hung as prostitute
- Yuen Bo
- Lee Fat Yuen as thug (extra, uncredited)

== Reception ==
Carl Davis of DVD Talk rated it 2.5/5 stars and compared it negatively to the contemporaneous films of Jackie Chan and Sammo Hung. J. Doyle Wallis, also writing for DVD Talk, rated it 2.5/5 stars and called it "a bit of low budget, martial comedy silliness."
