= John Law (film director) =

- Chinese: 羅馬
- Born: November 4, 1938 (age 87)
- Other names: John Law Ma, John Lomar, Law Chau-Woo, Lo Ma, Lo Mar
- Occupations: Film director, screenwriter, producer and actor
- Years active: 1957–1983

John Law was a Hong Kong film director and screenwriter best known for his films of the 1970s. Law is credited with 10 films as an actor, 35 films as a director, 15 films as a writer and 7 films as a producer.

== Early life ==
On November 4, 1938, Law was born in Taiwan.

== Career ==
In 1957, Law started his acting career in Hong Kong. Law first appeared in He Has Taken Him for Another, a 1957 Mandarin comedy film directed by Li Han-Hsiang. Law also appeared in The Lady of Mystery, a 1957 Mandarin thriller film directed by Wa Hak-Ngai.

Law wrote the script for the 1961 film The Search Of Loved One but by 1968 he had moved into directing and writing, directing his first film in this year entitled A Time for Reunion, a film which starred Alan Tang who would feature in many of his later films in the 1970s.

In the 1970s, John began working under the renowned Hong Kong film studios, Shaw Studio, responsible for producing many of Hong Kong's classic martial arts film during this period. In 1976 John directed and wrote the script for The Girlie Bar, an adult film oriented drama featuring Chan Ping, Yau Fung, Lin Chen Chi and James Nam and Tony Liu. Similarly his film later that year Bruce Lee and I starred Betty Ting, Danny Lee, Yuen Cheung and Tony Liu. His 1977 romance film Orchid in the Rain, which also starred frequent star in his films, Alan Tang, Brigitte Lin also pushed boundaries in terms of intimacy on screen.

He would however, direct several kung fu films, notably in 1979 the films Monkey Kung Fu and Five Super Fighters, and Boxer from the Temple in 1981. Boxer from the Temple was to be his last film as a director and under Shaw Studios.

Law is credited with 10 films as an actor, 35 films as a director, 15 films as a writer and 7 films as a producer.

== Filmography ==
- The Lady of Mystery (1957) - Actor
- The Search of Loved One (1961) - Writer
- The Black Fox (1962) - Actor
- The Love Eterne (1963) - Actor
- The Empress Wu Tse-Tien (1963) - Actor
- A Time for Reunion (1968) - Director, Writer
- Red Light, Green Light (1969) - Director
- Miss Not Home (1970) - Director, Writer
- Money and I (1971) - Director, Writer
- Maria (1971) - Director, Writer
- Bus Stop (1971) - Director, Writer
- Black List (1972) - Director, Writer
- Tiger (1973) - Director, Writer
- Black Guide (1973) - Director, Writer
- Back Street (1973) - Director
- The Crazy Bumpkins (1974) - Director
- Thief of Thieves (1975) - Director
- Return of the Crazy Bumpkin (1975) - Director
- The Happy Trio (1975) - Director
- The Girlie Bar (1976) - Director, Original Story
- Crazy Bumpkin in Singapore (1976) - Director
- Bruce Lee and I (1976) - Director, Lyricist
- Big Times for The Crazy Bumpkins (1976) - Director and Writer
- Forever and Ever (a.k.a. Orchid in the Rain) (1977) - Director
- To Love Or Not To Love (1978) - Director
- The Chase (1978) - Director
- Monkey Kung Fu (a.k.a. Stroke of Death) (1979) - Director, Writer.
- Five Super Fighters (1979) - Director
- Busting Prostitution Rackets (1979) - Director
- Young Outcasts (1980) - Director
- Boxer from the Temple (1981) - Director
- The Black Sheep (1983) - Writer
