= Forever and Ever (film) =

1977 Hong Kong film by John Law

- Film poster
- Directed by: John Law; Art director: Jonathan Ting
- Written by: Lan Su
- Produced by: Wong Hei-Wan
- Starring: Candice Yu; Alan Tang; Tang Ching; Jenny Hu; Ouyang Sha-fei
- Cinematography: Wu Fa-Shen
- Edited by: Vincent Leung Wing-Chan
- Music by: Joseph Koo
- Production companies: Dai Yat; Lo Mar Film Company
- Release date: 1977
- Running time: 76 minutes
- Country: Hong Kong
- Language: Mandarin

Forever and Ever or Impetuous Fire (Original title: Jin sheng jin shi, Chinese: 今生今世), is a 1977 Hong Kong romantic drama film, directed by John Law (Mar Lo). Its Chinese title, "Jin Shung Jin Shi," literally means "This Life, This World."

The film stars Alan Tang (Tang Kwon-Wing,), one of the notable actors in Hong Kong romantic and martial arts films during the 1970s. It co-stars a young Candice Yu (Yu On-On,)in one of the earliest projects in her career. She would later go on to become the first wife of Chow Yun-fat. The score was composed by Joseph Koo Ka-Fai.

The film is often mistakenly listed as a 1972 film by the Hong Kong films archives, given that the leading actress Candice Yu would have been only 12 years old in 1972.

== Plot ==
Young Iris (Candice Yu), diagnosed with an incurable disease, has her parents’ consent to travel the world before the end.

Accompanied by her governess Mrs. Hsia, she comes to Hong Kong for only seven days. She runs into a convicted killer Tai-Lun (Alan Tang) upon arriving, and as telepathy will have it, they fall deeply in love. Tai-Lun, who has just broken out of jail in Macau, is an orphan brought up by Father Ma. He is sentenced to death for accidentally killing three people in a fight.

The two lovers, each facing a mutual plight, choose to love the moment and hide the truth from each other. Their guardians, Mrs. Hsia and Father Ma, find out about their love and decide to confide in each other and help the pair keep up their fantasy. There Iris and Tai-Lun are able to enjoy their bitter-sweet love for only the seven days.

== Cast ==
- Candice Yu - Iris
- Alan Tang - Tai-Lun
- Tang Ching - The Cop
- Jenny Hu - The Teacher
- Ouyang Sha-fei - The Priest
- Cho Kin
- Chen Kuan Tai

== Reception and critique ==
Due to the general lack of accurate record keeping by respective filming commissions in Asian countries back in the 1970s, The exact earnings of this film was unknown. However, it was certainly not a top-grossing film that year. Its legacy might be that it inspired a successful remake many years later.

Critically, the film drew mixed reviews. One critic called the script "insipid and dull" while others expressed approval of the fictional and fantasized story line. The love scene in the film deserves a special mention, given that most Chinese romance movies at the time avoided sexual themes and only featured light, conservative "dry" kisses, Tang and Yu embrace in a very passionate kissing scene, with Tang baring his chest and Yu wearing only lingerie. The kissing scene along with the partial undressing, exceeded usual standards at this time and appeared well ahead of its time.

== 1994 remake ==
This film was remade into a made-for-TV movie for a Chinese TV sub-network in the United States in 1994. The low-budget remake, starring actor Tim Chang, and introducing a very young, singer-actress Sandy Wu, became a surprise hit. It was directed by H. C. Tang, a successful producer-director in the Chinese-American entertainment industry.

The remake followed much of the storyline as the original, with the only major change being its location-from Hong Kong to the US. It also focused more on the love story of the leading couple and paid less attention to the supporting roles. Whereas comparing to the fighting scenes in the original, leading man Tim Chang did some singing instead in the remake, while Wu sings for the title song herself.

The love scene in the remake by Chang and Wu was also highly sexualised and realistic. The remake has not been released worldwide.
