= Paul Wei Ping-ao =

Chinese actor

- Born: 29 November 1929; Nanjing, China
- Died: 3 December 1989 (aged 60); British Hong Kong
- Years active: 1949–1989

Chinese name
Transcriptions
Standard Mandarin
- Hanyu Pinyin: Wèi Píngào
Yue: Cantonese
- Jyutping: Ngai6 Ping4-ou3

Wei Ping-ao (29 November 1929 – 3 December 1989), also known as Paul Wei, was a Hong Kong–based Chinese actor who started his career in the Shaw Brothers Studio. He is best known for playing cunning interpreters in Bruce Lee's 1972 films Fist of Fury and Way of the Dragon, in which he dubbed his own voice, and also appeared in films such as Deaf Mute Heroine (1971), Hapkido (1972) and Fists of Bruce Lee (1978). He suffered from jaundice in his later years. He died on 3 December 1989 in British Hong Kong.

== Selected filmography ==
- Happenings in Ali Shan (1950)
- Mei gang chun hui (1955)
- Ma che fu zhi lian (1956)
- Guan shan xing (1956)
- Gui lai (1958)
- Chang feng wan li (1958)
- Yin rong jie (1960)
- Liang xiang hao (1962) − Chen Hsi−Ting
- Huo shao gong lian si Xia ji (1963)
- Shan ze (1966)
- Du mei gui (1966) − Old Fourth
- Duan chang jian (1967)
- Feng liu tie han (1967) − Chien Kun
- Ming ri zhi ge (1967) − Announcer in TV Show
- Qing chun gu wang (1967) − Promoter Li Yuen Ming
- Qi xia wu yi (1967) − Chiang Ping
- Hua yue liang xiao (1968) − Wei Chung−Liang
- Guai xia (1968) − Sha Yu−fu
- Hu xia (1968) − Maoshan Priest
- Si bu mi ren ren zi mi (1968)
- Zhui hun biao (1968)
- Diao jin gui (1969) − Mr. Jiang
- Fei yan jin dao (1969) − Master Jin
- San xiao (1969) − Chu Chi−san
- Xiang si he pan (1969) − Li Laosan
- Ren tou ma (1969)
- Ye lin chun lian (1969) − Mr. Sun
- Yi chi chun shui (1970)
- Shuang xi ling men (1970)
- Cha chi hu (1970) − You Ming
- Nu jian kuang dao (1970) − Chang's son
- E lang gu (1970)
- Hua sin cai shen (1970)
- Wo bu yao li hun (1970)
- Long ya jian (1971) − Sun Lu
- Liu fu cha lou (1971)
- Chao piao yu wo (1971)
- Fist of Fury (1972) − Interpreter Wu
- The Way of the Dragon (1972) − Ho
- Hapkido (1972) − Chang Pu−tse
- Tou qing shi jie (1972)
- Feng cong na li lai (1972)
- Chou tou xiao zi (1972)
- Niu gui she shen (1973)
- Fist of Unicorn (1973) − San Tin
- Chun man Dan Mai (1973) − Travel Agent
- Ze wang (1973) − Policeman
- Ying chun ge zhi Fengbo (1973)
- Da zhang fu yu sao gua fu (1973)
- Mi huan xiong shou (1974)
- Wu long jiao yi (1974)
- Zhu Jiang da feng bao (1974)
- Chuo tou zhuang yuan (1974)
- Da jiao long (1974)
- Shui wei cai (1974)
- Tian tian bao xi (1974)
- She mo nu da nao dou shi (1974)
- Qi qing liu yu (1974)
- Lao nu ri ji (1975)
- Lao fu zi (1975)
- Yin hai lang zi (1975)
- Da qian shi jie (1975)
- Bu bu jing hun (1975)
- Yin shen da fa shi (1975)
- Xiao Shandong dao Xianggang (1975)
- Long men feng yun (1975)
- Da Ming ying lie (1975)
- Bao gong shen pi pa (1975)
- Dong fang hua zhu ye (1976)
- Gui jia (1976)
- Ha ha xiao (1976)
- Chun man Ba Di Ya (1976)
- Tang shan jie quan dao (1976)
- Li Xiao Long zhuan qi (1976)
- Xia nu bao ta jie (1976)
- Re ye (1976)
- Gui ma shi jie (1976)
- Du bi dao da zhan du bi dao (1977)
- Jue bi tai yang ta (1977)
- Zheng He xia xi yang (1977)
- Jiao jiao bing tuan (1977)
- Zhi zun wei long (1977)
- Yong chun jie quan (1977) − Wu Chi
- Mo gui gwai ying (1977)
- Long wang san tai zi (1977)
- Jin nígu (1977)
- Jiang Nan ba da xia (1977)
- Hong lou chun shang chun (1978)
- Chuan ji Fang Shi Yu (1978)
- Jia you shi er ge xi fu (1978)
- Fists of Bruce Lee (1978) − Outpuss
- Jie quan ying zhua gong (1979)
- Tian cai lao qian (1979)
- Jue zhao liu shi (1979)
- Yu tou dai lao ben tu di (1979)
- Shi xiong shi di zhai chu ma (1979) − Master Chan Chi
- Qi quan guai tui qi ba xing (1979)
- Guai quan xiao zi (1979) − Master Hu
- Bruce − King of Kung Fu (1980) − Mr. Wang, movie−producer
- Tu bao zi da tong guan (1980)
- Ji dan peng shi tou (1981)
- Mo deng qing bao yuan (1981)
- Chuan qi ren wu (1981)
- Feng kuang shi jie (1981)
- Shen tai mao (1981)
- Sun Bin xia shan dou pang juan (1981)
- Chong po gong fu cheng (1981)
- Huo Yuan−Jia (1982) − Japanese Lackey (uncredited)
- Chi se Xiang Wei she (1982)
- Long zhi ren zhe (1982) − Doctor in Clinic
- Long de ying zi (1982)
- Sun Wu Kong dai zhan fei ren kuo (1982)
- Xin huo shao Hong Lian si (1982)
- Xue yu gou yang duo hun di (1982)
- Shao Lin san shi liu ban deng (1982)
- Shao Lin nian si liu ma (1982)
- First Exposure (1982)
- Du wang qian wang qun ying hui (1982)
- Ren she da zhan (1983)
- Yi zhi xiao yu san (1983)
- Wo ai wai guo ren (1983)
- Da zhui ji (1983)
- Jin da ban de zui hou yi ye (1984)
- Gui ma tian shi (1984)
- Wu lu cai shen da xian shen tong (1984)
- Jungle Heat (1985)
- Zui hou yi kou qi (1985)
- Ta shi wo ge ge (1985)
- Lang nu (1985)
- Hao xiao zi di er ji (1986)
- Qiang xia liu ren (1987)
- Miracles (1989)
- Tong chiu gam gung huk ying (1994) − (final film role)
