= Dirk Benedict =

American actor (born 1945)

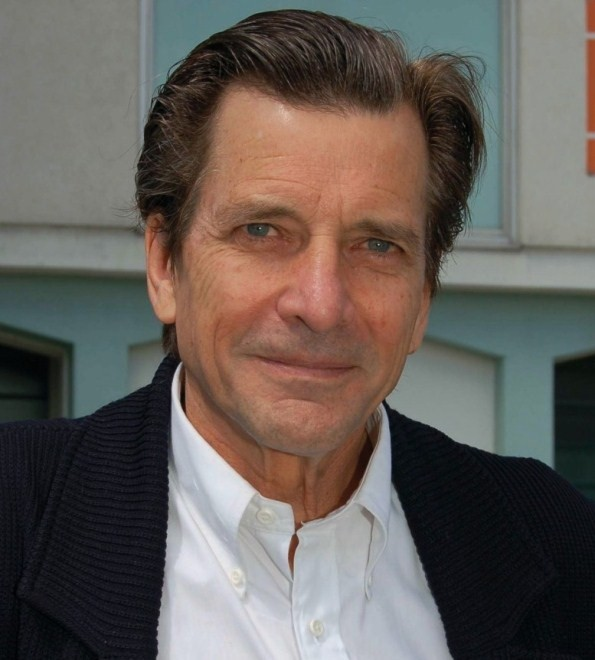
- Benedict in 2012
- Born: Dirk Niewoehner; March 1, 1945 (age 81); Helena, Montana, U.S.
- Education: Whitman College
- Occupations: Actor; author
- Years active: 1972–present
- Known for: The A-Team; Battlestar Galactica
- Spouse: Toni Hudson (m. 1986; div. 1995)
- Children: 3
- Website: dirkbenedictcentral.com

Signature
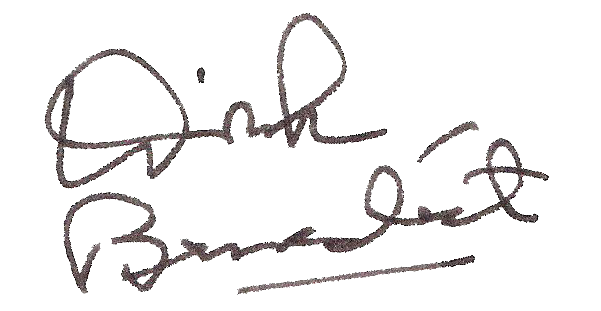

Dirk Benedict (born Dirk Niewoehner; March 1, 1945) is an American actor and author. He is best known for playing the characters Lieutenant Starbuck in the original Battlestar Galactica film and television series and Templeton "Face" Peck in The A-Team television series. He is the author of Confessions of a Kamikaze Cowboy and And Then We Went Fishing.

== Early life ==
Benedict was born Dirk Niewoehner on March 1, 1945, in Helena, Montana, the son of George Edward Niewoehner, a lawyer, and his wife Priscilla Mella (née Metzger), an accountant. He grew up in White Sulphur Springs, Montana. He graduated from Whitman College in 1967. Benedict allegedly chose his stage name from a serving of Eggs Benedict he had prior to his acting career. He is of German descent.

== Career ==
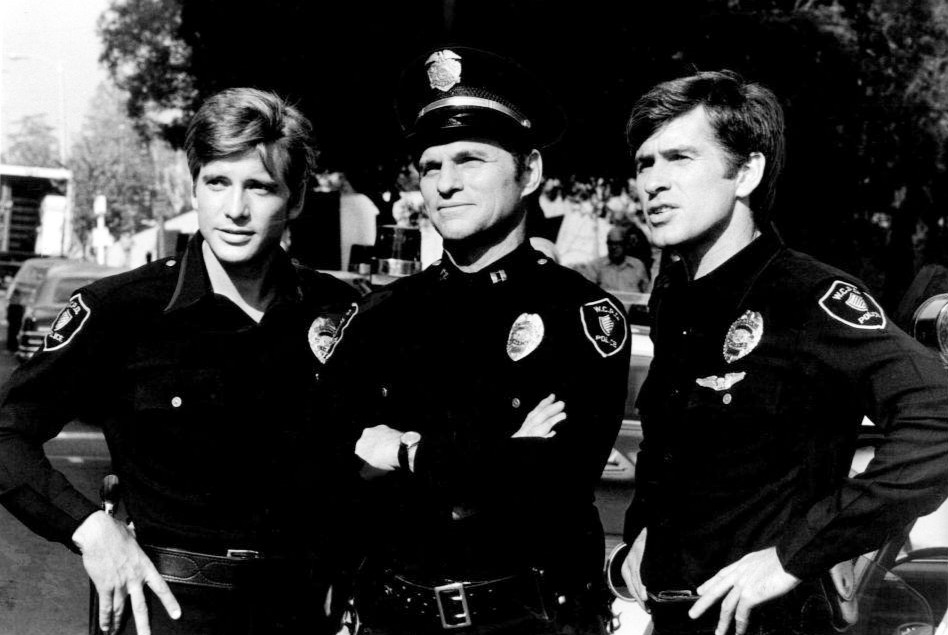
Photo of the cast of the short-lived television program Chopper One. From left: Dirk Benedict, Ted Hartley, Jim McMullan.

Benedict's film debut was in the 1972 film Georgia, Georgia. When the New York run for Butterflies Are Free ended, he received an offer to repeat his performance in Hawaii, opposite Barbara Rush. While there, he appeared as a guest lead on Hawaii Five-O. The producers of a horror film called Sssssss (1973) saw Benedict's performance in Hawaii Five-O and promptly cast him as the lead in that movie, in which his character falls victim to a sinister experiment. He next played the psychotic wife-beating husband of Twiggy in her American film debut, W (1974). Benedict starred in the television series Chopper One, which aired for one season in 1974. He made two appearances in Charlie's Angels. He also appeared on the Donny & Marie variety show.

Benedict's career break came in 1978 when he appeared as Lieutenant Starbuck in the movie and television series Battlestar Galactica. The same year, Benedict starred in the TV film, Cruise into Terror, and appeared in the ensemble movie, Scavenger Hunt the following year.

=== 1980s and 1990s ===
In 1980, Benedict starred alongside Linda Blair in an action-comedy movie called Ruckus. In 1983, Dirk gained further popularity as con man Templeton "Faceman" Peck in 1980s action television series The A-Team. He played "Face" from 1982 to 1986, although the series didn't air until January 1983, and the final episode wasn't shown until 1987 rebroadcasts. The second season episode "Steel" includes a scene at Universal Studios where Face is seen looking bemused as a Cylon walks by him as an in-joke to his previous role in Battlestar Galactica. The clip is incorporated into the series' opening credit sequence from season 3 onward.

In 1986, Benedict starred as low-life band manager Harry Smilac in the movie Body Slam along with Lou Albano, Roddy Piper, and cameo appearances by Freddie Blassie, Ric Flair, and Bruno Sammartino. His character Smilac ends up managing the pro-wrestler "Quick Rick" Roberts (Piper) and faces opposition by Captain Lou Murano (Albano) and his wrestling tag-team "the Cannibals".

In 1987, Benedict took the title role of Shakespeare's Hamlet at the Abbey Theatre in Manhattan. Both his performance and the entire production were lambasted by critics. Benedict starred in the 1989 TV film Trenchcoat in Paradise.

In 1991, Benedict starred in Blue Tornado, playing Alex, call sign Fireball, an Italian Air Force fighter pilot. Benedict published an autobiography, Confessions of a Kamikaze Cowboy: A True Story of Discovery, Acting, Health, Illness, Recovery, and Life (Avery Publishing ISBN 0895294796). In 1993, Benedict starred in Shadow Force.

Benedict also appeared as Jake Barnes in the 1996 action-adventure film Alaska.

=== 2000s and 2010s ===
In 2000, Benedict wrote and directed his first screenplay, Cahoots. Benedict appeared in the 2006 German film Goldene Zeiten ("Golden Times") in a dual role, playing an American former TV star as well as a German lookalike who impersonates him.

In 2006, he wrote an online essay criticizing the then-airing Battlestar Galactica re-imagined series and, especially, its casting of a woman as his character, Starbuck, writing that "the war against masculinity has been won" and that "a television show based on hope, spiritual faith, and family is unimagined and regurgitated as a show of despair, sexual violence and family dysfunction".

He appeared as a contestant on the 2007 UK series of Celebrity Big Brother 5, in which he placed third. He arrived on launch night in a replica of the A-Team van, smoking a cigar and accompanied by the A-Team theme tune.

In 2010, Benedict starred in a stage production of Prescription: Murder playing Lieutenant Columbo for the Middle Ground Theatre Company in the UK. Benedict also made a cameo appearance in the 2010 film adaptation of The A-Team as Pensacola Prisoner Milt.

In 2019, Benedict took on the role of Jack Strange in the B movie Space Ninjas, written and directed by Scott McQuaid. Dirk plays an eccentric TV host of a show called Stranger Than Fiction, which is like a hybrid of The Twilight Zone and The X-Files. The movie is a sci-fi comedy horror that follows a bunch of high school students trying to survive the night of a Space Ninja invasion.

== Personal life ==
=== Cancer ===
In the 1970s, Benedict survived a prostate tumor, which he refused to have tested for malignancy. Having rejected conventional medical treatment, he credited his survival to the adoption of a macrobiotic diet recommended to him by actress Gloria Swanson.

=== Marriage and family ===
In 1986, he married Toni Hudson, an actress with whom he has two sons. Hudson had previously appeared as Dana in the fourth season A-Team episode titled "Blood, Sweat and Cheers". They divorced in 1995.

In 1998, Benedict learned that he also has another son from an earlier relationship, who was placed for adoption.

== Filmography ==
=== Film ===
Year	Title	Role	Notes
1972	Georgia, Georgia	Michael Winters	
1973	Sssssss	David Blake	
1974	W	William Caulder	a.k.a. I Want Her Dead
1978	Battlestar Galactica	Lieutenant Starbuck	
1979	Scavenger Hunt	Jeff Stevens	
1980	Ruckus	Kyle Hanson	a.k.a. Ruckus in Madoc County
1981	Underground Aces	Pete Huffman	
1986	Body Slam	M. Harry Smilac	
1991	Blue Tornado	Alex Long	
1992	Shadow Force	Detective Rick Kelly	
1994	Demon Keeper	Alexander Harris	
1995	The Feminine Touch	John Mackie	Direct-to-video; a.k.a. The November Conspiracy
1996	Alaska	Jake Barnes	
1998	The Adventures of Young Brave	Tyler	a.k.a. Waking Up Horton
2001	Cahoots	—	Director and writer
2006	Goldene Zeiten	Douglas Burnett / John Striker / Horst Müller	
2007	Recon 7 Down	Tom Myers	
2009	Inglorious Bumblers	Tom Mayers	Direct-to-video
2010	The A-Team	Milt, Pensacola Prisoner	
2019	Space Ninjas	Jack Strange	
2020	Charlie's Christmas Wish	Stanley	

=== Television ===
Year	Title	Role	Notes
1972	Hawaii Five-O	Walter Clyman	Episode: "Chain of Events"
1974	Chopper One	Officer Gil Foley	13 episodes; Main cast
1975	Journey from Darkness	Bill	TV film
1977	Charlie's Angels	Cadet John Barton	Episode: "The Blue Angels"
1977	The Cabot Connection	Brom Loomis	Pilot episode
1978	Cruise Into Terror	Simon McLane	TV film
1978	Charlie's Angels	Denny Railsback	Episode: "The Jade Trap"
1978–1979	Battlestar Galactica	Lieutenant Starbuck	24 episodes; Main cast
1980	Galactica 1980	Lieutenant Starbuck	Episode: "The Return of Starbuck"
1980	The Georgia Peaches	"Dusty" Tyree	TV film; a.k.a. Follow That Car
1980	The Love Boat	Jeff Dalton	Episode: "That's My Dad"
1982	Family in Blue	Matt Malone	TV pilot episode
1983	The Love Boat	Gary Wells	Episode: "The Dog Show: Whose Dog Is It Anyway?"
1983–1987	The A-Team	Lieutenant Templeton "Faceman" Peck	96 episodes; Main cast
1984	Hammer House of Mystery and Suspense	Frank Rowlett	Episode: "Mark of the Devil"
1985	Amazing Stories	"Face"	Episode: "Remote Control Man"
1987	Hotel	Trevor Harris	Episode: "Prized Possessions"
1989	Murder, She Wrote	Dr. David Latimer	Episode: "Smooth Operators"
1989	Alfred Hitchcock Presents	Dr. Rush	Episode: "In the Name of Science"
1989	Trenchcoat in Paradise	Eddie Mazda	TV film
1991	Bejewelled	Gordon	TV film
1992	Baywatch	Aaron Brody	Episode: "Rookie of the Year"
1993	Official Denial	Lieutenant Colonel Dan Lerner	TV film
1993	The Commish	Gil Higgins	Episode: "All That Glitters"
1995	Walker, Texas Ranger	Blair	Episode: "Case Closed"
1995	Murder, She Wrote	Gary Harling	Episode: "Frozen Stiff"
1996	Abduction of Innocence	Robert Steves	TV film
2006	Earthstorm	Victor Stevens	TV film

== Video games ==
Year	Title	Role
1997	Zork: Grand Inquisitor	Antharia Jack
2003	Battlestar Galactica	Lieutenant Starbuck
