= Middle Ground Theatre Company =

Middle Ground Theatre Company began in October 1988 and it is now one of the Midlands’ most prolific and acclaimed production companies, with over thirty productions under its belt.

== Past Productions ==
- Dial M for Murder
- Gaslight
- Spring & Port Wine
- Brief Encounter
- An Inspector Calls
- An Ideal Husband
- The Importance of Being Earnest
- The Railway Children
- Far From The Madding Crowd.

Middle Ground's artistic director and theatrical producer is founder member Michael Lunney.
