= Enter Three Dragons =

1978 Hong Kong film by Joseph Kong

- Film poster
- Traditional Chinese: 快拳怪招
- Directed by: Joseph Kong
- Written by: On Szeto
- Starring: Bruce Lai; Nick Cheung Lik; Dragon Lee; Samuel Walls; Philip Ko
- Cinematography: Chi Yu
- Edited by: Wing-Chan Leung
- Music by: Stanley Chow Fuk-leung
- Distributed by: Asso Asia Films
- Release date: 11 June 1978
- Running time: 87 minutes
- Country: Hong Kong
- Language: Cantonese

Enter Three Dragons is 1978 Hong Kong martial art Bruceploitation movie, directed by Joseph Kong and starring Bruce Lai (Chang Yi-tao), Nick Cheung Lik and Philip Ko. Actor Dragon Lee made his Hong Kong film debut in the film.

== Plot ==
Sammy is having a trouble with the gangsters after he had lost the diamonds that his boss had ordered to bring. Sammy`s friend Dragon Hong (Chang Yi-tao) and Min Young (Nick Cheung) decides to help Sammy to defeat the gangster boss.

== Cast ==
- Dragon Lee as Bruce Hong (Dragon Hong`s brother)
- Bruce Lai as Dragon Hong
- Nick Cheung Lik as Min Young
- Philip Ko as Kao Fei
- Samuel Walls as Sammy
- To Siu-ming as Ah Ming
- San Kuai as Loan Shark for Ah Ming
- Chiang Tao as Sammy`s Boss
- Tiger Yang Seong Oh as Thunderkick
- Fong Yau as Kao Fei`s younger brother
- Lam Hak-ming as George (Sammy`s friend)
- Yeung Chak-lam as Min Young`s teacher
- Chang Chung-yee as Dragon Young (Fake Dragon Hong)
- Shirley Kam as Katy (Min Young`s sister)
- Bolo Yeung as Bolo
- Lee Hoi-sang as Iron Head

== Reception ==
According to website Cityonfire, "Enter Three Dragons isn't as wacky as 'The Clones of Bruce Lee,' but there's definitely enough unintentional entertainment that makes it just as fun." They rated the film 6 out of 10. However, the movie frequently confusese audiences due to its random additional fight scenes and edits. Screen Mayhem says, "Enter Three Dragons might be considered the ugly step-sister of The Clones of Bruce Lee. Once again packed with too many dragons."

== Alternate titles and production ==
The film was released internationally under multiple alternate titles, which confused some audiences. In Korea, the film was released under the title Three Avengers. Meanwhile, in the U.S., the film was titled Dragon on Fire, which also happens to be an alternate title of The Dragon, the Hero (featuring John Liu and Dragon Lee), creating confusion around both Enter Three Dragons and Dragon on Fire.

The U.S. production was done by Samuel Wall (who appeared as Sammy in the movie); however, it was credited to Joseph Lai and Tomas Tang.

Godfrey Ho was co-director of this film.
