= Betty Ting =

Taiwanese actress

- 丁珮
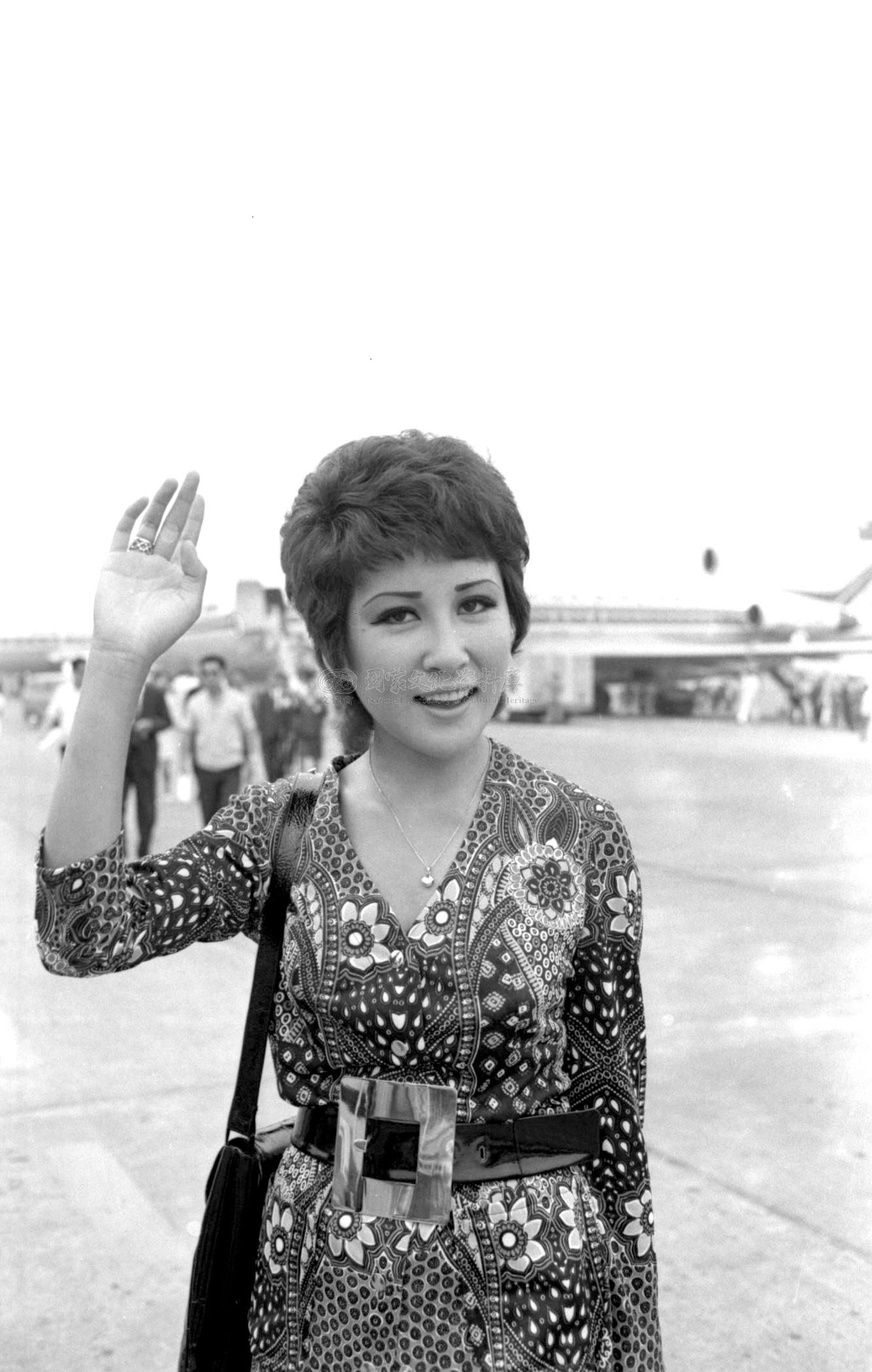
- Photograph of Ting taken in 1970
- Born: Tang Mei-li (唐美麗); 19 February 1947 (age 79); Taipei City, Taiwan, Republic of China
- Other names: Ting Pei, Betty Ting Pei
- Education: Taipei American School
- Occupation: Actress
- Years active: 1963–1985
- Known for: being the center of international speculation regarding the death of Bruce Lee in her apartment
- Notable work: The Best Time With Bruce Lee (2015)
- Height: 1.6 m (5 ft 3 in)
- Spouse: Charles Heung (m. 1976; div. 1978)
- Children: Candy Heung (daughter)

Chinese name
- Traditional Chinese: 丁珮
- Simplified Chinese: 丁佩
Transcriptions
Standard Mandarin
- Hanyu Pinyin: Dīng Pèi

Tang Mei-li
- Traditional Chinese: 唐美麗
- Simplified Chinese: 唐美丽
Transcriptions
Standard Mandarin
- Hanyu Pinyin: Táng Měilì

Betty Ting (simplified Chinese: 丁佩; traditional Chinese: 丁珮; pinyin: Dīng Pèi; born Tang Mei-li (唐美丽; 唐美麗; Táng Měilì); 19 February 1947) is a Taiwanese former actress who was mainly active in the 1970s. Ting is best known for being the center of international speculation regarding the death of Bruce Lee in her apartment. Ting is credited with over 50 films.

== Early life ==
Ting was born as Tang Mei-li in Taipei City, Taiwan, Republic of China on 19 February 1947. Ting comes from a medical family of three generations. Ting's uncle was Zhang Xueliang, and her maternal grandfather was Bao Yulin, the chief police officer of the Beiping Police Bureau during the Warlord era.

== Career ==
Ting started her acting career with Central Motion Picture Corporation in 1963. In January 1967, after acting in seven Taiwanese films, she was spotted by Shaw Brothers' director, Peter Pan Lei, and thereafter adopted the screen name of Ting Pei. Her first film in Hong Kong was The Purple Shell, where she acted as a dance hostess.

Although Ting had acted in dramas, comedies, musicals, and martial arts films, she is better known in Asia for her mistress roles and her many steamy bedroom scenes. She was a regular of director Inoue Umetsugu, for whom she performed in the musicals, The Millionaire Chase, The Yellow Muffler, and The Steam Stealers.

In 1973, Ting became a freelance actress and continued to make films both in her native Taiwan and Hong Kong. She retired from acting in 1985. Ting is credited with over 50 films.

== Personal life ==
In 1972, just after her six months in Switzerland, Ting first met Bruce Lee at the original Hyatt Regency Hong Kong (1969–2005) while he was with his wife Linda Emery and Raymond Chow, the owner of Golden Harvest. Ting and Lee quickly became friends and they would later go on dates.

On 20 July 1973, Ting received media attention when Lee died in her apartment at 67 Beacon Hill Road, Kowloon Tong, Hong Kong. According to press reports, Lee was going over the script of Game of Death in Ting's apartment, a film in which she was reported to have a lead role, when he complained of a headache. She gave him a single tablet of Equagesic, a strong aspirin-based drug that she often used herself. He then went to sleep, but when she could not wake him up for a dinner appointment with Raymond Chow, Chow came to Ting's apartment and attempted to call Lee's personal doctor at least 20 times. Failing to connect, Chow then called Ting's personal doctor who arrived 20 minutes later. He detected no heartbeat or breathing. He attempted CPR before calling for an ambulance. Lee did not arrive at the hospital until after 11:00 p.m., 6 hours after Lee took a pain pill provided by Ting and laid down to take a nap. Ting called an ambulance. Lee was rushed to Queen Elizabeth Hospital, where he was pronounced dead on arrival. Death was allegedly caused by an allergic reaction that resulted in brain edema (swelling of the brain). The coroner described his passing as "death by misadventure." Having lost her friend and also being blamed and receiving death threats by his fans for his death, Ting developed mental health issues. In the aftermath Ting would appear in two works about her relationship with Lee told from her perspective, the 1973 short documentary The Last Days of Bruce Lee and the 1976 feature film Bruce Lee and I, where Ting played herself.

In 1976, Ting married Charles Heung and they had a daughter Candy Heung in 1977, Ting and Heung divorced in 1980, after which she would devoted her time to Buddhism practices and helped the local Buddhist community in Hong Kong.

On the 30th anniversary of Bruce Lee's death in 2003, Ting made an announcement at a press conference of her plans to write her autobiography. In 2006, during a radio interview Ting admitted that she and Lee had been lovers for more than a year before his death. In 2008, she revealed that she had already written more than 7,000 words and that Taiwan, Hong Kong, mainland China and Overseas authors had offered to serve as her co-author, the project was halted indefinitely as Ting said that it was not "the right time" due to its complicated contents which involved other people.

In 2013, forty years after Lee's death, although Ting admitted that she had an intimate relationship with Lee, she said that she did not engage in any sexual activity with him on the day that he died.

On 20 July 2015, the 42nd anniversary of Bruce Lee's death, The Best Time With Bruce Lee, the biography of Ting's relationship with Bruce Lee was published by the Beijing Times Chinese Press.

== Partial filmography ==
- 1963 Oyster Girl
- 1965 Beautiful Duckling
- 1965 Four Loves
- 1965 The Silent Wife
- 1965 The Monument of Virtue
- 1966 Qiao
- 1966 Poisonous Rose - Woman in hotel.
- 1967 The Purple Shell
- 1968 Tomorrow is Another Day
- 1968 The Brain-Stealers
- 1969 Dear Murderer
- 1969 The Singing Escort
- 1969 The Millionaire Chase
- 1970 Hellgate
- 1970 Apartment For Ladies - Yau Suk Man.
- 1971 The Night is Young
- 1972 The Yellow Muffler
- 1972 The Fourteen Amazons
- 1972 Stranger in Hong Kong
- 1972 Madness of Love
- 1973 Love Across the Seas
- 1973 Adultery Chinese Style
- 1973 The Call Girls
- 1973 The Rendezvous of Warriors
- 1974 The Chinese Godfather
- 1974 Naughty Naughty
- 1974 Stoner
- 1974 The Looks of Hong Kong
- 1974 Games Gamblers Play
- 1975 A Debt of Crime
- 1975 The Playboy
- 1975 The Evidence
- 1975 Old Master Q
- 1976 Bruce Lee and I
- 1978 My Darling Girls
- 1978 The Mysterious Footworks of Kung Fu
- 1981 Mahjong Heroes
- 1982 The 82 Tenants
- 1985 My Name Ain't Suzie

== Works ==
- 2015: The Best Time With Bruce Lee (李小龙和我的旧时光：半生修行，一生怀念), with Yuan Tai Ji (圆太级)
