= Tiger Love (musical group) =

English synth pop duo

- Origin: London, England
- Genres: Synth pop
- Years active: 2008–present
- Members: Roy Ben Artzi; Gigi Ben Artzi

Tiger Love is a synth pop duo which was established in the early 2010s by brothers Roy Ben Artzi and Gigi Ben Artzi.

== History ==
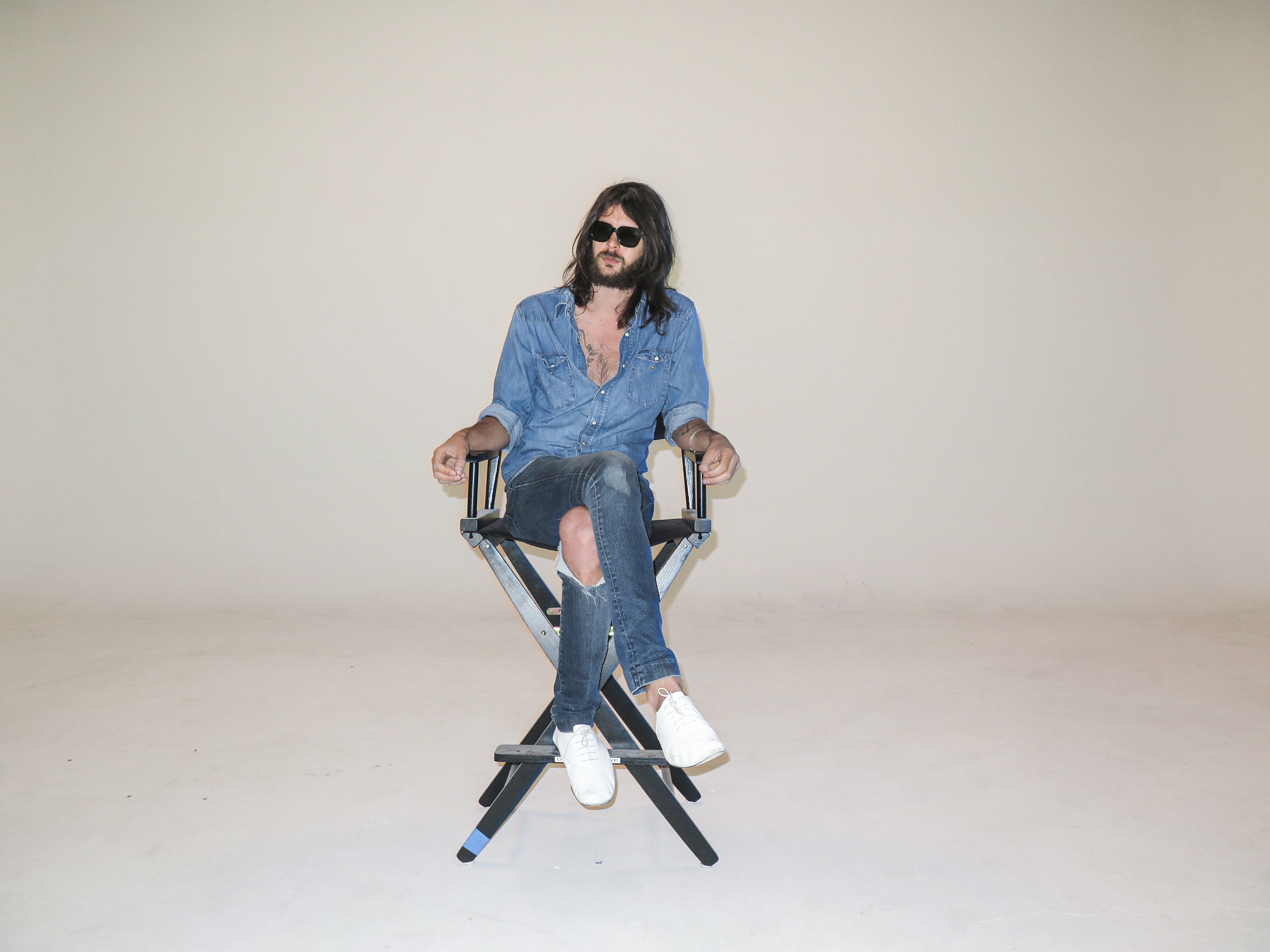
Gigi Ben Artzi during an interview, May 2016

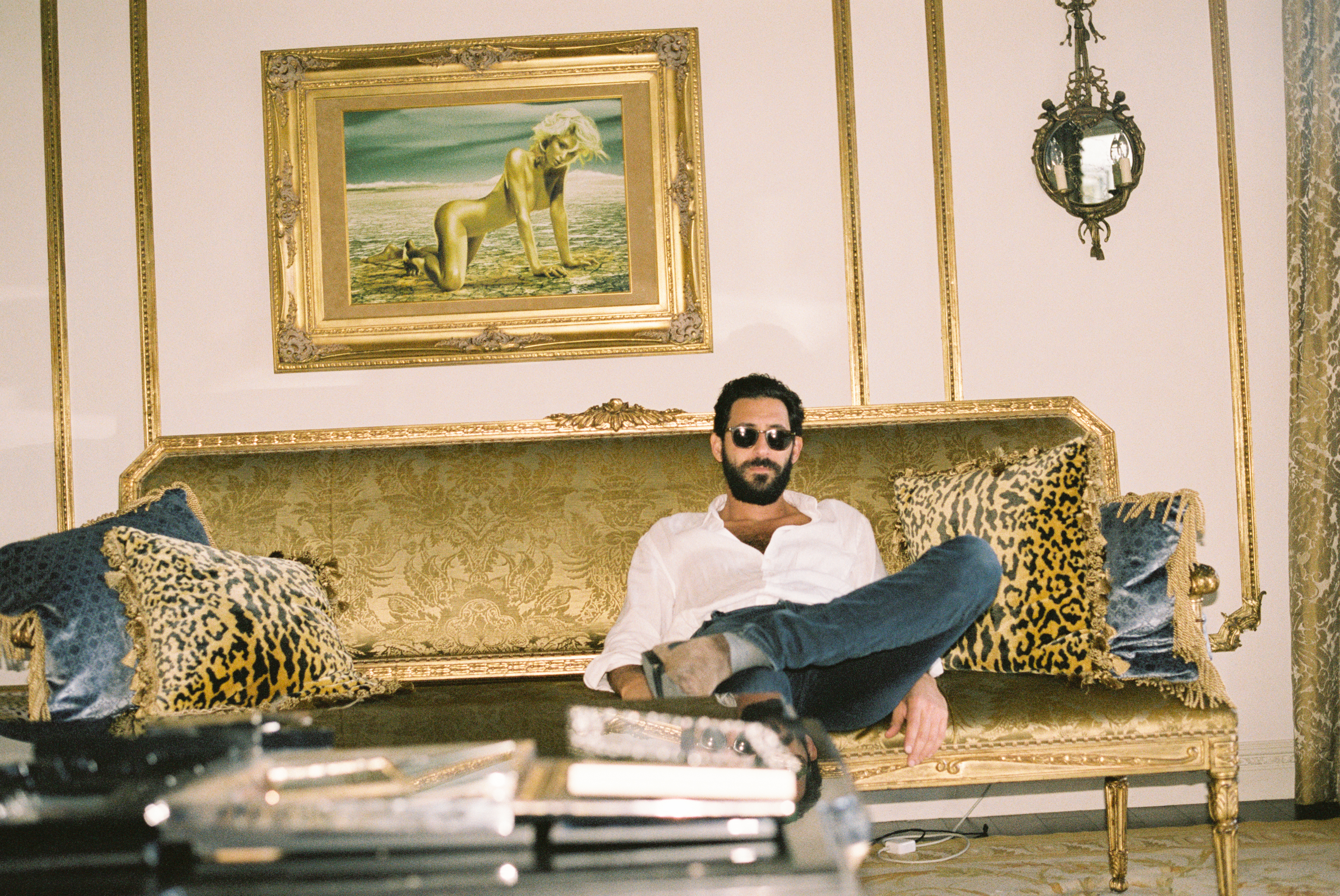
Roy Ben Artzi, May 2019

"Tiger Love" was established in the early 2008 by brothers Roy Ben Artzi and Gigi Ben Artzi. Gigi played bass, while his brother Roy played guitar and was the lead vocalist. The band's song "Pussy Cocaine" released in 2010 reportedly received hundreds of thousands of views and even made it to the top ten of the Hype Machine Music Chart. They have shared a stage with artists such as The Pet Shop Boys and Mark Ronson and were featured in The Guardian, Paper magazine and Fred Perry.

In 2016, they released their single "Space in Space". In the track's accompanying video, which was directed by both brothers, model and Instagram sensation Aliyah Galyautdinova is seen sexually pleasuring herself.

== Discography ==
=== Singles ===
- "Pussy Cocaine" (2010)
- "Summer Rain" (2012)
- "Space in Space" (2016)
- "See Smoke Sun" (2017)
