= Serafim Karalexis =

American film producer

Serafim Karalexis is a film producer. He began as an experimental filmmaker while attending Boston University's School of Fine and Applied Arts. He imported the film "I Am Curious (Yellow)" into the US, which eventually went to the US Supreme Court. BYRNE v. KARALEXIS [396 U.S. 976] He was responsible for Billy Joel going to the Soviet Union for concerts in Leningrad and Moscow as an HBO Special. He has produced and distributed over 30 films in the US.

== Filmography ==
- The Steal (1995) (associate producer)
- Anna Pavlova (1983) (associate producer)
- Death Promise (1977) (producer)
- The Super Weapon (1976) (producer)
- The Black Dragon's Revenge (1975) (executive producer)
- The Black Dragon (1974) (associate producer)
- The Real Bruce Lee (1973) (producer)
- I Am Curious Yellow (1967) (distributor)
- The Punk Rock Movie (1977) (associate producer)
- The Death of Bruce Lee (1975) (producer)
- Super Weapon (1980) (producer) Source:
