= Ninja the Mission Force =

- Cover of the Season 1 DVD
- Genre: Comedy, martial arts
- Created by: Megan Rachelle
- Developed by: Ed Glaser
- Written by: Megan Rachelle
- Starring: Ed Glaser; Brad Jones; Megan Rachelle; Jillian Zurawski; Sarah Lewis; Joshua Stafford; Peter Davis; Alex Mitchell; Brian Lewis; Ryan Mitchelle; Stuart Ashen; Allison Pregler (season 2)
- Country of origin: United States
- Original language: English
- No. of seasons: 2
- No. of episodes: 20

Production
- Production location: Champaign, Illinois
- Editor: Ed Glaser
- Production companies: Dark Maze Studios; Stoned Gremlin Productions

Original release
- Network: YouTube/Blip
- Release: February 15, 2012 – 2013

Ninja the Mission Force is a 2012 parody web series written by Meagan Rachelle, directed by Ed Glaser and produced by Dark Maze Studios. The series is a homage to the 1980s Z-grade ninja films of Godfrey Ho and was made by splicing original ninja footage into redubbed scenes from unrelated classic films in the public domain. It won a 2012 Telly Award for Comedy. A new season of NTMF was announced in 2013.

== Background ==
In 2012, director Ed Glaser decided to create a comedy web series based upon director Godfrey Ho's 1980s concept of using dubbed footage from existing ninja genre films to make and release new films. He shot ninja scenes which featured himself, and actors such as Brad Jones and Allison Pregler, and spliced his scenes together with scenes from public domain films cut and pasted to fit in with his newer plot concepts.

== Principal cast ==
- Brad Jones as Bruce (20 episodes, 2012–2013)
- Alex Mitchell as Ninja (18 episodes, 2012–2013)
- Meagan Rachelle (18 episodes, 2012–2013)
- Ed Glaser as Gordon (17 episodes, 2012–2013)
- Jillian Zurawski as Secretary (11 episodes, 2012–2013)
- Allison Pregler as Cheetah Lee (10 episodes, 2013)
- Joshua Stafford as Ninja Gordon (10 episodes, 2012)
- Sarah Lewis as Mrs. Gordon (8 episodes, 2012–2013)
- Ryan Mitchelle as Ninja (6 episodes, 2012–2013)
- Brian Lewis as Bamboozle (3 episodes, 2012–2013)

== Episodes ==
=== Season 1 (2012) ===
1. "Ninja Begininator" (February 15, 2012), uses footage from Laser Mission
2. "Ninja Godfather" (February 22, 2012), uses footage from The Invincible Gladiator
3. "Citizen Ninja" (February 29, 2012), uses footage from The Stranger
4. "'N' is for Ninja" (March 7, 2012), uses footage from Ninja Death
5. "Ninja Virus" (March 14, 2012), uses footage from The Boy in the Plastic Bubble
6. "Space Ninja in Space" (March 21, 2012), uses footage from Star Odyssey
7. "Ninja Exorcist" (March 28, 2012), uses footage from The Street Fighter
8. "Ninja Delivery" (April 11, 2012), uses footage from Cold Sweat
9. "Night of the Ninja" (April 18, 2012), uses footage from Night of the Living Dead
10. "Fists of Ninja" (April 25, 2012), uses footage from Planet of Dinosaurs

=== Season 2 (2013) ===
The second season was released exclusively on DVD, with the first episode available online.

1. Bruce Fights Back from the Grave
2. Bruce We Miss You
3. The Clones of Bruce
4. Image of Bruce
5. Bruce: A Dragon Story
6. They Call Him Bruce
7. The Real Bruce
8. Bruce's Greatest Revenge
9. Treasure of Bruce
10. Bruce the Invincible

=== Specials ===
- "Ninja the Mission Force Trailer" (February 8, 2012)
- "Ninja the Mission Force First Look" (February 13, 2012)
- "Godfrey Ho Star Andy Chworowsky Interview" (April 4, 2012)
- "Ninja Golden Telly" (June 21, 2012)
- "Behind the Scenes" (July 25, 2012)
- "NiMF on DVD August 7!" (July 30, 2012)
- "Ninja the Mission Force presents NINJA EMPIRE" (August 2, 2012)
- "Ninja the Mission Force: Now on DVD!" (August 6, 2012)
- "Save the Ninjas" (August 9, 2012)
- "Coming Feb. 8th - NiMF Riffs" (January 31, 2013)

== Critical reception ==
DVD Talk reviewed the second season and gave the series a mixed review, writing "humor is pretty subjective, so I won't insist that this show is terrible", and offered that "done well, the show could find a funny medium between What's Up, Tiger Lily? and The Lost Skeleton of Cadavra; sadly, this second season doesn't do much for me as a newcomer to the series. Despite some chintzy charm, the jokes are pretty limp, and the integration of the film footage plays out more like a budget booster than a source of creative comedy." And in their conclusion wrote "For those with a different comic sensibility than mine, this will be a light, kitschy romp through B-films."

DVD Verdict congratulated the series for winning a Telly Award during its second season. The reviewer stated he had not heard of the award, "but after some research, found it's awarded to exceptional online shows. So it's got that going for it." In criticism, he expanded "I was open-minded going in, but Ninja the Mission Force just isn't that funny. It's stupid, but stupid I will gladly take if you can make me laugh. Which it doesn't. Many of the jokes are heavy on pop culture references and come across as too contrived. The creative team shows earnestness in attempting to deliver a cult show that appeals to those seeking quick hit video humor on the Internet, but the legit laughs are too few and far between." They also noted problems with dubbing as "especially disappointing, since that would seem to be easier to pull off than anything else."

In a lengthy review, Impact Magazine reminds readers of the roots of director Godfrey Ho and producer Joseph Lai and IFD Films, and shared appreciation of Ed Glaser's web series created as an homage to their earlier works.

== Home media ==
The complete first season was released on the DVD, along with an exclusive "Ninja Christmas" episode.

The complete second season was released on DVD and includes the entire film Ninja the Protector.
