= J. Stewart Smith =

New Zealand fishing enthusiast (1913–2008)

Stewart Smith
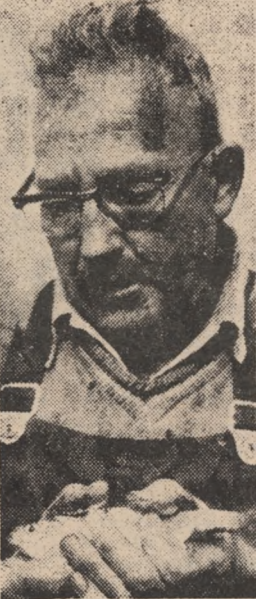
- Born: Joseph Stewart Smith; January 16, 1913; West Ham, London, England
- Died: 21 May 2008 (aged 95); Auckland, New Zealand

J. Stewart Smith (16 January 1913 – 21 May 2008) was an Englishman in New Zealand known for releasing several species of invasive freshwater fish into the country's waterways. A self-proclaimed Communist, Smith's goal was to introduce the coarse fishing of his childhood to New Zealand, which originally only had small native galaxias and introduced trout to fish for (which was something only the upper class could afford to do). Over the course of several decades, Smith would smuggle in fish and breed them in his garage in Massey, before releasing the offspring into rivers and lakes all over the North Island. Due to his actions, the ecology of New Zealand's freshwater ecosystems has been permanently altered.

== Early life ==
Joseph Stewart Smith was born in West Ham in London, England, in 1913, where he first started fishing in local canals and rivers at the age of five. During this time, New Zealand was experiencing a slowing birth rate and had acclimatisation programmes to bring young people from Britain to the country. In 1928, when Smith was fifteen years old, he and his younger brother were sent by their father to work on a farm in Auckland due to family poverty. He decided to quit farming after having to kill a dog that was stuck in a rabbit trap and bit him. During World War II, Smith was detained for four years in a prison camp for sympathising with the Soviet Union, where he was tasked with catching trout from the Tongariro River for the other prisoners.

After being released, Smith bought a garage in Massey and earned the nickname "Shotgun Smith" for defending it from robbers. It was in this garage where he set up a covert fish farm and started breeding fish to later release.

== Invasive species ==
Smith started his coarse fish campaign in the 1960s, when he captured European perch (a non-native fish already present in New Zealand) from Lake Rotoroa. The perch would be bred and then released throughout Auckland in waterbodies such as Lake Pupuke. In 1965, he managed to acquire tench and rudd which he would also breed and release.

By the end of his life, Smith would be responsible for helping to establish these fish species around New Zealand's North Island:

- European perch (Perca fluviatilis)
- Tench (Tinca tinca)
- Rudd (Scardinius erythrophthalmus)
- Common carp (Cyprinus carpio)
- Goldfish (Carassius auratus)
- Western gambusia (Gambusia affinis)

Smith also wanted to release pickerel but never got around to it. Not all of Smith's fish managed to establish themselves. Orfes (Leuciscus idus) were found in thirteen ponds around Auckland in 1985 and 1986 but have since been extirpated. Even in his old age he continued to seek opportunities to release non-native fish species into New Zealand. A raid by the Auckland City Council in 2005 found Australian smooth marron and Gudgeons (Gobio gobio) at his property and in ponds in Helensville. These were eradicated and seem to not be present in any other waterbodies despite Smith claiming that he released them in more places.

== Later life ==
Smith, who never married or had children, died on 21 May 2008 in Auckland. At least a portion of his estate was willed to coarse fishing clubs. Over the course of his project to introduce exotic fish species into New Zealand, he released 15,000 fish. His actions resulted irreversible changes to the ecosystems of many rivers and lakes in New Zealand.
