= Stuart Smith (actor) =

British actor

Stuart Onslow Smith (born 6 February 1959) is an English actor from Winchester, Hampshire.

After studying acting and playing a few parts in Sydney, Australia, he moved to Hong Kong and starred in over 20 films in the 1980s, including "ninja" flicks by Godfrey Ho. He also worked extensively as a voice actor, dubbing Chinese films into English.

He is particularly popular among bad film fans due to his starring and co starring roles in IFD and Filmark ninja chop suey films.

He is now an actor and voice over artist based out of Sydney.
