= The Way of the Dragon =

1972 Hong Kong film by Bruce Lee

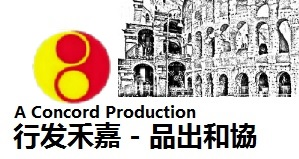
- Hong Kong theatrical release poster (Note: Poster cutout (logo))
- Traditional Chinese: 猛龍過江
- Simplified Chinese: 猛龙过江
- Literal meaning: Ferocious Dragon Crosses the River (Note: The title puns on Lee's native name Siu-Lung (小龍, "little dragon"), while "crossing the river" is an idiom meaning "to leave China.")
- Hanyu Pinyin: Měng Lóng Guòjiāng
- Jyutping: Maang5 Lung5 Gwo3 Gong1
- Directed by: Bruce Lee
- Written by: Bruce Lee
- Produced by: Raymond Chow; Bruce Lee; Riccardo Billi
- Starring: Bruce Lee; Nora Miao; Wei Ping-ou; Huang Tsung-hsing; Tony Liu; Unicorn Chan; Chuck Norris; Malisa Longo; Robert Wall; Hwang In-shik; Jon T. Benn; Riccardo Billi
- Cinematography: Tadashi Nishimoto (as Ho Lang-shan)
- Edited by: Peter Cheung
- Music by: Joseph Koo
- Production companies: Golden Harvest; Concord Production Inc.
- Distributed by: Golden Harvest
- Release date: 30 December 1972
- Running time: 100 minutes
- Country: British Hong Kong
- Languages: Mandarin; Cantonese; English
- Budget: US$130,000
- Box office: US$130 million

The Way of the Dragon (originally released in the United States as Return of the Dragon) is a 1972 Hong Kong martial arts comedy film co-produced and directed by Bruce Lee, who also stars in the lead role. This is Lee's only complete directorial film and the last one to be released during his lifetime, as he died seven months after its release. The film co-stars Nora Miao, Robert Wall, Wei Ping-ou and Chuck Norris in his first credited appearance.

The Way of the Dragon was released in Hong Kong on 30 December 1972, and the United States in August 1974. The film went on to gross an estimated US$130 million worldwide (equivalent to approximately $920 million adjusted for inflation), against a budget of $130,000. It was the highest-grossing Hong Kong film until Lee's next film, Enter the Dragon, in 1973.

The film is primarily set in a restaurant in Rome. The owners are being harassed by a local crime boss, and request help from a relative in Hong Kong. The help arrives in the form of a young martial artist. The conflict between the restaurant staff and the gangsters soon escalates.

== Plot ==
In Rome, Chen Ching-hua and her uncle Wang experience trouble with their restaurant from a crime boss who wants their property. When Chen refuses to give it up, the boss sends gangsters there to scare away the customers. Appealing to an uncle in Hong Kong, Chen receives help in the form of a young martial artist Tang Lung. On his first arrival, Tang is disoriented by his new surroundings and appears to be a country bumpkin. Disappointed, Chen asks what help he can be, but Tang confidently assures her that he is capable enough. At the restaurant, Tang learns that the staff have begun to learn karate, much to the annoyance of Quen, an employee who favors kung fu. Tang advises Quen to be open-minded and make use of anything that works.

Before long, the gangsters appear at the restaurant and threaten the customers away while Tang is using the bathroom. Upset by Tang's poor timing, the staff question his skill and the usefulness of his style. When the gangsters later return, the staff engage the thugs in a fight, only to be beaten. However, Tang single-handedly defeats them, causing the staff to decide to train under him. Uncle Wang warns them that the gangsters will seek revenge, but Tang vows to protect the restaurant. Chen and Tang grow closer and she takes him on a tour of Rome, though Tang is unimpressed by the city.

Ho, the crime boss's subordinate, returns with armed men and takes the restaurant staff hostage. Ho gives Tang a ticket to Hong Kong and tells him to go back. However, when his men escort Tang outside, Tang fights back and defeats the thugs with his two nunchakus, followed by the help of the restaurant staff. Tang warns Ho not to return and the thugs leave the restaurant. The staff celebrate their victory, but the gang boss threatens to have Tang killed unless he leaves by Chinese New Year. Uncle Wang urges Chen to convince Tang to leave. When Tang refuses to abandon the restaurant, an assassin tries to kill him from a nearby rooftop with a sniper rifle. Already fidgety from nearby fireworks, Tang survives the attempt. He then tracks down and defeats the assassin after tricking him into wasting his ammunition. When he returns to the apartment, he finds that Chen is gone. Assuming that Ho has kidnapped her, Tang goes to the boss' headquarters with the restaurant staff, defeating his men. Tang issues a final warning to the boss to leave the restaurant alone. The staff again celebrate, but a telegram for Tang cuts this short when they learn that he has been summoned back to Hong Kong. Tang assures them that he will not leave until the situation is resolved.

Ho hires two Japanese and European karate masters to challenge Tang, as well as a world-class martial artist named Colt. He then leads some of the restaurant staff to an isolated spot under the pretence of a truce, where the two martial artists ambush them. They initially defeat the staff until Tang intervenes. Ho lures Tang away to fight Colt at the Colosseum. Left behind, Uncle Wang knifes the two remaining members of the staff as he wants to sell the restaurant to the crime boss and return to Hong Kong as a rich man. In a decisive ten-minute battle of different fighting styles, Tang disables Colt and reluctantly kills him after Colt refuses an offer of mercy. Tang then chases after Ho out of the Colosseum. As Tang and Ho return to the ambush site, the mob boss arrives and shoots both Ho and Uncle Wang. Led by Chen, the police arrest the boss as he tries to kill Tang. With the matter finally resolved, Tang returns to Hong Kong, where Quen tells Chen that Tang is a loner who will never settle down.

== Cast ==
- Bruce Lee as Tang Lung (voiced by Chang Pei-Shan)
- Nora Miao as Chen Ching-hua
- Wei Ping-ou as Ho
- Huang Chung-hsin as Uncle Wang
- Tony Liu as Tony
- Unicorn Chan as Jimmy
- Tommy Chen as Thomas
- Chin Ti as Quen
- Wu Ngan as Waiter
- Robert Chan as Robert
- Chuck Norris as Colt (voiced by Jack Moore)
- Jon Benn as the boss (voiced by Ted Thomas) (uncredited)
- Robert Wall as Bob/Tom/Fred (voiced by Bruce Lee)
- Hwang In-shik as Japanese karateka
- Malisa Longo as Italian beauty
- Anders Nelsson as Thug (uncredited)
- Andre Morgan as Restaurant guest (uncredited)
- John Derbyshire appears in the film briefly as one of the mafia thugs.
- Riccardo Billi as Bank Manager (also associate as executive producer for the Rome location) (uncredited)

== Production ==
=== Development and writing ===
Bruce Lee formed his own production company, Concord Production Inc., with Golden Harvest founder Raymond Chow, and The Way of the Dragon was the company's first film. As well as acting as its producer, Lee also wrote the script, directed the film and played percussion on the soundtrack.

The film was originally intended as only for the Asian market, but was ultimately "responsible for maintaining the momentum of martial arts films in America". What makes it particularly memorable is the treatment of the fight in the Colosseum, with Chuck Norris making his film debut there. Lee filmed it "in long takes, framing it so that you could see their entire bodies. He used dramatic lighting, making both of them look larger-than-life."

== Reception ==
=== Box office ===
Prior to release, the film's initial tight budget of US$130,000 was already covered by pre-sales in Taiwan alone. Upon release, the film earned HK$5,307,350.50 at the Hong Kong box office, beating previous records set by Lee's own films, The Big Boss and Fist of Fury, and making it the highest-grossing film of 1972 in Hong Kong. The Way of the Dragon went on to gross HK$5.4 million, making it the highest-grossing film ever in Hong Kong up until then.

In the United States and Canada, the film received a wide release in August 1974, topping the North American box office charts. In New York City alone, the film opened with earnings of more than US$1,000,000 (equivalent to $6,500,000 in 2025) in its first five days. At Chicago's Oriental Theater, the film drew long queues before opening, setting an all-time theater record with 4,000 tickets sold within several hours of its opening. The film grossed $250,000 (equivalent to $1,600,000 in 2025) within two weeks of release at the Oriental Theater.

At two other Chicago theaters in Black neighbourhoods, the film earned $185,000 (equivalent to $1,210,000 in 2025) in its opening week. At a number of theaters, the film drew loud cheers from Black audiences like a prizefight, particularly during the climactic fight where audiences cheered on Lee as he fought Chuck Norris. Within a month of its release, the film earned nearly $4,000,000 (equivalent to $26,000,000 in 2025) in the United States. The film earned $5,200,000 (equivalent to $34,000,000 in 2025) in US distributor rentals during its initial run. With later re-releases, the film went on to gross a total box office revenue of $85 million in the United States.

In France, it became the eighth highest-grossing film of 1974 (below Enter the Dragon at No. 5 and above Fist of Fury at No. 12), with 4,002,004 ticket sales. In Spain, the film sold 2,345,259 tickets. In Germany, it was the 13th highest-grossing film of 1975, with 1.5 million ticket sales. In Japan, the film earned ¥772 million in distribution rentals, becoming the ninth highest-grossing film of 1975. In South Korea, the film sold 182,530 tickets in the capital city of Seoul. The film was also a commercial success in India when it released there in 1979. In one Bombay theater alone, New Excelsior, the film earned an estimated ₹1.204 million in its first eight weeks.

Against the film's final budget of $130,000, the film initially grossed US$50,000,000 (equivalent to $360,000,000 in 2025) worldwide, before increasing its gross to $85 million and then $100,000,000 (equivalent to $650,000,000 in 2025) by 1974. It eventually grossed an estimated total of $130 million (equivalent to approximately $920 million adjusted for inflation), earning 1,000 times its budget. It was the highest-grossing Hong Kong film up until Lee's next film, Enter the Dragon (1973).

=== Critical response ===
The Way of the Dragon was well received. Review aggregator Rotten Tomatoes reported an 88% approval rating based on 16 reviews. Upon release, Roger Ebert initially gave a mixed review in the Chicago Sun-Times, saying he found the plot simplistic and its conventions unbelievable but commented that "this sort of stuff is magnificently silly, and Lee, to give him credit, never tried to rise above it." Retrospective reviews have since been positive, with the film's comedy elements compared favourably to Charlie Chaplin and Jackie Chan, while the final fight between Bruce Lee and Chuck Norris is considered one of the greatest fight scenes of all time.

At the 11th Golden Horse Awards, it was judged a runner-up Best Feature Film and was recognised for Best Film Editing. Later on, it ranked No. 95 in Empire magazine's list "The 100 Best Films of World Cinema" in 2010. According to Gene Freese, the final fight between Lee and Norris is considered "by many to be the greatest movie fight ever" filmed. It has been listed as one of the greatest fight scenes of all time in a number of publications.

=== Legacy ===
During the fight scene between Bruce Lee and Chuck Norris, Lee demonstrated and popularized a technique that would later be called the oblique kick. This technique is frequently used by several modern mixed martial arts (MMA) fighters, most notably the UFC pound-for-pound champion Jon Jones, who cited Lee as an inspiration.

== Sequel ==
In 1978, following Lee's death, an exploitation sequel was released titled Way of the Dragon 2, starring Bruce Le and Bolo Yeung.

== See also ==
- Bruce Lee filmography
- Chuck Norris filmography
- List of Hong Kong films of 1972
