= Golden Dragon, Silver Snake =

1980 Hong Kong film by Godfrey Ho

- Film poster
- Directed by: Godfrey Ho; Kim Shi-hyeon
- Written by: Lee Jung-keun
- Produced by: Joseph Lai San-lun; Tomas Tang; Choe Chun-ji
- Starring: Dragon Lee; Kong Do
- Cinematography: Shin Myeong-ui; Shin Myung-yue; Tsin Yu
- Edited by: Kim Chang-sun; Vincent Leung
- Music by: Han Jin-guk
- Production companies: Yun Bang Films Co., Ltd.; Golden Media Group; Filmark International Ltd.; Asso Asia Films
- Release date: 1980
- Running time: 90 minutes
- Country: Hong Kong
- Language: Cantonese

Golden Dragon, Silver Snake is a 1980 Hong Kong martial arts film directed by Godfrey Ho, starring martial artist Dragon Lee and Kong Do.

== Cast ==
- Dragon Lee
- Kong Do
