= Tiger Love (1977 film) =

1977 Hong Kong film by Lin I-hsiu

- Directed by: Lin I-hsiu
- Produced by: Hui Keung
- Starring: Hu Chin; Lo Lieh; Wang Ya
- Narrated by: Hsiao Shyue-chen
- Cinematography: Li Shih-chieh
- Edited by: Wong Chui-kuai; Chiang Kuo-chuan
- Music by: Chen Yung-Yu
- Distributed by: Mill Creek Entertainment
- Release date: 1977
- Running time: 92 minutes
- Country: Hong Kong
- Languages: Cantonese; Mandarin

Tiger Love is a 1977 Hong Kong martial arts film produced by Kan Yeung Film Company.

In its theatrical and DVD releases, the film has gone under several different titles: Le Jeune tigre du kung fu (French), Kung Fu Zombie vs. Tigerkralle (German), Legend of the Tiger, The Tiger Love, Tiger's Kong Fu, Tiger's Love, Todesschrei der Tigerkralle (German), Ren Hu Lian (Cantonese), and Tiger Love. The film can be found on several martial arts film compilations produced by Mill Creek Entertainment.

== Plot ==
After eloping a young couple is confronted at the edge of a cliff by the bride's father who wishes her to marry her cousin. When she refuses the father's henchmen attack and overpower the husband Lin Xiaohou. Believing her husband to be dead the young woman, pregnant with her husband's child, throws herself off of the cliff. Landing in a tree branch, the woman, named Shi Shinlian survives the fall and awakes to find a tiger beneath the tree. The fright causes Shinlian to wet herself which she later discovers brings the tiger under her spell.

For twenty years Shinlian lives in the valley with the tiger and raises her son Xiaochang. Xiaochang learns a tiger-like style of martial arts. Watching him practice his mother realizes he is becoming a man and tells him the story of his father. Curious he returns to the village where he is confronted and attacked by the townspeople because of his strange leopard-skin clothing. After a short fight with several villagers he is confronted by a man that he discovers is his father.

When his father discovers his wife is still alive he goes with his new wife to the valley to invite her to return to the village. She states that she has become accustomed to life in the forest and cannot leave uncle tiger, but urges them to take Xiaochang so he can live among other people.

One day Xiaochang stumbles upon a tiger hunt by the Shi family, his mother's family and the sworn enemy of his father's family. Xiaochang jokingly ‘captures’ and becomes enchanted by his cousin, Xiaoling. She informs him to leave before he is seen by her family.

At a local restaurant Xiaochang overhears that the Shi family is having a party to celebrate the hunt and decides to go to see Xiaoling. Pulling her away from the crowd he reveals his feelings for her and she returns them but says their love is impossible because of the feud between their two families. Xiaoling's suitor in the Shi family then discovers the couple and starts a brawl with Xiaochang in which one Xiaoling's brother is killed.

Both Xiaochang and Xiaoling's families then forbid them to see one another again. Upon learning of the death in their family, the Shi's attack the Ling family in force killing several people including Xiaochang's father. This leads to a counterattack by Ling family in which several more people die.

When Shinlian goes to her family to try and stop the violence she is wounded by Xiaoling's suitor. Before she dies she tells her son he also a member of the Shi family and he must end the war.

Seeing Shinlian die uncle tiger kills a night watchman in anger. He reveals that for the past twenty years he had not killed, but that this is the one-hundredth person. He states that with this killing that when the moon is out he can transform into a demon in the shape of an old woman and hunt down the Shi family, which he proceeds to do.

In the end only Xiaochang and Xiaoling are left alive. They eventually kill uncle tiger by pouring boiling oil over his demon form.

== Cast ==
- Hu Chin
- Lo Lieh
- Wang Ya
- Hsia Chih-mo
- Stephen Tung.

== Reception ==
When looking at the 1980 DVD release, So Good Hong Kong DVD Reviews wrote that the opening scenes of Tiger Love were bordering on "perverse and disturbing" in its suggestion that Hu Chin was impregnated by a tiger, but that the film was then seen to be "nothing more than another martial arts entry" that was dull for its lack of decent choreography. The review finished by noting the director made the final 20 minutes more entertaining when a switch was made to a horror format as the "titular" tiger sought revenge.
