= Casanova Wong =

South Korean actor (born 1945)

Casanova Wong (Wang Ho in Korea)
- Born: Kim Yong-ho; October 14, 1952 (age 74); Iksan, North Jeolla Province, South Korea
- Other names: Ka Sat-fat (卡薩伐; Chinese stage name)
- Occupations: Actor; martial artist; film producer

Casanova Wong is a South Korean actor and martial artist.

A former member of a military taekwondo demonstration team, Wong is an expert in taekwondo and a leg fighter famous for his spin kicks. He earned the nickname "The Human Tornado" in the Republic of Korea Army.

He made many appearances in martial arts movies but is most remembered for his role as Cashier Hua in Warriors Two, where he starred alongside Sammo Hung, with whom he worked several times. Other films included Story of Drunken Master and Rivals of the Silver Fox. One of Wong's last notable movie appearances was as Kang-ho in the 1994 Korean movie Bloody Mafia.

== Later life ==
In 2005, he became president of the Korea Cheonji Martial Arts Association. He later worked as an instructor at the now-defunct Hanmin University in Nonsan, South Chungcheong Province, adjunct professor at Daegu Arts University in Chilgok County, North Gyeongsang Province, and member of the martial arts guidance committee of the Seoul Metropolitan Police Agency.

In a January 2023 interview with the MBC program Teukjong Sesang (Scoop World), he said he spent most of his assets on seven movies that disappointed at the box office, negatively affecting his family life. On why he lived alone at a Buddhist temple on a mountain, he said, "My two sons live separately. If I had a lot of money, my brothers would visit me but they don't because I don't have much money. I live with that feeling. I don't want to show myself like this."

He said he made seven films in 1984 and continued to make movies until 1995, selling his homes in Seoul and Hong Kong to finance his works since he had no income. He ended up losing everything and getting divorced. "When my sons were about 7 and before they entered elementary school, they had nobody to care for them so I moved them to their grandmother's house. (At the time) I couldn't see them often. When I went to the sticks for work, my kids lived without their parents and couldn't speak. It killed me inside."

Saying he has not given up on making another martial arts film, he added that he wishes to die either at a shooting location or a martial arts gym.

== Filmography ==
=== Films ===
This is a partial list of films.

- Gate of Destiny (1974)
- Secret Envoy (1976)
- The Martialmates (1976)
- The Shaolin Plot (1977) – Monk
- The Iron-Fisted Monk (1977) – Shaolin disciple
- Four Masters (1977)
- Golden Gate (1977)
- Righteous Fighter (1977)
- Enter the Invincible Hero (1977) – Master Pang
- Lone Shaolin Avenger (1978)
- The Legendary Strike (1978) – one of Yun's man
- Warriors Two (1978) – Cashier Wah
- Game of Death (1978) – Lau Yea Chun
- The Shaolin Fighter (1978) – See Pak
- Strike of Thunderkick Tiger (1978) – Monkey
- The Magnificent (1979) – Thunder Leg
- Duel of the 7 Tigers (1979)
- The Story of Drunken Master (1979) – Chi Wai
- Rivals of the Silver Fox (1979)
- Wonderman From Shaolin (1979)
- Avenging Boxer (1979) – Wo Pa Fong
- The Monk's Fight (1979) – the Big Boss
- My Kung Fu 12 Kicks (1979)
- The Master Strikes (1980) – Tseng Tien-tu
- Kung Fu Kids Break Away (1980) – Eagle
- Fire Lord (1980)
- The Wonderful Hong Kong (1980)
- Master Killers (1980)
- Game of Death II (1981) – Billy Lo's Korean challenger (Archive footage from GAME OF DEATH)
- Enter the Invincible Hero (1981) – Pang (Also footage from THE MAGNIFICENT)
- In the Claws of CIA (1981) – Johnny Wong
- Seven Finger Kung Fu (1981)
- Blow Up (1982) - Hung
- Bruce Lee Strikes Back (1982) – Cheng's Brother
- Jin hu men (1982)
- Warriors of Kung Fu (1982) – Yu Yung
- My Name is Twin Legs (1982)
- Sha shou ying (1982) – Johnny Wong
- Duel to the Death (1983, fights the flying ninjas)
- South Shaolin VS North Shaolin (1984)
- Rocky's Love Affairs (1985)
- Golden Destroyer (1985)
- Sword of Evil Power (1985)
- Kickboxer the Champion (1990)
- Telepathy Adventure (1991)
- Blues of Chongro (1994)
- Blood Mafia (1994)
- Faster (2003)
