= Godfrey Ho =

Hong Kong filmmaker (born 1948)

- Born: Ho Chi-keung; 10 November 1948 (age 77); Hong Kong
- Other names: Various; see aliases
- Occupations: Filmmaker; teacher
- Years active: 1974–2002

Chinese name
- Traditional Chinese: 何誌強
- Simplified Chinese: 何志强
Transcriptions
Standard Mandarin
- Hanyu Pinyin: Hé Zhìqiáng
Yue: Cantonese
- Jyutping: Ho^{4} Zi^{3}koeng^{4}

Godfrey Ho Chi-keung (Chinese: 何誌強; born November 10, 1948) is a Hong Kong retired filmmaker. He is believed to have directed more than one hundred films, including over 80 movies from 1980 to 1990 before his retirement in 2000. Many of his works are now regarded cult films by aficionados of Z movies as being among some of the most "so bad it's good" entertaining movies ever created.

== Life and career ==
Ho was born in 1948. He began his career as an assistant director for Chang Cheh at the Shaw Brothers Studio, during which time he worked alongside John Woo.

His first film was a low-budget production entitled Paris Killers in 1974. It was while working with Shaw Brothers where he met Joseph Lai. Together, they started IFD Films & Arts and ADDA Audio Video.

=== Cut-and-paste films ===
Through the 1980s and early 1990s Ho created a series of martial arts films made with a "cut-and-paste" technique, which means they were created with the help of splicing various unrelated material (including the recurring motif of ninja-themed scenes, often with little or no connection with the already disjointed plot) and dubbed together. Several of the films' titles are an amalgamation of the word "Ninja" and the title of an already existing movie, for example, The Ninja Force, Ninja The Protector, Full Metal Ninja, and Ninja Terminator. He would film footage for one micro-budget picture, and then edit and splice the shots together in a different order, adding in footage from the various Asian movies, and then dubbing over the result to create a final product. This allowed him to create several Z movies with the budget of one, though it is often difficult to discern how much of the finished product was actually filmed by his crew.

Godfrey Ho used American actor Richard Harrison extensively as the lead role in many of his films. Harrison, a European B movie star in the 1960s and 1970s, agreed to act in several of Ho's films in the early 1980s, although this footage was later spliced into many more of Ho's productions without his prior agreement; the damage done to his acting career by this association with Ho's films led Harrison to retire in 1990. Other noted actors appearing in Ho's productions include Stuart Smith, Edowan Bersmea, Gary Carter, and Pierre Kirby.

Ho's filmmaking also included uncredited and unauthorized use of music from Miami Vice, Fight! Iczer One, Kamen Rider Super-1, Star Trek, Star Wars, the Super Sentai franchise, Combat Mecha Xabungle, Kyojuu Tokusou Juspion, and Silent Running, and composed by Wendy Carlos, Vangelis, Pink Floyd, Tangerine Dream, Clan of Xymox, Hideki Matsutake, Steve Hillage, and Peter Schickele among others, as background score in his movies. The song "Just Like You" by Chris & Cosey was used without permission twice in the film Deadly Silver Ninja (1978) while "The Jet Set" by Alphaville was used during a fight scene in the film Untouchable Glory (1988).

The exact number of films directed and/or written by Ho is not known, even he is unsure on the subject and most of the films have been re-released under different names. A number of Ho's films were also later further re-edited by Joseph Lai into NINJA MYTH, a collection of 32 one-hour "Television Specials" released by IFD.

=== Other films ===
He also made some more mainstream movies, such as two martial arts films starring Cynthia Rothrock: Honor and Glory and Undefeatable (both released in 1993), two La Femme Nikita-inspired female assassin Lethal Panther films in 1990 and 1993, and Laboratory of the Devil, which was an unauthorized 1992 sequel/remake of Mou Tun Fei's 1988 WWII shock film Men Behind the Sun (further followed by Ho's Maruta 3 ... Destroy all Evidence in 1994, in which Ho reverted to extensively re-using old footage).

Godfrey Ho's last films to date were Manhattan Chase in 1999 (released in 2000), and the animated film Ali Baba & the Gold Raiders (released in 2002). As of 2010, he is now teaching at the Hong Kong Film Academy.

Ho appeared as a cameo actor twice, the first time in Siu-Pang Chan's The Magnificent in 1979 and again in his own Mr. X in 1995 (in the role of Godfather Ho). Godfrey's most recent credit is a cameo appearance in Scott McQuaid's Space Ninjas in 2019, where he plays a janitor. Director Scott McQuaid noted that his B movie title was inspired by Ho's 70's ninja films and he wanted to pay homage to his work, so he wrote a scene specifically for Ho to appear in.

== Aliases ==
Ho wrote and directed under different pseudonyms, and has been credited under more than 40 different names during the course of his career. In Chinese, Ho is known by two names, 何志强, and the less common 何致强.

Some of his purported pseudonyms include Godfrey Ho, Godfrey Hall, Benny Ho, Ho Chi-Mou, Charles Lee, Ed Woo, Stanley Chan, Ho Fong, Ho Jeung Keung and God-Ho Yeung.

== See also ==
- Ninja the Mission Force, an homage comedy web series.

== Bibliography ==
- Odham Stokes, Lisa; Braaten, Rachel (2020). Historical Dictionary of Hong Kong Cinema. Rowman & Littlefield. ISBN 9781538120620.
- Daniel R. Budnik (2017). '80s Action Movies on the Cheap: 284 Low Budget, High Impact Pictures. McFarland. ISBN 978-1476626871.
