= Hong Kong Legends =

UK DVD distributor

- The standard Hong Kong Legends DVD border strip. The image is a composite of stills, including Bryan Leung in Legend of a Fighter, Brigitte Lin in New Dragon Gate Inn, Jackie Chan in Drunken Master and Jet Li in Hitman, plus the company logo.
- Type: Subsidiary
- Industry: Video production and distribution
- Founded: 1999; 27 years ago
- Defunct: 2007; 19 years ago
- Key people: Bey Logan; Brian White
- Products: DVDs
- Parent: Medusa Communications (1999–2004); Contender Entertainment Group (2004–2007)

Hong Kong Legends was a United Kingdom DVD distribution company, based in Hertfordshire and operating from the UK and Australia between 1999 and 2007. Hong Kong Legends was initially part of Medusa Communications, who, along with Soulblade bought up the UK distribution rights for film titles previously owned by Eastern Heroes label.

Hong Kong Legends released 101 Hong Kong classic films, primarily martial arts films and other action films. In preparing the DVDs, they gained access to the vaults of Hong Kong studios such as Golden Harvest, selecting the films with the highest quality prints available. Hong Kong Legends also added audio commentaries, most notably by Hong Kong cinema expert Bey Logan, conducted interviews with key actors, directors and other film crew, performed new translations for subtitles and cleaned up damage to the films.

Their catalogue of films included releases featuring Hong Kong stars such as Bruce Lee, Jackie Chan, Sammo Hung, Yuen Biao, Jet Li, Chow Yun-fat, Donnie Yen and Michelle Yeoh. The company also issued special collector's edition versions of some of the films (such as The Big Boss), which included extra content such as trailers, commentaries and photo galleries.

== History ==
In 2004, Contender Entertainment Group purchased Medusa Communications, including both Hong Kong Legends, and their sister brand, Premier Asia.

Brian White, who had been the Brand Manager and prime mover of the label, left Contender. He was also a close personal friend of Bey Logan. Logan decided it was time to leave Contender as well and shortly afterwards moved to the US.

Harvey Weinstein would bring on board both Bey Logan & Brian White to begin working in a similar capacity for The Weinstein Company's East Asian DVD distribution company Dragon Dynasty, with White also serving as Vice-President of Asian Brand Management and Post Production.

With the loss of both Bey Logan & Brian White (Logan having done his popular commentaries; and White having created the exclusive extras), Contender had to cancel many of the planned Hong Kong Legends releases and as there was no attempt to bring in replacement staff to perform audio commentaries, or to create bonus features, the release schedule significantly dropped.

The directors of Medusa went on to start a new company, Showbox Media Group (which several years later launched the Cine-Asia label).

In September 2005, Contender entered into a co-operation pact with magazine / partwork publisher De Agostini to bring a selection of the more better known Hong Kong Legends titles, which were released as part of a fortnightly magazine giving facts and backgrounds on the featured film. The titles that were released included Fist of Fury, Drunken Master, Island of Fire, Once Upon a Time in China and The Killer. The series continued for 47 issues.

On 5 November 2007, Contender discontinued the Hong Kong Legends label after releasing the last few DVDs (which by then were released as Ultra Bit editions, implying DVDs with improved bitrates or in otherwise "special editions". In fact, the releases were significantly more basic, the company having lost the rights for additional features other than trailers, and the bitrate was no higher than their previous releases).

On 18 March 2011, Cine-Asia announced a revival of the Hong Kong Legends titles under the banner of Cine-Asia Presents Hong Kong Legends which were released under license from Entertainment One UK. The press release featured new artwork for The Big Boss, Fist of Fury, Game of Death, and Way of the Dragon.

== Releases ==
=== Films ===
- 2000 AD
- Armour of God
- The Avenging Fist
- Battle Creek Brawl
- Beast Cops
- A Better Tomorrow II
- The Big Boss
- The Blacksheep Affair
- Body Weapon
- Bullet in the Head
- A Chinese Ghost Story
- A Chinese Ghost Story II
- City Hunter
- City on Fire
- Crime Story
- Dragon Fist
- Dragon from Russia
- Dragon Lord
- Dragons Forever
- Dreadnaught
- Drunken Master
- Duel to the Death
- Eastern Condors
- Encounters of the Spooky Kind
- Enter The Dragon
- Executioners
- The Fearless Hyena
- First Option
- Fist of Fury
- Flaming Brothers
- Full Contact
- Game of Death
- Game of Death II
- Hand of Death
- Hapkido
- Heart of the Dragon
- Heroes Shed No Tears
- Heroic Trio
- Hitman
- Hong Kong 1941
- The Iceman Cometh
- In the Line of Duty
- Iron Fisted Monk
- Iron Monkey
- Island of Fire
- The Killer
- King of Beggars
- Knockabout
- Last Hurrah for Chivalry
- Legend of a Fighter
- Magnificent Bodyguards
- Magnificent Butcher
- Magnificent Warriors
- The Master
- Millionaire's Express
- Miracles
- Mr. Vampire
- Moon Warriors
- My Lucky Stars
- Naked Killer
- Naked Weapon
- New Dragon Gate Inn
- New Fist of Fury
- New Police Story
- Ninja in the Dragon's Den
- The Odd Couple
- Once a Thief
- Once Upon a Time in China
- Once Upon a Time in China II
- Once Upon a Time in China III
- Outlaw Brothers
- The Peacock King
- Peking Opera Blues
- Police Assassins
- Police Story
- Police Story 2
- The Postman Fights Back
- Prison On Fire
- Prison On Fire 2
- The Prodigal Son
- Project A
- Project A Part II
- The Protector
- Purple Storm
- Red Wolf
- Riki-Oh: The Story of Ricky
- The Scorpion King
- Seoul Raiders
- Seven Swords
- Sex and Zen
- Shaolin Wooden Men aka Shaolin Chamber of Death
- She Shoots Straight
- Skinny Tiger, Fatty Dragon
- Snake & Crane Arts of Shaolin
- Snake in the Eagle's Shadow
- Spiritual Kung Fu
- The Swordsman
- Tai Chi Boxer
- Tiger on the Beat
- Twinkle, Twinkle, Lucky Stars
- Warriors Two
- Way of the Dragon
- Wheels on Meals
- Wing Chun
- Winners and Sinners
- The Young Master
- Zu Warriors from the Magic Mountain

=== Documentaries ===
- An Introduction To Hong Kong Legends
- Bruce Lee: The Legend & Bruce Lee: The Man and the Legend
- Heromakers
- Jackie Chan: My Story / My Stunts

=== Box Sets ===
- Bruce Lee 30th Anniversary Commemorative
- The Donnie Yen Collection
- The Epic Action Collection
- The Fantasy Swordplay Collection
- The Jackie Chan Collection
- The Jackie Chan Project A Collection
- The Jet Li Collection
- The John Woo Collection
- Manga in Motion
- The Michelle Yeoh Collection
- The Police Story Double Disc Set
- Tsui Hark's Once Upon a Time in China Trilogy

=== 7 DVDs and Magazines ===
- Bruce Lee: The Intercepting Fist
- A Chinese Ghost Story III
- Executioners
- Heroic Trio
- Peking Opera Blues
- Prison on Fire
- Prison on Fire II

Release information taken from various sources, including the now defunct official Hong Kong Legends website, IMDB and online stores such as HKFlix.
