= Project A (film) =

1983 Hong Kong film by Jackie Chan

- Hong Kong theatrical poster

Chinese name
- Traditional Chinese: A計劃
- Simplified Chinese: A计划
Transcriptions
Standard Mandarin
- Hanyu Pinyin: "A" Jìhuà
Yue: Cantonese
- Jyutping: "A" Gai3 Waak6
- Directed by: Jackie Chan
- Written by: Jackie Chan; Edward Tang
- Produced by: Raymond Chow; Leonard Ho; Edward Tang
- Starring: Jackie Chan; Sammo Hung; Yuen Biao; Dick Wei; Lee Hoi-san; Mars
- Cinematography: Cheung Yiu Tsou
- Edited by: Peter Cheung
- Music by: Michael Lai
- Distributed by: Golden Harvest; Media Asia Group
- Release date: 22 December 1983
- Running time: 105 minutes
- Country: Hong Kong
- Language: Cantonese
- Box office: US$18 million (est.)

Project A
- Traditional Chinese: A計劃
- Simplified Chinese: A计划
Transcriptions
Standard Mandarin
- Hanyu Pinyin: "A" jìhuà
- Wade–Giles: "A" Chi-hua
Yue: Cantonese
- Yale Romanization: "A" Ji hwa
- Jyutping: "A" Gai3 Waak6

Project A (Chinese: A計劃; Jyutping: A Gai3 Waak6; fully titled as Jackie Chan's Project A) is a 1983 Hong Kong martial arts action comedy film starring and directed by Jackie Chan, who also wrote the screenplay with Edward Tang, who produced with Leonard Ho and Raymond Chow. The film co-stars Sammo Hung and Yuen Biao. Project A was released theatrically in Hong Kong on 22 December 1983.

The film is also known in West Germany as both Piratpatrullen and Der Superfighter marketed next to Der Superfighter III (The Fearless Hyena) and Der Superfighter II (Fearless Hyena Part II). The Philippines also released the film under the title Superfly 2 and marketed it next to Superfly (Armour of God II).

Set around 1911 in old Hong Kong, Project A blends martial arts with comedy moments and spectacular stunts. One stunt in particular involved Chan hanging and falling from the hand of a clock tower some 60 ft (18 m) high, tearing through awning canopies before hitting the ground, a stunt he performed three times as he was unhappy with the first two.

The film was a box office success in East Asia. At the 4th Hong Kong Film Awards, Chan received two nominations for the film (and another for Wheels on Meals), including his first Best Actor nomination, and won his first Best Action Choreography award. A sequel, Project A Part II, was released in 1987.

== Plot ==
In the late 19th century, Sergeant Dragon Ma is part of the Hong Kong Marine Police's effort to combat pirates, who have been raiding ships for months. Members of the Hong Kong Police Force and the Marine Police, who have strong inter-service rivalries, get into a fight in a bar. Shortly after this, Captain Chi releases all of the sailors to their commanding officer, and two of the Marine Police's ships get blown up.

Gangsters Chiang and Mr. Chou meet at a VIP Club and discuss fleeing to Vietnam. As soon as Chiang leaves, he meets one of the pirates and they laugh about sabotaging the Marine Police ships. The pirate tells Chiang that his boss, San Pao wants 100 police rifles.

Dragon Ma and his squad are forced to become regular police officers. They have to undergo "hard training" with the police under Captain Chi's nephew, Hong Tin-tsu. After the police learn that Chiang is at the VIP Club, and that the guests there are not to be disturbed, Dragon and Tin-tsu go to arrest Chiang. A big fight breaks out. Tiring of the blatant corruption in the police force, Dragon arrests Chiang outright and tells Tin-tsu to take the credit. That is his last official act as an officer with the Hong Kong police.

Fei finds Dragon in the street. They have a conversation and Fei reveals that someone in the police force is selling rifles. Fei tells Dragon that all he wants are the guns, and Dragon can catch the traitor. At night, Dragon and Fei interrupt a gun deal between the Army and the police Captain. After pushing everyone into the water and making off with the guns, Fei hides the rifles inside a log and marks it with a red flag. He later tries to sell the guns to the gangsters and pirates, but Dragon has removed Fei's red flag and put flags on other logs instead.

Having thwarted Fei's plan to sell the rifles to the pirates, Dragon has a conversation with the Admiral's daughter, Winnie. He learns that the Captain wasn't smuggling rifles for San pao, he was buying the rifles from the army to arm his men. Overhearing this, Fei gets into an argument with Dragon. The gangsters come after Fei, and he tells them that Dragon is to blame for the missing rifles. Dragon is forced to flee with Winnie. After teaming up with Fei, being tortured for information about the rifles, and falling from the face of a clock tower, Dragon is tracked down by the police for a third time, and they help him get away as they arrest the gangsters.

Having lost the rifles, the pirates take a ship hostage, the passengers including a Rear Admiral. Mr. Chou proposes an arms-for-hostages deal and the Colonel consents. Having overheard the conversation, Dragon confronts the Colonel and convinces him that the gangsters and the pirates will never fear the law if the police force are corrupt. It is agreed that Dragon will assume all responsibility for the mission to save the hostages, and the Colonel allows the Marine Police to be brought back into full force.

Mr. Chou is brought in by the police and beaten until he tells Dragon and Tin-tsu how to get to San Pao. Dragon, posing as Mr. Chou, gets on board a ship that takes him to San Pao's hideout, and they are followed by the rest of the squad. Fei sneaks aboard and poses as a pirate. After a lot of tricky undercover work, the cavalry arrives, and there is a final confrontation in the middle of the pirate's lair. Dragon, Tin-tsu, and Fei engage in a hand-to-hand battle with San Pao, eventually killing him with a hand grenade when he's rolled into the carpet. After the battle, they sail a raft to take the hostages back to Hong Kong.

== Cast ==
- Jackie Chan - Sergeant Dragon Ma Yue Lung
- Sammo Hung - Zhuo Yifei aka Fei / Fats
- Yuen Biao - Inspector Hong Tin-tzu (Captain Chi's Nephew)
- Kwan Hoi-san - Captain Chi
- Dick Wei - Pirate Chief Lor Sam Pau / San Pao (羅三砲)
- Lee Hoi-san - Mr. Lee Cho-kou
- Mars - Big Mouth / Jaws
- Isabella Wong (Wong Man-ying / Winnie Wong) - Winnie Shih
- Tai Bo - Tai Bo
- Lau Hak-suen - Admiral Shih
- Wong Wai - Chou Wing Ling
- Hon Yee-sang - Chiang
- Ng Min-kan - Pirate
- Kwan Yung-moon - Pirate
- Chan Chi-fai - Pirate / Policeman
- Law Ho-kai - Club Manager
- Cheung Ng-long - Assistant At Club
- Wan Faat - Assistant At Club
- Wu Ma - Mahjong player
- Lai Keung-kuen - Coast Guard
- Danny Chow - Ling's thug
- Johnny Cheung - Ling's thug
- Lola Forner - British Admiral's Daughter
- Chris Li - Pirate
- Sam Wong - Pirate
- To Wai-wo as Policeman
- Chin Kar-lok - Police Coast Employee (extra)
- Steve Mak (extra)
- Frankie Poon (extra)
- A. Chau (extra)
- Rocky Lai
- Nicky Li

Isabella Wong is the only female actress with a substantial role in this film. She has film credits for cameo appearances in the sequel Project A Part II and in Police Story 2.

== Title ==
In the 1980s, Chan chose vague, generic film titles such as Project A and Police Story so as not to give the plots of the films away prior to their release. It was felt that the titles of previous Chan films such as Snake in the Eagle's Shadow and Drunken Master gave too much away about the kung fu style they featured (Snake Style and Drunken Fist respectively). Project A was originally going to be titled Pirate Patrol, but it was feared that once announced, other Hong Kong film producers would rush to copy and release films featuring pirates.

== Production ==
On the audio commentary of the Hong Kong Legends (Region 2) DVD, Bey Logan reveals that Chan's last period film, Dragon Lord (1982), had under-performed at the Hong Kong box office in comparison to the previous one, The Young Master (1980). Logan identifies that a possible reason for the poor performance was the comparative lack of action. Edward Tang and the production team felt that a period film could still have success if it had sufficient action, and so researched the history of Hong Kong during the time of pirates for Project A.

Unlike other Hollywood period films that are set on an exact time and place, many Hong Kong films play fast and loose with their period in history. A prominent example by Bey Logan is set like this: the Hong Kong Marine Police is set up in 1846 by the British Colonial Government. The Hong Kong Headquarters is set up in 1884. The Kowloon Canton Railway Clock tower is set up in 1915. In other words, this film takes place between the 19th and early 20th century. Jackie and the Golden Harvest team employ some researchers to come up with background for this story about pirates in Hong Kong and are not really concerned at all about depicting the film in the exact era.

Project A marks the first time that veteran Michael Lai used orchestral music for a film score, instead of using library music or lifting the score from other films.

In rehearsal for the clock tower fall, Chan took a week to build the courage to drop from such a great height. During the shooting of the bicycle chase sequence, one of the stuntmen informed Chan that E.T. the Extra-Terrestrial was playing at the local cinema. Chan halted filming to watch the bicycle chase scene in the finale of E.T., to ensure that his scene and Steven Spielberg's scene were not the same. After watching the film, Chan became more confident, realizing that the audience doesn't really care so much about such minor details, only in watching the film and having a good time. According to his book I Am Jackie Chan: My Life in Action, Chan injured his neck while filming the scene.

After appearing in The Cannonball Run (1981), Chan liked the idea of including bloopers over the closing credits. Beginning with Dragon Lord, he has included (and directed) outtakes over the end credits for most of his films, including Project A, and they have become something of a Chan trademark. Due to the nature of his films, Chan's outtakes are a combination of comedic moments and injuries sustained whilst he and his team perform stunts and fight sequences. These outtakes were enjoyed particularly by audiences in Japan—so much so that Japanese film companies would demand the inclusion of "NGs" ("no good" shots) in the distribution contracts for all Jackie Chan films, regardless of director.

While some of Chan's comedy stunt work in Project A has similarities to the comedy stunt work of Buster Keaton and Harold Lloyd, Chan had not seen their films at the time, as they were not available on home video. According to Chan, Project A was an evolution of the action stunt work he had already been doing in earlier kung fu comedy films since The Young Master (1980). He only became aware of Keaton later from Western critics who watched Project A and drew comparisons, after which Chan watched Keaton's films when they eventually became available on home video and realized how similar Keaton is to himself.

== Release ==
Project A was released in Hong Kong on 22 December 1983. In the Philippines, the film was originally released as Mark of the Dragon, but First Films later rereleased it as Superfly 2 on 17 September 1992, connecting it to the unrelated film Armour of God II: Operation Condor (released as Superfly).

=== Box office ===
Project A (along with Dragon Lord) marked Chan's return to Asian cinema after his first attempt to break into the Hollywood market with a small role in The Cannonball Run and a starring role in the commercially disappointing Battle Creek Brawl. In contrast, Project A was a huge success at the Hong Kong box office, earning HK$19,323,824 (US$2,659,852).

It was also very well received abroad, and particularly throughout East Asia. Reportedly, in Japan, Emperor Showa's fondness of the film and eagerness to see a sequel led Chan to make Project A Part II. At the Japan box office, Project A grossed ¥2.95 billion (US$12.42 million), becoming one of the top three highest-grossing foreign films of 1984 (along with another Jackie Chan starrer Cannonball Run II) and the year's sixth highest-grossing film overall.

In Taiwan, it was one of the top five highest-grossing films of 1984, with 369,914 admissions grossing NT$24,170,723 (US$611,777). In South Korea, it was the highest-grossing film of 1984 with 396,436 ticket sales, grossing an estimated ₩1,189,308,000 (US$1,475,612). In France, the film sold 200,498 tickets in 1988, equivalent to an estimated €741,843 (US$877,229). Combined, the film grossed an estimated total of approximately US$18,044,470 (equivalent to $58,000,000 in 2025) in Asia and Europe.

=== Critical reception ===
Project A was met with positive reviews. In his annual film guide, Leonard Maltin's Movie Guide, Maltin rated the film 3 out of 4 stars. The film was praised by the Los Angeles Times.

The film has an 81% approval rating on Rotten Tomatoes, based on 13 reviews.

== Accolades ==
- 1985 Hong Kong Film Awards
  - Won: Best Action Choreography
  - Nominated: Best Actor (Jackie Chan)

== Other media ==
The video game Project A (プロジェクトA) is a tie-in for the movie. It was developed and published by Pony Canyon for the MSX, MZ-80B, PC-6001, and PC-88 home computer lines.

== See also ==
- Jackie Chan filmography
- List of Hong Kong films
- List of Hong Kong films of 1983
- Sammo Hung filmography
- Yuen Biao filmography
- Project A-ko
