= Jackie Chan filmography =

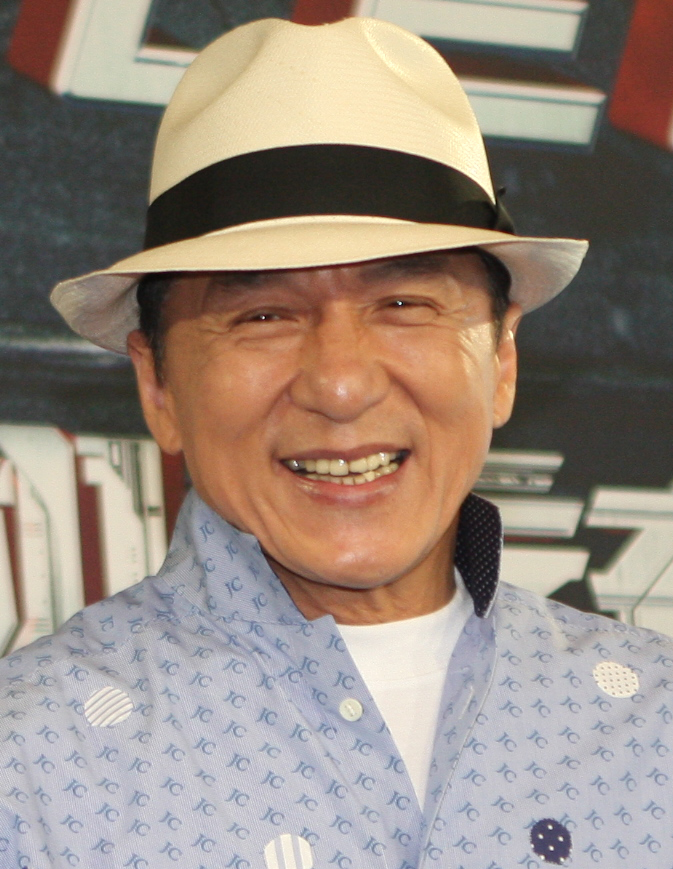
Chan in July 2016

Jackie Chan began his film career as an extra child actor in the 1962 film Big and Little Wong Tin Bar. Ten years later, he was a stuntman opposite Bruce Lee in 1972's Fist of Fury and 1973's Enter the Dragon. He then had starring roles in several kung fu films, such as 1973's Little Tiger of Canton and 1976's New Fist of Fury. His first major breakthrough was the 1978 kung fu action comedy film Snake in the Eagle's Shadow, which was shot while he was loaned to Seasonal Film Corporation under a two-picture deal. He then enjoyed huge success with similar kung fu action comedy films such as 1978's Drunken Master and 1980's The Young Master. Jackie Chan began experimenting with elaborate stunt action sequences in The Young Master and especially Dragon Lord (1982).

1983's Project A saw the official formation of the Jackie Chan Stunt Team and established Chan's signature style of elaborate, dangerous stunts combined with martial arts and slapstick humor, a style he further developed in a more modern setting with 1984's Wheels on Meals and notably 1985's Police Story, which contained numerous large-scale action scenes and is considered one of the best action films of all time. Chan continued his style of slapstick martial arts mixed with elaborate stunts in numerous other films, such as: the Police Story sequels, the Armour of God series, Project A Part II (1987), Dragons Forever (1988), Twin Dragons (1992), City Hunter (1993), and Drunken Master II (1994), among others. Rumble in the Bronx (1995) made Jackie Chan a mainstream celebrity in North America, leading to a successful Hollywood career with the Rush Hour and Shanghai series. In 2000, Chan produced an animated series Jackie Chan Adventures, which ran until 2005. In 2010, Jackie Chan appeared in his first dramatic role in an American film, The Karate Kid. In 2017, the Chinese-Indian co-production Kung Fu Yoga became his highest-grossing film in China. As of 2021, Jackie Chan has appeared in nearly 150 films.

At the box office, ten of his films earned nearly US$200,000,000 (equivalent to $600,000,000 in 2025) worldwide between 1985 and 1989. By the mid-1990s, he had become the most popular action movie star in Asia and Europe, with at least 20 films (out of 40 films) up until then, earning him a net income of $5 million per film. In East Asia, his films collectively grossed HK$1.14 billion (US$146 million) in Hong Kong between 1973 and 2010, ¥48.4 billion (US$607 million) in Japan between 1979 and 2012, and over US$72 million in South Korea between 1991 and 2010, while topping the Taiwan box office ten times between 1982 and 1994. In Europe, his films collectively sold about 84 million tickets between 1973 and 2010. As of 2021, his films have grossed over CN¥14 billion (US$2.17 billion) in China, and US$1.84 billion (more than US$2.44 billion adjusted for inflation) in the United States and Canada. As of 2018, 48 of his films listed by The Numbers have grossed more than US$5 billion at the worldwide box office.

== As actor ==
Year	Title	Credited as		Role	Notes	Ref.
Year	Title	Actor	Producer	Role	Notes	Ref.
1962	Big and Little Wong Tin Bar	Yes	No	Child		
1963	The Golden Hairpin	Yes	No	Child		
1964	Liang Shan Po and Chu Ying Tai	Yes	No	Child		
1964	The Story of Qin Xiang Lin	Yes	No	Child		
1966	The Eighteen Darts (Part 1)	Yes	No	Kid		
1966	The Eighteen Darts (Part 2)	Yes	No	Kid		
1969	The Magnificent Monk	No	No	—N/a	As writer	
1970	Lady of Steel	Yes	No	Beggar Kid		
1971	The Blade Spares None	Yes	No	Enemy		
1971	The Angry River	Yes	No	Guard		
1971	A Touch of Zen	No	No	—N/a	Stuntman Only	
1972	Fist of Fury	Yes	No	Jing Wu's Student		
1972	Hapkido	Yes	No	Black Bear's Student		
1972	The Black Tavern	Yes	No	Official Hai's Servant		
1972	The Brutal Boxer	Yes	No	Thug		
1972	The Bloody Fists	Yes	No	Japanese Policeman		
1972	Game of Death	No	No	Hai Tien's Fan	In scripts only	
1972	Stranger from Hong Kong	Yes	No	—N/a	Cameo	
1973	Enter the Dragon	Yes	No	One Of Han's Prison Security Guards	Also Stuntman	
1973	Facets of Love	Yes	No	Xiao Liu	Cameo	
1973	Not Scared to Die	Yes	No	Si To / Shi Tzer	Cameo	
1973	Police Woman	Yes	No	Gang Leader		
1973	Kung Fu Girl	Yes	No	Japanese Thug		
1973	Little Tiger of Canton	Yes	No	Hsiao Hu		
1973	Chinese Hercules	Yes	No	Thug	Uncredited extra	
1973	Ambush	Yes	No	Extra	Uncredited	
1973	The Awaken Punch	Yes	No	Stuntman	Uncredited	
1973	Fist of Unicorn	Yes	No	Stuntman	Uncredited	
1973	Fist to Fist	Yes	No	Stuntman	Uncredited	
1973	Supermen Against the Orient	Yes	No	Extra		
1974	The Golden Lotus	Yes	No	Brother Yun		
1974	Village of Tigers	Yes	No	Bandit		
1974	The Young Dragons	No	No	—N/a	Action director and martial arts choreographer only	
1975	All in the Family	Yes	No	Hsiao Tang		
1975	Flatfoot in Hong Kong	Yes	No	Beijing Opera Thug	Uncredited	
1975	No End of Surprises	Yes	No	Secretary Chen		
1975	The Golden Lion	Yes	No	Golden Lion Gang Member		
1975	The Hand of Death	Yes	No	Little Tan		
1976	The Himalayan	Yes	No	Tseng's Men		
1976	New Fist of Fury	Yes	No	Ah Lung		
1976	The Killer Meteors	Yes	No	Immortal Meteor Wa Wu Bin		
1976	Shaolin Wooden Men	Yes	No	Tiger / Little Mute		
1976	The Private Eyes	No	No	—N/a	Stuntman only	
1977	The 36 Crazy Fists	No	No	—N/a	Stunt coordinator and action director only	
1977	To Kill with Intrigue	Yes	No	Lei Shao Feng		
1977	The Face Behind The Mask	Yes	No	Masked Fighter	Uncredited	
1978	Snake in the Eagle's Shadow	Yes	No	Chien Fu		
1978	Snake & Crane Arts of Shaolin	Yes	No	Hsu Yin Fung		
1978	Magnificent Bodyguards	Yes	No	Lord Ting Chung		
1978	Half a Loaf of Kung Fu	Yes	No	Master Jiang		
1978	Drunken Master	Yes	No	Wong Fei Hung / Freddie		
1978	Spiritual Kung Fu	Yes	No	Yi Lang		
1978	Two in Black Belt	Yes	No	Cameo		
1979	The Fearless Hyena	Yes	No	Shing Lung	Directioral debut	
1979	Dragon Fist	Yes	No	Tang Huo Wan		
1979	Dance of Death	No	No	—N/a	Stuntman, stunt coordinator and action director only	
1979	Immortal Warriors	No	No	—N/a	Action director and stunt coordinator only	
1979	Fists and Guts	Yes	No	Brief appearance		
1979	Master with Cracked Fingers	Yes	No	Ah Lung / Jackie		
1980	The Young Master	Yes	No	Dragon / Master Lung	Also director	
1980	Battle Creek Brawl	Yes	No	Jerry Kwan	Hollywood debut	
1980	Read Lips	No	Yes	—N/a		
1981	The Cannonball Run	Yes	No	Subaru Leone 4WD Driver	Cameo	
1981	The Gold-Hunters	No	Yes	—N/a		
1982	Dragon Lord	Yes	No	Dragon Ho / Lung	Also director	
1983	Fantasy Mission Force	Yes	No	Sammy		
1983	Fearless Hyena II	Yes	No	Chan Lung / Stone		
1983	Winners and Sinners	Yes	No	CID 07 / Cop #7086		
1983	Project A	Yes	No	Sgt. Dragon Ma / Yue Lung	Also director	
1984	Wheels on Meals	Yes	No	Thomas		
1984	Cannonball Run II	Yes	No	Mitsubishi Engineer		
1984	Pom Pom	Yes	No	Motorcycle Cop #2	Cameo	
1985	My Lucky Stars	Yes	No	Muscles		
1985	The Protector	Yes	No	Billy Wong		
1985	Twinkle, Twinkle, Lucky Stars	Yes	No	Muscles		
1985	Heart of Dragon	Yes	No	Tat Fung / Ted		
1985	Police Story	Yes	No	Chan Ka Kui / Kevin Chan	Also director	
1986	Naughty Boys	Yes	Yes	Prisoner	Cameo	
1986	Armour of God (Operation Condor)	Yes	No	Jackie Condor / Asian Hawk	Also director	
1987	Project A II	Yes	No	Dragon Ma	Also director	
1987	That Enchanting Night	No	Yes	—N/a		
1988	Police Story 2	Yes	No	Chan Ka Kui / Kevin Chan	Also director	
1988	Dragons Forever	Yes	No	Jackie Lung		
1988	The Inspector Wears Skirts	No	Yes	—N/a		
1988	Rouge	No	Yes	—N/a		
1988	Painted Faces	No	No	—N/a	Biography	
1989	Miracles	Yes	No	Charlie Cheng Wah Kuo / Kuo Chen Wah	Also director	
1989	The Inspector Wears Skirts II	No	Yes	—N/a		
1989	I Am Sorry	Yes	No		Presenter	
1990	The Outlaw Brothers	No	No	—N/a	Action director only	
1990	Stage Door Johnny	No	Yes	—N/a		
1990	Story of Kennedy Town	No	Yes	—N/a		
1991	Island of Fire	Yes	No	Steve Tong / Da Chui		
1991	A Kid from Tibet	Yes	No	Airport passenger	Cameo	
1991	Armour of God II: Operation Condor	Yes	Yes	Jackie Condor	Also director	
1991	Angry Ranger	No	Yes	—N/a		
1991	Beauty and the Beast	Yes	No	Beast (voice)	Mandarin dub	
1991	Center Stage	No	No	—N/a	Presenter only	
1992	Supercop	Yes	No	Chan Ka Kui / Kevin Chan		
1992	Twin Dragons	Yes	No	Ma Yau / Bok Min		
1992	The Shootout	No	Yes	—N/a		
1993	Supercop 2	Yes	No	Chan Ka Kui / Inspector Chan	Cameo	
1993	City Hunter	Yes	No	Ryo Saeba / Michael Martin City Hunter		
1993	Crime Story	Yes	No	Inspector Eddie Chan	Uncredited co-director	
1994	Drunken Master II	Yes	No	Wong Fei Hung	Uncredited co-director	
1995	Thunderbolt	Yes	No	Chan Foh To / Alfred Tung		
1995	Rumble in the Bronx	Yes	No	Ma Hon Keung		
1996	First Strike	Yes	No	Chan Ka Kui / Jackie		
1997	Mr. Nice Guy	Yes	No	Jackie		
1997	Understanding Time and Space	Yes	No	Webcam partner	Guest appearance	
1997	An Alan Smithee Film: Burn Hollywood Burn	Yes	No	Himself	Cameo	
1998	Who Am I?	Yes	No	"Who Am I?"	Also director	
1998	Rush Hour	Yes	No	Chief Inspector Lee		
1998	Hot War	No	Yes	—N/a		
1998	Mulan	Yes	No	Captain Li Shang (voice)	Cantonese & Mandarin dub	(Note: Cantonese and Mandarin dub versions)
1999	King of Comedy	Yes	No	Actor	Cameo	
1999	Gorgeous	Yes	Yes	C.N. Chan		
1999	Gen-X Cops	Yes	No	Fisherman	Cameo	
2000	Shanghai Noon	Yes	Yes	Chon Wang		
2000	Dragon Heat	Yes	No	Himself	Cameo	
2000	Gen-Y Cops	No	No	—N/a	Presenter only	
2001	The Accidental Spy	Yes	Yes	Buck Yuen		
2001	Rush Hour 2	Yes	No	Chief Inspector Lee		
2002	The Tuxedo	Yes	No	Jimmy Tong / Clark Devlin		
2003	Shanghai Knights	Yes	No	Chon Wang		
2003	Vampire Effect	Yes	No	Jackie Fong	Cameo	
2003	The Medallion	Yes	No	Eddie Yang		
2004	Enter the Phoenix	Yes	No	Mr. Chan	Cameo	
2004	Around the World in 80 Days	Yes	Executive	Passepartout / Lau Xing		
2004	The Twins Effect II	Yes	No	Lord Of Armour / General Wai Shing	Cameo	
2004	New Police Story	Yes	No	Chan Ka Kui / Chan Kwok Wing		
2004	Rice Rhapsody	No	Executive	—N/a		
2005	The Myth	Yes	No	General Meng Yi / Jack		
2005	Everlasting Regret	No	Yes	—N/a		
2005	House of Fury	No	Yes	—N/a	Producer and presenter only	
2006	Rob-B-Hood	Yes	Yes	Fong Ka Ho / Thongs		
2007	Rush Hour 3	Yes	No	Chief Inspector Lee		
2007	Air Diary	No	Yes	—N/a		
2007	Kung Fu Zeng	Yes	No	Zeng (voice)		
2008	The Forbidden Kingdom	Yes	No	Lu Yan / Old Hop		
2008	Kung Fu Panda	Yes	No	Master Monkey (voice)		
2008	Run Papa Run	No	Yes	—N/a		
2008	Wushu	No	Yes	—N/a		
2009	Shinjuku Incident	Yes	No	Steelhead		
2009	Looking for Jackie	Yes	No	Himself		
2009	The Founding of a Republic	Yes	No	Reporter	Cameo	
2010	The Spy Next Door	Yes	No	Bob Ho		
2010	Little Big Soldier	Yes	Yes	Little Soldier		
2010	The Karate Kid	Yes	No	Mr. Han		
2010	The Legend of Silk Boy	Yes	No	Xu Rongcun (voice)		
2011	Shaolin	Yes	No	Wu Dao		
2011	Kung Fu Panda 2	Yes	No	Monkey (voice)		
2011	1911	Yes	No	Huang Xing	Also director	
2011	Legendary Amazons	No	Yes	—N/a		
2012	CZ12	Yes	Yes	Asian Hawk	Also director	
2013	Personal Tailor	Yes	No	—N/a	Cameo	
2013	Police Story 2013	Yes	Executive	Detective Zhong Wen		
2014	As the Light Goes Out	Yes	No	—N/a	Cameo	
2015	Dragon Blade	Yes	Yes	Huo An		
2015	Who Am I 2015	No	Yes	—N/a		
2015	Monkey King: Hero Is Back	Yes	No	Monkey King (voice)		
2016	Kung Fu Panda 3	Yes	No	Monkey (voice)		
2016	Skiptrace	Yes	Yes	Bennie Chan		
2016	Railroad Tigers	Yes	Executive	Ma Yuan		
2017	Kung Fu Yoga	Yes	Executive	Jack		
2017	The Nut Job 2: Nutty by Nature	Yes	No	Mr. Feng (voice)		
2017	The Lego Ninjago Movie	Yes	No	Mr. Liu / Master Wu (voice)		
2017	The Foreigner	Yes	Yes	Quan Ngoc Minh		
2017	Bleeding Steel	Yes	Yes	Lin Dong		
2017	Namiya	Yes	No	Namiya	Cameo	
2018	Golden Job	No	Executive	—N/a		
2019	The Knight of Shadows: Between Yin and Yang	Yes	No	Pu Songling		
2019	Viy 2: Journey to China	Yes	No	Master		
2019	The Climbers	Yes	No	Yang Guang	Cameo	
2020	Vanguard	Yes	No	Tang Huating		
2021	Wish Dragon	Yes	Yes	Long (voice)	Mandarin dub	
2021	All U Need Is Love	Yes	No	Supervisor	Cameo	
2021	Good Night Beijing	Yes	No	Chen Shu	Cameo	
2023	Ride On	Yes	No	Lao Luo		
2023	Hidden Strike	Yes	No	Dragon Luo Feng		
2023	Teenage Mutant Ninja Turtles: Mutant Mayhem	Yes	No	Splinter (voice)		
2024	The Diary	No	Yes	—N/a	Director, producer and writer only	
2024	Home Operation	No	No	—N/a	Presenter only	
2024	A Legend	Yes	No	Professor Chen & Zhao Zhan		
2024	Panda Plan	Yes	No	Jackie		
2025	Karate Kid: Legends	Yes	No	Mr. Han		
2025	The Shadow's Edge	Yes	No	Wong Tak-chong		
2026	Unexpected Family	Yes	No	Ren Jiqing		
2026	Panda Plan: The Magical Tribe	Yes	No	Jackie		
TBA	Rush Hour 4	Yes	No	Chief Inspector Lee		
TBA	Armour of God IV: Ultimatum	Yes	No	Jackie a.k.a. "Asian Hawk"		

=== Short film ===
Year	Title	Credited as		Role	Notes
Year	Title	Actor	Producer	Role	Notes
1993	Kin chan no Cinema Jack	Yes	No	—N/a	Anthology film
2010	Kung Fu Panda Holiday	Yes	No	Master Monkey (voice)	
2013	The Unbelievable	Yes	No	Mr. Z	
2016	The Master: A Lego Ninjago Short	Yes	No	Master Wu (voice)	
2017	Zane's Stand Up Promo	Yes	No	Master Wu (voice)	

== As director ==
Year	Title	Director	Writer	Producer	Notes
1979	The Fearless Hyena	Yes	Yes	No	
1980	The Young Master	Yes	Yes	No	
1982	Dragon Lord	Yes	Yes	No	
1983	Project A	Yes	Yes	No	
1985	Police Story	Yes	Yes	No	
1986	Armour of God	Yes	Yes	No	Co-director
1987	Project A Part II	Yes	Yes	No	
1988	Police Story 2	Yes	Yes	No	
1989	Miracles	Yes	Yes	No	
1991	Armour of God II: Operation Condor	Yes	Yes	No	
1998	Who Am I?	Yes	Yes	No	Co-director
2011	1911	Yes	No	No	Co-director
2012	CZ12	Yes	Yes	Yes	

== Documentaries ==
Year	English title	Original title	Notes	Refs.
1989	Son of The Incredibly Strange Film Show		Episode 1; 22 September 1989	
1990	The Best of the Martial Arts Films	金裝武術電影大全		
1996	Biography: Jackie Chan: From Stuntman to Superstar	传记：成龙：从特技人到超级巨星	8 October 1996	
1998	Jackie Chan: My Story	成龍的傳奇		
1999	Jackie Chan: My Stunts			
2002	The Art of Action: Martial Arts in Motion Picture	功夫片歲月		
2003	Cinema Hong Kong: Kung Fu	電影香江：功夫世家		
2003	Traces of a Dragon: Jackie Chan & His Lost Family			
2005	Come Home Gary Glitter		TV documentary, cameo	
2006	The Heavenly Kings		Feature film, mockumentary	
2008	A Touch of Beijing	北京之触	Documentary about Beijing's hosting of the 2008 Summer Olympics.	
2008	Mega Cities: Hong Kong	大城市：香港	20 June 2008	
2018	The Game Changers		Executive Producer	
2018	Jackie Chan's Green Heroes	成龙环保英雄	18 April 2018	
2019	Xing Guang		26 September 2019	

== Television ==
=== Scripted series ===
Year	Title	Role	Notes	Refs.
1996	Martin	Himself	Scrooge, Season 5 Ep. 10	
2000–2005	Jackie Chan Adventures	Himself (live-action segments)	Also executive producer	
2009–2010	Jackie Chan's Fantasia	Himself	Also executive producer	
2017	All New Jackie Chan Adventures	Himself	Also executive producer	

=== Reality shows ===
Year	Title	Notes	Refs.
2008	The Disciple	Aka 龍的傳人 (Disciple of the Dragon)	
2013	Running Man	Episode 135; special guest (with Choi Siwon), Red Team receives a golden boot, which is given to Jackie Chan.	
2013	Happy Camp	21 December 2013; guest (with Jing Tian, Ding Sheng, Lin Shen, Li Tai)	
2014	Happy Together	Guest (with Choi Siwon, Jessica and Narsha)	
