= Dragon Lord =

1982 Hong Kong film by Jackie Chan

- Original Hong Kong poster
- Directed by: Jackie Chan
- Written by: Jackie Chan; Edward Tang; Barry Wong
- Produced by: Raymond Chow; Leonard Ho
- Starring: Jackie Chan; Mars; Hwang In-shik; Tien Feng
- Cinematography: Chan Chung-yuen; Chen Chin-kui
- Edited by: Peter Cheung
- Music by: Frankie Chan
- Distributed by: Golden Harvest
- Release date: 21 January 1982
- Running time: 102 minutes (Hong Kong version)
- Country: Hong Kong
- Language: Cantonese
- Box office: US$8.9 million (est.)

Dragon Lord (also known as Dragon Strike, simplified Chinese: 龙少爷; traditional Chinese: 龍少爺) is a 1982 Hong Kong martial arts comedy film starring and directed by Jackie Chan, who also wrote the screenplay with Edward Tang and Barry Wong. It was originally supposed to be a sequel to The Young Master and even had the name Young Master in Love until it was changed to Dragon Lord. Chan used the project to experiment with various elaborate stunt action sequences in a period setting, serving as a transition between Chan's earlier kung fu comedy period films (such as Drunken Master and The Young Master) and his later stunt-oriented modern action films (such as Project A and Police Story).

== Plot ==
Dragon (Jackie Chan), the son of a Chinese aristocrat, is always getting in trouble, and likes to skip his lessons. Dragon tries to send a love note to the girl he likes via a kite, but the kite gets away. Dragon tries to get the kite and letter back which have landed on the roof of the headquarters of a gang of thieves who are planning to steal artifacts from the town's temple. Dragon interferes with the gang's plans and is forced to fight off the gang.

== Cast ==
- Jackie Chan – Dragon Ho / Lung
- Mars – Cowboy Chin
- Hwang In-shik – The Big Boss
- Tien Feng – Dragon's Father
- Paul Chang – Chin's Father
- Wai-Man Chan – Tiger (as Hui-Min Chen)
- Fung Hak-on – The Killer King (as Ke-An Fung)
- Cheng Kang-yeh – Ah Dee
- Fung Feng – The Referee
- Kang Ho – The Reteree
- Kam-kwong Ho – The Commentator
- Pak-kwong Ho – Spectator
- Yeong-mun Kwon – The Hatchetman (as Kuen Wing-Man)
- Lei Suet – Alice (as Sidney Yim)
- Corey Yuen – Lu Chen gang member
- Mang Hoi – Lu Chen gang member
- Chiu Chung-san - Lu Chen gang member
- Yuan-li Wu – The Matchmaker (as Yuen-Yee Ny)
- Yan Tsan Tang – Smuggler
- Po Tai – Ah Dum Pao (as Tai Do)
- Clement Yip – Thug
- Benny Lai – Braves' team player
- Johnny Cheung – Smuggler

== Production ==
Dragon Lord went over budget and took twice as long to shoot as was originally planned due to Chan's many retakes of shots to get them exactly as he wanted them. One scene in the film is reputed to have taken 2900 takes to complete, although sources disagree on whether the scene in question is the opening scene involving a human pyramid or a sequence depicting a Jianzi game.

The opening bun festival scene was originally intended to end the film but was moved as Chan wanted a spectacular opening to the film. The final fight scene, which takes place in a barn, also featured elaborate stunts, including one where Chan does a back flip off a loft and falls to the lower ground.

According to his book I Am Jackie Chan: My Life in Action, Chan injured his chin during a stunt, making it difficult to say his lines and direct.

This is the first Jackie Chan film that includes outtakes (bloopers). Jackie Chan says that he was inspired to do this by the use of bloopers at the end of The Cannonball Run, a film in which Jackie Chan also starred. His subsequent films all include outtakes.

== Release and box office ==
In its original Hong Kong theatrical run, Dragon Lord grossed HK$17,936,344 (US$2,954,917). The film did not make as much as it was expected to in Hong Kong, but was a big hit in Japan. It was 1982's ninth-highest-grossing foreign film in Japan, where it grossed ¥1.09 billion (US$4.38 million).

In Taiwan, it became the 14th-highest-grossing film of 1982, selling 92,957 tickets and earning NT$5,990,232 (US$152,551). In South Korea, it was the highest-grossing film of 1982, with 298,122 ticket sales in the capital Seoul City, equivalent to an estimated ₩894,366,000 (US$1,223,350). In Spain (where it released in 1984), the film sold 188,958 tickets, equivalent to an estimated €245,645 (US$193,814). Combined, the film grossed an estimated total box office gross of approximately US$8,904,632 (equivalent to $30,000,000 in 2025) in Asia and Europe.

Hong Kong Legends released the DVD on 25 August 2003 in the United Kingdom. Dimension Films released the film on DVD in the U.S. on 11 May 2004.

== Reception ==
Joey O'Bryan of The Austin Chronicle rated it 2.5/5 stars and wrote that the film, while not one of Chan's best, is an early attempt to take the genre into a new direction and set the stage for many of Chan's better, more-realized films. O'Bryan highlighted the film's climactic fight as a "worth the price of admission all by itself". TV Guide rated it 3/5 stars and wrote, "Aside from the meandering, stop-and-go screenplay, there's much to admire about the film." John Sinnott of DVD Talk rated it 3.5/5 stars called it a "fun movie" that moves away from conventional martial arts films.

=== Awards and nominations ===
- 1983 Hong Kong Film Awards:
  - Nomination: Best Action Choreography (Jackie Chan, Fung Hak-on, Corey Yuen Kwai)

== See also ==
- Jackie Chan filmography
- List of Hong Kong films
- List of martial arts films
