= Game of Death =

Incomplete Hong Kong film by Bruce Lee

The Game of Death
- Traditional Chinese: 死 亡 的 遊 戲
- Simplified Chinese: 死亡的遊戏
Transcriptions
Standard Mandarin
- Hanyu Pinyin: Sǐwáng De Yóuxì
Yue: Cantonese
- Jyutping: Sei^{2} Mong^{4} Dik^{1} Jau^{4} Hei^{3}
- Directed by: Bruce Lee
- Written by: Bruce Lee
- Produced by: Raymond Chow; Bruce Lee
- Starring: Bruce Lee; James Tien; Chieh Yuan; Dan Inosanto; Ji Han-jae; Kareem Abdul-Jabbar; Hwang In-shik
- Cinematography: Tadashi Nishimoto
- Edited by: Peter Cheung
- Music by: Joseph Koo; Peter Thomas
- Production companies: Concord Production Inc. Golden Harvest
- Distributed by: Golden Harvest (trailer); Media Asia Group; Fortune Star Media; Arrow Films
- Release dates: 22 October 2000 (incomplete DVD release); 17 July 2023 (incomplete Arrow Video release)
- Running time: 40 minutes (incomplete)
- Country: Hong Kong
- Languages: Cantonese; English
- Budget: $850,000

The Game of Death (Note: The Game of Death, with a definite article, was the English title on the script.The version of the film released in 1978 is known as simply Game of Death.) is an incomplete Hong Kong martial arts film directed by, written by, and starring Bruce Lee. Produced by Concord Production and expected to be released in 1973, over 120 minutes of footage was shot between September and October 1972, mostly from the climax of the film.

During filming, Lee received an offer to star in Enter the Dragon, the first kung fu film to be produced by a Hollywood studio (Warner Bros.) and with a budget unprecedented for the genre ($850,000). Lee died of cerebral edema before the film's release. At the time of his death, he had made plans to resume the filming of The Game of Death. After Lee's death, Enter the Dragon director Robert Clouse was enlisted to finish the film using two body doubles; it was released in 1978 as Game of Death, five years after Lee's death, by Golden Harvest. Surviving footage was also included as part of the documentary Bruce Lee: A Warrior's Journey.

The story of Lee's original 1972 film involves Lee's character who, in order to save his siblings, is forced into joining a group of martial artists who have been hired to retrieve a stolen Chinese national treasure from the top floor of a five-story pagoda in South Korea, with each floor guarded by martial artists who must be defeated while ascending the tower.

The 1978 film's plot was altered to a revenge story, where the mafia attempts to kill Lee's character, who fakes his death and seeks vengeance against those who tried to kill him. The final part of the film uses some of Lee's original film footage, but with the pagoda setting changed to a restaurant building, where he fights martial artists hired by the mafia in an attempt to rescue his fiancée Ann Morris (played by Colleen Camp). This revised version received a mixed critical reception but was commercially successful, grossing an estimated US$50,000,000 (equivalent to $250,000,000 in 2025) worldwide.

It was an influential film that had a significant cultural impact. The original version's concept of ascending a tower while defeating enemies on each level was highly influential, inspiring numerous action films and video games. The film is also known for Lee's iconic yellow-and-black jumpsuit as well as his fight scene with NBA player and student Kareem Abdul-Jabbar, both of which have been referenced in numerous media.

== Original film ==
=== Plot ===
The original plot involves Lee playing the role of Hai Tien (海天), a retired champion martial artist who is confronted by Korean underworld gangs. They tell him the story of a pagoda where guns are prohibited. The pagoda is under heavy guard by highly skilled martial artists; they are protecting a stolen Chinese national treasure (which is not identified at all in any surviving material) held on its top level.

The gang boss wants Hai to be a part of a group of martial artists he assembled, to help retrieve said item by fighting the guardians. This is the boss's second team he's sending; the first team he sent was nearly wiped out. They force the reluctant Hai to participate by abducting his two younger siblings. Along with four other martial artists (two played by James Tien and Chieh Yuan), Hai battles his way up a five-level pagoda. The team encounters a different, and stronger, challenge on each floor.

As originally scripted by Lee, Hai and company enter the temple grounds, where at the pagoda's base, they fight 10 Karate black belts. Inside the pagoda, Hai's team encounters a different opponent on each floor, each one more formidable than the last. The other fighters assisting Hai are handily defeated by the pagoda guardians, as they're not as skilled as Hai; the guardian in turn must be defeated by Hai.

During the pagoda raid, Hai's group was to face the floor guardians: Outside the pagoda, Hai's group was to face The Ten Black-Belt Karate Fighters, led by Bolo Yeung (sensei), while on the ground floor, they were to face The Twenty Kung Fu Fighters. Among the approximately 30 fighters were Lam Ching-ying, Yuen Wah, Unicorn Chan, Bee Chan, and Wu Ngan.

- Hwang In-shik as Expert Kicker – 1st Floor Guardian, (only Ground Floor footage)
- Taky Kimura as an expert in Praying Mantis Kung Fu and Wing Chun – 2nd Floor Guardian (was never filmed either)
- Dan Inosanto as Eskrima Filipina – 3rd Floor Guardian
- Ji Han-jae as Korean Hapkido Master – 4th Floor Guardian
- Kareem Abdul-Jabbar as Mantis (螳) – 5th Floor Guardian

Hai would defeat all 25 formidable masters after his fellow raiders were taken down by each master of the floor. The last raider to be defeated is James Tien's character. He's beaten by the final guardian (Kareem Abdul-Jabbar), a giant fighter who fights with a free and fluid fighting style similar to Hai's Jeet Kune Do. Because of the guardian's great size and strength, in addition to his potent martial artistry, he can only be defeated when Hai recognizes and exploits his greatest weakness: an unusually high sensitivity to light.

Immediately after defeating the giant guardian, Hai turns around and descends the staircase heading out of the pagoda. Despite all the talk of something awaiting up top of the (now unguarded) flight of stairs, there is no mention of anyone going up to retrieve it. No surviving material explains how this affects Hai or his captive siblings. An additional character would be played by George Lazenby, being a spiritual guru involved in some sort of war who would help Hai at the end.

=== Production ===
Although the pagoda was supposed to have five floors, complete scenes were only shot for three of the floors: the "Temple of the Tiger", where Lee faced Inosanto; the "Temple of the Dragon", where he fought Ji Han-jae; and the final floor, known as the "Temple of the Unknown", where he fought Abdul-Jabbar. Hapkido master Hwang In-shik was slated to play the guardian of the first floor, a master of a kick-oriented style, while Bruce's long-time student and good friend Taky Kimura was asked to play the guardian of the second floor, a stylist of praying mantis kung fu.

The goal of the film's plot was to showcase Lee's beliefs regarding the principles of martial arts. As each martial artist is defeated (including Lee's allies), the flaws in their fighting style are revealed. Some, like Dan Inosanto's character, rely too much on fixed patterns of offensive and defensive techniques, while others lack economy of motion. Lee defeats his opponents by having a fighting style that involves fluid movement, unpredictability, and an eclectic blend of techniques. His dialogue often includes comments on their weaknesses.

=== Bruce Lee: A Warrior's Journey ===
Several years later, Bruce Lee historian John Little released Bruce Lee: A Warrior's Journey, a documentary revealing the original footage and storyline of The Game of Death. The documentary also includes a fairly in-depth biography of Lee and leads into the filming of The Game of Death. Originally meant to be a documentary in its own right, it can now be found on the second disc of the 2004 Special Edition DVD release of Enter the Dragon, along with the documentary Bruce Lee: The Curse of the Dragon.

=== Bruce Lee in G.O.D: Shibōteki Yūgi ===
In 2000, the Japanese film Bruce Lee in G.O.D 死亡的遊戯 was released on DVD. This film shows Lee's original vision of the film through the existing footage that was shot for the film before he died, interviews, and historical re-enactments of what went on behind the scenes. A "special edition" DVD was released in 2003.

=== Cast ===
Filmed cast

- Bruce Lee as Hai Tien, also called "the Yellow-Faced Tiger"
- James Tien as Tien Da, the Second Fighter
- Chieh Yuan as Chieh, the Third Fighter (doubled by Hwang In-shik)
- Kareem Abdul-Jabbar as Mantis, the 5th Floor Guardian
- Ji Han-jae as Hapkido Master, the 4th Floor Guardian
- Dan Inosanto as Eskrima Fighter, the 3rd Floor Guardian
- Hwang In-shik as 1st Floor Guardian (only Ground Floor footage)
- Lee Kwan as Mr. Kuan, the Locksmith (voice is heard at film's end)

Unfilmed cast

- Taky Kimura as 2nd Floor Guardian
- Robert Wall as Mr. Wall, the American Fighter and Hai Tien's ally
- George Lazenby as Hai Tien's master
- Nora Miao as Hai Tien's sister
- Uncast Child Actor as Hai Tien's brother
- Carter Wong as Mr. Wong
- Shih Kien as Crime Lord
- Tony Liu as Huang
- Wan Kam-leung as Lee Guo-hao, the Fifth Fighter
- Betty Ting Pei as Hai Tien's wife
- Bolo Yeung as Black Belt Karate Leader – Ground Floor
- Lam Ching-ying, Yuen Wah, Unicorn Chan, Bee Chan, Wu Ngan, and 14 others as Black Belt Karate Fighters – Ground Floor
- Han Ying-chieh, Yuen Biao, Alan Chui Chung-San, and Corey Yuen as Thugs
- Jackie Chan as Fan who asks for Hai Tien's autograph

Intended cast

- Wong Shun-leung was originally approached to play the role of the Wing Chun-oriented 2nd Floor Guardian, but he declined, and was replaced by Taky Kimura.
- Robert Baker, student of Lee's, was considered for the role eventually given to Robert Wall.
- Sammo Hung had been cast as the Third Fighter, but by the time Lee was ready to film with him, Hung had moved on to another project; Chieh Yuan took the part in his stead.

== Game of Death (1978 film) ==
Game of Death
- Game of Death film poster

Chinese name
- Traditional Chinese: 死亡遊戲
- Simplified Chinese: 死亡游戏
Transcriptions
Standard Mandarin
- Hanyu Pinyin: Sǐwáng Yóuxì
- IPA: [sɹ̩̀wǎŋ jǒʊɕî]
Yue: Cantonese
- Jyutping: Sei5 Mong4 Jau4 Hei3
- IPA: Cantonese pronunciation: [se̬imɔ̏ːŋ jɐ̏uhēi]
- Directed by: Robert Clouse; G.O.D. footage: Bruce Lee
- Written by: Robert Clouse; Raymond Chow; Bruce Lee (Note: Credited on Hong Kong version only.)
- Produced by: Raymond Chow
- Starring: Bruce Lee; Gig Young; Dean Jagger; Colleen Camp; Kim Tai-jong; Yuen Biao; Robert Wall; Hugh O'Brian; Dan Inosanto; Kareem Abdul-Jabbar; Mel Novak; Sammo Hung; Ji Han-jae; Casanova Wong
- Cinematography: Tadashi Nishimoto; Godfrey A. Godar
- Edited by: Alan Pattillo
- Music by: John Barry; Joseph Koo
- Production company: Golden Harvest
- Distributed by: Golden Harvest (International); Columbia Pictures (US theatrical); EMI Films (United Kingdom theatrical); 20th Century Fox (NA home video and Kosovo); Fortune Star Media Ltd. (current)
- Release dates: 23 March 1978 (HK); 22 July 1978 (UK); 9 June 1979 (USA)
- Running time: 103 minutes (Int'l cut); 94 minutes (HK cut); 125 minutes (HK premiere); 100 minutes (US cut)
- Country: Hong Kong
- Languages: Cantonese; English
- Box office: US$50 million (est.)

Game of Death is a 1978 Hong Kong martial arts film co-written (under the pseudonym Jan Spears alongside Raymond Chow) and directed by Robert Clouse, with action choreography by Sammo Hung. The film stars Bruce Lee, with Kim Tai-jong and Yuen Biao as his stunt doubles, along with Gig Young (in his final film appearance), Dean Jagger, Colleen Camp, Robert Wall, Hugh O'Brian, Dan Inosanto, Kareem Abdul-Jabbar, Mel Novak, Sammo Hung, Ji Han-jae and Casanova Wong.

=== Plot ===
The 1978 version uses portions of the original footage married to an entirely new plot involving a new character, Billy Lo (盧比利), struggling against a racketeering "syndicate" after gaining international success as a martial arts movie star. When Billy refuses to be intimidated by syndicate henchman Steiner and his gangs of thugs, syndicate owner Dr. Land orders his assassination to serve as an example to others.

Disguised as a stuntman, Land's assassin, Stick, sneaks onto the set of Billy's new film, and shoots Billy during filming. A fragment of the bullet passes through Billy's face, leaving him alive but in need of plastic surgery which alters his facial features. Billy takes the opportunity to fake his death and disguise himself, exacting revenge against those who wronged him one at a time. When the syndicate threatens and kidnaps his fiancée, Ann Morris, Billy is forced to come out of hiding to save her.

In the revised but chopped footage, Bruce Lee's fight scenes inside the pagoda are assumed to take place in the upper floors of the Red Pepper restaurant:

- Dan Inosanto as Pasqual – Lower Floor Guardian
- Ji Han-jae as Restaurant Fighter – Middle Floor Guardian
- Kareem Abdul-Jabbar as Hakim – Quarter Floor Guardian
- Hugh O'Brian as Steiner – Top Floor Guardian

Dr. Land and his thugs have laid an ambush, but in the end, Billy survives the ambush, rescues Ann, and destroys each of the main mobsters one-by-one.

=== Cast ===
- Bruce Lee as Billy Lo (archive footage from incomplete first version)
  - Kim Tai-jong, Albert Sham, and Chen Yao-po as Billy Lo (doubling for Bruce Lee)
  - Yuen Biao as Billy Lo (doubling for Bruce Lee in acrobatics) (Note: Yuen Biao also played a biker in a black jumpsuit in the film.)
  - Chris Kent as the English voice of Billy Lo (dubbing for Bruce Lee)
    - Bruce Lee's actual battle cries are used in the Cantonese, Mandarin and Japanese versions instead of Chris Kent's battle cry voice.
- Gig Young as Jim Marshall
- Dean Jagger as Dr. Land
- Colleen Camp as Ann Morris
- Hugh O'Brian as Steiner
- Robert Wall as Carl Miller
- Dan Inosanto as Pasqual
- Ji Han-jae as the Restaurant Fighter
- Kareem Abdul-Jabbar as Hakim
- Mel Novak as Stick
- Sammo Hung as Lo Chen
- James Tien as Charlie Wang (US version) / Fong Chun (HK version)
- Roy Chiao as Henry Lo (US version only)
- Casanova Wong as Lau Yea-chun (HK version only)
- Chuck Norris as Fighter in Film (archive footage from The Way of the Dragon)
- Austin Wai, Lai Kim-hung, Tai San as Lo Chen's Cornerman
- Tony Leung as David
- Peter Chan Lung as Land's Spy
- Fung Hak-On as Land's thug in yellow tracksuit (US version only)
- Lam Ching-ying, Chung Fat, Mars, Chin Yuet-sang, Chik Ngai-hung, Lam Hak-ming, and Law Keung as Land's thugs
- Lau Kar-wing

=== Production ===
The revised version of the film uses only 12 minutes and 41 seconds of the footage from the original The Game of Death, and for the vast majority of the film, the role of Billy Lo was shared by Korean taekwondo master Kim Tai-jong and Hong Kong martial arts actor Yuen Biao, and was voiced by Chris Kent. The plot of the film allowed Kim and Yuen to spend much of the film in disguises, usually involving false beards and large, dark sunglasses that obscured the fact that they bore little resemblance to Lee. Many scenes, including fight scenes, also included brief close-up bits of stock footage of the real Bruce Lee from his pre-Enter the Dragon films, often only lasting a second or two. These clips are easily recognisable due to the difference in film quality between the old and new footage. At one point in the movie, real footage of Lee's corpse in his open-topped casket is used to show the character Billy Lo faking his death. There is even a scene taking place in Billy's dressing room where a cut-out of Lee's face was taped to a mirror, covering the body double's own face.

=== Soundtrack ===
The American score was composed by John Barry. The vocal theme song "Will This Be The Song I'll Be Singing Tomorrow?" was sung by Colleen Camp.

==== Theme song ====
"Game of Death" (死亡遊戲)
- Lyrics: James Wong
- Composition and Arrangement: Joseph Koo
- Performance: Roman Tam

=== Release ===
Game of Death was released in Hong Kong on 23 March 1978. In the United States, the film was released by Columbia Pictures on 9 June 1979. The film was released in the Philippines by Asia Films on 15 December 1988.

==== Box office ====
The film was successful at the box office in Hong Kong (23 March 1978 release), grossing HK$3,436,169. Within three weeks of its release (by 13 April 1978), the film grossed nearly US$8 million in the Far East. In Japan (14 April 1978 release), it became the eighth highest-grossing film of 1978 with distributor rental earnings of ¥1.45 billion, equivalent to estimated box office gross receipts of approximately ¥3.52 billion (US$16.7 million). In South Korea (May 1978 release), it sold 281,591 tickets in the capital city of Seoul, equivalent to an estimated gross revenue of approximately ₩337,909,200 (US$698,160).

In the United States (1979 release), the film earned millions of United States dollars in its first few weeks, and went on to earn about US$5 million in theatrical rentals, equivalent to estimated box office gross receipts of approximately US$13 million. In France, it was the 14th highest-grossing film of 1978 with 2,256,892 ticket sales, equivalent to an estimated gross revenue of approximately €6,093,608 (US$8,264,929). In Germany, the film sold 750,513 tickets (575,000 tickets in 1978 and 175,513 tickets in 1981), equivalent to an estimated gross revenue of approximately €1,876,283 (US$2,544,854). In Spain, the film sold 1,112,793 tickets, equivalent to an estimated gross revenue of approximately €1,446,631 (US$1,962,106).

Combined, the film grossed a total estimated worldwide box office revenue of approximately US$50,320,736 (equivalent to $250,000,000 in 2025)

==== Critical reception ====
This version of the film received a mixed critical reception, holding a 38% Rotten Tomatoes score from 13 reviews. Criticism of the revised version included the inclusion of scenes that could be considered in bad taste, such as the incorporation of footage of Lee's actual funeral. Another scene, often pointed out by critics of the film, involved a shot of Kim looking at himself in the mirror, with an obvious cardboard cut-out of Lee's face pasted onto the mirror's surface.

Upon its North American release, Cecilia Blanchfield in The Calgary Herald rated it three stars, praising the climactic fight scenes as "Bruce Lee at his best" while criticizing the "abysmal" writing and "clumsily executed" production up until then, calling the film a "poor tribute to a remarkably talented man."

Bey Logan points out a few logic issues with the 1978 film. In order for the henchmen to remain low key, they should be wearing more casual clothes instead of the multicolored tracksuits seen at various parts of the film. But as a rationale, this explains why Lee wears the yellow tracksuit. Also, during the fight between Lee and Kareem Abdul-Jabbar, the scene near the vase in Logan's opinion appears to look choppy, along with the short fight with Hugh O'Brian. In the first half of the English version, during the fight sequences, Lee is seen to be beaten down instead of making short work of the henchmen.

Game of Death could be considered more accessible to Western audiences than Lee's previous films. Compared to other Bruce Lee films like The Big Boss, Fist of Fury, and The Way of the Dragon, Game of Death has more Western characters and the story structure is more straightforward and less culturally specific to Asia.

== Game of Death Redux (2019) ==
On 19 July 2019, timed with the 46th death anniversary of Bruce Lee, producer Alan Canvan premiered a newly edited version of Lee's Game of Death at the Asian American/Asian Research Institute in New York City, with biographer Matthew Polly joining Canvan in discussing the film and answering audience questions. The Redux edit only uses footage shot during the original production, while combining the score composed by John Barry for the 1978 version. It also restores dialogues that were missing in the 1978 version of Game of Death.

The film was released as a special feature (standard definition) in The Criterion Collection's Blu-ray box set of Bruce Lee films on 14 July 2020.

== The Final Game of Death (2023) ==
On 17 July 2023, Arrow Films released a 4K UHD/Blu-ray box set covering Bruce Lee's films at Golden Harvest. Included in the set is a 223-minute documentary on the production of Game of Death. The documentary includes all two hours of footage shot for the project by Lee before his death, restored from an interpositive. The documentary also includes an assembly of the footage, alongside a newly filmed introduction to cover the plot elements that were never shot.

== Legacy ==
=== Other Game of Death films ===
After Bruce Lee 's death, several other films were made based on The Game of Death (original film), after the first appearance, in 1973, of the trailer in the documentary Bruce Lee, the Man and the Legend, several studios exploited the situation by making their own versions of Game of Death based on what they had learned of the story from production stills and magazine articles. Some of these films pre-dated Robert Clouse's official Game of Death (1978 film).

- The Game of Death (1974, starring Ramon Zamora)
- Goodbye Bruce Lee: His Last Game of Death (1975, starring Bruce Li)
- Enter the Game of Death (1978, starring Bruce Le)
- The True Game of Death (1979, Lung Tien-hsiang)
- Game of Death II (Tower of Death) (1981, starring Kim Tai-chung)

Clouse's film had a sequel in 1981, Game of Death II, a kung fu action mystery film directed by Ng See-yuen which used cut footage from Lee's Enter the Dragon to have him make an appearance in the beginning of the film, only to be killed off midway, allowing his on-screen brother to take on the role of protagonist. Aside from the international English dub giving the "Bruce Lee" character the name Billy Lo, this movie appears to have no connection with Clouse's film.

Wong Jing's film City Hunter has a similar premise for a scene. Jackie Chan as Ryu Saeba takes on two tall black men, and the film uses clips of Lee's fight scene against Kareem Abdul-Jabbar to get the better of the two.

=== Influence ===
The original film's concept of ascending a tower while defeating enemies on each level was highly influential, inspiring numerous action films and video games.

==== Film ====
Italian film scholars Simone Bedetti and Lorenzo De Luca identified Game of Death as an early example of what they call the "arcade movie" genre of action films. These "arcade movies" have three characteristic elements: the achievement of a goal, passing a series of levels, and ascending through a path (whether physical or symbolic). This is presented in Game of Death as Lee going up higher floors while facing increasingly dangerous opponents as he ascends the tower. Later examples of action films which Bedetti and De Luca identify as "arcade movies" include Bruce Lee's own Enter the Dragon, the Bruce Willis movie Die Hard (1988), Steven Spielberg's Indiana Jones and the Last Crusade (1989), Paul W. S. Anderson's Mortal Kombat (1995), and the Jean-Claude Van Damme movie Sudden Death (1995).

The Raid, a 2011 Indonesian film, was influenced by Game of Death. It has a similar plot structure, set in a single main location, a grungy high-rise building, with grunts at the bottom and the big boss at the top. This Game of Death formula was also used in the film Dredd (2012) and appeared in an episode of SpongeBob SquarePants.

Several films pay homage to the fight scene between Bruce Lee and Kareem Abdul-Jabbar. The scene is parodied in two Jackie Chan films, City Hunter (1993) where Chan fights two tall black men, and Rush Hour 3 (2007) which reverses it by having a shorter African-American man Chris Tucker fight a taller Chinese basketballer Sun Mingming. The Keanu Reeves film John Wick: Chapter 3 – Parabellum (2019) pays homage in a scene featuring NBA basketball player Boban Marjanović. The French film La Tour Montparnasse Infernale (2001) parodies the scene when Ramzy Bedia fights with Bô Gaultier de Kermoal, wearing the same costumes as Lee and Abdul-Jabbar.

William Zabka referenced Game of Death during his audition for the role of Johnny Lawrence in The Karate Kid (1984), when the director John Avildsen asked him "how old are you? You're a little bigger than our karate kid." Zabka responded, "Bruce Lee was smaller than Kareem Abdul Jabbar, but he beat him" in reference to Game of Death, to which Avildsen responded "Yeah, that's true." That convinced Avildsen to cast Zabka for the role.

==== Video games ====
The plot structure of Game of Death, where a series of martial arts opponents each have a weakness that must be discovered and exploited, established the "end-of-level boss" structure used by beat 'em up games for decades. This structure first crossed over into video games with the 1984 arcade game Kung-Fu Master, which established the beat 'em up genre. Kung Fu Master was initially released as Spartan X in Japan, as a tie-in for the 1984 Jackie Chan film Wheels on Meals (titled Spartan X in Japan), before an international release as Kung-Fu Master (sans Spartan X license). Its boss battle gameplay also became the basis for fighting games such as Street Fighter (1987). Kung-Fu Master also inspired Super Mario Bros. (1985), the Red Ribbon Army saga (1985–1986) in the manga and anime series Dragon Ball, and the French film Kung Fu Master (1988).

==== Comics ====
The superhero Shang-Chi was created as a result of the kung-fu craze started by Bruce Lee in 1973, with artist Paul Gulacy using Lee as a visual inspiration for Shang-Chi. The "Game of Rings" storyline from the comic series Shang-Chi and the Ten Rings was inspired by Game of Death.

=== Yellow-and-black jumpsuit ===
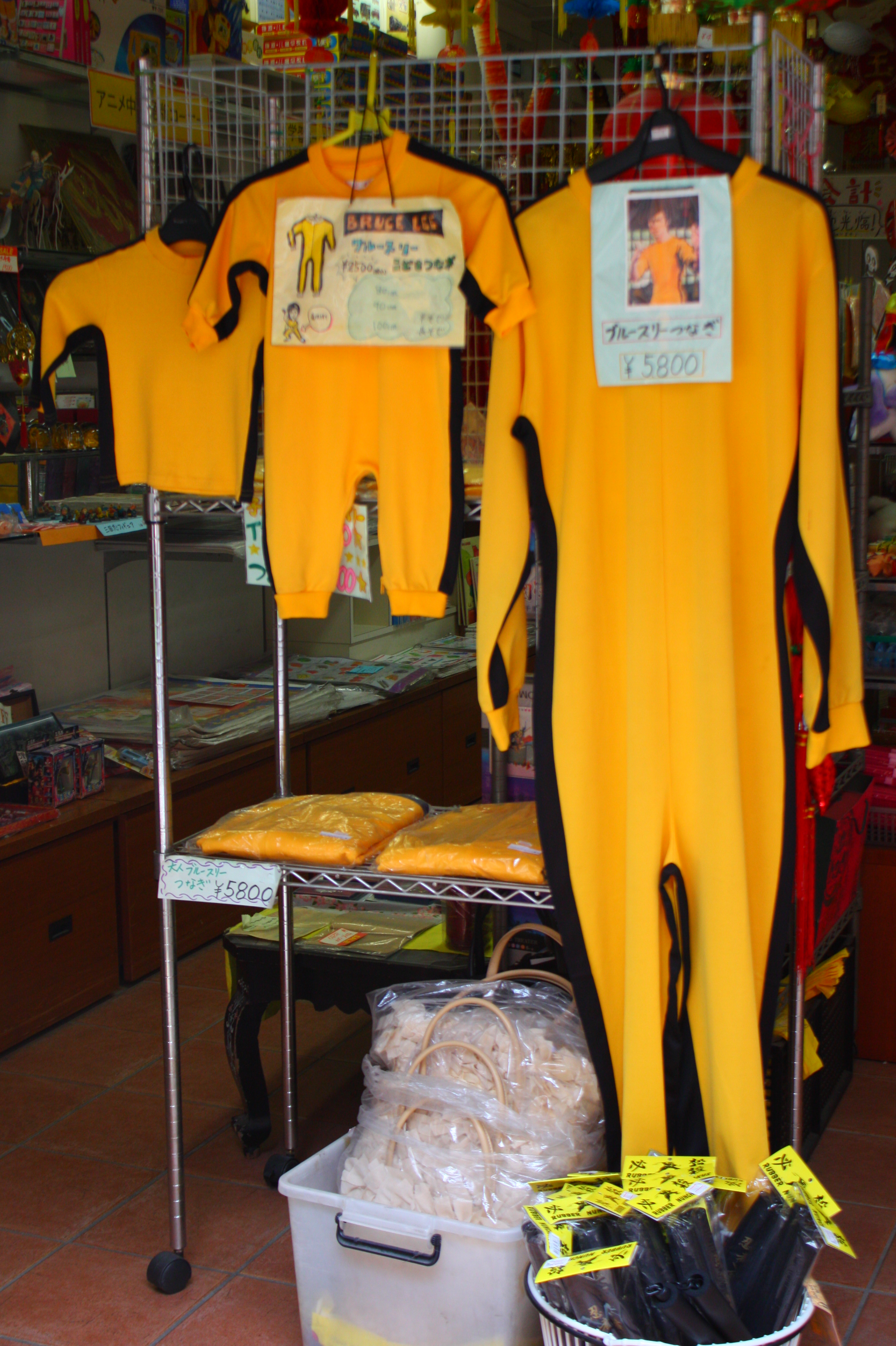
Copies of Lee's famous yellow jumpsuit on sale in Nagasaki

The yellow-and-black jumpsuit which Lee wore in the film has come to be seen as something of a trademark for the actor, and is paid homage to in numerous other media. In the Clouse-directed remake, the filmmakers rationalised its presence by including a scene where Billy Lo disguises himself as one of Dr. Land's motorcycle-riding thugs, who all wear striped jumpsuits.

In the warehouse scene, Billy Lo wears a pair of yellow Adidas, and later, in the Pagoda scene, Bruce Lee wears a pair of Moonstar Jaguar shoes from the ’70s, which are often mistaken for Asics Onitsuka Tiger shoes worn by Uma Thurman in Kill Bill: Volume 1. This is because the real Bruce Lee wore the latter when he was filming the original version, and the double wore the former in the 1978 version to resemble his shoes. The Moonstar Jaguars also closely resemble the Asics Onitsuka Tigers but feature three vertical stripes, like Adidas, crossed by a horizontal stripe similar to Puma models.

In the Lee-directed unfinished version, the jumpsuit should portray personal freedom in the art of combat, without being bounded to a certain fighting style. The cinematic explanation for its presence was the nickname of Hai Tien, Yellow-Faced Tiger, because his fighting outfit and shoes resemble the colours of a Tiger. Over the years, there were many speculations about the colour of the jumpsuit and its meaning. According to Andre Morgan from Golden Harvest, they had a yellow suit with black bars and a black suit with yellow bars. Lee first chose the black suit, but changed it to the yellow because Abdul-Jabbar's footprints were better visible on it.

==== Film ====
- Robert Clouse heavily featured the usage of his own 1978 Bruce Lee film Game of Death (a spin-off of the unfinished 1972 film Game of Death) in a gory theatre scene during the production of the 1982 film Deadly Eyes (which was also produced by Golden Harvest).
- Uma Thurman wears a similar suit in Kill Bill: Volume 1 when she travels to Japan to take on an underworld boss and assassin played by Lucy Liu. In homage to both the film and the remake, Thurman wears a two-piece suit and the Onitsuka Tiger sneakers as part of her motorcycle-riding gear, and keeps the suit on during her battle with Liu and her gang, the Crazy 88.
- In Shaolin Soccer, a similar suit is worn by the goalie "Empty Hand" (Danny Chan Kwok-kwan), who resembles Lee.
- In the Jet Li film High Risk, Jacky Cheung plays an action film star who is losing his fighting ability due to his cowardice and drunkenness. When he regains his courage at the end of the film, he wears a copy of the yellow tracksuit. The role is generally felt to be a parody of Jackie Chan, but the references to Bruce Lee are also obvious.
- The 1985 film The Last Dragon, produced by Motown founder Berry Gordy, centred around a Bruce Lee fan, portrayed by Taimak, in search of reaching martial arts enlightenment who instructed his students wearing the same tracksuit.
- In Revenge of the Nerds, Brian Tochi's character, Toshiro Takashi, wears the yellow jumpsuit while riding a tricycle during the inter-Greek competitions.
- In the live-action City Hunter film (directed by Wong Jing), the scene in which Jackie Chan dispatches his own taller opponents references Lee's fight with Abdul-Jabbar.
- In Police Story 4: First Strike, Jackie Chan wears a similar suit that he gets from a wardrobe of an hotel room, claiming that he is a dry cleaner to the owner, with the same colors and the left and right black line.
- In Finishing the Game, Breeze Loo, played by Roger Fan, wears a yellow and black striped jumpsuit.
- In the 2011 British comedy film On the Ropes, writer and director Mark Noyce added a scene in homage to his idol Bruce Lee which featured Mick Western (played by Ben Shockley) wearing a yellow tracksuit.

==== Music ====
- A short promotional video for the virtual band Gorillaz showed the fictional animated guitarist Noodle taking on a pack of thugs while dressed in the tracksuit and imitating Lee's fighting style. Noodle also wore the suit in the Game of Death short clip from Phase One: Celebrity Take Down.
- The band Sugar Ray, in their video for the single "When It's Over", included a segment in which one of its band members (Rodney Sheppard, Guitarist) fantasizes about having a kung fu battle similar to the fight scene between Lee and Kareem Abdul-Jabbar. The band member wears Lee's tracksuit, his opponent wears a beard, clothes and sunglasses similar to Abdul-Jabbar's, and the video duplicates the scene in which a seated Kareem kicks Lee in the chest, knocking him down and leaving a huge footprint on his chest.
- Avant-garde guitarist Buckethead released a cover of "Game of Death" in 2006. He also wore a yellow tracksuit while playing live and performed with nunchakus on stage.
- American band Far East Movement's song "Satisfaction" featured the yellow jumpsuits in the song's music video; said song was the soundtrack to the 2007 mockumentary Finishing the Game.
- Canadian hard rock duo Indian Handcrafts' song "Bruce Lee" uses the film as lyrical inspiration, while the music video features the two band members performing an over-the-top fight scene, with guitarist Daniel Brandon Allen wearing the signature yellow jumpsuit.
- In the music video for the Iggy Azalea song "Black Widow" (featuring Rita Ora), based on Kill Bill, Azalea wears a white & black tracksuit and Ora wears a black & red tracksuit. Both suits resemble Uma Thurman's version of the tracksuit.
- In the video for Black Label Society's 2009 song "Overlord", frontman Zakk Wylde wears the iconic tracksuit, and the video pays humorous homage to the film.

==== Manga and anime ====
- In the Urusei Yatsura episode "The Mendo Family's Masquerade War", Ataru wears a yellow tracksuit with black stripes while trying to court Mendou's sister, who is sporting nunchakus. Both Ataru's yellow tracksuit and the Mendou sister's nunchakus are a homage to Bruce Lee.
- In the anime/manga Tenjho Tenge, there is a short appearance of a character named "Inosato Dan" who is the leader of the "Jun Fan Gung Fu club" (Jun Fan is Bruce Lee's Chinese name). He resembles Bruce Lee very much, and wears the jumpsuit. However, in the anime the colors of the jumpsuit are switched to a black suit with yellow stripes.
- Duel No. 25 of the Yu-Gi-Oh! manga features some references to Bruce Lee. Yugi's fighting-game character of choice is a Bruce Lee clone called Bruce Ryu. His opponent, the villain of the chapter, wears the yellow jumpsuit and calls his fight with Jonouchi a "Game of Death". The subsequent "Death-T" arc then follows a similar structure to the movie with Yugi fighting his way up to the top stage where he has a one on one bout with Seto Kaiba.
- The second episode of the anime series Cowboy Bebop, "Stray Dog Strut", further pays homage with the episode's main antagonist being named Abdul Hakim (after Kareem Abdul-Jabbar's character) and bearing a strikingly similar appearance.
- The character Mr. Tanaka from Sonic X wears the suit in an episode.
- The character Sasshi from the anime Magical Shopping Arcade Abenobashi also gets a uniform called the Game of Death suit, later imitating Lee in both appearance and mannerisms.
- Another reference is found in Great Teacher Onizuka in which the main character, Onizuka Eikichi, wears the same suits when performing feats of strength like breaking a baseball bat with a kick in front of his class.
- In episode 18 of the anime Gintama, Kagura wears a suit similar to Bruce's suit in this movie.
- The cover for the third volume of the American DVD release of the anime PaniPoni Dash! features the main character Rebecca Miyamoto wearing a track suit similar to Bruce Lee's. The subtitle for the DVD, "Class of Death", also pays homage to Game of Death.
- In episode 20 of Hayate the Combat Butler, Hayate asks Maria if she knows "the art of assassination". She denies it, but Hayate does not believe her and Nagi imagines what Maria would look like wearing a yellow jumpsuit and holding nunchucks.
- In episode 11 of HeartCatch PreCure!, the guest characters for the episode, brothers Masato Sakai and Yoshito Sakai, both wear the yellow tracksuit. Masato Sakai styles himself as a Kung Fu master and his brother is his pupil.
- In episode 23 of Kuromukuro, the character Shenmei Liu wore a yellow tracksuit and does a flying kick similar to Bruce Lee's when her friends were filming a movie.
- In episode 8 of Akiba's Trip: The Animation, the character Arisa Ahokainen wore a yellow tracksuit during her training days with her master.
- In episode 10 of Seton Academy: Join the Pack!, one of the impala species wore a yellow tracksuit.
- In episode 8 of Tonikaku Kawaii, during the sightseeing in Nara, Tsukasa and Nasa were having a conversation that has a reference of Bruce Lee's Game of Death similar to the theatrical poster.
- When cosplaying the character Hong Kong from the anime series Hetalia Axis Powers, fans love to portray him wearing the yellow tracksuit.

==== Cartoons ====
- In "Karate Island", a fourth-season episode of SpongeBob SquarePants (which is itself a take-off of Game of Death), Sandy Cheeks wears a yellow tracksuit similar to Bruce's.
- The character Mandy from The Grim Adventures of Billy & Mandy wore a yellow jumpsuit in the episode "Modern Primitives / Giant Billy and Mandy All-Out Attack". The episode also had parodies of Akira (Mandy drives a bike similar to Kaneda's in the series), the Godzilla franchise (there are several giant monsters that parody monsters from the franchise including the name of the episode) and Kill Bill (a check-off list plus a red-screened close-up mimicking the Bride).
- A game sprite resembling an Asian man can be seen wearing Bruce Lee's yellow suit during the first and third seasons of ReBoot.
- A Gorillabite from the band Gorillaz is titled Game of Death. In the bite, Noodle, the guitarist, dons the yellow tracksuit to take on Russel.
- Episode 100 of the 2003 Teenage Mutant Ninja Turtles cartoon depicts Master Splinter's former owner, Hamato Yoshi, wearing the yellow tracksuit.
- In The Boondocks episode "Let's Nab Oprah", Oprah's bodyguard Bushido Brown is seen as a reference to Jim Kelly's character Williams in Enter the Dragon. Brown also tells the main protagonist Huey Freeman "You come straight out of a comic book", a reference to Enter the Dragon. However, he wears a karate gi version of the yellow and black tracksuit in the episode "Stinkmeaner 3: The Hateocracy".
- In episode 18 of Xiaolin Showdown, the character of Kimiko Tohomiko is seen wearing yellow track pants with a black stripe. The rest of her outfit is yellow with long black gloves.
- In "Tofu-Town Showdown", an episode of the second season of the TV show Chowder, the character Schnitzel wore a yellow tracksuit and a similar Bruce Lee-style haircut; he then turns into a Super Saiyan in a parody of Dragon Ball.
- In the Jackie Chan Adventures episode "The Chosen One", a man is dressed in a yellow jumpsuit and uses nunchucks.

==== Video games ====
- Marshall Law and Forest Law from the Tekken series of fighting games resemble Bruce Lee with their move set, whoops and yells and wear a sleeveless version of the tracksuit.
- In Dead or Alive 4, Jann Lee's third costume is none other than the tracksuit, and his ending movie includes him watching Bruce Lee films to help him practice Jeet Kune Do.
- In the Playmore fighting game Rage of the Dragons, Mr. Jones (who already bears a striking resemblance to Kareem Abdul Jabbar) wears a suit very similar to the famous yellow jump suit.
- The suit is present in the MMORPG Anarchy Online as a piece of equipment for powerful martial artist characters.
- In Castlevania: Dawn of Sorrow, one equippable item is the "kung fu suit", whose icon is a yellow tracksuit with black vertical stripes along the sides.
- Although the suit does not appear in any Street Fighter games, Fei Long wears it in several issues of the UDON Street Fighter comic book and in Masahiko Nakahira's Cammy manga.
- In Grand Theft Auto: Liberty City Stories, the main character can wear an identical outfit called the "Dragon Jumpsuit".
- In Shadow Hearts, Wugui's signature move is called "Game of Death".
- In Shadow Hearts: From the New World, talking cat and drunken master Mao confronts the master of cat martial arts, the tracksuit-clad "Bruce Meow".
- In WWE SmackDown vs. Raw 2008, the tracksuit is available in the "Create a WWE Superstar" mode.
- In Persona 4, the character Chie Satonaka's Persona is dressed in the same yellow jumpsuit, and fights with a combination of spears and Jeet Kun Do.
- In Street Fighter IV, the character Rufus wears a yellow and black tracksuit. The suit matches his personality of having a great love for martial arts movies, leading to his style being adopted from imitating martial arts movies and mail order courses.
- In the online game Dragon Fist 3: Age of the Warrior, one of the characters from martial arts films is Billy Lo (with Lee being animated out) from this film, dressed in the yellow-and-black jumpsuit, fighting with Jeet Kune Do, using a yellow nunchaku (which is not found in the Character Editor) as a weapon, and the one inch punch as a special move.
- In most servers of the Dragonica online game, the gladiator class can summon a Bruce Lee-styled character named Bro Lee who wears the jumpsuit to perform some Kung Fu moves. The players can also buy the suit from the cash shop to equip on their characters.
- The yellow-and-black tracksuit can be bought in Mortal Kombat: Armageddon for use in the Kreate-A-Fighter mode.
- In Rumble Fighter, Billy's jumpsuit is available in yellow, blue and green under the name "Billy Lo". Jeet Kune Do is also available as a fighting style.
- A similar tracksuit can be found and worn in the Capcom game Dead Rising 2.
- In Sleeping Dogs, Wei Shen can wear the "Hai Tien Vintage Jumpsuit".
- In The Last of Us, one of Ellie's unlockable costumes is the yellow jumpsuit that can obtained after beating the game on survivor difficulty.
- In Animal Crossing: New Leaf, there are several pieces of clothing that resemble this iconic outfit. They are referred to as the "Dragon Suit".
- In My Talking Tom, your Tom can unlock the "Jumpsuit Fur" when he reaches level 30.
- In EA Sports UFC and EA Sports UFC 2, the unlockable Bruce Lee character wears yellow-and black-compression shorts modeled after the yellow track suit.
- In Anarchy Reigns, Bayonetta (from the titular franchise) appears as a downloadable character and features a yellow-and-black costume resembling the tracksuit. Bayonetta's later appearances in Super Smash Bros. for Nintendo 3DS and Wii U and Super Smash Bros. Ultimate also features a similar yellow-and-black costume.

==== TV ====
- In Taskmaster's seventh series, Phil Wang wore a costume inspired by the yellow and black jumpsuit from Game of Death. However, this jumpsuit was very revealing of his genitals, leading to jokes at his expense throughout the series from the rest of the cast.

==== Comics ====
- Shang-Chi wore two different suits that were inspired by the yellow and black jumpsuit. The first one, which had a one time appearance in Secret Avengers #18 (2011), was a black tracksuit with red bars. Shang-Chi's second suit, that he wore starting with Avengers vol. 5 #1 (2012), was a modernized version of Lee's tracksuit that was a red jumpsuit with a black pattern on the sides and chest.
- In Iron Fist: The Living Weapon #8 (2014), Iron Fist gained an updated suit that was modeled off Lee's yellow and black tracksuit. The new suit was a black (green in some artwork) tracksuit with yellow bars and included a yellow collar and Iron Fist's signature dragon insignia on the chest.

== Home media ==
As one of Bruce Lee's perennially popular handful of films to receive wide exposure to Western audiences, Game of Death has seen many reissues in every home video format. It is particularly widespread on DVD and Blu-ray and was released on the latter in a new 4K restoration in 2016, scanned from the original negative.

== See also ==
- Finishing the Game
- Bruce Lee filmography
- Sammo Hung filmography
- Yuen Biao filmography
- The Story
