= Hwang In-shik =

South Korean martial artist and actor (b. 1940)

- Born: 13 September 1940 (age 85); Sunchon, Heianhoku Province, Chōsen (now North Pyongan Province, North Korea)
- Style: Hapkido
- Teachers: Choi Yong-sool; Ji Han-jae

Korean name
- Hangul: 황인식
- Hanja: 黃仁植
- RR: Hwang Insik
- MR: Hwang Insik

Hwang In-shik (Korean: 황인식; born September 13, 1940) is a South Korean martial artist and actor. A 10th degree black belt and grandmaster in hapkido, he is known to film audiences for his roles in various Hong Kong martial arts films, including Bruce Lee's Way of the Dragon, Jackie Chan's The Young Master and Angela Mao's Hapkido.

== Early years ==
Born in Sunch'ŏn, north of Pyongyang in present-day North Korea, Hwang In-shik and his family moved to Seoul while he was a young child and it was there that he was introduced to the martial arts, first to Tang Soo Do and then to hapkido at age 13.

Hwang calls Choi Yong-sool, the founder of the art, his teacher. Hwang earned his black belt at age 16 and was sent shortly thereafter to the Korea Hapkido Association headed by Ji Han-jae. During a crucial time in the style's development, many of the prime movers in hapkido today, including Han Bong-soo, Kim Chong-sung and Myung Kwang-sik, were his seniors there. Hwang was especially known at this time for his superlative kicking ability.

He was eventually promoted to 7th-dan black belt in 1976 by the Korea Hapkido Association (대한민국 합기도협회) and was appointed chief instructor of the association's headquarters. He soon became known as an influential and well known teacher of the art.

== Hong Kong cinema ==
Hong Kong filmmaker Huang Feng brought Sammo Hung, Jackie Chan, Tang Wei-cheng, Hu Yin-yin, Angela Mao, Chang Yi and Chin Hsiang-lin to Seoul for a location shoot in 1972. Huang was also looking for impressive new techniques to infuse into the Hong Kong action sequences, and so had his stars train at the Korea Hapkido Association for about four months under Hwang and association chief Ji Han-jae.

Many of the impressive kicking techniques seen in Hong Kong cinema today are a result of the cross-cultural influence of this time. Hung had a particular affinity for the training, and some of his signature techniques such as the jumping double front kick come directly from the hapkido syllabus.

Impressed by the hapkido practitioners, Huang invited both Hwang and Ji to Hong Kong to develop a film idea inspired by the director's experiences in Korea. Made in 1972, the movie was titled Hapkido and is known abroad under the English title Lady Kung-fu. It starred Angela Mao, Sammo Hung and Carter Wong (Huang Chia-da).

In the film, Ji and Hwang basically play themselves, a hapkido master and his top student who teach the style to a group Chinese students. Subsequent films such as Fist of Unicorn (1973) also featured both Hwang and Ji playing different roles.

Hwang went on to star in other films, the first stage of his career ending after the death of Bruce Lee, whom Hwang had been in talks with on a part in Game of Death the week Lee died. Hwang also appeared briefly in Lee's Way of the Dragon in 1972 as a Japanese karateka. After returning to Korea, Hwang over the next few years starred in a series of Korean martial arts movies including A Wandering Hero, Black Leopard and Black Spider. Hwang then immigrated to Canada and opened up a dojang in the city of Toronto, retiring from cinema.

Later, Jackie Chan, a stuntman from Hwang's early films, rose to prominence in Hong Kong cinema and coaxed Hwang out of retirement to film The Young Master (1980), featuring in its original form a 15-minute fight scene between Chan and Hwang, and Dragon Lord (1982), in which Hwang plays a villain opposing Chan.

Hwang's work in Hong Kong cinema ultimately helped promote hapkido in both China and South Korea.

== Life in Canada ==
In 1976, Hwang immigrated to Canada and started a family. He opened a studio in one location and then moved shortly thereafter to the Greek area of Toronto known as the Danforth, where he continues to teach and train on a daily basis.

== Filmography ==
=== Films ===
- The Way of the Dragon, (1972)
  - As Japanese karateka
- The Game of Death, (1972)
  - As 1st Floor Guardian (only Ground Floor footage)
- When Taekwondo Strikes, 1973
- The Young Master (1980)
  - As Master Kam
- Dragon Lord, (1982)
  - As Big Boss

=== TV series ===
- 2nd Republic (TV series) (1989–1990) - Kim Dae-jung

== See also ==
- Han Bong-soo
- Choi Yong-sool
- Ji Han-jae
- Cinema of Hong Kong
