= Armour of God II: Operation Condor =

1991 Hong Kong film by Jackie Chan

- Hong Kong film poster
- Traditional Chinese: 飛鷹計劃
- Simplified Chinese: 飞鹰计划
- Hanyu Pinyin: Fēi yīng jǐ huá
- Jyutping: Fei1 jing1 gai3 waak6
- Directed by: Jackie Chan
- Written by: Jackie Chan; Edward Tang
- Produced by: Raymond Chow; Leonard Ho
- Starring: Jackie Chan; Carol Cheng; Eva Cobo de Garcia; Shôko Ikeda (池田昌子)
- Cinematography: Arthur Wong
- Edited by: Peter Cheung
- Music by: Chris Babida; Stephen Endelman (United States)
- Distributed by: Golden Harvest; Media Asia (Hong Kong); Toho (Japan); Dimension Films (United States)
- Release dates: 7 February 1991 (Hong Kong); 9 March 1991 (Japan); 23 August 1991 (Australia); 18 July 1997 (United States); 20 March 1998 (United Kingdom)
- Running time: 107 minutes 91 minutes (United States)
- Country: Hong Kong
- Languages: Cantonese; English
- Budget: US$15 million
- Box office: US$24.1 million

Armour of God II: Operation Condor (Chinese: 飛鷹計劃; also known as Operation Condor in the United States and as Superfly in the Philippines) is a 1991 Hong Kong action-adventure film written and directed by Jackie Chan, who also starred in the film. It is the sequel to 1986's Armour of God.

Compared to its predecessor, this film is more akin to the Indiana Jones film series in that it features Chan's character Jackie / Condor ("Asian Hawk" in the U.S. release) battling against a former Nazi to retrieve gold from an abandoned German base deep in the Sahara Desert.

Armour of God II: Operation Condor is followed by the 2012 film CZ12.

== Plot ==
Hong Kong treasure hunter Jackie aka Asian Hawk, is summoned by Duke Scapio. At Duke's mansion in Madrid, Spain, Jackie is told of a story of German commander Hans von Ketterling and his regiment burying 240 tons of gold at a secret base in Africa's Sahara Desert before the end of World War II. The 18 soldiers involved in the operation disappeared under mysterious circumstances. By request from the United Nations, Scapio gives Jackie an unofficial mission to locate the base and recover the gold. Aside from acquiring the key to the base, he is partnered with Ada, an expert in African geography. Upon discovery of the gold, Jackie is promised one percent of the treasure, or roughly 2.5 tons of gold.

One night, while snooping around the home of one of the base's caretakers, Jackie meets Elsa, a young German woman, after saving her from two Arab men—Amon and Tasza—who also search for the gold. The next day, he goes to a renowned locksmith and learns that the key is intricately designed for use with a special code. After evading an army of black cars chasing him across town, Jackie is asked by Elsa to let her join his expedition, as she is in search of von Ketterling, who was her grandfather. Arriving in the Sahara Desert, the expedition team picks up Momoko, a Japanese woman who is searching for the meaning of death.

Their camp is attacked by black-veiled bandits who kidnap Elsa and Ada. Jackie and Momoko follow the bandits' trail to a slave market, where they save Elsa and Ada from being auctioned off as sex slaves. Meanwhile, the rest of the expedition team is murdered by a group of mercenaries led by a man who uses a wheelchair. After another run-in with Amon and Tasza, Jackie's group returns to their camp to discover their comrades slain, but Momoko recognizes a statue in one of Elsa's grandfather's pictures and leads them to an ancient temple. After bidding Momoko farewell, the trio enters the ruins, where they encounter a band of vicious tribesmen. While running for their lives, they fall through a loose floor of sand into a cavern, which is part of the secret Nazi base.

They discover the mummified remains of Elsa's grandfather and look through his log book, revealing that the 18 soldiers under von Ketterling ingested cyanide pills and died inside the base upon completion of their mission. However, the trio only counts 17 bodies, with one soldier missing. The man who uses the wheelchair—arriving with his mercenaries and holding Momoko hostage—reveals himself as Adolf, the 18th soldier who murdered Elsa's grandfather after the latter made him a paraplegic for refusing to ingest the cyanide. A furious chase ensues between Jackie's group and the mercenaries throughout the base, which ends with the protagonists getting captured. Upon arriving at the vault, Jackie uses the key and a secret code from Elsa's grandfather's dog tag and opens it, revealing the elevator leading to the gold.

Upon their discovery of the gold, the mercenaries turn their backs on Adolf with the intent of keeping the treasure to themselves. Adolf in turn locks in all of the mercenaries, except for two who chase Jackie to an underground wind tunnel. While Jackie battles the two mercenaries, Elsa and Ada flip random switches in the control room, activating the tunnel's turbine fan. As the three men hang on for their lives, Elsa and Ada attempt to switch off the fan, but they accidentally trigger the base's self-destruct sequence. Adolf tells the quartet that they can escape by having the turbine blow them through the ventilation duct, but he decides to stay to atone for his sins. The quartet gathers as much gold as they can, but the wind force only sends their bodies upward to the desert surface above before the base completely caves in.

As the quartet walks across the desert, they once again encounter Amon and Tasza. With their common lack of a water supply, they finally overcome their differences and try to find water in the Sahara desert.

== Cast ==
- Jackie Chan as Jackie, a.k.a. "Asian Hawk" / "Asian Condor"
- Carol Cheng as Ada
- Eva Cobo de Garcia as Elsa
- Shôko Ikeda (池田昌子) as Momoko
- Aldo Sambrell as Adolf (as Aldo Brel Sánchez)
- Ken Goodman as Adolph's Guard #1
- Steve Tartalia as Adolph's Guard #2
- Vincent Lyn as Adolph's Guard #3 (as Lyn Percival)
- Bruce Fontaine as Adolph's Guard #4
- Wayne Archer as Adolph's Guard #5 (as Archer Wayne)
- Brandon Charles as Adolph's Guard #6
- Low Houi Kang as Adolph's Guard #7
- Peter Klimenko as Adolph's Guard #8
- Christian Perrochaud as Adolph's Guard #9
- Jonathan Isgar as Tasza
- Daniel Mintz as Amon
- Božidar Smiljanić as Duke Scapio
- Mark King as Duke's Guard #1
- Bryan Baker as Duke's Guard #2
- Charles Yeomans as Man with Stolen Clothes

=== Jackie Chan stunt team ===
- Benny Lai
- Mars

== Production ==
Armour of God II: Operation Condor was filmed primarily in Madrid, Spain, and Morocco. The opening scenes where Asian Hawk went powered paragliding was shot in Tagaytay over Taal Lake, Cavite, Philippines. The scene where he stole the gem from the cave tribe and escaped by zorbing was shot in Mount Macolod in Cuenca, Batangas.

The hotel scene where Dodo Cheng is in bath towel and other gun fight scenes in Morocco was shot in Hong Kong on a hill overlooking Sha Tin. Four tons of sand was imported from the Middle East and the entire hotel set was set up. Bangladeshi and Indian extras were hired to act as Moroccans.

According to his book I Am Jackie Chan: My Life in Action, while filming the underground base chase scene, Chan was supposed to swing to a platform with a long chain, but he lost balance and fell to the ground face-first, dislocating his sternum.

In a 2013 interview with CBC, Chan said he was impressed being recognized even in remote areas in Africa. While shooting the film in Southern Morocco he said: "When I was in...in Morocco, middle of nowhere in the desert, all the children look at me, just, uh, put the drunken master pose. I said, 'Wow...'"

== Release ==
Armour of God II was released in Hong Kong on 7 February 1991. In the Philippines, the film was released as Superfly by First Films on 4 December. Project A would later be misleadingly re-released by First Films as its sequel Superfly 2 on 17 September 1992.

=== Box office ===
Chan said in his biography that the film cost HK$115 million (US$15 million), the most expensive Hong Kong film at the time. In its Hong Kong theatrical release, the film grossed HK$39,048,711. It was Hong Kong's second highest-grossing film of 1991.

It had its North American release in 1997. On 1,523 North American screens on its opening weekend, it grossed US$4,731,751 ($3,088 per screen), on track to a US$10,405,394 final gross. The film grossed US$13,713,829 in territories outside of North America, for a worldwide total of US$24,119,223 (equivalent to US$53,808,838 adjusted for inflation in 2021).

=== Critical reception ===
The film has received mostly positive reviews.

It holds a 80% approval rating on Rotten Tomatoes, based on ten reviews; the film has an average rating of 6.5/10.

=== Awards and nominations ===
- 1992 Hong Kong Film Awards
  - Nomination: Best Action Choreography

== Versions ==
The film was originally released in Hong Kong in 1991 with a Cantonese soundtrack and a running time of approximately 106 minutes. An uncut export version of the film was released in the United Kingdom by Entertainment in Video. The VHS was released in 1993, and the DVD in 2001.

In 1992, Dimension Films acquired the U.S. rights. The company did not release the film theatrically until 1997 under the title Operation Condor; this version has a newly commissioned English dub/score and 15 minutes deleted from the final cut. This version was released on LaserDisc and DVD in 1999.

In 2004, Intercontinental Video Limited released an uncut version in Hong Kong. The DVD is anamorphic and includes the Cantonese-language soundtrack with English subtitles.

In 2020, 88 Films Ltd released the original Hong Kong version and the previously unreleased extended 117 minute version on Blu-ray in the UK.

== See also ==
- Jackie Chan filmography
- List of Hong Kong films
