= City Hunter (1993 film) =

1993 Hong Kong film by Wong Jing

- Theatrical release poster
- Directed by: Wong Jing
- Screenplay by: Wong Jing
- Based on: City Hunter by Tsukasa Hojo
- Produced by: Chua Lam
- Starring: Jackie Chan; Joey Wong; Kumiko Goto; Chingmy Yau; Gary Daniels; Leon Lai
- Cinematography: Lau Moon-tong; Ma Gam-cheung; Gigo Lee
- Edited by: Cheung Ka-fai; Peter Cheung
- Music by: Romeo Diaz; James Wong
- Production company: Golden Harvest
- Distributed by: Fortune Star Media Limited
- Release dates: 31 December 1992 (VHS); 14 January 1993 (Hong Kong)
- Running time: 99 minutes
- Country: Hong Kong
- Language: Cantonese
- Box office: US$14.6 million

City Hunter (Chinese: 城市獵人; Jyutping: sing4 si5 lip6 jan4) is a 1993 Hong Kong action comedy film written and directed by Wong Jing. The film stars Jackie Chan, Joey Wong, Kumiko Goto, Chingmy Yau, Gary Daniels, Leon Lai and Richard Norton. It is based on the 1985–91 manga City Hunter by Tsukasa Hojo.

Chan plays Ryo Saeba, a womanizing private investigator hired to retrieve the wayward daughter of a news magnate. In the process, he and his partner/love interest Kaori (Wong) find themselves on a cruise ship taken over by terrorists.

The film was released theatrically in Hong Kong by Golden Harvest on Chinese New Year 1993.

== Plot ==
Ryo Saeba is a private investigator known as the "City Hunter". His assistant is Kaori Makimura, the younger sister of his late partner Hideyuki, who with his dying words made the womanizing detective swear that he would never seduce her.

Saeba and Makimura are hired to locate Kiyoko Imamura, the runaway daughter of the CEO of a prominent newspaper. They are told she is in Hong Kong, but Kaori leaves in the middle of the search, unhappy with the way Ryo ignores her romantic feelings for him and flirts with other women. Ryo finds Kiyoko at a skateboarding park and a chase ensues, but she evades him, stealing a boarding pass for a luxury cruise liner, the Fuji Maru.

Ryo sneaks on board the Fuji Maru to pursue the spurned Kaori, who has boarded with her lustful cousin Rocky "Bigfoot" Dung, not knowing that Kiyoko is on board as well. Unbeknownst to all of them, the cruise has been targeted by terrorists led by ex-US Special Forces Colonel "Big Mac" MacDonald, who plan to hijack it and hold the wealthy passengers hostage. Undercover police officer Saeko Nogami and her assistant Kasumi Asou are in pursuit.

Staying next door from each other, Kiyoko inadvertently overhears MacDonald's plan. MacDonald discovers her and sends one of his men to kill Kiyoko, who knocks him out and escapes. She then bumps into the ship's first officer, who takes her to the boiler room and reveals himself as one of the terrorists. When he attempts to silence Kiyoko, Ryo, who had been staying there since his encounter with Kaori and her cousin at the swimming pool, saves her. When MacDonald's gang arrive, the officer is killed in the shootout while Ryo and Kiyoko escape into a movie theater and beat two opponents.

At the ship's casino, the sailaway party is interrupted when MacDonald kills the captain and terrorizes the partygoers, including Saeko and her sidekick. After robbing them of their valuables, he entices the rich patrons into a sadistic card game. Some opponents are disposed of until Kao Ta, a card gamer who uses his cards as shurikens, joins in. When MacDonald is distracted by seeing Ryo and Kiyoko nearby, Ta and Saeko put an end to his game.

MacDonald's right-hand man Kim kidnaps Kaori and takes her to his room. When Ryo bursts in, both men fight before MacDonald and his men interrupt, capturing Ryo in the process. Kaori escapes, bumping into Kiyoko, Saeko, Kasumi and Kao. They take down a terrorist trying to seduce Rocky and prepare to save Ryo.

Ryo is stood before a firing squad. Kiyoko, Saeko, and Kasumi interrupt the planned execution, but are forced to separate by MacDonald's gang. Kiyoko subdues one henchman, Saeko saves Ta after he runs out of cards in a fight with the terrorists, and Kasumi off a ledge and is left unconscious. Ryo goes into the gaming parlor with his hands still tied, but is thrown into an arcade game by Kim and suffers an electric shock. This causes him to hallucinate and think Kim is Ken from Street Fighter II. After a failed attempt to defeat him as E. Honda, Ryo defeats him as Chun-Li.

As a Taiwanese counter terrorism unit, the "Thunderbolts Squad", arrives and take his men out, MacDonald blows up bombs he had set up all over the ship and takes Kaori hostage at the casino. When Ryo and Saeko arrive, he injures both women and starts a fight with Ryo. However, MacDonald is thrown into the stage and dies when he accidentally steps on his remote, setting off the bombs behind the TV panels.

Ryo and Kaori find Kiyoko and return to her father. He speaks to Ryo privately, seeing him as a future husband to Kiyoko. Listening to their conversation, Kaori leaves in anger, unaware that Ryo has declined the man's offer. Ryo finds her and tries to apologize with a rose, but then Saeko drives up and flirts with him. He gives her the rose instead and furious, Kaori smashes him with a hammer. Ryo wakes up in his recurring dream, surrounded by women at a swimming pool.

== Cast ==
- Jackie Chan as Ryo Saeba (Chinese: 孟波; pinyin: Mèng Bō)
- Joey Wong as Kaori Makimura (Chinese: 惠香; pinyin: Huì Xiāng; 'Carrie Imamura' in the English-language dub)
  - Leila Tong as Kaori as a child
- Kumiko Goto as Kiyoko Imamura (Chinese: 今村清子; pinyin: Jīncūn Qīngzi, translated in some versions as 'Shizuko Imamura')
- Chingmy Yau as Detective Saeko Nogami (Chinese: 芽子; pinyin: Yá Zi, 'Anna Nogami')
- Leon Lai as Kao Ta, the gambler (Chinese: 高達; pinyin: Gāo Dá)
- Richard Norton as Colonel "Big Mac" MacDonald (Chinese: 麥當奴上校; pinyin: Mài Dāng Nú Shàngxiào)
- Gary Daniels as Kim, MacDonald's main henchman
- Carol Wan as Kasumi Asou, Saeko's partner (Chinese: 麻生霞; pinyin: Máshēng Xiá)
- Pal Sinn as Rocky "Bigfoot" Dung (Chinese: 大脚; pinyin: Dà Jiǎo)
- Ken Lo as Chen Ta-wen
- Eric Kot as DJ Hard
- Jan Lam as DJ Soft
- Kenzo Hagiwara as Koji Imamura
- Vincent Laporte as Vincent
- Mike Abbott as Mike
- Louis Roth as Louis
- Mang Hoi as Dan
- Michael Wong as Hideyuki Makimura (Chinese: 中村; pinyin: Zhōngcūn)

=== Note ===
The original Cantonese-language version of the film uses the Chinese names for the main characters, but these are translated as their original Japanese counterparts in the English subtitles and dubbing.

For example, Ryo Saeba's name (冴羽獠) would properly be transliterated into Chinese as Hùyǔ Liáo (Pinyin Romanization). His Chinese name in this film, Mèng Bō / Man Bo (孟波), when read with Japanese on-yomi (Sino-Japanese readings of Chinese characters), would be rendered Mou Ha.

== Music ==
=== Theme song ===
- Song: City Hunter (城市獵人)
  - Singer: Andy Lau
  - Composer: Andrew Tuason
  - Lyricist: Siu Mei
  - Arranger: Andrew Tuason

== Production ==
The idea of adapting City Hunter into a live-action film came after a poll of Japanese Jackie Chan fans showed their enthusiasm for the actor playing Ryo Saeba.

Filming took place mostly aboard a real cruise ship and on-location in Hong Kong, with the final scene shot on-location in Tokyo, Japan. The massive lounge of the cruise ship was a set constructed at Shaw Brothers Studio.

Jackie Chan suffered multiple injuries during filming, including a broken ankle and a dislocated shoulder. There were time constraints on the preparation of the film to release it on time for its release on the Chinese New Year. Near the end of filming, shots of Chan's final fight scene with Richard Norton, had him doubled by stunt performer Mars to save time on reshoots.

According to Norton and Gary Daniels, Wong Jing did not have a set script, but simply wrote dialogue for the actors to ad-lib on the day of filming. Daniels took time off from shooting the Albert Pyun-directed Knights to film City Hunter.

The name of the Street Fighter character was changed from "E. Honda" to "E. Honde". This was because Chan had a contract with Mitsubishi Motors at the time, and Honda is the name of a rival company.

== Release ==
The film was released in Hong Kong by Golden Harvest on Chinese New Year (January 14) 1993, the same day as another Wong Jing film, Fight Back to School III.

== Reception ==
=== Box office ===
In Hong Kong, the film grossed HK$30,843,062 (US$3,986,952), making it the fourth top-grossing Hong Kong film of 1993. In Japan, the film grossed ¥561 million (US$5.05 million).

In Taiwan, where it released in January 1993, it was the ninth highest-grossing film of the year, with NT$46,360,950 (US$1,824,328). In South Korea, the film sold 808,329 tickets and grossed US$3.72 million. Combined, the film grossed a total of approximately US$14,581,280 in East Asia.

=== Critical response ===
The DVD release received mixed reviews in the early 2000s, with a 50% rating on Rotten Tomatoes. Critics praised the action sequences, but criticised the story and slapstick anime style. IGN concluded that "it fails as an adaptation but succeeds as a fun Jackie Chan flick."

== Home media ==
On 23 April 2001, a DVD was released by Hong Kong Legends in the United Kingdom in Region 2. Two years later, Fortune Star released a 3 disc set on 29 December 2003 with two other martial arts films: Story of Ricky and The Dragon from Russia. In the United States, the first DVD release was a port of the Mega Star Region 0 release repackaged by Tai Seng. Later on, 20th Century Fox Home Entertainment (under licensed from Fortune Star) released a region 1 DVD in 2004 utilizing the remastered Fortune Star transfer. It was released again in 2012 by Shout Factory in a double feature single disc with Battle Creek Brawl on both DVD and Blu-ray.

All currently available versions restore a scene that was removed from both the theatrical release as well as the LaserDisc versions of the film. The scene involves one of Kaori's suitors going on a rant about foreign tourists (to wit, Richard Norton's band of terrorists) and saying that he hopes they die of AIDS in Chinese, only to discover that they understood him very well. The scene was removed because the film's distributors were concerned that foreign audiences might be offended by the homophobic nature of the scene.

== See also ==
- Jackie Chan filmography
- List of Hong Kong films
- City Hunter (2024 film)
