= Fist of Unicorn =

1973 Hong Kong film by Ti Tang

- Directed by: Ti Tang
- Starring: Unicorn Chan; Yasuaki Kurata; Chui Meng; Tina Chin Fei
- Distributed by: Pacific Grove Corporation
- Release date: 1973
- Running time: 90 minutes
- Country: Hong Kong
- Language: Mandarin
- Box office: HK$722,848.9 (Hong Kong); 398,022 tickets (France)

Fist of Unicorn (麒麟掌; also known as The Unicorn Palm or Bruce Lee and I) is a 1973 Hong Kong martial art movie, starring Unicorn Chan. Аction and fight scenes were directed and choreographed by Bruce Lee.

== Plot ==
Once upon a time, the rover whose name is Ah-Lung became friend with the young man called Tiger and Lung was invited by Tiger to join his family. When he arrived to Tiger's family's handyman he enjoyed his new life, however Tiger offended Wong who is short tempered son of a notorious gangster, Lung must protect himself from the gangsters. Later Lung and Tiger forced to join the young women who is pursued by Wong after Wong's gang killed her family at the acrobatic troupe. Ah-Lung shares his martial art knowledge with his new friends he met in order to defeat Wong and his thugs.

== Cast ==
- Unicorn Chan as Ah-Lung
- Mang Hoi as Bald Kid, Tiger
- Meng Chui as Stuttering Wong's dream
- Yasuaki Kurata as Sun
- Gam Dai
- Siu Hung Cham
- Wai-man Chan
- Chun Chao
- Mars as Street Trouper (stuttering boy)
- Alan Chui Chung-San as Street Trouper
- Ji Han Jae as Chi Han Kuang
- Hwang In-Shik as Wong's family thug
- Wei Ping Ao as Japanese
- Tsui Siu-Ming
- Ching Chen
- Hsi Ting Cheng
- Alexander Grand as Rensky
- Te Tung Ouyang
- Cham Siu Hung
- Bruce Lee (Unintended cameo), Bruce Lee only made a brief appearance via behind-the-scenes footage, which shows him rehearsing with the actors and stuntmen.
- Jackie Chan extra (Uncredited)

== Versions ==
On some DVD covers, Bruce Lee is featured, although he does not star in the film.

== See also ==
- Jackie Chan filmography
- List of Hong Kong films
- List of martial arts films
