= Panda Plan: The Magical Tribe =

2026 film by Derek Hui

- Theatrical release poster

Chinese name
- Simplified Chinese: 熊猫计划之部落奇遇
- Directed by: Derek Hui
- Written by: Keyang Pan
- Produced by: Derek Hui; Han Mei; Wei Wang
- Starring: Jackie Chan; Ma Li; Qiao Shan; Yu Yang
- Production companies: Emei Film Group; Maoyan Entertainment; Beijing Unimedia Television Culture; Beijing Enlight Media; Huaxia Film Distribution
- Distributed by: HY Media
- Release date: 17 February 2026
- Running time: 99 minutes
- Country: China
- Language: Mandarin
- Box office: US$37.7 million

Panda Plan: The Magical Tribe (also known as Panda Plan 2: The Magical Tribe) (Chinese: 熊猫计划之部落奇遇记) is a 2026 Chinese action comedy film starring Jackie Chan. The film is a sequel to Panda Plan (2024). It was released in China on February 17, 2026.

== Synopsis ==
International superstar Jackie Chan and a panda named Hu Hu, who has distinctive large dark circles around her eyes, accidentally stumble into a primitive tribe isolated from the outside world. Because Hu Hu's appearance perfectly matches the tribe's ancestral totem, she is revered by the villagers as a heaven-sent sacred creature. However, this also means she must follow a series of strange rules. The tribe entrusts her with great responsibility, firmly believing she can resolve their crisis.

To protect Hu Hu, Jackie must outwit and contend with the tribe's eccentric members, including the chief, who occasionally rides the wind and flies; the warrior Qiang Shan, who shifts between cute and fierce; the prince Tu Lu, who is sometimes possessed by divine power; and the highly skilled Princess Sha Yi. Caught between these different forces, Jackie is drawn into an ancient crisis that will determine the fate of the tribe.

== Cast ==
- Jackie Chan as himself
- Ma Li as the chieftain
- Qiao Shan as Qiang Shan
- Yu Yang as Tu Lu
- Wang Yinglu as Sha Yi
- Zhang Zidong as High Priest
- Wang Chengsi as Ba
- Ke Da as Ben
- Song Muzi as Bo
- Feng Man as Historiographer
- Wang Xing as Wang Xing

== Production ==
Filming began on April 25, 2025, in Lincang and Xishuangbanna, Yunnan, with scenes shot in the ancient village of Wengding, and wrapped up in June.

== Release ==
Panda Plan: The Magical Tribe was originally scheduled to be released on October 1, 2025, but was later postponed. On January 28, 2026, the producers officially announced that it would be released in mainland China on February 17, 2026.

== Reception ==
James Marsh of the South China Morning Post rated the film 3/5 stars and wrote, "The Magical Tribe defies all expectations as a marked improvement on its predecessor in almost every conceivable way". Fred Topel of UPI similarly wrote, "Panda Plan 2 stretches credibility more than the original, but still has fun thinking up absurd scenarios for Chan and a panda".
