= Big and Little Wong Tin Bar =

1962 Hong Kong film by Lung To

- Jackie Chan's and Sammo Hung's first acting roles were in the 1962 martial arts film Big and Little Wong Tin Bar, until 2016 thought to be a lost film (image shows the opening scene)
- Traditional Chinese: 大小黄天霸
- Simplified Chinese: 大小黄天霸
- Jyutping: daai6 siu2 wong4 tin1 baa3
- Directed by: Lung To
- Written by: Lee Yuen-man
- Produced by: Leung King-hin
- Starring: Jackie Chan; Sammo Hung; Li Li-Hua
- Edited by: Fan Ka-ken
- Production companies: Great Win Film Co; Panasia Films
- Distributed by: Gala Distribution; Fortune Star
- Release date: 5 December 1962
- Running time: 106 minutes
- Country: British Hong Kong
- Language: Cantonese

Big and Little Wong Tin Bar (Chinese: 大小黄天霸), also known as Seven Little Valiant Fighters (Chinese: 橫掃江南七霸天) and Two of a Kind, is a 1962 Hong Kong film. It is notable for being Jackie Chan's and Sammo Hung's film debut. Until 2016, the film was considered lost. The only footage that survived before that period were a 9-minute opening clip and a short 5-minute clip of dialogue.

== Plot ==
Old hero Wong Samtai, is hosting a banquet for warriors from the four seas. The invitation is received also by the head of the Black Wind fortress Kam Ching, who wants to marry his daughter Lotus to his son Wong Tinbar. But Tinbar does not want this wedding and sees his future with Cheung Kwailan. The afflicted Ching and his daughter steal the jade seal, which belongs to the King of Magical Power. Tinbar is accused of theft. He fails to find a seal and his father is imprisoned. Cheung Kwailan is trapped in the Black Wind Fortress during an overnight search along with Tinbar, but the sudden appearance of the Seven Little Rookies saves her from captivity. Thanks to this, her searches continue and lead to the Dragon Cave with a poisonous python, where the seal is located. Nevertheless, Tinbar is under arrest by the lord. Kwailan and the Seven Rascals force the culprits to surrender - this is part of the Tinbar rescue mission at the lord's residence to settle this problem once and for all.

== Cast ==
Many actors who were featured in this film do not have the same names as they do today, this was due to them taking their master's name, a Chinese tradition while studying martial arts.

- Yu Kai as Wong Tinbar
- Yuen Lau (a.k.a. Jackie Chan) – Played a singing kid and fights a man.
- Yuen Lung (a.k.a. Sammo Hung) – Played an unknown kid.
- Yuen Wah
- Ho Siu-hung – as Master Wong Sam-tai
- Cheng Bik-ying – as Cheung Kwai-lan
- Yam Yin – as Lotus
- Lau Hark-suen – as Black Wind Fortress Kam Ching

=== Additional cast ===
- Yuen Fu (a.k.a. Lee Kuk-wah)
- Yuen Ting (a.k.a. Ng Ming-choi)
- Yuen Man (a.k.a. Mang Yuen-man)
- Yuen Tai
- Lam Yim
- Mui Yan
- Yam Tai-koon
- Wah Wan-fung

== Chronology of events ==
Until 2009, the film was considered lost. During this time, a copy of the film was found in the Hong Kong Film Archive (HKFA). The film has only been publicly screened twice – on 14 and 22 November 2009 – at the Cinema of the HKFA.

Until the screenings at the Cinema of the HKFA and the upload in 2016, there were 3 known scenes, involving Jackie Chan and child actors. Chan fights someone older and then sings. Some footage of the film is shown in Jackie Chan: My Story.

== Filming Information ==
Big and Little Wong Tin Bar was filmed in Hong Kong in Cantonese using black-and-white 35 mm film with a mono audio track.

== See also ==
- List of Hong Kong films
- Jackie Chan filmography
- List of rediscovered films
