= Chieh Yuan =

Malaysian actor and martial artist

- Born: Chieh Yu Kun; 15 March 1945; Kluang, Johor, Malaysia
- Died: 16 November 1977 (aged 32); Hong Kong
- Years active: 1967–1977

Chinese name
- Traditional Chinese: 解元
- Simplified Chinese: 解元
Transcriptions
Standard Mandarin
- Hanyu Pinyin: Xiè Yuán
- Wade–Giles: Hsieh4 Yuen2
Yue: Cantonese
- Jyutping: Gaai2 Jyun4
Southern Min
- Hokkien POJ: Kái-goân
- Musical career
- Also known as: Gai Yuen

Chieh Yuan (15 March 1945 – 16 November 1977) was an actor and martial artist. He was an actor for Shaw Brothers and in 1972, he was cast in Bruce Lee's The Game of Death. Chieh died in 1977 from cerebral edema, the same cause to Bruce Lee's death, and at age 32, the same age at which Bruce Lee had died.

== See also ==
- Cinema of Hong Kong
- Game of Death
- Shaw Bros.
