= Unicorn Chan =

Hong Kong actor, martial artist and stuntman

- 小麒麟
- Born: 1940; British Hong Kong
- Died: 31 March 1987 (aged 46–47); Kuala Lumpur, Malaysia
- Other names: Little Unicorn; Siu Kei-lun
- Years active: 1946–1987

Chinese name
- Chinese: 小麒麟
- Literal meaning: Little Qilin
Transcriptions
Standard Mandarin
- Hanyu Pinyin: Xiǎo Qílín
Yue: Cantonese
- Jyutping: siu2 kei4 leon4

Chan Ling-chung
- Traditional Chinese: 陳玄宗
- Simplified Chinese: 陈玄宗
Transcriptions
Standard Mandarin
- Hanyu Pinyin: Chén Xuánzōng

Unicorn Chan (1940–1987) was a Hong Kong actor, martial artist, stuntman and one of Bruce Lee's best friends since childhood. He acted in many films during childhood including The Birth of Mankind (1946) in which Bruce Lee starred. Unicorn Chan was however not featured in two Bruce Lee biopics, Dragon: The Bruce Lee Story (1993) and The Legend of Bruce Lee (2008).

== Background ==
After Lee left for the States, Chan acted in Hong Kong films in supporting and minor roles. After Lee returned to Hong Kong, Chan was cast in Fist of Fury (1972) and Way of the Dragon (1972).

Unicorn Chan died in Kuala Lumpur, Malaysia on 31 March 1987 from a car crash.

He was portrayed by Jin Au-Yeung in Bruce Lee, My Brother (2010) which is based on Bruce Lee's early life.

== Filmography ==
=== Films ===
This is a partial list of films.

- 1946 The Birth of Mankind
- 1951 Emei fei xia wu chuang feng huo dao
- 1951 Hua Mu Lan
- 1951 Fu zhi guo – Juvenile
- 1953 Fo qian deng zhao zhuang yuan hong
- 1964 Bai gu li hun zhen xia ji – Cat man
- 1964 North meets South
- 1965 Bao lian deng
- 1965 Hei mei gui – Rascal
- 1965 Yuan yang jian xia
- 1966 Spy with My Face – Gang member.
- 1966 Da zui xia
- 1966 Jin pu sa
- 1966 Jin ding you long
- 1966 Bian cheng san xia
- 1967 Guan shi yin
- 1967 Na ge shao nu bu duo qing
- 1967 Sha shou fen hong zuan
- 1968 Guai xia
- 1968 Wei xian shi qi sui
- 1968 Tie guan yin yong po bao zha dang
- 1968 Xiao mian xia
- 1968 That Fiery Girl
- 1968 Ai ta xiang ta hen ta – Nightclub Teddy boy
- 1968 Qing chun lian ge
- 1968Duan hun gu
- 1968 Yu luo cha
- 1968 Die hai hua
- 1968 Qi cai nan xiong nan di
- 1968 Killer Darts
- 1969 Hao xia zhuan
- 1969 Leng nuan qing chun
- 1969 Two Sisters Who Steal – Toby Ho
- 1969 Shaolin Drunk Fighter
- 1969 Huan le kan sheng man hua tang
- 1969 Si wu shi – Wang Qihu
- 1969 Jian dan
- 1969 Hong deng lu deng – Fighter
- 1969 Tiger's Courage
- 1969 A Big Mess
- 1969 Long men jin jian – Black Demon guard
- 1969 Fei nan fei nu
- 1970 The Eagle's Claw – Yin's fighter
- 1970 Brothers Five – Bandit Elder Wang
- 1970 Shen jian you long
- 1970 Forbidden Killing
- 1970 Dang nu chi nan
- 1970 Zuo ri jin ri ming ri
- 1971 Shi wang zhi wang
- 1971 Xue zhao
- 1971 Lang zi zhi ge
- 1971 Gui tai jian
- 1971 Duel for Gold – Wen's assistant
- 1971 Xue fu men
- 1971 Chao piao yu wo
- 1971 Xiao shi yi lang
- 1971 Ba shi zhan
- 1972 Fist of Fury – Jing Wu student (uncredited)
- 1972 Finger of Doom
- 1972 Love and Blood
- 1972 The Way of the Dragon – Jimmy
- 1972 The Devil's Mirror – Ambush innkeeper
- 1972 Intimate Confessions of a Chinese Courtesan
- 1972 Xue ai
- 1972 Da nei gao shou
- 1972 Qun ying hui
- 1972 The Fugitive
- 1972 Black Tavern – Three-Headed Cobra 2
- 1972 Pi li quan
- 1973 Ambush
- 1973 Fist of Unicorn – Ah-Lung
- 1973 Xue sa hou jie
- 1975 The Blood Hero – Fist of Unicorn
- 1975 Jin mao shi wang
- 1976 Bruce Lee: The Man, The Myth – Himself
- 1977 Deadly Snail vs. Kung Fu Killers
- 1977 Bloody Hero
- 1979 The Fairy, the Ghost and Ah Chung
- 1982 Guang Dong liang zai yu
- 1982 Heng sao yu dan dang
- 1983 Shaolin Drunken Fighter
- 1986 Fury of the Heaven – (final film role)
