= Fearless Hyena Part II =

1983 Hong Kong film by Chan Chuen

- Theatrical poster
- Traditional Chinese: 龍騰虎躍
- Simplified Chinese: 龙腾虎跃
- Hanyu Pinyin: Lóng Téng Hǔ Yuè
- Jyutping: Lung4 Tang4 Fu2 Yeok6
- Directed by: Chan Chuen
- Written by: Lo Wei
- Produced by: Lo Wei; Hsu Li-hwa
- Starring: Jackie Chan; Dean Shek; Yam Sai-koon; Kwan Yung-moon; James Tien; Chan Wai-lau; Austin Wai
- Cinematography: Yau Kei
- Edited by: Vincent Leung
- Distributed by: Lo Wei Motion Pictures
- Release dates: 4 March 1983 (Hong Kong); 19 November 1986 (France)
- Running time: 94 minutes
- Country: Hong Kong
- Language: Cantonese
- Box office: HK$2 million (Hong Kong); 59,789 tickets (France)

Fearless Hyena Part II (Chinese: 龍騰虎躍) (also released in Japan as Jakkī Chen no Seiken: 1983 and in West Germany as Der Superfighter II) is a 1983 Hong Kong comedy-themed martial arts action film directed by Chan Chuen, and starring Jackie Chan. It was the sequel to the first The Fearless Hyena.

== Background ==
When film producer Willie Chan left the Lo Wei Motion Picture Company to join Golden Harvest, he advised Jackie Chan to decide for himself whether or not to stay with Lo Wei. Chan began work on the film, but then broke his contract and joined Golden Harvest. This prompted Lo to blackmail him with triads, and to blame Willie Chan for his star's departure. The dispute was resolved with the help of fellow actor and director Jimmy Wang Yu, allowing Chan to stay with Golden Harvest.

In order to complete the film, Lo hired stunt doubles to take Chan's place in the remainder of the film, and used alternative takes and reused footage from the first film. Chan mentions that the end product of the film was so bad that he even tried to stop it from being released by going to court, but Lo released the film regardless. Was released at the peak of the triads running the Hong Kong movie business.

== Plot ==
The story opens with two members of the brotherhood and their two male children being chased by Heaven, Earth, and miscellaneous bad guys. The two members get away separately with their children. 20 years later, we see Cheng Lung (Jackie Chan) as he hunts frogs and snakes and keeps them in his pants. You learn he was one of the boys. The other is Lung's slacking cousin Tung (Austin Wai) who uses windmill-driven levers to deliver things to and from bedside, even a chamberpot and breakfast.

Two cousins team up to avenge the cold-blooded murder of their respective paternal figures, who were slain by the two aforementioned age-old arch enemies Heaven and Earth in hot pursuit while slaughtering the entire Yin-Yang brotherhood along with them. After the unfortunate and untimely loss of his father, Lung's long-lost uncle resurfaces. The two slacking Kung Fu prodigies then endeavor to fight the "devil" duo to the death.

== Cast ==
- Jackie Chan as Cheng Lung (also archive footage)
  - Li Hsiao Ming as Cheng Lung (doubling for Jackie Chan)
- Austin Wai as Tung
- James Tien as Ching Chun-nam / Old Chan
- Chan Wai-lau as Ching Chun-pei
- Yen Shi Kwan as Heaven Devil (Heaven and Earth Society Leader)
- Kwan Yung-moon as Earth Devil
- Hon Kwok Choi as Ah Choi
- Im Eun Joo as Hsia Ling
- Dean Shek as Shek Earth / Jaws Four

== Box office ==
The film grossed HK$1,983,793 at the Hong Kong box office. In France, the film sold 59,789 tickets in 1986.

== See also ==
- Jackie Chan filmography
- List of Hong Kong films
- List of martial arts films
