= Panda Plan =

2024 film by Luan Zhang

- Theatrical release poster

Chinese name
- Traditional Chinese: 熊猫計劃
- Simplified Chinese: 熊猫计划
- Hanyu Pinyin: Xióngmāo jìhuà
- Directed by: Luan Zhang
- Written by: Wei Xu; Meng Yida; Luan Zhang
- Produced by: Han Mei; Wei Wang
- Starring: Jackie Chan; Xiang Wei; Ce Shi; Yanbo Han
- Cinematography: Daxin Dong
- Edited by: Yiding Ma
- Music by: Yixin Huang
- Production companies: Tianjin Maoyan Weiying Culture Media; Emei Film Group Co., Ltd.
- Distributed by: Tianjin Maoyan Weiying Culture Media
- Release date: 1 October 2024
- Running time: 99 minutes
- Country: China
- Language: Mandarin
- Budget: ¥180 million (US$25 million)
- Box office: US$42.2 million

Panda Plan (Chinese: 熊猫計劃) is a 2024 Chinese action comedy film starring Jackie Chan. It was released in China on October 1, 2024.

== Plot ==
Jackie Chan plays a caricaturized version of himself as an international action film star who gets involved in the rescue operation to save a famous zoo panda named Hu Hu from mercenaries.

Soon after legendary kung fu star Jackie Chan is invited to adopt a beloved zoo panda named Hu Hu, a notorious international crime syndicate sets its sights on the panda bear and offers a massive bounty of 100 million dollars for his capture. Faced with this sudden crisis, Jackie enlists the help of his agent and Hu Hu's fiercely dedicated caretaker, leading the trio on an outrageous and unforgettable adventure as they seek to outsmart and outkick the bad guys at every turn.

== Cast ==
- Jackie Chan as himself
- Wei Xiang as David
- Shi Ce as Su Xiaozhu
- Han Yanbo as Cha Kun
- Dani Ray as Harry
- Andy Friend as Director

== Production ==
The production was officially announced on August 10, 2023, including the participation of actors Jackie Chan and Yanbo Han. Filming was completed in October 2023. Chan lost consciousness while filming one scene in a headlock, which was released as a "behind the scenes" clip.

The official October 1, 2024 release date for China was announced on August 30, 2024. The film had a limited release in 25 North American cities on October 18, 2024.

== Reception ==
The film grossed more than ¥261 million yuan (approximately $36.8 million) in its initial release in China.

James Marsh of the South China Morning Post gave the film 1 out of 5 stars, calling it a "tedious trudge through lazily choreographed fight sequences, sluggish chases, and torridly scripted interactions between Chan’s lethargic protagonist and an interchangeable ensemble of goofball mercenaries." Paul Bramhall of City on Fire was similarly unimpressed: "A charmless affair devoid of any purpose or entertainment value, at one point a bad guy says, “What is Jackie Chan doing here!?”, which is the same question anyone who dares watch it will likely also find themself asking." Nevertheless, taking it for what it is, Mike McGranaghan of The Aisle Seat called it an "infectiously silly" "fast-paced comic adventure" despite "a couple wrong notes."
