= The Fearless Hyena =

1979 Hong Kong film by Jackie Chan

- Theatrical release poster
- 笑拳怪招
- Directed by: Jackie Chan
- Written by: Jackie Chan
- Produced by: Hsu Li-hwa
- Starring: Jackie Chan; James Tien; Dean Shek
- Cinematography: Chen Yung-shu
- Edited by: Liang Yung-tsan
- Music by: Frankie Chan; Chen Hsua-chi
- Production company: Goodyear Movie Company
- Distributed by: Lo Wei Motion Picture Co., Ltd.
- Release date: 17 February 1979 (Hong Kong)
- Running time: 97 minutes
- Country: Hong Kong
- Language: Cantonese
- Box office: US$2.9 million (est.)

The Fearless Hyena (Chinese: 笑拳怪招) is a 1979 Hong Kong martial arts film starring, written and directed by Jackie Chan in his directorial debut at the age of 24. Also released in the United States under the title Revenge of the Dragon, and in Japan under a different title and theme song called Crazy Monkey (Japanese: クレイジー • モンキー).

The film was a box office success, and released in Hong Kong on 17 February 1979, and even spawned a loose sequel titled Fearless Hyena Part II in 1983.

The film initially focuses on a martial arts student who lacks self-control and has a gambling habit. He is soon offered a position as a martial arts teacher in a school with a poor reputation. He unwittingly attracts the attention of a villainous kung fu master.

== Plot ==
Ching Hing-lung (Jackie Chan) is a youngster, living in a remote village with his grandfather, kung fu master Ching Pang-fei (James Tien). Lung does not take his training seriously enough, he gambles, and he gets into fights which lead him to display the skills his grandfather has told him he must keep secret.

Lung briefly finds employment selling coffins, working for an unscrupulous proprietor (Dean Shek), who even stoops to selling second-hand coffins. Lung is fired when he accidentally traps his boss in one of the coffins.

After making his escape, he runs into three thugs he had beaten up earlier, who ask him to teach them kung fu. Lung meets their sifu, Tee Cha (Lee Kwan), the unskilled leader of the Everything Clan. Master Tee offers Lung a lucrative job training his students and fighting against the top fighters from rival schools. This boosts the reputation of the school and of the scheming Master Tee.

However, Lung makes the mistake of naming the school under the Ying Yee clan name. This comes to the attention of evil kung fu master Yam Tin-fa (Yam Sai-kwoon), who finds and kills Lung's grandfather. But, Lung eventually takes revenge for his grandfather's murder after undergoing rigorous training from The Unicorn (Chan Wai-lau).

== Cast ==
- Jackie Chan as Shing Lung (voiced by Tang Wing-hung)
- James Tien as Ching Pang-pei, Lung's grandfather
- Chan Hui-lau as Unicorn
- Yen Shi-kwan as Yen
- Lee Kwan as Tee Cha
- Dean Shek as The Coffin Seller
- Ricky Cheng as "The Willow Sword" Bar Tar (Cameo)
- Kim Young Il as Chin Wa-li (Cameo)
- Cheung Fu Hung as Great Bear
- Ma Chiang as Iron Head
- Wong Yiu as Stony Egg
- Wong Chi-sang as One of Yam's men
- Peng Gang as One of Yam's men

== Fight scenes ==
Fearless Hyena features several unusual slapstick fight scenes, including a chopsticks duel (to which an homage was later paid in the cartoon film Kung Fu Panda), Hing-lung fighting while disguised as a cross-eyed intellectually disabled man, disguised as a woman, and using "Emotional Kung-Fu", a style that involves vividly displaying the emotions of anger, sorrow, joy and happiness to find the opponent's weakness, thus fighting whilst crying or laughing.

== Box office ==
In Hong Kong, the film grossed a total of HK$5,445,535 (US$1,088,526) at the Hong Kong box office.

In South Korea, where it released in 1980, the film sold 436,545 tickets in Seoul City, equivalent to an estimated ₩873,090,000 (US$1,437,345).

In France, it sold 187,706 tickets in 1984, equivalent to an estimated €506,806 (US$399,870).

Combined, the film grossed an estimated US$2,925,741 (equivalent to $13,000,000 in 2025) in Asia and Europe.

== See also ==
- Jackie Chan filmography
- List of martial arts films
- List of films in the public domain in the United States
