= The Big Brawl =

1980 film by Robert Clouse

- Theatrical release poster

Chinese name
- Traditional Chinese: 殺手壕
- Simplified Chinese: 杀手壕
Transcriptions
Standard Mandarin
- Hanyu Pinyin: shāshǒu háo
Yue: Cantonese
- Jyutping: saat^{3} sau^{2} hou^{4}
- Directed by: Robert Clouse
- Written by: Robert Clouse
- Produced by: Raymond Chow; Fred Weintraub
- Starring: Jackie Chan; Kristine DeBell; Mako; Ron Max; David Sheiner; Rosalind Chao; Lenny Montana; Peter Marc; José Ferrer
- Cinematography: Robert C. Jessup
- Edited by: George Grenville; Peter Cheung
- Music by: Lalo Schifrin
- Distributed by: Golden Harvest (H.K.); Warner Bros. (U.S.)
- Release dates: 10 September 1980 (U.S.); 16 October 1980 (H.K.)
- Running time: 95 minutes
- Countries: Hong Kong; United States
- Language: English
- Budget: $6 million
- Box office: US$21.5 million (est.)

The Big Brawl (Chinese: 殺手壕; lit. 'Killer's Trench', also released as Battle Creek Brawl) is a 1980 martial arts action comedy film which marked Jackie Chan's first attempt to break into the American movie Hollywood market. A joint Hong Kong and American co-production, it was directed by American filmmaker Robert Clouse and featured much of the crew from Enter the Dragon (1973), which was also produced by Golden Harvest Studios. The film also co-stars Mako, Kristine DeBell, and José Ferrer.

The film is set primarily in Chicago, Illinois in the 1930s (although it was shot in Texas) and follows Chan's character, a Chinese American martial artist, as he single-handedly takes on the Mafia, leading to a no-holds-barred street fighting tournament that culminates in a battle royale survival brawl.

While a moderate success in North America and Hong Kong, The Big Brawl was a box office disappointment as it performed below expectations in these markets, though it went on to have more success in other Asian and European markets. The film's disappointing performance in North America, however, led to Chan being advised to try supporting roles such as the Japanese racing car driver in The Cannonball Run. Chan later made another attempt to break into the American market with 1985's The Protector, which performed worse than this film. It was not until 1995 with Rumble in the Bronx that a Chan film showcasing his signature humor and stunt-work was a major hit in American theaters.

== Plot ==
In 1930s Chicago, Chinese immigrant Jerry Kwan leads a very easy-going life with his white girlfriend, Nancy, and his family. His father owns a restaurant, and one day, he is threatened by the mob to pay a part of his profits. As the mob exits, Jerry enters the scene and rushes out the door to catch up with them. He answers back by taking them on and eventually catches the eye of the mob for his unique fighting skills, learned from his eccentric chiropractor uncle Herbert. Mobster boss Dominici has been looking for a fighter to defeat his rival Morgan's champion, Billy Kiss - whose trademark "Kiss of Death" finishing move is to kiss his opponents while killing them with a crushing bear hug.

Dominici's gang kidnaps Jerry's brother's fiancée to coerce Jerry into fighting for them in the Battle Creek Brawl, a no-rules, all-in street fighting tournament in Texas. The mob promises to return his brother's fiancée and give him the prize money as long as Jerry wins the tournament. After a failed rescue attempt, Uncle Herbert trains Jerry, concentrating on speed and agility as he must fight much larger and stronger opponents. Jerry, Herbert and Nancy travel to Battle Creek and, after surviving a massive battle royale elimination round and then winning a series of single combats, Jerry ultimately wins the Brawl by defeating Billy Kiss. The mob returns the kidnapped fiancée and all ends happily.

== Cast ==
- Jackie Chan as Jerry Kwan
- José Ferrer as Dominici
- Kristine DeBell as Nancy
- Mako as Herbert Kwan
- Ron Max as Leggetti
- David Sheiner as Morgan
- Rosalind Chao as Mae
- Lenny Montana as John
- Pat E. Johnson as Carl
- Hard Boiled Haggerty as Billy Kiss
- Chao-Li Chi as Mr. Kwan
- Jocelyn Lew as Miss Wong
- Peter Marc as Jug
- Gene LeBell as Stroke
- Larry Drake as Judge

== Production ==
The Big Brawl was the first attempt to market Jackie Chan to a Western film audience. Though Chan was already a major star in East Asian markets, he remained a relative obscurity in North America, outside of the import market. Golden Harvest mogul Raymond Chow hoped to replicate the success of Bruce Lee, to whom Chan was often compared early on, in Enter the Dragon. To that end, he hired much of the same crew as Enter the Dragon, including director Robert Clouse, producer Fred Weintraub, musical composer Lalo Schifrin, and editor Peter Cheung.

In his autobiography I Am Jackie Chan, Chan said that he appeared in the film during a self-imposed exile in America, due to a dispute with director Lo Wei, who was purported to have Triad connections and had threatened him for breaking a contract. The dispute was eventually resolved through the intercession of Triad-linked actor Jimmy Wang Yu, and Chan resumed his Hong Kong career in 1982.

In the hopes of better acclimatizing an American film audience to Chan, Weintraub surrounded him with a wholly-American cast, including established actors like José Ferrer and Mako, Playboy Playmate Kristine DeBell, and The Godfather actor Lenny Montana. This backfired, as Chan's lack of English fluency and American cultural norms meant he struggled to find chemistry with his co-stars. Chan likewise did not have his usual stunt team present, meaning he had less control over the stunts and action scenes that he was accustomed to.

In an interview with Chan on the region 2 DVD, Chan discusses the differences between Chinese and American styles of action. In his early US films, The Big Brawl and The Protector (1985), Chan had to perform the typical American fight sequences involving punches, kicks and doing few takes, all the way to the end of the action scene. It was not until Rumble in the Bronx (1995) that Chan was allowed to use more of his preferred action style in a North American setting, in which he works together with his stunt team and co-stars. It was also then that he was able to do as many takes as he needed in order to capture the sequences adequately.

In I Am Jackie Chan, Chan relates one scene in the production in which Robert Clouse was not interested in Chan's idea, which was to flip out of a car. Clouse wanted Chan to simply walk from the car to his father's restaurant. Chan responded, "No one will pay money to see Jackie Chan walk!", and felt that the lack of freedom to choreograph sequences the way he wanted underlined the reason for the film's failure.

The climactic fight scene was filmed in Floresville, Texas and featured 1,200 extras.

== Reception ==
The Big Brawl opened on August 29, 1980, on 231 screens in the United States and Canada. In its opening weekend, it grossed US$1,108,025 ($4,792 per screen). By October 1980 (upon its release in England), the film had grossed US$9 million in the United States, making it a commercial success there. It sold 3.2 million US tickets and ranked among the year's top 40 highest-grossing films in North America, with its US gross equivalent to US$29 million adjusted for inflation in 2018. However, it was ultimately a disappointment to distributor Warner Bros., who were expecting an Enter the Dragon sized hit.

In Hong Kong, the film grossed HK$5,776,530 (US$1,160,878). That made it the year's second-highest-grossing film at the Hong Kong box office, earning even more than Enter the Dragon, which had grossed HK$3.3 million in Hong Kong. However, the film's performance in Hong Kong was considered a disappointment to Golden Harvest.

The film had more success in other international markets. In Taiwan, it grossed NT$8,546,008 (US$212,587) from 296,931 admissions, becoming the second-highest-grossing film of 1980. In South Korea, it was also the second top-grossing film of 1980 (behind Jackie Chan's The Young Master), with 233,674 admissions in Seoul, equivalent to an estimated ₩467,348,000 (US$769,931). In Japan, it grossed ¥940 million (US$4.3 million).

In France, where the film released as Le Chinois on February 18, 1981, it was the 24th-highest-grossing film of 1981 with 1,510,009 admissions, equivalent to an estimated €4,077,024 (US$4,688,376). In Germany, where it released on March 1, 1981, it was the 43rd-highest-grossing film of 1981 with 174,967 box office admissions, equivalent to an estimated €437,418 (US$479,574). In Spain, the film sold 486,489 tickets, equivalent to an estimated €632,436 (US$880,541).

Combined, the film's total estimated worldwide box office gross was approximately US$21,491,887 (equivalent to $84,000,000 in 2025). In terms of box office admissions, the film sold a combined 5,902,070 tickets in the United States, Taiwan, Seoul, France, Germany, and Spain.

=== Critical reception ===
On Rotten Tomatoes the film has an approval rating of 67% based on reviews from six critics. Variety magazine gave it a generally favorable review at the time, calling it "an amusing chopsocky actioner whose appeal is not limited to the usual audience for this genre."

In retrospective interviews, Chan was critical of the film, considering a stifling and unfulfilling experience.

== See also ==
- Jackie Chan filmography
- List of martial arts films
