= The Young Master =

1980 Hong Kong film by Jackie Chan

- Hong Kong film poster

Chinese name
- Traditional Chinese: 師弟出馬
- Simplified Chinese: 师弟出马
Transcriptions
Standard Mandarin
- Hanyu Pinyin: Shī Dì Chū Mǎ
Yue: Cantonese
- Jyutping: Si1 Dai2 Ceot1 Ma2
- Directed by: Jackie Chan
- Written by: Jackie Chan; Edward Tang; Lau Tin-chi; Tung Lu
- Produced by: Raymond Chow; Leonard Ho
- Starring: Jackie Chan; Yuen Biao; Fung Fung; Shih Kien
- Cinematography: Chen Ching-chu
- Edited by: Peter Cheung
- Music by: Frankie Chan
- Production company: Golden Harvest
- Distributed by: Golden Harvest; Media Asia Group
- Release date: 9 February 1980
- Running time: 106 minutes
- Country: Hong Kong
- Language: Cantonese
- Box office: est. US$6.2 million

The Young Master (Chinese: 師弟出馬; pinyin: Shī Dì Chū Mǎ, literally: "Junior Brother Takes Action") is a 1980 Hong Kong martial arts film starring and directed by Jackie Chan, from a screenplay by Chan, Edward Tang, Lau Tin-chi, and Tung Lu. It co-stars Yuen Biao, Fung Fung and Shih Kien. The film was released theatrically in Hong Kong on 9 February 1980.

Notable for being the first film that Jackie Chan worked on for Golden Harvest, it is his second film as director. The film was produced by Raymond Chow and Leonard Ho.

== Plot ==
The school attended by Junior-rank students Dragon and his brother, Tiger is entered against a rival school in a Lion dance competition. The school needs to win the prize money to remain open but their star performer, Tiger, is seemingly injured when he falls from a ladder, leaving his brother, Dragon, to take his place. During the competition, Dragon realizes that his brother feigned his accident in order to take part in the competition for the rival school.

The rival school wins the competition, but the truth emerges about Tiger's betrayal and he is exiled in disgrace. However, Dragon vows to bring back his errant brother so the pair can make amends to their master. Dragon sets off on his mission, but en route is mistaken for a criminal known as The White Fan by local police chief, Sang Kung along with his son and daughter. Meanwhile, Tiger collaborates with his employers (the rival school) by freeing a dangerous criminal known as Kam. However, Tiger is later framed for a bank robbery. To stop his brother from being arrested, Dragon promises to apprehend the escapee, Kam.

The Young Master ends with a furious, brutal fight between Kam and Dragon, in which Dragon sustains substantial damage. At the beginning of the fight, it appears that Kam has the upper hand as he punishes Dragon with blindingly fast punches and kicks. However, after consuming water from an opium pipe given to him by a whimsical old man, Dragon becomes energized and defeats Kam. The Young Master ends with Dragon returning to his hometown, a hero (albeit one in full body cast from the many injuries he sustained).

== Cast ==
- Jackie Chan as Sheng Lung / Dragon (voiced by Tang Wing-hung)
- Shih Kien as Sang Kung
- Yuen Biao as Sang Kung's son / Fourth Brother
- Wei Pai as Tiger
- Tien Feng as Master Tien
- Hwang In-shik as Master Kam
- Fung Fung as Ah Suk
- Lee Hoi-sang as Kam's Second Bodyguard
- Fung Hak-on as Kam's First Bodyguard
- Lily Li as Sang Kung's Daughter
- Fan Mei-sheng - Sheng as Bull
- Yue Tau-ean as Cross Eye
- Bruce Tang Yim-chan as Ah Chang

== Production ==
Chan nearly suffocated when he injured his throat.

== Music ==
The theme song played over the closing credits, Kung Fu Fighting Man was the first song recorded and performed by Jackie Chan. He has since gone on to release many records, and has performed the theme songs on many of his films.

== Versions ==
There are two main versions of the film; a 106-minute Hong Kong cut, and a 90-minute international cut.

The original version of the film that Chan handed over to Golden Harvest was reportedly three hours in length.

== Box office ==
In Hong Kong, the film grossed HK$11,026,283 (US$206,247), making it the #1 movie in Hong Kong for 1980 and breaking the all-time domestic box office record. In South Korea, it was the highest-grossing film of 1980, with 436,631 box office admissions in Seoul City, equivalent to an estimated ₩873,262,000 (US$1,438,652). In Japan, it was the 21st highest-grossing film of 1981, earning ¥930 million (US$4.22 million). In Spain (where it released in 1982), the film sold 288,196 tickets, equivalent to an estimated €374,655 (US$367,050). Combined, the film grossed an estimated total of approximately US$6,231,949 (equivalent to $24,000,000 in 2025) in Asia and Europe.

== See also ==
- Jackie Chan filmography
- List of Hong Kong films
- List of martial arts films
