= The Close Encounter of the Vampire =

1986 Hong Kong film by Lau Kar-leung

- Film poster
- 殭屍怕怕
- Directed by: Yuen Woo-ping; Tsui Siu-ming (uncredited)
- Screenplay by: Law Kam-fai; Leung Kar-yan; Yuen Cheung-yan; Yuen Yat-chor
- Produced by: Yuen Woo-ping
- Starring: Leung Kar-yan; Yuen Cheung-yan
- Cinematography: Kuo Mu-sheng; Lin Tzu-jung
- Edited by: Chen Po-wen; Chen Bo-yan
- Music by: Tang Siu-lam
- Production company: Fee Tang Production Co.
- Distributed by: Golden Princess Amusement Co., Ltd.
- Release dates: 23 August 1986 (Taiwan); 25 September 1986 (Hong Kong)
- Running time: 90 minutes
- Country: Hong Kong
- Language: Cantonese
- Box office: HK$3,570,701

The Close Encounter of the Vampire (Chinese: 殭屍怕怕; pinyin: Jiang shi pa pa), also known as The Close Encounters of Vampire, Dragon vs. Vampire, or Dragon Against Vampire, is a 1986 Cantonese-language Hong Kong comedy horror film directed by Yuen Woo-ping. It is a jiangshi film based on Chinese folklore.

== Plot ==
The villagers of Wanling, Hunan must perform an exorcism every 50 years to prevent preserved corpses from becoming jiangshi. One year the ritual is botched, causing one adult jiangshi and one child jiangshi to rise from the grave. A traveling Taoist named Ku-Su warns the villagers and even attempts to fight the child jiangshi, but local orphans from Yuen Cheung-Yan's Peking Opera see this and take the child jiangshi into their protection, mistaking Ku-Su for a villain.

== Cast ==
- Cheng Tung-chuen as Vampire's Son
- Hsiao Kao-shan
- Hui Bok-yin as Orphan
- Lee Chok-hon as Orphan
- Leung Kar-yan as Ku-Su
- Lin Kuang-chin as Stage Manager
- Ma Chin-ku as Vampire
- Chang Kwok-leung as Orphan
- Wong Kau-yi as Orphan
- Chris Yen as Big Sister
- Yuen Cheung-yan as Master
- Yuan Shen as Village Head
- Yuen Shun-yi as Taoist Priest
- Yuen Yat-chor

Three of the director's ten siblings, Yuen Shun-yi, Yuen Cheung-yan, and Yuen Yat-chor, appear in the film.

== Production ==
The Yuen Clan is credited as the martial arts director. The Yuen Clan consists of Yuen Woo-ping and five of his ten siblings, namely Yuen Cheung-yan, Yuen Shun-yi, Yuen Yat-chor, Yuen Chun-yeung, and Yuen Lung-chu.

Donnie Yen's younger sister Chris Yen played her debut role in the film, causing her to miss an exam, as reported in The Straits Times on 11 July 1986.

== Release ==
The film was released in Taiwan on 23 August 1986, followed by a theatrical run in Hong Kong from 25 September to 2 October 1986 earning HK$3,570,701.

== Reception ==
Reviewer Simon of the14amazons.com gave the film a rating of 1 out of 5 stars, writing, "There's not much action and what there is is not very good - far below the standard of MR. VAMPIRE, and with none of the ingenuity of Yuen Clan fare such as MIRACLE FIGHTERS and TAOISM DRUNKARD. There's very little to recommend the film at all - the comedy is lazy, typical comedy of errors and slapstick stuff. The action is mediocre, the plot is misconceived."

The review on onderhond.com reads, "Woo-ping Yuen tried to cash on the vampire hype, but his attempt feels flimsy and rushed. Some mediocre martial arts, extremely over-the-top performances and loud comedy make this a forgettable affair. The fast pacing and some random weirdness kept me watching, but this is easily one of Yuen's worst films."

A review by Kenneth Brorson on sogoodreviews.com reads, "Despite setting the majority of the last half hour in daylight and bringing in familiarity when the story dictates the crippled master is training his new disciple, the prior, dark terror ride extends and is pretty jarring via various dream sequences threatening to take out main characters earlier than we expect. Mixing comedy and horror more freely at this point, it isn't intrusive and doesn't betray the continually rising stock built up through the Korean horror exercise starring martial arts genre actors. A successful IFD pickup in quality, possibly not money-wise but that's further testament to how the business process was handled at IFD." In a brief summary review, Kenneth Brorson wrote, "The Yuen clan were more than capable of supernatural and creative shenanigans (The Miracle Fighters, Taoism Drunkard etc) so involving kids and a hopping vampire in a production they have tons of credits on, you would expect something magical at least every now and again. The answer is no as if anything all involved and their efforts come off as fulfilling a reluctant obligation. The humour is tired, there's no action or exciting physicality and if anything it's an embarrassing example of seeing the Yuen clan get together and no one wants to be there."

A review by Thomas Weisser in Asian Trash Cinema 001 (1992) reads, "A routine comedy horror film set in medieval China. Nothing new here."
