= The Buddhist Fist =

1980 Hong Kong film by Yuen Woo-ping

- Film poster
- 佛掌羅漢拳
- Directed by: Yuen Woo-ping; Tsui Siu-ming (Co-Director)
- Screenplay by: Tsui Siu-ming; Wong Jing; Lam Chi-ming
- Produced by: Yuen Woo-ping
- Starring: Tsui Siu-ming; Yuen Shun-yi
- Cinematography: Ma Koon-wah
- Edited by: Law Siu-kwong
- Music by: Frankie Chan
- Production company: Peace Film Production
- Distributed by: Golden Harvest
- Release date: 7 May 1980
- Running time: 90 minutes
- Country: Hong Kong
- Language: Cantonese

The Buddhist Fist (Chinese: 佛掌羅漢拳), also known as Secret of the Buddhist Fist, is a 1980 Hong Kong martial arts comedy film directed by Yuen Woo-ping with Tsui Siu-ming as an uncredited co-director.

== Plot ==
Orphans Si Ming and Ah Hsiang are raised by monks, who train them in the variations of the Buddhist Fist technique. Si Ming becomes a monk, but Ah Hsiang grows up and moves to the city. When he loses his job at a barber shop for fighting with a customer, he and his friend return home to visit his godfather. But when he gets there, he finds that his godfather, a police officer, is missing. While they search for him, various assassins try to murder him, but he always escapes, until he discovers that the culprit is a local tea merchant who has crippled his godfather and trapped him in the basement. Si Ming tries to rescue him, but he dies after he writes a mysterious character in the dirt. As Ah Hsiang attempts to investigate and solve the crime, he discovers a plot to steal a valuable jade Buddha.

== Cast ==
- Tsui Siu-ming as Si Ming
- Yuen Shun-yi as Ah Hsiang
- Chan Siu-pang as The boy's master
- Fan Mei-sheng as Fat Master
- Yuen Siu-tien as Sleeping monk
- Lee Hoi-sang as Mr. Chen
- Chan Lung as Yu
- Ho Pak-kwong as Barber shop owner
- Yuen Jan-Yeung as Undercover Agent
- Yuen Cheung-yan as Leader of thugs / Stutterer with bird cage
- Tong Ching as Cloth seller
- Wu Dai-wai as Sheriff
- Cheung Hei as Ah Hsiang's godfather
- Au Shu-cham as Sheriff's assistant
- Yue Tau Wan as Barber Shop Customer (Cameo)
- Addy Sung as Assassin Disguised as Fortune Teller
- San Kuai as Assassin Disguised as Gimp
- Yuen Yat-chor - as Temple Guard
- Yu Miu-lin
- Che Dei
- Yeung Sai-gwan
- Hoh Tin-shing
- Yuen Chun-yeung

The director's brother Yuen Shun-yi stars as Ah Hsiang. Another brother of the director, Yuen Cheung-yan, appears as the leader of the thugs as well as a stutterer with a bird cage. Two other brothers of the director, Yuen Yat-chor and Yuen Chun-yeung, appear in nameless roles. The director's father Yuen Siu-tien appears as the sleeping monk guarding the temple.

== Production ==
The Yuen Clan is credited as the martial arts director. The Yuen Clan consists of Yuen Woo-ping and five of his ten siblings, namely Yuen Cheung-yan, Yuen Shun-yi, Yuen Yat-chor, Yuen Chun-yeung, and Yuen Lung-chu.

== Release ==
The film was released in Hong Kong on 7 May 1980.

== Reception ==
Reviewer Tony Ryan of fareastfilms.com gave the film a rating of 3 out of 5 stars, writing, "The most consistently good action director in Hong Kong’s history – whatever the genre – has arguably been Yuen Woo-Ping, and this old-school classic is just another typical example of why he is perceived as such. [...] The plot follows a formulaic seek and revenge storyline with a few plot-twists thrown in to keep it relatively fresh. However, what we all want to see from a film like this is intricate kung-fu choreography, and for the most part, it delivers."

Reviewer Andrew Borntreger of badmovies.org gave the film a rating of 3 out of 5, writing, "A number of 'item fu' fight scenes are scattered throughout the movie. For those of you unfamiliar with the term, this is when the combatants are either using an unusual item as a weapon (like a chessboard) or fighting around the item (like a birdcage). When done correctly it almost seems like a dance, the two warriors trading the item as they exchange blows. They pulled it off marvelously here, though the songbird looked a little perplexed and wigged out after his cage was tossed around."

Reviewer Ben Johnson of kungfumovieguide.com gave the film a rating of 4 out of 5 stars, writing, "There is little in the way of surprises in this early Yuen Clan romp, but Woo-ping‘s sensitive side does seep through via the boys’ playful affections and the monk's complex psychology. What sets this aside from many, many others of its kind is the director's gradual progression into a more experimental and inventive style of film making. The fight choreography takes many unexpected turns, transforming ordinary situations (a meal or a game of chess) into magnificently crafted routines, with everyday items transformed into lethal weapons." The review concludes, "His sense of humour would later get much broader and the kung fu more eccentric (Dreadnaught, Drunken Tai Chi), but The Buddhist Fist sees Yuen Woo-ping in a wonderfully reflective mood and his feet still firmly on the ground. The result is a rough diamond."

Reviewer John Kreng of martialartsentertainment.com wrote, "The action here is good, fast, and plentiful. The fights are a classic of the genre during this period and are very well choreographed. If you’ve never seen this film you are in for a nice treat. Even though this is an early Woo-Ping effort, he and his clan show you why they are one of the best fight choreographers in the business. Each fight is different in style, tempo, and mood."

Reviewer Kami of darksidereviews.com gave the film a rating of 6.5 out of 10, writing, "The Buddhist Fist is what we can call a family production: the choreography is provided by the Yuen clan, Yuen Woo-Ping is the co-director and producer, and among the other members of the family, Yuen Cheung Yan, Yuen Yat Chor, Simon Yuen and Yuen Shun-Yi make appearances in turn." The review concludes, "Starting with a simple but solid plot, Wong Jing (yes, yes) and Tsui Siu-Ming added too many useless passages to the screenplay, pretexts for fight scenes in order to fill a significant void. At the same time, with Wong Jing writing, we couldn't be surprised. Even the fights seem botched, later on. From genius choreographers like Yuen Woo-Ping, we were used to more efficiency (Snake In The Eagle's Shadow) and inventiveness (The Miracle Fighters)."

Reviewer Sean Gilman of thechinesecinema.com wrote that "the film is plagued by a half-baked mystery, wildly broad supporting performances, and leads that simply lack the star charisma to carry a plot like this. But the fight scenes are simply amazing. Yuen Woo-ping directs his brother Yuen Shun-yee and Tsui Siu-ming in some of the best hand-to-hand fight scenes in the genre (the finale is as good as it gets). Yuen's father Yuen Siu-tien (the Drunken Master himself) also appears and the stunts and choreography are credited to the whole Yuen family. The screenplay was co-written by Wong Jing, perhaps the nuttiest of lowbrow Hong Kong directors. I'm just going to go ahead and blame him for everything wrong with the movie."
