= Hong Kong Film Award for Best Action Choreography =

Annual Chinese film award

- Awarded for: Achievement in action choreography
- Country: Hong Kong
- Presented by: Hong Kong Film Awards
- First award: 1983

The Hong Kong Film Award for Best Action Choreography is an annual Hong Kong industry award presented to a choreographer or a group of choreographers for the best achievement in action choreography. Since action scenes have an essential role in Hong Kong action cinema, this award is regarded as an important category.

== History ==
The award was established at the 2nd Hong Kong Film Awards (1983) and the first winner in this category was the group of choreographers Sammo Hung, Lam Ching-ying, Yuen Biao & Billy Chan Wui-Ngai for their contribution in staging the action scenes of The Prodigal Son. Jackie Chan has the most wins with 10, of which 7 is credited with the Jackie Chan Stunt Team. Sammo Hung has the most nominations with 24, of which 9 is credited with his stunt team. Note that not every co-choreographer is credited by a film, and even credited co-choreographers can be excluded from a nomination.

== Winners and nominees ==
Year	Nominee	Film	Note
1983 (2nd)	Sammo Hung, Lam Ching-ying, Yuen Biao & Billy Chan Wui-Ngai	The Prodigal Son	
1983 (2nd)	Jackie Chan, Corey Yuen, Fung Hak-On	Dragon Lord	
1983 (2nd)	Corey Yuen, Mang Ho	Ninja in the Dragon's Den	
1983 (2nd)	Lau Kar-leung, King Chue, Siu Hau	Legendary Weapons of China	
1983 (2nd)	Yuen Woo-ping, Brandy Yuen Chun-Yeung, Yuen Shun-yi, Yuen Cheung-Yan, Yuen Yat-Choh, Chiu Chung-Hing	The Miracle Fighters	
1983 (2nd)	Ma Yin-Tat, Poon Ching-Fuk, Wong Seung-Hoi, Yu Hoi	Shaolin Temple	
1984 (3rd)	Yuen Biao, Lam Ching-ying, Billy Chan Wui-Ngai	Winners and Sinners	
1984 (3rd)	Corey Yuen	Zu Warriors from the Magic Mountain	
1984 (3rd)	Brandy Yuen Chun-Yeung, Yuen Shun-yi	The Champions	
1984 (3rd)	Ching Siu-tung	Duel to the Death	
1984 (3rd)	Sammo Hung, Lam Ching-ying, Yuen Biao & Billy Chan Wui-Ngai	The Dead and the Deadly	
1985 (4th)	Jackie Chan Stunt Team	Project A	
1985 (4th)	Sammo Hung Stunt Team	Hocus Pocus	
1985 (4th)	Jackie Chan Stunt Team	Wheels on Meals	
1985 (4th)	Billy Chan Wui-Ngai	Long Arm of the Law	
1985 (4th)	Lau Kar-leung	The Eight Diagram Pole Fighter	
1986 (5th)	Jackie Chan Stunt Team	Police Story	
1986 (5th)	Corey Yuen, Mang Hoi	Yes, Madam	
1986 (5th)	Sammo Hung Stunt Team	Mr. Vampire	
1986 (5th)	Sammo Hung Stunt Team	Heart of Dragon	
1986 (5th)	Yuen Biao, Lam Ching-ying	My Lucky Stars	
1987 (6th)	Ching Siu-tung	Witch from Nepal	
1987 (6th)	Ching Siu-tung	Peking Opera Blues	
1987 (6th)	Corey Yuen, Yuen Biao, Mang Hoi, Tsui Ha	Righting Wrongs	
1987 (6th)	Mang Hoi	Royal Warriors	
1987 (6th)	The Liu Clan	Martial Arts of Shaolin	
1987 (6th)	Sammo Hung Stunt Team	Twinkle, Twinkle Lucky Stars	
1988 (7th)	Jackie Chan Stunt Team	Project A Part II	
1988 (7th)	Jackie Chan Stunt Team, Lau Kar-Wing, Danny Yuen Ching-Yeung	Armour of God	
1988 (7th)	Sammo Hung Stunt Team	Eastern Condors	
1988 (7th)	Tsui Siu-Ming	Hoi Si Jan Lau	
1988 (7th)	Ching Siu-tung	A Better Tomorrow 2	
1988 (7th)	Ching Siu-tung, Alan Chui Chung-San, Philip Kwok, Lau Chi-Ho, Wu Chi-Lung	A Chinese Ghost Story	
1989 (8th)	Jackie Chan Stunt Team	Police Story 2	
1989 (8th)	The Liu Clan	Tiger on Beat	
1989 (8th)	Jackie Chan Stunt Team, Sammo Hung Stunt Team	Dragons Forever	
1990 (9th)	Jackie Chan Stunt Team	Miracles	
1990 (9th)	Sammo Hung Stunt Team, Yuen Wah, Yuen Tak	The Iceman Cometh	
1990 (9th)	Sammo Hung Stunt Team, Yuen Cheung-Yan, Mang Hoi	Pedicab Driver	
1991 (10th)	Ching Siu-tung	The Swordsman	
1991 (10th)	Ching Siu-tung	The Terracotta Warrior	
1991 (10th)	Ching Siu-tung, Lau Chi-Ho, Wu Chi-Lung	A Chinese Ghost Story II	
1991 (10th)	Yuen Tak	The Dragon from Russia	
1992 (11th)	Yuen Cheung-yan, Yuen Shun-yi, Lau Kar-wing	Once Upon a Time in China	
1992 (11th)	Jackie Chan Stunt Team	Armour of God II: Operation Condor	
1992 (11th)	Yuen Tak	Savior of Soul	
1992 (11th)	Lee Moon-Wah	Prison on Fire 2	
1992 (11th)	Ching Siu-tung, Ma Yuk-Sing, Cheung Yiu-Sing	A Chinese Ghost Story III	
1993 (12th)	Yuen Woo-ping	Once Upon a Time in China II	
1993 (12th)	Ching Siu-tung	Royal Tramp 2	
1993 (12th)	Ching Siu-tung, Yuen Tak	New Dragon Gate Inn	
1993 (12th)	Ching Siu-tung, Yuen Tak, Ma Yuk-Sing, Cheung Yiu-Sing	Swordsman II	
1993 (12th)	Stanley Tong, Tang Tak-Wing, Alien Sit Chun-Wai, Chan Man-Ching, Wong Ming-Sing	Police Story 3	
1994 (13th)	Corey Yuen, Yuen Tak	Fong Sai-yuk	
1994 (13th)	Ching Siu-tung	The Heroic Trio	
1994 (13th)	Jackie Chan	Crime Story	
1994 (13th)	Yuen Tak	Once Upon a Time in China III	
1994 (13th)	Yuen Woo-ping, Yuen Cheung-Yan, Yuen Shun-yi, Ku Huen-chiu	Iron Monkey	
1995 (14th)	Lau Kar-leung & Jackie Chan Stunt Team	Drunken Master II	
1995 (14th)	Sammo Hung	Ashes of Time	
1995 (14th)	Yuen Woo-ping	Fist of Legend	
1995 (14th)	Corey Yuen	The New Legend of Shaolin	
1995 (14th)	Corey Yuen, Yuen Tak	The Bodyguard from Beijing	
1996 (15th)	Stanley Tong, Jackie Chan	Rumble in the Bronx	
1996 (15th)	Yuen Biu, Mang Hoi, Stephen Tung	The Blade	
1996 (15th)	Jackie Chan Stunt Team, Sammo Hung Stunt Team	Thunderbolt	
1996 (15th)	Corey Yuen, Yuen Tak	My Father Is a Hero	
1996 (15th)	Bruce Law Lai-Yin	Full Throttle	
1997 (16th)	Stanley Tong	Police Story 4: First Strike	
1997 (16th)	Ching Siu-tung, Ma Yuk-Sing	Dr. Wai in "The Scripture with No Words"	
1997 (16th)	Stephen Tung	Shanghai Grand	
1997 (16th)	Yuen Woo-ping	Black Mask	
1997 (16th)	Ma Yuk-Sing	Big Bullet	
1998 (17th)	Stephen Tung	Downtown Torpedoes	
1998 (17th)	Sammo Hung	Once Upon a Time in China and America	
1998 (17th)	Jackie Chan Stunt Team, Cho Wing	Mr. Nice Guy	
1998 (17th)	Yuen Bun	Island of Greed	
1998 (17th)	Yuen Bun	Lifeline	
1999 (18th)	Jackie Chan	Who Am I?	
1999 (18th)	Dion Lam	The Storm Riders	
1999 (18th)	Bruce Law Lai-Yin	Extreme Crisis	
1999 (18th)	Stephen Tung	Hitman	
1999 (18th)	Stephen Tung	Hot War	
2000 (19th)	Stephen Tung	Purple Storm	
2000 (19th)	Jackie Chan Stunt Team	Gorgeous	
2000 (19th)	Cheng Ka-Sun	The Mission	
2000 (19th)	Dion Lam	A Man Called Hero	
2000 (19th)	Li Chung-Chi	Gen-X Cops	
2001 (20th)	Yuen Woo-ping	Crouching Tiger, Hidden Dragon	
2001 (20th)	Li Chung-Chi	Gen-Y Cops	
2001 (20th)	Alien Sit Chun-Wai	Tokyo Raiders	
2001 (20th)	Stanley Tong, Alien Sit Chun-Wai	China Strike Force	
2001 (20th)	Xiong Xin-Xin	Time and Tide	
2002 (21st)	Stephen Tung, Jackie Chan Stunt Team	The Accidental Spy	
2002 (21st)	Ching Siu-tung	Shaolin Soccer	
2002 (21st)	Ching Siu-tung	My Schoolmate, the Barbarian	
2002 (21st)	Corey Yuen	The Avenging Fist	
2002 (21st)	Yuen Woo-ping, Yuen Bun, Ku Huen-chiu, Yuen Shun-Yi	The Legend of Zu	
2003 (22nd)	Ching Siu-tung	Hero	
2003 (22nd)	Philip Kwok	The Touch	
2003 (22nd)	Dion Lam	Infernal Affairs	
2003 (22nd)	Corey Yuen, Guo Jianyong	So Close	
2003 (22nd)	Stephen Tung	Princess D	
2004 (23rd)	Donnie Yen	The Twins Effect	
2004 (23rd)	Yuen Bun	Running on Karma	
2004 (23rd)	Stephen Tung	Heroic Duo	
2004 (23rd)	Chin Ka-lok	Star Runner	
2004 (23rd)	Sammo Hung	The Medallion	
2005 (24th)	Yuen Woo-ping	Kung Fu Hustle	
2005 (24th)	Jackie Chan Stunt Team, Li Chung-Chi	New Police Story	
2005 (24th)	Chin Ka-lok	One Nite in Mongkok	
2005 (24th)	Yuen Bun	Throwdown	
2005 (24th)	Corey Yuen	The Twins Effect II	
2006 (25th)	Donnie Yen	SPL: Sha Po Lang	
2006 (25th)	Li Chung-Chi	Divergence	
2006 (25th)	Yuen Woo-ping, Yuen Shun-Yi, Ku Huen-chiu	House of Fury	
2006 (25th)	Jackie Chan, Stanley Tong, Richard Hung	The Myth	
2006 (25th)	Lau Kar-leung, Stephen Tung, Xiong Xin-Xin	Seven Swords	
2007 (26th)	Yuen Woo-ping	Fearless	
2007 (26th)	Stephen Tung	Battle of Wits	
2007 (26th)	Donnie Yen	Dragon Tiger Gate	
2007 (26th)	Jackie Chan, Li Chung-Chi, Jackie Chan Stunt Team	Rob-B-Hood	
2007 (26th)	Ching Siu-tung	Curse of the Golden Flower	
2008 (27th)	Donnie Yen	Flash Point	
2008 (27th)	Li Chung-Chi	Invisible Target	
2008 (27th)	Ching Siu-tung	The Warlords	
2008 (27th)	Benz Kong	Twins Mission	
2008 (27th)	Chin Ka-lok	Protégé	
2009 (28th)	Sammo Hung & Tony Leung Siu-Hung	Ip Man	
2009 (28th)	Li Chung-Chi	Connected	
2009 (28th)	Corey Yuen	Red Cliff	
2009 (28th)	Sammo Hung	Three Kingdoms: Resurrection of the Dragon	
2009 (28th)	Stephen Tung	Painted Skin	
2010 (29th)	Stephen Tung & Lee Tat Chiu	Bodyguards and Assassins	
2010 (29th)	Corey Yuen	Red Cliff II	
2010 (29th)	Ma Yuk Sing	The Storm Warriors	
2010 (29th)	Chin Ka-lok	Shinjuku Incident	
2010 (29th)	Ku Huen-chiu	14 Blades	
2011 (30th)	Sammo Hung	Ip Man 2	
2011 (30th)	Yuen Tak	Gallants	
2011 (30th)	Sammo Hung	Detective Dee and the Mystery of the Phantom Flame	
2011 (30th)	Donnie Yen	Legend of the Fist: The Return of Chen Zhen	
2011 (30th)	Stephen Tung	Reign of Assassins	
2012 (31st)	Yuen Bun, Lan Hai Han, Sun Jiankui	Flying Swords of Dragon Gate	
2012 (31st)	Ching Siu-tung	The Sorcerer and the White Snake	
2012 (31st)	Donnie Yen	Wu Xia	
2012 (31st)	Corey Yuen, Yuen Tak, Li Chung Chi	Shaolin	
2012 (31st)	Sit Chun Wai, Li Chung Chi	Let the Bullets Fly	
2013 (32nd)	Jackie Chan & He Jun	CZ12	
2013 (32nd)	Sammo Hung	Tai Chi 0	
2013 (32nd)	Chin Ka-lok, Wong Wai Fai, Ng Hoi Tong	Motorway	
2013 (32nd)	Dante Lam Chiu-Yin, Chin Ka-lok, Wong Wai Fai, Ng Hoi Tong	The Viral Factor	
2013 (32nd)	Chin Ka-lok & Wong Wai Fai	Cold War	
2014 (33rd)	Yuen Woo-ping	The Grandmaster	
2014 (33rd)	Yuen Bun, Lin Feng	Young Detective Dee: Rise of the Sea Dragon	
2014 (33rd)	Chin Ka-lok	Firestorm	
2014 (33rd)	Donnie Yen	Special ID	
2014 (33rd)	Ling Chi Wah	Unbeatable	
2015 (34th)	Donnie Yen, Stephen Tung, Yuen Bun, Yan Hua	Kung Fu Jungle	
2015 (34th)	Ku Huen-chiu	The Four III	
2015 (34th)	Stephen Tung	The White Haired Witch of Lunar Kingdom	
2015 (34th)	Yuen Woo-ping	Once Upon a Time in Shanghai	
2015 (34th)	Corey Yuen	Rise of the Legend	
2016 (35th)	Li Chung Chi	SPL II: A Time for Consequences (aka Kill Zone 2)	
2016 (35th)	Jackie Chan and JC Stunt Team	Dragon Blade	
2016 (35th)	Chin Ka-lok	Helios	
2016 (35th)	Yuen Bun	The Taking of Tiger Mountain	
2016 (35th)	Yuen Woo Ping	Ip Man 3	
2017 (36th)	Stephen Tung	Operation Mekong	
2017 (36th)	Yuen Bun, Dion Lam	Sword Master	
2017 (36th)	Sammo Hung	Call of Heroes	
2017 (36th)	Chin Ka-lok	Cold War 2	
2017 (36th)	Sammo Hung	The Monkey King 2	
2018 (37th)	Sammo Hung	Paradox	
2018 (37th)	Li Chung-chi	The Brink	
2018 (37th)	Yuen Cheung-yan, Yuen Shun-yi	The Thousand Faces of Dunjia	
2018 (37th)	Ku Huen-chiu	Wu Kong	
2018 (37th)	Yu Kang, Yuen Bun, Yan Hua	Chasing the Dragon	
2019 (38th)	Dante Lam	Operation Red Sea	
2019 (38th)	Lin Feng	Detective Dee: The Four Heavenly Kings	
2019 (38th)	Chin Ka-lok, Alan Ng, Tang Sui Wa	Golden Job	
2019 (38th)	Li Chung Chi	Project Gutenberg	
2019 (38th)	Yuen Shun-yi	Master Z: The Ip Man Legacy	
2020 (39th)	Yuen Woo-ping	Ip Man 4	
2020 (39th)	Jack Wong Wai Leung	A Witness Out of the Blue	
2020 (39th)	Chin Ka-lok, Ka-lok Stunt Team, Wong Wai Fai, Tang Sui Wa, Thomson Ng	Line Walker 2: Invisible Spy	
2020 (39th)	Stephen Tung	Double World	
2020 (39th)	Hon Ping, Gobi Ng	The White Storm 2: Drug Lords	
2022 (40th)	Donnie Yen, Ku Huen-chiu, Kenji Tanigaki, Li Chung Chi	Raging Fire	
2022 (40th)	Leung Pok Yan	One Second Champion	
2022 (40th)	Tang Sui Wa	Hand Rolled Cigarette	
2022 (40th)	Li Chung Chi	Shock Wave 2	
2022 (40th)	Jack Wong Wai Leung	Limbo	
2023 (41st)	Jack Wong Wai Leung	Warriors of Future	
2023 (41st)	Sammo Hung, Jimmy Hung, Yuen Woo-ping	Septet: The Story of Hong Kong	
2023 (41st)	Lin Feng, Stephen Tung	The Battle at Lake Changjin II	
2023 (41st)	Wong Chi Man	Where the Wind Blows	
2023 (41st)	Jack Wong Wai Leung	Detective vs Sleuths	
2024 (42nd)	Stephen Tung	Bursting Point	
2024 (42nd)	Kenji Tanigaki, Yan Hua	Sakra	
2024 (42nd)	Jack Wong Wai Leung	Mad Fate	
2024 (42nd)	Li Chung-chi	The White Storm 3: Heaven or Hell	
2024 (42nd)	Chin Ka-lok	I Did It My Way	
2025 (43rd)	Kenji Tanigaki	Twilight of the Warriors: Walled In	
2025 (43rd)	Kong Tao Hai, Tommy Leung	Stuntman	
2025 (43rd)	Jack Wong Wai Leung	The Last Dance	
2025 (43rd)	Jack Wong Wai Leung	Cesium Fallout	
2025 (43rd)	Takahito Ouchi	The Prosecutor	
2026 (44th)	Su Hang	The Shadow's Edge	
2026 (44th)	Jack Wong Wai Leung	Golden Boy	
2026 (44th)	Tang Sui Wa, Xiong Xinxin	Sons of the Neon Night	
2026 (44th)	Sammo Hung	Back to the Past	
2026 (44th)	Ken Law	Good Game	

== See also ==
- Hong Kong Film Award
- Hong Kong Film Award for Best Actor
- Hong Kong Film Award for Best Actress
- Hong Kong Film Award for Best Supporting Actor
- Hong Kong Film Award for Best Supporting Actress
- Hong Kong Film Award for Best Cinematography
- Hong Kong Film Award for Best Director
- Hong Kong Film Award for Best Film
- Hong Kong Film Award for Best New Performer
