= The Thousand Faces of Dunjia =

2017 Hong Kong-Chinese film by Yuen Woo-ping

- Film poster
- Chinese: 奇門遁甲
- Directed by: Yuen Woo-ping
- Screenplay by: Tsui Hark
- Produced by: Nansun Shi; Wei Junzi; Huang Yonghui
- Starring: Da Peng; Ni Ni; Aarif Rahman; Zhou Dongyu; Wu Bai; Liu Yan
- Cinematography: Choi Sung-Fai
- Edited by: Tsui Hark; Li Lin
- Music by: Li Ye; Tsui Hark
- Production companies: Le Vision Pictures; Acme Image; Beijing Jinhui Yinghua Entertainment; Star Century Picture
- Distributed by: Aeon Pix Studios
- Release date: 15 December 2017
- Running time: 113 minutes
- Countries: Hong Kong; China
- Language: Mandarin

The Thousand Faces of Dunjia (Chinese: 奇門遁甲) is a 2017 fantasy-wuxia film directed by Yuen Woo-ping; scripted and produced by Tsui Hark. The film is a Hong Kong-Chinese co-production and stars Da Peng, Aarif Lee, Ni Ni, Wu Bai, and Zhou Dongyu.

== Plot ==
The film follows a group of swordsmen's adventures to secretly protect humankind by hunting mysterious creatures from outer space.

== Cast ==
- Da Peng as Zhuge Qingyun
- Ni Ni as Metal Dragonfly
- Aarif Rahman as Dao Yichang
- Zhou Dongyu as Xiao Yuan
- Wu Bai as Boss
- Liu Yan
- Tiger Xu
- Yang Yiwei
- Mo Tse
- Sun Mingming
- Zhang Yiqian

== Awards and nominations ==
| Awards | Category | Nominee | Results | Ref. |
|---|---|---|---|---|
| 12th Asian Film Awards | Best Action Film | The Thousand Faces of Dunjia | Nominated | |
| 12th Asian Film Awards | Best Costume Design | The Thousand Faces of Dunjia | Nominated | |
| 12th Asian Film Awards | Best Visual Effects | The Thousand Faces of Dunjia | Nominated | |
| 37th Hong Kong Film Awards | Best Action Choreography | Yuen Cheung-yan, Yuen Shun-yi | Nominated | |
| 37th Hong Kong Film Awards | Best Visual Effects | Jang Seong-ho, Park Young-soo, Son Oh-young | Nominated | |

== Reception ==
The film has received poor reviews. It has a 33% score on Rotten Tomatoes.

Variety called it "bloated with visual effects" and said "lacks the intellectual grounding or cinematic oomph that made better works like The Taking of Tiger Mountain more than mere spectacles." RogerEbert.com gave the film two stars calling it "unnecessarily busy." The Hollywood Reporter described it as "A peppy but generic fantasy with action too reliant on CG."
