= Red Wolf (disambiguation) =

Red wolf can refer to:

== Animals ==
- Canis rufus, a canine species native to the southeastern United States
- Cuon alpinus, also called Dhole or mountain wolf, a canine species native to South, East and Southeast Asia

== Arts and entertainment ==
- Red Wolf (comics), a Marvel Comics character
- Red Wolf (film), a 1995 Hong Kong film directed by Yuen Woo-ping
- The Red Wolf, a 2003 novel by Liza Marklund

== Military ==
- HSC-84 "Red Wolves", a former United States Navy Reserve helicopter squadron
- Red Wolves, a group of Qutaibi fighters during the Aden Emergency in what is now Yemen

== Sports ==
- Red Wolf (bull) #112 (1988–2006), a bucking bull of the year
- Arkansas State Red Wolves, the teams of Arkansas State University
- Chattanooga Red Wolves, a professional soccer team in Chattanooga, Tennessee
- Florence RedWolves (now Florence Flamingos), a South Carolina amateur baseball team
- Shaanxi Red Wolves, a Chinese women's professional basketball team
