= Gao Xiong =

Gao Xiong may refer to:

- Kaohsiung, or Gaoxiong, city in Taiwan
- Eddy Ko (born 1937), or Gao Xiong, Hong Kong actor
