= Red Wolf (film) =

1995 Hong Kong film by Yuen Woo-ping

- Film poster
- 魔神威龍
- Directed by: Yuen Woo-ping; Tsui Siu-ming (uncredited)
- Screenplay by: Ricky Ng
- Produced by: Yeung Ka-on
- Starring: Kenny Ho; Christy Chung; Ngai Sing; Lui Siu-ling; Ng Sin-si
- Cinematography: Ma Koon-wah
- Edited by: Cheng Keung
- Music by: Tang Siu-lam
- Production companies: Regal Films Co. Ltd. Long Shong Pictures (H.K.) Limited
- Distributed by: Golden Harvest
- Release date: 18 May 1995 (Hong Kong)
- Running time: 92 minutes
- Country: Hong Kong
- Language: Cantonese
- Box office: HK$1,348,775

Red Wolf (Chinese: 魔神威龍), also known as The Red Wolf or The Red-Wolf, is a 1995 Hong Kong martial arts film directed by Yuen Woo-ping.

== Plot ==
A luxury liner is hijacked by pirates who seek to steal uranium from its cargo. Alan, the security guard on board, fights the pirates to foil their plans.

== Cast ==
- Kenny Ho as Alan
- Christy Chung as Lai
- Ngai Sing as Tong San
- Lui Siu-ling as Elaine Wong
- Ng Sin-si as Sisi
- Cho Wing as Terrorist
- Wu Fung as Mr. Wu
- Mary Hon as Mrs. Wu
- Michael Lai as Cruise emcee
- Chan Chi-man as David
- Tam Suk-mui as Sandy
- Yuen Cheung-yan as Cruise passenger
- Steve Brettingham as Cruise captain
- Roy Filler as Jake
- Mike Miller as Michael / musical terrorist
- Robert Samuels as Bobby / drummer
- Habby Heske as Terrorist / bass player
- Pan Yung-sheng as Terrorist
- Wong Wai-leung as Terrorist
- Jackson Ng as Terrorist
- Tsim Siu-ling as Terrorist
- Choi Kwok-ping as Terrorist
- Choi Kwok-keung as Terrorist
- Hon Ping as Terrorist
- Lee Kin-kwan as Terrorist
- So Wai-nam as Thief
- Lam Kwok-kit as Cruise security
- Chan Gin-chi as Terrorist
- Lam Kwok-wah as Cruise passenger
- Ng Kwok-shing as Cruise passenger

The director's brother Yuen Cheung-yan appears as a cruise passenger.

== Production ==
Director Yuen Woo-ping, Cho Wing, and the director's brother Yuen Cheung-yan are credited as the action directors.

== Release ==
The film had a brief run in Hong Kong from 18 to 22 May 1995, earning HK$1,348,775.

== Reception ==
Many reviewers noted Red Wolf's similarity to Under Siege and Die Hard.

Reviewer Phil Mills of fareastfilms.com gave the film a rating of 3 out of 5 stars, writing, "Thankfully, Woo-Ping's experience does at least pay off in the action department and this is where the film earns its stars. While it is by no means his finest hour, there are some good bouts of combat that are highly inventive and make good use of the setting. [...] While it remains watchable, 'Red Wolf' really suffers from its own inability to create anything fresh. The action is okay and the story passes the time, but the lack of any real stand-out moments just leaves the viewer constantly wanting something more. If it's terrorists wreaking havoc on a boat that you seek then I would recommend you check out 'City Hunter' instead."

Reviewer Andrew Skeates of fareastfilms.com wrote, "This 1995 offering from the legendary Yuen Woo-ping may be somewhat minor compared to some of his other greatest hits but 'Red Wolf' is a barnstorming modern day set kung fu actioner that Hong Kong used to do so well in the 90s. Basically a Hong Kong version of 'Under Siege' but much more fun thanks to the impressive bootwork on show."

Reviewer Ben Johnson of kungfumovieguide.com gave the film a rating of 3 out of 5 stars, writing, "This might not be an essential watch – it’s certainly not up there with the best of what Woo-ping has provided in such an illustrious career – but it’s also hard to dislike a movie so unashamedly crowd-pleasing."

Reviewer Cherycok of darksidereviews.com gave the film a rating of 6.5 out of 10, writing, "One thing is for sure when you see Yuen Woo-Ping in the choreography, it's that you're pretty sure that in terms of action scenes we should have something good. And that's indeed the case! Helped by his brother Yuen Cheung-Yan but also by the super kicker Cho Wing, the many action scenes are the main asset of the film. Fast, nervous, we witness a festival of superb punches and sequences where the cables are very little used and where the stuntmen really take it in the face (really, we feel bad for them...). And even if Kenny Ho is not a martial artist strictly speaking, it's clear that he does really well, sometimes doing a few stunts himself."

Reviewer Kozo of lovehkfilm.com wrote, "Yuen Woo-Ping directed this fun action movie that entertains despite having zero in the way of story, character or acting. [...] This movie won't make anybody forget Fist of Legend, or possibly even High Risk, but it's decent throwaway fun."

Reviewer LP Hugo of asianfilmstrike gave the film a rating of 3 stars, writing, "Kenny Ho sounds like a strange choice for an action hero, and he's not exactly a charismatic or even imposing presence, but he acquits himself surprisingly well in the fight scenes, not even paling in comparison with the excellent Collin Chou, who plays the leader of the terrorists. Still, the real hissable villain and only really memorable character is Elaine Lui as Chou's blood-thirsty companion, who in the beginning poses as a singer. She embodies the film’s best assets : brutal action and an unforgiving spin. The very, very beautiful Christy Chung on the other, is saddled with the comic relief role of a pickpocket who assists and (unwittingly) hampers Kenny Ho's rescue in equal parts. [...] Die Hard on a boat, or Speed 2 on another boat, depending on whether one is a glass-half-full or glass-half-empty kind of person, Red Wolf is unoriginal but it’s still a hard-hitting, unforgiving little action film."

Reviewer Tars Tarkas gave the film a rating of 4 out of 10, writing, "I will never understand some of the turns this movie took. I can imagine they were writing the script as they went along, working around the various stunt shots Yuen Woo Ping planned, but it still jumps around, logic is leaped like Superman over tall buildings, and lots and lots of people die thanks to the actions of the hero, who we are supposed to be sympathetic to."

The review on crichtonsworld.com reads, "Since this a Yuen Woo-Ping film you can count on the action being top notch. For the most part it certainly is effective and exciting. But it does underwhelm a little towards the end where the fights with the main baddies should have been more impressive."

The review on outlawvern.com reads, "It's far from Yuen's best directorial work, but of course it has some very good action in it, and I can't help but enjoy seeing him inject his style into a favorite subgenre of American action."

Reviewer Reefer of cityonfire.com wrote, "this widely under-rated, if not totally unknown, 1995 Yuen Woo Ping directed film is just about wall-to-wall action and some of it is quite spectacular."
