= Billy Chow =

Hong Kong actor and kickboxer

- Born: Bei-lei Chow; August 24, 1958 (age 68); Hong Kong
- Occupations: Actor, entrepreneur, kickboxer, martial artist
- Years active: 1984–present
- Martial arts career
- Style: Kickboxing
- Stance: Orthodox
- Trainer: Frank Lee
- Years active: 1977–1992, 2007

Kickboxing record
- Total: 53
- Wins: 45
- By knockout: 32
- Losses: 8

Chinese name
- Traditional Chinese: 週比利
- Simplified Chinese: 周比利
Transcriptions
Standard Mandarin
- Hanyu Pinyin: Zhōu Bǐ Lì
Yue: Cantonese
- Jyutping: Zau1 Bei2 Lei6

Billy Chow Bei-lei (Chinese: 周比利; born August 24, 1958) is a Hong Kong-Canadian former professional kickboxer and actor. He competed in the Welterweight and Super Welterweight divisions from 1977 to 1992. He was the WKA Super Welterweight champion from 1984 to 1986, and retired with a professional record of 45-0-8.

Chow is known to film audiences for his roles in several Hong Kong martial arts films, including as General Fujita in the 1994 Jet Li film Fist of Legend (1994), and Wong in the 1996 film Tai Chi Boxer (1996).

== Biography ==
=== Early life ===
Chow was born in Hong Kong in 1958, and was later raised in Calgary, Alberta, Canada and Hong Kong. He began training in martial arts, initially karate, at the age of 11. He was inspired by Bruce Lee's 1971 film The Big Boss. In 1976, he moved back to Canada for school, where he met Grandmaster Frank Lee in Edmonton, under whom he studied Tibetan White Crane kung fu, boxing, American kickboxing, and Muay Thai.

=== Kickboxing ===
Chow began competing professionally in 1977. In 1982, he won the Canadian Welterweight Championship. He was the WKA Super Welterweight Champion of the world from 1984 to 1986.

His final match was on November 20, 2007, in which he lost via decision to Akarn Sanehha of Thailand.

He currently trains fighters out of Billy's Gym in Hong Kong, and Frank Lee's Muay Thai in Edmonton.

=== Acting career ===
In the 1980s, Chow played an elite soldier in the 1987 film Eastern Condors alongside Sammo Hung, Yuen Biao and Yuen Woo-ping. Chow played thugs in two Jackie Chan movies: Dragons Forever in 1988, and Miracles in 1989.

In the 1990s, Chow had roles in three Jet Li movies: Fist of Legend in 1994 as General Fujita, Meltdown in 1995 as Kong, and Dr. Wai in "The Scripture with No Words" in 1996 as Chan / Japanese Embassy Guard. Chow played Jade Tiger's Brother in the 1995 film Iron Monkey 2 along with Donnie Yen. Chow played Wong, Great Kick of the North in the 1996 film Tai Chi Boxer along with Jacky Wu.

On August 26, 2006, Chow retired from acting at the age of 48, after his final film, Dragon in Fury.

== Filmography ==
=== Movies ===
- Winner Takes All (1984)
- City Hero (1985)
- Eastern Condors (1987)
- Her Vengeance (1988)
- Dragons Forever (1988)
- Paper Marriage (1988)
- Pedicab Driver (1989)
- Miracles (1989)
- Into the Fire (1989)
- Blonde Fury (1989)
- When Fortune Smiles (1990)
- Triad Story (1990)
- Middle Man (1990)
- Magic Cop (1990)
- Licence to Steal (1990)
- Touch and Go (1991)
- Robotrix (1991)
- Queen's High (1991)
- The Gambling Ghost (1991)
- All Mighty Gambler (1991)
- Wizard's Curse (1992)
- Secret Police (1992)
- Kickboxer's Tears (1992)
- Escape from Brothel (1992)
- Beauty Investigator (1992)
- The Street Car Named Desire (1993)
- Future Cops (1993)
- Once Upon a Time in China IV (1993)
- Bloodshed in Nightery (1993)
- Romance of the Vampire (1994)
- Rock on Fire (1994)
- Out Bound Killing (1994)
- My Friend Roy (1994)
- Gambling Baron (1994)
- Fist of Legend (1994)
- Tough Beauty and the Sloppy Slop (1995)
- Iron Monkey 2 (1995)
- Meltdown (1995)
- Yes Madam 5 (1996)
- Horrible High Heels (1996)
- Dr. Wai in "The Scripture with No Words" (1996)
- Tai Chi Boxer (1996)
- Another Chinese Cop (1996)
- 18 Shaolin Golden Boy (1996)
- Tough Guy (1997)
- Tiger Angels (1997)
- Super Cops (1997)
- Crazy Mission (1997)
- 97 Aces Go Places (1997)
- Young and Dangerous 5 (1998)
- Roller Blade Killer (1998)
- Fatal Desire (1998)
- Death Games (1998)
- The Wanted Convict (1999)
- Undercover Girls (1999)
- City of Darkness (1999)
- Unbeatables (2000)
- Stand in Between (2000)
- The King Boxer (2000)
- Gei Xiao Jie Bao Biao (2000)
- Mabangis na Lungsod
- Camouflage (2000)
- Vampire Hunter D: Bloodlust (2000)
- Dragon the Master (2002)
- Star Runner (2003)
- Xiao Tai Ji (2004)
- Hero Youngster (2004)
- Roaring Dragon, Bluffing Tiger (2006)
- Dragon in Fury (2006)

=== Television ===
- 101 Arrest Warrant III: Brave New World(1984)
- Monk with a flower(1997)
- Tai Chi Grandmaster(1998)
- New Shaolin Temple(1999)
