= Yuen Shun Yi =

Yuen Shun Yi may refer to:

- Yuen Shun-yi (袁信義), a Hong Kong film actor, stuntman and action coordinator
- Yuen Siu-tien (袁小田) (1912-1979), a Hong Kong martial arts film actor
