= The Miracle Fighters =

1982 Hong Kong film by Yuen Woo-ping

- Film poster
- Traditional Chinese: 奇門遁甲
- Simplified Chinese: 奇门遁甲
- Hanyu Pinyin: Qí Mén Dùn Jiǎ
- Jyutping: Kei4 Mun4 Deon6 Gaap3
- Directed by: Yuen Woo-ping
- Written by: Peace Group
- Produced by: Leonard Ho; Raymond Chow
- Starring: Bryan Leung; Yuen Cheung-yan; Yuen Yat-cho
- Cinematography: Ma Koon-wah
- Edited by: Peter Cheung
- Music by: Tang Siu-lam
- Production company: Peace Film Production (HK) Co.
- Distributed by: Golden Harvest
- Release date: 23 July 1982
- Running time: 99 minutes
- Country: Hong Kong
- Language: Cantonese
- Box office: HK$8,482,128

The Miracle Fighters (Chinese: 奇門遁甲; pinyin: Qí Mén Dùn Jiǎ; Jyutping: Kei4 Mun4 Deon6 Gaap3; lit. 'Mysterious Gates Escape Technique') is a 1982 Hong Kong martial arts fantasy comedy film directed by Yuen Woo-ping and starring Bryan Leung, Yuen Cheung-yan and Yuen Yat-cho. The film's action sequences features various elements of fantasy, including magic. It was followed by two thematic sequels, Shaolin Drunkard (1983) and Taoism Drunkard (1984), which are similar in style with unrelated storylines.

== Plot ==
During the Qing Dynasty, Han Chinese and Manchu people were not allowed to marry each other. After he is found to have taken a Han wife, the Emperor commands Manchu soldier Ko Hung (Eddy Ko) to kill her. When he refuses, he has to see his wife executed by soldiers. Ko Hung engages in a battle with the guards, and faces the powerful Sorcerer Bat (Yuen Shun-yi). Ko Hung takes the child prince hostage and flees the palace, but discovers during his escape that he has accidentally suffocated the prince to death.

Ko Hung soon finds an infant under a tree. He adopts the boy and names him "Shu-kan", which is literally translated as "Tree Root". To cover up what he has done, he puts the prince's jade medallion on Shu-kan. Over a decade later, Sorcerer Bat discovers a drunken Ko and tries to kill him; during the battle Ko is blinded by an assassin’s poison powder. Shu-kan attempts to find medicine to cure Ko’s blindness, and meets two elderly Taoist priests, Kei-moon (Bryan Leung) and Tun-kap (Yuen Cheung-yan). Kei-moon and Tun-kap are disciples of the same master (Yuen Siu-tien), and are always quarreling with each other. Shu-Kan is able to cure Ko, who tries to drive him away to protect him; however Bat catches up with them, kills Ko, and kidnaps Shu-kan. To pass him off as the prince and control the throne, Bat tattoos the royal insignia on Shu-Kan’s foot, but he is able to escape the palace while befriending a strange monster creature living in a jar.

Returning to the priests, the two teach Shu-kan their martial arts and magic skills. The Sorcerer Bat and his assassin disciples try hard to get rid of the two to get Shu-kan, but later he manages to kill Tun-kap. Kei-moon then tells Shu-kan to enter a sorcerer’s competition to obtain the “Supreme Command”. Shu-kan, using the skills he learned, enters the competition and goes through many different obstacles before he faces off with the Sorcerer Bat. He eventually kills the Sorcerer Bat, wins the competition and brings the supreme command with him. As he returns, he and Kei-moon discover that Tun-kap actually faked her death to fool them to obtain the Supreme Command. The two elders then quarrel again over the Supreme Command, deciding who will take it in a game of rock paper scissors. First, they both hand gesture "rock", then "paper" but Shu-kan gestures "scissors" and beats them both. With the Supreme Command, Shu-kan orders them to stop quarreling.

== Cast ==
Cast	Role
Bryan Leung	Kei-moon / Old Man 奇門
Yuen Cheung-yan	Tun-kap / Old Woman 遁甲
Yuen Yat-cho	Shu-kan 樹根
Eddy Ko	Ko Hung 高雄
Yuen Shun-yi	Sorcerer Bat 蝙蝠法師
Brandy Yuen	Clown in the jar 罈子裡的人
Huang Ha	Rainmaker
Tino Wong	One of Sorcerer Bat's men 蝙蝠法師手下
Yuen Siu-tien	Master 師父

== Production ==
According to assistant director Fish Fong, "maybe over 20,000" snakes were used for the film, and most of them died because of the dry ice used in a scene towards the end suffocating them.

== Critical reception ==
Rick Baker and Ken Miller give the film a positive write-up, stating that it is "one of the most original, inventive and well-directed comedy-kung-fu movies ever".

== Award nomination ==
- 2nd Hong Kong Film Awards
  - Nominated: Best Action Choreography (Yuen Woo-ping, Brandy Yuen, Yuen Shun-yee, Yuen Cheung-yan, Yuen Yat-cho, Chiu Chung-hing)
