= The Postman Strikes Back =

1982 Hong Kong film by Ronny Yu

- Film poster
- Traditional Chinese: 巡城馬
- Simplified Chinese: 巡城马
- Hanyu Pinyin: Xún Chéng Mǎ
- Jyutping: Cheon4 Sing4 Maa2
- Directed by: Ronny Yu
- Written by: Ronny Yu; Chan Kiu-ying; Koo Siu-wah; Yau-tai On-ping
- Produced by: Raymond Chow
- Starring: Bryan Leung; Chow Yun-fat; Fan Mei-sheng; Yuen Yat-cho; Eddy Ko; Cherie Chung; Kuk Ching-suk
- Cinematography: Cheung Yiu-cho; Danny Lee; Brian Lai
- Edited by: Peter Cheung
- Music by: Tang Siu-lam
- Production companies: Paragon Films; Peace Film Production
- Distributed by: Golden Harvest
- Release date: 4 June 1982
- Running time: 88 minutes
- Country: Hong Kong
- Language: Cantonese
- Box office: HK$3.4 million

The Postman Strikes Back (alternative known title as The Postman Fights Back in the United Kingdom) is a 1982 Hong Kong martial arts film directed by Ronny Yu, and starring Bryan Leung as the titular protagonist who is sent on a mission to deliver a cargo of four mysterious cases to a rebel leader. The film co-stars Chow Yun-fat, Fan Mei-sheng, Yuen Yat-cho, Eddy Ko, Cherie Chung, and Kuk Ching-suk.

== Cast ==
Cast	Role
Bryan Leung	Courier Ma
Chow Yun-fat	Fu Jun
Fan Mei-sheng	Bu
Yuen Yat-cho	Yao Jie
Eddy Ko	Hsu
Cherie Chung	Guifa
Kuk Ching-suk	Li Fu
Yeung Wai	bandit on horse (cameo)
Chiang Cheng	mine boss
Lee Fat-yuen	bandit
Kwon Il-soo	Jiao Long
Hui Ying-sau	Uncle San
