= Dreadnaught (film) =

1981 Hong Kong film by Yuen Woo-ping

- Film poster
- Directed by: Yuen Woo-ping
- Screenplay by: Peace Group
- Story by: Wong Jing
- Produced by: Raymond Chow
- Starring: Yuen Biao; Bryan Leung; Kwan Tak-hing
- Cinematography: Ma Koon-wah
- Edited by: Peter Cheung
- Music by: Frankie Chan
- Production company: Golden Harvest
- Distributed by: Golden Harvest
- Release date: 5 March 1981
- Running time: 91 minutes
- Country: Hong Kong
- Language: Cantonese
- Box office: HK$5,618,598

Dreadnaught (Chinese: 勇者無懼; lit. 'Brave', 'No Fear') is a 1981 Hong Kong martial arts comedy horror film directed by Yuen Woo-ping, and produced by Raymond Chow. The film stars Yuen Biao, Bryan Leung, and Kwan Tak-hing. The film was released theatrically in Hong Kong on 5 March 1981.

In the film, the fugitive criminal White Tiger systematically kills anyone who threatens or angers him. With the exception of the laundry man Mousy, who keeps evading his attacks. Eventually, Mousy uses his kung-fu skills to fight back and defeat White Tiger.

== Plot ==
A short-tempered, violent criminal named White Tiger is on the run from the police and joins a theater troupe to hide out, killing anyone who angers him or who suspects his identity. One person he unsuccessfully tries to kill several times is a cowardly laundry man named Mousy, who manages to escape by fleeing.

In a scene early on in the film, Mousy is washing the laundry with his bossy sister. After complaining about the repetitiveness of laundry work, his sister scolds him and demands he wash the clothes in the "family way." This leads to a scene with Mousy flipping the clothes around with his hands and wringing them out with powerful squeezing from his index finger and middle finger.

When Mousy's close friend and elder brother figure, Leung Foon, is killed by White Tiger, Mousy overcomes his cowardliness enough to seek revenge.

The laundry abilities turn out to be related to kung-fu methods. In the climax Mousy faces off against white Tiger one final time and by combining his strength and rage he eventually kills white Tiger.

== Cast ==
- Yuen Biao as Mousy
- Bryan Leung as Leung Foon
- Kwan Tak-hing as Wong Fei-hung
- Philip Ko as Tam King
- Yuen Shun-yee as White Tiger
- Lily Li as Mousy's sister
- Tong Ching as Mousy's love interest
- Fan Mei-sheng as Marshal Pao
- Brandy Yuen as Marshal's assistant
- Yuen Cheung-yan as Marshal's assistant
- Fung Hak-on as Demon Tailor
- Danny Chow as Gorgeous Koon
- Chiu Chi-hing as Chai
- San Kuai as Iron Swallow
- Yuen Lung-kui
- Yuen Qiu as White Tiger's wife
- Lee Chun-wah as Biggie (Big Mouth)
- Yue Tau-wan as Snake Tongue
- Fung Ging-man as Man who opens Opera House
- Sai Gwa-Pau as Wong Fei-hung's servant
- Cheung Chok-chow as Mayor at Wong's party
- Lee Fat-yuen as Molestor
- Tsui Oi-sam as Gorgeous Koon's fan
- Ho Tin-shing as Boss Huang's servant
- Fung Ming
- Sa Au as Taoist
- Yuen Woo-ping as extra
- Man Ngai-tik
- Ho Po-sing
- Yeung Wah
- To Wing-leung
- Siu Tak-foo
- To Wai-wo

== See also ==
- List of Hong Kong films of 1981
- Yuen Biao filmography
