= The Champions (1983 film) =

1983 Hong Kong film by Brandy Yuen

- Theatrical release poster
- Traditional Chinese: 波牛
- Simplified Chinese: 波牛
- Hanyu Pinyin: Bō Niú
- Jyutping: Bo1 Ngau4
- Directed by: Brandy Yuen
- Screenplay by: Brandy Yuen
- Produced by: Raymond Chow
- Starring: Yuen Biao; Cheung Kwok-keung; Dick Wei; Moon Lee; Eddy Ko
- Cinematography: Ma Koon-wa; Kenneth Sung
- Edited by: Peter Cheung
- Music by: Blue Max Productions; Lam Miu-tak; Richard Lam
- Production companies: Paragon Films; Peace Film Production (HK)
- Distributed by: Golden Harvest
- Release date: 13 October 1983
- Running time: 94 minutes
- Country: Hong Kong
- Language: Cantonese
- Box office: HK$3,206,327

The Champions (Chinese: 波牛) is a 1983 Hong Kong sports comedy film written and directed by Brandy Yuen. The film stars Yuen Biao, Cheung Kwok-keung, Dick Wei, Moon Lee, and Eddy Ko.

== Synopsis ==
Lee Tung (Yuen Biao) is taunted by rival football teams. At first he is just a ball boy and a punch bag for the leading villain, King (Dick Wei). But after too many beatings, Tung decides to play for another local team and to go against King in a one-off football match at the end. The film also tackles problems of jealousy, corruption and bullying in sports.

== Cast ==
- Yuen Biao as Lee Tung
- Cheung Kwok-keung as Suen
- Dick Wei as King
- Moon Lee as Fanny
- Eddy Ko as Tung's Uncle
- Cheung King-po as King's assistant
- Kam Biu as Soccer bets syndicate's boss
- Tong Tin-hei as Seng Sun Team's boss
- Tino Wong as 3rd Master
- Ho Pak-kwong as 3rd Master's assistant
- Fung King-man as Village contest's emcee
- Yue Tau-wan as Social soccer player
- Brandy Yuen as Man who helps buy betting tickets
- Yuen Lung-kui as Man who hits gong
- Johnny Cheung as King's soccer player
- Lee Chun-wa as Muscle man arm-wrestling with Tung
- Liu Hok-man as Pickpocket / Soccer player
- Victor Yeung as Soccer spectator
- Yeung Wai as Jogger (cameo)
- Lee Fat-yuen as 3rd Master's thug
- To Siu-ming as Pool attendee
- Ho Tin-shing as Chuen
- Sin Yuk-lung as Participant at village contest
- Yeung Wah as Participant at village contest
- Ho Wah
- Lung Ying
- Sa Au
- Man Ngai-tik
- Leung Hung
- Ernest Mauser as VIP at soccer stadium opening
- Benny Lai as King's soccer player
- Ko Hung as Social soccer player
- Chan Leung as Soccer player
- Sham Chin-po as Social soccer player

== Critical response ==
Variety applauded the film's "impeccably-choreographed action sequences" while also acknowledging that "the storyline (the underdogs make good) and acting are secondary", with only the final football match being criticized for taking place "in some obscure sand lot that truly weakens the impact."

== Accolades ==
In 1985, the film was nominated for the Hong Kong Film Award for Best Action Choreography for Brandy Yuen and Yuen Shun-yi at the 3rd Hong Kong Film Awards.

== See also ==
- List of association football films
- List of Hong Kong films
