= Live Hard (film) =

1989 Hong Kong film by Yuen Cheung-yan

- Film poster
- Traditional Chinese: 鐵膽雄風
- Simplified Chinese: 铁胆雄风
- Hanyu Pinyin: Tiě Dǎn Xióng Fēng
- Jyutping: Tit3 Daam2 Hung4 Fung1
- Directed by: Yuen Cheung-yan
- Screenplay by: Joseph Chan
- Produced by: Lau Cheung-chu; David Chung
- Starring: Simon Yam; Elaine Lui; Lau Ching-wan; Norman Cheung; Sarah Lee; Eddy Ko; Jason Pai; Hwang Jang-lee; Stuart Ong
- Cinematography: Ma Koon-wah
- Edited by: Grand Yip
- Music by: Norman Wong
- Production company: Tung San Films
- Distributed by: Tung San Films
- Release date: 14 July 1989
- Running time: 93 minutes
- Country: Hong Kong
- Language: Cantonese
- Box office: HK$2,714,127

Live Hard is a 1989 Hong Kong action film directed by Yuen Cheung-yan and starring Simon Yam, Elaine Lui and Lau Ching-wan. There are two versions of the film: the original Hong Kong version released in Asia and an international version, which includes western actors such as Mark Houghton and Steve Tartalia.

== Plot ==
Chief, an undercover cop posing as a drug dealer, humiliates another drug dealer, Tony, by beating him and his underlings up and then sells some fake marijuana to a bar girl, Stella. Meanwhile, a terrorist organization led by Suzuki blows up a school van, which kills Mark, the son of the American consul, Mr. Robinson, who received a call from the FBI the previous night regarding the terrorists' arrival in Hong Kong. Senior Inspector Hui Tat-ming Regional Crime Unit worries the case will affect the international reputation of Hong Kong's security, but his superior officer, Superintendent Lee, informs Hui he is no longer in charge as the case has been transferred to the Special Branch, led by Chief Inspector Terry Chiu. Lee and Chiu had actually set up a secret special unit to take care of the case. Chiu later follows an Arabian firearms buyer but is caught, and he fights his henchmen who manage to escape, but Chiu picks up one of their wallets. The Arabian goes to the club where Stella works where her friend and her cousin, Yeung attempts to get intel from. However, Chief shows up at the same time and gets into a fight with Yeung while Stella encounters Tony and gets urinated on by him

At Mark's funeral, Hui arrives and attempts to ask information from Mr. Robinson, who refuses him. Hui then strikes a conversation with Catherine, Mark's cousin, who is a reporter from the New York Times. Hui later follows a suspicious criminal, Ironman, who snatches his pistol runs away from him. When Hui later discovered Ironman is an expert of electronic remote, he believes Ironman is involved in the explosion and arrests him but Lee orders Hui to release him due to lack of evidence. Later, Hero, an undercover cop posing as a taxi driver drives two female members of the terrorist organization and follows them but they beat him in a fight before fleeing. Suzuki then receives a call from his boss to bomb a supermarket.

Hui believes the case is politically influenced and asks Catherine whether Mr. Robinson told her anything about a politician coming to Hong Kong. Meanwhile, Lee and Choy briefs with the special unit, whose member include Chief, Yeung, Hero, Stella'a friend and Ironman, who is also an undercover cop, the operation to take down the terrorists. Ironman finds small-time criminal Snake Ming to bring him to arms dealer, Uncle Kwan at his yacht claiming to sell to an Arabian client. Uncle Kwan had just completed a transaction with Suzuki before Ironman arrived, but Suzuki comes back and kills Kwan. At this time, Hui arrives Suzuki and Ironman flee. Hui then abducts Ironman from his hideout and beats him while attempting to interrogate him. As a result, Hui was suspended from his duties.

Chief and Yeung encounter Tony and gang and fights them where Stella attacks Tony but is heavily injured. At the hospital, Stella expresses her love for Yeung but he rejects her because of his dangerous life, but Chief consoles her telling her about his rough childhood. Due to their failure in actions, Chiu announces they will have a new plan to take down the terrorists, who found out the US military politician will hold a meeting at the Special Duties Unit (SDU) headquarters and will assassinate him.

While dejected, Hui goes out to dinner with Catherine, who tells him the US military politician will arrive on Sunday. Afterwards, Catherine finds her car vandalised by thugs at the parking lot but she turns out to be a capable fighter and beats up the thugs. Meanwhile, Chief receives a call to arrive at the terrorists' hideout at No. 1 Austin Road while hanging out with Stella, who overheard him and follows. However, she is caught by the terrorists and the special unit attempts to save her. However, she is killed when she is kicked off the building.

Hui later finds files of the terrorists organisation and confidently calls Lee that he will solve the calls. He then goes to Catherine's home to tell her to warn Mr. Robinson of his safety. However, one of the female terrorists show up, revealing Catherine to be the mastermind behind the terrorist organization. Hui fights the female terrorist, but Catherine stabs him and throws him in the swimming pool. Catherine then goes to Chiu's officer and lures his special unit to an abandoned building of illegal immigrants from China while she and her terrorists raid the SDU headquarters, killing a number of officers. When they go into the meeting room, they find it empty and on the screen projector, a clip with Hui in front of the hospital shows up, revealing he survived the stab, where he informs them they are being surrounded. As the terrorists attempt to leave, the special units arrives on time and engages in a major fight with them. After the terrorists have been defeated, Hui arrives and reveals to Catherine that he had sent the US military politician to a safe place a week ago and the meeting went smoothly before she is arrested.

== Cast ==
- Simon Yam as Hui Tat-ming (許達明), senior inspector of the Regional Crime Unit who is very determined.
- Elaine Lui as a female operative of the special unit and is friends with Yeung and Stella.
- Lau Ching-wan as Fai (阿輝), nicknamed Chief (族長), an operative of the special unit who poses as a drug dealer. His father was a drug addict who died of a heart attack.
- Norman Cheung as Yeung (阿楊), an operative of the special unit who studied in England.
- Sarah Lee as Stella, Yeung's cousin who is a bar girl and is addicted to marijuana.
- Eddy Ko as Wong Hung (黃雄), nicknamed Ironman, an operative of the special unit who poses as a criminal.
- Jason Pai as Hero (大俠), an operative of the special unit who poses as a taxi driver
- Hwang Jang-lee as Terry Chiu (趙梁春), chief inspector of the Special Branch of the Royal Hong Kong Police Force and leader of the special unit.
- Stuart Ong as Suzuki (鈴木武夫), Catherine's second in command.
- Kim Maree Penn as Catherine, Mr. Robinson's niece who the mastermind of the terrorist organization posing as a reporter of the New York Times.
- Fairlie Ruth Kordick as female member of the terrorist organisation.
- Ng Bing
- Lam Chung as Superintendent Lee (李Sir), Hui's superior officer and organiser of the special unit.
- Tony Yip
- Ng Kim-hung
- Dan Vincent
- Chung Chi-yung
- Hon Kwok-choi as Snake Ming (蛇仔明), a small-time criminal who helps Ironman meet with Uncle Kwan
- Frank Liu as a cop.
- Lee Man-tai as Uncle Kwan (坤叔), an arms dealer.
- Dan Mintz as Tony's thug.
- Vincent Lyn as Tony's thug.
- Steve Tartila as a diplomat. (International version)
- Mark Houghton (International version)
- Lam Suet as a thug who vandalises Catherine's car.
- Ding Hai-feng
- Ken Yip (International version)
- Wong Wai-shun (International version)
- Wan Seung-lam as a guard in the SDU headquarters.
- Choi Kwok-keung
- Lung Ying
- Ha Kwok-wing

== Reception ==
=== Critical ===
The film received a score of 7.1/10 stars from the Internet Movie Database.

=== Box office ===
The film grossed HK$2,714,127 at the Hong Kong box office during its theatrical run from 14 to 20 July 1989 in Hong Kong.
