= Drunken Tai Chi =

1984 Hong Kong film by Yuen Woo-ping

- Film poster
- Traditional Chinese: 笑太極
- Simplified Chinese: 笑太极
- Hanyu Pinyin: Xiào Tài Jí
- Jyutping: Siu3 Taai3 Gik6
- Directed by: Yuen Woo-ping
- Written by: Yuen Woo-ping; Brandy Yuen; Peace Group
- Produced by: Chow Ling-kong; Wang H.W. Wang
- Starring: Donnie Yen; Yuen Cheung-yan; Yuen Shun-yi; Yuen Yat-chor; Lydia Shum; Mandy Chan; Don Wong; Lee Kwan; Chang Hsun
- Cinematography: Chan Wing-shu
- Edited by: Wong Chau-kwai; Robert Choi
- Music by: Tang Siu-lam
- Production company: Peace (Hong Kong) Film
- Distributed by: Dragons Group Film
- Release date: 31 May 1984
- Running time: 91 minutes
- Country: Hong Kong
- Language: Cantonese
- Box office: HK$6,937,773

Drunken Tai Chi is a 1984 Hong Kong martial arts action film directed by Yuen Woo-ping. It is notable for being the acting debut of Donnie Yen, who had previously performed as a stuntman. The film showcases Yen's martial arts skills as well as his b-boying abilities, including a scene in which Yen performs a moonwalk.

== Plot ==
A spoiled young man is on the run from a ruthless killer, who is tasked to kill him, his brother, and his father. Donnie Yen's character finds accommodation with a puppeteer and his heavy-set wife, who teach him the art of tai chi, the only style of martial arts that can defeat the killer.

== Cast ==
- Donnie Yen
- Yuen Cheung Yan
- Yuen Shun-yi
- Mandy Chan
- Lydia Shum
- Don Wong Tao
- Yuen Hsin Yee

== Reception ==
Reviewer Simon Rigg of kungfukingdom.com writes that while the film never reached the popularity of Drunken Master, "nevertheless it’s a great kung fu showcase in its own right. It’s an unconventional mix, featuring American crazes (skateboarding) and a killer with a very human side alongside a lot of slapstick and bawdy humour, but it’s impossible not to be taken in by Donnie and the team’s set-pieces. It holds a special place in Hong Kong film history for bringing Donnie Yen to the fore and as one of the last films to feature step-by-step intricate choreography."

The book The Encyclopedia of Martial Arts Movies by Bill Palmer, Karen Palmer, and Ric Meyers calls the film a "commonplace, simple story of revenge with humorous touches", noting its "great kung fu! The Yuen family is listed as the fight choreographers, and that usually means a cornucopia of visual effects and breathtaking martial arts. They don't let us down here." The film is given a rating of 3 1/2 stars.

Review-aggregation website Rotten Tomatoes gives the film a score of 65%.
