= The Thundering Mantis =

1980 Hong Kong film by Teddy Yip

- Film poster
- Traditional Chinese: 癲螳螂
- Simplified Chinese: 癲螳螂
- Hanyu Pinyin: Diān Táng Láng
- Jyutping: Din1 Tong4 Long4
- Directed by: Teddy Yip
- Screenplay by: Cheung San-yee
- Produced by: Stanley Chow
- Starring: Bryan Leung; Cheng Feng; Eddy Ko Hung
- Cinematography: Cheung Tak-kon
- Edited by: Wong Chau-kwai; Cheung Kwok-kuen
- Music by: Stanley Chow
- Production companies: Goldig Films (H.K.) Ltd. East Asia (H.K.) Film Co.
- Distributed by: Goldig Films (H.K.) Ltd. (Hong Kong)
- Release date: 3 January 1980 (Hong Kong)
- Running time: 85 minutes
- Country: Hong Kong
- Language: Cantonese

The Thundering Mantis (Chinese: 癲螳螂) (Also known as Mantis Fist Fighter in USA) is a 1980 Hong Kong martial arts action film directed by Teddy Yip, starring Bryan Leung, Cheng Feng and Eddy Ko Hung.

== Plot ==
A martial artist Ah Chi (Bryan Leung) who often gets in trouble while goofing around gets in trouble as he is saving the neighborhood. He later then meets a crafty kid and finds out that the kid's uncle is the thundering mantis-style master. Curiously, Chi goes off to challenge him and the uncle wins without trying. Later on, he comes against the Jade gang whom he easily beats but soon he is up against Hsia (Eddy Ko) the master of the gang. Humiliatingly, Hsia beats up Chi who for the second time is beaten shamelessly, the first came from the mantis master. Desperate, Chi runs to find the kid whom he befriended earlier on and his uncle. Time passes and the uncle decides to teach both the kid and Chi the thundering mantis style. After Chi finishes training he goes to wander around with the kid. Meanwhile, to the uncle's surprise, Hsia arrives and duels with him. Initially, the uncle gets the upper hand only to lose stamina and ends up getting wounded. Hsia takes advantage and uses his full strength to finally kill him. The climax has the kid and Chi caught by Hsia and the Jade gang, after the kid is tortured and killed Chi goes insane and suffers from a mental breakdown. Thus, breaking free and killing every single Jade gang member.

In the end, he goes up against Hsia for the second time and while fighting, he mixes his insanity with the mantis style and brutally kills Hsia.

== Cast ==
- Bryan Leung as Ah Chi, a fishmonger
- Cheng Feng as Shu Len
- Eddy Ko Hung as Shiao Tse-tung
- Wong Yat-lung as The Kid
- Chin Yuet-sang as Uncle
- Lee Kwan as Fish shop owner
- Fang Mian as Shu Len's Dad
- Suen Lam as Pharmacy boss
- Ma Chin-ku as White suit underboss
- Shih Ting-ken as White Suit's lead thug

== Home media releases ==
=== VHS ===
- In the United States the film was released on VHS 23 February 1999 by Xenon.
- In the United Kingdom the film was released on VHS 11 March 1996 by Eastern Heroes and later again 18 June 2001 by Mia.

=== DVD ===
- In the United States the film was released on DVD on 26 February 2002 by Xenon, fullscreen. Later 8 July 2003 Xenon re-released a digitally remastered version of the movie, widescreen but with cuts.
- In the United Kingdom the film was released on DVD on 25 July 2005 by Mia.
- In Austria the film was released on PAL DVD by NSM Austriain 2013, 1:85:1 widescreen, uncut.
