= Eddy Ko =

Hong Kong actor

Eddy Ko Hung
- 高雄
- Born: Ho Yiu-sum; December 26, 1944 (age 81); Zhongshan, Guangdong, Republic of China
- Occupation: Actor
- Years active: 1968–present

Chinese name
- Chinese: 高雄
Transcriptions
Standard Mandarin
- Hanyu Pinyin: Gāo Xióng

Ho Yiu-sum
- Chinese: 何耀深
Transcriptions
Standard Mandarin
- Hanyu Pinyin: Hé Yàoshēn

Eddy Ko Hung (Chinese: 高雄; Jyutping: gou1 hung4; born Ho Yiu-sum (何耀深); born 26 December 1944) is a Hong Kong actor and martial artist. He has appeared in over 150 film and television roles since his debut in 1969. He is perhaps best known for his roles as Chan Chung in the 1984 Hong Kong action war film Heroes Shed No Tears, and Hong in the 1998 American buddy cop action film Lethal Weapon 4. Most recently, he has made appearances in several international films including 2015's The Martian.

== Early life ==
Ko was born Ho Yiu-sim in Zhongshan, Guangdong Province on 26 December 1944, and moved to British Hong Kong with his family as a child. He trained in kung fu and judo, and was a lion dancer.

== Career ==
Ko joined Shaw Brothers Studio in the late 1960s as a stuntman, and made his film acting debut in 1969, adopting the name Ko Hung as a stage name. He is also sometimes also credited as Ko Hung, Gao Xiong, Eddie Ko, Edward Ko, and Lin Sheng (林琛).

Throughout the 1970s and '80s, he appeared in numerous martial arts films. Some of his best known films of this time include The Avenging Eagle (1978, dir. Sun Chung), The Butterfly Murders (1979, Tsui Hark's directorial debut), The Postman Strikes Back (1982, dir. Ronny Yu), and The Miracle Fighters (1982, dir. Yuen Woo-ping).

Ko played the leading role in John Woo's 1984 film Heroes Shed No Tears.

Ko joined TVB later and has since acted in many TV drama series. In 1990, Ko joined TVB's rival ATV and worked there until 1995. In 2000, Ko rejoined TVB and continued acting in many TVB-produced drama series.

Within the Chinese community, Ko's most remembered performance was in the 1995 version of the television drama Fist of Fury as Huo Yuanjia, the mentor of Chen Zhen. This role led to similar martial arts mentor roles, subsequently.

In 1998, he migrated his family to Canada, and co-starred in a role of an illegal immigrant in Lethal Weapon 4, in his first international role. Since then, he has appeared in American, Hong Kong, and Mainland Chinese productions.

== Filmography ==
=== Films ===
Year	Title	Role	Notes
1971	The Blade Spares None		
1971	The Invincible Iron Palm		
1971	The Comet Strikes		
1971	Thirty Six Killers		aka Story of the Thirty Six Killers
1972	The Roaring Lion		
1972	The Invasion		aka The Bold Brothers
1972	The Notorious Ones		
1972	Life and Death		aka Bloody Duel: Life and Death, The Bloody Fight
1972	The Peeper, the Model and the Hypnotist		
1973	Thunderbolt		
1973	A Gathering of Heroes		
1973	Knight Errant		
1973	The Smugglers		
1974	Chinese Kung Fu Against Godfather		aka Fist of Fury in China
1974	The Virgin Mart		aka Fan Mai Ren Kou
1975	The Young Rebel		
1975	The Monk		
1975	Female Fugitive		
1976	The Private Eyes	Nine Uncle's underling	
1976	End of the Wicked Tigers		
1976	The Big Family		
1977	Battle Wizard		
1979	The Butterfly Murders	Guo, The Magic Fire	
1979	The Deadly Breaking Sword		
1979	The Avenging Eagle	Wan Da	13-minute interview with Eddy Ko on French version DVD
1979	Sleeping Fist		
1979	Law Don		
1980	The Sword	Ching Ti-yi	
1980	The Chief	The Chief	
1980	The Jade Fox		
1980	The Thundering Mantis		aka Mantis Fist Fighter
1980	The Master	Pupil of Shi (Ko Han)	aka 3 Evil Masters
1980	San Mao Liu Lang Ji	Mr. Chu	
1981	Hitman in the Hand of Buddha	Uncle 33	
1981	The Phantom Killer	Captain Chao	
1981	Art of War by Sun Tzu		
1982	Demi-Gods and Semi-Devils	Kau Mo-chit	
1982	Health Warning	The Master	aka Digital Master, Flash Future Kung Fu
1982	Duel to the Death	Kenji	
1982	The Postman Strikes Back	Hu	aka The Postman Fights Back
1982	The Miracle Fighters	Royal Guardsman Kao	
1983	The Champions	Tong's Uncle	
1983	Little Dragon Maiden	Da'erba	
1983	Mad Mad 83		
1983	Shaolin Drunkard	Master Lee	
1983	Lone Ninja Warrior		aka Faster Blade, Poisonous Darts, The Demon Fighter
1984	Heroes Shed No Tears	Chan Chung	
1985	It's a Drink, It's a Bomb	Bearded Killer	
1985	Hong Yun Dang Tou	Professor	
1987	Flaming Brothers	Brother Hung	
1988	Peacock King	Jigume	
1988	Ruthless Law		
1989	Iron Butterfly, Part 2: See No Daylight	Kurada	
1989	Ghost Fever	Johnny Fan	
1989	Burning Ambition	Kau Chen	
1989	Fatal Bet	Gold Teeth	
1989	Casino Raiders	Gold Teeth	
1989	Live Hard	Ironman	
1989	A Punch to Revenge		
1989	Life Goes On		
1989	Dark Side of Chinatown	Hung	
1990	Vampire Settle on the Police Camp	Chan	
1991	Spiritually a Cop		
1991	Lee Rock	Police Instructor	
1991	Mission Kill	Ngon	aka Angel Force & Mission of Condor
1991	Dreaming the Reality	Fok	
1992	Evil Black Magic	La Pin	
1992	Justice, My Foot!	Yang Ching	
1992	Cheetah on Fire	Fok Chi-Kien	
1992	Mountain Warriors		
1993	The East is Red	Chin	aka Swordsman III
1993	The Bride with White Hair	Wu San-kuei	
1993	Executioners	President's Deputy	
1993	The Bride with White Hair 2	Wu San-kuei	
1994	Master of Zen	Bodhidharma's father	
1995	Rumble in the Bronx	Prospective Market Buyer	
1996	Evening Liaison	Edward Ko	
1996	The Hero of Swallow		
1998	Lethal Weapon 4	Hong	
1998	A Killer's Expiry Date		
1999	The Mission	Lung	
2003	PTU	Eye Ball	
2003	Night Corridor	Father Chan	
2004	Explosive City		
2004	Cop Unbowed	Mr. Dick	
2004	To My Dearest Father	Uncle Gun	
2006	Lethal Ninja	Ba-jiu	
2007	Mad Detective	Retired officer	Cameo
2007	Wonder Woman	Chairman Chan	
2007	The Counting House	Andrew	
2008	Kung Fu Dunk	Fang's Master	
2009	Largo Winch	Tattooer	
2015	The Martian	Guo Ming	
2016	Window Horses	Stephen (voice)	
2022	Warriors of Future		

=== Television ===
Year	Title	Role	Network	Notes
1980	Tai Chi Master	Jai-sum Monk	RTV	
1981	The Big Boss	Chien Bat	TVB	
1982	The Magic Crane		RTV	
1982	Demi-Gods and Semi-Devils	Kung-ye Kon	TVB	
1982	The Legend of the Condor Heroes	Chuen Kam-fat	TVB	
1983	The Return of the Condor Heroes	Fung Mut-fung	TVB	
1984	The Legend Continues	Tam Wing-git	TVB	
1985	Chor Lau-heung	Hu Tiehua	CTV	
1986	New Heavenly Sword and Dragon Sabre	Monk Kok-yuen	TVB	
1986	The Unyielding Master Lim	Master Lim	TVB	
1987	When Silken Hands Get Rough	Goo Jat-yun	TVB	
1987	Foundling's Progress	Nip Dong-shing	TVB	
1987	The Dragon Sword	Yong Siu-tin	TVB	
1987	Police Cadet '88	Bin Shing	TVB	
1988	The Saga of the Lost Kingdom	Dan Fu	TVB	
1988	Military Power		TVB	
1988	Flame of Fury		TVB	
1989	Deadly Secret	Mui Nim-sang	TVB	
1989	The Final Combat	Ngai Ding-san	TVB	
1989	Greed	Yung Tung-shing	TVB	
1990	No Way Out		TVB	
1990	Road to Eternity	Tam Mei's partner	TVB	
1990	The Blood Sword	General Shan Dan	ATV	
1991	Rebuilding Prosperity	Lam	ATV	
1991	Who's the Winner	Fong Jan	ATV	
1991	Shanghai 1949		ATV	
1992	Spirit of the Dragon		ATV	
1992	Who's the Winner II	Hung Ying	ATV	
1992	Who's the Winner III	Cheung Kuen	ATV	
1992	Police Story		ATV	
1992	Spirit of the Dragon	Yim Sing-nam	ATV	
1992	Mythical Crane, Magic Needle '92	Nam Hoi-ping	ATV	
1993	Reincarnated II	Tong Bak-chuen	ATV	
1993	Police Story II		ATV	
1994	Secret Battle Of The Majesty	Miu Lo-sam	ATV	
1994	Heroic Legend of the Yang's Family	Yeung Yin-chiu	ATV	
1995	Fist of Fury	Fok Yuen-gap	ATV	
1995	Outlaw Hero	Cho Hin-lung	ATV	
1996	King of Gamblers	Dr. Koo Ting-foon	ATV	
1996	State of Divinity		TVB	
1997	The Snow is Red	Sheung-koon Tin-pang	ATV	
1998	Legend of Dagger Li	Sheung-koon Kam-hung		Chinese TV series
1999	Ten Tigers of Canton	Wong Kei-ying	ATV	
2000	The Legendary Four Aces	Lin Wong	TVB	
2002	A Herbalist Affair	Cheung Wai-on	TVB	
2002	Network Love Story	Yeung Shing-hay	TVB	
2002	Lofty Waters Verdant Bow	Mang San-tung	TVB	
2002	The Monkey King: Quest for the Sutra	Emperor Tong		
2003	The 'W' Files	Boss Pak	TVB	
2003	Vigilante Force	Luk Kin-mou	TVB	
2003	Riches and Stitches	Sun Pak-chuen	TVB	
2003	Fate Twisters	Choi Wing-chi	TVB	
2004	Split Second	Wong Chun-yeung	TVB	
2004	Heroes of Sui and Tang	Lo Ngai	CTV	
2005	The Gentle Crackdown	Man Chun-fong	TVB	
2005	The Dragon Heroes	Emperor		Chinese TV series
2006	Lethal Weapons of Love and Passion	Chu Yuen-cheung	TVB	
2006	Au Revoir Shanghai	Ku Cheung-shing	TVB	
2006	Hong Kong Special Cases: The Daughter Murderer	Chan Keung	ATV	
2006	The Patriotic Knights	Jiang Haitian		Chinese TV series
2007	Masters of Science Fiction	Chinese leader	ABC	Episode: "The Awakening"
2007	Devil's Disciples	Pak Tong-ngo	TVB	
2008	Son of the Dragon	Lord Shing	Hallmark Movie Channel	TV movie
2008	Legacy Of Time	Lau Kai-ming	Astro	Malaysian TV series
2009	Lion and Heart	Man Tin-cheung	ntv7	Malaysian TV series
2009	In the Chamber of Bliss	Suen Man	TVB	cameo
2012	Xuan-Yuan Sword: Scar of Sky	Chen Fu	Hunan TV	
2013	The Demi-Gods and Semi-Devils	Sweeper Monk		Chinese TV series
