= Ronny Yu =

Hong Kong film director

- 于仁泰
- Born: 1950 (age 75–76); British Hong Kong
- Other name: Ronny Yan-Tai Yu
- Education: Ohio University
- Occupations: Director; producer; screenwriter

Ronny Yu Yan-Tai (Chinese: 于仁泰) is a Hong Kong film director, producer, and screenwriter. He has worked on both Hong Kong and American films. He is mostly known for his work in the American horror genre, such as Bride of Chucky (1998) and Freddy vs. Jason (2003).

== Early life and education ==
Yu was born in Hong Kong and graduated from Ohio University.

== Career ==
Early films include The Servant (1979), The Saviour (1980), and The Occupant (1984).

In 1982, Yu directed The Postman Strikes Back. The film stars Bryan Leung as the titular protagonist who is sent on a mission to deliver a cargo of four mysterious cases to a rebel leader. The film co-stars Chow Yun-fat, Eddy Ko, Cherie Chung, etc.

In 1986, Yu directed the Hong Kong action crime thriller Legacy of Rage. It was Brandon Lee's first lead role. Yu said that he and Lee did not get along during shooting. In the film, Lee plays a young man blamed for a crime he did not commit. Lee was nominated for a Hong Kong Film Award for Best New Performer in this role. In May of the following year, it was a critical success at the Cannes Film Festival and commercial success in Japan. In 1998, Legacy of Rage was released directly to video in the U.S. and Australia the next year. This was due to ongoing interest on Lee's film, due to his early passing in 1993. The film has been described as stylistic and fast-paced, with a good performance by Lee. Some critics considered it to be Lee's best genre film.

In 1994, Yu directed both The Bride with White Hair and its sequel. Also that year, Yu was credited as executive producer on the film Chunggamsuk .

In 1998 Bride of Chucky opened in the USA. Yu directed a cast that consist of Brad Dourif, Jennifer Tilly, John Ritter, Katherine Heigl, and Nick Stabil. The conception began after the release of Child's Play 3 in 1991. Producers Don Mancini and David Kirschner decided that the series required a new direction. Work on the film began in 1996, inspired by the release of Scream and I Know What You Did Last Summer. Yu was hired to direct the film after Kirschner and Mancini were impressed by his film The Bride with White Hair, and accepted in exchange for greater creative freedom and the ability to hire his collaborators Peter Pau and David Wu. It grossed $11.8 million on its opening weekend, for a North American total of $32.4 million and another $18.3 million internationally. It is the highest-grossing film and the US second most financially successful of the Chucky franchise The film has a 49% approval rating on Rotten Tomatoes based on 39 reviews, with an average rating of 5.60 out of 10. The site's critics consensus reads, "Bride of Chucky is devoid of any fright and the franchise has become tiresomely self-parodic, although horror fans may find some pleasure in this fourth entry's camp factor." Audiences polled by CinemaScore gave the film an average grade of "B" on an A+ to F scale.

In 2002, Sony Pictures released The 51st State, directed by Yu, starring Samuel L. Jackson, Robert Carlyle, Emily Mortimer, Ricky Tomlinson, Sean Pertwee, Rhys Ifans, Stephen Walters and Meat Loaf.

In 2003, Freddy vs. Jason, directed by Yu, has its opening in the USA. While the conception of a movie for a crossover film with a fight between Freddy Krueger and Jason Voorhees dates back to 1987, it was later reviewed in the late 90s which led to its production. Made on a budget of $30,000,000, it grossed domestically in the USA $82,622,655 adding up $116,632,628 worldwide.

In 2006, Yu directed Fearless, starring Jet Li. In Hong Kong it grossed an exceptional HK$30,201,600, making it the highest-grossing domestic film of the territory of 2006. In North America, in its opening weekend, it placed 2nd at the box office, grossing US$10,590,244. The film went on to gross US$24,633,730 by the end of its North American run and its total worldwide gross US$68,072,848. The film holds a rating of 73% on Rotten Tomatoes with the consensus being, "Fearless is a brilliantly choreographed, beautifully filmed endcap to Li's quarter-decade of epic martial arts glory."

He was once attached to direct Snakes on a Plane (2006) and he was aboard the project when Samuel L. Jackson, whom he directed in The 51st State, signed on. Before shooting began, however, he was replaced by David R. Ellis.

In 2009, Yu directed the Fear Itself episode, "Family Man" which starred Clifton Collins Jr. Also that year, Yu was a credited screenwriter and producer on Blood: The Last Vampire directed by Chris Nahon. Production began, in May 2006, producer Bill Kong announced that he was producing a live-action film adaptation of the amine Blood: The Last Vampire, to be directed by Yu. Like the source material, it would be primarily filmed in English rather than Japanese. Kong and Yu originally planned to finance the project themselves, but in November 2006, Production I.G officially consented to the film and began offering financial support. Rather than being paid a straight license, Production I.G will receive a percentage of all revenues generated by the film. Through ties to Manga Entertainment, the French company Pathé became the film's co-production company, joining the Hong Kong-based Edko. Yu was retained as its producer, but Nahon took over as the film's director. Originally slated to be released worldwide in spring 2008, the film premiered in Japan on 29 May 2009, and was released in the United Kingdom on 26 June 2009. Sony Pictures Worldwide Acquisitions Group licensed the film for release in North America, where it was released to theatres by Samuel Goldwyn Films on 10 July 2009. The film grossed US$473,992 in Japan, and had a worldwide gross of US$5,731,143. On the opening weekend of its limited release to twenty theatres in the United States, the film grossed $103,000.

In 2010, Yu appeared in the A Nightmare on Elm Street documentary Never Sleep Again: The Elm Street Legacy, and in 2013 in the Friday the 13th documentary Crystal Lake Memories: The Complete History of Friday the 13th.

== Filmography ==
Year	Title	Director	Producer	Writer
1979	The Servant (Qiang nei qiang wai)	Yes	No	No
1980	The Saviour (Jiu shi zhe)	Yes	No	No
1982	The Postman Strikes Back (Xun cheng ma)	Yes	No	No
1981	The Trail (Zhui gui qi xiong)	Yes	No	No
1984	The Occupant (Ling qi po ren)	Yes	No	No
1985	Mummy Dearest (Si yan zi)	Yes	No	No
1986	Legacy of Rage (Long zai jiang hu)	Yes	No	No
1988	Bless This House (Meng gui fo tiao qiang)	Yes	No	No
1989	China White (Hong tian long hu hui)	Yes	Yes	No
1991	Great Pretenders (Qian wang)	Yes	No	No
1992	Shogun and Little Kitchen (Huo tou fu xing)	Yes	No	No
1992	Steel Horse (Wu Lin sheng dou shi)	Yes	No	No
1993	The Bride with White Hair (Bai fa mo nu zhuan)	Yes	Yes	Yes
1993	The Bride with White Hair 2 (Bai fa mo nu zhuan II)	No	Yes	Yes
1995	The Phantom Lover (Ye ban ge sheng)	Yes	No	Yes
1997	Warriors of Virtue	Yes	Yes	No
1998	Bride of Chucky	Yes	No	No
2002	The 51st State	Yes	No	No
2003	Freddy vs. Jason	Yes	No	No
2006	Fearless (Huo Yuanjia)	Yes	Yes	No
2013	Saving General Yang (Zhong lie Yang Jia Jiang)	Yes	No	No

Producer only

- The Extras (Jia li fei) (1978)
- Eight in the Family (1985)
- It's a Mad, Mad, Mad World (Fu gui bi ren) (1987)
- Lover (1987)
- The Girl Next Door (1988)
- Chicken and Duck Talk (Ji tong ya jiang) (1988)
- It's a Mad, Mad, Mad World 2 (Fu gui zai po ren) (1988)
- Summer Lovers (Xia ri qing ren) (1992)
- Once Upon a Time a Hero in China (Huang Fei Hong xiao zhuan) (1992)
- Cohabitation (Tong ju guan xi) (1993)
- The Incorruptible (Li Luo-Fu qi an) (1993)
- All's Well, Ends Well Too (Hua tian xi shi) (1993)
- Once Upon a Time a Hero in China II (Huang Fei Hong dui Huang Fei Hong) (1993)
- Satin Steel (Chung Gam Suk) (1994)

== Works cited ==
- Bracke, Peter (2006), Crystal Lake Memories: The Complete History of Friday The 13th, Titan Books, ISBN 9781845763435
