= Tai Chi Boxer =

1996 Hong Kong film by Yuen Woo-ping and Zhang Xinyan

- UK DVD cover
- Traditional Chinese: 太極拳
- Simplified Chinese: 太极拳
- Hanyu Pinyin: Tàijí Quán
- Jyutping: Tai3 Gik6 Kyun4
- Directed by: Yuen Woo-ping; Chang Hsin-yen
- Written by: Yuen Woo-ping; Sze Yeung-ping
- Produced by: Stephen Wong
- Starring: Jacky Wu; Christy Chung; Sibelle Hu; Billy Chow; Mark Cheng; Lau Shun
- Cinematography: Chau Pak-ling
- Edited by: Chang Hsin-yen; Koo Chi-wai
- Music by: Bin Lau-lim; Tang Siu-lam
- Production company: Film Can Production
- Distributed by: Upland Films Corporate
- Release date: 14 March 1996
- Running time: 96 minutes
- Country: Hong Kong
- Language: Cantonese
- Box office: HK$742,095

Tai Chi Boxer (Chinese: 太極拳), also known as Tai Chi II or Tai Chi Fist, is a 1996 Hong Kong martial arts film directed by Yuen Woo-ping and Zhang Xinyan, co-written by Yuen and Sze Yeung-ping, and edited by Zhang and Koo Chi-wai. It is a sequel to Yuen's earlier film Tai Chi Master, with Lau Shun and Yu Hai returning, albeit in different roles. The film stars Jacky Wu, Christy Chung, Sibelle Hu, Billy Chow, Mark Cheng and Lau Shun. The film was released theatrically in Hong Kong on 14 March 1996. Tai Chi Boxer was Jacky Wu's first Hong Kong film debut. The film is set in the late Qing Dynasty Era.

== Cast ==
- Jacky Wu as Hawkman / Jackie
- Christy Chung as Rose
- Sibelle Hu as Jackie's Mother
- Billy Chow as Wong, Great Kick of the North
- Mark Cheng as Lam Wing
- Lau Shun as Officer Tsao (Rose's Father)
- Yu Hai as Yeung Shan-wu (Jackie's Father)
- Darren Shahlavi as Smith
- Ji Chun-hua as Da Bu-liang (Smith henchman)
- Tam Chiu as Ya Sung
- Kam Tak-mau as Lin Tung
- Kau Chim-man as Siou Bu-liang (Smith henchman)
- Xu Xiang-dong as Bao Biou (Smith henchman)

== Reception ==
Reviewer Paul Bramhall of cityonfire.com gave the film a rating of 7.5/10, writing, "At its heart though, this is a pure kung fu movie, and it remains the most impressive showcase for Wu Jing's talents, providing plenty of opportunities for him to strut his stuff. Sure some if it may be derivative, but when every fight scene is firing on all cylinders like they are here, such things can be easily forgiven."

Reviewer Andrew Saroch of fareastfilms.com gave the film a rating of 3.5 out of 5 stars, writing, "'Tai Chi II' features an average plot and some unnecessary over-the-top moments, but is a decent effort that usually earns little attention from Hong Kong film fans. It lacks the polish of Yuen Woo Ping’s numerous other classics, however it acquires a charm of its own. A very strong three and a half star rating, verging very close to a four."

Reviewer Glen Stanway of kungkingdom.com gave the film a rating of 7/10, writing, "If you are a fan of the genre and Yuen Woo Ping’s choreography in general, this makes a half-decent ninety-minute diversion!"

Reviewer Phillip O'Connor of farestkicks.com gave the film a rating of 3.5 out of 5 stars, writing, "Yuen Woo-Ping’s unofficial sequel to his own film proves good films work despite their weaknesses."

Reviewer LP Hugo of asianfilmstrike.com gave the film a rating of 2.5 stars, writing, "Long on tedious comedy, short on martial arts memorability, Tai Chi II failed as a showcase of Jacky Wu Jing’s talents, though it is indeed passably entertaining."

Reviewer Guido Henkel of dvdreview.com gave the film a rating of 4 out of 5 stars, writing, "It is a lighthearted romantic comedy with plenty of great action sequences. It is a pleasure to watch Tai Chi executed so well, although it is spiced up with elements of other Kung Fu schools. If you have ever wondered what those people do in your local park, standing on one leg, slowly rocking from one side to the other, while making slow gestures, you should give 'Tai Chi' a closer look, if only to understand what the art is about and what it looks like when executed to perfection. This film is a far cry from the cheesy Hong Kong films you see on TV every once in a while. It is a well produced kung fu action film with charming images and an intriguing story. Check it out!"

The review on nerd-base.com reads, "I'm surprised this film doesn't have more recognition in the U.S. Heck, it only got 3.5 stars on Netflix. Yes, the story isn't anything special. The bad-guy is kind of lame. However, it is one kick ass fight movie and that's good enough for me. Add a full star onto this one."

Reviewer Keith Hennessey Brown of eyeforfilm.co.uk gave the film 3 out of 5 stars, writing, "By no means essential viewing, Tai Chi Boxer has enough to offer martial arts fans. More casual viewers may prefer to start their exploration of Tai Chi Boxer territory with a more obvious landmark, such as Once Upon A Time In China."

== DVD release ==
DVD was released by Hong Kong Legends in the United Kingdom in Region 2 on 17 June 2002.
