= Septet: The Story of Hong Kong =

- Theatrical release poster
- Chinese: 七人樂隊
- Directed by: Sammo Hung; Ann Hui; Patrick Tam; Yuen Woo-ping; Ringo Lam; Johnnie To; Tsui Hark
- Screenplay by: Sammo Hung; Au Kin-yee; Patrick Tam; Yuen Woo-ping; Ringo Lam; Johnnie To; Tsui Hark; Yau Nai-hoi; Roy Szeto; Lou Shiu-wa; Melvin Luk
- Story by: Au Kin-yee; Yau Nai-hoi
- Produced by: Johnnie To; Elaine Chu
- Starring: Timmy Hung; Francis Ng; Sire Ma; Jennifer Yu; Ian Gouw; Yuen Wah; Ashley Lin; Simon Yam; Mimi Kung; Cheung Tat-ming; Emotion Cheung; Ng Wing-sze; Tony Wu; Eric Tsui; Royce Lam; Chung King-fai; Lam Suet; Lawrence Lau
- Cinematography: Chan Kin-lei; Tam Wan-kai; Poon Hang-sang
- Edited by: Jimmy Hung; Patrick Tam; Tsui Hark; David Richardson; Mary Stephen; Allen Leung; Jeff Cheung
- Music by: Woody Pak; Li Ye; Thomas Lloyd Freeman; Charlotte Chan; Patrick Tam; Thomas Cheng; Peter Kam
- Production companies: China Film Media Asia Distribution; Milkyway Image
- Distributed by: Media Asia Films
- Release dates: 21 October 2020 (Busan International Film Festival); 28 July 2022 (Hong Kong)
- Running time: 113 minutes
- Country: Hong Kong
- Language: Cantonese
- Box office: $1.7 million

Septet: The Story of Hong Kong (Chinese: 七人樂隊) is a 2020 Hong Kong anthology historical drama film directed by seven filmmakers of the Hong Kong New Wave: Sammo Hung, Ann Hui, Patrick Tam, Yuen Woo-ping, Ringo Lam, Johnnie To and Tsui Hark. It is divided into seven stories, each corresponding to a decade in Hong Kong's history, told from the view of ordinary people. It was originally intended for there to be a segment about the 1970s directed by John Woo, but he withdrew for health reasons and the segment was never produced.

The film features an ensemble cast that includes Timmy Hung, Francis Ng, Sire Ma, Jennifer Yu, Ian Gouw, Yuen Wah, Ashley Lin, Simon Yam, Mimi Kung, Cheung Tat-ming, Emotion Cheung, Ng Wing-sze, Tony Wu, Eric Tsui, Royce Lam, Chung King-fai, Lam Suet and Lawrence Lau. Production began in early January 2014 and concluded in August 2014.

The film was screened at the Busan International Film Festival in October 2020, and includes the posthumous work of Ringo Lam, who died in 2018. The film was originally set to be released in 2021 but was delayed due to the COVID-19 pandemic. It was then released in Hong Kong on 28 July 2022 and China on 29 July 2022. The film received mostly positive reviews.

== Cast and crew ==
Decade	Story	Director	Screenwriter	Starring
1950s	Exercise	Sammo Hung	Sammo Hung, Au Kin-yee	Timmy Hung
1960s	Headmaster	Ann Hui	Lou Shiu-wa	Francis Ng, Sire Ma
1980s	Tender Is the Night	Patrick Tam	Melvin Luk, Patrick Tam	Jennifer Yu, Ian Gouw
1990s	Homecoming	Yuen Woo-ping	Yuen Woo-ping, Au Kin-yee	Yuen Wah, Ashley Lin
2000s	Bonanza	Johnnie To	Au Kin-yee, Yau Nai-hoi, Johnnie To	Ng Wing-sze, Tony Wu, Eric Tsui
2010s	Astray	Ringo Lam		Simon Yam, Mimi Kung, Royce Lam, Chung King-fai
2020s	Conversation in Depth	Tsui Hark	Tsui Hark, Roy Szeto	Cheung Tat-ming, Emotion Cheung, Lam Suet, Lawrence Lau

== Awards and nominations ==
Ceremony	Category	Recipient	Results
41st Hong Kong Film Awards	Best Action Choreography	Sammo Hung, Jimmy Hung, Yuen Wo Ping	Nominated
