= Once Upon a Time in Shanghai (2014 film) =

2014 Hong Kong-Chinese film by Wong Ching-po

- China film poster
- Traditional Chinese: 惡戰
- Simplified Chinese: 恶战
- Hanyu Pinyin: È Zhàn
- Jyutping: Ngok3 Zin3
- Directed by: Wong Ching-po
- Written by: Angela Wong
- Produced by: Wong Jing; Andrew Lau; Connie Wong
- Starring: Sammo Hung; Philip Ng; Andy On; Michelle Hu; Chen Kuan-tai; Mao Junjie
- Cinematography: Jimmy Wong
- Edited by: Wenders Li
- Production companies: Mega-Vision Pictures; See Movie Limited; Henan Film and Television Production; Henan Film Studio; Meiya Great Wall Media (Beijing)
- Distributed by: Mei Ah Entertainment
- Release date: 10 January 2014
- Running time: 95 minutes
- Countries: Hong Kong; China
- Language: Mandarin

Once Upon a Time in Shanghai (Chinese: 惡戰) is a 2014 martial arts film directed by Wong Ching-po and starring Sammo Hung, Philip Ng and Andy On with action choreography by Yuen Woo-ping and Yuen Cheung-yan. A Hong Kong-Chinese co-production, the film is a remake of the 1972 film Boxer from Shantung which starred Chen Kuan-tai, who also appears in a supporting role in this film.

== Plot ==
Ma Yongzhen (played by Wu Yunlong), who has been a kung fu stunt since childhood, came from the countryside to the ten-mile ocean field in Shanghai to make a living. Here, he gets acquainted with the newly rising Shanghai Tang overlord Long Qi (played by An Zhijie), two young people with dreams hit it off at first sight, and they have become brothers in life and death through hardships.

Since then, the brothers have worked together, defeated countless enemies, and trampled the biggest gang at the time, the Axe Gang, under their feet in one fell swoop, and shocked the beach with an iron fist. At the same time, Ma Yongzhen also received the help of the retired kung fu master Tie Zhangmen (Sammo Hung), and was able to fight against a strong enemy together.

The Axe Gang and the forces behind it are not willing to fail, and have always been obsessed with Ma Yongzhen and Long Qi, trying to eradicate them. Long Qi was attacked and surrounded by killers, and his life was in danger, Ma Yongzhen saw his brother fall but could not do anything, so he resolutely embarked on the road of revenge.

== Cast ==
- Philip Ng as Ma Yongzhen
- Andy On as Long Qi
- Sammo Hung as Master Tie
- Michelle Hu as Tie Ju
- Chen Kuan-tai as Baldy Bai
- Mao Junjie as Sheng Xiangjun
- Jiang Luxia as Tie Mei
- Yuen Cheung-yan as Laughing Buddha
- Fung Hak-on as Scruffy Chou
- Jet-Jitta Swaleh as Jet Atharweathers
