= Iron Monkey (1993 film) =

1993 Hong Kong film by Yuen Woo-ping

- Theatrical release poster

Chinese name
- Traditional Chinese: 少年黃飛鴻之鐵馬騮
- Simplified Chinese: 少年黄飞鸿之铁马骝
Transcriptions
Standard Mandarin
- Hanyu Pinyin: Shàonián Huáng Fēihóng Zhī Tiě Mǎliú
Yue: Cantonese
- Jyutping: Siu3-nin4 Wong4 Fei1-hung4 Zi1 Tit3 Maa5-lau4
- Directed by: Yuen Woo-ping
- Written by: Tsui Hark; Cheung Tan; Elsa Tang; Lau Tai-Mok
- Produced by: Tsui Hark; Quentin Tarantino (US release)
- Starring: Donnie Yen; Yu Rongguang; Jean Wang; Angie Tsang; Yuen Shun-yi
- Cinematography: Arthur Wong; Tam Chi-wai
- Edited by: Marco Mak; Angie Lam; Andy Chan
- Music by: Richard Yuen (Hong Kong); James L. Venable (United States); Johnny Yeung; William Hu; Chow Gam-wing
- Production companies: Golden Harvest; Long Shong Pictures; Paragon Films; Film Workshop
- Distributed by: Golden Harvest
- Release date: 3 September 1993
- Running time: 90 minutes
- Country: Hong Kong
- Language: Cantonese
- Budget: US$11 million
- Box office: US$14.6 million

Iron Monkey is a 1993 Hong Kong martial arts film written and produced by Tsui Hark and directed by Yuen Woo-ping, starring Donnie Yen, Yu Rongguang, Jean Wang, Angie Tsang and Yuen Shun-yi. It is not related to the 1977 Hong Kong film of the same title.

The film is a fictionalised account of an episode in the childhood of the Chinese folk hero Wong Fei-hung and his father Wong Kei-ying, and their encounter with the "Iron Monkey". In 1996, a separate film titled Iron Monkey 2 was released, but it is unrelated to the 1993 film.

== Plot ==
The plot centers on a masked martial artist known as Iron Monkey. Iron Monkey is actually the alter ego of a traditional Chinese medicine physician called Yang Tianchun. During the day, Yang runs his clinic and provides free medical treatment for the poor, which he subsidises by charging his rich patients. At night, he dresses in black and travels around town to rob the rich and help the poor. Once, he breaks into the governor's residence and makes off with a hoard of gold. The guards and four Shaolin monks are unable to stop him. The governor orders the chief constable, Fox, to hunt down Iron Monkey and to arrest anyone who is linked to him in any way. Fox appears to be a bungler who is not aware that Iron Monkey is actually the physician treating his injured men who fought with Iron Monkey the previous night.

In the meantime, Wong Kei-ying, also a physician and martial artist from Foshan, arrives in town with his young son, Wong Fei-hung. Wong Kei-ying fights with street thugs who attempt to rob him. Some soldiers who have been observing the fight nearby suspect that Wong is Iron Monkey, and they arrest him and his son. During the trial, the governor orders Wong Fei-hung to be branded for defiance, but Iron Monkey shows up and disrupts the proceedings. Wong Kei-ying is eager to prove his innocence, and he fights with Iron Monkey. Neither of them is able to defeat his opponent, and Iron Monkey escapes. The governor is impressed by Wong Kei-ying's skill, and he holds Wong Fei-hung hostage to force Wong Kei-ying to help him capture Iron Monkey within seven days.

The locals despise Wong Kei-ying for assisting the governor in capturing their hero, so they refuse to sell him food or provide him with shelter. Wong eventually arrives at Yang's clinic and is taken in by Yang and Miss Orchid, while he is still unaware of Yang's true identity. With help from Fox, Yang manages to bring Wong Fei-hung, who has fallen sick, out of prison and keeps him in his clinic. Wong Fei-hung learns new martial arts from Yang and Miss Orchid during his stay with them.

Meanwhile, a Shaolin traitor named Hin-hung, who has become an imperial official, arrives in town with his followers. Hin-hung takes over as the new governor. Iron Monkey and Wong Kei-ying run into Hin-hung and his men in two separate encounters, and they are severely wounded by him. They retreat back to the clinic, where Wong is surprised to discover that Yang is actually Iron Monkey. They assist each other and recover from their wounds quickly. Concurrently, Hin-hung orders his men to search the town for Iron Monkey and Wong Kei-ying, but Fox gets to the clinic first to warn Orchid. It turns out that Fox has known Iron Monkey's true identity all along, and he has been secretly helping Iron Monkey.

Hin-hung's monks eventually find their way to the clinic, and they engage Orchid in a fight. When Orchid proves far too skillful for the monks, they drug her and attempt to rape her. She is saved by Wong Fei-hung, who continues the battle with the monks using the staff movements he learned from Yang and Orchid. Although Wong Fei-hung is able to defeat the Hin-hung's best monks, he is captured and tortured. Orchid escapes to warn Wong Kei-ying and Iron Monkey.

Iron Monkey and Wong Kei-ying (also wearing the Iron Monkey costume) break into the governor's residence to rescue Wong Fei-hung and defeat Hin-hung's men and monks. They have a final confrontation with Hin-hung on top of burning wooden poles. After an intense fight, Iron Monkey and Wong Kei-ying defeat Hin-hung and knock him down into the inferno below. At the end of the film, the protagonists learn that a new governor has taken office, and they hope that he will be a good official. The Wongs leave town for Foshan while Yang and Orchid see them off. Fox says that he would like to visit the Wongs, but that he is too busy "trying to catch that Iron Monkey". After the film, screen captions inform viewers that Yang and Orchid are married, and that Wong Fei-hung, inspired by his father and the Iron Monkey, later becomes a hero among the Chinese and restores honor to the Shaolin Monastery.

== Cast ==
- Donnie Yen as Wong Kei-ying
- Yu Rongguang as Yang Tianchun / Iron Monkey
- Jean Wang as Miss Orchid
- Angie Tsang as Wong Fei-hung
- Yen Shi-kwan as Hin-hung
- James Wong as Governor Cheng
- Yuen Shun-yi as Fox
- Lee Fai as White Eagle (Hin-hung's student)
- Hsiao Ho as Disfigured Swordsman (Hin-hung's student)
- Chun Kwai-bo as Shaolin monk
- Chan Siu-wah as Shaolin monk
- Chan Chi-man as Shaolin monk
- Yip Choi-nam as Shaolin monk
- Cheung Fung-lei as Governor Cheng's mistress
- Shut Mei-yee as Governor Cheng's advisor
- Duen Wai-lun as Rich patient
- Dang Tai-who as Chief of thieves' gang
- Wong Kim-ban as Member of thieves' gang
- Ling Chi-hung as Constable
- Lam Chi-tai (extra)
- Dion Lam (extra)

== Reception ==
The film's domestic release was delayed due to producer Tsui Hark's insistence on filming some additional comedic scenes after Yuen Woo-ping had finished the film. According to an interview with Tsui on the Iron Monkey DVD release, this delay may have had a negative effect on the film's box office earnings.

The film was given a wide release in the United States by Miramax Films, backed by director Quentin Tarantino. It opened in October 2001 on 1,225 screens, earning just over $6 million in its opening weekend and more than $14 million overall. It received good reviews in America and became the 11th-highest-grossing foreign language film in the United States. The film received favorable reviews from critics and holds a 90% rating on the film review website Rotten Tomatoes. The film was ranked #99 in Empire magazine's "The 100 Best Films Of World Cinema" in 2010.

== Changes in the United States release ==
In its release in 2001, numerous controversial edits and changes were made to the film for the United States release, to the dismay of Hong Kong cinema fans. Miramax made several changes that the company felt would make the film more marketable to American audiences:

- As most Americans are unfamiliar with the story of Wong Fei-hung, his name was removed from the original Chinese title.
- The subtitles were tailored to diminish the political context of the story.
- Some scenes were trimmed to tone down the violence.
- Originally, some fight scenes had been sped up in places through undercranking. The United States release slowed these scenes down to a more normal pace.
- Several comedic scenes, particularly ones interspersed in the fight scenes, were removed to give the fights a more serious feel. Although such comedic devices are common in Hong Kong cinema, the editors felt that they might appear odd to American audiences.
- A new soundtrack was composed that emulated the classical score to Crouching Tiger, Hidden Dragon, and in doing so, the Wong Fei-hung theme song was eliminated.
- New sound effects were dubbed for the fighting to make them more realistic (as opposed to the more traditional exaggerated Hong Kong sounds).

== Home media ==
In Hong Kong, the film was initially released by Megastar (later Deltamac) in a basic version. This version was released in the United States by Tai Seng. Later, it was re-released in Hong Kong by IVL in a digitally remastered edition in the Donnie Yen & Yuen Woo Ping Action Collection.

On 26 March 2001, the DVD was released by Hong Kong Legends in the United Kingdom in region 2. On 1 March 2004, the DVD for the film was released in a two-disc platinum edition. One year later, the Epic Action Collection DVD was released on 26 December 2005 in a four-disc set, which includes two other martial arts films - Wing Chun and Tai Chi Boxer - also directed by Yuen Woo-ping. Five months later, The Donnie Yen Collection DVD was released on 29 May 2006 in a four-disc set, which includes another two martial arts films - New Dragon Gate Inn and Once Upon a Time in China II. Miramax (with assistance from Lionsgate on some versions) released their version on DVD in the United States and also on Blu-ray on 15 September 2009, with the English audio in DTS-HD Master Audio 5.1 and the Chinese audio in Dolby Digital 5.1.

== See also ==
- Donnie Yen filmography
