= Shaolin Drunkard =

1983 Hong Kong film by Yuen Woo-ping

- Promotional release poster
- Directed by: Yuen Woo-ping
- Written by: Yuen Woo-ping; Chung Hing Chiu
- Starring: Yuen Cheung-yan; Yuen Yat-cho; Eddy Ko; Yuen Shun-yi
- Cinematography: Ma Koon-wah
- Edited by: Kwok Ting-hung
- Music by: Tang Siu-lam
- Production company: Peace Film Production (HK) Co.
- Distributed by: First Films
- Release dates: 9 July 1983 (Taiwan); 24 August 1983 (Hong Kong)
- Running time: 100 minutes
- Country: Hong Kong
- Language: Cantonese

Shaolin Drunkard (Chinese: 天師撞邪; pinyin: Tian shi zhuang xie), a.k.a. Wu Tang Master or Miracle Fighters 2, is a 1983 kung fu comedy film directed by Yuen Woo-ping, written by Yuen Woo-ping and Chung Hing Chiu, and starring Yuen Cheung-yan, Yuen Yat-cho Eddy Ko, and Yuen Shun-yi.

== Plot ==
At a Shaolin temple, an evil magician demon is being held prisoner. A drunken shaolin sorcerer, Chan, shirks his duty to go drinking, leading to the demon escaping. At the same time, Ah Yuen, another sorcerer, is being hassled by his grandmother Yau to find a wife. He sets out to find his potential bride, and battles another magician who's using his powers to con local townsfolk. After winning, he finds out there's a competition to wed the bride of a local magistrate. He wins the competition, but it turns out the magistrate is actually being threatened by the evil magician to find lunar-born virgins so he can drink their blood and gain their powers. After avoiding a death-trap to steal his blood and fleeing, he eventually crosses paths with Chan, who recruits him to help re-capture the evil magician.
