= Taoism Drunkard =

1984 Hong Kong film by Yuen Cheung-yan

- Theatrical release poster

Chinese name
- Traditional Chinese: 鬼馬天師
- Simplified Chinese: 鬼马天师
Transcriptions
Standard Mandarin
- Hanyu Pinyin: Guǐ mǎ tiān shī
- Directed by: Yuen Cheung-yan
- Written by: Mai Kei; Clan Yuen
- Produced by: Lo Wei
- Starring: Yuen Cheung-yan; Yuen Yat-chor
- Cinematography: Ma Koon-Wah
- Edited by: Kuo Ting-Hung
- Music by: Tang Siu-Lam
- Production company: Lo Wei Motion Picture Company
- Distributed by: Ocean Shores Video
- Release date: 29 November 1984
- Running time: 95 minutes
- Country: Hong Kong
- Language: Cantonese

Taoism Drunkard (鬼馬天師; Guǐ mǎ tiān shī), also known as Drunken Wu-Tang, is a 1984 Hong Kong martial arts comedy film directed by Yuen Cheung-yan, who also stars in the film alongside his brother Yuen Yat-chor; the two are part of the sibling filmmaking team known as the Yuen Brothers or the Yuen Clan, who produced the similarly themed Shaolin Drunkard (1983).

== Reception ==
In their 1995 book The Encyclopedia of Martial Arts Movies, authors Bill Palmer, Karen Palmer and Ric Meyers gave Taoism Drunkard a score of two-and-a-half out of four stars, calling it "one of the strangest kung fu comedies we've ever seen".

== Home media ==
Taoism Drunkard was released on LaserDisc by Ocean Shores Video, and Video CD (VCD) by Mega Star Video Distribution. In the United States, the film was released on VHS by Arena Home Video under the title Drunken Wu-Tang.
