= Tai Chi Master (film) =

1993 Hong Kong film by Yuen Woo-ping

- Theatrical poster

Chinese name
- Traditional Chinese: 太極張三豐
- Simplified Chinese: 太极张三丰
Transcriptions
Standard Mandarin
- Hanyu Pinyin: Tàijí Zhāng Sānfēng
Yue: Cantonese
- Jyutping: Taai3 Gik6 Zeong1 Saam1 Fung1
- Directed by: Yuen Woo-ping
- Written by: Kim Yip
- Produced by: Jet Li
- Starring: Jet Li; Michelle Yeoh; Chin Siu-ho; Fennie Yuen; Yuen Cheung-yan; Lau Shun
- Cinematography: Tom Lau
- Edited by: Angie Lam
- Music by: William Wu
- Production company: Eastern Production
- Distributed by: Golden Harvest; Gala Film Distribution
- Release date: 18 November 1993
- Running time: 96 minutes
- Country: Hong Kong
- Language: Cantonese
- Box office: HK$12.6 million

Tai Chi Master (Chinese: 太極張三豐), also known as Twin Warriors or simply Tai Chi, is a 1993 Hong Kong martial arts film directed by Yuen Woo-ping. It was produced by Jet Li, who also starred in the film as the eponymous protagonist, Zhang Junbao, a young man who goes on to pioneer the martial art of tai chi. The film also features Chin Siu-ho and Michelle Yeoh in supporting roles.

Set during the late Song dynasty, the film is a fictionalised origin story for the legendary martial artist Zhang Sanfeng, tracking his journey from a Shaolin monk to a Tai Chi master influenced by Taoism and the "Book of Chi". This transformation is driven by the betrayal of his childhood friend, Tienbo (Siu-ho), as they choose opposite paths during a local rebellion against a tyrannical government.

Released in Hong Kong on 18 November 1993, the film has been widely praised for its fight choreography. It remains celebrated as a defining classic of 1990s Hong Kong action cinema. Paste Magazine ranks it as the 17th best martial arts movie of all time.

== Plot ==
Junbao and Tienbo grow up together in a Shaolin Temple as monks, studying the Shaolin kung fu and generally getting into trouble. They are both expelled from the temple after Tienbo impulsively almost kills a fellow student who cheats in a fight against him. Aided in their escape by their sympathetic teacher, they receive final instructions regarding the potential paths of their different personalities, with a specific warning given to Tienbo.

Junbao and Tienbo then go into the outside world to find their way in life. Meanwhile, a gang of henchmen are forcibly taking money from a local shop owner. A girl nicknamed Miss Li steals the money and returns it. Having noticed the money gone, the henchmen start to chase down Miss Li, who holds her own during the fight but soon gets outnumbered and into trouble. Junbao comes to her aid and defeats the gang, before Army reinforcements arrive to break up the fight and so the trio flee to escape capture. At this moment the eunuch governor Liu Jin travels through the town, roughing up the locals as he does so. Tienbo realizes that he wants to be as rich and powerful as the governor, but Miss Li warns him that the governor has "the heart of a viper".

Miss Li then shows the two sworn brothers to a pub for food. Inside the pub, they find a young woman named Siu-lin, who is searching for her lost husband, during which she supports herself by playing on a sanxian that said husband gave to her as a wedding gift. She finds him inside the pub as the new husband of the governor's sister, who picks a fight with Siu-lin. Siu-lin gets the upper hand in the duel, but the husband, eager to please his wealthy new wife, hits and injures Siu-lin on the head with a stool. Junbao comes to Siu-lin's rescue by fighting off the governor's sister's bodyguards before fleeing.

The next day, while Junbao and Tienbo are making money with their amazing kung fu skills, the governor's second-in-command spots them and is impressed with Tienbo's abilities (and his eagerness to kow-tow to authority). He offers him a position in the army, which Tienbo readily accepts. However, Junbao is more reluctant to do so and declines going with Tienbo, and so the two brothers part ways.

Later, some soldiers come to the pub to collect taxes (which have increased due to the governor's greedy nature), but Junbao and the rebels (who have stolen great valuables from the governor to give back to the poor) fight and kill them one by one. One soldier escapes alive and starts off towards the army's camp to warn them about the rebels with Junbao in pursuit. Just in front of the army encampment, Tienbo kills the soldier before he warns the rest of the army about the rebels whereabouts. Tienbo warns Junbao to stay clear of the rebels as they'll get him into trouble. Now knowing where the rebels are hiding however, Tienbo takes this unique opportunity to gain a promotion. He sets a trap for Junbao and the rebels by telling them that the army is on patrol and when would be the best time to attack them.

Junbao and Siu-lin collect all the rebels from the region and go to the army camp (thus, falling for Tienbo's trap). A big battle occurs where most of the rebels die. Tienbo captures Miss Li and Siu-lin. In the end, the only escaped survivors are Junbao and a few rebels. Because of the trap, the governor promotes Tienbo to Embroidered Uniform Guard lieutenant. Tienbo kills Miss Li to prove his devotion to the governor, and with his new authority (and some poignant advice from the governor) holds Siu-lin as bait so that he can lure Junbao to defect. Junbao shows up to confront Tienbo and rejects his offer, and after a fierce fight manages to rescue Siu-lin. However, due to the injury he receives and the fact that his best friend betrayed him, Junbao's mind snaps and he goes crazy. While recuperating in the countryside safehouse with the help of Siu-lin, he has a sudden epiphany that regains his mental health, and begins using natural phenomenon as inspiration to create a new style of martial arts which uses "soft" movements to offset power, speed and strength.

While the governor is traveling to Beijing to see the emperor, Junbao and Siu-lin intercept the convoy, defeat his sister and guards and captures the governor as a hostage, before going to the army camp to confront Tienbo. Due to his arrogance, Tienbo declines and starts to fight Junbao, thinking the latter is still the inferior fighter. To Tienbo's surprise, however, Junbao is now fighting using the heretofore unseen style, which he calls tai chi, and is able to fend off Tienbo's superior strength with ease. Out of frustration, Tienbo kills the governor in order to gain complete control over the troops surrounding them. Siu-lin intervenes and convinces them not to listen to Tienbo, as he just betrayed their leader. Seeing this (and also the brutal way Tienbo utilizes his troops as battle fodder), the troops back off and leave Tienbo's fate to Junbao. After a stunning series of parries and blows by Junbao, Tienbo is defeated and eventually killed when he falls upon a bundle of spears.

After the fight, Junbao parts way with Siu-lin, and returns Tienbo's ashes to the Shaolin Temple, before establishing his own school at Wudang Mountains.

== Cast ==
- Jet Li as Junbao / Zhang Junbao / Jun Bo / Kwan Bo who later becomes the legendary Zhang Sanfeng whose courtesy name is Junbao
- Chin Siu Ho as Tienbo / Dung Tienbo / Chin Bo
- Michelle Yeoh as Siu Lin / Qiu Xue ("Autumn Snow")
- Fennie Yuen as Miss Li / Xiao Dong Gua ("Little Winter Melon")
- Yuen Cheung-yan as Reverend Ling
- Lau Shun as Master Jueyuan
- Yu Hai as Head Master
- Chow Kam-kong as Rebel
- Sun Jian-kui as Royal Eunuch Liu Jin
- Liu Hongmei as Liu Jin's sister
- Ho Wing-cheung as Rascal
- Yu Yan-kai

== Home media ==
- Universe Laser released DVD in a near uncut state with a Cantonese soundtrack and English subtitles.
- The initial Western release was entitled Twin Warriors. It was released by Dimension Films on DVD in the US on 20 June 2000 and by Hollywood Pictures Home Video in the UK on 8 April 2002. A new English dub was commissioned with a new musical score and some cuts were applied.
- On 29 July 2008, Dragon Dynasty released their DVD containing a Cantonese soundtrack and the Dimension English dub (using the 1993 dub to fill in the previously cut sections). However, the Cantonese "mono" is a downmix of the 5.1 remix.
- An Indian VCD by Diskovery contains the 1993 export English version, but under the title Twice Deadly. It is cut, however.
- On 26 April 2010, Cine Asia was released on DVD in the United Kingdom, the film title has been changed to Tai-Chi Master from Twin Warriors.

== Reception ==
At the Hong Kong box office, the film grossed HK$12,564,442 (US$1.63 million).

In the United Kingdom, the film (released as Twin Warriors) was watched by 1.2 million viewers on television in 2004, making it the year's sixth most-watched foreign-language film on television (below five other Hong Kong action films). It was later watched by 600,000 UK viewers in 2007, making it the year's most-watched foreign-language film on BBC1. Combined, the film drew a 1.8 million UK viewership in 2004 and 2007.

== Sequel ==
A sequel, Tai Chi Boxer, was released in 1996 with Lau Shun and Yu Hai returning, albeit in different roles.

== See also ==
- Jet Li filmography
- Jacky Wu filmography
- List of Hong Kong films
- List of Hong Kong Legends releases
