= Tsui Siu-Ming =

Tsui Siu-ming
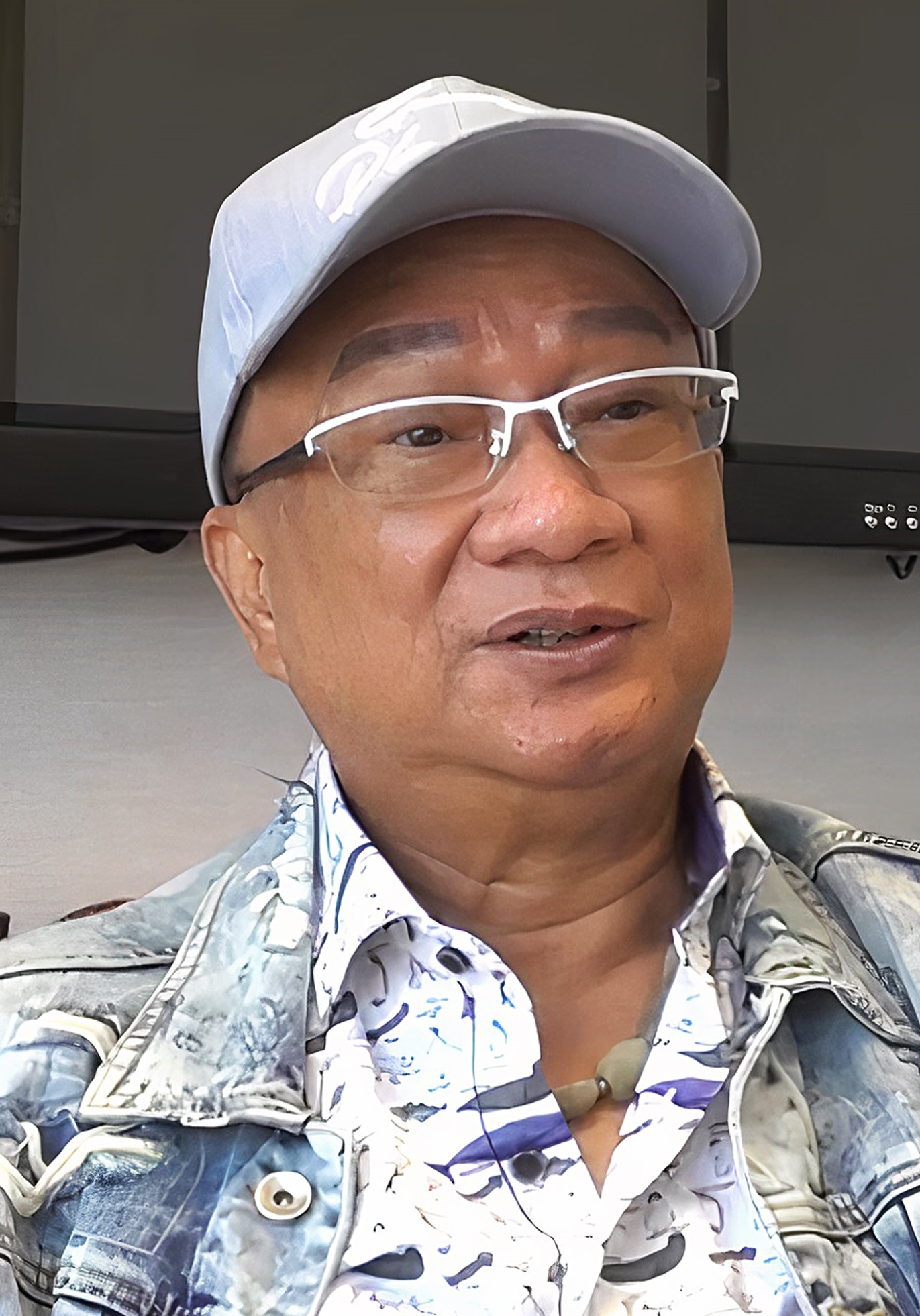
- Tsui in an interview in 2019
- Born: 28 November 1953 (age 72); Hong Kong
- Occupations: screenwriter; film producer; actor; assistant director; production manager; action choreographer

Chinese name
Transcriptions
Standard Mandarin
- Hanyu Pinyin: Xú2 Xiǎo3 Míng2
Yue: Cantonese
- Jyutping: Ceoi4 Siu2 Ming4
- Musical career
- Also known as: Xu Xiaoming; Siuming Tsui

Tsui Siu-ming (Chinese: 徐小明; born 1953) is a Hong Kong–based actor, screenwriter, film producer, assistant director, production manager, and action choreographer.

== Career ==
A native of Guangdong, Tsui was once a recognized child star. In addition to being an actor, he also co-wrote and was an uncredited co-director of the 1980 film The Buddhist Fist. He also tried his hand at singing during the 1970s and 1980s with such tunes as "The New Chameleon" (新變色龍), "Za Xiang Hu Shan Xing" (再向虎山行) and "Huei Sheng Gu Li Nian Li Qing" (回聲谷裡念離情).

He also produced drama serials for Rediffusion Television (RTV) such as the rating-topper "Chameleon". Tsui worked for ATV in 1998 and became CEO of Emperor Motion Pictures in the subsequent year where he was responsible for film and TV business development.

In March 2005, he founded Sundream Motion Pictures, a subsidiary of pay TV provider I-CABLE Communications Ltd., producing films such as Twins Mission and Eye in the Sky.
