= Fan Mei-sheng =

Chinese actor

- 樊梅生
- Born: 13 September 1942 (age 83); Shandong, China
- Other names: Fan Mui-sang
- Occupations: actor, director, producer, manager, educator
- Years active: 1964–1994, 2018
- Children: Louis Fan

Fan Mei-sheng (樊梅生; born 13 September 1942) also known as Fan Mui-sang, is a prolific Hong Kong Cantonese actor.

Fan Mei-sheng started acting in movies from 1964; his first movie was The Story of Sue San. He made his name in Shaw Brothers Studio productions, including the role of 'Black Whirlwind' in All Men Are Brothers. Through the 1970s and 1980s, he was often cast as the villain in many Hong Kong martial arts films and thrillers. In 1979, Fan replaced Simon Yuen (who died during filming) in The Magnificent Butcher, which became one of his best-known performances. He played the role of Fat Master in the 1980 film The Buddhist Fist. His role as an explosives man in the 1982 film The Postman Fights Back became another one of his best-known performances. He also acted in the 1985 Michael Cimino film Year of the Dragon; and in total has acted in one hundred films. In addition, he directed one film, Amsterdam Connection, in 1978, and produced another, Dark Side of Chinatown, in 1989.

Mei-sheng is the father of actor Louis Fan Siu-wong, with whom he appeared in the 1992 film Riki-Oh: The Story of Ricky. He retired from acting in 1994, and has since been his son's manager, as well as a professor at the Shanghai School of Performing Arts. He had a minor role, again alongside his son, in the 2018 film Attrition.
