= Yuen Cheung-yan =

Hong Kong actor and film director (1957–2026)

- Born: 1957; Guangzhou, China
- Died: 1 January 2026 (aged 68); Hong Kong
- Occupations: Actor; director; stuntman; fight choreographer
- Years active: 1965–2025
- Parent: Yuen Siu-tien (1912–1979)
- Awards: Hong Kong Film Awards – Best Action Choreography; 1992 Once Upon a Time in China

Chinese name
- Traditional Chinese: 袁祥仁
- Simplified Chinese: 袁祥仁
Transcriptions
Standard Mandarin
- Hanyu Pinyin: Yuán Xiángrén
Yue: Cantonese
- Jyutping: Jyun4 Coeng4 Jan4

Yuen Cheung-yan (Chinese: 袁祥仁; pinyin: Yuán Xiángrén; 1957 – 1 January 2026) was a Hong Kong actor, director, stuntman and fight choreographer who worked for many years in the Hong Kong film industry. During the 1970s and early 1980s, he worked with his elder brother, Yuen Woo-ping, and other members of the Yuen family on several films, some of them kung fu comedies such as Shaolin Drunkard (1983) and The Miracle Fighters (1983). He also worked as a fight choreographer for American films like Charlie's Angels (2000).

On 1 January 2026, Yuen died at Queen Elizabeth Hospital in Hong Kong, at the age of 68.

== Filmography ==
=== As actor ===
Year	Title	Chinese Title	Role	Notes
1967	The One-Armed Swordsman	獨臂刀	Chi student	
1968	Golden Swallow	金燕子		
1973	Police Woman	女警察		
1980	The Buddhist Fist	佛掌羅漢拳	Leader of Thugs	
1982	The Miracle Fighters	奇門遁甲	Tun Kap / Old Woman	
1983	Shaolin Drunkard	天師撞邪		
1984	Drunken Tai Chi	笑太極	Puppeteer	
1991	Once Upon a Time in China	黃飛鴻		
1992	King of Beggars	武狀元蘇乞兒	Hung Yat-San	
1993	Flying Dagger	神經刀與飛天貓	Never Die	
1993	Tai Chi Master	太極張三豐	Reverend Ling	
1994	Fist of Legend	精武英雄	Inspector Jie Yun-kui	
2004	Kung Fu Hustle	功夫	The Beggar	
2014	Once Upon a Time in Shanghai	惡戰	Laughing Buddha	
2014	Kung Fu Jungle (a.k.a. Kung Fu Killer)	一個人的武林	Lui Ching-yuen	Credited as a "Guest Appearance"
2017	Vampire Cleanup Department			

=== As director ===
Year	Title	Chinese Title	Notes
1984	Taoism Drunkard	鬼馬天師	
1985	Lucky Diamond	祝您好運	
1989	Dark Side of Chinatown	西雅圖大屠殺	
1989	Funny Ghost	猛鬼撞鬼	
1989	Live Hard	鐵膽雄風	
1990	Coup de Grace	起尾注	
1990	Here Comes a Vampire	猛鬼霸王花	
1992	Wizard's Curse	妖怪都市	
1993	Kung Fu Vampire	湘西屍王	

=== As fight choreographer ===
Year	Title	Chinese Title	Notes
1982	The Miracle Fighters	奇門遁甲	Nominated for second Hong Kong Film Award for Best Action Choreography
1988	In the Line of Duty III - Force of the Dragon	皇家師姐III：雌雄大盜	
1990	Pedicab Driver	群龍戲鳳	Nominated for ninth Hong Kong Film Award for Best Action Choreography
1991	Once Upon a Time in China	黃飛鴻	Winner of the eleventh Hong Kong Film Award for Best Action Choreography
1993	Iron Monkey	少年黃飛鴻之鐵馬騮	Nominated for the thirteenth Hong Kong Film Award for Best Action Choreography
2000	Charlie's Angels	n/a	
2003	Daredevil	n/a	
2003	Charlie's Angels: Full Throttle	n/a	
2003	The Matrix Reloaded	n/a	
2003	The Matrix Revolutions	n/a	
