= Yuen Shun-yi =

Hong Kong actor

Sunny Yuen Shun-yi
- Occupation: Martial arts actor
- Parent: Yuen Siu-tien (father)
- Relatives: Yuen Woo-ping, Yuen Cheung-yan (brothers)
- Awards: 11th Hong Kong Film Awards – Best Action Choreography; 1992 Once Upon a Time in China

Chinese name
- Traditional Chinese: 袁信義
- Simplified Chinese: 袁信义
Transcriptions
Standard Mandarin
- Hanyu Pinyin: Yuán Xìnyì
Yue: Cantonese
- Jyutping: Jyun4 Seon3ji6

Sunny Yuen Shun-yi (Chinese: 袁信義), also credited as Shun-yee Yuen, is a Hong Kong martial artist, actor, stuntman, and action coordinator.

== Biography ==
Yuen was the fourth of ten children of the martial artist Yuen Siu-tien. He began training in kung fu with his father from a young age. His elder brothers, Yuen Woo-ping and Yuen Cheung-yan, were also kung fu actors and directors.

Together with his brothers, Shun-yi appeared in many films made by the Yuen clan, which was one of the foremost makers of Hong Kong martial arts films. In the 1970s, he followed his brother Yuen Woo-ping to make films in Taiwan. Although he played a few leading roles in his early career, he was better known for his supporting roles as villains. He made many appearances in the Once Upon a Time in China film series.

== Selected filmography ==
As actor

- Disciples of Shaolin (1975) as Thug
- Dance of the Drunk Mantis (1979) as Foggy
- The Buddhist Fist (1980) as Ah Hsiang (lead role)
- Dreadnaught (1981) as White Tiger, a psychotic murderer hiding out in a Peking Opera troupe
- Iron Monkey (1993) as Fox

== Awards and nominations ==
Yuen worked as an action and stunt director in many martial arts films, and was nominated for the Hong Kong Film Award for Best Action Choreography seven times. He won the prize at the 11th Hong Kong Film Awards in 1992 for the film Once Upon a Time in China, together with his brother Yuen Cheung-yan and Lau Kar-wing. In 2018, he was nominated for the Best Action Choreography Award at the 55th Golden Horse Awards for the film Master Z: Ip Man Legacy.
