= Yuen Woo-ping =

Hong Kong film director

- 袁和平
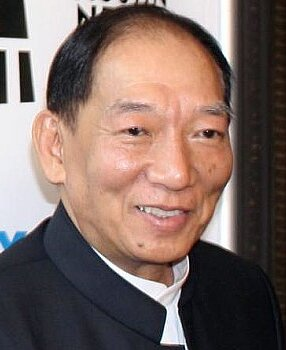
- Yuen at the Fantastic Fest in Austin, Texas in 2010 at the premiere of True Legend
- Born: 24 August 1945 (age 81); Guangzhou, Guangdong, China
- Father: Yuen Siu-tien
- Awards: Hong Kong Film Awards – Best Action Choreography 2001 Crouching Tiger, Hidden Dragon; 2005 Kung Fu Hustle; 2007 Fearless; 2014 The Grandmaster; 2020 Ip Man 4 Hong Kong Film Awards – Professional Achievement Award; 2001; Hong Kong Film Critics Society Awards – Special Achievement Award; 2000 Crouching Tiger, Hidden Dragon Golden Horse Awards – 37th Best Action Choreography; 2000 Crouching Tiger, Hidden Dragon

Chinese name
- Chinese: 袁和平
Transcriptions
Standard Mandarin
- Hanyu Pinyin: Yuán Hépíng
Yue: Cantonese
- Jyutping: Jyun4 Wo4ping4

Yuen Woo-ping (Chinese: 袁和平; pinyin: Yuán Hépíng; alias: Yuen Wo-ping; born 24 August 1945) is a Hong Kong martial arts choreographer and film director who worked in Hong Kong action cinema and later Hollywood films. He is one of the inductees on the Avenue of Stars in Hong Kong. Yuen is also a son of Yuen Siu-tien, a martial arts film actor. He attended the China Drama Academy for one year as a day student of Master Yu Jim-yuen as well.

== Life and career ==
Yuen was born in Guangzhou, Guangdong, China. With a support of Ng See-yuen, he achieved his first directing credit in 1978 on the seminal Snake in the Eagle's Shadow, starring Jackie Chan, followed quickly by Drunken Master. The films were smash hits, launching Jackie Chan as a major film star, turning Seasonal Films into a major independent production company, and starting a trend towards comedy in martial arts films that continues to the following two decades.

Yuen went on to helm other star vehicles for such figures as Sammo Hung in Magnificent Butcher (1979), Yuen Biao in Dreadnaught (1981), Donnie Yen in Iron Monkey (1993), Jet Li in Tai Chi Master (1993), and Michelle Yeoh in Wing Chun (1994).

Yuen's works, particularly his action choreography on Fist of Legend (1994), attracted the attention of the Wachowskis, who hired him as the martial arts choreographer on The Matrix (1999). The success of this collaboration, plus his action choreography on the following year's hit Crouching Tiger, Hidden Dragon, made him a highly sought after figure in Hollywood. He went on to work on the first two Matrix sequels, as well as Kill Bill: Volume 1 (2003) and Kill Bill: Volume 2 (2004).

More recent action choreography duties in Hong Kong cinema have included Kung Fu Hustle (2004), starring Stephen Chow, and Fearless (2006), starring Jet Li.

Yuen also choreographed the action sequences in The Forbidden Kingdom (2008), a Hollywood martial arts–adventure film, which was the first film to star together two of the best-known names in the martial arts film genre, Jackie Chan and Jet Li. He worked as a fight choreography consultant on Ninja Assassin (2009).

In late 2010, Yuen released his first film as director since 1996, True Legend, starring Vincent Zhao, Jay Chou and David Carradine (in a minor role).

Yuen went on to work as stunt co-ordinator in two South Indian films, Enthiran (2010) and I (2014), both directed by S. Shankar.

In 2015, Yuen directed Crouching Tiger, Hidden Dragon: Sword of Destiny, re-creating many of his signature action choreographies.

The annual and highly anticipated Hong Kong International Film Festival was held for its 45th edition in April 2021. Yuen is one of the six veteran Hong Kong filmmakers who contributed segments to the Johnnie To-produced anthology film Septet: The Story of Hong Kong. The other filmmakers who directed segments are Sammo Hung, Ann Hui On-wah, Patrick Tam, Tsui Hark and Ringo Lam. The short films were shot entirely on 35mm film with each of them touches on a nostalgic and moving story set across different time periods, with every one acting as an ode to the city.

== Filmography ==
=== As director ===
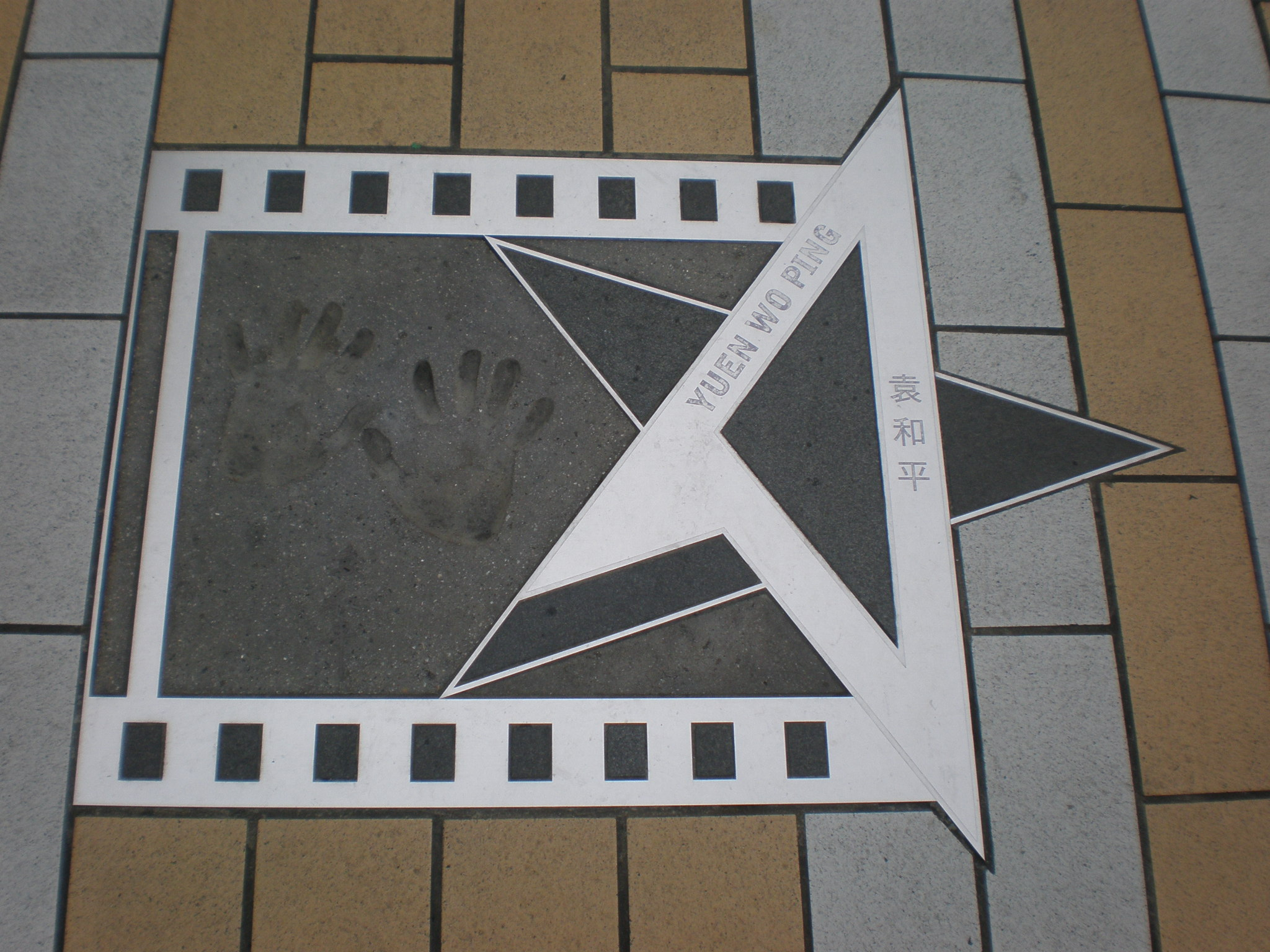
Yuen's star on the Avenue of Stars

- Snake in the Eagle's Shadow (1978) (Cantonese title: Se ying diu sau)
- Drunken Master (1978) (Cantonese title: Jui kuen)
- Dance of the Drunk Mantis (1979) (Mandarin title: Nan bei zui quan)
- The Magnificent Butcher (1979) (Mandarin title: Lin shi rong)
- The Buddhist Fist (1980) (Mandarin title: Fo Zhang luo han quan)
- Dreadnaught (1981) (Mandarin title: Yong zhe wu ju)
- The Miracle Fighters (1982) (Qi men dun jia)
- Legend of a Fighter (1982) (Huo Yuan-Jia)
- Shaolin Drunkard (1983) (Tian shi zhuang xie)
- Drunken Tai Chi (1984) (Xiao tai ji)
- Mismatched Couples (1985) (Qing feng di shou)
- The Close Encounter of the Vampire (a.k.a. Dragon Vs. Vampire (1986) (Jiang shi pa pa)
- Tiger Cage (1988) (Te jing tu long)
- In the Line of Duty 4: Witness (1989) (Huang jia shi jie zhi IV: Zhi ji zheng ren)

a.k.a. In the Line of Duty
a.k.a. In the Line of Duty IV
a.k.a. Yes, Madam 4

- Tiger Cage 2 (1990) (Xi hei qian)
- Tiger Cage 3 (1991) (Leng mian ju ji shou)
- Su qi er (1993)

a.k.a. Fist of the Red Dragon (USA: video title)
a.k.a. Heroes Among Heroes

- Iron Monkey (1993)
- Tai Chi Master (1993)
- Wing Chun (1994)
- Huo yun chuan qi (1994)

a.k.a. Fire Dragon

- Hu meng wei long (1995)

a.k.a. Red Wolf

- Tai ji quan (1996)

a.k.a. Tai Chi Boxer (Hong Kong: English title) (UK: literal English title)
a.k.a. Tai Chi 2

- True Legend (2010)

a.k.a. True Legend of Beggar Su (Working title)

- Crouching Tiger, Hidden Dragon: Sword of Destiny (2016)
- The Thousand Faces of Dunjia (2017)
- Master Z: Ip Man Legacy (2018)
- Septet: The Story of Hong Kong (2020)
- Blades of the Guardians (2026)

=== Selected filmography as action choreographer/fight advisor ===
- The Bloody Fists (1972)
- The Awaken Punch (1973)
- Bruce Lee and I (1976)
- Secret Rivals 2 (1977)
- Snuff Bottle Connection (1977)
- Broken Oath (1977)
- Born Invincible (1978)
- Snake in the Eagle's Shadow (1978)
- Drunken Master (1978)
- Tower of Death (1980)
- Once Upon a Time in China II (1992)
- Last Hero in China (1993)
- Fist of Legend (1994)
- Black Mask (1996)
- The Water Margin (1998)
- The Matrix (1999)
- Crouching Tiger, Hidden Dragon (2000)
- Black Mask 2: City of Masks (2002)
- The Matrix Reloaded (2003)
- The Matrix Revolutions (2003)
- Kill Bill: Volume 1 (2003)
- Kill Bill: Volume 2 (2004)
- Kung Fu Hustle (2004)
- Danny the Dog (a.k.a. Unleashed) (2005)
- House of Fury (2005)
- Fearless (2006)
- The Forbidden Kingdom (2008)
- Enthiran (2010)
- The Grandmaster (2013)
- Once Upon a Time in Shanghai (2013)
- Man of Tai Chi (2013)
- I (2015)
- Ip Man 3 (2015)
- Gong Shou Dao (2017)
- Ip Man 4: The Finale (2019)
- Blades of the Guardians (2026)

=== Actor ===
- Mismatched Couples (1985) as Mini
- Eastern Condors (1987) as Grandpa Yun Yen-hoy
- The Wicked City (1992) as Sergeant Kayama
- The Grandmaster (2013) as Chan Wah-shun
- Man of Tai Chi (2013) as Man at fight club (uncredited)

== Awards and nominations ==
Year	Award	Category	Nomination	Result	Ref.
2000	Golden Horse Awards	Best Action Choreography	Crouching Tiger, Hidden Dragon	Won	
2006	Golden Horse Awards	Best Action Choreography	Fearless	Nominated	
