= Seasonal Film Corporation =

Hong Kong film company (1974–2008)

- Type: Public company
- Industry: Film production
- Predecessor: Pacific Television Corporation
- Founded: 1974
- Founder: Ng See-yuen
- Defunct: 2008
- Fate: Bankruptcy
- Successors: Studio: The Halcyon Company; Library: Warner Bros. (through Turner Entertainment); Sony Pictures (through Destination Films)
- Headquarters: Hong Kong
- Key people: Ng See-yuen; Roy Horan
- Products: Movies

Seasonal Film Corporation (Chinese: 思遠影業公司) was an independent film company from Hong Kong, originally founded by the ex-assistant Shaw Brothers movie director Ng See-yuen in 1974. One of their first films was Call Me Dragon in 1974, starring Bruce Liang, Kurata Yasuaki and Mang Hoi. Seasonal Film Corporation was one of the well known independent filming company in Hong Kong and who was also responsible with likes of martial arts stars such as Jackie Chan, Hwang Jang-lee, Jean-Claude Van Damme, Yuen Woo Ping, Bruce Liang, Alan Chui Chung-San and Corey Yuen, John Liu, Don Wong Tao, Conan Lee, Hiroyuki Sanada. The company became known for films such as Secret Rivals, Snake in the Eagle's Shadow, and Drunken Master, and became defunct in 2008.

== Beginning ==
Ng See-yuen originally started the company in Hong Kong in 1974, starting off with a few of the Bruce Liang movies, such as the likes of Call Me Dragon, Bruce Lee, D-Day at Macao (a.k.a. Little Superman) and the European and HK co-production Kidnap in Rome. Soon, their popularity started to rise when they released the movie Secret Rivals in 1976 and its following sequel Secret Rivals 2 in 1977, becoming their most successful films through the late '70s.

Other films produced by the company through Ng (during 1974 to early 1978) include Hong Kong crime film Anti-Corruption (1975), and comedy film What Price? – Stardom (1977). Despite these early films, Seasonal did not gain much attention until their later productions; however, their production quality still gained positive reactions and slowly made Seasonal Films a household name in the Hong Kong film industry.

== Popularity and the early 1980s ==
The company started to get more attention when Yuen Woo-ping marked his directorial debut on both Drunken Master and Snake in the Eagle's Shadow with the likes of Jackie Chan and Hwang Jang-lee. Giving Jackie Chan a chance to approach a more comedic kung fu style, the films not only expanded the popularity of Jackie Chan, but also gave a proper position for Ng See-yuen to set Seasonal as his own independent production company.

The company further increased its popularity with directors like Tsui Hark, who made his first two films (The Butterfly Murders and We're Going to Eat You) with Seasonal from 1979 to 1980.

The company was also responsible for the Japanese and Hong Kong co-production (and Corey Yuen's directorial debut) Ninja in the Dragon's Den, starring Conan Lee and Hiroyuki Sanada. It popularized the ninja movie genre in Hong Kong and was also very successful in the Japanese film market.

Other Seasonal films from throughout the late '70s to the early '80s include: Leslie Cheung's feature debut adult film Erotic Dream of the Red Chamber (1978), the follow-up sequel to Drunken Master known as Dance of the Drunk Mantis (1979), several action-packed acrobatic flicks such as Two Fists Against the Law, Ring of Death and The Lackey and the Lady Tiger, an historical kung fu film based on Huo Yuan Jia known as Legend of a Fighter (1982), and an epic Hong Kong war film with Chow Yun-fat and Rosamund Kwan known as The Head Hunter (1982).

== Hollywood Pictures ==
Following these successes, Ng See-yuen began to expand his production company further. They began to release some American-style kickboxing movies with New World Pictures, including the No Retreat, No Surrender trilogy from 1986 to 1989.

Some of Seasonal Film's Hollywood pictures are also responsible for establishing stars such as Jean-Claude Van Damme and Kurt McKinney, who made their debut in the first No Retreat, No Surrender film.

== Defunct ==
One of the Seasonal Film Corporation's last films was Wu Jing's 2008 film Legendary Assassin. The company became defunct around late 2008.

== Films ==
=== Hong Kong productions ===
- The Bloody Fists (1972)
- Bruce Lee, D-Day at Macao (Little Superman) (1974)
- Call Me Dragon (1974)
- Anti Corruption (1975)
- Secret Rivals (1976)
- Secret Rivals 2 (1977)
- What Price? - Stardom (1977)
- Snake in the Eagle's Shadow (1978)
- Drunken Master (1978)
- Erotic Dream of the Red Chamber (1978)
- Kung Fu Vs. Yoga (1979)
- Dance of the Drunk Mantis (Drunken Master: Part 2) (1979)
- The Butterfly Murders (1979)
- Two for the Road (1980)
- We're Going to Eat You (1980)
- Without a Promised Land (1980)
- Lackey and the Lady Tiger (1980)
- The Ring of Death (1980)
- Two Fists Against the Law (1980)
- The Sweet and Sour Cop (1981)
- Game of Death II (Tower of Death) (1981)
- Legend of a Fighter (1982)
- Ninja in the Dragon's Den (1982)
- The Head Hunter (1982)
- Walks on Fire (1987)
- Mister Mistress (1988)
- All for the Winner (1990)
- Dragon Inn (1992)
- Twin Dragons (1992)
- Green Snake (1993)
- Evening Liaison (1996)
- Bloodmoon (1997)
- Deja Vu (1999)
- Legendary Assassin (2008)

=== Documentaries ===
- The Art of High Impact Kicking (Documentary) (1981)
- Tiger and Crane Shaolin Kung Fu (Documentary) (1981)

=== Hollywood films ===
- No Retreat, No Surrender (1986)
- No Retreat, No Surrender 2 (1987)
- No Retreat, No Surrender 3: Blood Brothers (1989)
- The King of the Kickboxers (1990)
- American Shaolin (1991)
- Superfights (1995)
- Bloodmoon (1997)
