= No Retreat, No Surrender 3: Blood Brothers =

1990 American martial arts film

- Promotional video poster
- Directed by: Lucas Lowe
- Written by: Keith W. Stranberg
- Produced by: Keith W. Stranberg
- Starring: Loren Avedon; Keith Vitali; Joseph Campanella
- Cinematography: John Huneck
- Edited by: Allan Poon
- Music by: Richard Yuen
- Distributed by: Seasonal Film Corporation; Imperial Releasing (VHS, US)
- Release date: January 25, 1990
- Running time: 101 minutes
- Country: United States
- Language: English

No Retreat, No Surrender 3: Blood Brothers is a 1990 American action film directed by Lucas Lowe and starring Loren Avedon and Keith Vitali. While financed by Seasonal Entertainment, it does not have any narrative or character connection to No Retreat, No Surrender or the sequel, both directed by Corey Yuen. It is the third installment in the No Retreat, No Surrender franchise.

== Plot ==
Terrorists hold a bank hostage with police surrounding the building. CIA agent Casey Alexander eventually saves the hostages, but is shot in the arm in the process.

Meanwhile, Casey's father John, a retired CIA agent, learns that he is on a hit list. John, however, refuses protection from the CIA.

At John's 65th birthday, Casey arrives before his brother, a martial arts teacher named Will. Will is wearing the Soviet flag on the back of his jean jacket. Casey tells John that the brothers got him an around the world flight for his birthday. Will, however, is mad that Casey will not admit that he is a spy and will not stop showing off his wealth. Casey says that he does not like the fact Will is wearing "Khrushchev's jacket" in front of the CIA.

That night, John is subdued by men dressed in black. One of them is Colombian terrorist Antonio "Franco" Franconi, who wants to get revenge on John for his son's death in a mission years before. Aided by his number one man Russo, Franco kills John. When Will and Casey discover John's body, Casey vows to find out who is responsible.

CIA director Jack Atteron refuses to give John's case to Casey, who, aided by an old friend in the IT department, nonetheless retrieves the file. While heading home, Casey is confronted by more terrorists, but kills them all with some help from Will. While Casey talks with the police, Will opens John's file, learns that Franco is in Florida and decides to go there alone.

Will meets up with old friends at a martial arts school in Tampa and asks for their help in finding Angel, a recruiter for Franco's organization. Meanwhile, Casey looks for his old girlfriend Maria, who is also infiltrating Franco. At a bar that night, Will's friends beat up Angel's men. As Angel is about to be beaten down, Will faces off against them as part of the plan. Will calls himself "Jessie Roby" and Angel takes him to see Franco. Franco decides to test "Jessie". Will faces off against a thug, matches skills with Russo and passes the test.

The next day, Will and two men go to a house where it is revealed that he must kill Casey. Will "kills" Casey, who fakes strangulation by curtain. Upon returning to the base, Franco's supervisor is revealed to be Atteron, who was also responsible for John's death. Casey and Will are kidnapped, tied up and confronted by Russo and Franco. Will sees Casey being beaten and announces that he will not do the job if Casey is dead.

The mission is to kidnap the Mozambique Ambassador, who will be arriving at Tampa International Airport. However, it is a distraction for the real plan, the assassination of President George H. W. Bush. Will is hired because of his martial arts skills. Meanwhile, Casey and a now kidnapped Maria escape from Franco's men and head toward the airport. Casey catches up to Will and the Ambassador, whom they put on a plane to confront Franco and Russo, the latter armed with a rocket launcher aimed at Air Force One. Maria, who believes that Will is a criminal, shoots him in the shoulder, only to be stopped by Casey.

In the ensuing fight, Will delivers a roundhouse kick to Russo's face, causing him to fall to his death. Franco knocks Will to the ground, but then, Casey intervenes. Working together, the brothers attack Franco, who is eventually shot dead by Atteron. Before he can kill the brothers to cover all of his tracks, Atteron is shot dead by Maria. Casey offers Will a job with the CIA, but Will refuses. The CIA and the Tampa police later appear with an arrested Angel.

== Cast ==
- Loren Avedon as Will Alexander
- Keith Vitali as Casey Alexander
- Joseph Campanella as John Alexander
- Rion Hunter as Antonio "Franco" Franconi
- Mark Russo as Russo, Franco's Henchman
- Luke Askew as Jack Atteron
- David Michael Sterling as Angel
- Wanda Acuna as Maria
- Philip Benson as MacPherson
- Sherrie Rose as Jodie
- Aasif Mandvi as Terrorist
- Marc Macaulay as Terrorist

== Production ==
The character of Casey Alexander was written to have a cast on his arm the day before shooting began. On that day, action director Tony Leung Siu-Hung asked Loren Avedon and Keith Vitali to show their martial arts skills for the choreography. When Avedon performed a double jump back kick to a punching bag, Leung asked Vitali if he can do that move. Vitali's attempt resulted in a broken wrist. Therefore, writer Keith W. Strandberg wrote it in that Casey was shot in the opening sequence, thus having him wear the cast for the entire film.

This film was released as Kick Boxer 2 in Europe. It was featured briefly in the film The King of the Kickboxers, which was also produced by Seasonal Film and, coincidentally, has been released as No Retreat, No Surrender 4 and Karate Tiger 5.

== Release ==
=== Home media ===
The film was released on VHS in 1991 by Imperial Entertainment in the United States and by CFP Video in Canada. It was never released on Region 1 DVD and as of 2009, there have been no plans to do so. It has however been readily available on Region 4 DVD and Region 2 DVD in both Australia and Europe since 2005.

In August 2004, DVD was released by Universal Studios at the UK in Region 2.
