= New York Ninja =

2021 American action film

- Promotional release poster by Tom Hodge
- Directed by: Original director: John Liu; "Re-director": Kurtis M. Spieler
- Written by: John Liu (original screenplay); Kurtis M. Spieler (reconstructed screenplay)
- Starring: John Liu
- Edited by: Kurtis M. Spieler
- Music by: Voyag3r
- Distributed by: Vinegar Syndrome
- Release date: October 2021 (Beyond Fest)
- Running time: 93 minutes
- Country: United States
- Language: English

New York Ninja is a 2021 American action film written, directed by and starring John Liu. Liu plays a vigilante ninja in New York City who seeks revenge after his wife is murdered. New York Ninja was shot in 1984, but was not completed until 2021, when its footage was discovered and restored by the film preservation and home video distributor Vinegar Syndrome.

New York Ninja was filmed in New York City, and was shelved after its original distribution company went bankrupt. The abandoned footage was eventually acquired by Vinegar Syndrome; without audio, storyboards, or scripts, it was reconstructed by a new director, Kurtis M. Spieler. Dubbed dialogue was recorded by actors including Don Wilson, Michael Berryman, Cynthia Rothrock, Linnea Quigley, Vince Murdocco, Matt Mitler, Leon Isaac Kennedy, and Ginger Lynn Allen. Spieler commissioned the Detroit band Voyag3r to create the score. It received positive reviews.

== Plot ==
John Liu is a sound technician for a television news station in New York City. His pregnant wife, Nita, is murdered by a knife-wielding thug, Freddy Cufflinks. While grieving, Liu is accosted by a gang of thugs, and fights them off. Detective Jimmy Williams tells him that authorities are doing all they can to solve Nita's murder, but Liu is unsatisfied. Liu decides to become a vigilante, donning a ninja outfit and arming himself with katanas and throwing stars.

Liu interrupts an attempted gang rape by dispatching the perpetrators with shuriken. He then retrieves a purse and jewelry stolen from a tourist couple by pursuing and intercepting the thieves while on roller skates, an act which is caught on camera by news reporters on the scene. Liu's actions make the front page of the newspaper, catching the attention of a wanted serial killer known as the Plutonium Killer. The Plutonium Killer is the ringleader of a prostitution ring in which women are abducted and sold to an international clientele.

Liu stops a gang from assaulting two women, while his TV station co-workers—reporter Randi Rydell and cameraman Jack, who are unaware of Liu's secret identity—film the ensuing fight, from which Liu emerges victorious. Liu later saves Randi and Jack from being attacked by thugs. As Liu continues to police the streets as the "New York Ninja", he garners further news coverage and popularity among the city's residents.

When a young boy is attacked by a group of criminals to whom he owes money, Liu saves his life. Several weeks later, Liu has befriended the boy, and the two go fishing and attend a Halloween parade. At the same parade, the Plutonium Killer hypnotizes and kidnaps a woman. He brings her to his car, where they have sex while parts of his skin melt. The next morning, the Plutonium Killer and the woman are still in the backseat when two thugs attempt to rob the car; the attempted robbers are defeated by the Plutonium Killer's driver, Rattail. Police later find the woman's dead body in an alley, and attribute her murder to the Plutonium Killer.

While filming an interview with Mayor Lewis about the New York Ninja, a group of armed assailants under the orders of the Plutonium Killer—including Freddy Cufflinks—attempt to abduct Randi. However, the criminals are driven away by a group of children who, inspired by the New York Ninja's vigilantism, are wearing ninja outfits and "I Love New York Ninja" paraphernalia. Some time later, Cufflinks and his partners Ricco and Switchblade successfully kidnap both Randi and Detective Janet Flores, one of Williams' colleagues. After learning about the Plutonium Killer's trafficking scheme from an undercover Interpol agent known as the Pale Man, Williams meets with Liu and informs him that the Plutonium Killer and his associates are responsible for Nita's death.

Liu confronts Cufflinks, Ricco, Switchblade, and the Plutonium Killer. They try to capture Liu but he escapes to a field, where he defeats Rattail in a sword duel. Elsewhere, by burning a photo of Jack, the Plutonium Killer transforms his face into Jack's likeness. Liu and Williams infiltrate a dungeon where the Plutonium Killer's kidnapped women, including Flores, are being held captive, and free them. The Plutonium Killer, disguised as Jack, attempts to lure Randi away. However, Liu, by reflecting the sunlight off a mirror, causes the Plutonium Killer's false face to melt and fall away. The Plutonium Killer abducts Randi in his car, and drives to a hangar. Liu follows and Randi slips away when Liu engages in a sword fight with the Plutonium Killer, before the criminal escapes in a helicopter. Liu plants a bomb in the helicopter, causing an explosion that kills the Plutonium Killer. The NYPD briefly apprehends Liu before the group of children return, enabling his escape.

== Cast ==
- John Liu as John Liu, an employee of a New York City television news station
  - Don Wilson as the voice of Liu
- Linnea Quigley as the voice of Randi Rydell
- Vince Murdocco as the voice of Jack "The Cameraman"
- Leon Isaac Kennedy as the voice of Detective Jimmy Williams
- Cynthia Rothrock as the voice of Detective Janet Flores
- Matt Mitler as the voice of Freddy Cufflinks
- Ginger Lynn Allen as the voice of Nita Liu
- Zihan Zhao as the voice of the Kid
- Bill Timoney as the voice of the Pale Man
- Darius Churchman as the voice of Ricco
- Tom Wayland as the voice of Switchblade
- Wayne Grayson as the voice of Rattail
- Michael Berryman as the voice of the Plutonium Killer

The pornographic actress Sharon Mitchell has a cameo on the subway train.

== Production ==
Filming for New York Ninja began in late 1984 in New York City. According to the film's special effects artist, Carl Morano, "They had zero resources. Different people showed up on different days. We'd meet every morning at the Howard Johnson's where John [Liu] was staying and then take a van to the location." The film had an estimated special effects budget of $100, most of which Morano reportedly spent on creating the Plutonium Killer's melting face.

Despite advertisements for the film appearing in trade magazines in 1984, the footage shot for New York Ninja was shelved after its distribution company, 21st Century Distribution Corporation, went bankrupt and sold its assets.

== Reconstruction and release ==
"What I tried to do was make the most coherent thing I could with the footage I had."

— Kurtis M. Spieler, "re-director" and editor of New York Ninja.

The footage shot for New York Ninja was stored in film reels, ran about six to eight hours in length and included no actor credits. It was eventually acquired by Vinegar Syndrome, a film preservation and home video distribution company. Without audio, storyboards, or scripts, Kurtis M. Spieler (credited as the film's "re-director" and editor) was tasked with reconstructing the film from the footage alone. The only known surviving script is Morano's shooting script, which alluded to a character named "Detective Dolemite"; the original filmmakers may have intended the character to have been played by Rudy Ray Moore, who appeared in the 1975 film Dolemite.

Spieler suspects that Liu may have been unable to complete filming before the production shut down, saying that "the ending doesn't feel like it was ever finished". Vinegar Syndrome considered filming new scenes, but Spieler decided to work only with the original footage. In an interview with The New York Times, he said: "I asked myself, 'If my job was to have been an editor in the 1980s, what would I have done?'" Speaking to Paste, he said:

I was very aware of trying to maintain what I thought was the intended spirit or tone of the original production. I knew there was a fair amount of both intentional and unintentional humor to the movie, but I tried to take the project seriously and be respectful to the original source material as well as other movies from the same time period.

Spieler commissioned the Detroit band Voyag3r to create the score, and hired actors including Don Wilson, Michael Berryman, Cynthia Rothrock, Linnea Quigley, Vince Murdocco, Matt Mitler, Leon Isaac Kennedy and Ginger Lynn to record new dialogue, which was dubbed over the footage.

The reconstructed version of New York Ninja premiered at Beyond Fest in California in October 2021. It was released on Blu-ray by Vinegar Syndrome in November 2021.

== Critical reception ==
On Rotten Tomatoes, the film has an approval rating of 96% based on 23 reviews, with an average rating of 7.3/10. Josiah Teal of Film Threat called the film "rewatchable, quotable, and perfect for a Samurai Cop or Bruceploitation double-feature", and wrote that "Vinegar Syndrome has found/created a fantastic cult classic". J. Hurtado of Screen Anarchy called the film "the kind of gem that demands viewing with a crowd", writing: "As downright goofy as New York Ninja is, it's the genuine heart of the original production that really makes the whole thing work. Liu may not have been a high-minded artiste, but he knew what he wanted, and what he wanted was to bring the high-octane, high-camp action of late '70s Hong Kong to the streets of New York."

== See also ==
- List of ninja films
- "So bad it's good"
