= Loren Avedon =

American martial artist and actor

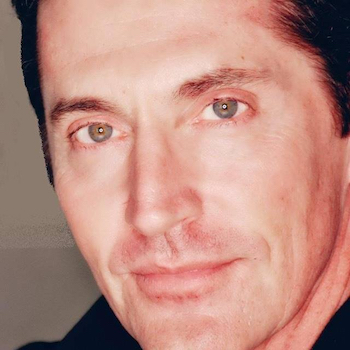
- Born: Los Angeles, U.S.
- Education: UCLA Extension
- Occupations: Martial artist, actor, filmmaker
- Spouse: single
- Children: 1 (daughter)

Loren Rains Avedon is an American martial artist and actor best known for his portrayal of heroic martial protagonists like Scott Wylde and Jake Donahue in both No Retreat, No Surrender 2 & 4.

== Early life ==
Loren Avedon was born Loren Avedon Rains on July 30, 1962, the son of Burt Avedon and Jeanne Rains. He took his father's name at age 18. He is the second cousin of famous photographer Richard Avedon.

== Biography ==
Avedon was already in front of the camera in several Carnation commercials at the age of 5. In addition to many appearances in martial arts films like No Retreat, No Surrender 2, No Retreat, No Surrender 3: Blood Brothers and The King of the Kickboxers and he also worked in television series such as Baywatch and Thunder in Paradise. For the films Deadly Ransom (1998) and The Silent Force (2001), Avedon worked both as an actor and as a co-producer, and on Deadly Ransom as a co-producer as well as wrote the story. For the film Tiger Claws III, Avedon stood both as an actor in front of the camera and as 2nd Unit director.

Avedon is a 9th Dan black belt and Grand Master in Taekwondo. He serves as the Secretary General of the USTF as well. Avedon also holds a 9th Dan black belt in Hapkido certified by the IHF and the WHF.

Loren Avedon was interviewed in 2023 in podcasts by British martial arts action film actor Scott Adkins for The Art of Action Podcast, martial arts podcaster Bruce Willow and also his old friend Keith Vitali in his podcast, who starred with Avedon in No Retreat, No Surrender 3: Blood Brothers as his older brother, Casey.

== Filmography ==
- 1984: Furious
- 1985: Survival
- 1985: Los Angeles Streetfighters
- 1987: No Retreat, No Surrender 2: Raging Thunder
- 1990: No Retreat, No Surrender 3: Blood Brothers
- 1990: No Retreat, No Surrender 4: The King of the Kickboxers
- 1993: Baywatch
- 1994: Operation Golden Phoenix
- 1994: Thunder in Paradise
- 1995: Grid Runners
- 1996: Safety Zone
- 1996: Carjack
- 1998: Deadly Ransom
- 1998: Killing Past
- 1999: Martial Law
- 2000: Tiger Claws III
- 2000: Manhattan Chase
- 2001: The Silent Force
- 2002: The Circuit
- 2003: Into the Heat
- 2006: Circuit 3: The Street Monk
- 2015: Risk Factor
