= John Liu (actor) =

Taiwanese actor and martial artist

- Born: Liu Chungliang 劉忠良; 20 May 1944 (age 82); Taiwan
- Occupation: Actor
- Years active: 1972–2006

Liu Chungliang (commonly credited as John Liu) is a retired Taiwanese actor and martial artist. He mostly appeared in low-budget Taiwanese action/martial art films.

== Martial arts ==
When Liu was young, he learned martial arts from his grandfather who taught him Japanese Karate and Chinese kung fu. In the 1960s, he met Tan Tao-liang who was working as a martial arts instructor at the National Taiwan University. Tan taught Liu Taekwondo. According to Tan, Liu was not really flexible with his kicking when they first met. But through Tan's teaching, Liu was able to greatly improve the flexibility of his legs and his kicking would be featured in all his martial arts movies. Liu is often cited as being one of the best kickers in 1970s and 1980s martial arts films along with his teacher Tan Tao-liang, who also became an actor, Bruce Lee, Sun Chien of the Venom Mob, Casanova Wong, and Hwang Jang-lee who Liu would co-star in 5 films with Hwang often playing the villain to Liu's hero.

== Film career ==
Liu made his debut in 1972 movie Great Boxer as the character Yanoryu Karateka, although it flopped at the box office. His real success came from the movie Secret Rivals, alongside Hwang Jang-lee and Don Wong Tao. Director Ng See-yuen furthermore brought Liu to the attention, with the likes of films such as Snuff Bottle Connection and Secret Rivals 2. Combined with amazing choreography from the likes of Yuen Woo-ping, Corey Yuen and Alan Chui Chung-San, Liu's kicking made him famous.

=== Directing and Zen Kwan Do ===
In 1981, Liu set up his own production company under the name John Liu's (H.K.) Film Corp, initially directing 3 low budget action movies that are all based in Paris (France) and Tenerife (Spain). Liu made a total of 3 films, including Zen Kwan Do Strikes Paris (1981), In the Claws of CIA (1981) and Dragon Blood (1982).

Ever since the downfall of his directed films, he retired from the film business and start to develop his own martial art form, known as Zen Kwan Do, named after his teacher Liu Zen. Liu's martial art form is based on Lau Gar kung fu, with a mixture of Taekwondo and Karate. The form spread through the 80s in Paris while Liu was shooting Zen Kwan Do Strikes Paris. While the form itself is generally unknown by many other martial art fans and students, Zen Kwan Do has maintained a following in France.

=== New York Ninja restoration ===
In 1984, Liu directed a film titled New York Ninja, shot in New York City. While the film was shot, it was never edited and the footage remained dormant in a film lab for decades. In 2020, home video distributor Vinegar Syndrome acquired the footage, and—without access to any audio, storyboards, or scripts from the original production—edited a reconstructed version of the film, with new dialogue recorded and dubbed by such actors as Don Wilson, Cynthia Rothrock, Michael Berryman, and Matt Mitler. The new hybrid production was eventually released in November 2021.

== Retirement and after ==
Liu has returned to the big screen in Robert Tai's Trinity Goes East in 1998 and once more in Il giorno + bello (Any Reason Not To Get Married?) as a cameo appearance in 2006.

== Partial filmography ==
- New York Ninja (2021; filmed in 1984) as John (Director)
- Il giorno + bello (2006) as Street Vendor (Cameo, Final Movie Appearance)
- Trinity Goes East (1998) as Paschy (Producer)
- The Touch of Zen (1992) as Liu (Director, producer, scriptwriter)
- Dragon Blood (1982) as Liu (Director, producer, scriptwriter)
- Secret Rivals 3 (1982) as Shao Yi-fei
- Zen Kwan Do Strikes Paris (1981) as John Liu (Deputy director, producer, scriptwriter)
- In the Claws of CIA (1981) as John Liu/James Liu (2 roles; director, producer, scriptwriter)
- Fighting Ace (1979) as Chee Kao
- The Mar's Villa (1979) as Ma Tien-lang
- Death Duel of Kung Fu (1979) as Sung Hsin
- The Dragon, the Hero (1979) as Tu Wu-shen
- Incredible Kung Fu Mission (1979) as Shao Ting Kang
- Struggle Through Death (1979) as Lung Kang
- Two Great Cavaliers (1978) as Oh Yang-chun
- Shaolin Ex Monk (1978) as Ling Chu-fei
- The Incredible Kung Fu Trio (1978) as Luk Ah-chai
- Secret Rivals 2 (1977) as Shao Yi-fei
- The Invincible Armour (1977) as Chow Wu-feng
- The Instant Kung Fu Man (1977) as Wu Kam
- Snuff Bottle Connection (1977) as Shao Ting-shang
- Secret Rivals (1976) as Shao Yi-fei (Debut)
- Los Kalatrava Contra el Imperio del Karate (1973) Cameo
- The Great Boxer (1972) as Yanoryu Karateka (Cameo)
