= American Shaolin =

1991 American martial arts film

- American Shaolin DVD Cover
- Directed by: Lucas Lowe
- Written by: Keith W. Strandberg
- Produced by: Keith W. Strandberg
- Starring: Reese Madigan; Trent Bushey
- Cinematography: Viking Chiu; Luis Cubilles
- Edited by: Allan Poon
- Music by: Richard Yuen
- Production company: Seasonal Film Corporation
- Release date: 1991
- Running time: 106 minutes
- Country: United States
- Language: English

American Shaolin is a 1991 American martial arts film directed by Lucas Lowe and starring (among others) Reese Madigan, Kim Chan and Daniel Dae Kim.

== Plot ==
While training for the Jersey Shore Karate Championship, ruthless and sadistic kickboxer Trevor Gottitall is put up against a fierce and determined competitor. However, when his opponent's pants unexpectedly fall down during the fight, leaving him in his briefs, his humiliation distracts him long enough for Trevor to easily defeat him. Trevor's trainer uses this opportunity to remind Trevor that beating an opponent is not enough; he also must humiliate him, so that whoever he’s fighting will fear him for life.

During the actual championship, Trevor makes it to the finals, where his opponent is teenager Drew Carson. Drew puts up a determined fight against Trevor, who decides to take his trainer's advice and humiliate Drew in order to win the match. Trevor deprives Drew of his pants, sending the latter landing on the floor in his briefs. Humiliated, Drew crawls out of the ring while being forced to endure the audience’s (and Trevor’s) laughter at his expense.

To add to the insult, Drew's teacher Master Kwan confesses that he is not—as he had claimed—a Shaolin monk, and therefore he had not passed on the actual knowledge of Shaolin kung fu to Drew. Determined to learn the actual art to prevent another such situation, Drew departs for China and arrives at the Shaolin Temple. At first, the monks do not let him enter, but with the help of a pretty tea shop waitress, Ashena (Alice Zhang Hung), and an old monk who gives him a decisive advise, he waits outside of the temple for a week, after which he manages to be admitted. The old monk also turns out to be the abbot of the temple, Master San De, and he and his stern taskmaster train Drew and a number of other young apprentices in the ways of the Shaolin.

At first Drew causes much trouble as his American teenage temperament clashes with the tranquility within the temple and with his fellow student, Gao, but under the rigorous physical and mental training he both improves his fighting skills and learns the meaning of discipline, humility, and patience. He makes friends with Gao and also manages to pass the two final tests: the Test of Spirituality, and the Test of the Chamber. Accepted as a full-fledged member of the Shaolin Monastery, he accompanies—along with Ashena—a delegation of his fellow students and the abbot to a martial arts tournament in Shanghai.

At the tournament, Drew encounters Trevor again. Trevor taunts Drew before proceeding with this match against Gao. Gao initially gains the upper hand, but Trevor resorts to his dirty fighting techniques and subdues Gao. With Gao pinned against the ropes, Trevor demands a match against the "American Shaolin". Drew rises, but sits down again, refusing to fight Trevor on the principle of non-violence and selflessness. Infuriated, Trevor continues to beat up Gao and hurls him out of the ring. Encouraged by Master San De, Drew finally enters the ring to fight Trevor. Trevor immediately pantsies Drew once again, but Drew prevails and even offers his hand to the defeated Trevor. The crowd voices their support for Shaolin, and Master San De declares that "this is the future of Shaolin".

== Cast ==
- Reese Madigan as Drew Carson
- Trent Bushey as Trevor Gottitall
- Daniel Dae Kim as Gao Yun
- Kim Chan as Master Kwan, Drew's original teacher
- Billy Chang as Li
- Alice Zhang Hung as Ashena
- Cliff Lenderman as D.S. (short for "Drill Sergeant" as he was the head teacher of the newcomers at Shaolin)
- Henry O as Master San De, the Abbot of Shaolin Temple (credited under his birth name of Zhang Zhi Yen)
- Eric Kong as Yaba, a mute Shaolin monk who became Drew's close friend
- Jean Louisa Kelly as Maria
- Andrew Shue as Competitor
- Tokey Hill as Trevor's Coach
- Marcos Antonio Miranda as Coach
- Paul Mormando as Trevor's Sparring Partner

== Production ==
- During the only day of filming within the walls of the Forbidden City, the entire film cast and crew were inexplicably ordered to leave by the government, despite having been granted permission to shoot there. The principal photography on American Shaolin took place from May through late August 1991, two years after the Tiananmen Square protests of 1989, and the filming, particularly within Beijing itself, was under heavy governmental scrutiny.
- In the United States, the film was released on video by Academy Entertainment as American Shaolin: King of the Kickboxers 2. Although both this film and The King of the Kickboxers share the same director, they are completely unrelated in terms of plot and characters. The film has never been released on DVD in the United States.
- The film was the debut performance of Daniel Dae Kim, who at the time was a Taekwondo black belt.
- The DVD is available in Australia.
