= Bruce Lee's Secret =

1977 Hong Kong film by Chan Wa and William Cheung

- Film poster
- Directed by: Chan Wa; William Cheung Ki
- Written by: Chan Wa; Cheung San Yee
- Produced by: Ng Yuk Wan
- Starring: Bruce Li; Carter Wong; Chang Kuei; Hwang Jang Lee; Roy Horan; Robert Kerver; Gary Hester; Alan Ellerton; Charles Bonet; Phil Cohen; Greg Talovic; Dan Schwarz
- Cinematography: William Cheung Ki
- Edited by: Chen Hung-min; Poon Hung
- Music by: Stanley Chow Fook Leung
- Distributed by: Golden Sun Films
- Release date: 1977
- Running time: 91 minutes
- Country: Hong Kong
- Language: Cantonese

Bruce Lee's Secret is a 1977 Hong Kong martial arts action film directed by Chan Wa and William Cheung Ki, which is also a pseudo biopic of Bruce Lee. It stars Bruce Li (not to be confused with Lee) as "Bob" Lee, whose life is essentially the same as Lee's and is on two occasions actually referred to as "Bruce". The film has also been released under three other English titles: The Story of the Dragon, Bruce Lee's Deadly Kung Fu and Bruce Lee: Master of Jeet Kune Do. The film was released on DVD by Goodtimes Entertainment in 2001 under the name Bruce Lee: A Dragon's Story.

== Synopsis ==
In San Francisco, Bruce "Bob" Lee works in a Chinese food restaurant with his wacky friend Chang Ming. When a gang of hoodlums is making trouble, Bob puts a lot of pepper on their chicken, making them sneeze a lot (and inspiring the line, "This is pepper chicken. Good for gut's ache!").

Unfortunately, Bob and Chang are blacklisted from the bustling San Francisco Chinese restaurant community by the gang. They accidentally land a job at a shipyard after narrowly averting being run over by the owner's daughter's car. She tells them to get back to work, assuming they already work there unloading speaker cabinet boxes. The shipyard is attacked by members of the boxing gang that Bob beat up in the beginning of the film. At first, Bob and Chang refuse to fight to prevent losing their jobs again. However, they are called chickens by the shipyard owners, and after finally beating up some bad guys, people realize what an amazing martial artist Bob is, and encourage him to start his own kung fu school.

Bob's school opens to boffo business, but there is controversy among the powerful rival kung fu schools because Bob is teaching to non-Asians. He also creates Jeet Kune Do, and uses his newly improves martial arts ability to whup the baddies once and for all.

== Cast ==
- Bruce Li as Bruce "Bob" Lee
- Carter Wong as Mr. Liu Cousin
- Chang Kuei as Chang Ming
- Hwang Jang Lee as Jin Yong Ji
- Roy Horan as Thug
- Robert Kerver as Thug
- Gary Hester as Thug
- Allan Ellerton as Thug
- Charles Bonet as Thug
- Phil Cohen as Thug
- Greg Tavolic as Thug
- Dan Schwarz as Mr. Grace

== Production ==
Filming started in late 1975 and finished early 1976. The film was made in Taipei and nearby areas. The restaurant scene at the start is in Bo-Ai street, Taipei. The bungalows are in a former US military housing complex near Taipei. The docks scenes are at Keelung. Some scenes were shot in the suburb of Beitou.

== Reaction ==
The film was poorly received by critics. Despite the negative reaction to this film, actor Hwang Jang Lee would later achieve stardom after appearing as the bad guy in Jackie Chan's breakout films, Snake in the Eagle's Shadow and Drunken Master.

== See also ==
- List of Hong Kong films
