= Million Dollars Snatch =

1976 Hong Kong film by Ng See-yuen

- Film poster
- Traditional Chinese: 七百萬元大劫案
- Hanyu Pinyin: Qi bai wan yuan da jie an
- Directed by: Ng See-yuen
- Written by: Ng See-yuen; Lu Tung
- Produced by: Liu Sing-kwong
- Cinematography: Lan Wang-shing
- Edited by: Sung Ming; Poon Hung
- Music by: Stanley Chow
- Production company: Tak Lee Moving Picture Co.
- Release date: 14 August 1976; (Hong Kong)
- Running time: 87 minutes
- Country: Hong Kong
- Language: Cantonese
- Box office: HK$1,515,564

Million Dollars Snatch (七百萬元大劫案, Qi bai wan yuan da jie an, lit. "Seven Million Dollar Robbery") also known as Kung Fu Sting, is a 1976 Hong Kong crime thriller neo-noir film directed by Ng See-yuen.

== Plot ==
Chan Ah-sang, a career criminal, engineers a bank robbery to be carried out by a gang of seven recruited hoodlums, all led by Chan. The robbery goes off without a hitch, and Chan's gang make off with seven million dollars. A special police unit is then formed to investigate the case, with the chief inspector suspecting Chan and beginning to keep him under surveillance. In order to stay undetected, each member is specifically ordered to not spend their share of the one million HK$ from the heist for six months, as to not attract suspicion from the police, which proves to be too much of a temptation for the rest of the gang, causing the police to track them down, arrest all the criminals, and return the stolen money to the bank.

== Cast ==
- Chang Kung as Inspector Lee
- Lin Wen-Wei as Robber Chan Ah-sang
- Hoh Gong-Lun as Robber Kwok Cheung
- Lau Hok-Nin as Biker robber
- John Cheung Ng-Long as Robber Tang Lik
- Tam Wing-Git as Robber Lou Zai
- Chan Hung-Gaai as Robber Yik Yat-Hoi
- Addy Sung Gam-Loi as Robber Tai Sai-Ciu
- Lee Hoi-Sang as Detective
- Mak Wa-Mei as Chan's girlfriend
- Na Na as Lou's girlfriend
- Fung Ging-Man as Dai's neighbour
- Lau Kwok-Shing as Robber Saa Daam-Seng
- Wong Kwok-Leung as Luk Zai

== Production and Release ==
Million Dollars Snatch was loosely based on the real life robbery of HK$75 million from an armored car for the Hang Seng Bank in 1975, roughly equivalent to USD $10,000,000 at the time.

The film was produced by the Dak Lee Moving Picture Company, with Ng See-yuen acting as a director for hire shortly after the formation of his company, Seasonal Film Corporation in 1975. In Hong Kong, the film was a modest box office success, and was a major inspiration for other sensational crime films released by Hong Kong studios in the 1970s. It released theatrically in America under the title Kung Fu Sting. The film has never been released on home video in America.

== See also ==
- Hong Kong Action Cinema
