= L.A. Wars =

1994 American action film

- Promotional release poster
- Directed by: Tony Kandah; Martin Morris
- Screenplay by: Addison Randall; Tony Kandah
- Starring: Vince Murdocco; Mary E. Zilba; A. J. Stephans; Johnny Venokur; Rodrigo Obregón; David Jean Thomas; Kerri Kasem; Sam Sabbagh
- Release date: 1994
- Running time: 94 minutes
- Country: United States
- Language: English

L.A. Wars is a 1994 American action film directed by Tony Kandah and Martin Morris. It stars Vince Murdocco as a disgraced former officer of the Los Angeles Police Department who becomes involved in a conflict between two rival crime syndicates.

== Cast ==
- Vince Murdocco as Jaquinn
- Mary E. Zilba as Carla Giovani
- A. J. Stephans as Carlo Giovani
- Johnny Venokur as Vinnie Scoletti
- Rodrigo Obregón as Raul Guzman
- David Jean Thomas as Capt. Roark
- Kerri Kasem as Rosa
- Sam Sabbagh as Vick

== Reception ==
A reviewer for the New York Daily News gave the film a score of two stars, noting that the "invincible heroics" of Murdocco's character "grow irritating", but commending the performances of Obregón and Venokur.

Brian Orndorf, in a retrospective review of the film for Blu-ray.com, wrote that it "[finds] success when it stops trying to be anything more than a VHS-ready bruiser that loves to shoot up characters and burn everything else to the ground."

== Home media ==
L.A. Wars first received a home video release in June 1994. In May 2020, the film was released on Blu-ray and DVD by Vinegar Syndrome.
