= Secret Rivals 2 =

1977 Hong Kong film by Ng See-yuen

- Film poster
- Directed by: Ng See-yuen
- Written by: Ng See-yuen; Lu Tung
- Produced by: Ng See-yuen
- Starring: Hwang Jang Lee; John Liu; Tino Wong; Corey Yuen; Hsu Hsia
- Cinematography: Chang Chi
- Edited by: Poon Hung
- Music by: Stanley Chow
- Production company: Seasonal Film Corporation
- Release date: 20 April 1977
- Running time: 95 minutes
- Country: Hong Kong
- Language: Mandarin

Secret Rivals 2 (Chinese: 南拳北腿鬥金狐), a.k.a. Silver Fox Rivals II, is a 1977 Hong Kong martial arts-action film directed by Ng See-yuen and starring Hwang Jang Lee, John Liu and Tino Wong.

== Plot ==
The film picks up almost exactly where the original Secret Rivals ended, namely with the death of the dreaded Silver Fox. Mourning the death of Silver Fox is his brother, Gold Fox (again played by Hwang Jang Lee), who vows revenge against Northern Leg and Southern Fist. But Gold Fox is unable to find Southern Fist and must instead fight his brother (Tino Wong), who is saved in the nick of time by Northern Leg. After escaping, the two once again need to combine to defeat their dreaded enemy. But Gold Fox has taken precautions—he's brought backup: four expert kickers and four expert boxers.

== Cast ==
- Hwang Jang Lee – Chin Hu / "Gold Fox"
- John Liu – Northern Leg Hsiao Yi Fei
- Tino Wong – Southern Fist Jr. Shen Ying Wu
- Corey Yuen – Yen Kwai (as Yuen Kwai)
- Hsu Hsia - Tang Lang
- Sham Chim Bo - Ying Yang
- Phillip Ko
- Blackie Ko
- Yuen Biao - Thug
- Yuen Wah - extra
- Yuen Woo Ping - extra
- Lu Feng - extra
