= Two Fists Against the Law =

1980 Hong Kong film by Chan Chuen

- Promotional image
- 雙辣
- Directed by: Chan Chuen
- Produced by: Ng See-Yuen
- Starring: Alan Chui Chung-San; Hwang Jang-lee; Melvin Wong
- Cinematography: Wang Yung-Lung
- Edited by: Poon Hung
- Music by: Frankie Chan
- Distributed by: Seasonal Film Corporation
- Release date: 5 November 1980
- Running time: 85 minutes
- Country: Hong Kong
- Languages: Cantonese; Mandarin

Two Fists Against the Law is a 1980 martial arts film, directed by Chan Chuen, produced by Ng See-yuen and starring Alan Chui Chung-San and Hwang Jang-lee. The film is also known as Twin Bitter.

== Plot ==
Lee Yong and Fang Erh, known as extremely cunning men in the town decide to rob Master Tai (Hwang Jang Lee) with his new consignment, since it has been rumored to be worth seven million. Meanwhile, local police captain (Melvin Wong) tries to change their ways. Eventually they discover that Master Tai has been trading opium. Lee Yong and Fang Erh help the local policeman to fight against the Master Tai for justice.

== Cast ==
- Alan Chui Chung-San - Fang Erh
- Hwang Jang-lee - Master Tai
- Melvin Wong - Captain Chiang
- Chik Ngai Hung - Lee Yong
- Chiang Kam - Fatty Scammed by Fang Erh
- Chung Fat - Debt Collector Double Knives (Cameo)
- To Siu Ming - Captain Chiang's sidekick
- Pau Yung Sheng - Captain Chiang's sidekick
- Chan Dik Hak - Master Tai's son
- Chan Chuen - Fatty's Servant (Cameo)
- Chui Fat - Forest Fighter fighting Fang Erh
- Yeung Sai Gwan - Forest Fighter fighting Fang Erh
- Cheng Chok Chow
- Lee Fat Yuen
- Chan Siu-Kai
- Mang Hoi - extra (Stunts)

== Reception ==
The film has mixed reviews. Rarekungfumovies.com give it 3 stars out of 5.

== Home media ==
The movie was released on VHS with an English dubbed version and a VCD version with Cantonese and Mandarin duo audio version. In 1990, they released a VCD version with original Cantonese dubbed version as well.
