= Me and Will =

1999 film

- Directed by: Melissa Behr; Sherrie Rose
- Screenplay by: Melissa Behr; Sherrie Rose
- Produced by: Melissa Behr; Pierre David; Joey Forsyte; Jason Hall; Gary Kohn; Vesco Razpopov; Sherrie Rose
- Starring: Sherrie Rose; Melissa Behr; Patrick Dempsey; Seymour Cassell; Grace Zabriskie; M. Emmet Walsh; Billy Wirth
- Cinematography: Joey Forsyte
- Edited by: Eric L. Beason; Debra Goldfield; Ross Guidici
- Music by: Shark
- Production companies: S&M Productions
- Distributed by: Bedford Entertainment; MTI Home Video; Peace Arch Entertainment Group
- Release date: October 19, 1999
- Running time: 101 minutes
- Country: United States
- Language: English

Me and Will is a 1999 road drama film written, starring and directed by Melissa Behr and Sherrie Rose. Additional casting includes Patrick Dempsey, Seymour Cassel, Grace Zabriskie, M. Emmet Walsh, Billy Wirth, Johnny Whitworth, John Enos III, and Julie McCullough.

It was produced by Melissa Behr, Sherrie Rose, Pierre David, Joey Forsyte, Jason Hall, Gary Kohn, and Vesco Razpopov. The film's score was composed by Wild Colonials guitarist, Shark with Additional Music by Matt Sorum & Thomas Morse.

The movie's tagline is Nobody rides for free. In the film, two women (Rose and Behr) meet while going to rehab. They discover that they've both longed to ride Captain America's red, white, and blue motorcycle from Easy Rider (1969) and they escape the rehab clinic and go on the highway in search of their dream bike.

== Plot ==
Jane and Will are familiar faces in the Los Angeles club scene who meet at a drug rehab after Will smashes her motorcycle while stoned and Jane has overdosed. They connect easily, and after one of them claims to know where they can find the red, white, and blue bike from Easy Rider they hatch a plan to escape the clinic and take the long ride to Montana on their own bikes in search of the legend.

== Cast ==
- Sherrie Rose as Jane
- Melissa Behr as Will
- Patrick Dempsey as Eddie "Fast Eddie"
- Seymour Cassell as Roy
- Grace Zabriskie as Edith
- M. Emmet Walsh as Dean
- Billy Wirth as Charlie
- Johnny Whitworth as Fred
- John Enos III as Jack
- Julie McCullough as Stacey
- Michael Bowen as George
- Steve Railsback as Rob
- Bojesse Christopher as Joseph
- Chuck Zito as Biker

== Filming Location ==
The film was shot in Los Angeles, California.
