= All for the Winner =

1990 Hong Kong film by Jeffrey Lau and Corey Yuen

- Theatrical poster
- Directed by: Jeffrey Lau; Corey Yuen
- Screenplay by: Jeffrey Lau
- Story by: Jeffrey Lau; Ng See-Yuen; Corey Yuen
- Produced by: Jeffrey Lau; Corey Yuen
- Starring: Stephen Chow; Ng Man-tat; Sharla Cheung; Sandra Ng; Paul Chun; Corey Yuen; Jeffrey Lau
- Cinematography: Jimmy Leung; Chan Yuen-kai
- Edited by: Poon Hung
- Music by: Lowell Lo
- Production companies: Golden Harvest Productions; Seasonal Film Corporation; Wellstreet Productions
- Distributed by: Golden Harvest
- Release date: 18 August 1990
- Running time: 101 minutes
- Country: Hong Kong
- Languages: Cantonese; Mandarin
- Box office: HK$41,326,156

All for the Winner (Chinese: 賭聖; lit. 'Saint of Gambling') is a 1990 Hong Kong comedy film, directed by Jeffrey Lau and Corey Yuen, and starring Stephen Chow. It was the first movie ever in Hong Kong to cross the HK$40 million (HK$41,326,156.00) mark in the Hong Kong box office. It was a parody of God of Gamblers (1989), and due to its success it spawned a sequel, God of Gamblers II (1990), which featured characters from the original God of Gamblers.

== Plot ==
Sing (Stephen Chow) is a mainland China country boy who arrives in Hong Kong to visit his Uncle "Blackie Tat" (Ng Man-tat). When Sing stays with his uncle and his friends in their apartment, Blackie soon learns of Sing's supernatural ability to see through objects and, later on, his ability to change playing cards by rubbing them. He takes advantage of this and turns Sing into the Dou Seng or the "Saint of Gamblers". After getting into a fight with several alleyway gamblers he meets the lovely Yee-mung a.k.a. "Lady Dream" (lit. trans: Beautiful Dream, but euphemistically as wet dream), a henchman for the "King of Gamblers", and becomes infatuated with her. Sing quickly becomes a rival to the King and must win his way through a world competition to prove his skill.

== Cast ==
- Stephen Chow as (左頌星) Sing "Saint of Gamblers"
- Ng Man-tat as (黑仔達) Blackie Tat
- Sharla Cheung as (綺夢) Yee-mung "Lady Dream"
- Sandra Ng as (阿萍) Ping
- Paul Chun as (洪光) Mr. Hung "King of Gamblers"
- Corey Yuen as (賣魚盛) Fishy Shing
- Jeffrey Lau as (陳松) Chung Chan
- Wan Yeung-ming as Billy
- Sheila Chan as (阿英) Ying
- Chin Tsi-ang
- Angelina Lo as (六姑) Luk
- Chik King-man
- Cheung Ka-sang
- Liu Huang-hsi

== Box office ==
The film grossed HK$41,326,156 at the Hong Kong box office during its theatrical run from 18 August to 19 September 1990.

== Award nominations ==
Year	Award	Category	Recipient	Result
1991	10th Hong Kong Film Awards	Best Actor	Stephen Chow	Nominated
1991	10th Hong Kong Film Awards	Best Supporting Actor	Ng Man-tat	Nominated
