= Snuff Bottle Connection =

1977 Hong Kong film by Dung Gam-woo and Lau Lap-lap

- Directed by: Dung Gam-woo; Lau Lap-lap
- Written by: Tue Liang-tee
- Produced by: Johnny Lee Man-yiu
- Starring: Hwang Jang-lee; John Liu; Roy Horan
- Cinematography: Lin Wen-chin
- Edited by: Poon Hung-yiu
- Music by: Chow Lan-ping
- Distributed by: Fortuna Film Company
- Release date: 15 September 1977
- Running time: 91 minutes
- Country: Taiwan
- Language: Mandarin
- Box office: HK $1,012,351.20

Snuff Bottle Connection (Chinese: 神腿鐵扇功) is a 1977 martial arts film produced by Taiwanese company Fortuna Film Company and directed by Dung Gam-woo and Lau Lap-lap. The film stars Hwang Jang-lee and John Liu. The film was released in the Hong Kong on 15 September 1977.

== Plot ==
In the late Qing dynasty of China (The Qing dynasty followed the Ming dynasty. Their reign started as the Ming reign ended in 1644 and terminated in 1912.), the Russians are consorting with traitorous Manchus, who plan to turn over a map of the strategic points the Russians could use to invade Chinese territories. So, with the hope that he can sniff out their plan and the traitors (and not get killed like their first spy), the government sends out Chow Tien to investigate and spy on the visiting Russian General, Tolstoy, and his lackeys. Since Tolstoy is a pistol expert, Tien gets his brother Ko, who is a dagger expert, and his tag along kid to help aide him. Soon the plot reveals a traitorous magistrate and the key figure behind it all, but the method by which the Manchu's identify themselves to the Russians, a rare snuff bottle, is stolen by Tien and his cohorts. But, Tein and crew are in the midst of enemies and must fight their way out alone in a desperate bid to save China and bring the traitors down.

== Cast ==
- Hwang Jang-lee – General Shan Tung
- John Liu – Chow Tien
- Yip Fei-yang - Ko
- Wong Yat-lung - Xiao Do Sze
- Roy Horan - Tolstoy
- Hsu Hsia - Tao Kwan (Shan Tung's Student)
- Yuen Shun-yi - Chi Nao
- Philip Ko - Corrupt Magistrate
- Chang Chi Ping - Kwok Lo
- Tsai Fu Kwei - Waiter (Cameo)
- Yuan Bao Huang - Official (Cameo)
- Wong Ka Ka - Wong's Daughter
- Robert Kerver - Russian Bodyguard
- Phil Cohen - Russian Bodyguard
- Yuen Biao - Restaurant Fighter/Ambusher
- Corey Yuen - Patriot in Disguise as Shan Tung's Soldier
- Peng Kang - Shan Tung's Soldier
- Wong Chi Sang - Shan Tung's Soldier
- Chin Yuet Sang - Shang Tung's Soldier

== See also ==
- Hwang Jang-lee filmography
- List of Hong Kong films
