= Cracking Up (1994 film) =

- Directed by: Matt Mitler
- Written by: Matt Mitler; Theodore P. LoRusso
- Story by: Matt Mitler
- Produced by: Matt Mitler
- Starring: Matt Mitler; Carolyn McDermott; Debra Wilson
- Cinematography: Mark Traver
- Edited by: Matt Mitler
- Music by: Arthur Rosen
- Production company: Foolish Mortal Films
- Distributed by: Phaedra Cinema
- Release date: September 1994 (Venice)
- Running time: 92 minutes
- Country: United States
- Language: English

Cracking Up is a 1994 American comedy-drama film directed by Matt Mitler and starring Mitler, Carolyn McDermott and Debra Wilson.

== Cast ==
- Matt Mitler as Danny Gold
- Carolyn McDermott as Carolyn
- Jason Brill as Jake Weinberg
- Kimberly Flynn as Kimberly
- Chuck Montgomery as Lucky Jackson
- Debra Wilson as Alliandre Burrell
- David Wells as Alan
- Kevin Brown as Dack
- Debra K. Lynn as Hazel
