= Ng See-yuen =

Hong Kong filmmaker and businessman (born 1944)

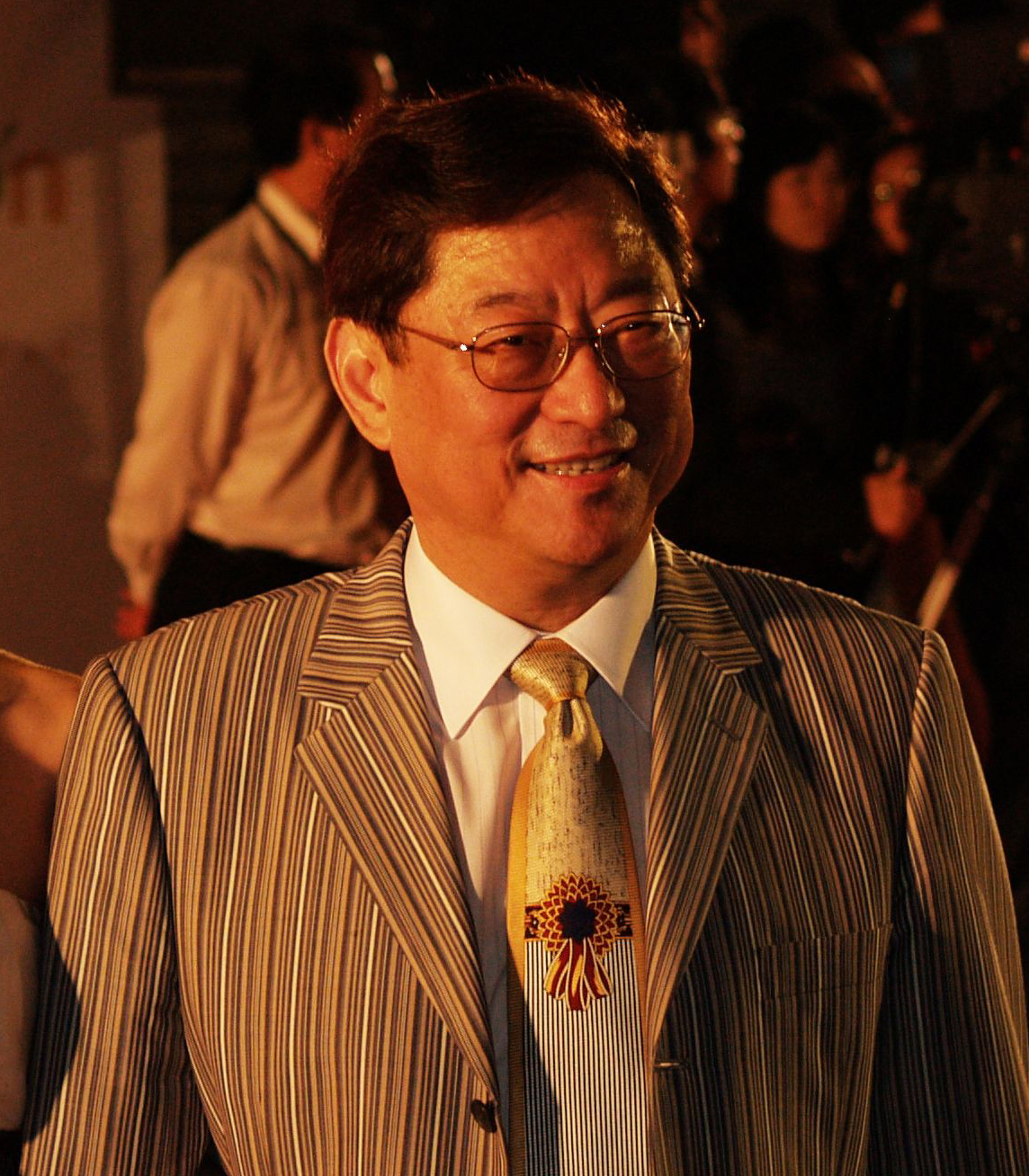
- Ng in 2007
- Born: 6 June 1944 (age 82); Shanghai, Republic of China
- Occupations: Film producer; director; writer; businessman
- Years active: 1970–present

Chinese name
- Traditional Chinese: 吳思遠
- Simplified Chinese: 吴思远
Transcriptions
Standard Mandarin
- Hanyu Pinyin: Wú Sīyuǎn
Yue: Cantonese
- Jyutping: Ng4 See1-yuen5

Ng See-yuen (Chinese: 吳思遠; born 6 June 1944) is a Hong Kong film producer, director, screenwriter and businessman.

He has been active in the Hong Kong film industry since 1970, particularly in action films. He was one of the first filmmakers to find widespread success outside of the major studios of Shaw Brothers and Golden Harvest as the founder of Seasonal Film Corporation, where he helped launch the careers of Jackie Chan, Jimmy Wang Yu, Corey Yuen, Jean-Claude Van Damme, Hiroyuki Sanada, Jet Li and Wu Jing. He has been twice nominated for the Hong Kong Film Award for Best Film, for The Unwritten Law (1985) and The Soong Sisters (1997).

Ng is an Honorary President of the Hong Kong Film Directors' Guild, a former President of the Federation of Hong Kong Filmmakers, and was President of the Hong Kong Film Awards Association from 1995 to 2000. He is also a co-founder of the UME Huaxing International Cinema chain, and the owner of the Hong Kong A1 Division basketball club Seasonal.

== Early life ==
Ng See-yuen was born in Shanghai, during Japanese occupation, on June 6, 1944. He and his family moved to British Hong Kong in 1961, where he attended New Method College in Kowloon. He worked as a security guard and a secondary school teacher before entering the film industry.

== History ==
=== Filmmaking ===
His career in the industry began as an executive at Shaw Brothers Studio. The first film he was involved in was The Chinese Boxer (1970), on which he worked as assistant director to film director Jimmy Wang Yu. He then produced the film The Bloody Fists in 1972 which was sold to and distributed by what was then Hong Kong's third largest movie conglomerate Goldig Films, owned by Alex Gouw.In 1975, he founded Seasonal Film Corporation. The first film produced by the company was Secret Rivals in 1976, which Ng also directed.

Ng produced and co-wrote Snake in the Eagle's Shadow (1978) and Drunken Master, which were the first films directed by Yuen Woo-ping and were Jackie Chan's first real successes at the domestic box office.

In 1985, Ng was the first Hong Kong producer to make a film in the USA that successfully showed the Hong Kong style of action when he worked with Corey Yuen on No Retreat, No Surrender, which starred then unknowns Kurt McKinney and Jean-Claude Van Damme.

Other notable films that Ng See-yuen worked on include Ninja in the Dragon's Den (as co-writer and producer) and Legend of a Fighter (as producer and writer), both in 1982. He also co-produced Jackie Chan's 1992 film Twin Dragons, and four of the Once Upon a Time in China series.

Still working in the industry, he produced Alfred Cheung's romantic comedy Contract Lover in 2007, and is credited as presenter for the 2008 film Legendary Assassin.

=== Other industry roles ===
Ng See-yuen is an Honorary Advisor and jury member for the Asian Film Awards. He holds several additional titles including Chairman of the Federation of Hong Kong Filmmakers, Honorary Permanent President of the Hong Kong Film Directors' Guild, and Advisor of the Hong Kong International Film Festival. In April 2007, he became an official member of the Hong Kong Film Development Council. In this capacity, he has been a vocal advocate for the introduction of a motion picture rating system in China and has spoken out on issues such as Mainland China's policies toward the co-production of films with other nations and censorship.

Ng is also the founder of "UME International Cineplex," one of the largest cinema chains in China, with five-star cineplexes in Guangzhou, Shanghai, Chongqing, Hangzhou and an IMAX cineplex in Beijing. "UME" is an acronym for Ultimate Movie Experience.

== Filmography ==
=== As director ===
- Feng kuang sha shou (1971)
- The Bloody Fists (1972); also writer, sold to and distributed by then Hong Kong's third largest movie conglomerate Goldig Films, owned by Alex Gouw
- Kung Fu, the Invisible Fist (1972); also writer
- Meng hu xia shan (1973)
- Call Me Dragon (1974); also producer and writer
- The Godfather Squad (1974); also writer
- Little Superman (1975); also writer
- Shi san hao xiong zhai (1975)
- Anti-Corruption (1975); also writer
- Secret Rivals (1976)
- Million Dollars Snatch (1976); also writer
- Bruce Lee: The Man, The Myth (1976); also writer
- Kidnap in Rome (1976); also producer
- Secret Rivals 2 (1977); also producer and co-writer
- The Invincible Armour (1977)
- What Price Stardom? (1977); also producer
- The Ring of Death (1980); also producer and writer
- Game of Death II (1980); also producer
- Tiger and Crane Shaolin Kung Fu (1982)
- The Unwritten Law (1985); also producer and writer
- The Music Box (2006); (uncredited)
- Evening of Roses (2009); also producer

=== As writer ===
- Snake in the Eagle's Shadow (1978); also producer
- Drunken Master (1978); also producer
- Dance of the Drunk Mantis (1979); also producer
- The Sweet and Sour Cops (1981); also producer
- Legend of a Fighter (1982); also producer
- Ninja in the Dragon's Den (1982); also producer
- Hao cai zhuang dao ni (1984); also producer
- No Retreat, No Surrender (1986); also producer
- All for the Winner (1990); also producer
- The King of the Kickboxers (1990); also producer

=== As producer ===
- Hong lou chun shang chun (1978)
- Snake in the Eagle's Shadow (1978); also writer
- Drunken Master (1978); also writer
- Dance of the Drunk Mantis (1979); also writer
- The Butterfly Murders (1979)
- She mao he hun xing quan (1980)
- We're Going to Eat You (1980)
- Ta Bei wu ai (1980)
- Two Fists Against the Law (1980)
- The Sweet and Sour Cops (1981); also writer
- Legend of a Fighter (1982); also writer
- Ninja in the Dragon's Den (1982); also writer
- The Sweet and Sour Cops Part II (1982)
- Hao cai zhuang dao ni (1984); also writer
- No Retreat, No Surrender (1986); also writer
- Hun wai qing (1988)
- Walk on Fire (1988)
- All for the Winner (1990); also writer
- The King of the Kickboxers (1990); also writer
- Twin Dragons (1992)
- Once Upon a Time in China II (1992)
- Once Upon a Time in China III (1993)
- Once Upon a Time in China IV (1993)
- Once Upon a Time in China V (1994)
- Ren yue huang hun (1995)
- The Soong Sisters (1997)
