= Anti-Corruption (film) =

1975 Hong Kong film by Ng See-yuen

- Film poster
- Directed by: Ng See Yuen
- Written by: Ng See Yuen
- Produced by: Pau Ming
- Starring: Bill Lake; Ling Hon; Sonu Kumar
- Cinematography: William Chang Kee
- Edited by: Poon Hung; Sung Ming
- Music by: Stanley Chow
- Production companies: Seasonal Film Corporation; Eternal Film
- Distributed by: Eternal Film
- Release date: 21 August 1975
- Running time: 90 minutes
- Country: Hong Kong
- Language: Mandarin Chinese

Anti-Corruption (simplified Chinese: 廉政风波; traditional Chinese: 廉政風暴; pinyin: Lian zheng feng bo; lit. 'Storm of Integrity') is a 1975 film written and directed by Ng See Yuen. It was the first film produced by Ng's company Seasonal Film Corporation. Anti-Corruption was co-produced by Eternal Film.

The film shows the incidents that precipitated the creation of the Independent Commission Against Corruption in 1974. Anti-Corruption is a crime thriller that depicts police corruption and was based on an inquiry into the activities of the drug lord Wu Xihao between 1973 and 1974. It was a low-budget film that did well at the box office. On 12 October 1979, the scholar Bo Yang penned a 4,000-word essay about the film in the China Times. Anti-Corruption's success led to many more Hong Kong films about police and criminals to be made.

== Cast ==
- Bill Lake
- Ling Hon
- Sonu Kumar

== See also ==
- 1975 in film
- List of Hong Kong films of 1975
- Cinema of Hong Kong
