= Sherrie Rose =

American actress

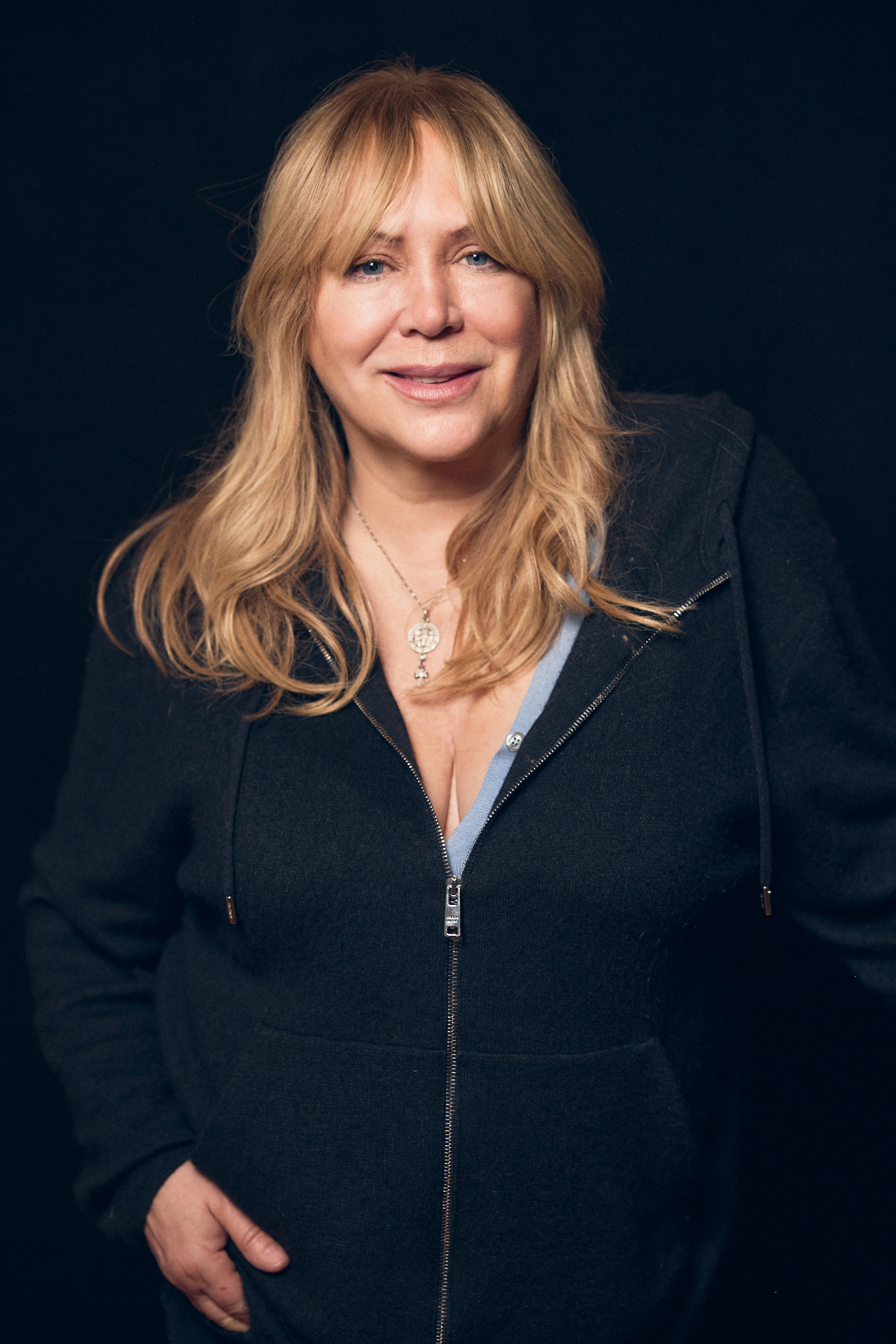
- Born: Connecticut, U.S.
- Occupations: Actress; producer; director; screenwriter
- Years active: 1988–present
- Children: 1

Sherrie Rose is an American actress, producer, director, and screenwriter. She co-produced, directed, wrote and starred in the 1999 road drama Me and Will, starring Patrick Dempsey. The film opened the Women in Film Series for Sundance and appeared in many film festivals.

== Early years ==
Rose is the daughter of Ed and Kathy Rose. She was born in Connecticut, and the family moved to Tampa when she was in her teens. She graduated from George D. Chamberlain High School in Tampa and began majoring in electrical engineering at the University of South Florida (USF). While she worked with the sound system in a theater at USF, she decided to audition for a play, and she was successful. She made the dean's list three years during her engineering studies in addition to performing in productions at the university and community theaters. She worked as a model, including posing for pictures in swimwear magazines and for nude images in Playboy magazine.

== Career ==
Rose has also appeared in over 65 films including Killer Crocodile (1989), No Retreat, No Surrender 3: Blood Brothers (1990), The King of the Kickboxers (1990), Maximum Force (1992), Unlawful Entry (1992), New Crime City (1994), Demon Knight (1995) and Black Scorpion II (1997), and television shows including Miami Vice, Married... with Children, Charmed, and Sons of Anarchy, two "Tales from the Crypt" episodes and the books entitled Tales from the Crypt and Girlfriends.

== Personal life ==
Rose and Jeffrey Dean Morgan have a child, born circa 2004–2005.

== Filmography ==
=== Film ===
Year	Title	Role	Notes
1988	After School	First Tribe	
1989	Summer Job	Kathy	
1989	Brothers in War	Mary	
1989	Killer Crocodile	Pamela	
1989	Cat Chaser	Waitress	uncredited cameo
1989	Lauderdale	Vinyal Vixen #1	cameo
1989	The Victims	Elizabeth	
1989	Cy Warrior	Susan	
1990	In Gold We Trust	Debbie	
1990	No Retreat, No Surrender 3: Blood Brothers	Jodie	
1990	American risciò	Mary Jo	
1990	The King of the Kickboxers	Molly	
1991	A Climate for Killing	Rita Paris	
1991	Martial Law 2: Undercover	Bree	
1992	Deadly Bet	Doris	
1992	Final Judgement	Amanda	
1992	Body Waves	Suzanne	
1992	Unlawful Entry	Girl In Jeep	cameo
1992	Maximum Force	Cody Randal	
1992	Double Threat	Lisa Shane	
1994	New Crime City	Darla	
1995	Demon Knight	Wanda	
1995	Writer's Block	Tiffany	
1995	Guns and Lipstick	Mary Harris	
1996	Hollywood: The Movie	Bridget	
1996	The Shot	Unknown Role	cameo and producer
1997	Black Scorpion II	Professor Ursula Undershaft / Aftershock	
1997	The Nurse	Brooke Martin	
1997	Firestorm	Dancer / Lead	
1998	Devil in the Flesh	Marilyn	
1999	Out in Fifty	Unknown Role	cameo and producer
1999	Me and Will	Jane	
2000	The Perfect Nanny	Rosalee	
2001	Play Dead	Darlene Murphy	
2001	Final Payback	Tanya	
2001	Without Charlie	Spam	cameo
2003	This Girl's Life	Doctor	
2004	L.A. D.J.	Hot Nurse	cameo
2012	Night Claws	Deputy Roberta Glickman	
2015	Relentless Justice	Cinzia Monreale	
2017	The Bang Bang Brokers	Susan Rossi	

=== Television ===
Year	Title	Role	Notes
1989	Miami Vice	Jenny	Episode: "Miami Squeeze"
1990	Married... with Children	Mandi	Episode: "Do Ya Think I'm Sexy"
1990	The Flash	Young Belle	Episode: "Ghost in the Machine"
1990	1st & Ten	Hildegarde	Episode: "If I Didn't Play Football"
1990	Full House	Darlene	Episode: "Happy New Year"
1991	Good Sports	Unknown Role	Episode: "Pros and Ex-Cons"
1992	Baby Talk	Unknown Role	Episode: "He Ain't Heavy Metal, He's My Super"
1992	Jake and the Fatman	Jill Ross	Episode: "Nightmare"
1992	Dark Justice	Ronnie Sturgis	Episode: "Lead Rain"
1992	Dream On	Tasha	Episode: "Terms of Employment"
1993	Crime & Punishment	Franny	Episode: "Our Denial"
1993	Bakersfield P.D.	Kimberly	Episode: "Bakersfield Madam"
1994	The Good Life	April	Episode: "Calendar Girl"
1992-1994	Tales from the Crypt	Molly / Vendetta	Guest role; 2 episodes
1995	Marker	Connie	Episode: "High & Wild"
1995	Vanishing Son	Dana Micelli	Episode: "Jersey Girl"
1996	Red Shoe Diaries	Laurie	Episode: "The Boxer"
1997	Mike Hammer, Private Eye	"Blue Eyes"	Episode: "Prodigal Son"
1998	Charmed	Susan Trudeau	Episode: "Dead Man Dating"
2001	Black Scorpion	Professor Ursula Undershaft / Aftershock	Recurring role; 3 episodes
2003	The Handler	Darla	Episode: "Homewrecker's Ball"
2008	Sons of Anarchy	Emily Duncan	Episode: "Seeds"
