= The Butterfly Murders =

1979 Hong Kong film by Tsui Hark

- Film poster

Chinese name
- Traditional Chinese: 蝶變
- Simplified Chinese: 蝶变
- Literal meaning: Metamorphosis
Transcriptions
Standard Mandarin
- Hanyu Pinyin: Dié biàn
Yue: Cantonese
- Jyutping: Dip^{6} bin^{3}
- Directed by: Tsui Hark
- Written by: Lam Chi-ming; Lam Fan
- Produced by: Ng See-yuen
- Starring: Lau Siu-ming; Michelle Yim; Chang Kuo-chu
- Cinematography: Fan Gam-yuk
- Edited by: David Wu; Huang Chih-hsiung
- Music by: Joseph Koo; Frankie Chan
- Production company: Seasonal Film Corporation
- Distributed by: Seasonal Film Corporation
- Release date: 20 July 1979
- Running time: 88 minutes
- Country: Hong Kong
- Language: Cantonese

The Butterfly Murders (Chinese: 蝶變; lit. 'Metamorphosis') is a 1979 Hong Kong wuxia film directed by Tsui Hark, in his feature directorial debut. It stars Lau Siu-ming, Michelle Yim, and Chang Kuo-chu. The film is known for incorporating elements of murder mystery and gothic horror into the wuxia genre, and is considered an early work of the Hong Kong New Wave film movement.

== Plot ==
The film is narrated from the point of view of Fang Hongye, a scholar who studies peculiar events in the jianghu and records them in his "Hongye's Notebook". In the notebook, he writes about a mysterious "Butterfly Murders" case at the Shen Family Fort. The death of the fort's old master, who was involved in a tomb robbery, was connected to butterflies. Over ten years later, another tomb robber dies in a similar manner, prompting Shen Qing, the fort's current master, to invite Fang Hongye, Tian Feng and Qingyingzi to investigate. Their arrival triggers more butterfly-related murders and the situation escalates when Shen Qing himself also becomes a victim. Shen Qing's wife insists on waiting for another group of three from the "Thunder Quartet" to show up before taking further action.

One day, Azhi, a mute servant at the fort, leads Fang Hongye to a secret gunpowder storage room, raising suspicions. When the "Thunder Quartet" trio arrive, Shen Qing's wife is killed by an iron-clad figure. As Fang Hongye and Qingyingzi investigate further, they realise that the iron-clad figure is Shen Qing, whose true identity is Yu Zhen, the apparently deceased fourth member of the "Thunder Quartet".

Six years ago, Yu Zhen had established the Shen Family Fort to secretly develop an alloy for the gun barrel of a powerful weapon. Once his mission was completed, Yu Zhen, in his ambition to dominate the jianghu, orchestrated the "Butterfly Murders" to eliminate his rivals and manipulate Tian Feng into assisting him unwittingly. After Fang Hongye solves the mystery, he leaves the fort, where Yu Zhen, Tian Feng and the others perish together in a final battle which destroys the fort and the weapon.

== Cast ==
- Lau Siu-ming as Fang Hongye
- Michelle Yim as Qingyingzi (Green Shadow)
- Chang Kuo-chu as Shen Qing
- Jojo Chan as Madame Shen
- Wong Shu-tong as Tian Feng
- Ha Kwong-li as Hong Laoshi
- Tsui Siu-ling as Azhi
- Eddy Ko as Guo Li
- Danny Chow as Bai Laosan
- Lau Jun-fai as Duhuangfeng
- Tino Wong as Li Jian

== Release ==
The film was released theatrically in Hong Kong by Seasonal Film Corporation on 20 July 1979.

=== Home media ===
The film is not widely available on tape or DVD in the West (there is a German and a French DVD release), though there was a Hong Kong release.
