= We're Going to Eat You =

1980 Hong Kong film by Tsui Hark

- Theatrical release poster
- Traditional Chinese: 地獄無門
- Simplified Chinese: 地狱无门
- Literal meaning: No door to hell
Transcriptions
Standard Mandarin
- Hanyu Pinyin: Dì Yù Wú Mén
Yue: Cantonese
- Jyutping: Dei⁶ Juk⁶ Mou⁴ Mun⁴
- Directed by: Tsui Hark
- Written by: Tsui Hark; Roy Szeto
- Produced by: Ng See Yuen; Cheung Kuen
- Starring: Norman Chu; Eddy Ko; Melvin Wong; Kwok Choi Hon; Mo-lin Cheung
- Cinematography: Lau Hung-chuen
- Edited by: Poon Hung
- Music by: Goblin (uncredited); Frankie Chan
- Production company: Seasonal Film Corporation
- Release date: 2 April 1980
- Running time: 92 minutes
- Country: Hong Kong
- Language: Cantonese
- Box office: HK$1,054,985.50

We're Going to Eat You (Chinese: 地獄無門) is a 1980 Hong Kong horror comedy film directed by Tsui Hark. The film is about a secret agent, Agent 999, who is attempting to capture a thief named Rolex, but his hunt leads him to a village that is inhabited by cannibals. The film was not as big a success in Hong Kong as Tsui's later 1980 film Dangerous Encounters of the First Kind.

== Plot ==
A secret agent named Agent 999 is in trying to apprehend a thief named Rolex. His hunt leads him to a village where residents routinely capture visitors and eat them. Although the cannibalistic ritual has been initiated by the town chief, the villagers feel close to rebelling against him as more of their food has been given to his soldiers than the townspeople.

Agent 999 is rescued from the villagers by Rolex, who has been posing as the village chief's assistant. He rescues Agent 999 as an act to help redeem his career. Soon after, Rolex is caught by the village chief and eaten. This leads to Agent 999 escaping from several different villagers along with a newfound love in his life named Eileen.

== Themes ==
We're Going to Eat You contains anti-communist themes. This is shown through the village chief's attitudes regarding the distribution of meat among the villagers and soldiers and his uniform. Tsui suggested that this theme possibly came from his own student film work.

== Production ==
The martial arts choreography was carried out by Corey Yuen.

Large portions of the music from We're Going to Eat You are taken from the Italian horror film Suspiria. Tsui said that the reason for the use of this existing music at the time was that there was no budget for an original soundtrack.

== Release ==
We're Going to Eat You debuted on 2 April 1980. It took in HK$1,054,985.50 in the Hong Kong box office. At the end of the year, it placed at number 113 of the top-grossing Hong Kong films for 1980. This was very low in comparison to Dangerous Encounters of the First Kind, which was the 33rd-highest-grossing film at the Hong Kong box office in 1980. We're Going to Eat You has been released under several titles, including Hell Has No Gates, No Door to Hell, We Are Going to Eat You, We're Going to Eat You! and Kung Fu Cannibals. Tsui has panned the film itself, saying that "it didn't turn out good".

== Bibliography ==
- Morton, Lisa (2009). The Cinema of Tsui Hark. McFarland. ISBN 978-0-7864-4460-1.
- O'Brien, Daniel (2003). Spooky Encounters: A Gwailo's Guide to Hong Kong Horror. Headpress. ISBN 1-900486-31-8.
