= The Head Hunter (1982 film) =

1982 Hong Kong film by Lau Shing-hon

- Film poster
- Traditional Chinese: 獵頭
- Simplified Chinese: 猎头
- Hanyu Pinyin: Liè Tóu
- Jyutping: Lip6 Tau4
- Directed by: Lau Shing-hon
- Written by: Szeto Cheuk-hon; Lau Shing-hon
- Produced by: Kung Chuan-kai; Law Hing-man
- Starring: Chow Yun-fat; Rosamund Kwan; Flora Cheong-Leen; Ko Chun-hsiung; Philip Chan; Tang Ching
- Cinematography: Lau Hung-chuen
- Edited by: Poon Hung
- Music by: Tang Siu-lam
- Production company: Seasonal Film Corporation
- Release date: 25 March 1982
- Running time: 98 minutes
- Country: Hong Kong
- Language: Cantonese
- Box office: HK$4,242,399

The Head Hunter is a 1982 Hong Kong action film directed by Lau Shing-hon and starring Chow Yun-fat and Rosamund Kwan. The film is also known as Long Goodbye in the United States.

== Plot summary ==
Yuen Lik (Chow Yun Fat) is a Vietnam war veteran who becomes a hit man in Hong Kong. He later falls in love with Vickie Lee (Rosamund Kwan), a news reporter who's trying to solve the string of murders in the city.

== Cast ==
- Chow Yun-fat as Yuen Lik / Nguyen Dich
- Rosamund Kwan as Ngor Pui-man / Vickie Lee
- Flora Cheong-Leen as Girl in disco
- Ko Chun-hsiung as Ngor Wing-fu / Lee Hung-fat
- Philip Chan as Kam Ta-fu / Kam Tai-yung
- Tang Ching as Tang Kin
- Wan Chi Keung as Kenny
- Melvin Wong as Inspector Lau
- Ng Hong-sang as Captain Ng
- Lo Wai as Victim
- Tsang Cho-lam as Blind man musician
- Stephen Yip as Killer with melon knife
- Yat-poon Chai as Policeman
- Wong Hak as Yuen Lik's father
- Wellington Fung
- Chan Leung as Assassin with chopper
- Jue Tak-wai
- Lee Ka-lai
