= Vince Murdocco =

Canadian actor and kickboxer

- Born: 1966 (age 59–60); Montreal, Quebec
- Occupations: Actor, stuntman, kickboxer

Vince Murdocco (born 1966) is a Canadian actor, stunt performer, and former kickboxer. He won a North American Cruiserweight Kickboxing Championship in 1990.

== Filmography ==
=== Film ===
Year	Title	Role	Notes
1990	Flesh Gordon Meets the Cosmic Cheerleaders	Flesh Gordon	
1991	Kickboxer 2	Brian Wagner	
1991	Ring of Fire	Chuck	
1993	Ring of Fire II: Blood and Steel	Chuck	
1993	Fist of Honor	Thug	Uncredited
1993	To Be the Best	Duke	Direct-to-video
1993	Private Wars	Eddie	Direct-to-video
1994	Magic Kid II	Hank	
1994	L.A. Wars	Jake Quinn	
1994	Back in Action	Bouncer	Uncredited
1996	Night Hunter	Curt Argento	
1996	Sworn to Justice	Moon	
2001	L.A.P.D.: To Protect and to Serve	Haggerty	
2002	The Barber	Agent Rayner	
2006	Canes	Uniformed Cop	
2007	Afghan Knights	Frank	
2010	The A-Team	Pike Goon #1	Also stunt performer
2010	Salvador's Deli	Danny	Also producer
2011	Rise of the Damned	Officer Savini / Orderly	
2021	New York Ninja	Jack "The Cameraman"	Voice

=== Television ===
Year	Title	Role	Notes
1989	Wiseguy	Wiseguy #3	Episode: "How Will They Remember Me?"
1992	The Comrades of Summer	Cuban pitcher	Television film
1997	Death Game	Alex	Television film
1998	Police Academy: The Series	Arnold	Episode: "Karate Cops"
2004	The Love Crimes of Gillian Guess	Cop #1, Bruce	Television film
2007	Supernatural	Steve Wandell	Episode: "Born Under a Bad Sign"
2009	Trust	Police Officer #2	Television film
2009	Wolf Canyon	Jhonny	Television film
2016	Arrow	Pino Bertinelli	Episode: "Legacy"

=== Stunt performer ===
Year	Title	Notes
2006	X-Men: The Last Stand	
2007	Fantastic Four: Rise of the Silver Surfer	Uncredited
2008	The Incredible Hulk	
2008	Tortured	Direct-to-video
2009	X-Men Origins: Wolverine	Stunt driver
2009	2012	
2010	The A-Team	Uncredited; also actor
2011	The Grey	
