= Snake in the Eagle's Shadow =

1978 Hong Kong film by Yuen Woo-ping

- Original Hong Kong film poster

Chinese name
- Traditional Chinese: 蛇形刁手
- Simplified Chinese: 蛇形刁手
Transcriptions
Standard Mandarin
- Hanyu Pinyin: Shé Xíng Diāo Shǒu
Yue: Cantonese
- Jyutping: Se4 Jing4 Diu1 Sau2
- Directed by: Yuen Woo-ping
- Written by: Ng See-yuen; Choi Gai-gwong; Tsai Chi-kuang
- Produced by: Ng See-yuen; Chen Chuan
- Starring: Jackie Chan; Yuen Siu-tien; Hwang Jang-lee
- Cinematography: Chang Hui
- Edited by: Poon Hung-yiu
- Music by: Chou Fu-liang
- Distributed by: Seasonal Film Corporation
- Release date: 1 March 1978
- Running time: 98 minutes
- Country: Hong Kong
- Language: Cantonese
- Box office: US$3 million (est.)

Snake in the Eagle's Shadow (Chinese: 蛇形刁手; lit. 'Snake Form Tricky Hand') is a 1978 Hong Kong martial arts action comedy film directed by Yuen Woo-ping in his directorial debut. It stars Jackie Chan, Hwang Jang-lee, and Yuen Woo-ping's real life father, Yuen Siu-tien. The film's plot is about Chien Fu (Jackie Chan), an orphan who is bullied at a kung fu school, meeting an old beggar, Pai Cheng-tien (Yuen Siu-tien), who becomes his sifu (teacher) and trains him in Snake kung fu.

Right after this film, Yuen Woo-ping directed Drunken Master, released in the same year, which also starred Jackie Chan, Hwang Jang-lee and Yuen Siu-tien. The film established Chan's slapstick kung fu comedy style which he further developed with Drunken Master, while also establishing the basic plot structure used in many martial arts films internationally since then.

== Plot ==
Chien Fu, an orphan adopted by a kung fu school, is overworked as their janitor while being bullied and abused by the kung fu teachers as a walking punching-bag. The school's cook, Ah-Wu, is his only sympathizer. Chien befriends an old beggar by offering him a meal and a place to stay. Unknown to Chien, the old beggar is actually Pai Cheng-tien, one of the last surviving masters of the Snake-style of kung fu. Pai is on the run from the Eagle Claw clan, which is viciously killing off all of the rival Snake-style masters. He is ambushed by Eagle Claw student Su Chen and an assassin masquerading as a Christian missionary, and is injured. After being abused once more, Chien later finds Pai and helps him recover. Pai agrees to give him more lessons, on the condition that he does not call him "sifu" ("master"), since they are friends. The real reason, however, is to keep Chien's connection with him secret from his pursuers.

Chien practices the lessons and learns to avoid being hurt by the school's bumbling teachers. When the school is invaded by the Mantis school, to everyone's amazement Chien easily defeats their master using the snake style. One of the passing wanderers who witnesses the fight is the high master of the Eagle Clan, Sheng Kuan, who recognizes the style at once and decides to tail Chien.

Chien meets Sheng Kuan, who inquires about the old beggar, claiming that he was a colleague of Pai's. As a show of 'proof', he easily fends off Chien's attacks. Chien realises that his Snake-style fighting is no match for the style practiced by the stranger, and thus creates a new style from watching his pet cat kill a cobra. Later on the Eagle Claw conspirators track down Pai, who manages to kill Su Chen. He returns to Chien for hiding, but it is then shown that Ah-Wu is also an Eagle Claw conspirator as he puts poison into their tea.

Chien rushes to fetch Sheng Kuan, but sensing danger, Pai flees, with his enemy in pursuit. As Chien hurries after them, he finally learns the truth behind the conspiracy upon defeating the fake missionary, and eventually challenges Sheng Kuan to single combat after Pai is brought down. Chien brings his new 'Cat Claw' technique—against which Sheng Kuan knows no defense—to bear, killing him. When Ah-Wu shows up after the fight and reveals his true allegiance, Chien and Pai feign defeat, and then, after fatally injuring Wu, reveal that they have by chance avoided ingesting the poison. Afterwards, the two friends wander off to refine Chien's new technique, giving it its titular name.

== Cast ==
- Jackie Chan – Chien Fu (as Cheng Lung) (voiced by Tang Wing-hung)
- Hwang Jang-lee – Sheng Kuan
- Yuen Siu-tien – Pai Chang-tien (as Simon Yuen)
- Dean Shek – Teacher Li (voiced by Lee Chung Keung)
- Fung Hak-on – Master Chao Chi-chih (voiced by Lam Pou-chuen)
- Tino Wong – Ah-Wu
- Peter Chan – Teacher Lian (voiced by Chu Chi Chung)
- Hsu Hsia – Su Chen
- Charlie Chan – Master Hung
- Roy Horan – Missionary/Russian (voiced by Chu Chi Chung)
- Fung Ging-man – Teacher Chui
- Chiang Kam – Ah Kwai (voiced by Lam Pou-chuen)
- Chen Yao-lin – Master Hung
- Lung Chen-tien – Three Provinces Champ (voiced by Ding Yue)
- Chan Lung – Substitute Instructor
- Gam Yam – Chang
- Yuen Yat-choh
- Chiu Chi-ling
- Choi Fai
- Chan Laap-ban

== Crew ==
- Producer: Ng See-yuen
- Executive Producer: Chang Chuan
- Screenplay by: Hsi Hua-an, Tsai Chi-kuang, Ng See-yuen
- Asst. Directors: Hsiao Lung, Ho Tien-cheng
- Film Editing: Pan Hsiung-yao
- Cinematography: Chang Hai
- Lighting: Lin Wei
- Music: Chou Fu-liang, Jean-Michel Jarre, Didier Marouani (both uncredited)
- Costume Designer: Kung Chuan-kai
- Set Design: Union Design
- Art: Ting Yuan-ta
- Props: Yang Shih-cheng
- Costume: Pao Kuo-lan
- Sound Effect: Wu Kuo-hua
- Sound Recording: Universal Recording Co.
- Fighting Instructors: Yuen Woo-ping, Hsu Hsia
- Asst. Fighting Instructors: Yuen Chen-wei, Yuan Hsin-yi, Yuan Kuei
- Director: Yuen Woo-ping

== Production ==
Prior to Snake in the Eagle's Shadow, Chan had worked for director Lo Wei who wanted to make him into the new "Bruce Lee" in films like New Fist of Fury. However, those films yielded relatively poor box office returns. When producer Ng See-yuen decided to make a comedy with Chan as the star, the concept did not initially meet with approval from the film distributors. However, Ng and Chan persevered and together with Drunken Master, this film launched Jackie Chan into national stardom.

The combination of comedy, martial arts, stunts and acrobatics had been done before, in Lau Kar-leung's 1975 film Spiritual Boxer. However, the release of Snake in the Eagle's Shadow heralded a new direction for Hong Kong action movies.

Ng See-yuen and Yuen Woo-ping checked over many actors for the part of the old, eccentric, wandering Kung Fu master, before Ng suggested casting Yuen's own father, Yuen Siu-tien. Yuen would continue to reprise the role of Beggar So several more times before his death in 1979.

According to his book I Am Jackie Chan: My Life in Action, Chan lost a tooth after Hwang Jang-lee kicked him in the face during a fight scene. His arm was also accidentally slashed by a sword that was supposed to be blunt, but while he was screaming in pain, the camera kept rolling.

== Music ==
As well as original music by Chou Fu-liang, the film also features Jean Michel Jarre's "Oxygène (Part 2)" and Space's "Magic Fly". Like many Hong Kong movies of the era, it also includes samples from western movie scores, including You Only Live Twice, The Spy Who Loved Me, Carrie, and Star Wars.

Film producer Serafim Karalexis got the rights to distribute the movie in America in the 80s, retitled "The Eagle's Shadow". It had a new score made due to copyright issues with the original score. The U.S. film and its promotional materials billed Chan as "Jacky Chan."

== Box office ==
At the Hong Kong box office, Snake in the Eagle's Shadow earned HK$2,708,748.20 (US$578,792), becoming the 13th-highest-grossing film of the year. In South Korea, it was the second-highest-grossing film of 1979 (behind Jackie Chan's Drunken Master), with 765,930 box admissions in Seoul, equivalent to an estimated gross revenue of approximately ₩1,148.9 million (US$2,373,760). Combined, the film grossed an estimated total of approximately US$2,952,552 in East Asia, equivalent to US$15 million adjusted for inflation.

== Separate sequel ==
In 1979, a film titled Snake in the Eagle's Shadow II a.k.a. Snaky Knight Fight Against Mantis (or Snaky Knight Fights the Mantis) was released. It was directed by Chang Hsin-yi and starred Wang Tao. However, the film was not a true sequel, rather it was an attempt by the studio to capitalize on the success of the original film. Footage including a montage and a fight scene from Snake in the Eagle's Shadow were spliced into the film. Chan's image was also used on the cover of some versions.

== Home releases ==
- On 7 February 2000, Hong Kong Legends released a DVD containing a number of extras, including a photo gallery, Jackie Chan and Hwang Jang-lee's biographies/filmographies, the English export trailer, and an interview with producer Ng See-yuen. However, it contains a cropped 2:35:1 to 1:78:1 image and the incorrect Mandarin dub with dubtitles. This DVD contains compulsory BBFC cuts amounting to roughly 45 seconds due to animal cruelty. The Chinese credit sequence is used (reverting to 2:35:1 during this section). The English dub is one created by US studios during the film's release there (under the title "The Eagle's Shadow") to avoid copyright issues with music, but everything else is the same as the export dub commissioned by Seasonal Films.
- On 18 June 2002, Destination Films released the first legal DVD in the United States. Despite having uncut status and a full 2:35:1 image in the correct Cantonese language, it still contains dubtitles. The English dub (and credit sequence) is the export one and intact.
- On 16 February 2004, Mei Ah Entertainment released a remastered DVD in Hong Kong. It has uncut 2:35:1 anamorphic video. Audio include Cantonese Dolby Digital 5.1, Cantonese Dolby Digital 2.0 Dual Mono and Mandarin Dolby Digital 2.0 Dual Mono. Subtitles include Traditional, Simplified Chinese and English. Special features are limited to Cast and Crew Info and Synopsis.
- In May 2021, 88 Films released the film on Region B Blu-ray in the UK. This edition presents the film in 2.35:1, and features Cantonese, Mandarin, and English audio tracks. Bonus features include two audio commentaries (one by Mike Leeder and Arne Venema; the other by John Kreng and R.P. "Kung Fu Bob" O'Brien), an hour-long interview with Roy Horan, and an interview with George Clarke.

== Cultural impact ==
The film established the blueprint for Jackie Chan's kung fu comedy style, which he further developed with Drunken Master (1978) released later the same year. They both follow a similar plot structure, with Chan's character being an underdog trained by Yuen Siu-tien's beggar character. Dawn Taylor of The DVD Journal also notes that the film's plot structure has been "copied oh-so-many times by a variety of Karate Kid-type American films" since the 1980s.

== See also ==
- Jackie Chan filmography
- List of Hong Kong films
- List of martial arts films
