= Vinegar Syndrome =

American film restoration and distribution company

- Industry: Film restoration Home video
- Founded: 2012; 14 years ago
- Founders: Joe Rubin; Ryan Emerson
- Headquarters: Bridgeport, Connecticut, U.S.
- Products: DVDs and Blu-ray Discs (2013–present); Exploitation.TV (2015–18)
- Website: vinegarsyndrome.com

Vinegar Syndrome is an American home video distribution company which specializes in "protecting and preserving genre films". The company was founded in 2012 in Bridgeport, Connecticut by Joe Rubin and Ryan Emerson, who created it to restore and distribute old X-rated films that were lost or otherwise unavailable. Their catalog has since expanded to include other types of cult and exploitation films, including horror films and action films.

Vinegar Syndrome has been compared to the Criterion Collection for its importance to "physical media and film preservation," as well as similarly garnering praise for high-quality home video offerings. Like the Criterion Collection, Vinegar Syndrome is considered a boutique Blu-ray label.

In September 2021, Vinegar Syndrome announced the establishment of Vinegar Syndrome Pictures (VSP), a sub-branding dedicated to the production and distribution of films. The first film released under the VSP banner was New York Ninja, which was shot in 1984 and abandoned until Vinegar Syndrome acquired the footage. Without access to the original audio or screenplay, Vinegar Syndrome then restored and reconstructed the film, adding music and newly dubbed dialogue.

== History ==
=== 2012–13: Early history ===
Vinegar Syndrome, named for the acidic smell of deteriorating film, was founded in 2012 by Joe Rubin and Ryan Emerson. The company was founded to restore and distribute X-rated films from the 1960s to the 1980s, including pornographic films released during the Golden Age of Porn, on home media. Rubin and Emerson emphasized that the company is not a part of the pornography industry, with Rubin noting that they choose to restore films that they feel "provide value", and stating: "We are film archivists who happen to focus on preserving sex films." The first three films to be released on DVD and Blu-ray by Vinegar Syndrome were each directed by Herschell Gordon Lewis—Ecstasies of Women, Linda and Abilene (both 1969), and Black Love (1971). Previously thought to be lost, they were released in 2013 in a box set titled The Lost Films of Herschell Gordon Lewis. Since that debut release, Vinegar Syndrome's catalog has expanded to include cult and exploitation films in a variety of genres, including horror films and action films.

=== 2015–18: Streaming service ventures ===
In 2015, Vinegar Syndrome began developing a subscription-based, VOD-style streaming service called Skinaflix, described by Rubin as "Netflix for sex films, but curated for cinephiles". Funded by an Indiegogo campaign, the service was initially intended to offer sexploitation films and other X-rated works, but its catalog was expanded to include films from other genres prior to its launch. Additionally, the name of the service was changed to VinegarSyndrome.TV and finally to Exploitation.TV before its launch. Exploitation.TV was launched online and on Roku devices on August 20, 2015. The service was discontinued on July 31, 2018, in order to allow Vinegar Syndrome to focus on its core operation of restoring and distributing films for physical home media.

=== 2021–present: Vinegar Syndrome Pictures (VSP) and Cinématographe ===
In September 2021, Vinegar Syndrome published a press release announcing the establishment of Vinegar Syndrome Pictures (VSP), a sub-branding dedicated to the production and distribution of films. The first film released under the VSP banner was New York Ninja, a film originally directed by and starring John Liu. Though shot in 1984, the footage for New York Ninja was shelved when the film's original distributor went bankrupt, and was eventually acquired by Vinegar Syndrome. Despite not having access to any audio, storyboards, or scripts from the original production, Vinegar Syndrome reconstructed the film using a new director, Kurtis M. Spieler, and dubbed dialogue recorded by such actors as Don "The Dragon" Wilson, Michael Berryman, and Cynthia Rothrock.

The second film released under the VSP banner, in association with Magnolia Pictures, was the 2021 British film Censor, directed by Prano Bailey-Bond. Pre-production on a new feature film by VSP is scheduled to begin in late 2021.

In December 2023, Vinegar Syndrome announced a new sub-label Cinématographe, named after the early motion picture system pioneered by the Lumière brothers. Intended to "fill gaps in the canon of American cinema", the first two releases under the label were announced for pre-order in January 2024: a 4K/Blu-ray combo pack of Little Darlings and a Blu-ray of Red Rock West.

In 2025 the studio announced that they were releasing an extended cut in 4K of Dirty Work based on the original preview audience version of the movie, before 7 minutes of footage were edited out.

== Formats ==
Vinegar Syndrome began publishing films on DVD and Blu-ray in 2013, starting with the release of the Lost Films of Herschell Gordon Lewis box set. In 2015, Chris Coffel of Bloody Disgusting ranked Vinegar Syndrome as one of the five best Blu-ray labels releasing horror films on physical media, praising the company's customer service and calling the quality of their releases "breathtaking". That same year, Matt Serafini of Dread Central wrote of Vinegar Syndrome's releases: "Vinegar Syndrome has only been on the scene for a few years, but they've proved themselves a force to be reckoned with."

== See also ==
- B movie
- Shout! Factory – similar in content
