= No Retreat, No Surrender =

1986 martial arts film by Corey Yuen

- Theatrical release poster

Chinese name
- Traditional Chinese: 就等這一天
- Simplified Chinese: 就等这一天
- Literal meaning: We've been waiting for this day
Transcriptions
Standard Mandarin
- Hanyu Pinyin: Jiù děng zhè yītiān
Yue: Cantonese
- Jyutping: Zau^{6} Dang^{2} Ze^{5} Jat^{1}tin^{1}
- Directed by: Corey Yuen
- Written by: Keith W. Strandberg
- Story by: Corey Yuen; Ng See-yuen
- Produced by: Ng See-yuen
- Starring: Kurt McKinney; J.W. Fails; Ron Pohnel; Kathie Sileno; Kim Tai-chung; Peter "Sugarfoot" Cunningham; Kent Lipham; Jean-Claude Van Damme
- Cinematography: David Golia; John Huneck
- Edited by: Allan Poon (international cut); James Melkonia (U.S. cut); Mark Pierce (U.S. cut)
- Music by: Frank Harris (international cut); Paul Gilreath (U.S. cut)
- Production companies: Seasonal Films; Balcor Film Investors
- Distributed by: New World Pictures (U.S.)
- Release dates: October 20, 1985 (Italy); May 2, 1986 (U.S.)
- Running time: 98 minutes (international cut); 83 minutes (U.S. cut)
- Country: Hong Kong; United States
- Language: English
- Box office: $4.6 million (US/Canada); 1.4 million tickets (US/France)

No Retreat, No Surrender (Chinese: 就等這一天; lit. 'We've been waiting for this day';) is a 1985 martial arts film directed by Corey Yuen in his English-language directorial debut, based on a story co-written with producer Ng See-yuen, and featuring fight choreography by Mang Hoi. It stars Kurt McKinney as Jason Stillwell, a teenager in Seattle who learns martial arts from the spirit of Bruce Lee and is eventually matched up against a Soviet fighter, played by Jean-Claude Van Damme in one of his earliest film roles.

The film was an international co-production between Hong Kong's Seasonal Film Corporation and the American company Balcor Films. It premiered in Italy on October 20, 1985, before being released in the United States on May 2, 1986. It received generally negative reviews from critics but has developed a cult following.

The film spawned two sequels, No Retreat, No Surrender 2 and No Retreat, No Surrender 3: Blood Brothers, neither of which involved McKinney or Van Damme.

== Plot ==
Jason Stillwell is a young karate student and Bruce Lee fanatic who trains in his father Tom's dojo in Sherman Oaks, California. One night after a training session, the dojo is visited by members of an organized crime syndicate looking to take over all the dojos in the country. After refusing to join the organization, Tom's leg is broken by a Soviet martial artist named Ivan "the Russian" Krachinsky, one of the boss' hired thugs. A furious Jason tries to take revenge but is easily subdued by the Soviet. Tom discourages any further effort, telling his son that fighting is not the answer.

The Stillwell family relocates to Seattle, where Jason meets R.J. Madison, and they become good friends. Jason reunites with his old girlfriend Kelly Riley, who lives in the neighborhood with her brother, Ian "Whirlwind" Riley, the newly crowned U.S. National Karate Champion. Despite this, Jason has a hard time adjusting, as he and R.J. are constantly beaten and harassed by local bullies, led by an obese boy named Scott and arrogant martial artist Dean "Shooting Star" Ramsay. After getting beaten up and humiliated by Scott and Dean at Kelly's birthday party, Jason visits the grave of Bruce Lee and asks him for help.

Later that night, Jason and Tom have a heated argument over Jason's fighting. When Jason calls his father a coward for running away from the syndicate, Tom destroys some of Jason's Bruce Lee memorabilia in the garage. Distraught, Jason consults with R.J., who helps him move all of his training gear into an empty house nearby. Exhausted from the move, Jason falls asleep at the house but is suddenly awakened by the soul of Bruce Lee, who begins to train him. Under Lee's tutelage, Jason goes from a below-average fighter to a superior martial artist, at one point able to fend off several thugs who ambush his father in a parking lot. In doing so, Jason convinces him that there are times when fighting is necessary.

Later on, Jason, Tom, and R.J. attend an annual kickboxing tournament between the Seattle Sidekicks and the Manhattan Maulers. Before the contest can get under way, the crime syndicate interrupts and makes a wager that none of the Seattle fighters can defeat Ivan. Jason has a flashback to when Ivan broke Tom's leg and attempts to warn the Seattle fighters about him, but they dismiss his concerns. While Dean and Frank are easily bested by the Soviet, Ivan's last opponent, Ian, makes an impressive showing, forcing Ivan to resort to dirty tactics to defeat him. With Ian helplessly entangled in the ring ropes, Scott attempts to bite Ivan in the leg, but the Soviet dispatches him with a headbutt. Kelly tries to stop Ivan by hitting him with a stool, but the Soviet easily disarms her and grabs her by the hair. Angered by this, Jason charges to the ring and attacks Ivan, to the crowd's delight. Utilizing his advanced training, Jason is finally able to defeat Ivan and earns the respect of his peers and family, who celebrate with him as the frustrated crime syndicate leaves Seattle.

== Cast ==
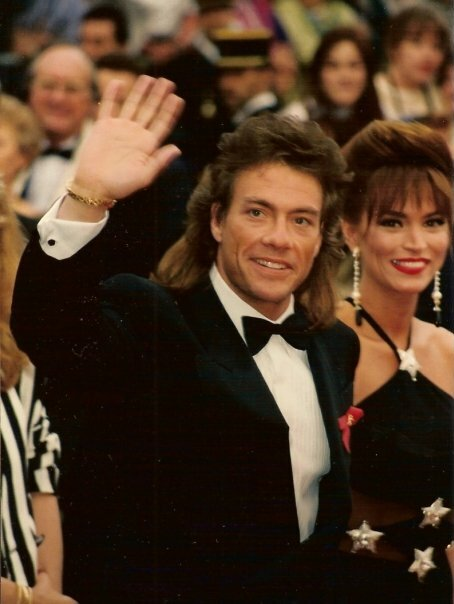
Jean-Claude Van Damme was cast as the main antagonist, Kraschinsky.

- Kurt McKinney as Jason Stillwell
- Jean-Claude Van Damme as Ivan "the Russian" Kraschinsky
- J.W. Fails as R.J. Madison
- Kathie Sileno as Kelly Riley
- Kim Tai-chung as Bruce Lee
- Kent Lipham as Scott
- Ron Pohnel as Ian "Whirlwind" Riley
- Dale Jacoby as Dean "Shooting Star" Ramsay
- Peter "Sugarfoot" Cunningham as Frank Peters
- Farid Panali as Fajad "the Headhunter" Azmand
- Mark Zacharatos as Michael Rocco
- Ty Martinez as John Alvarado
- Timothy D. Baker as Tom Stillwell
- Gloria Marziano as Mrs. Stillwell
- Paul Oswell as Trevor
- Joe Verocca as Mobster

== Production ==
=== Development and writing ===
After living in Taiwan for a year in the early 1980s, screenwriter Keith W. Strandberg became interested in working in martial arts films as an actor. He moved back to the United States and became a tour director in China, from where he continued to visit Hong Kong to make contact with producers and screenwriters. After being turned down by several studios, including Shaw Brothers, Strandberg read about Seasonal Film Corporation and got in contact with the studio head, Ng See-yuen. Ng expressed an interest in making an American film and asked if Strandberg knew anything about screenplays; Strandberg lied that he did. A year later, Ng contacted Strandberg in America, stating that he wanted to write a script for them. Strandberg wrote a draft of what would become No Retreat, No Surrender. While production began on the film, Strandberg was on set and spent hours every night changing the script to improve its quality while filming.

=== Casting ===
Jean-Claude Van Damme was cast as the Soviet villain Ivan Kraschinsky, in one of his earliest acting roles. Strandberg later said:

This was basically his first real film. We picked him out of a line. It was between him and this other guy, whose name I forget, who couldn't really move, so we went with Van Damme, who was really quite a good martial artist. He was willing to do anything.

Kim Tai-chung was a South Korean taekwondo expert who made his career in "Bruceploitation" films due to his resemblance to the late actor, most notably doubling Lee in the 1978 version of Game of Death and playing his character's brother in Game of Death II. As Kim didn't speak any English, he recited all his lines phonetically, later having his voice dubbed by another actor.

=== Filming ===
The film was shot mostly in Los Angeles, with some exterior location shooting in Seattle.

During filming, Van Damme performed a roundhouse kick on Pete Cunningham, rendering him unconscious. Actor and martial artist Timothy Baker stated that during action scenes on the set, the production manager and director, Corey Yuen, instructed Van Damme to not make contact with the other actors and stuntmen. Despite repeated warnings, Van Damme continued to do so, performing kicks on Baker during filming. Other actors and martial artists claimed that Van Damme had not been reckless with his physical contact, including Ron Pohnel, who said, "His control wasn't such as mine, but I had no complaints".

Van Damme originally had a two-picture deal with Strandberg but later broke his contract.

== Release ==
=== Theatrical ===
The film premiered in Italy on October 20, 1985, before being released in the United States by New World Pictures on May 2, 1986.

=== Home media ===
While there was never a DVD release in the United States, a Blu-ray edition of the film was published by Kino Lorber Classics in Region A, on February 21, 2017, which contained both the American theatrical release and a longer international cut.

=== Alternate versions ===
Two different versions of the film were prepared for release, an international cut by Seasonal Film Corporation and a shorter American cut by New World Pictures. The American cut runs approximately 14 minutes shorter, features a different musical score, and omits several overtly comedic scenes.

== Reception ==
=== Box office ===
No Retreat, No Surrender was released on May 2, 1986. It was the eleventh-highest grossing film on its opening week at the American box office, earning $739,723; it grossed a total of $4,662,137 in the United States and Canada.

The film sold 1.3 million tickets in the United States and 395,013 in France.

=== Critical response ===
Walter Goodman of The New York Times gave the film a negative review, writing that the story appeared to have been "slapped-together". Time Out compared it to The Last Dragon, Karate Kid, and Rocky IV, noting that it "borrows heavily" from those films and "makes them look like masterpieces". Martial arts magazine Black Belt gave the film a rating of one-and-a-half out of five, noting that Jean-Claude Van Damme does not have much screen time and that the film was derivative of The Karate Kid. Patrick Goldstein of the Los Angeles Times called it "hilariously bad" and an "amateurish clunker" with poor action scenes.

=== Legacy ===
In 1993, Black Belt placed the film at seventh on their list of top-ten choreographed martial arts films. The magazine specifically praised Van Damme's jump kicks, while noting that McKinney's look "suspiciously quick", mentioning that, "unlike the Hong Kong movie industry, American filmmakers have yet to master the technique of speeding up the film without "jumpy/fidgety" side effects". In 2017, Ed Travis of Cinapse said the film "manages to never the less [sic] entertain and delight with a combination of pure earnestness and legitimately cool fight work". Austin Trunick of Under the Radar said Van Damme's scenes "are prime Van Damme, at least, with some fantastic fight choreography and a full showcase of splits, high-kicks, and bug-eyed snarling".

The film was riffed live at a number of venues on the Mystery Science Theater 3000 Live: The Great Cheesy Movie Tour, by Joel Hodgson, in 2019. It was also riffed by RiffTrax on October 15, 2015.

== See also ==
- American films of 1986
- List of action films of the 1980s
