= Bruce Lee, D-Day at Macao =

1975 Hong Kong film by Ng See-yuen

Little Superman
- German film poster under the title Karate Superman
- 生龍活虎小英雄
- Directed by: Ng See-yuen
- Written by: Ng See-yuen; Chiu Tsing
- Produced by: Pao Ming
- Starring: Leung Siu-lung; Yuen San Wong; Mang Hoi; Hon Kwok Choi; Hu Chin; Nam Seok Hoon
- Cinematography: Chang Chi
- Edited by: Poon Hung; Sung Ming
- Music by: Stanley Chow
- Production company: The Eternal Film H.K. Co.
- Distributed by: The Eternal Film H.K. Co. Ocean Shores Video
- Release date: 10 December 1975 (Hong Kong)
- Running time: 103 minutes
- Country: Hong Kong
- Language: Mandarin

Little Superman (Chinese: 生龍活虎小英雄; pinyin: Sheng long huo hu xiao ying xiong), also known as Kung Fu Superman!, Karate Superman, Fists of Vengeance or Bruce Lee, D-Day at Macao, is a 1975 Hong Kong martial arts film directed by Ng See-yuen and starring Leung Siu-lung.

== Plot ==
During World War II, the Japanese military realizes that the Chinese government has stolen a secret Japanese military plan and Colonel Keno has been sent to Hong Kong to find the secret plan. Meanwhile, the Chinese officer Colonel Wong is ambushed and he must rely on his old friend Pang and his gang to put an end to a Japanese and send the plans to Hong Kong. Wong makes a deal and Pang and his gang help him to find the plan.

== Cast ==
- Leung Siu Lung as Pang Sifu (credited as Bruce Liang)
- Wong Yuen San as Colonel Huang Yi Qing
- Mang Hoi as Monkey (Pang's gang)
- Nam Seok Hoon as Japanese Colonel Kino
- Hu Chin as Hooker Hong Mei (as Woo Gam)
- Hon Kwok Choi as Shoeshine (Pang's gang)
- Ng Ming-Choi as Mang Gong-Bing (Pang's gang)
- Wang Yuen-Tai as Slingshot kid Salto Prince (Pang's gang)
- Suen Lam as Traitor Liu Xin Chau (Colonel Keno's assistant)
- Le Ka Ting as Otto (Colonel Keno's thug)
- Richard Cheung Kuen as Colonel Keno's thug
- Peter Chan Lung as Keto (Colonel Keno's thug)
- John Cheung Ng Long as Pipa Artist Patriot
- Lau Lee Lee as Pipa Artist's Daughter
- Ho Gwong-Ming as Wong's Partner
- Chan Lau as Disguised Thug attacking Monkey and Shoeshine (uncredited)
- Lam Hak Ming (extra)
- Leung Siu Hung (extra)
- Yeung Sai Gwan (extra)

== Trivia ==
- This was Leung Siu-Lung's first movie in which he appeared in a major starring role. It was also the film that gained him recognition as a kung-fu star.
- The movie was originally produced in 1972. However, it wasn't released to the public until 1975.
- The film has nothing to do with the Bruceploitation genre, although it mentions Bruce Lee in the title and stars frequent Bruceploitation actor Leung Siu Lung aka "Bruce Liang".
- Little Superman is similar to the Asia Television Limited TV series titled The Legendary Fok.
