= Roy Horan =

American actor (1950–2021)

- Born: Roy Horan III; January 1, 1950; Laurel, Maryland, U.S.
- Died: October 12, 2021 (aged 71); Los Angeles, California, U.S.
- Other name: Roy Haron
- Occupations: Actor, martial artist
- Years active: 1976–1991
- Spouse: Christina Horan (married 1981)
- Children: 2 (including Celina Jade)

Roy Horan III (January 1, 1950 – October 12, 2021) was an American actor and martial artist best known for his Hong Kong martial arts films. Horan played Lewis in the 1981 martial arts film Game of Death II, and Priest/Russian in Jackie Chan's 1978 martial arts film Snake in the Eagle's Shadow. He was a student of Hwang Jang-lee, who appeared with Horan in several films.

== Personal life ==
Roy Horan III was born in Laurel, Maryland in January 1950, the eldest of eight children born to Roy Horan Jr. and Eileen Mary (Buckley) Horan of Portsmouth, Rhode Island.

Horan married Christina Hui Din Fun on December 20, 1981, and they had two daughters. His daughter, Celina Jade, made her film debut in 2008's Legendary Assassin along with Tai Chi Boxer and Fatal Contact film star Wu Jing.

Horan died in Los Angeles, California, on October 12, 2021, at the age of 71.

== History and early career ==
=== Acting ===
Horan made his film debut in the 1976 movie Bruce Lee's Secret as Charlie. Horan went on to play Tolstoy in the 1977 film Snuff Bottle Connection, and the Russian priest in the 1978 Jackie Chan film Snake in the Eagle's Shadow along with Hwang Jang-lee.

In 1980s, Horan appeared as Lewis in the 1981 film Game of Death II along with Tong Lung and Hwang Jang-lee. Horan also directed in the 1981 documentary Art of High Impact Kicking. Horan played American Consular in 1987 film No Retreat, No Surrender 2, along with Hwang Jang-lee, Loren Avedon, Matthias Hues, Max Thayer and Cynthia Rothrock, which he also wrote and produced.

=== Final film and retirement from acting ===
In 1991, Horan retired from acting at the age of 41, after final film Shanghai 1920. Horan served as an Adjunct Assistant Professor in the Hong Kong Polytechnic University. Roy was the Founder and CEO of Innovea Ltd., a company that trains/consults in higher-order thinking, including creative and mindful approaches for enhancing performance and well-being. He also tackled social emotional learning for learning disabled children and trained others to develop an environmentally-friendly mindset. Roy formulated the Ocean Model which combines empirical studies of creativity and intelligence with Eastern philosophical concepts on the same. He conducted electrophysiological studies on the neuropsychological relationship between creativity and meditation and investigated the problem of creativity assessment, for which he developed the Creative Momentum Model, a tool for assessing creative achievement. Roy also designed new psychometric instruments for measuring core competencies (Integral Psychological Profile), creative potential (Information Boundaries Recognition Test; Unusual Gratitude), stress/resilience profile (StressQuest).

== Filmography ==
=== Movies ===
- Snuff Bottle Connection (1977) - Russian Prime Minister
- Bruce Lee's Secret (1977) - Charlie
- Snake in the Eagle's Shadow (1978) - Russian
- Ring of Death (1980) - Russian Prime Minister
- Game of Death II (1981) - Lewis
- Gun is Law (1983)
- No Retreat, No Surrender 2 (1987) - American Consular
- Shanghai 1920 (1991) - (final film role)

=== Director ===
- Art of High Impact Kicking (1981)
