= The Bloody Fists =

1972 Hong Kong film by Ng See-Yuen

- Film poster
- Directed by: Ng See-yuen
- Written by: Ng See-yuen
- Produced by: Jimmy L. Pascual
- Starring: Chen Siu Sing; Chen Kuan Tai
- Cinematography: Chiang Yung-chien
- Edited by: Kuo Ting-hung
- Music by: Chou Fu-liang
- Production company: Empire Cinema Centre
- Distributed by: Goldig Films
- Release date: 17 May 1972
- Running time: 97 minutes
- Country: Hong Kong
- Language: Mandarin

The Bloody Fists is a 1972 Hong Kong action film directed by Ng See-yuen and starring Chen Siu Sing and Kuan Tai Chen. The memorable fight scenes were choreographed by Yuen Woo-ping, better known for choreographing Crouching Tiger, Hidden Dragon and The Matrix.

The film was sold to and distributed by Hong Kong's then third largest movie conglomerate Goldig Films, owned by Alex Gouw.

== Plot ==
A roving band of Japanese karate fighters led by a masked, long-haired warrior (Kuan Tai Chen) enter a remote village in China hoping to get their hands on the local supply of "Dragon Herb." There they come into conflict with a group of Chinese kung fu fighters seeking to defend the herb. Tensions escalate, and the Chinese are defeated in several fights with the clearly superior Japanese force. Luckily, help arrives in the form of an outlaw kung fu expert (Chen Sing), who faces off against the Japanese leader in a climactic fight on the beach.

== Cast ==
- Chan Sing as Jiang Wu Ke (Credited as Chen Siu Sing)
- Chen Kuan Tai as Okagawa Takeo
- Henry Yu Yang as Yu Yang
- Fong Yau as Tsuchimo Daro
- San Kuai as Tetsuya
- Suen Lam as Chin San
- Hon Kwok Choi as Mute Villager Kid
- Lam Yuk Mei as Xiao Lan
- Pak Sha Lik as Hasegawa
- Lee Tin Ying as Japanese Agent with Gun (Cameo)
- Yuen Woo Ping as Tournament Fighter (Cameo)
- Wong Yu as Policeman/Villager/Samurai (extra)
- Yuen Shun-yi as Samurai (extra)
- Yuen Jan Yeung as Fighting Student (extra)
- Lee Hang as Fighting Student (extra)
- Lung Fong as Villager (extra)
- Jackie Chan as Policeman (extra)

== Background ==
Authors of The Encyclopedia of Martial Arts Movies said The Bloody Fists was Ng See-yuen's "first directorial effort". They said, "Though the martial arts are rather primitive, its success as a low-budget independent production encouraged other directors to follow suit." Bey Logan, writing in Hong Kong Action Cinema, said The Bloody Fists was "widely distributed" and the director's "first hit". Richard Meyers, writing in Films of Fury: The Kung Fu Movie Book, said the film was an "independently produced milestone" for the director. The film was initially refused a BBFC certificate.

Chen Kuan Tai was a contract actor cast in the film by Shaw Brothers Studio, but the studio recalled him, resulting in numerous appearances of his character being played by another actor wearing a black mask to conceal his identity.

Jackie Chan also makes an earlier film appearance as a policeman extra in the intro.

== Release ==
The Bloody Fists was released in Hong Kong on 17 May 1972. In the Philippines, the film was released by Asia Films in August 1972.

=== Critical response ===
A film critic for Time Out called The Bloody Fists "a lively example" of an independent production "with a good portrait of collective villainy". The critic commended the "stylish visuals and the care taken to provide adequate motivation for the usual conflict of interests between the Chinese and the Japanese".
