= Secret Rivals =

1975 Hong Kong film by James Nam and Ng See-yuen

- Film poster
- Traditional Chinese: 南拳北腿
- Jyutping: naam4 kyun4 baak1 teoi2
- Directed by: James Nam; Ng See-yuen
- Written by: Ng See-yuen; Tung Lo
- Produced by: Ng See-yuen; Kwak Jeong-Hwan
- Starring: Hwang Jang-lee; John Liu (actor); Wong Tao; Lee Ye-min; Nam Seok-hoon
- Music by: Chou Fu-Liang
- Production company: Seasonal Film Corporation
- Release date: 14 November 1975
- Running time: 90 minutes
- Country: Hong Kong
- Language: Cantonese
- Box office: $816,440.10

Secret Rivals (Chinese: 南拳北腿), a.k.a. Northern Leg, Southern Fist or Silver Fox Rivals, is a 1975 kung fu film directed by James Nam and Ng See-yuen and starring Hwang Jang-lee, John Liu and Wong Tao. The film was shot on location in South Korea and Hong Kong.

== Plot ==
Northern Leg (John Liu) travels across China thru Seoul to find the man responsible for the death of his parents. The culprit is none other than the Silver Fox (Hwang Jang-lee), a feared martial arts expert and bandit. Silver Fox has also caught the attention of Southern Fist (Wong Tao), a government agent. While Southern Fist and Northern Leg are both after the same man, they discover that alone they are no match for Silver Fox. The two heroes must combine their skills, knowing that it is the only way to gain success against their awesome adversary.

In the course of finding and defeating the Silver Fox, both Northern Leg and Southern Fist fall for the same woman, the daughter of the owner of the inn they stay at for the duration of the movie. Throughout the movie they both vie for her attention, asking the butler questions at the inn, as well as a child who follows Southern Fist throughout the film.

== Cast ==
- Hwang Jang-lee – Silver Fox
- John Liu (actor) – Northern Leg Shao Yi-fei
- Wong Tao – Southern Fist Shang Yi-wei
- Lee Ye-min - Prince
- Nam Seok-hoon - Lung Yi
- Elton Chong - Black Fox (Silver Fox's Student)
- Yeo Su-jin - Ching Chin-chin
- Park Dong-young - Prince's Bodyguard
- Kim Wang-kuk - Prince's Bodyguard
- Ma Do-sik - Prince's Bodyguard
- To Wai-wo - Russian's student
- Tong Kam-tong - thug
- Yuen Biao - Russian's student
- Yuen Wah - thug
