= The King of the Kickboxers =

1990 martial arts film directed by Lucas Lo Yuen-ming

King of the Kickboxers
- Promotional poster

Chinese name
- Traditional Chinese: 泰拳王
- Simplified Chinese: 泰拳王
- Literal meaning: Muay Thai King
Transcriptions
Standard Mandarin
- Hanyu Pinyin: Tàiquán wáng
Yue: Cantonese
- Jyutping: Taai^{3}kyun^{4} Wong^{4}
- Directed by: Lucas Lo Yuen-ming
- Screenplay by: Keith W. Strandberg
- Story by: Ng See-yuen; Keith W. Strandberg
- Produced by: Keith W. Strandberg
- Starring: Loren Avedon; Richard Jaeckel; Don Stroud; Billy Blanks; Keith H. Cooke; Sherrie Rose
- Cinematography: Viking Chiu
- Edited by: Marco Mak; Hung Poon
- Music by: Richard Yuen
- Production companies: Imperial Entertainment; Seasonal Film Corporation
- Distributed by: Imperial Entertainment (U.S.)
- Release dates: November 2, 1990 (Canada); August 9, 1991 (U.S.)
- Running time: 99 minutes
- Countries: Hong Kong; United States
- Language: English

The King of the Kickboxers (Chinese: 泰拳王; lit. 'Muay Thai King'; also released as Karate Tiger V and No Retreat, No Surrender 4) is a 1990 martial arts film directed by Lucas Lo Yuen-ming, written by Keith W. Strandberg, from a story co-written with executive producer Ng See-yuen. It stars Loren Avedon, Billy Blanks, Richard Jaeckel, Don Stroud, Keith H. Cooke and Sherrie Rose. In the film, New York cop Sean Donahue (Avedon) goes undercover in Thailand to avenge his brother's death, while breaking up a snuff film ring.

The Hong Kong-American co-production was produced by Seasonal Film Corporation and released in the United States by Imperial Entertainment on August 9, 1991.

== Plot ==
1981, Bangkok, Thailand. Sean Donahue is in the kickboxing ring against the current Thai champion. In his corner is his little brother Jake, who is cheering Sean on. Sean is able to overpower his opponent and wins after a spin kick knocks the Thai fighter out. Sean is rewarded with the championship. En route to their hotel after the fight, Jake and Sean are ambushed by some armed men. Sean is able to fight them off until he is shot at by Khan, who warned Sean he was not to have won the fight. Sean admits that it wasn't his intention but the opponent wasn't much of a contender. Khan, angry with the decision, fights Sean and obliterates him in front of young Jake. Khan performs a triple kick combination starting with a double jump kick to the head, followed by a double jump kick to the chest and a jump spinning back kick, which kills Sean. Jake, saddened and angry, races towards Khan who beats Jake up and knocks him out.

It has been ten years and Jake is now a New York City detective who has gone undercover to bust a drug deal in an abandoned warehouse. Jake mocks the dealer and tells the dealer that he is a cop. The dealer laughs it off at first, until Jake reveals his badge and wire, which infuriates his fellow officers. The dealer and his two men attempt to begin fighting Jake, who resorts to a street fighting style to ultimate stop the dealer and his men. SWAT arrives and the team leader is unhappy with Jake for his actions. Back at the office, Jake is getting reamed out by Captain O'Day, who tells Jake the dealer may have a chance to call police brutality due to his actions. However, O'Day makes Jake a deal that could get him out of his potential bind. Interpol has contacted NYPD about an operation involving snuff films and wants Jake to take on the operation. When Jake learns the operation is in Thailand, Jake refuses to take the assignment. However, that night, while viewing one of the films, he learns the man who stars in the film is Khan, which triggers the flashback of his brother's death. When Jake gets a call from O'Day to let him off the hook, Jake tells him he's taking the assignment.

Upon his arrival in Thailand, Jake meets his contact Anderson, who tells him that the men behind the snuff films look around for fighters to star in their films. Therefore, Jake must find a way to get attention. While this is going on, an American fighter, Dan Handel, is the latest star of Khan's new film, in which he learns the hard way about what filming is like. When Dan is cut for real and then shot at, he is shocked to discover the body of a dead woman. Khan arrives and beats up Dan before impaling him on a hook, causing his death. Jake's first attempt at a Muay Thai school proves to be unsuccessful. However, his actions grab the attention of Thasi, a Thai-American Muay Thai fighter. That night, as a reward for his latest actions, Khan is given a chance to choose a woman to spend the night with and chooses Molly, an American who came to Thailand to start a modeling career only to find herself duped with nowhere else to go. When she tricks Khan into doing a tradition of washing up for him, she escapes. When Khan sends men after her, Jake comes to her rescue and the two form a bond.

The next day, Thasi follows Jake, Jake confronts him only to be beaten up. Jake is convinced that he will need more than street smarts if he plans to defeat Khan. Thasi, knowing Jake will not be able to stand a chance against Khan with his current skill, recommends a fighter named Prang, who is the only man to come close to defeating Khan. Since the devastating loss, Prang has resorted to becoming a hermit living off the Mekong River. When Jake arrives to Prang's place, Prang is completely drunk and blows Jake off. As Jake sets off to leave, Prang's chimpanzee steals Jake's passport. The next day, Jake heads to Prang to retrieve his passport and sees Prang getting mugged. Jake's attempt proves unsuccessful with Prang showcasing his martial arts skills, knocking out all of the muggers and sending them away. He admits the mugging was a ruse to see how well Jake can fight and invites him to dinner.

That night, Prang tells his story of how he fought and ultimately lost to Khan. The loss caused Prang to become a drunken hermit, and yet he had wanted revenge on Khan for a long time. When Jake reveals how Khan had killed his brother ten years ago, Prang is at first reluctant to teach Jake for revenge. However, Prang sees the opportunity as redemption and decides to put Jake through a painful regiment of training. When Jake grows tired of the pain he must endure at the hands of Prang, a confrontation leads to Jake almost leaving Prang, only to apologize and decides to take the training seriously. Molly looks for Jake and must escape Khan's men. Eventually, Molly does reach Jake and the two start a romance. Jake becomes more proficient in martial arts and proves his mettle in an underground fight. When Jake begins winning his fights, it grabs the attention of Mr. McKinney, the scout for the snuff films. Jake accepts McKinney's offer. However, that night, while having dinner with Molly, Jake is stunned by the arrival of both Anderson and Capt. O'Day, who learns Jake's real reason why he accepted the mission. O'Day wants Jake off the mission, but Jake has told them he made contact and he makes his "movie" the next day. Anderson fully decides to side with Jake and at first reluctant, O'Day agrees as well.

The next day, Jake is ready and heads to the location, which consists of a booby-trapped dome made of bamboo. However, when he leaves, Khan has Molly kidnapped and Prang killed. As Jake, wearing the mask of Hanuman makes his way through the first round of goons in the dome, he plays it off pretending like he doesn't know what's going on and even throws his mask to the ground. However, Khan, wearing a black mask, arrives and has Molly tied up and throws Prang's body to the bottom, watery lake where Jake is shocked. Khan and Jake start out with a sword fight until Jake is hit in the side and Khan's mask is sliced off, revealing his face. A visibly upset Jake reveals the photo of Sean from ten years ago and throws it to Khan. Khan knows who Jake is now and promises to send him to Hell. Jake says he has been there for ten years and the two go one-on-one with both nearly equally matching their skills. Khan gets the upper hand and almost sends Jake to death via impalement on a ground spike only for Jake to barely hang on to the cage. When Khan breaks a piece of bamboo as a staff to knock Jake down, Jake grabs the staff and jumps up and begins his assault on Khan. Khan attempts the triple death kick combination only to learn that thanks to Prang's training, Jake has learned to counter the three kicks. Jake finally defeats Khan, to the shock of everyone on set. When Jake attempts to get Molly, Khan gets up and runs towards Jake, who kicks Khan to the dome entryway, which falls on Khan. In his last breath, Khan grabs the rope in an attempt to send Molly to a grounded spike in the water only for Jake to rescue her.

The Thai authorities arrive with O'Day and Anderson. Jake is relieved to see the film finally get shut down. The Thai authorities blow up the bamboo dome as Molly and Jake celebrate as they can start their lives over together.

== Cast ==
- Loren Avedon as Jake Donahue
  - Patrick Shuck as young Jake
- Billy Blanks as Khan
- Richard Jaeckel as Captain O'Day
- Don Stroud as Anderson
- Keith H. Cooke as Prang
- Sherrie Rose as Molly
- William Long as Big Boss
- Ong Soo Han as Thasi
- John Kay as Mr. Director
- David Michael Sterling as McKinney
- Michael DePasquale Jr. as Sean Donahue
- Jerry Trimble as Drug Dealer
- Bruce Fontaine as Dan Handel

== Production ==
The King of the Kickboxers was filmed on-location in Bangkok, Hong Kong, and Toronto, Canada. Tony Leung Siu-hung (Twin Dragons, Ip Man, Drunken Master II) was the action choreographer.

According to an interview with actor Loren Avedon, he shot his scenes independently with his scenes involving Richard Jaeckel as his boss. In addition, in the scene where Avedon's character does the Stallone-like scream after seeing Khan and remembering the death of his brother, Avedon told director Lo he wanted to just toss the film tape into the fire in anger. He also did not get along well with actress Sherrie Rose, describing her as a "prima donna."

According to an interview with screenwriter/producer Keith W. Strandberg, actress Sherrie Rose had issues with a scene where she was to go topless in a love scene with co-star Loren Avedon. She replaced an actress who refused to do the nudity scene but she also had complained once it was time to shoot the scene. However, the filmmakers were careful in only getting a few seconds of the nudity in the scene. Strandberg also confirmed that Billy Blanks' character of Khan is actually the son of a Thai mother abandoned by his American serviceman father, thus Khan having a hatred for Americans.

The film has some noticeable similarities to the Jean-Claude Van Damme film Kickboxer, which was released a year earlier and features similar locations, plot and general atmosphere. Van Damme was becoming a big star in the late 80s early 90s so there would be attempts to copy. He is even referenced by Avedon in a joking manner. Actor Billy Blanks appeared with Van Damme in 1990s Lionheart.

Jerry Trimble was the former PKA World Light Welterweight Champion in kickboxing.

== In popular culture ==
James Goddard, former member of Research and Development at Capcom confirmed in an interview with Capcom Unity that Blanks' character of Khan was the inspiration for his creating the character of Dee Jay in the video game Super Street Fighter II in 1993.
