= Matt Mitler =

American actor (born 1955)

- Born: May 27, 1955 (age 70)
- Occupations: Actor, voice actor, director
- Years active: 1983–present

Matt Mitler (born May 27, 1955) is an American actor and director known for his work directing over 80 theatrical productions in the U.S. and Europe, and directing and starring in the independent feature film Cracking Up. He is also director of the Dzieci Theatre, founded in 1997.

== Training ==
Matt Mitler initially trained in Humanistic and Existential Psychology, and Group Process before becoming involved with theatre. He studied with Jerzy Grotowski and Eugenio Barba in theatre; Carl Rogers and R. D. Laing in psychotherapy; and Jean Houston, Ram Dass, Elizabeth Cogburn, and Michel de Salzmann in more esoteric disciplines.

== Directing and Teaching ==
From 1977 to 2005, Mitler led non-verbal, physically-oriented therapeutic workshops in a variety of settings including Hutchings Psychiatric Center (NY); The Association for Humanistic Psychology; The National Theatre School of Sweden; New Brunswick and Union Theological Seminaries; The Institute for Clergy Excellence; The Heart of the Healer Foundation; The Parliament for the World's Religions; and the graduate school of The University of Psychology of Warsaw, where his essay, Art and Therapy was published in the anthology, New Directions in Psychotherapy.

He performed, directed, taught, and formed the international theatre collective The Tribe in Amsterdam, which presented interactive works at a variety of therapeutic institutions and was featured at Le Festival Mondial du Theatre in Nancy, France. Other festivals which presented Mitler’s work include: The Koln Festival, Vienna Festwochen, The International Festival of Fools, The Gaukler Festival of Mime, The International Festival of Mimes and Pantomimes (Poland), and The Theatre of Nations.

Mitler has designed and directed more than 80 theatrical productions; among them, his own adaptation of Nathaniel West’s Miss Lonely Hearts for the 29th Street Repertory Theatre; the critically acclaimed musical Sofrito, featuring The Latin Legends All Stars, for the New Victory Theater; and the apocalyptic epic Dirty Money (also co-author) for Teatr Am Turm in Frankfurt, Germany. He has also staged the works of dozens of solo artists and ensembles at a variety of NYC venues including The Samuel Beckett Theatre, LaMama ETC, and The Joseph Papp Public Theatre.

== Performance and Film ==
Mitler has been a stand-up comic, a mime, a celebrity impersonator, a voice artist, and a therapist. He appeared on numerous television programs and starred in over a dozen Grade Z motion pictures in the 80s before creating his own film projects. His first film feature, Cracking Up, (producer, director, writer, editor and actor), garnered a number of awards; including Best Film in The Venice International Film Festival Critic’s Week and the People’s Choice Award in The New York Underground Film Festival.

== Selected works ==
- La Census! (2020) Promotional video for the City of New York – writer, director, designer
- Kaufman's Holiday/Sunday Night Noir on iTunes (2017) A literary podcast written and voiced by Matt Mitler
- If Not Now (2001) Animal rescue documentary - Writer, Producer, Director
- National Hugging Center (1997) Ray Wonder music video (Sweden) - Writer, Producer, Director
- Cracking Up (1995) Independent feature film about a self-destructive comic - Writer, Producer, Director, Editor, Actor
- Macbeth, King of Scoutland (1993) A feature video parody of Macbeth - Producer, Director, Editor, Adaptation, Actor
- Les Enfants Miserables (1992) Cult video - Producer, Director, Editor, Actor
- Kid Scarface (1991), Dick and Jane drop Acid and Die (1991), I Was a Teenage Bride of Christ (1992) - Cult videos - Producer, Director, Actor, Editor

== Select publications ==
- A Note on Process: Theatre Group Dzieci (2013) An essay in the anthology, The Coming Interspiritual Age
- A Human Sacrifice: Art and the Art of Theatre Group Dzieci (2006) Essay in the journal, Infinite Sensitivity
- The Encyclopedia of Religion (1993) Profile on Mitler and Dzieci Theatre under Performance Theatre
- The Word Made Flesh (2004) Essay in the journal, Kosmos
- The Movie of the Month Club (2003) Essay in the anthology, Captured: A Lower East Side Film & Video History, edited by Clayton Patterson
- Art and Therapy (1981) Essay in New Directions in Psychotherapy - University of Warsaw Press

== Bibliography ==
- Mitler/Dzieci entry in Encyclopedia of Religion
- Dzieci/Mitler profile in Ecumenica, a journal of theatre and performance. In Volume 2.1, Spring 2009
- Dzieci profiled in Scene, The Quarterly Journal of the International Schools Theatre Association 2009-10 December Issue 2
- Matt Mitler – Theater, Transformation & The Pursuit Of Truth: The OwnStream Podcast Ep#4
- Mitler interview with Guy Hoffman for Gurdjieff Internet Guide
- Mitler/Dzieci profile in Working on the Inside: The Spiritual Life Through the Eyes of Actors
- Matt Mitler at IMDb
- Cracking Up on IMDb
