= No Retreat, No Surrender 2 =

1987 Hong Kong-American film by Corey Yuen

- Promotional release poster
- Directed by: Corey Yuen
- Written by: Maria Elena Cellino; Roy Horan; Keith W. Stranberg
- Produced by: Roy Horan
- Starring: Loren Avedon; Matthias Hues; Max Thayer; Cynthia Rothrock; Hwang Jang-lee
- Cinematography: Ma Kam Cheung; Nicholas Josef von Sternberg
- Edited by: Allan Poon; Kevin Sewelson
- Music by: David Spear
- Distributed by: Shapiro-Glickenhaus Entertainment
- Release dates: 5 November 1987 (Philippines); 27 January 1989 (United States)
- Running time: 104 minutes (DVD); 97 minutes (U.S.)
- Countries: Hong Kong; United States
- Language: English

No Retreat, No Surrender 2 (also known as Karate Tiger 2) is a 1987 martial arts film directed by Corey Yuen, and starring Loren Avedon, Matthias Hues, Max Thayer and Cynthia Rothrock. The film is a Hong Kong-American co-production. Despite its title, it does not have any narrative or character connection to No Retreat, No Surrender, as it plots an independent story. The film was originally released as Raging Thunder in the Philippines. It is the second installment in the No Retreat, No Surrender franchise.

The movie "Raging Thunder" (original title: No Retreat, No Surrender 2 / Raging Thunder) was released in Japanese theaters under this title. ◆It is a Hong Kong-American co-production action film released in 1987 (released in Japan in 1989).

== Plot ==
In Moc Hoa, Vietnam, a group of prisoners are executed under the watchful eye of General Ty. Meanwhile, Scott Wylde, an American college student, visits the country to visit his former teacher and best friend Mac Jarvis, meeting Terry, Mac's former lover, in the process. Terry tells Scott that Mac may be in Patpong, a seedy area of Bangkok. Scott leaves the gym and heads for his hotel, where he has dinner with his girlfriend Sulin Nguyen. During their date, Sulin's father receives a disturbing phone call and leaves his house. In the meantime, a group of thugs crash into Scott's room and kidnap Sulin. Scott fights and kills the two thugs left behind to murder him. At Sulin's house, he finds that her entire family except for her father has been killed. Scott is framed for the murders and drug possession. Despite Mr. Nguyen's pleas, the American consulate suggests sending Scott to Singapore and keeping him detained for three months. He escapes, heading to Patpong.

At Patpong, Scott finds Mac at the Super Star bar, arm wrestling with a local man. When Mac wins, his opponent attacks him with a broken bottle, but Scott intervenes. He tells a concerned Mac of his recent problems. When the duo go to dinner at a local marketside area, they are threatened by the kidnappers. They force one of the thugs to tell them where Sulin is located, learning she has been taken to Cambodia. Returning to Mac's private warehouse, an artillery factory, Scott learns that Sulin's father's was a Vietnamese general who, for the sake of his family, stopped a deal with a Soviet militia. Mac is convinced that the Soviets have joined forces with the Vietnamese army and have set up base in Cambodia. Scott decides he must rescue Sulin. The next morning, as they wait for a helicopter, they are ambushed by Thai police. However, Terry comes to aid and they narrowly escape by helicopter.

Meanwhile, the leader of the Soviet Army, Yuri, has arrived. He challenges a Chinese refugee held with the recent prisoners of war to fight for his freedom. Using his brute strength, he defeats the refugee, yet tells him he is free to leave. As the refugee starts walking away, Yuri shoots and throws him into an alligator pit. He threatens to throw Sulin in the pit as well if her father does not arrive soon.

Arriving in Cambodia, Scott, Terry, and Mac contact Colonel Tol Nol, an old customer of Mac's. Mac offers artillery in exchange for assistance, but Tol Nol refuses. However, Scott makes a deal on a new tank and Tol Nol accepts under the condition that Terry stays behind. Tol Nol's camp is then bombed, and Scott injures his arm in the process. The trio leave by foot the following day, along the way fending off a Buddhist temple used as a spy base. They skirmish with the Vietnamese army, which kidnaps Terry, and leave believing to have killed Scott and Mac with a rocket launcher. However, Scott and Mac escape the blast. Meanwhile, Mr. Nguyen is murdered by an assassin hiding in a manhole in Bangkok.

Later that night, Scott and Mac secretly plant explosives and other weaponry in the Soviet camp. The next morning, as Sulin and Terry are slated to be executed in the alligator pit, Scott and Mac attack the Soviets. They successfully kill all the soldiers except Yuri, who arrives with a machine gun as Scott is heading towards his friends; Terry sacrifices herself to save Scott from being gunned down. Mac attempts to save her and professes his love for her, but she dies from her wounds. Scott distracts Yuri with an arrow to his arm and begins a long one-on-one fight, which ends as Yuri ends up in the alligator pit, where Scott shoots him with a machine gun. He is reunited with Sulin but saddened when he learns Terry has died. Together, Scott, Sulin, and Mac, holding Terry, walk away from the camp.

== Cast ==
- Loren Avedon as Scott Wylde
- Cynthia Rothrock as Terry
- Patra Wanthivamod as Sulin Nguyen
- Max Thayer as Mac Jarvis
- Matthias Hues as Yuri
- Nirut Sirichanya as Colonel Tol Nol
- Hwang Jang-lee as Ty
- Perm Hongsakul as Mr. Nguyen
- Chesda Smithsuth as Police Captain
- Grisapong Hanviriyakitichai as Pimp
- Roy Horan as American Consular
- Bunchai Imasarunrak as Head Monk
- Opisok Praechaya as Gym Manager
- Sanchai Martves as Restaurant Manager
- Suang Sosretananant as Arm Wrestler

== Production ==
This film was originally intended to be a direct sequel to No Retreat, No Surrender, but safety concerns over filming in Cambodian jungles persuaded Jean-Claude Van Damme to back out of the project, and he convinced Kurt McKinney to do the same. McKinney added that film scheduling conflicts with Cynthia Rothrock and weather complications in Cambodia also delayed production constantly, prompting McKinney's casting agents to secure his role on General Hospital. The story and characters had to be changed with McKinney's character - Jason Stillwell (a Jeet Kune Do expert taught by the ghost of Bruce Lee) - transformed into Scott Wylde, a Tae Kwon Do expert played by Loren Avedon. Matthias Hues was also cast as the new Russian character. Loren Avedon did not follow Jean Claude's example and stayed on after this film fulfilling his three-picture contract.

Matthias Hues had no prior martial arts training. To prepare for the film, producer Roy Horan had Hues train with his martial arts teacher, co-star Hwang Jang-lee.

== Release ==
The film was released in the Philippines as Raging Thunder by Asia Films on 5 November 1987. In the United States, the film was released on 27 January 1989.

The American version of the film cuts out the opening "firing squad" scene and goes right to the airplane landing in Bangkok with the title card superimposed. Some dialogue between Terry and Scott at the Muay Thai gym was also trimmed down as was Scott's interrogation scene. All subsequent scenes involving Sulin's father and the pimp at the motel were omitted from the American version as well.

=== Home media ===
The film has never been released on Region 1 DVD, and as of December 2009, no plans have been announced for a release. It has however been readily available on Region 4 DVD and Region 2 DVD in both Australia and Europe since 2005.

== Sequel ==
It was followed by No Retreat, No Surrender 3: Blood Brothers, which again features Avedon in the lead role but is unrelated in terms of plot and characters.
