= Kurt McKinney =

American actor

- Born: Louisville, Kentucky U. S.
- Years active: 1985–present
- Spouse: Maronda McKinney (?-Present)
- Children: 2

Kurt Robin McKinney is an American actor and martial artist. McKinney played Jason Stillwell in the 1986 martial arts film No Retreat, No Surrender.

== Early years ==
A native of Louisville, Kentucky, McKinney graduated from Ninth and O Christian School in 1980 and attended the University of Louisville for one year. After that, he gained acting experience in local commercials and films while supporting himself by selling cars for Neil Huffman Dodge. Encouraged by people's comments, he left Louisville to go to Hollywood. He began martial arts at age 12 with Taekwondo, but later trained in Kickboxing.

== Acting ==
=== No Retreat, No Surrender ===
McKinney's film debut came playing Jason Stillwell in 1985 martial arts film No Retreat, No Surrender, (McKinney was 22 years old while filming took place) which also starred Jean-Claude Van Damme, J.W. Fails and Tai Chung Kim. The movie grossed $5 million at the US box office (and spawned two sequels). Although this success was moderate compared to similar movies of the time, such as the Rocky series, The Karate Kid series, or even The Last Dragon, it remains a cult classic film to many people around the world. 1987's No Retreat, No Surrender 2 was originally intended to be a direct sequel to this film, but safety concerns over filming in Cambodian jungles persuaded Van Damme to back out of the project, and he convinced McKinney to do the same.

=== TV series ===
Early in his career, McKinney had guest starring roles on series such as Gimme a Break! (1985–86), Highway to Heaven (1987) and ALF (1986). He accepted his first contract role in a TV series. He appeared as the first Ned Ashton on the ABC soap opera General Hospital.

=== Films and Guiding Light ===
After departing General Hospital, McKinney starred in the 1993 TV film Sworn to Vengeance and the unrelated 1996 feature Sworn to Justice.

His second contract role in a TV series was also his longest, appearing as Matt Reardon in the CBS soap opera Guiding Light from 1994 to 2000 and 2005 to 2009, when the series was canceled.

During his first stint in Guiding Light he filmed a minor role in 1999 film Pop. McKinney left the soap in 2000 and continued to appear in minor roles in relatively obscure independent films, including 2000's Cupid & Kate, 2001's Supertalk, 2002's Bending All the Rules and 2004's Savage Faith.

Shortly before his return to Guiding Light in 2005, reprising the role of Matt Reardon, McKinney commented in an interview that he had been busy doing several independent films in recent years saying "you'll probably never see which is unfortunately where so many of those end up."

== Personal life ==
McKinney is married to Maronda McKinney, the former Maronda Buchta, whom he met when both were 18. They have a son, Cole Madsen, and a daughter, Madison Taylor.

== Filmography ==
=== Movies ===
- No Retreat, No Surrender (1985)
- Sworn to Justice (1996)
- Pop (1999)
- Bending All the Rules (2002)
- Savage Faith (2004)
- The Last Kumite (2024)
- Lion Fist (2026)

=== Short ===
- Supertalk (2001)

=== TV movie ===
- Sworn to Vengeance (1993)
- Cupid & Cate (2000)

=== TV series ===
- ALF – 1 episode (1986)
- General Hospital Ned Ashton episodes (1988 – 1991)
- Gimme a Break! – 2 episodes (1985 – 1986)
- Guiding Light – Matt Reardon episodes (1994 – 2009)
- Highway to Heaven – 1 episode (1987)
- As the World Turns – 14 episodes (2010)
- One Life to Live – 2 episodes (2011)
- Blue Bloods – 1 episode (2011)
