= List of Hong Kong films of 1979 =

A list of films produced in Hong Kong in 1979.

== 1979 ==
Title	Director	Cast	Genre	Notes
1979
13 Styles Strike	Cheung Ying			
36 Deadly Styles	Joseph Kuo Nam Hung			
60 Second Assassin	Chung Wang, Wan Li Pang		Martial arts	
Abbott of Shaolin	Meng Hoa Ho	Lo Lieh, David Chiang	Martial arts	
Affairs	Stephen Shin Gei Yin			
The Almighty Extra	Cheung Sing Yim			
Ape Girl	Chan Chi Hwa			
Avenging Boxer				
Bastard Swordsman, The Grand Conclusion	Tommy Faan Sau Ming			
The Battle of Ku-ning-tou	Cheung Chang Chak			
The Best Hustler Wins	Wong Fung			
Big Boss 2	Do Liu Boh	Lo Lieh		
The Big Boss of Shanghai	Chen Kuan Tai			
The Big Rascal	Chi Kuan Chun			
Blind Fist of Bruce	Gam Bo			
The Blind Love				
Bloody Treasury Fight	Pao Hsueh Lieh			
Bolo	Bolo Yeung			
The Boxer's Adventure	Tyrone Hsu Tin Wing			
Boyfriend	Ng Pooi Yung, Suen Wa			
The Brothers	Hua Shan			
Bruce and the Iron Finger	Lee Tso Nam			
Bruce Lee's Secret				
Bruce the Super Hero	Bruce Le			
Busting Prostitution Rackets	John Law			
Butterfly 18	Ko Shih Hao			
Butterfly Murders	Tsui Hark			
Caning	Wong Man			
Cantonen Iron Kung Fu	Li Chao			
The Challenger	Eric Tsang	David Chiang, Norman Chu, Alan Chui Chung-San		
Champ Against Champ	Godfrey Ho	Dragon Lee, Eagle Han-ying		
Chivalrous Inn				
Choi Lee Fat Kung Fu	Chan Siu Pang			
The Choice of Love	Lau Wai Ban			
Chor Lau Heung				
Clan of Righteousness				
Cops and Robbers	Alex Cheung Kwok-Ming	Wong Chung, Cheung Kwok-Keung		
The Crane Fighters	Raymond Lui			
Crazy Boy and Pop-Eye	Phillip Kam			
Crazy Couple	Ricky Lau			
Crazy Guy with Super Kung Fu				
Crazy Hustlers	Do Ping, Ng Wui			
Crazy Partner	Wong Yuen			
The Crippled Masters	Joe Law			
Crystal Fist	Wa Yat Wang			
Cute Foster Sister	Chester Wong Chung Gwong			
Dance of Death	Chan Chi Hwa			
Dance of the Drunk Mantis	Yuen Woo Ping	Yuen Siu Tien, Hwang Jang Lee		
Dangsan Martial Arts	Lee Jeong Ho			
The Daredevils	Chang Cheh			
The Deadly Breaking Sword	Sun Chung			
Deadly Confrontation	Cheung Chang Chak			
Death Duel of Kung Fu	William Cheung Kei	Eagle Han-ying, Don Wong Tao, Mang Hoi		
Demon Strike				
Descendant of Wing Chun	Huang Ha			
Dirty Ho	Lau Kar Leung			
Disco Fever	Florence Yu			
The Dragon and the Tiger Kids	Tony Liu			
Dragon Fist	Lo Wei	Jackie Chan, James Tien, Nora Miao, Eagle Han-ying		
The Dragon, the Hero	Godfrey Ho	Dragon Lee		
Dragon's Claws	Joseph Kuo			
The Dragon's Snake Fist	Kim Si Hyeon	Dragon Lee		
The Dream Sword	Li Chao Yung			
Drunk Fish, Drunk Frog, Drunk Crab	San Kei			
Drunken Arts and Crippled Fist	Tong Dik			
Duel of the Seven Tigers	Richard Yeung Kuen			
Eighteen Women Fighters of Murim	Kim Jeong Rong			
Eunuch of the Western Palace	Wu Ma			
Everlasting Chivalry	Li Chao Yung			
The Fairy, the Ghost and Ah Chung	Patrick Lung Kong			
Fallen Flowers, Flowing Water, The Spring Is Gone				
The Fearless Hyena	Jackie Chan	Jackie Chan, James Tien, Dean Shek		
Fight	Tony Liu			
Fighting Ace	Richard Chen			
The Fighting Fool	Patrick Yuen Ho Chuen			
Fists and Guts	Lau Kar Wing			
Fists of Bruce Lee	Bruce Li Siu Lung			
Fists, Kicks, and the Evils	Do Liu Boh			
Five Super Fighters	John Law			
Flying Sword Lee	Pao Hsueh Lieh, Wu Ma			
Four Invincibles	Wa Yan			
The Foxy Ladies	Lui Kei	Wai Wang, Ai Ti, Ling Doi, Hoh Yin, Gam Lau	Crime Comedy	
From Riches to Rags	John Woo			
Full Moon Scimitar	Chu Yuan			
Funny Children		Tien Niu, Tony Ching, Siu-Tung, Chan Shen, Lee Hoi-sang, Lee Kim-Chung, Aai Dung-Gwa		
Funny Couple				
Game of Killers				
The Ghost and I	Lee Pooi Kuen			
The Ghost Story	Li Han Hsiang			
A Girl Without Sorrow	Pai Ching Jui			
The Gnome	Chow Yuk Kong			
The Gold Connection	Kuei Chih Hung			
Good Morning, Taipei				
The Great Justice	Cheung Mei Gwan			
Green Dragon Inn	Mo Man Hung			
The Handcuff	Wu Ma			
The Happenings	Yim Ho			
He Never Gives Up				
He Who Never Dies	Hua Shan			
Heaven and Hell	Chang Cheh			
The Hellfire Angel	Lam Gwok Cheung			
Hero of the Time	Hsieh Kuang Nan			
Heroes in the Late Ming Dynasty	Mo Man Hung			
High Price				
His Name Is Nobody	Karl Maka			
Hong Kong Tycoon	Cecille Tong Shu Shuen	Michael Lai Siu-Tin, Leung Sing-Bor	Drama	
Knockabout	Sammo Hung	Sammo Hung, Yuen Biao, Bryan Leung	Action / Kung fu / Comedy	
Magnificent Butcher	Yuen Woo-ping	Sammo Hung, Kwan Tak Hing, Yuen Biao	Action / Kung fu	
Master with Cracked Fingers	Chu Mu	Jackie Chan, Chan Hung Lit, Dean Shek, Simon Yuen Siu Tin		
Odd Couple	Lau Kar Wing	Sammo Hung, Lau Kar Wing, Bryan Leung	Action / Kung fu / Comedy / Drama	
The Secret	Ann Hui	Sylvia Chang, Angie Chiu Nga-Chi, Norman Chu Siu-Keung, Lai Cheuk-Cheuk, Siu-Fong Lai	Drama, thriller	Released 1 November 1979. First featured film directed by Ann Hui.
Sleeping Fist	Teddy Yip	Bryan Leung, Yuen Siu-tien	Action / Kung fu / Comedy	
Ten Tigers from Kwangtung	Chang Cheh	Ti Lung, Fu Sheng, Philip Kwok	Martial arts	
Writing Kung Fu	Bolo Yeung			
