= List of Hong Kong films of 1982 =

A list of films produced in Hong Kong in 1982:

Title	Director	Cast	Genre	Notes
2 Champions of Shaolin	Chang Cheh		Martial arts	
10 Shaolin Disciples	Joseph Lai			
36 Secrets Of Courtship	Lui Kei			
36 Super-Kids	Suen Wing Fat			
5 Pattern Dragon Claws	Godfrey Ho Chi Keung, Kim Si Hyeon			
The 82 Tenants	Lee Pooi Kuen	Margaret Lee		
Aces Go Places	Eric Tsang	Samuel Hui, Karl Maka		
The Alliance Of Hung Sect	Fong Cheung			
The Anger	Richard Chen Yao Chi			
Bastard Swordsman	Tony Liu Jun Guk			
Behind The Storm	Law Chun	Violet Lee, Danny Lee	Action / Thriller	
Boat People	Ann Hui	George Lam, Andy Lau, Cora Miao, Season Ma	Drama	Screened at the 1983 Cannes Film Festival
The Brave Archer and His Mate	Chang Cheh	Alexander Fu Sheng, Gigi Wong, Phillip Kwok, Chin Siu-ho, Lung Tien Hsiang, Wong Lik, Chiang Sheng, Lily Li, Candy Wen, Kwan Fung	Martial arts	
Brothers from the Walled City	Lam Ngai Kai	Chin Siu-ho	Drama	
Can't Stop the War	Yuen Ham Ping	Eric Tsang, Karl Maka, Dean Shek, Blackie Ko, Paul Wei Ping-ao	Comedy	
Carry On Pickpocket	Sammo Hung	Sammo Hung, Frankie Chan, Deanie Ip, Richard Ng, Pang Sau-Ha, Dick Wei, James Tien	Action / Martial arts / Comedy	
Centipede Horror	Keith Lee	Margaret Lee, Michael Miu	Horror	
Crimson Street	David Lai	Sally Yeh, Kenny Bee, Michael Chan	Romance	
The Dead and the Deadly	Wu Ma	Sammo Hung, Wu Ma, Lam Ching-ying, Cherie Chung	Action / Horror / Comedy	
Demi-Gods and Semi-Devils	Siu Sang	Norman Chu, Kent Tong, Felix Wong, Idy Chan, Lam Jan Kei, W\Eddy Ko, Austin Wai, Lau Kong, Chen Kuan-tai	Wuxia	
Devil Returns	Richard Chen	Alan Tam, Emily Cheung	Horror	
Dirty Angel	Phillip Ko	Norman Chu, Woon Koon Hung, Danny Lee, Phillip Ko, Shih Szu, Wilson Tong, Addy Sung, Chan Hung-lit, Gam Dai	Crime	
Dragon Lord	Jackie Chan	Jackie Chan, Mars, Hwang In-Shik		
Energetic 21	Chan Chuen	Leslie Cheung, Rowena Cortes	Action	
First Exposure		Danny Lee, Michelle Yim, Wong Koon Hung	Crime	
The Head Hunter	Lau Shing Hon	Chow Yun-fat, Rosamund Kwan, Wan Chi Keung, Philip Chan	Action	
Hell Has No Boundary	Richard Yuen	Derek Yee, Kent Tong, Leanne Lau, Elliot Ngok	Horror	
It Takes Two	Karl Maka	Dean Shek, Richard Ng, Cherie Chung, George Lam, Tsui Hark, Teddy Robin, Karl Maka, Sylvia Chang, Eric Tsang, Lau Kar-wing, Alan Tam, Cho Tat-wah	Comedy	
Legend of a Fighter	Yuen Woo-ping	Bryan Leung	Martial Arts	
The Miracle Fighters	Yuen Woo-ping	Bryan Leung, Yuen Cheung-yan, Yuen Yat Cho, Yuen Shun Yee, Eddy Ko, Brandy Yuen	Action / Martial arts / Comedy / Fantasy	
Monkey Business	Alfred Cheung	Kenny Bee, Anthony Chan		
My Darling, My Goddess	Tony Hope	Alan Tam, Natalis Chan, Shrila Chun, Michael Chan	Musical / Romance / Comedy	
Ninja in the Dragon's Den	Corey Yuen	Conan Lee, Hiroyuki Sanada, Hwang Jang-lee, Kwan Yung-moon	Action / Comedy	Cantonese-Japanese co-production
Nomad	Patrick Tam	Leslie Cheung, Cecilia Yip, Pat Ha, Kent Tong		
Once Upon a Rainbow	Ng Siu Wan	Patricia Chong, Marylinn Wong, Kent Tong, Ray Lui, Andy Lau, Eric Tsang	Drama	
The Perfect Match	Frankie Chan	Frankie Chan, Josephine Siao, Kent Cheng, Liu Wai-hung	Romance	
Plain Jane to the Rescue	John Woo	Josephine Siao, Ricky Hui, Roman Tam, Maggie Li Lin-Lin, Lee Ngan	Comedy	
The Postman Strikes Back	Ronny Yu	Bryan Leung, Chow Yun-fat, Cherie Chung	Historical Drama	
Raiders	Cheung San Yee	Patrick Tse, Chen Kuan-tai	Crime	
Shaolin Temple	Zhang Xinyan	Jet Li, Wong Chau Yin	Action/ Martial arts	
Sword Stained with Royal Blood	Chang Cheh	Venom Mob		
Teenage Dreamers	Clifford Choi	Leslie Cheung, Elaine Chow, Chen Pei Hsi, Rowena Cortes	Drama	
Tiger Killer (aka Military Pine)	Li Han-Hsiang	Ti Lung, Wang Ping, Wang Lai, Hui Ying-Ying	Crime Action	
Till Death Do We Scare	Lau Kar-wing	Alan Tam, Olivia Cheng, David Chiang, Raymond Wong, Eric Tsang	Horror / Comedy	
To Hell with the Devil	John Woo	Ricky Hui, Chui Git, Stanley Fung, Paul Chun, Natalis Chan, Chung Fat, Yuen Miu, John Shum	Horror / Comedy	
Winner Takes All	Wong Jing	Patrick Tse, Michael Chan, Wong Yu, Robert Mak, Chen Kuan-tai	Crime / Comedy	
