= Method Man (disambiguation) =

Method Man is an American rapper, record producer, actor, and member of the Wu-Tang Clan hip hop collective.

Method Man may also refer to:

- "Method Man" (song), by Wu-Tang Clan
- Method Man (film) a.k.a. Fearless Young Boxer, a 1979 martial arts film starring Casanova Wong and Peter Chen
