= Buddha Assassinator =

1980 Hong Kong-Taiwanese film by Tung Chin-Hu

The Buddha Assassinator
- Chinese: 佛掌皇爺 (Fo zhang huang ye)
- Directed by: Chin-Hu Tung
- Written by: Ni Kuang; Liang-Tai Tu
- Starring: Hwang Jang Lee; Mang Hoi; Chien Yuet San; Fei Lung
- Production companies: Fortuna Film Company, Golden Princess Film Production Limited
- Release date: May 15, 1980 (Hong Kong)
- Running time: 93 minutes
- Countries: Hong Kong, Taiwan
- Languages: Mandarin, Cantonese

Buddha Assassinator aka Shogun Massacre is a 1980 martial arts film directed by Tung Chin-Hu, starring Korean kicker Hwang Jang Lee.

== Plot ==
Prince Tsoi is the cruel lord of the Ching regime. He has earned his high rank by using his Lohan Fist techniques to destroy the Ming rebels, who, in turn have targeted Prince Tsoi for assassination. Enter Shao Hai, a naive kung fu scholar who earns a living by acting as a janitor for the local Shaolin Temple. The monks here apparently don't take their positions too seriously, as they spend their days bullying Shao Hai instead of praying or practicing the martial arts. Shao Hai lives with his Aunt who adopted him, and learns the martial arts from his drunken master Uncle, formerly a head monk of the local temple. The day Prince Tsoi comes to the temple, Shao Hai watches the arrival from the roofs above. He sees incognito rebel assassins about to attack Prince Tsoi, and yells out to the Prince to take cover. Upon hearing Shao Hoi's warning, the guards leap into action and chase off the rebel offenders. Prince Tsoi then shows his gratitude towards Shao Hai for potentially saving his life.

Prince Tsoi (who really doesn't like Shao Hai) allows the young man to think he has gained favor with the Ching. So this immediately goes to the head of Shao Hai and he goes around alienating those around him. Meanwhile, Shao Hai's Uncle asks him to spy on Prince Tsoi to determine which form of martial arts he practices. When Shao Hai informs his Uncle that the Prince practices Lohan style, he convinces Shao Hai to ask Prince Tsoi to teach him this super secret form of kung fu. The Prince is suspicious of Shao Hai's desire to learn Lohan Fist, but agrees because he sees the kid as a pawn of the rebels. In short time, Shao Hai learns Lohan and Buddhist Fist techniques. He finally gets to apply these skills when masked rebel assassins penetrate the palace security to kill the Prince. He beats off the assassins, and manages to kill one. When he removes the mask of the dead rebel, Shao Hai goes into shock when the assassin is none other than his Aunt who adopted him. Shao Hai now realizes that he is on the wrong side of this conflict. He goes to seek the advice of his Uncle, who recruits him into the rebellion, something that his Aunt firmly believed in.

The Prince's advisors warn him that someday Shao Hai could become a potentially great opponent with Lohan Fist training. But the Prince still plans to use Shao Hai to expose the underground. Over time, Shao Hai becomes more knowledgeable with the Lohan techniques, and begins to train his Uncle. The Prince finally catches on about whom Shao Hai is, and demands he send his Uncle to the palace to face him. After the two fight to a standstill, the Prince's guards interrupt the fight, giving the Uncle the opportunity to escape. The angered Prince Tsoi organizes a search party to track down and kill Shao Hai and his Uncle. Meanwhile, both men have hidden themselves in the forest where Uncle begins training his nephew in the ways of the Buddhist's Palm; the only known method of counteracting the Lohan Fist. After undergoing training of the Five Elements Buddha's Palm techniques, the enlightened Shao Hai is prepared to face the prince when he inevitably comes looking for him and his uncle.

== Cast ==
- Hwang Jang Lee – Prince Tsoi
- Mang Hoi – Shao Hai
- Yuet-Sang Chin – Crazy Abbot
- Fei Lung – Mo
- Chien Te-men
- Fang Fang
- Han-Chang Hu

== Reception ==
"If you're in the mood for bloody, operatic samurai carnage, Shogun Assassin absolutely delivers. However, it's also a different beast from the original films. Several characters are reworked, most notably Yagyū Retsudō, who's recast in this film as the Shogun himself, and the story is reshaped around a new framing device: narration from Daigorō, Ogami Ittō’s young son, who is almost entirely silent in the Japanese movies.", wrote Kevin Fraser for JoBLo.

Andrew Saroch, writing for FarEastFilms, stated: "The bottom line of the film is simply this: average plot; good direction; sublime fight action; recommended film."
