= Elton Chong =

South Korean actor

- Born: Jeong Jin Hwa; February 19, 1955; South Korea
- Occupation: Actor
- Years active: 1974–present

Jeong Jin Hwa (born 1955), commonly known as Elton Chong, is a South Korean martial artist, action director, and actor. Chong has mostly worked in South Korea with actors such as Eagle Han-ying, Casanova Wong, Michael Wong and Dragon Lee. While most of his work is with the director Kim Jeong Yong, Elton Chong often appeared in Godfrey Ho's movies, especially Hong Kong movies that were imported into Korea. He is perhaps best known for the movie Shaolin Drunken Monkey (known in Korea as The Shaolin Chief Cook).

== Beginning of career ==
Elton Chong was first discovered by director Lee Doo Young and his debut was as an extra in Charles Han's 1974 Korean action movie Korean Connection. During the late 1970s, Chong worked mostly as a stuntman or minor actor. He also appeared as an extra in Sammo Hung's The Shaolin Plot and Jackie Chan's Dragon Fist.

== Career in 1980s ==
Chong gradually advanced his career in the late 1980s when he started to work with director Kim Jeong Yong. By this time, Hong Kong martial arts superstar Jackie Chan hit the scene with movies such as Drunken Master, The Fearless Hyena and The Young Master. This made directors in Korea desperate to find another Korean star ro create a hit. Like Korean actor Dragon Lee, a Bruce Lee imitator, directors looked for imitators of Jackie Chan since comedic kung fu was a major hit in Korea.

Chong finally made his first starring role in the movie Shaolin Drunken Monkey where the action is similar to Chan's comedic kung fu. This debut didn't amazed the world but Chong quickly became famous in Korea. Some of his movies copied the Chan style of kung fu. For instance Chong's 1982 movie Invincible Obsessed Fighter copied the idea from The Fearless Hyena. Chong's work did not captivate the world, but his cinematic legacy carried his career through the 1980s and he grew famous in South Korea as "the king of comedy kung fu in Korea".

== After acting ==
After appearing in his last film Double Bed Trouble in South Korea, he retired from acting but continued working as an action film director because of his stunt experience. He directed the action sequences in Dragon Lee's early 1990s gangster movies such as Blues of Chong Ro and Nationwide Constituency series in Korea. After that, Chong started work as an entrepreneur, and has since run his own business. He also made a cameo appearance in the 2003 TV drama The Age of Fighting.

== Filmography ==
- Korean Connection (1974) - extra
- Gate of Destiny (1974) - extra
- The Successor (1974) - extra
- Black Leopard (1974) - extra
- Tiger of Northland (1975) - extra
- Tomb for a Strongman (1975) - extra
- Secret Rivals (1975) - Black Fox (Silver Fox's Student)
- Special Mission (1976)
- The Best Disciple (1976)
- Secret Agent (1976)
- Black Dragon River (1976) - head of the gym
- Deadly Roulette (1976) - extra
- Deadly Kick (1976) -extra
- Death Fist (1976) - thug
- The 18 Amazones (1977) - (intro)
- Lone Shaolin Avenger (1977) - one of 3 bodyguards
- Return of the Red Tiger (1977) - villain
- Shaolin Plot (1977) - Monk, extra
- Wonderman from Shaolin (1977) - villain
- Dragon Fist (1979) - extra
- The Magnificent (1979) - attacks General
- Shaolin Drunken Monkey (1981) - as Mo
- Magnificent Natural Fist (1981) - as Mo
- 10 Shaolin Disciples (1981)
- Invincible Obsessed Fighter (1982)
- The Snake Strikes Back (1982)
- The Undertaker in Sohwa Province (1983) - as Eltang Chan
- Fist of Golden Monkey (1983)
- Dragon Against Vampire (1985)
- Fighter of Death (1986)
- Ninja of the Magnificent (1987)
- Hamburger Johnny (1988)
- The Super Ninja Master (1989)
- Double Bed Trouble (1989)
- Back to Even (1992)
- The Age of Fighting (2003)
