= Dirty Angel =

Dirty Angel may refer to:

- Dirty Angel (1958 film), German film Schmutziger Engel
- Dirty Angel (1982 film), 1982 Hong Kong film
- "Dirty Angel", track on 2004 Airbourne EP Ready to Rock
