= The Korean Connection =

- Film poster
- Hangul: 돌아온 외다리
- RR: Doraon oedari
- MR: Toraon oedari
- Directed by: Lee Doo-yong
- Written by: Yu Dong-hun
- Produced by: Kwak Jeong-hwan
- Starring: Charles Han Yong Cheol; Kwan Young Moon
- Cinematography: Choi Jong-geol
- Edited by: Hyeon Dong-chun
- Music by: Kim Hie-gab
- Production company: Hap Dong Film
- Distributed by: Colorful Film Corporation
- Release date: July 20, 1974
- Running time: 88 minutes
- Country: South Korea
- Language: Korean

The Korean Connection, also known as Returned a Single-Legged Man, is a 1974 Korean martial arts film directed by Lee Doo-yong. The film stars Han Yong Cheol (credited as Billy Chan) and Kwan Young Moon.

== Plot ==
In 1930 China, the Korean professional kicker Tiger (Park Young Cheol) fell in love with Hyang Souk; however, at the same time, he made an agreement with Yamamoto (as a suggestion from Wang Herim) to steal a carriage full of gold. Tiger stole it. After Tiger realized that the carriage belonged to Hyang Souk's brother, he felt guilty, broke his leg and spent his time with an alcoholic. Meanwhile, Yamamoto killed Herim, kidnapped Hyang Souk and took over the territory. Tiger is now in a rage and, alongside Korean independent army member Kim Sung, he defeated the Yamamoto to save Hyang Souk, took the gold and went back to Korea.

== Cast ==
- Charles Han Yong Cheol as Tiger
- Kwan Young Moon as Kim Sung
- Bae Su Cheon as Yamamoto
- Jeong Ae-Jeong as Hyang Souk
- Kim Moon Ju
- Hwang Jang-lee as Kazio (uncredited)
- Mang Hoi as beggar kid (cameo, uncredited)
- Bae Su Cheol
- Kim Wang Kuk
- Park Dong Yong
- Chiu Chun
- Kim Young In
- Choe Jae Ho
- Hwang In Cheol
- Nam Seoung Guk
- Han Myeong Hwan
- Kwon Il Soo
- Elton Chong extra (uncredited)
- Huang Hwa extra (uncredited)
- Kim Young Suk extra (uncredited)
- Phillip Leung extra (uncredited)
- Lee Hing Yue extra (uncredited)
- Han Tae Il extra (uncredited)

== Media release ==
The film was released by company Hong Kong Connection under the name Deadly Fist in Korea. For VHS tape, it was released as He Who Returned with One Leg.

== Sequel ==
The film later received a sequel titled Returned a Single-Legged Man 2; its European release was titled Korean Connection 2. It was not released in the United States.
