= Eagle Han-ying =

Eagle Han-Ying
- Born: Kim Young Il; May 28, 1952; South Korea
- Died: August 12, 2003 (aged 51)
- Occupation: Actor
- Years active: 1977–1997

Eagle Han-ying, Korean name Kim Young Il (김영일) was a South Korean actor and martial artist, who rose his fame in South Korea through various Korean drama series from the 90. Outside of Korea, he is best known with his appearance with many kung fu films from the range of Korean, Hong Kong and Taiwanese production.

== Early life ==
At the early age, Han Ying was sent to the orphanage and was adopted by Chinese translator as well as the action director named Kim Cheong Do. Han Ying was soon to be exposed in the physical education, in particularly with the sports especially with the martial arts. At his early age he would train for Taekwondo (whom which he earned himself a black belt 24th degree) as well as the praying mantis style. Although he did not appear in any of the Shaw's production, but with his adopted father's suggestion as well as the recommendation, Han Ying would soon to be trained in Shaw Brothers studio as an actor trainee for 6 years. This soon gave him more flexibility with his film careers in both South Korea and as well as countries like Hong Kong and Taiwan.

After returning to Korea, he then planned to join the army school, but due to his father's persuasion, he decided to focus his aiming on becoming an actor. He later attended Chung-Ang University in which he studied in the field of theatre and acting major.

== Film career ==
Han Ying made his first film appearance in 1977 Korean, Taiwan and Indonesian co-production films Endless Fight (Pukulan Berantai), who appeared as a thug fighting oppose to Shin Il Ryong. Following up with the Endless Fight, he then appeared in series of obscure Korean martial arts films, following with Bruceploitation film Return of the Red Tiger starring Bruce Le and Return of Fist of Fury. He was often a frequent collaborator with another Taekwondo martial artist actor Casanova Wong, with the films such as Wonderman from Shaolin (1977), South Shaolin Vs. North Shaolin (1982) and even Wong's own directorial debut Fire Lord (1981).

Around 1979, Han would also collaborate with the soon to be famous Hong Kong action star Jackie Chan for twice. Both of them which worked under the Lo Wei's Hong Kong, Korean, and Taiwanese co-production with the films such as Dragon Fist (1979) and as well as making a guest appearance for Chan's directorial debut film The Fearless Hyena. Along with Chan, Han Ying would also co-star with James Tien and Yen Shi Kwan in both pictures.

Han Ying's talent would soon be discovered by many of the Taiwanese directors, such as William Cheung Ki whom gave Han Ying a starring role as a villain To Ko Lam in Death Duel of Kung Fu, the film that co-stars both Secret Rivals star John Liu (actor) and Don Wong Tao, as well as the involvement with many of the stuntman from Sammo Hung's stunt group with the likes of Chung Fat, Chin Yuet Sang and Mang Hoi.

He also worked with several of Shaw Brothers' famous leading faces as well as the stunt directors with the likes of Gordon Liu and Liu Chia Liang in Korean/Taiwanese co-production Shaolin Drunken Monk (1981) as well as Chang Cheh's frequent Venom Mob Shaw Brothers' pictures' choreographer Robert Tai with another co-production Kung fu adventure film Ninja Vs. Shaolin Guards (1984) co-starring Alexander Lo Rei.

== Film success ==
Following with the film success in Hong Kong, he equally had a cult status on the silver screen from his home country of South Korea. He would continue appearing in the martial arts action genre, in particularly after the success of comedic kung fu films from Jackie Chan's era. Han Ying would frequently collaborate with the veteran Korean director Kim Jeong Yong as well as to co-star with the fellow Korean martial artist actor Elton Chong.

The trio worked on at least 6 pictures together. One of which was titled Chef of the Shaolin Temple (소림사 주방장), also known as Shaolin Drunken Monkey (1981). The film was a huge success in South Korea and currently gained the cult status in among the Korean fans. Following with the Shaolin Drunken Monkey, they've also worked together in 10 Shaolin Disciples, The Snake Strikes Back, Fist of the Golden Monkey, Dragon Against Vampire and their last on-screen collaboration Ninja of the Magnificent which came out in 1987.

== End of the career and death ==
After making several films in the 1980s, he eventually retired from acting in 1987. However, in 1992, he made the appearance once again in Walking Towards the Sky the Korean movie and in addition he also made the appearance in 1997 television series Love and War. After Walking Towards the Sky, Han became a monk in Gyeongsang Province after his retirement from filming business. In 2002, he was diagnosed with stomach cancer and died August 12, 2003.

== Filmography ==
- Endless Fight (1977) - Fighter in Korea
- Return of Red Tiger (1977) - Thug Leader
- Young Ja's Heydays (1977)
- Wonderman from Shaolin (1977) - Shaolin Monk
- Shaolin Plot (1977) - Shaolin Monk
- Duel with the Devils (1977)
- Gate of Life or Death (1977)
- Return of Fist of Fury (1977)
- Call Me Samryong (1977)
- The Fist of Hercules (1978)
- Manhunt (1978)
- The Fearless Hyena (1979) - Chin Wa Li
- Dragon Fist (1979) - Nan Qing
- Death Duel of Kung Fu (1979) - To Ku Lan
- Quick Step Mantis (1979)
- The Woman Who Leaves Work In The Morning(1979)
- Champ Against Champ (1980) - Kai's Fighter (credited as Charles Han)
- Fire Lord (1980)
- Ninja Holocaust (1980)
- Hitman in the Hand of Buddha (1981) - Monk (cameo)
- The Shaolin Drunken Monk (1981) - Wong Kin Chung
- Shaolin Drunken Monkey (1981) - Silver Eagle
- Duel of the Tough (1981)
- 10 Shaolin Disciples (1981) - Warlord's Son
- The Snake Strikes Back (1982)
- Jackie and Bruce to the Rescue (1982)
- Revenge of Drunken Master (1982)
- Incredible Shaolin Thunderkick (1982) - Iron Claw
- Fist of the Golden Monkey (1983) - Leader of 8 Beasts
- 7-Star Grand Mantis (1983) - Bong Chu
- Shaolin and Taichi (1983) - Warlord
- Sandong Chinese Restaurant (1983) - Bong Ryung
- South Shaolin VS North Shaolin (1984)
- Ninja VS Shaolin guards (1984) - Hung Gin
- Wild Panther (1984) - Big Boss
- Dragon Against Vampire (1985)
- Sword of Evil Power (1985)
- Ninja of the Magnificent (1987)
- The Meteor Prince from the Milky Way 3 (1988)
- Marihuana (1988)
- Milk Chocolate 1950-1990 (1990)
- Woman in Philopon Addict (1990)
- The Dark City (1990)
- Distant Saigon (1990)
- The Third District (1991)
- Midnight Escape (1992)
- Back to Even (1992)
- The Girl's Man (1993)
- Christmas Present (1994)
- The Marine Rebelion (1995)

=== Television series ===
- Red Zone (1992~1993) - as Song Myung Kyu
- Walking To Heaven (1993) - as Jet
- Love and War (1995)
- New Generation - Adults Don't Know (1995~1998) - Teacher
- Shooting (1996) - Coach
- Happy Time, Masterpiece Theater (2014) (Movie review, archive footage documentary)

=== Documentary ===
- Top Fighters (Documentary, footage from Shaolin Drunk Monk and Dragon Fist)
