= Conan Lee =

American actor

Conan Lee Yuen-Ba (Chinese: 李元霸) is a Hong Kong-born American film actor and martial artist.

== Early life ==
Conan Lee was born in Hong Kong, but grew up in Queens, New York. During this period he was trained in his father's self-defense methods. Lee explored a wide variety of both Western and Chinese martial arts. These included Boxing, Kung Fu, Taekwondo and Karate. He excelled in the Northern Shaolin and Wing Chun styles, and eventually created a style called "Realistic Fist".

== Career ==
Lee is best known for his roles in the action comedy film Ninja in the Dragon's Den (1982) alongside popular Japanese actor Hiroyuki Sanada, and the buddy cop film Tiger on the Beat with Chow Yun-fat. Other TV and film appearances include MacGyver, Armed Response (with David Carradine), New York Cop (with Chad McQueen), Aces Go Places 5: The Terracotta Hit (appearing as Rambo), First Strike, Lethal Weapon 4, and the 1986 science fiction action film Eliminators.

Lee stopped acting in the 1990s due to his mother's ailing health.

In 2009, Lee made a brief appearance in an episode of the American crime series Numb3rs. Lee also voiced several characters in the 2012 video game Sleeping Dogs.

== Filmography ==
=== Film ===
Year	Title	Role	Notes
1982	Ninja in the Dragon's Den	Sun Jing	
1985	Gymkata	Hao	
1985	Maxie	Chinese Movie Patron	
1986	Eliminators	Kuji	
1986	Big Trouble in Little China	Chang Sing Member	Uncredited
1986	Armed Response	Kon Ozu	
1988	Tiger on the Beat	CID Officer Michael Tso	
1989	Aces Go Places 5: The Terracotta Hit	Chinese Rambo	
1990	Tiger on the Beat 2	Buffalo	
1990	Killer's Romance	Bobby	
1990	Prince of the Sun	Tiger	
1991	Fury in Red	Ray	
1993	New York Cop	Konen Li	
1994	The King Of The Sea	Cheung Po Tsai	
1995	Kuang qing sha shou	Cop	
1996	First Strike	Chinese Group #2	
1996	Carjack	Lee	Also writer and director
1998	Lethal Weapon 4	Four Father	
2001	The Pharaoh Project	Curtis Cohn / Genghis Khan	
2005	Smile	Factory Worker	
2005	N.T.V. Volume 1	Mr. Fing Lee	
2007	Lady Samurai	Khang	
2018	Mom	Conan	Also writer and director
2018	MMA	Conan Lee	Also writer and director

=== Television ===
Year	Title	Role	Notes
1985	Falcon Crest	Chao-Li's Cousin #1	3 episodes
1986	MacGyver	Ji	Episode: "The Wish Child"
1992	Stormy Weathers	Conan	Television film
2009	Numbers	Jimmy Lin	Episode: "Trouble in Chinatown"
