= Lethal Panther 2 =

1993 Filipino-Hong Kong-Japanese film by Phillip Ko

Magkasangga sa Batas
- Directed by: Phillip Ko; Erwin Lanado
- Screenplay by: Erwin Lanado; Tat-Choi Lee (International version)
- Story by: Erwin Lanado
- Produced by: Luis Sy; Kai-Ping Cheung (International version)
- Starring: Cynthia Luster; Stella Mari; Edu Manzano
- Cinematography: Eduardo Cabrales; Peter Li; Ying-Tak Lee (International version)
- Edited by: Phillip Ko; Ever Ramos; Tony Sy; Grand Yip (International version)
- Music by: Jaime Fabregas; Nilson Chow (International version)
- Production company: Harvest International Films
- Distributed by: Harvest International Films
- Release date: February 2, 1993
- Running time: 105 minutes
- Countries: Philippines; Hong Kong; Japan
- Languages: Filipino; English; Cantonese; Japanese

Magkasangga sa Batas (International title: Lethal Panther 2 or Lethal Panther 2: Partners In Law) is a 1993 action film directed by Phillip Ko and Erwin Lanado. A Filipino-Hong Kong-Japanese co-production, the film stars Cynthia Luster, Stella Mari and Edu Manzano. Although it is a sequel to the 1990 movie Lethal Panther, their plots are not related to each other.

== Plot ==
NBI agent Albert Moran is on the lookout for the group blackmailing him. With the help of his fellow agents and outside forces within Interpol, Moran endures adversity that further motivates him to pursue justice.

== Cast ==
- Cynthia Luster as Jane Matsuko
- Stella Mari as Sharon
- Edu Manzano as Albert Moran
- Monsour del Rosario as Nestor
- Sheila Ysrael as Cindy
- Charlie Davao as Maj. Foronda
- Lovely Rivero as Wife of Albert
- Johnny Wilson as Mr. Castelo
- Marita Zobel as Albert's Mother
- Lani Lobangco as Nestor's Wife
- Paolo Contis as Boyet
- Gabriel Romulo as Yakuza
- Rachel Lobangco as Yakuza
- King Gutierrez as Yakuza
- Edwin Reyes as Yakuza
- Boy Fernandez as Yakuza
- Telly Babasa as Yakuza
- Naty Santiago as Yakuza
- Louie Katana as Yakuza

== Production ==
The film had a working title Kapag ang Batas Kinalaban and internationally Target: Albert Moran.
