= Phillip Ko =

Hong Kong film actor and director (1949–2017)

Phillip Ko Fei
- 高飛
- Born: Lam Pak-hang; June 18, 1949; British Hong Kong
- Died: March 30, 2017 (aged 67); Hong Kong
- Occupation(s): Actor, film director, film producer

Birth name
- Traditional Chinese: 林伯恆
- Simplified Chinese: 林伯恒
Transcriptions
Standard Mandarin
- Hanyu Pinyin: Lín Bó Héng
Yue: Cantonese
- Jyutping: Lam4 Pak3 Hang4

Stage name
- Traditional Chinese: 高飛
- Simplified Chinese: 高飞
Transcriptions
Standard Mandarin
- Hanyu Pinyin: Gāo Fēi
Yue: Cantonese
- Jyutping: Gou1 Fei1

Phillip Ko Fei (Chinese: 高飛, 18 June 1949 – 31 March 2017) was a Hong Kong actor, screenwriter and film director.

== Early life ==
Ko was born Lam Pak-hang (Chinese: 林伯恆) in Hong Kong on 18 June 1949. After moving with his family to mainland China, he began learning Choy Li Fut in his youth. Ko would later attend the University of China for his education.

== Career ==
Ko began working in the film industry at the age of 19. He made his on-screen debut as a stuntman in the Shaw Brothers production of The Heroic Ones (1970).

As an actor, he was predominately known as playing the role of the antagonist. He moved forward from acting by directing his first feature film, Dirty Angel, in 1981.

Ko died of complications from prostate cancer on 31 March 2017.

== Filmography ==
=== Director ===
- Sha bao xiong di (1982)
- Ma tou (1983)
- The Brave Platoon (1987)
- Official Exterminator 3: Joy for Living Dead (1987)
- Official Exterminator 2: Heaven's Hell (1987)
- High Sky Mission (1987)
- Angel's Blood Mission (1987)
- Hunting Express (1988)
- American Force 2: The Untouchable Glory (1988)
- The Extreme Project (1988)
- Red Heat Conspiracy (1988)
- Platoon Warriors (1988, Video)
- L.A. Connection (1988)
- Die to Win (1988)
- Mu zhong wu ren (1989)
- A Killer's Romance (1990)
- Dong fang lao hu (1990)
- Zhi zun te jing (1992)
- Conexão Interpol (1992)
- Long kua si hai zhi zhi ming qing ren (1993)
- Magkasangga sa Batas (1993)
- Kakambal ko sa tapang (1993)
- Magkasangga 2000 (1993)
- Yue gui zhi lang (1994)
- Iyo ang Hong Kong, akin ang Manila! (1994)
- Hong tian mi ling (1994)
- Angel on Fire (1995)
- Matira ang matibay (1995)
- Hubungan jenayah (1995)
- Bad Blood (1996, TV Movie)
- Sandata (1996)
- Duwelo (1996)
- Bangis (1996)
- Desperate Hours (1997, TV Movie)
- Nightmare Honeymoon (1997, TV Movie)
- Matang agila (1997)
- Kasangga mo ako sa huling laban (1997)
- Buhawi Jack (1998)
- Dian zi ge men zhan shi (1998)
- Hitman's Call (1999)
- Sao hei te qian dui (1999)
- Internet Mirage (1999)
- Black Gun Team (1999)
- Hong qiang dao ying (2000)
- Supercop.com (2000)
- Laban kung laban (2000)
- Xtreme Warriors (2001)
- Payment in Blood (2001)
- Huo xian sheng si lian (2002)

=== Screenwriter ===
- Lang man sha shou zi you ren (1990)
- Iyo ang Hong Kong, akin ang Manila! (1994)
- Die xue rou qing (1995)
- Magkasangga 2000 (1995)
- Dian zi ge men zhan shi (1998)
- Sao hei te qian dui (1999)
- Supercop.com (2000)
- Huo xian sheng si lian (2002)

=== Actor ===
- The Anonymous Heroes (1971)
- Quan ji (1971)
- The Deadly Duo (1971)
- The Angry Guest (1972)
- The Water Margin (1972)
- The Rendezvous of Warriors (1973)
- Enter the Dragon (1973) - Guard (uncredited)
- Yu nu chou (1973)
- Xiao bi hu (1973)
- Ming yi tiao (1973)
- Chao Zhou da feng bao (1973)
- Dragon Squad (1974)
- Dynamite Brothers (1974) - Tuen's henchman (uncredited)
- Shaolin Vengeance (1974)
- Yi quan yi kuai qian (1974)
- Blood Revenge (1974)
- Rou pu tuan (1975)
- The Black Dragon Revenges the Death of Bruce Lee (1975)
- 7 Man Army (1976)
- Super Dragon (1982)
- The Best of Shaolin Kung Fu (1976)
- Qing chang zhan chang (1976)
- Shao Lin zu shi (1976)
- Lü si niang chuang shao lin (1976)
- Heroine Kan Lien Chu (1976)
- Broken House (1976)
- Gan Lian Zhu dai po hong lian si (1977)
- Nan quan bei tui zhan yan wang (1977) - Lung Fong
- One Armed Chivalry (1977)
- Secret Rivals 2 (1977)
- Shen dao liu xing chuan (1977)
- The Invincible Armour (1977)
- Jing wu men xu ji (1977)
- The Four Shaolin Challengers (1977)
- Shao Lin Kung-Fu Mystagogue (1977)
- Return of the Chinese Boxer (1977)
- Shen tui (1977) - Fong Kang / Tu Tang
- Bandits, Prostitutes and Silver (1977) - Three Scar Chief
- Along Comes the Tiger (1977)
- Fighting of Shaolin Monks (1977) - One of the 10 Brothers
- Shaolin Brothers (1977)
- The Criminal (1977)
- Five Kung Fu Daredevil Heroes (1977) - Lama Priest
- Eight Masters (1977)
- Fists of Dragons (1977)
- Sea God and Ghosts (1977)
- The Mysterious Heroes (1978)
- Fury of the Shaolin Master (1978)
- Wu Tang Swordsman (1978)
- Gu jian ying hun (1978)
- Shaolin Tough Kid (1978)
- Wan shi tian jiao (1978)
- The Souls of the Sword (1978)
- Flying Masters of Kung Fu (1978)
- Nanghwabigwon (1978)
- Dragon of the Swords Man (1978)
- Dragon on Fire (1978)
- The Incredible Kung Fu Master (1979
- Iron Dragon Strikes Back (1979)
- Duel of the Seven Tiger (1979) - Sze
- Lie ri kuang feng ye huo (1979)
- Duan jian wu qing (1979) - Tsan Hsin-Chou
- Ti guan (1979) - Master Pao Shen Chang
- Goose Boxer (1979) - Lung Chung Fung
- Hong yi la ma (1979)
- Odaegwanmun (1979) - Priest Wu Kuo
- The Dragon, the Hero (1979)
- Xiong sheng Cai Li Fo (1979)
- The Lawman (1979)
- Fury in the Shaolin Temple (1979)
- Ninja Massacre (1979)
- Death Duel of Kung Fu (1979)
- The Fists, the Kicks and the Evil (1979)
- Fung Kyun Din Teoi (1979) - Drunken master
- 2 Wondrous Tigers (1979) - Robert Ko
- She xing zui bu (1980) - The Kuo Housekeeper
- Tian tang meng (1980)
- She mao he hun xing quan (1980)
- Zei zang (1980) - Kao Yu-Cheng
- Two for the Road (1980) - Crazy Horse
- Tiger Over Wall (1980) - Fong
- Mao ling (1980)
- Master Killers (1980)
- The Challenger (1980)
- Manhunt (1980)
- The Mask of Vengeance (1980)
- Any Which Way You Punch (1980)
- Wu ting (1981) - Fingers Hung
- Yong zhe wu ju (1981) - Master Tam
- Xiong xie (1981)
- Ninja Kung Fu Emperor (1981) - Master Fok
- Bing bing zei zei (1981)
- Huo Yuan-Jia (1982) - Master Fok
- Clan Feuds (1982)
- Chi se Xiang Wei she (1982)
- Sha bao xiong di (1982)
- Zei xing (1982)
- Brothers from the Walled City (1982)
- San sheng wu nai shei de cuo (1982)
- The Fearless Jackal (1982)
- Lie mo zhe (1982) - Naiwen
- Shou xing di yu nu (1982)
- Mie men zhi huo (1982)
- Dragon Blood (1982) - Ko Fei Hung
- Shaolin Intruders (1983) - Abbot Jianxing
- Mo (1983)
- The Pier (1983)
- Zhong gui (1983) - Chou Tang
- Mission Thunderbolt (1983) - White Tycoon
- Eight Diagram Pole Fighter (1984) - Abbot
- Bu yi shen xiang (1984)
- Wu ming huo (1984) - Ah-Fai
- Lightning Fists of Shaolin (1984) - Golden Silk Cat
- Police Pool of Blood (1984)
- Sex Beyond the Grave (1984)
- Wo ai Luo Landu (1984)
- Zou huo pao (1984)
- Wang zi cheng chong (1984) - Lung
- Mao tou ying yu xiao fei xiang (1984) - Thug
- Zhi ming jin gang quan (1984, TV Movie)
- Return of Bastard Swordsman (1984)
- Cuo ti ren (1985)
- Yellow Skin (1985)
- Ninja Holocaust (1985)
- Jiao tou fa wei (1985)
- Long fa wei (1985)
- This Man Is Dangerous (1985) - Sgt Philip Chen
- Gui ma fei ren (1985)
- Twinkle, Twinkle, Lucky Stars (1985) - Warehouse Thug #4
- My Mind, Your Body (1985) - Philip
- Heart of Dragon (1985) - Kim's Man #2
- Leng xie tu fu (1985)
- Majestic Thunderbolt (1985) - Phillip
- City Ninja (1985)
- Rivals of Silver Fox (1985)
- Zhu zai chu geng (1986) - Robber
- Millionaires Express (1986) - Mountain Bandit
- Ninja Terminator (1986)
- Nui ji za pai jun (1986)
- Mo fei cui (1986) - Shen
- Liu mang ying xiong (1986)
- Tough Ninja the Shadow Warrior (1986)
- Project Ninja Daredevils (1986)
- Ninja Destroyer (1986)
- The Ultimate Ninja (1986)
- Scared Stiff (1987) - Inspector Chow's Man
- Eastern Condors (1987) - Viet Cong Soldier
- Bo sha (1987)
- Yong ai zhuo yi ren (1987) - Kumaguza's HK Thug
- High Sky Mission (1987)
- Chu nu jiang (1988)
- Guo bu xin lang (1988) - Crazy Eyes
- Dragons Forever (1988) - Thug
- Tiger on Beat (1988) - Heroin dealer
- In the Blood (1988)
- Diamond Ninja Force (1988)
- Fat lut mo ching (1988)
- Wu long zei ti shen (1988) - Ai B
- Hao nu shi ba jia (1988)
- Mong ming yuen yeung (1988) - Lu's Man
- Ying xiong xue (1988)
- The Dragon Family (1988) - Keung's top henchman
- Tong gen sheng (1989) - Fei
- Mu zhong wu ren (1989) - Sergeant Kau
- Hak do fuk sing (1989) - Yakuza
- Magnificent 7 Kung-Fu Kids (1989)
- Just Heroes (1989) - Thug
- Ngoh joi gong woo (1989)
- Tie han rou qing (1989)
- Huang jia fei feng (1989) - Killer Fei
- Battle in Hell (1989)
- Hak do fuk sing (1989)
- Lung foo chuk gang II (1990) - Hood
- Chi se da feng bao (1990) - Ko Mok-Fu
- Born to Fight (1990) (1990) - Crowbar
- Kei bing (1990)
- A Killer's Romance (1990) - 'Charlie' Chan Ben
- Dong fang lao hu (1990) - Mr. King
- Tian di xuan men (1991) - Film Director
- Ying lun yuet jin (1991) - Yuen Tai-Fei
- Bok geuk cha lou (1991)
- Eastern Heroes (1991)
- Zhi fa wei long (1992) - Sgt. Franco
- Long zhi gen (1992)
- Lang zi sha shou ba wang hua (1992)
- Gui huo de gu shi (1992)
- Zhi zun te jing (1992)
- Son of the Dragon (1992)
- Killer Flower (1992)
- Long kua si hai zhi zhi ming qing ren (1993) - Peter Pang
- Magkasangga sa batas (1993) - Nakada / Chuda (international version) (uncredited)
- An lian ni (1993)
- Kakambal ko sa tapang (1993) - Philip
- Yue gui zhi lang (1994)
- Iyo ang Hong Kong, akin ang Manila! (1994)
- Hong tian mi ling (1994) - Wong Jun Lee / Henry Wong
- Cobra (1994)
- Gun gun hong chun (1995) - Li Tian-Sin
- Angel on Fire (1995) - Rocks / Ko Cheung
- The Adventurers (1995) - Wah
- Magkasangga 2000 (1995) - Benny Gabaldon
- Hubungan jenayah (1995)
- Ultimate Revenge (1995)
- The Vengeance (1995)
- Wei qing zhui zong (1996)
- Sandata (1996)
- Romano Sagrado: Talim sa dilim (1996)
- Batang Z (1996)
- The Suspect (1998)
- Dian zi ge men zhan shi (1998) - Black Ninja
- Fung lau 3 chong si (1998) - Pau Shu-Hei
- Hitman's Call (1999)
- Sao hei te qian dui (1999)
- Black Gun Team (1999)
- Internet Mirage (1999)
- Lethal Combat (1999)
- Hong qiang dao ying (2000)
- Supercop.com (2000)
- Blood on Bullet (2000)
- Huo wu yao yang (2001)
- Te gong shen die (2001)
- The Story of Freeman (2001) - Iron Wolf
- Ying xiong shen hua (2001)
- Shadow Mask (2001) - Red Wood
- Huo xian sheng si lian (2002)
- The Nugget (2002) - Chinese Restaurant Manager (final film role)
