= The Stunt Woman =

1996 Hong Kong film by Ann Hui

- Simplified Chinese: 阿金
- Hanyu Pinyin: Ah-kam
- Directed by: Ann Hui
- Written by: Kin Chung Chan; Man-Keung Chan
- Produced by: Raymond Chow; Catherine Hun; Ka-Foo Lau
- Starring: Michelle Yeoh; Sammo Hung; Jimmy Wong Ga-Lok
- Cinematography: Ardy Lam
- Edited by: Yee-Shun Wong
- Music by: Yoshihide Ôtomo
- Production companies: Golden Harvest; Daca Entertainment; Golden Movies International
- Distributed by: Golden Harvest Distribution
- Release date: 10 October 1996
- Running time: 95 minutes
- Country: Hong Kong
- Language: Cantonese
- Box office: HK$1,163,320

The Stunt Woman (Chinese: 阿金; Jyutping: Ah-kam) is a 1996 Hong Kong action film directed by Ann Hui, and produced by Raymond Chow, Catherine Hun and Ka-Foo Lau. It stars Michelle Yeoh and Sammo Hung as stunt workers toiling behind the scenes of the film industry with little recognition of the work they do or the danger it entails. The film's postscript details the serious injury which Yeoh suffered after misjudging a stunt leaping from an overpass onto a moving truck, leaving her seriously injured. The film is dedicated to her, and to the other stunt workers who inspired the film.

The film was rated Cat II A. It opened in Hong Kong on 10 October, 1996 and grossed HK $1,163,320 at the box office. In 2023 Criterion Channel featured it as part of their Michelle Yeoh Kicks Ass collection.

== Cast ==
- Michelle Yeoh as Ah Kam
- Sammo Hung Kam-Bo as Master Tung
- Jimmy Wong Ga-Lok as Sam
- Ken Lo Wing-Hang as Ah Long
- Mang Hoi as Copy
- Nick Cheung Ka-fai as Whacko
- Michael Lam Wai-Leung as Scarface
- Paco Yick Tin-Hung as Fong
- Jack Wong Wai-Leung as Chan, stuntman
- Lawrence Lau Kwok-Cheong as Pyrotechnics expert
- Crystal Kwok Gam-Yan as Kam's roommate

== Production ==
Yeoh suffered a severe back injury while filming a stunt where she jumped from an overpass onto a moving truck. While shooting the second take, she fell between two mattresses. She was taken to a nearby hospital, where she was placed in a body cast and treated for several cracked ribs. While convalescing, Yeoh considered retiring from action films. However, filmmaker Quentin Tarantino, on a visit to Hong Kong, dissuaded her. She made her Hollywood debut the following year in the James Bond film Tomorrow Never Dies.
