= Duwelo =

Philippine action film

- Directed by: Phillip Ko; Teddy Gomez
- Screenplay by: Al Marcelo
- Story by: Ronald Stephen Monteverde
- Produced by: Ronald Stephen Monteverde
- Starring: Eddie Garcia; Zoren Legaspi
- Cinematography: Eduardo Cabrales
- Edited by: Joe Solo
- Music by: Mon del Rosario
- Production company: Regal Films
- Distributed by: Regal Films
- Release date: June 6, 1996
- Running time: 96 minutes
- Country: Philippines
- Language: Filipino

Duwelo (lit. "Duel") is a 1996 Philippine action film directed by Phillip Ko and Teddy Gomez. The film stars Eddie Garcia and Zoren Legaspi.

The film is streaming online on YouTube.

== Plot ==
Ramon Aguila (Eddie) is hired by Don Miguel (Luis) to kill Griego (Bernard) and his allies, all whom he blames for his daughter's death due to drug overdose. In return, Griego's hitman Alan (Zoren) kills Don Miguel, abducts his step-granddaughter and challenges Aguila to a final showdown in what he calls a duel.

== Cast ==
- Eddie Garcia as Ramon Aguila
- Zoren Legaspi as Alan
- Bernard Bonnin as Griego
- Luis Gonzales as Don Miguel
- Johnny Vicar as Mayor Pineda
- Allyzon Lualhati as Camille
- Teddy Chiu as Cheng
- Alex David as Tesano
- Raymond Tan as Domingo

== Home media ==
Duwelo was released on VHS in 1996 by Regal Home Video.
