= Crying Freeman =

Japanese manga series and its adaptations

- First tankōbon volume cover, featuring Yō Hinomura

クライング フリーマン (Kuraingu Furīman)
- Manga
- Written by: Kazuo Koike
- Illustrated by: Ryoichi Ikegami
- Published by: Shogakukan
- English publisher: NA: Viz Media (former); Dark Horse Comics
- Magazine: Big Comic Spirits
- Original run: 1986 – 1988
- Volumes: 9
- Original video animation
- Directed by: Daisuke Nishio (1–3); Shigeyasu Yamauchi (4–6)
- Produced by: Akira Sasaki; Naoko Takahashi; Tomiro Kuriyama
- Written by: Higashi Shimizu (1–3); Ryunosuke Ono (4–6)
- Music by: Hiroaki Yoshino
- Studio: Toei Animation
- Licensed by: NA: Streamline Pictures; A.D. Vision; Discotek Media; UK: Manga Entertainment
- Released: September 1988 – January 1994
- Runtime: 50 minutes (each)
- Episodes: 6
- icon

Crying Freeman (クライング フリーマン, Kuraingu Furīman) is a Japanese manga series written by Kazuo Koike and illustrated by Ryoichi Ikegami. Crying Freeman follows a Japanese assassin hypnotized and trained by the Chinese mafia (called the "108 Dragons") to serve as its agent and covered in a vast and complex dragon tattoo. A quiet but complicated killer, Freeman reflexively sheds tears after every killing as a sign of regret.

The manga was originally serialized by Shogakukan in its magazine Big Comic Spirits from 1986 to 1988. It was first published in North America by Viz Media in comic book form. Viz later republished the series in graphic novel form in two versions: an initial set and longer volumes that combined the initial volumes together, dubbed "Perfect Collections." From 2006 to 2007, the manga was republished by Dark Horse Comics in five volumes.

The story was adapted into an anime OVA by Toei Animation, released from 1988 to 1994. Crying Freeman has also been adapted into three live-action films: two 1990 Hong Kong films in Cantonese (Killer's Romance and The Dragon from Russia) and a 1995 French-Canadian production in English.

== Plot ==
Yō Hinomura, a Japanese potter, comes into the possession of some film showing an assassination by an agent of the 108 Dragons, a powerful Chinese mafia. Seeking its return, they kidnap him. Subjected to forced hypnosis, Yo is effectively brainwashed into acting as the 108 Dragons' principal assassin, but he can remember his past at the moment he kills, shedding a tear unconsciously each time. Because of this, he is given the codename "Crying Freeman".

One of his killings is witnessed by Emu Hino, a lonely and beautiful Japanese artist. Knowing he must kill her, she paints his portrait and waits for him to come. When he does so, she tells him that she is tired of being alone and wishes to end her life. She asks for a favor before he kills her—for him to have sex with her, so that she will not die as a virgin. He grants her wish but finds he cannot kill her and they fall in love. The killing she witnessed was of a yakuza boss, however, so the yakuza want to find her so that they can find the killer. One of the yakuza attempts to enter Emu's home and force her to disclose the name of the killer, critically injuring her. Freeman takes her to the hospital and tells her to meet him at Hinomura Kiln, where he intends to part with her. Instead, she accompanies him back to the 108 Dragons, where he tattoos her with tigers, and they marry.

The heads of the 108 Dragons decide to name Freeman as their heir. He is given the Chinese name Lóng Tài-Yáng, and Emu is renamed Hǔ Qīng-Lán, as both pass the tests given to them. It proves not as easy as that, however, as they must contend with challenges to the leadership from Bái-Yá Shàn, the granddaughter of the leaders of the 108 Dragons, and attempts to destroy the Dragons from other underground organizations.

== Characters ==
=== 108 Dragons ===
The 108 Dragons (百八竜（ハンドレッド・エイト・ドラゴン）, Handoreddo Eito Doragon) is a Chinese Mafia that rose to prominence in the 1970s. It holds numerous assets around the world, including its own nuclear submarine. As a rule in the organization, succession by blood inheritance is prohibited.

Yō Hinomura (火野村 窯, Hinomura Yō) / Crying Freeman (クライング フリーマン, Kuraingu Furīman) / Lóng Tàiyáng (龍太陽 (ロン・タイイァン), Ron Taiian; lit. "Dragon Sun")
Voiced by: Toshio Furukawa (Japanese); Stephen Tremblay (Manga); Steve Bulen (Streamline/ADV) (English)
Portrayed by: Mark Dacascos
The son of a famous potter and a rising pottery star himself. During a visit to America to showcase his works, a photographer hid secret pictures of the 108 Dragons in one of his pots. Yo found the photos and was asked by the Dragons to surrender them but refused. As retribution, Father Dragon had him kidnapped and put under hypnosis, as he was considered the perfect candidate to lead the 108 Dragons.
Yo was then trained by Mother Tiger in assassination techniques and martial arts. After his training was complete, he received a giant dragon tattoo covering his body. Because he cries in remorse for his victims after he snaps out of his trance (it seems later to just become habit due to the fact that he willingly takes on missions), he earned the name Crying Freeman. As Freeman, Yo possesses incredible agility and strength, and is considered the strongest man in the world. Each of his senses have been honed and sharpened and he is able to adapt to any situation. Initially shown to use guns, he comes to prefer daggers, which he can proficiently wield with both his hands and feet.
In addition to being the strongest man in the world, Lóng Tài-Yáng is also one of the most handsome, and no woman has been able to resist his charms, which he takes full sexual advantage of even after Emu Hino becomes his wife.
Emu Hino (日野 絵霧, Hino Emu) / Hǔ Qīnglán (虎清蘭 (フー・チンラン), Fū Chinran; lit. "Tiger Pure-Orchid")
Voiced by: Chiharu Kataishi (Japanese); Edita Brychta (Manga); Edie Mirman (Streamline/ADV) (English)
Portrayed by: Julie Condra
A young artist whose father had died; Emu Hino was once a rich girl whose wealth disappeared with his death. All that was left to her was the old family mansion. One day, she witnesses Freeman chasing and killing a Japanese crime boss in Hong Kong, after which she asks his name, to which he only replied "Yo". When she sees his tears after the murder, she is intrigued and immediately falls in love with him.
Soon, she becomes witness to Freeman's murder of Shudo Shimazaki, the head of the Hakushin Society, which causes both the police and the yakuza to tail her. She returns home only to find that Freeman is waiting for her. Emu then requests that Yo take her virginity before killing her, to which he complies. Later, Yo cannot bring himself to kill her as he has fallen in love with her, and the two eventually escape to Hong Kong. At first, Mother Tiger disapproves of her, thinking that Emu was weak, but Emu's strong will and resolve earns her the respect of the 108 Dragons. She is given the name Hǔ Qīng-Lán by Grandfather Dragon and is married to Freeman, who is renamed Lóng Tài-Yáng. Emu has a giant tiger tattooed on her back and two cubs on her torso for the children that she and Yo cannot have.
In the middle of the series, Emu gains possession of the legendary cursed katana Muramasa from an assassin who targets Freeman. She travels to the Kowloon Walled City to learn swordsmanship skills from an unlicensed dentist named Gouken Ishida. Despite being crafted during a time women were not allowed to wield swords, the Muramasa recognizes her as its true owner. As one of the leaders of the 108 Dragons, Emu is more resourceful and cleverer than even her husband, and as fearless as he is in the face of opposition. The first true owner of the Muramasa, she is quite dangerous as a sword master.
Hǔ Fēnglíng (虎風鈴 (フウ・フンリン), Fū Funrin; lit. "Tiger Wind Chime")
Voiced by: Nobuyo Tsuda (Japanese); Rosemary Miller (Manga); Catherine Battistone (Streamline) (English)
Portrayed by: Ivy Ng
Also known as Mother Tiger, she is the former female head of the 108 Dragons. She took on the task of training Freeman, honing him into the best assassin in the world and the strongest man alive. Like Emu Hino, she has a Tiger tattooed on her body, which signifies her position in the 108 Dragons. She has adopted Freeman as a son and Emu as a daughter-in-law. While skeptical of Emu at first, she came to recognize her strength. Grandmother Tiger had a son in violation of the 108 Dragons' rule that the leaders are sterilized to prevent them from having children, as the organization survives on individual talent and not on heritage or legacies. Mother Tiger came to regret her decision as her son became a cold-blooded killer even in his early youth and was exiled to a remote island.
Bái-Yá Shàn (白牙扇 (ペーヤーサン), Bēyāsan; lit. "White Ivory Fan")
Voiced by: Dump Matsumoto (Japanese); Debora Weston (Manga); Barbara Goodson (Streamline) (English)
The granddaughter of Father Dragon and Mother Tiger who challenges Freeman for the leadership of the 108 Dragons shortly after his succession. She attempts a coup d'état immediately after Freeman and Emu's wedding, with the aid of Camorra and Elder Mercury, one of the Ten Planets who was loyal to her father. Bái-Yá Shàn is defeated by Freeman and subsequently forgiven and accepted back into the 108 Dragons, from then on becoming his faithful and devoted "little sister", acting as a personal maid and bodyguard for her older brother and his wife. A giant woman in both aspects of height and weight, Bái-Yá Shàn is practically invulnerable to most attacks, as she has survived multiple gunshot wounds. She often goes into missions naked, which is quite nauseating for her opponents. Her weapons of choice are two butterfly swords, but she also likes to keep an automatic rifle handy. Bái-Yá Shàn is very emotional, openly crying in moments of fear, doubt, and sorrow; at times, she still seems rather like a little girl despite her age.
Huáng Dé-Yuán (黄徳源 (ホァン・デユァン), Hoan Deyuan) / Koh Tokugen (in Streamline dub)
Voiced by: Ryusei Nakao (Japanese); Vincent Marzello (Manga); Jeff Winkless (Streamline) (English)
Portrayed by: Byron Mann
A member of 108 Dragons and assistant to Freeman on his missions, who first worked with him after his kidnapping and hypnosis. After Freeman forces him to assist in helping save a critically wounded Emu Hino, he realizes that the two are meant for each other and defends Freeman's actions to Mother Tiger. After Freeman takes over leadership of the 108 Dragons, Huáng Dé-Yuán becomes his right-hand man. He dies from wounds sustained while fighting the Camorra assassin Kitche and is buried at sea after Freeman defeats her.

=== Hakushin Society ===
Shudo Shimazaki (島崎秋堂, Shimazaki Shūdō)
Voiced by: Nobuo Yana (Japanese); Burt Kwouk (Manga); Michael Forest (Streamline) (English)
Portrayed by: Mako
Leader of the Hakushin Society (白真会, Hakushin-kai), a yakuza that has a workforce of 26,000 men across Japan. His organization controls all aspects of organized crime except drug trafficking. Knowing that the 108 Dragons have sent Freeman to assassinate him in order to fully infiltrate Japan's criminal underground, Shimazaki goes to a police precinct for protection and to give vital information on the Chinese Mafia but is eventually shot in the head by a masked Freeman. Emu Hino is immediately marked as a witness when she immediately notices the tears flowing through Freeman's mask as he runs away.
Ryuji Hanada (花田竜二, Hanada Ryūji)
Voiced by: Takaya Hashi (Japanese); Bob Sessions (Manga); Kerrigan Mahan (Streamline) (English)
Portrayed by: Masaya Kato
The second most powerful member of the Hakushin Society, he takes over the group after Shimazaki is assassinated by Freeman. Nicknamed "The Blade" (カミソリ, Kamisori), Ryuji attempts to kidnap Emu with the tacit support of the police. He is wounded by Freeman but survives and manages to see his face. Ryuji is later on assassinated by Freeman and Huang.
Kimie Hanada (花田君江, Hanada Kimie)
Voiced by: Masako Katsuki (Japanese); Liza Ross (Manga); Catherine Battistone (Streamline) (English)
Portrayed by: Yoko Shimada
The wife of Ryuji Hanada and the most powerful woman in the Hakushin Society hierarchy. Following Ryuji's death, she ensnares Detective Nitta by managing to get compromising photos of them together taken, securing his cooperation in her scheme to locate Emu and avenge Ryuji's death, although she and Nitta quickly become lovers. Kimie and Nitta are stabbed in the chest by Freeman, but their lives are spared when Freeman forces them to accept his alibi that Yo Hinomura and Emu Hino committed suicide after killing Shimazaki over a past dispute. Later on, Kimie becomes a follower of Kumagaism and assists its leader Naiji Kumaga in his plot to seize control of the 108 Dragons by creating a clone of Freeman. Tasked by Kumaga to sleep with Freeman in order to learn his sexual habits and patterns to then pass them on to the clone, she subsequently falls in love with him and betrays Kumaga.
Nitta (新田)
Voiced by: Yusaku Yara (Japanese); Bob Sherman (Manga); Michael McConnohie (Streamline) (English)
Portrayed by: Tchéky Karyo
A police detective assigned to interrogate Emu after identifying Freeman as "Yo" during his assassination of Shudo Shimazaki. He becomes romantically involved with Kimie Hanada after she blackmails him for his cooperation to locate Freeman and Emu. He and Kimie are forced by Freeman to tell the press of Yo Hinomura and Emu Hino's suicide in exchange for their lives. Later in the series, Nitta joins Kimie in becoming a follower of Kumagaism. When he learns that Kimie betrayed Kumaga by falling in love with Freeman, Nitta holds her hostage and demands for the 108 Dragons to send them back to Japan. His demands fall on deaf ears, as members of the 108 Dragons quickly subdue and kill him.

=== Camorra ===
Don Carleone (ドン・カルレオーネ, Don Karureōne)
Voiced by: Banjō Ginga (Japanese); Peter Marinker (Manga); Michael Forest (Streamline) (English)
Leader of the Camorra (カモラ, Kamora), one of the oldest and most powerful Italian Mafias in the world. With the aid of Bái-Yá Shàn and Elder Mercury, Don Carleone instigates a coup d'état to overthrow the 108 Dragons. When Don Carlone has his subordinates kill Elder Mercury and attempt to wipe out the entire hierarchy of the 108 Dragons, Freeman swiftly kills him, effectively crippling the Camorra.
Kitche (キッチェ)
Voiced by: Toshiko Fujita (Japanese); Shelley Thompson (Manga); Diane Michelle (Streamline) (English)
A female assassin of the Camorra and Don Carleone's lover who has excellent marksmanship with a .223 Calico. Of African descent, she disguises herself as a blond-haired white woman and stabs a 108 Dragons subordinate to force him to leave a trail for her to follow all the way to Freeman. Wearing a special titanium body suit that blocks knife attacks and emits a 50,000-volt current that shocks anyone who attempts to stab her, Kitche severely wounds Huáng Dé-Yuán so he can lead her to Freeman. After killing Huáng, Kitche engages Freeman in a knife fight on the 108 Dragons' submarine, but when she lures him into the water and electrocutes him with her body suit, she realizes that Freeman has slit her wrist and the seawater is accelerating her blood loss. Freeman kisses Kitche before she dies and sinks to the bottom of the ocean.

=== Askari ===
Jigon (ジゴン)
Voiced by: Daisuke Gōri (Japanese); Seán Barrett (Manga); Mike Reynolds (Streamline) (English)
Leader of the Askari Group (アスカリ, Asukari) (also known as the "Horn of Africa" or "African Tusk" (アフリカの牙, Afurika no Kiba)), a nomadic terrorist group that instigates riots and political uprisings in the African continent. Naming himself after an African god, Jigon is a master of an onzil called the "Bird's Head". After killing Jigon's right-hand-man Shikebaro, Freeman follows Shikebaro's mistress Miranda towards Jigon's hideout before he plants a foot knife on Jigon's head. Jigon pulls out the knife and kills Miranda with it before succumbing to his wound.
Shikebaro (シケバロ)
Voiced by: Norio Wakamoto (Japanese); Gregory Snegoff (Streamline) (English)
Jigon's second-in-command in the Askari Group. Highly skilled in using the chakram, Shikebaro has personally assassinated 30 European and African VIPs. Freeman proposes for the 108 Dragons to eliminate the Askari Group after thwarting an airliner hijacking by one of Shikebaro's henchmen, but the elders vote against him. After the Askari Group sends an assassin to wipe out the elders, Freeman follows the trail of the scent of Shikebaro's ambergris musk cologne and kills him outside his hotel.
Bugnug (Anteater) (バグナグ, Bagunagu) / Dark Eyes (ダークアイ, Dāku Ai)
Voiced by: Yoshiko Sakakibara (Japanese); Nicolette McKenzie (Manga); Melanie MacQueen (Streamline) (English)
The secret leader of the Askari group, Bugnug is an exotic and muscular African beauty specializing in the mambele. She controls the organization through her lieutenants Jigon and Shikebaro. After Freeman kills Jigon and Shikebaro, Bugnug launches a surprise attack on him. Despite losing a lot of blood, Freeman wins her over in the middle of the fight, resulting in a truce and halt to the fighting between the 108 Dragons and Askari. Bugnug saves Freeman's life through a blood transfusion, as they both share the same blood type. Bugnug falls in love with Freeman, who gives her the name "Dark Eyes", although she knows that he is already married. Since then, the Askari have been a valuable ally to the 108 Dragons, and Bugnug occasionally assists Freeman on assassination missions.

=== Kumagaism ===
Naiji Kumaga (熊我内耐, Kumaga Naiji)
Voiced by: Ichirō Nagai (Japanese); Douglas Blackwell (Manga); Mike Reynolds (Streamline) (English)
Leader of the Kumagaism (熊我教, Kumaga-kyō) cult. He has professional wrestler Oshu Tohgoku abduct Freeman to clone him to make the 108 Dragons part of his cult and arm them with 1,000 Type 100 submachine guns to take over Japan. Kumaga also has Kimie seduce Freeman for his clone to learn more about him. Little does Kumaga know that Kimie allows Freeman to switch places with his clone, letting Freeman play along with Kumaga's scheme until he traps Kumaga in the 108 Dragons' headquarters. Kumaga recites the "curse of the bear" chant to immobilize Freeman, but he is decapitated by Emu and the Muramasa.
Oshu Tohgoku (雄首冬獄, Oshu Tōgoku)
Voiced by: Ryūzaburō Ōtomo (Japanese); Bill Bailey (Manga); Tony Clay (Streamline) (English)
A championship pro wrestler, Oshu is a massive, powerful man, standing over two meters tall. It is implied that Oshu secretly assists the Hakushin Society with its killings, and fights with a large dagger designed in the sword breaker style. Oshu is also a member of Kumagaism, and is instrumental in Kumaga's plot to kidnap Freeman to clone him, nearly killing Bugnug after capturing and raping her. During Freeman's captivity, he comes to develop respect for him, and does not reveal that Freeman had successfully converted Kimie to his side and was posing as the Freeman clone. In a death match with Freeman, his superior size and strength are defeated by Freeman's agility. After Bugnug hits him with a thrown knife as the coup de grâce, Oshu asks that the 108 Dragons adopt his family before committing suicide.

=== Kidnappers Organization (K.O.) ===
Nina Heaven (ニーナ・ヘブン, Nīna Hebun)
Voiced by: Gara Takashima (Japanese); Pamela West (Manga); Wendee Lee (Streamline) (English)
A blond-haired woman who leads the Kidnappers Organization (キッドナッパーズ, Kiddonappāzu). She first learned about Freeman a few years ago during one of his earlier assassinations at a hotel, where she worked as a receptionist and took photos of him during the hit. Ever since that day, she has been sexually obsessed with Freeman. Ten years later, Nina uses the K.O. to lure him in by kidnapping a prominent family in Los Angeles' Chinatown. She succeeds in capturing Freeman, but she is unable to have sex with him due to his lack of interest in her. Meanwhile, Emu leads a mission to rescue her husband and the hostages, as well as to wipe out K.O. for its audacity to attack the 108 Dragons. Nina is killed in the aftermath of this incident. (Note: In the manga, Nina is decapitated by a grenade during the assault. In the anime, Nina attempts to shoot Freeman, but he stabs her in the heart before throwing her off a cliff.)
Larry Buck (ラリー・バック, Rarī Bakku)
Voiced by: Seizō Katō (Japanese); Graydon Gould (Manga); Wally Burr (Streamline) (English)
A large, muscular, American ex-soldier with a tattoo of the Japanese deity, Kishimojin, on his back who serves as the leader of the ex-Green Berets in the Kidnappers Organization. During his tour of duty in the Vietnam War, he was somehow rendered impotent. Within K.O., Larry has found a purpose in life to create a place where people like himself can belong to - a country for soldiers. Larry is pitted against Freeman in a duel to the death by Nina and is eventually slain by the assassin.
Lucky Boyd
Voiced by: Kōji Totani (Japanese); Allan Wenger (Manga); Gregory Snegoff (Streamline) (English)
A member of the Kidnappers Organization. He is killed by Bái-Yá Shàn during the 108 Dragons' assault on K.O.'s island.

=== Others ===
Boss Wong
Voiced by: Osamu Saka (Japanese); John Blythe (Manga); Simon Prescott (Streamline) (English)
Leader of the Wong family, which has controlled Chinatown in Los Angeles for over 60 years. When the Kidnappers Organization abducts his first daughter and her family, Wong calls Freeman to rescue them.
Wonshaku
Voiced by: Mika Doi (Japanese); Shelley Thompson (Manga); Diane Michelle (Streamline) (English)
The second daughter of Boss Wong. Wonshaku works for The Pentagon in the computer strategy division. Because of this, she is called upon by Wong to assist Freeman in learning more about the Kidnappers Organization. Wonshaku is wounded in an ambush staged by the K.O.; this attack reveals the fact that the K.O.'s true target is Freeman. While Freeman is captured by the K.O., Wonshaku plants a virus in the K.O.'s mainframe before flying to their island to infiltrate their base and recover her sister's family, but her cover is blown when her niece Woh Pei recognizes her.
Tsunaike (綱池)
Voiced by: Bin Shimada (Japanese); Robert Glenister (Manga); John Swasey (ADV) (English)
A young wakagashira (underboss) of a yakuza group, Tsunaike harbors ambitions to eventually become the leader of all crime syndicates of Asia. His plan to do this involves igniting a gang war between the yakuza and the 108 Dragons, then taking over their operations with the help of his contacts in the Russian Connection, a Russian mafia. Tsunaike is assisted in his efforts by Tanya, a beautiful Russian assassin who is also his lover. Attacking both yakuza and members of the 108 Dragons, Tsunaike gradually becomes bolder and eventually sets a trap for Freeman. However, he and Tanya severely underestimate Freeman's abilities as an assassin, and both are killed.
Tanya
Voiced by: Megumi Terase (Japanese); Susan Sheridan (Manga); Sian Taylor (ADV) (English)
A beautiful Russian woman with short, bobbed hair and pale skin, Tanya is a highly skilled assassin affiliated with the Russian Connection. Originally sent to aid Tsunaike in his efforts to take over the yakuza operations in Japan, Tanya eventually becomes Tsunaike's lover and faithful follower. She takes part in several missions to eliminate high-level yakuza and 108 Dragons leaders on Tsunaike's behalf. When Tsunaike sets a trap to kill Freeman, Tanya challenges the assassin to a duel and is killed.
Choko Tateoka (舘岡眺湖, Tateoka Chōko)
Voiced by: Kaneto Shiozawa (Japanese); William Dufris (Manga); Vic Mignogna (ADV) (English)
A master assassin nicknamed the "Troubadour of Darkness" (闇の吟遊詩人, Yami no Gin'yūshijin). Tateoka ambushes Freeman with his bladed getas laced with poison. Despite being wounded and poisoned, Freeman kills Tateoka by shoving his head under a light post.

== Media ==
=== Manga ===
The manga was published in nine volumes, from 29 March 1986 to 1988 (Weekly Big Comic Spirits 1986 #7 to 1988 #21).

=== Original video animation ===
The manga was adapted into a six-part anime OVA series by Toei Animation that was released from September 1988 to January 1994.

An English dub of the OVA was produced and distributed on VHS by Manga Entertainment in the United Kingdom. In the United States, Streamline Pictures produced an English dub of the first five episodes, which were released by Orion Home Video on individual VHS tapes from January 1994 to February 1995. Streamline also planned an English dub of the sixth episode, but Orion declined to have it produced. Between 2003 and 2004, A.D. Vision (ADV) released all six episodes to DVD across three separate sets and a combined set entitled Crying Freeman: The Complete Collection. ADV used the Streamline dub for the first five episodes and produced an English dub for the sixth, with Streamline leads Steve Bulen and Edie Mirman reprising their roles as Freeman and Emu. Discotek Media reissued the Complete Collection boxed set on February 22, 2011. In 2023, Discotek released the OVA to Blu-ray with the Manga and Streamline/ADV dubs.

No.	Title	English title(s)	Original release date
1	"Crying Freeman"; Transliteration: "Kuraingu Furīman" (Japanese: クライング フリーマン)	"Portrait of a Killer" (Note: Title translations taken from the Discotek Media Blu-ray release.)	September 1988
Emu Hino, a lonely and beautiful Japanese artist witnesses a Chinese man killing three men, then sees his eyes well up with tears. He introduces himself as Yō, then leaves, but she later sees the same man assassinate Shudo Shimazaki, leader of the Japanese Hakushin yakuza as he was concerned about the distribution of narcotics in Japan by the 108 Dragons, a powerful Chinese mafia. She gives Yō's name to the police, but when Yō arrives later at her house to kill her, he grants her wish to make love to her first. During the night, yakuza led by Ryuji "The Blade" Hanada, enters Emu's home to force her to disclose the name of the killer, critically injuring her. Freeman and Koh kill the yakuza and shoot Kimie Hanada, then take Emu to the hospital, telling her to meet him later at his family's Hinomura Pottery. There he tells her the story of how the 108 Dragons turned him into the assassin, Crying Freeman. He takes revenge on the yakuza and then is severely punished by the 108 Dragons for refusing to kill Emu. He implements an elaborate plan for them to appear to be killed in the destruction of the Hinomura Pottery. During the confrontation, he stabs both Hanada and Detective Nitta near their hearts but spares their lives on the condition that they spread a story of Yō and Emu's deaths.
2	"Fusei Kakurei" (Japanese: 風声鶴唳)	"The Enemy Within" (UK) "Shades of Death Part I" (US)	August 1989
In Hong Kong, Yō and Emu marry in a Chinese wedding ceremony and are given the new names Long Tai Yang and Hu Qing Lan. When they are nominated as the organization's successors, Freeman is attacked by a disguised assassin indicating a traitor within their ranks. They travel to Macau in search of evidence and track down Chen, a mask-maker, but Chen is killed before they can trace his employers. Later, in the rice fields, granddaughter Bai Ya Shan arrives, demanding leadership of the 108 Dragons. She kidnaps her grandparents and takes them to Wolon Island, daring Freeman to rescue them. Freeman and Koh suspects Don Carleone's Camorra Organization is behind Bai Ya Shan. Freeman lets himself be captured and beaten and finds that 108 Dragons elder member Planet Mercury is behind Bai Ya Shan, and is supported by Camorra's Organization. After they reveal themselves, Freeman attacks and kills them all. He then defeats Bai Ya Shan and establishes his control over the organization. Later Don Carleone's female companion Kiche seeks revenge for the Camorra Organization. She shoots Koh and follows him to Freeman then engages Freeman in a duel with knives on the deck of the 108 Dragons submarine. Freeman kills her, but Koh eventually dies from his bullet wound and is subsequently buried at sea.
3	"Martial Vows"; Transliteration: "Hiyoku Renri" (Japanese: 比翼連理)	"Retribution" (UK) "Shades of Death Part II" (US)	May 1990
As a test of her fortitude, Emu is kidnapped by 108 Dragon operatives, tortured and threatened with rape, but she does not break, confirming her position beside Freeman. While flying to Japan with Bai Ya Shan, Freeman's plane is hijacked by Askari agents, however after landing, Freeman and Bai Ya Shan kill the revolutionary terrorist hijackers. They follow a survivor stabbed with a tracking device to Shikebaro's base and return to their headquarters and discuss their strategy. During the 108 Dragon meeting a gunman burst in and kills the leaders named after the Ten Planets as they sacrifice themselves to save Freeman. The 108 Dragons hold a funeral ceremony for the dead leaders, including an empty coffin for Freeman. Freeman then poses as a hair stylist and seduces Miranda, Shikebaro's lover and then kills him. Freeman then follows her to Jigon's mansion and kills him but not before Jigon kills Miranda. As he leaves, Freeman is attacked by Bugnug, the real leader of the Askari. He wounds, but does not kill her, and they form an alliance, and he calls her Dark Eyes. Meanwhile, Emu acquires the ancient Muramasa, the cursed Sword of Darkness. She and Bai Ya Shan take it to master swordsman Professor Gouken Ishida at Kowloon Castle, to teach her how to use it if it accepts her. A local gang, the Seiraitan threaten them, but she delays them until Freeman arrives, the dragon and tiger united and the Seiraitan accept them as leaders.
4	"Oshu Tohgoku" (Japanese: 雄首冬獄)	"The Impersonator" (UK) "A Taste of Revenge" (US)	September 1991
After a shoot-out, Dark Eyes is confronted by the massive and powerful Oshu Tohgoku who rapes her and dumps her in the sea. Freeman finds and rescues her and plots his revenge on Tohgoku and the Hakushin. He challenges Tohgoku at a public wrestling match but loses. The Hakushin take him to their headquarters where Master Naiji has a clone prepared to replace him at 108 Dragons. Kimie Hanada is ordered to sleep with Freeman to reveal his secrets, but he convinces her to support him instead. Freeman then switches places with his clone who is killed by Tohgoku on Naiji's orders. Thinking Freeman is the clone, Naiji sends him with Tohgoku and Kimie to take control of 108 Dragons. Naji then travels to 108 Dragons headquarters, but Freeman reveals that he's still alive and in control. Sensing defeat, Naiji invokes a spell, causing everyone except Emu to collapse, and she then uses the Muramasa to kill him. Tohgoku challenges Freeman to a match which Freeman wins, but he leaves it to Dark Eyes to take her revenge and deliver the killing stroke with her throwing blade.
5	"Kishimojin of the Battlefield"; Transliteration: "Senjō no Kishimojin" (Japanese: 戦場の鬼子母神)	"The Hostages" (UK) "Abduction in Chinatown" (US)	October 1992
In Los Angeles Chinatown, Mr Wong asks Freeman for help to retrieve his kidnapped daughter, son-in-law and granddaughter after already paying the ransom to the Kidnapper Organization (K.O.). Mr Wong's second daughter, Wonshaku, helps by accessing Pentagon databases to gather information. When an attempt is made on their lives, Freeman suspects he is the real target and takes the place of a traitor in the Wong group who is picked up by a skyhook. He is taken to K.O. headquarters and greeted by Larry Buck, also known as Kishimoji. Freeman meets Nina Heaven who declares her desire for him and wants him as a partner, but he refuses. Meanwhile, Wonshaku introduces a virus into the K.O. network and Bai Ya Shan lands from the sea to rescue the hostages, but unfortunately, she is captured. Separately, Wonshaku tries to free the hostages by impersonating a US Colonel, but she is also captured. To entertain her troops, Nina arranges a fight between Freeman and Larry Buck, after first inciting her troops with an erotic dance. Emu and Dark Eyes infiltrate the camp to rescue everyone, and their plan is successful. As they leave Nina tries to shoot Freeman, but he kills her while giving her a parting kiss.
6	"Final: The Light in the Darkness"; Transliteration: "Kanketsu-hen: Mumyō ryū sha" (Japanese: 完結篇 無明流射)	"The Russian Connection"	January 1994
Russian mafia boss Nicholaiev and Japanese yakuza Tsunaike plan to cut out the 108 Dragons trade and Nicholaiev makes an offer to Tanya to help him. Meanwhile, Freeman sees a woman pass in a car he remembers from his past. When Freeman learns that 108 Dragons business is being squeezed, he travels to Japan. Japanese Boss Watajima raises his concern about offending the 108 Dragons with Tsunaike. Meanwhile, an unknown group carries out strikes against the Japanese yakuza, and the leaders suspect 108 Dragons are responsible. They consider settling with them, but a Tsunaike accuses the old leaders of cowardice. They agree to hire assassin Choko Tateoka to kill Freeman, while Tsunaike privately hopes to take over following the bloodbath that would ensue. Tateoka ambushes Freeman but fails and is killed. Freeman confronts his contacts in Japan who deny dealing with the Russians. Tsunaike implements his plan with Tanya to wipe out the yakuza leaders and blame it on the 108 Dragons. Freeman agrees to meet Tsunaike on the docks, even though he suspects a trap. When the 108 Dragons submarine destroys a ship arriving in port with 3,000 Russian mafia men, Freeman goes after Tsunaike, killing Tanya first. He finds Tsunaike holding the woman from his past as a hostage, they fight and Tsunaike is killed, freeing the innocent woman who does not recognize Freeman.
