= Heroes of Shaolin =

1977 Hong Kong film by William Chang

- Written by: William Chang; Chang Hsin Yee
- Release date: 1977
- Country: Hong Kong

Heroes of Shaolin (Chinese: 大武士與小票客) aka Heroes of the Wild is the Americanized title for the 1977 Hong Kong kung fu epic Daai miu si yue siu piu haak. Filmed in Taiwan, the two-part story was directed by William Chang and co-written by Chang and relatively unknown kung-fu film writer Chang Hsin Yee. Like many kung fu movies from the late 1970s, the main theme of the film focuses on revenge, but the story holds a unique twist that sets it apart from many other films of the era. The film is set in the Yuan Dynasty in the 13th century.

== Plot details ==
Part one opens with a young boy and his father flying a kite on a secluded beach. The father is soon confronted by a past enemy, who demands a rematch after an embarrassing defeat. The young boy is horror-stricken as, after his father's defeat, the father takes his own life before the young boy's eyes and rushes to avenge his death. The challenger easily defeats the boy, but rather than kill again, he allows the boy to journey with him, offering to teach the boy in martial arts so that he may one day take appropriate revenge. The boy keeps training under him; and through a series of events, the boy has his revenge but not in the way he intended.

== Cast ==
The cast stars Yuen Biao as Sword & Knife man, Chen Sing as Tu Tashan, Jang Lee Hwang as Tien Lung and other supporting actors.
