= Hell's Wind Staff =

1979 Hong Kong film by Lu Chin-ku

- DVD cover
- Directed by: Lu Chin-ku; Tony Wong
- Written by: Huang Yu-liang; Tony Wong; Thomas Tang
- Story by: Tony Wong
- Produced by: Tony Wong; Hwang Yen-kwang
- Starring: Hwang Jang Lee; Meng Yuen-man; Mang Hoi; Kwan Yung-moon
- Cinematography: Ma Goon-wa
- Edited by: Poon Hung-yiu
- Music by: Frankie Chan
- Distributed by: Yuk Long Movies
- Release date: 5 July 1979
- Running time: 85 min.
- Country: Hong Kong
- Language: Cantonese

Hell's Wind Staff (released in the United Kingdom as Hell'z Windstaff or also known as The Dragon and the Tiger Kids.) is a 1979 Hong Kong martial arts film directed by Lu Chin-ku, and also written, produced, and directed by Tony Wong based on an edition of the comic book Oriental Heroes (Chinese: 龍虎門). It stars Hwang Jang Lee, Meng Yuen-man, Mang Hoi and Kwan Yung-moon.

== Plot ==
Two young kung fu experts are terrorized by an evil warlord whose weapon is known as the Hell's Wind Staff. With the aid of an old rival of the warlord, they train in the Dragon Hands and the Rowing Oar to face off against the deadly Hell's Wind Staff.

== Cast ==
- Hwang Jang Lee – Lu Shan-tu
- Meng Yuen-man – Tiger Wang
- Mang Hoi – Stone Dragon
- Kwan Yung-moon – Shek
- Jason Pai Piao – Ching Wan-li
- Yip Fei-yang – Tiao Erh
- Lau Hok-nin – Master Wang Fu-hu
- Baan Yun-sang – Snake Fighter
- Wong Mei – Master Liu Chia-wen
- Hsu Hsia – Cousin Hsu
- Cheung Hei – Older Fisherman #1
- Chui Fat – Beats Up Unwilling Fishermen
- Gam Tin-chue – Older Fisherman #2
- Ho Kei-chong
- Kei Ho-chiu
- Lee Chu-hwa – Muscles
- Lin Ke-ming
- Lo Wai – Hsu's Student
- Tai San – Recruits Fishermen
- Wang Han-chen – Uncle Fu
- Yeung Sai-gwan

== Action choreographers ==
- Hsu Hsia
- Corey Yuen
- Chin Yuet-sang
- Yuen Shun-yee

== DVD release ==
The DVD was released in Region 2 in the United Kingdom on 24 February 2003, distributed by Eastern Heroes.

In the US, it was released on DVD by Xenon Video (2003) in 2.35:1 ratio, original language (Cantonese with Chinese and English subtitles burned in); the ending where the villain gets shoved into a tree stump and his legs yanked apart is truncated. The World Video release (2001) is full screen, English dubbed and features the full ending.
