= Catherine Battistone =

American voice actress

- Other names: Catherine Luciani
- Occupation: Voice actress
- Years active: 1982-2008

Catherine Battistone is an American voice actress who has provided voices for several anime titles and video games.

== Biography ==
She is well known for having done the voice of Alpha 6 in the 1997 Power Rangers series, Power Rangers: Turbo.

Battistone has also made minor appearances on-screen, in TV shows including Murder, She Wrote, Simon & Simon, and Tales from the Darkside, and movies including Problem Child.

== Personal life ==
She officially retired from voice acting in 2008.

== Selected filmography ==
=== Anime ===
- 8 Man After - Sam O'Conner
- Armitage: Dual Matrix - Additional Voices
- Barefoot Gen - Gen Nakaoka
- Crying Freeman - 'Lady' Kimie Hanada
- Dinozaurs - Diamond Ryugu
- Fushigi Yūgi - Taiisukun/Narrator
- Gate Keepers - Youko Ono
- Metal Fighter Miku - Buddhist Nun, Masayo Harajuku
- Outlaw Star - Additional Voices
- Space Adventure Cobra - Sandra
- The Twelve Kingdoms - Circus Master
- Tweeny Witches - Grand Master of Witches
- Vandread - Captain Magno Vivian
- Windaria - Lunarian Queen
- Witch Hunter Robin - Methuselah
- Wolf's Rain - Old Prisoner
- Zenki - Saki Enno

=== Live-action ===
- Power Rangers: Turbo - Alpha 6 (voice)
- Power Rangers in Space - Alpha 6 (first episode only, voice)
- Power Rangers: Lightspeed Rescue - Arachnor (voice)
- Power Rangers Time Force - Alpha 6

=== Video games ===
- Inherit the Earth: Quest for the Orb
- Jade Cocoon: Story of the Tamamayu
- Lords of Everquest - Additional Voices
- Heroes of Might and Magic 3 - Catherine Ironfist
- Might and Magic IV: Clouds of Xeen
- Might and Magic V: Darkside of Xeen
- Might and Magic IX
- Star Trek: 25th Anniversary Enhanced - Narrator
- Star Trek: Judgment Rites - Narrator
