= Shaolin Plot =

1977 Hong Kong film by Huang Feng

- Hong Kong DVD cover
- Chinese: 四大門派
- Directed by: Huang Feng
- Written by: Huang Feng
- Produced by: Raymond Chow
- Starring: Sammo Hung; Casanova Wong; Chan Sing; James Tien; Kam Kong
- Distributed by: Golden Harvest
- Release date: 1977
- Running time: 103 minutes
- Country: Hong Kong
- Language: Mandarin

Shaolin Plot (traditional Chinese: 四大門派; simplified Chinese: 四大门派) is a 1977 Hong Kong film directed by Huang Feng with Sammo Hung in his first starring role and as action director. Huang had been Hung's mentor. Filming took place in South Korea.

== Cast ==
- James Tien as Little Tiger
- Chan Sing as Prince Daglen
- Casanova Wong as Warrior Monk #1 - Kicker (Intro)
- Sammo Hung as Renegade Monk
- Kam Kong as Monk Pu Hui
- Guan Shan as Ku Cheng Fung
- Kwon Young Moon as Warrior Monk #2 - Buddhist Fist
- Mang Hoi as Assassin Beggar (Cameo)
- Yen Shi Kwan as Renegade Monk's Men
- Fung Hak-on as Renegade Monk's Men
- Chin Yuet Sang as Renegade Monk's Men
- Chung Fat as Monk
- Peter Chan as Traitor
- Mars as Monk (as Fo Sing)
- Billy Chan as Monk
- Austin Wai as Monk
- Jeong Jin Hwa as Monk
- Kim Young Il as Monk
- Jo Chun as Monk
- Kwon Il Soo as Monk
- Park Hui Jin as Monk
- Yuen Wah as Soldier
- Yuen Biao as School Fighter
- Lam Ching Ying as Soldier
- Stephen Tung as Soldier
