= Hitman in the Hand of Buddha =

1981 Hong Kong-South Korean film by Hwang Jang-lee and Park Yun-kyo

- 借刀殺人
- Directed by: Hwang Jang-lee; Park Yun-kyo
- Written by: Park Yun-kyo
- Produced by: Hwang Jang-lee; Han Sang-hun
- Starring: Hwang Jang-lee; Eddy Ko; Fan Mei-sheng; Tino Wong Cheung
- Distributed by: Hwang Jang-lee Production Company
- Release dates: 17 April 1981 (Hong Kong); 3 May 1981 (South Korea)
- Running time: 91 minutes (Hong Kong version); 81 minutes (Korean version); 72 minutes (German version)
- Countries: Hong Kong; South Korea
- Languages: Cantonese; Korean; Mandarin

Hitman in the Hand of Buddha (Chinese: 借刀殺人; Korean: 인무가인 Hindi: बुद्ध के हाथ में हत्यारा Tibetan: སངས་རྒྱས་ཀྱི་ལག་ཏུ་ཧིཊ་མན།) is a 1981 martial arts film directed and produced by Hwang Jang-lee in his directorial debut, who also starred in the lead role, and co-directed by Park Yun-kyo. The film is co-produced by Hong Kong and South Korea.

== Plot ==
Wong Chin arrives in a small town to visit his sister and brother-in-law and quickly dispatches of some local thugs who are intent on robbing people. His unfaithful, inept brother-in-law, who works at a rice shop, frequents a local brothel. On the wrong occasion, he is drug out of said brothel, then beaten and strung up by thugs from a rival rice shop. Wong Chin steps in to defend his brother-in-law, in which case he discovers that his brother-in-law is cheating on his sister. Despite this revelation, the naïve sister remains faithful to her husband. Wong Chin goes to work in the rice shop and when the thugs return to wreak havoc, they are once again dispatched of with ease. When the thugs are fed up with frequent these beatings, they call on Mr. Shen, the local hired killer, and offer him a deal to fight Wong Chin. Shan Hao, the real Mr. Shen, overhears the plan and he steps in to give the imposter a lesson he won’t forget. Soon a deal is struck for Wong Chin’s life and Wong Chin is invited to dinner by the rival gang, soon realizing that it’s a trap, Wong Chin easily defeats Mr. Shen and his “snake fist” without breaking a sweat.

In a related sub-plot, Beggar Fan, leads a gang of vagrant kids and they pickpocket anyone that they come across. When one of the kids steals a snuff bottle from the infamous badman Tiger, Fan seeks to return the bottle. Tiger turns out to be Mr. Shen’s master and the two rogues seek out Wong Chin together.

Mr. Shen and Tiger bully their way into Wong Chin sisters’ home and proceed to rape her while her husband is forced to watch. Emotionally distraught, she commits suicide while the two villains leave to hunt down Wong Chin. In the melee that eventually ensues, Tiger gives Wong Chin a severe beating before Beggar Fan steps in to save Wong Chin. Beggar Fan suggests Wong Chin go to the Shaolin temple. While at the temple, Wong Chin ends up being nothing more than a malcontent, since he lacks any patience, and continuously demands to see the Abbott. Eventually, the Abbott teaches him the Shaolin monkey stick and Buddhist fist techniques, as well as how to be more patient and tranquil. Wong returns home from Shaolin looking for his family, only to discovers what Mr. Shen and Tiger did to his sister and brother-in-law (who was killed after later attacking Mr. Shen in the brothel). With revenge on his mind, Wong Chin is determined to hunt down and dispose of Mr. Shen and his master.

== Cast ==
- Hwang Jang-lee as Wong Chin
- Fan Mei-sheng as Beggar Fan
- Eddy Ko as Uncle 33
- To Siu-ming as Wong Chin's Step brother
- Gwok Yin-yin as Wong Chin's sister
- Tino Wong Cheung as Shan Hao (student of Uncle 33, villain.)
- Chang Il-shik as the shaolin abbot
- Kim Yu-haeng as one of the Elder Shaolin Monk
- Park Hui Jin as one of the Student Monk
- Ah Yeung Yiu-yam as Ah Chi (Shaolin monk)
- Won Jin as One of Beggar Fan's Kid Pickpocket
- Yeung Wai as Shark Hunter (Cameo)
- Corey Yuen as Robber in the Intro (Cameo)
- Baek Hwang-ki as Uncle 33's thug (extra)
- Hwang Choon So as Uncle 33's thug (extra)
- Mang Hoi
- Chin Yuet Sang

== Reception ==
The film was fairly a good reception. The imdb.com gave the film 6.5 out of 10. The website Kung Fu Kingdom quoted "This is the one to own for every classic kung fu enthusiast's collection!".
