= High Price =

Song by Ciara featuring Ludacris

from the album Fantasy Ride
- Released: May 3, 2009
- Recorded: 2008
- Genre: R&B, Crunk
- Length: 4:02
- Label: LaFace, Jive
- Songwriter(s): Christopher Bridges, Terius Nash, Christopher Stewart
- Producer(s): Tricky Stewart, The-Dream

"High Price" is a song by American recording artist Ciara from her third studio album, Fantasy Ride (2009). Featuring rapper Ludacris, it was written by Ludacris, Terius Nash, and Christopher Stewart, and was produced by The-Dream and Tricky Stewart. Ciara had planned to release the song as the album's lead single in June 2008 and fought for its release but Jive Records decided to go with "Go Girl", which was released in September 2008.

== Composition ==
"High Price" is a crunk-influenced R&B song, with booming, low-end, creature-feature synths, which features Ciara singing in operatic soprano. Macpherson of The Guardian magazine commented that the song sees the singer "combining outraged soprano braggadocio with thunderous crunk baselines.". Lyrically, the song is an "ode to acquisitiveness" and a "dramatic, swaggering celebration of flashiness"

== Critical reception ==
"High Price" received a mixed reception from music critics. Jon Sargent of Pop Matters called Ciara's operatic style "ridiculously awesome" New York Times writer, Jon Carmanica called the song Fantasy Ride's best and most conspicuous track, while noting its opera-style vocals as a "spooky and ethereal effect that's both innovative and natural". Many critics compared "High Price" to Ciara's previous single, "Oh" (2005), with Allmusic reviewer, Andy Kellman, calling it a "decent revamp", however he thought that the singer's "outlandish operatics" were a new and nice touch. Leah Greenblatt of Entertainment Weekly wasn't pleased with the song, calling it "lyrically obnoxious" Sal Cinquemani of Slant Magazine called the song" "ridiculous crunk-pop" and stated that "if it weren't so over-the-top, it would be a supreme failure". He also called the song's vocals and lyrics horrendous, noting the line "I should be an Iraq, shawty, 'cause I am the bomb... Booty look softer than a McDonald's hamburger bun"

Rolling Stone magazine ranked "High Price" at #73 on its 100 Best Singles of 2008.

== Music video ==
A music video was due to be released in July 2008, in order to coincide with the song's single release, however with the single cancellation, its release was shelved. A snippet of the video leaked online in July 2010.
