= The Crippled Masters =

1979 Hong Kong film by Joe Law

- American theatrical release poster
- Directed by: Joe Law
- Produced by: Lan Yung Cheng
- Starring: Jackie Conn; Frankie Shum; Chen Mu Chuan
- Release date: 1979
- Running time: 88 minutes
- Country: Hong Kong
- Language: Mandarin

The Crippled Masters (天殘地缺, Hanyu Pinyin: Tiān cán dì quē) is a 1979 Hong Kong martial arts film directed by Joe Law. The film stars disabled martial artists Jackie Conn and Frankie Shum as two men, one without arms and another with withered legs, who train in kung fu and seek revenge upon the teacher who made them disabled.

== Plot ==
The arms of Lee Ho are chopped off by the white-faced henchman known as White, while another man named Tang supervises. It is declared that Lee Ho has betrayed his master, Lin Chang Cao, the boss of the Pluahchi organization, and thus his punishment is justified. Tang is congratulated for carrying out his master's orders and is praised for his loyalty.

After getting his arms cut off and thrown out of the dojo, Lee Ho walks into town to try to get some food. He gets beat up in a restaurant by the bouncer and left for dead with the local coffin maker. The henchmen Black and White then show up and start beating up the coffin maker and Lee Ho. Lee Ho escapes and runs for his life into the wilderness. He comes across a small rural farm and begins to work as hired help. It is here that he learns to live without his arms; he becomes resourceful at using his stump and chin as a gripping device.

Tang is punished by Lin Chang Cao for "knowing too much". Instead of having his arms chopped off, Tang is held down and has acid poured on his legs. Tang is also cast away into the wilderness to die. As he stumbles over rocks by the river, Tang meets up with Lee Ho, who is determined to get his revenge. Lee Ho drags Tang into a cave and begins to beat him. Before he can finish him off, a mysterious Old Man appears and announces that he will start training the two men so that they can get revenge on Lin Chang Cao. At the Old Man's secret training grounds, both Lee Ho and Tang learn kung fu that complements their disabilities.

Lin Chang Cao instructs his henchman to go attack some jewelry thieves. Cao's right-hand man, Pow, ventures with Black and White into the wilderness to take stolen jewelry away from the thieves. On their way back to the Lin Chang Cao's headquarters, they meet up with Lee Ho and Tang. Lee Ho and Tang kill Black and White, but let Pow escape back to report what happened to Lin Chang Cao. In town, Pow gets into a fight with a man named Ho in front of a whorehouse. Lin Chang Cao instructs Pow to hire Ho to kill Lee Ho and Tang. After Ho proves his kung fu ability to Lin Chang Cao, he is hired to be a guard at the main headquarters.

The Old Man instructs Lee Ho and Tang to sneak back into Lin Chang Cao's headquarters and steal back the Eight Jade Horses. Apparently many years ago, the Old Man found this ancient treasure only to have it stolen away by Lin Chang Cao. Under the cover of darkness, the three infiltrate Lin Chang Cao's compound and steal the box containing the horses. But they are discovered as they flee and are followed by Ho. After a big fight scene, Ho tells Lee Ho and Tang that he is a provincial government agent sent to find the missing Eight Jade Horses. He also tells them that the horses are special because they depict special kung fu techniques.

Ho then tries to fight Lin Chang Cao but is unable to defeat him; Lin Chang Cao has a special metal plate in his back that shields him from injuries. Lee Ho and Tang break into Lin Chang Cao's headquarters to rescue Ho. As they escape, they are again followed by henchmen. In anticipation of the final showdown, Lee Ho and Tang study the moves from the Eight Jade Horses. Lin Chang Cao appears and beats up the Old Man. Lee Ho and Tang band together and defeat Lin Chang Cao, ending his reign of terror.

== Cast ==
- Frankie Shum (also known as Sung-Chuan Shen or Chung-Chuen Sam) as Lee Ho
- Jackie Conn (also known as Chao-Ming Kang, Chiu-Ming Hong or Jackie Kang) as Tang
- Chen Mu Chuan as Lin Chang Cao

== Production ==
The film stars Jackie Conn and Frankie Shum, two genuinely handicapped martial artists, as the film's disabled protagonists. Shum, who has thalidomide syndrome, portrays the armless Lee Ho, while Conn portrays Tang.

== Critical reception ==
Nick Hartel of DVD Talk called the film "equal parts exploitation, high camp, and crowd-pleasing action". Though criticizing its "paper-thin plot", he concluded that The Crippled Masters "is not high-art, nor a great martial arts film in the technical sense when compared to a Shaw Brothers film or Bruce Lee classic, but it's still very entertaining, exciting, and doesn't take itself too seriously." In 2015, Jim Vorel of Paste included the film on a list of the 100 best martial arts movies, and wrote that "it's a genuinely disturbing flick to watch at times, but there's some legit physical talent on display".
