= The Shaolin Drunken Monk =

1981 Hong Kong film by Au-Yeung Jun

- Traditional Chinese: 螳螂醉八拳
- Directed by: Au-Yeung Jun
- Starring: Gordon Liu; Eagle Han-ying
- Distributed by: Star Sea Motion Picture Co.
- Release date: 1 October 1981
- Running time: 82 minutes
- Languages: Mandarin and Korean

The Shaolin Drunken Monk is a 1981 kung fu film directed by Au Yeung Chun and Lau Ka-Liang, and produced by Ocean Shores.

== Plot ==
After a kung-fu master is killed by his students and his wife forced into suicide, their son (Lao Chung) must run for his life. Eventually, Lao discovers a hermit who has history in Shaolin and drunken kung-fu and is taught kung-fu. To avenge his parents, Lao kidnaps the daughter of one of the men who betrayed his father in hope of luring him out. Through the process of defeating his minions Lao befriends a one-handed fighter out for similar revenge, and the daughter falls in love with Lao. Lao and the one-handed man team-up in a final battle to the death. When the fight is over the daughter commits suicide in grievance of her father's past deeds, death & Lao's role in them both.

== Cast ==
- Gordon Liu as Lau Chung
- Eagle Han-ying as Wong Kin Chung
- Chang Mi-hee as Ying Ying
- Kim Jae Woo as One armed master
- Chin Yuet-San as Yashiro
- Kwon Il Soo as Master Chung
- Hyun Kil Soo as Lau Chung`s old master
