= Killer's Romance =

1990 Hong Kong film by Phillip Ko

- Film poster
- Traditional Chinese: 自由人
- Simplified Chinese: 自由人
- Hanyu Pinyin: Zì Yóu Rén
- Jyutping: Zi6 Jau4 Jan4
- Directed by: Phillip Ko; Yasuyoshi Shikamura
- Screenplay by: Phillip Ko; Tam Ning
- Based on: Crying Freeman by: Ryoichi Ikegami; Kazuo Koike
- Produced by: Phillip Ko
- Starring: Simon Yam; Joey Wong; Luk Chuen; Phillip Ko
- Cinematography: Ma Kam-cheong
- Edited by: Vincent Leung; Jacky Lrung
- Music by: Norman Wong
- Production company: Regent Film
- Distributed by: D&B Film Distribution
- Release date: 17 May 1990
- Running time: 93 minutes
- Country: Hong Kong
- Language: Cantonese
- Box office: HK$3,232,936

Killer's Romance (released in the Philippines as The Cyprus Tiger) is a 1990 Hong Kong action film written, produced and directed by Phillip Ko, who also co-stars in a supporting role in the film. The film is a loose adaptation of the Japanese manga, Crying Freeman, and stars Simon Yam as the titular protagonist.

== Plot ==
Jenny is a student studying abroad in London living a quiet and happy campus life inadvertently witnesses and took photographs of Yakuza hitman Jeffrey killing an elderly man and her life changes when she becomes involved in the vortex of an underworld vendetta. When Jeffery kills Chinatown triad elder Martin, he encounters Jenny once again, leading the police to believe that Jenny knows Jeffrey and bring her to the police station to question her. Martin's assistant, Charlie, sends his henchmen to follow Jenny in order to find Jeffrey. Jeffery, who broke into Jenny's house, wanted to silence her, but the seeing that the latter deliberately concealed the fact that she witnessed Jeffrey's killings and at the same time, attracted by her temperament, Jeffrey promises a future meeting with her instead. Jenny's good friend, Amy, poses as her friend in order to divert the surveillance of both Charlie and the police in order for Jenny to go meet Jeffrey. As Jeffrey and Jenny meet again, the former reveals to the latter of his life and his decision to leave the Yakuza and his killings committed were to avenge his adopted father, the leader of the Yakuza who took him as an orphan. Yakuza deputy chief Yoshikawa turns out be scheming with Charlie to eliminate Jeffery and sends Jeffrey's assistant Eko to betray Jeffrey and murder him. In an attacked staged by Yoshikawa and Charlie she remains loyal to Jeffrey and was instead killed by her ambitious younger brother, who in turn, was killed by Jeffery, who also kills Charlie. Eventually, Yoshikawa and kidnaps Jenny where he shoots and cripples Jenny's legs when confronted by Jeffrey, leading to final showdown of a sword duel between Jeffrey and Yoshikawa.

== Cast ==
- Simon Yam as Jeffrey
- Joey Wong as Jenny
- Yasuyoshi Shikamura (Luk Chuen) as Yoshikawa
- Phillip Ko as Charlie
- Chan Fung-chi as Eko
- Ka Man
- Lau Siu-ming as Boss Martin
- Ishida Kenichi as Eko's younger brother
- Jason Pai as Siu Yuk-long
- Kam Seung-yuk
- Foo Wang-tat as Jeffrey's adopted father
- Carmen Lee as Amy
- Ling Hon
- Fung Wai-lun as Thug
- Yiu Chan-lam as Thug
- Ho Wan
- Wong Cho-wa
- Lee Wah-kon
- Mak Shu-san
- Ho Chi-moon
- Leung Sam

== Release ==
Killer's Romance was released in Hong Kong on 17 May 1990. In the Philippines, the film was released as The Cyprus Tiger in mid-1992.

=== Critical reception ===
John Krewson of The A.V. Club praised star Simon Yam's acting and physical performance but notes its brush-cuts, poor music and clothes. In the book, The Hong Kong Filmography, 1977–1997: A Reference Guide to 1,100 Films Produced by British Hong Kong Studios, John Charles gave the film a score of 6/10 and praises Yam's convincing performance but criticizes its non-innovative script. So Good Films praised the film's action choreography along with Yam's performance.

=== Box office ===
The film grossed HK$3,232,936 at the Hong Kong box office during its theatrical run from 17 to 30 May 1990.
