= Ninja in the Dragon's Den =

1982 Hong Kong film by Corey Yuen

- Film poster under the title The Legend of Ninja
- Directed by: Corey Yuen
- Written by: Corey Yuen; Ng See-yuen
- Produced by: Ng See-yuen
- Starring: Conan Lee; Hiroyuki Sanada; Hwang Jang-lee; Kwan Yung-moon
- Cinematography: Allan Poon; Wu Kuo-hsiao; Wu Kuo-hsin
- Edited by: Poon Hung
- Music by: Chow Fu-liang; Tang Siu-lam
- Production company: Seasonal Film Corporation
- Distributed by: Seasonal Film Corporation; Toei Company (Japan)
- Release date: 24 June 1982
- Running time: 95 minutes
- Countries: Hong Kong; Japan
- Languages: Cantonese; Japanese
- Box office: HK$7,587,002

Ninja in the Dragon's Den (Chinese: 龍之忍者; pinyin: Long zhi ren zhe) is a 1982 Hong Kong martial arts action comedy film directed by Corey Yuen in his feature film directorial debut, and written by Yuen and Ng See-yuen. It stars Conan Lee, Hiroyuki Sanada and Hwang Jang-lee. The film was released theatrically in Hong Kong on 24 June 1982.

== Plot ==
In Japan of the Tokugawa Ieyasu period, a young ninja named Genbu wantonly kills samurai and other government officials, leaving his clan to face the blame. When they hunt him down, Genbu and his wife Akane sail to China both to escape their wrathful kinsmen and for Genbu to complete his revenge by finding the last man he holds responsible for his father's death.

That man, Fukusa, leads a peaceful life as a mirror maker under the name of Uncle Fu. He has a young protégé, Sun Jing, a smug martial artist who constantly tries to prove himself by taking up every opportunity to fight. Jing also constantly teases his lecherous servant Chee and takes few things very seriously. When he sees his surrogate father attacked, Jing immediately rushes to his aid, but after several clashes he finds out that he and the ninja are evenly matched.

It is revealed that Genbu's father was not killed by his clan members; he instead died as a hero in a rebellion years ago. Ashamed of his own cowardice in fleeing to China following that attempted uprising, Fu makes peace with Genbu. But before their final encounter, Fu took poison to restore his honor by his own death. Fu asks Genbu to kill him in order to spare him the final agony, which promptly leads to a misunderstanding between Genbu and Jing. The two battle each other to the top of Jing's family temple and eventually settle their differences just in time to face The Magician, a spiritual boxer whose son Jing has insulted in the course of the movie.

The film ends with Jing and Genbu killing the Magician, with some unwitting assistance from Akane and Chee. The latter promptly tempts fate by claiming the better part of the credit for this victory, prompting Genbu and Jing to teach him a lesson.

== Cast ==
- Conan Lee – Sun Jing, one of the main protagonists and a smug but skilled Chinese martial artist
- Hiroyuki Sanada – Genbu, one of the main protagonists and a skilled ninja from Japan
- Tai Bo – Chee, Sun Jing's easygoing and lecherous servant
- Hiroshi Tanaka - Fukusa/"Uncle Fu", the man Genbu holds responsible for his father's death
- Kaname Tsushima – Akane, Genbu's wife
- Hwang Jang-lee – The Magician, a demon-spiritualistic kung fu master
- Kwan Yung-moon – Sanchiro, the kashira (leader) of Genbu's ninja clan
- Ma Chin-ku
- Tien Feng
- Wu Jiaxing
- Chen Chin-hai
- Cheung Chung-kwai
- Chin Lung
- Ho Hing-nam
- Alan Lee Hoi-hing
- Ng See-yuen
- Peng Kang
- Wang Yao
- Wei Ping-ao – Doctor in Clinic (Chee's father)
- Yukio Someno – Monk, a senior member of The Magician's cult

== Reception ==
As of December 2019, the film holds a Rotten Tomatoes rating of 76% based on 277 reviews. Reviews specifically praise the film's dynamics, its unusual story, and its theme song.

== DVD release ==
On 25 March 2002, DVD was released by Hong Kong Legends in the United Kingdom in Region 2.

== See also ==
- Hwang Jang-lee filmography
- List of Hong Kong films of 1982
- List of Hong Kong films
- List of ninja films
