= Death Duel of Kung Fu =

1979 Hong Kong film by William Cheung Ki

Death Duel of Kung Fu 形手螳螂腿
- Directed by: William Cheung Ki
- Written by: Chan Wa; Cheung San Yee
- Produced by: Chang Yan Tao; See Lai Woo
- Starring: John Liu; Don Wong Tao; Eagle Han-ying
- Cinematography: William Cheung Ki
- Distributed by: Kee Woo Films
- Release date: 1979
- Running time: 82 minutes
- Country: Hong Kong
- Language: Cantonese

Death Duel of Kung Fu is 1979 Hong Kong martial art movie, directed by William Cheung Ki and starring John Liu, Don Wong Tao and Eagle Han-ying. It is also known as Showdown of the Master Warriors and Return of the Secret Rivals as an alternate title. With in say, the movie has no relationship with the Secret Rivals trilogy but most of the filming locations took places in South Korea although the story is set in China, which makes the result that it makes a similar storyline as Secret Rivals. It is also Eagle Han-ying`s first Hong Kong movie debut.

== Plot ==
It opens with the top fighter and general Sun Chin Qwei (Don Wong) kills marshall Tao and heads to the Taiwan to join the army however it is later pursued by the lord To Ko Lam (Eagle Han). Qwei escapes and along the way he fell in love with the Japanese girl Keigi who is actually a descent of To Ko Lam but later fall in love with Qwei. Meanwhile, northern kick boxing champion Sun Hsun (John Liu) is giving an Sun Chin Qwei a hard time but later they join forces together to defeat To Ko Lam.

== Casts ==
- John Liu as Sun Hsun
- Don Wong Tao as Sun Chin Qwei
- Eagle Han as To Ko Lam
- Kim Chung Ja as Keigi
- Wu Jia Xiang as Marshall Tao (cameo)
- Chan Yiu Lam as Ka Yee Kee
- Peter Chan as Marshall Tao`s assistant (cameo)
- Chung Fat as To Ko Lam`s sword fighter
- King Lee Chung as To Ko Lam`s swords fighter
- Cheung Tin Ho (extra)
- Gam Hing Ji (extra)
- Chin Yuet Sang (stunts)
- Lam Hak Ming (extra)
- Mang Hoi (extra, stunts)

== Reception ==
The movie got positive receptions. IMDb gave 6.4/10 and Amazon.com gave 4.1/5.

== Production and impact ==
The movie was filmed in South Korea. Some of the locations took from the same location from the Secret Rivals. Once again Don Wong and John Liu teamed up together, except this time the villain was replaced to Eagle Han-ying instead of Hwang Jang Lee. Rumors have heard Hwang Jang Lee was supposed to return to Don Wong and John Liu however being that Hwang Jang Lee was already working on in Hong Kong for the movies such as Dance of the Drunken Mantis and Hell`s Windstaff for 1979. This results to give a leading villain role for Eagle Han who numerously worked for the low budget movies (such as Bruce Le`s Return of the Red Tiger.) in South Korea.

The success of the movie will later give him more villain roles in Kim Jeong Young`s movies. Nevertheless, this was John Liu`s last Korean and Hong Kong production film and will later working on Hong Kong industry. Don Wong however will later team up with Eagle Han several times again in films such as lost film Quick Step Mantis and Wild Panther (1984).

Some of the film's stunt performers from Sammo Hung's stunt team, served as a choreographer and stunt doubles for this film, including Chung Fat, Chin Yuet Sang, and Mang Hoi whom served as a main stunt co-ordinator and stun-double for John Liu.
