= Dragon Fist =

1979 Hong Kong film by Lo Wei

- Theatrical poster
- Directed by: Lo Wei
- Written by: Wang Chung-pin
- Produced by: Hsu Li-hwa; Lo Wei
- Starring: Jackie Chan; Nora Miao; Yen Shi-kwan; Ouyang Sha-fei; Im Eun Joo; James Tien; Kim Young Il; Wu Wen-sau
- Cinematography: Chen Yung-hsu
- Edited by: Leung Wing-chan
- Music by: Frankie Chan
- Distributed by: Lo Wei Motion Picture Company
- Release date: 21 April 1979
- Running time: 93 minutes
- Country: Hong Kong
- Language: Mandarin
- Box office: HK$1 million (Hong Kong); 246,046 tickets (overseas)

Dragon Fist (simplified Chinese: 龙拳; traditional Chinese: 龍拳, also known as Dangsang Martial Arts or The Wild Big Boss) is a 1979 Hong Kong martial arts film directed by Lo Wei, who also produced it alongside Hsu Li-hwa. The film stars Jackie Chan, Nora Miao, Ouyang Sha-fei, Yen Shi-kwan, Im Eun Joo, James Tien, Kim Young Il, Hsu Hsia, and Wu Wen-sau. The film was released theatrically in Hong Kong on 21 April 1979.

== Plot ==
Tang How-yuen (Jackie Chan) is a disciple of kung fu master San-thye. San-thye wins a martial arts tournament, only to be killed by evil kung fu master, Master Chung Li (Yen Shi-kwan). Tang tries unsuccessfully to fight Chung, and leaves the evil master unharmed. Tang, along with San-thye's wife and daughter head after the killer to seek revenge. When they find him, Chung has repented and has cut off his own leg as penance. The master's widow becomes ill, so Tang goes to work for a gang in order to get her medicine. However, whilst in their employ, he gets blamed for the death of a young boy, and San-Thye's widow is poisoned. Tang and the one-legged master join forces to defeat the evil lord who poisoned San-thye's widow.

== Cast ==
- Jackie Chan as Tang How-yuen
- Yen Shi-kwan as Master Li
- Nora Miao as Zhuang Meng-lan
- Ouyang Sha-fei as Master King's wife
- Im Eun Joo - Zhong Qiu-ping
- James Tien as Fang Gang
- Kim Young Il as Nan Qing
- Hsu Hsia as Master King
- Ko Keung as Master Wing
- Chui Yuen as Wing's student
- Wong Kwong-yue as Wing's assistant
- Chui Fat as Wing's assistant
- Peng Kang as Wing's student
- Wang Yao as Wing's student

== Production ==
Like Chan's Spiritual Kung Fu, Dragon Fist was filmed in South Korea in early 1978 but was unable to be released or produced because the studio went bankrupt and was running out of money. As a result, both Lo Wei productions only had cost-cutting measures after Chan returned from his loan deal with Seasonal Films, where he made Snake in the Eagle's Shadow and Drunken Master alongside director Yuen Woo-ping. During the production, Chan reportedly had his nose broken repeatedly, joking "Do you think I was born with this nose?" Unlike most of Jackie Chan's early films, Dragon Fist had a more serious tone, with little in the way of comedic moments.

Like many other Hong Kong kung fu films, the film was scored with various musical cues from American films, mainly Jerry Goldsmith's 1966 score for The Sand Pebbles.

== Box office ==
The film was released in Hong Kong on 21 April 1979. The film grossed HK$1,004,000 at the Hong Kong box office in 1979. Overseas, the film sold 103,261 tickets in Seoul City (South Korea) and 142,785 tickets in France (where it was released in 1982), for a combined 246,046 tickets sold overseas in Seoul and France.

== Home media ==
- On 15 February 2001, Seven 7 released the French language theatrical version DVD entitled Le Poing De La Vengeance, with an aspect ratio of 2.35:1. It contains no other language options.
- On 22 October 2001, Eastern Heroes released the film in the UK on DVD, uncut (except for many frame cuts). However, it's poorly cropped from 2.35:1 to 1.78:1 and only contains an English dub.
- On 4 June 2002, Columbia Tri-Star released the film in the US on DVD, in 2:35:1 with English and Cantonese language options. However, it contains a heavily edited version produced by Aquarius Releasing (roughly 15 minutes missing) and is dubtitled.
- On 24 February 2006, Universal Japan released the film in Japan on DVD, in 2.35:1 and with a Cantonese soundtrack. This version was the first completely uncut release on DVD, however, it does not feature any English subtitles.
- On 11 June 2007, Hong Kong Legends released the film in the UK on DVD, in 2.35:1 and uncut in Cantonese language with newly translated English subtitles.
- In 2018, UK company 88 Films released the film on Blu-ray. It contains the original Mandarin, Cantonese, and English language tracks in mono and 5.1 DTS-HD MA formats. The Blu-ray also includes subtitles for each track option. It is uncut and remastered in genuine HD.

== See also ==
- Jackie Chan filmography
- List of Hong Kong films
- List of martial arts films
- Southern Dragon Kung Fu
