= Mang Hoi =

Hong Kong actor (1958–2023)

- 孟海
- Died: 9 October 2023; Hong Kong
- Other names: Harrison Mang; Randy Mang
- Occupations: Actor; action director
- Years active: 1969–2023
- Spouse: Unknown (m. 1988)
- Children: 1
- Awards: Hong Kong Film Awards – Best Supporting Actor at the 5th Hong Kong Film Awards; 1986 Yes, Madam

Mang Hoi (Chinese: 孟海; 1 May 1958 – 9 October 2023) was a Hong Kong actor and action director. He won the Best Supporting Actor at the 5th Hong Kong Film Awards for Yes, Madam.

== Personal life and death ==
Mang dated American actress and martial artist Cynthia Rothrock. He was married to another woman with a daughter at the time. On 9 October 2023, Mang died of oesophageal cancer at the age of 65.

== Selected filmography ==
- The Price of Love (1970)
- Pursuit (1972) – Little Helper
- The Young Avenger (1972)
- The Human Goddess (1972)
- Fist of Unicorn (1973) – Hsiao-Hu (Guest star)
- Enter the Dragon (1973, cameo) – Ship's mate (uncredited)
- Death Blow (1973) – Theater Kid
- Honor and Love (1973)
- Iron Bull (1973)
- Call me Dragon (1974) – Siu Gam's Sidekick
- Godfather Squad (1974) – Wang's little brother
- Bruce Lee, D-Day at Macao (1974) – Little Monkey
- The Silent Guest of Pecking (1975)
- Challenge of the Masters (1976)
- Kidnap in Rome (1976)
- The Iron Fisted Monk (1976)
- Executioners from Shaolin (1977) – Shaolin Pupil (uncredited)
- Shaolin Plot (1977) – assassin beggar (cameo)
- The Fatal Flying Guillotines (1977)
- Strife of Mastery (1977)
- Deadly Chase for Justice (1977)
- Fist of Dragon (1977)
- He Has Nothing But Kung Fu (1977)
- Enter the Fat Dragon (1978) – Fighter in Opening Credit Sequence
- Mysterious Footworks of Kung Fu (1978) – Minor Role
- Dirty Tiger, Crazy Frog (1978) – Casino thug (extra)
- Kung Fu Means Fists, Strikes and Sword (1978) – Minor Role
- Gee and Gor (1978)
- Amsterdam Connection (1978) – Tung's Henchman
- Heaven Sword and Dragon Sabre, Part 2 (1978) – Yuan's Guard
- Warriors Two (1978) - Twin Sword Fighter
- The Incredible Kung Fu Master (1979) – Hoi
- Hell's Wind Staff (1979) – Shih Hai Lung
- Way of the Black Dragon (1979) – Thug (extra)
- The Fearless Hyena (1979, extra / stunts)
- Kung Fu Vs. Yoga (1979, action director)
- Death Duel of Kung Fu (1979, action director)
- The Buddha Assassinator (1979) – Hsiao Hai
- Kung Fu Fever (1979, action director)
- Wonderman From Shaolin (1979) – assistant action director
- The Star, the Rogue & the Kung Fu Kid (1980) – Shao
- The Ring of Death (1980, action director)
- Hitman in the Hand of Buddha (1981, action director)
- Ninja in the Dragon's Den (1982, action director)
- Dragon Lord (1982) – Lu Chen gang member
- The Shaolin Drunken Monk (1982, assistant action director)
- Zu: Warriors from the Magic Mountain (1983) – Yi Chen
- Double Trouble (1984)
- Twinkle, Twinkle, Lucky Stars (1985) – Person at the end
- For Your Heart Only (1985) – Sapi
- Heart of Dragon (1985, action director) – Yan
- Yes, Madam! (1985) – Aspirin
- Dragon Against Vampire (1985, action director)
- Righting Wrongs (1986, action director)
- Legacy of Rage (1986, action director) – Four Eyes/Hoi
- No Retreat, No Surrender (1986, action director)
- Millionaires Express (1986) – Bank Robber
- Where's Officer Tuba? (1986)
- My Cousin the Ghost (1987) – Q
- Keep on Dancing (1988) – Ship Thug (uncredited)
- Gai juk tiu mo (1988)
- Pedicab Driver (1989) – Rice Pudding
- Lady Reporter (1989) – Shorty
- The Blonde Fury (1989) – Hai
- Encounters of the Spooky Kind II (1990) – Little Hoi
- Shanghai Shanghai (1990) – Hai
- The Nocturnal Demon (1990) – Delivering Uniforms
- Gambling Ghost (1991) – Siu Hon
- The Tantana (1991) – Ah Hoi
- Spiritually a Cop (1991)
- City Hunter (1993) – Henchman ("Room service")
- The Stunt Woman (1996) – Copy
- 97 Aces Go Places (1997)
- The Extra (1998) – Mahjong Player (cameo)
- No Problem (1999) – Director
- Perfect Education 3 (2002) – Faday
- Osaka Wrestling Restaurant (2004) – Policeman (cameo)
- Ip Man: The Final Fight (2013) – Chess Onlooker
- Kung Fu Jungle (2014) – Human Gang Leader (final film role)
