= The Fearless Young Boxer =

1973 Hong Kong film by Jimmy Shaw

Chinese name
- Traditional Chinese: 小子命大
- Simplified Chinese: 小子命大
Transcriptions
Standard Mandarin
- Hanyu Pinyin: Xiǎozi mìng dà
- Directed by: Jimmy Shaw
- Produced by: Jimmy Shaw
- Starring: Peter Chen Lau; Chan Wai Lau; Fei Lung; Casanova Wong; Kwok Chu Wong
- Release date: 1979
- Running time: 94 minutes
- Country: Hong Kong
- Language: Mandarin

The Fearless Young Boxer (小子命大; Xiǎozi mìng dà), also known as Avenging Boxer and Method Man, is a 1979 Hong Kong martial arts film directed by Jimmy Shaw and starring Casanova Wong.

== Plot ==
Wo Pa Feng (Casanova Wong) kills one of his former gang members, Li Tien Yen (Fei Lung), in a duel. Before the duel, Li Tien Yen gives his son, Shao Lung (Peter Chen) a gold plate that Wo Pa Feng is looking for. Shao Lung goes looking for his father and witnesses his death at the hands of Wo Pa Feng while hiding in the bushes.

The distraught Shao Lung joins his uncle Xiao Lung’s travelling kung-fu show. His uncle teaches him kung fu via various training montages to improve his fighting skills to get him to actively participate in the show and hopefully build up his self-esteem, he also receives training from his cousin, Xiao Ling (Hwa Ling).

During one of their performances, Shao Lung spots Wo Pa Feng in the audience and throws a sword at him. Wo Pa Feng doesn’t recognize Shao Lung, so he passes it off as an accident and hands him back his weapon. Everyone is shocked at Shao Lung's actions until he reveals that it was the man that killed his father. Lu Yun Hai (Xiao Lung) who is using "Pa" as a surname, tells his nephew that he’s not good enough to take revenge and not to get involved. Wo Pa Feng meets with the man known as the "Magistrate" a high ranking elder in his gang. He informs him that he’s killed Li Tien Yen but did not get the gold plate and has learned that Li Tien Yen has a son. He then mentioned that he was attacked at the performance he attended and simply wanted to ask his attacker some questions before he (Shao Lung) ran off.

Shao Lung, his 2 uncles, and Xiao Ling arrive in a new town and settle down for another show. When Xiao Ling goes into town to shop, she is pursued by a (rather annoying) man who claims to be “descended from warriors”, who expresses his attraction to her, which she clearly doesn't reciprocate. After he touches her, she slaps him, and he assumes it means that she likes him, and proceeds to stalk her. Shao Lung intervenes and, after watching the man warm up with an odd martial arts display, proceeds to beat him up, and his accomplice. Shao Lung and Xiao Ling are reprimanded by Xiao Lung as he doesn’t want them attracting unwanted attention. Despite his uncle’s warning, Shao Lung again gets into a fight on a young, pickpocketing, beggar’s named Stumpy's behalf (who steals his gold plate). In the process, Shao Lung completely ruins someone’s business and when departing, runs into Wo Pa Feng again. Shao Lung pretends that he’s just a random bystander, then runs off when he notices that the gold plate given to him by his father is missing. Shao Lung pursues Stumpy, who refuses to return it. After a long pursuit, Stumpy escapes after he tricks Shao Lung when they get caught up in a wedding caravan. That evening, Shao Lung’s uncle is upset that he lost the gold plate as it’s the chief's talisman and whoever possesses it can give orders and everyone in the gang must obey. Shao Lung vows to get the gold plate back.

Shao Lung gets into another altercation with the men who were harassing his cousin, who just so happen to be affiliated with Wo Pa Feng's gang. He informs his brother (who controls the territory) that the man who beat him up (again) is with the traveling show and they send men to wreck it, meanwhile, Wo Pa Feng watches in attendance to see if he can get a lead on Li Tien Yen's son. Fed up with Shao Lung getting into fights, uncle kicks him out of the show and sends him away. Shao Lung runs off and lives with an old monk (fortune teller) that he met previously. Shao Lung tells the monk about his father's murder and the monk teaches him more kung-fu to improve his current skills. While he’s training, Wo Pa Feng runs into Shao Lung again and the two have a friendly spar. Wo Pa Feng tells Shao Lung to meet him at the garden if he just so happens to run into the son of Li Tien Yen, who he believes is part of the traveling kung-fu show.

Stumpy comes and meets with the monk, who notices that Stumpy is carrying a gold plate. The monk scolds Stumpy and tells him to give Shao Lung back his gold plate. Wo Pa Feng finds one of Shao Lung’s uncles (who uses the surname "Pa") and kills him. Stumpy stumbles upon the murder and is chased by Wo Pa Feng when he notices that Stumpy has the gold plate. The normally elusive Stumpy refuses to tell Wo Pa Feng where he got the plate and is killed while trying to escape. The boss of the territory tells Wo Pa Feng that Stumpy was just a poor beggar and that he killed the wrong person. Xiao Lung (Lu Yun Hai) receives the body of his murdered brother. He sends a letter to Shao Lung and Xiao Ling telling them that he is going to confront Wo Pa Feng and not to come looking for him. While on his way to settle the score with Wo Pa Feng. He runs into the Magistrate who shares a room at the inn with Wo. The Magistrate knows who he is and announces that Lu Yun Hai is a traitor and that he broke the rules and he has the right to kill him. After he defeats the Magistrate, Lu Yun Hai reveals himself to Wo Pa Feng and says that he'd go back with him but only if he lets Shao Lung keep his life. Pa Feng cruelly reminds him of the penalty for breaking the rules of the gang—absolutely "no excuses at all"—no exceptions permitted. The two enemies fight, but Xiao Lung is no match for Wo Pa Feng—because he's gotten too old and has lost his strength—and is subsequently, killed.

The old monk tells Shao Lung and Xiao Ling not to be in a hurry to take revenge for their respective parents and to use their intelligence, since one-on-one, they are no match for Wo Pa Feng. Shao Lung meets with Wo Pa Feng and tells him that the man that he’s looking for is hiding out at an old warehouse where Shao Lung and Xiao Ling set a trap for him so they can finally take revenge. The end fight is brilliantly choreographed and displays the incredible mastery of kicking by the great Casanova Wong!

== Cast ==
- Peter Chen Lau as Shao Lung
- Chen Wai Lau as Uncle
- Fei Lung as Shao's father
- Casanova Wong as Wu Pa Fong

== Reception ==
In their 1995 book The Encyclopedia of Martial Arts Movies, authors Bill Palmer, Karen Palmer and Ric Meyers gave The Fearless Young Boxer a score of four out of four stars, writing: "The martial arts and choreography are absolutely wonderful, and the film has a slam-bang finish."

== Influence ==
Rapper Method Man adapted his stage name from one of the film's alternate titles.
