= Hwang Jang-lee =

South Korean martial artist (1944–2026)

- Born: 21 December 1944; Aomori, Honshu, Japan
- Died: 12 November 2026 (aged 81); Seoul, South Korea
- Occupations: Martial artist; actor
- Years active: 1974–1996; 2009

Korean name
- Hangul: 황정리
- Hanja: 黃正利
- RR: Hwang Jeongri
- MR: Hwang Chŏngni

Hwang Jang-lee (Korean: 황정리; 21 December 1944 – 12 November 2026) was a South Korean martial artist and actor best known for his Hong Kong martial arts films. He was a ninth-dan grandmaster in Tang Soo Do and Taekwondo who began training in 1957. Prior to his acting career, Hwang was a martial arts instructor for the Korean military in Vietnam.

Hwang began his acting career in 1974. Later, he was offered employment in Hong Kong by Ng See-yuen, where he appeared in the kung fu film Secret Rivals as the villain Silver Fox, a role he reprised in several other films, most notably Secret Rivals 2 (1977). He gained prominence for appearing in the films Drunken Master (1978) and Snake in the Eagle's Shadow (1978), both opposite Jackie Chan, and Hitman in the Hand of Buddha (1981), which marked his directorial debut. He collaborated with Hong Kong filmmaker Corey Yuen on several films, including Snuff Bottle Connection, Secret Rivals 2, The Invincible Armour (all 1977), Dance of the Drunk Mantis (1979), Ninja in the Dragon's Den (1982), and Millionaires Express (1986). His other films include Hell's Wind Staff, Buddha Assassinator (both 1979), Two Fists Against the Law, and Game of Death II (both 1980).

He was a martial arts instructor with the World Tang Soo Do General Federation and served as technical adviser. Among his most notable students is Roy Horan, who appeared with Hwang in several films.

== Early life ==
Hwang was born in Aomori, Honshu Island, Japan, on 21 December 1944, to Korean parents. His father owned a shipping company and moved his family back to Korea when Hwang was a baby.

== Martial arts and philosophy ==
Hwang began learning Taekwondo from age 14 and received a seventh dan (rank) black belt. In 1965 at 21, he became a martial arts instructor for the Republic of Korea and South Vietnamese armies, specializing in taekwondo. In addition, he held a ninth dan rank with the World Tang Soo Do General Federation.

He was a life long martial arts teacher. Hwang was an instructor with the tang soo do federation and technical adviser. Among his most notable students is Roy Horan, who appeared with Hwang in several films and also directed the instructional video series The Art of High Impact Kicking (1982), based on Hwang's taekwondo techniques. In 2013, Hwang completed a tour of the U.S. and Canada in which he, along with other Korean Grandmasters, promoted the study and practice of traditional martial arts.

Stressing that powerful kicks come from the hips, Hwang said, "You know my legs are just normal, there's nothing special about them. When I train I always use my hips, use the circular motion… the hips is where the power comes from. Then I kick like this… and like this… it's all coming from the hips."

Hwang named Jackie Chan, Yuen Biao, Lo Lieh, Ti Lung and Sammo Hung as his picks for the top five kung-fu fighters.

He criticized Olympic Taekwondo, saying, "You know this is very different, Taekwondo, you know, it's for killing people. Taekwondo in the Olympics, it's a sport, you know, it's not a martial arts, so I don't really like this style. For me, Taekwondo is a martial art."

=== Acting ===
Hwang began his acting career in Korea. Later, Ng See-yuen offered Hwang employment in Hong Kong, where he first appeared in Secret Rivals as the villain Silver Fox. Hwang had major roles in many martial arts movies, usually playing the villain. His nicknames "King of the Leg Fighters" and "Thunder Leg" attest to his dexterity of his kicks.

In the mid-1970s, Hwang appeared in two Jackie Chan movies, Snake in the Eagle's Shadow as Sheng Kuan and Drunken Master as Thunderfoot (Thunder Leg). In 2002, writer-producer Mike Leeder interviewed Hwang for the Contender Hong Kong Legends DVD series.

=== Directing ===
In 1981, Hwang directed his first movie, Hitman in the Hand of Buddha and was credited as Wong Chin.

=== Other work and retirement from acting ===
In 1987, Hwang trained German actor Matthias Hues in preparation for the latter's film debut as Yuri the Russian in No Retreat, No Surrender 2. Cast at the suggestion of producer Roy Horan, a student of Hwang, Hues had no martial arts experience and trained under Hwang. Hues enjoyed the experience so much that upon arrival in Los Angeles, he continued training in martial arts throughout his career. In the film, Hwang's opening scene of a firing squad was cut from the U.S. version. Hwang would play Yuri's enforcer, Gen. Ty, who engages in a brief fight against Cynthia Rothrock.

In 1989, taekwondo grandmaster and actor Jun Chong invited Hwang to the U.S. to appear as a villain in the film Street Soldiers. To bring an international flavor to the movie, Hwang was credited as Jason Hwang, using his son's name. In the early 1990s, the elder Hwang returned to South Korea to run a golf tee manufacturer and a hotel in Seoul, later managing a private security agency. He has since made occasional film appearances such as in Emperor of the Underworld (1994) and Boss (1996). In July 1996, Hwang retired from acting at age 51.

On December 20, 2025, Hwang was moved to tears while attending a fan meetup in Japan to mark his 81st birthday when former Hong Kong action star Yukari Oshima made a surprise visit.

=== Return to acting ===
After a long absence from acting, Hwang in 2009 appeared in the TV series The Return of Iljimae. He was also featured in the documentary "The Anonymous King," in which Jon James Hodson examines Hwang's personal life in Seoul, Korea and Hong Kong.

== Personal life and death ==
On 12 November 2026, Hwang died after collapsing at his home in Gangnam, Seoul. He was taken to Seoul St. Mary's Hospital, but was not able to be revived. Hwang was 81.

== Filmography ==
=== Film ===
Year	Title	Role	Notes
1974	Secret Envoy		
1974	Black Leopard	Tortured Hero	
1974	Korean Connection	Kazio (Yamamoto's Guard)	
1974	Korean Connection 2		
1974	Left Foot of Wrath		
1975	Viper		Venomous Snake
1975	Year of the Dragon	Hero's Father / Final Challenge Fighter	Kill the Shogun
1975	Invitation From Hell		
1975	Fury of the Sun		
1975	Death Game	Paeng Mar Kow	Mortal Battle
1975	Jailhouse		
1975	Secret Rivals	Silver Fox	
1976	Secret Agent	Drunkard Student	
1976	Bruce Lee's Secret	Jin Yong Ji	
1976	Bruce Lee Fights Back from the Grave		
1976	Shaolin Wooden Men		Brief Appearance
1976	Black Dragon River		The Martialmates
1977	Secret Rivals 2	Chin Hu (Gold Fox)	
1977	Invincible Armour	Minister Cheng	
1977	Heroes of Shaolin	Tien Lung-Chong	Heroes of the Wild
1977	Snuff Bottle Connection	General Shantung (Magistrate)	
1977	The Instant Kung Fu Man	Yi Lang	
1978	Great Martial Arts Teacher		
1978	Snake in the Eagle's Shadow	Master Shang Kuan Yin	
1978	Drunken Master	"Thunderleg" Yen Tieh Hsin (Thunderfoot)	
1979	The Fearless Duo	Ghost Leg Killer	Fearless Master Fighter
1979	Dance of the Drunk Mantis	Rubber Legs	
1979	Hell's Wind Staff	Lu Shan Tu	The Dragon and the Tiger Kids
1979	36 Deadly Styles	Cheung Sze (First Brother)	
1979	Dragon's Claws	Ling Ko Fung	
1979	The Eagle's Killer	Ghost Hand Lo Hsin	
1979	Demon Strike	Chai Chau-Tien (Lord)	Death Duel of Silver Fox
1980	Lackey and the Lady Tiger	Sek Ba	
1980	Game of Death II	Chin Ku	
1980	Two Fists Against the Law	Master Tai	
1980	Tiger Over Wall	Chu	
1980	Young Hero	Leader of Japanese Invaders	
1980	Two Heroes		Sangwoong
1980	The Ring of Death	Russian Fighter	
1980	Buddha Assassinator	Prince Yi	
1980	Challenge of the Tiger	Comrade Yang	
1980	Eagle vs. Silver Fox	Sa Sung (Silver Fox)	
1980	Martial Monks of Shaolin Temple	Kurt Wong, Chief of Wudong School	Champ vs. Champ
1981	Hitman in the Hand of Buddha	Wong Chin	Director, Producer
1981	The Phantom Thief	(as Jeong-ri Hwang)	
1981	Buddhist Fist & Tiger Claws		Half Piece of Map
1981	Return of the Deadly Blade	Kam (Invincible Golden Rings)	Guest Star (Brief Appearance)
1981	Hard Bastard		Raging Rivals
1982	Blood Child	Wong Hung	Five Fingers of Steel
1982	Ninja Strikes Back	Wang Fei	
1982	Ninja in the Dragon's Den	Wizard Kung Fu Master	
1982	Secret Ninja, Roaring Tiger	Tiger So	
1982	Kid from Kwang Tung	Luo Yihu	
1982	Secret Executioners		
1982	Masters of Tiger Crane	Silver Fox / Keum-wung (Villain)	
1982	Eagle Claw vs. Butterfly Palm	Sing Kun's Master	
1983	Five Pattern Dragon Claw	Kam Fu	Thunderfist
1983	Duel of Ultimate Weapons	Dong Wan / Ki-ryong	
1983	Ghosts Galore	Japanese Magician	
1983	Canton Viper	Kal Ma-ryong	Director
1983	Angry Young Man	Master Kang	
1984	Shaolin: The Blood Mission	Dan Bang / General Yuen Fong	
1985	Ninja Terminator	Tiger	Uninvited Guest (Footage)
1986	The First Vampire in China	Ghost of March	
1986	The Innocent Interloper	Paleface	
1986	Where's Officer Tuba	Extortion Gang Member (Blackmailer)	
1986	Millionaire's Express	Yukio Fushiki	
1986	Future Hunters	Silverfox	
1987	Iron Angels	Boss Chang Lung	Fighting Madam
1987	Magnificent Warriors	General Toga's Henchman (Collaborator)	Dynamite Fighters
1987	No Retreat, No Surrender 2	Ty	
1988	Bed Companion	Lee Chiu Sin	
1989	Darkside of Chinatown	Sheung Siu Tung's Hitman	
1989	Live Hard	Chief Inspector Terry Chiu	
1991	Street Soldiers	Tok	
1994	Emperor of the Underworld	Yoo, Deok-pal	Director
1996	Boss	Seong Cheon	

=== Director ===
- Hitman in the Hand of Buddha (1981)
- Canton Viper (1983)
- Not Again! (1990)
- Emperor of the Underworld (1994)

=== Documentaries ===
- Art of High Impact Kicking (1982)
- The Good Bad Boy (2014)

=== Television series ===
- Shaolin Temple (Taiwanese TV series) (1984)
- Mighty Weapon (1985)
- The Return of Iljimae (2009)
