= First Film Organisation =

Taiwan-based film production company (1967–2004)

- Native name: 第一影業機構
- Romanized name: Dìyī Yǐngyè Jīgòu
- Type: Private
- Industry: Film production Film distribution Film exhibition
- Founded: 1967; 59 years ago
- Founder: Wong Cheuk-hon
- Defunct: 2004
- Fate: Dissolved; library held by First Distributors (HK) Ltd.
- Headquarters: Hong Kong (registered); Taiwan (production base)
- Area served: East Asia; Southeast Asia; North America
- Key people: Wong Cheuk-hon (founder, chairman); Wong Hoi (successor, Golden Flare Films)
- Products: Wuxia films Martial arts films Romantic dramas Art films
- Subsidiaries: First Distributors (HK) Ltd. Han Hua Film Co. Golden Flare Films

First Film Organisation (Chinese: 第一影業機構; pinyin: Dìyī Yǐngyè Jīgòu), also known as First Films (H.K.) or First Organization, was a Taiwan-based film production and distribution company founded in 1967 by Hong Kong producer Wong Cheuk-hon. The company produced over 200 films between 1967 and 1994, becoming the fourth largest film institution in the Hong Kong–Taiwan region during the 1970s, trailing only Shaw Brothers Studio, Golden Harvest, and the Central Motion Picture Corporation.

First Film Organisation is best known for producing King Hu's Legend of the Mountain (1979), which won six Golden Horse Awards, and Jimmy Wang Yu's Master of the Flying Guillotine (1976), which became one of the most influential cult martial arts films in the West. The company pioneered a vertically integrated, cross-border business model—registered in Hong Kong while maintaining its production base in Taiwan—and operated cinema chains across Asia and North America.

== History ==
=== Predecessor companies (1952–1966) ===
First Film Organisation was the third production company founded by Wong Cheuk-hon, building on infrastructure and talent relationships from two predecessors. Liberty Film Co. (自由影業公司, 1952–1958) produced Mandarin-language films and established Wong as the first Hong Kong filmmaker to shoot in Taiwan. Lan Kwong Film Company (嶺光影業公司, 1959–1966) produced 53 Cantonese titles and pioneered Hong Kong–Korean co-productions, including The Flaming Mountain (火焰山, 1962), the first Hong Kong Cantonese film shot in Eastmancolor widescreen.

These earlier ventures established distribution relationships across Southeast Asia, a talent pipeline including stars Helen Li Mei, Jeanette Lin Tsui, and Alan Tang, and production experience in Taiwan that First Film would inherit.

=== Founding and early years (1967–1970) ===
When King Hu's Dragon Inn (1967) ignited Taiwan's wuxia craze at Union Film, Wong recognized the commercial opportunity and established First Film Organisation in 1967, permanently relocating his production base to Taiwan. The company was registered in Hong Kong to access colonial-era banking infrastructure and established Southeast Asian distribution channels, while production occurred primarily in Taiwan, where costs were lower and the Kuomintang government actively courted filmmakers.

Wong himself wrote and directed the company's inaugural production, Crazy Swordsman (大瘋俠, 1968), which helped establish the wuxia film trend in Taiwan. The early output was prolific and almost exclusively wuxia and action films.

=== Peak years (1971–1979) ===
The 1970s represented First Film's commercial zenith. By 1971, Wong began recruiting major stars to elevate the company's profile. Jimmy Wang Yu—"the biggest star of Asian martial arts cinema until Bruce Lee"—became a cornerstone talent, driven partly to Taiwan-based work by a legal injunction from Shaw Brothers' Run Run Shaw. Chen Sing, known for commanding villain roles, joined alongside Polly Shang-kuan Ling-feng, whom Wong reportedly secured with a HK$100,000 deposit after her Union Film contract expired in September 1971. Japanese martial artist Yasuaki Kurata rounded out the stable.

A 1977 survey by critic Tony Rayns published in Sino-Cinema identified First Film and Goldig as "the most enterprising" independent companies in Taiwan. The company's vertically integrated business model encompassed production, distribution, and exhibition, with Wong purchasing the Kuotu Theatre (國都戲院) and Huasheng Theatre (華聲戲院) in Taipei, and eventually building the Huasheng cinema chain across six cities in the United States and Canada.

==== Jimmy Wang Yu partnership ====
Jimmy Wang Yu, formerly Shaw Brothers' biggest male star, had broken his contract with Shaw in 1970 and was effectively banned from making films in Hong Kong after Shaw won a lawsuit against him. He relocated to Taiwan, where First Film Organisation became one of his primary production partners.

The partnership's defining achievement was Master of the Flying Guillotine (獨臂拳王大破血滴子, 1976), produced by First Films (H.K.) and Cheng Ming Film Co., with Wong Cheuk-hon as producer and Wang Yu writing, directing, and starring. The film's international martial arts tournament format—featuring fighters from different countries with distinct styles—and its unauthorized use of German Krautrock bands (Neu!, Tangerine Dream, Kraftwerk) for its soundtrack created a surreal atmosphere that deepened its cult appeal.

==== King Hu collaboration ====
Wong Cheuk-hon's most critically acclaimed collaboration came with director King Hu in the late 1970s. After Hu's two Golden Harvest co-productions (The Fate of Lee Khan and The Valiant Ones, 1975) underperformed commercially, Wong provided financial backing for an ambitious double production filmed over eleven months in South Korea (1977–1978).

Legend of the Mountain (山中傳奇, 1979) was produced by Hu's own Feng Nian (豐年) company with Wong Cheuk-hon as executive producer, while Raining in the Mountain (空山靈雨, 1979) was produced through Lo & Hu Company Productions Ltd. Both films were shot at Korea's Bulguksa Temple and surrounding locations, exploiting South Korean government subsidies that required producing two films. The Hong Kong Film Archive biography states Wong explicitly "supported King Hu" (支持胡金銓) in making these films, providing a patron-producer model that gave the auteur resources without studio interference.

Legend of the Mountain swept the 16th Golden Horse Awards, winning six prizes: Best Film, Best Director, Best Cinematography, Best Art Direction, Best Recording, and Best Original Score. Its original 191-minute version was cut to 105 minutes for general release without Hu's approval; the complete version was not seen until the 2016 4K restoration.

==== Qiong Yao adaptations ====
First Film diversified beyond martial arts into romance, producing adaptations of popular novelist Qiong Yao's bestselling works. Fantasies Behind the Pearly Curtain (一簾幽夢, 1975), directed by the distinguished Pai Ching-jui and starring Charlie Chin and Patrick Tse, exemplified this commercially astute strategy—Qiong Yao adaptations were reliable box-office performers in Taiwan throughout the 1970s.

=== Transition period (1980–1989) ===
The decade after 1979 proved existential for Taiwan's commercial film industry. Hong Kong's New Wave (featuring directors such as Tsui Hark, Ann Hui, and Alex Cheung) rendered traditional martial arts films dated, while Taiwan's own New Cinema movement, launched with In Our Time (1982), redirected critical and audience attention toward realistic, literary filmmaking. Home video proliferation undercut theater-dependent studios. For First Film, built primarily on wuxia and kung fu, this transformation was devastating.

Wong adapted through three strategies. First, he established Han Hua Film Co. (漢華影業社) in 1981 specifically to distribute Western (Hollywood) films in Taiwan—a pragmatic pivot leveraging his cinema circuit for imported content rather than struggling domestic production.

Second, he shifted the production company's identity entirely, pivoting from martial arts to historical prestige filmmaking. The Story of Dr Sun Yat Sen (國父傳, 1986), directed by longtime collaborator Ting Shan-hsi, assembled an unprecedented ensemble of Hong Kong and Taiwan stars—reportedly the most Hong Kong actors ever gathered in a Taiwanese production. The cast included Alex Man as Huang Xing, Derek Yee as Lu Hao-dong, Kara Wai as revolutionary Qiu Jin, Deanie Ip, Lau Kar-leung, Moon Lee, Chin Siu-ho, and many others, each paid a modest HK$5,000–10,000 honorarium plus airfare. The film grossed NT$46 million in Taiwan and received theatrical releases in Italy, France, and Spain. As a patriotic biopic about the ROC founder, it aligned with Taiwan's government-supported cultural agenda.

Third, Wong's son Wong Hoi (黃海) established Golden Flare Films Co., Ltd. (金韻電影有限公司) in the late 1980s, effectively succeeding First Film Organisation as the active production entity.

Taiwan's lifting of martial law on 15 July 1987 further transformed the industry by enabling cross-strait cultural exchange and allowing previously censored material, opening new co-production possibilities with mainland China while intensifying foreign competition in Taiwan's market.

=== Final years (1990–2004) ===
By the 1990s, the Wong family's corporate structure had settled into a clear hierarchy: First Film Organisation served as the legacy umbrella and presenter; Golden Flare Films handled active production under Wong Hoi; and First Distributors (HK) Ltd. managed distribution and the growing film library.

This arrangement produced the company's final—and arguably finest—film. Red Rose White Rose (紅玫瑰白玫瑰, 1994), directed by Stanley Kwan, adapted Eileen Chang's 1944 novella with Joan Chen, Veronica Yip, and Winston Chao, cinematography by Christopher Doyle, and a budget of approximately $3 million. Variety's credit line revealed the family enterprise at work: "A First Distributors/Warner Asia release of a First Organization (Hong Kong)/Golden Entertainment (Taiwan) presentation of a Golden Flare Films Co. production. Produced by Hoi Wong [Wong Hoi]. Executive producer, C.H. Wong [Wong Cheuk-hon]." The film was shot in Shanghai studios—itself a testament to the post-martial-law era's cross-strait openness.

Red Rose White Rose won five awards at the 31st Golden Horse Awards: Best Actress (Joan Chen), Best Adapted Screenplay, Best Art Direction, Best Costume Design, and Best Original Score. It screened in competition at the 45th Berlin International Film Festival and was hailed by Variety as Kwan's "most emotionally resonant and deeply realized work since Rouge."

Wong Cheuk-hon received the Lifetime Achievement Award at the inaugural 30th Golden Horse Awards ceremony in 1993, recognizing his contributions through First Film and its predecessors. He published his memoir 《電影人生：黃卓漢回憶錄》 (A Life in Movies) in 1994, which has since become a primary source for the company's history.

Wong died in Hong Kong on 8 October 2004 at age 85, and First Film Organisation was dissolved. The bulk of the film library was donated to the Hong Kong Film Archive—over 200 films plus more than 10,000 items of production materials. The distribution arm, First Distributors (HK) Ltd., continues operations under Wong Hoi.

== Filmography ==
First Film Organisation produced over 200 films between 1967 and 1994. The following tables document confirmed productions organized by era and genre.

=== Founding era (1967–1970) ===
First Film Organisation productions, 1967–1970
Year	Title	Chinese title	Director	Genre	Notes	Ref
1967	Tigress Is Coming			Martial arts		
1968	Crazy Swordsman	大瘋俠	Wong Cheuk-hon	Wuxia	Wong's directorial debut; company inaugural production	
1968	Super Swordsman			Martial arts		
1968	The Terrible Killer			Martial arts		
1969	The Flying Swordgirl	女飛俠		Martial arts		
1969	The Young Avengeress			Martial arts		
1970	Million Dollar Bride			Drama		
1970	The Infatuated Persons			Romance		
1970	Hate Me Not			Drama		
1970	The King and Queen	歌王歌后		Musical	Sing-song film	
1970	Way Ching Killed the Dragon			Martial arts		

=== Peak era: Martial arts films (1971–1979) ===
First Film Organisation martial arts productions, 1971–1979
Year	Title	Chinese title	Director	Stars	Notes	Ref
1971	Extreme Enemy				Action	
1971	Struggle Karate				Martial arts	
1972	A Man of Wealth				Drama	
1972	Furious Slaughter	霸王拳	Ting Shan-hsi	Jimmy Wang Yu	1930s-set martial arts	
1972	Ma Su Chen	馬素貞			Martial arts	
1972	Chow Ken				Action	
1973	The Boxer from Kwongtung				Martial arts	
1973	Knight Errant		Ting Shan-hsi	Jimmy Wang Yu, Yasuaki Kurata	Modern martial arts	
1973	A Gathering of Heroes	趕盡殺絕		Jimmy Wang Yu, Chen Sing	Also known as A Man Called Tiger	
1973	Seven to One				Action	
1973	The Two Cavaliers				Martial arts	
1973	Black Panther				Action	
1973	A Girl Called Tigress				Martial arts	
1973	Gold Snatchers				Action	
1973	Empress Dowager's Agate Vase				Period drama	
1974	Ghost of the Mirror	古鏡幽魂	Sung Tsun-shou	Brigitte Lin, Shih Chun	Supernatural drama; early Brigitte Lin role	
1976	Master of the Flying Guillotine	獨臂拳王大破血滴子	Jimmy Wang Yu	Jimmy Wang Yu, Kam Kong	90% Rotten Tomatoes; Quentin Tarantino favorite; Wu-Tang Clan samples; cult classic	
1977	The Brave Lion	勇乳蛟龍	Joseph Kuo	Polly Shang-kuan Ling-feng		

=== Peak era: King Hu collaborations (1979) ===
First Film Organisation – King Hu productions
Year	Title	Chinese title	Role	Awards	Notes	Ref
1979	Legend of the Mountain	山中傳奇	Executive producer	6 Golden Horse Awards: Best Film, Best Director, Best Cinematography, Best Art Direction, Best Recording, Best Original Score	Original 191-min cut restored 2016; premiered Venice Classics 2018; released by Kino Lorber (US), Eureka Masters of Cinema (UK)	
1979	Raining in the Mountain	空山靈雨	Executive producer	Hong Kong submission for Best Foreign Language Film	Filmed at Bulguksa temple, South Korea; 2K restored 2018; released by Film Movement (US), Eureka (UK)	

=== Peak era: Romantic dramas and other genres (1971–1979) ===
First Film Organisation romantic and drama productions, 1971–1979
Year	Title	Chinese title	Director	Genre	Notes	Ref
1971	Husband, Wife, Maid			Comedy/drama		
1971	The Deceiver			Drama		
1974	News Hen			Drama		
1974	The Brother Two			Action		
1974	The Marriage	婚姻大事		Wenyi drama		
1974	Shocking Asia		Rolf Olsen	Documentary/mondo	German co-production	
1975	Fantasies Behind the Pearly Curtain	一簾幽夢	Pai Ching-jui	Qiong Yao romance	Starring Charlie Chin, Patrick Tse; filmed in South Korea	

=== Transition era productions (1980–1989) ===
First Film Organisation and Golden Flare Films productions, 1980–1989
Year	Title	Chinese title	Director	Genre	Production company	Notes	Ref
1985	Shocking Asia II: The Last Taboos			Documentary/mondo	First Film / Geiselgasteig Film	German co-production; sequel to 1974 film	
1986	The Story of Dr Sun Yat Sen	國父傳	Ting Shan-hsi	Historical epic	First Film	50+ HK/Taiwan stars; Alex Man, Derek Yee, Kara Wai; NT$46M Taiwan gross	
1988	Operation Pink Squad	霸王女福星	Jeffrey Lau	Action comedy	Golden Flare Films	Starring Sandra Ng	
1989	Thunder Cops II	流氓差婆	Jeffrey Lau	Action comedy	Golden Flare Films / First Films	Sandra Ng, Stephen Chow	

=== Final era productions (1990–1994) ===
First Film Organisation and Golden Flare Films productions, 1990–1994
Year	Title	Chinese title	Director	Stars	Production company	Awards	Ref
1990	Prince of the Sun	太陽之子		Cynthia Rothrock	Golden Flare Films		
1993	Crazy Hong Kong			Tony Leung Chiu-wai, Carina Lau	Golden Flare Films		
1994	Red Rose White Rose	紅玫瑰白玫瑰	Stanley Kwan	Joan Chen, Veronica Yip, Winston Chao	Golden Flare Films (presented by First Film)	5 Golden Horse Awards: Best Actress, Best Adapted Screenplay, Best Art Direction, Best Costume Design, Best Original Score; Berlin competition	

== Cultural influence ==
=== Western cult cinema ===
Master of the Flying Guillotine grew its following through bootleg VHS copies, grindhouse screenings, and television syndication programs like "Kung Fu Theatre" (USA Network) and "Black Belt Theater" (WPIX). Quentin Tarantino has called it "one of my favorite movies of all time," and his Kill Bill (2003) bears its influence throughout: the Shaw Brothers logo opens both volumes, Go Go Yubari's weapon echoes the flying guillotine device, and the track "Super 16" by Neu!—originally used without permission in Wang Yu's film—was licensed for the House of Blue Leaves sequence.

The film's international tournament format—fighters from different countries with distinct styles—is recognized as a conceptual prototype for the tournament structures in fighting video games. Capcom designer Akira Nishitani acknowledged martial arts films as influences on Street Fighter II (1991), and Dhalsim's design—an Indian yoga practitioner who extends his limbs to attack—bears striking resemblance to the Indian yogi fighter in the film.

=== Hip-hop culture ===
The Wu-Tang Clan has prominently sampled and referenced First Film productions. The track "Wu-Tang Clan Ain't Nuthing ta Fuck Wit" samples dialogue from Master of the Flying Guillotine: "Fatal flying guillotine chops off your fuckin' head!" RZA launched the 36 Cinema streaming platform in May 2020, screening classic kung fu films with live commentary.

=== 21st-century influence ===
The wuxia tradition exemplified by First Film productions continues to influence contemporary cinema. Shang-Chi and the Legend of the Ten Rings (2021) explicitly drew on the genre, with director Destin Daniel Cretton citing Hong Kong martial arts films as influences, and choreography by Brad Allan of the Jackie Chan Stunt Team.

Into the Badlands (AMC, 2015–2019), starring Daniel Wu, explicitly referenced Shaw Brothers and King Hu traditions, with fight coordinator Master Dee Dee Ku (The Matrix, Crouching Tiger, Hidden Dragon).

Lin Jing-jie's documentary The King of Wuxia (大俠胡金銓, 2022), a 221-minute tribute to King Hu featuring interviews with John Woo, Tsui Hark, and Ann Hui, brought renewed attention to the Wong-Hu collaboration.

== Film preservation ==
=== Hong Kong Film Archive retrospective (2024) ===
In 2024, the Hong Kong Film Archive mounted a major retrospective, "Morning Matinee—Wong Cheuk-hon's Cinema Dream Life" (影畫早晨——黃卓漢的影夢人生), screening 16 selected films in 2K digital restorations across six thematic sections. The retrospective represented the most comprehensive public presentation of First Film's catalogue since the company's dissolution.

=== Restoration status ===
The original negatives of Legend of the Mountain were stored at the Hong Kong Film Archive by First Film Organisation until 2016, when they were authorized for 4K digital restoration by the Taiwan Film and Audiovisual Institute. The restoration premiered at the Venice Film Festival's Classics section and was subsequently released by Kino Lorber (US) and Eureka Masters of Cinema (UK).

Raining in the Mountain received a 2K restoration in 2018, also by TFAI, released by Eureka in 2020 and Film Movement in the US.

Master of the Flying Guillotine remains without a proper HD Blu-ray release due to damaged source materials and unresolved music licensing issues with the Krautrock soundtrack, making it one of the most sought-after restorations in cult cinema.

== Business structure ==
First Film Organisation pioneered a vertically integrated, cross-border corporate structure that anticipated features of the modern global film industry.

=== Corporate divisions ===
First Film Organisation corporate structure
Entity	Founded	Function	Scope	Status (2025)
First Film Organisation Ltd.	1967	Production	Hong Kong-registered; Taiwan production base	Dissolved 2004
First Distributors (HK) Ltd.	1976	Distribution	200+ film rights (1950–1995); worldwide	Active (Wong Hoi, mgr.)
Han Hua Film Co.	1981	Western film distribution	Taiwan market	Unknown
Golden Flare Films Co., Ltd.	c. 1987	Production	Successor production entity	Active
Huasheng Cinema Chain	1970s	Exhibition	6 cities (US/Canada) + Taipei theaters	Ceased by 2000s

=== Distribution and library ===
First Distributors (HK) Ltd. (香港第一發行有限公司), founded in 1976, holds sole copyright to over 200 Chinese-language titles produced between 1950 and 1995 by Liberty Film, Lan Kwong, First Film Organisation, and Golden Flare Films. Key library titles include Master of the Flying Guillotine, Legend of the Mountain, the Shocking Asia series, and Red Rose White Rose.

Remarkably, the company remains active as of 2025, managed by Wong Hoi from offices at Unit 9-D, Hollywood Centre, Sheung Wan, Hong Kong. First Distributors attends major international film markets including Berlin EFM, Hong Kong FILMART, and Cannes Marché du Film annually, and has expanded into acquiring foreign-language films (including recent French titles) for the Hong Kong market.

=== Exhibition circuit ===
Wong's Huasheng cinema chain (華聲院線) operated in six cities across the United States and Canada during the 1970s and 1980s, specializing in Mandarin-language films. The specific six cities remain unconfirmed, though the broader Chinese-language cinema circuit of that era concentrated in New York City, Los Angeles, San Francisco, Toronto, and Vancouver, with additional theaters in Houston, Chicago, or other major Chinatown cities. Between 50 and 100 Chinese movie theaters operated across North America during this period; Wong's chain was one of several major operators alongside Frank Lee Sr.'s network and Shaw Brothers-linked Golden Films International. The Huasheng chain declined with the VHS revolution in the late 1980s and had ceased operations by the 2000s.

In Taiwan, Wong owned the Kuotu Cinema (國都戲院) and Huasheng Cinema (華聲戲院) in Taipei.

== Key personnel ==
=== Leadership ===
- Wong Cheuk-hon (黃卓漢, 1920–2004) – Founder, chairman, producer, occasional director; established predecessor companies Liberty Film and Lan Kwong; Golden Horse Lifetime Achievement Award (1993)
- Wong Hoi (黃海) – Son of Wong Cheuk-hon; founder of Golden Flare Films (c. 1987); current managing director of First Distributors (HK) Ltd.

=== Directors ===
Principal directors associated with First Film Organisation
Name	Chinese name	Years active	Notable First Film productions	Other credits
King Hu	胡金銓	1977–1979	Legend of the Mountain, Raining in the Mountain	A Touch of Zen, Dragon Inn
Jimmy Wang Yu	王羽	1974–1976	Master of the Flying Guillotine, Beach of the War Gods	The One-Armed Swordsman
Ting Shan-hsi	丁善璽	1972–1986	Furious Slaughter, Knight Errant, The Story of Dr Sun Yat Sen	Shaw Brothers director
Stanley Kwan	關錦鵬	1994	Red Rose White Rose	Rouge, Center Stage
Pai Ching-jui	白景瑞	1975	Fantasies Behind the Pearly Curtain	Taiwan New Cinema pioneer
Joseph Kuo	郭南宏	1977	The Brave Lion	Taiwan martial arts director
Law Chi	羅志	1968	Crazy Swordsman	
Sung Tsun-shou	宋存壽	1974	Ghost of the Mirror	

=== Contract performers ===
Principal actors under First Film Organisation contract
Name	Chinese name	Years active	Notable First Film roles	Later career
Jimmy Wang Yu	王羽	1971–1978	Master of the Flying Guillotine, Furious Slaughter	First major kung fu star before Bruce Lee; died 2022
Polly Shang-kuan Ling-feng	上官靈鳳	1973–1980	The Brave Lion	Golden Horse Award for Best Leading Actress (1973)
Chen Sing	陳星	1972–1978	A Gathering of Heroes	Known for villain roles; died 2019
Yasuaki Kurata	倉田保昭	1973–1979	Knight Errant	Japanese martial artist; later Jackie Chan collaborator
Brigitte Lin	林青霞	1974	Ghost of the Mirror	Major Hong Kong star; Swordsman II
Joan Chen	陳冲	1994	Red Rose White Rose	Golden Horse Best Actress (1994)

== Awards and honors ==
=== Golden Horse Awards ===
Golden Horse Awards won by First Film Organisation productions
Year	Ceremony	Film	Awards won
1979	16th Golden Horse Awards	Legend of the Mountain	6 awards: Best Film, Best Director, Best Cinematography, Best Art Direction, Best Original Score, Best Recording
1993	30th Golden Horse Awards	—	Lifetime Achievement Award to Wong Cheuk-hon (inaugural recipient)
1994	31st Golden Horse Awards	Red Rose White Rose	5 awards: Best Actress (Joan Chen), Best Adapted Screenplay, Best Art Direction, Best Costume Design, Best Original Score

=== International recognition ===
- Raining in the Mountain (1979): Hong Kong submission for Academy Award for Best Foreign Language Film
- Red Rose White Rose (1994): In competition, 45th Berlin International Film Festival
- Legend of the Mountain (2018): Venice Film Festival Classics section (4K restoration premiere)

== See also ==
- Cinema of Taiwan
- Cinema of Hong Kong
- Wuxia
- Shaw Brothers Studio
- Golden Harvest
- Union Film
- Central Motion Picture Corporation
- Wong Cheuk-hon
- Golden Flare Films
