= Chow Ken =

1972 Hong Kong film by Ting Shan-hsi

- German film poster
- Directed by: Ting Shan-hsi
- Written by: Ting Shan-hsi
- Produced by: Wong Cheuk-hon
- Starring: Jimmy Wang Yu
- Cinematography: Lin Wen-Chin
- Production company: First Film Organisation
- Distributed by: First Film Organisation (Hong Kong)
- Release date: 6 July 1972 (Hong Kong)
- Running time: 92 minutes
- Country: Hong Kong
- Language: Mandarin

Chow Ken (Chinese: 秋瑾), also known as Fury of King Boxer, is a 1972 Hong Kong film starring Jimmy Wang Yu.

== Plot ==
During the Manchu occupation of China, a male and a female rebel enlist other fighters to join the Boxer Rebellion.

== See also ==
- Qiu Jin
