= Dragon Inn =

1967 Taiwanese wuxia film by King Hu

- Theatrical release poster
- 龍門客棧
- Directed by: King Hu
- Written by: King Hu
- Produced by: LS Chang
- Starring: Shang-Kuan Ling-feng; Shih Chun; Bai Ying; Tsao Chien; Miao Tien
- Cinematography: Hua Hui-Ying
- Edited by: Chen Hung-min
- Music by: Chow Lan-Ping
- Production company: Union Film Company
- Release date: October 1967
- Running time: 111 minutes
- Country: Taiwan
- Language: Mandarin

Dragon Inn (龍門客棧), also known as Dragon Gate Inn, is a 1967 Taiwanese wuxia film written and directed by King Hu. Set in 15th-century China during the Ming dynasty, the film follows a small, disparate band of martial artists who protect the exiled family members of a respected official from persecution by a treacherous eunuch and the secret police.

Hu had recently left Hong Kong to Taiwan where he set-up the short-lived Union Film Company. The film was shot in 1966. The film was released in 1967, and broke box‐office records in Taiwan, Korea, and the Philippines.

Dragon Inn received positive retrospective reviews in Empire, Radio Times and Sight & Sound, with critic Michael Brooke of the latter magazine referring to the film as "one of the most important wuxia films to emerge from the Chinese-speaking world prior to the great martial arts boom of the turn of the 1970s." The film was remade as New Dragon Gate Inn (1992) and Flying Swords of Dragon Gate (2011).

== Synopsis ==
The film is set in 15th-century China during the Ming dynasty after Emperor Yingzong has returned to power following a palace coup. Yu Qian, the War Minister, is falsely accused of treason and executed, and his family members are exiled to a remote town in northwest China. Cao Shaoqin, a treacherous eunuch who controls the jinyiwei (secret police), sends his men to kill the Yu family.

Wu Ning, the owner of Dragon Gate Inn in the town, had previously served under Yu Qian and now sees it as his duty to protect the Yu family. He recruits three highly-skilled martial artists – Xiao Shaozi, and the siblings Zhu Hui and Zhu Ji – to help him. Together, the four of them work to defeat Cao Shaoqin and the jinyiwei, and deliver the Yu family to safety.

== Cast ==
- Shih Chun as Xiao Shaozi
- Shang-Kuan Ling-feng as Zhu Hui
- Bai Ying as Cao Shaoqin
- Miao Tien as Pi Shaotang
- Han Ying-chieh as Mao Zongxian
- Hsieh Han as Zhu Ji
- Tsao Chien as Wu Ning

== Production ==
Prior to the financial success of director King Hu's Come Drink with Me (1966) he had left the Shaw Brothers Studio. Cinematographer Nishimoto Tadashi said that money was also a factor for Hu's departure as while Come Drink With Me was performing well in the box office, he was only being paid HKD 2,500 for his film. In 1965, director King Hu left the Hong Kong-based Shaw Brothers Studio just after completing Come Drink with Me. Union Film’s partner and representative in Hong Kong, Zhang Taoran, had known Hu before his commercial success with Come Drink with Me. Knowing Hu was unhappy working at Shaw Brothers, Taoran approached Hu about working in Taiwan after. The Union Film Company, was initially started in Taiwan in 1953 as a film distribution business. In 1963, they received investments from the Singapore-based Cathay Organisation and co-founded the Grand Motion Picture Company. This was made with Li Han-hsiang, another former Shaw Brothers employee who had left to work in Taiwan. Li Han-Hsiang partnership with Union ended in 1966 while the Cathay Organisation was having problems following the death of its chief executive, Loke Wan Tho. This led to Union hiring King Hu as a production chief who would train new talent and buy equipment to facilitate the studios operations. With a new contract with Union Film, Hu was set to make HKD 18,000 per film in his first year and 20,000 per film in his second. Cinematographer Nishimoto Tadashi said that money was also a factor for Hu's departure as while Come Drink With Me was performing well in the box office, he was only being paid HKD 2,500 for his film.

According to mainland China critic Song Ziwen, Hu had wanted to make another wuxia film for the company based on the short story "The Painted Skin" Hu dropped this idea and would only return to that subject for his last film, Painted Skin (1992).

After failing to maintain Hu as a director, Shaw Brothers sent Raymond Chow to Taiwan to negotiate with Union's Sha Youngfung as Shaw Brothers insisted that Hu still contractually owed them six more films. Shaw Brothers wanted Union to give them the distribution rights to the next four King Hu films in Singapore, Malaysia and Burma. Sha Youngfung did not agree, but as Shaw Brothers threatened to go to the Taiwanese government to demand they investigate Hu's background, Youngfung worried that Hu could become blacklisted as a communist which would prevent him from working in the country at all. This concern eventually had him accept Shaw Brothers requests. These events were the backdrop against which Hu was busy shooting his next film, Dragon Inn, in central Taiwan in 1966.

Hu himself credited the combat techniques to the choreography of Han Ying-chieh, better known as the titular villain in the film The Big Boss (1971). Han Ying-chieh had trained in the Peking Opera with Hu stating they had designed their combat scenes as being more like ballets instead of plausible fights. David Bordwell described the fighting style the characters use in Hu's films as an "unfussy, impersonal technique" where heroes rarely succumb to anger and often only exchange sharp glances. Instead of floating through the air for extended periods like swordsmen characters in 1990s Hong Kong films, Hu's fighters are rendered in short hand with quick editing, even when doing grander feats like the character of Cao Shaoquin leaping through trees in the end of Dragon Inn.

== Release ==
Dragon Inn premiered in October 1967. The film set box‐office records in Taiwan, Korea, and the Philippines. It grossed over 4.4 million NTD (New Taiwan dollar) in Taiwan. The film was the second-highest grossing film in Hong Kong in 1968 behind You Only Live Twice. The film had over 300,000 patrons in South Korea.

The Union Film Company did not make a great profit from Dragon Inn, as they had a deal with Shaw Brothers who owned the distribution rights to Dragon Inn in Hong Kong and Southeast Asia. Shaw Brothers had this deal as via an exchange that was done in trade for letting King Hu break his contract with them to work on Dragon Inn.

It was first screened in the United States in 1968 at an academic conference organized by translator and scholar Joseph Lau Shiu-Ming. The film's digital restoration premiered in North America at the 2014 Toronto International Film Festival.

=== Home video ===
In 2014, academic James A. Steintrager said that King Hu's films never enjoyed the global name-brand recognition that was bestowed on other filmmakers such as Akira Kurosawa. This led to what he described as a "shambolic state" for King Hu's films, which had not seen any restoration treatment and were only available on "shoddy DVD transfers." Writing for Cinéaste in 2018, David Neary said that there was a "recent awakening" among Western cinephiles to martial arts films, which led to numerous releases of these types of films from art house-based home video labels such as Eureka and The Criterion Collection.

Dragon Inn was released in 2015 in the United Kingdom on Blu-ray and DVD through Eureka Entertainment's Masters of Cinema line of releases. It received a Blu-ray release in the United States in July 2018 by Criterion.

== Reception ==
At the 1968 Golden Horse Awards, Dragon Inn won the award for Best Screenplay and was a runner-up for Best Director.

In 2011, the Taipei Golden Horse Film Festival had 122 industry professionals take part in the survey. This voters included film scholars, festival programmers, film directors, actors and producers to vote for the 100 Greatest Chinese-Language Films. Dragon Inn tied with Wong Kar-wai's In the Mood for Love (2000) for ninth place on the list.

In the United Kingdom, Empire gave the film four stars out five, referring to it as a "A keystone of the wuxia genre" and noted that the film "may lack plot complexity and period spectacle. But the stand-off in a remote inn is flecked with tension, wit and slick martial artistry." Michael Brooke (Sight & Sound) referred to Dragon Inn as "one of the most important wuxia pian films to emerge from the Chinese-speaking world prior to the great martial arts boom of the turn of the 1970s." and that it was "riotously entertaining". Brooke commented on the action scenes, opining that they "aren't quite as breath-catchingly dexterous as the ones Hong Kong cinema would later produce, they're both lively and agreeably frequent, with Hu using the Scope frame to its full advantage". Brooke concluded that "If it's not quite first-rank Hu when set against A Touch of Zen or The Fate of Lee Khan, it makes for a superb introduction." The Radio Times gave the film a four out of five star rating, and felt the film surpassed Come Drink With Me, noting that Hu's "control over camera movement and composition is exemplary, building the tension and invigorating the swordplay."

== Aftermath and influence ==
Dragon Inn was remade twice, first as New Dragon Gate Inn (1992) and as Flying Swords of Dragon Gate (2011).

Taiwanese director Tsai Ming-Liang directed the film Goodbye, Dragon Inn (2003). The film is set in a decrepit Taipei movie theater on its final night in business which is screening Dragon Inn. The film's characters either watch the film very closely or are humorously distracted from it; two of the actors from the original film are in the audience as well.

== See also ==
- Cinema of Taiwan
- List of Taiwanese films before 1970
