= Hsu Feng =

Taiwanese/Hong Kong actress and film producer

- 徐楓
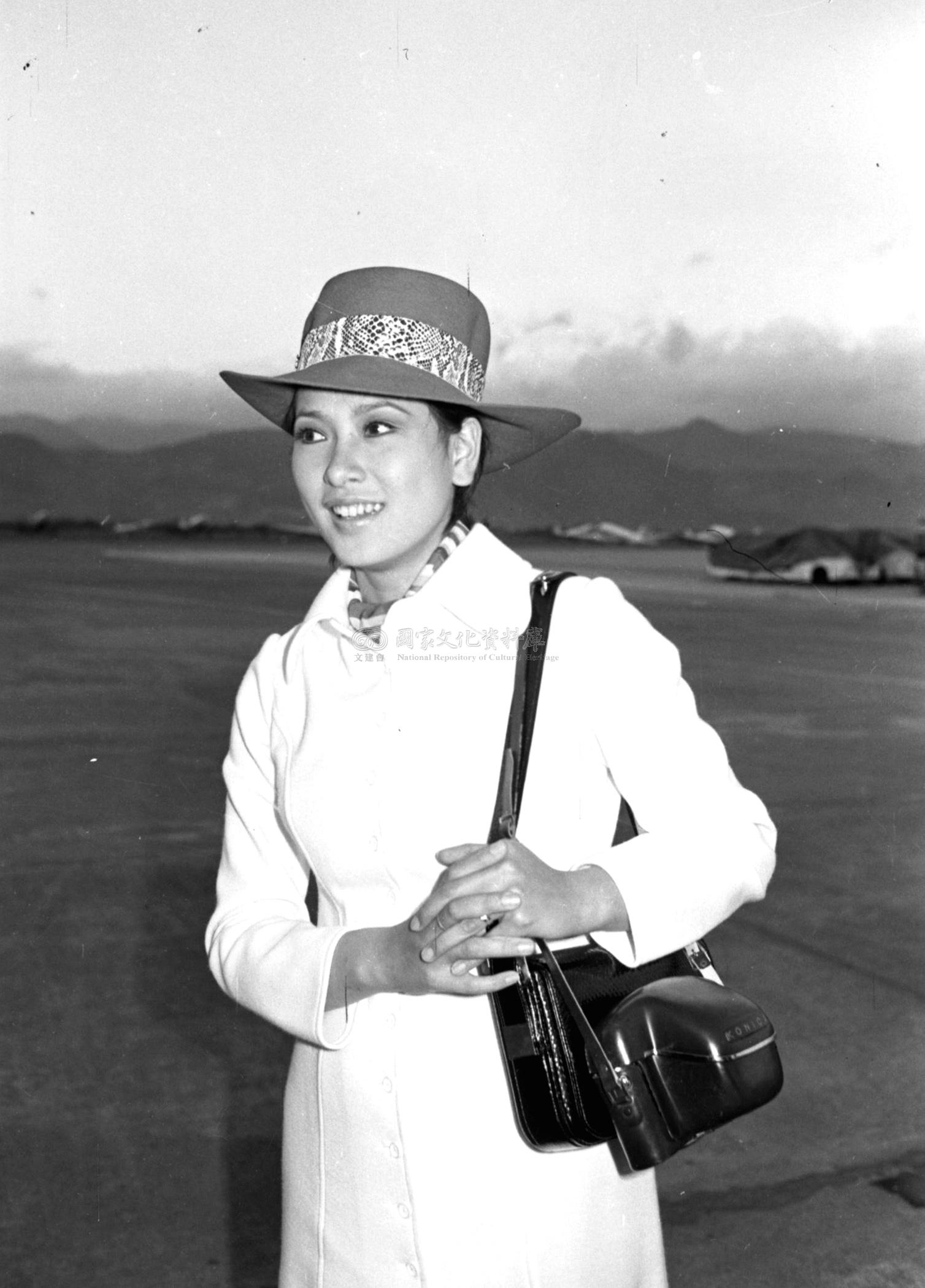
- Feng in 1970
- Born: December 17, 1950 (age 75); Taipei, Taiwan
- Other name: Xu Feng
- Occupations: Actress, film producer, businesswoman
- Years active: 1966–present
- Children: 2

Hsu Feng
- Traditional Chinese: 徐楓
- Simplified Chinese: 徐枫
Transcriptions
Standard Mandarin
- Hanyu Pinyin: Xú Fēng

Hsu Feng (born 17 December 1950) is a Taiwanese-born actress and film producer. In the 1970s she was one of the leading actresses of the cinemas of Hong Kong and Taiwan, particularly known for her roles in wuxia films and her work with director King Hu. In 1981 she retired from her career as an actress, but a few years later she returned to the film industry as a producer and went on to produce several award-winning movies. Among them was Chen Kaige's Farewell My Concubine, which won the Palme d'Or (1993) and the BAFTA Award for Best Film not in the English Language (1994) and was nominated for an Academy Award and a César for best foreign film as well.

== Early life ==
Feng was born in Taiwan. Her father was originally from Fujian and her mother from Manchuria. Her father died when she was 6 and her mother remarried. Feng later became the oldest sister of three half siblings. She got her start in film as a means of financially supporting her poor family. Feng answered a casting ad at age 15, which led to a minor role in King Hu's film Dragon Gate Inn (1967). In part, the role led to a six-year contract with the Union Film Company, and away from factory work.

== Career ==
=== Acting ===
About two years later after her small role in Dragon Gate Inn at the age of 19 she got a leading part in King Hu's classic martial arts epos A Touch of Zen (1971). She played the daughter of general Yang, who had to flee the capital after her father was murdered by assassins of the imperial eunuch Wei. Her performance was later described by the film critic Richard Corliss (Time) as the screen's gravest, most ravishing woman warrior. A Touch of Zen later also changed Hsu's outlook on films. Originally she just viewed them simply as a commercial product and means to earn living, but after traveling with King Hu to the Cannes Festival to represent A Touch of Zen, she started to regard films as an art form as well. While A Touch of Zen (1971) was still in post production, Hsu starred in a Tu Chung-hsun film called Ten Days in Dragon City (1970) for which she received the Golden Horse Award for Best New Performer. She continued to collaborate with King Hu in a string of films. In The Fate of Lee Khan (1973), The Valiant Ones (1975) and Raining in the Mountain (1979) she was portraying martial artists again and for her role in the ghost story Legend of the Mountain (1979) she received a nomination for the Golden Horse Award for Best Actress.

She won the Golden Horse Award as best actress twice for her performances in Assassin (1976) and The Pioneers (1980).

=== Producing ===
After resigning from her career as an actress in 1981 and a hiatus from the film industry in general, Hsu embarked on a career as producer. She set up her own production company Tomson Films in 1983 and specialized primarily on the production of artistic films. Among others she produced Red Dust (1990), Five Girls and a Rope (1992), Farewell, My Concubine (1993), Red Firecracker, Green Firecracker (1994) and Temptress Moon (1996). For Red Dust she received the Golden Horse Award for the best film. Farewell, My Concubine and Temptress Moon were both directed by Chen Kaige and became international successes. In particular the former received several international awards among them the Palme d'Or (1993), the Golden Globe (1993) and BAFTA (1994) Awards for best foreign film.

=== Other work ===
Hsu served as a member of the jury at the 44th Berlin International Film Festival in 1994 and at the 61st Venice International Film Festival in 2004. 2017 she was awarded a Golden Horse lifetime award for her contributions to Taiwanese cinema.

In Shanghai she oversaw the construction of the Tomson Shanghai International Club luxury complex. After the death of her husband in 2004 she took over the management of his business ventures.

== Personal life ==
In 1976, Hsu married Chinese businessman Tong Cun-lin, with whom she has two sons. At the request of her husband she withdrew from acting in the early 1980s and started to work for her husband's business venture.

== Filmography ==
=== Actress ===
- 1967: Dragon Gate Inn
- 1970: City Called Dragon / Ten Days in Dragon City
- 1971: The Invincible Sword
- 1971: A Touch of Zen
- 1973: White Butterfly Killer
- 1973: Win Them All
- 1973: End of the Black
- 1973: The Fate of Lee Khan
- 1973: My Wife, My Love And My Maid
- 1974: First Come, First Love
- 1974: The Looks of Hong Kong
- 1974: Dragon Fury
- 1974: Chase Step by Step
- 1974: Sex, Love and Hate
- 1974: Everlasting Glory
- 1975: Chinese Amazons
- 1975: Dragon Gate
- 1975: Great Hunter
- 1975: Shaolin Disciples
- 1975: Eight Hundred Heroes
- 1975: The Valiant Ones
- 1976: A Saturday Date
- 1976: Assassin
- 1976: Seven Spirit Pagoda
- 1976: Love in the Twilight Zone
- 1976: A Residence in the Mountains
- 1977: Pai Yu-Ching
- 1977: The Chivalry, the Gunman and Killer
- 1977: The Greatest Plot
- 1977: The Face Behind The Mask
- 1977: Woman of the Hour
- 1977: Deadly Silver Spear
- 1977: To Kill with Intrigue
- 1977: Shaolin Kung Fu Mystagogue
- 1979: The Battle of Ku-ning-tou
- 1979: Raining in the Mountain
- 1979: Legend of the Mountain
- 1980: Mr. Kwong Tung and the Robber
- 1980: Magnificent 72
- 1980: The Lost Kung Fu Secrets
- 1980: The Revenger
- 1980: Eight Escorts
- 1980: The Pioneers
- 1981: The Last Duel

=== Producer ===
- 1976: A Residence in the Mountains
- 1985: Funny Face
- 1985: The Young and Old Wanderers
- 1986: Young Dragons - Kung Fu Kids
- 1986: The Woman of Wrath
- 1986: Young Dragons - Kung Fu Kids II
- 1986: Spring Outside of the Fence)
- 1987: The Game They Called Sex
- 1987: Young Dragons - Kung Fu Kids III
- 1988: Kung Fu Kids Part V: The Adventure of Kung Fu Kids
- 1988: My Dream Is Yours
- 1989: Kung Fu Kids Part VI: Enter the Young Dragon
- 1990: Red Dust
- 1992: Five Girls and a Rope
- 1992: Let Me Speak Up
- 1993: Farewell My Concubine
- 1996: Temptress Moon
- 2004: Shanghai Story
