= Legend of the Mountain =

1979 Taiwanese-Hong Kong film by King Hu

- Film poster

Chinese name
- Traditional Chinese: 山中傳奇
Transcriptions
Standard Mandarin
- Hanyu Pinyin: shān zhōng chuán qí
Yue: Cantonese
- Jyutping: saan1 zung1 cyun4 kei4
- Directed by: King Hu
- Written by: King Hu; Ling Chung
- Produced by: Wong Cheuk-hon; King Hu
- Starring: Shih Chun; Hsu Feng; Sylvia Chang; Tung Lin; Rainbow Hsu
- Cinematography: Henry Chan
- Edited by: King Hu; Siu Nam
- Music by: Wu Ta-chiang
- Production company: Prosperity Film Company
- Release dates: April 1979 (Taiwan); 4 October 1979 (China)
- Running time: 192 minutes
- Countries: Taiwan; Hong Kong
- Language: Standard Chinese
- Box office: HK$734,936

Legend of the Mountain (traditional Chinese: 山中傳奇; simplified Chinese: 山中传奇; Wade–Giles: Shan-chung ch'uan-ch'i) is a 1979 Taiwanese-Hong Kong film directed by King Hu.

== Plot ==
Ho, a young scholar, is given the task for translating Buddhist sutras which are said to have power over the creatures of the afterlife. He travels to a monastery to find a peaceful place to fulfill the task. However he encounters a bizarre cast of characters: a Buddhist lama, Secretary Tsui and his menacing friend Cheng, Cloud and her flute, the mysterious Melody, and Ms. Chang, Melody's mother who soon arranges a marriage between Melody and Ho. However, as he works on the sutras, Ho slowly finds himself entangled on a mysterious plot involving witchcraft, demons, and a battle to preserve his own soul from the attacks of the supernatural underworld.

== Cast ==
- Shih Chun as Ho
- Hsu Feng as Melody
- Sylvia Chang as Cloud
- Tung Lam as Mr. Tsui
- Tien Feng as Cheng
- Chen Hui-lou as Reverend
- Rainbow Hsu as Ms. Chang
- Wu Jiaxiang as Man carrying wood
- Ng Ming Tsui as Lama
- Sun Yueh

== Production ==
In February 1977, King Hu married the Chinese literature professor Chung Ling, just shortly after he had established a new film production company: the King Hu Film Production Company. By May 1977 at a press conference in Hong Kong, Hu announced two projects that would be written by Chung Ling which would become both Raining in the Mountain and Legend of the Mountain. Both films were shot in South Korea due to a new South Korean film program that could provide financial support, as long as the filmmakers taking advantage of it made two film productions.

Legend of the Mountain was a co-production between King Hu's company and Prosperity Film Company, with Wong Cheuk-hon serving as producer. Wong's First Film Organisation had established distribution networks across North America for Chinese-language films during the 1970s.

While King Hu has flirted with supernatural themes with his earlier film A Touch of Zen, Legend of the Mountain was the first film of his that was a full-out ghost story. The story was based on the Song dynasty era story "A Cave of Ghosts on the Western Mountain" which was included in the collection Jingben Popular Stories. Chung Ling emphasized that both King Hu and herself made major alterations to the plot so it should not be viewed as an adaptation of this story, but a reimagining of the original. Some changes, include the addition of Sylvia Chang's character Cloud being added to the story. Chung Ling added that this gave the film a love triangle but would also give more layers of conflict between the characters.

Filming began in August 1977 in South Korea and continued into 1978. Legend of the Mountain went over-budget and the shooting schedule for it was continuously extended. Actress Sylvia Chang said that shooting was difficult as all the exterior locations were in very remote mountain locations which led to actors and crew having to hike up mountain paths for more than forty minutes to get to the shooting location each day. This led to only about two hours of real shooting before the crew having to pack up their equipment making only one or two shots to be completed each day. Several members of the cast also doubled as crew members, such as Ng Ming-choi who was the action choreographer and portrayed the Lama in the film while Shih Chun also worked as the props master.

== Style ==
Richie James Havis of the South Morning China Post said that Legend of the Mountain was not strictly a wuxia, and was "perhaps not a martial arts film at all." Michael Berry said that although Legend of the Mountain is not a traditional wuxia film, it features key spatial and thematic tropes from wuxia films. Berry said that the film "operates in a liminal space between travelogue/road film, thriller, ghost story, wuxia, and even comedy."

== Release ==
Legend in the Mountain was released in April 1979. The films distributor, First Films, cut out a full hour of the running time. It was initially released in Taiwan cut down to a 112-minute runtime. This version was for a long time the most widely circulated on home video. Taiwanese film critic said it performed poorly at the local box office. After the film won awards at the Golden Horse Film Festival, it was re-released in its extended form fourteen months later in Taiwan. The extended version was also screened at Film Festivals outside of Taiwan.

Legend in the Mountain was screened at the 1979 Festival of Festivals in Toronto.

== Reception ==
Earlier Eastern reception had Hong Kong film critic Sek Kei described the film as "further exposing King Hu's tendency toward loose structures," going on to say the version he viewed as "chaotic and without order." Liu Senyao of Dianying shenghuo wrote in 1984 that Legend of the Mountain had a "weak and loose plot structure" that was "simply intolerable!"

From contemporary English reviews, Richard Labonte of the Ottawa Citizen described the film as an "intellectual challenge" and as "three hours of film which never drags" and that it was "structured with a rigid formalism which allows for no spontaneity at all and is also a unique treat, for those who can adapt to a slow and mannered Eastern style rather than the fast-paced and action-packed style of most Western films."

Review aggregator website Rotten Tomatoes retrospectively gave the film an approval rating of 100% based on 7 reviews from western critics, and an average rating of 8.3/10.

From retrospective reviews, a reviewer in The Hollywood Reporter complimented the films "Beautiful settings and eccentric effects work" while saying it was for viewers who were "willing to stretch their attention spans" The reviewer said that the special effects, such as characters disappearing in billowing smoke may appear hokey to modern viewers, it was still a nice change of pace from more overtly CGI-driven battle scenes in contemporary films.

== Awards and nominations ==
Awards and nominations
Ceremony	Category	Recipient	Outcome	Source
16th Golden Horse Awards	Best Feature Film	Legend of the Mountain	Nominated	
16th Golden Horse Awards	Best Director	King Hu	Won	
16th Golden Horse Awards	Best Actor	Shih Chun	Nominated	
16th Golden Horse Awards	Best Actress	Hsu Feng	Nominated	
16th Golden Horse Awards	Best Art Direction	King Hu	Won	
16th Golden Horse Awards	Best Cinematography	Henry Chan	Won	
16th Golden Horse Awards	Best Editing	King Hu	Nominated	
16th Golden Horse Awards	Best Score	Ng Tai Kong	Won	
16th Golden Horse Awards	Best Sound Recording	Zhou Shaolong	Won	
