= Sun Yueh =

Taiwanese actor (1930–2018)

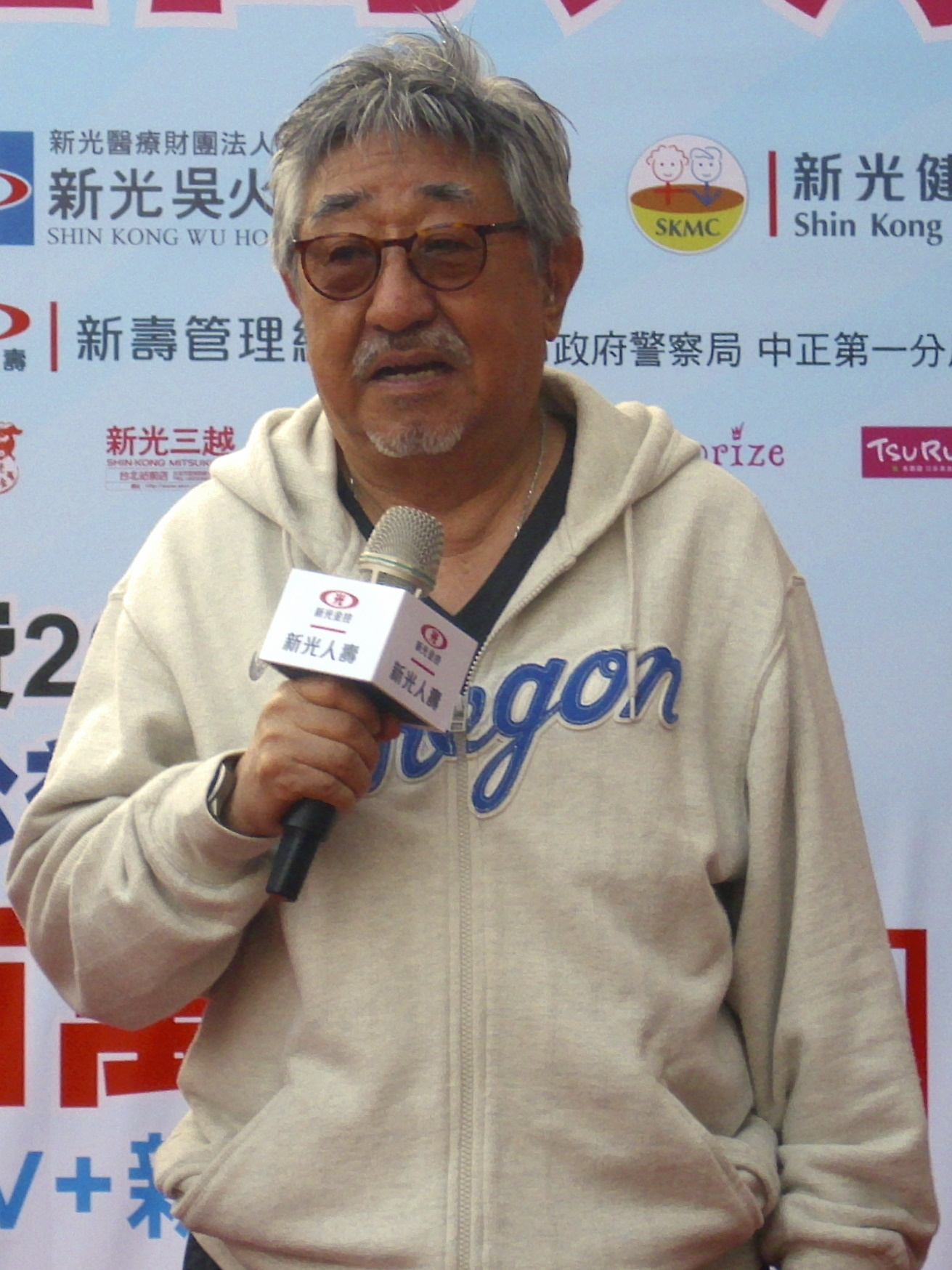
Sun in 2011

Sun Yueh (Chinese: 孫越; pinyin: Sūn Yuè; 26 October 1930 – 1 May 2018) was a Taiwanese actor.

Born in Yuyao, Zhejiang on 26 October 1930, he moved to Taiwan in 1949. Sun appeared in his first film in 1962, and retired in 1989. Over the course of his career, he received the Golden Horse Award for Best Supporting Actor in 1968, and the Golden Horse Award for Best Leading Actor in 1983. Sun stopped smoking after his baptism as a Christian in 1981, and in later life became a humanitarian known for his work with the John Tung Foundation. He cautioned youth against the use of tobacco, and drew attention to ailments related to smoking, namely chronic obstructive pulmonary disease. In 2010, Sun received a Golden Horse Award for special contributions.

Sun underwent treatment for gallstones and chronic obstructive pulmonary disease at National Taiwan University Hospital in March 2018, and died of sepsis and multiple organ failure on 1 May 2018 at the age of 87.

== Selected filmography ==
- Qing ren shi (1964)
- Wu qing de meng (1965)
- Lei bao feng yun (1965)
- Wo nu ruo lan (1966)
- Lang tao sha (1966) - Sun Fu-Kuei
- Qing hai duan chang ren (1966)
- Gu xiang jie (1966)
- Ta li de nu ren (1967) - Master He
- Feng yang hua gu (1967) - Chiao Ta
- Chuang li chuang wai (1967)
- Shi man qing nian shi wan jun (1967) - Japanese Soldier
- Yan zhi hu (1968)
- Po xiao shi fen (1968) - Elder teacher
- Nu luo cao (1968)
- Qing long zhen (1968)
- Zhang men ren (1968)
- Xue cheng (1968) - Chao
- Mu Lian jiu mu (1968)
- Dong nuan (1969) - Lao Chang
- Wu sheng Guan gong (1969)
- Hei nu yu bai se (1969)
- Jian zhong zhi wang (1969)
- Nan dao bei jian (1969)
- Yang Zi Jiang feng yun (1969) - Huang Lin
- Jiang hu ke (1969)
- Fu lu shou (1969)
- Zhang fu yu wo (1969)
- Ba xian guo hai (1969)
- Yi cun xiang si yi cun lei (1969)
- Xie xie zong jing li (1969)
- Wu shi meng (1969)
- Jian bu liu qing (1969)
- Lu ke yu dao ke (1970)
- Zhongqing yi hao (1970)
- Yi feng qing bao bai wan bing (1970)
- Long hu feng yun (1970)
- Ji ren tian xiang (1970)
- Zai jian a lang (1970)
- Jin ye zi (1970)
- Ju bao pen (1970)
- Xue lu xue lu (1970)
- Shen san qi xia (1970)
- Hu ya shan (1970)
- Duo ming yan luo (1970)
- Duan chang hong (1970)
- Ti Ying (1971)
- Huan tian xi di (1971)
- Zhu Hong Wu (1971)
- Gan Luo bai xiang (1971) - Mu Du
- Zui chang de yue hui (1971)
- Xiao ren wu chu tou ji (1971) - Gou Chi-Ying
- Long shang chun hen (1971)
- Tui piao xin niang (1971)
- Pian shu qi tan (1971)
- Hong hu zi (1971)
- Wang shi zhi neng hui wei (1971)
- Lao ye jiu dian (1971)
- The Ammunition Hunters (1971)
- Jian (1971)
- X+Y jiu shi ai (1971)
- Wu fung chao yang (1971)
- Do ming de ren (1971)
- Da mo ying xiong zhuan (1971) - Ah-Erh Fu
- Ai qing yi er san (1971)
- The Champion of Champions (1972) - Tsui Ming-chu
- Pian shu da guan (1972)
- Blood of the Leopard (1972)
- Yi feng san long qin qi hu (1972)
- Meng si hung feng (1972)
- Hua hua shi jie (1972)
- Hei xiang (1972) - Wei Lao-san
- Yi tiao long (1972)
- Shan Dong da jie (1973)
- Qi sha jie (1973)
- Da xiao tong chi (1973)
- Ban jin qi liang (1973)
- Chuang wai (1973)
- Ke xing (1973)
- Zhong guo zhen jui (1973)
- Yi dan (1973)
- Wang feng pao yu (1973)
- Tu bo guo ji si wang xian (1973)
- Tie han jing hun (1973)
- Shi bu liang lì (1973)
- Shen mi nu lang bai ru shuang (1973)
- Pian shu qi zhong qi (1973) - Art dealer Sun
- Nu hao jie (1973)
- Bo ming dan tui (1973)
- Shuang long gu (1974)
- Lao zi you qian (1974)
- Chi qing yu nu (1974) - Wang Yuan
- Da tong ji ling (1974)
- Dong bian qing shi xi bian yu (1974)
- Niu jia da yuan (1974)
- Jin shui lou tai (1974)
- Yi du gong du (1974)
- Xiao nu qi tan (1974)
- Wu long da zhui sha (1974)
- Qiu shi shuang xiong (1974)
- Qin xiong (1974)
- Guangdong hao han (1974)
- Shui gan deng wo (1974)
- Da yin mou (1974)
- Da mo tian ling (1974)
- Da feng bo (1974)
- Chong di yu lai de nu ren (1974)
- Chu zu zuo shou di ren (1974)
- Zei gong ji (1975)
- Yin hai lang zi (1975)
- Bu bu jing hun (1975)
- Lie ren (1975)
- Da jiang nan bei (1975) - Sunglasses
- Ba guo lian jun (1976) - Xiao Li
- Xing qi liu yue hui (1976)
- Shen huan (1976)
- Ta de ba de ma ma de (1976)
- Shen shan hu (1976)
- Xia shi biao ke sha shou (1977)
- Fist of Fury II (1977)
- Da mo mi zong (1977)
- Jiao jiao bing tuan (1977)
- Wan hua tong (1977)
- Shen tui (1977)
- Ren bi ren xiao si ren (1977)
- Kuai dao luan ma zhan (1977)
- Feng piao piao gui piao piao (1977)
- Dan dan san yue qing meng long (1977)
- Zhen bai she zhuan (1978)
- Dai ying xiong (1978)
- Tao tie gong (1979)
- Raining in the Mountain (1979) - Esquire Wen
- Legend of the Mountain (1979) - General Han
- Hu tu fu xing chuang jiang hu (1979)
- Du guo chou cheng (1979)
- Du cheng feng yun (1979)
- Da can quan (1979)
- Xia ying Liu Xiang (1980)
- Tian xia yi da xiao (1980)
- Mo gui ke xing (1980)
- Da xiao jiang jun (1980)
- Xue jian leng ying bao (1980)
- Yue ye zhan (1980)
- Qian wen qian (1981)
- Zhong shen da shi (1981) - Matsumoto (Guest star)
- Zhong Guo nu bing (1981)
- Shen tai mao (1981)
- Shang xing lie che (1981)
- Da xia Wan Pi Bao (1981)
- Sun Wu Kong dai zhan fei ren kuo (1982)
- Fantasy Mission Force (1983) - Old Sun
- Papa, Can You Hear Me Sing (1983) - Uncle Ya
- 1938 Da jing qi (1983) - Boss Inn
- Si sha hai xiu (1983)
- Hei bai zhu (1983)
- Da zhui ji (1983)
- Old Mao's Second Spring (1984) - Lao Mo
- The Time You Need a Friend (1985) - Ku Ren
- Tai Bei shen hua (1985)
- Qi zhi hu li (1985)
- Nie zi (1986)
- City on Fire (1987) - Inspector Lau / Uncle Kung
- Hai xia liang an (1988)
- Lao ke de zui hou yi ge chun tian (1988) - Lee Shih-Ke
- Pedicab Driver (1989) - Fang
- Liang ge you qi jiang (1989) - (final film role)
