= To Kill with Intrigue =

1977 Hong Kong-South Korean film by Lo Wei

- Original film poster

Chinese name
- Traditional Chinese: 劍花煙雨江南
Transcriptions
Standard Mandarin
- Hanyu Pinyin: jiàn huā yān yǔ jiāng nán
Yue: Cantonese
- Jyutping: gim³ faa¹ jin¹ jyu⁵ gong¹ naam⁴
- Directed by: Lo Wei
- Written by: Gu Long
- Produced by: Hsu Li-hwa; Lo Wei
- Starring: Jackie Chan; Hsu Feng; Jeong Hee; George Wang; Chu Feng
- Cinematography: Chen Chong-yuan
- Edited by: Kwok Ting-Hung
- Music by: Frankie Chan
- Production companies: Lo Wei Motion Picture Co., Ltd.
- Distributed by: Lo Wei Motion Picture Company
- Release dates: 22 July 1977 (Hong Kong); 24 September 1977 (South Korea)
- Running time: 106 minutes
- Countries: Hong Kong; South Korea
- Languages: Mandarin; Korean
- Box office: US$254,826 (est.)

To Kill with Intrigue (Chinese: 劍花煙雨江南, Korean: 신당산대형) is a 1977 historical action-drama film directed by Lo Wei. A joint Hong Kong and South Korean co-production with martial arts, revenge and romance film elements, the film stars Hong Kong action movie star Jackie Chan with Taiwanese actress Hsu Feng and South Korean actress Jeong Hee. The movie was filmed in South Korea.

== Plot ==
Ding Can-ren (Hsu Feng) leads a gang known as the Killer Bees on a revenge mission to kill Lei Shao-feng (Jackie Chan) and his family. However, she kills everyone but Lei Shao-feng and falls in love with him.

== Cast ==
- Jackie Chan – as Lei Shao-feng
- Hsu Feng – as Ding Can-ren
- Jeong Hee (credited as Yu Ling Lung) – as Qian-qian (also known as Chin Chin)
- Shin Il-Ryong – as Jin-chuan
- George Wang – as Dragon Escort Master
- Chan Wai Lau – as assassin's chief
- Chan San Yat – as assassin
- To Wai Wo – as assassin
- Yuen Biao – as assassin
- Chin Yuet Sang – as castle guard

== Production ==
Jackie mentions, in his book I Am Jackie Chan, how much of the plot is confusing, and he was sure that even the director, Lo Wei, didn't even know what was going on. He has also gone on to express that the generally cold weather at the time of filming made for a frustrating experience.

== Box office ==
In Hong Kong, the film grossed HK$292,664.90 (US$62,804). In South Korea, it sold 103,265 tickets in Seoul, equivalent to an estimated gross revenue of approximately ₩92,938,500 (US$192,022). This adds up to a total estimated gross of approximately US$254,826 in Hong Kong and Seoul, equivalent to US$1.442 million adjusted for inflation.

== Trivia ==
- For the Japanese release of this film, the name of Chu Feng's character, Chin Chin, had to be changed because Chin Chin is the slang for penis in Japan.

== See also ==
- Jackie Chan filmography
- List of Hong Kong films
- List of martial arts films
- Rurouni Kenshin: Trust & Betrayal (1999), an original video animation series involving similar plot elements
