= The Face Behind the Mask (1977 film) =

1977 Taiwanese film by Chen Chi-hwa

- 龍蛇俠影
- Directed by: Chen Chi-hwa
- Screenplay by: Chang Hsin-yi
- Produced by: Ching Ping Wong
- Starring: Hsu Feng; Elliot Ngok; Lo Lieh
- Cinematography: Chan Wing-shu
- Edited by: Kwok Ting-hung
- Music by: Stanley Chow
- Production company: Chung Wai Motion Picture
- Release date: 1977
- Running time: 93 minutes
- Country: Taiwan
- Language: Mandarin

The Face Behind The Mask (龍蛇俠影) is a 1977 Taiwanese wuxia film directed by Chen Chi-hwa.

== Synopsis ==
Ji Tianwei, the master of a powerful martial arts clan, has defeated his rival Dong Linghu in a duel to determine who would become the next leader of the wulin. Despite losing an arm, Dong Linghu does not hold a grudge against Ji Tianwei, who is so touched that he becomes friends with Dong Linghu. Just as Ji Tianwei is about to assume the leadership position, his enemies come to cause trouble one after the other. Ji Tianwei and his apprentices manage to fend off their enemies.

Leng Yanqing and Xiao Mengfei, two of Ji Tianwei's apprentices, have affections for their master's daughter, Ji Mudan. However, Ji Mudan only loves Xiao Mengfei. Leng Yanqing, feeling neglected, secretly keeps Ji Mudan's handkerchief.

Since the last attack, Ji Tianwei has been suspecting that there is a spy in the clan who has been leaking information to their enemies. At one point, Leng Yanqing is wrongly accused of being the spy and gets expelled from the clan. Feeling guilty for causing his senior's expulsion, Xiao Mengfei lies that he is the spy. However, everything turns out to be a ruse. Ji Tianwei had pretended to expel Leng Yanqing in order to draw out the real spy, who is revealed to be Dong Linghu.

Ji Tianwei finally defeats Dong Linghu in a final duel. Leng Yanqing, mortally wounded in the battle, confesses his love to Ji Mudan with his dying breath and shows her the handkerchief he has kept all this time.

== Cast ==
- Hsu Feng as Ji Mudan
- Elliot Ngok as Xiao Mengfei
- Lo Lieh as Leng Yanqing
- Woo Kei as Ji Tianwei
- Go Ming as Dong Linghu
