= The Fate of Lee Khan =

1973 Hong Kong film by King Hu

- Original Hong Kong film poster

Chinese name
- Traditional Chinese: 迎春閣之風波
- Simplified Chinese: 迎春阁之风波
- Literal meaning: The Turbulence at Yingchun Pavilion
Transcriptions
Standard Mandarin
- Hanyu Pinyin: Yíngchūn gé zhī fēngbō
Yue: Cantonese
- Jyutping: Jing^{4} ceon^{1} gok^{3} zi^{1} fung^{1}bo^{1}
- Directed by: King Hu
- Written by: King Hu; Wang Chung
- Produced by: Raymond Chow
- Starring: Li Li-hua; Roy Chiao; Hsu Feng; Ying Bai; Tien Feng
- Cinematography: Chen Chao-yung
- Edited by: Liang Yung-tsan
- Music by: Joseph Koo
- Production companies: King Hu Film Productions; Golden Harvest Company
- Distributed by: Golden Harvest
- Release date: 6 December 1973 (HK)
- Country: Hong Kong
- Language: Mandarin

The Fate of Lee Khan (Chinese: 迎春閣之風波; lit. 'The Turbulence at Yingchun Pavilion') is a 1973 Hong Kong wuxia film directed and co-written by King Hu, with action choreography by Sammo Hung, and starring Li Li-hua, Roy Chiao, Hsu Feng, Tien Feng and Angela Mao. It was produced by Golden Harvest, and released on 6 December 1973.

== Plot ==
During the waning years of the Yuan Dynasty, Mongol general Lee Khan and his sister Wan’er travel to the desolate Spring Inn in Shaanxi province to obtain a map of the tactical plans of the rebel forces. Aided by Wan Jen-Mi, innkeeper of the Spring Inn, a group of undercover resistance fighters seek to recover the map to save the rebellion.

== Cast ==
- Li Li-Hua as Wan Jen-mi
- Roy Chiao as Tsao Yu-kun
- Hsu Feng as Lee Wan-erh
- Ying Bai as Wang Shih Cheng
- Tien Feng as Lee Khan
- Angela Mao as Hai Mu-tan
- Hu Chin as Shui Mi-tao
- Helen Ma as Yeh Li-Hsiang
- Nan Chiang as Liu San-Hu
- Han Ying-chieh as Sha Yuan Shan
- Chia-hsiang Wu as Tavern manager Liu

Cast adapted from the 2019 Masters of Cinema blu-ray.

== Analysis ==
The film is one of the Chinese action films that helped encourage that there be more female action roles.

The director King Hu used methods of framing to show action scenes in detail. Close to the end of the film, the director used cutting patterns and edge framing to show how similar all of the fighters' moves are. Hu also filmed The Fate of Lee Khan back to back with The Valiant Ones.

== Release ==
The Fate of Lee Khan was distributed in Hong Kong on December 6, 1973.

== Reception ==
From contemporary reviews, Tony Rayns reviewed The Fate of Lee Khan in Sight & Sound finding the film "always strikingly beautiful" and that its "bald narrative outline risks suggesting that Lee Khan would sit more comfortably within the Chinese martial arts genre than in fact it does. Its vividly stylised clashes" were "far from being the film's raison d'etre as they are from being mere set-pieces.". Rayns concluded that the film was a "remarkable achievement, and not just by the standards of Hong Kong cinema. One can only hope that its appearance here (mercifully subtitled, not dubbed) may herald more of King Hu's work." Verina Glessner of the Monthly Film Bulletin stated that director King Hu "comes closest of all currently active Chinese directors to fitting our notion of an art film director" noting that he "isn't averse to check-mating audience expectations as much as his characters' moves." Glessner also noted the script by King Hu and Wang Chung that "like the direction and the gallery of camero [sic?] performances, shows a rare sharpness and sophistication."

From retrospective reviews, Michael Brooke wrote in Sight & Sound once the film is set up it was as "taut as any Hitchcock or Clouzot suspense. Violent action erupts out of nowhere and ends almost as quickly as it began- at least, until the final pitched battle which is also the film's only really prolonged exterior scene." Glenn Kenny of the New York Times made the film his "New York Times Critic's Pic" and stated that the film " falls into a sweet lather, rinse, repeat mode of scenes, alternating character intrigue and fighting."
