= Wong Cheuk-hon =

Hong Kong film producer and director (1920–2004)

- 黃卓漢
- Born: 25 January 1920; Chaozhou, Guangdong, China
- Died: 8 October 2004 (aged 84); Hong Kong
- Other name: "十頂全能" (Ten-Hat Expert)
- Occupations: Film producer; director; screenwriter; distributor; theater operator
- Years active: 1949–1994
- Known for: Pioneering Hong Kong–Korea film co-productions; First 35mm color films in Hong Kong and Taiwan
- Notable work: Master of the Flying Guillotine (1976); Legend of the Mountain (1979); Raining in the Mountain (1979); Red Rose White Rose (1994)
- Spouse: Ling-Ying Wong (Linda)
- Children: Multiple
- Awards: Golden Horse Award for Lifetime Achievement (1993)

Wong Cheuk-hon (Chinese: 黃卓漢; pinyin: Huáng Zhuóhàn; 25 January 1920 – 8 October 2004) was a Hong Kong film producer, director, screenwriter, and distributor who played a significant role in the development of Chinese-language cinema across Hong Kong, Taiwan, and South Korea. Known by the nickname "十頂全能" (Ten-Hat Expert) for his versatility in wearing multiple hats as producer, writer, director, cinematographer, and editor, Wong's career spanned more than four decades and encompassed the production of over 200 films and distribution of more than 1,000 titles.

Wong is recognized as a pioneer of Hong Kong–Korea film co-productions, having initiated collaborative filmmaking between the two industries in the late 1950s, decades before such transnational partnerships became commonplace in Asian cinema. He was also responsible for introducing technical innovations, producing Hong Kong's first 35mm color film in 1957 and Taiwan's first 35mm color film in 1958. As founder of First Film Organisation, which became Taiwan's fourth-largest film production company by the 1970s, Wong helped shape the island's commercial film industry and facilitated the production of internationally acclaimed works by director King Hu. His production of Master of the Flying Guillotine (1976), directed by Jimmy Wang Yu, has achieved enduring cult status and was cited by Quentin Tarantino as one of his favorite films.

Wong received the Lifetime Achievement Award at the 30th Golden Horse Awards in 1993 in recognition of his contributions to Chinese-language cinema. He was survived by his wife Ling-Ying Wong (Linda), with whom he had multiple children and grandchildren.

== Early life and education ==
Wong Cheuk-hon was born on 25 January 1920 in Chaozhou, Guangdong Province, China. He pursued higher education in law, graduating from Guangdong National University (廣東國民大學) with a bachelor's degree in law (法學士). Prior to the Second Sino-Japanese War, Wong worked as a teacher at the Vietnamese Overseas Chinese School (越南華僑中學), contributing to the education of the ethnic Chinese diaspora in Vietnam.

== Wartime service and journalism career ==
During the Second Sino-Japanese War, Wong served in the Kuomintang government, first as a member of the Books and Magazines Committee (圖書雜誌委員會) in Guangxi, which was responsible for wartime cultural and propaganda work. He later rose to the rank of Lieutenant Colonel Secretary (中校秘書) at the Ministry of National Defense Political Department (國防部總政治部) in Chongqing, the wartime capital of Nationalist China.

Following Japan's surrender in 1945, Wong transitioned to journalism, serving as Deputy Editor-in-Chief and Interview Director (副總編輯兼採訪主任) at Yishi Bao (益世報) in Nanjing, one of China's major Catholic newspapers. In 1949, amid the Chinese Civil War and the impending Communist victory, Wong relocated to Hong Kong, where he initially attempted to establish a newspaper. When this venture proved unsuccessful, he turned to the film industry, a decision that would define the remainder of his professional life.

== Film career ==
=== Early years and Cantonese film production (1949–1952) ===
Wong entered the film industry by becoming manager of China Theatre (中華戲院), a cinema in Hong Kong. Through this position, he gained firsthand knowledge of audience preferences and the commercial film market. During this period, he discovered Chin Chien (秦劍), who would become a significant Cantonese film director. Wong produced twelve Cantonese films during this initial phase, including A Mother's Tears (慈母淚), establishing himself as a film producer.

=== Liberty Film Company and technical innovations (1952–1958) ===
In 1952, Wong founded Liberty Film Company (自由影業公司) to produce Mandarin-language films, reflecting the commercial potential of this market segment. The company's first production was The Secret Life of Lady So Lee (名女人別傳, 1953), starring Helen Li Mei (李湄).

Wong demonstrated an eye for discovering talent, establishing actor training classes in 1954 and discovering Jeanette Lin Tsui (林翠), whom he cast in Sweet Seventeen (女兒心), launching her career as one of Hong Kong's most popular actresses of the 1950s and 1960s.

Wong became the first Hong Kong filmmaker to shoot productions in Taiwan in 1956, producing Princess of Sun Moon Lake (日月潭之戀) and Remote Love (馬車伕之戀), which showcased the island's scenic locations.

The following year, Wong achieved a significant technical milestone with The Dragon Lady (龍女, 1957), which became Hong Kong's first 35mm color film. Wong invited a Japanese cinematographer to bring the necessary expertise for this technically challenging production. He followed this achievement with Miss Chow Shun (甘蔗姑娘, 1958), shot at sugarcane plantations in Taiwan, which became that territory's first 35mm color film. However, the film's failure in overseas distribution markets led to Liberty Film Company's bankruptcy.

=== Lan Kwong Film Company (1959–1966) ===
Undeterred by this setback, Wong founded Lan Kwong Film Company (嶺光影業公司) in 1959, returning to Cantonese-language production. Over the next seven years, the company produced 53 films, primarily contemporary satirical comedies that reflected urban Hong Kong life. Notable productions included Ten Schoolgirls (十大姐, 1960), Three Love Affairs (工廠皇后, 1963), Two City Girls (都市兩女性, 1963), and Diary of a Husband (大丈夫日記, 1964).

During this period, Wong continued to identify and nurture acting talent. He discovered Ting Ying (丁瑩), Paul Chu (朱江), and Cheung Yee (張儀), all of whom became established performers in Hong Kong cinema. In 1964, Wong discovered Alan Tang (鄧光榮) while Tang was still a student, casting him in The Student Prince (學生王子). Tang would later become one of Hong Kong's most popular leading men and a successful film producer in his own right. Wong also discovered Helena Law Lan (羅蘭), who achieved lasting fame as a character actress and became affectionately known as "Auntie Law" by later generations of audiences.

In his memoir, Wong recalled a memorable moment from this period: visiting Victoria Theatre in Central during the opening day of Woman's Affairs (1961), a Lan Kwong comedy directed by Mok Hong-si. Upon arriving at the box office, Wong heard loud rumbling from the cinema house above—the sound of audience members stomping their feet, overcome with laughter at the film's comedy. The success of this film helped establish Mok's distinctive brand of comedy for Lan Kwong.

=== Pioneering Hong Kong–Korea co-productions (1958–1967) ===
Wong's most historically significant contribution to Asian cinema may be his pioneering role in establishing collaborative filmmaking between Hong Kong and South Korea. According to both the Hong Kong Film Archive and the Korean Film Archive, Wong "opened the door" (開創與韓國影界合作的先河) for cooperation between the two film industries, initiating a pattern of transnational production that would later become widespread in Asian cinema.

Wong's first Korea co-production was Because I Love You (因為愛你, 1958), a collaboration with Korean producer Lim Hwa-soo (林華秀) and directed by the prominent Korean filmmaker Han Hyung-mo. This was followed by the song-and-dance film Stars and Moon (星月爭輝, 1959).

The most ambitious of Wong's Korea co-productions was The Flaming Mountain (火燄山, 1962), also known by its alternative title Monkey King (齊天大聖). Co-produced with Hanyang Films (漢陽映畫社), the film holds the distinction of being Hong Kong's first widescreen Eastmancolor Cantonese-language film. The production was co-directed by the distinguished Korean filmmaker Kim Soo-yong (金洙容) and featured major Korean stars including Choi Mu-ryong (崔戊龍), who had won Best Actor at the Asia-Pacific Film Festival, and Kim Ji-mi (金芝美), who had received Best Actress honors. The film was produced in Cantonese, Mandarin, and Korean language versions, reflecting its pan-Asian ambitions, and achieved major box office success in South Korea.

Wong continued his Korea co-productions with SOS Hong Kong (1966), directed by Choi Gyeong-ok, International Spy (國際女間諜, 1967), and the large-scale war film 509 Tank Forces (神勇坦克隊, 1967), directed by Kim Dong-hak.

=== First Film Organisation and Taiwan expansion (1967–1990s) ===
In 1967, Wong founded First Film Organisation Limited (第一影業機構有限公司), registered in Hong Kong but with its primary production base in Taiwan. Wong is credited with introducing the wuxia martial arts genre to Taiwan cinema with Crazy Swordsman (大瘋俠, 1968), which he wrote and directed personally.

By the 1970s, First Film Organisation had grown to become Taiwan's fourth-largest film production company. Wong recruited prominent action stars including Jimmy Wang Yu (王羽), Chen Sing (陳星), Polly Shang-kuan Ling-feng (上官靈鳳), and Japanese martial artist Kurata Yasuaki (倉田保昭).

==== Grindhouse martial arts productions ====
Wong's First Film Organisation became a prolific producer of martial arts films that found enthusiastic audiences on the international grindhouse circuit. Furious Slaughter (霸王拳, 1972), starring Jimmy Wang Yu as a fedora-wearing hero battling human traffickers in 1930s China, has been described by critics as "Wang Yu's finest hour" and "a fast-paced action classic" that exemplifies the brutal, no-holds-barred style of early 1970s kung fu cinema. The film's relentless fight sequences and social justice themes made it a favorite among martial arts enthusiasts, and it remains a sought-after title among collectors of vintage kung fu cinema.

Wong followed Furious Slaughter with A Gathering of Heroes (趕盡殺絕, 1973), further cementing First Film's reputation as a reliable source of action entertainment. The company also produced diverse genre films including the song-and-dance picture Song King, Song Queen (歌王歌后, 1970), the Chiung Yao romantic drama adaptation Fantasies Behind the Pearly Curtain (一簾幽夢, 1975), and the supernatural thriller The Ghost and the Mirror (古鏡幽魂, 1974).

==== Master of the Flying Guillotine ====
Wong's collaboration with Jimmy Wang Yu yielded one of the most enduring cult films of the martial arts genre. Master of the Flying Guillotine (獨臂拳王大破血滴子, 1976), a sequel to Wang's One-Armed Boxer, was produced by Wong and directed by and starring Wang Yu. The film featured Wang reprising his role as a one-armed martial artist defending himself against a blind assassin wielding the deadly flying guillotine weapon.

The film has achieved legendary status among cult film enthusiasts worldwide. Director Quentin Tarantino has repeatedly cited Master of the Flying Guillotine as one of his favorite films of all time, and its influence can be detected in his own work. The film is particularly celebrated for its inventive martial arts sequences, featuring fighters with diverse and outlandish skills including a yoga master with extendable arms, and for its unauthorized use of Krautrock music from German bands including Neu!, Tangerine Dream, and Kraftwerk—a soundtrack choice that has itself become iconic. Master of the Flying Guillotine has been called "the pinnacle of 1970s martial arts films" and continues to screen at repertory cinemas and genre festivals internationally.

=== King Hu collaborations and critical acclaim ===
Wong's most artistically significant productions came through his collaboration with the legendary director King Hu, widely regarded as one of the greatest filmmakers in Chinese cinema history. In 1979, Wong served as executive producer on two films that Hu shot back-to-back in South Korea: Legend of the Mountain (山中傳奇) and Raining in the Mountain (空山靈雨).

Both films were initially released in truncated versions and received limited theatrical distribution, but they have undergone dramatic critical reappraisal in recent decades. Beginning in the late 2010s, the Taiwan Film Institute undertook comprehensive 4K restorations of both works. Legend of the Mountain was restored to its complete three-hour director's cut—a version that had never been commercially released—and debuted at the Venice Film Festival before receiving international theatrical and home video distribution through Kino Lorber (North America) and Eureka Entertainment's Masters of Cinema series (United Kingdom).

Raining in the Mountain received similar restoration treatment and was released on the Criterion Channel, Film Movement, and Eureka's Masters of Cinema series. The New York Times hailed the restoration as "spectacular, exhilarating entertainment," while Sight & Sound praised the film as "breathtakingly beautiful." At the 24th Hong Kong Film Awards, various Asian film critics, filmmakers, and actors voted Raining in the Mountain among the top 100 Chinese-language films, ranking it 59th on the list.

These restorations have secured Wong's legacy as a producer who enabled the creation of works now considered essential viewing for students of Asian cinema. Legend of the Mountain in particular has been called a "fantasy masterpiece" and compared favorably to Stanley Kubrick's 2001: A Space Odyssey for its transcendent qualities.

=== Later productions and North American distribution ===
Throughout the 1970s and 1980s, Wong expanded his business interests to include cinema circuits in Taiwan and theaters featuring Chinese films in six cities across the United States and Canada, facilitating the distribution of Asian cinema to overseas audiences.

Wong continued to invest in notable Hong Kong productions into the 1990s, including Thunder Cops II (1989) and the acclaimed Red Rose White Rose (紅玫瑰白玫瑰, 1994). The latter film, directed by Stanley Kwan and based on a novella by Eileen Chang, starred Joan Chen and Winston Chao and was selected to compete at the 45th Berlin International Film Festival. Shot by acclaimed cinematographer Christopher Doyle, Red Rose White Rose has been praised as Kwan's "most emotionally resonant and deeply realized work" and the most successful screen adaptation of Eileen Chang's literary work.

Wong also produced Dr. Sun Yat-sen and the Founding Heroes (國父孫中山與開國英雄, 1986), a large-scale historical production that featured dozens of Hong Kong and Taiwan film stars.

== Personal life ==
Wong Cheuk-hon was married to Ling-Ying Wong (Linda), with whom he had multiple children. At the time of his death in 2004, Wong was survived by his wife, children, and grandchildren.

Wong died on 8 October 2004 in Hong Kong at the age of 84, leaving behind a legacy that spanned more than five decades of Chinese-language cinema.

== Legacy ==
Wong Cheuk-hon's contributions to Chinese-language cinema were multifaceted. As a pioneer of Hong Kong–Korea co-productions, he helped establish patterns of transnational collaboration that would become increasingly important in Asian cinema. His technical innovations—producing Hong Kong's and Taiwan's first 35mm color films—demonstrated a commitment to advancing the craft of filmmaking. His talent for discovering and nurturing performers launched numerous careers that shaped Hong Kong cinema for decades.

Wong's productions for First Film Organisation have achieved lasting significance across multiple registers. Master of the Flying Guillotine demonstrated his ability to create commercially successful genre entertainment that achieved cult classic status and influenced subsequent generations of filmmakers, while his collaborations with King Hu on Legend of the Mountain and Raining in the Mountain resulted in works now considered essential masterpieces of Asian cinema. The recent 4K restorations and releases by prestigious distributors including Criterion, Kino Lorber, and Eureka's Masters of Cinema have introduced these films to new audiences and cemented their place in the canon of world cinema.

His receipt of the Golden Horse Lifetime Achievement Award in 1993 represented formal recognition from the Taiwanese film industry of his decades-long contributions to Chinese-language cinema across multiple territories and genres.

== Selected filmography ==
=== As producer ===
Year	Title	Chinese title	Notes
1953	The Secret Life of Lady So Lee	名女人別傳	First Mandarin production
1954	Sweet Seventeen	女兒心	Launched Jeanette Lin Tsui's career
1957	The Dragon Lady	龍女	Hong Kong's first 35mm color film
1958	Miss Chow Shun	甘蔗姑娘	Taiwan's first 35mm color film
1958	Because I Love You	因為愛你	First Hong Kong–Korea co-production
1962	The Flaming Mountain	火燄山	First HK widescreen Eastmancolor Cantonese film; co-produced with Korea
1964	The Student Prince	學生王子	Launched Alan Tang's career
1968	Crazy Swordsman	大瘋俠	Introduced wuxia to Taiwan cinema
1972	Furious Slaughter	霸王拳	Grindhouse martial arts classic; starring Jimmy Wang Yu
1973	A Gathering of Heroes	趕盡殺絕	Martial arts
1975	Fantasies Behind the Pearly Curtain	一簾幽夢	Chiung Yao adaptation
1976	Master of the Flying Guillotine	獨臂拳王大破血滴子	Cult classic; directed by and starring Jimmy Wang Yu; cited by Quentin Tarantino as one of his favorite films
1979	Legend of the Mountain	山中傳奇	Executive producer; directed by King Hu; 4K restoration by Taiwan Film Institute
1979	Raining in the Mountain	空山靈雨	Executive producer; directed by King Hu; 4K restoration; voted top 100 Chinese-language films
1986	Dr. Sun Yat-sen and the Founding Heroes	國父孫中山與開國英雄	
1994	Red Rose White Rose	紅玫瑰白玫瑰	Directed by Stanley Kwan; Berlin Film Festival competition

=== As director ===
Year	Title	Chinese title	Notes
1958	Little Wild Cat	小野貓	
1963	Love Tide of the Fragrant Sea	香海情潮	
1968	Crazy Swordsman	大瘋俠	Also wrote screenplay; introduced wuxia to Taiwan

Wong directed a total of 14 films during his career.

== Awards and honors ==
Year	Award	Category	Result
1993	30th Golden Horse Awards	Lifetime Achievement Special Award	Won

== Publications ==
Wong published his autobiography in 1994, providing a firsthand account of his five decades in the film industry:

- Wong, Cheuk-hon (1994). 電影人生: 黃卓漢回憶錄 [Film Life: Wong Cheuk-hon's Memoir] (in Chinese). Taipei: Wan Hsiang Books (萬象圖書股份有限公司).

The memoir contains personal anecdotes about Wong's productions, his collaborations with directors and actors, and behind-the-scenes accounts of the Hong Kong and Taiwan film industries during their formative years. Scholars at the Hong Kong Film Archive have cited the memoir as a primary source for research on Cantonese cinema of the 1960s, drawing on Wong's recollections of events such as the reception of Lan Kwong Film Company productions. The book remains a valuable resource for researchers studying the development of Chinese-language cinema, Hong Kong–Korea co-productions, and the business operations of independent film companies during the postwar era.

As the memoir was published in limited circulation in Taiwan in 1994, physical copies may be accessible at the National Central Library in Taipei, the Hong Kong Film Archive, and select academic libraries with Chinese-language film collections.
