= Roy Chiao =

Hong Kong actor (1927–1999)

- Chiao in Indiana Jones and the Temple of Doom (1984).
- Born: 16 March 1927; Shanghai, China
- Died: 15 April 1999 (aged 72); Seattle, Washington, U.S.
- Occupation: Actor
- Years active: 1950–1999
- Awards: Hong Kong Film Awards – Best Actor; 1996 Summer Snow Golden Bauhinia Awards – Best Actor; 1996 Summer Snow

Chinese name
- Traditional Chinese: 喬宏
- Simplified Chinese: 乔宏
Transcriptions
Standard Mandarin
- Hanyu Pinyin: Qiáo Hóng
Yue: Cantonese
- Jyutping: Kiu4 wang4
- Military career
- Allegiance: United States
- Branch: United States Army
- Rank: Captain
- Conflicts: Korean War

Roy Chiao Hung (Chinese: 喬宏; 16 March 1927 – 15 April 1999) was a Hong Kong-American actor. Nicknamed "the Lion of Cinema" for his athletic physical stature and powerful screen presence, he was a popular leading man throughout the 1950s and '60s, and continued his acting career well into the 1990s. He was an early star of wuxia films associated with the Hong Kong New Wave, thanks to his roles in A Touch of Zen (1971) and The Fate of Lee Khan (1973), both directed by King Hu.

His deep voice and fluency in multiple languages, including English, also made him a popular actor for Western filmmakers working in Hong Kong. He notably played supporting roles in Ferry to Hong Kong (1959), Enter the Dragon (1973), Indiana Jones and the Temple of Doom (1984), The Protector (1985) and Bloodsport (1988). He won the Hong Kong Film Award for Best Actor for his performance in the 1996 Ann Hui film Summer Snow.

== Early life ==
Chiao was born in Shanghai in 1927. His father, Qiao Yisheng, was a supporter of Sun Yat-sen and was part of the 1911 Revolution. Chiao attended an American missionary school as a child, where he became fluent in English. He moved to Chongqing during the Second Sino-Japanese War, but moved back after the end of World War II to complete his secondary education.

During the Korean War, Chiao went to Taiwan, and subsequently enlisted in the United States Army. A polyglot fluent in several languages (Mandarin, Cantonese, Shanghainese, English and Japanese among them), Chiao served as a battlefield interpreter. After the war, he was a part of the United States' negotiation delegation. He was discharged in 1954, as a captain.

== Career ==
In 1955, he went to Japan and there he met actress Bai Guang who cast him in the 1956 film Xian mu dan.

The English speaking film appearances that Chiao appeared in included roles in the 1984 Harrison Ford film Indiana Jones and the Temple of Doom, the 1988 Jean-Claude Van Damme film Bloodsport, the 1973 Bruce Lee film Enter the Dragon and the 1978 version of Lee's Game of Death. He performed in many Hong Kong films with a career total of 90 films.

=== 1950s to 1960s ===
Chiao's screen debut was in the 1956 film Xian mu dan which came about as a result of his meeting actress Bai Guang. She had cast him in the film. On her recommendation he went to MP&GI in 1957 and that year he was signed to them.

Recognized as a handsome leading man, in the 1959 film, Ferry to Hong Kong, Chiao played the part of the Americanized Johnny Sing-Up, a black leather jacket, blue jean wearing Elvis styled gangster from America. Sing-Up was the partner of a pirate called Yen (played by Milton Reid) who board a ferry that has been battered in a storm and drifting near the China Coast.

=== 1970s to 1999 ===
In a type of send-up of his award-winning role in Summer Snow, Chiao played the part of the Alzheimer disease stricken grandfather of Tung Tzun in the 1996 film Blind Romance. He had suffered from three heart attacks and died of heart disease.

== Personal life ==
Chiao married Liu Yen-Ping when he was in his twenties. She was a disc-jockey. Both he and his wife were Christians. In 1964 he and his wife immigrated to Seattle. In his later years he became involved in missionary work.

He was the founder of "Artists' Home," a Christian Fellowship for actors in Hong Kong. Singer-songwriter Zac Kao is one of the people who have been positively affected by Chiao.

== Death ==
Chiao suffered three heart attacks before his heart disease-related death in 1999.

== Selected filmography ==
- Happenings in Ali Shan (1950)
- Heng chong zhi zhuang (1950)
- Xian mu dan (1959)
- Qing chun er nu (1959) – Niu Mai (Buffalo)
- San xing ban yue (1959) – Chang Ping-chung
- Air Hostess (Kong zhong xiao jie) (1959) – Lei Daying
- Ferry to Hong Kong (1959) – Johnny Sing-Up
- Tian chang di jiu (1959)
- Lan gui feng yun (1959)
- Liu yue xin niang (1960) – Mai Qin
- Chang tui jie jie (1960) – Xiao Jin / Jin Junior
- Nu mi shu yan shi (1960)
- Mu yu nu (1960) – Yuan Zhitang
- Xin xin xiang yin (1960)
- Kuai le tian shi (1960) – Jin Wenou
- Tie bi jin gang (1960)
- Hong nan lu nu (1960)
- Yu lou san feng (1960) – Zheng Dajiang
- Sha ji chong chong (1960) – Luo Shouli
- Zei mei ren (1961)
- You xi ren jian (1961)
- Tao li zheng chun (1962) – Xu Zhaofeng
- Huo zhong lian (1962) – Tian Shaoqing
- Ye hua lian (1962)
- Ladies First (Hǎo shì chéng shuāng) (1962) – Wang Shu
- Jiao wo ru he bu xiang ta (1963) – Jin Shiming
- Die hai si zhuang shi (1963)
- Xi Taihou yu Zhen Fei (1964)
- Ti xiao yin yuan shang ji (1964) – Liu – The Warlord General
- Ti xiao yin yuan xia ji (1964) – Liu – The Warlord General
- Shen gong yuan (1964) – Hong Chengchou
- Luan shi er nu (1966) – Ma Jen-shan
- Bai tian e (1967)
- Five Golden Dragons (1967) – Inspector Chiao
- Wo de ai ren jiu shi ni (1967) – Ling Chi Chiu
- Jue dou e hu ling (1968) – Diao Jinghu
- Yan ling dao (1968) – 2nd Chief Yueh
- The Arch (1968) – Captain Yang
- You long xi feng (1968)
- Hu shan hang (1969) – Ching Wu Chih
- Jia bu jia (1970) – (Guest star)
- Xue lu xue lu (1970) – Driver
- A Touch of Zen (1971) – Hui Yuan
- Cheating Panorama (1972)
- Hei lung (1973)
- Enter the Dragon (1973) – Shaolin Abbott (uncredited)
- The Fate of Lee Khan (1973) – Tsao Yu-kun
- Pian shu qi zhong qi (1973) – Fur coat grifter
- Hen ye qing deng (1974)
- Golden Needles (1974) – Lin Toa
- Games Gamblers Play (1974) – Ticketed Man at Bar (Guest star)
- Yinyang jie (1974)
- Yun cai tong zi xiao zu zong (1974)
- Zhong lie tu (1975) – Yu Da-you
- Lao fu zi (1975)
- The Last Message (1975) – Cheng Ming
- Tian cai yu bai chi (1975) – Mr. Chiang Wo
- Lan qiao yue leng (1975)
- Da jia le (1975)
- Zhong yuan biao ju (1976) – (Guest star)
- Yi qi guang gun zou tian ya (1977)
- Foxbat (1977) – Doctor Vod
- Da sha xing yu xiao mei tou (1978) – Drunken Sheng
- Game of Death (1978) – Henry Lo
- Wen ni pa wei (1978)
- Enter the Fat Dragon (1978) – Chiu
- Shen tou miao tan shou duo duo (1979) – Biggie
- Meng zai Sha mei miao zhen tan (1979)
- Huang shi shi (1979) – (Guest star)
- Bo za (1980) – White Norman
- Yi er san (1980)
- Shi ba (1980) – Chu Tung Shen
- Game of Death 2 (1981) – Abbot
- Da li xiao shui shou (1981)
- Chuang ban shen tan dian zi gui (1981)
- Once Upon a Mirage (1982) – Policeman Ma
- Chiu pei nui hok sang (1982)
- Meng (1983)
- Feng shui er shi nian (1983) – (Cameo)
- Indiana Jones and the Temple of Doom (1984) – Lao Che
- Ge wu sheng ping (1985)
- The Protector (1985) – Harold Ko
- Heart of Dragon (1985) – Restaurant Owner
- Aces Go Places IV (1986) – The Professor
- Wu long da jia ting (1986)
- Righting Wrongs (1986) – Magistrate Judge
- Inspector Chocolate (1986) – Captain K.W. Wu
- Zhao hua xi shi (1987)
- Dragons Forever (1988) – Judge Lo Chung-Wai
- Bloodsport (1988) – Senzo Tanaka
- Fa da xian sheng (1989)
- Lady Reporter (1989)
- Long zhi zheng ba (1989) – Hwa's father
- Shadow of China (1989) – Lee Hok Chow
- Do wong (1990)
- Bamboo in Winter (1991) – Father
- A Kid from Tibet (1992) – Lawyer Robinson
- Cageman (1992) – Koo Yiu-Cho
- Treasure Hunt (1994) – Uncle Bill
- Mr. X (1995) – Roy
- Summer Snow (1995) – Lin Sun
- Dai lo bai sau (1995) – Great Uncle
- Ma ma fan fan (1995) – Death
- Tou tou ai ni (1996) – Tung-Tung's Grandfather
- All's Well, Ends Well 1997 (1997) – Mr. Lo
- Tin sai ji shing (1999) – Uncle Wang (final film role)

Awards and achievements
Preceded by Tony Leung Chiu-Wai for Chungking Express	Hong Kong Film Awards for Best Actor; 1996 for Summer Snow	Succeeded by Kent Cheng for The Log
