= Liu yue xin niang =

1960 Hong Kong film by Tang Huang

- Directed by: Tang Huang
- Screenplay by: Eileen Chang
- Starring: Grace Chang; Yang Chang; Roy Chiao
- Cinematography: Huang Ming
- Production company: Motion Picture & General Investment
- Release date: 27 January 1960 (Hong Kong)

Liu yue xin niang (aka June Bride) is a 1960 Hong Kong musical romantic comedy film written by Eileen Chang and directed by Tang Huang.

== Plot ==
Grace Chang stars as Wang Tanlin, a young woman who has some doubts about her would-be fiancé. She sets sail on an ocean liner to iron things out and see once and for all whether he can be trusted.

== Cast ==
- Grace Chang as Wang Danlin
- Yang Chang as Dong Jifang
- Roy Chiao as Mai Qin
- Hao Ding as Bai Jin
- Enjia Liu as Mr. Wang
