= Chase Step by Step =

Chase Step by Step 步步追杀 Taiwanese: Bu bu zhui zong
- Directed by: Yu Min Sheong
- Written by: Yang Hsiang
- Produced by: C.Y. Yang (producer); T.K. Yang (producer)
- Starring: See below
- Cinematography: Hsin Chuan Huang
- Production companies: Hai Hua Cinema Company; Lee Ming Film Company
- Distributed by: Mill Creek Entertainment (2005) USA DVD; Ocean Shores Video (1982) worldwide VHS
- Release date: 1974
- Running time: 82 minutes (USA)
- Country: Taiwan
- Language: Mandarin

Bu bu zhui zong (English title: Chase Step by Step; Chinese: 步步追杀) is a 1974 Taiwanese film directed by Yu Min Sheong.

The film is also known as Bu bu zhui sha in Hong Kong (Mandarin title).

== Plot summary ==
Two circus performers are tasked with escorting relief in the form of gold bullion to a region hit by drought. On the way they are beset by countless bandits. The marauders, of course, are waiting for them around every corner and they are besieged at each step. Also present are elements of romantic tension and some vaguely historical political references.

== Cast ==
- Barry Chan
- Shu Lin Chang
- Chung-Lien Chou
- Ping Ge
- Feng Hsu
- Yun Lan
- Hua Li
- Kuang Yung Lin
- Ka-Niu Na
- Ming Tsan Pan
- San-di Shi
- Kuo-Liang Su
- Liang Tai
- Meng Tien
- Ching Kang Tsai
- Chao Tseng
- Fei Wang
- Kai Wang
- Kuan-Hung Wang
- Hsieh Li Wu
- Min-hsiung Wu
- Fung Yue
