= The Champion of Champions =

1972 Hong Kong film by Lee Ga

The Champion Of Champions
- Directed by: Lee Ga
- Release date: 1972
- Country: Hong Kong
- Language: Mandarin

The Champion Of Champions is a 1972 Hong Kong film.
