= Luogu =

Chinese musical instrument

Luogu (Chinese: 锣鼓; pinyin: luógǔ; literally "gongs and drums") is a Chinese percussion ensemble. It typically comprises several types of drum and several types of metal idiophone (including gongs and cymbals) and wooden idiophone (including temple blocks and Chinese claves). Luogu music is performed in China and wherever there are populations of Chinese people (including Taiwan, Singapore, and other parts of the world).

Luogu is commonly used as an accompaniment in Chinese opera including Kun opera, Beijing opera and Cantonese opera and accompaniment for lion dance. In Chinese opera, luogu provides the basic rhythmic background for songs, speech, movements, dances and martial arts. It is also played as entrance and exits of actors and transition between scenes. They help in describing the environment, depicting the characters and comments on the actions. They can be used to produce sound effects such thunder storm or waves.
