= Tien Feng =

Chinese actor and director (1928–2015)

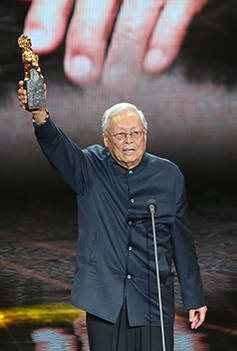
- Born: Tian Yu-kun (田毓錕); June 4, 1928; Chengchow, Honan, China
- Died: October 22, 2015 (aged 87); Hong Kong
- Occupations: Actor, director
- Years active: 1949-2004

Chinese name
- Traditional Chinese: 田豐
- Simplified Chinese: 田丰
Transcriptions
Standard Mandarin
- Hanyu Pinyin: Tián Fēng

Tien Feng (born Tien Yu-kun, 4 June 1928 – 22 October 2015) was a Chinese actor, who appeared in hundreds of films in Taiwan and Hong Kong.

He has acted with Bruce Lee in Fist of Fury (1972) and with Jackie Chan in Little Tiger of Canton (1971) The Young Master (1980), Dragon Lord (1982) and Miracles (1989).

Tien received a lifetime achievement award at the 51st Golden Horse Awards in 2014.

== Filmography ==
=== Film ===
As actor

Year	Title	Role	Notes	Ref.
1950	Happenings in Ali Shan (阿里山風雲)	Chu Hsien		
1952	A World of Springs (春滿人間)			
1953	The Spring Harvest (嘉禾生春)			
1953	War and Beauty (烽火麗人)			
1953	The Island's Artery (寶島大動脈)			
1956	A Place Without Women (沒有女人的地方)			
1958	Bloody War (血戰)			
1959	The Whore and the Holy One (蕩婦與聖女)	Kien Tcheng-hoa		
1960	Time is Running Short (喋血販馬場)			
1960	Shark of the Pacific (大平洋之鯊)	Rascal		
1960	Conscience and Crime (良心與罪惡)			
1960	Love Dreams (情天夢回)			
1960	Die xie fan ma chang			
1961	Maid of the Jungle (猿女孟麗絲)			
1961	Song Without Words (無語問蒼天)			
1961	Till the End of Time (紅顏青燈未了情)	Ho Chung-Ching		
1961	Hong yan qing deng wei liao qing			
1962	Bride-Napping (花田錯)	Li Zhong	opera film	
1962	Mid-Nightmare (夜半歌聲)		2-part film	
1962	The Hot Port of Hong Kong			
1962	The Dream of the Red Chamber (紅樓夢)	Manor Guest	cameo, opera film	
1962	14,000 Witnesses (一萬四千個證人)			
1962	The Magnificent Concubine (楊貴妃)	Captain 3	cameo	
1963	Revenge of a Swordswoman (原野奇俠傳)	Xie Tianhua		
1963	Second Spring			
1963	Return of the Phoenix (鳳還巢)	Marshall Hong	opera film	
1963	To Catch a Murderer (追兇記)			
1963	My Lucky Star (福星高照)			
1963	The Horrible Night (夜半驚魂)			
1963	The Adulteress (楊乃武與小白菜)			
1963	The Lady and the Thief			
1964	Between Tears and Smiles (故都春夢)	Adjutant Ding		
1964	Bus Girl (巴士小姐)			
1964	The Last Woman of Shang (妲己)	Su Hu		
1964	Yu tang chun	Senior Official Liu		
1964	Xue shou yin	Pao Hsing		
1964	The Warlord and the Actress (血濺牡丹紅)	Adjutant Ding		
1964	Wan gu liu fang	Juyi		
1964	The Story of Sue San (玉堂春)	Liu Pingyi	opera film	
1964	The Crimson Palm (血手印)	Bao Xing	opera film	
1965	The Butterfly Chalice (蝴蝶盃)	Fisherman Hu	opera film	
1965	Sons of Good Earth (大地兒女)	Tien Te-kuei		
1965	The Grand Substitution (萬古流芳)	Zu Ni		
1965	Pink Tears (痴情淚)	Fan Shih Ren		
1965	The Lotus Lamp (寶蓮燈)	Erlang Shen	opera film	
1965	Hong ling lei			
1965	Hong Kong, Manila, Singapore (心花朵朵開)	Shirley's eldest brother		
1965	Temple of the Red Lotus (江湖奇俠)	Dragon Jin		
1965	Inside the Forbidden City (宋宮秘史)	Chancellor Wang	opera film	
1965	The Twin Swords (鴛鴦劍俠)	Dragon Jin		
1965	The Lark (小雲雀)	Publisher		
1965	Vermillion Door (紅伶淚)	Uncle Shang		
1966	The Blue and the Black (藍與黑)	Adjutant Tsao	2-part film	
1966	The Magnificent Trio (邊城三俠)	Kao Pao Hsi		
1967	That Man in Chang-an (幪面大俠)	Liu Heng		
1967	Madame Slender Plum (慾海情魔)	Police Investigator		
1967	The Trail of the Broken Blade (斷腸劍)			
1967	The Black Falcon (黑鷹)	Wu Zhangfeng		
1967	Hong Kong Nocturne (香江花月夜)	Yen Fang		
1967	Operation Lipstick (網嬌娃)			
1967	Four Sisters (黛綠年華)	Uncle Ma		
1967	The Thundering Sword (神劍震江湖)	Du-bi Tao-chang		
1967	The One-Armed Swordsman (獨臂刀)	Chi Ju Feng		
1967	Xiang jiang hua yue ye	Yen Fang		
1967	Rape of the Sword (盜劍)			
1967	Blue Skies (艷陽天)			
1967	The Silent Swordsman (儒俠)	Wu Hao Jan		
1967	My Dream Boat (船)	Chao Tai-shan		
1967	The Mirror and the Lichee (新陳三五娘)	Squire Lü	opera film	
1967	The Assassin (大刺客)	Yen Chung Tzu		
1968	The Magnificent Swordsman (怪俠)	Deadly Whip Yi Shing Lei		
1968	Gun Brothers (千面大盜)	Inspector Ma Tak Li		
1968	Black Butterfly (女俠黑蝴蝶)	Gold Sword Kwan Yee		
1968	The Silver Fox (玉面飛狐)			
1968	The Sword of Swords (神刀)	Fang Shih Tsiung		
1969	Killers Five (豪俠傳)	Lao Shi (Guest star)		
1969	Return of the One-Armed Swordsman (獨臂刀王)	Ling Hsu		
1969	Twelve Deadly Coins (十二金錢鏢)	Yu Chien Ping		
1969	Raw Courage (虎膽)			
1969	Torrent of Desire (慾燄狂流)	Mr. Lin		
1970	The Winged Tiger (插翅虎)	Master Yin		
1970	Brothers Five (五虎屠龍)	Long Zhenfeng		
1970	My Son (春火)	Inspector Yang		
1970	The Secret of the Dirk (大羅劍俠)			
1971	The Golden Seal (金印仇)		also director	
1971	The Shadow Whip (影子神鞭)	Fang Chen Tian		
1971	Vengeance of a Snow Girl (冰天俠女)	Kao Yun		
1971	Long Road to Freedom (五枝紅杏)	Chen Ching Ho		
1971	Sunset (夕陽戀人)	Qinghe		
1971	The Oath of Death (萬箭穿心)	Ma Qingting		
1972	Fist of Fury (精武門)	Fan Chia Chi	aka The Chinese Connection	
1972	The Black Enforcer (黑靈官)	Kuan Yun-fei		
1972	King Boxer (天下第一拳)	Ming Dung-shen		
1972	The 14 Amazons (十四女英豪)	King of Asia Hsia / Mongolia		
1972	Long xiong hu di	Tang Ku		
1972	Stranger in Hong Kong (香港過客)	Li Szu		
1972	Hei ling guan	Kuan Yun-fei		
1972	The Ghost of Night Crow (大搏殺)			
1972	Filial Son (不共戴天)			
1972	The Brothers (大地雙英)			
1972	Crimes Are to Be Paid (五虎摧花)			
1972	The Invasion (龍兄虎弟)	Tang Ku		
1973	Little Tiger of Canton (廣東小老虎)	Jackie's foster father	aka Club Tiger From Kuang Tung	
1973	A Man Called Tiger (冷面虎)			
1973	The Flying Tiger (飛虎小霸王)			
1973	Back Alley Princess (馬路小英雄)	Teacher Chiang		
1973	Hai yuan chi hao			
1973	Devil and Angel (魔鬼天使)			
1973	Dang kou san lang			
1973	Shi po tian jian	Huang Hai-fung		
1973	The Girl Named Iron Phoenix (古靈精怪女煞星)			
1973	Gu ling jing guai nu sha xing			
1973	Da xiao tong chi			
1973	Kong zhong wu shi			
1973	Mo gui tian shi	Tin		
1973	The Fate of Lee Khan (迎春閣之風波)	Lee Khan		
1973	Diao shou guai zhao	Jackie's Foster Father		
1973	The Brothers			
1973	Death Comes in Three (蕩寇三狼)			
1973	Seaman No. 7 (海員七號)			
1973	The Awaken Punch (石破天驚)	Mr. Wong		
1973	The Imprudent Iron Phoenix			
1973	Win Them All (大小通吃)			
1974	Chuo tou zhuang yuan			
1974	Monkey Fist (猴拳寇四)	Kang		
1974	Naughty, Naughty (綽頭狀元)			
1974	Chi dan hao han			
1974	The Snake Girl Drop In (蛇魔女大鬧都市)			
1974	The Bodyguard (赤膽好漢)			
1975	A Haunted House (13號凶宅)			
1975	Jin fen shen xian shou			
1975	Shantung Man in Hong Kong (小山東到香港)			
1975	Yi men zhong lie			
1975	The Golden Triangle (金三角)	Old man		
1975	Da jiang nan bei			
1975	The Phantom Lute (鬼琵琶)			
1975	Filial Son			
1975	The Girl with the Dexterous Touch (金粉神仙手)			
1976	I Want More... (官人我要)			
1976	Springtime in Pattaya (春滿芭提雅)			
1976	Fierce Fist (水玲瓏)			
1976	Adventure of Shaolin (三豐獨闖少林)	Uncle		
1976	The Double Double Cross (大江南北)		also director	
1977	Tie quan xiao zi			
1977	Shui ling long			
1977	The Martyrs (一鬥忠烈)			
1977	The Kung Fu Kid (鐵拳小子)			
1977	Chinese Connection 2 (唐山大兄2)			
1977	The Fierce Fist			
1977	Jing wu men xu ji	Tin Man Kwai		
1977	Golden Nun (金尼姑)			
1977	Hi, Honey (嗨親愛的)			
1977	Love Rings a Bell (風鈴,風鈴)			
1978	Killers Two	Sam Chan Chung Tung		
1979	Raining in the Mountain (空山靈雨)			
1979	Legend of the Mountain (山中傳奇)	Zhang		
1979	Wu zhi zhan she li zi			
1979	The Monk's Fight (武之湛舍利子)			
1979	A Miracle of Leprosy (痲瘋女)			
1980	The Young Master (師弟出馬)	Master		
1980	The Savior (救世者)			
1980	Absolute Monarch (隻手遮天)			
1980	The Sword (名劍)	Fa Chin Shu		
1981	Xian ren			
1981	The Executor (執法者)			
1981	The Informer (線人)			
1981	Dark Lady of Kung Fu (蝶無影)			
1981	Fen ku lou			
1981	Gallant			
1981	The Coldest Winter in Peking (皇天后土)			
1981	Phantom Killer (粉骷髏)			
1982	Dragon Lord (龍少爺)	Dragon's father	aka Young Master in Love	
1982	Ninja in the Dragon's Den (龍之忍者)			
1982	Pink Thief (女賊)	Hao / Eagle Gang Boss		
1983	A Fistful of Talons (虎鷹)			
1983	The Pier (碼頭)			
1983	Esprit d'amour (陰陽錯)	Dr. Han		
1983	All the King's Men (天下第一)	Chai Rong		
1983	Dark Lady of the Butterfly			
1983	General Invincible (撢武門)			
1985	The Time to Live and the Time to Die (童年往事)			
1986	A Better Tomorrow (英雄本色)	Father Sung		
1986	Ninja Operation 4: Thunderbolt Angels (忍者太保之還魂鏢)			
1987	Young Dragons: Kung Fu Kids III (苦兒流浪記)			
1987	Barefoot Angels (赤腳天使)			
1988	The Revenge Ghost of the Tree (林投姐)			
1989	Miracles (奇蹟)	Elder Ku	aka Mr Canton and Lady Rose	
1989	Fa da mi ji	President		
1989	Triads: The Inside Story (我在黑社會的日子)	Uncle Kwan		
1989	Whampoa Blues (壯志豪情)			
1989	Sentenced to Hang (三狼奇案)	Wong Kam Shek		
1989	How to Be a Millionaire (發達秘笈)			
1989	The Return (還鄉)			
1990	No Risk, No Gain (至尊計狀元才)	Yeung Chun		
1990	Song of the Exile (客途秋恨)	Hueyin's Grandfather		
1991	Don't Fool Me (中環英雄)	Yip Chi-mei		
1991	Fantasy Romance (魔畫情)	Taoist Priest		
1991	Casino Raiders II (至尊無上II永霸天下)	Uncle Fan		
1991	God of Gamblers III: Back to Shanghai (賭俠II上海灘賭聖)	Shanghai mayor		
1991	Sex and Zen (玉蒲團之偷情寶鑑)	Master Iron Doors	Uncredited	
1992	Gun n' Rose (龍騰四海)	Lung Yat-fu		
1993	Green Snake (青蛇)	Spider		
1994	A Soul Haunted by Painting (畫魂)			
1996	Fist of Legend 2: Iron Bodyguards			
1999	Century Hero (千禧巨龍)			
2004	The Passage (經過)			
2004	Love of May (五月之戀)	Zhao Gengsheng		
2004	Eros	Master Jin	(segment "The Hand") (final film role)	

As director

- 1971: The Golden Seal (金印仇) - also actor
- 1976: The Double Double Cross (大江南北) - also actor

=== Television series ===
Year	Title	Role	Notes
1979	Dragon Strikes (天龍訣)	Ageless god	Rediffusion TV series
1980	On the Waterfront (湖海爭霸錄)	An Hoi-on	Rediffusion TV series
1983	Star Knows My Heart (星星知我心)	Liang Chen-shan	TTV series
1984	Rosy Life (玫瑰人生)	Hu Zhiwei	TTV series
1984	Last Night Stars (昨夜星辰)	Chiu Ming-yuan	CTV series
1984	Book and Sword Chronicles (書劍江山)	Zhang Zhaozhong	TTV series
1985	Love Sky in Loveless Land (無情荒地有情天)		CTS series
1986	Xin Juedai Shuangjiao (新絕代雙驕)	Jiang Biehe	TTV series
1992	Legends of Liu Po-wen (劉伯溫傳奇)		CTS series
1993	Justice Bao (包青天)	Pei Tianlan	Segment 18: "The Number One Farm Site" (天下第一莊)
1993	Justice Bao (包青天)	Shi Guozhu	Segment 24: "The Real and the Fake Lord Bao" (真假包公)
1993	Justice Bao (包青天)	Minister Sun	Segment 35: "The Fortunes of Life and Death" (陰陽判)
1993	Justice Bao (包青天)	Qin Hua	Segment 40: "The Fallen Princess" (乞丐王孫)
1993	Justice Bao (包青天)	Zhan Zhao's teacher	Segment 41: "Five Rats in the Eastern Capital" (五鼠鬧東京)
1994	The Seven Heroes and Five Gallants (七俠五義)	Prince of Xiangyang	CTS series
1997	The Strange Cases of Lord Shih (施公奇案)	Old Man Li	Segment 1: "The Flatbread Emperor and the Petty Official" (燒餅皇帝芝麻官)
1997	The Strange Cases of Lord Shih (施公奇案)	Prince Ming	Segment 8: "The Orphan's Tears" (孤雛淚)
1997	The Strange Cases of Lord Shih (施公奇案)		Segment 23: "Hunt On Behalf of Heaven" (代天巡狩)
1997	The Strange Cases of Lord Shih (施公奇案)		Segment 25: "The Magical Jade Flute" (玉簫神笛)
1997	The Strange Cases of Lord Shih (施公奇案)		Segment 26: "Grandma Tigress" (虎姑婆)
1998	The Loafer-Turned-Imperial Envoy (浪子大欽差)	Old Master An	CTV series
1998	Old House Has Joy (老房有喜)	Su San	CTV and STV series
2000	Spicy Teacher (麻辣鮮師)	General Wu	CTS series
2003	Crystal Boys (孽子)	adjutant of the Wangs	PTS series

== See also ==
- Cinema of Hong Kong
- Cinema of Taiwan
- Fist of Fury
