= The Valiant Ones =

1975 Hong Kong film by King Hu

- Theatrical poster
- 忠烈圖
- Directed by: King Hu
- Written by: King Hu
- Produced by: King Hu
- Starring: Pai Ying; Hsu Feng; Roy Chiao; Han Ying-chieh; Sammo Hung
- Cinematography: Chen Ching-Chu
- Edited by: King Hu; Siu Nam
- Music by: Wang Jun-Dong
- Production companies: King Hu Film Productions; Golden Harvest
- Distributed by: Golden Harvest
- Release dates: 25 September 1974 (Taiwan); 19 February 1975 (HK)
- Running time: 92 minutes
- Country: Hong Kong
- Language: Mandarin

The Valiant Ones (忠烈圖), or lit. 'Portrait of the Loyal Martyrs', is a 1975 Hong Kong wuxia film written, directed, and produced by King Hu. Produced and distributed by Golden Harvest, it starred Roy Chiao, Pai Ying, Hsu Feng, Han Ying-chieh and Sammo Hung, who was also the action choreographer. It portrays a 16th-century conflict between Chinese officials and the wokou mediated by a husband-and-wife duo.

== Synopsis ==
The film is set in 16th-century China during the Ming dynasty. Facing threats from the wokou along the southern coast, Chinese officials recruit a husband-and-wife duo to fight their adversaries.

== Cast ==
- Roy Chiao as Yu Dayou
- Pai Ying as Wu Jiyuan
- Hsu Feng as Wu Ruoshi
- Sammo Hung as Hakatatsu
- Han Ying-chieh as Xu Dong
- Tu Kuang-chi as Zhu Wan
- Yeung Wai as Zhou Lide
- Zhao Lei as the Emperor
- Hao Li-jen as Li
- Cheung Wing-fat as Cai Men
- Yuen Siu-tien as Gao
- Wu Chia-Hsiang as Lin
- Chiang Nan as Lin Tong
- Chow Siu-Loi as Liao Er
- Yuen Biao as Gu Tian
- Chan Wui-ngai as a pirate

== Themes ==
Jonathan Clements, in an essay composed as a supplement for a home media release, writes about the film's connections to anti-Japanese sentiment in China which was on the rise at the time the film was produced. He compares the film's general set-up to Seven Samurai and The Magnificent Seven but points out that The Valiant Ones includes historical figures, which adds a note of authenticity. He also points out the film's theatrical inspirations, including notes of Chinese opera brought to the film by Sammo Hung (who was a former Beijing opera performer and worked as an action choreographer on the film).

== Release ==
The Valiant Ones was screened at the 1975 Chicago International Film Festival, where it was nominated for Best Feature Film. The film also screened at the 1995 International Film Festival Rotterdam and the 2019 Hong Kong International Film Festival. The Harvard Film Archive organized a screening of the film as part of its 2013 film program King Hu and the Art of Wuxia in association with the Taiwan Ministry of Culture. The Valiant Ones is also periodically screened at the Berkeley Art Museum and Pacific Film Archive as part of its film exhibits.

=== Home media ===
The film was released by Eureka on Blu-ray and Ultra HD Blu-ray on May 27, 2024.

== Reception ==
Chris Berry, previously associate professor of film studies at UC Berkeley, lauded the film's "intricate web of betrayals and plots". He described that "the only nobility to be had is within the swords of the valiant ones, those doomed to protect the shores of an empire rotting from the inside". The Harvard Film Archive called The Valiant Ones King Hu's "last true wuxiafilm". They described that the film's "choreography—action is expressed in calligraphic strokes such as the brief clanging of blades, the whizzing-by of arrows and the rhythmic flight of bodies—the film is nevertheless majestic in its evocation of landscape. But unlike the preternaturally gifted heroes of most swordplay films, Hu's valiant ones are mortal".

Derek Elley writes that "The Valiant Ones... is replete with the expected ebb and flow of artifice, suspicion and sylvan sussuration — Hu [has the] masterly skill at evoking a sense of dislocated reality, the pregnant calm which signals imminent danger... Hu shows his perennial concern for the ruthlessly rigid pecking-order of power structures--expressed, as always, through skill in the martial arts".
