= A Touch of Zen =

1970 Taiwanese-Hong Kong film by King Hu

- Film poster
- 俠女
- Directed by: King Hu
- Written by: King Hu
- Based on: "Xianü" by Pu Songling
- Produced by: Hsia Wu Ling-fung
- Starring: Hsu Feng; Shih Chun; Bai Ying; Tien Peng; Roy Chiao
- Cinematography: Hua Hui-ying
- Edited by: King Hu; Wing Chin-chen
- Music by: Wu Ta-chiang; Lo Ming-tao
- Production companies: Union Film; International Film Production
- Distributed by: Union Film (Taiwan); Golden Harvest (Hong Kong)
- Release dates: 10 July 1970 (Part 1, Taiwan); 18 November 1971 (Part 2)
- Running time: 180 minutes
- Countries: Taiwan; Hong Kong
- Language: Mandarin
- Box office: HK$678,321 (Hong Kong)

A Touch of Zen (俠女) is a two-part wuxia film written, co-edited and directed by King Hu, originally released in 1970 and 1971. The film is set in the Ming dynasty under the dominance of eunuchs and explores a variety of themes including the transcendence of dichotomies, Zen Buddhism, feminism, conservative female roles, and the ghost story.

The film was produced in Taiwan and funded by the Union Film Company. In his book on the film, Stephen Teo suggests that the film has roots in Hong Kong cinema, noting the number of both Taiwanese and Hong Kong actors and crew members. Because the director Hu was a filmmaker in the Shaw Brothers Studio before moving to Taiwan, the emergence of the film established the international visibility of the Hong Kong New Wave. At the 1975 Cannes Film Festival, the film was nominated for the Palme d'Or and won the Technical Grand Prize award, the second-ever Chinese-language film to win an award at the festival.

The original Taiwanese release was in two parts in 1970 and 1971 (filming was still ongoing when the first part was released) with the bamboo forest sequence that concludes Part 1 reprised at the beginning of Part 2; this version has a combined runtime of 200 minutes. In November 1971, both parts of the film were combined into one for the Hong Kong market with a runtime of 187 minutes.

A 4K restoration project was initiated in 2014, hosted by the male lead Shih Chun and funded by the female lead Hsu Feng. The restored version, with a total runtime of 180 minutes, was re-screened in the "Cannes Classics" section at the 2015 Cannes Film Festival.

== Synopsis ==
The film is set in 17th-century China during the Ming dynasty. In a remote mountain village, Gu Shengzhai, a well-meaning but unambitious scholar and painter, has a tendency to be clumsy and ineffectual. One day, a stranger called Ouyang Nian arrives in town and asks Gu to paint a portrait of him. Ouyang's real objective, however, is to arrest a fugitive on behalf of the spy agency Eastern Depot. The fugitive, Yang Huizhen, is Gu's friend and together they plot against the evil eunuch Wei Zhongxian, who wants to exterminate Yang's family after her father Yang Lian attempted to warn the emperor of Wei's corrupt ways.

Yang has fled under the protection of Shi Wenqiao and Lu Ding'an, who are loyal to her father. The saintly and powerful Chan Buddhist monk Huiyuan intervenes to protect them, and they spend two years at his monastery where he teaches them self-defence. Ouyang, Yang and her friends are all superior martial artists. Ouyang has a special flexible sword that bends and that he can wear within his belt, making him seem unarmed.

Gu and Yang become lovers. As Gu becomes drawn into Yang's conflict with the Eastern Depot, he gradually develops from a passive scholar into an active participant in the resistance, and he even comes up with a fiendish "Ghost Trap" for the Eastern Depot agents. Ouyang is killed in a fight in a bamboo forest, and they use his signature seal to lure the Eastern Depot agents into the trap. This is a plan to use a supposedly haunted site to play tricks on the guards to make them believe they are prey to the undead. Lu dies in the "Ghost Trap" battle. In the aftermath, Gu walks through the carnage, laughing at the ingenuity of his plan until the true cost of human life dawns upon him. He sees Huiyuan and his followers arrive to help bury the dead.

After the battle, Gu is unable to find Yang, who has apparently left him and does not want him to follow her. He tracks her down at the monastery, where she has given birth to a child and become a nun. She tells Gu that they are not fated to be together, and entrusts their child to his care. Later, when Gu and the child are tracked down by Wei Zhongxian's deputy Xu Xianchun, Yang and Shi come to Gu's rescue. Huiyuan and four of his fellow monks also arrive to fight Xu. After Xu fakes repentance in order to surprise attack Huiyuan, a battle begins in which Xu is killed and Yang, Shi and Huiyuan are all badly injured.

The film ends with the injured Yang staggering toward a silhouetted figure, presumably Huiyuan, seen meditating with the setting sun forming a halo around his head.

== Cast ==
- Hsu Feng as Yang Huizhen, the protagonist, a female knight-errant
- Shih Chun as Gu Shengzhai, a scholar and painter who later becomes involved in the jianghu.
- Roy Chiao as Huiyuan, a Chan Buddhist monk
- Bai Ying as Shi Wenqiao, who, disguised as a blind man, assists Yang to escape.
- Xue Han as Lu Ding-an, who, disguised as a physician, protects Yang.
- Tien Peng as Ouyang Nian, the major antagonist, who works for the Eastern Depot, tasked with capturing Yang Huizhen.
- Cao Jian as Xu Zhengqing, the local magistrate
- Zhang Bingyu as Gu Shengzhai's mother
- Wang Rui as Men Da
- Miao Tien as Nie Qiu, one of Men Da's advisors
- Han Ying-chieh as Xu Xianchun, who continues the pursuit of Yang Huizhen after Ouyang's death
- Wan Zhong-shan as Lu Qiang
- Jia Lushi as Yang Lian, Yang Huizhen's father
- Cheung Wen-men as Tao Long
- Liu Chu and Gao Ming as the magistrate's men

Notable stunt actors who appeared in the film included Sammo Hung, Jackie Chan, Lam Ching-ying and Chan Wui-ngai.

== Production ==
=== Adaptation ===
King Hu was heavily inspired by the original story of "Xia Nü" (The Heroic Maid), a short story from Liaozhai Zhiyi (Strange Tales from a Chinese Studio). The original story's title also serves as the film's Chinese name. The original story tells of a poor but talented scholar named Gu who lived in Jinling. However, the anthology was written by Pu Songling, a poor and unaccomplished scholar, and his literature frequently depicted his bitterness due to failing imperial examinations. The screenplay took King Hu six months to write. He arranged the credit of Liaozhai Zhiyi as the first title card right after the company logo in the film, even before the film title. In Pu's original story, the male scholar does not pursue being a knight-errant and the separation between wen and wu. However, the film modifies the character's attributes and instead leads the scholar to adapt knight-errantry and restore the country from the corrupted dominance of the eunuchs.

Cultural Influence

According to Ping-kwan Leung, King Hu’s films were shaped by a variety of traditional Chinese cultural influences, including classical literature, history, opera, Confucianism, and Buddhism. Influenced by Hu’s interest in Ming history, A Touch of Zen is set during the Ming dynasty and incorporates the politics of the Eastern Depot. The scholar-painter, Gu Shengzhai embodies the ideals of traditional Chinese literati culture and the image of a Confucian scholar detached from fame and success. The influence of classical literature is also evident. Besides adapting Liaozhai Zhiyi, A Touch of Zen references Li Bai’s famous poem Drinking Alone in the Moonlight. Hu further incorporated elements of traditional Chinese opera into the film’s music, performance styles, and action choreography. Through the integration of these cultural elements, A Touch of Zen combines traditional Chinese aesthetics with cinematic expression, contributing to Hu’s distinctive cinematic style.

=== Filming ===
A Touch of Zen was shot in Taiwan and was funded by Taiwanese production company Union Film Company. Principal photography took just over three years, due to Hu's perfectionist approach.

The bamboo forest sword fight has been discussed as an example of Hu's use of cinematic space and editing. Rather than presenting combat as a continuous realistic event, the scene uses rapid cutting, shifting viewpoints, and fragmented movement to create a stylized sense of speed and weightlessness. Rodríguez argues that Hu's action scenes use elliptical cuts, diegetic insert shots, and visual fragmentation to make bodies appear to move through space in extraordinary ways.

King Hu wanted the film to have entirely authentic sets, props, and costumes, so he could achieve the supernatural theme. He played a large role in set design because the set designers did not completely understand his vision. In addition to this challenge, many scenes were shot out of sequence because the season in the script did not align with the current season when filming. Hu also did not have enough funding to thoroughly execute his vision and was forced by the publishing house to split A Touch of Zen into two parts after incurring high filming costs.

=== Cinematography and editing ===
Rodríguez describes Hu’s film style as a form of spatial construction rather than simple action recording. In A Touch of Zen, editing breaks martial movement into multiple viewpoints through elliptical cutting, insert shots, and changes in camera position. This visual fragmentation makes the action appear faster and less physically ordinary, while also creating a deliberately unstable sense of cinematic space.

=== Music and sound design ===
The film's soundscape, crafted by Wu Da‑jiang (吳大江) and Lo Ming‑tao (羅明道), integrates traditional Beijing–opera percussion ("luogu") with ambient silence, enhancing the spiritual mood and dramatic tension. In his essay, Brian Eggert emphasizes that "percussive rhythms give dancelike physicality to swordfights, while deep reverberating strings accompany the Zen monk characters," creating a musical structure that parallels Hu's cinematic editing rhythms. Eggert notes this alignment of sound and movement reflects Hu's ambition to "utilize film language" by treating combat as visual music.

== Themes ==
=== Transcendence of dichotomies ===
One major theme of A Touch of Zen is the relationship between wen, or civil-literary culture, and wu, or martial action. Gu Shengzhai begins as a scholar and painter, but his involvement with Yang Huizhen draws him into strategy, violence, and political conflict. Teo argues that Hu's stylized violence is not only spectacle; it also questions the legitimacy of power and authority.

=== Zen Buddhism ===
The theme of Buddhism is in opposition to Confucianism and offers the ideas of transcendence and redemption. James Steinstrage considers that the unambitious scholar Gu's involvement in Jianghu and the unexplained motivation of Yang Huizhen's sexual intercourse with Gu lead to absurdity and vacuity, which matches the concept of emptiness in Zen Buddhism. Paradoxically, the Zen ideologies are not profound in the film and the translated film title A Touch of Zen can be a marketing strategy to attract Western audiences and recall exoticism.

On the other hand, film commentator Tony Rayns, in his commentary in Criterion Collection's home video release, considers the second half of the film involving Zen monks the origin of the title. In Rayns' final analysis, "A Touch of Zen is a sentient art object that comes from the singular mind of King Hu. As an audience, we appreciate the film because we engage with it as an object rather than emptying our minds of the object for Zen contemplation or meditation. A Touch of Zen is a masterful work and as such, it is unforgettable. Indeed, if Zen is to be understood as an experience that is both conscious and unconscious, the enigma inherent in A Touch of Zen can only be resolved by exposing oneself to the film more than once, followed perhaps by increased meditation. Such is the artistic irony of the work that, when we come out of the cinema (our return to the conscious world, so to speak), its final images of abstract conceits of truth and existence, reality and illusion, mind and matter, remain etched in the mind — and at the moment that we watched these images, they gave us the possibility of a Zen transcendental experience through cinema."

Hu himself was not Buddhist, writing in screening notes for the film "I don’t have the least intention of being didactic or evangelical in my approach to this matter. All I am interested in is presenting the flavor of a particular experience."

=== Feminism and conservative womanhood ===
The film presents Xia Nü Yang in the paradoxical image of female roles. She delivers a son to continue Gu's family line as a traditional mother and help fulfill Gu's filial piety, revealing the dominance of patriarchy in society. From a feminist perspective, she also has the initiative to end her relationship with Gu and reject the feudalistic values of women's obligation to men. This concept of feminism involves a split, between biological and psychic drives on the one hand and the law of the patriarchy on the other. Though Yang's actions are dependent on the law and invariably submit to it, her actions are also a sign of her discipline and courage in the execution of her feminist ideals.

=== The ghost story ===
King Hu's interests in a Chinese genre shengguai (which means gods and spirits), the haunted house as the setting, and death traps (jiguang) suggest Gu's allies are supernatural ghosts. The film adopts the motifs of "Liaozhai gothic", including the goldenrod alarm system that alerts the unexpected visitors in the haunted house.

== Reception ==
=== Box office ===
A Touch of Zen failed at the box-office when it was released in two parts in Taiwan in 1970 and 1971. The film only ran one week in the cinema and failed because of its themes of ambiguous sexuality and feminist sensibility. In 1971, the film again failed to receive recognition with its release in Hong Kong due to the overwhelming success of Bruce Lee's movie The Big Boss. The film grossed HK$678,320.9 in Hong Kong. It was not until the full three-hour version was revived for a screening at the 1975 Cannes Film Festival that A Touch of Zen gained wide attention.

=== Critical reception ===
Gina Marchetti considers that the film's wuxia genre is a new emergence in the Hong Kong New Wave and writes, "although produced in Taiwan after Hu had left Hong Kong, the international accolades for this film brought the "new" cinema of Hong Kong much greater visibility, while providing an art house alternative to the enormous international popularity of Bruce Lee."

For the Criterion Collection author David Bordwell writes, "The story is simple, but the treatment is complex. No Shaw film would have delayed the basic exposition so cunningly. And no Shaw film would have presented heroic swordplay through the eyes of a secondary character. Yet by building the plot around Gu, Hu creates a protagonist-as-witness."

Writing for the Journal of Cinema and Media Studies, Héctor Rodríguez notes, "In that film...the director's use of elliptical cuts, diegetic insert shots, and other strategies of visual fragmentation allows characters to float magically through the air across long distances, to reach impossibly high altitudes in a single superhuman leap, and to change direction miraculously in midair."

In his book, King Hu's A Touch of Zen, Stephen Teo writes that, "this final reduction of the mythical female knight-errant figure into human status is meant to provoke us into a philosophical understanding of ourselves. The subject of Buddhist transcendence is Hu's way of delivering the ultimate critique of the genre's raison d'être which is the audience's wish-fulfilment for heroes to save them from their own vulnerability."

In another journal, Teo builds upon this interpretation, arguing that the film's stylized violence is not designed for spectacle, but instead acts as a "mythical expression through which the legitimacy of power and authority is questioned". Specifically, he interprets Hui Yuan's final gesture, defeating Xu with a touch before transforming into Buddha, as "an exhortation to transcend [a] history of violence", thus offering a philosophical and spiritual critique of mortal conflict.

In recent decades, A Touch of Zen has received renewed scholarly attention from East Asia. David Bordwell has praised its synthesis of opera choreography with cinematic form, stating that "no filmmaker has been more distinctive and exhilarating than King Hu" in adapting stylized movement into film form. Furthermore, the film is discussed as a landmark in Taiwan's art‑cinema movement, embodying national identity, classical aesthetics, and political resonance within the Mandarin‑language film industry.

=== Accolades ===
The film was awarded the Technical Grand Prize and nominated for the Palme d'Or at the 1975 Cannes Film Festival. It became the second Chinese-language film to win an award at the Cannes Film Festival and the first wuxia film to win at an international film festival.

At the 24th Hong Kong Film Awards various Asian film critics, filmmakers and actors voted for the top Chinese films from Hong Kong, Taiwan and China. A Touch of Zen was listed at 9th place on the list. In 2011, the Tapei Golden Horse Film Festival had 122 industry professionals take part in the survey. The voters included film scholars, festival programmers, film directors, actors and producers to vote for the 100 Greatest Chinese-Language Films. A Touch of Zen was listed at 15th place on the list.

In 2021, The Daily Star ranked A Touch of Zen at 4th on its list of the greatest short story adaptations, writing "Influencing future classics like Crouching Tiger, Hidden Dragon and House of Flying Daggers, there is perhaps no greater film as influential and as underappreciated".

== Home media ==
A Touch of Zen was released on DVD for the North American market on 10 December 2002, by Tai Seng Entertainment, with only King Hu's biography and filmography as extras. The film was also released on PAL DVD for the British market on 28 July 2003, by Optimum Releasing (now StudioCanal UK), as well as for the German market on 10 April 2008, by KSM GmbH as part of their "King Hu Collection". The film was released on PAL DVD in France on 1 September 2004, as simply Touch of Zen by Films sans Frontières (Films Without Borders), which has both French and English subtitles.

After the film's 4K restoration in 2015, the film's first Blu-ray release was by Eureka Entertainment for the Masters of Cinema series, released on 25 January 2016, for the British market, which also includes a DVD edition of the film. Both editions include a select scene commentary by critic Tony Rayns, the film's theatrical trailer, and newly translated English subtitles, as well as a 36-page booklet which features director King Hu's statement from the 1975 Cannes Film Festival, a 1975 interview with the director by Rayns, the short story the film was based on, eight characteristics of "the swordswoman" in King Hu's films, and archival images. A limited-edition version of the Blu-ray and DVD adds a 2012 documentary about King Hu and a new essay by filmmaker David Cairns.

On 19 July 2016, American home video company The Criterion Collection released the film on Blu-ray and DVD using the same 4K restoration also used by the Masters of Cinema release. Both the Blu-ray and DVD include the 2012 documentary about King Hu, new interviews with the actors Hsu Feng and Shih Chun, filmmaker Ang Lee, and film scholar Tony Rayns, the theatrical 4K re-release trailer, and newly translated English subtitles, as well as a leaflet containing a new essay by film critic and theorist David Bordwell and King Hu's notes from the 1975 Cannes Film Festival. The new Blu-ray and DVD cover and interior poster (combined with the leaflet) was illustrated by Greg Ruth and designed by Eric Skillman.
