= Raining in the Mountain =

1979 Hong Kong-Taiwanese film by King Hu

- Film poster
- Traditional Chinese: 空山靈雨
- Simplified Chinese: 空山灵雨
- Literal meaning: empty mountain, spirit rain
- Hanyu Pinyin: kōngshān líng yǔ
- Directed by: King Hu
- Written by: King Hu
- Produced by: Chung Ling; Lo Kai-Mu
- Starring: Hsu Feng; Sun Yueh; Tung Lin; Tien Feng; Wu Chia-hsiang
- Cinematography: Henry Chan
- Edited by: King Hu
- Music by: Ng Tai Kong
- Production companies: Lo & Hu Company Productions
- Release date: 11 July 1979 (Hong Kong)
- Running time: 121 minutes
- Countries: Hong Kong; Taiwan
- Language: Mandarin

Raining in the Mountain (Chinese: 空山靈雨) is a 1979 wuxia film written and directed by King Hu. The film is a Hong Kong-Taiwanese co-production. It was selected as the Hong Kong entry for the Best Foreign Language Film at the 52nd Academy Awards, but was not accepted as a nominee.

== Synopsis ==
The story of a secluded Ming Dynasty monastery which rests on a mountain. A corrupt general and an ambitious esquire arrive there and quickly employ martial artists to help steal a sacred handwritten scroll of Tripitaka hidden in the monastery's library. Meanwhile, the abbot of the monastery looks for a successor, and he sets his sight on a man falsely accused by the corrupt general of being a thief and condemned some time ago. The man has just been released from prison and comes to the monastery to seek a peaceful life. The abbot names the former convict as his successor, and this action sets in motion a series of betrayals and murders in the struggle for the invaluable Tripitaka scroll.

== Cast ==
Cast adapted from the 2020 Masters of Cinema blu-ray.

- Hsu Feng as White Fox
- Sun Yueh as Esquire Wen
- Tung Lin as Chiu Ming
- Tien Feng as General Wang
- Wu Chia-Hsiang as Master Wu Wai
- Lu Chan as Monk Hui Wen
- Paul Chun Pui as Monk Hui Ssu
- Chen Hui-Lou as Lieutenant Chang Cheng
- Kim Chang-Gean as The Abbot
- Shih Chun as Monk Hui Tang

== Location ==
The filming of Raining in the Mountain was virtually all carried out in and around the 8th century Bulguksa Buddhist temple, a UNESCO World Heritage site in south-eastern South Korea. This was one of two films made by Hu in Korea in 1979. The other was Legend of the Mountain.

== Release ==
Raining in the Mountain was released in 1979. It was released for the first time in the UK on Blu-ray and DVD in Eureka's 'Masters of Cinema range, in February 2020.

== Reception ==
Raining in the Mountain was released in May 1979.

Retrospective reception of the film in Hong Kong is positive. At the 24th Hong Kong Film Awards various Asian film critics, film makers and actors voted for the top Chinese films from Hong Kong, Taiwan and China. Raining in the Mountain was listed at 59th place on the list. The New York Times hailed the 2020 restoration of the film "spectacular, exhilarating entertainment." Philip Kemp of Sight & Sound praised the film stating that "much of the film is breathtakingly beautiful, especially the wordless three-minute opening sequence" and that as the films "screenwriter, art director, editor as well as director, [King Hu] scored an impressive achievement."

In 2010, both contemporary and former research officers and programmers of the Hong Kong Film Archive as well as the Director of the Hong Kong International Film Festival and the dean of School of Film & Television at the Hong Kong Academy for Performing Arts submitted a list of the 100 Must-See Hong Kong Movies. Raining in the Mountain was included on the top 100 list.

== See also ==
- List of submissions to the 52nd Academy Awards for Best Foreign Language Film
- List of Hong Kong submissions for the Academy Award for Best Foreign Language Film
