= King Hu =

Chinese filmmaker (1932-1997)

- Born: Hu Jinquan; 29 April 1932; Beijing, Republic of China
- Died: 14 January 1997 (aged 64); Taipei, Taiwan
- Occupations: Film director; screenwriter; editor; actor; production designer
- Years active: 1956–93
- Spouse: Chung Ling (鍾玲)
- Awards: See below

Chinese name
- Traditional Chinese: 胡金銓
- Simplified Chinese: 胡金铨
Transcriptions
Standard Mandarin
- Hanyu Pinyin: Hú Jīnquán
Yue: Cantonese
- Jyutping: Wu4 Gam1-cyun4

King Hu Jinquan (Chinese: 胡金銓, 29 April 1932 – 14 January 1997) was a Chinese filmmaker and actor, based in Hong Kong and Taiwan. He is known for directing various wuxia films in the 1960s and 1970s, which brought Hong Kong and Taiwanese cinema to new technical and artistic heights. His films Come Drink with Me (1966), Dragon Inn (1967), and A Touch of Zen (1970–1971) inaugurated a new generation of wuxia films starting from the late 1960s.

The Harvard Film Archive described Hu as "one of the most influential and important Chinese directors in the history of cinema".

== Early life ==
Hu Jinquan (simplified Chinese: 胡金铨; traditional Chinese: 胡金銓) was born in Beijing to a well-established family originating from Handan, Hebei. His grandfather was the governor of Henan in the late Qing dynasty. His father had studied in Japan and was the owner of the local coal mine, and his mother was a concubine. His uncle was a high-ranking official in the Republican government. Several of his brothers held high positions in the Communist government.

Hu grew up in Beijing as a child, and emigrated to British Hong Kong in 1949. At first he wanted to study in the United States, but could not raise the money for tuition. He then worked for the local Voice of America in Hong Kong.

After moving to Hong Kong, Hu worked in a variety of occupations, such as advertising consultant, artistic designer and producer for a number of media companies, as well as a part-time English tutor.

== Career ==
=== Early work ===
In 1958, he joined the Shaw Brothers Studio as a set decorator, actor, scriptwriter and assistant director. He acted in the classic 1959 film The Kingdom and the Beauty. Under the influence of Taiwanese director Li Han-Hsiang, Hu embarked on a directorial career, helping him on the phenomenally successful The Love Eterne (1963).

=== Wuxia films ===
Hu's first film as a full-fledged director was Sons of the Good Earth (1965), a film set in the Second Sino-Japanese War, but he is better remembered for his next film, Come Drink with Me (1966). Come Drink with Me was his first success and remains a classic of the wuxia genre, catapulting the then 20-year-old starlet Cheng Pei-pei to fame. Blending Japanese samurai film traditions with Western editing techniques and Chinese aesthetic philosophy borrowed from Chinese music and operatics, Hu began the trend of a new school of wuxia films and his perpetual use of strong, valiant heroines.

Leaving the Shaw Brothers Studio in 1966, Hu travelled to Taiwan, where he made another wuxia movie, Dragon Inn. Dragon Inn broke box office records and became a phenomenal hit and cult classic, especially in Southeast Asia. This tense tale of highly skilled martial artists hidden in an inn was said to be the inspiration for Ang Lee's Crouching Tiger, Hidden Dragon (2000) and Zhang Yimou's House of Flying Daggers (2004). In 2003, the award-winning Malaysian-born Taiwanese auteur Tsai Ming-liang made Goodbye, Dragon Inn, a tribute to Hu, in which all the action takes place during a closing cinema's last show of Dragon Inn.

Chief among the films which exemplify Hu's blend of Chan (Zen) Buddhism and unique Chinese aesthetics is A Touch of Zen, which won the Grand Prix de la Commission Superieur Technique in 1975 Cannes Film Festival, and which many regard as his masterpiece. After releasing A Touch of Zen, Hu started his own production company and shot The Fate of Lee Khan (1973) and The Valiant Ones (1975) back to back on tight finances. The action choreography in both these films was the work of a young Sammo Hung. Other films include Raining in the Mountain and Legend of the Mountain (both dating from 1979, and shot in South Korea). Legend of the Mountain was co-produced with Wong Cheuk-hon, while Raining in the Mountain was produced through Hu's Lo & Hu Company Productions. Both were loosely based on stories from Pu Songling's Strange Stories from a Chinese Studio.

=== Later career ===
Though critically hailed, Hu's later films were less commercially successful than his first two films. After his late comedy masterpiece All the King's Men, he moved to California in the early 1980s. Late in his life, he made a brief return from semi-retirement in The Swordsman (1990) and Painted Skin (1992), but neither achieved the renown of his first two, financially successful wuxia films.

== Personal life ==
Hu loved Peking opera and was a trustee of a Peking opera institution. He promoted many young Peking opera pupils into the film industry, such as Jackie Chan and Sammo Hung.

Hu was multilingual and was known to be fluent in Mandarin, Cantonese and English, and adept in Korean and Japanese.

=== Death ===
Hu spent the last decade of his life in Los Angeles. He died in Taipei of complications from angioplasty. At the time of his death, Hu was attached to direct The Battle of Ono, a project he had spent decades working on. He is buried in Whittier, California.

== Legacy ==
In a 2013 retrospective, the Harvard Film Archive Hu's influence on the wuxia genre as "[what] Kurosawa would do with the samurai film and Minnelli with the Hollywood musical. While Kurosawa had a direct influence on Hu, the comparison with Minnelli is equally apt since both men were highly cultured aesthetes who paid special attention to the décor and art direction of their films and who reveled in the ability of mise-en-scène, movement and the spatial composition of the frame to express character and the relations between characters".

The British Film Institute wrote that "Hu is not simply the progenitor of the wuxia blockbuster: he goes beyond the escapist pleasures of the genre to take the audience on spiritual journeys that confound expectations".

Hu is considered one of the most influential figures in the history of Chinese-language cinema. Directors that have cited his influence include Tsui Hark, John Woo, Ang Lee, Wong Kar-Wai, and Tsai Ming-liang.

== Filmography ==
Year	Title	Director	Writer	Producer	Editor	Other	Notes
1960	The Enchanting Shadow					Yes	Assistant director
1963	The Love Eterne					Yes	Assistant director
1964	The Story of Su San	Yes	Yes				
1965	Sons of the Good Earth (大地兒女)	Yes	Yes				
1966	Come Drink with Me (大醉俠)	Yes	Yes				
1967	Dragon Inn (龍門客棧)	Yes	Yes			Yes	Also art director
1970	Four Moods (喜怒哀樂)	Yes	Yes				Segment: "Anger"
1971	A Touch of Zen (俠女)	Yes	Yes		Yes		
1973	The Fate of Lee Khan (迎春閣之風波)	Yes	Yes				
1975	The Valiant Ones (忠烈圖)	Yes	Yes	Yes	Yes		
1979	Legend of the Mountain (山中傳奇)	Yes	Yes	Yes	Yes		Also art director & costume designer
1979	Raining in the Mountain (空山靈雨)	Yes	Yes	Executive	Yes		Also art director
1981	The Juvenizer (終身大事)	Yes	Yes		Yes		
1981	Heaven's Blessing (天官赐福)	Yes					
1983	The Wheel of Life (大輪迴)	Yes					Segment: "Part 1"
1983	All the King's Men	Yes	Yes				
1990	Song of the Exile (客途秋恨)			Yes			
1990	The Swordsman (笑傲江湖)	Yes					Also art director
1992	Painted Skin (畫皮之陰陽法王)	Yes	Yes				

=== Partial list of acting roles ===
Year	Title	Role	Notes/Ref.
1956	Red Bloom in the Snow (雪裡紅)		
1956	Golden Phoenix (金鳳)		
1956	The Long Lane (長巷)		
1958	Humiliation for Sale		
1959	The Kingdom and the Beauty	Ta Niu	
1960	Qi ren yan fu	Long Yu-sheng	
1962	Hong lou meng	Bei Ming	
1963	Love Parade	Fu Li-fu	
1963	Empress Wu Tse-Tien	Zhao Dao-sheng	
1974	The Yin and the Yang of Mr. Go	Ito Suzuki	

== Awards and nominations ==
Institution	Year	Category	Work	Result
Cannes Film Festival	1975	Palme d'Or	A Touch of Zen	Nominated
Cannes Film Festival	1975	Technical Grand Prize	A Touch of Zen	Won
Chicago International Film Festival	1975	Gold Hugo	The Valiant Ones	Nominated
Chicago International Film Festival	1979	Gold Hugo	Raining in the Mountain	Nominated
Fantafestival	1983	Best Direction	The Wheel of Life	Won
Golden Horse Film Festival and Awards	1966	Best Screenplay	Sons of the Good Earth	Won
Golden Horse Film Festival and Awards	1968	Best Screenplay	Dragon Inn	Won
Golden Horse Film Festival and Awards	1979	Best Director	Legend of the Mountain	Won
Golden Horse Film Festival and Awards	1979	Best Art Direction	Legend of the Mountain	Won
Golden Horse Film Festival and Awards	1983	Best Art Direction	All the King's Men	Nominated
Golden Horse Film Festival and Awards	1983	Best Costume Design	All the King's Men	Won
Golden Horse Film Festival and Awards	1983	Best Narrative Feature	The Wheel of Life	Nominated
Golden Horse Film Festival and Awards	1997	Lifetime Achievement Award	—N/a	Won
