= Changde Apartment =

Residential building in Shanghai, China

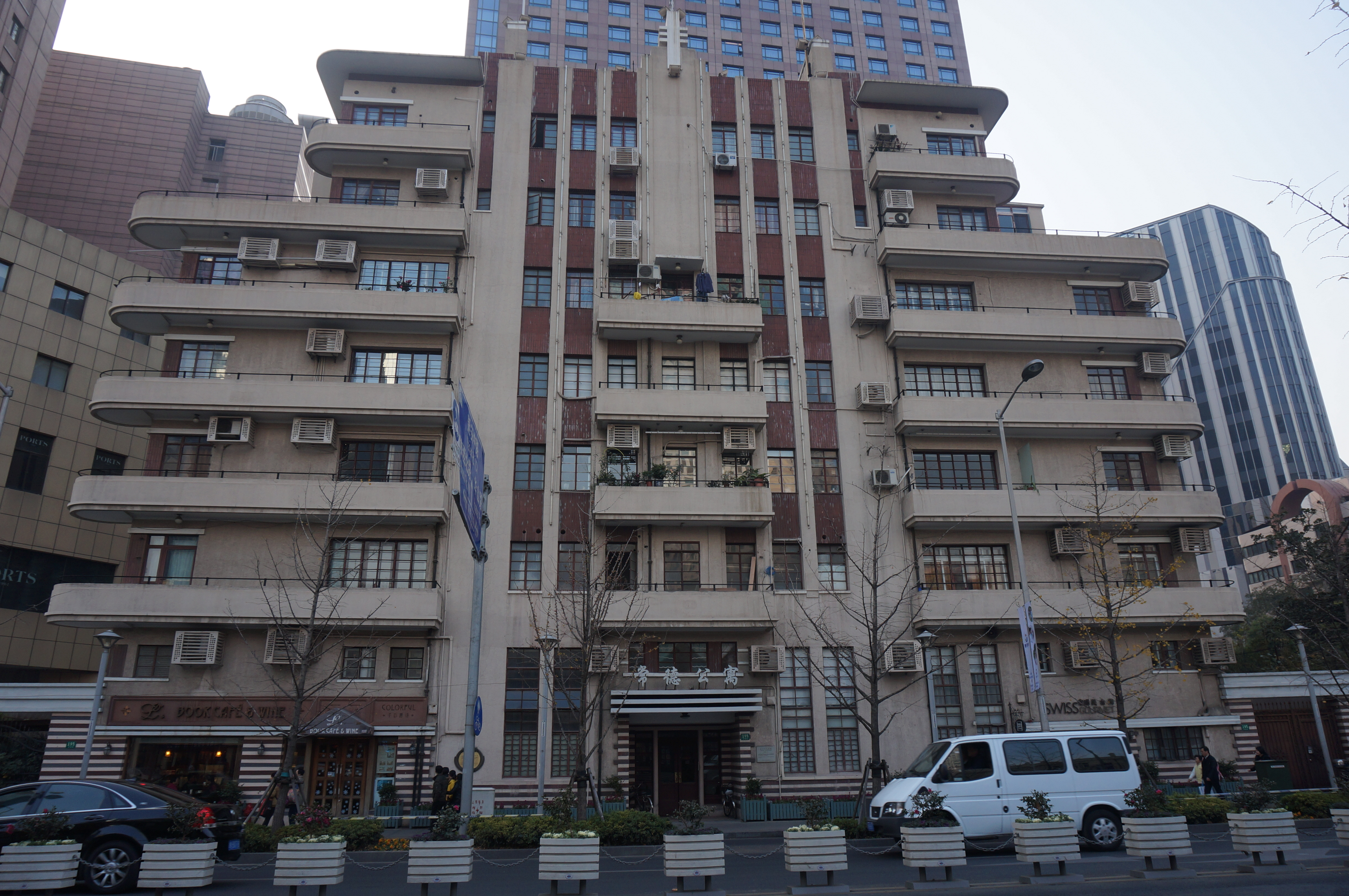
Edingburgh House

Changde Apartment (Chinese: 常德公寓), formerly known as Eddington House, is located at 195 Changde Road, Jing'an District, Shanghai, close to Nanjing West Road and Yuyuan Road. The apartment was built on Hede Road, Jing'an Temple Road in 1936. It consists of eight floors and is decorated in an Art Deco style. It was originally the property of the Italian Raoul Faith and the majority of its occupants were middle to upper class people. In 1994, Changde Apartment was designated among the second batch of outstanding historical buildings in Shanghai.

== Former residence of Eileen Chang ==
The Jing'an Temple District has been a bustling commercial and cultural centre in Shanghai for decades. In contrast with many of the high-rise buildings which surround it, Changde Apartment is a perfectly-sealed time capsule of its era.

This building's fame is due to the fact that in 1939, a 20-year-old Eileen Chang lived with her mother and aunt in Unit 51. At that time, Changde Apartment had only been built in an Art Deco style for three years. The apartment contains eight floors. The Bund can be seen from the balcony.

In 1942, Eileen Chang moved back into the apartment complex, this time in Unit 65, where she lived for the following six years. She lived and studied in Changde Apartment. She would visit the market and the cinema during her stay there and could only fall asleep to the sound of local trams clinking at night. She also got together with the elevator attendant of the apartment complex. The sixth floor was the place where Hu Lancheng attempted to visit Eileen Chang. After knocking on the door and receiving no answer, Hu stuffed a slip of paper in the narrow slit between the door and the ground, which later proved to be the starting point for an ill-fated romantic relationship.

The six years during which Eileen Chang lived here became the golden age of her literary creations. A few of her most important works including Sealed Off (《封锁》), Red Rose White Rose (《红玫瑰与白玫瑰》), The Golden Cangue (《金锁记》), and Love in a Fallen City (《倾城之恋》)made their way out from the Changde Apartment and into the public's vision. It was in Changde Apartment where Eileen Chang and Hu Lancheng met, as well as where they separated from each other. After this period, she moved out of the apartment in 1947.

Eileen Chang would observe the city from the balcony of Changde Apartment. In the prose My View on Su Qing, she wrote: 'The frontiers of Shanghai undulate slightly, shrouded in the mist of the late dusk. Although there are no hills, the frontiers create the feeling of range upon range of mountains. I think of the fate of many people; an ash grey feeling of vast and hazy fates, including my own, arouse from inside me.' In the article Notes of Delight in the Living of Changde Apartment, Eileen Chang describes her apartment life:

'I like to listen to the sound of the city. People who are more poetic than me lie on their pillows, listening to the soughing of the wind in the pines from the forest, or the roaring of the crashing waves of the sea. For me myself, I have to hear the tram ringing to fall sleep … The apartment is the most ideal place to escape. People who are tired of the metropolis often long to retreat to the tranquil and peaceful countryside. They are eager to see that one day they can return to the crop land, raise bees and grow vegetables, and enjoy the blessings of living in ease and comfort. What they don't realise though, is that in the countryside, buying half a catty of smoked bacon more than needed will cause much gossip. While at the top loft of the apartment house, there's nothing the least bit serious even if you just have to stand in front of the window and get your clothes changed.'

The writer, Chen Danyan described in the book Candyfloss Romances in Shanghai that Changde Apartment was 'painted in the light flesh tone of a woman's makeup setting powder, standing tall and upright under the blue sky in the downtown area of Shanghai.'

When Changde Apartment was still known as Eddington Apartment, there was a cafe on its lower floor. Every afternoon, Eileen Chang went to the cafe downstairs to relax. The current Changde Apartment is said to have been bought by a fan of Eileen Chang, so it cannot be entered without permission. However, the downstairs floor opened an Eileen Chang-themed bookstore, named Eddington Literary House (Qian Cai Shu Fang), which is built according to the style of the period, and this attracts crowds of Eileen Chang fans who come to make a ‘pilgrimage’ for their idol.

== Architectural features ==
Changde Apartment has been referred to as a feminine-looking building. The salmon pink wall is painted with coffee brown lines. Presumably due to its age, the building has a slight dull-grey hue, as if the rouge contaminated by the dust that was used by women of old days. Nevertheless, a row of phoenix trees in front of the building are still very lively.

Changde Apartment is designed according to the surrounding terrain, containing eight floors, with reinforced concrete structure. It covers a floor area of 580 square metres, a construction area of 2,663 square metres and is equipped with an elevator in an Art Deco style. The entire building is decorated with delicate partial ornamentations in a concave shape, and the wings turn backward. The east facade of the building features stretches of long ribbon-shaped balconies, with vertical lines in the middle forming a horizontal and vertical contrast. The top two floors are retracted towards the middle of the building, two thirds of the width of the others. The building uses the strong shadow effect formed by the balconies, curving out and the houses, caving in to form rich colour changes. In the old Changde Apartment, there were three households on each floor, with two or three bedroom units. Each home was also fitted with a fireplace. There is a long promenade to the west, which serves as a safe passage and a balcony. There is a small staircase inside each house. The eighth floor is the elevator machine room and houses a water tank.

Hu Lancheng described the living room of Unit 51, where Eileen Chang lived, as having 'a modern fresh brightness which is almost thrilling'.

Changde Apartment gained fame due to its inhabitant, Eileen Chang. After decades, this seemingly ordinary apartment still enjoys popularity. In 1992, the film Centre Stage (ruǎn líng yù 《阮玲玉》) starring Maggie Cheung (zhāng màn yù 张曼玉) was shot on the ground floor of the apartment.

It is said that the private studio of director Wong Kar-Wai (wáng jiā wèi 王家卫) is also hidden in the building. However, the apartment is now a private residence and non-residents are not permitted entry.

== Picture collection ==
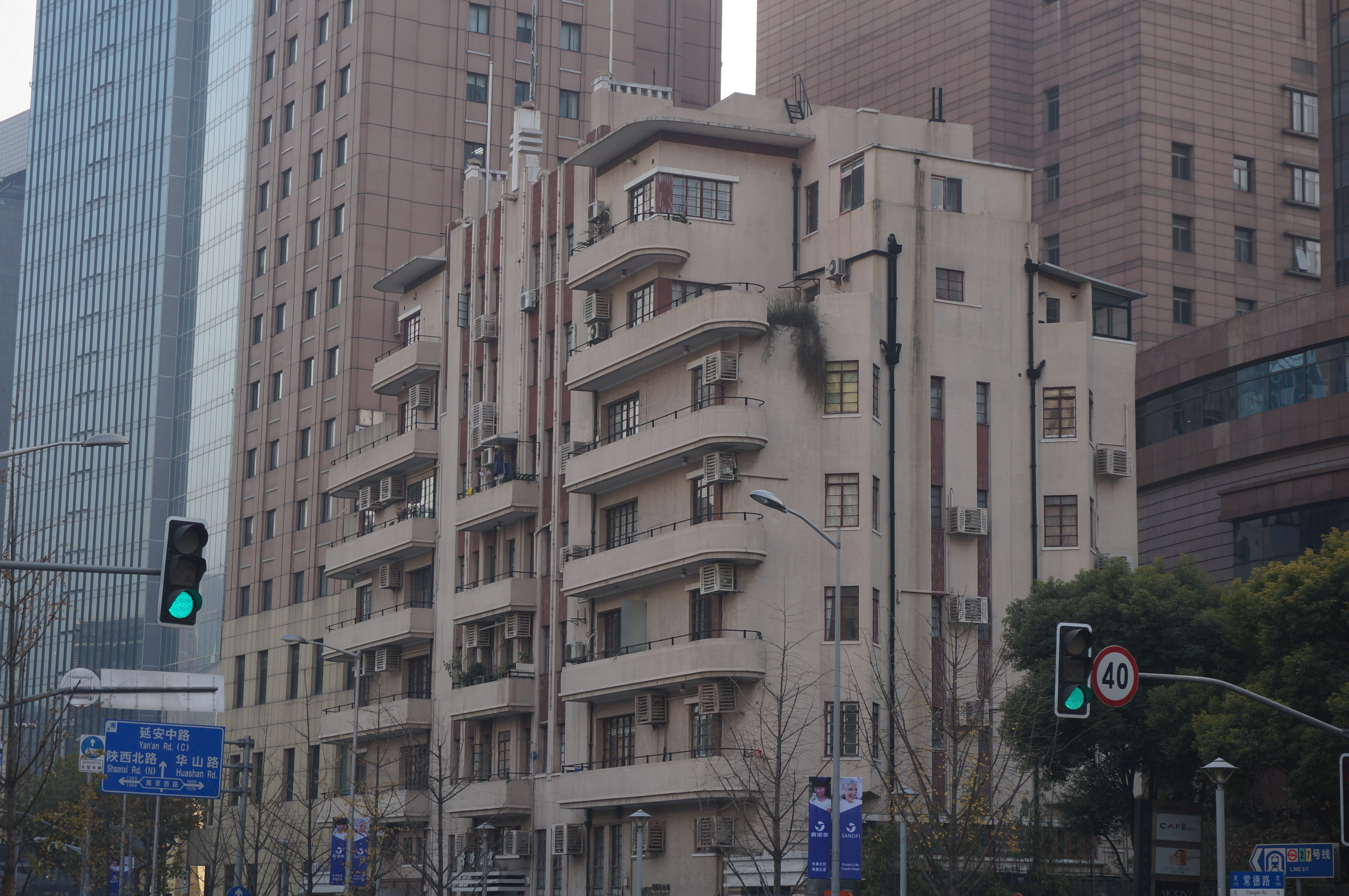
Remote view of Changde Apartment

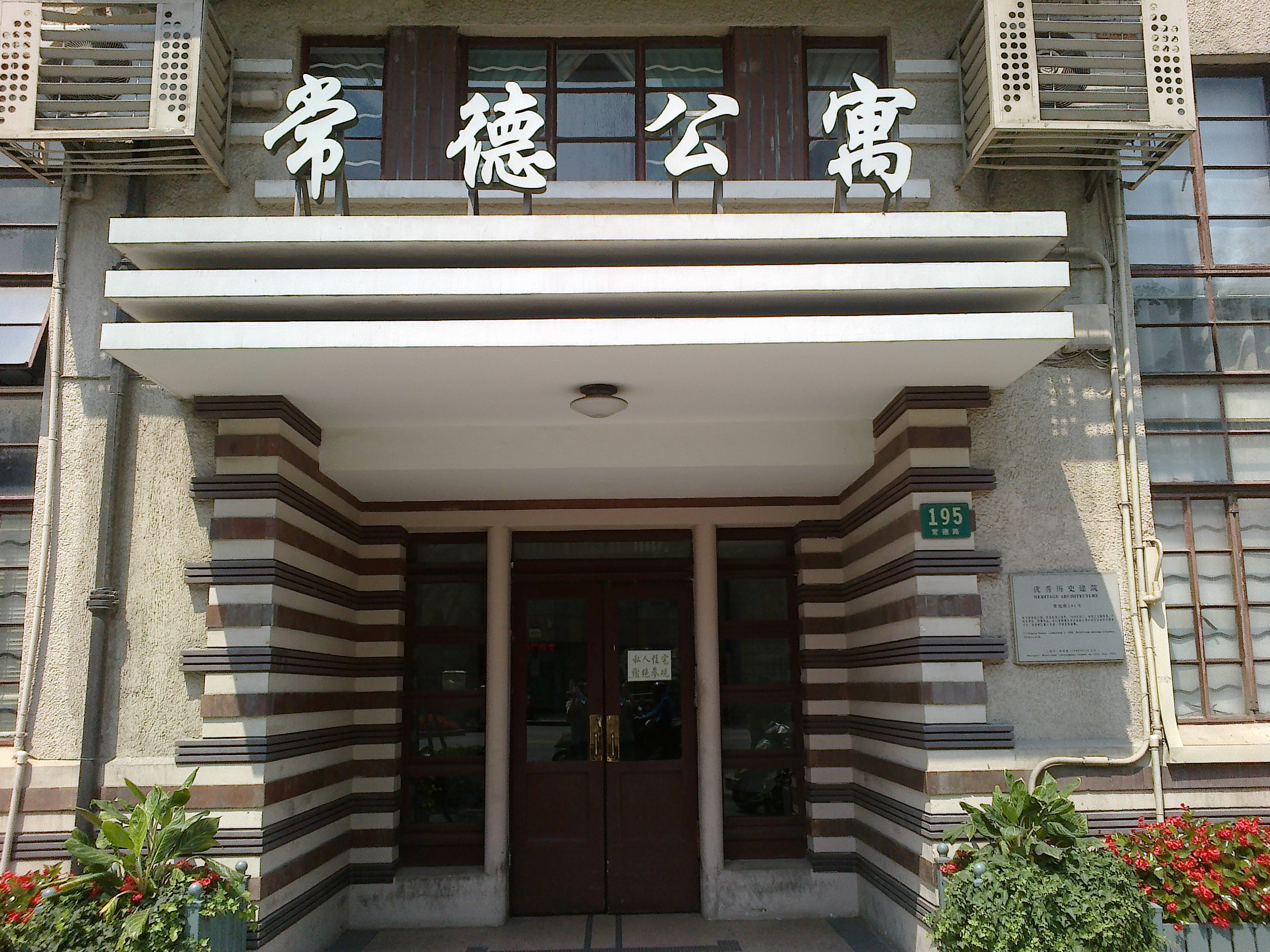
Doorway to Changde Apartment
