= The Legend of Eileen Chang =

2004 Canadian biographical TV drama

- DVD cover
- Also known as
- Traditional Chinese: 她從海上來
- Simplified Chinese: 她从海上来
- Literal meaning: She Came from the Sea
- Hanyu Pinyin: Tā Cóng Hǎi Shàng Lái
- Written by: Wang Hui-ling
- Directed by: Ting Ya-min
- Starring: Rene Liu
- Country of origin: Taiwan; China
- Original language: Mandarin
- No. of episodes: 20

Production
- Producer: Hsu Li-kong
- Production locations: Shanghai, China

Original release
- Network: Public Television Service
- Release: January 12 – February 6, 2004

The Legend of Eileen Chang is a 2004 biographical drama TV series written by Wang Hui-ling and produced by Hsu Li-kong, starring Rene Liu as Eileen Chang, one of China's greatest authors in the 20th century.

Filmed in Shanghai, China, and British Columbia, Canada, the show first aired on Taiwan's Public Television Service on January 12, 2004. In mainland China, the series was not broadcast until 2007 as a result of censorship, which forced all characters to be renamed (the lead character became "Wang Xiaowen") and the show to be completely dubbed. Government censors likely were concerned not just with Chang's well-known anti-Communist beliefs, but also with "glorification" of Chang's first husband Hu Lancheng, who served Japanese interest during the Second Sino-Japanese War and is traditionally considered a hanjian in China.

== Cast ==
- Rene Liu as Eileen Chang
- Winston Chao as Hu Lancheng
- Zhou Xiaoli as Su Qing
- Kou Zhenhai as Chang Chih-yi, Eileen Chang's father
- Ru Ping as Huang Yifan, Eileen Chang's biological mother
- Wang Lin as Sun Yongfan, Eileen Chang's stepmother
- Yan Xiaopin as Chang Mao-yuan, Eileen Chang's aunt
