= Stanley Kwan =

Hong Kong film director and producer

- Chinese: 關錦鵬
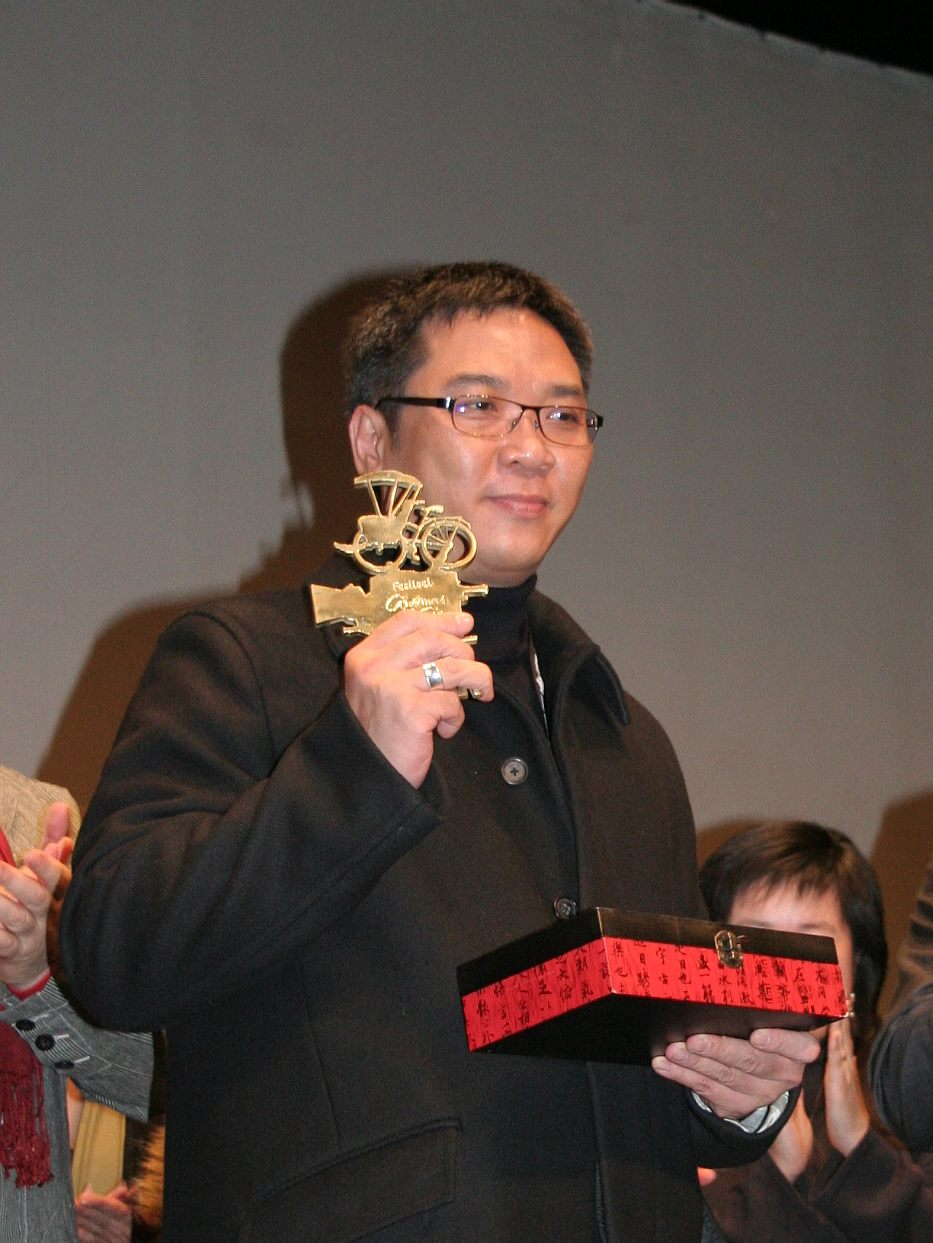
- Kwan in 2008
- Born: 9 October 1957 (age 68); Hong Kong
- Awards: Hong Kong Film Awards – Best Director; 1988 Rouge; Golden Horse Awards – Best Director; 2001 Lan Yu

Chinese name
- Traditional Chinese: 關錦鵬
- Simplified Chinese: 关锦鹏
Transcriptions
Standard Mandarin
- Hanyu Pinyin: Guān Jǐnpéng
Yue: Cantonese
- Jyutping: Gwaan1 Gam2paang4
- Hong Kong Romanisation: Kwan Kam Pang

Stanley Kwan (traditional Chinese: 關錦鵬; simplified Chinese: 关锦鹏; born 9 October 1957) is a Hong Kong film director and producer.

== Career ==
Kwan first landed a job at TVB after receiving a mass communications degree at Hong Kong Baptist College. His first film, Women (1985) which starred Chow Yun-fat, was a big box-office success.

Kwan's films often deal sympathetically with the plight of women and their struggles with romantic affairs of the heart. Rouge (1987), Full Moon in New York (1989), Center Stage (1991), a biopic on silent film star Ruan Lingyu and Everlasting Regret (2005), are all such typical Kwan films. Red Rose White Rose (1994) is an adaptation of a novella of the same name by Eileen Chang. The film was entered into the 45th Berlin International Film Festival. His 1998 film Hold You Tight won the Alfred Bauer Prize and Teddy Award at the 48th Berlin International Film Festival.

In 1996, Kwan came out as a gay man in Yang ± Yin: Gender in Chinese Cinema, his documentary looking at the history of Chinese-language film through the prism of gender roles and sexuality. He is one of the few openly gay directors in Asia and one of the very few to have worked on these themes. His Lan Yu (2001) adapts a gay love story originally published on the Internet.

Kwan is also an occasional lecturer at the City University of Hong Kong, where he teaches directing and writing to students.

In June 2025, Kwan was invited to join the Directors Branch of the Academy of Motion Picture Arts and Sciences.

== Filmography ==
=== Film ===
- Women 女人心 (1985)
- Love Unto Waste 地下情 (1986)
- Rouge 胭脂扣 (1987)
- Full Moon in New York 人在紐約 (1989)
- Too Happy for Words 兩個女人，一個靚一個唔靚 (1992)
- Center Stage 阮玲玉 (1991)
- Red Rose White Rose 紅玫瑰白玫瑰 (1994)
- Yang ± Yin: Gender in Chinese Cinema 男生女相：華語電影之性别 (1996)
- Hold You Tight 愈快樂愈墮落 (1997)
- Still Love You After All These 念你如昔 (1997)
- The Island Tales 有時跳舞 (1999)
- Lan Yu 藍宇 (2001)
- Everlasting Regret 長恨歌 (2005)
- Showtime 用心跳 (2010)
- First Night Nerves 八個女人一台戲 （2018)

== See also ==
- Hong Kong Second Wave
