= The Rice Sprout Song =

1955 novel by Eileen Chang

- First edition
- Author: Eileen Chang
- Cover artist: Jeanyee Wong
- Language: English
- Publisher: Charles Scribner's Sons
- Publication date: 1955
- Publication place: Hong Kong (China)
- Media type: Print (Hardcover & Paperback)
- Pages: 182
- LC Class: 55-7292 (1st Edition)

The Rice Sprout Song is a 1955 novel by Eileen Chang (Zhang Ailing). It was her first attempt at writing fiction in English and with it, she addresses political issues relevant to early 20th Century China in a far more direct approach than she was ever akin to. The novel depicts the extreme ruthless nature of the land redistribution movement of the Communist regime. The novel highlights the horrors and suffering it caused a southern agrarian village in early 1950s China and hinges on the lives of a large family of peasant landowners in the countryside. In doing so, the novel portrays several elements of a traditional Chinese family structure and the prominent culture of that era. The novel portrays the various and severe implications that the larger political institutions surrounding them impose, primarily the famine that led to the subsequent suffering of the peasants. It describes the desperation of ordinary farmers in the face of hunger in detail, and by analyzing the causes of hunger, highlights the contradiction between farmers' needs and government control, as well as the conflict between human nature and system. In the novel, there is also the cultural and organizational construction of the government in the countryside. Although it is also a means for the government to control the countryside, it obviously has no distinct theme of "hunger" because of its social progress.

The novel depicted the circumstances that a certain extreme communist policy had on the people in an intimate and vivid way by capturing the intricacies and rituals of family life as well as provide an accurate portrayal of the voices of countryside peasants. In doing so, Chang undoubtedly insinuates anti-communist ideologies and sparks a discourse about the dangers of communism as well as a retrospection at the harsh decisions of the communist party. The communist government was depicted to be the new landlord with proportionately more power and greed, wherein regardless of the peasant's hard work they never have enough to eat.

== Historical context ==
=== The Communist regime: land-reform ===
The story took place sometime between 1950 and 1954 in a rural town near Shanghai after the central government of the People's Republic of China enacted the Land Reform Law on June 30, 1950. The significance of the Chinese land reform consists in the elimination of the landlord-gentry class and redistribution of land among the peasantry. In the story, characters mentioned several times that they have received goods, such as the mirror in Gold Root's house, as well as land from landlords. The scene depicted in the story is a reflection of the outcome of China's land reform movement in reality at that time. During the winter of 1950-51, the land was confiscated from former landlords and redistributed to landless peasants and owners of small plots, as well as to the landlords themselves, who now had to till the land to earn a living.

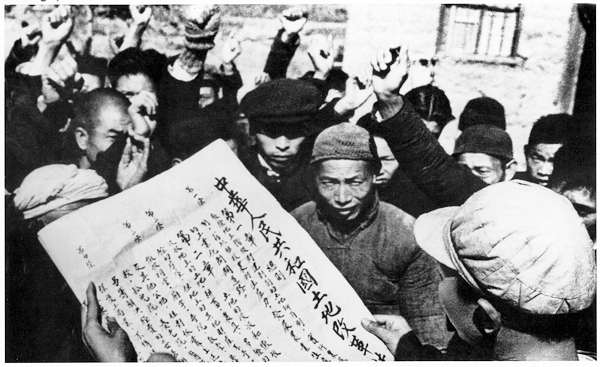
A man reads the Land Reform Law of PRC

After 1949, farmers classified as "poor peasants" by the Communists were given ownership to land taken away from local landlords and rich farmers. Estates and large farms were divided and peasants got small parcels of land. The seizure of land was not always easy. In some cases “certain necessary steps” had to be taken and this resulted in the deaths of hundreds of thousands, maybe millions, of people. In many cases, villagers were executed or beaten to death by fellow villagers to get their land. By the spring of 1953, land reform was basically complete, and the peasants had achieved genuine liberation. The feudal system of land ownership that had existed for more than 2,000 years was completely destroyed and the landlord class was eliminated. However, Shortly after the fields had been turned over to the tiller, preparations began to familiarize the peasantry with the next step in agricultural reform. Before long, the land that had been handed out to the peasants was slowly returned to the state. In the early 1950s, the Communists helped form mutual aid teams, the precursors to cooperatives. Later in 1955, Mao decreed that all farmers should "voluntarily" organize into large cooperatives. The cooperatives were overseen by party cadres and large portions of the output were turned over to the state.

=== Policy for Unified Purchase and Sale of Grain ===
The promulgation of the Policy for Unified Purchase and Sale of Grain was closely related to the grain crisis in 1953 and the implementation of the general line for the transitional period. Although the strictly monitored relationship of supply and demand for grain in China was alleviated, the grain remained unfairly and unequally distributed. In order to meet the demand for grain in large scale industrialization and to stabilize grain price, the central government had to adopt a new measure to control the resources for production. The grain crisis in 1953 offered an important opportunity to propagate the Policy for Unified Purchase and Sale of Grain.

On November 19, 1953, the Government Council had approved The Order of the Central People's Government Council on the implementation of planned acquisitions and planned supply of food. Inside the order, peasants were ordered to sell the surplus grain to the country by the National regulations' set price, set types of grain and the set amount of planned acquisitions. After peasants were to sell their grain, the surplus would then be freely stored and used. The grain can be continually sold by the peasants to the National food department or through cooperative trading at food markets which are set and regulated by the government.

In the novel, due to circumstances such as bad weather, villagers did not have a good harvest, however, the planned acquisitions by the government remained mandatory, and were nonetheless ordered to sell their grain to the government, which they could not afford to sell as they were in the bouts of famine and starvation eventually leading the male protagonist to instigate a riot.

== Chang's literary career ==
The author herself maintained a period of great popularity for about 2 years while Shanghai was under Japanese occupation in the 1940s and published the majority of her writings there. Her popularity arose soon after the publication of her first collection of short stories titled, Romances (Chuanqi, 傳奇). Chang's rise to prominence can be partly explained by the exodus of "progressive" writers from the foreign concessions to the north, which led to a vacuum in the literary scene that was filled by the leisurely Mandarin Ducks and Butterflies School of popular romance. She went to the United States in the 1950s and that was the time when The Rice-Sprout Song was published. Her fame peaked again for several years at the end of her life.

== Chang's writing process ==
=== Political aspects to Chang's writing ===
Her most productive period ended with the war, from the mid-forties to the mid-fifties, she basically remained silent. She was either neglected as a non-progressive writer lacking revolutionary zeal, or treated as controversial for publishing under the Japanese regime Her notoriety came to an end when the Chinese communist party established a new regime in 1949 and the subsequent institutionalization of the spectrum of culture in China. Chang was either neglected as a non-progressive writer lacking revolutionary zeal or treated as controversial for publishing under the Japanese regime. During the period of Japanese occupation, after the communist liberation in 1949, Chang first decided to stay in Shanghai but due to the political circumstances was forced to leave for Hong Kong where she stayed for two years between 1952-1955. During that period, she wrote the two novels Naked Earth and The Rice-Sprout Song, in English, both of which were sponsored by the United States Information Service, and which she then later rewrote in Chinese. Both the novels featured anti-Communist themes, particularly pertaining to the destructive effects of the land-reforms in Communist China. Even though both the novels did feature anti-Communist themes, particularly pertaining to the destructive effects of the land-reforms in Communist China, The Rice-Sprout Song was not considered as an anti-Communist novel by nationalists, because it also glorified communistic songs and characters throughout the storytelling unlike other anti-Communist novels. As Gu Yuanqing mentioned in the “Historical Studies of Modern Literature” 《新文学史料》, Eileen Chang was an anti-Communist Taiwanese writer, therefore, The Rice-Sprout Song could be considered as a complicated literary work, in which Chang took the stand of liberalism to depicted the idea of hate, blame, and somehow advocacy to the Communism but without the hatred of the Communism. However, Chang's motivations for writing these books themselves may have been as a result of her loss of popularity and may have been for financial reasons. When Chang wrote The Rice-Sprout Song in the mid-fifties, she had neither the intention nor the resources to predict the forthcoming horrors, but in an uncanny way, her novel foretold the cruel absurdities that Chinese would experience.

Her marriage to Hu Lancheng, a writer and intellectual who collaborated with the Chinese puppet government headed by Wang Jingwei during the war-damaged her career. The label of collaborator placed on Hu by the KMT (Kuomintang) government after the war made Zhang guilty by association, a fact that still affects her reception in China today. (Shen 114)

In the preface, Eileen Chang notes an incident published in the People's Literature, a Communist publication which motivated her novel. It involved a writer recounting the events in northern China during the spring famine of 1950. The peasants, desperate for food, stormed the granary, but the Party members defended it by opening fire, killing and wounding the villagers. Feeling disillusioned by the failure of the Party, the writer published the story, which caused him much criticism, and under pressure, he severely criticized himself for doubting the Party.

=== Anti-Communist propaganda ===
In the current study of Eileen Chang, most of the scholars believe both The Rice Sprout Song and Naked Earth are commissioned writing by United States Information Service. However, according to an interview with Roland Soong who inherited Chang's literature estate, he said it was misunderstood. In the interview, he mentioned Eileen Chang only admitted Naked Earth is commissioned in the Shuijing's interview "Night Visit Eileen Chang" 《夜访张爱玲》, but later in Wenbiao Tang's "Eileen Chang's Miscellaneous" 《张爱玲杂碎》he claimed both The Rice Sprout Song and Naked Earth are commissioned. Those who have read and reflected on his book believed that The Rice Sprout Song was also commissioned. After Stephen Soong (Soong, Qi 宋淇) read Tang's book, he wrote an article to criticized Tang's writing: "One book became two books, The Rice Sprout Song surprisingly became Tang's burial." Later Chang saw Stephen Soong's article then wrote him a letter said "she just roughly skimmed through the book and saw the word 'commission' even though I am not ostrich policy and I am not afraid of others' anger, but when I read it carefully, I could not write an article such as Stephen's article." The writing is really good. This is necessary for me". Here shows Eileen Chang also denied this work is a commissioned work. In addition, in the interview with Richard M. McCarthy, former head of United States Information Service in Hong Kong, also denied this novel was commissioned.

== Chang's depiction of the Chinese countryside ==
Some people are questioning whether Eileen Chang had actually been to the countryside before she wrote The Rice Sprout Song. If the answer is negative, then all her depictions of the countryside are imaginary and of no realistic basis. Two approaches could be used to answer this question. Before she fled to the United States, she joined a land reform team and helped implement rural revolution for two months, and such experience later inspired and informed her on this novel. Also, it is necessary for the readers to examine closely at one of her other published work, Foreign Land (《异乡记》), which is essentially a scattered collection of her travel proses. This over 30000 words piece of work was about the actual things she saw and heard over her journey from Shanghai to Wenzhou passing through Huanan countryside to meet Hu Lancheng. A lot of the countryside depictions in The Rice Sprout Song appeared first in her Foreign Land (《异乡记》), which was published only after Eileen Chang's death. In a way, Foreign Land (《异乡记》) could be seen as the prototype of The Rice Sprout Song. There are plenty of examples for this assumption, to list just a few: the latrine, shop, and short stone wall depictions in Chapter 1 of The Rice Sprout Song could be traced in Chapter 4 of Foreign Land (《异乡记》); What Gold Root T'an (Jingen) saw from his walk over the field path in Chapter 2 of The Rice Sprout Song could be traced in Chapter 1 of Foreign Land (《异乡记》) where there's similar scenery depiction through looking out the train window. The pig slaughtering scene in Chapter 12 of The Rice Sprout Song could again be traced in Chapter 6 of Foreign Land (《异乡记》).

It is still debatable if Chang has a deep understanding about the rural society or the minds of peasants, even with the experience from the trip she took to the countryside of Jiangsu Province.

The key plot of The Rice Sprout Song that triggers resistance is half of the pig and 20 kg of rice cake taken from every family to support the local army family. But the truth is all financial and food support was funded by the government during land reform, not from the other residence.

Also, in Chang’s afterword to Rice-sprout Song, she admitted that her novel was based on a writer’s self-criticism published in People’s Literature during the Three-Antis Campaign and on a story, told by a girl she knew who had worked in the countryside near Nanchang, about how the girl and the peasants lived on thin rice soup mixed with inch-long blades of grass.

== Title ==
Rice Sprout Song is a form of Chinese folk dance expressing the happiness of Chinese village people. However, The Rice-Sprout Song is ironically tragic and technically excellent. The novel depicts the total opposite of the hope that its title suggests: in fact, the title is the starting point, as well as the miniature of the novel's entire irony.

== Synopsis ==
The Rice Sprout Song depicts the absurd nature of the land reform movement of the Communist regime, as well as highlight the horrors and suffering it caused a southern agrarian village in early 1950s China. The communist revolution, followed by the land reforms, was meant to "liberate" the peasants of the village, but contrary to their hopes, the lives of the peasants did not change in the manner they expected. The characters of Chang's story face the perils of famine but also the suffering and frustration that ensues from the gradual deterioration of their civility, humanity and most of all their traditional family values. That is catalyzed by their hunger and the constant presence of the political forces, and the pressures involved with appeasing them. “In the novel, when the peasants in the village can no longer put up with pressure from local leaders to produce grain, they riot. The local people's militia intervenes, massacring them and further tightening their control in the village. At the end of the novel, the survivors are forced to parade and take part in New Year's celebrations.”

The story focuses on the life of a middle-aged couple, the T'ans, who have a young daughter named Beckon. Both male protagonist Gold Root and female protagonist Moon scent's have each other's best interest as their first priority, they constantly sacrifice themselves for the welfare of their family, yet Moon Scent has the stronger resolve in making harsh decisions of denying their other relatives to ensure the durability of the food rations. The issue of the famine and the pressures that it subjects them to, forces them to make hard decisions that challenge their deeply intimate relationship, drawing a painful wedge between them progressively over the course of the novel, as the circumstances of the famine grew dire, also rupturing their relationship with their extended family; Big Aunt, Big Uncle, and Sister-in-Law Gold Have Got.

Gold Root's (Jingen) innate selflessness and love for his family, particularly towards his wife and sister forces his more pragmatic and strong-willed wife, Moon Scent (Yuexiang) to oppose him on several occasions when it comes to the rationing of the rice (food) and providing his sister and family with donations of food. His earnest nature becomes corrupted and undone as he watches what he valued most about his family become sullied by the inhumane circumstances of the war, which ultimately drives his downfall, as he discards his rationality and blatantly rebels disregarding the inevitable dire consequences. He voices his defiance against the systems of power as personified by the ever-present and looming Comrade Wong. This outspoken nature of Gold Root eventually leads to his demise at the climax of the novel. Moon Scent is unable to prevent her husband's final rebellious act and is taken to the village barn by the local soldiers, and witnesses Gold Root being shot by the cadres and injured for instigating a riot, she also watches as her daughter Beckon is trampled amidst the chaos. She becomes a fugitive as she decides to runaway with her injured and dying husband, she goes to her relatives for help but is turned away and soon realizes all hope is lost. At the very end of the novel, it is insinuated that Moon Scent sets fire to the storehouse barn as a final act of vengeance, and is later found by Big Aunt to have been burned with it.

== Comment ==
Hu Shih, a famous Chinese diplomat and literary scholar, wrote a letter to Eileen Chang to comment on The Rice-Sprout Song, “I read your "Yangko" carefully twice, and I am very happy to see this work of great literary value. What you said is "a little bit close to the flat and natural state". I think you have achieved great success in this regard! This novel, from the beginning to the end, is written "Hunger". Perhaps you have thought of using "Hungry" as the title of the book. It is really well written, and it has the meticulous craftsmanship of "prosaic and close to nature".” The letter is included in Eileen Chang Collections “ Zhang watch”《张看》.

C. T. Hsia, author of History of Modern Chinese Fiction, spends twelve pages praising Rice-sprout Song; he calls Rice-sprout Song “a tragic record of the trials of human body and spirit under a brutal system.”

== Characters ==
=== Gold Root T'an (Jingen) ===
The male protagonist of the story, head of T'an household, husband of Moon Scent (Yuexiang) and the father of their daughter, Beckon.The male protagonist of the story, head of T'an household, husband of Moon Scent (Yuexiang) and the father of their daughter, Beckon. He was honored as model peasant initially during land reform, and became a “reactionary” afterwards.

=== Moon Scent T'an (Yuexiang) ===
The female protagonist of the story, the wife of Gold Root (Jingen) and mother of young daughter Beckon. Before the land reform, Yuexiang worked as a maid in Shanghai, and her experiences had shaped her to be a practical, responsible person. Yuexiang understands that, to survive hunger, she has to store and ration food strictly; to that effect, she manages to cheat cadres, turn down her sister-in-law's requests, and even denies her own daughter's hungry pleas. Yuexiang, ultimately cannot prevent her husband from rioting.

=== Beckon ===
Young daughter of Gold Root T'an and Moon Scent T'an. Soft-spoken, dependent on her father. Due to her mother's long absence working in the city, Beckon lacked a motherly figure for the majority of her young childhood and upon her mothers return, the dire situation makes it hard for Beckon and Moon Scent to rebuild that relationship.

=== Big Aunt ===
Boisterous and outspoken aunt of Gold Root, however her husband Big Uncle, Gold Flower and her all rely on the T'an's financially.

=== Big Uncle ===
Gold Root's uncle. Soft-spoken compared to his wife.

=== Comrade Wong ===
Veteran cadre in charge of enforcing the land reform regime and overlooking the peasants of the agrarian village the story is set in, who was clinging to the pursuit of ideology of Communism.

=== Comrade Ku ===
A director-writer who had been sent by the Literary and Artistic Workers' Association all the way from Shanghai to this village to experience and observe the life of the peasants in the countryside during the communist regime and collect material for his next film. He initially was assigned to lodge at Big Aunt and Big Uncle's house but due to a roof leak, he moved to the T'ans' house.

=== Shah Ming ===
A Kan-pu (Cadres who joined the party during the Long March period or the years before 1936), who worked in the telegraph branch. Past love interest of Comrade Wong, who intended to marry her but Ming was forced to escape from the Japanese-held areas into northern Kiangsu, where the New Fourth Army operated, and was separated from Wong.

=== Gold Flower ===
Gold Root's sister who marries Plenty Own Chou, and lives with her husbands family in the neighbouring Chou village.

=== Sister Gold-have-got ===
Big Aunt's daughter-in-law, and the sister-in-law of Gold Root. She lives at Big Aunt and Big Uncle home which neighbours Gold Root and Moon Scent's home. In the novel, she is referred to as the sister-in-law of the family.
