= Hold You Tight (film) =

1998 Hong Kong film by Stanley Kwan

- DVD cover
- Directed by: Stanley Kwan
- Written by: Jimmy Ngai; Elmond Yeung
- Produced by: Raymond Chow
- Starring: Sunny Chan
- Cinematography: Kwan Pun Leung
- Edited by: Maurice Li
- Music by: Keith Leung; Yat-Yiu Yu
- Production company: Kwan's Creative Workshop
- Distributed by: Pony Canyon
- Release date: 14 February 1998 (Hong Kong)
- Running time: 94 minutes
- Country: Hong Kong
- Language: Cantonese

Hold You Tight (Chinese: 愈快樂愈墮落; Jyutping: jyu6 faai3 lok6 jyu6 do6 lok6) is a 1998 Hong Kong romantic drama film directed by Stanley Kwan. The film features full-frontal male nudity.

It is Stanley Kwan's seventh feature film, and he says that his previous two documentaries A Personal Memoir of Hong Kong and Yang ± Yin: Gender in Chinese Cinema had strong influences on making this film: "Both of them evolved from my thoughts on family background and upbringing, my career as a filmmaker, my sexual orientation and my identity as a Chinese man living in a British colony. The film was written for Hong Kong actress Chingmy Yau who plays two roles, a young executive and a worldly boutique owner."

== Cast ==
- Chingmy Yau as Ah Moon/Rosa Gao
- Sunny Chan as Fung Wai
- Eric Tsang as Tong
- Lawrence Ko as A-che
- Sandra Ng Kwan Yue as Video Dealer
- Tony Rayns as Rosa's Friend

== Awards ==
In 1998, Hold You Tight won the FIPRESCI Prize — Special Mention and Silver Screen Award for Best Actor at the Singapore International Film Festival, the Golden Horse Award for Best Supporting Actor and the Alfred Bauer Prize and Teddy Award at the 48th Berlin International Film Festival. The following year, it won the Award of the Pestalozzi Children's Village Foundation at the Fribourg International Film Festival and the Film of Merit award at the Hong Kong Film Critics Society Awards.

== See also ==
- List of Hong Kong films of 1998
- List of lesbian, gay, bisexual or transgender-related films
- List of lesbian, gay, bisexual, or transgender-related films by storyline
- Nudity in film (East Asian cinema since 1929)
