= Jin Suo Ji =

1950 Hong Kong film by Shu-Sun Chiu

- Directed by: Shu-Sun Chiu
- Screenplay by: Eileen Chang
- Starring: Shia Jung
- Release date: 1 August 1950 (Hong Kong)
- Country: Hong Kong

Jin Suo Ji (a.k.a. The Golden Cangue or The Golden Chain) is a 1950 Hong Kong film written by Eileen Chang and directed by Shu-Sun Chiu. The story is based on Chang's 1943 novella of the same name.

== Plot ==
The story revolves around a powerless daughter-in-law named Cao Qiqiao who suffers abuse for years from her stern mother-in-law, who ridicules Cao Qiqiao for being from a lower station. When she becomes a mother-in-law herself, however, she continues to perpetuate the cycle.

== Cast ==
- Shia Jung
