= Yi Yuanji =

11th-century Chinese painter (c. 1000–1064)

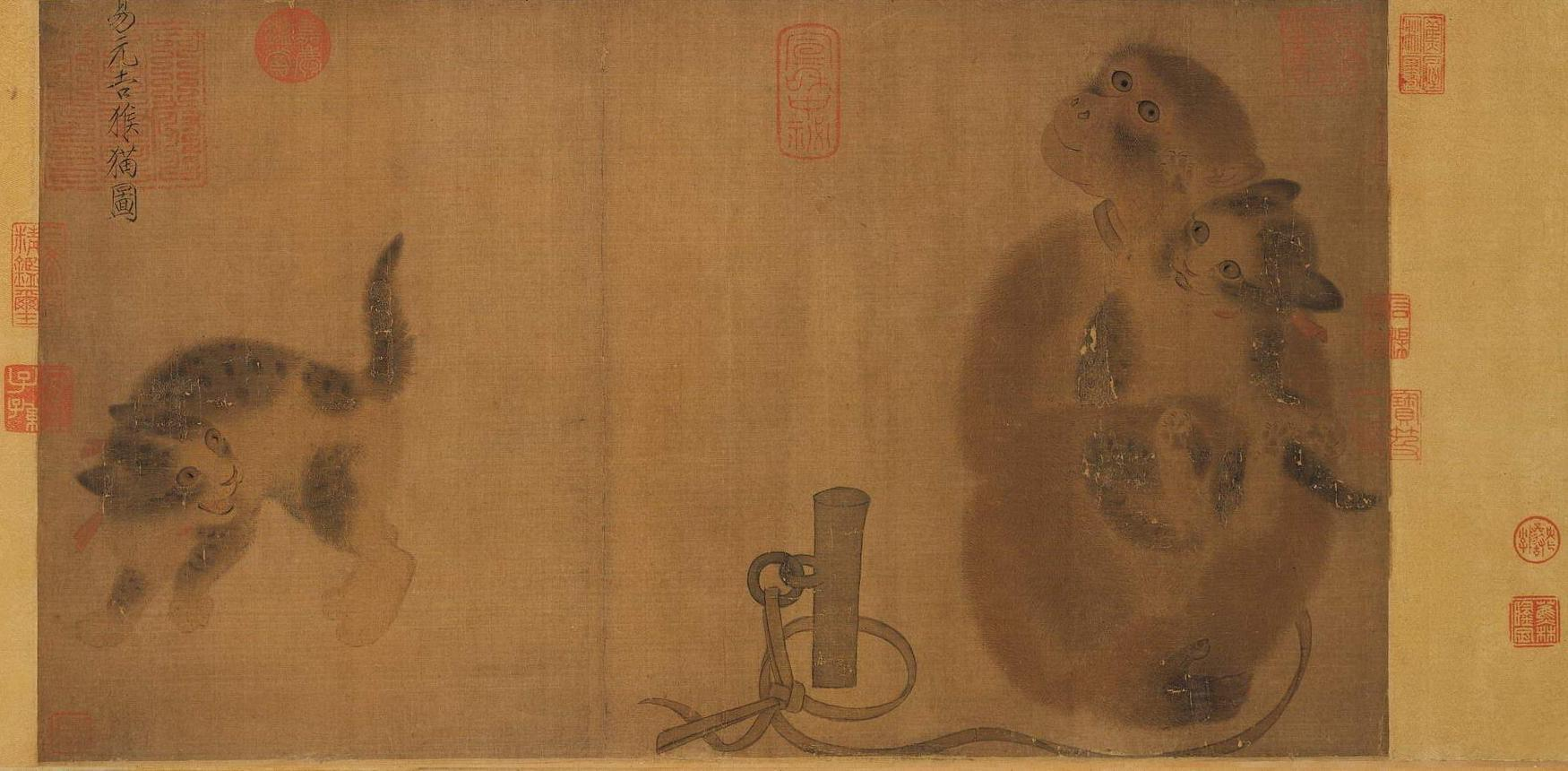
Yi Yuanji, Monkey and Cats (fragment)

Yi Yuanji (Chinese: 易元吉; Wade-Giles: I Yüan-chi; c. 1000, Changsha, Hunan – c. 1064) was a Northern Song dynasty painter, famous for his realistic paintings of animals. According to Robert van Gulik, Yi Yuanji's paintings of gibbons were particularly celebrated.

The 11th-century critic Guo Ruoxu (郭若虚) in his Overview of Painting (图画见闻志, Tuhua Jian Wen Zhi) says the following about Yi's career:

... His painting was excellent: flowers and birds, bees and cicadas he rendered life-like with subtle detail. At first he specialized in flower and fruit, but after he had seen such paintings by Zhao Chang (趙昌), he admitted their superiority with a sigh, and then resolved he would acquire fame by painting subjects not yet tried by the artists of old; thus he began to paint roebucks and gibbons.

He spent months roaming the mountains of southern Hubei and northern Hunan, watching roebucks (獐鹿) and gibbons (猿狖) in their natural environment.

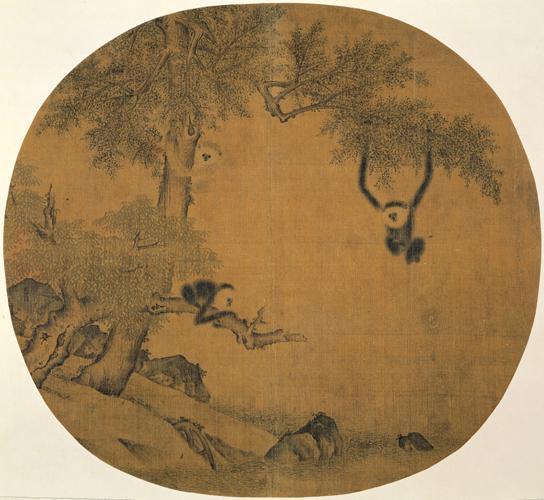
A gibbon painting on a fan by Yi Yuanji

In 1064, Yi Yuanji was invited to paint screens in the imperial palace. Once this job was completed, the Yingzong Emperor, impressed, commissioned him to paint the Picture of a Hundred Gibbons, but the artist died after painting only a few gibbons. A few of his other gibbon paintings have survived, and van Gulik, quite familiar with the behavior of this ape, comments on how natural they look in the paintings. His other work includes depictions of deer, peacocks, birds-and-flowers and fruits-and-vegetables; many of them are kept in the National Palace Museum in Taipei. The Monkey and Cats painting has been described as an outstanding example of playfulness and intimacy. Van Gulik identifies the monkey as a macaque. This painting was featured on a 2004 "Year of the Monkey" stamp from Saint Vincent and the Grenadines.

The image of Yi Yuanji, with his intimate knowledge of nature, has attracted attention from modern Chinese painters.
