= Red Rose, White Rose (novella) =

Chinese novel set in Shanghai

- Author: Eileen Chang (Zhang Ailing)
- Original title: 红玫瑰与白玫瑰
- Translator: Karen S. Kingsbury
- Language: Chinese
- Subjects: Fiction, Literature
- Genre: Novella
- Publisher: Penguin Books Ltd
- Publication date: 1944
- Publication place: China
- English publication date: 15 February 2011
- ISBN: 9780141196145

Red Rose, White Rose (Traditional Chinese: 紅玫瑰與白玫瑰; simplified Chinese: 红玫瑰与白玫瑰) is a novella by Eileen Chang, one of the best-known authors in modern Chinese literature. First published in 1944, the novella was later included in her collection Chuanqi (1944; "The Legend"). In 1994, Hong Kong director Stanley Kwan adapted the novel into a movie of the same name, which was widely acclaimed and entered into the 45th Berlin International Film Festival.

Set in China in the 1930s and 1940s, the story focus on the tangled love between Tong Zhenbao and two women: his spotless wife Yanli ("white rose"), and his passionate mistress Jiaorui ("red rose"). In finely detail, the novel explores the women's survival status, tragic fate, and loss of self-consciousness in a patriarchal society. It describes ordinary people's emotions and marital status under the collision of traditional Chinese culture and Western culture.

== Plot summary ==
"Maybe every man has had two such women – at least two. Marry a red rose, and eventually she'll be a mosquito-blood streak smeared on the wall, while the white one is 'moonlight in front of my bed.' Marry a white rose, and before long she'll be a grain of sticky rice that's gotten stuck to your clothes; the red one, by then, is a scarlet beauty mark just over your heart." This metaphor from the beginning of the novella introduces the theme of the shifting nature of male desire. However, Tong Zhenbao thinks he is different. Returning from studying in Edinburgh with excellent grades, Zhenbao is hired by a famous foreign trading company in Shanghai as a senior staff. He is a model of the ideal modern Chinese man. For the convenience of transportation, he rents a room from his classmate Wang Shihong, who is married to the beautiful and charming Jiaorui.

The day Zhenbao moved in and met Jiaorui, he became deeply fascinated by this rose-like woman. He picks up her stray hairs from the floor tiles and twists them together, "stuff[ing] it into his pocket. His hand stayed there, and his whole body tingled." When Shihong goes to Singapore on business, Zhenbao and Jiaorui fall in love despite their spiritual and moral struggles. However, when Jiaorui tells Zhenbao that she confessed to her husband and was planning to divorce to marry him, Zhenbao is taken aback. He hesitates, becomes annoyed, and eventually falls ill. In the ward, he explains to Jiaorui that their love can only be the love of friends; he cannot give up his entire life, his family, and his friends because of what happened between them. After hearing his hypocritical words, Jiaorui wipes her tears, and without looking back, walks out of his life.

Under his mother's arrangement, Zhenbao meets his white rose and they marry. Compared to Jiaorui, Yanli is a traditional and gentle Chinese woman. Nevertheless, shortly after marriage, Zhenbao begins to think of her as insipid and dull, so he starts visiting prostitutes. When he discovers his wife's clandestine love affair with a tailor whom he perceived to be inferior to him, he becomes more unscrupulous in his philandering. One day, he meets his "red rose" Jiaorui by chance, who has remarried and is carrying a child in her arms, appearing to him old and withered. Finally, one night, Zhenbao becomes conscious of the fact that time waits for no one. The roses, whether they are red or white, become the phantom of reality. The next day, Zhenbao rises and reforms his ways. He makes a fresh start and becomes an honorable man.

== Main characters ==
=== Tong Zhenbao ===
Tong Zhenbao (佟振保) is a model of the modern Chinese man. He rises from poverty and obtains a degree from abroad. Through his excellent performance, he becomes a senior staff member in a foreign trading corporation. He works conscientiously, supports his mother and brother, and even gains a great reputation as "Liuxia Hui" for rejecting his first lover Rose's sexual temptation during his time of study in France. However, for a man who looks so perfect, he has failed in the emotional world. On one hand, he loves the spirit and flesh of the red rose Jiaorui, but because of secular obstacles and traditional views on marriage, he has to refuse to marry her; on the other hand, he loves the white rose Yanli's unsullied reputation but extremely dislikes her vapidity after marriage. Therefore, whether in love or marriage, he feels unsatisfied.

=== Wang Jiaorui ===
Wang Jiaorui (王娇蕊) is an overseas Chinese from Singapore who became a party girl while studying in London. She and Wang Shihong, Zhenbao's classmate, got married in London. Like a red rose, she is ebullient, bright, and charming. Through her relationship with Zhenbao, she falls deeply in love. Summoning her courage, she confesses the affair to her husband and files for divorce to marry her true love. However, her bravery was cruelly rebuffed by Zhenbao, who tells her that they cannot upend their lives and begin a serious relationship. Instead of shrinking back from betrayal, she leaves Zhenbao without looking back. Years later, she remarries and has a child, leading a stable life like an ordinary woman. When Zhenbao reencounters her by chance, she is no longer the red rose he fell in love with before.

=== Meng Yanli ===
Meng Yanli (孟烟鹂) is Zhenbao's wife, the white rose in his life. Coming from a traditional Chinese family, she is innocent, obedient, and well-behaved. Although she has been to university, there is no change in her rigid mind or conservative ideas. All these characteristics meet Zhenbao's requirements for a wife. For Yanli, her husband is her God, and she often says "Wait and ask Zhenbao about it" or "Better take an umbrella, Zhenbao said it's going to rain." Due to her dull personality, Zhenbao feels increasingly bored and goes out to visit prostitutes. Her mother-in-law gradually comes to dislike her because she only births a daughter, not a son. Seeking an outlet in her unbearable family life, she begins an affair with a tailor. However, after her adultery is revealed, she feels ashamed and asks her husband's forgiveness.

== Themes of the novella ==
=== Feminine tragedy ===
The women who have relationships with Zhenbao all end in tragedy. For example, in facing the temptation of his first love Rose, Zhenbao seems to be a gentleman and refuses her advances without hesitation. However, it is actually because he is unwilling to take responsibility and he believes that "marrying her, then transplanting her to his hometown – that would be a big waste of time and money, not a good deal at all." As for Jiaorui and Yanli, both are mistreated by Zhenbao throughout their respective relationships. At the time of the novel's publication, women with such tragic circumstances were not rare in a Chinese society dominated by traditional feudal culture. For the white rose Yanli, her difficult upbringing makes her content with a life of humiliation and lowliness. Even red rose Jiaorui, whose views are influenced by the May Fourth Movement and can pursue self-liberation and true love openly, is regarded by men as a plaything and a woman who cannot be married. This is a common tragedy of women under that specific time and specific class. Whether it is the delicate red rose or the pure white rose, under this cruel society culture norme, they cannot escape their tragic fates.

=== Morbid marriage ===
The marriages depicted in the novella are distorted and abnormal. Wang Jiaorui and her first husband Shihong are in a loveless, transactional marriage. As a result, she indulges in love games and does not hesitate to ask her husband for divorce after meeting her true love, Zhenbao. In Zhenbao's idea of marriage, the wife is the subordinate of the husband. He was "determined to create a world that was 'right,' and he was the master of his own world." This is why he chooses Yanli as his wife instead of Jiaorui. However, their marriage was also flawed and loveless, lacking an emotional foundation that left them with little happiness and harmony. Soon after the wedding, the couple became reticent and taciturn, leading to infidelity and the deterioration of their marriage. Hence, Zhenbao, Yanli, Jiaorui and Shihong all face morbid marriages.

== Background of the novella ==
=== Historical background ===
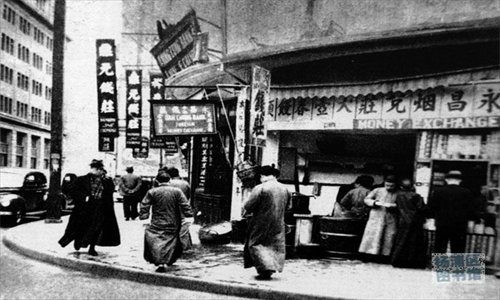
Shanghai in the 1930s

The novel was first published in the year of 1944. Set in the 1930s and 1940, Shanghai was still under Japanese occupation. As an imperial colony, various old values were shaken by the collision of new ideas, including the values of marriage and love. Traditional values of marriage were subverted, and people began to pursue freedom and liberation. However, the incomplete ideological revolution disturbed choices around marriage. At the same time, calls to promote equality between the sexes were continuously strengthened under the influence of the global feminist movement. Although male-dominated society has not been overturned in China, it gave birth to a small group of women with independent ideas. Therefore, in the context of this era, the love between men and women described by Chang is always rebellious, failing and complex. Red Rose, White Rose is also considered one of her responses to the feminist consciousness.

=== Writing inspiration ===
Reflecting the decline of the old culture in this novel, Zhang's original intention is not to criticize, but to show the real tragedies and comedies of ordinary people during that time. In 1971, Zhang mentioned the novel Red Rose, White Rose in an interview with the Taiwanese writer Shuijing, saying, "After writing this story, I feel very sorry for Tong Zhenbao and White Rose. I have met both of them. But of Red Rose, I have only heard of her." Later, she also told a friend: "The hero is a friend of my mother. He told my mother and aunt about this matter. At that time, I was a child, and he thought I didn't understand. Who knows that I'd remember it all?" According to Zhang, it can be inferred that the original idea of this novel came from the true story that she heard. Then, based on her rich imagination and exquisite writing, the novel was born. As for the prototypes of the characters, it is beyond investigation now.

== Literary critiques ==
According to the Chinese contemporary female writer Zhang Yueran (Simplified Chinese: 张悦然, born 7 November 1982), at the end of Red Rose, White Rose, Tong Zhenbao meets Wang Jiaorui again on the bus. Through the rearview mirror of the car, he sees himself crying and feels surprise and shame. For the reader, this scene is more resonant compared to seeing Zhenbao crying directly. In Zhenbao's perspective, he cries not because he lost that love, but because he finally understands the meaning of that lost love.

The novel was thought to be a reflection of story of Chang and Hu Lancheng (Simplified Chinese: 胡兰成, Feb 28, 1906 – July 25, 1981). Chinese writer Cong Qian details her interpretation of Chang in her book: "The novel Red Rose, White Rose is her classical descriptions of the true meaning of love. She was 24 years old when she wrote this manuscript. Maybe she saw this from Hu, just as she later explained that Zhenbao is not a bad guy, to a certain extent, this is also her defense for Hu Lancheng." Similarly, the writer Yu Bin once compared Zhenbao and Hu Lancheng in his book: "With his (Hu Lancheng) self-centeredness and male chauvinism, the most wishful thinking is just the secret wish of all men in the world – that is, Tong Zhenbao's thoughts in the novel Red Rose, White Rose. Possessing both an ideal woman and a secular woman, and they are in order without violation. If so, he is naturally willing to mark a place in his heart for Chang and treat her as a fairy."

Regarding the writing style of the novel, according to writer Liu Chuan E: "Eileen Chang wrote in several places in Red Rose, White Rose about Zhenbao and Jiaorui's flirting styles, such as the temptation to 'break the law', how the heart-to-heart conversation is like an apartment anyone can live in, and the details such as over-skilled kissing are so brilliant."

== Notable quotes ==
- "Maybe every man has had two such women-at least two. Marry a red rose and eventually she'll be a mosquito-blood streak smeared on the wall, while the white one is 'moonlight in front of my bed.' Marry a white rose, and before long she'll be a grain of sticky rice that's gotten stuck to your clothes; the red one, by then, is a scarlet beauty mark just over your heart."
- "And yet the average man's life, no matter how good, is only a 'peach blossom fan.' Like the loyal, beleaguered beauty in the story, you bang your head and blood drips on the fan. Add a few strokes of ink, and the bloodstain becomes a peach blossom. "
- "Jiaorui hid her eyes with her hand. 'Actually, it doesn't matter. My heart's an apartment.' 'So – is there an empty room for rent?' Jiaorui didn't answer. 'I'm not used to living in an apartment. I want to live in a single-family house.' She gave a little grunt of disbelief. 'Well,' she said, 'let's see if you can tear one down and build the other!'
- "Once you've learned to do something, you can't just put it aside and give it up."
- "The mind of a child and the beauty of a grown woman: the most tempting of combinations."
- "The next day Zhenbao rose and reformed his ways. He made a fresh start and went back to being a good man."

== Adaptations ==
=== Movies ===
Red Rose White Rose, a 1994 Hong Kong movie directed by Stanley Kwan (Simplified Chinese: 关锦鹏, born October 9, 1957), starring Joan Chen, Winston Chao and Veronica Yip, entered into the 45th Berlin International Film Festival.

=== Music ===
Eason Chan recorded the Cantonese song "White Rose" from his album What's Going On...? (2006) and Mandarin song "Red Roses" from Admit It (2007).

== See also ==
- Eileen Chang
- Women writers in Chinese literature
- Feminism in China
- Red Rose White Rose
- Traditional Chinese marriage
- Marriage in modern China
