= The Fall of the Pagoda =

Novel by Eileen Chang

The Fall of the Pagoda 雷峰塔
- Author: Eileen Chang
- Language: English
- Genre: Novel
- Publisher: Hong Kong University Press
- Publication date: 2010
- Publication place: China
- Media type: Print (Hardcover & Paperback)
- Pages: 308
- ISBN: 978-988-8028-36-8
- LC Class: PS3553.H27187 F35 2010
- Followed by: The Book of Change

The Fall of the Pagoda (Chinese: 雷峰塔; pinyin: Léi Fēng Tǎ) is a semi-autobiographical novel written by Eileen Chang. Originally written in English in 1963, it was published posthumously by Hong Kong University Press on 15 April 2010. Zhao Pihui translated it into Chinese.

== Language ==
Chang wrote the novel in English, a departure from previous works written in Standard Chinese. Before its publication, the executor of Eileen Chang's estate, Roland Soong, decided to publish The Fall of the Pagoda as a bilingual work, in both English and Chinese. Its translator chose to translate the English novel into Shanghainese, Chang's native language and the vernacular of the Shanghai setting, so as to depict the characters' lives more vividly.

According to the voluminous correspondence between Stephen Soong and Eileen Chang, the writer originally planned to translate the novel into Chinese, but was afraid a story about a young girl's childhood in Shanghai would not resonate with publishers; thus, the plan was terminated.

== Background ==
Chang finished writing the book in 1963 while living in the United States. She hoped to launch her American career with The Fall of the Pagoda and The Book of Change, both written in English, but failed to find a publisher.

The Fall of the Pagoda depicted her childhood years in Tianjin and 1930s Shanghai, while the Book of Changeo revolved around her wartime student days in Hong Kong.

== Plot ==
The Fall of the Pagoda is a narrative about the childhood of the protagonist Lute, who is born into a noble family going through a moral and financial decline. Lute's father is addicted to opium and her mother follows her aunt to live abroad, leaving her and her little brother to live with their servants, aunt Tong, aunt He, aunt Qin etc.

Lute's father Yuxi, the family patriarch, is adrift in post-Qing China. He presides over the family but is unemployed due to his addiction and negative attitude toward life. Lute's mother Lu, influenced by the vanguard of female self-reliance, decides to divorce her husband. This family background causes the little girl to differ significantly from her peers, and she is depicted as being psychologically older than her years.

Lute's brother, Hill, as male successor of his father, is treated as the most important child in the family. The sickly boy is cosseted, over-supervised, and beaten, leaving him morose and even weaker. Lute is often ignored, so she irons has more freedom. She grows up around the family servants and the sprawling extended family, existing amidst a sea of gossip, scandal, jealousy, and fear. The family is bound together in their need for money and the terror of destitution. They live on their ever-diminishing wealth and tarnished prestige, pretending loyalty while seeking their own survival and pleasure. Through Lute's clear-eyed child's perspective, adults are often hypocritical and even her parents are portrayed as relentlessly selfish.

== Characters ==
=== Lute ===
Lute (Chinese: 琵琶; pinyin: pí pā) is the main character in this novel. The whole story tells about the young girl's childhood. She was left to the care of servants, and the companionship of her sickly brother. Unlike her brother, Lute was placed in a place of no consequence but also was given more freedom to do what she wanted.

She was born in a fading aristocratic family in Shanghai. Around her, contradictions and aberrations are normal in Lute's family. Lute grows up watching the adults around her, and there is much to see. The sprawling, extended family and their ever-present servants exist in a sea of gossip, scandal, jealousy and fear. This is a household immersed in a decaying grandeur amid the intoxicating smell of opium. For Lute, the family was like a pagoda imprisoning her which she spent all her life to escape, albeit reluctantly.

It was hard for her to give it up and terminate her memory of the family completely. People most think her father hurt Lute more. But in this novel, you may find out a truth that her mother actually was the person who hurt Lute more. As Lute said to Dew (her mother), not father: "He never hurt me because I never loved him".

=== Hill ===
Hill (Chinese: 陵; pinyin: líng), Lute's young brother, was sickly and infected with tuberculosis by his step-mother. As the only boy of the family, he would be the successor of his father. Compared to his elder sister, the boy was cosseted, over-supervised and beaten so that he was weak and unsociable. Most of time, he kept silent to everything around him and no one knew him, even his only elder sister who got along with him every day. Hill died of the negligence of parents, just 17 years old. His death seemed like a secret to Lute to which she never can find the key.

=== Dew ===
Dew (Chinese: 露; pinyin: lù), Lute and Hill's mother, was an open-minded woman who had the courage to divorce with her husband in that old days fulling of feudal ideology. But she was also selfish and cruel to give up her little daughter and son. Due to the abnormal family relationship, young Lute always observed the world around her with distrust. Dew became the very person who hurt Lute the most. Generally speaking, she was not a qualified mother.

=== Yuxi ===
Yuxi (Chinese: 榆溪; pinyin: yú xī) was the master of the noble family. He indulged himself in debauchery and divorced his wife, Dew-Lute and Hill's mother. Usually, he did not have enough time to get along with his children because of opium addiction.

=== Servants ===
There were many servants in this noble family, such as aunt Tong, aunt Qin, aunt He and so on. Taking aunt He for example, she brought up Yuxi's father, Yuxi and Yuxi's daughter, Lute. But at last, aunt He was ejected from the family which she served almost all her life. This was the servants' fate. In that old days, they were always in a powerless position suffering oppression and enslavement.

== Social factors ==
Eileen Chang lived during a period of transition in China.

== The author and her work ==
Eileen Chang, whose real name is Zhang Ailing (张爱玲), was born in a decaying noble family. She has the extremely prominent family background that her grandfather, Zhang Peilun (张佩纶) was a noted Qing Dynasty statesman; her grandmother Li Juou (李鞠耦) was the firstborn daughter of Li Hongzhang (李鸿章), minister of Qing state court. Eileen Chang is now recognized as one of the greatest modern Chinese writers, though she was completely erased from official histories in mainland China for her first husband Hu Lancheng (胡兰成). She was the most popular writer in Japanese-occupied Shanghai during World War II, with English and Chinese stories focusing on human frailties rather than nationalist propaganda. For her non-committal politics and idiosyncrasies, she was boycotted by fellow writers after the war and forced to the margins of literary respectability.

Eileen Chang is noted for writing that deals with relationship between male and female in the history of modern Chinese literature. Being a prolific and exceptional writer in modern China, she combined the art with life perfectly and created a large number of outstanding literary works. Her novels, plays, essays and literary comments such as Lust, Caution, Jin Suo Ji, Love in a Fallen City, Eighteen Springs (novel) and The Fall of the Pagoda helped her gain reputation and had set up a unique art building for her.
