= Red Rose White Rose =

1994 Hong Kong film by Stanley Kwan

- Film poster
- Directed by: Stanley Kwan
- Screenplay by: Edward Lam
- Based on: Red Rose, White Rose by Eileen Chang
- Produced by: Wong Cheuk-hon
- Starring: Joan Chen
- Cinematography: Christopher Doyle
- Edited by: Brian Schwegmann; Chan Kong-Hiu
- Music by: Siu Chung
- Production companies: First Film Organisation; Golden Flare Films Co., Ltd.
- Release date: 10 December 1994 (Hong Kong)
- Running time: 110 minutes
- Country: Hong Kong
- Language: Mandarin

Red Rose White Rose (Chinese: 紅玫瑰白玫瑰; pinyin: Hóng méi guī bái méi guī) is a 1994 Hong Kong drama film directed by Stanley Kwan, based on the novella Red Rose, White Rose by Eileen Chang. It was entered into the 45th Berlin International Film Festival.

== Plot ==
Set in 1930s and 1940s Shanghai, the film follows Tong Zhenbao (Winston Chao), a Western-educated Chinese man navigating between passion and propriety. After brief romances abroad with a Parisian prostitute and a Eurasian woman named Rose in England, Zhenbao returns to Shanghai and becomes a lodger in the home of his friend Wang Shihong.

Zhenbao begins a passionate affair with Wang Jiaorui (Joan Chen), his friend's wife, whom he thinks of as his "red rose." Despite his feelings for her, Zhenbao ends the relationship to preserve his reputation as a respectable man. He instead marries Meng Yanli (Veronica Yip), a refined and proper woman he considers his "white rose."

However, Zhenbao soon grows restless and irritated with his dutiful wife. After he discovers Yanli's secret affair with her tailor, she suffers a nervous breakdown but eventually recovers. The film concludes with Zhenbao encountering Jiaorui by chance on a streetcar years later, prompting him to reflect on his choices.

== Cast ==
- Joan Chen as Wang Jiao-Rui
- Winston Chao as Tung Zhen-Bao
- Veronica Yip as Meng Yen Li
- Zhao Chang as Tung Tu-Bao
- Shi Ge as Rose
- Shen Hua as Mr. Chang
- Shen Tong Hua as Wang Ze Hong
- Shen Fan Qi as Wei Ying
- Yanyu Lin as Wu Ma
- Sabine Bail as Purple Rose

== Production ==
The film was produced by First Film Organisation Limited with Wong Cheuk-hon (黃卓漢) serving as producer.

== Release ==
Red Rose White Rose was released in Hong Kong on 10 December 1994 and was screened at the Berlin International Film Festival in February 1995. In the Philippines, the film was released exclusively at SM Megamall beginning on 5 May 1995.
