= Ferdinand Reyher =

American screenwriter, novelist

Ferdinand Maximilian Reyher (July 26, 1891 – October 24, 1967) was an American screenwriter, novelist, and newspaper correspondent. Reyher was also a notable friend and collaborator of Bertolt Brecht.

== Early life ==
Ferdinand Reyher was born on July 26, 1891, in Philadelphia, Pennsylvania, to Max Reyher and Lina Sichel Reyher. Reyher's family had German heritage, specifically the town of Büdingen. In 1913, Reyher obtained his master's degree in English from Harvard University. Reyher spent the following year teaching English at the Massachusetts Institute of Technology. From 1915 to 1916, Reyher was a war correspondent for notable papers such as the New York Evening Sun, the Boston Globe, and the Boston Post. In 1917, Reyher married Rebecca Hourwich, an American suffragist and author. The couple had a daughter, Faith, in 1919 and divorced in 1934.

== Career ==
Reyher's career as a writer spanned several decades and different mediums. Reyher wrote novels such as Man, the Tiger, and the Snake (published by Putnam in 1921), I Heard Them Sing (published by Little, Brown, and Co. in 1946), and David Farragut, Sailor (published by Lippincott in 1953). Reyher also had a career as a screenwriter and script doctor for studios such as RKO, MGM, and Paramount during the 1930s and 1940s. Despite finding some work, Reyher's career would begin to decline after his move to Hollywood. Much of Reyher's work dealt with leftist themes.

Reyher's work meant that he was acquainted with prominent figures in both the literary world and Hollywood. Reyher's friends and acquaintances included Wallace Stevens, Ford Madox Ford, John Huston, and Paul Henreid. The most notable of these relationships was his friendship with the playwright Bertolt Brecht, whom he met in Berlin in 1927. Reyher helped to popularize Brecht's work in the United States, and was amongst those who helped Brecht and his family immigrate to the United States in 1941. Throughout Brecht's time in the U.S. Reyher and Brecht attempted to collaborate on several projects, most significant of which was Life of Galileo. Reyher was the one who suggested that Brecht begin the play, although he originally suggested Reyher write the story as a film so Reyher could sell the film in the United States. Reyher, who had recently fled from Nazi Germany, hoped that a story about Galileo would earn money. The film version of the story was never made, but it did lay the groundwork for what would eventually become the play version of Life of Galileo. Reyher was one of the few people who the notoriously headstrong Brecht would tolerate disagreement from. Reyher also attempted to teach the newly immigrated Brecht about American culture and advocated for its positive aspects, something that Brecht was skeptical of.

== Selected filmography ==
Title	Year	Notes
Cleopatra	1963	screenplay
The Subterraneans	1960	screenplay
The Crowded Sky	1960	writer
The World, the Flesh and the Devil	1959	screen story
The Hasty Heart	1949	screenplay
Mildred Pierce	1945	screenplay

== Later years ==
In March 1956 Reyher met Eileen Chang at the MacDowell Colony for the Arts in New Hampshire. Chang was born in China, and like Reyher worked as both a novelist and a screenwriter. The couple married in August of that year. The marriage was tumultuous due to the couple's financial problems. Chang supported herself and her husband by traveling to Taiwan and Hong Kong to earn money writing screenplays. In the final years of Reyher's life his health declined and he suffered from a string of strokes. He spent his final years bed-ridden before dying in the fall of 1967 in Cambridge, Massachusetts.
