= Qing Chang Ru Zhan Chang =

1957 Hong Kong film by Feng Yueh

- Directed by: Feng Yueh
- Screenplay by: Eileen Chang
- Produced by: Robert Chung
- Starring: Lin Dai; Yu Chin; Yuen Chor
- Cinematography: Chieh Fan
- Edited by: Chao-Hsi Wang
- Release date: 29 May 1957 (Hong Kong)

Qing Chang Ru Zhan Chang (aka The Battle of Love) is a 1957 Hong Kong comedic film directed by Feng Yueh from a script by Eileen Chang. The film was a favorite with critics at the time of its release.

== Cast ==
- Dai Lin
- Yu Chin
- Yuen Chor
