= Winston Chao =

Taiwanese actor (born 1960)

- Born: Chao Wen-hsuan; 9 June 1960 (age 65); Taiwan
- Occupation: Actor
- Years active: 1993–present
- Awards: Lily Award for Best Actor; 2006 Those Were the Days; SIFF Award for Most Popular Actor; 2007 Road to Dawn

Chinese name
- Traditional Chinese: 趙文瑄
- Simplified Chinese: 赵文瑄
Transcriptions
Standard Mandarin
- Hanyu Pinyin: Zhào Wénxuān
Yue: Cantonese
- Jyutping: Ziu6 Man4-syun1

Winston Chao Wen-hsuan (born 9 June 1960) is a Taiwanese actor, film director, and voice artist . He came to international attention for his performance in the 1993 film The Wedding Banquet. He is also known for his roles in Red Rose White Rose (1994), which was screened at the 45th Berlin International Film Festival, and Eat Drink Man Woman, and for his five portrayals of Sun Yat-sen, notably in the films The Soong Sisters (1997), Road to Dawn (2007) and 1911 (2011). His notable television roles include the adaptation of Cao Yu's play Thunderstorm (1997), a double role in the historical drama Palace of Desire, the biographical mini-series The Legend of Eileen Chang (2004), the historical drama Da Tang Fu Rong Yuan (2007), the adaptation of Ba Jin's novel Cold Nights (Han ye, 2009), and the portrayal of Confucius (2011). He acted in the Indian Tamil film, Kabali (2016), in a villainous role opposite Rajinikanth. He has also appeared in the English-language films Skiptrace (2016) and The Meg (2018).

== Filmography ==
=== Feature films ===
Year	Title	Role	Notes
1993	The Wedding Banquet 喜宴	Wei-Tong Gao / 高偉同	
1993	Top Cool 想飛 ~ 傲空神鷹		
1994	In Between 新同居時代	Wong Man Fai / 黃文輝	a.k.a. Conjugal Affairs, The New Age of Living Together
1994	Eat Drink Man Woman 飲食男女	Li Kai / 李凱	
1994	Red Rose White Rose 紅玫瑰白玫瑰	Tong Zhen-bao / 佟振保	
1995	Xiu Xiu 繡繡和她的男人	Dr. Li Zhao	
1995	I Want to Go on Living 我要活下去	Go Chun	
1996	Your Black Hair and My Hand 談情說愛	Wenshan / 文山	a.k.a. Crazy Little Thing Called Love
1996	Tonight Nobody Goes Home 今天不回家	Chen Siming / 陳斯明	
1996	Thunder Cop 新喋血雙雄	Chiu Kwok-ho / 趙國豪	
1996	In a Strange City 在陌生的城市	Hsiang Kuo-chien / 向國前	
1997	The Island of Greed 黑金	Minister of legal department	
1997	Intimates 自梳	Wah / 華	
1997	Destination: 9th Heaven 衝上九重天	Chin Cheng / 錢程	
1997	The Soong Sisters 宋家皇朝	Sun Yat-sen / 孫中山	
1998	A Little Life-Opera 一生一台戲	Sanpeng / 三朋	
1998	Burning Harbor 燃烧的港湾	Sato / 佐藤	
2002	The Touch 天脈傳奇	Yin's father / 嫣父	
2005	Those Were the Days 随风而去	Hu Weichen / 胡维臣	television film Lily Award for Best Actor
2007	Road to Dawn 夜·明	Sun Yat-sen / 孙中山	SIFF Press Prize for Most Attractive Actor; Guangzhou Student Film Festival Award for Most Popular Actor
2011	1911 辛亥革命	Sun Yat-sen / 孙中山	Nominated – Hundred Flowers Award for Best Actor
2012	Great Rescue 非常营救	Chu Fucheng / 褚辅成	
2013	The Palace 宫锁沉香	Emperor Kang Xi	
2015	Zhong Kui: Snow Girl and the Dark Crystal 钟馗伏魔：雪妖魔灵	Zhang Dao Xian	
2015	Nezha		
2015	Surprise 萬萬沒想到	Murong Hao	
2016	Chinese Wine 国酒	Boss Hua	
2016	Xuanzang 大唐玄奘	Emperor Taizong of Tang	A Chinese-Indian movie.
2016	Kabali கபாலி	Tony Lee	A Tamil-language Indian production.
2016	Skiptrace	Victor Wong	
2018	The Meg	Dr. Minway Zhang	
2019	Pegasus	Wan He Ping	
2021	I Dreamed a Dream	Li Shi Hao	
2021	Be Somebody	Photo studio owner	
2024	Daughter's Daughter	Old Johnny	
TBA	Love War		

=== Television series ===
Year	Title	Role	Notes
1997	Thunderstorm 雷雨	Zhou Ping / 周萍	
1997	The Voyage Home 歸航	Gu Li / 顧力	a.k.a. Daoguang mi shi (道光秘史)
1997	Bonds of Blood 千秋家國夢	Xu Baiting (许拜庭) / Xu Chongzhi (许崇智)	
1998	Haihai de rensheng 海海的人生	Ho Wei / 何偉	
1999	Huanxi renjia 歡喜人家		a.k.a. Happy Together
1999	Maid in Green 綠衣紅娘	Yang Shaohui / 杨绍辉	
2000	Jiayuan 家園	Lin Huaizhong / 林怀中	
2000	Palace of Desire 大明宮詞	Xue Shao (薛绍) / Zhang Yizhi (张易之)	
2001	Fame 星夢戀人	Huo Da / 霍达	
2001	A War Diary 战争日记		
2001	Sun Zhongshan 孙中山	Sun Yat-sen / 孙中山	
2002	Hu xiao cangqiong 虎嘯蒼穹	Xiao Taiping / 萧太平	a.k.a. Yuan yu (原獄)
2002	The Merchant 錢王	Wang Chi / 王炽	
2003	Yuxue nan'er 浴血男兒	Chen Hai / 陈海	
2004	Guo bao 國寶	Fan Sicheng / 范思成	
2004	The Legend of Eileen Chang 她從海上來 ~ 張愛玲傳奇	Hu Lancheng / 胡蘭成	a.k.a. Shanghai wangshi (上海往事)
2004	Xiangqi miren 香氣迷人	Li Chun'en / 李纯恩	
2006	Harmony 天和局	Wang Hongtu / 王鸿图	a.k.a. Ma dian (马店)
2006	The Big Blast 大爆炸	Wu Gang / 吴刚	a.k.a. Tufa shijian (突發事件)
2007	Da Tang Fu Rong Yuan 大唐芙蓉園	Emperor Xuanzong of Tang / 唐玄宗	
2008	Great Porcelain Merchant 大瓷商	Tao Shengren	
2009	Han ye 寒夜	Wang Wenxuan / 汪文宣	
2009	Da guo yi 大國醫	Guo Yishan	
2009	Archrivals 對手	Wen Weijun	
2009	Once Upon a Time on the Strait 海峽往事	Lin Wenxuan	
2009	Maid in the Big House 大屋下的丫鬟	Chen Tianheng	a.k.a. Bai De Tang (百德堂)
2009	Tie jian dan daoyi 鐵肩擔道義	Sun Yat-sen / 孙中山	
2010	Xiao Xiang Road 1 潇湘路1号	Tong Shuangwei	a.k.a. Country in Chaos (沧海横流)
2010	Chuang tianxia 闖天下	Zhao Tianfu	
2011	The Legend of Incorruptible Stone 廉石傳奇	Zhang Zhao (Zibu)	
2011	Confucius 孔子	Confucius / 孔子	
2011	Wu Zetian mishi 武则天秘史	Emperor Gaozong of Tang / 唐高宗	
2011	Family Reunion 團圓	Liu Yu	
2011	Defend Army Soul 护国军魂传奇	Liang Qichao / 梁启超	
2012	Shouwang de tiankong 守望的天空	Yuan Weiguo	
2012	Sui Tang yingxiong 隋唐英雄	Emperor Yang of Sui / 杨广	
2013	Daughter's Return 千金归来	Pan Weilin /潘伟森	
2013	The Legend of Dancing Prince 舞乐传奇	异牟寻	
2014	The Last Emperor 末代皇帝传奇	Puyi / 溥仪	
2015	Lonely Gourmet 孤独的美食家	伍郎	
2015	大舜	Emperor Yao / 尧	
2015	The Legend of Mi Yue 芈月传	King Wei of Chu / 楚威王	
TBA	Tian xing jian 天行健	Zhou Zixuan	filmed in 2010
2017	Xuan-Yuan Sword Legend: The Clouds of Han	Zhuge Liang	
2018	Negotiator	Xie Tianyou	
2019	Poetry of the Song Dynasty 大宋宫词	Zhao Tingmei	

== Awards and nominations ==
Year	Award	Category	Film	Result
2006	Lily Awards (百合奖)	Best Actor shared with Zhou Xiaobin	Those Were the Days	Won
2007	Shanghai International Film Festival	Press Prize for Most Attractive Actor	Road to Dawn	Won
2007	Guangzhou Student Film Festival (广州大学生电影节)	Most Popular Actor	Road to Dawn	Won
2012	Hundred Flowers Awards	Best Actor	1911	Nominated
