= Yang ± Yin: Gender in Chinese Cinema =

1996 Hong Kong-British documentary by Stanley Kwan

- Film poster
- 男生女相：华语电影之性别
- Directed by: Stanley Kwan
- Written by: Elmond Yeung; Edward Lam
- Produced by: Paula Jalfon; Benny Wong Chung-Yam
- Narrated by: Tony Rayns
- Cinematography: Christopher Doyle
- Edited by: Maurice Li
- Music by: Yo Yo Yu
- Production companies: BFI; Kwan's Creation Workshop
- Distributed by: BFI (UK)
- Release date: September 30, 1996
- Running time: 80 minutes
- Countries: Hong Kong; United Kingdom

Yang ± Yin: Gender in Chinese Cinema is a 1996 documentary by filmmaker Stanley Kwan exploring representations of queerness and LGBT identity in film from Greater China. The film was produced and partially funded by the British Film Institute to mark the centenary of cinema.

== Synopsis ==
Using archival footage and specially shot interviews with major filmmakers and actors, director Stanley Kwan constructs a visual essay that attempts to demonstrate that queerness has existed in Chinese cinema since its very earliest movies. He argues that China has provocatively dealt with questions of gender and sexuality in cinema, in spite of social conservatism and government censorship. Chia-Chi Wu writes, "In its queering of Chinese-language film – reclaiming or recreating Chinese texts for queer interpretation – Yang±Yin undercuts heteronormativity and patriarchy foundational to nationalist discourses of Chinese communities and creates a queer imaginary that is 'pan-Chinese'."

Kwan draws attention to the coded or subtle queerness of Chinese cinema. For example, director Zhang Che describes "possible 'Freudian' readings" of his film The Slaughter in Xi'an (1990), thus, according to Fran Martin, "validating the power of the spectators agency and never denying the erotic tensions bubbling beneath supposedly chaste canons of Confuscian brotherhood."

The film is also notable for Kwan publicly coming out as gay in it. In a scene towards the end of the film, he reveals his sexuality to his mother by asking her to reflect on her own ideas and experiences of gender norms and queerness.

Interviewees in the documentary include Ang Lee, Kaige Chen, Leslie Cheung and John Woo.
