= The Golden Cangue =

Chinese novella

- Title page for Modern Chinese Stories and Novellas: 1919–1949 (1981) which The Golden Cangue appears within as a novella, though The Golden Cangue was first published in 1943.
- Author: Eileen Chang
- Original title: 金鎖記
- Language: Chinese
- Published: 1943

Chinese name
- Traditional Chinese: 金鎖記
- Simplified Chinese: 金锁记
- Literal meaning: Golden Cangue
Transcriptions
Standard Mandarin
- Hanyu Pinyin: Jīn Suǒ Jì

The Golden Cangue (金鎖記) is a 1943 Chinese novella by Eileen Chang. The author's own English translation appeared in the anthology Modern Chinese Stories and Novellas: 1919–1949 (1981) published by Columbia University Press. Fu Lei was an enthusiastic critic of the story, while C. T. Hsia considered it "the greatest novelette in the history of Chinese literature". Later the story was rewritten as the novel The Rouge of the North (怨女).

== Plot ==
The Golden Cangue illustrates the decadence of the idle rich. Set in Shanghai, the novelette unfolds the degeneration of the heroine, Ch'i-ch'iao, and her family. The golden cangue symbolizes the destructiveness of the protagonist.

Ch'i-ch'iao, the main protagonist, is the daughter of a sesame oil shopkeeper. She is forced to marry into the Chiang family for wealth. She's a benefit-finder in her life, but there are so many destructive elements in her life. She lives in an environment of denial. Originally, Ch'i-ch'iao was to be a concubine, but due to the physical disabilities of Ch'i-ch'iao's husband, the Second Master of the Chiang family, the matriarch of the Chiang family knows he will be unable to marry a woman from a family of their social standing. Ch'i-ch'iao is arranged to become his legal wife, and as such she is then bound to serve him faithfully. The other two wives of the Chiang sons come from titled and respectable families. All of Ts’ao Ch’i-ch’iao husband's family and even the servants look down on Ch'i-ch'iao due to her family's low social status. Ch'i-ch'iao is a tragic heroine who lives an unhappy and unfulfilled life, and the story follows her descent into increasingly manipulative and twisted behavior as a result. She has been forced to suppress her true freewill and passion, and in place of this she pursues money. However, by the story's end, it becomes evident that money cannot save her, but become a further type of oppression, like golden shackles.

The novella's plot is divided in two parts: first, the period from the protagonist's marriage to the death of her mother-in-law and her husband, and the period after their deaths. In the first part Ch'i-ch'iao lacks freedom; in the second part she achieves toxic control over others.

As the story goes on, she eventually falls in love with Chi-tse, her brother-in-law. But Chi-tse keeps a distance with Ch'i-ch'iao because of the rites. Then, in such an environment, Ch'i-ch'iao's soul is oppressed by her desire for wealth, and her personality becomes more and more distorted. After dividing up the family property and moving out of the family's collective home, she becomes obsessed with money and power, to the point where she destroys her children's future to fulfill her erratic obsession with power and control. Ch'i-ch'iao pampers her son into an opium-smoking and brothel-visiting. In addition, Ch'i-ch'iao manipulates her daughter, Ch’ang-an, by exerting abusive control on her. She persuades her daughter not to trust any men, thus polluting her daughter's life and preventing her from finding lifelong happiness. She turns her own bitterness into a heavy golden cangue and cleaves people to her, which eventually leads them to the abyss of hell and misfortune.

== Characters ==
Family of Chiang:

- Eldest Master, the eldest son of the Chiang family.
- Tai-chen, the wife of the eldest son.
- Second Master, the husband of Ch’i-ch’iao, who is a cripple from a wealthy family called Chiang.
- Ch’i-ch’iao, the protagonist of the novella “The Golden Cangue” who is from the lower-class family, she forced by her family to marry a cripple from a wealthy family Chiang. She suffer from her life and ruins the life of her children named Ch’ang-an and Ch’ang-pai.
- Ch’ang-an, the daughter of Ch’i-ch’iao, who is a lover of T’ung Shih-fang . Her mother ruins her relationship with T’ung Shih-fang.
- Ch’ang-pai, the son of Ch’i-ch’iao, who became an opium addict.
- Chih-Shou, the wife of Ch’ang-pai.
- Miss Chuan, the concubine of Ch’ang-pai, who committed suicide by swallowing raw opium.
- Chiang Chi-tse, the third son of Chiang family, who had a secret flirtation with Ch’i-ch’iao.
- Lan-hsien, the wife of Chiang Chi-tse.
- Chiang-hsing, the daughter of Lan-hsien.

Other characters:

- T’ung Shih-fang, a man returned from German who is a lover of Ch’ang-an.
- Little Shuang, the maid of Ch’i-ch’iao, who used to wait on Old Mistress.
- Feng hsiao, the maid of Lan-hsien.

== Symbols within the novella ==
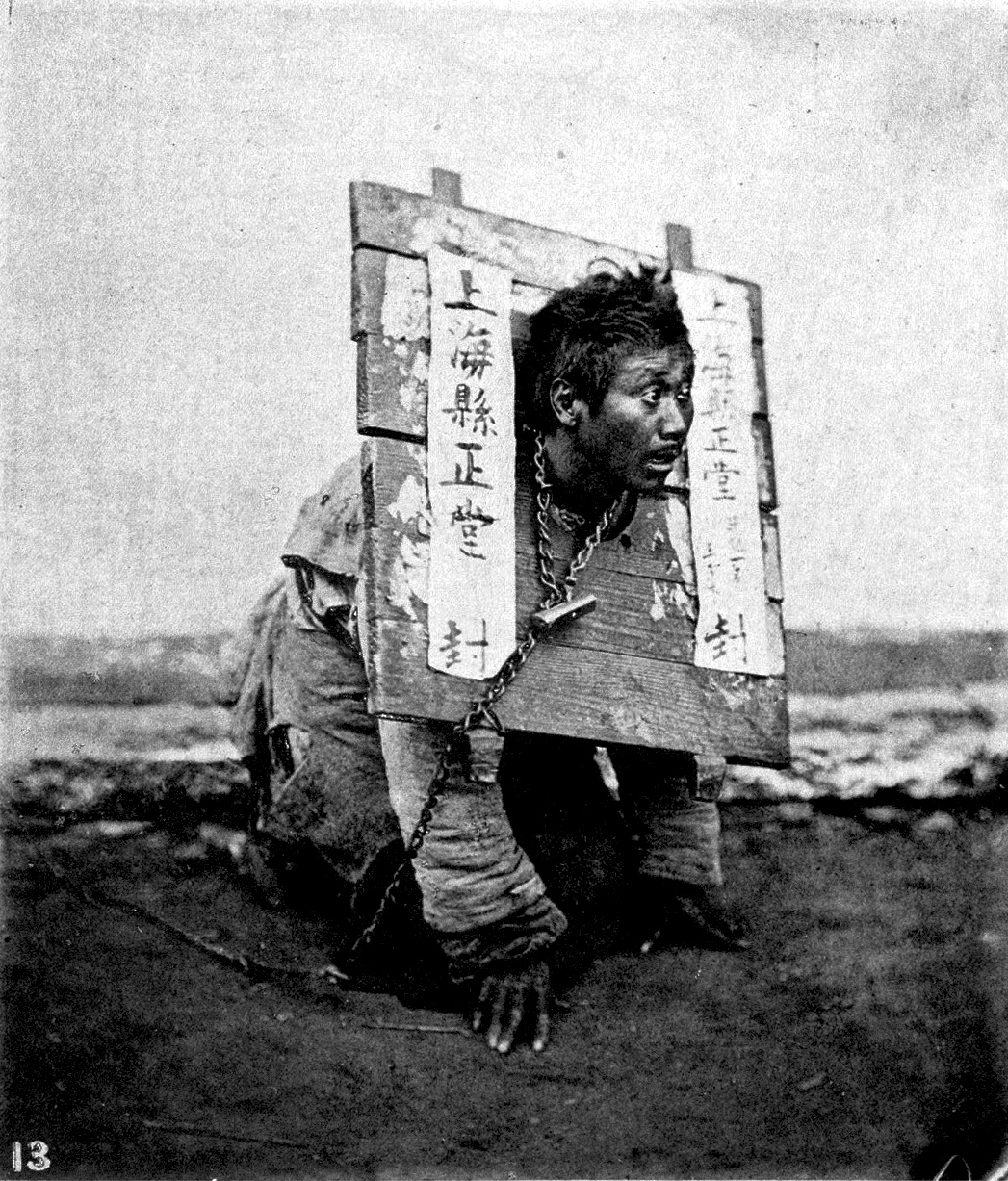
Photo of a man in a cangue.

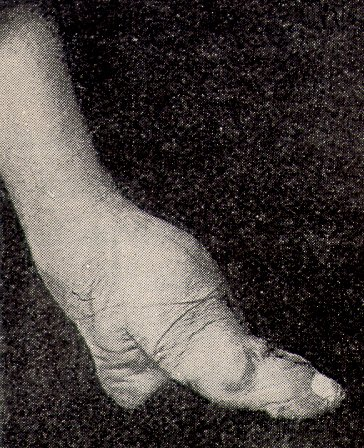
Photo of foot binding.

Golden Cangue: In this story the golden cangue symbolizes the protagonist's destructive action, which metaphorically bears the frame used to hold prisoners in ancient China; she is both imprisoned and being imprisoned. Ch’i-Ch’iao uses the heavy edges to chop down several people; those that did not die were half killed. She mutilates others psychologically by golden cangue, while the instrument ironically stands for her own exploitation.

Foot-binding: Foot binding is a special custom from the ancient times to modern times. There are many possible origins for the practice of foot binding. They use cotton and silk to bind the feet of girls tightly to form the special foot shape of "three-inch bound feet." In the old times Chinese women's small feet came to symbolize many female-related qualities, including weakness, brokenness, passivity, delicacy, and sensuality.

Familial hierarchy: In the Golden Cangue the familial hierarchy is dismantled, which contrasts cornerstone elements of the traditional Chinese family structure: a family was well balanced, observed strict filial piety and respected elders. Ch’i-Ch’iao is hated by her immediate family, in particular her children and her in-laws. This is certainly a representation of the broken relationships within Chinese family.

== The metaphor of the moon within the novella ==
Throughout the Story of the Moon

Eileen Chang uses a unique technique of the images. The image of the moon appears repeatedly in the novella. The moon is synonymous with reunion, warmth and happiness in Chinese culture. However, in "the Golden Cangue", the moon is cold and lonely, which seems to be foreshadowing the tragic fate of the characters. The beginning is written about the moon 30 years ago, while the end appears again. At the beginning of the novel, she writes that, "Shanghai thirty years ago on a moonlit night... maybe we did not get to see the moon of thirty years ago. To young people the moon of thirty years ago should be a reddish-yellow wet stain the size of a copper coin, like a teardrop on letter paper by To-yün Hsüan, worn and blurred. In old people's memory the moon of thirty years ago was gay, larger, rounder, and whiter than the moon now". At the end of the story, Eileen Chang writes that, "the moon thirty years ago are dead but the story of thirty years ago is not yet ended- can have no ending". The moon is a symbol of eternity that never changes, showing that the tragedy of life will never stop and that the story goes on.

The Moon Foretells the Fates of the Characters

The image of the moon appears at important moments that foreshadow the fates of the characters. At the beginning of the story, the moon is described as: “It was almost dawn. The flat waning moon got lower, lower and larger, and by the time it sank, it was like a red gold basin”. It implies that Ts’ao Ch’i-ch’iao's life is gradually falling, sinking just like the moon .

When Ch’ang-an is forced to decide not to go to school, The description of the moon is: "Through the window the moon had come out of the clouds. A dark gray sky dotted sparsely with stars and a blurred chip of a moon, like a lithographed picture. White clouds steaming up underneath and a faint halo over the street lamp showing among the top branches of a tree". From Ch’ang-an's point of view, the moon is cold and vague, symbolizing her helplessness and frustration; in addition it also relates to her later life that is also grey and without light.

The Moon Highlights the Characters' Psychology

When Ts'ao Ch’i-ch’iao instigates Ch’ang-an to discuss his affair with his wife, the description of the moon is: "The living room curtains had been sent to be washed. Outside the windows the moon was barely visible behind dark clouds, a dab of black, a dab of white like a ferocious theatrical mask"(Chang 214). When Chih-shou is tortured and suffered throughout her life, she nearly has a nervous breakdown and the description of the moon is: "Outside the windows there was still that abnormal moon that made one's body hairs stand on end all over-small white sun brilliant in the black sky". At this time, the description of the moon is ferocious, as if with hate, which echoes Ts’ao Ch’i-ch’iao's abnormal psychology. The contrast between black and white is so intense that it feels bizarre.

When the moon appears in the story, it announces a tragic event and negative emotions, this could be associated with the character's inner desolation and misery. The usage of the moon image in "The Golden Cangue" makes the connotation profound and brings readers endless thinking and imagination.

== Adaptations ==
=== TV series ===
The Golden Cangue was adapted into a 2004 Chinese TV series directed by Mu Deyuan (穆德远).

=== Stages ===
The Golden Cangue has been adapted for the stage numerous times, with the most famous version the one written by Wang Anyi in 2004. Wang's version was first directed by Huang Shuqin and performed by Shanghai Dramatic Arts Centre in 2004. Beginning in 2007, Ann Hui directed Wang's adaptation with Hong Kong's Perry Chiu Experimental Theatre over 80 times in Hong Kong, mainland China, and Singapore. Perry Chiu's husband Clifton Ko is reportedly planning a film version.

=== Beijing opera ===
The script from Eileen Chang's novella, "The Golden Cangue" was adapted for the Beijing Opera by Wang An-chi and Zhao Xue-jun. This was the first time Chang's work had been adapted into a Beijing Opera.

== Work evaluation ==
Lei Fu published "On Eileen Chang's Novel" in "Vientiane" under the name Xunyu. He made an incisive artistic analysis of "The Golden Cangue" from multiple dimensions, such as structure, rhythm, color, psychology, style and creation technique. He also thought that "The Golden Cangue" was "one of the most beautiful harvest" in the literary world at that time.

Rachel Leng in her work on “Eileen Chang’s Feminine Chinese Modernity: Dysfunctional Marriages, Hysterical Women, and the Primordial Eugenic Threat Most of Eileen Chang’s Novels” posits that most critics depict Eileen Chang’s novels as apolitical. However, this author argues against it when explaining that within the Golden Cangue, Eileen Chang elaborates on social critique of eugenic practices linked to reproduction. Leng describes the novel as a description of a fictional world where Chinese modernity has a deep psychological impact on women. Most notably, it has had an effect on the embitterment, physical degradation, broken social and marital relationships in modern China.
