= Zhao Chang =

Chinese painter

Zhao Chang (趙昌)
- Born: Guanghan, Later Shu
- Died: Song

Chinese name
- Traditional Chinese: 趙昌
- Simplified Chinese: 赵昌
Transcriptions
Standard Mandarin
- Hanyu Pinyin: Zhào Chāng
- Wade–Giles: Chao^{4} Ch'ang^{1}

Zhao Changzhi
- Traditional Chinese: 趙昌之
- Simplified Chinese: 赵昌之
Transcriptions
Standard Mandarin
- Hanyu Pinyin: Zhào Chāngzhī
- Wade–Giles: Chao^{4} Ch'ang^{1}-chih^{1}

Zhao Chang (fl. 10th century), courtesy name Changzhi, was a Chinese painter during the Song dynasty.

He was a disciple of flower-and-bird painter Teng Changyou (滕昌祐). He also used the methods of the Southern Tang painter Xu Chongsi.

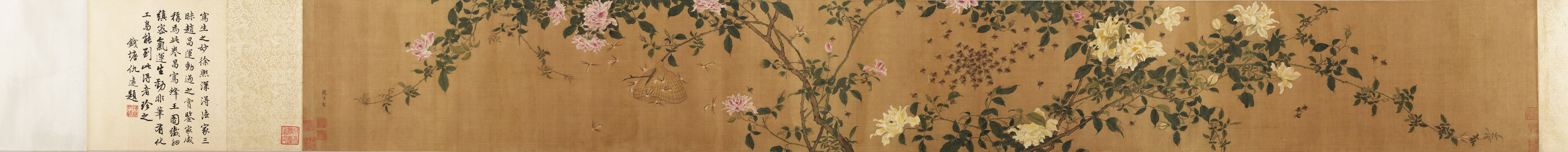
《Yellow Roses and Bees, Pink Roses and Wasps》 By Zhao Chang
