= Eileen Chang =

Chinese-American writer and screenwriter (1920–1995)

- 張愛玲
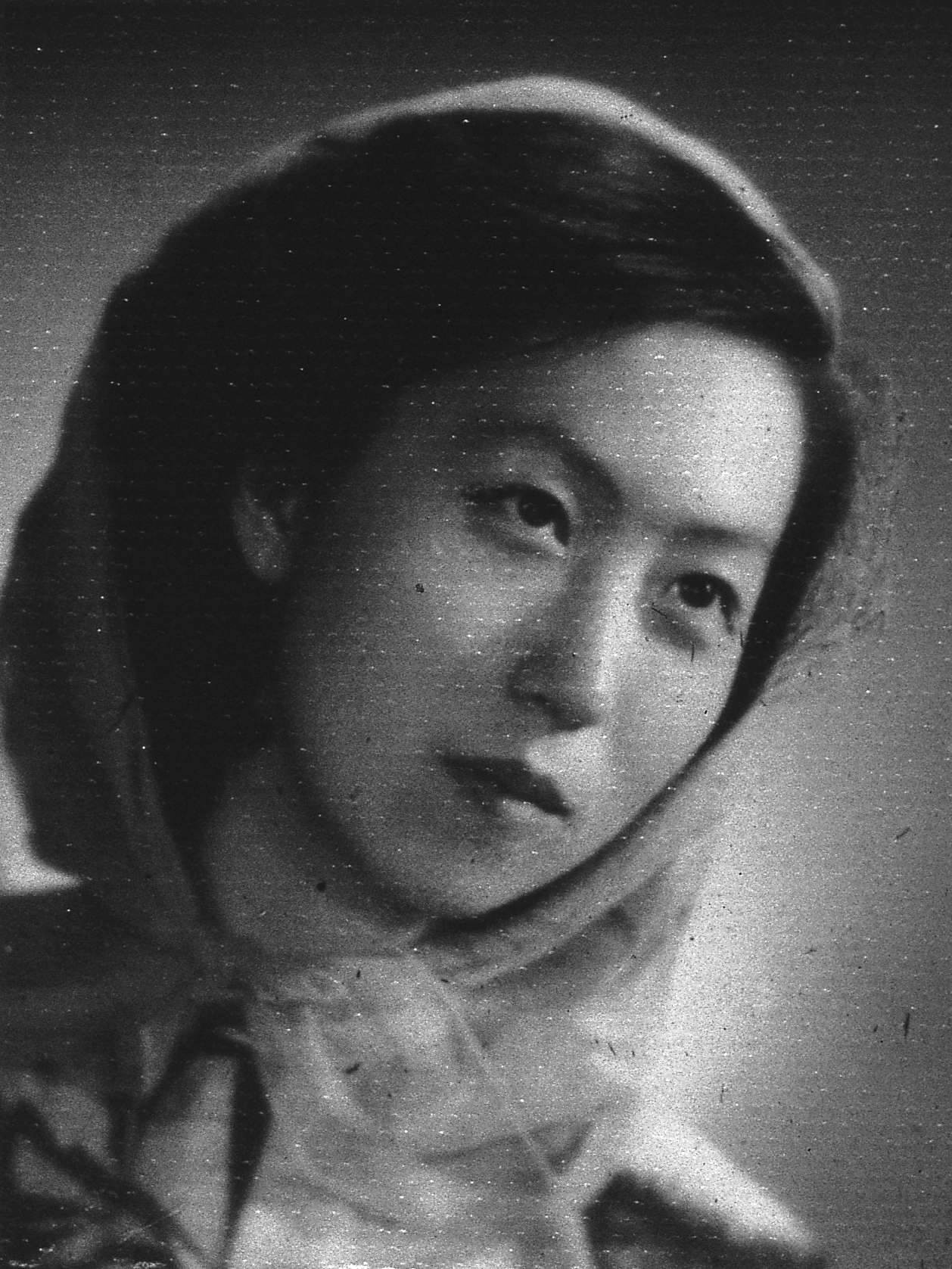
- Chang in 1944
- Born: Zhang Ying (張煐); September 30, 1920; Shanghai, Republic of China
- Died: September 8, 1995 (aged 74); Los Angeles, California, U.S.
- Education: University of Hong Kong; St. John's University
- Occupations: Novelist; essayist; literature author; playwright; screenwriter; short story writer
- Spouses: Hu Lancheng (m. 1944; div. 1947) Ferdinand Reyher (m. 1956; died 1967)
- Relatives: Zhang Peilun (paternal grandfather); Li Hongzhang (great-grandfather)
- Writing career
- Pen name: Liang Jing (梁京)
- Period: 1932–1995
- Genre: Literary fiction
- Notable works: Lust, Caution; Love in a Fallen City

Chinese name
- Traditional Chinese: 張愛玲
- Simplified Chinese: 张爱玲
Transcriptions
Standard Mandarin
- Hanyu Pinyin: Zhāng Àilíng
- Gwoyeu Romatzyh: Jang Ayling
- Wade–Giles: Chang^{1} Ai^{4}-ling^{2}

Liang Jing
- Chinese: 梁京
Transcriptions
Standard Mandarin
- Hanyu Pinyin: Liáng Jīng
- Wade–Giles: Liang^{2} Ching^{1}

Eileen Chang (traditional Chinese: 張愛玲; simplified Chinese: 张爱玲; pinyin: Zhāng Àilíng; Wade–Giles: Chang^{1} Ai^{4}-ling^{2}；September 30, 1920 – September 8, 1995), also known as Chang Ai-ling or Zhang Ailing, or by her sometime pen name Liang Jing (梁京), was a Chinese and American writer. Chang was born in Shanghai to a family with aristocratic lineage and received a bilingual education in Chinese and English. She gained literary prominence in Japanese-occupied Shanghai between 1943 and 1945. In 1952, she left the newly founded People's Republic of China for British Hong Kong and later the United States. Since her rediscovery in the late 1960s, she has been one of the most widely read and critically acclaimed writers in the Chinese-speaking world.

== Life ==
=== Childhood and youth ===
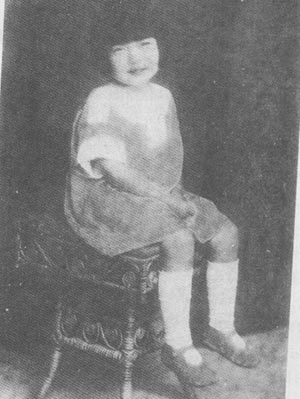
Chang as a child

Chang was born Zhang Ying (張煐) in Shanghai, China on September 30, 1920. She was the first child of Zhang Zhiyi (張志沂; 1896–1953) and Huang Suqiong (黃素瓊; 1893–1957). Chang's maternal great-grandfather, Huang Yisheng (黃翼升; 1818–1894), was a prominent naval commander. Chang's paternal grandfather, Zhang Peilun (1848–1903) married Li Ju'ou (李菊耦; 1866–1916) and was son-in-law to Li Hongzhang, an influential Qing court official. She was also raised by her paternal aunt Zhang Maoyuan (張茂淵; 1898–1991).

In 1922, when Chang was two years old, the family relocated to Tianjin. When she was three, her father introduced her to Tang poetry. Beginning in 1924, her father often brought back prostitutes or concubines and became heavily addicted to opium, which led to fights between her parents. During this time, Chang's mother decided to travel with her aunt to study in France. In 1927, after Chang's father promised to end his drug usage and extramarital affairs, Chang and her mother came back and settled in Shanghai. Chang's parents eventually divorced in 1930; she and her younger brother Zhang Zijing (張子靜; 1921–1997) were raised by their father.

At the age of 18, Chang contracted dysentery. Instead of seeking medical treatment, her father beat her and forced her to stay in her bedroom for six months. Chang eventually ran away to live with her mother and then stayed with her mother for nearly two years, until she went to university.

=== Education ===
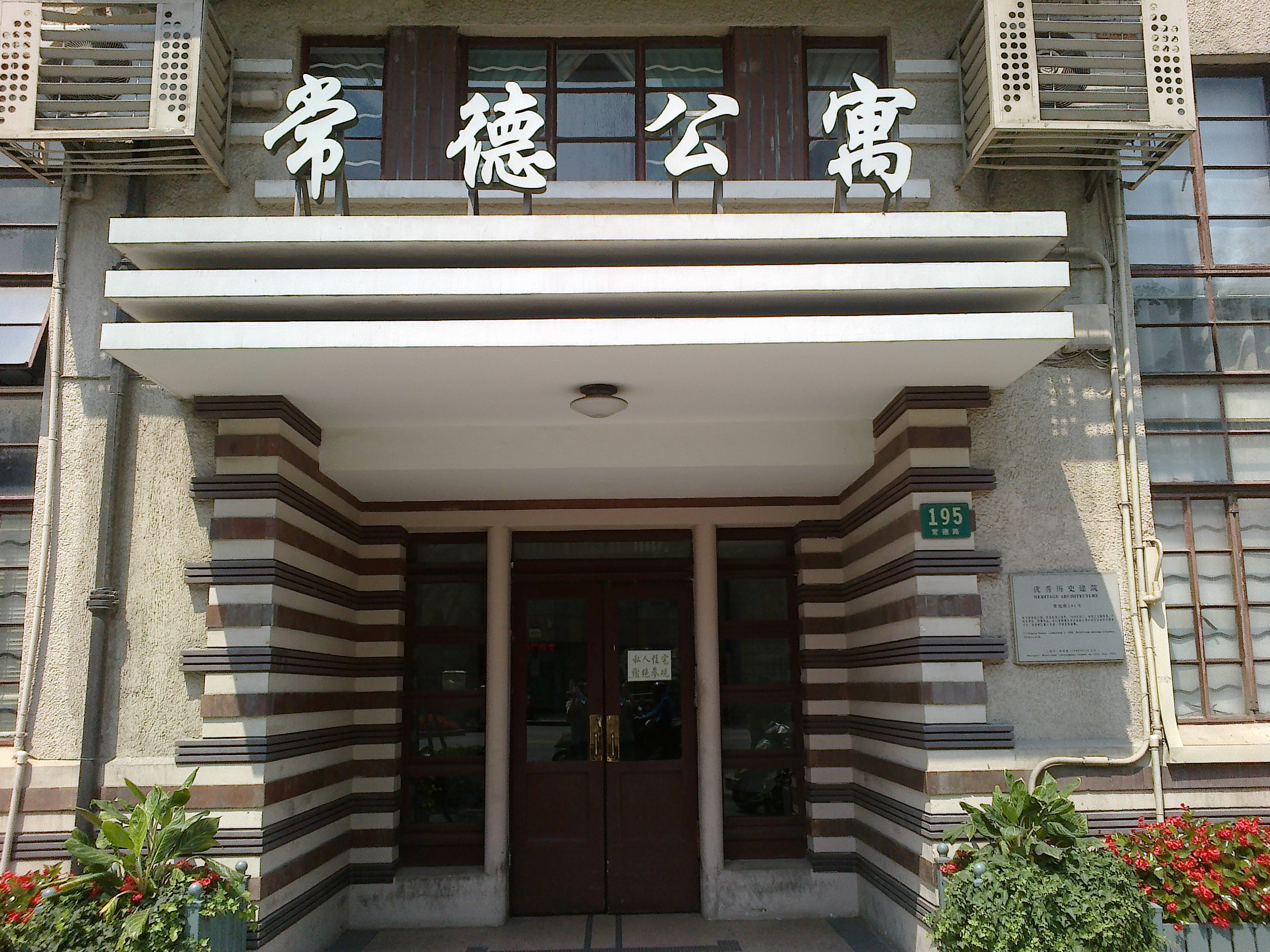
The gate of Eddington House in Shanghai. Eileen Chang lived here in 1942. (Picture taken in June 2013)

Chang started school at age 4. Chang had obtained excellent English skills besides her native Chinese. In 1937, she graduated from an all-female Christian boarding high school, St. Mary's Hall, Shanghai, even though her family was not religious.

At an early age, under her mother's influence, Chang began painting, playing piano, and learning English.

In 1939, Chang was accepted to the University of London on a full scholarship, but was unable to attend due to World War II. Instead, she studied English Literature at the University of Hong Kong, where she met her lifelong friend, Fatima Mohideen (炎櫻; died 1995). When Chang was one semester short of earning her degree in December 1941, Hong Kong fell to the Empire of Japan. Chang's famous works were completed during the Japanese occupation.

=== Marriages ===
In 1943, Chang met her first husband Hu Lancheng when she was 23 and he was 37. They married the following year in a private ceremony. Fatima Mohideen was the sole attendee. In the few months that he courted Chang, Hu was still married to his third wife. Although Hu was labelled a traitor for collaborating with the Japanese during World War II, Chang continued to remain loyal to Hu. Shortly thereafter, Hu chose to move to Wuhan to work for a newspaper. While staying at a local hospital, he seduced a 17-year-old nurse, Zhou Xunde (周訓德), who soon moved in with him. When Japan was defeated in 1945, Hu used another identity and hid in the nearby city of Wenzhou, where he married Fan Xiumei (范秀美). Chang and Hu divorced in 1947.

In 1956, while living in MacDowell Colony, New Hampshire, Chang met and became involved with the American screenwriter Ferdinand Reyher, a Philadelphia native nearly 30 years her senior. During the time they were briefly apart in New York (Chang in New York City, Reyher in Saratoga), Chang wrote to Reyher that she was pregnant with his child. Reyher wrote back to propose. Although Chang did not receive the letter, she telephoned the following morning to inform Reyher she was arriving in Saratoga. Reyher had a chance to propose to her in person, but insisted that he did not want the child. Chang had an abortion shortly afterward. On August 14, 1956, the couple married in New York City. After the wedding, the couple moved back to New Hampshire. After suffering a series of strokes, Reyher eventually became paralyzed, before his death on October 8, 1967.

=== Death ===
On September 8, 1995, Chang was found dead in her apartment on Rochester Avenue in Westwood, Los Angeles, by her landlord. According to her friends, Chang had died of natural causes several days before her building manager discovered her body, after becoming alarmed that she had not answered her telephone. Her death certificate states that she died from cardiovascular disease. In accordance with Chang's will, she was cremated without any memorial service, and her ashes were scattered in the Pacific Ocean.

After Chang's death, Stephen Soong (宋淇; 1919–1996) became the executor of her estate, succeeded by his son Roland Soong (宋以朗). In 1997, the Soong family donated some of Chang's manuscripts to the East Asian Library at the University of Southern California, including the English translation of "The Sing-song Girls of Shanghai" and the unfinished manuscript of the novel "The Young Marshall." In 2015, Roland Soong handed Eileen Chang's manuscripts to Hong Kong scholar Rosanna Fong (馮睎乾) for organization and research.

== Career ==
=== Shanghai ===
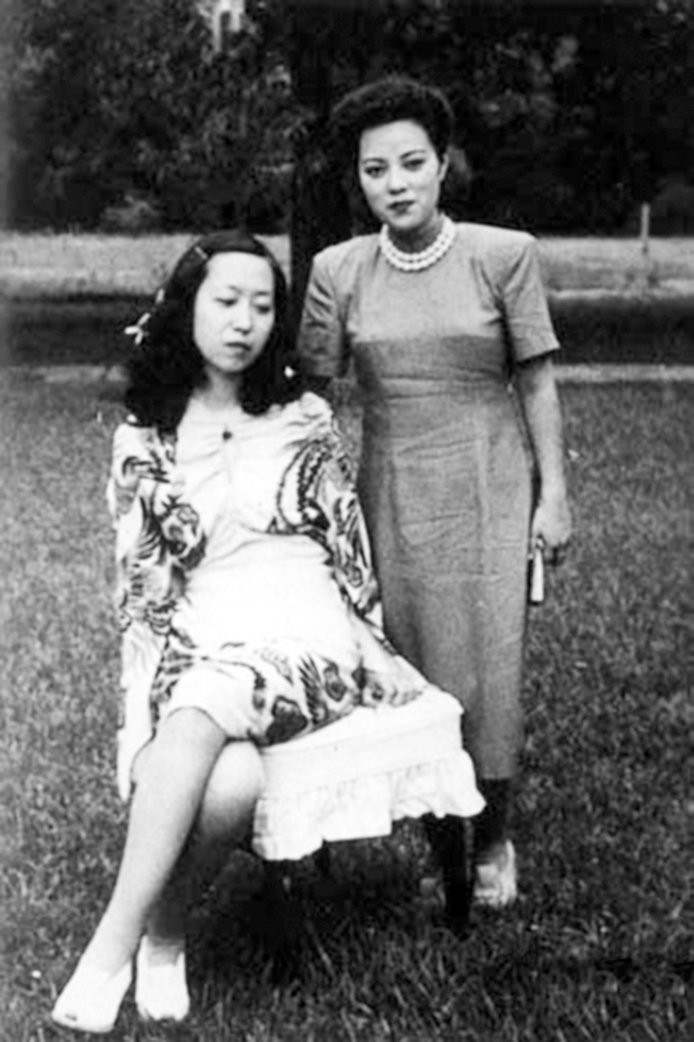
Chang and famous actress Li Hsiang-lan (Yoshiko Yamaguchi) in Shanghai, July 1945

At the age of 10, Chang's mother renamed her as Aìlíng, a transliteration of Eileen, in preparation for her entrance into an English school. While in high school, Chang read Dream of the Red Chamber, one of the Four Great Classical Novels of Chinese literature, which influenced her work throughout her career. Chang displayed great literary talent and her writings were published in the school magazine. The following year, she wrote her debut short novel at the age of 12.

Chang's writing was heavily influenced by the environment in which she lived. Shanghai and Hong Kong in the 1940s were the background of many of her earlier novels. She was known for her "aesthetic ambivalence" where the narrative style and language were reminiscent of the traditional "linked-chapter" novel while the setting was more in line with modern urban melodramas. Chang also sought to probe and examine the psychology of her characters.

In 1943, Chang was introduced to the prominent editor Zhou Shoujuan and gave him a few pieces of her writing. With Zhou's support, Chang soon became the most popular new writer in Shanghai. Within the next two years, she wrote some of her most acclaimed works, including Love in a Fallen City and The Golden Cangue. In her English translation of The Golden Cangue, Chang simplified English expressions and sentence structures to make it easier for readers to understand.

Several short stories and novellas were collected in Romances (Chuan Qi, 傳奇) (1944). It instantly became a bestseller in Shanghai, boosting Chang's reputation and fame among readers and also the Chinese literary circle.

A collection of her essays appeared as Written on Water (Líu Yán 流言) in 1945. Her literary maturity was said to be far beyond her age. As described by Nicole Huang in the introduction to Written on Water, "The essay form became a means for Eileen Chang constantly to redefine the boundaries between life and work, the domestic and the historic, and meticulously to weave a rich private life together with the concerns of a public intellectual." In 20th century China, Chang experimented with new literary language. In her essay entitled "writing of one's own," Chang retrospectively remarks on her use of a new fictional language in her novella Lianhuantao (Chained Links).

In the early years of her career, Chang was famously associated with this comment:

To be famous, I must hurry. If it comes too late, it will not bring me so much happiness ... Hurry, hurry, or it will be too late, too late!

=== Hong Kong ===
In 1945, Chang's reputation waned due to postwar cultural and political turmoil. It worsened after the defeat of the Nationalist government by the Communists in the Chinese Civil War. Chang left mainland China for Hong Kong in 1952, realizing her writing career in Shanghai was over. In Hong Kong, she worked for the United States Information Service (USIS), which promoted United States interests overseas. During this time, she wrote two anti-communist works, The Rice Sprout Song (Yang Ge, 秧歌) and Naked Earth (Chidi zhi lian, 赤地之戀, sometimes known in English as Love in Redland), both of which she later translated into Chinese and published in Taiwan. The Rice Sprout Song was Chang's first novel written entirely in English.

Chang wrote Naked Earth at the direct request of the USIS and used a plot outline supplied by USIS agents. According to academic Brian DeMare, the book is a consequence of the anti-Communist paranoia of the United States Cold War mentality and lacks the poetry and nuance of Chang's other works.

She also translated a variety of English works into Chinese, most notably The Old Man and the Sea by Ernest Hemingway and "The Legend of Sleepy Hollow" by Washington Irving. Chang's translation of The Old Man and the Sea was seen as Cold War propaganda for the USIS and is argued to have directly influenced her writing and translating of The Rice Sprout Song.

=== United States ===
In 1955, Chang moved to America, struggling to become an English writer. Her work was rejected by publishers many times. Chang's move from Hong Kong to the U.S. marked an important turning point in her literary career.

In the 1960s, Chang was constantly searching for new job opportunities, particularly ones that involved translating or writing screenplays. Chang once tried to adapt a screenplay for Hollywood with Chinese elements, but was unsuccessful because the agent thought the role had too much content and psychological changes. Chang became an American citizen in 1960 and headed to Taiwan for more opportunities, returning to the United States in 1962.

Betrayal is an overarching theme in Chang's later works, notably in her English essay "A Return to the Frontier" (1963) and one of her last novels Little Reunions (2009, published posthumously). Compared to her previous works, there are many more tragedies and betrayals in her writings later in her life.

In 1962, when she resided in San Francisco, Chang started writing the English novel The Young Marshal based on the love story between the Chinese general Zhang Xueliang and his wife, Zhao Yidi, with an aim to break into the American literary world. However, due to the multitude of Chinese names and complex historical background in the book, her editor gave a poor evaluation of the initial chapters, which greatly undermined Chang's confidence in the writing. With her interest in Zhang Xueliang waning, she abandoned the story. In 2014, Eileen Chang's literary executor, Roland Soong, managed to have the unfinished novel published, with a Chinese translation by Zheng Yuantao.

In 1963, Chang also wrote two novels based on her own life: The Fall of the Pagoda and The Book of Change. Both were believed to be her attempts to offer an alternative writing style to mainstream America; she did not succeed. The full-length novels were not published until 2010.

In 1966, Chang had a writing residency at Miami University in Oxford, Ohio. In 1967, Chang held a short-term job at Radcliffe College. In 1969, upon the invitation of Shih-Hsiang Chen, a professor of Oriental Languages at the University of California, Berkeley, Chang became a senior researcher at the Center for Chinese Studies of Berkeley. Her research topics included Chinese Communist terminology and the novel Dream of the Red Chamber. In 1971, the year Chen died, Chang left her post at Berkeley. In 1972, Chang relocated to Los Angeles. In 1975, she completed the English translation of The Sing-song Girls of Shanghai, a late Qing novel written in Wu Chinese by Han Bangqing. The manuscript for the translation was found among her papers at the University of Southern California and published posthumously in 2005.

In 1978, Crown Magazine published Chang's novellas Lust, Caution and Fu Hua Lang Rui, as well as her short story "Xiang Jian Huan".

In 1990, Chang began writing an essay "Table of Love and Hate" (愛憎表), a reflection of her thoughts during her school days. The essay was published posthumously in the July 2016 issue (Issue 155) of Taiwan's Ink magazine and in the autumn-winter issue of China's Harvest magazine.

== Influence ==
Chang was a realist and modernist writer. Her most important contribution was her construction of a unique wartime narrative, one that deviated from the grand accounts of national salvation and revolution. She sought to recount the seemingly irrelevant details and experiences of daily life of ordinary men and women in periods of social change and violence. Chang was also known for her view of modern history, displaying colours, lines, and moods in her writing and juxtaposition of historical reality with the domain of domesticity.

During the 1970s, Chang's legacy had such a significant impact on many creative writers in Taiwan that several generations of "Chang School writers" (張派作家) emerged, notably Chu T’ien-wen, Chu T’ien-hsin, Lin Yao-de, and Yuan Chiung-chiung.

With collective efforts to unearth the literary histories of the pre-revolutionary days in the post-Mao era, a renewed Eileen Chang "fever" swept through the streets of mainland China. The name Eileen Chang became synonymous with the glories of a bygone era. As with Taiwan in the 1970s, a group of young women authors who were clearly inspired by Chang rose to prominence in the 1980s and 1990s. Other notable Mainland China authors influenced by Chang include Wang Anyi, Su Tong, and Ye Zhaoyan.

Chang has been listed as one of the four women literary geniuses in Shanghai during the Republic of China era, alongside Su Qing, Guan Lu, and Pan Liudai. Chang has also been listed as one of the four women literary geniuses during the Republic of China era, along with Lü Bicheng, Xiao Hong and Shi Pingmei. Dominic Cheung, a poet and professor of East Asian languages at the University of Southern California, said that had it not been for the Chinese civil war, Chang would have been a recipient of the Nobel Prize in Literature.

== In popular culture ==
Eileen Chang's works are often adapted for screens. The best known is probably Ang Lee's film Lust, Caution (2007), based on her novella of the same name, starring Tony Leung Chiu-wai and Tang Wei. The film won the Golden Lion award at the Venice Film Festival and Golden Horse Award for best film in 2007. Other film adaptations include Love in a Fallen City (1984) and Love After Love (2020), the latter based on Chang's Aloeswood Incense: The First Brazier; both films were directed by Ann Hui. Chang's Love in a Fallen City was also adapted into stage performances by the Hong Kong Repertory Theatre in 1987, 2002, and 2005. In 2006, the theatre took the Cantonese performance to New York, Shanghai, and Toronto.

A 20-episode TV series, The Legend of Eileen Chang, written by Wang Hui-ling and starring Rene Liu, aired in Taiwan in 2004.

Malaysian singer Victor Wong wrote a song titled "Eileen Chang" ("Zhang Ailing") in 2005.

Taiwanese writer Luo Yijun includes quotations and themes from Chang's writings and life in his novel Daughter.

In 2020 on the occasion of the centennial celebration of Chang's birth, an online exhibition Eileen Chang at the University of Hong Kong was presented on the website for the University Museum and Art Gallery, Hong Kong. The exhibition pieced together a narrative that highlights the early stages of Chang's literary career.

== Bibliography ==
Year	Chinese title		English title	Notes
1943	沉香屑·第一爐香	Chenxiang Xie: Di-Yi Lu Xiang	Aloeswood Incense: The First Brazier	Novella
1943	傾城之戀	Qing Cheng Zhi Lian	Love in a Fallen City	Novella
1943	金鎖記	Jin Suo Ji	The Golden Cangue	Novella; self-translated into English in 1981
1944	連環套	Lian Huan Tao	Chained Links	Novella
1944	紅玫瑰與白玫瑰	Hong Meigui Yu Bai Meigui	Red Rose, White Rose	Novella
1945	創世紀	Chuang Shi Ji	Genesis	Novella
1945	流言	Liu Yan	Written on Water	Essay collection
1947	多少恨	Duo Shao Hen	So Much Regret	Novella
1948	半生緣	Ban Sheng Yuan	Half a Lifelong Romance	Novel; originally serialized as 十八春 (Eighteen Springs)
1950	小艾	Xiao'ai	Xiao'ai	Novella; published under pseudonym Liang Jing
1954	赤地之戀	Chidi Zhi Lian	Naked Earth	Novel; self-translated into English in 1956
1955	秧歌	Yangge	The Rice Sprout Song	Novel; written in English and self-translated into Chinese
1967	怨女	Yuan Nu	The Rouge of the North	Novel; written in English
1978	浮花浪蕊	Fu Hua Lang Rui	Flowers Adrift, Blossoms Afloat	Novella
1979	色，戒	Se, Jie	Lust, Caution	Novella
2004	同學少年都不賤	Tongxue Shaonian Dou Bu Jian	Classmates Then All Successful Now	Novella; published posthumously
2009	小團圓	Xiao Tuan Yuan	Little Reunions	Novel; completed in 1979 and published posthumously
2010	雷峰塔	Lei Feng Ta	The Fall of the Pagoda	Novel; written in English; completed in 1963 and published posthumously
2010	易經	Yi Jing	The Book of Change	Novel; written in English; completed in 1963 and published posthumously

== Films ==
The following scripts were penned by Chang:

- Bu Liao Qing (1947) (不了情, Unending Love, modified from novel 多少恨, published as movie script)
- Long Live the Mistress! (1947) (太太萬歲, Long Live the Missus!)
- Miserable at Middle Age (1949) (哀樂中年)
- The Golden Cangue (1950) (金鎖記)
- The Battle of Love (1957) (情場如戰場, script written in 1956)
- A Tale of Two Wives (1958) (人財兩得, script written in 1956)
- The Wayward Husband (1959) (桃花運, script written in 1956)
- The June Bride (1960) (六月新娘)
- The Greatest Wedding on Earth (1962) (南北一家親)
- Father Takes a Bride (1963) (小兒女)
- The Greatest Love Affair on Earth (1964) (南北喜相逢)
- Please Remember Me (1964) (一曲難忘, a.k.a. 魂歸離恨天)

The following are films adapted from Eileen Chang's novels:

- Love in a Fallen City (1984) (傾城之戀)
- Rouge of the North (1988) (怨女)
- Red Rose White Rose (1994) (紅玫瑰與白玫瑰)
- Eighteen Springs (1997) (半生緣)
- Lust, Caution (2007) (色，戒)
- Love After Love (2020) (第一爐香)

== See also ==
- Chinese literature
- Women writers in Chinese literature
- List of Chinese authors
- List of graduates of University of Hong Kong
- Su Qing – a Republican-era writer
- Nellie Yu Roung Ling – first Chinese modern dancer, author and fashion designer

== Portrait ==
- Zhang Ailing. A Portrait by Kong Kai Ming at Portrait Gallery of Chinese Writers (Hong Kong Baptist University Library).
