= Hu Lancheng =

Chinese writer and politician

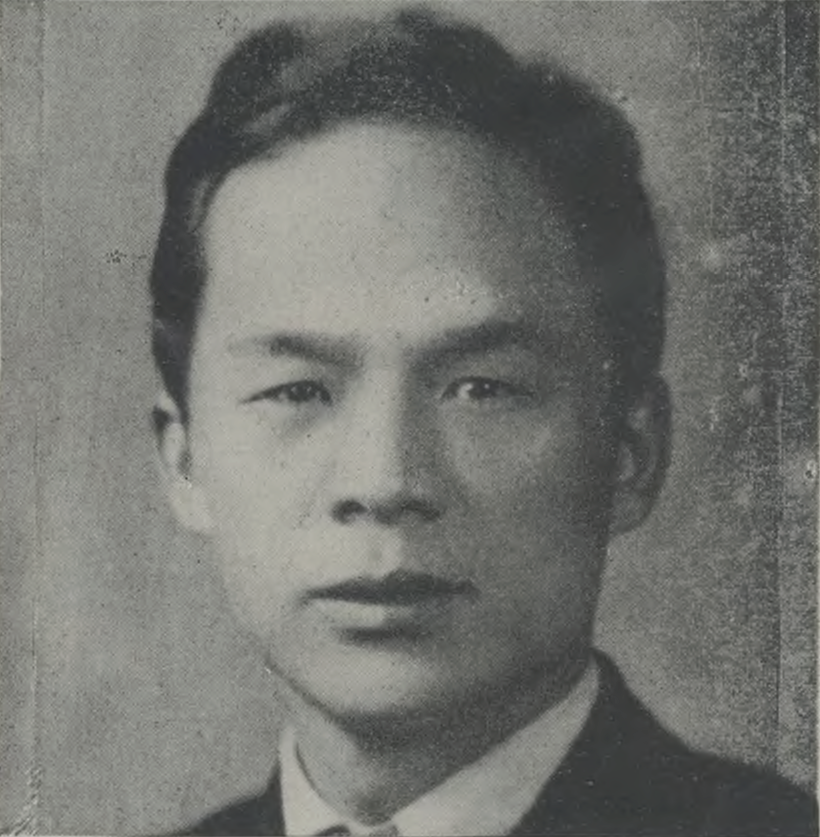
- Born: 28 February 1906
- Died: 25 July 1981 (aged 75); Tokyo, Japan
- Education: Yenching University
- Spouses: Tang Yufeng 唐玉凤 (m. 1925; div. 1932) Quan Huiwen 全慧文 (m. 1934; div. 1952) Eileen Chang 张爱玲 (m. 1944; div. 1947) She Aizhen 佘爱珍 (m. 1954; div. 1981)
- Children: Hu Qi 胡启; Hu Ningsheng 胡宁生; Hu Xiaoyun 胡小芸; Hu Jiyuan 胡纪元; Hu Xianzhi 胡先知; Hu Jinming 胡晋明(adopted)

Chinese name
- Traditional Chinese: 胡蘭成
- Simplified Chinese: 胡兰成
Transcriptions
Standard Mandarin
- Hanyu Pinyin: Hú Lánchéng
- Wade–Giles: Hu Lan-ch'eng

Hu Lancheng (Chinese: 胡蘭成; Feb 28, 1906 – July 25, 1981) was a Chinese writer and politician who was denounced as a traitor for serving a propaganda official in the Wang Jingwei regime, the Japanese puppet regime during the Second Sino-Japanese War. He was the first husband of the celebrated novelist Eileen Chang.

== Early life ==
Hu Lancheng (February 28, 1906 – July 25, 1981), also known as Zhang Jiayi 张嘉仪, was born in Zhejiang, China. Hu had six brothers, and he was the sixth child of Hu Xiumin (胡秀铭) and Wu Juhua (吴菊花).

In 1918, when Hu was twelve years old, he attended the entrance examination of Zhishan elementary school, in the summer of the same year, Hu enrolled in Secondary School Affiliated to Shaoxing No.5 Normal School. In 1919, Hu got into Shaoxing No.5 Secondary School. Hu studied for only one semester; the school closed down during the second semester due to boycott of classes.

In 1920, Hu went to Hangzhou with his cousin Wu Xuefan (吴雪帆), they both enrolled in Hangzhou Huilan Secondary School. He met many people during this time and made friends with Wang Jingzhi (汪静之), Liu Zhaoyang (刘朝阳), and Cui Zhenwu (崔真吾).

In 1923, Hu was eighteen years old and started his third year in Huilan Secondary School, he got engaged to Tang Yufeng (唐玉凤). When Hu was one semester short of earning his degree in Huilan Secondary School, Hu was expelled from school because he offended the registrar by editing the school newsletter. Two years later, in September 1925, Hu's father was found dead in his house and it was only one month after this event that Hu married Tang Yufeng, his first wife of five.

== Education ==
Hu grew up in the countryside where most people were uneducated, and although Hu was quite smart and good at learning, his original family was too poor to afford his education. Fortunately, he was well supported by his adoptive parents (义父) and finished his elementary education in Shaoxing.

In 1921, Hu entered the Wayland High School (蕙兰中学), a Christian School in Hangzhou. The school was famous for its English education, and many big-name writers such as Yu Dafu (郁达夫) and Lu Li (陆蠡) had also studied there. Throughout the four-year study in the Wayland School, Hu refused to go to church and spent most of the time reading. Apart from studying, Hu took an active part in developing social connections with many alumni, which later played an important role in his life.

Unlike Hu's poor hometown, Hangzhou was a city with enormous opportunities and new ideas that attracted many young people like Hu. During his stay in Hangzhou, Hu was connected with the Hupan Poets Club (湖畔诗社), which has made an important impact in the Chinese New Culture Movement and the history of modern Chinese poetry. By having access to education in Hangzhou, Hu was provided opportunities to develop his talent in literature, and therefore marked a turning point in his life.

== Marriages and affairs ==
Hu Lancheng was, and still is, recognized for his numerous lovers during the duration of his life. His first marriage, on the other hand, came to an end when his wife Tang Yufeng died, and two short marriages followed when he moved from Guangxi to Nanjing, respectively

For fans of Eileen Chang, also known colloquially as Zhangmi (張迷), Hu Lancheng's trysts are nothing short of notorious. Eileen Chang was his fourth wife out of five, a relationship that began through an affair while Hu was still married to his third wife. It is said that their attraction to one another was sparked through their impressive literary talent and Hu often spoke of Chang in high praise. Their marriage, similar to his past relationships, was riddled with affairs from beginning to end (1944–1946). His amorous affairs were only made worse by the fact he was largely financially dependent on Eileen Chang. According to his own memoir, Hu seduced a nurse named Zhou Xunde, who was just seventeen, shortly after marrying Chang. Moreover, near the end of their marriage, his affair with the widow Fan Xiumei, a member of the host family with whom he was staying, even led to a pregnancy.

Following his escape to Japan after World War II, Hu Lancheng married the widow of a Shanghai political collaborator, She Aizhen, but not before characteristically having a three-year affair with the wife of his then-landlord.

== Career ==
=== In China ===
Hu Lancheng began his career by working as a clerk in the University of Yen-ching, located in Beijing, which eventually exposed him to the western intellectual thought that inspired much of his writing and political beliefs, Marxism being one example. This was followed by a period of teaching positions at various high schools, this lasted about five years approximately. Hu Lancheng's acclaimed literary career began in Guangxi province in 1932 with the publishing of various essays in local in journals and newspapers. Under the employment of Wang Jingwei in the late 1930s, Hu's essays functioned as propaganda for the movement, most of which were featured in an organization devoted to the supporting Wang's ideals, such as the South China Daily. In 1938, Hu was the general editor of the South China Daily newspaper and simultaneously worked as an editor of the international relations sector of Weilan Shu Dian 蔚蓝书店 (Blue Bookstore). It has been said that the latter of the two provided him with the ability to critically analyze international relations, a topic which was continuously featured in his editorials. One of his most popular works from this era was the essay Zhannan he yi buyi (To seek battle is difficult; to seek peace is no less easy). Once Wang Jing-wei officially left the GMD (or Nationalist party), Hu Lancheng was promoted to the position of Deputy Minister of Propaganda within the party, and also worked for a time as Wang's secretary.

=== In Japan ===
In April 1950, Hu Lancheng managed to escape to Japan by cruise with the help of Xiong Jiandong (熊剑东) after staying in Hong Kong for five months. Having landed at Yokohama, Hu headed for Tokyo in search of help from his old friends, Tōzō Shimizu and Tomoki Ikeda, who later introduced him to the then socialites in Japan and helped broaden his social circle. In 1951, Hu settled down in Tokyo where he attended several political party meetings and composed articles to offer strategies for Japan in the Korean War. Even though the Taiwan government went against him for his being a traitor, Hu got to continue his work with the Japanese government at his back. When the Korean War was over, Hu started to lose his status as an “amateur politician.” Later in March 1954, Hu Lancheng married She Aizhen (佘爱珍) who came to Tokyo with Li Xiaobao (李小宝). In the following three to four years, Hu finished two of the most important books in his life: Shanhe suiyue (China through Time) and Jinsheng jinshi (This Life, This World), aiming to tap into the field of literature after his political failure in Japan. During his exile in Japan, Hu Lancheng kept in touch with mainland China, Hong Kong, and Taiwan with his friend Tang Chun-i (唐君毅) as the intermediary. They have written over 100 letters to each other and nearly one-third of them were written from 1950 to 1951.

=== In Taiwan ===
After Hu fled to Japan, a period of his life lasting approximately 20 years, he moved to Taiwan to teach in 1974. However, his career at the Chinese Culture Institute of Taiwan was short-lived. Other academics and intellectuals had exposed Hu as a collaborationist from the Sino-Japanese War via essays in public journals and newspapers, ultimately ending his time as a formal teacher in Taiwan. That being said, Hu continued to act as a mentor while in Taiwan, the Taiwanese writers and intellectuals Chu Tien-hsin and Chu Tien-wen being among his pupils. The latter of the two went on to write a memoir devoted to Hu, Huayi quanshen (Last life of a flower), as well as many other literary pieces. Some other examples of these works include ‘On Myths and Riddles’ and ‘On Confessions’.

== Politics ==
Wang's political engagement truly began in 1926, when he joined the Nationalist party in Nanjing. Although involved with the GMD, Hu Lancheng's political stance was largely inspired by the concept of xing, a term which can be simply explained as the fabrication of some force that stirs and encourages others. When applied to the makings of history, xing could be understood as the catalyst of revolution, and the belief that modern China was in desperate need of this was the foundation to Hu Lancheng's political stance. It was these values that could lead to Hu's controversial political values, including this quotation on his thoughts on human life in the making of a revolution, “Even if… [they] have killed millions of people, I won’t blink my eyes for a moment… it is the Way of heaven to kill the innocent.”

Revolution ... is the completion of humanity; it is its own end... We are fighting a war but we are not fighting for any goal. If one imposed a goal on it, the war would become something to put up with, rather than something to cheer for. I was dismayed when I first heard that one can willingly engage in a war that has no goal, but careful thinking has led me to realize the magnitude of its meaning.

— Hu Lancheng

Hu Lancheng did not begin as an ally to the Wang Jingwei regime, in fact, in 1943 he was sent to jail in Nanjing for publicly critiquing the puppet regime in his writings. Hu eventually agreed with Wang Jingwei and supported his campaign, it is as he says in his own words “It was a clear and peaceful day. All the mixed thoughts in my mind disappeared and I came to a crystal-clear attitude toward the vicissitudes of the world… I agreed to join the [Wang’s] campaign”. His time in the Wang regime was not marked without scandal, however, as he was caught publicly critiquing the collaborationist government and was once again jailed. It was at this point and time in his life that Hu began to strongly align himself with the Japanese for protection.

== List of major works ==
Works written in Chinese:

- 戰難和亦不易 Zhannan he yi buyi (To Seek Battle Is Difficult; to Seek Peace Is No Less Easy, 1938), Taipei: Yuanjing chubanshe, 2001. ISBN 9789573906728
- 山河歲月 Shanhe suiyue (China through Time, 1954), Taipei: Yuanjing chubanshe, 2003. ISBN 9789573900443
- 今生今世 Jinsheng jinshi (This Life, This World, 1959), Taipei: Yuanjing chubanshe, 2004. ISBN 9573907275
- 世界之轉機在中國 Shijie zhi zhuanji zai zhongguo (1962), Hong Kong: Xinwen tiandi she, 1963.
- 華學科學與哲學 Huaxue kexue yu zhexue (1975), Beijing: Zhongguo changan chubanshe, 2013. ISBN 9787510706424
- 禪是一枝花 Chan shi yizhihua (Zen Buddhism is a Flower, 1976), Beijing: Zhongguo changan chubanshe, 2013. ISBN 9787510706387
- 中國的禮樂風景 Zhongguo de liyue fengjing (1979), Taipei: Yuanliu chuban shiye gufen youxian gongsi, 1991. ISBN 9573210983
- 今日何日兮 Jinri heri xi (1980), Taipei: Yuanliu chuban shiye gufen youxian gongsi, 1990. ISBN 9579528330
- 中國文學史話 Zhongguo wenxue shihua (History of Chinese Literature, 1980), Beijing: Zhongguo changan chubanshe, 2013. ISBN 9787510706417
- 閒愁萬種 Xianchou wanzhong (A Thousand Kinds of Needless Misery, 1981), Taipei: Yuanliu chuban shiye gufen youxian gongsi, 1991. ISBN 9573213265

Works written in Japanese:

- 心經隨喜 Xinjing Suixi (1967), published in Chinese in 2013 by Zhongguo changan chubanshe. ISBN 9787510706394
- 建國新書 Jianguo Xinshu (1968), published in Chinese in 1991 by Yuanliu chuban shiye gufen youxian gongsi. ISBN 9789573213277
- 自然學 Ziran Xue (1972), 筑波: 梅田开拓筵, 1972.

== Literary analysis ==
Wang Xiangfu mentions that Hu Lancheng is skilled in his writings and is unique, however, his literature remains his only achievement in his whole life. Hu Lancheng had a hobby of writing literature. Two of his most well-known literary works, Shanhe suiyue (China Through Time, 1954) and Jinsheng jinshi are of high artistic value.

His memoir, Jinsheng jinshi (This Life, This World) paints a picture of his own life and he narrates it through a very natural way. Hu Lancheng approaches a fragmented style of writing, which is quite suitable for writing short fictional novels as it can jump from one point to another very quickly and frequently. Hu Lancheng gained fame through the fans of Eileen Chang. Some even admitted that it was because they loved Chang's literary works that they also appreciated Hu's writings. It was the act of loving one individual and extending that love towards their family (ai wu ji wu 爱屋及乌).

Hu Lancheng's writing could be hard to grasp at times and makes readers ponder for a better understanding. He also includes many surprises such as beginning his memoir in a unique way, and as a result throwing many people off, as they would never have guessed that to be the start of the book. As Wang Xiangfu describes, Hu Lancheng is a romantic, fengliu 风流, person and without doubt he is a talented scholar.

== Death and legacy ==
On July 25, 1981, Hu Lancheng died at age 75 due to chronic heart failure in Tokyo, Japan.

As for his legacy, Hu Lancheng “played a double role in the legend of Eileen Chang” as he was praised for his literary contributions but angered Chang's fans with his irresponsibility and betrayal. Hu was one of the “first few critics to appreciate” the talent of Eileen Chang's and praise her literary works. There was a mutual bond between Hu and Chang because “they mutually illuminated each other’s literary and intellectual paths”. Hu Lancheng “was a strong writer in his own right; as critics have observed, his style is so exquisite that it exerts an enchanting power over readers even to date.”

His life as a whole, on the other hand, has been succinctly summarized as such: “Caikexi, renyingfei 才可惜，人应废” (His talent should be cherished, he himself should be punished).

Although Hu Lancheng is known to be a Hanjian, a traitor, in the Chinese culture, he “never conceded to any charge of treason or infidelity against him. Instead, he eloquently defended his deeds in terms of intellectual necessity as well as effective imperative…Hu Lancheng still remains an infamous name in China.”.
