= List of Hong Kong films of 1972 =

This article provides a list of films produced in Hong Kong in 1972:

== 1972 ==
Title	Director	Cast	Genre	Notes
5 Fingers of Death (aka King Boxer)	Jeong Chang-hwa (Cheng Chang-ho)	Lo Lieh	Martial arts	
The 14 Amazons (Chinese: 十四女英豪)	Cheng Kang	Lisa Lu, Ivy Ling Po, Chen Yen-yen, Ouyang Sha-fei, Lily Ho, Li Ching, Betty Ting	Martial arts	
Action Tae Kwon Do	Yang Man Yi			
The Admarid Girl	Li Han Hsiang			
The Adventure	Lee Siu			
Angry Guest	Chang Cheh	David Chiang, Ti Lung, Yasuaki Kurata, Chan Sing, Cheng Li, Chang Cheh	Kung fu action drama	
The Avenger	Florence Yu Fung Chi			
Bandits From Shantung	Huang Feng	Chang Yi, Pai Ying, Hu Chin, Sammo Hung	Kung fu	
Battles With The Red Boy	Wu Chia Chun			
The Big Fight				
The Big Game				
The Black Enforcer	Ho Meng Hua			
Black List	John Law Ma			
The Black Tavern	Teddy Yip Wing Cho	Shih Szu, Ku Feng, Dean Shek, Tung Li, Wong Hap	Sword action	
Blind Boxer	Cheung Sam			
Blood Of The Leopard	Kim Lung	Yee Yuen, Kong Ban, Wang Tai Lang, Chan Hung Lit, Cheung Ching Ching	Kung fu action	
The Bloody Fight	Ng Tin Chi			
The Bloody Fists	Ng See Yuen	Siu Sing Chen and Chen Kuan Tai	Kung fu action	
The Boxer From Shantung	Chang Cheh, Pao Hsueh Lieh			
The Bride from Hell	Chou Hsu-Chiang	Margaret Hsing, Yang Fang, Carrie Ku Mei	Fantasy Ghost	
Bronze Head And Steel Arm	Gam Sing Yan			
The Brutal Boxer	Guan Shan			
The Cannibals	Kao Pao-shu			
The Casino	Tseng-Chai Chang	Lily Ho, Yueh Hua, Chin Feng	Drama, martial arts	
The Champion of Champions	Lee Ga			
Changing Love	Faan Daan			
Chaochow Guy	Gam Sing-Yan	Tien Han, Nancy Yen Nan-See, Wang Kuan Hsiung, Wong Fei-Lung	Kung Fu Action	
Cheating Panorama	Li Han Hsiang			
Chinese				
Chow Ken	Ting Shan-hsi			
Cold Wind Hands				
Crimes Are To Be Paid	Chow Yuk Kong			
Crush	Tu Guangqi	Chan Hung Lit, Steve Chen, Jason Pai		
The Dark Alley	Ng Woon			
The Death Duel	Chiang Ping Han			
The Decisive Battle				
Delightful Forest	Chang Cheh, Pao Hsueh Lieh			
Devil's Mirror	Sun Chung			
The Doomsday Machine	Harry Hope, Lee Sholem			
The Escape	Peter Yang Kwan, Florence Yu			
Ferocious Brothers	Chui Daai Gwan			
Finger of Doom	Pao Hsueh Lieh			
Fingers That Kill	Hui Kwok			
Fist of Fury	Lo Wei	Bruce Lee & Nora Miao		
The Fists Of Vengeance	Cheung Yat Woo			
Flower in the Rain	Gam Chue Yung			
Four Girls From Hong Kong	Lee Sun Fung	Chow Chung Miu Kam-Fung, Tang Wen, Che Yue, Cheng Chee-Liang, Willy Kong Tou, Lee Yuet-Ching, Leung Ming, Wang De-Jin, Siu-Fong Lai	Drama	
Four Riders	Chang Cheh			
The Fourteen Amazons	Ching Gong, Charles Tung			
The Fugitive	Cheung Chang Chak			
Furious Slaughter	Ting Shan-hsi	Jimmy Wang Yu, Sally Chen	Martial Arts, Kung Fu Action	
The Gallant				
The Ghost	Yuen Chau Fung			
The Ghostly Face	Yeung Sai Hing			
A Girl Fighter	Yeung Sai Hing			
The Gourd Fairy	Kuei Chih Hung			
Hapkido	Huang Feng			
The Hero	Wong Hung Chiang			
Hong Kong Criminal Crimes				
Huge Brother				
The Human Goddess	Ho Meng Hua			
The Hurricane	Lo Wei			
The Imperial Swordsman	Lam Fook Dei			
Impetuous Fire	John Law			
Intimate Confessions Of A Chinese Courtesan (Chinese: 愛奴)	Chor Yuen	Lily Ho, Betty Pei Ti, Yueh Hua	Adult Martial Arts	
Intrigue In Nylons	Kuei Chih Hung			
The Invasion	Suen Ga Man			
The Invincible	Law Chun			
Jenny And Her Sexy Mother	Cheung Sam			
The Killer (aka Sacred Knives of Vengeance)	Chor Yuen	Chin Han, Tsung Hua	Martial Arts	
King Boxer (aka 5 Fingers of Death)	Jeong Chang-hwa			
Lady Whirlwind	Huang Feng	Chang Yu, Angela Mao, Pai Ying, Oh Kyung-Ah, Liu Ah-Na, Chin Yuet-Sang, Sammo Hung	Martial Arts	
The Last Duel	Chui Chang Wang			
Legends Of Lust	Li Han Hsiang			
Let's Go to Bed				
Lion's Heart	Ting Shan-hsi			
The Lizard	Chu Yuan			
The Loner	Lee Sun Fung			
Love Affairs	Suen Ga Man			
Love And Blood	Ho Fan			
Love In A Cabin	Pai Ching Jui			
Ma Su Chen	Ting Shan-hsi	Nancy Yen Nan-See, Jimmy Wang Yu, Sally Chen	Martial Arts, Kung Fu Action	
Madness Of Love	Patrick Tse Yin			
A Man Beyond Horizon	Ng Tin Chi			
Man Of Iron	Chang Cheh, Pao Hsueh Lieh			
Many Faces Of A Diamond	Tu Guangqi			
Martial Hero	Griffin Yueh Feng			
The Merry Wife	Gam Chue Yung			
Il Mio nome è Shanghai Joe	Mario Caiano			
The Misguided Youth	Lui Kei			
The Naughty Couples	Cheung Sam			
The Notorious Ones				
Of Wives And Mistresses				
On The Waterfront	Hau Chang			
The Patriots	Evan Yang			
The Peeper, The Model And The Hypnotist	Cheung Sam			
Pei Shih 1972	Patrick Lung Kong			
Prodigal Boxer	Choi Yeung Ming			
Pursuit	Ching Gong			
A Resort Called Hell	Tong Wong			
Revenge Of The Iron Fist Maiden	Ng Fei Kim			
The Righteous Fist	Wong Hung Cheung			
The Roaring Lion	Ng Tin Chi			
Seaside Murder				
Shogun Saints	Kim Lung			
Showdown	Ting Shan-hsi			
Songs And Romance Forever	Luk Bong			
Sonny Come Home	Chik Yiu Cheong			
Stealing Love	Faan Daan			
Story Of Daisy				
Stranger In Hong Kong	Kuei Chih Hung, Lau Fong Gong			
Sword Of Heaven And Hell	Joe Law Chi			
Three Seventeens	Yam Yi Ji			
The Thunderbolt Fist	Cheung Yat Woo			
Tiger	Kim Lung			
Tiger Vs Dragon	Ng See Yuen			
Tough Duel	Hung Ting Miu			
Tough Guy	Joseph Kong Hung			
Treasure Castle	Han Ying Chieh			
Trilogy of Swordsmanship	Chang Cheh, Ching Gong, Griffin Yueh Feng			
The Warlord	Li Han Hsiang			
The Water Margin	Chang Cheh, Pao Hsueh Lieh, Wu Ma			
Way of the Dragon	Bruce Lee	Bruce Lee, Chuck Norris, Nora Miao, Robert Wall, Hwang In-Shik, Wei Ping-Ao	Martial arts	
Wild Horse	Faan Daan			
The Yellow Killer	Inoue Umetsugu			
The Yellow Muffler				
Young Avenger	Griffin Yueh Feng			
Young People	Chang Cheh			
