= Big Fight =

Big Fight may refer to:

- The Big Fight (1930 film), a 1930 film
- The Big Fight (1972 film), a 1972 Hong Kong film
- Asterix and the Big Fight, the seventh volume in the French comic book series, Asterix
  - Asterix and the Big Fight (film), a 1989 animated movie based on the seventh volume in the Asterix comic book series
- Big Fight Special, an episode from the first series of the BBC Comedy KYTV, originally shown in 1990
- The Big Fight Live, a British boxing television programme
- Kiseki no Big Fight, the closing theme song of the Dragon Ball Z film Kiken na Futari! Super Senshi wa Nemurenai
- Big Fight: Big Trouble in the Atlantic Ocean, a 1992 arcade game developed and published by Tatsumi
- "Is Usagi Going it Alone? The Sailor Warriors Get Into a Big Fight", a Sailor Moon episode
- The Tascosa Gunfight, an Old West gunfight that took place in Tascosa, Texas
