= Bloody Duel: Life and Death =

1972 Hong Kong film by Ng Tin Chi

The Bloody Fight
- DVD remastered cover
- Directed by: Ng Tin-tsu
- Produced by: Chiang Chung-Ping
- Starring: Pai Ying; Tang Ching; Alan Tang
- Cinematography: Lin Tsau
- Edited by: Yeung Pak-Wing
- Music by: Eddie Wang
- Production company: Guangming Film Company
- Release date: April 13, 1972
- Running time: 92 minutes
- Country: Hong Kong
- Languages: Mandarin; Thai

The Bloody Fight or Bloody Duel: Life And Death , released in France as La Vengeance du léopard is a 1972 Hong Kong action film directed by Ng Tin Chi.

== Cast ==
- Chen Kuan Tai
- Ingrid Hu
- Pawana Chanajit (as Liu Lan Ying)
- Alan Tang
- Pai Ying
- Eddie Ko Hung
- Goo Man Chung
- Fong Yau
- Tang Ching
- Chan Lau
