= Four Girls from Hong Kong =

1972 Hong Kong film by Lee Sun-fung

Four Girls From Hong Kong
- Chinese: 群芳譜
- Directed by: Lee Sun-fung
- Written by: Lee Siu-Hung
- Cinematography: Wan Kwai, Yu Sai-Hung
- Release date: 20 December 1972
- Country: Hong Kong
- Language: Mandarin

Four Girls From Hong Kong is a 1972 Hong Kong drama film directed by Lee Sun-fung.

== Overview ==
The film's Chinese title is 群芳譜. The film's alternative title is Kwan Fong Biu.

== Cast ==
- Chow Chung - Chang
- Miu Kam-Fung
- Tang Wen
- Che Yue - Tang Pei-Hua
- Cheng Chee-Liang
- Willy Kong Tou
- Yuet-ching Lee - Pei-Hua's mother
- Leung Ming - Pei-Hua's father
- Wang De-Jin - Blind father
- Siu-Fong Lai
