= Life Express =

Life Express may refer to:

- Life Express (2004 film), a Hong Kong-Taiwanese action drama film
- Life Express (2010 film), an Indian drama film
