= Yodchai Meksuwan =

- ยอดชาย เมฆสุวรรณ
- Yodchai Meksuwan in 1970s
- Born: Wichian Meksuwan; 25 June 1942; Thailand
- Died: 2 March 2025 (aged 82); Siriraj Piyamaharajkarun Hospital, Bangkok, Thailand
- Occupations: Film actor; sculptor
- Years active: 1970–2025
- Children: 3 sons, including Wongsamat "Nont" Meksuwan, Wanthanakom "Note" Meksuwan, Chomvichai "Noom" Meksuwan

Yodchai Meksuwan (Thai: ยอดชาย เมฆสุวรรณ; June 25, 1942 – March 2, 2025) was a Thai actor and sculptor whose acting career flourished during the 1970s, the golden age of Thai cinema.

== Biography ==
After graduating with a degree in business administration from the College of Commerce (now the University of the Thai Chamber of Commerce), he worked as a salesperson for Bata shoes. He entered the entertainment industry after being introduced by Sukon Kewlhiem, a famous comedian and actor, who encountered him while shopping at a Bata store in Siam Square.

He starred in the debut film Nam Jai Phor Kha in 1971, which was an immediate success and quickly established him as a popular actor. Unlike most of his male contemporaries, many of whom appeared primarily in action films, Yodchai often starred in dramas, frequently opposite actress Pawana Chanajit in playful, bickering romantic roles typical of romantic comedies and romance films. He also starred opposite another actress who came from a beauty pageant background, Supak Likhitkul. The two went on to appear together in several other films.

His acting credits include The 6 Ultra Brothers vs. the Monster Army (1974), a Japanese–Thai co-production in the kaiju genre. He played Dr. Wisut, a scientist who initially refuses to believe in the existence of Hanuman. He later appeared in Hanuman and the Five Riders (1975), in which he portrayed Dr. Ward. Yodchai other acting credits include The Legend of Suriyothai (2001), Fa Mai (2004), Death Happens (2009), Suea Sung Fah (2011), and its follow Suea Sung Fah II: Payak Payong (2013).

In addition to acting, he was also a sculptor, creating numerous sculptures and wax figures depicting various notable people. He eventually opened a museum featuring his works, housed in a mansion designed in the style of a European Renaissance-era estate. The museum is located at the western end of Borommaratchachonnani Road, heading toward Nakhon Pathom.

== Death ==
Yodchai Mekasuwan died peacefully from myocardial ischemia on March 2, 2025, at 9:39 p.m., at Siriraj Piyamaharajkarun Hospital, aged 82 years and 8 months. His cremation ceremony was held on June 8, 2025, at Wat Makutkasatthiyaram.
