= Chaochow Guy =

1972 Taiwanese-Hong Kong film by Tien Han

- Directed by: Tien Han
- Release date: 1972
- Countries: Taiwan; Hong Kong
- Language: Mandarin

Chaochow Guy is a 1972 martial arts film. A Taiwanese-Hong Kong co-production, it is directed by Tien Han and stars Tien Peng, Nancy Yen Nan-See, Wang Kuan Hsiung a.k.a. Wong Goon-Hung, Wong Fei-Lung, Lee Keung, Poon Chuen-Ling, Blackie Ko, Chan San-Yat, Ko Jan-Pang and Wong Hoi. This was also Wang Kuan Hsiung's first film.
