= The Dark Alley =

1972 Taiwanese-Hong Kong film by Ng Woon

- Directed by: Ng Woon
- Release date: 1972
- Countries: Taiwan; Hong Kong
- Language: Mandarin

The Dark Alley is a 1972 Taiwanese and Hong Kong film.
