= Wong Fei-lung =

Taiwanese actor and director

- Born: 22 January 1943 (age 82); Taiwan
- Occupation: Actor

Wong Fei-lung (born 22 January 1943) is a Taiwanese actor, director, and action director. With a career spanning over 150 films, he was a prominent face during the golden age of Hong Kong cinema. He has been alternatively credited as Wong Lung, Fei Lung, Nam Siu-Foo, and Huang Fei-Lung.

== Actor ==
In 1970 he had a part in the film Golden Sword and the Blind Swordswoman. In 1972 he appeared in Chaochow Guy with Tien Peng, Nancy Yen Nan-See and Wang Kuan Hsiung, and in Kung Fu Mama. In 1973 he appeared in The Flying Tiger a film that starred Sylvia Chang Ai-Chia, Wang Kuan Hsiung, Yasuaki Kurata and Tien Feng. In 1974 he had the role of Wong Chin Lau, the Police Intel. Chief in Iron Ox, The Tigers Killer with Wang Kuan Hsiung and Chi Laan. Since then he has acted in many films in the 1970s including the Bruceploitation films, Exit the Dragon, Enter the Tiger and Fists of Bruce Lee.

== Action Director and Director ==
As an action director he has directed the action of films such as The Champion of the Boxer 1972, Screaming Tiger 1973, Bruce Lee's Deadly Kung Fu 1976, The Eight Masters 1977 and Fists of Bruce Lee in 1978. He also was the director of Deadly Strike. In 1978 he directed a film that starred Bruce Li and Wong Wing-Sang.
