= Flying Over Grass =

1969 Hong Kong film by Lung Chien

- Cao shang fei
- Directed by: Lung Chien
- Written by: Tien-Yung Hsu; Hsin-Te Hung
- Starring: Ching-Ching Chang; Pin Chiang; Hsia Chiang
- Release date: 1969
- Country: Hong Kong
- Languages: Cantonese; Mandarin

Flying Over Grass
- Traditional Chinese: 草上飛
- Simplified Chinese: 草上飞
Transcriptions
Standard Mandarin
- Hanyu Pinyin: Cǎo shàng fēi

Flying Over Grass, (traditional Chinese: 草上飛; simplified Chinese: 草上飞), is a 1969 Hong Kong action martial arts film directed by Lung Chien, and starring Ching-Ching Chang, Pin Chiang, Hsia Chiang.

== Plot ==
In medieval China, a lone swordswoman called, for her incredible Kung-Fu prowess, "Flight over Grass", helps a group of people defeat a warlord.

== Cast ==
- Ching-Ching Chang
- Pin Chiang
- Hsia Chiang
- Li Chin
- Chiang Han
- Bao Hsiao
- You Hsiao
- Chun Huang
- You-Min Ko
