= Bruce Leung =

Hong Kong martial artist and actor (1951–2026)

- 梁小龍
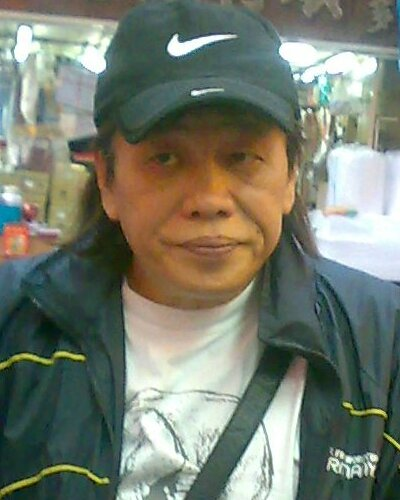
- Leung in 2007
- Born: Leung Choi-sang; 28 April 1948; British Hong Kong
- Died: 14 January 2026 (aged 77); Shenzhen, China
- Other name: Leung Siu-lung
- Occupations: Actor; martial artist
- Spouses: Irene Ryder (m. 1975; div. 1980) Song Xiang (m. 1995)
- Children: 3

Chinese name
- Traditional Chinese: 梁小龍
- Simplified Chinese: 梁小龙
Transcriptions
Standard Mandarin
- Hanyu Pinyin: Liáng Xiǎolóng
Yue: Cantonese
- Jyutping: Loeng^{4} Siu^{2} Lung^{4}

Leung Choi-sang
- Traditional Chinese: 梁財生
- Simplified Chinese: 梁财生
Transcriptions
Standard Mandarin
- Hanyu Pinyin: Liáng Cáishēng
Yue: Cantonese
- Jyutping: Loeng^{4} Coi^{4} Saang^{1}

Leung Choi-sang (Note: simplified Chinese: 梁财生; traditional Chinese: 梁財生; pinyin: Liáng Cáishēng; Jyutping: Loeng^{4} Coi^{4} Saang^{1}) (28 April 1948 – 14 January 2026), known professionally as Bruce Leung Siu-lung, (Note: simplified Chinese: 梁小龙; traditional Chinese: 梁小龍; pinyin: Liáng Xiǎolóng; Jyutping: Loeng^{4} Siu^{2} Lung^{4}) was a Hong Kong martial artist and actor who had appeared in many Hong Kong martial arts films.

Throughout his career, he often appeared billed as Bruce Leung, Bruce Liang, Bruce Leong, or Bruce Leung Siu-lung, and is thus generally grouped among the Bruce Lee clones that sprang up after Lee's death in the subgenre known as Bruceploitation.

== Background ==
Leung learned martial arts from his father at the Cantonese opera. While his major style is Goju ryu Karate, he also was a Wing Chun practitioner.

Throughout the 1970s and 1980s, he appeared in a large number of martial arts films. Most familiar to Western audiences may be Jim Kelly's The Tattoo Connection (in which he only appeared briefly, but choreographed the action sequences) and Jackie Chan's Magnificent Bodyguards, which was the first Hong Kong film shot in 3D. He is also known for playing Bruce Lee in the notorious Bruceploitation classic, The Dragon Lives Again.

In addition, Leung appeared in his own star vehicles, including My Kung-Fu 12 Kicks, Kung Fu: The Invisible Fist, and Black Belt Karate.

Leung retired from acting after 1988's Ghost Hospital. However, in 2004, he made a return to the screen as The Beast in Stephen Chow's Kung Fu Hustle (which, incidentally, was his first villainous role). In 2007, he appeared as himself in Italian documentary Dragonland directed by Lorenzo De Luca. The interview was made by night on the set of Shamo. He also appeared in a Chinese television series called Heroes which aired in 2020.

== Personal life and death ==
In 1975, Leung married Eurasian Hong Kong singer Irene Ryder and had a daughter. However, due to Leung's frequent travels to Mainland China for work, he was rarely in contact with Ryder and their daughter, resulting in their divorce in the 1980s.

In the summer of 1994, Leung's senior visited him in Shenzhen and introduced him to a 26-year old Northeast Chinese woman named Song Xiang (宋骧). Half a year later they would meet again, and Leung employed her as a floor manager of his Baolong Hotel. Leung and Song were married in 1995 at the hotel, and have a daughter and a son together. Their two children have practiced martial arts since they were very young.

Leung died in Shenzhen on 14 January 2026, after prolonged heart failure. He was 77.

== Filmography ==
Sources:

- The Invincible Eight (1971)
- The Yellow Killer (1972)
- Lady Kung Fu (1972)
- Kung Fu, the Invincible Fist (1972)
- Deep Thrust (1972)
- Rage of Wind (1973)
- Kung Fu Powerhouse (1973)
- Blade of Fury (1973)
- Call Me Dragon (1974)
- Hong Kong Godfather (1974)
- Little Superman (1975)
- The Fighting Dragon (1975)
- Hong Kong Superman (1975)
- The Return of the Condor Heroes (1976)
- The Legend of the Condor Heroes (1976)
- Bruce Against Iron Hand (1976)
- The Dragon Lives Again (1977)
- The Four Shaolin Challengers (1977)
- Broken Oath (1977)
- Magnificent Bodyguards (1978)
- The Tattoo Connection (1978)
- Ten Tigers of Shaolin (1979)
- The Fists, the Kicks and the Evil (1979)
- Black Belt Karate (1979)
- My Kung-Fu 12 Kicks (1979)
- Dragon Strikes (1979)
- The Fighter Dragon vs. Deadly Tiger (1980)
- Shaolin Kid (1980)
- Be the First (1980)
- The Legendary Fok (1981)
- Return of the Deadly Blade (1981)
- Gang Master (1982)
- Ruthless Revenge (1982)
- Showdown at the Equator (1984)
- The Eight Diagram Cudgel Fighter (1985)
- Rich and Famous 2 (1987)
- Vampires Live Again (1987)
- Ghost Hospital (1988)
- Kung Fu Hustle (2004)
- Shamo (2007)
- Kung Fu Fighter (2007)
- Sasori (2008)
- Kung Fu Chefs (2009)
- Jeet Kune Do (2010)
- Adventure of the King (2010)
- Gallants (2010)
- Just Another Pandora's Box (2010)
- Tiger and Dragon Reloaded (2010)
- The Kungfu Master (2012)
- Zombies Reborn (2012)
- Tai Chi Hero (2012)
- Tai Chi 0 (2012)
- Badges of Fury (2013)
- Princess and the Seven Kung Fu Masters (2013)
- Ip Man (2013)
- Hero of the River (2014)
- The Buddha's Shadow (2014)
- A Lifetime Treasure (2019)
- The Beast (2019)
- The Beast 2 (2019)
- Heroes (2020)
