= Magnificent Bodyguards =

1978 Hong Kong film by Lo Wei

- Theatrical poster
- Traditional Chinese: 飛渡捲雲山
- Simplified Chinese: 飞渡捲云山
- Hanyu Pinyin: Fēi Dù Juǎn Yún Shān
- Jyutping: Fei¹ Dou⁶ Gyun² Wan⁴ Saan¹
- Directed by: Lo Wei
- Screenplay by: Gu Long
- Produced by: Lo Wei
- Starring: Jackie Chan; James Tien; Leung Siu-lung
- Cinematography: Chen Yung-shu
- Edited by: Vincent Leung
- Music by: Frankie Chan
- Production company: Lo Wei Motion Picture Company
- Distributed by: 21st Century Distribution
- Release date: 27 April 1978
- Running time: 101 minutes
- Country: Hong Kong
- Language: Mandarin
- Box office: HK$775,522 (Hong Kong); 228,626 tickets (Seoul)

Magnificent Bodyguards is a 1978 Hong Kong martial arts film directed and produced by Lo Wei. The film stars Jackie Chan, James Tien, Leung Siu-lung, and Wang Ping. Chan, along with Luk Chuen also worked as stunt coordinators. This film was well received in Hong Kong, but Chan himself doesn't like it. He puts it down to Lo Wei not giving him any creative freedom. This was the first film in Hong Kong to be filmed using 3-D technology, and it features music from Star Wars.

== Plot ==
Lord Ting Chung is hired to escort a woman's sick brother to the doctor, but he does it for free. To get there they must pass through "Stormy Hills", an area of Ancient China controlled by criminals. Then the sick man turns out to be the king of the criminals and is not really sick; he is just trying to reclaim his throne from an imposter. The king had previously murdered Ting Chung's father, and now Ting Chung has to fight for his life to get out and also to avenge his father.

== Cast ==
- Jackie Chan as Lord Ting Chung
- James Tien as Tsang / Chang Wu-yi
- Leung Siu-lung as Chang
- Wang Ping as Lady Nan
- Lau Ming as Old Lady of Ma Por Inn
- Lee Man-tai as Bearded Shaolin Abbot
- Luk Chuen as King
- Fang Fang as Liu Chin-lien
- Ko Keung as Wen Liang-yu

== Home media ==
- The Japanese Laserdisc is said to be the only version containing the 3D version, though the only audio language option is Japanese and it is missing 10 minutes of footage.
- On 22 March 2002, Eastern Heroes released it on DVD cropped from 2.35:1 to 1.78:1 and an English dub (edited to remove Star Wars music) with no other language options.
- On 28 October 2005, Universal Japan released their DVD in 2.35:1. However, it has no English subtitles.
- On 5 March 2007, Hong Kong Legends released their DVD in 2.35:1 in Cantonese with newly translated English subtitles. However, the Cantonese "mono" is a downmix from the 5.1 remix. Mandarin is the correct language.
- In 2010, Fortune Star/Shout Factory released the film as part of the "Jackie Chan Eight Film Collection" DVD set. It is in 2.35:1, features the mono English dub, as well as the Star Wars music cues edited out of other versions.
- In 2026, 88 Films Presents 88 Asia Collection will release their Blu-ray in 2.35:1 in Mandarin with newly translated English subtitles. However, the Cantonese "mono" is a downmix from the 5.1 remix. This is the first 3D home release since the Japanese Laserdisc.

== See also ==
- Jackie Chan filmography
- List of Hong Kong films
