= Legends of Lust =

1972 Hong Kong film by Li Han-hsiang

Legends Of Lust
- Film poster
- Directed by: Li Han-hsiang
- Written by: Li Han-hsiang
- Produced by: Run Run Shaw
- Cinematography: Lin Chao; Nishimoto Tadashi
- Edited by: Chiang Hsing-Lung
- Music by: Chou Fu-Liang
- Production company: Shaw Brothers Studio
- Distributed by: Shaw Brothers Studio
- Release date: 16 November 1972 (Hong Kong)
- Running time: 100 minutes
- Country: Hong Kong
- Language: Mandarin

Legends of Lust (Chinese: 風月奇譚; pinyin: Feng yue qi tan) is a 1972 Hong Kong adult comedy film.
