= The Bridge at Lo-Yang =

1975 Hong Kong film by Lung Chien

- Release poster
- 洛陽橋 神魔斗法
- Directed by: Tang Long
- Written by: Lung Chien
- Starring: Barry Chan; Lu-Ling Li
- Release date: 1975
- Running time: 89 minutes
- Countries: Hong Kong, Taiwan
- Languages: Cantonese; Mandarin

The Bridge at Lo-Yang
- Traditional Chinese: 洛陽橋
Transcriptions

The Bridge at Lo-Yang, (Chinese: 洛陽橋; pinyin: Luòyáng qiáo, also titled Chinese: 神魔斗法; pinyin: Shén mó dòufǎ; lit. 'Battle Between Gods and Demons'), is a 1975 Taiwanese-Hong Kong action fantasy film directed by Tang Long, written by Lung Chien, and starring Barry Chan and Lu-Ling Li.

== Synopsis ==
During the reign of Emperor Renzong of Song, a large river flowed through Quanzhou. The two banks were about two miles apart, so the residents of Quanzhou relied on ferries for daily transportation. However, the river's currents were extremely treacherous, and countless people drowned each year. Legend had it that a turtle and a snake, two demons, were tormenting the river. To ensure the people's safety, Emperor Renzong dispatched Cai Xiang, a top scholar, to Quanzhou to oversee the construction of a bridge. Cai was a filial son; his mother had vowed that if her son achieved the highest honors in the imperial examinations, he would build a bridge in Luoyang. Despite working for the country and out of filial piety for over five years, Cai's efforts to build the bridge yielded no results, instead causing financial losses and hardship for the people. He worried about the treacherous nature of the Luoyang River. Cai thought that if Heaven were to help him, building the bridge would be much simpler…

== Cast ==
- Barry Chan
- Lu-Ling Li
- Erh Liang
- Ming Liu
- Lu-Sha Chen
- Pi Chen
- Yun Fei
- Ah-San Ge
