= Battles with the Red Boy =

1972 Taiwanese-Hong Kong film by Wu Chia Chun

Battles With The Red Boy
- Directed by: Wu Chia Chun
- Release date: 1972
- Countries: Taiwan, Hong Kong
- Language: Mandarin

Battles With The Red Boy is a 1972 Taiwanese Hong Kong film.
