= The Orphan (1960 film) =

1960 Hong Kong film by Lee Sun-fung

- The Orphan, 1960 film
- Traditional Chinese: 人海孤鴻
- Simplified Chinese: 人海孤鸿
- Hanyu Pinyin: Rén Hǎi Gū Hóng
- Jyutping: Jan4 Hoi2 Gu1 Hung4
- Directed by: Lee Sun-fung
- Screenplay by: Ng Cho-fan
- Story by: Au-yeung Tin
- Produced by: Ng Cho-fan
- Starring: Bruce Lee, Ng Cho-fan, Yin Pak, Fung Fung, Yuet-ching Lee
- Cinematography: Suen Lun; Yuen Chang-sam
- Edited by: Kwok Keung
- Music by: Lam Sing-yap
- Production company: Hualien Films
- Release date: 3 March 1960
- Running time: 104 minutes
- Country: Hong Kong
- Language: Cantonese

The Orphan is a 1960 Hong Kong drama film directed by Lee Sun-fung and starring Bruce Lee. The film is based on the novel of the same Chinese title by Au-yeung Tin. The Orphan was filmed in the early months of 1959, and Bruce Lee's last Hong Kong film before he returned to the United States in April 1959. The film was ranked number 52 of the Best 100 Chinese Motion Pictures at the 24th Hong Kong Film Awards.

== Plot ==
During the outbreak of the Sino-Japanese War, Ho See-kei lost his wife Lan and his daughter while also being separated from his son To and his maid Sister Five. After the war, Ho became the headmaster of an orphanage and foils orphan Sam's plan to rob rich man, Cheung Kat-cheung, and widow Yiu So-fung. Ho persuades Sam to rehabilitate and returns the things that he had stolen. Ho invites Fung to teach at the orphanage while also successfully persuading Sam to enter school.

One night, Sam misses his family and quietly leaves to see the Cheung family's maid Sister Five. Fung mistakenly thought he was joining the gang and scolds him. Sam was displeased at Fung and plays a trick on her, which leads to punishment from Ho. Triad leader Kwo-kong Lung takes the chance to threaten Sam to kidnap Cheung's son Sing. Ho goes to Cheung's house to understand the situation and discovers that Sister Five was his maid before the war, while also discovers that Sam is his son. Sam fails to save Sing and got his ear cut off by Lung. He then struggles to return to the orphanage where he acquaints with his father Ho and he repents and leads to police to rescue Sing.

== Cast ==
- Bruce Lee as Sam
- Ng Cho-fan as Headmaster Ho See-kei
- Yin Pak as Teacher Yiu So-fung
- Fung Fung as Big Brother Kwo-kong Lung
- Yuet-ching Lee as Sister Five
- Lee Pang-fei as Cheung Kat-cheung
- Lee Siu-hung as Ming
- Ko Lo-chuen as adviser
- Ng Tung as informant
- Lam Lo-ngok as Lo Yee
- Fung Wai-man as Mrs. Cheung
- Yeung Kong as teacher
- Chung Wai-man as teacher
- Chan Wai-yue as Lan
- Cheng Kam Hon as Ha
- Leung Chun-mat as Sing
- Wong Hon as beggar
- Cheung Chi-suen as detective
- Ko Chiu as police officer

== See also ==
- Bruce Lee filmography
