= Gold Snatchers =

1973 Hong Kong film by Lung Chien

- 虎拳
- Directed by: Lung Chien
- Written by: Hsiang-Kan Chu
- Starring: Sing Chen; Yasuaki Kurata
- Release date: 1973
- Running time: 92 minutes
- Country: Hong Kong
- Languages: Cantonese; Mandarin

Gold Snatchers, (Chinese: 虎拳; pinyin: Hǔ quán; Wade–Giles: Hu^{3} tsüen^{2}; Jyutping: Fu^{2} kyun^{4}), is a 1973 Hong Kong action martial arts film directed by Lung Chien and starring Yasuaki Kurata.

== Plot ==
Chen Sing and Ah Fat come out of jail and go to Chen's stepmother's grave to find a chest of gold to steal. Chan searches for the gold the Delinquents have stolen, only to later discover that he was framed by his half-brother Lung Fei.

== Cast ==
- Sing Chen
- Yasuaki Kurata
- Shen-Lin Chen
- Ying Fung Chen
- Ming Chin
- Ming-Shao Ho
- Wei-Hsiung Ho
- Blackie Shou-Liang Ko
