= The 6 Ultra Brothers vs. the Monster Army =

1974 film directed by Shohei Tōjō

- Japanese theatrical release poster
- Directed by: Sompote Sands; Shohei Tōjō
- Written by: Bunzo Wakatsuki; P. Piml
- Produced by: Sompote Sands; Noboru Tsuburaya; Hisao Itō
- Starring: Yodchai Meksuwan; Pawana Chanajit
- Cinematography: Toshiyuki Machida
- Edited by: Yoshihiro Yanagawa (Japanese version)
- Music by: Toru Fuyuki; Masanobu Higurashi; Boonyong Ketkong; Sompot Lamphong
- Production companies: Chaiyo Productions; Tsuburaya Productions
- Distributed by: Fuji Eiga (Japan); Chaiyo Productions (Thailand)
- Release dates: March 17, 1979 (Japan); November 26, 1974 (Thailand)
- Running time: 80 minutes (Japan); 103 minutes (Thailand)
- Country: Thailand
- Languages: Thai; Japanese
- Budget: $120,000
- Box office: $202,354

The 6 Ultra Brothers vs. the Monster Army (Japanese: ウルトラ6兄弟VS怪獣軍団, Hepburn: Urutora Roku Kyōdai tai Kaijū Gundan), known in Thailand as Hanuman Meets the 7 Supermen (หนุมาน พบ 7 ยอดมนุษย์ – Hanuman pob Jed Yodmanud), is a Thai tokusatsu superhero kaiju film produced in 1974 by Chaiyo Productions of Thailand under the supervision of Tsuburaya Productions of Japan. It was released theatrically in Thailand on November 26, 1974, and in Japan on March 17, 1979.

== Plot ==
The sun is gradually moving towards the Earth, causing massive heat waves, birds to fall from the sky, and a lack of rain. A group of children perform a rain dance, believing that the gods will solve the problem, while Dr. Wisut, a scientist at a nearby missile site, plans to launch rockets that will conduct a weather modification experiment. His assistant Marissa, however, still believes that they should also ask the gods for rain.

Three robbers break into the temple where the children are dancing and take priceless artifacts. The robbers beat up a boy named Koh when he tries to step in, but when he gets up and climbs into their jeep, he is shot in the face and killed. Fortunately, the Mother of Ultra, witnessing the incident from Nebula M78, revives the child, believing his death to be unfair. She quickly summon the legendary deity Hanuman to take over his body.

Hanuman flies away to enact revenge on the robbers who killed Koh. Koh's friend Anan attempts to follow him, collapsing due to the intense heat, and dreaming about the Phra Lak Phra Ram story featuring Hanuman. Hanuman then successfully persuades the Sun to move back to its original location, and revives Anan.

Meanwhile, Dr. Wisut's experiment begins, launching the first rocket. Although it is successful, he ignores a problem that Marissa tells him headquarters have found, which causes the second rocket to explode on its launchpad. This causes a chain reaction that destroys the others at the test site in a massive detonation. The explosion creates an earthquake which in turn causes a fissure to form in the ground, from which emerge five kaijus. They are Gomora (from Ultraman), Dustpan (originally from Mirrorman, being the only kaiju out of the set to not originate in a main Ultra Series entry), Astromons, Tyrant and Dorobon (all from Ultraman Taro).

Marissa finds her younger brother Anan, who forces her to help him search for Koh. The latter transforms into Hanuman to fight the kaijus. Gomora chases Marissa and Anan, causing Marissa to injure her leg. Meanwhile, Hanuman is overpowered by the other kaijus, but the Ultra Brothers arrive on Earth to help him. Dr. Wisut dies when his laboratory is engulfed in the explosion of its fuel tanks. Eventually, the seven heroes triumph over the kaijus, and all return home.

== Production ==
Sompote Sands had studied the filming of King Kong vs. Godzilla in 1962, and had founded his own studio, Chaiyo Productions, in 1973 to make similar films. Eiji Tsuburaya, King Kong vs. Godzilla’s special effects director, died on January 25, 1970, leaving his company Tsuburaya Productions in a debt of $500,000. To pay it off, his son Noboru Tsuburaya asked Sands to coproduce a film with him, leading to both The 6 Ultra Brothers vs. The Monster Army and Jumborg Ace and Giant, the latter released earlier in 1974.

== Release and reception ==
The 6 Ultra Brothers vs. The Monster Army was released in Thailand on November 26, 1974, at the end of the school holidays. It was only shown at the Sala Chalermkrung Royal Theatre for the first two days of release, with a statue of Hanuman placed outside, grossing over three hundred thousand Thai baht during this period. Within seven days, that number had increased to one million, and eventually ended its run at $202,354.

The film won an award honouring Asian culture at the Asia Film Festival in Jakarta, Indonesia, however it was criticised by Rangsarit Chaosiri, Director-General of the Fine Arts Department, saying that it was inappropriate to cross Hindu deity Hanuman with the Japanese superhero Ultraman. On October 4th 2012, Thai Film Preservation Day, the National Film Heritage Registry selected it as one of twenty-five titles to be named national heritage.

=== International versions ===
Following the film's success in Thailand, Run Run Shaw, the founder of Shaw Brothers, personally visited Sompote Sands to negotiate a deal to release it in East Asia. A Mandarin dub was commissioned and the film was edited on its original negative, with the cut scenes added back at a later date, as proven by tape splices on the full length version that correspond to the export version's cuts. The film was released in Hong Kong on February 26, 1975, and in Taiwan on June 27. An English dub based on this version was recorded by the Hong Kong-based dubbing group Axis International and released in Lebanon. Taiwanese posters note that the film was also released in 70mm.

Although the film's Japanese release was initially undecided, in 1979, the Ultra Series received a boost in popularity, leading to the film being dubbed into Japanese and released together with Akio Jissoji’s Ultraman. A new opening theme, Bokura no Ultraman was recorded by Isao Sasaki.

=== Hanuman Meets the 11 Supermen and Space Warriors 2000 ===
In 1984, The 6 Ultra Brothers vs. The Monster Army was rereleased in Thailand as Hanuman Meets the 11 Supermen (หนุมาน พบ 11 ยอดมนุษย์ - Hanuman pob Sibed Yodmanud), a re-edit that adds footage from the Japanese compilation film Ultraman Zoffy: Ultra Warriors vs. the Giant Monster Army, also released in 1984, throughout the first half of the film. The film notably adds voices to many fight scenes. The following year the film was broadcast as a TV movie in the United States as Space Warriors 2000, although it was entirely filmed in Belgravia, London with an all-British cast, including Bob Sessions. The story revolved around a boy named Nicholas who is given an Ultraman action figure that comes to life. He takes Nick to aid in the Space Warriors’ (the Ultramen's) quest against evil. The film is particularly infamous for its humorous dialog and the renaming of several characters, such as "Mr. Bad" (Red King) and "Lobster Man" (Alien Baltan). On December 14, 2012, Sompote Sands gifted the copyright to Hanuman Meets the 11 Supermen to the Ministry of Culture.

=== Home video releases ===
In 1986, the film was released on VHS and LaserDisc in Japan by Nippon Columbia. In 2001, the film was released on DVD and VCD in Thailand, albeit via a new redub. It was re-released in 2008 by TIGA Entertainment with its original audio. In 2016, Zeno Pictures released the original 1974 Thai cut on DVD in Belgium and France.

== Cast ==
Character	Actor	English Export Dub	Japanese Dub
Hanuman	Yupon Thammasri (voice)	Ted Thomas	Issei Futamata
Koh	Sanit Kaewadee	Lynne Wilson	Ai Sasaki
Anan	Ouab Somchat	Unknown	Sumiko Shirakawa
Dr. Wisut	Yodchai Meksuwan	Chris Hilton	Takashi Nakagi
Marissa	Pawana Chanajit	Lynne Wilson	Yoko Kuri
Sripouk	Himself	Ted Thomas	Junpei Takiguchi
Srisuriya	Himself	Warren Rooke	Shingo Kanemoto
Robber	Kaan Boonchoo	Ted Thomas	Tetsu Shiratori
Robber	Jan Wanpen	Chris Hilton	Tetsuo Mizutori
Robber	Prida Somthobsuuk	Warren Rooke	Shigeo Hashimoto
Flower of Life	Unknown	Unknown	Taeko Uesaka
Ultraman	Kinichi Kusumi	Warren Rooke	Toshio Furukawa

=== Space Warriors 2000 ===
- Bob Sessions as Nick's father
- Nicholas Curror as Nick
- Sarah Taunton as Nick's Mother
- Wendy Danvers as Edmund's Wife, voice of Nick, Ultra Mother
- Marc Smith as Ultraman, Andar, Danlar, Rayow, Batcar, Meanest Monster in Monster Land, Ragon, Mr. Bad, Gomora, Lobster Men, Flabber Gabber, Geronimon, Gango, Robbers, Astromons, Dorobon, Hanuman (Note: Some characters are unnamed, and so are referred to by their Japanese names. Some of the given names inconsistently change bearers, and some voices are pitch-shifted.)
