= Fingers That Kill =

1972 Hong Kong film by Hui Kwok

the Fist That Kills
- Directed by: Hui Kwok
- Written by: Ni Kuang
- Produced by: Yang Man Yi
- Release date: 1972
- Country: Hong Kong
- Language: Mandarin

Fingers That Kill (Tie zhi tang shou) is a 1972 Hong Kong film directed by Hui Kwok.

== Cast ==
- Thompson Kao Kang
- Tony Liu Jun Guk
- Jason Pai Piao
- Chan Lau
- Ang Saan
- Tong Kwok Si
- Ma Chung Tak
- Lau Hok Nin
