= Death Happens =

2009 Thai language horror film

Death Happens (Thai: 6:66 Dtaai Mai Daai Dtaai) is a 2009 Thai language horror film. It was directed by Taklaew Rueangrat and stars actors Susira Angelina Naenna, Jason Young, and Yodchai Meksuwan. It was released in Thailand on 30 July 2009.
