= Ferocious Brothers =

1972 Hong Kong film by Chui Daai Gwan

- Directed by: Chui Daai Gwan
- Release date: 1972
- Country: Hong Kong
- Language: Mandarin

Ferocious Brothers is a 1972 Hong Kong film.
