= Crimes Are To Be Paid =

1972 Taiwanese-Hong Kong film by Chow Yuk Kong

- Directed by: Chow Yuk Kong
- Release date: 1972
- Countries: Taiwan; Hong Kong
- Language: Mandarin

Crimes Are To Be Paid is a 1972 Taiwanese and Hong Kong film.

== Cast ==
- O Chun Hung
- Tien Feng
- Tien Ni
- Wang Lai
- Chan Chun
- Maang Lee
- Zhu Mu
- Kong Ban
- Wong Chung Shun
