= Curry and Pepper =

1990 Hong Kong film by Blackie Ko

- Golden Collection DVD cover
- Traditional Chinese: 咖喱辣椒
- Simplified Chinese: 咖喱辣椒
- Hanyu Pinyin: Gālí Làjiāo
- Jyutping: Gaa3 Lei1 Laat6 Ziu1
- Directed by: Blackie Ko
- Written by: James Yuen
- Produced by: Peter Chan
- Starring: Jacky Cheung; Stephen Chow; Ann Bridgewater; Eric Tsang
- Cinematography: Andrew Lau
- Edited by: Chan Kei-hop
- Music by: Richard Lo
- Production company: Movie Impact
- Distributed by: Newport Entertainment
- Release date: 24 May 1990
- Running time: 96 minutes
- Country: Hong Kong
- Language: Cantonese
- Box office: HK$15,777,856

Curry and Pepper is a 1990 Hong Kong action comedy film directed by Blackie Ko and starring Jacky Cheung and Stephen Chow. This film is Cheung and Chow's second film collaboration after the 1988 film, Faithfully Yours.

== Plot ==
Curry and Pepper are two CID detectives who do not take their jobs seriously. When newspaper reporter Joey Law decides to film a documentary about daily police life, she chooses to film Curry and Pepper. As Curry and Pepper fight for Joey's affection, their friendship is seriously jeopardised. Eventually, the two reconcile and work together to take down a vicious hit man named Abalone. Later, they are dealing against North Korea Communists and kill them all for entering Hong Kong for with no permission.

== Cast ==
Name	Role
Jacky Cheung	as Curry (Wong Ka-lei)
Stephen Chow	as Pepper (Chiu Man-keung)
Blackie Ko	as Abalone
John Shum	as Chin Wontons
Barry Wong	as Chief Inspector Chow
Fruit Chan	as Kuo
Eric Tsang	as Ten
Ann Bridgewater	as Joey Law
Chow Mei-yan	as Anna
Michael Dinga	as Chief Inspector Ma
Billy Ching	as Dog
Fung Yuen-chi	as General
Lau Yuk-kei	as General's killer
Szeto Chi-keung	as General's killer
Garry Chan	as Druggy Ma Chen
Cheung Ying-wah	as Drug Addict Chuen
Yeung Wan-king	as Bearded burglar

== Box office ==
This film grossed HK$15,777,856 in its theatrical run in Hong Kong from 24 May to 29 June 1990.
