= The Darkest Sword =

1970 Hong Kong film by Lung Chien

- Hei jian gui jing tian
- Directed by: Lung Chien
- Written by: Ge Tien
- Produced by: Yuan Hsiang Wu
- Starring: Ching-Ching Chang; Pin Chiang
- Music by: Eddie Wang
- Release date: 1970
- Running time: 97 minutes
- Country: Taiwan
- Language: Mandarin

The Darkest Sword, also known as Hei jian gui jing tian (Chinese: 黑劍鬼驚天), is a 1970 Taiwanese martial arts film directed by Lung Chien, produced by Yuan Hsiang Wu, and starring Ching-Ching Chang and Pin Chiang.

== Plot ==
Tun-Shan is grieved because he unintentionally killed an enemy and doesn't want to fight anymore. Then, he destroys his sword. Meanwhile, Su-Chen, in love with him, convinces him to start fighting again.

== Cast ==
- Ching-Ching Chang
- Pin Chiang
- Yuan Yi
- Ming-Ming Hsiao
- Min-Hsiung Wu
