= Chang Hsiao-yen =

Taiwanese television host and actress

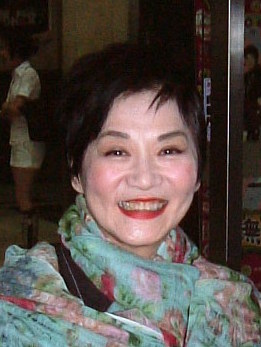
- Born: 11 August 1948 (age 78); Shanghai, China
- Education: Blessed Imelda's School
- Occupations: Host; actress; businesswoman; radio DJ
- Years active: 1953–present
- Spouses: Pei Chen-kun (m. 1980; div. 1986); Peng Kuo-Hua (m. 1990; died 2001)
- Children: 1

Chinese name
- Traditional Chinese: 張小燕
- Simplified Chinese: 张小燕
Transcriptions
Standard Mandarin
- Hanyu Pinyin: Zhāng Xiǎoyàn
- Musical career
- Also known as: Zhang Xiaoyan

Chang Hsiao-yen (simplified Chinese: 张小燕; traditional Chinese: 張小燕; pinyin: Zhāng Xiǎoyàn); born 11 August 1948) is a Taiwanese television host and actress. Born in Shanghai, Chang relocated to Taiwan amid the Chinese Civil War and started her career at the age of five as a child actor. In 1958, she received her first Best Child Actress award at the Asia Pacific Film Festival, a recognition she would earn for three consecutive years. In the 1980s, Chang gained wide popularity for hosting the CTS variety show Variety 100 (綜藝100). She is also known for hosting television shows such as Weekend Pie (週末派), Super Sunday (超級星期天), Million-Dollar Class (百萬小學堂) and SS Hsiao-yen Night (SS小燕之夜). She is a mentor of television hosts Mickey Huang, Pu Hsueh-liang and Bowie Tsang.

A grande dame of Taiwanese entertainment industry, Chang co-managed music label UFO Records, where she launched the career of Xiao Hu Dui, and later co-founded Forward Music (豐華唱片) with Peng Kuo-hua, launching the careers of A-mei and Tao Ching-Ying. From the 1990s to 2010s, Chang served in executive management roles at TVBS Entertainment Channel, Azio TV, Grand Pan Communication Co., and UFO Network Broadcasting. She has largely retired since 2020.

== See also ==
- Knight of the Sword
