= The Death Duel =

1972 Taiwanese-Hong Kong film by Chiang Ping Han

- Directed by: Chiang Ping Han
- Release date: 1972
- Countries: Taiwan, Hong Kong
- Language: Mandarin

The Death Duel is a 1972 Taiwanese and Hong Kong film about the Ching Wu Association and the Japanese-rule era.
