= Knight of the Sword =

1969 Hong Kong film by Lung Chien

- 南刀北劍; Nan Dao Bei Jian
- Directed by: Lung Chien
- Written by: Ge Tien
- Starring: Yeh Tien; Hsiao Yen Chang; Yu-Hua Ho
- Release date: 1969
- Running time: 90 minutes
- Country: Hong Kong
- Languages: Cantonese; Mandarin

Knight of the Sword
- Traditional Chinese: 南刀北劍
Transcriptions
Standard Mandarin
- Hanyu Pinyin: Nan Dao Bei Jian

Knight of the Sword, (Chinese: Nan Dao Bei Jian), is a 1969 Hong Kong action martial arts film directed by Lung Chien, and starring Yeh Tien, Hsiao Yen Chang, Yu-Hua Ho.

== Cast ==
- Yeh Tien
- Chang Hsiao-yen
- Yu-Hua Ho
- Chun Huang
- Wei Ou
- Yueh Sun
- Lin Tung
