= Blind Boxer =

1972 Hong Kong film by Cheung Sum

- French-language poster of the film
- Directed by: Cheung Sum
- Written by: Ni Kuang
- Starring: Lee Chen Lee; Ingrid Hu Yin-Yin; Jason Pai Piao
- Release date: 1972
- Country: Hong Kong
- Language: Mandarin

Blind Boxer (Chinese: 盲拳, Pinyin: Máng quán) is a 1972 Hong Kong kung fu film. The film is also called Blind Fists.

== Plot ==
Fong Man is a member of a Chinese boxing school run by his blind instructor. The students are often distracted by national televised fights, and are particularly enamored by the current champion, "Gorilla".
