= The Bride from Hell =

1972 Hong Kong film by Chou Hsu-chiang

- Chinese: 鬼新娘
- Directed by: Chou Hsu-Chiang
- Written by: Tyrone Hsu Tien-Yung
- Produced by: Runme Shaw
- Cinematography: Hsu Te-Li
- Distributed by: Shaw Brothers
- Release date: March 24, 1972
- Country: Hong Kong
- Language: Mandarin

The Bride from Hell is a 1972 Hong Kong horror film directed by Chou Hsu-Chiang and produced by the Shaw Brothers studio.

== Plot ==
Yunpeng (Yang Fan) and his servant stay at a country inn one dark evening to escape potential robbers and ghosts. But Yunpeng chances into something far more dangerous when he accidentally happens upon the comely Anu (Xing Hui) naked in bed. To atone for his rudeness, he has to marry her. Because of her beauty, the request is not too difficult to fulfill...until she is introduced to his aunts and uncles, who notice her ghastly green glow and deduce that she's a spirit from the netherworld. But there's something even darker about her appearance, and it may be revenge on his in-laws.

== Cast ==
- Margaret Hsing - Anu / Feng Ai Jiao
- Yang Fang - Nie Yun Peng
- Lui Ming - Master Jin Lu Shan
- Carrie Ku Mei - Jing Gu
- Ko Hsiao-Pao - Da Huo Zi (Peng's servant)
- Chang Feng - Master Tai Yi
