= Kung Fu Powerhouse =

1973 Hong Kong film by Lung Chien

- Si dui tou
- Directed by: Lung Chien
- Written by: Hsiang-Kan Chu
- Starring: Kang Chin; Yasuaki Kurata; Blackie Shou-Liang Ko
- Cinematography: Ching-Yun Hung
- Music by: Liang Chou
- Release date: 1973
- Running time: 90 minutes
- Country: Hong Kong
- Languages: Cantonese; Mandarin

Kung Fu Powerhouse
- Simplified Chinese: 死對頭
Transcriptions
Standard Mandarin
- Hanyu Pinyin: Si dui tou

Kung Fu Powerhouse, (also titled One by One Chinese: Si dui tou), is a 1973 Hong Kong action martial arts film directed by Lung Chien, and starring Yasuaki Kurata.

== Plot ==
Kuo Fu, a ruthless drug trafficker, escapes forced labor. The problem for him is that another prisoner insists on following him even after he escapes. Kuo suspects that his unwanted friend is a cop under an assumed name.

== Cast ==
- Kang Chin
- Yasuaki Kurata
- Blackie Shou-Liang Ko
- Ka Ting Lee
- Leung Siu-lung
