= Angry Guest =

1972 Hong Kong film by Chang Cheh

- Film poster
- Directed by: Chang Cheh
- Written by: Ni Kuang
- Produced by: Sir Run Run Shaw
- Starring: David Chiang; Ti Lung; Ching Li; Yasuaki Kurata
- Cinematography: Kung Mu-To
- Edited by: Kwok Ting-Hung
- Music by: Frankie Chan
- Distributed by: Shaw Brothers Studio
- Release date: 26 February 1972 (Hong Kong)
- Running time: 90 minutes
- Country: Hong Kong
- Language: Mandarin

Angry Guest or E ke is a 1972 Shaw Brothers film directed by Chang Cheh from Hong Kong, starring David Chiang and Ti Lung. It is a sequel to Cheh's Duel of Fists (1971). Godfrey Ho served as assistant director (credited as Chih Chiang Ho).

== Plot ==
In Thailand, an architect and his brother capture a gangster wanted by the authorities, a ruthless man named Killer. However, he escapes from prison and seeks revenge by killing his brother's family and holding his girlfriend hostage in Japan. Although they catch up with him, they are blackmailed into letting Killer free, the girlfriend will be killed. Soon after arriving in Japan, they are helped by a rival veteran crime boss who wants to oust Killer the gangster for good and dominate his operations.

It leads to a climax scene where the Killer's gang is invaded on a construction site, complete with diggers and machinery used in the battle.

== Cast ==
- David Chiang
- Ti Lung
- Ching Li
- Yasuaki Kurata
