= Alan Ko =

Taiwanese singer and actor

Alan Kuo
- 柯有倫
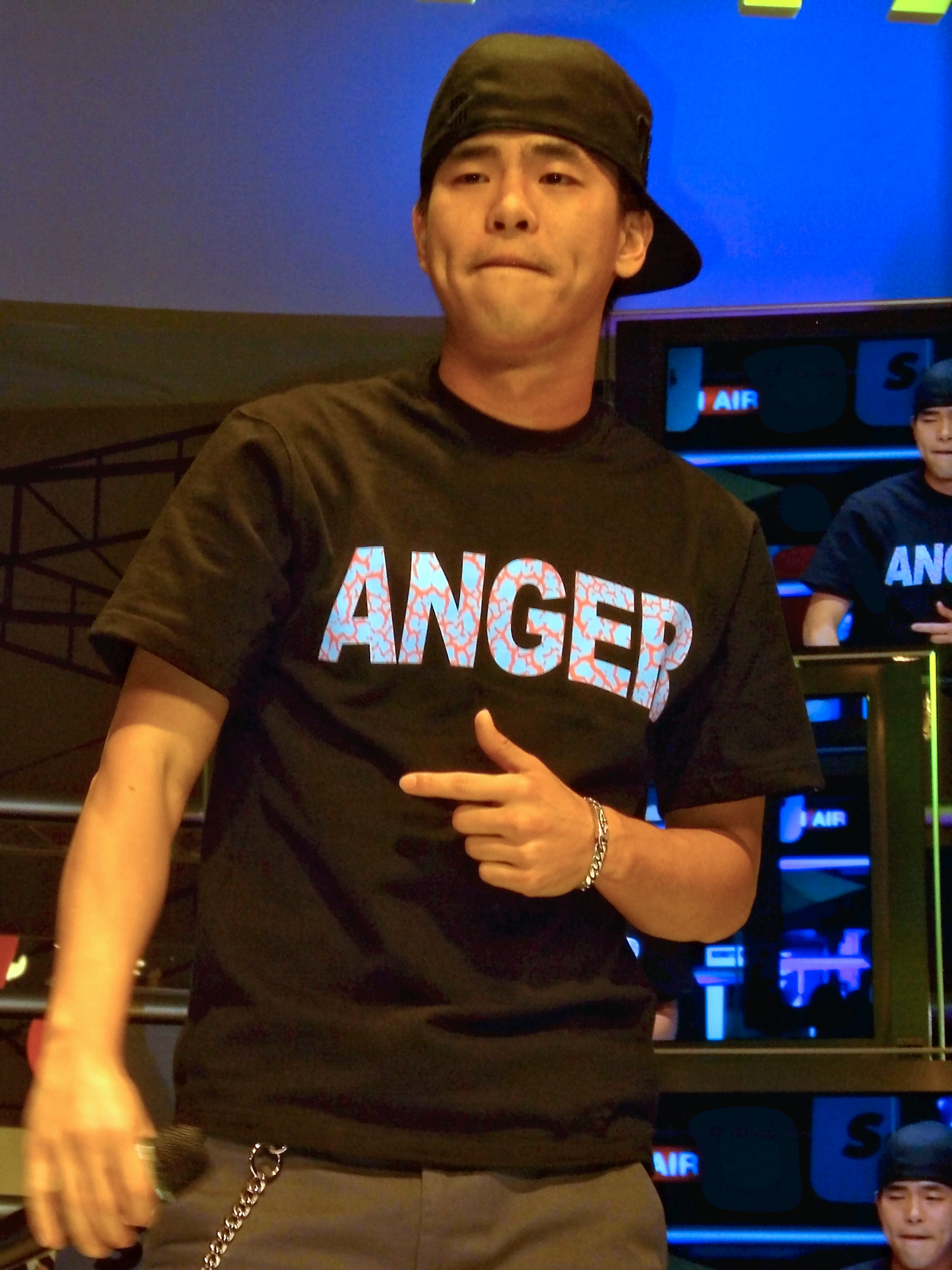
- Alan Ke @ Sony Fair 2008 in Taipei, Taiwan
- Born: Ko You-Lun (柯有倫); January 22, 1981 (age 44); Taipei, Taiwan
- Occupations: Singer-songwriter record producer rapper actor
- Years active: 1986–1987, 1999–present
- Spouse: Donna (m. 2018)
- Children: 1
- Parents: Blackie Ko (father); Sung Lai Wah (mother)
- Musical career
- Also known as: Alan Ke; Alan Kuo
- Origin: Taiwan (Taiwan)
- Genres: Pop rock C-rock; Mandopop; Hip-hop
- Instruments: Guitar; Drums; Piano
- Labels: Sony Music; Epic Records; Columbia Records

Chinese name
- Traditional Chinese: 柯有倫
- Simplified Chinese: 柯有伦
Transcriptions
Standard Mandarin
- Hanyu Pinyin: Kē Yǒulún
Southern Min
- Hokkien POJ: Koa Iú-lûn
- Website: Sony music Alan

Alan Ko (Chinese: 柯有倫; pinyin: Kē Yǒulún; Pe̍h-ōe-jī: Koa Iú-lûn) or Alan Kuo is a Taiwanese singer and actor.

== Career ==
Ko is the son of the late Taiwanese stuntman/actor, Blackie Ko Shou Liang and his wife Sung Lai Wah. For his father, he wrote two songs, each in one of his albums in the same number of track. "Wake Up" and "I Miss You". These two songs shows his relationship with his father and how much his father had changed him. Before receiving the chance to release his first album, he went through a lot of hard work.

Ko was initially a guitarist who had minimal experience writing songs and lyrics. He first entered Alpha Music in 1999, where he worked as a host under Jacky Wu's branch of artists before quitting in 2002. Ko was eventually mentored as he befriended Jay Chou, who told him that he should know how to write his own songs, so that people would want to listen to his music. Ko began to write more as a lyricist, including styles of R&B, rock music, rap, pop music and various genres. Ko's music director required him to edit and edit his songs, every year, every month, every week, and every day. Ko pushed harder on working on his songs for perfection despite his courage being challenged. Within six years of preparation, Ko eventually selected the best 12 songs for all the people anticipating for his music.

Ko's father died of an accident in 2003, but it neither stopped him nor did he want to be like his father, and insisted on going his own route. Prior to his death, his father told Ko "to achieve success and not let him down, or else he would not acknowledge Ko as a son". On August 19, 2005, Alan Kuo's first album came out with 12 songs and gained heavy support by famous Hong Kong singer/actor, Jacky Cheung.

Since then, Ko acted in various shows and films.

== Personal life ==
In 2007, Ko changed his Chinese name from 柯有倫 to 柯有綸 even though he switched his name back to 柯有倫 again in 2011.

In 2018, he married his wife Donna (朵拉), whom he has known for 20 years. The couple were married in Hong Kong. The couple also have a daughter, born in August 2020.

== Discography ==
=== Albums ===
2005 ALAN KUO

- Released: August 19, 2005
- Format: CD
- Label: Sony BMG, Epic Records, Columbia Records
- Chart position: Taiwan: #2

Welcome to mMy World

- Released: June 1, 2007
- Format: CD
- Label: Sony BMG, Epic Records, Columbia Records
- Producer: Alan Ke
- Chart position: Taiwan: #4

One Day

- Released: March 2009
- Format: CD
- Label: Sony Music, Epic Records, Columbia Records

No Fear

- Released: December 3, 2010
- Format: CD
- Label: Forward Music
- Producer: Alan Ke

== Filmography ==
=== TV series ===
- K.O.3an Guo
- Sonic Youth
- Y2K+01
- Mars
- Sweet Relationship (2007)
- OCTB (2017)

=== Movies ===
- The Legend Of Wisely (1987)
- Life Express (2002)
- Happy Feet (2006) (Dub)
- Fate (2008)
- L-O-V-E (2009)
- Goodbye May (2011)
- Din Tao: Leader of the Parade (2012)
- Fearless (2012)
- Hakka Love You (2012)
- The Rooftop (2013)
- Rhythm of the Rain (2013)
- Rookie (2015)
- My Egg Boy (2016)
- Red Line (2023)

== Collaborations ==
- "Celebrate the Day (Mandarin version)" (榮耀的一天) with Yida Huang
- "Carry On" (扛得住) with Alien Huang and Bobby Dou from Alien's final studio album Plan B (Rock Records)
