= The Dragon Lives Again =

1977 Hong Kong film by Law Kei

- Film poster
- Directed by: Law Kei
- Written by: Ke Shek; Leung Wai
- Produced by: Alex Gouw; H. Gozali
- Starring: Leung Siu-Lung; San Yat-Lung; Tan Ching; Eric Tsang; Alexander Grand
- Cinematography: Manny Hoh Ming
- Edited by: Chiang Kuo Chen
- Music by: Frankie Chan
- Production company: Goldig Films (H.K.) Ltd.
- Distributed by: Golden Harvest Cinema (Canada); Cineworld Pictures (United States)
- Release date: 25 March 1977 (Hong Kong)
- Running time: 90 minutes
- Country: Hong Kong
- Language: Mandarin

The Dragon Lives Again (Chinese: 李三腳威震地獄門; lit. 'Lee Three Legs Power Shakes the Gates of Hell'; originally released as Li san jiao wei zhen di yu men and also known as Deadly Hands of Kung Fu) is a 1977 Hong Kong Bruceploitation film in which the soul of Bruce Lee (played by Bruce Leung Siu-Lung) goes to The Underworld. There, the afterlife Lee meets a number of pop culture icons from mostly book based films of the 1960s to the 1970s, including Dracula, James Bond, Zatoichi, The Godfather, The Exorcist, Clint Eastwood and Emmanuelle. Lee befriends The One-Armed Swordsman from the Shaw Brothers Studio, David Carradine dressed like the Warner Brothers Television program Kung Fu main character named Kwai Chang Caine and Popeye from King Features comics and cartoons.

The film towards the beginning gives the announcement of "THIS FILM IS DEDICATED TO MILLIONS WHO LOVE BRUCE LEE".

== Synopsis ==
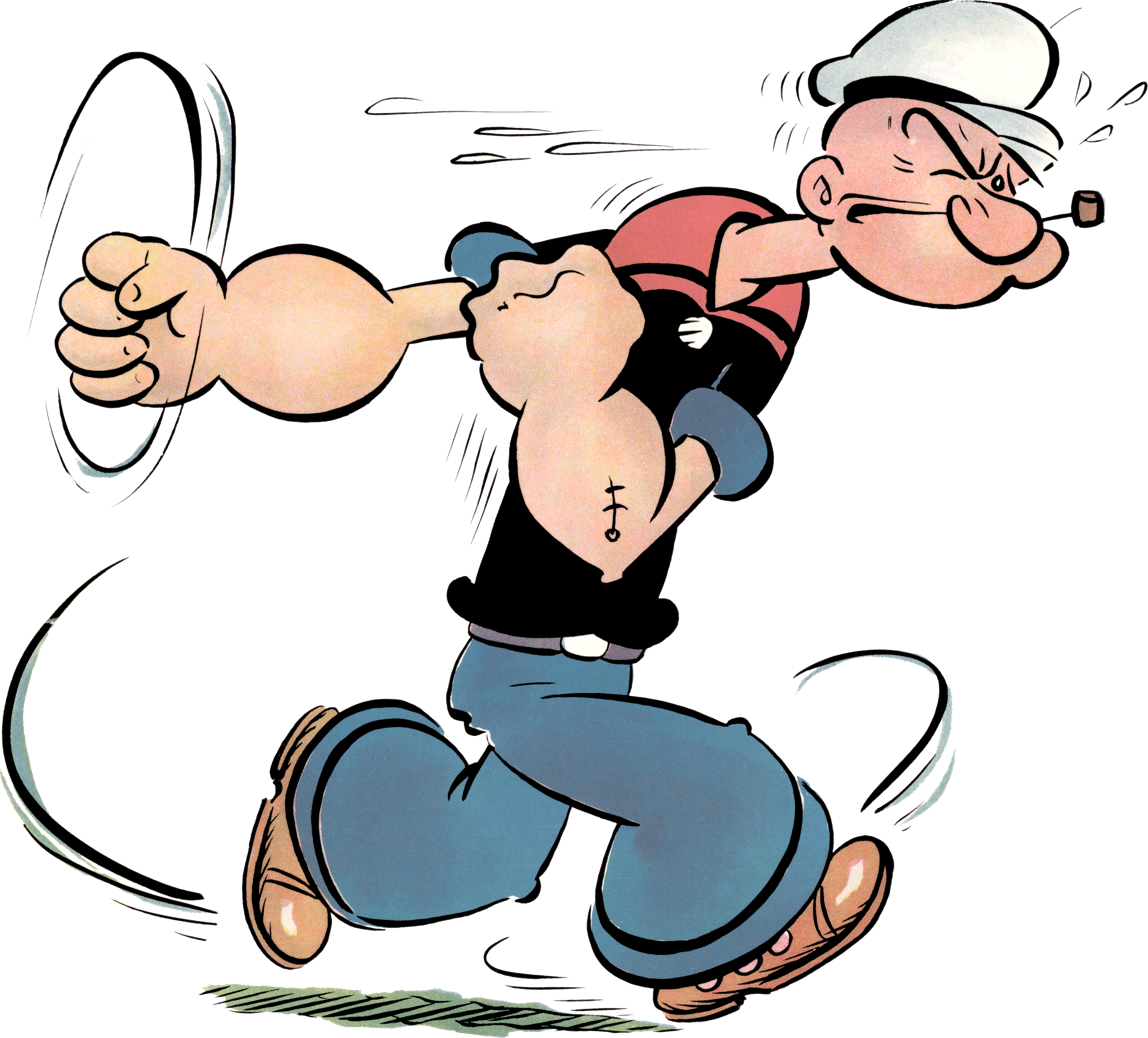
Popeye

After his untimely death, Bruce Lee (Bruce Leung Siu-Lung) wakes up to find himself in the royal court of "The Underworld". Here he meets The King Of The Underworld along with his subjects. Upon questioning The King's power, The King demonstrates his displeasure by shaking a pole that can cause an earthquake through The Underworld, which gives Bruce pause.

Afterwards Bruce goes to a restaurant, where he meets and befriends David Carradine and the jubilant sailor Popeye. He also encounters a criminal mob including James Bond, Zatoichi, and Clint Eastwood, who, as of late, have been terrorizing the denizens of the afterlife. To counter the frequent waves of attacks from the mob, Bruce sets up a martial arts school to help the victims defend themselves. Meanwhile, the criminal mob of pop culture characters, which also includes The Godfather, The Exorcist, and Emmanuelle, is revealed to be planning to eliminate Bruce Lee and create a coup to take over The Underworld. Among the schemers, The Exorcist sends Emmanuelle to have energetic intercourse with the womanizing King in the hopes that he will be induced with cardiac arrest. Around the same time, Dracula is sent to kill Bruce Lee. The plan to kill Bruce fails, leaving Dracula dead, and Bruce discovers a set of written documents that his opponent was carrying as proof of the movement against The King. Upon revealing the documents to The King, he expresses gratitude, promoting Bruce as the new captain of his bodyguard.

Bruce endures a series of victorious battles with the rest of the would-be usurpers, single-handedly putting an end the attempted coup, but is still angered by The King's abuse of power. Soon enough, Bruce decides to face the King head on. However, The King is assisted by the famous Chinese deity Zhong Kui, who summons a group of mummies to combat Bruce. The battle proves difficult for Bruce and he almost meets his match until David Carradine, Fang Gang and Popeye arrive in the nick of time to assist him.

Eventually Bruce and company emerge triumphant, and The King is left pleading for mercy as the infuriated Underworld civilians also approach. The King offers Bruce anything in return for sparing his life, including the throne, but Bruce rejects the offer. Bruce allows The King to keep his throne on the conditions that he lets him go back to Earth and that he will be good to his people. The King agrees and Bruce is levitated back to Earth as everyone watches.

== Characters ==
=== Main Hero ===
- Bruce Lee: A once deceased famous martial artist who lives again. Bruce Lee is also featured in The Deadly Hands of Kung Fu comic series.

=== Lee's Allies ===
- Popeye: Based upon the character from the Popeye comic franchise and from the Popeye cartoon series.
- David Carradine: Based upon the film actor and is dressed like Kwai Chang Caine, who is from Kung Fu. David Carradine is also featured in The Deadly Hands of Kung Fu comic series. He also gets called "Kwai Chang" only one time during the film
- The One-Armed Swordsman: Based upon Fang Gang, who is also known as The One-Armed Swordsman, for whom this name is also based upon from the film franchise and from the Manhua series. He also gets called "One Arm" only one time during the film.

=== Lee's Opponents ===
- Dracula: Based upon the character from The Tomb of Dracula comic series.
- Emmanuelle: Based upon the character known as Emmanuelle, who is from the novel and who is also from the film series.
- James Bond: Based upon the character from every series of the same name.
- Clint Eastwood: Based upon the film actor and is dressed like The Man With No Name, who is from the Dollars Trilogy.
- The Exorcist: Based upon the character of Shinichi Koga's Manga series entitled The Exorcist.
- The Godfather: Based upon The Godfather Of Rock And Roll best known as Elvis Presley.
- The King Of The Underworld: Based upon King Yama, adapted from Buddhist beliefs.
- Yang Yu-Huan: A concubine of The King Of The Underworld.
- Chao Fei-Yen: A concubine of The King Of The Underworld.
- Zhong Kui: Based upon Zhong Kui, adapted from Taoist beliefs.
- Zatoichi: Based upon the character from every series of the same name.
- Skeleton Men Army: An homage to the skeleton man character that is from the Kriminal comic series and that is also from the Kriminal film duology.
- Mummy Men Army: An homage to the mummy man character that is from The Living Mummy comic franchise.

=== Extra Characters ===
- Slim: A police officer based upon a character of Bud Abbott.
- Tubby: A police officer based upon a character of Lou Costello.

== Cast ==
Of the cast, Eric Tsang, who played Popeye, now has a successful acting career in the Hong Kong film industry, gaining popularity in the Lucky Stars series (My Lucky Stars, Twinkle, Twinkle Lucky Stars), and appearing in a number of films with Jackie Chan and Sammo Hung. More recently, he won acclaim for his role in the Infernal Affairs trilogy. He has won a Golden Horse Award and two Hong Kong Film Awards.

Alexander Grand, who plays James Bond, is billed as "Champion-boxer of Europe.", while the actress who plays Emmanuelle is only billed as "Jenny, Emmanuelle of N. Europe."

== Reaction ==
Many contemporary critics have shown affection for The Dragon Lives Again. Nobody calls it great filmmaking, but most applaud it for its ridiculousness and surrealism. In his three-part essay about Bruceploitation for Impact Magazine, Dean Meadows said:

"The Dragon Lives Again was one of the greatest and craziest of all Bruce Lee exploitation movies. Featuring the lesser known Bruce Liang, this was tongue-in-cheek from start to finish with a synopsis that was and still is unbelievable. The Little Dragon has passed over and is in purgatory anticipating judgement from the gods. Whilst there he tangles with a vast array of fictionalised and popular characters, all awaiting their individual fate. Bond is there. That's right, James Bond, along with "prince of darkness" Dracula and erotic icon, Emmanuelle. Now if that wasn't wacky enough, Bruce teams up with his good friends, Kwai Chang Caine and wait for it ... Popeye to defeat the enemy! Of course the Little Dragon does have a secret weapon, known simply as "the third leg of Bruce" (ouch!). The movie was dedicated to all fans of the great master, but whilst hilarious today, audiences would fail to see the humour at the time of its release."

In a review for Film Threat, Phil Hall awarded the film four stars out of a possible five:

"What any of this has to do with Bruce Lee's legacy is never entirely clear. But when you have a scenario when Clint Eastwood and James Bond are trying to take over a Chinese purgatory and Bruce Lee calls on Popeye the Sailor to help save the day (not counting the interlude for the cast to talk about Bruce Lee's penis!), it would seem that cogent and coherent thought is not high on the priority list. The Dragon Lives Again will probably annoy enthusiasts of martial arts films and the diehard fans of Bruce Lee, but it will provide endless amusement for those who enjoy watching crazy films while filling their systems with endless mugs of beer or puffs of weed."

== See also ==
- List of James Bond parodies
