= Delightful Forest =

1972 Hong Kong film by Chang Cheh

- Film poster
- Directed by: Chang Cheh; Pao Hsueh-Li
- Written by: Katy Chin Shu-Mei; Chang Cheh; Ni Kuang
- Produced by: Runme Shaw
- Starring: Ti Lung; Tin Ching; Zhu Mu; Lee Man Tai; Chiang Nan
- Cinematography: Yuen Teng-Bong
- Edited by: Kwok Ting-Hung
- Music by: Frankie Chan
- Production company: Shaw Brothers Studio
- Release date: 20 September 1972 (Hong Kong)
- Running time: 92 minutes
- Country: Hong Kong
- Language: Mandarin

Delightful Forest is a 1972 Hong Kong film directed by Chang Cheh and Pao Hsueh-Li.

== Cast ==
- Ti Lung
- Tin Ching
- Zhu Mu
- Lee Man Tai
- Chiang Nan
- Nam Wai Lit
- Wong Kwong Yue
- Wong Ching Ho
- Yue Fung
- Kong Ling
