= Queen of Fist =

1972 Hong Kong film by Lung Chien

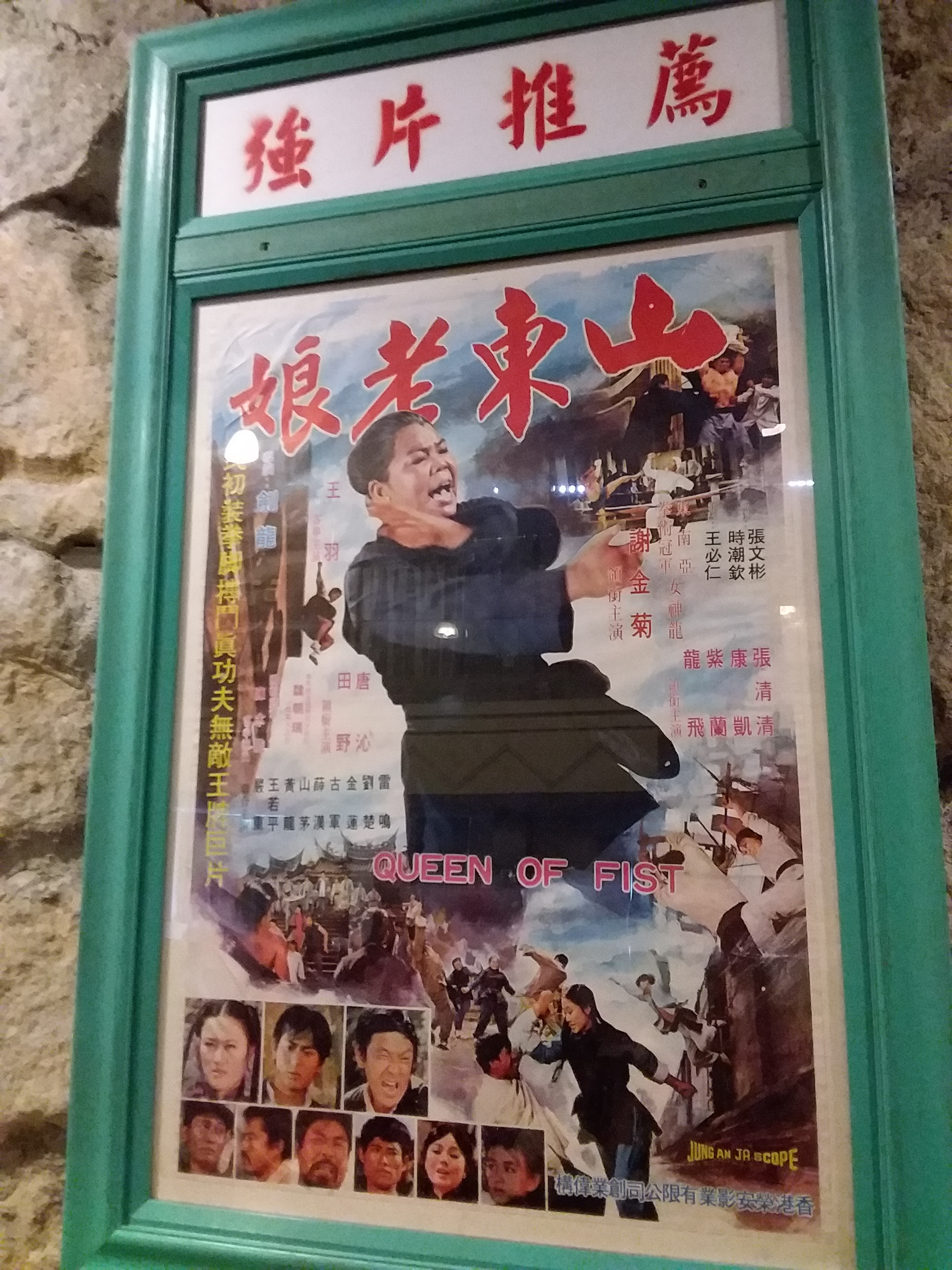
- Poster
- Shan dong lao niang
- Directed by: Lung Chien
- Written by: Chun Ku
- Produced by: Wen-Pin Chang; Chao Chin Shih
- Starring: Hsien Chin-Chu; Wong Fei-lung; Jimmy Wang Yu
- Music by: Zhou Liang
- Release date: 1972
- Running time: 90 minutes
- Country: Hong Kong
- Language: Mandarin

Queen of Fist
- Traditional Chinese: 山東老娘
- Simplified Chinese: 山东老娘
Transcriptions
Standard Mandarin
- Hanyu Pinyin: Shāndōng Lǎoniáng

Queen of Fist, also known as Kung Fu Mama (Chinese: 山東老娘), is a 1972 Hong Kong action martial arts film directed by Lung Chien, produced by Raymond Chow, and starring Hsien Chin-Chu and Wong Fei-lung.

== Plot ==
An elderly mother travels to Shanghai to look for her missing son. To earn a living, she performs as a street artist with her grandchildren. She discovers that Lin Hie, boss of Shanghai French Concession, killed her son and is holding his daughter (her granddaughter) in captivity.

So, she wants to kill the gang leader.

== Cast ==
- Hsien Chin-Chu as Kung Fu Mama
- Zhang Qingqing as Ma Ai-Chen
- Jimmy Wang Yu as Ma Yung-Chen
- Kang Kai
- Tzu Lan
- Wong Fei-lung as the gang leader
- Tang Chin
- Tian Ye
- Jin Dao
- Zhou Gui
- Huang Long
- Shan Mao
