= Changing Love =

1972 Hong Kong film by Faan Daan

- Directed by: Faan Daan
- Release date: 1972
- Country: Hong Kong
- Language: Mandarin

Changing Love is a 1972 Hong Kong film.
