= Blood of the Leopard =

1972 Taiwanese-Hong Kong film by Lung Chien

Blood Of The Leopard
- Xue bao
- Directed by: Lung Chien
- Release date: 1972
- Countries: Taiwan, Hong Kong
- Language: Mandarin

Blood of the Leopard (Chinese: 血豹; pinyin: Xuè Bào) is a 1972 kung fu action film directed by Lung Chien. The film is a Taiwanese-Hong Kong co-production.

== Cast ==
- Sun Yueh
- Kong Ban
- Wang Tai Lang
- Chan Hung Lit
- Cheung Ching Ching
- Ma Kei
- Got Siu Bo
- O Yau Man
- Hon Kong
