= Lai Siu-fong =

Chinese actress from Hong Kong

Siu-Fong Lai
- Chinese: 黎少芳
- Other names: Lai Siu-Fong, Lai Sui Fong, Li Shaofang
- Occupation: Actress
- Years active: 1965–1992

Siu-Fong Lai (Chinese: 黎少芳) is a Chinese actress from Hong Kong. Lai has over 25 film credits.

== Career ==
In 1965, Lai began her acting career. Lai appeared in My Darling Wife, a 1965 drama film directed by Chan Wan. Lai is known for a role in Old Master Q, a 1975 comedy film directed by Lee Tit, Chu Yat-Hung, King Weng. Lai is Mrs. Mok in The Private Eyes, a 1976 comedy film directed by Michael Hui. Lai appeared as Cheung Dai Ma in The Secret, a 1979 thriller drama and first feature film directed by Ann Hui. Lai's last films were Something Incredible - Dead Deadlock, a 1992 film and Stuntmen, a 1992 drama film directed by Yuen Shu-Wai. Lai has over 25 film credits.

== Filmography ==
=== Films ===
- 1965 Love of A Pedicab Man (aka The Love of a Rickshaw Coolie)
- 1965 My Darling Wife
- 1965 Gong zi duo qing - Siu Nai
- 1965 A Secluded Orchid by the Sea - Mother Lee
- 1966 The Lonely Woman
- 1966 Love Burst - Third Aunt
- 1966 The Story Between Hong Kong and Macau - Mrs Luk/Hung Mui's landlady
- 1966 A Spring Celebration of the Swallows' Return - Kwan Sing-To's wife
- 1966 Who's the Real Murderer? - Yeung Ka-Fai's wife
- 1966 But How Cruel You Are
- 1966 To Marry a Ghost
- 1967 Family Man
- 1967 The Divorce Brinkmanship
- 1972 Four Girls from Hong Kong
- 1975 Old Master Q
- 1976 The 76 Humors II
- 1976 The Private Eyes - Mrs. Mok
- 1978 Chameleon
- 1978 Lam Ah Chun
- 1978 For Whom to Be Murdered
- 1979 One Way Only
- 1979 The Secret - Cheung Dai-Ma. Note: First featured film directed by Ann Hui
- 1981 Charlie's Bubble
- 1986 Parking Service - Uncle Kau's wife
- 1987 People's Hero - Bank customer
- 1988 How to Pick Girls Up - Jenny's Aunt
- 1992 Stuntmen
- 1992 Something Incredible - Dead Deadlock
