= Big Fight at the Jenkins Saloon =

1886 gunfight in Tascosa, Texas, US

The Big Fight at the Jenkins Saloon
- John Gottlieb Lang
- Location: Jenkins Saloon, Tascosa, Texas, United States
- Date: March 21, 1886
- Deaths: 4
- Injuries: 2

The Big Fight at the Jenkins Saloon, also known as the Tascosa Gunfight or simply the Big Fight, was an incident that took place in the Old West town of Tascosa, Texas, on March 21, 1886, between members of two Texas Panhandle ranch factions: the LS Ranch's Home Rangers and a group of small ranchers and cattle rustlers known as "The System".

== Background ==
In the spring of 1884, Pat Garrett came to the Texas Panhandle as newly appointed captain of the Texas Ranger Division. A range war had been brewing in the state as livestock theft was common. He was tasked by the Texas State government and by the big ranchers of the Canadian River with organizing a company of Texas Rangers to put a stop to the rampant rustling and re-branding of cattle. He set up his headquarters at the LS Ranch and petitioned the government for official papers so that he could go to work. In the following months, he and his men, known locally as the 'LS Rangers' were successful in policing the area and preventing the same kind of feud that resulted in New Mexico's Lincoln County War just eight years earlier. In the spring of 1885, the rangers were disbanded and Garrett returned to New Mexico. The rest of Garrett's men continued to work for the LS Ranch as rangers, but since they were no longer officially Texas Rangers, their hard-drinking and arrogant ways began to stir local resentment. Ex- Texas Ranger Ed King was particularly troublesome, as he was known to be especially arrogant, quarrelsome when drunk and quick to draw his gun at any excuse. In Tascosa, the rangers became known as 'barroom gladiators'.

The final straw came when Sally Emory, who worked at the Jenkins Saloon, dumped her boyfriend, bartender Lamar Albert (Lem) Woodruff (who the rangers suspected to be a System man), and took up with Ed King. In the days preceding the fight, a drunken Ed King would taunt Woodruff, calling him 'Pretty Lem' and endeavoring to humiliate him by forcing him to call King "Daddy."

== The Big Fight ==
On the evening of March 20, 1886, Ed King, his friend John Gottlieb Lang, and two other LS ranch hands, Frank Valley and Fred Chilton, rode into Tascosa to participate in a local dance. In the early hours of the 21st, the four men left the dance and headed into town, where Ed King was hoping to meet Sally Emory. Valley and Chilton entered the Equity Bar while Lang tied up the group's horses. Meanwhile, Ed King and Sally met outside the Jenkins Saloon at the corner of Spring and Main Streets. There, King was hailed by someone in the shadow of the saloon. Stepping up onto the porch, King was shot in the face. Lem Woodruff rushed out, jammed the barrel of a Winchester against King's neck, and pulled the trigger. King died immediately. Sally Emory ran away down Spring Street.

Seeing his friend shot down, John Lang rushed down Main Street to the Equity Bar. Finding his friends there, he demanded extra weapons from the bartender, but the bartender refused. Lang, Valley and Chilton rushed out towards the Jenkins Saloon. Finding no one in front, they went around the back, just as Lem Woodruff, Louis Bousman, "The Catfish Kid" (John Gough), and brothers "Squirrel-Eye Charley" and "Poker Tom" Emory exited the back of the saloon. Emory was an alias—it is now known that Charley and Tom were Charles August Arnim and William Oscar Arnim. Gunfire erupted immediately. Woodruff and Charley Emory were shot first. As Frank Valley ran towards the door of an adobe shack behind the saloon from which gunfire had erupted, he was shot in the head as soon he opened the door to enter. At the sound of the gunfire, local restaurant owner Jesse Sheets opened a door and stepped out into the open. Chilton, mistaking him for Bousman, shot him in the face, and he fell dead. Chilton was then shot in the chest by someone (likely the Catfish Kid) shooting from a woodpile outside the saloon. Dying, he handed his gun to Lang.

John Lang found himself alone and being fired at in a crossfire from the saloon and from gunmen shooting from behind the woodpile. He retreated up Spring Street, firing as he went, while bullets tore into the ground and through the air around him. His fight ended as he turned a corner and was joined by friends from the Equity Bar. The men made their way back to the western part of Main Street. Soon afterwards, Sheriff Jim East and his deputy arrived on the scene. Lang offered his services as a deputy and the men went back towards the Jenkins Saloon. When they got there, the Catfish Kid ran from the woodpile and was shot at. He fell, groaning and choking. But it was a ruse: as soon as he was left unattended, he ran off, unhurt.

== Aftermath ==
The fight had left John Lang with a bullet through his coat, but without a scratch. His three friends lay dead or dying where they had been shot, as did Jesse Sheets. Lem Woodruff survived, even though he had been badly wounded in the abdomen. Charley Emory, who had also been wounded, also survived.

Murder charges were filed against Woodruff, Bousman, Emory, Lang and the Catfish Kid. The first trial ended in a hung jury. In the second, all the defendants were acquitted. The Catfish Kid died in prison in 1890 after killing an unarmed man in another incident in Tascosa. Charley Emory died in 1897. Lem Woodruff moved to Hot Springs, Arkansas, where he died in 1902. Tom Emory died in 1914. Louis Bousman died in Oklahoma in January 1942.

According to the Lang family, John Lang went on to become Amarillo Town Sheriff for a short time before rejoining his family in Oregon. In 1897 he took part in the Klondike Gold Rush. In 1898 he joined the Oregon Volunteers and served in the Philippines during the Spanish–American War. After the war, he returned to Oregon. A long-time Democrat, Lang represented his district in the Oregon state legislature. He also served as mayor of Haines, Oregon. From the 1900s until the 1930s, he tried his hand as a gold prospector. The last living participant of the gunfight, he died in April 1942.

The gunfight at Tascosa is little-known today, but at the time it was more famous than the gunfight at the O.K. Corral, having similar causes and involving more fatalities than the shootout at Tombstone, Arizona.

== Bibliography ==
- McCarty, John Lawton (1988) [1946]. Maverick Town: The Story of Old Tascosa. University of Oklahoma Press. p. 287. ISBN 9780806120898.
- Nolan, Frederick (2007). Tascosa: Its Life and Gaudy Times. Lubbock, TX: Texas Tech University Press. ISBN 9780896726048.
- Sullivan, Dulcie (1968). The LS Brand: The Story of a Texas Panhandle Ranch. University of Texas Press.
