= Big Fight: Big Trouble in the Atlantic Ocean =

1992 video game

- Japanese arcade flyer of Big Fight.
- Developer: Tatsumi
- Publisher: Tatsumi
- Platform: Arcade
- Release: 1992
- Genre: Beat 'em up/2D Versus Fighting
- Mode: Up to 2 players simultaneously
- Arcade system: Round Up 5

Big Fight (ビッグファイト), fully titled as Big Fight: Big Trouble in the Atlantic Ocean, is a 1992 fighting game / belt scrolling beat 'em up-hybrid arcade game developed and published by Tatsumi, and is one of their last arcade games. Tatsumi added two different modes to Big Fight: a beat 'em up mode and a versus fighting game mode.

== Gameplay ==
In "Mission Mode" (or "STORY Mode" according to the official website and arcade flyer), similar to Final Fight, one or two players must choose between three characters, Kevin, Gear or Zill, before beginning the game simultaneously. Each character has its own fighting style, special moves and statistics. Players control with a joystick and two buttons: one for attacking and one for jumping. Like Final Fight, players can press both buttons to perform special moves that attack in both directions, which costs health. Players are also able to attack their opponents lying on the floor, throw their opponents, pick up health items for health recovery and use weapons as additional ways to protect themselves while fighting enemies. Some weapons can be used several times, some only once.

Unlike Final Fight, at the end of several levels, players will have to choose between three routes to walk through, each having their own difficulty. At the end of each later level, players will face a boss, and when he or she is defeated, he or she will join in and become playable while the players can select whoever teamed up with the last characters players played, except for the last two Dr. D and TX-No.3. Another feature that differentiates it from other beat 'em-ups is when a player is knocked to the ground, an "Anger Power" bar appears, requiring the player to rapidly press the punch button to fill it up before it vanishes. When successfully filled, the players' characters will be lightning charged and automatically perform their special moves while setting any nearby enemies on blue fire and stay charged up for a short time. Players are also able to shoot blue flames with the punch buttons while charged.

In order to access "1P vs. 2P Mode" (or "VS. Mode" according to website and flyer), players must insert two coins to access this mode similar to most fighting games at the time, choose between the three heroes and five bosses and knock out one another in two-out-of-three rounds. The winner will either move on to fight against CPU players or another real player will join in and choose a character, while the winner will not be able to select another character. The fighting rules are the same as "Mission Mode", but in versus-style.

=== Characters ===
- Kevin (ケビン) - The lead character of the group. From England, he has balanced statistics and fast-paced attacks.
- Zill (ジル) - She is agile, but fragile, and performs good kicking and jumping techniques.
- Gear (ギア) - A United States Navy captain who became Kevin's assistant. He is sluggish, but performs destructive moves.
- Garuda (ガルーダ) - Half of him is Native American, but the other is unknown.
- Mevella (メベーラ) - An agile dominatrix who uses a whip to attack at long range.
- Pharaoh (ファラオ) - An ancient Egyptian ruler who is mysterious and was unexpectedly resurrected from his grave hauled on Dr. D's.
- Gonza (ゴンザ) - A kabuki who attacks with sumo techniques and can throw one of his getas like a boomerang.
- Chen (チェン) - A pirate with powerful slashing techniques.
- TX-No.3 - Dr. D's bionic weapon. It attacks with extensive arms and long-range laser blasters.
- Dr. D - The main antagonist of the game.
