= Wang Kuan-hsiung =

Taiwanese actor

Wang Kuan Hsiung
- 王冠雄
- Born: Wang Feng; October 10, 1949 (age 77); Tainan, Taiwan
- Other names: Wong Goon Hung, Champ Wang, Frank Wong
- Occupations: Actor and director
- Years active: 1972 - 1984

Wang Kuan-hsiung is a Taiwanese former actor who was a well-known and popular leading man in the kung fu film genre of the 1970s and 1980s.

== Career ==
Wang is mostly known for his role as Chan Ming Lung aka "The Iron Ox" in Iron Ox, The Tiger's Killer (1974), which is a tale about a student taking on a group of men, the Five Tigers, in duels to avenge the death of his teacher. This film also featured a well-known actor of the genre, Wong Fei-Lung. Other films in a similar vein around the same time were Two Dragons Against Tiger (1974) and Chase Step By Step (1975).

Wang's early films include Kung Fu Queen, Chaochow Guy, Chase Step by Step, Iron Ox The Tiger's Killer (aka The Angry Fist), and Two Dragons Against Tiger, which were all "old school" type of kung fu films that were produced in the 1970s.

Wang received a Golden Horse Award for the film White Jasmine, aka Mo li hua, a 1980 film that also starred Sylvia Chang.

Wang later branched out to writing and directing films that included Lewd Lizard (1979) and Yellow Skin (1985), as well as some production work.

Wang retired from the film business in 1984.

His filmography is somewhat confusing and may be more extensive than most sites and reference books indicate. However, he has appeared in over 40 movies and is credited under a multitude of names, including:

- Champ Wang
- Frank Wong
- Goon-Hung Wong
- Jacky Wong
- Kuan-hsing Wang
- Kuan Hsiung Huang
- Wang Kuan Hsing
- Wang Kwn-Shong
- Wong Goon-Hung
- Wong Gwan-Sheong
- Wong Koon Hung
- Wong Kwan-Hsiung
