= Margaret Hsing =

Chinese actress from Hong Kong

- Chinese: 邢慧
- Born: Hsing Yung-hui; November 8, 1944; Shanghai, China
- Died: 2009 (aged 64–65)
- Other names: Margaret Hsing Hui, Hsing Hui, Ying Wai, Xing Yong-Hui, Hui Xing
- Occupation: Actress
- Years active: 1962–1973

Margaret Hsing (Chinese: 邢慧) (1944-2009) was a Chinese actress from Hong Kong.

== Early life ==
On November 8, 1944, Hsing was born as Hsing Yung-hui in Shanghai, China.

== Education ==
Hsing graduated from New Method College in Hong Kong. Hsing learned dancing in Japan.

== Career ==
In 1962, at age 18, Hsing became a Shaw Brothers actress in Hong Kong. Hsing is known for her dancing abilities in films. Hsing debuted in The Dancing Millionairess, a 1964 Mandarin Musical film directed by Doe Ching. Hsing also appeared as Chin Ching-Yu in The Sword and the Lute, a 1967 Martial Arts film directed by Hsu Tseng-Hung. Hsing's last film was Woman of the Night, a 1973 Adult drama film directed by Yu Kuan-Jen. Hsing is credited with over 25 films.

== Filmography ==
=== Films ===
This is a partial list of films.

- 1964 The Dancing Millionairess - Chorus girl, Dancer
- 1964 The Last Woman of Shang - Dancing girl
- 1966 The Joy of Spring - Hsing Yong-Hui
- 1967 The Sword and the Lute - Chin Ching-Yu
- 1968 The Enchanted Chamber - Chiang Wen-Tsui
- 1970 The 5 Billion Dollar Legacy - Situ Pei-Fang
- 1972 The Bride from Hell - Anu / Feng Ai Jiao
- 1973 Woman of the Night - Su Xiao-Qi

== Personal life ==
In 1973, at age 29, Hsing immigrated to Los Angeles, California. Hsing developed mental illness. In 1994, after an argument, Hsing killed her mother with an axe. Hsing served 11 years in prison for manslaughter, and in 2007, she completed her prison sentence. In 2009, Hsing died.
