= Action Tae Kwon Do =

1972 Hong Kong-South Korean film by Yang Man Yi

- Film poster for 1973 South Korean release
- Traditional Chinese: 戰北國
- Simplified Chinese: 战北国
- Hanyu Pinyin: Zhàn Běi Guó
- Jyutping: Zin3 Bak1 Gwok3
- Directed by: Yang Man Yi (Note: Yang Man Yi was the pseudonym for South Korean film director Jang Jin Won (Korean: 장진원; Hanja: 場鎭源; born in 1922) when he was working for the Hong Kong film industry, who entered the industry in 1972.)
- Produced by: Yang Man Yi
- Release date: 1972
- Country: Hong Kong
- Language: Mandarin

Action Tae Kwon Do is a 1972 martial arts film directed by Yang Man Yi. The film is also known by its Chinese title Zhan Bei Guo (traditional Chinese: 戰北國; simplified Chinese: 战北国) and by the Korean title Hyopgi (Korean: 협기, traditional Chinese: 俠妓; simplified Chinese: 侠妓) during its 1973 South Korean release. It was directed and produced by Yang Man Yi (楊曼怡). The film stars Jason Pai Piao. In his first film appearance, Young-Moon Kwon stars in the film. Kwon is also an action director.

== Plot ==
The film is set in Korea in 1972. Living in the country, Japanese people behave lawlessly and bully the Koreans. Indignant at their behaviour, a group of people collaborate on fighting back. Through koto and sake, a duo of females beguile the Japanese men at the beginning of their scheme. A woman's fiancé, Hon San, begrudgingly participates in the rebellion. A group of male youths who are good at kicking join in on the scheme through Hon San's inadvertent efforts. A fierce fight starts after being triggered by the person who plays the koto.

== Reception ==
Shin Min Daily News said that Jason Pai Piao's battle performances were "very outstanding".
