= Pursuit (1972 Hong Kong film) =

1972 Hong King film by Cheng Kang

Pursuit is a 1972 film produced by Shaw Brothers studio, directed Cheng Kang, starring Yueh Hua, Wang Chin Feng and Fan Mei Sheng.
