= Life Express (2004 film) =

2004 Hong Kong-Taiwanese film by Blackie Ko

- Official poster
- Traditional Chinese: 生死速遞
- Simplified Chinese: 生死速递
- Hanyu Pinyin: Shēng Sǐ Sù Dì
- Jyutping: Sang1 Sei2 Ceok1 Dai6
- Directed by: Blackie Ko
- Screenplay by: Blackie Ko; Raymond Wong; Chai Hong-bing; Kerrick Wong; Lola Huo; Kong Shui-chung; Wang Ying-qing
- Produced by: Kerrick Wong
- Starring: Richie Jen; Ruby Lin; Blackie Ko
- Cinematography: Horace Wong
- Edited by: Chan Kei-hop
- Music by: Fang Tsun-per; Lin Han
- Distributed by: Intercontinental Film Distribution (HK)
- Release dates: 25 March 2004 (Hong Kong); 26 June 2004 (Taiwan)
- Running time: 90 minutes
- Countries: Hong Kong; Taiwan
- Languages: Cantonese; Mandarin

Life Express is a 2004 action drama film directed by and co-starring Blackie Ko in his final film appearance before his death in 2003. A Hong Kong-Taiwanese co-production, the film also stars Richie Jen and Ruby Lin.

== Synopsis ==
The film revolves around a little boy who has leukemia and is waiting for a marrow transplant. While back in Taiwan, it concentrates on the story of a doctor, Kao Chi-yuen (Richie Jen) and a nurse, Suen Yan-yan (Ruby Lin), who is his girlfriend. Chi-yuen is a young doctor who stands for justice and does the best he can to help his patients.

They cannot find a willing bone marrow donor. They seek help from a prisoner, Ng Sung-yung (Blackie Ko). Ng is convinced to become a bone marrow donor for the little boy. The marrow must be transferred from Taiwan to Beijing in 24 hours, but an earthquake causes a power cut and also damages a bridge on the way to the airport. The car has to fly across the gap.

Luckily, they make it in time for the airplane. At the airport, Yan-yan accepts Chi-yuen's marriage proposal. The transplant operation is successful.

== Cast ==
- Richie Jen as Kao Chi-yuen doctor
- Ruby Lin as Suen Yan-yan. a social Worker
- Blacky Ko as Ng Sung-yung, a prisoner and bone marrow donor
- Jiang Shan as Kuen
- Gao Shu-guang as Dr. Lee Chu
- Shi Yao as Yin-yin's mother
- Liu Ci-hang as Luk-fai
- Du Wei as Chan Kin-kao
- Alan Ke as Bone marrow donor
- Man Ying as Ng's mother
- Morris Rong as Injured man
- Yan Manqiu as Mrs. Chan
- Tsai Chen-nam as Ng's cellmate
- Niu Ben as Luk-fai's grandfather
- Chu Chung-heng as Bon
