= Yasuaki Kurata =

Japanese actor and martial artist

- 倉田 保昭
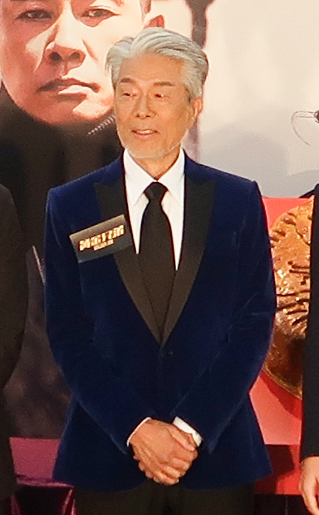
- Kurata in 2018
- Born: March 20, 1946 (age 80); Tsukuba, Ibaraki, Japanese Empire
- Other names: David Kurata; Shoji Kurata; Cang Tian Bao Zhao
- Education: Nihon University
- Occupations: Actor; martial artist
- Years active: 1966–present

Japanese name
- Kanji: 倉田 保昭
- Hiragana: くらた やすあき
Transcriptions
- Romanization: Kurata Yasuaki

Yasuaki Kurata (Japanese: 倉田 保昭, romanized: Kurata Yasuaki; born March 20, 1946) is a Japanese actor and martial artist. He has worked extensively in Hong Kong action films, as well as in his native country, and is a two-time Hong Kong Film Award nominee.

== Early life ==
Kurata was born and raised in Sakura-mura, Niihari District, Ibaraki (now part of Tsukuba). He began studying Shitō-ryū karate under his father from a young age, and holds a 7th dan black belt. He also holds black belts in Judo (3rd dan), and Aikido (2nd dan), and also practices Kendo.

He studied performing arts at Nihon University and Toei Theater School.

== Career ==
In 1966, Kurata began his career as an actor in Marude Dameo, a Japanese TV series.

In 1971, Kurata made his Hong Kong debut in the Shaw Brothers Studio kung-fu movie Angry Guest (悪客). He went on to appear in numerous other films and TV series in the genre. In Japan, he gained popularity for his role in the television series G-Men '75. He is perhaps best known for his extended battle against Jet Li in Fist of Legend and for his villainous role in So Close. He is fluent in Cantonese and befriended Bruce Lee during his career.

In addition to acting, Kurata runs the stunt agency Kurata Promotion (established in 1976 under the name Kurata Action Club), taught at a private college (University of Creation; Art, Music & Social Work), serves as chief advisor to the All Japan Nunchaku League, and in 2004 published the book Hong Kong Action Star Kōyūroku (香港アクションスター交友録). He runs karate dojos in Tokyo, Osaka and Hong Kong.

Kenji Tanigaki is one of Kurata's pupils.

== Filmography ==
=== Films ===
Release	Title	Role	Country	Category	Notes
1967.06.29	Organized Violence 2 (続・組織暴力)	Karate student (学生の空手使い)	Japan	Yakuza (ヤクザ)	
1970.08.11	The Militarists (激動の昭和史 軍閥)		Japan	World War II (第二次世界大戦)	
1972.02.29	Angry Guest (惡客)	Isamu Katsu (勝勇)	Hong Kong	Martial arts (武術)	
1972.03.10	The King of Boxers (小拳王)	Tu Pien	Hong Kong	Martial arts (武術)	
1972	Prodigal Boxer (方世玉)	"Iron Fist" Tan Feijiao (譚飛腳)	Hong Kong	Wuxia (武俠)	Prodigal Boxer [1] (方世玉)
1972	Tiger (爬山虎)	Shih Tien	Taiwan	Martial arts (武術)	
1972.12.06	Kung Fu, the Invincible Fist (餓虎狂龍)	Cpt. Jai Tai	Hong Kong	Martial arts (武術)	
1972.12.22	Four Riders (四騎士)	Lei Tai	Hong Kong	Action (動作)	
1972.12.22	Kung Fu Inferno (強中手)	Chen Hongwen (陳洪文)	Taiwan	Martial arts (武術)	
1973.01.26	The Rage of Wind (猛虎下山)	Shirō Katayama (片山四郎)	Hong Kong	Martial arts (武術)	
1973.02.10	Knight Errant (英雄本色)	Tetsurō	Hong Kong	Martial arts (武術)	
1973.03.01	Fist of Unicorn (麒麟掌)	Sun	Hong Kong	Martial arts (武術)	
1973.04.05	A Gathering of Heroes (趕盡殺絕)		Hong Kong	Martial arts (武術)	
1973	Fists of Vengeance (除暴)	Kiro-san	Taiwan	Martial arts (武術)	
1973	Unsubdued Furies (怒雙衝冠)		Hong Kong	Martial arts (武術)	
1973.06.28	Win Them All (大小通吃)		Hong Kong	Martial arts (武術)	
1973.07.19	Seven to One (女英雄飛車奪寶)	Lung Chien	Hong Kong	Martial arts (武術)	
1973	Kung Fu Powerhouse (死對頭)		Taiwan	Martial arts (武術)	
1973	Ferocious to Ferocious (aka Flash Challenger) (狼對狼)	Wang Hongzhang (王洪彰)	Taiwan	Martial arts (武術)	
1973	The Flying Tiger (飛虎小霸王)	Tang Sheng (湯生)	Taiwan	Martial arts (武術)	
1973	A Girl Called Tigress (雙面女煞星)	Chiau Kung	Taiwan	Martial arts (武術)	
1973.09.28	Black Panther (黑豹)	Chang Hui-Feng	Hong Kong	Martial arts (武術)	
1973.12.21	Gold Snatchers (虎拳)	Fang Ming	Hong Kong	Martial arts (武術)	
1974	Fists for Revenge (大追蹤)	Fan Te	Taiwan	Martial arts (武術)	
1974.01.03	Fatal Strike (兩虎惡鬥)		Hong Kong	Martial arts (武術)	
1974.02.02	Lady Whirlwind Against the Rangers (大小遊龍)	Chang Piao	Hong Kong	Martial arts (武術)	
1974.06.28	The Godfather Squad (香港小教父)		Hong Kong	Martial arts (武術)	
1974.08.10	The Executioner (直撃！地獄拳)	Kurayamada (倉山田)	Japan	Martial arts / Ninja (武術) / (忍者)	
1974.12.07	Sister Street Fighter: Hanging by a Thread (女必殺拳 危機一発)	Shunsuke Tsubaki (椿俊輔)	Japan	Martial arts (武術)	Sister Street Fighter [2] (女必殺拳)
1974	Call Me Dragon (神龍小虎闖江湖)	Pao Chi Tao	Hong Kong	Martial arts (武術)	
1975	The Fighting Dragon (神拳飛龍)		Hong Kong	Martial arts (武術)	
1975	Prodigal Boxer 2 (傳奇方世玉)		Hong Kong	Wuxia (武俠)	Prodigal Boxer [2] (方世玉)
1975	The Golden Triangle (金三角龍虎門)	Zhang Jian (張健)	Hong Kong	Action (動作)	
1975.08.30	The Return of the Sister Street Fighter (帰ってきた女必殺拳)	Takeshi Kurosaki (黒崎剛)	Japan	Martial arts (武術)	Sister Street Fighter [3] (女必殺拳)
1976.01.31	Dragon Princess (必殺女拳士)	Masahiko Okizaki (沖崎政彦)	Japan	Martial arts (武術)	
1976.08.07	Karate vs Tiger (武闘拳 猛虎激殺！)	Tetsuji Ryūzaki (竜崎鉄次)	Japan	Martial arts (武術)	
1977	The Secret of the Shaolin Poles (方世玉大破梅花樁)	Dragon Lee	Hong Kong	Wuxia (武俠)	
1977	V.I.P. (男猛)		Hong Kong	Martial arts (武術)	
1977.12.24	The Extravagant Cops (こちら葛飾区 亀有公園前派出所)	Detective Kusano (草野刑事)	Japan	Comedy (喜劇)	G-Men '75 cast special appearance (Gメン'75のメンバーが特別出演した)
1978.02.23	Edge of Fury (撈家撈女撈上撈)	Boss Gam	Hong Kong	Action (動作)	
1978.12.30	Heroes of the East (aka Shaolin Challenges Ninja) (中華丈夫)	Sanzō Takeno (武野三藏)	Hong Kong	Martial arts / Ninja (武術) / (忍者)	
1980.05.16	Magnificent 3 (懲罰)		Hong Kong	Martial arts (武術)	
1980	Seed of Evil (孽種)		Taiwan	Crime drama (犯罪)	
1980.12.18	Innocence (情劫)		Hong Kong	Romance thriller (爱情驚悚)	
1981.03.14	Eijanaika (ええじゃないか)	Hanjirō Tsukinoki (月野木伴次郎)	Japan	Jidaigeki (時代劇)	
1981.04.02	Return of the Deadly Blade (aka Shaolin Fighters vs. Ninja) (飛刀・又見飛刀)	The Lonely Winner	Hong Kong	Wuxia / Ninja (武俠) / (忍者)	
1981	Shanghai Massacre (上海灘大爺)		Hong Kong	Martial arts (武術)	
1981	Ninja in the Deadly Trap (術士神傳)	Jūbei Toda (戸田十兵衛)	Taiwan	Wuxia / Ninja (武俠) / (忍者)	
1981.04.30	The Legend of the Owl (貓頭鷹)	Ninja master Yasuaki Kurata (忍者之師 倉田保昭)	Hong Kong	Wuxia comedy (武俠喜劇)	
1982.02.12	Legend of a Fighter (霍元甲)	Ejūrō Yamaguchi (山口江十郎)	Hong Kong	Martial arts (武術)	
1982.06.04	The Ninja Avenger (aka Impossible Woman) (飛簷走壁)	Chao's Guard	Taiwan	Martial arts / Ninja (武術) / (忍者)	
1983	Crisis (黑玫瑰)		Taiwan	Action (動作)	
1983.02.05	Aces Go Places 2 (最佳拍檔大顯神通)	Bull (牛牛)	Hong Kong	Action comedy (動作喜劇)	
1983.03.24	A Life of Ninja (亡命忍者)	Tarō Okada (岡田太郎)	Hong Kong	Martial arts / Ninja (武術) / (忍者)	
1984	The Ninja and the Thief (aka Ninja Thunderbolt) (至尊神偷)		Taiwan	Martial arts / Ninja (武術) / (忍者)	
1985.08.15	Twinkle, Twinkle Lucky Stars (夏日福星)	Japanese assassin (日本殺手)	Hong Kong	Action comedy (動作喜劇)	
1985.10.04	Mishima: A Life in Four Chapters	Takei	U.S. / Japan	Biographical drama	["Kyoko's House" segment]
1986.01.30	The Millionaires' Express (富貴列車)	Japanese ninja (日本忍者)	Hong Kong	Martial arts (武術)	
1986	A Book of Heroes (歡樂龍虎榜)	Yamashima (山島)	Taiwan	Martial arts (武術)	
1986.06.07	Lost in the Wilderness (植村直己物語)	Hirayama (平山)	Japan	Adventure (冒険)	
1986.10.17	The Seventh Curse (原振俠與衛斯理)	Captain Ho	Hong Kong	Thriller (驚悚)	
1988.07.02	Carry On Hotel (金裝大酒店)	Tomohara	Hong Kong	Comedy (喜劇)	
1987.07.09	Eastern Condors (東方禿鷹)	General's elite soldier (越南軍官)	Hong Kong	Action (動作)	
1988.08.13	Seven Days’ War (ぼくらの七日間戦争)	Atsushi Sakai (酒井敦)	Japan	Action / Drama / Comedy (アクション) / (ドラマ) / (喜劇)	
1989.11.18	Final Fight (aka Bloodfight) (ファイナルファイト 最後の一撃)	Masahiko Kai (甲斐正彦)	Japan	Martial arts (武術)	
1989	Above the War	Cook	Philippines / Japan	Vietnam War	
1991.05.31	Yakuza Side Story (静かなるドン)	Kōshirō Inokubi (猪首硬四郎)	Japan	Yakuza (ヤクザ)	Yakuza Side Story [01] (静かなるドン)
1991.07.20	Zodiac Killers (極道追蹤)	Ishikawa (石川)	Hong Kong	Drama (劇情)	
1991.11.08	Death Messenger (死神の使者)		Japan	Yakuza (ヤクザ)	
1992.01.24	Yakuza Side Story 2 (静かなるドン2)	Kōshirō Inokubi (猪首硬四郎)	Japan	Yakuza (ヤクザ)	Yakuza Side Story [02] (静かなるドン)
1992.07.24	Yakuza Side Story 3 (静かなるドン3)	Kōshirō Inokubi (猪首硬四郎)	Japan	Yakuza (ヤクザ)	Yakuza Side Story [03] (静かなるドン)
1992.09.11	The Violent Islands (暴力列島 ダーティマネージャック)		Japan	Yakuza (ヤクザ)	
1993.01.29	Yakuza Side Story 4 (静かなるドン4)	Kōshirō Inokubi (猪首硬四郎)	Japan	Yakuza (ヤクザ)	Yakuza Side Story [04] (静かなるドン)
1993.05.28	Yakuza Side Story 5 (静かなるドン5)	Kōshirō Inokubi (猪首硬四郎)	Japan	Yakuza (ヤクザ)	Yakuza Side Story [05] (静かなるドン)
1993.10.29	My Home Yakuza (となりの凡人組)	Heitarō Bonno (凡野平太郎)	Japan	Yakuza (ヤクザ)	My Home Yakuza [1] (となりの凡人組)
1993.11.13	Nakayubi-Hime Oretachadōnaru? (中指姫 俺たちゃどうなる？)		Japan	Action comedy (アクション喜劇)	
1994.01.21	Pappakapaa (パッパカパー)		Japan	Gambling comedy (博打喜劇)	Pappakapaa [1] (パッパカパー)
1994.03.11	The Fighting King (ザ・格闘王)	Munehisa Tachibana (立花宗久)	Japan	Martial arts (武術)	
1994.03.25	My Home Yakuza 2 (となりの凡人組2)	Heitarō Bonno (凡野平太郎)	Japan	Yakuza (ヤクザ)	My Home Yakuza [2] (となりの凡人組)
1994.04.21	Pappakapaa 2 (パッパカパー2)		Japan	Gambling comedy (博打喜劇)	Pappakapaa [2] (パッパカパー)
1994.07.21	Pappakapaa 3 (パッパカパー3 神様奇跡をありがとう！ 岩手水沢編)		Japan	Gambling comedy (博打喜劇)	Pappakapaa [3] (パッパカパー)
1994.09.09	My Home Yakuza 3 (となりの凡人組3)	Heitarō Bonno (凡野平太郎)	Japan	Yakuza (ヤクザ)	My Home Yakuza [3] (となりの凡人組)
1994.10.21	Pappakapaa 4 (パッパカパー4 梅は咲いたか，桜はまだか・・・ 山梨 塩山編)		Japan	Gambling comedy (博打喜劇)	Pappakapaa [4] (パッパカパー)
1994.12.22	Fist of Legend (精武英雄)	Fumio Funakoshi (船越文夫)	Hong Kong	Martial arts (武術)	Fist of Legend (精武) [1]
1995.03.24	Dark Golfer 2: The Golden Putter (闇ゴルファー2 黄金のパター)	Jōtarō Tobari (戸張丈太郎)	Japan	Gambling action (博打アクション)	
1995.07.15	Sanshiro 1-2 (1・2の三四郎)		Japan	Pro Wrestling comedy (プロレス喜劇)	
1996.02.09	Yakuza Side Story 7 (静かなるドン7)	Kōshirō Inokubi (猪首硬四郎)	Japan	Yakuza (ヤクザ)	Yakuza Side Story [07] (静かなるドン)
1996.04.26	Yakuza Side Story 8 (静かなるドン8)	Kōshirō Inokubi (猪首硬四郎)	Japan	Yakuza (ヤクザ)	Yakuza Side Story [08] (静かなるドン)
1996.08.30	Yakuza Side Story 9 (静かなるドン9)	Kōshirō Inokubi (猪首硬四郎)	Japan	Yakuza (ヤクザ)	Yakuza Side Story [09] (静かなるドン)
1996.11.29	Yakuza Side Story 10 (静かなるドン10)	Kōshirō Inokubi (猪首硬四郎)	Japan	Yakuza (ヤクザ)	Yakuza Side Story [10] (静かなるドン)
1998.07.04	Zukkoke Sannin-Gumi Kaito X Monogatari (ズッコケ三人組 怪盗X物語)	Kyokushin-kan director (極真館館長)	Japan	Family / Suspense (ファミリー) (サスペンス)	
2000.03.04	Yakuza Side Story: The Movie (静かなるドン THE MOVIE)	Kōshirō Inokubi (猪首硬四郎)	Japan	Yakuza (ヤクザ)	Yakuza Side Story The Movie (静かなるドン)
2000.07.21	Ginza Midnight Story: Eutopia (銀座ミッドナイトストーリー ゆーとぴあ)		Japan	Drama (ドラマ)	
2000.08.04	Four Investigators vs A Band of Gangsters (捜査四課対広域暴力団)		Japan	Yakuza (ヤクザ)	
2000.08.31	Conman in Tokyo (中華賭俠)	Tetsuo, the King of Gamblers in Asia (鐵男, 有亞洲賭俠之王)	Hong Kong	Gambling comedy (賭片喜劇)	
2001.01.11	Dark War (暗鬥)		Hong Kong	Triad (黑社會)	
2001.03.09	Yakuza Side Story 11 (静かなるドン11)	Kōshirō Inokubi (猪首硬四郎)	Japan	Yakuza (ヤクザ)	Yakuza Side Story [11] (静かなるドン)
2001.07.31	Yakuza Side Story 12 (静かなるドン12)	Kōshirō Inokubi (猪首硬四郎)	Japan	Yakuza (ヤクザ)	Yakuza Side Story [12] (静かなるドン)
2002.06.19	Samourais	Commissaire Fujiwara Morio	France / Spain / Germany	Martial arts	
2002.09.06	So Close (夕陽天使)	Master (師傅)	Hong Kong	Action (動作)	
2003.04.05	Yellow Dragon (黄龍 イエロードラゴン)	Gōzaburō "Gō" Azuma (東郷三郎（ゴウ）)	Japan	Martial arts (武術)	
2003.12.24	Anna in Kungfuland (安娜與武林)	Sword Shek (石劍)	Hong Kong	Martial arts (武術)	
2006.08.05	GoGo Sentai Bokenger The Movie: The Greatest Precious (轟轟戦隊ボウケンジャー THE MOVIE 最強のプレシャス)	Kōichi Akashi (明石虹一)	Japan	Tokusatsu Super Sentai (特撮 スーパー戦隊)	
2006.08.19	Master of Thunder (マスター・オブ・サンダー 決戦！！封魔龍虎伝)	Buddhist priest Santoku (三徳和尚)	Japan	Martial arts (武術)	
2006.01.07	Origin: Spirits of the Past (銀色の髪のアギト)	Producer	Japan	Animated Sci-Fi (アニメ SF)	
2009.04.02	Shinjuku Incident (新宿事件)	Tarō Watagawa (渡川太郎)	Hong Kong	Crime action (警匪動作)	
2009.05.29	Blood: The Last Vampire	Takatora Kato	Japan	Vampire / Action (吸血鬼) / (アクション)	
2010.02.19	Jiu-Jitsu (柔術)	Kobayakawa (小早川)	Japan	Martial arts (武術)	
2010.09.21	Legend of the Fist: The Return of Chen Zhen (精武風雲·陳真)	Tsuyoshi Chikaraishi (力石剛)	Hong Kong	Martial arts (武術)	Fist of Legend (精武) [2]
2011.10.24	Red Tears (レッド・ティアーズ～紅涙)	Genjirō Mishima	Japan	Vampire / Action (吸血鬼) / (アクション)	
2012.12.22	The Last Tycoon (大上海)	Major Nishino (西野少佐)	Hong Kong	Crime drama (犯罪)	
2013.09.24	The Wrath of Vajra (金剛王)	Kawao Amano (天野川雄)	China	Martial arts (武術)	
2015.06.20	Kiri - Profession: Assassin (KIRI「職業・殺し屋。」外伝)	Saburi (佐分利)	Japan	Action (アクション)	
2017.01.05	The Empty Hands (空手道)	Akira Hirakawa (平川彰)	Hong Kong	Martial arts (武術)	
2017.06.30	God of War (蕩宼風雲)	Commander Kumasawa (熊澤副將)	China	Wuxia (武俠)	
2017.11.23	The Brink (狂獸)	Blackie	Hong Kong	Crime action (警匪動作)	
2017.11.23	Manhunt (追捕)	Hideo Sakaguchi (坂口秀夫)	China / Hong Kong	Action thriller (動作驚悚)	
2018.09.20	Golden Job (黃金兄弟)	Morimoto (森本)	Hong Kong	Action (動作)	
2018.09.28	Fat Buddies (胖子行动队)	Hospital Director (醫院院长)	Hong Kong	Action comedy (動作喜劇)	
2018.11.02	Iceman: The Time Traveler (冰封俠時空行者)	Hojo Shogun (北条將軍)	China / Hong Kong	Sci-Fi / Action (科幻电影) / (動作)	
2019.10.05	BLACKFOX: Age of the Ninja	Hyōei Isurugi (石動兵衛)	Japan	Jidaigeki / Ninja (時代劇) / (忍者)	
2020	Future Fighters	Mikoto	Hong Kong	Sci-Fi / Action (科幻电影) / (動作)	

=== Television ===
Airdate	Title	Type	Role	Country	Category	Notes
1966.11.21 - 1966.11.28	Marude Dameo (丸出だめ夫)	TV series - 2 episodes...? [Ep. 38,39...?]	Judo Club Captain (柔道部のキャプテン)	Japan	Tokusatsu (特撮)	
1967.04.06	Ā Dōki Sakura (あゝ同期の桜)	TV series - 1 episode [Ep. 1]		Japan	Drama (ドラマ)	
1967.05.31	Special Tactical Police (特別機動捜査隊)	TV series - 1 episode [Ep. 292]	Member A (部員A)	Japan	Detective drama (刑事ドラマ)	
1970	Chūgakusei Gunzō (中学生群像)	TV series		Japan	Drama (ドラマ)	
1970.12.20 - 1970.12.27	Judo Straight Line (柔道一直線)	TV series - 2 episodes [Ep. 76,77]	Saburō Naruto (鳴門三郎)	Japan	Martial arts (武術)	
1971.09.12	Haru no Sakamichi (春の坂道)	TV series - 1 episode [Ep. 37]	Chin Genpin (陳元贇)	Japan	Jidaigeki (時代劇)	Taiga Drama [09] (大河ドラマ)
1974.05.11 - 1975.05.17	Birdie (バーディー大作戦)	TV series	Dragon (ドラゴン)	Japan	Detective drama (刑事ドラマ)	
1974.07.02 - 1974.12.24	Fight! Dragon (闘え！ドラゴン)	TV series - 26 episodes [All episodes]	"Dragon" Ryōma Shiranui ("竜" 不知火竜馬)	Japan	Martial arts (武術)	
1974.08.25	The Young Detective (刑事くん)	TV series - 1 episode [Ep. 42 of season 3]		Japan	Detective drama (刑事ドラマ)	
1975.05.24 - 1979.04.14	G-Men '75 (Gメン'75)	TV series	Detective Yasuaki Kusano (草野泰明刑事)	Japan	Detective drama (刑事ドラマ)	
1975.06.02	Mito Komon (水戸黄門)	TV series - 1 episode [Ep. 10 of season 6]	Eisuke Nishijima (西島英輔)	Japan	Jidaigeki (時代劇)	
1980.01.10 - 1980.08.28	Dōshin Heya Goyō-chō Shin Edo no Kaze (同心部屋御用帳 新・江戸の旋風)	TV series	Ken Tōdō (藤堂拳)	Japan	Jidaigeki (時代劇)	
1980.04.08	Shadow Warriors (服部半蔵 影の軍団)	TV series - 1 episode [Ep. 2]	Shimotsuge no Ōzaru (下柘植の大猿)	Japan	Jidaigeki / Ninja (時代劇) / (忍者)	
1980.05.11 - 1980.10.05	Sarutobi Sasuke (猿飛佐助)	TV series - 15 episodes [Ep.1-9,12-17]	Saizō Kirigakure (霧隠才蔵)	Japan	Jidaigeki / Ninja (時代劇) / (忍者)	
1980.10.25	Setouchi Satsujin Kairyū Kaeranai Onna (瀬戸内殺人海流 帰らない女)	TV movie		Japan	Mystery (ミステリ)	Saturday Wide Theater (土曜ワイド劇場)
1980.12.02	Tabigarasu Jikenchō (旅がらす事件帖)	TV series - 1 episode [Ep. 9]	Ichizō Kitami (北見市蔵)	Japan	Jidaigeki (時代劇)	
1980.12.11	Edo no Asayake (江戸の朝焼け)	TV series - 1 episode [Ep. 14]		Japan	Jidaigeki (時代劇)	
1981.08.07 - 1981.08.14	Taiyo ni Hoero!! (太陽にほえろ!)	TV series - 2 episodes [Ep. 469,470]	Inspector Sōma (相馬警部)	Japan	Detective drama (刑事ドラマ)	
1981.09.16	Tokusō Saizensen (特捜最前線)	TV series - 1 episode [Ep. 226]	Hiroshi Sawaki (沢木弘)	Japan	Detective drama (刑事ドラマ)	
1983.01.01	Kanei Command Performance (寛永御前試合)	TV movie	Seikō Ryū (Banryūken Sagawa) (龍成功（佐川幡竜軒）)	Japan	Jidaigeki (時代劇)	
1983.01.09 - 1983.12.18	Tokugawa Ieyasu (徳川家康)	TV series	Kinzō (金蔵)	Japan	Jidaigeki (時代劇)	Taiga Drama [21] (大河ドラマ)
1983.11.01	Shōnen wa Mite Ita (少年は見ていた)	TV movie		Japan	Suspense (サスペンス)	Tuesday Suspense Theater (火曜サスペンス劇場)
1983.11.12	Edo Dragnet (大江戸捜査網)	TV series - 1 episode [Ep. 621]	Shinzaburō Kuroki (黒木新三郎)	Japan	Jidaigeki (時代劇)	
1983.12.10	Youthful Detective (青春はみだし刑事)	TV series - 1 episode [Ep. 7]		Japan	Detective drama (刑事ドラマ)	
1984.01.01	Seibu Keisatsu Part III 2 Hour Special "Burning Braves" (西部警察 PART-III 2時間スペシャル「燃える勇者たち」)	TV series movie special		Japan	Detective drama (刑事ドラマ)	Seibu Keisatsu [1] (西部警察)
1984.05.25	Hissatsu Shigotonin IV (必殺仕事人IV)	TV series - 1 episode [Ep. 30]	Yaheiji (矢平次)	Japan	Jidaigeki (時代劇)	
1984.08.28	Nagareboshi Sakichi (流れ星佐吉)	TV series - 1 episode [Ep. 22]		Japan	Jidaigeki (時代劇)	
1984.10.22	Farewell Seibu Keisatsu: Daimon Dies! Men Forever... (さよなら西部警察 「大門死す! 勇者たちよ永遠に...」)	TV series movie special	Ogata (緒方)	Japan	Detective drama (刑事ドラマ)	Seibu Keisatsu [2] (西部警察)
1985.02.22	The Hangman 4 (ザ・ハングマン4)	TV series - 1 episode [Ep. 21]	Eiji Tashiro (田代英司)	Japan	Drama (ドラマ)	
1985.07.12	Mission Detective The Cop (特命刑事ザ・コップ)	TV series - 1 episode [Ep. 12]		Japan	Detective drama (刑事ドラマ)	
1985.11.30 - 1986.04.05	Fei Hua Zhu Yue (飛花逐月)	TV series	Xiaoyao Gongzi (逍遥公子)	Taiwan	Wuxia (武侠)	
1990.06.26	Top Stewardess Story (トップスチュワーデス物語)	TV series - 1 episode [Ep. 10]	Passenger (乗客)	Japan	Drama (ドラマ)	
1996.08.24 - 1996.09.28	Kingyo no Fun (金魚のフン)	TV series	Ginko's father (銀子の父)	Japan	Drama (ドラマ)	
1999.08.10 - 2000	Fist of Hero (aka Hero of Shanghai) (中華大丈夫)	TV series	Jūbei Yokoyama (横山十兵衛)	China	Martial arts (武術)	
2005	Dragon Get Angry (天煞孤星)	TV movie	Jūbei Yokoyama (横山十兵衛	Hong Kong	Martial arts (武術)	(re-edit of Fist of Hero)
2005.02.14 - 2005.03.30	The Royal Swordsmen (天下第一)	TV series - 7 episodes [Ep. 2,7-11,34]	Tajima-no-kami Yagyū (柳生但馬守)	China, Taiwan, Hong Kong	Wuxia / Ninja (武侠) / (忍者)	
2013.04.05 - 2013.09.20	Garo: The One Who Shines in the Darkness (牙狼〈GARO〉～闇を照らす者～)	TV series	Sonshi (尊士)	Japan	Tokusatsu (特撮)	
2017.04.03 - 2017.09.29	Yasuragi no Sato (やすらぎの郷)	TV series	Jūsaburō Nasu (那須十三郎)	Japan	Drama (ドラマ)	Yasuragi [1] (やすらぎ)
2018.05.15 - 2018.06.25	The Great Adventurer Wesley: Mind Port (冒险王卫斯理之无名发)	TV series	Ryūta Fujiwara (藤原龍太)	China	Sci-Fi (科幻电影)	
2019.04.08 - 2020.03.__	Yasuragi no Toki - Michi (やすらぎの刻〜道)	TV series	Jūsaburō Nasu (那須十三郎)	Japan	Drama (ドラマ)	Yasuragi [2] (やすらぎ)
2021.08.18	Pandora's Box 2021 (天目危机)	TV series	Hei Muhong (Not Yet Known)	China	Detective Drama (刑事剧集)	

=== Other ===
Year	Title	Type	Role	Country	Category	Notes
2011.06.07 - 2011.06.15	Tweeting Sanshiro, Win One...Now (つぶやき三四郎 〜一本なう〜)	Mobile content (6 episodes)	Jigorō Kuruma (車治五郎)	Japan	Martial arts (武術)	
