= Duel of Fists =

1971 Hong Kong film by Chang Cheh

- The Hong Kong movie poster.
- Directed by: Chang Cheh
- Written by: Ni Kuang
- Produced by: Run Run Shaw
- Starring: David Chiang; Ti Lung
- Cinematography: Kung Mu-To
- Edited by: Kwok Ting-Hung
- Music by: Frankie Chan
- Distributed by: Shaw Brothers Studio
- Release date: 1 October 1971 (Hong Kong)
- Running time: 102 minutes
- Country: Hong Kong
- Languages: Mandarin; Thai

Duel of Fists (Chinese: 拳擊; Quan Ji or Kuen gik) is a 1971 Hong Kong martial arts film directed by Chang Cheh and starring David Chiang and Ti Lung. Filmed on location in Bangkok, the story concerns a Hong Kong engineer (Chiang) who goes to Thailand to find his long-lost half-brother (Ti Lung), who is a Muay Thai boxer. For its 1973 UK release, the film was retitled The Chinese Connection and is often confused with the Bruce Lee film Fist of Fury, which was also known in some areas as The Chinese Connection.

== Plot ==
Fan Ko, an engineering architect in Hong Kong who is also highly skilled in martial arts, is called to the bedside of his dying father, who reveals that he long ago had an affair with a woman in Thailand, who bore him a son. He begs Fan Ko to go to Thailand and find the young man, and shows him an old photo, taken when the brother was perhaps 10 years old. But even then, the fierce-looking boy was training in the Thai martial art, Muay Thai, and sported a tattoo on his left arm of a ship's anchor and a swallow flying underneath.

So Fan Ko catches a Cathay Pacific flight to Bangkok Airport and is met by a family friend and booked into a room at the Dusit Thani Hotel. Leaving behind the suit-and-tie of his job, he's dressed in the fashions of the day.

At that moment in Thailand, it is Songkran, the Thai new year, when revelers splash water on each other.

However, at Lumphini Boxing Stadium, the atmosphere is decidedly less festive, as another young boxer has been killed in the ring by the current champion, Cannon, who is backed by the local Triad boss and a crooked fight promoter, Qiang-ren. Using tactics of intimidation and with crooked officials on their payroll, the mob keeps supplying fighters to face the brutal Cannon. Among them is Wenlie, who needs to raise money to pay for an operation for his sick mother, despite the objections of his girlfriend, Yulan.

Fan Ko, meanwhile, is nosing around at Lumpini stadium, and thinks that a fighter named Miller may be his brother after he sees a large plywood cutout of the boxer and notices the anchor-and-bird tattoo. He asks a bystander, an old fighter-turned-alcoholic, what the man's name is. "People call him 'dead man'," the old drunk says, because he's the next to face Cannon.

When Miller faces Cannon, Fan Ko tries in vain to stop the fight, and Miller is pummeled – another fighter killed in the ring. Fan Ko checks the tattoo. It's a ship's anchor alright, but the bird flying underneath is an eagle. Miller was not his brother.

By now Fan Ko has become acquainted with a young Thai woman named Mei-dai, who shows him more sights around Bangkok, including the Grand Palace. And, through his investigation around Lumpini stadium, he's met Wenlie, but he's not seen Wenlie's left arm.

Then Wenlie gets in the ring against Cannon. Fan Ko is watching the fight and sees the tattoo on Wenlie's arm – it's a ship's anchor with a swallow underneath. Wenlie is Fan Ko's brother. The fight against Cannon is a tough one, but Wenlie is a strong fighter and he comes back from a savage beating to win. Fan Ko runs up to the ringside and tells Wenlie that they are brothers.

Miller's brother Misao kills Cannon after the match, incurring the wrath of the villains. They storm Wenlie's place when he is not at home and kidnap Misao. When the brothers are ambushed, the two brothers are formidable and beat down the thugs and the main stooge. He tells them that they have kidnapped Misao, so the two brothers go to fetch him.

At the house, Misao is beaten and killed, and the two brothers face off against a large group of weapon wielding henchmen. Fan Ko takes on the goons while Wenlie faces Qiang-ren. When a henchman cuts Wenlie's arm, Fan Ke disembowels the man with his skills and the henchmen run off. Fan Ko takes on Qiang-ren and breaks the villain's leg, and the police arrive to arrest the villain.

== Cast ==
- David Chiang as Fan Ko
- Ti Lung as Wenile
- Ching Miao as Dying father
- Ku Feng as Cannon
- Ching Li as Yulan
- Pawana Chanajit (Lau Lan Ying) as Mei-Dai
- Wang Chung as Misao
- Chan Sing as Qiang-ren
- Woo Wai as Xu Qiu
- Canong Daech as Miller
- Yueng Chi-hing as Old drunken fighter
