= Blackie Ko =

- 柯受良
- Born: February 22, 1953; Yushan Island, Chekiang Province, China
- Died: December 9, 2003 (aged 50); Shanghai, China
- Occupation(s): actor, singer
- Years active: 1965-2003
- Spouse: Sung Lai Wah
- Children: Alan Ko (son); Jennifer Ko (daughter); Jacky Ko (son)
- Musical career
- Also known as: Blackie Ko Shou-liang; Blacky Ko; Sau-leung Ko; Shou-liang Ko; Kao Sau-leung; Ko Sau-leung; Ko Shou-liang; Blacky Ko Sau-leung; Blackie Cole

Chinese name
- Chinese: 柯受良
Transcriptions
Standard Mandarin
- Hanyu Pinyin: Kē Shòu Liáng

Blackie Ko (Chinese: 柯受良; pinyin: Kē Shòu Liáng) (February 22, 1953 – December 9, 2003) was a Taiwanese film director, producer, stuntman, singer and actor. Blackie was considered to be the greatest automotive stunt choreographer in Asia.

== Personal life ==
In 1956, his family moved to Taiwan during Battle of Dachen Archipelago. He married Sung Lai Wah and they have a son named Alan Ko, a daughter named Jennifer Ko, and another son named Jacky Ko. In 1997, Ko drove a car over the Hukou Waterfall on the Yellow River in Shaanxi Province to celebrate the handover of Hong Kong.

== Death ==
On December 9, 2003, Ko died of blood poisoning in Shanghai. He was 50 years old.

== Filmography ==
=== Actor ===
- Brothers (2004)
- PaPa Loves You (2004)
- Life Express (2004)
- Black Mask 2: City of Masks (2002)
- Hero of City (2001)
- City of Desire (2001)
- For Bad Boys Only (2000)
- Born to Be King (2000)
- Her Name Is Cat 2: Journey to Death (2000)
- The Legend of Speed (1999)
- The Masked Prosecutor (1999)
- Crying Heart (1999)
- Cop Abula (1999)
- Full Alert (1997)
- Rainy Dog (1997)
- Black Rose II (1997)
- Best of the Best (1996)
- Young and Dangerous 3 (1996)
- Young and Dangerous 2 (1996)
- Mahjong Dragon (1996)
- Don't Give a Damn (1995)
- Jet Li's The Enforcer (1995)
- Thunderbolt (1995)
- Asian Connection (1995)
- Gao nu yi zu (1995)
- God of Gamblers III: Back to Shanghai (1994)
- Chez 'n Ham (1993)
- Crime Story (1993)
- Invincible (1992)
- Fight Back to School II (1992)
- Rhythm of Destiny (1992)
- Alan and Eric Between Hello and Goodbye (1991)
- God of Gamblers II (1991)
- Curry and Pepper (1990)
- It Takes Two to Mingle (1990)
- Burning Sensation (1989)
- Runaway Blues (1989)
- Code of Fortune (1989)
- Hero of Tomorrow (1988)
- The Dragon Family (1988)
- The Legend of Wisely (1987)
- The Final Test (1987)
- Rosa (1986)
- In the Line of Duty (1986)
- Heart of the Dragon (1985)
- Wheels on Meals (1984)
- Pink Force Commando (1982)
- Return of the Tiger (1979)
- Silver Hermit from Shaolin Temple (1979)
- Boxer's Adventure (1979)
- The Criminal (1977)
- General Stone (1976)
- Return of the Chinese Boxer (1975)
- The Girl Named Iron Phoenix (1973)
- Kung Fu Powerhouse (1973)
- Gold Snatchers (1973)
- The Chinese Mechanic (1973)
- The Gallant (1972)
- One Armed Boxer (1971)
- The Mighty One (1971)
- Song of Orchid Island (1965)

=== Director ===
- Life Express (2004)
- Chez 'n Ham (1993)
- Hero – Beyond the Boundary of Time (1993)
- Invincible (1992)
- The Days of Being Dumb (1992)
- Curry and Pepper (1990)
- Whampoa Blues (1990)

=== Stuntman, stunt arranger, stunt designer or stunt coordinator ===
- The Trail (1993, stunt arranger, stunt coordinator)
- Dragon from Russia (1990, stunt coordinator)
- Curry and Pepper (1990, stunt designer)
- Dynamite Fighters (1987, car stunt)
- In the Line of Duty (1986, stunt coordinator)
- Yes, Madam (1985, car stunt)

=== Action director ===
- 12 Hours of Terror (1991)
- The Legend of Wisely (1987)
- Dragon of the Swords Man (1978)

=== Producer ===
- Girls in the Hood (1995)
- Chez 'n Ham (1993)
