= Pawana Chanajit =

Thai actress (1942–2012)

- ภาวนา ชนะจิต
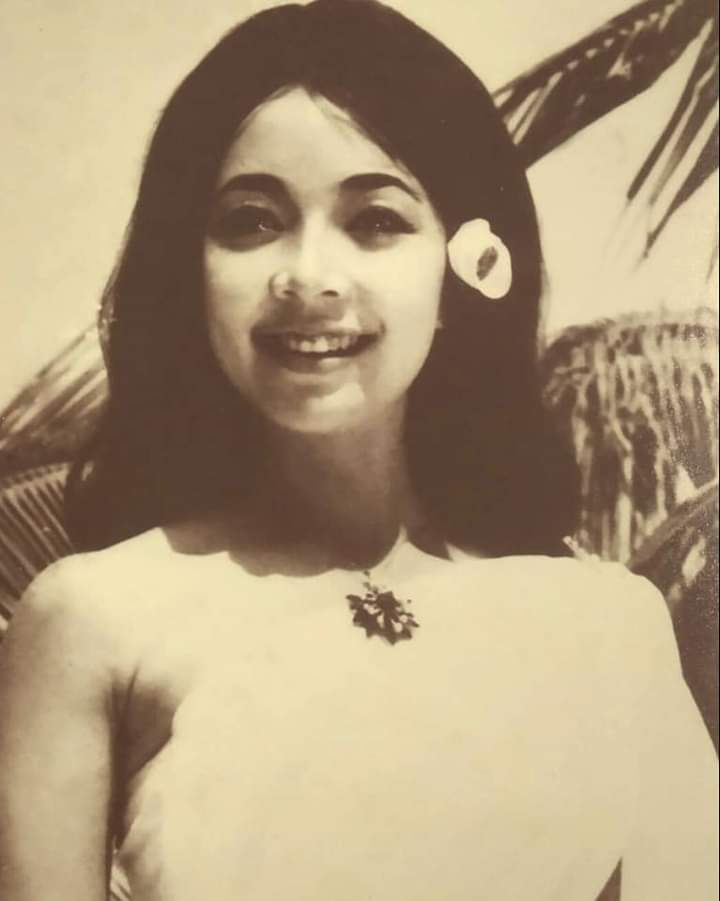
- Pawana Chanajit in 1960
- Born: Aranya Laosaengthong; December 20, 1942; Bang Yi Ruea, Thonburi, Siam
- Died: 10 September 2012 (aged 69); Nakhon Chai Si district, Nakhon Pathom, Thailand
- Other names: Parwarna Liu Lan Ying; Aranyaporn Laosaengthong
- Occupation: Actress
- Years active: 1960–1986
- Spouse: Phaichit Suphawari

Pawana Chanajit (Thai: ภาวนา ชนะจิต; RTGS: Phawana Chanachit, Chinese: 劉蘭英; December 20, 1942 – September 10, 2012) was a Thai actress known as the "Pearl of Asia".

She was born Aranyaphorn Laosaengthong (อรัญญาภรณ์ เหล่าแสงทอง) on December 20, 1942 in Bang Yi Ruea, Thonburi, Bangkok, and was of Cantonese Chinese descent. Her film career began with Saeng Soon (1960), where she starred alongside Amara Asavananda. She went on to star in dozens of Thai films. She starred in Hong Kong films, including Duel of Fists (1971) alongside David Chiang and Ti Lung. She also starred in The 6 Ultra Brothers vs. the Monster Army (1974).

Pawana Chanajit drowned in a pond at her home in Nakhon Pathom on 10 September 2012. Initially, her death was investigated as suspicious but no evidence of murder was found.

Her name has been referenced in pop culture. In the Channel 3 period drama Toong Sanaeha (2020), the female protagonist Yupin, played by Jarinporn Joonkiat, visits a hair salon and asks for a hairstyle "like Pawana Chanajit."
