= Lung Chien =

- Born: 1916
- Died: May 28, 1975 (aged 58–59); Taipei, Taiwan
- Other names: Kim Lung; Long Jian; Long Quan; Hong Chian Long
- Occupation(s): Film director, screen writer, actor
- Years active: 1950s-1970s

Chinese name
- Traditional Chinese: 劍龍
- Simplified Chinese: 剑龙
Transcriptions
Standard Mandarin
- Hanyu Pinyin: Jiàn Lóng

Lung Chien (1916 – May 28, 1975), also known by the name Kim Lung, was a prolific Chinese film director and screenwriter active between the 1950s and the 1970s.

== Career ==
Born in 1916, Lung Chien explores common themes in Hong Kong cinema such as mixed martial arts or violence in everyday life. He directed more than 30 films mostly in Taiwan and Hong Kong. He died in Taipei in 1975 at the age of 59.

== Filmography ==
=== As screenwriter ===
Year	English title	Chinese title	Director	Notes
1975	Lo Yang Bridge	Shen mo dou fa	Lung Chien	Lost

=== As director ===
- The Bridge at Lo-Yang (1975)
- Fatal Strike (1974)
- Gold Snatchers (1973)
- Kung Fu Powerhouse (1973)
- Wang Yu, King of Boxers (1973)
- The Angry Hero (1973)
- Blood of the Leopard (1972)
- Boxers of Loyalty and Righteousness (1972)
- Queen of Fist (1972)̽
- Extreme Enemy (1971)
- Struggle Karate (1971)
- Ghost Lamp (1971)
- The Bravest Revenge (1970)
- The Darkest Sword (1970)
- Golden Sword and the Blind Swordswoman (1970)
- The Ringing Sword (1969)
- Knight of the Sword (1969)
- Flying Over Grass (1969)
- Dragon Tiger Sword (1968)
- Dragon Inn (1967)
- Queen of Female Spies (1967)
- The Wandering Knight (1966)
- Malaysian Tiger (1966)

=== As actor ===
- 1956: Yun He Xun Qing Ji
- 1957: Wanhua Skeleton Incident
- 1957: Murder at Room 7, Keelung City
- 1957: Mei Ting En Chou Chi
- 1962: Five Difficult Traps
- 1963: Father Tiring Child
- 1964: Ba Mao Chuan
- 1965: Three Beautiful Blind Female Spies
- 1971: Darkest Sword
- 1973: Wang Yu, King of Boxers
- 1976: Calamity
