= The Big Fight (1972 film) =

1972 Taiwanese-Hong Kong film by Sung Ting Mei

- Directed by: Sung Ting Mei
- Release date: 1972
- Countries: Taiwan; Hong Kong
- Language: Mandarin

The Big Fight is a 1972 Mandarin-language martial arts film directed by Sung Ting Mei. The film is co-produced by Taiwan and Hong Kong.
