= Lee Sun-fung =

Chinese film director

- Chinese: 李晨風
- Born: June 1, 1909; Guangzhou city, Guangdong province, Qing Empire
- Died: May 21, 1985 (aged 75); British Hong Kong
- Other names: Lee San-Fung, Li Chenfeng, Li Chen-Feng, Li Sun-Fong, Lee Ping-Kuen
- Occupations: Film director; writer; actor
- Spouse: Yuet-ching Lee
- Relatives: Sil-hong Lee (son)

Lee Sun-fung (Chinese: 李晨風) (1 June 1909 - 21 May 1985) was a Chinese film director, writer and actor from Hong Kong.

== Early life ==
On 1 June 1909, Lee was born in Guangdong, Qing Empire.

== Career ==
Between 1940 and 1978, Lee has directed over 50 Hong Kong films. Three of his films were included in the Hong Kong Film Awards' list of "Best 100 Chinese Motion Pictures" in 2005: The Orphan (1960), Cold Nights (1955), and Feast of a Rich Family (1959), which he co-directed with Lee Tit, Ng Wui and Lo Ji-Hung. Lee is credited with over 60 films as director, over 50 films as writer, and over 15 films as actor.

== Filmography ==
=== Films ===
This is a partial list of films.

- 1941 The Metropolis
- 1955 Cold Nights (Chinese: 寒夜) - Director, writer
- 1960 The Orphan - Director
- 1972 The Loner - Director

== Personal life ==
Lee's wife is Yuet-ching Lee, an actress. Lee's third son is Sil-hong Lee. On 21 May 1985, Lee died.
