= List of martial arts films =

Following is an incomplete list of films, ordered by year of release, featuring depictions of martial arts.

== List ==
Year	Title	Martial Art/s Depicted
1925	Orochi	
1928	The Burning of the Red Lotus Temple	
1943	Sanshiro Sugata	
1944	The Fighting Seabees	
1945	Objective, Burma!	
1945	Blood on the Sun	
1945	Sanshiro Sugata Part II	
1949	The True Story of Wong Fei Hung	
1950	Rashomon	
1951	Ten Tall Men	
1954	Seven Samurai	
1954	Samurai I: Musashi Miyamoto	
1955	Samurai II: Duel at Ichijoji Temple	
1956	Samurai III: Duel at Ganryu Island	
1957	A Fantastic Tale of Naruto	
1957	Yagyu Secret Scrolls	
1961	Yojimbo	
1962	Sanjuro	
1962	The Tale of Zatoichi	
1962	The Tale of Zatoichi Continues	
1962	Harakiri	
1962	Chūshingura: Hana no Maki, Yuki no Maki	
1962	Shinobi no Mono	
1963	New Tale of Zatoichi	
1964	Three Outlaw Samurai	
1965	Sword of the Beast	
1966	Come Drink with Me	
1966	The Sword of Doom	
1966	Dragon Inn	
1967	The One-Armed Swordsman	
1967	Eleven Samurai	
1969	Return of the One-Armed Swordsman	
1970	The Chinese Boxer	
1970	Vengeance	
1971	The Big Boss (a.k.a. Fists of Fury)	
1971	Billy Jack	
1971	The Chase (a.k.a. The Shanghai Killers)	
1971	The Duel (1971 film) (a.k.a. Duel of the Iron Fist)	
1971	One Armed Boxer	
1971	A Touch of Zen	
1972	Fist of Fury (a.k.a. The Chinese Connection)	
1972	Hapkido (a.k.a. Lady Kung-fu)	Kung fu
1972	King Boxer (a.k.a. Five Fingers of Death)	
1972	Way of the Dragon	
1973	Enter the Dragon	
1973	Little Tiger of Canton	
1973	The Awaken Punch	
1973	Fist of Unicorn	
1973	Karate Kiba	
1974	Yellow Faced Tiger	
1974	Fist to Fist	
1974	Black Belt Jones	
1974	The Street Fighter series	
1974	The Legend of the 7 Golden Vampires	
1975	Goodbye Bruce Lee: His Last Game of Death	
1975	Champion of Death	
1975	Karate Bearfighter	
1975	The Super Inframan	
1975	The Valiant Ones	
1976	Exit the Dragon, Enter the Tiger	
1976	Bruce Lee Fights Back from the Grave	
1976	New Fist of Fury	
1976	Shaolin Wooden Men	
1976	Hand of Death	
1976	Killer Meteors	
1976	Dirty Ho	
1976	Master of the Flying Guillotine	
1977	The Dragon Lives Again	
1977	Doberman Cop	
1977	To Kill With Intrigue	
1977	Executioners from Shaolin	
1977	Golgo 13: Assignment Kowloon	
1977	The Invincible Armour	
1977	Karate for Life	
1978	Circle of Iron	
1978	Snake & Crane Arts of Shaolin	
1978	Magnificent Bodyguards	
1978	Snake in the Eagle's Shadow	
1978	The 36th Chamber of Shaolin	
1978	Heroes of the East	
1978	Crippled Avengers	
1978	Return of the Tiger	
1978	Way of the Dragon 2 (a.k.a. Bruce Le's Greatest Revenge)	
1978	Enter the Game of Death	
1978	Enter the Fat Dragon	
1978	Drunken Master	
1978	Spiritual Kung Fu	Kung fu
1978	Half a Loaf of Kung Fu	Kung fu
1978	Shaolin Mantis (a.k.a. The Deadly Mantis)	
1978	Five Deadly Venoms	
1978	Game of Death	
1978	Shogun's Samurai	
1978	Warriors Two	
1979	Re-Enter the Dragon	
1979	The Fearless Hyena	
1979	Snake in the Monkey's Shadow	
1979	The True Game of Death	
1979	Dragon Fist	
1979	Master With Cracked Fingers (a.k.a. Snake Fist Fighter)	
1979	Mad Monkey Kung Fu	Kung fu
1979	G.I. Samurai	
1979	Kid with the Golden Arm	
1979	Knockabout	
1979	Last Hurrah for Chivalry	
1979	Magnificent Butcher	
1979	A Force of One	
1979	Mystery of Chessboxing	
1979	Sleeping Fist	
1979	Duel of the Dragon (a.k.a. Of Cooks and Kung Fu)	
1979	Ten Tigers from Kwangtung	
1979	Bolo	Kung fu
1979	Writing Kung Fu	Kung fu
1980	Bruce's Fist of Vengeance	
1980	The Young Master	
1980	The Big Brawl	
1980	3 Evil Masters (The Master)	
1980	Clan of the White Lotus	
1980	The Octagon	
1981	Masked Avengers	
1981	The Prodigal Son	
1981	Samurai Reincarnation	
1981	Enter the Ninja	
1981	Game of Death II	
1981	Sword Stained with Royal Blood	
1981	Lovely But Deadly	
1982	Dragon Lord	
1982	Kill Squad	
1982	Legendary Weapons of China	
1982	Five Elements Ninjas	
1982	Ninja In The Dragon's Den	
1982	Raw Force	
1982	Shaolin Temple	
1983	Fearless Hyena Part II	
1983	The Eight Diagram Pole Fighter	
1983	Revenge of the Ninja	
1983	Project A	
1983	Shaolin and Wu Tang	
1983	Shaolin vs Lama	
1983	Winners and Sinners	
1983	Zu Warriors from the Magic Mountain	
1983	Legend of the Eight Samurai	
1984	Opium and the Kung-Fu Master	Kung fu
1984	Wheels on Meals	
1984	The Karate Kid	
1984	Ninja III: The Domination	
1985	Disciples of the 36th Chamber	
1985	American Ninja	
1985	Commando	
1985	Gymkata	
1985	The Last Dragon	
1985	Mr. Vampire	
1985	Police Story	
1985	Yes, Madam	
1986	No Retreat, No Surrender	
1986	Righting Wrongs (a.k.a. Above the Law)	
1986	Big Trouble in Little China	
1986	The Karate Kid Part II	
1986	The Seventh Curse	
1987	American Ninja 2: The Confrontation	
1987	A Chinese Ghost Story	
1987	Miami Connection	
1988	Dragons Forever	
1988	Above The Law	
1988	Bloodsport	Ninjutsu
1988	Tiger on the Beat	
1989	Best of the Best	
1989	Kickboxer	
1989	Cyborg	
1989	The Karate Kid Part III	
1989	Pedicab Driver	
1990	Hard to Kill	
1990	The Swordsman	
1990	The King of the Kickboxers	
1991	Once Upon a Time in China	
1991	Showdown in Little Tokyo	
1991	Out For Justice	
1991	Robin Hood: Prince of Thieves	
1991	Samurai Cop	
1991	Riki-Oh: The Story of Ricky	
1992	American Samurai	
1992	Rapid Fire	
1992	Once Upon a Time in China II	
1992	Shootfighter: Fight to the Death	
1992	Supercop (a.k.a. Police Story 3: Supercop)	
1992	A Kid From Tibet	
1992	Operation Scorpio	
1993	The Bride With White Hair	
1993	Dragon: The Bruce Lee Story	
1993	Dragon Ball Z: Bojack Unbound	
1993	Hard Target	
1993	Iron Monkey	
1993	Kung Fu Cult Master	Kung fu
1993	Ninja Scroll	
1993	Only the Strong	
1993	Once Upon a Time in China III	
1993	Last Hero in China	
1994	Drunken Master II (a.k.a. The Legend of Drunken Master)	
1994	Fist of Legend	
1994	On Deadly Ground	
1994	Wing Chun	
1994	Street Fighter: The Movie	Karate, Wu Shu, Sumo, Boxing
1994	The Next Karate Kid	
1994	Fatal Fury: The Motion Picture	
1994	Street Fighter II: The Animated Movie	
1995	Cutthroat Island	
1995	Fist of the North Star	
1995	Mortal Kombat	
1995	Rumble in the Bronx	
1995	The Blade	
1996	Barb Wire	
1996	Iron Monkey 2	
1996	Indian	
1996	The Quest	
1996	Night Hunter	
1996	Somebody Up There Likes Me	
1997	Mortal Kombat Annihilation	
1997	Drive	
1997	Once Upon a Time in China and America	
1998	Rush Hour	
1998	The Storm Riders	
1998	Who Am I?	
2000	Bichunmoo	
2000	Crouching Tiger, Hidden Dragon	
2000	The Duel	
2000	Romeo Must Die	
2000	Shanghai Noon	
2000	Versus	
2001	Aśoka	
2001	Kiss of the Dragon	
2001	Rush Hour 2	
2001	The Legend of Zu (a.k.a. Zu Warriors)	
2001	Musa (a.k.a. The Warrior)	
2001	The One	
2001	Shaolin Soccer	Shaolin kung fu
2001	Volcano High	
2002	Hero	
2002	Undisputed	Boxing
2002	Kung Pow! Enter the Fist	
2003	Kill Bill: Volume 1	
2003	Shanghai Knights	
2003	Ong-Bak: Muay Thai Warrior	
2004	Arahan	
2004	Fighting Fish	
2004	Fighter in the Wind	
2004	House of Flying Daggers	
2004	Kill Bill: Volume 2	
2004	Kill Bill: The Whole Bloody Affair	
2004	Kung Fu Hustle	Kung fu
2004	New Police Story	
2004	District 13	
2005	Duelist (a.k.a. Hyeongsa)	
2005	House of Fury	
2005	Seven Swords	
2005	The Myth	
2005	SPL: Sha Po Lang (a.k.a. Kill Zone)	
2005	Tom-Yum-Goong	
2005	Unleashed	
2006	City of Violence	
2006	Hak kuen	
2006	Fearless	
2006	The Rebel	
2006	The Restless (Korean)	
2006	Undisputed II: Last Man Standing	
2006	DOA: Dead or Alive	
2007	Flash Point	
2007	Sword of the Stranger	
2007	Muay Thai Chaiya	
2007	Rush Hour 3	
2007	The Warlords	
2007	Crows Zero	
2008	Chocolate	
2008	The Forbidden Kingdom	
2008	Ip Man	
2008	Kung Fu Panda	Kung fu
2008	Never Back Down	
2008	Ong Bak 2	
2008	Red Cliff	
2008	Redbelt	
2009	Black Dynamite	
2009	Blood and Bone	
2009	Bodyguards and Assassins	
2009	Clash	
2009	Merantau	
2009	Ninja	
2009	Ninja Assassin	
2009	Raging Phoenix	
2009	Tekken	
2009	Crows Zero 2	
2010	13 Assassins	
2010	Bangkok Knockout	
2010	Bunraku	
2010	Ip Man 2	
2010	Last Kung Fu Monk	Kung fu
2010	The Karate Kid	Karate
2010	The Legend Is Born – Ip Man	
2010	The Man from Nowhere	
2010	Ong Bak 3	
2010	Little Big Soldier	
2010	Reign of Assassins	
2010	True Legend	
2010	Undisputed III: Redemption	
2010	Yamada: The Samurai of Ayothaya	
2011	Always	
2011	Dragon	
2011	Shaolin	
2011	Kung Fu Panda 2	Kung fu
2011	The Resistance	
2011	Tekken: Blood Vengeance	
2011	Warrior	Mixed martial arts
2012	Dragon Eyes	
2012	The Man with the Iron Fists	
2012	The Raid: Redemption	Pencak silat
2012	Tai Chi 0	
2012	Wu Dang	
2012	The Girl from the Naked Eye	
2013	Police Story 2013	
2013	Commando: A One Man Army	
2013	Dragon Ball Z: Battle of Gods	
2013	The Grandmaster	
2013	Journey to the West	
2013	Man of Tai Chi	
2013	Ninja: Shadow of a Tear	
2014	Brotherhood of Blades	
2014	High Kick Angels	
2014	Kung Fu Jungle (a.k.a. Kung Fu Killer)	Kung fu
2014	The Raid 2	Pencak silat
2014	Skin Trade	
2015	Dragon Ball Z: Resurrection 'F'	
2015	Ip Man 3	
2015	Kung Fury	
2015	Wolf Warrior	
2015	The Final Master	
2016	Headshot	
2016	Kung Fu Panda 3	Kung fu
2016	The Warriors Gate	
2016	Boyka: Undisputed	
2017	Commando 2: The Black Money Trail	
2017	The Lego Ninjago Movie	
2017	Beyond Skyline	
2018	Bleeding Steel	
2018	Dragon Ball Super: Broly	
2018	The Night Comes for Us	
2018	Shadow	
2019	Furie	
2019	Junglee	
2019	John Wick: Parabellum	
2019	Ip Man 4	
2019	Triple Threat	
2019	Wira	
2019	Avengement	
2020	BuyBust	
2020	Extraction	
2020	Jiu Jitsu	
2021	Mortal Kombat	
2021	The Paper Tigers	Kung fu
2021	Snake Eyes	
2021	Raging Fire	
2021	Shang-Chi and the Legend of the Ten Rings	
2022	Everything Everywhere All at Once	
2022	Kung Fu Ghost	Kung fu
2022	Paws of Fury: The Legend of Hank	
2023	John Wick: Chapter 4	
2023	Extraction 2	
2023	Boy Kills World	
2024	Kung Fu Panda 4	Kung fu
2024	The Shadow Strays	
2024	Monkey Man	
2024	Life After Fighting	
2024	Twilight of the Warriors: Walled In	
2024	The Prosecutor	
2025	Legends of the Condor Heroes: The Gallants	
2025	Karate Kid: Legends	Karate and kung fu
2025	Ballerina	
2025	Blood Brothers: Dragon Embers	
2025	Forbidden City	

== Highest grossing films ==
The following is a list of the highest-grossing martial arts films of all time.

Teenage Mutant Ninja Turtles is the most prominent series on the list, with five of its film adaptations being included, while all the films in the Kung Fu Panda series occupy the top four. The Karate Kid Part II and The Way of the Dragon both share the 27th placement due to their box office figures having the same results. 1972, 2000, 2004, 2021, and 2024 are the most occurring release years, with three films each.

Highest grossing films
Rank	Film	Worldwide gross	Year	Ref
1	Kung Fu Panda 2	$665,692,281	2011	
2	Kung Fu Panda	$632,384,787	2008	
3	Kung Fu Panda 4	$547,946,428	2024	
4	Kung Fu Panda 3	$521,170,825	2016	
5	Teenage Mutant Ninja Turtles	$485,004,754	2014	
6	John Wick: Chapter 4	$447,142,521	2023	
7	Shang-Chi and the Legend of the Ten Rings	$432,243,292	2021	
8	Enter the Dragon	$400,000,000	1972	
9	Robin Hood: Prince of Thieves	$390,493,908	1991	
10	The Karate Kid	$359,126,022	2010	
11	Rush Hour 2	$347,325,802	2001	
12	John Wick: Chapter 3 - Parabellum	$328,349,908	2019	
13	Rush Hour 3	$258,097,122	2007	
14	Teenage Mutant Ninja Turtles: Out of the Shadows	$245,623,848	2016	
15	Rush Hour	$244,721,064	1998	
16	Journey to the West: Conquering the Demons	$215,000,000	2013	
17	Crouching Tiger, Hidden Dragon	$213,979,405	2000	
18	Raging Fire	$205,842,393	2021	
19	Teenage Mutant Ninja Turtles	$202,000,000	1990	
20	Teenage Mutant Ninja Turtles: Mutant Mayhem	$181,935,518	2023	
21	Kill Bill: Volume 1	$180,899,045	2003	
22	Hero	$177,395,557	2002	
23	Ip Man 4: The Finale	$176,345,966	2019	
24	Ip Man 3	$157,029,618	2015	
25	Kill Bill: Volume 2	$152,159,461	2004	
26	Everything Everywhere All at Once	$147,946,670	2022	
27	The Karate Kid Part II	$130,000,000	1986	
27	The Way of the Dragon	$130,000,000	1972	
29	Mortal Kombat II	$129,419,161	2026	
30	The Prosecutor	$128,154,102	2024	
31	Dragon Ball Super: Broly	$124,000,000	2018	
32	The Lego Ninjago Movie	$123,681,555	2017	
33	Mortal Kombat	$122,195,920	1995	
34	Karate Kid: Legends	$117,105,466	2025	
35	Kung Fu Hustle	$104,830,486	2004	
36	Street Fighter	$100,182,804	2026	
37	Fist of Fury	$100,000,000	1972	
38	Street Fighter	$99,433,436	1994	
39	Shanghai Noon	$99,274,467	2000	
40	Dragon Ball Super: Super Hero	$97,242,192	2022	
41	TMNT	$95,797,812	2007	
42	Police Story: Lockdown	$94,249,025	2013	
43	House of Flying Daggers	$92,863,945	2004	
44	Shadow	$91,708,374	2018	
45	The Karate Kid	$91,138,075	1984	
46	Romeo Must Die	$91,036,760	2000	
47	Wolf Warrior	$89,900,000	2015	
48	Shanghai Knights	$88,323,487	2003	
49	Twilight of the Warriors: Walled In	$87,169,200	2024	
50	Mortal Kombat	$84,426,031	2021	

== See also ==
- Combat in film
- Kalaripayattu in popular culture
- List of films featuring Wing Chun
- List of mixed martial arts films
- List of ninja films
- Martial arts film
