= Shūichi Ikeda =

Japanese actor

- 池田 秀一
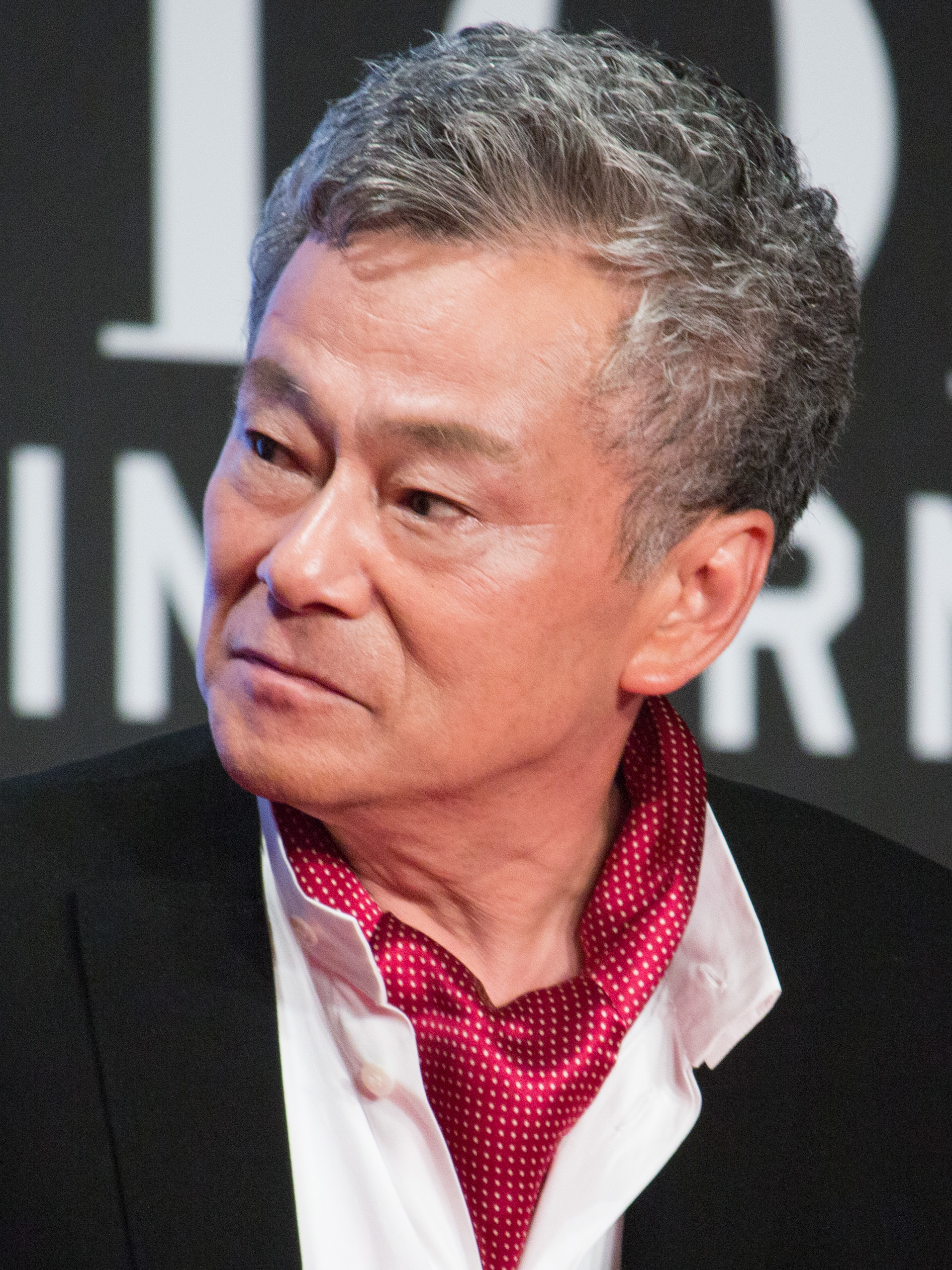
- Shūichi Ikeda at the 2015 Tokyo International Film Festival
- Born: December 2, 1949 (age 76); Tokyo, Japan
- Occupations: Actor; voice actor; narrator
- Years active: 1958–present
- Agent: Tokyo Actor's Consumer's Cooperative Society
- Height: 162 cm (5 ft 4 in)
- Spouses: Keiko Toda (1979–???); Sakiko Tamagawa

Shūichi Ikeda (Japanese: 池田 秀一, Hepburn: Ikeda Shūichi; born December 2, 1949) is a Japanese actor and narrator. Ikeda is married to Sakiko Tamagawa, although he was once married to Keiko Toda. He currently works for Tokyo Actor's Consumer's Cooperative Society. He is best known for his role as Char Aznable in multiple Gundam series, Scorpio Milo in Saint Seiya 1980s, Shuichi Akai from Detective Conan, and Red-Haired Shanks from One Piece. He is also the official Japanese dubbing roles for Jet Li. In 2023, Ikeda was a recipient of the Best Supporting Actor Award at the 17th Seiyu Awards.

== Filmography ==
=== Television animation ===
1970s

- Akaki Chi no Eleven (1970) (Shunji Hayase)
- Invincible Steel Man Daitarn 3 (1978) (Commander Radikku)
- Galaxy Express 999 (1979) (Nanmi)
- Mobile Suit Gundam (1979) (Char Aznable, Oscar Dublin)
- The Ultraman (1979) (Shimizu)

1980s

- Giant Gorg (1984) (Rod Balboa)
- Mobile Suit Zeta Gundam (1985) (Quattro Bajeena/Char Aznable)
- Machine Robo: Revenge of Cronos (1986) (Devil Rock Clay)
- Saint Seiya (1986) (Scorpio Milo)
- Zillion (1987) (Major Max Shīdo)
- Bubblegum Crisis (1987) (Brian J Mason)
- The Burning Wild Man (1988) (Gai Hidō)
- Venus Wars (1989) (Kurtz)

1990s

- City Hunter '91 (1991) (Kuwata)
- Tico of the Seven Seas (1994) (Scott Simpson)
- Rurouni Kenshin (1996) (Hiko Seijūrō XIII)
- Kindaichi Case Files (1997) (Yuuichi Yukimuro)
- Arc the Lad (1999) (Shuu)
- One Piece (1999) (Red-Haired Shanks, Dr. Ho)

2000s

- Detective Conan (2001) (Shuichi Akai)
- Project ARMS (2001) (Jabberwock)
- Gunslinger Girl (2003) (Fermi)
- Mobile Suit Gundam SEED Destiny (2004) (Gilbert Durandal)
- Monster (2004) (Martin Resuto)
- Sgt. Frog (2004) (Baio Nishizawa)
- Superior Defender Gundam Force (2004) (Commander Sazabī)
- Tenjho Tenge (2004) (Shin Natsume)
- Naruto (2005) (Sazanami/Tokichi)
- The Law of Ueki (2005) (Margarette)
- Saiunkoku Monogatari (2006) (Shouka Kou, Narrator)
- Utawarerumono (2006) (Dii)
- My Bride Is a Mermaid (2007) (younger Masa during flashback / Akeno Shiranui Brother )
- Rosario + Vampire (2008) (Kuyo)
- Sands of Destruction (2008) (Yappi)
- Golgo 13 (2008) (Mikhaïl)

2010s

- Magic Kaito (2010) (Kuroba Toichi)
- C³ (2011) (Gabriel Sekaibashi)
- Gintama (2011) (Dark Vader)
- Hunter × Hunter (2011) (Kite)
- The World is Still Beautiful (2014) (Vōdan)
- Cardfight!! Vanguard (2016) (Ryuzu Myoujin)
- Mobile Suit Gundam Unicorn RE:0096 (2016) (Full Frontal)

2020s

- One Piece (2020) (Figarland Shamrock)
- Gibiate (2020) (Dr. Yoshinaga)
- Hortensia Saga (2021) (Didier Vialdo)
- Birdie Wing: Golf Girls' Story (2022) (Leo Millafoden)
- Helck (2023) (Narrator)
- Mobile Suit Gundam GQuuuuuuX (2025) (Char Aznable (limited to the final episode))

=== OVAs ===
- Dallos (1983) (Alex)
- Dream Hunter Rem (1985) (Kaimaru Kidō)
- Leda: The Fantastic Adventure of Yohko (1985) (Zell)
- Prefectural Earth Defense Force (1986) (Chilthonian)
- Bubblegum Crisis (1987) (Brian J. Mason)
- Baoh (1989) (Dordo)
- Legend of the Galactic Heroes (1989) (Ulrich Kessler)
- Locke the Superman (1989) (Lord Leon)
- Record of Lodoss War (1990) (Lord Cashew)
- The Heroic Legend of Arslan (1993) (Hilmes)
- Future GPX Cyber Formula Cyber Formula SAGA (1996) (Kyōshirō Nagumo)
- Future GPX Cyber Formula Cyber Formula SIN (1998) (Kyōshirō Nagumo)
- Rurouni Kenshin: Tsuioku-hen (1999) (Hiko Seijūrō XIII)
- Mobile Suit Gundam Unicorn (2010) (Full Frontal)
- Mobile Suit Gundam: The Origin (2015) (Char Aznable)

=== ONAs ===
- Thermae Romae Novae (2022) (Utagawa Kuniyoshi)

=== Theatrical animation ===
- Phoenix 2772 (1980) (Rock)
- Mobile Suit Gundam (1981) (Char Aznable)
- Mobile Suit Gundam: Soldiers of Sorrow (1981) (Char Aznable)
- Mobile Suit Gundam: Encounters in Space (1982) (Char Aznable)
- Unico in the Island of Magic (1983) (Torubi)
- Project A-ko (1986) (Captain)
- Mobile Suit Gundam: Char's Counterattack (1988) (Char Aznable)
- The Heroic Legend of Arslan (1991) (Hilmes)
- Mobile Suit Zeta Gundam: A New Translation - Heirs to the Stars (2005) (Quattro Bajeena/Char Aznable)
- Mobile Suit Zeta Gundam: A New Translation II - Lovers (2005) (Quattro Bajeena/Char Aznable)
- Mobile Suit Zeta Gundam: A New Translation III - Love is the Pulse of the Stars (2006) (Quattro Bajeena/Char Aznable)
- Detective Conan: Dimensional Sniper (2014) (Shuichi Akai)
- GAMBA (2015) (Gakusha)
- Detective Conan: The Darkest Nightmare (2016) (Shuichi Akai)
- Gantz: O (2016) (Yoshikazu Suzuki)
- Detective Conan: The Scarlet Bullet (2021) (Shuichi Akai)
- Mobile Suit Gundam: Cucuruz Doan's Island (2022) (Char Aznable)
- One Piece Film: Red (2022) (Red-Haired Shanks)
- Detective Conan: Black Iron Submarine (2023) (Shuichi Akai)

=== Video games ===
- Angelique series (????) (Guardian of Green Catis)
- Another Century's Episode 2 (2006) (Char Aznable)
- Deus Ex: Human Revolution (2011) (David Sarif)
- Granblue Fantasy (2014) (The Blue Knight, Walfrid)
- Gungrave: Overdose (2004) (Garino Creale Corsione)
- Final Fantasy XIV: A Realm Reborn (2013) (Lahabrea)
- Future GPX Cyber Formula: Road to the Infinity (????) (Kyoshiro Nagumo)
- Kingdom Hearts 358/2 Days (2009) (Marluxia)
- Kingdom Hearts: Re:Chain of Memories (2007) (Marluxia)
- Makai Kingdom: Chronicles of the Sacred Tome (2005) (Seedle)
- Mobile Suit Gundam: Gundam vs. Gundam (????) (Char Aznable)
- Persona 5 (Masayoshi Shidou)
- Record of Lodoss War 2: (????) (Lord Cashew (カシュー王))
- SD Gundam G Generation World (????) (Char Aznable), (Quattro Bajeena), (Gilbert Durandal), (Full Frontal)
- Sengoku Basara 4 (2014) (Ashikaga Yoshiteru)
- Sengoku Basara 4: Sumeragi (2015) (Ashikaga Yoshiteru)
- Shadow Hearts: Covenant (2004) (Blanca)
- Shapeshifter: Makai Eiyuuden (????) (Lycos)
- Shin Megami Tensei IV: Apocalypse (2016) (Mysterious Demon)
- Super Robot Wars series (????-??) (Char Aznable, Quattro Bajeena, Full Frontal)
- The Sniper (Harry C. Spencer)
- Tech Romancer (????) (Shadow Red)
- Tengai Makyō II: Manjimaru (????) (Yomi, Isohana Houshi, Marubeni)
- Tengai Makyō III: Namida (????) (Nigi)
- Tengai Makyō: Karakuri Kakutoden (????) (Yomi)
- Valkyrie Profile 2: Silmeria (????) (Odin)
- Valkyrie Profile (????) (Odin, Barbarossa)
- Xenoblade Chronicles 2 (2017) (Aegaeon)
- Monochrome Mobius: Rights and Wrongs Forgotten (2022) (Mayacowl)
- Arknights (2023) (Friston-3)

=== Drama CD ===
- Ai no Kusabi series 1 (????) (Raoul)
- Dragon Quest IV CD theater (????) (Psaro)

=== Tokusatsu ===
- Ninpū Sentai Hurricanger (2002) (Seven Spear Sanderu (ep. 39 - 51))
- Juuken Sentai Gekiranger (2007) (Bat Li (ep. 13 - 49))
- Kaizoku Sentai Gokaiger (2011) (Sanderu Jr. (ep. 25))

=== Dubbing roles ===
- Jet Li
  - Once Upon a Time in China series (Wong Fei-hung)
  - Swordsman II (Linghu Chong)
  - Fong Sai-yuk (VHS edition) (Fong Sai-yuk)
  - Kung Fu Cult Master (VHS edition) (Chang Mo-Gei)
  - Tai Chi Master (VHS edition) (Zhang Junbao)
  - The Bodyguard from Beijing (Allan Hui Ching-yeung)
  - Fist of Legend (Chen Zhen)
  - High Risk (Kit Li)
  - Black Mask (Tsui Chik / Black Mask)
  - Dr. Wai in "The Scripture with No Words" (Chow Si-Kit / Dr. Wai)
  - Hitman (Fu)
  - Lethal Weapon 4 (2003 TV Asashi edition) (Wah Sing Ku)
  - Fearless (Huo Yuanjia)
  - War (Rogue)
  - The Forbidden Kingdom (Sun Wukong)
  - The Mummy: Tomb of the Dragon Emperor (2010 Fuji TV edition) (Qin Shi Huang)
  - The Expendables (Yin Yang)
  - Flying Swords of Dragon Gate (Zhou Huai'an)
  - The Sorcerer and the White Snake (Abott Fahai)
  - The Expendables 2 (Yin Yang)
  - Badges of Fury (Huang Fei Hong)
  - The Expendables 3 (Yin Yang)
- Charlie Sheen
  - Platoon (1989 TV Asashi edition) (Chris Taylor)
  - The Wraith (TBS edition) (Jake Kesey / The Wraith)
  - Major League (Ricky Vaughn)
  - The Rookie (David Ackerman)
  - Hot Shots! (TBS edition) (LT Sean "Topper" Harley)
  - Hot Shots! Part Deux (TBS Edition) (LT Sean "Topper" Harley)
- The 36th Chamber of Shaolin (Liu Yude / Monk San Te (Gordon Liu))
- 48 Hrs. (1985 NTV edition) (Luther Kelly (David Patrick Kelly))
- Bunraku (Killer No. 2 (Kevin McKidd))
- Casablanca (New Era Movies edition) (Rick Blaine (Humphrey Bogart))
- The Chronicles of Narnia: The Lion, the Witch and the Wardrobe (Mr. Fox (Rupert Everett))
- Copycat (1998 TV Tokyo edition) (Inspector Nicoletti (Will Patton))
- Crash (James Ballard (James Spader))
- The Crow (Eric Draven (Brandon Lee))
- Cyborg (VHS edition) (Gibson Rickenbacker (Jean-Claude Van Damme))
- Das Boot (Leutnant Werner (Herbert Grönemeyer))
- Die Another Day (2006 TV Asashi edition) (Zao (Rick Yune))
- Disciples of the 36th Chamber (San Te (Gordon Liu))
- Dolittle (Barry (Ralph Fiennes))
- Double Team (Stavros (Mickey Rourke))
- Dune: Part Two (Shaddam IV (Christopher Walken))
- ER (Sean O'Brien (Bradley Whitford))
- Fantasy Mission Force (Captain Don Wen (Jimmy Wang Yu))
- The Fast and the Furious (2005 TV Asashi edition) (Johnny Tran (Rick Yune))
- Fear and Loathing in Las Vegas (Raoul Duke (Johnny Depp))
- House of Gucci (Rodolfo Gucci (Jeremy Irons))
- Iron Man (2011 TV Asahi edition) (Tony Stark / Iron Man (Robert Downey Jr.))
- Iron Man 2 (2012 TV Asahi edition) (Tony Stark / Iron Man (Robert Downey Jr.))
- Killer Meteors (Killer Weapon (Jimmy Wang Yu))
- King Kong Lives (1988 TV Asashi edition) (Hank Mitchell (Brian Kerwin))
- Kiss the Girls (Det. Nick Ruskin (Cary Elwes))
- Ladder 49 (Mike Kennedy (John Travolta))
- Lara Croft: Tomb Raider (2005 TV Asahi edition) (Manfred Powell (Iain Glen))
- Love Story (1988 TV Tokyo edition) (Oliver Barrett IV (Ryan O'Neal))
- The Man from Hong Kong (Inspector Fang Sing Leng (Jimmy Wang Yu))
- Mars (Ed Grann (Olivier Martinez))
- The Name of the Rose (William of Baskerville (John Turturro))
- Pacific Rim (Herc Hansen (Max Martini))
- Project A Part II (Inspector Chun (David Lam))
- Red Dawn (Jed Eckert (Patrick Swayze))
- Roots (1977) (Kunta Kinte (LeVar Burton))
- Roots (2016) (Omoro Kinte (Babs Olusanmokun))
- Shiri (Yu Jong-won (Han Suk-kyu))
- Streets of Fire (Tom Cody (Michael Paré))
- The Terminator (1992 VHS edition) (Kyle Reese (Michael Biehn))
- Tower of Death (Lee Chen-kwok (Kim Tai-chung))
- Village of the Damned (Dr. Alan Chaffee (Christopher Reeve))
- Village of the Damned (1998 TV Asahi edition) (Reverend George (Mark Hamill))
- Watchmen (Adrian Veidt (Jeremy Irons))
- White Collar (Peter Burke (Tim DeKay))
- Year of the Dragon (Joey Tai (John Lone))

== Live action ==
=== Films ===
- Where Spring Comes Late (1970) (Takashi Kazami)
- Gokumontō (1977) (Ryōtaku)
- Nagasaki: In the Shadow of the Flash (2025)

=== Television dramas ===
- Shonen Tanteidan (1960–63) (Ken)
- Jirō Monogatari (1964) (Jirō)
- Ōoka Echizen (1971, 75, 82) (Kazuma, Kisuke, Denjirō)
- Tōyama no Kin-san Torimono Chō (1973) (Eiji)
- Taiyō ni Hoero! (1974, 77) (Moriyama, Miyashita)
- G-Men '75 (1976, 78, 82) (Hanai, Sawaki, Murata)
- Kashin (1977) (Terashima Chuzaburo)
- Monkey (1978)
- Ultraman Tiga (1996) (Shigeki Asamiya)
- Daimajin Kanon (2010) (Dean)
- Hana Moyu (2015) (Narrator)
