= 19th Golden Horse Awards =

Award ceremony for Chinese-language films of 1981 and 1982

- Date: October 24, 1982
- Site: Sun Yat-sen Memorial Hall, Taipei, Taiwan
- Hosted by: Terry Hu and Chiang Kuang-chao
- Organized by: Taipei Golden Horse Film Festival Executive Committee

Highlights
- Best Feature Film: The Battle for the Republic of China
- Best Director: Alex Cheung; Man on the Brink
- Best Actor: Eddie Chan; Man on the Brink
- Best Actress: Wang Ping; Tiger Killer
- Most awards: Tiger Killer (3); Man on the Brink (3); The Battle for the Republic of China (3)
- Most nominations: The Battle for the Republic of China (8)

Television in Taiwan
- Channel: CTV

The 19th Golden Horse Awards (Mandarin:第19屆金馬獎) took place on October 24, 1982, at the Sun Yat-sen Memorial Hall in Taipei, Taiwan.

== Winners and nominees ==
Winners are listed first and highlighted in boldface.

**Best Feature Film**: **The Battle for the Republic of China**; Life After Life; The Green, Green Grass of Home; Steamrolling; Portrait of a Fanatic; Man on the Brink	**Best Documentary Film**: **朱銘的斧裡乾坤**; 中國繪畫的風貌; 年; Chinese Children's Games; 金門民俗文化村
**Best Animation** -	**Best Director**: **Cheung Kwok-ming — Man on the Brink**; Peter Yung Wai-chuen — Life After Life; Hou Hsiao-hsien — The Green, Green Grass of Home
**Best Leading Actor**: **Eddie Chan — Man on the Brink**; Wang Dao — The Battle for the Republic of China; Jeem Yim — Cream Soda and Milk	**Best Leading Actress**: **Wang Ping — Tiger Killer**; Brigitte Lin — Hero vs Hero; Tien Niu — Girls' School
**Best Supporting Actor**: **Ku Feng — Tiger Killer**; Kam Hing-yin — Man on the Brink; Tie Meng-chu — The City	**Best Supporting Actress**: **Deanie Ip — Cream Soda and Milk**; Jue Sing-choi — Cream Soda and Milk; Shi An-ni — In Our Time
**Best Child Star**: **Chou Pin-chun — The Green, Green Grass of Home**; Yue Sai-gang — The Battle for the Republic of China; Cheng Chuan-wen — The Green, Green Grass of Home
