= Ma Su Chen =

- Film poster
- Directed by: Ting Shan-hsi
- Written by: Ting Shan-hsi; Chen Min Hung
- Produced by: Hsi Fan Chan (executive); Chiang Chiang Chu; Juo Han Huang; Yang Kao Sung; Chun Lu (associate)
- Starring: Nancy Yen Nan-See; Jimmy Wang Yu; Sally Chen Sha Li
- Cinematography: Yeh Ching Piao
- Edited by: Sung Ming
- Music by: Chow Leung (aka Chou Fu Liang)
- Production company: First Film Organisation
- Release date: 14 June 1972 (Taiwan)
- Running time: 78 minutes
- Country: Taiwan
- Language: Mandarin

Ma Su Chen aka Rebel Boxer or Bloody Struggle is a 1972 Taiwanese film directed and co-written by Ting Shan-hsi who also directed and wrote the film Furious Slaughter (1972). It is a martial arts film starring Nancy Yen, Jimmy Wang Yu, and Sally Chen. It is a sequel to Furious Slaughter, in which Jimmy Wang Yu also plays the lead role. It was released in Hong Kong on 14 June 1972 but in Taiwan on 30 May 1972.

Apparently, the cast mentioned in Rotten Tomatoes is based on another version of Ma Su Chen because it listed two additional stars, Richard Harrison and Hwang Jang Lee, not found in other cast lists of the same movie.

== Plot ==
Believing that her brother has been murdered, martial artist Ma Su Chen (Nancy Yen) sets out to avenge him. Ma Su Chen is also a doctor. Later in the movie, they fight together as a brother-sister team against their common enemy and defeat them.

== Cast ==
| Actor | Role | Actor | Role |
|---|---|---|---|
| Nancy Yen Nan-See | Ma Su Chen | Chui Lap | axe gang thug |
| Jimmy Wang Yu | Ma Yuen Chen | Cheung Yee-Kwai | |
| Sit Hon | Ma Yuen Chen's friend in opening scene | Lily Lau Lap-Lap | |
| Shan Mao | Chow Chun Pai's lead thug | Chiu Wing-Loi | |
| Sally Chen Sha-Li | Cheng Fei/Tai Fung | Ng Gin-Yin | |
| Chiang Nan | main Japanese fighter | Lin Kuang-Yung | |
| Tsai Hung | Yamasaki, Japanese fighter | Cheung Siu-Gwan | extra |
| Yee Yuen | Miyaki, Japanese fighter | Hau Pak-Wai | extra |
| Ma Kei | Chow Chun Pai | Ho Wai-Hung | extra |
| Lee Keung | Japanese fighter | Chin Wan-Che | extra |
| Got Siu-Bo | Paradise Club (a brothel) owner | Poon Cheung-Ming | extra |
| Yu Chung-Chiu | Ma Su Chen's Uncle | Wong Wing-Sang | extra |
| Shih Ting-Ken | Chow Chun Pai's thug | Blacky Ko Sau-Leung | extra |
| Lung Fei | Chow Chun Pai's thug | Tsang Ming-Cheong | extra |
| Woo Chau-Ping | Dr. Yu | Cheung Chung-Kwai | extra |
| Chu Fei | Chow Chun Pai's thug | Tang Chia-Chuan | extra |
| Pan Chuan-Ling | watanabe | Chow Jun | extra |
