= Island of Fire =

1990 Taiwanese-Hong Kong film by Kevin Chu

- Film poster

Chinese name
- Traditional Chinese: 火燒島
- Simplified Chinese: 火烧岛
Transcriptions
Standard Mandarin
- Hanyu Pinyin: Huǒ Shāo Dǎo
Yue: Cantonese
- Jyutping: Fo2 Siu1 Dou2
- Directed by: Kevin Chu
- Written by: Lee Fu; Yip Wan-Chiu
- Produced by: Jimmy Wang Yu; Ko Chun-hsiung
- Starring: Jackie Chan; Andy Lau; Sammo Hung; Tony Leung Ka-fai; Tou Chung-hua
- Cinematography: Chen Jung-shu; Yip Chun-wing
- Edited by: Chow Tak-yeung
- Music by: Fu Lap; Chan Chi-yuen
- Distributed by: Golden Harvest
- Release dates: 28 March 1991 (Taiwan); 1 August 1991 (Hong Kong)
- Running time: 125 minutes (Taiwan); 96 minutes (Hong Kong); 96 minutes (United States)
- Countries: Taiwan; Hong Kong
- Language: Mandarin

Island of Fire (Chinese: 火燒島) is a 1991 action film directed by Kevin Chu, and starring Jackie Chan, Andy Lau, Sammo Hung, Tony Leung Ka-fai and Tou Chung-hua. A Taiwanese-Hong Kong co-production, the film was shot in Taiwan and the Philippines in 42 days from 5 April until 17 May 1989. The film's theme song, "The Last Gunshot" (最後一槍) by Cui Jian, was written as a response to the 1989 Tiananmen Square protests and massacre in Beijing, China.

This is the third collaboration between producer Jimmy Wang Yu and Jackie Chan, With their first, collaboration being Killer Meteors in 1976, the film's producer and co-star, Jimmy Wang Yu, came to Chan's aid when the then young actor sought his help in settling a dispute with the veteran director Lo Wei. The dispute was settled by Golden Harvest paying 10 million HK dollars (2 million US dollars) to Lo Wei. Chan repaid the favor by acting in Wang's 1983 film Fantasy Mission Force.

As with both of those earlier films, recent DVD and VHS releases market Island of Fire & Jackie Chan Is the Prisoner as a Jackie Chan film, displaying an image of Chan on the cover as though the lead actor. In fact, Chan only appears in a supporting role, with Tony Leung Ka-fai as the central character.

The film was followed by a sequel, Island of Fire 2 (1997), also directed by Kevin Chu.

== Synopsis ==
In the Taiwanese version, the film begins with the execution of a prisoner inside a prison.

Wang Wei (Tony Leung Ka-fai), a police officer, witnesses the murder of his father-in-law, a police commissioner, at the hands of an assassin. When the assassin attempts to escape, he is killed by a car bomb. Wei and his partner later identify the assassin but discover that he was a felon who was apparently executed in prison several months ago. Wei decides to go undercover in the prison by assaulting a group of gang members at a bar. While inside, he is immediately suspected of being a cop and is beaten in a prison-orchestrated fight, leaving him bloodied and bruised.

Wei's fellow prisoners include Da Chui (Jackie Chan), who accidentally killed a card player while trying to raise money for an operation to save his girlfriend's life; Iron Ball (Andy Lau), who has himself thrown in jail to exact revenge for his dead brother killed by Da Chui; and Fatty (Sammo Hung), a compassionate but pathetic inmate who frequently escapes visiting his young son. Significant tension occurs when Chui and Iron Ball are part of the same block, but any attempts on Chui's life are forbidden by Lucas (Jimmy Wang Yu), a powerful warlord within the prison. This ends when Lucas is set up and killed by the prison when he and Fatty escape. Fatty attempts to escape yet again during an outdoor workday, but kills a prison guard when Fatty hits him with a police cruiser; Fatty is subsequently executed. With Lucas gone and the corruption of the guards plain to see, Wei and Chui are at risk. An attempt on Wei's life accidentally kills Wei's cellmate Charlie (Tou Chung-hua), prompting a large-scale riot in which the head guard is assaulted by Chui and eventually killed by Wei. In response, Chui, Iron Ball, and Wei are executed.

Wei suddenly awakens in an undisclosed location where the Warden greets him. The Warden says that he fakes the execution of the inmates so that he can recruit them to be part of a vigilante hit squad. Wei is dispatched along with Chui, Fatty, and Iron Ball, to an airport where a drug lord is being extradited. They kill the drug lord, but are betrayed by the Warden, like the assassin that killed Wei's father-in-law, and barely dodge a car bomb meant for them. They become surrounded in an airport tower and take a police captain hostage. Wei's partner, who was present with the police escorting the drug lord, helps Wei hijack a plane and Fatty, Chui, and Iron Ball attempt to reach the plane. Fatty, Chui, and Iron Ball are all gunned down as Wei escapes.

When the Warden returns to his home, he finds Wei waiting for him, asking for answers. The Warden explains that those who were killed by the hit squad were actually connected to the Warden; the drug lord worked with the Warden and the Commissioner was getting too close to discovering the Warden's activities. Angered, Wei threatens the Warden, but is talked down from doing anything further from his partner, who replies that everything the Warden said is on tape. The Warden is arrested and Wei returns to his life as a cop.

== Cast ==
- Jackie Chan as Da Chui / Lung (Hong Kong version) / Steve (US version)
- Andy Lau as Iron Ball / Lau / Boss Lee
- Sammo Hung as Fatty John Liu Hsi-chia
- Tony Leung Ka-fai as Wang Wei / Andy / Andrew
- Tou Chung-hua as Chiu / Charlie (as Tao Chung Hwa)
- Barry Wong as Inspector Wong
- Jimmy Wang Yu as Kui / Lucas (as Wang Yu)
- Ko Chun-hsiung as Prison Chief / Prison Superintendent
- Jack Kao as Ho Lin
- Ken Lo as Bodyguard
- Rocky Lai as Iron Ball's thug / Prisoner
- Chin Ho as Iron Ball's assistant
- Teddy Yip Wing-cho as Prisoner
- Wang An
- Yen Ru-chen
- Kao Ming
- Kang Ho
- Fang Jing
- Yuen Yi
- Wai Hung-ho
- Tou Hu
- Wang Yao
- Bang Yu
- Chien Tsao

== Versions ==
There are two different versions of this film: a 96-minute Hong Kong version and a 125-minute Taiwan version which focuses more on character development and plot detail.

== See also ==
- Andy Lau filmography
- Jackie Chan filmography
- List of Hong Kong films
- List of Taiwanese films
- Sammo Hung filmography
