= One-Armed Swordsman Against Nine Killers =

1976 Hong Kong film by Teng Hung Hsu

One Armed Swordsman Against Nine Killers
- Directed by: Teng Hung Hsu
- Written by: Jimmy Wang Yu
- Produced by: Jimmy Wang Yu
- Starring: Jimmy Wang Yu
- Release date: 1976
- Country: Hong Kong
- Language: Mandarin

One Armed Swordsman Against Nine Killers (獨臂拳王勇戰楚門九子 Aka: One Armed Against nine killers.) is a 1976 Chinese film starring Jimmy Wang Yu. Although the film stars Jimmy Wang Yu as the one-armed swordsman, it has no connection to the 1967 film One-Armed Swordsman and its sequel the 1969 film Return of the One-Armed Swordsman.

== Plot ==
Set In Ancient China, a one-armed swordsman warrior battles a gang of killers.

== Cast ==
- Jimmy Wang Yu as Liu Ching Wu / Liu Yi Su
- Lo Lieh as Shao Si Yu
- Chung Wah as Mung Sing Hung, one of the Nine Killers
- Ng Ho as Lo Hsiang Pu, one of the Nine Killers
- Lung Fei as Yen Hsi Su, one of the Nine Killers
- Chin Lung as Tai Li Wa, one of the Nine Killers
- Wong Chi-Sang as Fu Pai Su, one of the Nine Killers
- Wan Shan as Chu Lu, one of the Nine Killers
- Chen Hung-Lieh as Liu Yan, one of the Nine Killers
- Choi Sung as Tang Han, one of the Nine Killers
- Wong Wing-Sang as Mo Fei To, one of the Nine Killers
- Cho Kin as Chow Yi To / Chu Chiu-Tzu
- Ko Chun-Pang as Fortune teller
- Hsieh Hsing as Assassin
- Hau Pak-Wai as Wong Pa, the "Turtle"
- Sit Hon as Liu's servant
- Yu Heng as Dr. Poison
- Wong Gwok-Chue as Monk Hsiao Hua
- Miu Tak-San as Brothel host
- Woo Hon-Cheung as Rat
- Bao Zheng-Fang as Su Lang Lang
- Pui Tak-Wan as Assassin
- Tang Keung-Mei as Lu Hsiang-Cho "Twin"
- Tang Keung-Ying as Lu Hsiang-Chu "Twin"
