= Lion's Heart =

1972 Hong Kong film by Ting Shan-hsi

- Film poster
- Directed by: Ting Shan-hsi
- Written by: Ting Shan-hsi
- Produced by: Lui Sam-Min
- Starring: Jimmy Wang Yu; Sally Chen Sha-Li; Hon Siu; Paul Chang Chung; Suen Yuet
- Production companies: Carson Film Production Co., Ltd.
- Release date: 11 July 1972 (Taiwan)
- Running time: 89 minutes
- Country: Hong Kong
- Language: Mandarin

Lion's Heart, also known as When the Lion Roars, is a 1972 Hong Kong film directed and written by Ting Shan-hsi.

== Cast ==
- Jimmy Wang Yu
- Sally Chen Sha-Li
- Hon Siu
- Paul Chang Chung
- Suen Yuet
- Ha Faan
- Sit Hon
- Shan Mao
- Lung Fei
- Got Siu-Bo
- Poon Chuen-Ling
- Dung Gam-Woo
- Cheng Fu-Hung
- Cho Boot-Lam
- Yu Chung-Chiu
- Chang I-Fei
- Wong Hoi
- Lee Keung
- Hoh Gong
- Ho Wai-Hung
- Chan San-Yat
- Wong Wing-Sang
- Au Lap-Bo
- Cheung Siu-Gwan - Extra
- Tong Ga-Kuen - Extra
- Blackie Ko Sau-Leung - Extra
- Ma Chin-Ku - Extra
- Cheung Yee-Kwai - Extra
- Hsieh Hsing - Extra
- Chow Jun - Extra
- Tsang Ming-Cheong - Extra
- Hau Pak-Wai - Extra
- Shih Ting-Ken - Extra
