= Furious Slaughter =

1972 Hong Kong film by Ting Shan-hsi

- Film poster under the title Superdragon
- Directed by: Ting Shan-hsi
- Written by: Ting Shan-hsi
- Produced by: Wong Cheuk-hon
- Starring: Jimmy Wang Yu; Sally Chen Sha Li
- Cinematography: Yeh Ching Piao
- Edited by: Sung Ming
- Music by: Chow Leung (aka Chou Fu Liang)
- Production company: First Film Organisation
- Distributed by: In-Frame Films (US)
- Release date: 31 March 1972 (Hong Kong)
- Running time: 86 minutes
- Country: Hong Kong
- Language: Mandarin

Furious Slaughter (also known as Superdragon or The Deadly Bunch) is a 1972 Hong Kong martial arts kung fu action film. It stars Jimmy Wang Yu and is a prequel to Ma Su Chen (1972).

== Plot ==
When a martial arts expert discovers the existence of an illegal slave trade in the 1930s, he goes to great lengths to overthrow it.

== Cast ==
Sources:

- Jimmy Wang Yu as Ma Yuen Chen
- Sally Chen Sha Li as Cheng Fei/Tai Fung
- Miao Tien as croupier at Pleasure Palace
- Tien Yeh as Chow Chun Pai's thug
- Sit Hon as Ma Yuen Chen's friend
- Ma Kei as Chow Chun Pai
- Lung Fei as Chow Chun Pai's thug
- Yee Yuen as Miyaki, Japanese fighter
- Got Siu Bo as brothel (Paradise Club) owner
- Shan Mao as Chow Chun Pai's lead thug
- Lee Keung as Japanese fighter
- Chui Lap as Axe gang thug
- Poon Chuen Ling as Watanabe
- Chu Fei as Chow Chun Pai's thug
- Au Lap Bo as throws 3rd axe
- Dung Gam Woo as food stall owner
- Shih Ting Ken as Chow Chun Pai's thug
- Man Man
- Su Chen Ping
- Hsieh Hsing
- Chi Fu Chiang
- Lan Chi
- Ng Ho
- Kong Yeung
- Chang I Fei
- Ho Wai Hung
- Cheong Siu Gwan
- Hoh Gong
- Wang Han Chen
- Hong Dai Tung
- Chow Chi Kei
- Cheung Chung Kwai as extra
- Cheung Yee Kwai as extra
- Gam Man Hei as extra
- Tsang Ming Cheong as extra
- Kwan Hung as extra
- Wong Wing Sang as extra
