= Jintong =

Jintong may refer to:

- Jintong (mythology), literally "Golden Boy", a close servant of the Jade Emperor in Chinese mythology
- Jintong (881–884), a Chinese era name used by the Tang rebel Huang Chao when he declared himself the Qi emperor
- Princess Joguk (1308–1325), born Jintong, a Mongolian who married King Chungsuk of Goryeo

== See also ==
- Cliff Lok (born 1948), also known as Jin Tong 金童 (Chin Tung, Kam Tung, Kan Tung etc.), Hong Kong actor
