= The Duel (1971 film) =

1971 Hong Kong film by Chang Cheh

- Film poster

Chinese name
- Traditional Chinese: 大決鬥
- Simplified Chinese: 大决斗
Transcriptions
Standard Mandarin
- Hanyu Pinyin: Dà Jué Dòu
Yue: Cantonese
- Jyutping: Daai6 Kyut3 Dau3
- Directed by: Chang Cheh
- Screenplay by: Yau-tai On-ping
- Produced by: Runme Shaw
- Starring: Ti Lung; Wang Ping; Yue Wai; David Chiang
- Cinematography: Kung Mu-to
- Edited by: Kwok Ting-hung
- Music by: Frankie Chan
- Production company: Shaw Brothers Studio
- Distributed by: Shaw Brothers Studio
- Release date: 21 April 1971
- Running time: 105 minutes
- Country: Hong Kong
- Language: Mandarin
- Box office: HK$1,375,619.20

The Duel, also known as Duel of the Iron Fist, is a 1971 Hong Kong martial arts film directed by Chang Cheh and starring Ti Lung, Wang Ping, Yue Wai and David Chiang.

== Plot ==
Tang Ren-jie (Ti Lung) and his older brother Tang Ren-lin (Ku Feng) are triad leader Shen Tian-hung's (Yeung Chi-hing) adopted son and henchman respectively. Shen was involved in a battle against rival triad leader Liu Shou-yi (Ho Ban) where both of them were killed. Jie then takes the initiative to be the scapegoat for the crimes of his brother Lin and Gan Wen-bin (Chuen Yuen), where then he flees to Jiangnan.

However, Gan repeatedly sent murderers to harm Jie while also seizing all of Shen's properties and drives Lin away. With the help of Rambler Jiang Nan (David Chiang), Jie finally kills Gan, but the two of them also dies from their injuries.

== Cast ==
- Ti Lung as Tang Ren-jie
- Wang Ping as Hu Di
- Yue Wai as Ah Shiou
- David Chiang as Jian Nan, the Rambler
- Chuen Yuen as Gan Wen-bin
- Yeung Chi-hing as Shen Tian-hung
- Ku Feng as Tang Ren-lin
- Cheng Kang-yeh as Siao Mao
- Ha Wai as Ling Tze, Factory working Girl
- Ho Ban as Liu Shou-yi
- Wong Ching-ho as Jau Hai-shan
- Hung Lau as Shiu Li
- Lee Wah-chung as Senator Feng
- Wang Kuang-yu as Liou Song
- Lau Gong as Lin Ding-wu
- Chiu Hung as Old Jin
- Yau Ming as Siao Bao
- Lan Wei-lieh as Casino Boss
- Jason Pai as Liu Shou-yi's man
- Chin Chun as Lao Liu
- Bruce Tong as Ah San
- Liu Wai as Tattoos Chen Cheh
- Yip Po-kam as Factory working Girl
- Poon Oi-lun as Factory working Girl
- Kuo Pei as Factory working Girl
- Kuo Yi as Factory working Girl
- Chan Sing as Gan's man
- Cheng Lui as Gan's man
- Wong Chung as Gan's man
- Cliff Lok as Gan's man
- Wu Chi-chin as Gan's man
- Pao Chia-wen as Gan's man
- Yeung Pak-chan as Gan's man
- Lai Yan as Gan's man
- Yeung Chen-sing as Gan's man on train
- Wong Pau-kei as Gan's man torturing Jie
- Wong Ching as Gan's man torturing Jie
- Tang Cheung as Gan's man on train
- Yuen Woo-ping as Gan's man who turns on lights
- Wong Mei as Liu Shou-yi's guard
- Tung Coi-bo as Liu Shou-yi's guard
- Yeung Wai as Liu Shou-yi's guard
- Chan Bo as Liu Shou-yi's guard
- Chen Kuan-tai as Liu Shou-yi's guard
- Yuen Shun-yi as Liu Shou-yi's guard
- Ho Bo-sing as Liu Shou-yi's guard
- Chui Fat as Thug on street
- Law Keung as Thug on street
- Danny Chow as Thug on street
- Tang Tak-cheung as Thug on street
- Yuen Cheung-yan as Old Jin's man
- Ho Pak-kwong as Casino Clerk
- Ko Hung as Casino thug
- Lau Chung-fai as Casino thug
- Lee Siu-wai as Casino thug
- Tsang Cho-lam as Brothel Staff
- Cheung Sek-au as Brothel Staff
- Ko Chiu as Factory foreman
- Yen Shi-kwan as Killed 4 times
- Tam Ying as Pedestrian
- Ting Hon as Liu Shou-yi's man
- Cheung Chi-ping as Gan's man
- Fung Hap-so as Gan's man
- Ng Yuen-fan as Gan's man
- Chik Ngai-hung as Gan's man
- Hsu Hsia as Gan's man
- Wan Ling-kwong as Gan's man
- Fung Hak-on as Gan's man
- Chan Siu-kai as Gan's man
- Lee Chiu as Gan's man
- Tam Wing-kit as Gan's man
- Lei Lung as Gan's man
- Lo Wai as Gan's man
- Huang Ha
- Yeung Chak-lam
- Chan Sing-tong
- Lau Kar-wing

== Reception ==
=== Critical ===
The film received generally positive reviews. Glenn Heath Jr. of Slant Magazine rated the film 3.5 out of 5 stars and writes "The Duel turns in violent circles for most of its running time, but the final battle sequence gratuitously displays the film's keen attempt at political commentary." City on Fire rated the film an 8.5 out of 10 and writes "The Duel is a well-paced, action packed tale that won't disappoint. It's the perfect example of Chang Cheh’s slickness. It's also one of Ti Lung’s and David Chiang’s coolest roles together." Ian Jane of DVD Talk rated the film 4 out of 5 stars and praised its action scenes, interesting plot twists and the performances by Ti and Chiang.

=== Box office ===
The film grossed HK$1,375,619.20 at the Hong Kong box office during its theatrical run from 21 April to 6 May 1971 in Hong Kong.
