= Return of the Chinese Boxer =

1977 Hong Kong film by Jimmy Wang Yu

The Chinese Boxer
- Film poster
- Directed by: Jimmy Wang Yu
- Written by: Gu Long
- Produced by: Jimmy Wang Yu; Wu Yu-Yun
- Starring: Jimmy Wang Yu; Fei Lung; Emily Y. Chang
- Cinematography: Chiu Yao-Hu
- Edited by: Kuo Ting-Hung
- Production companies: Ching Ming Film Company; Alpha Motion Pictures
- Release date: 12 November 1977
- Running time: 98 minutes
- Country: Hong Kong
- Language: Mandarin

Return of the Chinese Boxer is a 1977 sequel to the 1970 Hong Kong film The Chinese Boxer and is directed by and stars Jimmy Wang Yu.

== Plot ==
In the time of the Ming Dynasty, a Chinese boxer returns to take revenge on a gang of Japanese ninjitsu experts. Meanwhile, a Japanese man obtains a new weapon – a six holed rifle – with which he sets out to kill Chinese martial artists.

== Cast ==
- Jimmy Wang Yu as Tsao Pai Leung
- Lung Fei as Black Crane
- Hsieh Han as Kitsu
- Emily Cheung Ying Chan as Female Ninja
- Philip Ko as Chen Liu
- Jack Long as Kun Pan So
- Blackie Ko as Thai Fighter
- Yeung Fui Yuk as Nagata
- Kam Kong as Monk Yen Feng
- Wang Yung Hsing as Flying Dagger
- Hsieh Hsing as Kin Po
- Sun Jung Chi as Chao Hsao Lung
- Lei Chun as Colonel Wei
- Ching Chi Min as Lady Fong
- Ma Chi as General To
- Chen Ti Men as Japanese Lord
