= One-Armed Boxer =

1972 Hong Kong film by Jimmy Wang Yu

- Film poster
- Traditional Chinese: 獨臂拳王
- Hanyu Pinyin: Dú bì quánwáng
- Jyutping: Duk6 bei3 kyun4 wong4
- Directed by: Jimmy Wang Yu
- Written by: Jimmy Wang Yu
- Produced by: Raymond Chow
- Starring: Jimmy Wang Yu; Tien Yeh; Tang Hsin; Lung Fei
- Cinematography: Mo Shen Ku
- Edited by: Chen Hung Min; Chang Yao Chung
- Music by: Wang Fu Ling; Wang Ping
- Distributed by: Golden Harvest Company; Media Asia Group
- Release date: 2 August 1972
- Running time: 89 minutes
- Country: Hong Kong
- Language: Mandarin Cantonese

One-Armed Boxer
- Traditional Chinese: 獨臂拳王
Transcriptions
Standard Mandarin
- Yale Romanization: Dú bì chywánwáng
- IPA: [tǔ pî tɕʰɥɛ̌nwǎŋ]
Yue: Cantonese
- Yale Romanization: Duhk bei kyùhnwòhng
- IPA: [tʊ̀k pēi kʰy̏ːnwɔ̏ːŋ]

One-Armed Boxer (獨臂拳王) is a 1972 Hong Kong wuxia film directed, written by and starring Jimmy Wang Yu. Produced by Raymond Chow, it was released in 1972 in Hong Kong and various countries, and in late 1973 in the United States under a new title, The Chinese Professionals.

The film follows Yu Tien Lung (played by Wang Yu), a skilled Chinese martial artist whose martial arts school is targeted by a gang leader. After the various mercenary martial artists hired by the gang leader destroy his school, Tien, who lost his right arm in the battle, seeks revenge by strengthening his remaining arm beyond normal human limits. To shoot scenes as a one-armed character, Wang Yu had his right arm strapped to his back.

In spite of its similar name, it has no relation to The One-Armed Swordsman, the 1967 film that made Wang Yu famous. It was followed by a 1976 sequel, Master of the Flying Guillotine, with Wang Yu reprising his role and returning as writer and director.

== Plot ==
Tien Lung, the best fighter at the Ching Te martial arts school gets into a fight with the local Hook Gang at a restaurant where Tien Lung and his friends are dining. The Hook Gang are part of a local opium-dealing and prostitution ring run by a man named Chao and are rivals of the Ching Te school. The Ching Te school is the most prominent martial arts academy in town and controls the local clothes-dyeing and brick factories. In a quick battle, Tien and his friends easily defeat the Hook gang both in the restaurant and again later in the valley where they have a battle royale.

The beaten Hook gang members return to Chao and tell him how Tien and the Ching Te school beat them for no reason. More importantly, the Hook gang lies and tells Chao that Tien had disrespected their group. This infuriates Chao enough to go to the Ching Te dojo and challenge Tien's master, Hang Tui, to a fight. Hang Tui quickly defeats Chao, leaving him even more humiliated.

Chao plans his revenge by hiring a group of mercenary martial artists from Shanghai. This group consists of two karate experts and their teacher, a Judo master, a Taekwondo expert, two Thai boxing fighters, a Yoga expert, and two mystic Tibetan lamas (who are later revealed in the sequel to be students of an Imperial Assassin). With this group, Chao easily destroys the Ching Te school and all of their businesses, leaving everyone dead except for Tien Lung who loses his right arm to Chao's Japanese professional.

After escaping the massacre at the school, Tien Lung flees and is eventually rescued by a woman named Jade and her father, who happens to be a specialist in medicine. The pair nurse Tien Lung back to health but Tien Lung is still inconsolable for his lost arm and vows revenge and begins his training to destroy anyone and everyone who stands in his way. After hearing his intentions, Jade and her father eventually offers to help Tien Lung by explaining that they are in possession of an elixir that strengthen the arms and would make any fighter very powerful, whether or not they have both arms. However, for the elixir to work, Tien Lung must destroy all the nerves in his remaining arm, which he agrees to do by singeing his arm on an open flame. After recovering from the ordeal, Tien Lung's abilities improve vastly and become strong enough for Tien to be able to demolish everything with his fist, at which point he decides to finally carry out his mission.

Tien Lung eventually returns to town and exacts his revenge on the Hook gang by first killing two of the group's professional fighters. Upon killing the Judo master, Tien Lung orders the Hook Gang's school to relay a message to tell Master Chao to meet him in the quarry for a showdown. Master Chao eventually meets with Tien Lung at the quarry but not without the experts he had hired. Tien Lung easily defeats Chao and his professionals but fights a lengthy duel with Chao's Japanese professional, in which he emerges victorious.

== Cast ==
- Jimmy Wang Yu as Yu Tien Lung, known as the One-Armed Boxer, the best student and fighter of the Ching Te martial arts school and the titular character.
- Ma Kei as Master Han Tui, the master of Ching Te martial arts school and Tien Lung's master.
- Yeh Tien as Chao Liu (Chao Lau Lu), the ruthless boss of the Hook Gang and the main antagonist of the film.
- You-Min Ko as Tien Pao, one of the top fighters in the Hook Gang and Chao Liu's main henchmen.
- Hsin Tang as Hsiao Yu ("Jade"), a chinese nurse and Tien Lung's love interest.
- Wong Fei-lung as Erh Ku Da Leung, a ruthless and feared karate champion from Okinawa, Japan and the man responsible for cutting off the arm of Yu Tien Lung.
- Yi-Kuei Chang as Ko Fu ("Cho Lo"), a lama from Tibet and the Tibertan Zen Boxing expert. He and his fellow monk, Cho Lung, are the disciples of the Fung Sheng Wu Chi (the main antagonist of Master of the Flying Guillotine).
- Su Chen Ping as Cho Lung ("Cho Fu") a lama from Tibet and the Tibertan Zen Boxing expert. He and his fellow monk, Ko Fu, are the disciples of the Fung Sheng Wu Chi (the main antagonist of Master of the Flying Guillotine).
- Blackie Ko as Mi Tsu ("Mi Sao"), a Muay Thai fighter from Thailand and one of the members of the Thai hitmen duo, along with Ni Tsai, a fellow Muay Thai fighter.
- Kuan Hung as Ni Tsai ("Nai Chai"), a Muay Thai fighter from Thailand and one of the members of the Thai hitmen duo, along with Mi Tsu, a fellow Muay Thai fighter.
- Tung Chiao Wu as Kao Chiao, a judoka and judo master from Japan.
- Shan Mao as Chin Chi Yung ("Tien Chi Yung"), a Taekwondo master from Korea.
- Chun Lin Pan as Mura Singh ("Murasingh"), a Yoga expert from India.
- Hung Tsai as Chang Ku Chuan, a karate fighter from Okinawa, Japan and one of Erh Ku's disciples.
- Yung-Sheng Wang as Pan Tien-Ching, a karate fighter from Okinawa, Japan and one of Erh Ku's disciples.

== Sequel ==
One-Armed Boxer was followed by Master of the Flying Guillotine, with Jimmy Wang Yu both directing and reprising his role as the one-armed kung fu master Tien Lung. With his arm strapped behind his back, Wang Yu had earlier portrayed the One-Armed Swordsman in two films for the Shaw Brothers Studio.

== Legacy ==
The 1999 tokusatsu film Gamera 3: Revenge of Iris was inspired by One-Armed Boxer for Gamera to sacrifice his right arm.
