= Ting Shan-hsi =

Chinese filmmaker and screenwriter

- Born: May 29, 1935; Qingdao, Republic of China
- Died: November 22, 2009 (aged 74); Taipei, Taiwan
- Other names: Ehr Yang, David Ting, Ting Shan-si, Ding Sin-saai, Ting Shang-hsi, Ting San-see, Tin Sin-se, etc.
- Education: National School of Arts (now National Taiwan University of Arts)
- Occupations: film director, screenwriter, lyricist, planner, producer, actor
- Years active: 1967–1989
- Spouse: Chang Lan (唱蘭) (m. 1966–2009)
- Children: 2
- Awards: Golden Horse Award for Best Director; 1971 The Ammunition Hunters

Chinese name
- Traditional Chinese: 丁善璽
- Simplified Chinese: 丁善玺
Transcriptions
Standard Mandarin
- Hanyu Pinyin: Dīng Shànxǐ
- Wade–Giles: Ting^{1} Shan^{4}-hsi^{3}
Yue: Cantonese
- Jyutping: Ding^{1} Sin^{6}-saai^{2}

Erh Yang
- Traditional Chinese: 爾羊
- Simplified Chinese: 尔羊
Transcriptions
Standard Mandarin
- Hanyu Pinyin: Ěr Yáng
- Wade–Giles: Êrh^{3} Yang^{2}

Ting Shan-hsi (29 May 1935 – 22 November 2009), also known by his pseudonym Erh Yang, was a Chinese filmmaker and screenwriter who directed over 50 films in Taiwan and Hong Kong, mainly in the 1970s and 1980s.

== Filmography ==
=== Film ===
Year	English title	Chinese title	Director	Writer	Notes
1966	Come Drink with Me	大醉俠		Yes	Also assistant director
1967	That Man in Chang-an	幪面大俠		Yes	
1967	King Cat	七俠五義		Yes	
1969	The Avenger	翠屏山	Yes	Yes	
1969	Like Father, Like Son	飛賊	Yes	Yes	
1969	Love Is Your Name	你的名字就是愛		Yes	
1969	Investiture of the Gods	封神榜		Yes	
1969	The Young Avengeress	十三妹		Yes	
1969	Angel of Love	愛神		Yes	
1970	Hate Me Not	像霧又像花	Yes	Yes	
1970	Don't Leave Me Alone	不要拋棄我	Yes	Yes	
1970	Prosperous of Family	三娘教子	Yes	Yes	
1970	The King and Queen	歌王歌后	Yes	Yes	
1970	Million Dollar Bride	百萬新娘	Yes	Yes	
1970	The Drinking Knight	乾坤大醉俠		Yes	
1971	The Ghost Hill	十萬金山	Yes	Yes	
1971	Husband, Wife, Maid	先生、太太、下女	Yes	Yes	
1971	A Time for Lying	說謊的丈夫	Yes		
1971	The Ammunition Hunters	落鷹峽	Yes		
1972	Lion's Heart	英雄膽	Yes	Yes	
1972	Girls of the Night	夜女郎	Yes	Yes	
1972	Showdown	天王拳	Yes	Yes	
1972	The Black Enforcer	黑強制執行		Yes	
1972	Furious Slaughter	霸王拳	Yes	Yes	
1972	The Fast Fists	大盜	Yes	Yes	
1972	Chow Ken	秋瑾	Yes	Yes	
1972	Ma Su Chen	馬素貞報兄仇	Yes	Yes	
1973	The Tormentor	剋星		Yes	
1973	Imperial Tomb Raiders	盜皇陵	Yes	Yes	
1973	Heroes of the Underground	丁一山		Yes	
1973	The Queen Bee	人盡可夫女王蜂	Yes	Yes	
1973	Knight Errant	英雄本色	Yes	Yes	
1973	The Escaper	十段高手		Yes	
1973	Flight Man	馬蘭飛人	Yes	Yes	
1973	Operation White Shirt	突破國際死亡線	Yes		
1974	Empress Dowager's Agate Vase	刁蠻鬥風騷		Yes	
1974	Everlasting Glory	英烈千秋	Yes	Yes	
1974	Blood Reincarnation	陰陽界	Yes	Yes	
1974	Well of Doom	吃人井	Yes	Yes	
1974	The Talent Girl	鬼馬小淘氣	Yes	Yes	
1974	Whiplash	虎辮子	Yes	Yes	
1975	Eight Hundred Heroes	八百壯士	Yes	Yes	
1975	My Wacky, Wacky World	大千世界	Yes	Yes	
1975	A Chilled Spring	春天裡的秋天		Yes	
1975	Hong Kong Superman	香港超人大破摧花黨	Yes	Yes	
1975	Black Alice	盲女奇緣	Yes	Yes	
1975	The Seven Coffins	驅魔女	Yes	Yes	
1976	Spy Ring Kokuryukai	黑龍會	Yes	Yes	
1976	A Queen's Ransom	鱷潭群英會	Yes	Yes	
1976	Yesterday, Today and Tomorrow	昨夜,今夜,明夜	Yes	Yes	
1976	Love in the Twilight Zone	陰陽有情天	Yes	Yes	
1977	The Eternal Love	永恆的愛	Yes	Yes	
1977	Revenge of Kung Fu Mao	大腳娘子	Yes	Yes	
1978	The Wonderful Small World	小小世界妙妙妙	Yes	Yes	
1978	Edge of Fury	撈家撈女撈上撈		Yes	
1979	The Lovely Neighbor	我愛芳鄰	Yes	Yes	
1979	No-one Can Touch Her	醉拳女刁手	Yes	Yes	
1979	Upstairs and Downstairs	樓上樓下	Yes	Yes	
1979	World of the Drunken Master	酒仙十八跌		Yes	
1980	Magnificent 72	碧血黃花	Yes	Yes	
1980	The Flying Tigers and the Kung Fu Kids	有我無敵	Yes	Yes	
1980	The Crooked Profligates	浪子名花金光黨		Yes	
1981	The Battle for the Republic of China	辛亥雙十	Yes	Yes	
1981	A Good Man Can Bend	能屈能伸大丈夫	Yes	Yes	
1982	The Hades Banquet	閻王的喜宴	Yes	Yes	
1982	Sailor's Love	行船人的愛		Yes	
1982	Diamond Fight	搏殺		Yes	
1983	Love Don't Say Goodbye	一支小雨傘		Yes	
1984	Host for a Ghost	好彩撞到你	Yes	Yes	
1985	Killing in the Nude	獻身		Yes	
1986	The Kinmen Bombs	八二三炮戰	Yes	Yes	
1986	The Story of Dr. Sun Yat-sen	國父傳	Yes	Yes	
1986	Heaven Dragon, Earth Tiger	天龍地虎	Yes	Yes	
1987	Flag of Honor	烽火佳人	Yes	Yes	
1988	The Revenge Ghost of the Tree	林投姐	Yes	Yes	
1989	Spirit Love	飛越陰陽界	Yes	Yes	
1989	Unborn Spirit	嬰靈	Yes	Yes	
1993	Magic Sword	將邪神劍	Yes		
1993	The Beheaded 1000	千人斬	Yes	Yes	
1999	Yeung Yuet Lau Story	楊月樓傳		Yes	

=== TV series ===
Year	English title	Chinese title	Director	Writer	Notes
1994	Justice Pao	包青天		Yes	
1994	Yang Naiwu and Little Cabbage	楊乃武與小白菜		Yes	
1995	Qin Shi Huang's Lover	秦始皇的情人		Yes	
1996	Dark Tales	聊齋		Yes	
1997	Legend of YungChing	江湖奇俠傳		Yes	
1999	Lord of Imprisonment	神捕		Yes	
1999	Princess Miaoshan	妙善公主		Yes	
2013	The Patriot Yue Fei	精忠岳飛		Yes	filmed after his death
