= Fist to Fist =

1973 Hong Kong film by Jimmy L. Pascual

- Directed by: Jimmy L. Pascual; John Woo (assistant)
- Written by: Jimmy L. Pascual
- Produced by: Jimmy L. Pascual
- Starring: Henry Yu Yung; Wong Chung-Shun; Lily Chen Ching; Jackie Chan
- Music by: Fu-ling Wang
- Release date: 1973
- Running time: 85 Minutes (original); 70 Minutes (US DVD)
- Country: Hong Kong
- Language: Mandarin
- Box office: 294,904 tickets (France)

Fist to Fist (Chinese title: Chu ba, UK title: Dragons of Death) (Chinese: 除霸) is a 1973 Hong Kong martial arts film directed by Filipino film producer Jimmy L. Pascual, with John Woo as an assistant director. It was released in the United States by The Cannon Group in September 1973, who re-edited it to a 70-minute runtime and released it under the title Fist of the Double K, providing the film with a new English dubbed soundtrack.

== Cast ==
- Henry Yu Yung
- Wong Chung-Shun
- Lily Chen Ching
- Jackie Chan (as Chen Yuen Lung)
- Mars
- Yuen Wah
- Danny Chow
- Brandy Yuen
- Yuen Woo Ping
- Stewart Tam Tin
- Shan Kwai
- Lee Ying

== See also ==
- Jackie Chan filmography
- List of Hong Kong films
- List of martial arts films
