= The Black Enforcer =

1972 Hong Kong film by Ho Meng Hua

- Film poster
- Directed by: Ho Meng Hua
- Screenplay by: Ting Shan-hsi
- Produced by: Run Run Shaw
- Starring: Tang Ching; Wang Ping; Tien Feng
- Cinematography: Lin Kuo-Hsiang
- Edited by: Chiang Hsing-lung
- Music by: Wang Fu-ling
- Production company: Shaw Brothers
- Distributed by: Shaw Brothers
- Release date: 28 January 1972 (Hong Kong)
- Running time: 96 minutes
- Country: Hong Kong
- Language: Mandarin

The Black Enforcer (Chinese: 黑強制執行) is a 1972 Hong Kong dramatic action film directed by Ho Meng Hua. The original Hong Kong Mandarin release title is Hei ling guan (Cantonese: Hak leng goon). It was released in Hong Kong cinemas on 28 January 1972.

== Cast ==
- Tang Ching
- Wang Ping
- Tien Feng as Kuan Yun-fei
- Jen Tsu Fang
- Ching Wan Wong
- Tung Li as Kang Hua
- Chao Hsiung
- Kwang-ho Choi
- Seong Choi as Tsao Hsing
- Erh Chun
- Ko Ching
- Lai Wen
- Cliff Lok as Chin Tung
- No Tsai
