= Tiger & Crane Fists =

1976 Hong Kong film by Jimmy Wang Yu

- Film poster under the title Savage Killers
- Directed by: Jimmy Wang Yu
- Written by: Ni Kuang
- Produced by: Wong Cheuk-hon
- Starring: Jimmy Wang Yu; Lung Fei
- Cinematography: Chuang Yan-chien
- Edited by: Marco Mak; Kwok Ting-hung
- Distributed by: Dai Yat (First Films)
- Release date: 5 August 1976
- Running time: 82 minutes
- Country: Hong Kong
- Languages: Cantonese; Mandarin

Tiger & Crane Fists
- Traditional Chinese: 虎鶴雙形
Transcriptions
Yue: Cantonese
- Jyutping: fu2 hok6 soeng1 jing4

Tiger & Crane Fists (Chinese: 虎鶴雙形) (a.k.a. Savage Killers) is a kung fu movie, starring and directed by 1970s Hong Kong star Jimmy Wang Yu. It was released in 1976.

The story concerns the Tiger and the Crane martial arts style of two schools that has been separated from each other for many years. No one can determine which technique is the best. Both organizations find they must put their differences aside and work together in order to defeat Lu Ting Chu, who is a nearly invincible lackey for Japanese occupational forces. Defeating Chu is essential to repelling the Japanese invaders.

== Cast ==
- Jimmy Wang Yu – Sing Chen
- Lau Kar-wing – Liu Kang
- Lung Fei – Lu Ting Chu
- Chan Wai-Lau – Li Fu
- Tse Ling-Ling – Hung Yin
- Ma Kei – Cheng Chi
- Lui Jun
- Sit Hon – Cameo
- Lung Fong
- Wong Wing-Sang
- Phillip Kwok Chun-Fung – Student at Crane School
- Ching Kuo-Chung – Student at Crane School
- Shih Ting-Ken – Student at Crane School
- Chi Fu-Chiang
- Ng Ho
- Lau Yau-Bun
- Yeung Fui-Yuk
- Ho Wai-Hung
- Hau Pak-Wai
- To Wai-Wo
- Lee Fat-Yuen
- Poon Cheung-Ming
- Lee Siu-Ming
- Wang Ching-Liang
- Woo Hon-Cheung
- Lui Wan-Biu
- Lam Kong
- Chan Kwok-Fat
- Fan Fung-San – Extra

== Other ==
Footage from the film was later used in the 2002 comedy movie Kung Pow! Enter the Fist, alongside new footage shot by Steve Oedekerk, who also digitally inserted himself over Wang in many scenes, to create an original plot separate from this film.
