= The Beheaded 1000 =

- DVD cover
- Directed by: Ting Shan-hsi
- Written by: Ting Shan-hsi
- Produced by: Ko Chun-hsiung; Jimmy Wang Yu
- Starring: Jimmy Wang Yu; Joey Wong; Monica Chan
- Cinematography: Chuang Yan-Chien; Yeh Ching-Piao
- Edited by: Wang Chi-yang
- Music by: Tang Siu-Lam
- Production company: Golden Sun Film Co.
- Release date: 28 June 1991 (Hong Kong)
- Running time: 102 minutes
- Country: Taiwan
- Language: Mandarin

The Beheaded 1000 (also known as The Executioner) is a 1991 Taiwanese martial arts film starring Jimmy Wang Yu, Joey Wong and Monica Chan.

== Plot ==
Ren, the royal executioner, nears his 1,000th beheading when The Eight Devilish Mortals, a criminal gang Ren beheaded years ago, returns from the afterlife seeking revenge.

== Cast ==
- Jimmy Wang Yu
- Joey Wong
- Monica Chan
