= The One-Armed Swordsman =

1967 Hong Kong film by Chang Cheh

- Hong Kong film poster
- 獨臂刀
- Directed by: Chang Cheh
- Written by: Chang Cheh; Ni Kuang
- Starring: Jimmy Wang; Lisa Chiao Chiao; Angela Pan
- Cinematography: Yuen Chang-sam; Kuang Han-lu
- Edited by: Chiang Hsing-lung
- Music by: Wang Fu-ling
- Production company: Shaw Brothers Studio
- Distributed by: Shaw Brothers Studio
- Release date: 26 July 1967 (HK)
- Running time: 117 minutes
- Country: Hong Kong
- Language: Mandarin

The One-Armed Swordsman (獨臂刀) is a 1967 Hong Kong wuxia film produced and distributed by the Shaw Brothers Studio. Directed by Chang Cheh and based on a screenplay he co-wrote with Ni Kuang, the film starred Jimmy Wang in the title role. It was the first of the new style of wuxia films emphasizing male anti-heroes, violent swordplay, and heavy bloodletting set in the Han dynasty. It was the first Hong Kong film to make HK$1 million at the local box office, propelling Wang to super stardom.

This film eventually became the first in the One-Armed Swordsman trilogy. A sequel was released in 1969 called Return of the One-Armed Swordsman, followed by The New One-Armed Swordsman in 1971, all directed by Chang Cheh. It has since achieved classic status in Hong Kong cinema. In the Hong Kong Film Award's 2005 poll, The One-Armed Swordsman was voted as the 15th best Chinese-language film.

== Synopsis ==
The Golden Sword Clan is under attack by the "Huainan Twin Evils". Fang Cheng, a servant of the clan leader Qi Rufeng, sacrifices himself to protect his master, dying together with the attackers. In gratitude, Qi Rufeng takes Fang Cheng's son, Fang Gang, as an apprentice. Although Fang Gang is highly regarded by his master, the other clan members despise him for his background. To avoid confrontation, Fang Gang leaves but runs into trouble with Qi Pei, his master's daughter. In the ensuing fight, Qi Pei cuts off Fang Gang's right arm. Fang Gang stumbles and falls off a bridge into the passing boat of Xiaoman, a peasant girl.

Xiaoman nurses Fang Gang back to health and they fall in love. However, Fang Gang feels dejected as he can no longer practise swordsmanship due to his missing arm. Reluctantly, Xiaoman gives him a half-burnt martial arts manual and a broken sword which she inherited from her late parents. Regaining confidence in himself, Fang Gang practises the skills and masters a new, one-armed style of swordplay, making him stronger than before.

Meanwhile, Qi Rufeng is planning to retire from the jianghu and intends to name one of his apprentices as his successor. Around this time, his old foes – "Long-Armed Devil" and "Smiling Tiger" – seek to use the opportunity to destroy him so they ambush and kill his apprentices. When Fang Gang learns of the plot, he has no choice but to break his promise to Xiaoman to stay out of the jianghu. En route, he defeats several enemies and shows up just in time to save Qi Rufeng. After a vicious battle, he manages to slay "Long-Armed Devil", and then turns down his master's offer to be the next leader of the Golden Sword Clan, choosing to lead a simple life with Xiaoman instead.

== Cast ==
- Jimmy Wang as Fang Gang
- Lisa Chiao Chiao as Xiaoman
- Tien Feng as Qi Rufeng
- Angela Pan as Qi Pei
- Yeung Chi-hing as the "Long-Armed Devil"
- Tang Ti as "Smiling Tiger" Zheng Tianshou
- Ku Feng as Fang Cheng
- Chen Yen-yen as Qi Rufeng's wife
- Huang Tsung-hsin as Wei Xuan
- Cheng Lei as Deng Chong
- Hsieh Yun as Lü Zhen
- Wang Kuang-yu as Pei Xun
- Chang Pei-shan as Sun Hao
- Tang Chia as Ding Peng
- Lau Kar-leung as Ba Shuang
- Fan Mei-sheng as Guo Sheng
- Wang Shih-chieh as Qin Dachuan
- Chou Hsiao-lai and Chü Nuo as the Huainan Twin Evils

== Reception ==
The film's box office success earned Chang Cheh the epithet "One Million Dollar Director", established Jimmy Wang as a star, and helped to secure the popularity of the Shaw Brothers Studio and martial arts cinema.

The modern reception of the film in Hong Kong and Taiwan is positive. At the 24th Hong Kong Film Awards various Asian film critics, filmmakers and actors voted for the top Chinese films from Hong Kong, Taiwan and China. The One-Armed Swordsman was listed at 15th place on the list. In 2011, the Taipei Golden Horse Film Festival had 122 industry professionals take part in the survey. The voters included film scholars, festival programmers, film directors, actors and producers to vote for the 100 Greatest Chinese-Language Films. The One-Armed Swordsman was listed at 73rd place on the list.

== Legacy ==
Chang Cheh directed a sequel in 1969, Return of the One-Armed Swordsman, which was also produced by the Shaw Brothers Studio with Jimmy Wang reprising his role as Fang Gang. In 1971, Chang made a third One-Armed Swordsman film for the Shaw Brothers Studio, The New One-Armed Swordsman, starring David Chiang as a different character.

The popularity of these films led to imitations by other studios and Jimmy Wang playing similar one-armed characters on several occasions, beginning with the Japanese film Zatoichi and the One-Armed Swordsman in 1971, in which he was paired with the blind swordsman Zatoichi (Shintaro Katsu). In 1971, Wang also directed and starred in One-Armed Boxer, combining elements of the One-Armed Swordsman and The Chinese Boxer films he had previously made with the Shaw Brothers Studio. In 1976, he appeared in three other films with this trope: Master of the Flying Guillotine (a sequel to One-Armed Boxer), One-Armed Swordsman Against Nine Killers and One Armed Swordsmen, which starred and was co-directed by Jimmy Wang and David Chiang, playing rival one-armed swordsmen.

In 1995, director and producer Tsui Hark created The Blade, an original story about a one-armed fighter inspired by the one-armed swordsman films of the 1960s and 1970s.

== See also ==
- Tange Sazen, a Japanese one-armed swordsman character
