= Boxers of Loyalty and Righteousness =

1970 Hong Kong film by Lung Chien

- Zhong yi men
- Directed by: Lung Chien
- Written by: Yi Hsiao
- Produced by: Wu Jung-Hua
- Starring: Jimmy Wang Yu; Pin Chiang; Chia-Lin Sun
- Release date: 1970
- Running time: 91 minutes
- Country: Hong Kong
- Languages: Cantonese; Mandarin

Boxers of Loyalty and Righteousness
- Traditional Chinese: 忠義門
- Simplified Chinese: 忠義門
Transcriptions
Standard Mandarin
- Hanyu Pinyin: Zhong yi men

Loyalty and Righteousness, also known as Shogun Saints (Chinese: 忠義門), is a 1972 Hong Kong action martial arts film directed by Lung Chien, and starring Jimmy Wang Yu.

== Plot ==
Warlord Yu Ming gained great power for himself. He was a killer, and betrayed his friend General Yip and then slaughtered his family. But the General's son escaped, and spent all the life learning martial arts, with only will to kill Yu Ming.

== Cast ==
- Jimmy Wang Yu as Yu Wang
- Pin Chiang
- Chia-Lin Sun
- Yeh Tien
- Shao-Chun Chang
- Hui-Lou Chen
- Li-Yun Chen
- Tao Chiang
- Wan-Hsi Chin
