= Kill Squad =

1982 film by Patrick G. Donahue

- Promotional release poster
- Directed by: Patrick G. Donahue
- Written by: Patrick G. Donahue
- Starring: Jean Glaudé; Cameron Mitchell
- Cinematography: Christopher W. Strattan
- Music by: Joseph Conlan
- Release date: 1982
- Language: English

Kill Squad is a 1982 American martial arts action film written and directed by Patrick G. Donahue and starring Jean Glaudé and Cameron Mitchell.

== Plot ==
After a home invasion leaves Joseph Lawrence in a wheelchair and his wife dead, Joseph asks his friend Larry to assemble the other 5 members of their old squad to help him track down the criminals. A flashback reveals that Joseph, Larry, and the five other members of the squad were held captive as prisoners of war in Vietnam. Joseph earned the loyalty of the unit by stepping on a land mine to distract the Vietnamese soldiers while the others escaped.

Since the end of the war, the members of the squad have gone their separate ways, but when Larry tells each one that Joseph needs them, they each immediately agree to help him. After they assemble and show their skills, Larry informs the team that a rival electronics company owner by the name of Dutch may be responsible for the attack on Joseph.

As the squad attempts to track down Dutch, a masked sniper keeps appearing and kills them one by one until Larry and Joseph are the only squad members left. Larry learns where Dutch is, but when confronted, Dutch is accidentally killed by one of his house guests.

Upon returning to Joseph's house, the sniper appears. Larry takes on the sniper, who is revealed to be Joseph. Joseph explains that he resents the squad for the loss of his leg to the land mine and being left behind by them, and reveals that he had planned the murder of his wife to gain control of her business and faked being paralyzed to lure the squad back for revenge.

Joseph attacks Larry with an axe but Larry dodges it, leaving the axe embedded in a fence. Larry then accidentally kicks Joseph into the axe which kills him.

== Cast ==
- Cameron Mitchell as Dutch
- Jean Glaudé as Larry Pearson
- Jeff Risk as Joseph Lawrence
- Jerry Johnson as K.C.
- Francisco Ramírez as Pete
- Bill Cambra as Alan
- Gary Fung as Tommy
- Marc Sabin as Arthur
- Alan Marcus as Jessie James
- Sean P. Donahue as Billy

== See also ==
- List of American films of 1982
- List of martial arts films
