= Cream Soda and Milk =

1981 Hong Kong film by Rachel Zen

- Chinese: 忌廉溝鲜奶; 忌廉沟鲜奶
- Directed by: Rachel Zen
- Screenplay by: Chen Fang
- Starring: Eddie Chan; Lee Yin-yin; Deanie Ip; Yim Chau-wa; Chan On-ying.
- Distributed by: Golden Fountain
- Release date: 1981
- Running time: 99 minutes
- Country: Hong Kong
- Language: Cantonese

Cream Soda and Milk (Chinese: 忌廉溝鲜奶) is a film made in Hong Kong in 1981 about the social problems and broken families of that period. The name itself is inspired by the drink cream soda with milk that was popular in the 1970s. Actress Deanie Ip won the 19th Golden Horse Awards as Best Supporting Actress.

== Plot ==
Ling's parents were separated when she was young and she went abroad with her mother. Her brother Ding spends time in the youth detention centers and prisons of Hong Kong. Ling misses her brother and when she returns to Hong Kong she seeks her boyfriend Yeung’s help to look for her brother and father. Yeung is a social worker and one day he sees a youngster who looks like Ling's brother and loves drinking cream soda and milk. Nevertheless, Ding doesn't want to meet his sister.

== Cast ==
- Eddie Chan as Sunny Yang
- Lee Yin-yin as Ting Ling
- Deannie Ip as Aunt Y
- Yim Chau-wah as Ting Tien Sheng / Ting Dong
- Chan On-ying as Mei A Hua
- Wu Fung as Ting Sung Sheng
