= Cliff Lok =

Chinese film actor and martial artist

Cliff Lok (born 11 September 1948) is a Chinese film actor and martial artist who worked in the Cinema of Hong Kong. He began his career at the Peking Opera. He starred in at least 60 films between 1966 and 2001, most of them wuxia/martial arts pictures of the late 1960s and the 1970s. Films include One-Armed Swordsman (1967), Golden Swallow (1968), Return of the One-Armed Swordsman (1969), The Wandering Swordsman (1970), King Eagle (1971), and The Black Enforcer (1972).
