= The Battle for the Republic of China =

1981 film

- Film poster
- Directed by: Ting Shan-hsi
- Written by: Ting Shan-hsi; Hsiao-Yeh
- Produced by: Mona Fong; Ming Chi
- Starring: Ti Lung; Lin Feng-Jiao; Derek Yee; Wong Yue; Ko Chun-hsiung
- Cinematography: Liao Pen-jung; Lin Wen-chin; Tsao Hui-chi
- Edited by: Wang Chi-yang
- Music by: Lo Ming-tao; Huang Mou-shan
- Production companies: Central Motion Picture Corporation; Shaw Brothers Studio
- Release date: 9 October 1981 (Hong Kong)
- Running time: 121 minutes
- Country: Taiwan
- Language: Mandarin

The Battle for the Republic of China (Chinese: 辛亥雙十) is a 1981 Taiwanese drama film directed by Ting Shan-hsi. The film was selected as the Taiwanese entry for the Best Foreign Language Film at the 55th Academy Awards, but was not accepted as a nominee. It won the Golden Horse Award for Best Feature Film in 1982.

== Cast ==
- Ti Lung as Teng Yu-Lun
- Lin Feng-Jiao as Madame Yu
- Derek Yee as Liu Fu-Chi
- Wong Yue as Yu Chi
- Ko Chun-hsiung as Sun Wu
- Don Wong as Peng Chu-Hsi

== See also ==
- List of submissions to the 55th Academy Awards for Best Foreign Language Film
- List of Taiwanese submissions for the Academy Award for Best Foreign Language Film
