= Return of the One-Armed Swordsman =

1969 Hong Kong film by Chang Cheh

- Film poster
- 獨臂刀王
- Directed by: Chang Cheh
- Written by: Chang Cheh
- Produced by: Runme Shaw
- Starring: Jimmy Wang; Lisa Chiao Chiao
- Cinematography: Kung Mu-to
- Edited by: Chiang Hsing-lung
- Music by: Wang Fu-ling
- Production company: Shaw Brothers Studio
- Distributed by: Shaw Brothers Studio
- Release date: 28 February 1969
- Running time: 101 minutes
- Country: Hong Kong
- Language: Mandarin

Return of the One-Armed Swordsman (獨臂刀王), also known as One-Armed Swordsman Return, is a 1969 Hong Kong wuxia film directed by Chang Cheh and produced by the Shaw Brothers Studio. The film is a sequel to the 1967 film The One-Armed Swordsman, with Jimmy Wang and Lisa Chiao Chiao reprising their roles. It was followed by a sequel, The New One-Armed Swordsman, in 1971.

In the film, a group of villainous swordsmen is trying to take over the jianghu by various means, including murder, hostage-taking, and blackmailing the various martial arts schools. The One-Armed Swordsman comes out of retirement to stop them.

== Synopsis ==
Fang Gang, the One-Armed Swordsman, has retired after the events of the previous film to lead a peaceful life with his wife Xiaoman. Meanwhile, a group of eight swordsmen known as the "Eight Sword Kings" emerges and challenges the various martial arts schools in a bid to dominate the jianghu. Each of the eight has a unique weapon and fighting style. Anyone who refuses to submit to them is killed by their enforcers. After capturing all the schools' masters, the "Eight Sword Kings" deliver an ultimatum to the masters' apprentices to cut off their weapon-wielding arms and surrender, or else their masters will be killed.

The schools turn to Fang for help in dealing with the "Eight Sword Kings". Initially, Fang is reluctant to get involved in jianghu matters, especially after one of the apprentices kidnaps Xiaoman to force him to come out of retirement. However, after witnessing another apprentice cutting off his arm in despair, Fang is so moved that he decides to help. He joins forces with the various schools to defeat the "Eight Sword Kings" and rescue their masters. Eventually, although the masters are saved and all the "Eight Sword Kings" are killed, many of the apprentices fall in battle. Having completed his mission, Fang retires from the jianghu again to live peacefully with Xiaoman.

== Cast ==
- Jimmy Wang as Fang Gang
- Lisa Chiao Chiao as Xiaoman
- Essie Lin as Hua Niangzi
- Tien Feng as Ling Xu
- Ku Feng as Jiao Feng
- Kang Hua as Duan Shuo
- Tong Gai as Song Wen
- Lau Kar-wing as Shi Hu
- Lau Kar-leung as Yuan Qian
- Yuen Cheung-yan as Deng Fei
- Hoh Ban as Lu Long
- Cheng Lui as Lu Tong
- Tsung Hua as Lu Da
- Fong Yau as Guan Heng
- Wu Ma as Guan Shun
- Ti Lung as Lu Hong
- Wang Kuang-yu as Lu Chun
- Chan Sing as Shan Xiong
- Cliff Lok as Mu Qing
- Yau Lung as Mu Jun
- Lau Gong as Yan Yun
- Yau San as Lei Chong
- Lee Ho as Xu Long
- Fong Yue as Ding Sheng
