= Wang Ping (Taiwanese actress) =

Taiwanese actress

- Born: 1953 (age 72–73); Kaohsiung, Taiwan (Republic of China)
- Occupation: Actress

Wang Ping, also Wang Pin, Wong Ping (Chinese: 汪萍; 1 October 1953-) is a retired Taiwanese film actress, working in the Cinema of Hong Kong. She starred in about 35 Hong Kong kung-fu movies, many under Shaw Brothers studios, in the 1970s, including The Chinese Boxer (1970), King Boxer (1972) and The Black Enforcer (1972). She appeared in the Shaw films . She did make one last appearance with a very minor role in Island of Greed (1997).
