= Fantasy Mission Force =

1983 Hong Kong film by Kevin Chu

- UK DVD cover
- Directed by: Kevin Chu
- Screenplay by: Hsin Wei
- Produced by: Chiang Wen-hsiung; Yin Shen Hsiao
- Starring: Jackie Chan; Brigitte Lin; Jimmy Wang Yu; Pearl Cheung; Adam Cheng
- Cinematography: Liao Ching-sung
- Edited by: Chiang Huang-hsiung
- Music by: David Tao
- Production company: Cheng Ming Film (Hong Kong) Co.
- Distributed by: Chiang Chiang Film (Taiwan) Co.
- Release date: 13 February 1983
- Running time: 90 minutes
- Country: Hong Kong
- Language: Mandarin

Fantasy Mission Force (Chinese: 迷你特攻隊 Pinyin: Min ni te gong-dui), also fully titled as Fantasy Mission Force: Dragon Attack is a 1983 Hong Kong horror action comedy mo lei tau film directed by Kevin Chu and starring Jackie Chan (who got top billing), Brigitte Lin, and Jimmy Wang Yu. It is although often marketed as a Jackie Chan film, but he only has a minor role as a character who is a comedic antihero.

The film is set during World War II, though it intentionally uses anachronisms such as 1970s muscle cars. Four generals of the Allies of World War II have been captured by Japanese forces. A group of misfits are tasked with rescuing the generals in exchange for a reward. They have to face cannibalistic Amazons and the jiangshi of a haunted house.

== Plot ==
Nominally set during a parody version of 1940s World War II, the film begins with a Japanese attack on an Allied military camp, which a map reveals to be somewhere in Canada. After four Allied generals, including one who introduces himself as Abraham Lincoln, are taken hostage by the Japanese troops, Lieutenant Don Wen (Jimmy Wang Yu) is called in to organize a rescue effort (rejected candidates for the job include Roger Moore's James Bond, Snake Plissken, Rocky Balboa and Karl Maka's character from the Hong Kong film Aces Go Places).

With promises of a huge reward, Don Wen rounds up a group of misfits for the job, which includes two kilt-wearing soldiers, a hobo (Old Sun), a supposed escape artist (Greased Lightning), con artist Billy, and the femme fatale Lily (Brigitte Lin), who sports knee-high red leather boots and a bazooka. En route to the Japanese base where the kidnapped generals are being held (apparently located in Luxembourg according to the film), the group encounters two small-time crooks, Sammy and Emily (Jackie Chan and Ling Chang), who follow them in hope that they will lead them to a cache of money.

As they continue on, Don Wen is seemingly killed in a surprise ambush by spear-wielding tribesmen, and soon the group is captured by a tribe of cannibalistic Amazons led by an effeminate man in a tuxedo. After obliterating the Amazon tribe the group spends the night in a haunted house full of jiangshi before reaching their goal. Once there they find the generals gone and the base littered with the dead bodies of Japanese soldiers. Before the group can figure out what has happened they are attacked by sword and axe-brandishing Japanese Nazis riding in 1970s-era muscle cars.

Here the plot takes a turn for the melodramatic as the group is wiped out one by one by a machine gun, with another killed by a sword in the buttocks. In the end, with only Sammy and Emily left standing, Don Wen arrives, executes Old Sun, one of the rescue team members, and explains that he planned the whole thing from the beginning so that his rescue team and the Japanese soldiers would kill each other off, leaving him alone to collect the reward. Aiming to silence the last witnesses, Don Wen shoots Emily and Sammy is forced to fight him one-on-one.

After a long martial arts fight scene Don Wen is defeated as Sammy detonates explosives hidden in the main building, obliterating it. The generals soon show up and demand to know why they were not rescued earlier, but all Sammy does is dismiss them with the line, "I don't know any generals. To me you look like clowns!"

The film ends with a wounded Sammy and Emily driving off together in a jeep, and the generals chasing after them.

== Cast ==
- Jackie Chan as Sammy (cameo role)
- Brigitte Lin as Lily
- Jimmy Wang Yu as Captain Don Wen
- Pearl Cheung as Emily
- Adam Cheng as Amazon Leader
- Mary Wong as Amazon Queen
- Sun Yueh as Old Sun
- David Tao as Billy
- Hui Bat-Liu as Stone
- Richard Hartzell as the Britsh General
- Fong Ching as Stone's Superior
- Frankie Kao as Grease Lightning
- Jung Fang as General
- Paul Chang as General
- Lee Kwan as General
- Dan Yang as Japanese General

== See also ==
- Jackie Chan filmography
- List of Hong Kong films
