= Killer Meteors =

1976 Hong Kong film by Lo Wei

- Theatrical poster
- Directed by: Lo Wei
- Written by: Gu Long
- Produced by: Hsu Li Hwa
- Starring: Jackie Chan; Jimmy Wang Yu; Chu Feng
- Cinematography: Chris Chen Ching-Chu; Chan Chung-Yuen
- Edited by: Kwok Ting-Hung
- Music by: Stanley Chow
- Distributed by: Lo Wei Motion Picture Company
- Release date: 21 August 1976 (Hong Kong)
- Running time: 104 minutes
- Country: Hong Kong
- Language: Mandarin

Killer Meteors, (Chinese: 風雨雙流星) (or The Killer Meteors, Jackie Chan vs. Wang Yu) is a 1976 kung fu Hong Kong action film, directed by Lo Wei.

== Cast ==
- Jimmy Wang Yu as Killer Weapon
- Jackie Chan as Immortal Meteor
- Yu-Li Lan
- Ling Lung Yu

== See also ==
- Jackie Chan filmography
- List of Hong Kong films
- List of martial arts films
