= Master of the Flying Guillotine =

1976 Hong Kong film by Jimmy Wang

- American theatrical release poster
- 獨臂拳王大破血滴子
- Directed by: Jimmy Wang
- Written by: Jimmy Wang
- Produced by: Wong Cheuk-hon
- Starring: Jimmy Wang; Kang Chin; Doris Lung; Lau Kar-wing; Philip Kwok
- Cinematography: Chiu Yao-hu
- Edited by: Kwok Ting-hung
- Music by: Frankie Chan
- Production companies: First Films; Cheng Ming Film
- Distributed by: Epoch Entertainment; Pathfinder Pictures
- Release date: 24 April 1976
- Running time: 93 minutes
- Country: Hong Kong
- Language: Mandarin

Master of the Flying Guillotine (獨臂拳王大破血滴子) is a 1976 Hong Kong wuxia film directed, written by and starring Jimmy Wang. It is a sequel to the 1972 film One-Armed Boxer, and is also known as One-Armed Boxer 2 and The One-Armed Boxer vs. the Flying Guillotine.

Wang reprises his role as Yu Tianlong, a highly-skilled one-armed Chinese martial artist. In Master of the Flying Guillotine, Yu must defend himself against various martial artists seeking to end his life–including the title character, a blind Tibetan lama who seeks revenge for two lamas killed by Yu in the first film and is a master of the deadly "flying guillotine".

Quentin Tarantino has claimed Master of the Flying Guillotine to be among his favorite films. A prequel titled Fatal Flying Guillotine was released in 1977, without Wang's involvement.

== Synopsis ==
The film concerns Wang's one-armed martial arts master being stalked by an imperial assassin, the master of two fighters (the Tibetan lamas) who were killed in the previous film. The title refers to the assassin's weapon, the "flying guillotine", which resembles a hat with a bladed rim attached to a long chain. Upon enveloping one's head, the blades cleanly decapitate the victim with a quick pull of the chain. The Boxer's adversary is the assassin Fung-sheng Wu-chi, who is blind, is an expert user of the Flying Guillotine, and relies on others to identify one-armed men, whom he then kills. When the One-Armed Boxer is invited to attend a martial arts tournament, his efforts to lie low are unsuccessful, and the assassin soon tracks him down with the help of his three subordinates competing in the tournament: a Thai boxer, a yoga master, and a kobojutsu user.

The One-Armed Boxer leaves the tournament and, using a series of traps, defeats the assassin's subordinates. Unable to directly confront the deadly assassin himself, the One-Armed Boxer devises a plan that uses misdirection. Taking advantage of the assassin's blindness by using bamboo poles as a lure, each time the blind assassin throws his weapon, it becomes snagged on one of the bamboo poles effectively removing the inner blades of the assassin's deadly weapon; however, as it still contains a jagged outer edge it is still a formidable weapon. The One-Armed Boxer then proceeds to convert a coffin-maker's shop into an elaborate trap. Once the weapon is finally destroyed, the One-Armed Boxer engages the assassin in a duel and defeats him.

== Cast ==
- Jimmy Wang as Yu Tien-lung
- Kang Chin as Fung-sheng Wu-chi
- Doris Lung as Wu Shao-tieh, a daughter of Wu Chang-sang
- Sham Chin-bo as Nai-men, the Thai boxer
- Lung Fei as Yakuma
- Wong Wing-sang as Yogi Tro Le Soung, known as Indian fighter (The film gives him the name Yogi Tro Le Soung)
- Sit Hon as the tournament referee
- Lau Kar-wing as Chang Chia-yu, known as fighter with a three-section staff
- Wong Fei-lung as One-armed boxer's student
- Yu Chung-chiu as Wu Chang-sang
- Shan Mao as bamboo cutter
- Wang Tai-lang as Ma Wu-kung, Monkey stylist
- Shih Ting-ken as One-armed boxer's student
- Lung Sai-ga as Wang Jiang
- Philip Kwok as Ho Po-wei
- Lung Fong as Lee Kun-man, known as Tiger Fists / Nose-Picking fight
- Sun Jung-chi as Daredevil Lee San
- Wong Lik as Tornado Knives Lei Kung
- Hau Pak-wai as Cheung Shung, known as fighter with a long braid
- Ho Wai-hung as Tieh Cheng
- Chi Fu-Chiang as Iron Skin Niu Sze
- Ma Chin-Ku as So Leong
- Chin Lung as Flying Rope Chao Wu
- Tang Tak-Cheung as Tung Erh, known as Praying Mantis
- Hsieh Hsing as One Armed Snake Fist Hsieh Hsing

== Reception ==
Rotten Tomatoes, a review aggregator, reports that 90% of 20 surveyed critics gave the film a positive review; the average rating was 6.9/10. Metacritic rated the film 57/100 based on eleven reviews. Elvis Mitchell of The New York Times called it "near-great" and "a venerable example of the kung fu genre". Kevin Thomas of the Los Angeles Times wrote, "Master of the Flying Guillotine has been called the Holy Grail of the Hong Kong martial arts movies of the '70s, and now that it has been lovingly restored and given a regular theatrical release, it's easy to see why." Joey O'Bryan of The Austin Chronicle rated it 2/5 stars and called it "a mess" that fails to live up to the epic brawl promised by the alternate title. Nathan Rabin of The A.V. Club called it "a delirious kung-fu saga" that is "wild even by the genre's lenient standards". Rabin concludes, "Goofy Z-movie fun of the highest order, Master Of The Flying Guillotine needs to be seen to be believed, and even then defies belief." Phil Hall of Film Threat rated it 1.5/5 stars and wrote, "[T]his silly production stands as a dinky reminder of why martial arts film fell out of favor during the mid-1970s". J. Doyle Wallis of DVD Talk rated it 4/5 stars and called it "a complete guilty pleasure that leaves you feeling high off its empty b-movie fun". Mike Pinsky of DVD Verdict wrote that the film toys with and subverts many martial arts film cliches, which makes it surprising and entertaining.

== Soundtrack ==
Most of the music in the film is taken from Krautrock bands, and includes: "Super" (Opening theme) and "Super 16" (Master Fung's theme) from Neu!'s second studio album, Neu! 2; "Rubycon, Part One" (The One-Armed Boxer's theme) from Tangerine Dream's sixth studio album, Rubycon, and "Mitternacht" (Suspense theme), "Morgenspaziergang" (courtyard music) and "Kometenmelodie 2" (End credits) from Kraftwerk's fourth studio album, Autobahn.

The soundtrack has been referenced and sampled extensively, including the use of "Super 16" in Tarantino's Kill Bill.

== Legacy ==
Quentin Tarantino has cited the film as "one of my favorite movies of all time." The character Dhalsim from the Street Fighter video game series has been compared to the Indian assassin in the film. In The Boondocks episode "Stinkmeaner 3: The Hateocracy", the Hateocracy member Lord Rufus Crabmiser used a flying guillotine disguised as a lobster trap to attack the Freeman family and ultimately kill Bushido Brown.

=== Prequel ===
In 1977, a prequel titled Fatal Flying Guillotine was made by Hong Kong director Raymond Liu.
