= The Chinese Boxer =

1970 Hong Kong film by Jimmy Wang Yu

- Film poster

Chinese name
- Traditional Chinese: 龍虎鬥
- Simplified Chinese: 龙虎斗
Transcriptions
Standard Mandarin
- Hanyu Pinyin: Lóng Hǔ Dòu
Yue: Cantonese
- Jyutping: Lung^{4} Fu^{2} Dau^{3}
- Directed by: Jimmy Wang Yu
- Written by: Jimmy Wang Yu
- Produced by: Runme Shaw
- Starring: Jimmy Wang Yu; Lo Lieh; Wang Ping
- Cinematography: Hua Shan
- Edited by: Chiang Hsing-lung
- Music by: Wang Fu-ling; Eddie Wang Chi-ren
- Production company: Shaw Brothers Studio
- Distributed by: Shaw Brothers Studio
- Release date: 27 November 1970 (HK)
- Running time: 90 minutes
- Country: Hong Kong
- Language: Mandarin
- Box office: 2.076 M. HK$

The Chinese Boxer (Chinese: 龍虎鬥; lit. 'Dragon Tiger Fight', also known by its international title The Hammer of God) is a 1970 Hong Kong martial arts film produced and distributed by Shaw Brothers Studio, directed by and starring Jimmy Wang Yu, and featuring fight choreography by Tong Kai. The film co-stars Lo Lieh and Wang Ping.

It was a considerable financial success on release, and codified Wang Yu's superstar status. It is considered the first classic in the Kung Fu film genre, centering unarmed combat in a contemporary or semi-contemporary setting, without the fantasy or period elements prevalent in wuxia. It would prove influential to subsequent films like Fist of Fury.

== Plot ==
Lei Ming, a highly-skilled Chinese martial artist, takes revenge on a gang of Japanese karate thugs who decimated his martial arts school.

== Cast ==
- Jimmy Wang Yu as Lei Ming
- Lo Lieh as Kitashima
- Wang Ping as Li Shao-ling
- Chiu Hung as Diao Erh-yeh
- Cheng Lui as Chang Da-lung
- Fang Mien as Master Li Chun-hai
- Chan Sing as Ishihara
- Wang Chung as Tanaka
- Wong Kwong Yue as Sun Tung
- Wong Ching as Kume
- Li Tung as Lumura
- Yuen Wo-Ping as Hoi
- Erh Chun as Boss Lee

== Production ==
Ng See-yuen, still early in his career, was the film's assistant director and script supervisor.

== Sequel ==
The film was followed by a 1977 sequel, Return of the Chinese Boxer, also starring and directed by Jimmy Wang Yu.

== Home media ==
Celestial Pictures released the film on DVD. Paramount Pictures released the film on Blu-ray in Japan on 13 September 2013, and 88 Films in the UK.
