= Jimmy Wang Yu =

Taiwanese actor, director, producer, and screenwriter (1943–2022)

- 王羽
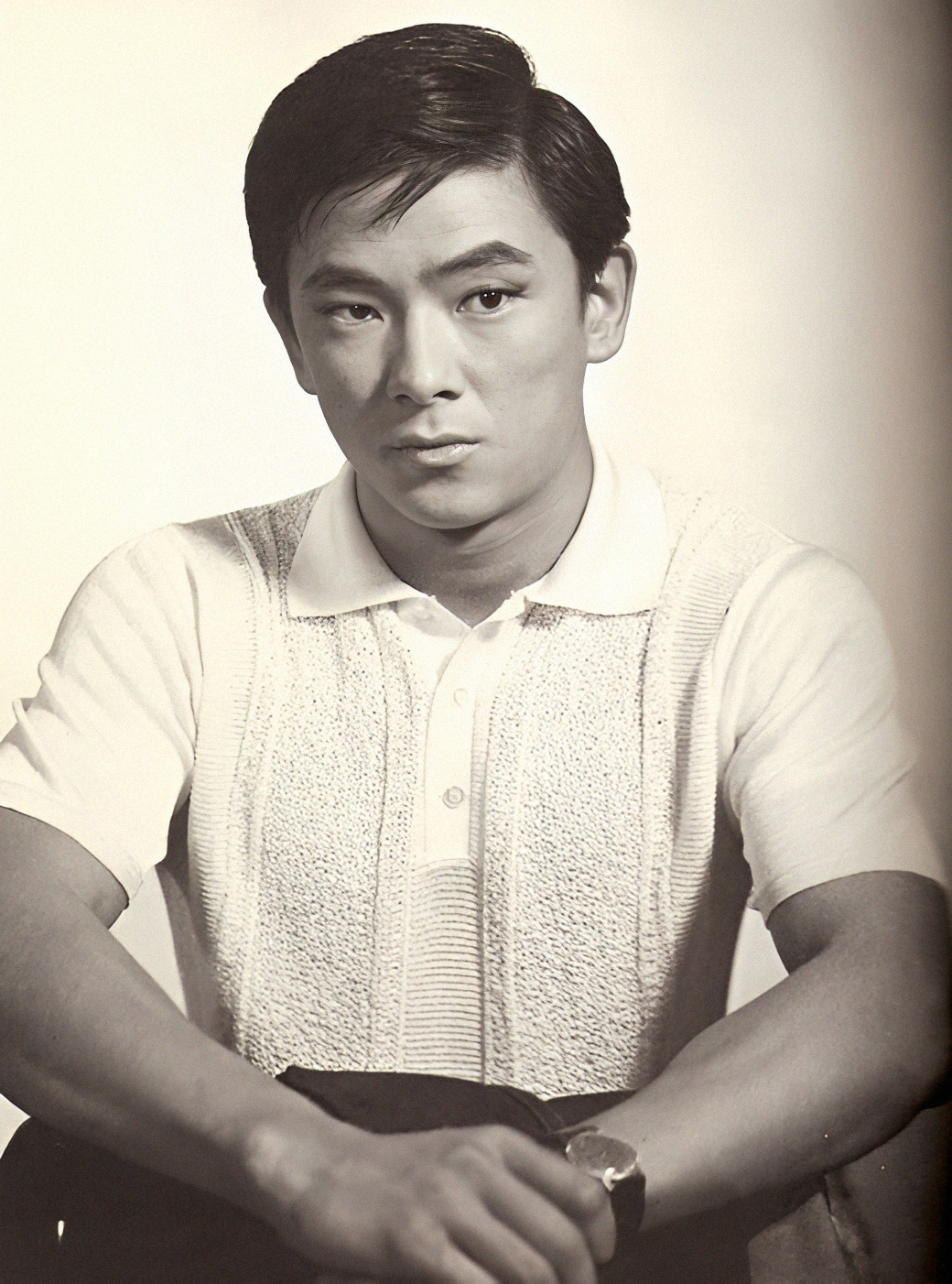
- Wang in 1960s
- Born: Wang Zhengquan; 28 March 1943; Shanghai, Republic of China
- Died: 5 April 2022 (aged 79); Cheng Hsin Hospital, Beitou District, Taipei, Taiwan
- Occupations: Actor; director; producer; screenwriter
- Years active: 1960–2013
- Spouses: Jeanette Lin Chui (m. 1969; div. 1975) Wang Kaizhen (m. 1978; div. 1997)
- Children: 3, including Linda Wong

Chinese name
- Chinese: 王羽
Transcriptions
Standard Mandarin
- Hanyu Pinyin: Wáng Yǔ
- Wade–Giles: Wáng Yǚ
- IPA: [wǎŋ ỳ]
Yue: Cantonese
- Yale Romanization: Wòhng Yyúh
- Jyutping: Wong4 Jyu5
- IPA: [wɔ̏ːŋ jy̬ː]
Southern Min
- Hokkien POJ: Ông-Ú

Wang Zhengquan
- Traditional Chinese: 王正權
- Simplified Chinese: 王正权
Transcriptions
Standard Mandarin
- Hanyu Pinyin: Wáng Zhèngquán
- Wade–Giles: Wáng Chèng-ch'ǘan
- Tongyong Pinyin: Wáng Jhèngcyuán
- Yale Romanization: Wáng Jèngchywán
Yue: Cantonese
- Yale Romanization: Wòhng Jeng Kyùhn
- Jyutping: Wong4 Zeng3 Kyun4
- IPA: [wɔ̏ːŋ tsɛ̄ːŋ kʰy̏ːn]
Southern Min
- Hokkien POJ: Ông Chèng-kôan

Jimmy Wang Yu (28 March 1943 – 5 April 2022) was a Hong Kong-Taiwanese martial artist, actor, film director, producer, and screenwriter. Initially a contract player for Shaw Brothers, he rose to fame for his starring role in The One-Armed Swordsman (1967) and its sequels, and was one of the first major stars of martial arts and wuxia cinema. At the height of his fame in the 1970s, he was the highest-paid martial arts actor in the world. According to The New York Times, Wang was "the biggest star of Asian martial arts cinema until the emergence of Bruce Lee."

Wang Yu was well known for his volatile personality and ties to organized crime off-screen. He was a suspected member of the Bamboo Union triad, and was charged in the 1981 murder of several Four Seas Gang members, though he was acquitted due to a lack of evidence.

== Early life ==
Born Wang Zheng Quan (王正權) in Shanghai in 1943, Wang and his family moved to Hong Kong when he was still a child. From a young age, he trained in karate, tai chi, Wudang quan and taijijian. For a time he served in the National Revolutionary Army, and was also a competitive swimmer and a car racing enthusiast.

== Film career ==
Wang joined Shaw Brothers Studio in 1963 as a stunt performer, and had his first acting role in the 1965 film Temple of the Red Lotus. In 1968, he acted with Cheng Pei-pei in the wuxia film Golden Swallow, directed by Chang Cheh. Following that, Wang starred in many other wuxia films, including One Armed Boxer (1971), Master of the Flying Guillotine (1976) and Return of the Chinese Boxer (1977).

If The One-Armed Swordsman was the movie that launched Wang's acting career, The Chinese Boxer was the film that sealed his fame in Hong Kong cinema. The latter has been credited as being the first Hong Kong martial arts film that kickstarted the unarmed combat genre, mainly kung fu. It also triggered a phenomenon that filled the ranks of many Chinese martial arts associations across Southeast Asia. Chinese youths, in their bid to emulate Wang, took to punching sandbags, and reading up on the history of Shaolin Kung Fu.

Controversy dogged Wang after the fame that exploded with The Chinese Boxer. He broke his contract with the Shaw Brothers Studio, and was promptly slapped with a lawsuit. The legal tussle that ended in the studio's favour led to Wang being banned from making films in Hong Kong. Wang then looked to Taiwan for better career prospects, linking up with Golden Harvest and other independent film outfits. His subsequent works were mostly filmed in Taiwan.

With the success of The Chinese Boxer, Wang stood unchallenged in Southeast Asia for a short time as the Chinese actor with the most formidable fists and legs. But beginning in the 1970s, Wang's star began to be eclipsed with the entry of new actors, many with superior martial arts training such as Ti Lung, David Chiang, and especially Bruce Lee, whose role in The Big Boss (1971) revolutionised the martial arts film genre.

In 1975, Wang starred in the Australian action film The Man from Hong Kong. In 1976, Wang appeared alongside Jackie Chan in Lo Wei's Killer Meteors. That same year, Wang wrote, directed, and starred in Master of the Flying Guillotine, produced by Wong Cheuk-hon, which became a cult classic and was later cited by Quentin Tarantino as one of his favorite films.. In the late 1970s, Wang helped Chan when then the latter sought his help in settling a dispute with Lo Wei that allegedly involved Triads. Chan eventually repaid the favor with his roles in Wang's films, Fantasy Mission Force (1982) and Island of Fire (1990).

In 1986, Sammo Hung cast Wang as Wong Kei-ying (the father of Chinese folk hero Wong Fei Hung) in Millionaire's Express. In the years that followed, Wang kept a low profile, making a rare public appearance in 2002 at the funeral of Chang Cheh.

Footage from Wang's 1976 film, Tiger & Crane Fists (also known as The Savage Killers), was used in the 2002 film Kung Pow! Enter the Fist, alongside new footage shot by Steve Oedekerk to create an original plot unrelated to the original film. In the film itself, Oedekerk, who wrote, produced, directed, and starred in the film, digitally inserted himself over Wang in many scenes where the Tiger & Crane Fists footage is used.

== Organized crime ==
Wang often associated with members of the Bamboo Union, a Taiwan-based triad, though his status as a made man was never confirmed.

In a 2007 interview with the Liberty Times, Wang claimed that Bai Wan-hsiung, the Kuomintang Director of Mainland Affairs, had asked him and another Bamboo Union member to assassinate Democratic Progressive Party chairman Hsu Hsin-liang in 1979. The Kuomintang long held ties to Bamboo Union. At the time, Hsu was living in exile the United States. In the same interview, Wang implicated the Kuomintang in the murder of Henry Liu.

=== Xinghua Pavilion incident ===
On April 23, 1976, Wang invited Hong Kong film mogul Charles Heung and several friends, including Bamboo Union members, to the Xinghua Pavilion restaurant in Taipei. Several members of the Four Seas, a rival triad, were also present. Wang allegedly instigated a fight between the two groups that ended in the deaths of Four Seas members Qiu Wenxiang and Gao Wenzhang.

The incident attracted much media attention, and Wang fled to Hong Kong to avoid arrest. He was eventually arrested and sentenced to five months in prison, which was reduced to a fine on appeal.

=== Tianchu Restaurant case and murder trial ===
On January 10, 1981, Wang and a group of friends were eating at the Tianchu Restaurant on Nanjing Road, when they were ambushed by members of the Four Seas triad in an apparent assassination attempt. Wang survived, but three of his friends were killed. Wang had previously had a falling out with the Four Seas after losing 1 million Yuan at a casino owned by Four Seas leader Liu Weimin, and his life had been repeatedly threatened. Wang reached out to Bamboo Union leader Chen Chi-li, requesting protection. Following a meeting between Bamboo Union leadership and Wang, the Union carried a string of retaliatory killings against the would be assassins. One of the targeted perpetrators, Liu Tieqiu, survived albeit with significant injuries.

The murders led to a crackdown on triads by Taiwanese authorities. Chen Yonghe, a Four Seas higher-up, asked Flying Eagle Gang member Liu Taisheng to act as an intermediary between the Four Seas and Wang, but Wang berated him and offered 400,000 Yuan for Liu's leg.

On May 8, Wang and Bamboo Union member Huang Shaocen were charged by the Taipei District Court for first-degree murder. The hearing was attended by members of Bamboo Union, Four Seas, and Flying Eagle. During a recess, Liu Taisheng attempted to negotiate with Wang. The conversation escalated into a fistfight, and Liu was stabbed by one of Wang's bodyguards. Wang and the other Bamboo Union members were subsequently taken into custody.

Wang was eventually acquitted due to a lack of evidence, though Huang Shaocen was sentenced to two years in prison for the attempted killing of Liu Tieqiu.

== Personal life ==
In 1969, Wang married actress Jeanette Lin Chui, who was nine years his senior. Before that, Wang had an affair with the wife of film director Chun Kim, who hanged himself before a divorce took place. Jeanette Lin, who had a high profile in Hong Kong cinema in the 1950s and 1960s, left the industry almost immediately after her marriage, which turned out to be tumultuous for both Wang and Lin. Amid allegations of domestic violence by Wang, the marriage crumbled in 1975. Wang and Lin had three daughters, and their eldest daughter Linda Wong became a popular Cantopop singer in the 1990s. Lin migrated to the United States in 1977 and died in 1995 from an asthma attack.

Wang later remarried in 1978 to air hostess Wang Kaizhen. This marriage was also tumultuous, with Wang Kaizhen ultimately filing for divorce and starting an affair with young businessman Zhang Zhao (張昭). After learning of it, Wang, accompanied by reporters and the police, surprised the couple at their lodging and publicly exposed his wife. After public humiliation was heaped on the couple, Wang divorced his second wife in 1997.

Wang's involvement in public brawls also made headlines from time to time.

== Health issues and death ==
In 2011, Wang suffered a stroke which caused him to lose much of his strength in the left side of his body. However, he worked vigorously in physical therapy, even exceeding the doctor's recommended pace. He would reportedly lift his arm 1000 times a day instead of 200 and walk three times the suggested distance. As a result of his efforts, he regained most of his ability to walk and talk, and he could lift his left arm, though he could no longer use its full strength.

Since his recovery, Wang tried to live as normal a life as possible and had even returned to film work. In an interview, he admitted to even driving to his physical therapy session with the use of only one arm but explained that his daughter put a stop to it when she found out, and that she had hired a driver for him.

Wang died on April 5, 2022, in Cheng Hsin Hospital, Beitou District, Taipei, at the age of 79.

== Filmography ==
=== Actor ===
- Temple of the Red Lotus (1965) - Kuei Wu
- The Twin Swords (1965) - Kuei Wu
- Tiger Boy (1966) - 'Tiger Boy' Lei Hu
- The Magnificent Trio (1966) - Fang Lu
- Kuai lo qing chun (1966)
- Asia-Pol (1966) - Yang Ming-Hsuan
- Auntie Lan (1967) - He You-Wen
- Trail of the Broken Blade (1967) - Li Yueh
- The Sword and the Lute (1967) - Kuei Wu
- The One-Armed Swordsman (1967) - Fang Kang / One-armed Swordsman
- The Assassin (1967) - Nieh Cheng
- Golden Swallow (1968) - Silver Roc Hsiao Peng
- The Sword of Swords (1968) - Ling Tseng-hsiao
- Qing guan (1968)
- Return of the One-Armed Swordsman (1969) - Fang Gang / One-armed Swordsman
- My Son (1970) - Yang Kuo-Liang
- The Chinese Boxer (1970) - Lei Ming
- Zatoichi and the One-Armed Swordsman (1971) - Wang Kong / One-armed Swordsman
- The Desperate Chase (1971)
- Xia yi shuang xiong (1971)
- The Magnificent Chivalry (1971)
- Jian (1971) - Hsia Ho Wei
- Zhui ming qiang (1971) - Lung Ti / The White Dragon
- The Invincible Sword (1971) - Ling Yu Fong
- Wei zhen si fang (1971) - Tiger Wong
- The Professional Killer (1971)
- Morale and Evil (1971) - Iron palm Bai Si-Feng
- Shogun Saints (1972)
- Furious Slaughter (1972) - Ma Yung Shen
- Kuang feng sha (1972) - Ti Si-Guan
- Ma Su Zhen bao xiong chou (1972)
- The Adventure (1972) - Guan Dong-Shan
- Chow Ken (1972) - Shi Ling Shu
- One-Armed Boxer (1972) - Yu Tien Lung
- Yi shen shi dan (1972) - The Gallant (parts 1, 2, 3)
- The Invincible (1972) - Li Mu-Bai
- The Last Duel (1971) - Yi Chun
- Ten Fingers of Steel (1972)
- Royal Fist (1972)
- Boxers of Loyalty and Righteousness (1972) - Li Yu / Yeh Tian-Hsin
- A Man Called Tiger (1973) - Chin Fu
- Knight Errant (1973) - Lin Hao-Shan
- Ai de tian di (1973) - Professor
- Seaman No. 7 (1973) - Wang Hai-Lung
- Black Friday (1973) - Chen Ah Kwang
- Beach of the War Gods (1973) - Hsia Feng
- The Two Cavaliers (1973)
- King of Boxers (1973) - Hong Ching Pau / Red Lantern
- Kung Fu Mama (1973) - Ma Yung-Chen
- The Tattooed Dragon (1973) - Tattooed Dragon
- Flying Fists of Death (1973)
- Si da tian wang (1974) - Hsiao Pao
- My Father, My Husband, My Son (1974)
- The Iron Man (1974) - Chin
- The Hero (1974) - Kang
- Four Real Friends (1974)
- Rage of the Masters (1975)
- The Man from Hong Kong (1975) - Inspector Fang Sing Leng
- A Cookbook of Birth Control (1975)
- The New Spartans (1975) - Material arts movie star Wang Fu
- Great Hunter (1975)
- Master of the Flying Guillotine (1976) - Liu Ti Lung, The One-Armed Boxer
- Tiger & Crane Fists (1976) - Ching Sing Chen
- The Killer Meteors (1976) - Mei Xing He
- A Queen's Ransom (1976) - Jimmy
- One-Armed Swordsman Against Nine Killers (1976) - Liu Ching Wu / Liu Yi Su / One Armed Swordsman
- One-Arm Chivalry Fights Against One-Arm Chivalry (1976) - Fong Ping / One-armed Swordsman
- Point of the Finger of Death (1977) - Ziqiang Ji (AKA Ziqiang Chi)
- Return of the Chinese Boxer (1977) - Sau Pai-lung
- The Criminal (1977)
- Brotherly Love (1977)
- Revenge of Kung Fu Mao (1977) - The Mayor
- Deadly Silver Spear (1977) - Lung Fei Yung / Silver Spear
- Blood of the Dragon (1978)
- Big Leap Forward (1978)
- Ma Su Chen (1979)
- Prisoners of Mao (1979)
- The Battle of Ku-ning-tou (1979)
- Fantasy Mission Force (1983) - Don Wen
- Shanghai (1984) - Black Hat
- Chuang jiang (1985)
- Millionaire's Express (1986) - Master Wong Kei Ying
- Thundering Ninja (1987) - David Wong
- Island of Fire (1990) - Kui / Lucas
- Once Upon a Time in China (1991)
- The Beheaded 1000 (1991) - Executioner Ren De Tie
- Shogun & Little Kitchen (1992) - Lam Chung Yuen
- Requital (1992) - Wai's hired assassin
- Kyokutô kuroshakai (1993) - Hong - Yan-Sheng
- Kung Pow! Enter the Fist (2002) - The Chosen One (archive footage; digitally replaced by Steve Oedekerk) (uncredited)
- Dragon (2011) - The Master (Jiaozhu)
- Let's Go! (2011)
- The Guillotines (2012) - Gong-E
- Soul (2013) - Wang (final film role)

=== Producer ===
- Boxers of Loyalty and Righteousness (1973)
- One-Armed Swordsman Against Nine Killers (1976)
- Return of the Chinese Boxer (1977)
- Island of Fire (1990)
- The Beheaded 1000 (1991)
- Stand Behind the Yellow Line (1997)
- Eighteen Springs (1997)

=== Director ===
- The Chinese Boxer (1970)
- The Brave and the Evil (1971)
- One-Armed Boxer (1971)
- Beach of the War Gods (1973)
- Four Real Friends (1974)
- The Man from Hong Kong (1975) (Australian Brian Trenchard-Smith was principal director with Wang Yu doing some 2nd unit work)
- Tiger & Crane Fists (1976)
- Master of the Flying Guillotine (1976)
- Return of the Chinese Boxer (1977)
- Kung Pow! Enter the Fist (2002) (archival footage) (uncredited)

=== Action director ===
- Boxers of Loyalty and Righteousness (1973)

=== Screenwriter ===
- The Chinese Boxer (1970)
- One-Armed Boxer (1971)
- Beach of the War Gods (1973)
- Master of the Flying Guillotine (1976)

== Awards and nominations ==
Year	Award	Category	Nominated work	Result
1977	15th Golden Horse Awards	Best Actor	Brotherly Love	Nominated
2011	48th Golden Horse Awards	Best Supporting Actor	Dragon	Nominated
2012	31st Hong Kong Film Awards	Best Supporting Actor	Dragon	Nominated
2013	15th Taipei Film festival	Best Actor	Soul	Won
2013	50th Golden Horse Film Awards	Best Leading Actor	Soul	Nominated
