= Kung Pow! Enter the Fist =

2002 film by Steve Oedekerk

- Theatrical release poster
- Directed by: Steve Oedekerk
- Written by: Steve Oedekerk
- Produced by: Steve Oedekerk; Tom Koranda; Paul Marshal
- Starring: Steve Oedekerk; Jennifer Tung; Leo Lee
- Cinematography: John J. Connor
- Edited by: Paul Marshal
- Music by: Robert Folk
- Production company: O Entertainment
- Distributed by: 20th Century Fox
- Release date: January 25, 2002
- Running time: 81 minutes
- Country: United States
- Language: English
- Budget: $10 million
- Box office: $17 million

Kung Pow! Enter the Fist is a 2002 American martial arts comedy film that parodies Hong Kong action cinema. Written by, directed by and starring Steve Oedekerk, it uses footage from the 1976 Hong Kong martial arts film Tiger & Crane Fists (also called The Savage Killers) starring and directed by Jimmy Wang Yu, along with new footage shot by Oedekerk, who is also digitally inserted over Wang in many scenes, to create an original, unrelated plot.

Despite a negative critical reception, the film was a moderate box office success, grossing $17 million worldwide against a $10 million budget. It has since been considered a cult classic for its off-the-wall humor and parodying of various dubbing tropes.

== Plot ==
A man, called The Chosen One by the narrator, wanders from town to town to search for the man who killed his family and tried to kill him when he was a baby. In one town, he meets Master Tang, a very ill and slightly deranged sifu, and asks Tang to help him improve his already impressive martial arts ability. Master Tang is skeptical at first, but after seeing The Chosen One's mark (his sentient tongue, which he names Tonguey), he allows him to train at his dojo. The Chosen One is introduced to two other students: Wimp Lo, a young man who was deliberately trained incorrectly as a joke, and Ling, a young woman who has romantic feelings for The Chosen One.

While training, The Chosen One shows cartoon-like feats of strength, and Wimp Lo deems him an enemy out of jealousy. Upon learning that Master Pain, the man who killed his parents, has just arrived in town, The Chosen One prepares to confront him. Master Pain draws a crowd and demonstrates his skills. He lets his henchmen hit him repeatedly with Bō staffs all over his body and groin, then subdues them all in one move. Impressed by Master Pain's skills, the town's mayor hires him, and Master Pain randomly changes his name to Betty. The Chosen One attempts to train himself by letting people hit him with bō staffs, but is knocked out after being hit. When he wakes up, a mysterious one-breasted woman named Whoa warns him not to rush to fight Betty. After flirtily fighting The Chosen One, Whoa flies off into the sky.

Ignoring Whoa's advice, The Chosen One sets off to find Betty. He comes across one of Betty's evil companions: Moo Nieu, a Holstein cow gifted in karate, with a large udder that can shoot milk as a weapon. The Chosen One eventually incapacitates Moo Nieu by milking her until her udder is empty. He sees Betty at a waterfall and confronts him. Master Doe, Ling's Father, shows up and tries to stop the unprepared Chosen One, and is wounded by Betty. The Chosen One takes Master Doe to Master Tang; it turns out they are old friends. However, as Tang massages Doe's wound, it does not close and Doe dies that night. Out of depression, Ling confesses her feelings for The Chosen One.

Confused, The Chosen One journeys out to a field and consults the heavens for confidence. Suddenly Mu-Shu Fasa, a lion, appears in the sky and dispenses advice in a scene parodying a portion of The Lion King. He returns to town and finds that Betty's hostility has expanded to the entire town, and they are killing anyone who may be his allies. He finds Wimp Lo, Ling, Master Tang and even his dog heavily maimed. However, except for Lo, they all survive. After taking Ling and his dog to safety, The Chosen One begins training himself. Discovering Betty's weak points are the pyramid spikes embedded in his chest, The Chosen One makes wooden dummies, embeds similar spikes onto their chests and attempts to pluck them out with his bare hands. His hands are battered and he is exhausted, but after Ling treats his wounds and gives an inspiring speech, he finds himself rejuvenated and successfully pulls off the attack.

Meanwhile, Betty is called by the mysterious Evil Council and learns that The Chosen One is alive. The Chosen One confronts Betty at the temple. They fight evenly, until the Evil Council shows up revealing themselves to be French aliens, and gives Betty supernatural powers. Betty viciously beats up The Chosen One, who, in a semi-unconscious state, sees visions of Whoa and Mu-Shu Fasa giving him advice. Mu-Shu instructs him to open his mouth. As soon as he does, Tonguey flies out and attacks and destroys the mother ship, causing the entire Evil Council armada to panic and retreat, leaving Betty vulnerable. The Chosen One eventually rips the pyramid spikes out of Betty's chest, killing him. As The Chosen One returns home with Ling, his tribulations are far from over, as presented in a trailer for a sequel, Kung Pow 2: Tongue of Fury, that immediately follows the final scene.

In a post-credits scene, Master Tang, who has been left behind, asks someone to help him from a hungry golden eagle eating his leg.

== Cast ==
- Steve Oedekerk – The Chosen One
- Jimmy Wang Yu (archival footage)
- Alejandro Olazabal – The Chosen One as a baby
- Hui Lou Chen – Master Tang (archival footage)
- Fei Lung – Master Pain a.k.a. "Betty" (archival footage)
- Leo Lee – Young Master Pain/Fei Lung body double for new footage
- Ling Ling Tse – Ling (archival footage)
- Lin Yan – Dying Ling/Ling Ling Tse body double for new footage
- Lau Kar-wing – Wimp Lo (archival footage)
- Banjo – Dog
- Jennifer Tung – Whoa
- Chi Ma – Master Doe (archival footage)
- Tad Horino – Chew Fat Lip
- Nasty Nes – Boombox Henchman
- Ming Lo – Father
- Peggy Lu – Mother
- Tori Tran – Peasant Woman
- Simon Rhee – Young Master Pain's Henchman

=== Voiced-over characters ===
In many scenes, original actors were replaced by Oedekerk via post-production chroma key and digital compositing techniques such as head replacement, primarily Jimmy Wang Yu, the lead actor in Tiger & Crane Fists, although Oedekerk replaced other characters as well. Oedekerk also re-dubbed all of the original cast's voices himself, inventing a different voice for every character. The only exception is the character of "Whoa", who was voiced by her actress, Jennifer Tung. In all new scenes, Oedekerk, Tung and the other actors spoke nonsensical lines, which were later re-dubbed with the correct lines from the script, in order to maintain the appearance of a poorly-dubbed foreign language consistent with the rest of the film.

== Reception ==
Review aggregator website Rotten Tomatoes reports an approval rating of 13% based on 55 reviews, with an average rating of 3.5/10. The site's critics' consensus reads: "A short sketch's worth of jokes stretched into a full-length feature." Metacritic reports an average score of 14 out of 100 based on 14 critics, indicating "overwhelming dislike". At the 2002 Stinkers Bad Movie Awards, the film was nominated for Worst Picture and tied with The Master of Disguise for a win for Most Painfully Unfunny Comedy.

Kung Pow! Enter the Fist grossed a total of $17 million worldwide on a budget of $10 million.

== Future ==
In a livestream on March 27, 2022, Oedekerk has stated that, while his original plan was for there to be a Kung Pow trilogy, discussions to make a sequel with 20th Century Studios have not worked out, as no interest was ever shown. He also stated that he has thought of making a spiritual successor to the film using Spaghetti Westerns and/or sword-and-sandal films. No further updates have been given since.
