= List of Shaw Brothers films =

This is a list of films produced by Shaw Brothers Studios. Films that were distributed but not produced by the studio are not included in this list.

1951 - 1952 - 1953 - 1954 - 1955 - 1956 - 1957 - 1958 - 1959

1960 - 1961 - 1962 - 1963 - 1964 - 1965 - 1966 - 1967 - 1968 - 1969

1970 - 1971 - 1972 - 1973 - 1974 - 1975 - 1976 - 1977 - 1978 - 1979

1980 - 1981 - 1982 - 1983 - 1984 - 1985 - 1988 - 1989

1990 - 1992 - 1993 - 1994 - 1995 - 1996 - 1997

2003 - 2009

2010 - 2011 - 2015 - 2016 - 2019

== 1951 ==
- 13 Grand Tutors

== 1952 ==
- Sweet Memories
- Good Faith
- Back Home Again
- Sweet Song for You
- Destroy
- A Double-Faced Man
- Tomorrow
- Anything Can Happen

== 1953 ==
- Heaven of Love
- A Midsummer Night's Love
- Meal Time
- Green Heaven
- A Song to Remember
- Little Couple
- The 3rd Life
- Black Gloves

== 1954 ==
- Wind Withers
- Girl On The Loose
- Beyond the Grave
- Girls in Transformation
- Temptation

== 1955 ==
- Chin Ping Mei
- Forever Goodbye
- Love & Obligation
- Che Sin Ching
- The Feud

== 1956 ==
- Our Lovely Baby
- The Error
- A Lonely Heart
- Meet Me After Spring
- The Orphan Girl
- The Secret of a Married Woman
- Our Good Daughter
- Beyond The Blue Horizon
- Siren, Part 1
- Siren, Part 2
- Autumn Affair
- The Chase

== 1957 ==
- A Mating Story
- The Greatest Circus on Earth
- Lady in Distress
- The Dances of Charm
- Springtime in Paradise
- Miss Evening Sweet
- Frosty Night
- A Mellow Spring
- He Has Taken Him for Another
- A Marriage for Love
- The Lady of Mystery
- You Are My Soul

== 1958 ==
- The Circus
- Love with an Alien
- A Kiss for Me
- Diau Charn
- An Appointment After Dark
- The Angel
- The Unforgettable Night
- Red Lantern
- Dan Fung Street
- The Blessed Family
- The Magic Touch
- Where Is My Bride

== 1959 ==
- Full of Joy
- Love Letter Murder
- Stolen Love
- Black Gold
- Love & War
- Day-Time Husband
- Enchanted Melody
- The Vengeance of the Vampire
- Darling Daughter
- The Kingdom & The Beauty
- The Other Woman
- Spring Frolic
- The Pink Murder
- Appointment With Death
- Desire
- The Adventure of the 13th Sister

== 1960 ==
- Eve of the Wedding
- Flames of Passion
- The Deformed
- Rendezvous In The South Sea
- Twilight hours
- Malayan Affair
- A Shot In The Dark
- Rear Entrance
- My Daughter, My Daughter
- East Flows The River
- Street Boys
- Love Thy Neighbor
- How To Marry A Millionaire
- The Secret of Miss Pai
- When The Peach Blossoms Bloom
- Kiss Me Again
- The Enchanting Shadow

== 1961 ==
- All The Best
- Les Belles
- I, Murder
- The Swallow
- Oh Boys! Oh Girls!
- Kiss for Sale
- The 3 Ladies of Hong Kong
- The Lost Love
- The Girl Next Door
- The Fair Sex
- The Golden Trumpet
- The Husband's Secret
- The Rose of Summer
- Till the Clouds Roll By
- Love Without End
- The Pistol
- When The Poles Meet

== 1962 ==
- The Mix-Up
- Yang Kwei Fei
- Dream of the Red Chamber
- Madam White Snake
- The Tryst
- When Fortune Smiles
- The Black Fox
- Mid-Nightmare

== 1963 ==
- Mid-Nightmare-2
- To Catch A Murderer
- Love Parade
- 3 Dolls of Hong Kong
- The Second Spring
- Revenge of a Swordswoman
- The Love Eterne
- Her Sister's Keeper
- My Lucky Star
- Empress Wu Tse-Tien
- Bitter Sweet
- Return of the Phoenix
- The Adultress
- Stepmother
- The Lady & The Thief
- 3 Sinners
- A Maid from Heaven

== 1964 ==
- Between Tears and Smiles
- Dancing Millionairess
- The Coin (1964 film)
- Amorous Lotus Pan
- Comedy of Mismatches
- Lady General Hua Mu-lan
- The Shepherd Girl《山歌戀》(Shan Ge Lian)
- Last Woman of Shang
- Black Forest
- Story of Sue San
- Lover's Rock
- The Crimson Palm
- Beyond The Great Wall
- Female Prince
- The Warlord & The Actress

== 1965 ==
- The Mermaid
- Song Fest
- Butterfly Chalice
- Sons of Good Earth
- The Grand Substitution
- Song of Orchid Island
- Pink Tears
- Crocodile River
- Lotus Lamp
- The Lark
- Vermillion Door
- Hong Kong, Manilia, Singapore
- Temple of the Red Lotus
- Inside the Forbidden City
- Call of the Sea
- The West Chamber
- Squadron '77
- Move Over Darling
- Twin Swords

== 1966 ==
- The Monkey
- Tiger Boy
- The Dawn Will Come
- Till the End of Time
- Come Drink with Me
- The Golden Buddha
- Knight of Knights
- The Blue & The Black
- The Blue & The Black 2
- Princess Iron Fan
- Sweet and Wild
- The Mating Season
- Rose, Be My Love
- Poisonous Rose
- Magnificent Trio
- The Perfumed Arrow
- The Joy of Spring

== 1967 ==
- Angel With the Iron Fists
- Pearl Phoenix
- Hong Kong Nocturne
- That Man In Chang-An
- Madame Slender Plum
- Auntie Lan
- Trail of the Broken Blade
- The Goddess Of Mercy
- Too Late for Love
- The Black Falcon (1967 film)
- Moonlight Serenade
- The Sword & The Lute
- Operation Lipstick
- 4 Sisters
- The Thundering Sword
- Sweet Is Revenge
- Asia-Pol
- Sing High, Sing Low
- King With My Face
- Interpol
- Dragon Creek
- That Tender Age
- The One-Armed Swordsman (獨臂刀)
- Purple Shell
- The Mirror
- Kiss & Kill
- Cave of the Silken Web (盤絲洞)
- Midnight Murder
- Blue Skies (1967 film)
- Silent Swordsman
- Swan Song
- My Dream Boat
- Song of Tomorrow
- Susanna
- Trapeze Girl
- Rape of the Sword
- The Mirror & The Lychee
- King Drummer
- Summons To Death
- King Cat
- Lady Jade Lockett
- The Assassin
- The Bandits

== 1968 ==
- Mist Over Dream Lake
- Forever & Ever
- Land of Many Perfumes
- Hong Kong Rhapsody
- Gun Brother
- Black Butterfly
- The Silver Fox
- Golden Swallow
  - a.k.a. U.K. title: The Girl With The Thunderbolt Kick
- Flower Blossoms
- Magnificent Swordsman
- Killer Darts
- Fallen Petals
- Angel Strikes Again
- Bells of Death
- Forever Diamonds
- The Rainbow
- That Fiery Girl
- Sword of Swords
- 3 Swinging Girls
- Double Trouble
- Death Valley
- When the Clouds Roll By
- Summer Heat
- Jade Raksha
- Enchanted Chamber
- The Fastest Sword
- The Brain-Stealers
- Divorce, Hong Kong Style

== 1969 ==
- Twin Blades of Doom
- Tomorrow Is Another Day
- Killers 5
- The Singing Thief
- Return of the One-Armed Swordsman
- Unfinished Melody
- 12 Deadly Coins
- Dragon Swamp
- Temptress of a Thousand Faces
- Dear Murderer
- Dark Semester
- Diary of a Lady Killer
- Millionaire Chase
- Flying Daggers
- Partisan Lovers
- The Invincible Fist
- Dead End
- Vengeance Is A Golden Blade
- Raw Courage
- Singing Escort
- Raw Passions
- The Three Smiles
- The Swordmates
- Golden Sword
- Torrent of Desire'
- Farewell, My Love
- River of Tears
- Dark Rendezvous
- Have Sword, Will Travel
- Tropicana Interlude

== 1970 ==
- Ripples
- A Cause To Kill
- Naked Love
- The Wandering Swordsman
- Double Bliss
- Who's Baby's In The Classroom
- The Winged Tiger
- Lady of Steel
- Younger Generation
- The 5 Billion Dollar Legacy
- Brothers Five
- A Place To Call Home
- Golden Knight
- Heads for Sale
- Vengeance
  - a.k.a. U.S. title: Kung Fu Vengeance
- Young Lovers
- Hellgate
- My Son
- The Twelve Gold Medallions
- Love Without End
- Swordswomen 3
- The Heroic Ones
  - a.k.a. U.S. title: The Shaolin Masters
- Love Song Over The Sea
- Guess Who Killed My 12 Lovers
- A Taste of Cold Steel
- The Orchid
- Valley of the Fangs
- A Time for Love
- Secret of the Dirk
- Price of Love
- The Iron Buddha
- Apartment for Ladies
- The Chinese Boxer
  - a.k.a. U.S. title: The Hammer of God
- The Singing Killer
- Drinking Knight
- Common Families
- Love for Sale

== 1971 ==
- King Eagle
- The Lady Hermit
- New One-Armed Swordsman
  - a.k.a. U.S. title: Triple Irons
- The Venus Tear Diamond
- Mission Impossible, originally Jian nu you hun
- It Takes A Man To Be Henpecked
- 6 Assassins
- Silent Love
- The Jade Faced Assassin
- Long Road To Freedom
- The Duel
  - a.k.a. U.S. title: Duel of the Iron Fist
- The Eunuch
- Thousand Years Fox
- The Long Years (film)
- Merciful Sword
- Man With 2 Wives
- Golden Seal
- The Lady Professional
- Redbeard
- The Crimson Charm
- Anonymous Heroes
- The Shadow Whip
- We Love Millionaires
- Swift Knight
- Night Is Young (1971 film)
- Shadow Girl
- The Rescue
- Duel of Fists
- Lady with a Sword
- Swordsman At Large
- Vengeance of a Snow Girl
- Duel for Gold
- Sunset
- Come Haunt With Me
- Oath of Death
- The Deadly Duo
- Long Chase
- Dragon Tiger Meet
- Mighty One
- Sword Hand
- Flying Flag
- Nocturnal Killer
- Girl of Ghost Valley

== 1972 ==
- The Killer
  - a.k.a. U.S. title: The Sacred Knives of Vengeance
- Yellow Muffler
- The Champion of Champions
- The Black Enforcer
- Boxer from Shantung
  - a.k.a. U.S. title: The Killer from Shantung
- Angry Guest
  - a.k.a. U.S. title: The Kung Fu Killers
- Human Goddess
- The Water Margin, originally Shui hu zhuan
  - a.k.a. U.S. title: Seven Blows of the Dragon
- The Bride from Hell
- The Casino
- Finger of Doom, originally Tai yin zhi
- The Young Avenger
- 5 Fingers of Death, originally Tian xia di yi quan
  - a.k.a. U.K. title: King Boxer
  - a.k.a. international title: Invincible Boxer
- Trilogy of Swordsmanship
- Of Wives & Mistresses
- Pursuit
- Merry Wife
- The Devil's Mirror
- Let's Go to Bed
- The Deadly Knives
  - a.k.a. U.S. title: The Fists of Vengeance
- Young People
- The Gourd Fairy
- 14 Amazons
- The Warlord
- Intimate Confessions of a Chinese Courtesan (愛奴)
- Delightful Forest
- Flower in the Rain
- Imperial Swordsman
- Man of Iron
  - a.k.a. U.S. title: Warrior of Steel
- Stranger In Hong Kong
- The Lizard
- Intrigue In Nylons
- Legends of Lust (風月奇譚)
- The Fugitive
- Black Tavern
- 4 Riders
  - a.k.a. U.S. title: Strike 4 Revenge
  - a.k.a. U.K. title: Hellfighters of the East
- Thunderbolt Fist

== 1973 ==
- Ambush
- The Champion
  - a.k.a. U.S. title: Shanghai Lil And The Sun Luck Kid
- Call to Arms, originally Dao bing fu
- Love Across the Seas
- Tales of Larcency, originally Niu gui she shen
- The Delinquent
  - a.k.a. U.S. title: Street Gangs of Hong Kong
- Blood Brothers
  - a.k.a. U.S. title: Dynasty of Blood
  - a.k.a. U.K. title: Chinese Vengeance
- The Villains
- Sexy Girls of Denmark, originally Dan Ma jiao wa
  - a.k.a. The Dollies of Denmark
- Imperial Tombs Raiders
- Facets of Love
- Generation Gap
- River of Fury
- Kiss of Death, originally Du nu
- The Bastard
- The Escaper
- The Boxers
- Police Force
- The Virgins
- The Big Fellow (1973 film)
- Payment in Blood
- The Pirate
- Illicit Desire
- Sexy Playgirls
- Na Cha and the 7 Devils
- Master of Kung Fu
- The House of 72 Tenants
- The Happiest Moment
- Sugar Daddies
- Iron Bodyguard
- The Bamboo House of Dolls
- This Time I'll Make You Rich
- Hill Fortress

== 1974 ==
- Crazy Nuts of Kung Fu
- Village of Tigers
- The Golden Lotus
- Heroes Two, originally Hung Hsi-Kuan And Fang Shi-Yu
  - a.k.a. U.S. title: Kung Fu Invaders
- Killer Snakes
- The Savage Five
- Sinful Adultress
- Shadow Boxer
- Ghost Lovers
- Thirteen
- Sex, Love, & Hate
- Men from the Monastery, originally Shao Lin zi di
  - a.k.a. U.S. title: Disciples of Death
  - a.k.a. U.K. title: Dragon's Teeth
- Scandal, originally Chou wen
- Hong Kong '73
- The Drug Addict, originally Xi du zhe
- Gossip Street
- Rivals of Kung Fu
- The Crazy Bumpkins
- Sex For Sale
- Virgins of the Seven Seas
  - a.k.a. U.S. title: The Bod Squad
  - a.k.a. German title: Karate, Küsse, Blonde Katzen
- Friends, originally Peng you
- Cheeky Little Angels
- The Legend of the 7 Golden Vampires
  - a.k.a. Dracula and the 7 Golden Vampires
  - a.k.a. U.S. title: The 7 Brothers Meet Dracula
- Shatter
  - a.k.a. U.S. title: Call Him Mr. Shatter
- Sorrow of the Gentry
- Shaolin Martial Arts
- Sinful Confessions
- Mini-Skirt Gang
  - a.k.a. Danish title: Bikini Banden
- Supermen Against the Orient
  - a.k.a. original Italian title: Crash! Che Botte! Strippo, Strappo, Stroppio
- Young Lovers On Flying Wheels
- Na Cha the Great
- Young Passion
- The Tea House
- Women of Desire
- Ghost Eyes
- 5 Tough Guys
  - a.k.a. U.S. title: Kung Fu Hellcats
- Kidnap, originally Tian wang
- Rat Catcher
- 2 Faces of Love
- Five Shaolin Masters
  - a.k.a. U.S. title: The 5 Masters of Death
- Blood Money
  - a.k.a. U.S. title: The Stranger and the Gunfighter
  - a.k.a. El Karate, El Colt y El Impostor

== 1975 ==
- Forbidden Tales of Two Cities
- Quenn Hustler
- Happy Trio
- The Young Rebel
  - a.k.a. The Rebel Youth
- Flying Guillotine
- Temperament of Life
- The Hooker and the Hustler
- Night of the Devil's Bride
- The Empress Dowager
- Love's Destiny
- Gambling Syndicate
- 2 Con Men
- Salina
- All Men Are Brothers
  - a.k.a. U.S. title: The Seven Soldiers of Kung Fu
- Cohabitation
- Return of the Crazy Bumpkins
- Lady of the Law
- Evil Seducers
- Well of Doom
- Disciples of Shaolin
  - a.k.a. U.S. title: The Invincible One
- My Bewitched Wife
- Big Brother Cheng
- The Super Inframan
  - a.k.a. The Chinese Superman
  - a.k.a. U.S. title: Infra-Man
- Super Stooges vs. the Wonder Women
- The Imposter
- The Fantastic Magic Baby
  - a.k.a. Red Boy
- Taxi Driver
- Girl's Diary
- Fearful Interlude
- The Big Holdup
- All Mixed Up
- Black Magic
- Thief of Thieves
- Carry On Con Men
- Bloody Escape
- Romance In Paris
- Cleopatra Jones and the Casino of Gold
  - a.k.a. The Dragon Lady
- That's Adultery
- The Spiritual Boxer
  - a.k.a. U.S. title: The Naked Fists of Terror
- Girl With the Long Hair
- The Golden Lion
- Cuties Parade
- Marco Polo, originally Ma Ko Po Lo
  - a.k.a. U.S. title: The 4 Assassins

== 1976 ==
- Springtime in Pattaya
- I Love You, Bruce Lee
  - a.k.a. Bruce Lee And I
  - a.k.a. U.S. title: Bruce Lee - His Last Days, His Last Nights
- The Criminals
- Heroes of the Underground
- Boxer Rebellion
  - a.k.a. international title: The Spiritual Fists
  - a.k.a. U.S. title: The Bloody Avengers
- Big Time For the Crazy Bumpkins
- Drug Connection
  - a.k.a. DVD title: The Sexy Killer
- The Last Tempest
- Oriental Playgirls, originally Ming nu ren ji yi lu
- Spirit of the Raped
- Killer Clans
- Wedding Nights
- 7-Man Army, originally Ba dao lou zi
  - a.k.a. Fortress At The 8 Path Crossroads
  - a.k.a. The 7-Man Army
- Dragon Missile
- Erotic Nights
- Challenge of the Masters
- Beautiful Vixen
- The Condemned
- Emperor Chien Lung
- Shaolin Avengers
  - a.k.a. U.S. title: The Invincible Kung Fu Brothers
- Crazy Sex, originally Nian hua re cao
- The Magic Blade
- Brotherhood
- Snake Prince
- Hustler from Canton
- Homicides: The Criminals, Part II, originally Xiong sha
- Killers on Wheels
- New Shaolin Boxers
  - a.k.a. U.S. title: Demon Fists of Kung Fu
  - a.k.a. VHS title: Grandmaster of Death
- The Mad Boy
- Love Swindlers
- Oily Maniac
- Girls For Sale
- Mr. Funny Bone
  - a.k.a. Old Master Q
- Big Bad Sis
- Escort Girl
- Web of Death
  - a.k.a. Five Poisons
- Girlie Bar
- King Gambler
- Farewell to a Warrior
- Black Magic 2
  - a.k.a. U.S. title: Revenge of the Zombies
- Crazy Bumpkins in Singapore
- Shaolin Temple
  - a.k.a. U.S. title: Death Chamber

== 1977 ==
- Moods of Love
- The Crooks
- Lady Exterminator
- Return of the Con Man
- Arson: The Criminals 3
- Executioners from Shaolin
  - a.k.a. U.S. title: The Executioners of Death
- Clans of Intrigue
- Mysterious Lady Killer
- Deadly Angels
- The Naval Commandos
- Romantic Scholar
- Murder On the Wedding Night
- Jade Tiger
- Confessions of a Private Secretary
- Magnificent Wanderers
  - a.k.a. U.S. title: The Magnificent Kung Fu Warriors
- Adventures of Emperor Chien Lung
- Assault: The Criminals 4
- Cobra Girl
  - a.k.a. Fangs of the Cobra
- Death Duel
- To Kill A Jaguar
- The Brave Archer
  - a.k.a. U.S. title: Kung Fu Warlords
- The Mighty Peking Man
  - a.k.a. U.S. title: Goliathon
- Judgement of an Assassin
- The Battle Wizard
- Starlets For Sale
- The Call Girls
- Sentimental Swordsman
- The Dream of the Red Chamber
- Teenager's Nightmare
- Dreams of Eroticism
- Chinatown Kid
- Innocent Lust
- Pursuit of Vengeance
- The Mad Monk

== 1978 ==
- Gang of Four
- The Flying Guillotine 2
- The 36th Chamber of Shaolin, originally Shao Lin san shi liu fang
  - a.k.a. U.S. title: The Master Killer
- Clans of Amazons
- Vengeful Beauty
- Mad Monk Strikes Again
- Proud Youth
- The Psychopath
- Soul of the Sword
- Delinquent Teenagers
- The Brave Archer 2
  - a.k.a. U.S. title: Kung Fu Warlords Part II
- Shaolin Handlock
- The Deadly Mantis
  - a.k.a. Shaolin Mantis
- Legends of the Bat
  - a.k.a. U.S. title: Bat Island Adventure
- Cunning Hustler
- Five Deadly Venoms
  - a.k.a. Five Venoms
  - a.k.a. Shaolin Deadly Poisons
- Sensual Pleasure
- Notorious Frame-Up
- Hello Sexy Late Homecomers
- Avenging Eagle
- Crazy Imposters
- The Voyage of Emperor Chien Lung
- Heaven Sword and Dragon Sabre
- Heaven Sword & Dragon Sabre 2
- Double Cross
- Swordsman and the Enchantress
- Mr. Funnybone Strikes Again
- Invincible Shaolin
  - a.k.a. U.S. title: Unbeatable Dragon
- The Big Robberies
  - a.k.a. Bank-Buster
- Crippled Avengers
  - a.k.a. U.S. title: Mortal Combat
  - a.k.a. DVD title: The Return of the 5 Deadly Venoms
- Heroes of the East
  - a.k.a. U.S. title: Challenge of the Ninja
  - a.k.a. U.K. title: Shaolin Challenges Ninja
- The Extra Hand
- Ku Ling Ching Kuai Hsiao Kuei Tou
- San Shan Wu Yu Jen Ma

== 1979 ==
- Foxy Ladies
- Best Hustler Wins
- Full Moon Scimitar
- Scandalous Warlord
- Spiritual Boxer 2
- Life Gamble
- Ghost Story
- Young Lovers
- Reckless Cricket
- Shaolin Rescuers
- Last Judgement
- The Deadly Breaking Sword
- The Brothers
- Monkey Kung Fu
  - a.k.a. U.S. title: The Stroke of Death
- He Who Never Dies
- Legend of Feng Hsiu
- Murder Plot
- The Kung Fu Instructor
- Shaolin Daredevils
- Abbot of Shaolin
- The Proud Twins
- Dirty Ho
- What Price Honesty
- Naughty Scandals
- The Ghost and I
- 5 Superfighters
- Tigress of Shaolin
- Magnificent Ruffians
- Mad Monkey Kung Fu
- Kid with the Golden Arm
- Invincible Enforcer
- To Kill a Mastermind
- Forbidden Pest
- Return of the Dead
- Fighting Fool
- Boxer from the Temple
  - a.k.a. U.S. title: The Boxer from Shaolin

== 1980 ==
- Clan of the White Lotus, originally Hung wen tin san po pai lien chiao
  - a.k.a. U.S. title: Fists of the White Lotus
- Heaven and Hell
  - a.k.a. U.S. title: Shaolin Hellgate
- Disco Bumpkins
- Emperor Chien Lung and the Beauty
- Convict Killer
  - a.k.a. U.S. title: The Iron Chain Assassin
- Killer Constable
  - a.k.a. U.S. title: Karate Exterminator
- Ten Tigers of Kwangtung
- The Tiger and the Widow
- 2 Champions of Shaolin, originally Shaolín yu wu dang
  - a.k.a. U.S. title: 2 Champions of Death
- The Informer
- The Master
  - a.k.a. U.S. title: The 3 Evil Masters
- Coward Bastard
- Kid With A Tattoo
  - a.k.a. U.S. title: Claw of the Eagle
- Hex
- Heroes Shed No Tears
- Swift Sword
- Flag of Iron
  - a.k.a. U.S. title: The Spearman of Death
- A Deadly Secret
- Pei Chen Hsiao-Tzu
- The Sword of Vengeance
- The Rebel Intruders
  - a.k.a. U.S. title: Killer Army
- Rendezvous With Death
- Lost Souls
- Legend of the Fox
- Hex Versus Witchcraft
- Bat Without Wings
- Return to the 36th Chamber
  - a.k.a. U.S. title: Return of the Master Killer
- Young Outcasts

== 1981 ==
- Return of the Sentimental Swordsman
- My Young Auntie
  - a.k.a. U.S. title: Kung Fu Concubine
- Sexy Career Girls
- Lion Vs. Lion
  - a.k.a. U.S. title: Roar of the Lion
- Sword Stained with Royal Blood
- Challenge of the Gamesters
- Avengers from Hell
- Revenge of the Corpse
- Masked Avengers
- Murderer Pursues
- Corspe Mania
- Treasure Hunters
  - a.k.a. U.S. title: Master of Disaster
- The Emperor and His Brother
- One Heart, One Spirit
- Martial Club
  - a.k.a. U.S. title: The Instructors of Death
- One Way Only
- Bewitched
- Notorious 8
- Family of Lust
- Mobfix Patrol
- Battle for the Republic of China
- Bloody Parrot
- The Duel of the Century
- The Brave Archer 3
  - a.k.a. U.S. title: Blast of the Iron Palm
- Black Lizard
- Mahjong Heroes
- Godfather from Canton
- Ambitious Kung Fu Girl
- Gang Master
- Ying Lu Tuo Yang Ping

== 1982 ==
- Legendary Weapons of China
  - a.k.a. U.S. title: Legendary Weapons of Kung Fu
- House of Traps
  - a.k.a. U.S. title: Deadly Shaolin Traps
- Winner Takes All
- The Brave Archer and His Mate
  - a.k.a. Mysterious Island
- Clan Feuds
- Rolls, Rolls, I Love You
- Five Element Ninjas
  - a.k.a. U.S. title: Super Ninjas
- Passing Flickers
- Perils of the Sentimental Swordsman
- Lover's Blades
- Hell Has No Boundary
- Hex After Hex
- Spirit of the Sword
- Fake Ghost Catchers
  - a.k.a. Kung Fu Ghostbusters
- Kid from Kwang Tung
- Human Lanterns
- Buddha's Palm
- Cat vs. Rat
- Brothers from the Walled City
- Curse of Evil
- 2.5 CM Young Heroes of the Street
- Tiger Killer
- The Pure and the Evil
- My Rebellious Son
  - a.k.a. Raging Tiger
- Emperor and the Minister
- Descendant of the Sun
- Mercenaries from Hong Kong
- The Boxer's Omen (a.k.a. Mo)
- Hong Kong Playboys
- Little Dragon Maiden
- Ode to Gallantry
- Lo Yu Tan Chi

== 1983 ==
- Ghosts Galore
- Lady Assassin
- Roving Swordsman
- Twinkle Twinkle Little Star
- Shaolin Prince
  - a.k.a. U.S. title: Iron Fingers of Death
- Lady Is the Boss
- Tales of a Eunuch
- Portrait in Crystal
- Usurphers of the Emperor's Power
- Long Road to Gallantry
- The Weird Man
- Holy Flame of the Martial World
- Hong Kong, Hong Kong
- Mad Man '83
- Demon of the Lute
- Let's Make Laugh
- Bastard Swordsman
- Supreme Swordsman
- Shaolin Intruders
  - a.k.a. U.S. title: Battle for Shaolin
- Men from the Gutter
- Fast Fingers
- Seeding of a Ghost
- Cherie
- Hsiao Kuei Chien Kuei
- The Enchantress

== 1984 ==
- The Eight Diagram Pole Fighter
  - a.k.a. U.S. title: The Invincible Pole Fighters
- Secret Service of the Imperial Court
  - a.k.a. Pool of Blood
- Return of the Bastard Swordsman
- Prince Charming
- New Tales of the Flying Fox
- My Darling Genie
- Wits of the Brats
- An Amorous Woman of Tang Dynasty
- A Friend from Inner Space
- Hidden Power of Dragon Sabre
- The Siamese twins
- Love in a Fallen City (傾城之戀)
- Twin Bracelets
- Opium and the Kung-Fu Master
  - a.k.a. U.S. title: Lightning Fists of Shaolin
- Lust for the Love of a Chinese Courtesan
- Pale Passion
- Behind the Yellow Line
- Cute Little Fellow
- I Will Finally Knock You Down, Dad
- Thunderclap

== 1985 ==
- The Master Strikes Back
- Martial Arts of Shaolin
- Hong Kong Godfather
- Crazy Shaolin Disciples
- Let's Make Laugh 2
- The Flying Mr. B
- This Man Is Dangerous
- The Illegal Immigrant
- Danger Has 2 Faces
- Disciples of the 36th Chamber (Pi li shi jie)
  - a.k.a. U.S. title: Disciples of the Master Killer
- Girl with the Diamond Slipper
- Pursuit of a Killer
- My Name Ain't Suzie
- Puppy Love
- Let's Have Baby
- Young Vagabond
- How to Choose a Royal Bride
- Journey of the Doomed
- He Who Wanders All Alone

== 1988 ==
- Painted Faces (co-produced by Golden Harvest)
- Law Or Office

== 1989 ==
- Double Causes Trouble

== 1990 ==
- Look Out, Officer!

== 1992 ==
- Justice, My Foot!

== 1993 ==
- The Mad Monk

== 1994 ==
- Love on Delivery

== 1995 ==
- Loving You
- Out of the Dark

== 1996 ==
- The King of Masks

== 1997 ==
- Lifeline
- Hero

== 2003 ==
- Drunken Monkey

== 2009 ==
- Turning Point (co-produced with Television Broadcasts Limited)

== 2010 ==
- 72 Tenants of Prosperity (co-produced with Television Broadcasts Limited and Sil-Metropole Organisation)
- Perfect Wedding (co-produced with Television Broadcasts Limited and Sil-Metropole Organisation)
- The Jade and the Pearl (co-produced with Television Broadcasts Limited and Emperor Motion Pictures)

== 2011 ==
- I Love Hong Kong (co-produced with Television Braodacasts Limited, Mei Ah Film Production and Sil-Metropole Organisation)
- The Fortune Buddies (co-produced with Television Broadcasts Limited and Sil-Metropole Organisation)

== 2015 ==
- Triumph in the Skies

== 2016 ==
- Line Walker
- Shed Skin Papa

== 2019 ==
- Line Walker 2: Invisible Spy

== See also ==
List of film production companies
