= Angela Yu =

Angela Yu may refer to:

- Angela Yu Chien, Hong Kong actress
- Angela Yu (badminton), Australian badminton player
