= Chen Yanyan =

Chinese actress and film producer

- 陳燕燕
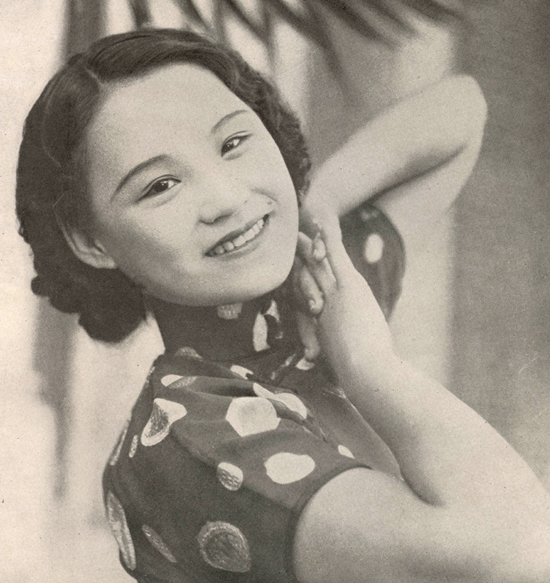
- Chen in 1950s
- Born: Chen Jianyan (陳煎燕); 12 January 1916; Ningbo, Zhejiang, China
- Died: 7 May 1999 (aged 83); Hong Kong
- Other name: Chen Yen-yen
- Known for: Chinese film actress
- Spouses: Huang Shaofen; Wang Hao
- Children: 1

Chen Yanyan (Chinese: 陳燕燕; Wade–Giles: Ch'en Yen-yen; 12 January 1916 – 7 May 1999), born Chen Jianyan, was a Chinese actress and film producer in the cinema of Republic of China (1912–1949), British Hong Kong and Taiwan.

== Life ==
Chen was born as Chen Jianyan in Ningbo, China in 1916. Chen was obsessed with films as a young girl. When she was 14 she visited the set of "Spring Dream in the Old Capital (故都春梦)" which the Lianhua Film Company was recording in Beijing. She returned each day after attending the Sacred Heart Girls School and struck up a conversation with Cai Chusheng who was to shortly direct his own films. She was given a chance to appear in the film as a screen test by the director Sun Yu. Her appearance was not included in the film as she had been cast as a prostitute and she looked too young for that to be acceptable. However the film was successful she was offered a job but it was only with great difficulty that she persuaded her father. The film company sent around one of their actresses, Lim Cho Cho, who was known for her integrity. Her father was persuaded but he insisted that she never discussed her work at home and that she would not use the family's name.

Chen left for Shanghai with her mother as a chaperone and within three years she was an acknowledged star known as "The Swallow" with a particular appeal to college students. Chen had a very good Mandarin accent which was useful as sound appeared in Chinese movies in the 1930s.

In 1932, she starred in her first film "Nanguo zhi Chun" 南国之春 (Springtime in the South). She also co-starred in the film Three Modern Women which told of three archetypal women competing for the love of the hero. The story was well received and in particular its left-wing approach.

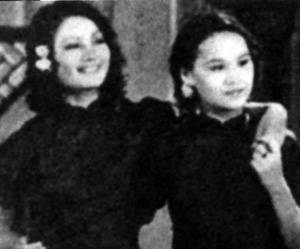
Li Lili and Chen in The Great Road

The 1934 film The Great Road is thought to have brought her star status when she played Dingxiang (Orchid). Hers is the last face to appear onscreen. This film also made a star of Li Lili and these two together with Ruan Lingyu and Wang Renmei were the female stars of the Lianhua film company.

In 1937, the war began in Shanghai and she soon married Huang Shaofen who was a cinematographer she had known for some years. They had a daughter, Wong Tin-lai (王天丽), but ended in divorce. She stayed in Shanghai and worked for the Xinhua Film Company where she again became a bankable star in their films.

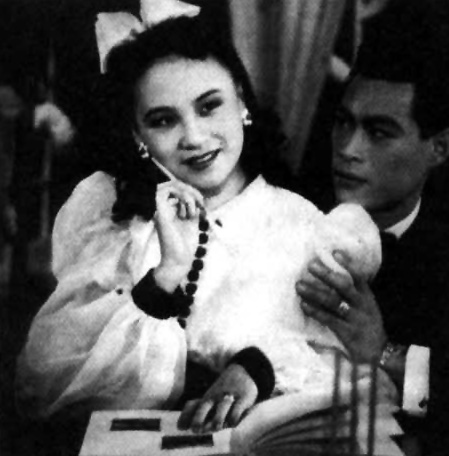
Chen in 1942's Wedding Night with Liu Qiong

In 1949, she moved and she co-founded her own company Haiyan Film Studio in Hong Kong with her second husband Wang Hao 王豪. The company made two films and the company ended at the same time as the marriage.

Chen produced two films herself, Love Fiesta, in 1957 and in 1961 Shark of the Pacific. She won a best supporting actress award in 1961 at the Asian Film Festival for her appearance in the 1961 film Misfortune. In 1963, she joined the Hong Kong-based Shaw Brothers Studio and she gained more award nominations for her acting.

Chen retired from films in 1972, but she still appeared on TV. In 1991, she appeared as herself in Center Stage which was a film about the short life of her fellow actress Ruan Lingyu.

Chen died in 1999.

== Filmography ==
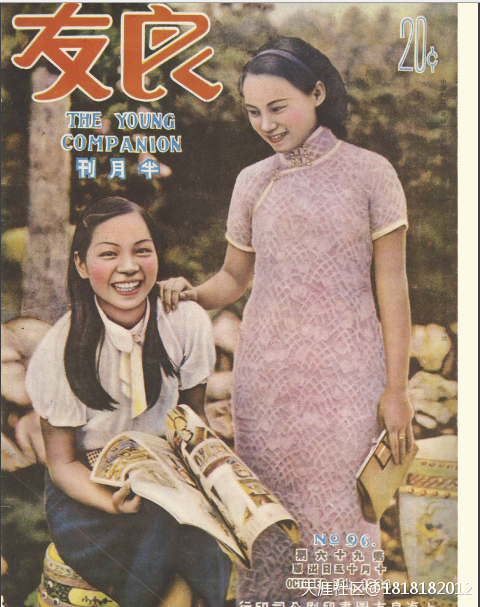
Cover of The Young Companion (October 1934) featuring Chen (standing) and Wang Renmei.

=== Film ===
Year	English title	Original title	Role	Notes
1930	Dream of the Ancient Capital	故都春夢		Lost
1930	Suicide Contract	自殺合同		Lost
1931	Love and Duty	戀愛與義務	Ping'er	
1931	A Spray of Plum Blossoms	一剪梅	A Qiao (Lucetta)	
1931	Two Stars in the Milky Way	銀漢雙星		
1932	Story of the South	南國之春	Li Xiaohong	
1932	Conscienceless	人道		Lost
1932	Answering the Nation's Call	共赴國難		Lost?
1932	Another Dream of the Ancient Capital	續故都春夢		Lost
1932	Struggling	奮鬥		
1933	Three Modern Women	三個摩登女性	Chen Ruoying	Lost
1933	New Year's Eve	除夕		Lost
1933	The Light of Maternal Instinct	母性之光	Shao Mei	
1934	Pear Flowers in Rainstorm	暴雨梨花		Lost
1934	The Iron Bird	鐵鳥		Lost
1934	The Kindred Feelings	骨肉之恩		Lost
1934	The Big Road	大路	Ding Xiang	
1935	The Evil Beauty	蛇蠍美人		Lost
1935	Song of China	天倫		
1935	A Fallen Goose by the Cold River	寒江落雁		
1936	A Heroic Girl	孤城烈女	Chen Yiyi	
1937	Lianhua Symphony	聯華交響曲		Segment 2: "Nightmare in Spring Chamber" (春閨斷夢)
1937	Spring Comes Everywhere	春到人間		
1937	Song of a Kind Mother	慈母曲		
1937	The Free World	自由天地		
1937	New and Old Times	新舊時代		
1937	Vistas of Art	藝海風光		Part 2: "Drama Troupe" (話劇團)
1938	A Beggar Girl	乞丐千金		
1938	Thunderstorm	雷雨		
1938	Four Concubines	四潘金蓮		
1939	A Legendary Pipa	琵琶記		
1939	Regrets of Life and Death	生死恨		
1939	The White Snake	白蛇傳		
1940	Legend of Sui Dynasty	隋宮春色		
1940	The Flower Girl	花魁女		
1940	Du Shiniang	杜十娘		
1940	A Ghost	女鬼		
1941	Bloody Tears Behind the Iron Window	鐵窗紅淚		
1941	Family	家		
1942	Wedding Night	洞房花燭夜		
1942	Standard Lady	標準夫人		
1942	Madame Butterfly	蝴蝶夫人		
1942	Compassion	博愛		
1942	Youth Passes in Vain	芳華虛度		
1943	Tide of Passion	情潮		
1943	Distant Longing	兩地相思		
1947	Wedding Candles	龍鳳花燭		
1947	Unending Love	不了情	Yu Jiayin	
1948	Destruction	天魔劫		
1948	Elusive	神出鬼沒		
1949	A Lingering Dream	巫山夢迴		
1953	Love Song	戀歌	Ge Ping	also producer
1953	The Magic World of Filmdom	銀海千秋		
1954	The Beautiful Ghost of the Sea	海角芳魂	He Yichun	also producer
1956	The Long Lane	長巷		
1957	Teenagers Folly	錦繡前程	Zhang Jiazhen	
1957	Love Fiesta	春色無邊		producer
1960	Nobody's Child	苦兒流浪記		
1960	The Iron Hoof of Oppression	鐵蹄下		
1960	Reunion	音容劫		
1961	Shark of the Pacific	大平洋之鯊		co-producer
1962	14000 Witnesses	一萬四千個證人		co-producer
1963	The Love Eterne	梁山伯與祝英台	Zhu Yingtai's mother	
1963	Bitter Sweet	為誰辛苦為誰忙		
1963	The Lady and the Thief	女人與小偷		
1963	Three Sinners	閰惜姣		
1964	Between Tears and Smiles	新啼笑姻緣		
1964	Lady General Hua Mu-lan	花木蘭	Hua Mu-lan's mother	
1964	The Crimson Palm	血手印		
1965	The Butterfly Chalice	蝴蝶盃		
1965	Son of Good Earth	大地兒女	Tian Degui's wife	
1965	The Grand Substitution	萬古流芳	Cheng Ying's wife	
1965	The Lotus Lamp	寶蓮燈		
1965	The West Chamber	西廂記	Cui Yingying's mother	
1966	The Blue and the Black	藍與黑	Mrs. Ji	Two-part film
1966	The Joy of Spring	歡樂青春		
1967	Auntie Lan	蘭姨	Jiang Wenlan's mother	
1967	The Goddess of Mercy	觀世音		
1967	Too Late for Love	烽火萬里情		
1967	Four Sisters	黛綠年華		
1967	Sing High, Sing Low	星月爭輝		
1967	One-Armed Swordsman	獨臂刀		
1967	My Dream Boat	船		
1968	Spring Blossoms	春暖花開		
1969	Dead End	死角	Zhang Chun's mother	
1969	The Three Smiles	三笑		
1970	Heads for Sale	女俠賣人頭		
1970	Sons and Daughters	千萬人家		
1970	Valley of the Fangs	餓狼谷		
1971	It Takes a Man to Be Henpecked	怕老婆是大丈夫		
1972	The Young Avenger	小毒龍		
1972	Trilogy of Swordsmanship	群英會		Segment 2: "The Tigress" (胭脂虎)
1972	The Merry Wife	娃娃夫人		
1972	Fists of Vengeance	鐵拳燕子飛		
1972	The 14 Amazons	十四女英豪	Geng Jinhua	
1972	Flower in the Rain	雨中花	Yuan Ping's mother	
1973	The Young Tiger	小老虎		
1974	The Thunder Kick	一網打盡		
1978	Mantis Combat	螳螂醉虎無影腳		
1982	Dark Trap	黑圈套		
1984	The Warmth of an Old House	頤園飄香		
1986	This Love of Mine	我的愛		

=== TV series ===
Year	English title	Original title	Role	Notes
1982	Journey	旅途		
1984	Stars of Last Night	昨夜星辰		
1984	Light Fog	輕霧		
