= The Crimson Palm =

1964 Hong Kong film by Chan Yau-San

The Crimson Palm (Xie shou yin)
- Directed by: Chan Yau-San
- Starring: Ivy Ling Po; Chin Ping; Li Ching; Chen Yen-yen; Cheng Miu
- Distributed by: Various worldwide
- Release date: 28 October 1964
- Country: Hong Kong

The Crimson Palm (血手印, pinyin: Xie shou yin, Cantonese: Huet sau yan) is a 1964 Hong Kong film directed by Chan Yau-San for Shaw Brothers.

== Plot ==
The father of Lin Shao-teh, a high court official, has betrothed him to the daughter of millionaire Wang Chun. Lin's father dies and the Lin family is impoverished. Lin Shao-teh Ivy Ling Po has to work as a water carrier to support his mother. Wang Chun calls Shao-teh to his house, forces him to annul the betrothal in exchange for some silver. Shao-teh is deeply hurt, agrees to the annulment, but refuses the money.

Wang Chun's daughter, Chien-king (Chin Ping), is a virtuous girl. When she hears about what her father has done, she refuses to obey him and vows to not marry anyone else. Chien-king sends her maid, Shuet Chun (Li Ching), to Shao-teh's house to console him. She also sends a parcel of clothes and some money. Shuet Chun tells Shao-teh to return to the Wang mansion that night to receive 100 taels of silver, as Chien-king wants to help Shao-teh with money enough to travel to take the Imperial exams. Shuet Chun also gives him a gold hairpin as a token for the messenger delivering the gold.

== Cast ==
- Ivy Ling Po as Lin Chao-Te
- Cheng Miu as Bao Zheng
- Chin Ping as Wang Chien-Chin
- Li Ching as Hsueh Chun
- Tang Ti as Minister Hsueh Chao
- Yui Kwang-Chao as Wang Chun
- Cheung Kwong-Chiu as Chang Pei-Tsan
- Chen Yen-yen as Mrs. Lin

== See also ==
- List of Shaw Brothers films
