= A Woman with Half Soul =

- Film poster
- Hangul: 반혼녀
- RR: Banhonnyeo
- MR: Panhonnyŏ
- Directed by: Shin Sang-ok
- Written by: Yu Il-su
- Produced by: Shim Tae-seon
- Starring: Li Ching; Lee Seung-yong
- Cinematography: Choi Seung-woo
- Music by: Jeong Yoon-joo
- Production company: Shin Films
- Release date: 1 December 1973
- Running time: 90 minutes
- Country: South Korea
- Language: Korean

A Woman with Half Soul (Banhonnyeo), also known as The Ghost Lovers (Yan nu huan hun, 艷女還魂), is a 1973 South Korean horror film directed by Shin Sang-ok and starring Li Ching and Lee Seung-yong.

== Plot ==
Han Do-ryeong goes to Yeon-hwa's house with the money, but is taken away by bandits and ends up staying at the house of Jang-soe, an old servant. The spirit of Yeon-hwa, who died without seeing her spouse Han Doryeong, appears to Han Doryeong every night and shares her unfulfilled feelings in this world. When Jangsoe sees his master playing with a ghost, he calls a shaman to perform an exorcism and attaches a talisman, but to no avail. In the end, Han Do-ryeong comes to her senses and distances herself from Yeon-hwa's spirit, but at Yeon-hwa's request, after sharing the last couple's affection, Yeon-hwa escapes from the bondage of the wandering ghost and goes to the underworld.

== Cast ==
- Li Ching- Yeon-hwa
- Lee Seung-yong - Han Do-ryeong
- Kim Mu-yeong - Jangsoe
- Joo Young -wife of Jangsoe
- Go Seon-ae -Dalae the nanny
- Kim Ki-ju -merchant
- Lee Hyang-ja - Yeonsim, Yeonhwa's sister
- Sin Chan-il -NamPyong, Husband of Yeonsim
- Jin Bong-jin -Chunam
- Lee Seung-il - Dok chil
