= Li Ching (actress) =

Hong Kong actress (1948–2018)

- 李菁
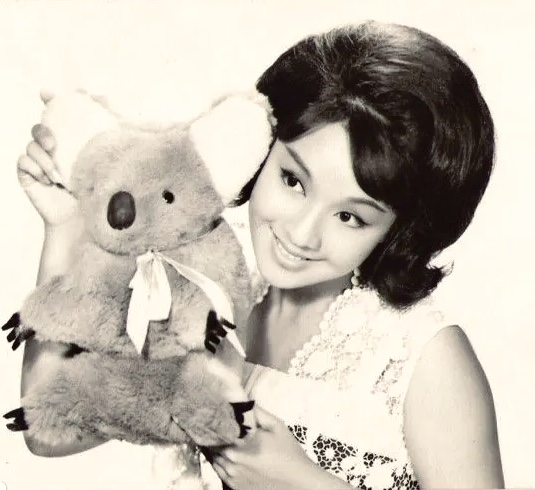
- Portrait of Li
- Born: Li Guo-ying; 8 November 1948; Shanghai, Republic of China
- Died: 22 February 2018 (aged 69); Quarry Bay, Hong Kong
- Other name: Lee Ching
- Education: Precious Blood Secondary School
- Occupations: Actress; producer
- Years active: 1964–1983
- Partner: Lui Kok-wah (1969–1979)

Li Ching (Chinese: 李菁; pinyin: Lǐ Jīng; born Li Guo-ying (simplified Chinese: 李国瑛; traditional Chinese: 李國瑛; pinyin: Lǐguóyīng); 8 November 1948 – 22 February 2018), was a prominent Hong Kong actress and producer from the early 1960s to the late 1970s.

== Early life ==
Born in Shanghai as Li Guo-ying on 8 November 1948. Her parents moved to British Hong Kong in 1949. She was the youngest in her family, with 5 older brothers and 2 older sisters. From a young age, she was interested in films. While attending Precious Blood Girls' School, she learnt that Shaw Brothers Southern Experimental Drama Troupe was openly recruiting for its second group of trainees. Despite her parents' opposition, she was determined to audition. Over 2,000 people applied, but Li's fresh appearance and natural acting talent earned her a spot. She was selected along with Fang Ying, Chiang Ching, Cheng Pei-pei, and Chin Pin, becoming classmates. During this period, she made cameo appearances in The Love Eterne and The Female Prince.

== Career ==
After graduating from the training class, she signed an 8-year contract with Shaw Brothers. Initially, she was cast in costume roles, playing supporting characters in films such as The Crimson Palm, The Lotus Lamp, and Inside the Forbidden City; but her big break came when she was finally offered her first starring role as the Carp Spirit / Peong in The Mermaid alongside Ivy Ling Po.

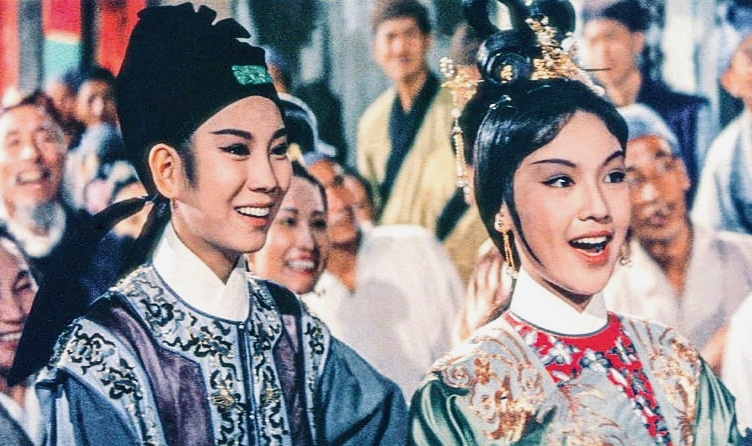
Li and Ivy Ling Po in The Mermaid (1965)

In May 1965, Li won Best Actress at the 12th Asian Film Festival for her performance in The Mermaid. Since she was not yet 17 at the time, she was dubbed the "Baby Queen of Asian Cinema".

In 1967, her performance in Susanna, her first modern romantic drama, received critical acclaim which further solidified her reputation. Following that, Shaw Brothers carefully planned her rise to stardom, producing a series of new films for her that consistently broke box office records.

In the early 1970s, Li's film Have Sword, Will Travel - beside the actors Ti Lung and David Chiang - ranked as the 6th highest grossing film of the year; and by 1969, she had appeared in more than 20 films. Except for a 6-month break in 1969 due to a fractured left leg, Li was almost constantly filming, completing numerous Huangmei opera movies. During her time at Shaw Brothers, she appeared in around 50 films, including Chang Cheh's Dead End, King Eagle, and The New One-Armed Swordsman. She was also considered one of the "Top 10 Actress in Hong Kong Cinema", and became one of the most sought-after actresses in both Hong Kong and Taiwan.

At the end of 1976, Li ended her 13-year relationship with Shaw Brothers and began working as a freelance actress, travelling between Hong Kong and Taiwan. She also co-founded the Changtian Company with director Lo Ma and starred in their debut film, The Chase. Li eventually announced her retirement as an actress in 1983, after appearing in more than 60 films.

== Personal life and death ==
At the peak of her career, she was described to be a compassionate soul, and quite energetic. Giving out advice to those who just debuted and inviting her friends to her home frequently after a long day of work. But tragedy struck in 1979, when her long-time boyfriend, Lui Kok-Wah, the eldest son of the Lui family and an heir to the Kowloon Motor Bus company, died after a 10-year relationship. This deeply affected her, leading to a gradual reduction in her film work. Her mother, who had been by her side for many years, died in 1983. This impacted Li immensely, and she completely withdrew from the entertainment industry.

In the 1990s, Li disappeared from the public eye. It was believed that she had lost her fortune to gambling and stock investments, and reduced herself to living alone in cheap rental apartments. There were also reports that she was embroiled in a long-running court dispute with a landlord over unpaid rent. Even when Shaw Brothers digitally remastered and released their films in 2013, she did not make an appearance.

On February 22, 2018, she was found dead in her rented apartment in Quarry Bay, Hong Kong. Apparently, her neighbours smelt a rotten stench coming from her apartment, and called the firefighters to investigate. It turned out that her body had been decomposing for several days. She was 69 years old. Her co-stars paid for her funeral expenses and memorials.

== Filmography ==
=== Films ===
- 1964 Between Tears and Smiles
- 1964 The Dancing Millionairess (Wan hua ying chun) as Chorus girl
- 1964 The Last Woman of Shang (Da ji)
- 1964 The Story of Sue San
- 1964 The Crimson Palm (Xie shou yin)
- 1964 The Female Prince as Chun Lan
- 1965 Inside the Forbidden City as Ghost of Kou Zhu
- 1965 The Mermaid as Chin Mu-tan/Pipo fairy
- 1965 The Lotus Lamp (Bai lian deng) as Lingzhi
- 1965 The West Chamber (Xi xiang ji) as Hongniang
- 1966 Sweet and Wild (Ye gu niang) as Jin Xiao-fang
- 1966 The Knight Of Knights (Wen Suchen) as Sister Yu Chin-erh
- 1967 Sweet is Revenge (Da xia fu chou ji)
- 1967 Nu xun an as Huo Ting-chin
- 1967 Jing jing as Ching-ching
- 1967 The King with My Face as Princess Hui Hsi
- 1967 Swan Song
- 1967 Susanna as Lin Shan-Shan
- 1967 Rape of the Sword (Dao jian) as Zhong Jiao Long
- 1967 Lady Jade Locket as Lien Suo/Lien Wei
- 1968 Hong Kong Rhapsody as Chang Hsiao-Ping
- 1968 The Sword of Swords as Pai Feng
- 1969 Hao xia zhuan (Killers Five)
- 1969 The Invincible Fist as Kuei Ku
- 1969 Dead End as Wen You
- 1969 The Three Smiles (San xiao) as Chiu Hsiang
- 1969 Have Sword, Will Travel as Yun Piau Piau
- 1970 Nu xiao chun se as Helen Li Hai-lun
- 1970 A Place to Call Home (Yu nu qin qing)
- 1970 E lang gu
- 1971 King Eagle as 7th Chief Yuk Lin/8th Chief An Bing Er
- 1971 The New One-Armed Swordsman as Pa Hsiao
- 1971 Vengeance of a Snow Girl as Shen Ping Hung
- 1971 The Long Chase as Wang Hsueh Niang
- 1972 The Human Goddess
- 1972 Wa wa fu ren
- 1972 The 14 Amazons as Yang Pa Mei
- 1972 Wang ming tu
- 1973 A Woman with Half Soul
- 1973 Niu gui she shen
- 1973 Ambush as Fan Hsiu-hsiu
- 1973 Sexy Girls of Denmark (Dan Ma jiao wa)
- 1973 Dang nu ji hang
- 1974 Gui ma xiao tian shi
- 1974 Yan nu huan hun as Sung Lien-hua
- 1974 Heung gong chat sup sam
- 1974 Sorrow of the Gentry as Sun Shu-cheng
- 1975 That's Adultery
- 1975 Jin mao shi wang as Wen Fang
- 1975 Shuang xing ban yue
- 1975 Xi xiao nu ma
- 1975 Evil Seducers (Guest star)
- 1975 My Bewitched Wife as Fox Fairy Hu Hsiao-hsin
- 1975 Qing suo
- 1975 Lover's Destiny
- 1976 Tiger Cliff
- 1976 Wedding Nights as Chan Hsien-hsien
- 1976 Hu tian hu di as Fox Fairy Hu Hsiao-hsin
- 1976 Mr. Funnybone as Miss Chen
- 1977 Clans of Intrigue as Black Pearl Hei Chen-chu
- 1977 Heroes of the Eastern Skies
- 1978 Xin hong lou meng as Hsieh Bao-Chai
- 1978 Zhui
