= Between Tears and Laughter =

1964 film by Lo Chen

- Film poster
- Traditional Chinese: 故都春夢
- Literal meaning: happy/sad predestined marriage
- Hanyu Pinyin: Gù Dū Chūn Mèng
- Directed by: Lo Chen; Doe Ching; Hsieh Chun; Ho Meng Hua; Wang Hsing-Lai; Wen Shih-Ling; Yen Chun; Yueh Feng
- Written by: Chin Hung; Tu Wei
- Produced by: Run Run Shaw
- Starring: Li Li-Hua; Kwan Shan; Ivy Ling Po
- Cinematography: Liu Chi; Wu Cho-Hua; Charles Tung Shao-Yung
- Edited by: Chiang Hsing-Lung
- Music by: Wang Fu-Ling
- Distributed by: Shaw Brothers Studio
- Release date: 17 January 1964
- Running time: 137 minutes
- Country: Hong Kong
- Language: Mandarin
- Budget: HK$ 1,200,000

Between Tears and Laughter (also known as Between Tears and Smiles) is a 1964 Hong Kong drama film directed by the Shaw Scenario & Direction Group (which included Lo Chen, Doe Ching, Hsieh Chun, Ho Meng Hua, Wang Hsing-Lai, Wen Shih-Ling, Yen Chun and Yueh Feng). Set in Republican-era Peking (Beiping), the story revolves around a college student (Kwan Shan) and three young women: a wealthy daughter of a government bureaucrat, a traditional singer in a band (both portrayed by Li Li-Hua) and a street kung-fu/acrobat performer (Ivy Ling Po).

The film was selected as the Hong Kong entry for the Best Foreign Language Film at the 37th Academy Awards, but was not accepted as a nominee.

== Cast ==
- Diana Chang Chung Wen
- Paul Chang
- Chen Li-li
- Chen Yen-yen
- Chiang Kuang Chao
- Chin Han
- Chin Ping
- Ching Miao as General
- Fan Mei Sheng
- Fang Yin
- Feng Yi
- Kao Pao-shu
- Han Ying-Chieh
- Peter Chen Ho
- Julia Hsia
- Margaret Hsing
- King Hu
- Kao Chao
- Kao Yuen
- Carrie Ku Mei
- Ku Feng as Taoist priest
- Kwan Shan
- Lan Wei Lieh
- Lee Ching
- Li Kun
- Li Li-Hua
- Li Ting
- Li Ying
- Li Yunzhong
- Ivy Ling Po
- Ouyang Sha-fei
- Peng Peng
- Tien Feng
- Pat Ting Hung
- Margaret Tu Chuan
- Wang Hao
- Allison Chang Yen
- Angela Yu Chien
- Yu Wen-hua

== Awards ==
Year	Award	Category	Name	Result
1965	3rd Golden Horse Awards	Golden Horse Award for Best Leading Actress	Li Li-hua	Won
1965	3rd Golden Horse Awards	Golden Horse Award for Best Supporting Actor	Ching Miao	Won

== See also ==
- List of submissions to the 37th Academy Awards for Best Foreign Language Film
- List of Hong Kong submissions for the Academy Award for Best Foreign Language Film
