= Ku Feng =

Hong Kong actor (1930–2025)

- 谷峰
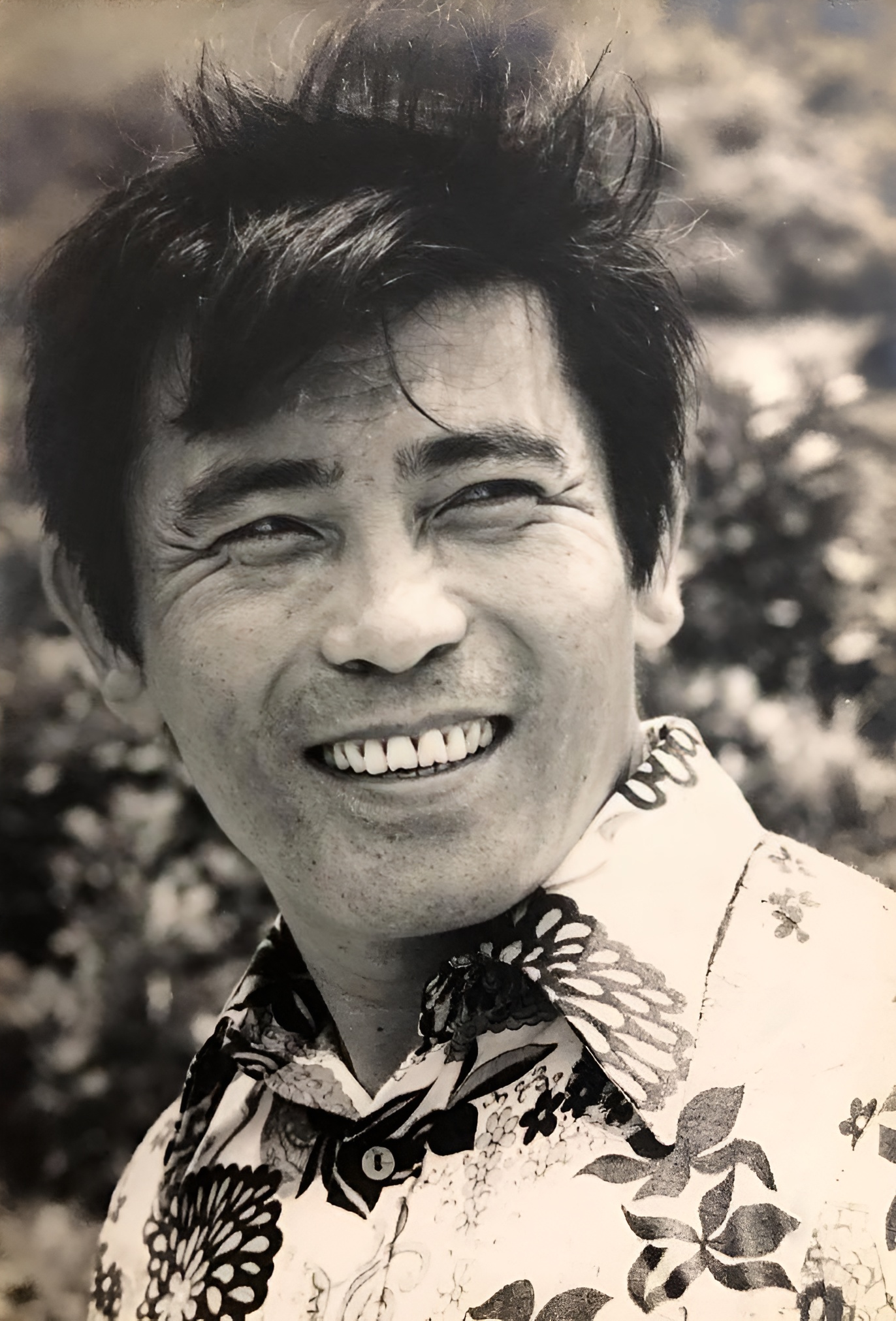
- Born: Chan Sze-man; 3 July 1930; Shanghai, China
- Died: 27 March 2025 (aged 94); Hong Kong
- Occupation: Actor
- Years active: 1959–2025
- Awards: Golden Horse Awards – Best Supporting Actor; 1982 Tiger Killer

Chinese name
- Chinese: 谷峰
Transcriptions
Standard Mandarin
- Hanyu Pinyin: Gǔ Fēng
Yue: Cantonese
- Jyutping: Guk^{1} Fung^{1}

Chan Sze-man
- Traditional Chinese: 陳思文
- Simplified Chinese: 陈思文
Transcriptions
Standard Mandarin
- Hanyu Pinyin: Chén Sīwén
Yue: Cantonese
- Jyutping: Can^{4} Si^{1}-man^{4}

Chan Sze-man (3 July 1930 – 27 March 2025), better known by his stage name Ku Feng, was a Hong Kong actor.

== Background ==
Feng studied in Beijing, and appeared in hundreds of films, many of which were produced by the Shaw Brothers Studio. He died on 27 March 2025, at the age of 94.

== Filmography ==
=== Film ===
Year	Title	Role	Notes
1959	Jiao Wa (嬌娃)		
1963	The Love Eterne (梁山伯與祝英台)		opera film
1963	The Adulteress (楊乃武與小白菜)		opera film
1963	Love Parade (花團錦簇)		
1964	Between Tears and Smiles (新啼笑姻緣)	Taoist priest	extra
1964	The Dancing Millionairess (萬花迎春)		
1964	The Shepherd Girl (山歌戀)		
1964	Comedy of Mismatches (喬太守亂點鴛鴦譜)		opera film
1964	The Warlord and the Actress (血濺牡丹紅)		
1964	A Story of Three Loves (啼笑姻緣)		Segment 1 only
1965	Pink Tears (痴情淚)		
1965	The Lark (小雲雀)		
1965	Vermillion Door (紅伶淚)		
1965	Sons of Good Earth (大地兒女)	Japanese adjutant	extra
1965	The Lotus Lamp (寶蓮燈)		
1965	Squadron 77 (七七敢死隊)		
1965	Fairy, Ghost, Vixen (聊齋誌異)		
1965	The Twin Swords (鴛鴦劍俠)		
1965	Temple of the Red Lotus (江湖奇俠)		
1966	The Monkey Goes West (西遊記)		
1966	Princess Iron Fan (鐵扇公主)		
1966	Come Drink with Me (大醉俠)		
1966	Magnificent Trio (邊城三俠)		
1966	The Golden Buddha (金菩薩)		
1966	A Debt of Blood (亂世兒女)		
1966	The Blue and the Black (藍與黑)	Mr. Pien	2-part film series, Part 2 only
1966	The Knights of Knights (文素臣)		
1967	The Midnight Murder (三更寃)	Zhu Wu	opera film
1967	The Thunderous Sword (神劍震江湖)		
1967	The Sword and the Lute (琴劍恩仇)		
1967	The Dragon Creek (龍虎溝)	Niu Er	
1967	Kiss and Kill (風流鐵漢)		
1967	Operation Lipstick (網嬌娃)		
1967	Hong Kong Nocturne (香江花月夜)	Janitor at ballet school	
1967	Angel with the Iron Fist (鐵觀音)		
1967	Black Falcon (黑鷹)		
1967	Sweet is Revenge (大俠復仇記)		
1967	One-Armed Swordsman (獨臂刀)	Fang Cheng	
1967	Rape of the Sword (盜劍)		
1967	Summons to Death (催命符)		
1967	Inter-Pol (特警零零九)		
1968	Killer Darts (追魂鏢)		
1968	The Bells of Death (奪魂鈴)		
1968	Golden Swallow (金燕子)		
1968	Gun Brothers (千面大盜)		
1968	The Angel Strikes Again (鐵觀音勇破爆炸黨)		
1968	Black Butterfly (女俠黑蝴蝶)		
1968	That Fiery Girl (紅辣椒)		
1968	The Jade Raksha (玉羅剎)		
1969	Return of the One-Armed Swordsman (獨臂刀王)		
1969	The Flying Dagger (飛刀手)		
1969	The Invincible Fist (鐵手無情)		
1969	The Golden Sword (龍門金劍)		
1969	Raw Passions (裸血)		
1969	Dragon Swamp (毒龍潭)		
1969	Have Sword, Will Travel (保鏢)		
1969	Killers Five (豪俠傳)		
1969	Torrent of Desire (慾燄狂流)		
1969	Killers		
1970	The Golden Knight (金衣大俠)		
1970	Vengeance (報仇)	Feng Kaishan	
1970	Ripples (一池春水)		
1970	My Son (春火)		
1970	Brothers Five (五虎屠龍)	Wan Bufu	
1970	A Taste of Cold Steel (武林風雲)		
1970	The Twelve Gold Medallions (十二金牌)		
1970	The Heroic Ones (十三太保)	Li Keyong	
1970	The Singing Killer (小煞星)		
1971	The New One-Armed Swordsman (新獨臂刀)		
1971	The Jade Faced Assassin (玉面俠)	Lian Lanyan	
1971	The Duel (大決鬥)	Tang Renlin	
1971	The Golden Seal (金印仇)		
1971	The Shadow Whip (影子神鞭)		
1971	The Crimson Charm (血符門)		
1971	The Anonymous Heroes (無名英雄)	Brother Wan	
1971	Duel of Fists (拳擊)	Cannon	
1971	Vengeance of a Snow Girl (冰天俠女)		
1971	The Deadly Duo (雙俠)		
1972	The Killer (大殺手)	Japanese samurai	
1972	The Fugitive (亡命徒)		
1972	Boxer from Shantung (馬永貞)		
1972	Trilogy of Swordsmanship (群英會)	Luo Tianyi	Segment 3: "White Water Strand" (白水灘)
1972	The Water Margin (水滸傳)	Song Jiang	
1972	The Black Tavern (黑店)		
1973	The Master of Kung Fu (黃飛鴻)		
1973	The House of 72 Tenants (七十二家房客)		
1973	Tales of Larceny (牛鬼蛇神)		Segment 1 only
1973	River of Fury (江湖行)		
1973	Illicit Desire (風流韻事)		Segment 3 only
1973	The Happiest Moment (一樂也)		
1973	Qing Kung		
1974	Sinful Confession (聲色犬馬)		
1974	Five Tough Guys (五大漢)		
1974	Hong Kong 73 (香港73)		
1974	Scandal (醜聞)		
1974	Black Hair (黑髮)		
1975	The Flying Guillotine (血滴子)		
1975	The Empress Dowager (傾國傾城)		
1975	Gambling Syndicate (惡霸)		
1975	All Men Are Brothers (蕩寇誌)	Song Jiang	
1975	Black Magic (降頭)		
1975	All Mixed Up (搭錯線)		
1975	The Imposter (七面人)		
1975	That's Adultery! (捉姦趣事)		Segment 2 only
1975	Temperament of Life (嬉笑怒罵)		
1975	Forbidden Tales of Two Cities (港澳傳奇)		
1975	Devil Bride (攝青鬼)		
1976	Killer Clans (流星蝴蝶劍)		
1976	Wedding Nights (洞房艷事)		
1976	The Condemned (死囚)		
1976	The Magic Blade (天涯明月刀)		
1976	The Dragon Missile (飛龍斬)		
1976	Love Swindlers (騙財騙色)		Segment 1 only
1976	Shaolin Temple (少林寺)		
1976	Oily Maniac (油鬼子)		
1976	The Web of Death (五毒天羅)		
1976	Erotic Nights (色香味)		
1976	King Gambler (賭王大騙局)		
1976	The Criminals (香港奇案)		Segment 3 only
1977	Clans of Intrigue (楚留香)	Leng Qiuhun	
1977	Jade Tiger (白玉老虎)		
1977	The Dream of the Red Chamber (金玉良緣紅樓夢)		
1977	The Mighty Peking Man (猩猩王)		
1977	Death Duel (三少爺的劍)		
1977	Whirlwind Kick (旋風踢)		
1977	The Brave Archer (射鵰英雄傳)	Hong Qigong	
1977	Judgement of an Assassin (決殺令)		
1977	The Sentimental Swordsman (多情劍客無情劍)		
1977	Last Strike (被迫)		
1977	The 36 Crazy Fists (三十六迷形拳)		
1977	Soul Brothers of Kung Fu (被迫)	Chin Shi Po	
1977	Moods of Love (風花雪月)		
1978	Flying Guillotine 2 (清宮大刺殺)		
1978	The Psychopath (色慾殺人王)		
1978	Dynamo (不擇手段)		
1978	The Vengeful Beauty (血芙蓉)		
1978	The Brave Archer 2 (射鵰英雄傳續集)	Hong Qigong	
1978	Godfather's Fury (爛鬼與車頭)		
1978	Five Deadly Venoms (五毒)		
1978	Sensual Pleasures (子曰:食色性也)		
1978	The Avenging Eagle (冷血十三鷹)		
1978	Double-Cross (獅子頭玻璃肚)		
1978	Special Hand		
1978	Bruce Le's Greatest Revenge (湮報復)		
1978	The Proud Youth (笑傲江湖)	Master Bai	
1978	Soul of the Sword (殺絕)		
1979	Bruce and the Iron Finger (大教頭與騷娘子)		
1979	The Deadly Breaking Sword (風流斷劍小小刀)		
1979	The Brothers (差人大佬搏命仔)		
1979	Jeet Kune the Claws and the Supreme Kung Fu (截拳鷹爪功)		
1979	My Kung Fu Twelve Kicks (十二潭腿)		
1979	The Kung-Fu Instructor (教頭)		
1979	Life Gamble (生死鬥)		
1979	Crack Shadow Boxers (盲拳怪招)		
1979	To Kill a Mastermind (七煞)		
1979	Return of the Dead (銷魂玉)		
1979	Ten Tigers of Kwantung (廣東十虎與後五虎)		
1979	Four Invincibles (四大跛拳)		
1979	Fists, Kicks and the Evils (鶴拳)		
1979	Ruthless Revenge (刁禽雙絕)		
1980	Shaolin Disciple (少林佛家大道)		
1980	Heroes Shed No Tears (英雄無淚)		
1980	High Price (有料到)		
1980	Killer Constable (萬人斬)	Fang Feng	
1980	Two Champions of Shaolin		
1980	The Kid with a Tattoo (通天小子紅槍客)		
1980	Rendezvous with Death (請帖)		
1980	Bat without Wings (無翼蝙蝠)		
1980	The Shaolin Kid		
1980	Chuk Fung Lin Wan Tui (旋風連環腿)		
1980	The Star, the Rogue & the Kung Fu Kid (武師,花旦,大流氓)		
1980	The Desperate Trio (爛命一條)		
1981	Return of the Sentimental Swordsman (魔劍俠情)		
1981	The Furious Killer (金殺手)		
1981	Big Brother (教兄)		
1981	Revenge of the Corpse (飛屍)		
1981	The Emperor and His Brother (書劍恩仇錄)	Zhou Zhongying	
1981	Martial Club (武館)	Wong Chi-Ying	
1981	The Great Cheat (王牌大老千)		
1981	The King of Gambler (賭王鬥千王)		
1981	The Imperial Sword Killing the Devil (御劍伏魔)		
1981	Big Boss (頂爺)		
1982	Gang Master (幫規)		
1982	The 82 Tenants (八十二家房客)		
1982	Passing Flickers (三十年細說從頭)		
1982	Perils of the Sentimental Swordsman (楚留香之幽靈山莊)		
1982	Tiger Killer (武松)		
1982	Godfather from Canton (搏盡)		
1982	The Emperor and the Minister (乾隆皇君臣鬥智)		
1982	My Rebellious Son (小子有種)		
1982	The Stunning Gambling (賭王千王群英會)		
1983	The Lady Assassin (清宮啟示錄)		
1983	The Roving Swordsman (大俠沈勝衣)		
1983	Shaolin Prince (少林傳人)		
1983	Tales of a Eunuch (鹿鼎記)		
1983	The Lady is the Boss (掌門人)		
1983	The Home at Hong Kong (家在香港)		
1983	Shaolin Intruders (三闖少林)		
1983	Send in the Clowns (台上台下)		
1983	Little Dragon Maiden (楊過與小龍女)	Hong Qigong	
1983	The Supreme Swordsman (老鷹的劍)		
1983	Take Care, Your Majesty! (皇帝保車)		
1984	Comedy (馬後砲)		
1984	Family Light Affair (城市之光)		
1984	Maybe It's Love (窺情)		
1984	Before Dawn (第8站)		
1984	The Hidden Power of the Dragon Sabre (魔殿屠龍)		
1984	Secret Service of the Imperial Court (錦衣衛)	Zhao Wuyi	
1984	Misfire (走火炮)		
1984	Hong Kong 1941 (等待黎明)		
1984	Thunderclap (霹靂雷電)		
1984	Power of Fist Fight (致命金剛拳)		
1984	North South West East (北南西東)		
1984	An Amorous Woman of Tang Dynasty (唐朝豪放女)		
1985	The Master Strikes Back (教頭發威)		
1985	Oh, My God (超齡處男)		
1985	City Hero (飛虎奇兵)		
1985	Royal ? People (皇家?民)		
1985	Crocodile Hero (龍譚大鱷)		
1985	How to Choose a Royal Bride (天官賜福)		
1985	Young Vagabond (少年蘇乞兒)		
1986	Parking Service (代客泊車)		
1986	Sweet Surrender (我要金龜婿)		
1986	Devoted to You (痴心的我)		
1986	New Mr. Vampire (殭屍翻生)		
1986	Peking Opera Blues (刀馬旦)	Commander Liu	
1986	The Story of Dr Sun Yat-Sen (國父孫中山與開國英雄)		
1986	Brotherhood (兄弟)		
1986	Blood Sorcery (凶咒)		
1986	Legacy of Rage (龍在江湖)		
1987	Magnificent Warriors (中華戰士)		
1987	Four Robbers (四大天王)		
1987	Porky's Meatballs (鬼馬校園)		
1987	Easy Money (通天大盜)		
1987	You OK, I'm OK (你OK，我OK!)		
1987	Amnesty Decree (魔鬼天使)		
1987	The Missing People (失蹤人口)		
1987	The Wrong Couples (不是冤家不聚頭)		
1988	Fury (情義心)		
1988	The Devil & the Ghostbuster (艷鬼凶靈)		
1988	The Devil Sorcery (半暹降)		
1988	Chicken and Duck Talk (雞同鴨講)		
1988	The Dragon Family (龍之家族)	Ho E	
1988	Hero of Tomorrow (江湖接班人)		cameo
1988	Love Ma and Dad (又見冤家)		
1988	Devil's Curse (猛鬼咒)		
1988	Ghost's Hospital (猛鬼醫院)		
1988	Classmate Party (嘩鬼學校)		
1988	Spirit vs Zombi (殭屍大鬧西門町)		
1988	Spiritual Princeling (幽靈王子)		
1988	Ge Bi Ban De Nan Sheng (隔壁班的男生)		
1989	Bloody Brotherhood (同根生)		
1989	Darkside of Chinatown (西雅圖大屠殺)		
1989	Wild Search (伴我闖天涯)	Lee	
1989	Just Heroes (義膽群英)		
1989	Reincarnation of Golden Lotus (潘金蓮之前世今生)		
1989	China White (轟天龍虎會)		
1989	Underground Warfare (地下風雲)		
1990	Demoness from Thousand Years (千年女妖)		cameo
1990	Return Engagement (再戰江湖)		
1990	A Home Too Far (異域)	Li Mi	
1990	Day of Thunder (金牌雙龍)		
1990	Generation Consultant (諸葛孔明)		
1990	A Chinese Ghost Story II (倩女幽魂II人間道)		
1990	Generation Pendragon (一代梟雄曹操)	Lu Su	
1990	Angel or Whore (玄女幽魂)		
1990	Gamblers Heavenly Made (賭王三虎將)		
1990	Forbidden Imperial Tales (嫁到宮中的男人)		
1990	Da Xiao Bing Tuan (大笑兵團)		
1991	Legend of the Drunken Tiger (醉俠行)		
1991	The Banquet (豪門夜宴)	Guest at the banquet	
1991	Ghost for Sale (捉鬼專門店)		
1991	Guys in Ghost Hand (鬼整人)		
1991	Ghost Story of Kam Ping Mui (聊齋金瓶梅)		
1991	The Ultimate Vampire (彊屍至尊)		
1991	Devil Gambler (賭魔)		cameo
1991	Devil and Master (妖女鬥師公)		
1991	Yellow Rain		
1991	Red Lips (滾滾紅唇)		
1991	The Dignified Killers (至尊殺手)		
1991	Young Soldiers (娃娃兵)		
1991	Bewitched Area of Thousand Years (千年魔界)		
1991	Golden Venom (金蠶降)		
1991	Affrighted Romance (聊齋驚艷)		
1992	Fist of Fury 1991 II (漫畫威龍)		
1992	The Spiritual Love (聊齋之慾焰三娘子)		
1992	The Pearl Of Oriental (風流家族)		
1992	Ghost Killer (俾鬼玩)		
1992	Legend of Wong Tai Sin (黃大仙)		
1992	Four Dragons (四海遊俠)		
1992	Sex And Curse (禁房艷奇)		cameo
1992	Lover's Tear (誓不忘情)		
1992	Queen of Gambler (女賭神)		
1992	Arrest The Restless (藍江傳之反飛組風雲)		
1992	Cageman (籠民)	Luk Tung	
1992	Guys In Ghost Hand		
1992	Suburb Murder (香港姦殺奇案)		
1992	No Guilty (男兒無菲)		
1992	Gambling Soul (賭鬼)		
1992	Revenge of Scar Face (辣手梟雄)		
1992	Secret Police (警網雄風)		
1992	Gambling Ghost Are Ready (賭鬼總動員)		
1992	Woman Gamble God		
1992	Killer Flower (浪子殺手霸王花)		
1992	Liu Jai Fool Sex		
1992	Behind The Curtain (賭命夕陽)		
1992	Long Hot Summer (夏月狂情)		cameo
1992	Sex of Female (1992女性寶鑒)		
1992	Lucky Way (大八掛)		
1993	Astray Lamb (玉女性重傷)		
1993	Don't Call Me Gigolo (住家舞男)		
1993	The Widow (風情萬種野玫瑰)		
1993	Black Magic (屍蠱艷譚)		
1993	Happy Partner (人鬼搭檔)		
1993	Rose Rose I Love You (玫瑰玫瑰我愛你)		
1993	A Serious Shock! Yes Madam! (末路狂花)		
1993	The Tigers: The Legend of Canton (廣東五虎之鐵拳無敵孫中山)		
1993	Sex Flower (慾海花)		
1994	Hail the Judge (九品芝麻官白面包青天)		
1994	The Tragic Fantasy - Tiger of Wanchai (醉生夢死的灣仔之虎)	Uncle Kau	
1994	Hunting List (終極獵殺)		
1994	The Jail of No Return (死亡監獄)		
1994	One Night Stand (風流一夜情)		cameo
1994	Wai's Romance (性愛韋小寶之玩女大王)		
1994	1941 Hong Kong on Fire (香港淪陷)		
1994	Urban Cop (特警神龍)		
1995	The Vengeance		
1995	Kam Ping Mui of Deep Throat (聊齋金瓶梅之深喉)		
1995	Lover of the Last Empress (慈禧秘密生活)		
1995	Home Again (祖屋)		
1995	Gunmen (失鎗神探)		
1995	Sun Valley	old man	
1995	Life of Crime (罪惡人生)		
1995	Little Heroes Lost in China (小鬼奇兵)		
1995	Hope (信有明天)		
1995	Dark Tale (山中艷譚)		
1996	War of the Underworld (洪興仔之江湖大風暴)		
1996	Days in Guangzhou (珠江恩仇記)		
1996	The Gangsters (江湖情仇)		
1996	Another Chinese Cop (中國O記之血腥情人)		
1997	Mahjong Dragon (麻雀飛龍)		
1997	Challenge (挑戰)		
1997	Crazy Mission (街頭悍將)		
1998	Cheap Killers (愈墮落愈英雄)		
1998	Pathbreaker (1998之闖將)		
1999	City Hunter (新城獵人)		
1999	Painting with Human Skin (人皮屍畫)		
2000	990714.com (網上怪談)		
2000	See No Evil (奪命屋)		
2000	Evil Obsession (魔劫)		
2000	Conspiracy (赤裸紅唇)		
2000	Storm Killer (風雲毒玫瑰)		
2000	The Bottle (倩女玻璃樽)		
2000	Bye Honey (著草走佬做大佬)		
2001	Ghost Story: Horrible Tea (陰司路之孟婆茶)		
2001	Lethal Justice (雷霆幹探)		
2001	Goodbye Mr. Cool (九龍冰室)		
2002	Return from the Other World (賭神之神)		
2002	Pauline's Life (絕代艷星寶蓮的一生)		
2002	Distinctive (動物凶靈)		
2003	Night Corridor (妖夜迴廊)		
2004	Mysterious Hole (鬼井幽魂)		
2004	Mean Guy (陰險人物)		
2004	Colour Blossoms (桃色)		
2005	Evil Bewitchment (琴魔)		
2005	The Impotent King (新傾國傾城)		
2006	My Name Is Fame (我要成名)	himself	
2006	Rob-B-Hood (寶貝計劃)	Thong's father	
2008	Ocean Flame (一半海水，一半火焰)		
2009	Kung Fu Chefs (功夫廚神)	2nd Granduncle	
2010	72 Tenants of Prosperity (七十二家房客)	Tin Ngan	
2010	The Haunting Lover (等著你回來)	Mrs. Cui's worker	
2010	Super Player (大玩家)		
2011	I Love Hong Kong (我愛香港)	Newspaper cafe patron	
2012	I Love Hong Kong 2012 (2012我愛HK喜上加囍)		
2013	Sometimes Naive (小學雞大電影)		

=== Television series ===
Year	Network	Title	Role	Notes
1989	TTV	Fate in Tears and Laughter (新啼笑因緣)	Zhao Dezhu	
1993	TVB	Top Cop (超能幹探SuperCop)	Shum Chit	
1993	TTV	The Heaven Sword and Dragon Saber (倚天屠龍記)	Yin Tianzheng	
1993	TTV	Eunuch & Carpenter (大太監與小木匠)	Wang An	
1994	CTS	Justice Pao (包青天)	Guard Wei	Segment 35: "Judgement of Life and Death" (陰陽判)
1995	TVB	The Criminal Investigator II (O記實錄II)	Hung Kwan	
1997	TVB	Drunken Angels (男人四十打功夫)	Fung Pak-chuen	
1998	TVB	Burning Flame (烈火雄心)		
1998	TVB	The Duke of Mount Deer (鹿鼎記)	Hoi Tai-fu	
1999	TVB	Feminine Masculinity (先生貴性)	Tang Kau	
1999	TVB	A Loving Spirit (全院滿座)	Chiu Yat-lung	
2000	TVB	Return of the Cuckoo (十月初五的月光)	Wong Yeung	
2000	TVB	The Legendary Four Aces (金裝四大才子)	Shui Pak	
2000	TVB	Crimson Sabre (碧血劍)	Muk Yan-ching	
2000	TVB	The Heaven Sword and Dragon Saber (倚天屠龍記)	Yan Tin-ching	
2001	TVB	On the Track or Off (勇往直前)	Lam Chan-lin	
2002	TVB	A Herbalist Affair	Tam Kwong-cheong	
2003	TVB	Virtues of Harmony II (皆大歡喜)	Knight Chan	2003-2005
2003	TVB	The 'W' Files (衛斯理)	Cheng Tin-luk	
2003	TVB	Witness to a Prosecution II (洗冤錄II)	Lau Sing	
2003	TVB	Point of No Return (西關大少)		
2004	TVB	Twin of Brothers (大唐雙龍傳)	Yat Sam	
2004	TVB	Life Begins at Forty (花樣中年)	Kwan Sam	
2004	TVB	To Get Unstuck In Time (隔世追兇)		
2005	TVB	Shades of Truth (水滸無間道)	Master Fan	
2006	TVB	Safe Guards (鐵血保鏢)	Chiu Tai-hung	
2006	TVB	Forensic Heroes (法證先鋒)	Ko Tung	
2007	TVB	The Brink of Law (突圍行動)	Ching Fung	
2007	TVB	Treasure Raiders (蕭十一郎)	To Siu-tin	
2007	TVB	The Ultimate Crime Fighter (通天幹探)	Master Wang Hoi	
2008	TVB	Forensic Heroes II (法證先鋒II)	Ko Tung	
2010	TVB	Fire Speed (火速救兵)	Kwan Lai-lap's father	
2011	TVB	ICAC Investigators 2011 (廉政行動2011)	Hung Hon-on's uncle	
