= A Taste of Cold Steel =

1970 Hong Kong film by Yueh Feng

- Film poster
- Directed by: Yueh Feng
- Written by: Wang Po Yi
- Produced by: Run Run Shaw
- Starring: Shu Pei-pei; Chang Yi; Essie Lin Chia; Chan Hung Lit; Wang Hsieh
- Cinematography: Pao Hsueh Li
- Edited by: Chiang Hsing-lung
- Music by: Wang Fu-ling
- Distributed by: Shaw Brothers
- Release date: 16 September 1970 (Hong Kong)
- Running time: 78 minutes
- Country: Hong Kong
- Language: Mandarin

A Taste of Cold Steel (Chinese: 武林風雲; pinyin: Wu lin feng yun) is a 1970 Hong Kong Shaw Brothers' action film adventure directed by Yueh Feng. It is a sequel to Yueh Feng's earlier Shaw Brothers' film, Rape of the Sword.

== Plot ==
The story describes that Prince Wuyi abused his power to seize the Purple Light Sword, even killing Gan Daxiong and forcing Xu Mu to leave. He also ordered his son Lu Tianxia to lead the evil family slaves to break into Gan's fortress, and to seize the sword by force in the name of mourning. When the three daughters of the Gan family, Shengnan, Yanan, and Chaonan, were in panic, Xu Jin, a cousin of the Gan family, came to visit and joined forces to kill the evil slaves. However, Xu Jin, Shengnan and others were injured in the battle, and Yanan, who was unharmed, went to Feihu Ridge to ask for reinforcements. While the Gan family was recovering from their injuries, Lu lured the Five Tigers of Jianghu to attack the Gan family again. Xu Jin and others were outnumbered, and Shengnan was captured. Xu Jin and Chaonan tried their best to protect the Purple Light Sword and escaped at the risk of their lives.

== Cast ==
- Shu Pei-pei
- Chang Yi as Hsu Chin
- Essie Lin Chia as Kan Ah-nan
- Chan Hung Lit as Prince Lu Tien Hsia
- Wang Hsieh as Uncle Hsu
- Ching Yu
- Wen Chen
- Mien Fang as Doctor Kuo
- Simon Hsu as Crippled Tiger
- Chung-Shun Huang as Fierce Tiger
- Liu Hung as Drunken Tiger
- Ku Feng as One-eyed Tiger
- Kun Li as Little Brother
- Yunzhong Li as Prince Wu Yi
- Wu Ma as Sick Tiger
- Pao Chin Yeh as Songstress at Inn
- Sammo Hung Kam-Bo
