= Yueh Feng =

Chinese film director and screenwriter

Griffin Yueh Feng
- Chinese: 岳楓
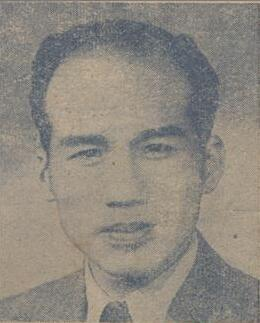
- Yueh Feng in 1943
- Born: Da Zichun; March 20, 1909; Shanghai, China
- Died: July 3, 1999 (aged 90); Hong Kong
- Occupations: Film director, screenwriter
- Years active: 1929-1974

Griffin Yueh Feng (Chinese: 岳枫; pinyin: Yuè Fēng; 1909 or July 29, 1910 – March 3, 1999) was a Chinese film director and screenwriter who worked in the Cinema of Hong Kong. He worked at the Shaw Brothers Studio's for many years and directed nearly 90 films.

== Early life ==
Born as Da Zichun (Chinese: 笪子春) in Shanghai, China, Yueh Feng studied at the Asia Photography School.

== Career ==
Yueh started his career in a film industry as an extra in 1929. By 1933, Yueh advanced to the role of a director after gaining experience as an assistant. In 1949, Yueh became a director for Great Wall Company in Hong Kong, where he directed his first Hong Kong film An Unfaithful Woman (also known as A Forgotten Woman), a 1949 Mandarin drama. Yueh was a director for Cathay Studio, International Films, and Motion Picture & General Investment Co. Ltd. In 1959, he also became a director for Shaw Brothers Studio. Yueh's first Hong Kong film for Shaw Brothers Studio was The Other Woman (also known as Husband's Lover) a Mandarin romantic comedy. That same year, he became a screenwriter for Hong Kong films. Yueh's final film was The Two Cavaliers (also known as Furious Slaughter), a Mandarin martial arts film released in 1973.

== Personal life ==
At age 90, Yueh died in Hong Kong, on July 3, 1999.

== Awards ==
He received numerous nominations throughout his career. He won the Golden Horse Award for the Best Screenplay Bitter Sweet (released in 1963). In the 1990s his films gained much respect, and he was recognized for his lifetime contribution to Hong Kong and Chinese cinema.

- 1999 Lifetime Achievement Award by Film Directors' Guild.

== Filmography ==
=== Films ===
This is a partial list of films.

- 1933 The Raging Tide
- 1938 My Son Is A Woman
- 1940 3 Smiles - Part One
- 1940 3 Smiles - Part Two
- 1947 Three Women
- 1949 An Unfaithful Woman (aka A Forgotten Woman)
- 1949 Blood Will Tell (aka Blood-Stained Begonia)
- 1950 Home Sweet Home
- 1950 The Flower Street
- 1952 The Stormy Night
- 1952 Nonya
- 1952 Modern Red Chamber Dream
- 1953 Rainbow Rhythms
- 1954 Pavilion In The Spring Dawn
- 1956 Merry-Go-Round
- 1956 Green Hills And Jade Valleys
- 1957 The Battle Of Love
- 1957 Golden Lotus
- 1958 A Tales Of Two Wives
- 1958 Scarlet Doll
- 1959 The Wayward Husband
- 1959 Spring Frolic
- 1959 Our Beloved Son
- 1959 The Other Woman
- 1959 For Better, For Worse
- 1960 When The Peach Blossoms Bloom
- 1960 Street Boys
- 1960 The Deformed
- 1961 The Swallow
- 1961 The Husband's Secret
- 1962 Madam White Snake
- 1963 Revenge Of A Swordsman
- 1963 Bitter Sweet
- 1964 The Last Woman Of Shang
- 1964 Lady General Hua Mu-lan
- 1964 Between Tears and Smiles - co-director
- 1965 The West Chamber
- 1965 The Lotus Lamp
- 1967 Rape of the Sword
- 1967 The Dragon Creek
- 1967 Auntie Lan - Director, screenwriter.
- 1968 Spring Blossoms
- 1968 The Magnificent Swordsman
- 1968 The Bells Of Death
- 1969 The Three Smiles
- 1970 The Younger Generation
- 1970 A Taste of Cold Steel
- 1970 The Golden Knight
- 1971 Sons and Daughters
- 1971 The Silent Love
- 1972 Young Avenger
- 1972 Trilogy Of Swordsmanship
- 1972 Martial Hero
- 1973 The Two Cavaliers
- 1973 A Gathering Of Heroes
- 1974 Village Of Tigers
