= Angela Yu Chien =

Hong Kong actress (1942–2000)

- 于倩
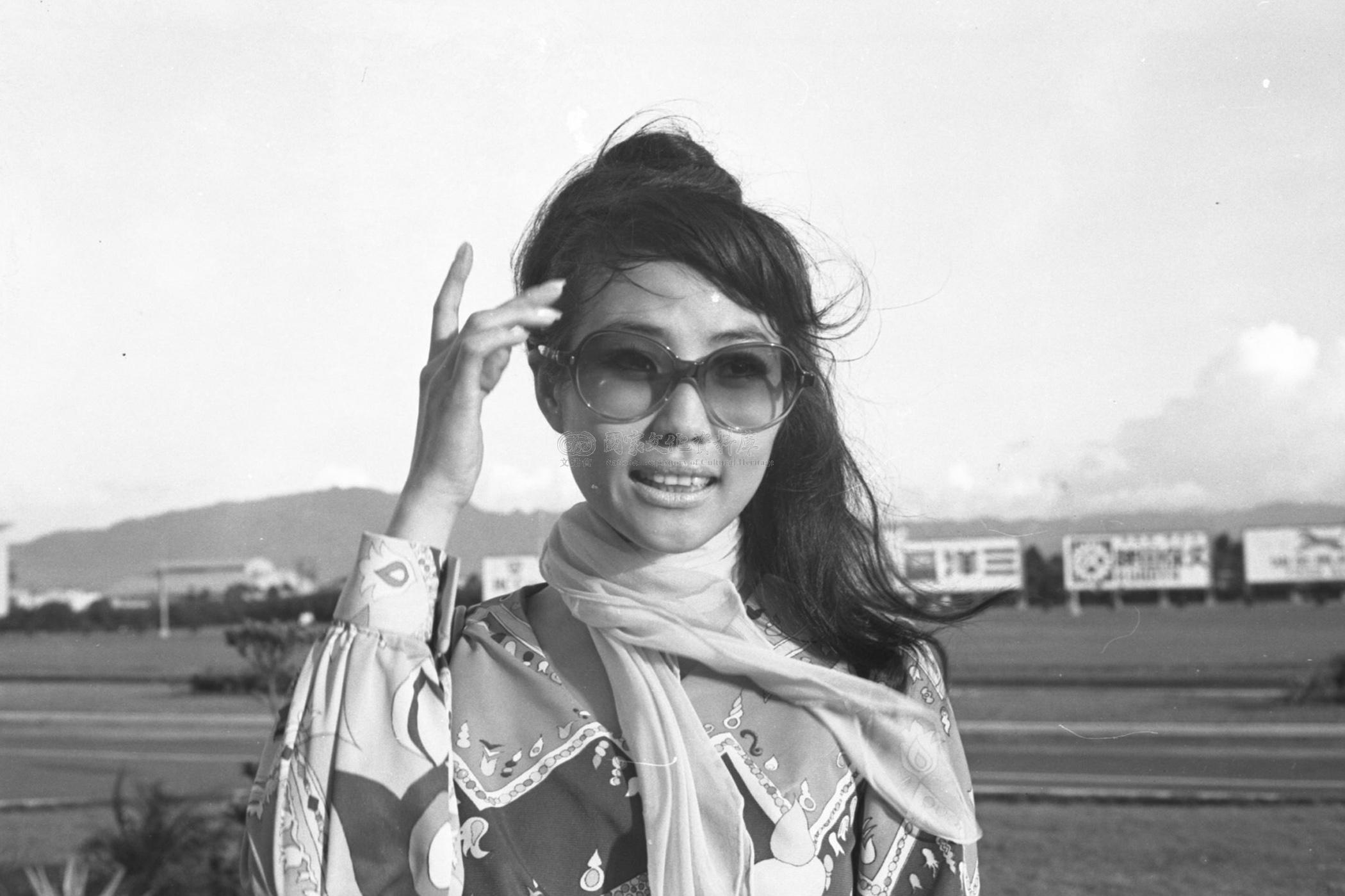
- Yu in 1969
- Born: 11 April 1942; Beijing, China
- Died: 10 April 2000 (aged 57); Queen Mary Hospital, Hong Kong
- Occupation: Actress

Angela Yu Chien (Chinese: 于倩; 1942 – 10 April 2000) was a China-born Hong Kong actress.

== Biography ==
Yu was born in 1942, in Beijing. She moved to Taiwan with her family at age five. In 1960, she moved to Hong Kong and joined the Shaw Brothers Studio's Southern Drama Group as an actress.

She died of cancer in Queen Mary Hospital on April 10, 2000.

== Filmography ==
- 1964 Between Tears and Smiles
- 1964 The Dancing Millionairess - Miss Xia
- 1964 Coffin from Hong Kong as Lee Lai
- 1964 Da ji
- 1964 The Story of Sue San as Maid
- 1965 Xin hua duo duo kai as Julie Yeh Feng
- 1966 Lan yu hei (Shang) as Ji Huiya
- 1966 Lan yu hei (Xia) as Ji Huiya
- 1966 Kuai lo qing chun
- 1967 Da xia fu chou ji
- 1967 Yu hai qing mo as Shangyuan's Mistress
- 1967 Shao nian shi wu er shi shi
- 1967 The Cave of the Silken Web as Third sister
- 1967 Qing chun gu wang as Julie
- 1968 Hong Kong Rhapsody as Li Tan-Ni
- 1968 Duan hun gu Chao Chien Ying
- 1969 Diao jin gui as Liu Wen-ying
- 1969 Dead End as Mary
- 1969 Yiu yan kuang liu as Mona Lin
- 1969 Ren tou ma as Lu-no
- 1970 The Winged Tiger as Yin Cai Hua
- 1971 Chao piao yu wo
- 1975 That's Adultery
- 1975 Hua fei man cheng chun
- 1975 Bruce: Hong Kong Master
- 1975 Xiao Shandong dao Xianggang
- 1976 Killer Elephants
- 1976 Erotic Nights
- 1976 The Oily Maniac
- 1976 The Web of Death
- 1976 The Drug Connection as Margaret
- 1983 Bruce vs. Bill
- 1984 Yi ren zai jian
- 1984 Da xiao bu liang
- 1984 Hong Kong 1941
- 1985 Meng gui po ren
- 1985 Fa gai si doi
- 1987 Tragic Hero as Mrs. Chu
- 1988 The Last Conflict (TV movie) as Kin's mom
- 1989 Life Is Cheap... But Toilet Paper Is Expensive as Blue Velvet
- 1992 Tang xi feng yue hen
