= Fists of Vengeance =

1972 Hong Kong film by Jang Ill Hoe

The Fists of Vengeance
- Directed by: Jang Ill Hoe
- Produced by: Runme Shaw
- Distributed by: Shaw Studios
- Release date: 1972
- Running time: 84 minutes
- Country: Hong Kong
- Language: Mandarin

The Fists of Vengeance is a 1972 Hong Kong film. It was produced under the Shaw Studios banner.

== Cast ==
- Chan Shen
- Chen Yen-yen
- Cheng Li
- Cheng Miu
- Goo Man Chung
- Lily Li Li Li
- Ling Yun
- Dean Shek
- Chan Wai Lau
- Cho Kin
