= The Killer (1972 film) =

1972 Hong Kong film by Chor Yuen

- Theatrical release poster
- Directed by: Chor Yuen
- Screenplay by: Kuo Chia
- Produced by: Run Run Shaw
- Starring: Chin Han; Wang Ping; Tsung Hua; Ku Feng
- Cinematography: Wu Zhuohua
- Edited by: Jiang Xinglong
- Music by: Zhou Fuliang
- Production company: Shaw Brothers Studio
- Distributed by: Warner Bros.
- Release date: 1 August 1972 (Hong Kong)
- Running time: 94 minutes
- Country: Hong Kong
- Language: Mandarin

The Killer (released in the United States as Sacred Knives of Vengeance) is a 1972 Hong Kong martial arts film directed by Chor Yuen.

== Release ==
The film was released in Hong Kong on August 1, 1972.

== Reception ==
From contemporary reviews, Tom Milne of the Monthly Film Bulletin reviewed a dubbed version of the film. Milne found the film to be a "rather tired offering from the Hong Kong conveyor-belt", while noting the film begins well enough with the hero "arriving in town to confound one and all with his dazzling display of town-taming karate chops and kangaroo hops. It also end swell with the las-minute intervention of a genuine Japanese samurai, heralded by a mysterious sound in an apparently empty house as something falls, and one by one the panels of a screen topple over to reveal him in full regalia, ready to challenge the heroes to the only fight in the film staged with any style or imagination." Milne concluded that the film "gets bogged down in endless, drearily identical fights and a plot which labours through its triangular complex of love and friendship."
