= Hong Kong Rhapsody =

1968 Hong Kong film by Umetsugu Inoue

- Directed by: Umetsugu Inoue
- Written by: Umetsugu Inoue
- Produced by: Run Run Shaw
- Starring: Peter Chen Ho; Lee Ching; Allison Chang Yen
- Cinematography: Tadashi Nishimoto
- Edited by: Chiang Hsing-lung
- Music by: Ryōichi Hattori
- Production company: Shaw Brothers Studio
- Release date: 1968
- Running time: 122 minutes
- Country: Hong Kong
- Language: Mandarin

Hong Kong Rhapsody (花月良宵) is a 1968 Hong Kong Shaw Brothers musical film directed by Umetsugu Inoue.

== Cast ==
- Peter Chen Ho as Chen Tzu-Hsin
- Lee Ching as Chang Hsiao-Ping
- Allison Chang Yen as Lin Yu-Lan
- Chan Hung-lit
- Chin Ping
- Lily Ho
- Margaret Hsing Hui
- Jing Ting (singing voice)
- Helen Ma
- Ma Xiaonong as Liu Ma
- Peng Peng
- Wei Ping-Ao as Wei Chung-Liang
- Yang Chih-Ching as Lin Chin-Fu
- Angela Yu Chien as Li Tan-Ni

== See also ==
- Hong Kong Nocturne (1967)
