= A Place to Call Home (1970 film) =

1970 Hong Kong film by Wu Jiaxiang

- Directed by: Wu Jiaxiang
- Written by: I. Fang Yeh
- Produced by: Runme Shaw
- Starring: Li Ching (actress)
- Cinematography: Ming Huang
- Edited by: Hsing-lung Chiang
- Music by: Fu-ling Wang
- Distributed by: Shaw Brothers
- Release date: 11 April 1970
- Running time: 89 minutes
- Country: Hong Kong
- Language: Mandarin

A Place to Call Home or Yu nu qin qing is a 1970 Hong Kong Shaw Brothers drama film directed by Wu Jiaxiang.

== Cast ==
- Li Ching (actress)
- Margaret Hsing Hui - Irene Jang.
- Yi Ling Chen
- Barry Chan
- Yu Fang
- Kao Pao-shu
- Hsiao Chung Li
- Ying Ma
- Ouyang Sha-fei
- Lao Shen
- Feng Sun
- Jing Tang
- Chu Lin Tsang
- Chih-Ching Yang
- Chun Yen

== Plot ==
A girl from a well-to-do and loving family discovers she is adopted and goes in search of her biological mother. All is not well after she finds her real mother and moves in with her. Her stepfather tries to rape her but she escapes with the help of her adopted father and boyfriend. After the trials and tribulations, she realises that her home is where true parental love is.
