= The Winged Tiger =

1970 Hong Kong film by San Kong

- DVD cover
- 插翅虎
- Directed by: San Kong
- Written by: San Kong
- Produced by: Run Run Shaw
- Starring: Chan Hung-lit; Angela Yu; Tien Feng; Annette Sam; David Chiang; Paul Wei
- Cinematography: Hua Shan
- Edited by: Chiang Hsing-lung
- Music by: Wang Fu-ling
- Production company: Shaw Brothers Studio
- Distributed by: Shaw Brothers Studio
- Release date: 18 February 1970
- Running time: 93 minutes
- Country: Hong Kong
- Language: Mandarin
- Box office: HK$552,565

The Winged Tiger (插翅虎) is a 1970 Hong Kong wuxia film produced by the Shaw Brothers Studio and directed by San Kong, starring Chan Hung-lit, who is known for portraying villains, in his first lead role as a hero. The film also co-starred Angela Yu, Tien Feng and David Chiang. Lau Kar-leung served as the action director for the film.

== Synopsis ==
Yin Delong and "Winged Tiger" Deng Fei are two notorious villains in the jianghu who have each inherited half of a martial arts manual left behind by a deceased master. Plotting to seize Deng's half, Yin arranges for his sister Saihua to marry Deng. The leaders of the orthodox clans in the jianghu send Guo Jiuru to impersonate Deng and steal the manual to prevent it from falling into the wrong hands.

On his way to the Yin residence, Guo encounters Deng, kills him, and takes Deng's half of the manual. He also meets Liu Haoran and his daughter Liu Yanqing, who carry a message from the orthodox clans ordering Guo to destroy the manual once he gets both halves. Guo, however, refuses as he believes that the skills in the manual can be used for good purposes.

When Guo meets Yin, he hands over Deng's half of the manual (with a few missing pages) and learns that Yin's henchmen are also secretly plotting to betray their master and get the manual. They also suspect his identity after finding Deng's body, but he temporarily allays their suspicions by using Deng's signature move. Meanwhile, Saihua gets romantically attracted to Guo, but eventually learns that he is not really Deng.

In the end, Guo mortally injures Saihua by accident while fending off Yin's henchmen. Guo then fights with Yin, who uses his whip to wrap around Guo's neck to strangle him, but Saihua helps to free Guo, giving Guo the chance to kill Yin. Saihua dies from her wound and Guo carries her dead body to Mount Hua.

== Cast ==
- Chan Hung-lit as Guo Jiuru
- Angela Yu as Yin Saihua
- Tien Feng as Yin Delong
- Cheng Lui as Deng Fei
- David Chiang as Bai Yunsheng
- Fang Mian as Liu Haoran
- Cheng Miu as the Mount Hua Sect leader
- Paul Wei as Youming
- Annette Sam as Liu Yanqing
- Luo Han as Zhao Bi
- Tong Tin-hei as Liu Kun
- Yeung Chak-lam as Zhang Piao

== Box office ==
The film grossed HK$552,565.60 at the Hong Kong box office during its theatrical run from 18 to 27 February 1970.
