= The Anonymous Heroes =

1971 Hong Kong film by Chang Cheh

- Theatrical release poster
- Directed by: Chang Cheh
- Screenplay by: Ni Kuang
- Produced by: Run Run Shaw
- Starring: David Chiang; Ti Lung; Ching Li
- Cinematography: Kung Mu-To
- Edited by: Kwok Ting-Hung
- Music by: Frankie Chan
- Distributed by: Shaw Brothers
- Release date: 24 July 1971 (Hong Kong)
- Running time: 103 minutes
- Country: Hong Kong
- Language: Mandarin

The Anonymous Heroes (Traditional Chinese:無名英雄 or Simplified Chinese:无名英雄, romanization: Wu Ming Ying Xiong) is a 1971 Hong Kong Shaw Brothers action-comedy film directed by Chang Cheh. Set during the 1920s warlord era of China, it tells the story of two vagabond brother in arms and a lady in a struggle against a warlord.

== Plot ==
After the fall of the Qing dynasty, China become a republic but later embroiled in civil unrest and warlordism. General Jin, was a warlord ruling an unnamed northern province overseeing a large shipment of weapons of new 3,000 rifles for the general's 3rd Division, arriving in his territory.

Seeking to steal the newly arrived weapon for the Nationalist use, Wan Tai, a National Revolutionary Army (Note: In the film it was simply referred to as the Revolutionary Army (Simplified Chinese: 革命军).) soldier from the south infiltrate the warlord's territory, encountered a local vagabond Meng Gang. Meng Gang brought Wan to his hideout. Wan wanted to recruit Meng Gang to steal thousands of recently acquired rifles from the warlord. Meng initially reluctant due to the risk of execution, agree to join Wan's heist. Meng's brother-in-arm Tie Hu also joined Wan's plan. They were also joined by Hong Yingfen, a daughter of a local anti-smuggling officer and also a friend of them, after she (who eavesdropped on the conversation) threatened to exposed their plan unless she was also involved in the heist and paid despite the two men joined the heist out of sympathies for the Nationalist cause.

While Hong asking her dad, an anti-smuggling officer for trucks, the three men meanwhile began their operation by stealing uniform of the warlord's officer, holding one of the high-ranking officer hostage to fool the arsenal director and drives to the arsenal to transfer the weapon. However the arsenal director Wang refused to transfer the 3,000 rifle without written document of permission from General Jin himself. The two vagabond managed to intercept a car carrying one of General Jin's officer with the required document and knocking the passenger out. However, there is no required document inside the suitcase (the permission document was actually inside the knocked out General Jin's officer uniform) and the heist almost failed until General Jin directly called arsenal director Wang to transfer the weaponry. The arsenal director, believing the disguised officer and the hostage high ranking subordinate as General Jin's own men being send to secure the weapon, approved the transfer and they transport the weaponry inside the truck that Hong managed to secure. They later unload the weaponry inside a train carriage.

Their plan was later discovered and Hong's father were arrested and some other subordinate officers were executed by firing squad. General Jin's cavalry forces were send to intercept them. The hostage officer were killed and Wan Tai is mortally wounded from gunfire. Wan Tai dies before he could tell the name of his comrade who also serve in the nationalist army. The trio managed to separate the carriage carrying weaponry from the locomotive and escape before the train derails and crashed into a river while the carriage crashed into the woods. The trio briefly mourn the killed train conductor before hiding the carriage. Tie Hu damaged the railway tracks to fool General Jin's forces.

General Jin meanwhile arrest the 4th Division commander, Zijun and disarmed the division, suspecting them to be the responsible for the heist due the train wreck was in the territory under 4th Division jurisdiction. The trio wanders into a town and almost caught by some off duty General Jin's soldiers in a gambling den/restaurant fight due to Hong being known as the daughter of an officer. The trio encountered a local bandit leader, Yan Wang, pretending to be Wan Tai's comrade, who brought the trio into his hideout. The bandit leader soon reveal himself and have threatening them at gunpoint to reveal the weapon location for his own group usage. It was soon later escalated into a fight and the trio barely escaped the fight between them and Yan Wang's bandit group just when General Jin's men arrived in time to investigate the gunfire and killed all the bandits and Yan Wang himself. Meng was later caught and brought into General Jin. Meng challenged the general into a gamble in which he would be freed if he won. The general pretended to lose the game and set him free in order to track his friend and catch them alive to interrogates them of the weapon location. The trio reunited and discovered the real Wan Tai's friend, who reveal his name as Chen Sheng, disguised as a street food seller after showing his picture with Wan Tai, although initially not believing Chen Sheng due to previous incident.

After telling Chen of the location of hidden weaponry, the trio ran away after General Jin's force are pursuing them. Chen Sheng later unload the weaponry the trio told him and later distribute the rifles to militia to arm a local rebellion against the warlord seeking the advantage of the disarmed 4th Division in their territory. Chen remarks that they would never get to known the trio's names. (Note: Hence the film eponymous "The Anonymous Heroes", from Chen Sheng's perspective of the trio being anonymous to him.)

In the final fight, after suffering heavy losses, pursuing General Jin's soldiers led by battalion captain Cheng are forced to open fire upon the trio despite the order to catch them alive, slightly injuring Meng Gang. General Jin arrived to offer them amnesty in exchange to reveal the weapon location. They refused, Tie Hu was fatally stabbed by bayonet in a close quarter fights and Meng attempted to throw a bayonet into the general, however the general survive and Meng was mortally wounded by gunfire in the process. Hong retaliated with gunfire, killing few before herself were getting shot by the soldiers. The trio later hold their hand together before dying and the general later drive away from the scene, disappointed.

In the last scene, Chen Sheng led his militia charging down the hill, and montage of the trio together.

== Cast ==
- David Chiang as Meng Gang
- Ti Lung as Tie Hu (Steel Tiger)
- Ching Li as Hong Yinfeng
- Ku Feng as Wan Tai
- Ching Miao as General Jin
- Yang Chih Ching as the arsenal director Wang
- Wang Chung as battalion captain Cheng
- Zheng Lei as Chen Sheng

== See also ==
- Warlord Era
