= Have Sword, Will Travel =

1969 Hong Kong film by Chang Cheh

- Film poster
- 保鏢
- Directed by: Chang Cheh
- Screenplay by: Ni Kuang
- Produced by: Runme Shaw
- Starring: Ti Lung; David Chiang; Lee Ching
- Cinematography: Kung Mu-to
- Edited by: Chiang Hsing-lung
- Music by: Wang Fu-ling
- Production company: Shaw Brothers Studio
- Distributed by: Shaw Brothers Studio
- Release date: 25 December 1969
- Running time: 101 minutes
- Country: Hong Kong
- Language: Mandarin
- Box office: HK$1,031,768

Have Sword, Will Travel (保鏢) is a 1969 Hong Kong wuxia film directed by Chang Cheh, starring Ti Lung, David Chiang and Lee Ching.

== Synopsis ==
Yin Kefeng, the leader of a martial arts clan in Luoyang, has been helping the local government escort a tribute of silver to the imperial capital Kaifeng every year. However, this year, he seems to have lost his fighting prowess due to an illness. When the notorious Flying Tigers Gang learn about this, they decide to rob the convoy.

Yin Kefeng secretly seeks help from an old friend, who sends her apprentice Xiang Ding and his fiancée Yun Piaopiao to guard the convoy. Along the way, they encounter a highly-skilled swordsman Luo Yi, whom Yun Piaopiao fancies. Xiang Ding, feeling jealous, suspects that Luo Yi is with the Flying Tigers. It turns out that the gang has indeed attempted to recruit Luo Yi, who had turned down their offer.

Xiang Ding, Yun Piaopiao and Luo Yi eventually work together to defeat the gang and complete their mission, but Luo Yi dies of his wounds.

== Cast ==
- Ti Lung as Xiang Ding
- David Chiang as Luo Yi
- Lee Ching as Yun Piaopiao
- Ku Feng as Jiao Hong
- Cheng Miu as Yin Kefeng

== Box office ==
The film grossed HK$1,031,768 at the Hong Kong box office during its theatrical run from 25 December 1969 to 8 January 1970.
