= The Jade Faced Assassin =

1971 Hong Kong film by Yan Jun

- DVD cover art
- 玉面俠
- Directed by: Yan Jun
- Written by: Wong Fung
- Based on: Juedai Shuangjiao by Gu Long
- Produced by: Run Run Shaw
- Starring: Lily Ho; Kao Yuen
- Cinematography: Wong Kim-hon
- Edited by: Chiang Hsing-lung
- Music by: Frankie Chan
- Production company: Shaw Brothers Studio
- Release date: 9 April 1971
- Running time: 105 minutes
- Country: Hong Kong
- Language: Mandarin

The Jade Faced Assassin (玉面俠) is a 1971 Hong Kong wuxia film adapted from Gu Long's novel Juedai Shuangjiao. Produced by the Shaw Brothers Studio, it was directed by Yan Jun and starred Lily Ho and Kao Yuen.

== Synopsis ==
The swordsman Zhang Zhen is injured in a misadventure and rescued by the Eldest Sister of Changchun Sect, who has a crush on him. However, Zhang falls in love with the maid Yuenu instead, and conceives twins with her. The couple are killed by a group of evil martial artists later. The Eldest Sister is angry with Zhang Zhen for not accepting her and plans to make Zhang's children kill each other as revenge. The baby girl (Xiaolu'er) is saved by Zhang's friend, Lian Lanyan, while the male infant (Hua Yuchun) is taken away by the Eldest Sister. Lian Lanyan encounters the Ten Villains, who overwhelm him and knock him out. The baby Xiaolu'er is taken away by the Villains, who surprisingly do not harm her, and instead intend to groom her to become the greatest villain ever. Eighteen years later, the twins meet each other by coincidence.

== Cast ==
- Lily Ho as Xiaolu'er
- Kao Yuen as Hua Yuchun
- Ku Feng as Lian Lanyan
- Fan Mei-sheng as Yuchi Zhouguang
- Cheung Poi-san as Zhang Zhen
- Angela Pan as Xie Xinchan
- Irene Chen as Yuenu
- Essie Lin Chia as Eldest Sister
- Chai No as Black Face
- Yan Jun as Lan Cunxiu
- Law Hon as Smiling Sword Master
- Hoh Ban as Master Chin
- Shum Lo as Heaven Full of Stars Master
