= Secret Service of the Imperial Court =

1984 Hong Kong film by Tony Lo

- Film poster
- 錦衣衛
- Directed by: Tony Lo
- Written by: Tony Lo; Cheung Kwok-yuen
- Produced by: Mona Fong
- Starring: Bryan Leung; Nancy Hu; Tony Liu; Ku Feng; Lo Mang; Lo Lieh
- Cinematography: Ma Gam-cheung
- Edited by: Lau Shiu-gwong; Henry Cheung; Chan Gan-shing
- Music by: So Jan-hau; Stephen Shing
- Production company: Shaw Brothers Studio
- Distributed by: Shaw Brothers Studio
- Release date: 19 October 1984
- Running time: 88 minutes
- Country: Hong Kong
- Language: Mandarin
- Box office: HK$1,376,722

Secret Service of the Imperial Court (錦衣衛), also known as Police Pool of Blood, is a 1984 Hong Kong wuxia film produced by the Shaw Brothers Studio and directed by Tony Lo, starring Bryan Leung and Tony Liu. Set in 15th-century China, the film follows a jinyiwei (secret police) officer who becomes disillusioned with his purpose under the direction of a corrupt court eunuch based on the historical figure Wang Zhen.

The 2010 film 14 Blades has been suggested to be a remake.

== Synopsis ==
In 15th-century China, the eunuch Wang Zhen holds sway over the Emperor and has amassed much political power, controlling the jinyiwei (secret police) and using it to eliminate those who oppose him. Wang orders Zhao Wuyi, the jinyiwei chief, to execute three generals who have committed treason. Zhao, in turn, sends his son Zhao Bufan, a jinyiwei officer, to carry out the task.

After killing one general, Bufan realises that his targets are actually loyal men framed for treason after standing up to Wang. He spares the other two and lies that he has completed his mission. Later, the two generals attempt to assassinate Wang but fail and die. Wang realises he has been deceived and orders Zhao Wuyi to bring him Bufan's head, or else the entire Zhao family will face execution.

Forced to go on the run with his wife Xueniang and their son, Bufan takes shelter with his relatives. Unknown to him, his uncle Zhao Wuji has secretly been ordered by Zhao Wuyi to kill him. When Zhao Wuji and his daughter Xiaolan attack Bufan, Bufan is forced to kill them in self-defence but gets severely wounded. He is saved by his younger brother Buqun, who has apparently been executed for defying the jinyiwei code, which includes turning on one's family if one is forced to choose between family and emperor.

While Bufan is recovering, Buqun disguises himself as Bufan to draw out the jinyiwei hunting down his brother, fighting them and dying in his brother's place. Xueniang witnesses Buqun's sacrifice and commits suicide in guilt. Meanwhile, Buqun's head is taken back to Zhao Wuyi, who is overwhelmed with guilt upon recognising his younger son. Zhao Wuyi decides to stop taking orders from Wang, and tricks Wang into granting him an audience. Bufan shows up and forces Wang to face him in a duel. After defeating and slaying the eunuch to avenge his brother, Bufan leaves to lead a peaceful life with his son.

== Cast ==
- Bryan Leung as Zhao Bufan
- Nancy Hu as Xueniang
- Tony Liu as Wang Zhen
- Ku Feng as Zhao Wuyi
- Lo Mang as Zhao Buqun
- Lo Lieh as Zhao Wuji
- Liu Yu-pu as Zhao Xiaolan
- Ko Fei as Cao Jixiang
- Ku Kuan-chung as Lin Jun
- Lung Tien-hsiang as Zhang Qiang
- Sun Chien as Li Yi
- Cheung Lik as Wang Biao
- Jason Pai Piao as Yu Hualong
- Lau Siu-gwan as the Emperor
- Ching Miu as Li Yan
- Wang Ching-ho as Official Wang

== Reception ==
In a review for Hong Kong Cinemagic, David-Olivier Vidouze described Secret Service of the Imperial Court as one of the last great achievements to be produced by the Shaw Brothers Studio, with its greatest quality being the emotional power generated through the complex scenarios faced by the characters. These included the multi-faceted ideas of duty: the duty of a son to his father, the duty of an officer of the law to political superiors, and the duty of a clan leader to his community, all the while forcing the main and supporting characters into moral dilemmas and making difficult decisions. However, the film's action scenes received some criticism for being too fast-paced.

The film was similarly noted by Tatu Piispanen in a 2003 review as being one of the best of the new wave wuxia films from the 1980s, and was praised for its directorial innovation, sets, action choreography, and music.

In addition, the arduous and violent journey of Bufan pursuing vengeance with his infant son has been seen as paralleling that of Ogami Ittō and Daigorō from the Japanese manga Lone Wolf and Cub. Tony Lo was said to have been inspired by Japanese cinema and incorporated elements of it into the film including a duel with Bufan as well as the use of extreme gore and violence in several of the sword-fighting scenes.

Bryan Leung and Tony Liu received praise for their performances, with Leung being lauded for his outstanding action and drama scenes, while Liu's portrayal of Wang Zhen was described as bringing to life "one of the most sadistically flamboyant villain roles in action film history." Supporting actor Ku Feng was also noted for his convincing performance as a tortured father.

== Box office ==
The film underperformed during its theatrical run at the Hong Kong box office, grossing HK$1,376,722 between 19 October to 23 October 1984. Its poor financial performance reflected the Shaw Brothers Studio's continued struggle to draw in crowds against rival companies Golden Harvest and Seasonal Films.
