= Dead End (1969 film) =

1969 Hong Kong film by Chang Cheh

- Film poster

Chinese name
- Traditional Chinese: 死角
- Simplified Chinese: 死角
Transcriptions
Standard Mandarin
- Hanyu Pinyin: Sǐ Jiǎo
Yue: Cantonese
- Jyutping: Sei2 Gok3
- Directed by: Chang Cheh
- Screenplay by: Yau-tai On-ping
- Produced by: Runme Shaw
- Starring: Ti Lung; Lee Ching; David Chiang; Chan Hung-lit; Angela Yu Chien
- Cinematography: Kung Mu-to
- Edited by: Chiang Hsing-lung
- Music by: Wang Fu-ling
- Production company: Shaw Brothers Studio
- Distributed by: Shaw Brothers Studio
- Release date: 12 July 1969 (Hong Kong)
- Running time: 100 minutes
- Country: Hong Kong
- Language: Mandarin
- Box office: HK$519,097

Dead End is a 1969 Hong Kong action drama film directed by Chang Cheh and starring Ti Lung, Lee Ching, David Chiang, Chan Hung-lit, and Angela Yu Chien. Dead End marks the first film that Chang directed set in modern day, Ti's first leading role, and the first collaboration of director Chang with stars Ti and Chiang, dubbed "The Iron Triangle," because of their successful line of films together which would last several years.

== Plot ==
Uninhibited youth Zhang Chun (Ti Lung) and his friends David (David Chiang) and Mary (Angela Yu Chien), while cruising on their car, meets rich heiress Wen Rou (Lee Ching). Chun and Rou fall in love at first sight and begin dating. One day, Chun and Rou witnesses a cop chasing an escaped prisoner while on their way home and Chun also picks up a pistol left behind by the prisoner.

Rou's older brother Qiang (Chan Hung-lit) dislikes Chun and always pressures him, but Chun and Rou do not care about Qiang's objection and continue dating. One day, Rou dresses up as a man for fun and goes to a café with Chun. However, a café waitress sees through the disguise. Chun got into a fight in the café and was arrested by the police. Qiang becomes furious after hearing this and sends his thugs to beat up Chun and also forbidding his sister to see Chun. Chun was unwilling to let go of Rou and afterwards, he travels to Rou's house with David. There, they were beaten up by Qiang and his thugs and David dies from his injuries.

At this point, Chun was no longer willing to tolerate and takes his pistol he found earlier and kills Qiang. Although Chun was able to escape from the crime scene, but he was followed by the police when he goes to meet Rou again. In the midst of a chaos, Chun dies in the polices' gunfire.

== Cast ==
- Ti Lung as Zhang Chun
- Lee Ching as Wen Rou
- David Chiang as David Liao Ching-shui
- Chan Hung-lit as Wen Qiang
- Angela Yu Chien as Mary
- Chen Yen-yen as Zhang Chun's mother
- Koo Man-chung as Rich man lawn bowling
- Fang Mian as JS Lee
- Guo Hui-jian as Hsiao Niu
- Ching Miao as Jia Kai-ming
- Poon Oi-lun as Pai Li, Ming's secretary
- Yip Bo-kam as Zhang Chun's girl
- Wang Dan as landlady
- Wong Ching-wan as Wang Ping
- Lee Sau-kei as Police inspector
- Wang Kuang-yu as police officer
- Chan Sing as Escaped prisoner
- Wu Ma as Office clerk
- Hoh Wan as Office clerk
- Yee Kwan as cop
- Lan Wei-lieh as cop
- To Wing-leung as cop
- Lau Kar-wing as Wen Qiang's thug/friend
- Wong Ching as Wen Qiang's thug/friend
- Chan Chuen as Wen Qiang's thug/friend
- Wong Pau-kei as Wen Qiang's thug/friend
- Yuen Woo-ping as Wen Qiang's thug/friend
- Yuen Cheung-yan as Wen Qiang's thug/friend
- Wong Chung as Wen Qiang's thug/friend
- Hsu Hsia as Wen Qiang's thug/friend
- Liu Wai as David's garage boss
- Wilson Tong as Job interviewee
- Chieh Yuan as man at swimming pool
- Man Lei as Tailor
- Chu Kam as Mary's club customer
- Ng Yuen-fan as bar bouncer
- Chan Seng-tong as policeman
- King Pai-chien as passerby

== Box office ==
The film grossed HK$519,097 at the Hong Kong box office during its theatrical run from 12 to 18 July 1969 in Hong Kong.
