= Hong Kong Nocturne =

1967 Hong Kong film by Umetsugu Inoue

- Directed by: Umetsugu Inoue
- Written by: Umetsugu Inoue
- Produced by: Run Run Shaw
- Cinematography: Tadashi Nishimoto
- Edited by: Chiang Hsing-lung
- Music by: Ryōichi Hattori
- Production company: Shaw Brothers Studio
- Release date: 1967
- Running time: 128 minutes
- Country: Hong Kong
- Language: Mandarin

Hong Kong Nocturne (香江花月夜) is a 1967 Hong Kong Shaw Brothers musical film directed by Umetsugu Inoue.

== Plot ==
The Chia sisters (Cheng Pei-pei, Lily Ho and Chin Ping) perform as the backup troupe with their magician father (Chiang Kuang-Chao). The selfish old man has little regard for his daughters and squanders their hard earned money on a young floozy who plays him for a fool. After winning a go-go dance contest, the girls ditch their father and pursue their dreams.

== Cast ==
- Paul Chang Chung
- Chan Hei
- Chao Hsin Yen
- Cheng Kang-Yeh - Wang Ying
- Cheng Pei-pei - Chia Chuen-Chuen
- Chiang Kuang Chao - Chia Szu-Chen
- Chin Ping - Chia Ting-Ting
- Tina Fei Chin - Hsiao Hua
- Fan Dan - Promoter
- Lily Ho - Chia Tsui-Tsui
- Peter Chen Ho - Chen Tze-Ching
- Ku Feng - Janitor at ballet school
- Li Hao
- Ling Yun - Fang Yun-Tai
- Li Yunzhong - Japanese film director (as Yun-Chung Li)
- Lui Ming
- Ouyang Sha-fei - Chen Tze-Ching's mother
- Tien Feng - Yen Fang
- Tien Shun - Mr. Chen
- Wu Chun-li
- Wu Wei
- Yueh Hua

== See also ==
- Hong Kong Rhapsody (1968)
