= King Eagle =

1971 Hong Kong film by Chang Cheh

- Film poster
- 鷹王
- Directed by: Chang Cheh
- Written by: Ni Kuang
- Produced by: Run Run Shaw
- Starring: Ti Lung; Lee Ching
- Cinematography: Kung Mu-to
- Edited by: Chiang Hsing-lung
- Music by: Wang Fu-ling
- Production company: Shaw Brothers Studio
- Distributed by: Shaw Brothers Studio
- Release date: 1 January 1971
- Running time: 80 minutes
- Country: Hong Kong
- Language: Mandarin

King Eagle (鷹王) is a 1971 Hong Kong wuxia film directed by Chang Cheh and produced by the Shaw Brothers Studio, starring Ti Lung and Lee Ching.

== Synopsis ==
Zhan Fei, a famous martial artist nicknamed "King Eagle", encounters the mortally wounded sixth chief of the martial arts clan Tianyitang, and hears that the master of Tianyitang has been murdered by Hong Qingtian, the clan's first chief. Although he is unwilling to get involved in power struggles in the jianghu, Zhan Fei still finds himself under attack by Hong Qingtian and his henchwoman Yan Bing'er.

By coincidence, Zhan Fei meets Yan Yulian, Yan Bing'er's twin sister and the seventh chief of Tianyitang, and befriends her. Together, they go to Tianyitang to confront the villains and start a fight which ends with the deaths of Hong Qingtian and the Yan sisters. A deeply saddened Zhan Fei leaves and continues roaming the jianghu alone.

== Cast ==
- Ti Lung as Zhan Fei
- Lee Ching as Yan Bing'er / Yan Yulian
- Cheng Miu as Wen Haoba
- Chang Pei-shan as Hong Qingtian
- Wang Chung as Chief Fan
- Wang Kuang-yu as Fang Sheng
- Cheng Lui as Chief Guan
- Chan Sing as Chen Tang
- Liu Gang as Fourth Chief
- Chan Chuen and Tang Chia as the Twin Evils of Taishan
- Tung Li and Hung Liu as the Twin Killers of Luxi
- Yau Lung as Zhu Hong
- Lee Sau-kei as Tianyitang Master
