= Flower in the Rain =

1972 Hong Kong film by Kim Soo-Yong

- Directed by: Kim Soo-Yong
- Release date: 1972
- Country: Hong Kong
- Language: Mandarin

Flower in the Rain is a 1972 Hong Kong romantic drama film directed by Kim Soo-Yong.

== Plot ==
A rich girl and her boyfriend run off to Singapore after her father objects to their relationship. Her boyfriend is injured and they run short of money. Unable to find a job, she works in a nightclub and becomes one of the most sought after girls. Her boss rapes her when she decides to quit. Her boyfriend finds out and a fight ensues, in which the boss is killed. In grief, she kills herself by falling off a cliff.

== Cast ==
- Lily Ho Li Li
- Ling Yun
- James Nam
- Tsang Choh
- Chen Yen-yen
- Goo Man Chung
- Lam Fung
- Chu Gam
- Hsu Yu
- Lui Hung
