= Rape of the Sword =

1967 Hong Kong film by Yueh Feng

- Film poster
- 盜劍
- Directed by: Yueh Feng
- Written by: Wong Baak-yat
- Based on: Crouching Tiger, Hidden Dragon by Wang Dulu
- Produced by: Runme Shaw
- Starring: Li Li-hua; Lee Ching; Chan Hung-lit; Kiu Chong; Tien Feng
- Cinematography: Pao Hsueh-li
- Edited by: Chiang Hsing-lung
- Music by: Wang Fu-ling; Zhou Lan-ping
- Production company: Shaw Brothers Studio
- Distributed by: Shaw Brothers Studio
- Release date: 8 November 1967
- Running time: 78 minutes
- Country: Hong Kong
- Language: Mandarin

Rape of the Sword (盜劍) is a 1967 Hong Kong wuxia film directed by Yueh Feng and produced by the Shaw Brothers Studio, starring Li Li-hua, Lee Ching, Chan Hung-lit, Kiu Chong and Tien Feng. The film is believed by many, including action choreographer Yuen Woo-ping, to be a loose adaptation of the novel Crouching Tiger, Hidden Dragon by Wang Dulu even though the film does not explicitly state so. When the film was released in 1967 during the Cultural Revolution, it was impossible for the Hong Kong-based Shaw Brothers Studio to get into contact with Wang Dulu, who was in mainland China, to acquire the rights to adapt the novel into a film, hence Wang was not credited.

== Synopsis ==
Han Jiuchong lures and kills his junior Tan Heming to obtain their deceased master's sword and presents it to Prince Wuyi. Tan's wife, Geng Liuniang, survives and disguises herself as a servant in the household of the general Zhong Qi while waiting for a chance to avenge her husband.

When the prince tries to force an arranged marriage between Jiaolong and his godson Lu Tianxia, Geng is forced to reveal her true identity when she steps in to stop the marriage. While fighting with Han, Geng is seriously wounded but saved by Jiaolong, whom she takes as her apprentice and teaches her martial arts.

After completing her training, Jiaolong goes to Mount Jiuhua, where she befriends a bandit chief Luo Yihu, who turns out to be the apprentice of Geng's senior. Jiaolong and Luo fall in love. Upon learning of the sword's origin, Luo decides to break into the prince's residence to steal the sword but gets overwhelmed and captured by the prince's men.

Just then, the prince realises that the real sword has been stolen and replaced with a fake one. In anger, the prince prepares to execute Luo while setting a trap for his accomplices. Geng, Jiaolong and the Mount Jiuhua bandits come to save Luo and fight with Han and the prince's men.

It turns out the real sword has been taken by the nobleman Liu Zhonghao, who passes it to Geng. Geng then uses the sword to fight Han and eventually kills him, avenging her husband.

== Cast ==
- Li Li-hua as Geng Liuniang
- Lee Ching as Zhong Jiaolong
- Chan Hung-lit as Lu Tianxia
- Kiu Chong as Luo Yihu
- Tien Feng as Zhong Qi
- Tang Ti as Han Jiuchong
- Lee Wan-chung as Prince Wuyi
- Yeung Chi-hing as Liu Zhonghao
