= The New One-Armed Swordsman =

1971 Hong Kong film by Chang Cheh

- Film poster
- 新獨臂刀
- Directed by: Chang Cheh
- Written by: Ni Kuang
- Produced by: Run Run Shaw
- Starring: David Chiang; Ti Lung; Lee Ching
- Cinematography: Kung Mu-to
- Edited by: Guo Tinghong
- Music by: Chen Yung-huang
- Production company: Shaw Brothers Studio
- Release date: 7 February 1971
- Running time: 102 minutes
- Country: Hong Kong
- Language: Mandarin
- Box office: HK$1.6 million (Hong Kong); 564,061 tickets (France)

The New One-Armed Swordsman (新獨臂刀) is a 1971 Hong Kong wuxia film directed by Chang Cheh and produced by the Shaw Brothers Studio, starring David Chiang. Chiang replaced Jimmy Wang, the star of the two preceding films in the series, The One-Armed Swordsman and Return of the One-Armed Swordsman.

== Synopsis ==
Lei Li is a highly-skilled swordsman and rising star in the wulin. Long Yizhi, the leader of the martial arts clan Tiger Mansion, feels jealous so he plots Lei's downfall by sending his men to commit robbery and push the blame to Lei. Using his status in the wulin to cover up the crime and pretending to mediate the conflict between Lei and the victim, Long uses a three-section staff to defeat Lei. Disgraced, Lei cuts off his right arm and retires from the wulin.

Lei takes up a new job as a waiter in an eatery, where he is often mocked for his disability. Only Bajiao, the local blacksmith's daughter, respects and treats him kindly, encouraging him to return to the wulin. One day, two thugs visit the eatery and molest Bajiao, forcing Lei to use his skills to save her. Around the same time, another swordsman Feng Junjie who is passing by steps in and helps Lei drive away the thugs. After they introduce themselves to each other, they become sworn brothers. Lei gradually regains confidence in himself.

Meanwhile, the thugs report the incident to their master, who plots with Long to lure Feng into a trap by pretending to invite him to a wulin gathering at Tiger Mansion. Despite Lei's warning, Feng still shows up and fights with Long, who defeats him with his three-section staff. A defeated Feng is tied up and executed by Chen Zhennan, who slices him into half at the waist.

Upon hearing of his sworn brother's death, Lei takes the sword Bajiao gave him and fights his way into Tiger Mansion. He uses a single-armed, fast technique that he has been secretly practising for over a year to kill all the enemies in his way before confronting Long on a bridge. He counters Long's three-section staff with a special technique and cuts off Long's arm before throwing him off the bridge. Having taken his revenge, he returns and spends the rest of his life with Bajiao.

== Cast ==
- David Chiang as Lei Li
- Ti Lung as Feng Junjie
- Lee Ching as Bajiao
- Ku Feng as Long Yizhi
- Chan Sing as Chen Zhennan
- Wang Chung as Jin Fen
- Liu Kang as Jin Yi
- Huang Pei-chih as Chen Jie
- Wang Kuang-Yu as Fan Yunhe

== Release ==
The New One-Armed Swordsman was distributed in Hong Kong on February 7, 1971.

Guo Tinghong won the award for Best Editing at the 9th 1971 Taiwan Golden Horse Awards.

== Reception ==
=== Box office ===
It grossed a total of HK$1,596,530 domestically. Overseas in France, the film sold 564,061 tickets upon release in 1973, making it the year's 64th highest-grossing film in France.

=== Critical response ===
From contemporary reviews, Tony Rayns of the Monthly Film Bulletin reviewed an 86-minute version of the film. Rayns noted the introductory scene involving a severed limb decaying in a tree set "an uncharacteristically Gothic tone for this Shaw production; and the tone is maintained by the sombre production design, the under-lit interiors and the setting of several key scenes at night." Rayns found that "despite these distinctive inflections The New One-Armed Swordsman is rather poorly directed and photographed (with a Michael Winner-like reliance on 'dramatic' zooms), but the genre is strong enough to withstand the handicap and heroic fantasy wins out."
