= The Female Prince =

1964 Hong Kong film by Chow Sze-loke

- Theatrical poster
- Directed by: Chow Sze-Loke
- Written by: Chang Cheh
- Produced by: Run Me Shaw
- Starring: Ivy Ling Po; Chin Han; Chin Feng
- Distributed by: Shaw Brothers Studio; Intercontinental Video
- Release date: 1964
- Running time: 102 minutes
- Country: Hong Kong
- Language: Mandarin

The Female Prince (Chinese: 双凤奇缘; pinyin: Shuang feng ji yuan) is a 1964 Shaw Brothers Studio Hong Kong Huangmei opera musical film directed by Chow Sze-Loke, written by Chang Cheh and starring Ivy Ling Po.

== Plot ==
The Qin family is wealthy and Master Qin has three children: Qin Feng Xiao (Ivy Ling Po) and Feng Sheng (Chin Feng) from his late wife, and a third son from his current wife. The second wife is always causing problems between Feng Xiao and Feng Sheng and their father. Feng Sheng leaves home to take the Imperial exams but is robbed and left for dead. He is rescued by a General who happens to pass by.

In the meantime, the stepmother schemes to have Feng Xiao marry her cousin, a rich and powerful lord, while framing her fiance, Li Ru Long (Chin Han) for burglary and sending him to prison. Feng Xiao is a virtuous girl and refuses to break up her engagement with Ru Long. With her maid, Chun Lan (Li Ching), Feng Xiao disguises as a man to travel in hopes to find her brother. After many months of searching, the two cannot find Feng Sheng.

The day of the Imperial exams approaches. At Chun Lan's suggestion, Feng Xiao takes the exams under her fiance's alias, Li Ru Long. If she wins first place and becomes an Imperial official, she hopes to have the power to free Li Ru Long.

As fate would have it, Feng Xiao indeed places first in the exam. She is sent to meet the Emperor, who is pleased and later arranges for scholar to marry the Princess.

At this time, Feng Sheng pays "Li Ru Long" a visit. Feng Sheng is now renamed Qi Cai Sheng because he was adopted by the general Qi after his rescue. Feng Sheng/Qi Cai Sheng hears that the name of new Top Scholar is Li Ru Long, whom he thinks may be the fiance of his sister Feng Xiao. Brother and sister come face to face and eventually recognize one another. Each tells the other what has occurred. While they have not thought of a solution for Feng Xiao, an Imperial order arrives: Feng Xiao, alias Li Ru Long, is to get married at once to the Princess.

Unable to refuse and to explain, Feng Xiao finds herself on the wedding night.

As the night progresses, a very confused Princess Anning waits for her Prince Consort. At wit's end, Feng Xiao finally confesses to the Princess that she is actually a woman. Understandably, the Princess becomes furious. But after much dialogue, she agrees to forgive Feng Xiao and to help her.

The next day, the two go to see the Emperor, presenting the case to him as "original story". Amused monarch proposes a solution for emperor within the story to adopt the brave girl as a princess, release her arrested fiance and let them marry, and is caught by Princess to pledge on it, but as Feng Xiao reveals herself, he is so angry he orders to execute her. However, with the Princess' pleading and Feng Sheng's petition, the Emperor forgives Feng Xiao and does as promised arranging the double wedding — new pair of "princess (adopted) with Li Ru Long" and Princess Anning with Qi Cai Sheng.

== Cast ==
- Ivy Ling Po as Qin Feng Xiao
- Chin Han as Li Ru Long
- Chin Feng as Qin Feng Sheng / Qi Zai Sheng
