= The Twelve Gold Medallions =

1970 Hong Kong film by Cheng Gang

- 十二金牌
- Directed by: Cheng Gang
- Screenplay by: Cheng Gang
- Story by: Ni Kuang; Chen Tieh-i
- Produced by: Run Run Shaw
- Starring: Elliot Ngok; Chin Ping; Cheng Miu; Lisa Chiao Chiao
- Cinematography: Pao Hsueh-li; Charles Tung
- Edited by: Chiang Hsing-lung
- Music by: Wang Fu-ling
- Production company: Shaw Brothers Studio
- Distributed by: Shaw Brothers Studio
- Release date: 7 January 1970
- Country: Hong Kong
- Language: Mandarin

The Twelve Gold Medallions (十二金牌) is a 1970 Hong Kong wuxia film directed by Cheng Gang and produced by the Shaw Brothers Studio, starring Elliot Ngok, Chin Ping, Cheng Miu, and Lisa Chiao Chiao.

== Synopsis ==
The film is set in 12th-century China during the wars between the Song and Jin dynasties. Qin Hui, the treacherous Song chancellor, has been secretly in contact with the enemy. He uses the emperor's name to issue gold medallions to the Song general Yue Fei, ordering him to return from the frontline to the capital.

Miao Long, a righteous swordsman from Mount Hua, learns about Qin Hui's plan so he leads like-minded heroes from the jianghu to intercept the medallions and prevent them from reaching Yue Fei. At the same time, they have to stop the killers sent by the martial arts clan Juxian Hall to assassinate Yue Fei.

After Miao Long completes his mission and passes the medallions to his master Jin Yantang, he is shocked to discover that his master has sworn allegiance to Qin Hui and resent the medallions to Yue Fei. In exchange, Qin Hui has recognised Jin Yantang as the new clan leader. Miao Long finds himself caught in a moral dilemma – especially since he is also in love with Jin Yantang's daughter Jin Shuo – and eventually chooses to turn against his master for the greater good.

== Cast ==
- Elliot Ngok as Miao Lung
- Chin Ping as Jin Shuo
- Cheng Miu as Jin Yantang
- Lisa Chiao Chiao as Jin Huan
- Wang Hsieh as Ma Shanting
- Wong Chung-shun as Lei Ting
- Yeung Chi-hing as Song Qicheng
- Ku Feng as Lu Yigui
- Lu Wei as Hu Quan
- Goo Man-chung as Meng Dabei
- Jeng Man-jing as Meng Xiang
- Cheng Wen-ching as Meng Dabei's daughter
- Fan Mei-sheng, Ma Ying and Tong Tin-hei as the Three Killers of Pingling
