= Killer Darts =

1968 Hong Kong film by Ho Meng-hua

- DVD cover art
- 追魂鏢
- Directed by: Ho Meng-hua
- Written by: Tu Yun-chih
- Produced by: Run Run Shaw
- Starring: Elliot Ngok; Chin Ping
- Cinematography: Lam Gwok-cheung
- Edited by: Chiang Hsing-lung
- Music by: Stanley Chow
- Production company: Shaw Brothers Studio
- Distributed by: Shaw Brothers Studio
- Release date: 9 May 1968
- Running time: 84 minutes
- Country: Hong Kong
- Language: Mandarin

Killer Darts (追魂鏢) is a 1968 Hong Kong wuxia film produced by the Shaw Brothers Studio and directed by Ho Meng-hua, starring Elliot Ngok and Chin Ping.

== Synopsis ==
Liu Wenlong's home is attacked by bandits led by Zhou Chao and his wife is killed. Their son, Yulang, survives after being saved by a servant, who hides with him in a well. Liu then takes along his apprentice, Hu Zifeng, to seek revenge on the bandits. Along the way, Liu catches Hu attempting to rape a woman. Hu kills the woman with a dart stolen from his master and flees. Liu then adopts the victim's orphaned daughter, Yuchan, and raises her together with Yulang. He also decides to give up on vengeance.

Yulang and Yuchan grow up together and fall in love. One day, Yuchan encounters Hu Zifeng, who uses the stolen dart to mislead her into believing that Liu Wenlong was the one who killed her mother.

== Cast ==
- Chin Ping as Jin Yuchan
- Elliot Ngok as Liu Yulang
- Fang Mian as Liu Wenlong
- Shen Yi as Lin Xiangqin
- Peng Peng as Ah-fu
- Chang Pei-shan as Hu Zifeng
- Ma Ying as Zhou Chao
- Cheung Yuk-kam as Hua Yuefang
- Ku Feng as Diao Zhongbiao
- Tang Di as Jinguang Toutuo
- Woo Tung as Master Lin
- Ngai Ping-ngo as Caoshangfei
