= Li Li-hua =

Chinese actress

- 李麗華
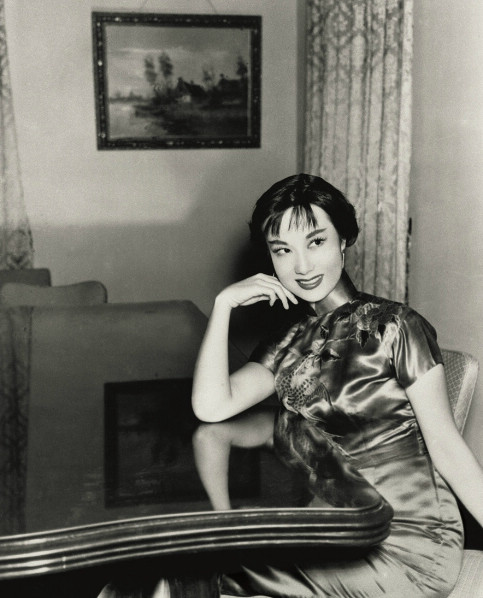
- Li photographed by Lang Jingshan in 1955
- Born: 17 July 1924; Shanghai, Republic of China
- Died: 19 March 2017 (aged 92); Hong Kong, China
- Years active: 1940–1978
- Spouses: Zhang Xupu (m. 1943; div. 1949) Yan Jun (嚴俊) (m. 1957; died 1980)
- Children: Maggie Zhang (daughter); Yan Delan (daughter)
- Awards: Hong Kong Film Awards – Lifetime Achievement; 2016 Golden Horse Awards – Best Actress; 1965 Between Tears and Laughter; 1969 Storm over the Yangtze River; Lifetime Achievement; 2015
- Musical career
- Also known as: Li Hua Li; Teresa Li

Li Li-hua (Chinese: 李麗華; 17 July 1924 – 19 March 2017) was a Chinese actress, better known as an actress from the Shaw Brothers Studio. In 1957, Li married Hong Kong actor and director Yan Jun (嚴俊) (17 December 1917 – 18 August 1980).

== Life and career ==
Li Li-hua was born on 17 July 1924, in Shanghai. She was the daughter of the famous Beijing Opera actor Li Guifang (李桂芳). At age 12, she moved to Beijing and studied Beijing Opera. Four years later she moved to Shanghai and joined the Yihua Film Company. Her first movie was 3 Smiles (三笑) which was released in two parts in 1940. Her final movie was New Dream of the Red Chamber (新紅樓夢) in 1978, after which she retired and moved to the United States. She acted in over one hundred twenty movies during her 38-year career. In 1969 she was awarded the Golden Horse Best Actress award for Storm over the Yangtze River (揚子江風雲). In 2015 she was awarded the Lifetime Achievement Award at the 52nd Golden Horse Awards. In April 2016 she was honored with a Hong Kong Film Awards Lifetime Achievement Award. She died on 19 March 2017, aged 92.

== Sources ==
- Lee, Lily Xiaohong; Stefanowska, A D; Wiles, Sue (2002). Biographical Dictionary of Chinese Women : The Twentieth Century, 1912–2000. London; New York: Routledge. ISBN 0765607980.
- Zhang, Junxiang; Cheng, Jihua, eds. (1995). 中国电影大辞典 [China Cinema Encyclopaedia] (in Chinese). Shanghai: 辞书出版社. ISBN 7-5326-0326-1.
