= The Three Smiles =

1969 Hong Kong film by Yueh Feng

- Film poster
- Directed by: Yueh Feng
- Written by: Yueh Feng
- Produced by: Runme Shaw
- Starring: Ivy Ling Po; Li Ching
- Cinematography: Pao Hsueh Li
- Edited by: Chiang Hsing-Lung
- Music by: Wang Fu-Ling
- Production company: Shaw Brothers Studio
- Release date: 23 September 1969 (Hong Kong)
- Running time: 90 minutes
- Country: Hong Kong
- Language: Mandarin

The Three Smiles (Chinese: 三笑; pinyin: San xiao) is a 1969 Mandarin-language Hong Kong film, directed by Yueh Feng. It is considered the last film of the huangmei opera films golden age.

== Plot ==
Tang Bo Hu (Ivy Ling Po) was a talented and well-educated scholar. Well-to-do and famous in the Jiangnan region, he cared nothing for fame and fortune but spent his time roaming the country, enjoying leisure, poetry and song.

One day, Tang Bo Hu happened to be at the entrance to a Buddhist Temple when Lady Hua, the wife of a rich, important, high-ranking official, arrived with an entourage of attending maids, servants, and porters. Tang heard the whispers of bystanders that Lady Hua's maids were renowned for their beauty. Curious, he stopped to watch. One of the maids, who was extraordinarily pretty, caught his eye. Tang followed the group into the temple and overheard that the maid's name was Autumn Fragrance (Li Ching).

Unable to resist, Tang playfully knelt next to Autumn Fragrance as she prayed. He flirted with her and pinned her skirt with his knee, preventing her from leaving. Another maid came to Autumn Fragrance's aid and together the two women left the temple, with Tang trailing them. As Autumn Fragrance entered her palanquin, she gave a shy smile to Tang Bo Hu.

Lady Hua's party returned home on a boat. Tang hired the services of a rower and followed them. On the river, Tang got the rower to sing teasing songs to Autumn Fragrance. Annoyed, she threw a basin of water over to the side, which soaked Tang. Feeling sorry for what she'd done, she smiled gently again.

Tang Bo Hu followed Lady Hua's entourage back to their mansion. He tried to make small talk with Autumn Fragrance. She was annoyed, a mood which quickly shifted to amusement. Then she gave him a third smile. After the third smile, the scholar fell, head over heels in love with Autumn Fragrance. He went to the Hua mansion and tried to figure out a way to make his way inside. Seeing that the Hua's chief butler was kind, Tang put on the disguise of a poor youth from afar who had been robbed of all his money. The butler took pity upon him and introduced him to the Grand Tutor, who hired him as a pageboy. Tang was now renamed Hua An in the Grand Tutor's household.

== Cast ==
- Ivy Ling Po
- Li Ching
