= 2nd Golden Horse Awards =

1963 film awards ceremony in Taiwan

- Date: October 30, 1963
- Site: Kuo Kuang Cinema, Taipei, Taiwan
- Organized by: Taipei Golden Horse Film Festival Executive Committee

Highlights
- Best Feature Film: The Love Eterne
- Best Director: Li Han-hsiang; The Love Eterne
- Best Actor: Tang Ching; From Dusk till Dawn
- Best Actress: Betty Loh; The Love Eterne
- Most awards: The Love Eterne (5)

The 2nd Golden Horse Awards (Chinese: 第2屆金馬獎) took place on October 30, 1963 at Kuo Kuang Cinema in Taipei, Taiwan.

== Winners and nominees ==
Winners are listed first, highlighted in boldface.

**Best Feature Film**: **The Love Eterne**; From Dusk till Dawn (runner-up); Empress Wu Tse-Tien (runner-up); Father Takes a Bride (runner-up)	**Best Documentary**: **Fishing Industry in Taiwan**; 51st National Day of the Republic of China (runner-up); Today's Taiwan (runner-up)
**Golden Horse Grant**: **Bai Yun Gu Xiang**; **Liang Hung Yu**	**Best Director**: **Li Han-hsiang — The Love Eterne**
**Best Leading Actor**: **Tang Ching — From Dusk till Dawn**	**Best Leading Actress**: **Betty Loh — The Love Eterne**
**Best Supporting Actor**: **Ma Ji — Bai Yun Gu Xiang**	**Best Supporting Actress**: **Margaret Tu — Wu Shan Chun Hui**
**Best Child Star**: **Luo Wan-lin — In the Neighbourhood**	**Best Screenplay**: **Yueh Feng — Bitter Sweet**
**Best Cinematography - Color** —	**Best Cinematography - Black-and-White**: **He Luying — Little Lotus**
**Best Film Editing**: **Chiang Hsing-lung — The Love Eterne**	**Best Music**: **Chow Lan-ping — The Love Eterne**
**Best Sound Recording** —	**Best Cinematography for Documentary**: **Chen Yu-po — Fishing Industry in Taiwan**
**Best Planning for Documentary**: **Hsiung Kuang — 51st National Day of the Republic of China**	**Special Award - Outstanding Performance**: **Ivy Ling — The Love Eterne**
**Special Award of Social Education**: **Wu Feng — Made-in-Taiwan**
