= Ivy Ling Po =

Chinese actress and opera singer (born 1939)

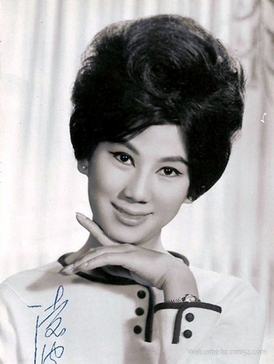
- Portrait of Ling Po
- Born: Huang Yu-chun (黃裕君); 16 November 1939 (age 86); Shantou, Guangdong, China
- Occupations: Actress; singer
- Years active: 1949–1980s
- Spouses: Shi Weixiong (m. 1956; div. 1958) (child marriage with a married man forced by her foster mother) Chin Han (m. 1966)
- Children: 3, including Kenneth Bi (b. 1967)
- Awards: Asian Film Festival; Best Actress; 1964 Lady General Hua Mu-lan Golden Horse Awards – Special Jury Award; 1963 The Love Eterne; Best Actress; 1967 Too Late for Love

Chinese name
- Traditional Chinese: 凌波
- Simplified Chinese: 凌波
Transcriptions
Standard Mandarin
- Hanyu Pinyin: Líng Bō
Yue: Cantonese
- Jyutping: Ling^{4} Bo^{1}
- Musical career
- Origin: Hong Kong
- Genres: Huangmei opera Cantonese opera Amoy opera

Huang Yuet-chu (born November 16, 1939), known professionally by her stage name Ivy Ling Po, is a retired actress and Chinese opera singer from Hong Kong. She gained widespread fame during the 1960s for her roles in several popular Huangmei opera films; most notably The Love Eterne (1963).

Ling Po initially acted in Amoy Hokkien's films under the stage name Xiaojuan (Chinese: 小娟; Pe̍h-ōe-jī: Sió-koan), then in Cantonese films under Shen Yan (Chinese: 沈雁; Jyutping: Sam^{2} Ngaan^{6}), before joining the Shaw Brothers Studio to act in Mandarin films as (Ivy) Ling Po (Chinese: 凌波; pinyin: Líng Bō).

== Early life ==
Huang Yu-chun was born on November 16, 1939, in Shantou, Guangdong. As a child, she was sold to a family in Xiamen. She was given the name Jun Haitang (Chinese: 君海棠; Pe̍h-ōe-jī: Kun Hái-tông) and worked as a domestic maid. After reaching preadolescence, her adoptive mother forced her to enter the movie industry in Hong Kong. Ling Po claimed she did not have a childhood and was often scolded and physically punished by her adoptive mother. Before Ling Po turned 18 years, her adoptive mother sold her to Chinese-Filipino businessman Shi Weixiong, with whom Ling Po had a son, Shi Yonghui.

In 1957, Shi Weixiong funded the establishment of the Huasha Film Company, which specialized in producing Mandarin-language films. Wu Baoxi and Ling Po—who starred in most of Huasha's productions under the name 'Xiao Juan'—served as producers. During the filming of The Love Eterne, Ling Po—unwilling to meet her adoptive mother's request to attend Weixiong's dinner—moved into the Shaw dormitory with the protection and support of director Li Hanxiang, who freed her from the control of her adoptive parents.

== Career ==
=== 1950s–1960s ===
Ling Po resided in Xiamen before moving to Hong Kong. Her first screen appearance was in the Ha-Yuen movie Love of Young People (1951) at the age of twelve, under the name of Xiao Juan. In addition to appearing in more than 50 Hokkien movies, she was dubbed for other movie companies, particularly Huangmei operas for Shaw Brothers.

While Ling Po was dubbing the Shaw Brothers' opera Dream of the Red Chamber, she caught the attention of Li Han-hsiang, who cast her as Liang Shanbo in The Love Eterne (Liang Shanbo yu Zhu Yingtai, also known as Liang Zhu or The Butterfly Lovers) in 1962 with Betty Loh Ti. The judges at the second Golden Horse Awards were so impressed by her performance that they created a special award for her, citing her Outstanding Performance. In 1963, a publicity appearance brought traffic in Taipei to a halt, as thousands of women came to see Ivy Ling Po.

In 1964, Ling Po received the coveted title of Asian Movie Queen, when she won the Best Actress award at the 11th Asian Film Festival for her performance in Lady General Hua Mulan. The following year, she would win the Most Versatile Talent award at the 12th Asian Film Festival, for her role as a young prince in The Grand Substitution and a scholar in The Mermaid.

She became the leading figure in the Huangmei opera genre and was usually cast in male roles. Every year, without fail, Ling Po would make lists of the top ten stars in Hong Kong, based on polls conducted by magazines and newspapers.

To avoid being typecast, she auditioned for various roles in both wuxia and contemporary genres. For playing the ill-fated wife of Kwan Shan in Too Late for Love, one of her contemporary outings, she won the Golden Horse Best Actress award.

=== 1970s–1980s ===
In 1975, Ling Po won the Golden Horse Best Supporting Actress award for her role as a neglected empress in Li Han-hsiang's The Empress Dowager, despite limited screen time in the sprawling epic. After her contract with Shaw Brothers Studio ended in 1975, she went on to appear in other films and television series with her husband. She won another Golden Horse for Best Actress, for My Father, My Husband, My Son, in which she aged from a teenager to an old woman. Her last screen appearance was in the movie Golden Swallow (1987), playing an evil witch. She then retired after the movie and emigrated with her husband, Chin Han, and her three sons to Toronto, Ontario, Canada in 1989.

=== 2000s ===
Eighteen miles away (十八相送)
A Huangmei opera song by veteran artist Ivy Ling Po partnering with Jenny Tseng.

Ivy Ling Po's career revived in 2002 when she was cast with another veteran Shaw actress, Hu Chin, in a stage production of Butterfly Lovers. Two original cast members, Li Kun, and Jen Chieh, reprised their respective roles. She toured extensively with this production, bringing it to Malaysia, Singapore, Taiwan, and the United States. Ivy Po restaged the production two years later in Taiwan.

Ling Po has performed in concerts in Taiwan, the United States, and Malaysia. Her two concerts at Genting Malaysia in 2005 included Hu Chin, Chin Hsiang Lin, and Yueh Hua.

In 2006, Ling Po performed at the Hong Kong Coliseum as part of a large group of singers for the Everlasting Golden Hits concert. She sang her signature songs from The Love Eterne, duetting with Liza Wang, who sang the part of Zhu Yingtai. She also performed her version of "Jiao Dao" from The Crimson Palm.

In April 2004, Ling Po was among the first Hong Kong celebrities who opened the Avenue of Stars in Tsim Sha Tsui, adding her handprints and signature. In January 2006, Ling Po was awarded the WIFTI-HK Professional Achievement Award, with the re-release and screening of the remastered film The 14 Amazons at the Hong Kong Visual Arts Centre. In October 2006, Ivy Ling Po, Hu Chin, and Xie Lei performed at Star City in Sydney, Australia. Ling Po also performed at the Frances Yip S.U.C.C.E.S.S. concert, held at the Queen Elizabeth Theatre in Vancouver on 30 October 2006.

== Awards ==
- Special Award: Outstanding Performance (2nd Golden Horse Awards) – Love Eterne (1963)
- Best Actress (11th Asian Film Festival, 1964) – Lady General Hua Mulan (1964)
- Most Versatile Talent (12th Asian Film Festival, 1965) – The Mermaid (1965)
- Best Actress (6th Golden Horse Awards, 30 October 68) – Too Late for Love (1966)
- Best Actress (20th Asian Film Festival, 15 June 74) – Father, Husband, Son
- Best Supporting Actress (Asian Film Festival) – Empress Dowager (1975)
- WIFTI-HK Professional Achievement Award (2006) presented during RR of 14 Amazons in HK.

== Filmography ==
Titles & dates of release courtesy of Hong Kong Film Archive

- RR = remastered and released on DVD
- R = released without being remastered probably in the wrong aspect ratio

=== Amoy (Hokkien) films ===
- Love of Young People – 1951
- Judge Bao Judges Yueying – 20 November 1955
- The Phoenix's Flirtation With Twin Dragons (Meng Lijun, The Sequel) – 25 November 1955
- Meng Jiangnu's Wail Shattered The Great Wall – 6 July 1955
- Meng Lijun (A Reborn Love) – 26 August 1955
- The Cowherd and the Weaving Girl – 8 September 1955
- The Story of Third Madam Li – 12 May 1955
- Liang Shanbo & Zhu Yingtai – 3 August 1955
- Xuemei Teaches Her Son – 15 September 1955
- Chen Shimei Denies His Wife – 20 September 1955
- Love's Obligation – 13 April 1955
- Flower Terrace – 15 November 1956
- The Death of Daiyu (Back To Heaven) – 18 May 1956
- The Phoenix Returns Home – 6 June 1956
- Tiger Wang Snatches His Bride – 11 May 1956
- Lady Red-Broom – 11 February 1956
- Dream of the Red Chamber – 22 November 1956
- An'an Searches For His Mother – 20 December 1956
- Lianli Gives Birth To Han Qi – 22 May 1956
- Nazha Creates Havoc in the East Sea – 21 February 1956
- Wang Zhaojun – 26 April 1956
- Judge Bao's Night Trial of Guo Huai – 2 December 1956
- Madam Zhou Cheng in Search of Her Husband – 13 December 1956
- 8 Immortals in Jiangnan (8 Immortals Cross The Sea) – 24 May 1957
- Monk Ji Gong – 4 April 1957
- Peach Blossom Weeps Blood – 6 June 1957
- Third Madam Teaches Her Son – 2 October 1957
- Xiaofeng – 5 November 1957
- Mulian Saves His Mother – 3 November 1957
- Love Mismatched – 14 February 1957
- Strange Tales of an Empty Chest – 6 May 1957
- Burning of Red Lotus Temple – 1 February 1957
- Meeting on the Magpies Bridge – 21 September 1957
- Burning of Red Lotus Temple, The Sequel – 2 February 1957
- True And False Romance – 12 October 1957
- The Battle Between Red Kid & Monkey King – 18 January 1957
- Xuemei Misses Her Husband – 26 February 1958
- Choosing A Son-In-Law – 17 September 1958
- Lu Mengzheng Wins The Bride's Embroidered Ball – 8 May 1958
- Mr. Wang Marries His Daughter To Hong Kong – 22 November 1958
- Hot Lady – 19 May 1958
- Discarded Body in a Bathroom – 7 August 1958
- Shrews From Afar – 5 June 1958
- Marry into Your Own Class – 4 April 1958
- Harmony Between The In-Laws – 3 July 1958
- Teddy Girls – 30 October 1958
- The True Story of Mazhu – 1 January 1958
- Crossroads – 24 September 1958
- Burning of Red Lotus Temple Part 3 – 14 January 1959
- Burning of Red Lotus Temple Part 4 – 17 January 1959
- Queen of Folk Songs – 17 April 1959
- Miss Jinfeng – 28 March 1959
- I Love Young Men – 17 June 1959
- Suffer for My Wife – 8 September 1959
- Brother Wang And Brother Liu – 1959
- Miss Singapore – 3 September 1959
- He Has Taken Her For Another – 4 September 1959
- Miss Cuicui – 7 February 1959
- Phony Phoenixes – 31 July 1959
- Mr. Wang Throws A Birthday Party – 3 April 1959
- A Perfect Match – 11 March 1959
- Who Is Not Amorous? – 21 February 1959
- The Love of a Pedicab Driver – 16 January 1959
- Who Is The Murderer? – 16 April 1959
- A Girl in Love – 27 March 1959
- True Love – 14 January 1959
- The Maiden Catches The Culprit – 24 December 1959
- Mr. Wang's New Year – 21 February 1959
- Liu Hai Meets Fairy – 1961
- Little Wild Cat (Xiao Ye Mao) – date of release unknown
- Long Feng Pei – 7 November 1957
- Secret Swordswoman (Shen Mi Nu Xia) – date of release unknown
- Zai Jia Xin Niang – date of release unknown
- Fan Li Hua – date of release unknown

=== Cantonese films ===
- Seven Daughters of Tsoi – 21 February 1962
- The Grandest of All Families – 13 February 1962
- The Little Happy Star – 9 February 1962
- Renegade (The Criminals) – 19 April 1963
- Cantonese Opera: Fu Gwai Wing Wah Tai Yat Ka (with Yam Kim Fai) – date of release unknown

=== Shaw Brothers Studio ===
==== Huangmei Opera Dubbings ====
- Dream of the Red Chamber – 2 August 1962 (RR – 2004)
- Return of the Phoenix – 24 July 1963 (RR – 2007)
- The Adulteress (Xiao Bai Cai) – 8 August 1963 (RR – 2006)
- The Lotus Lamp – 8 July 1965 (RR – 2004)
- The Pearl Phoenix – 4 February 1967 (RR – 2003)

==== Huangmei opera films ====
- Hung Niang – 1962 (not released; see last paragraph in biography)
- The Love Eterne – 3 April 1963 (RR – 2003)
- A Maid From Heaven (Seven Fairies) – 11 December 1963 (RR – 2004)
- Lady General Hua Mu-lan – 18 June 1964 (RR – 2004)
- The Crimson Palm – 28 October 1964 (RR-2007)
- The Female Prince – 10 December 1964 (RR – 2006)
- Inside The Forbidden City – 16 October 1965 (RR – 2003)
- The Grand Substitution – 15 April 1965 (RR – 2003)
- The Mermaid – 29 January 1965 (RR – 2005)
- The West Chamber – 10 October 1965 (RR – 2004)
- Dawn Will Come – 2 March 1966
- The Perfumed Arrow – 23 November 1966
- The Mirror and the Lichee – 9 November 1967 (RR – 2006)
- Forever And Ever – 20 January 1968
- The Three Smiles – 24 September 1969 (RR – 2003)

==== Wuxia/martial arts films ====
- Temple of the Red Lotus – 1 October 1965 (RR – 2003)
- The Twin Swords – 1965 (RR – Mar 2007)
- Sword and the Lute – 21 April 1967 (RR – 2006)
- Duel for Gold – 16 November 1971 (RR – Dec 2006)
- The Mighty One – 1972 (RR – July 2006)
- The Crimson Charm – 16 July 1971 (RR – 2005)
- The 14 Amazons – 27 July 1972 (RR – 2006)
- Finger of Doom – 14 April 1972 (RR – 2005)
- Flight Man (The Daredevil) – 1972
- Unarmed Combat – 1972, incomplete

==== Contemporary films ====
- Between Tears and Smiles – 18 January 1964 (RR – 2005)
- Vermilion Door – 26 August 1965 (RR – 2003)
- The Mating Season (Guest Star) – 1966
- Song of Tomorrow – 12 October 1967 (RR – 2005)
- Too Late For Love – 29 March 1967 (RR – 2003)
- Raw Passions – 4 September 1969 (RR – 2005)
- The Younger Generation – 12 March 1970 (RR – 2003)
- A Cause To Kill – 15 January 1970 (RR – 2004)
- The Silent Love – 2 April 1971 (RR – 2003)
- It's All in the Family – 1974 (RR – 2006)

==== Historical drama films ====
- Empress Dowager – 21 March 1975 (RR – 2003)
- The Last Tempest – 21 February 1976 (RR – 2003)

=== Post-Shaw Brothers ===
==== Huangmei opera films & TV productions ====
- Dream of the Red Chamber – 18 May 1978 (R on LD & VCD in 1993; OUT OF PRINT)
- The Imperious Princess (Jin Hsi Yu Ye) – 25 July 1980 (R on LD & VCD in 1990; OUT OF PRINT)
- Imperial Matchmaker – 1982 (R on VCD in Malaysia by Zestbase)
- Butterfly Lovers 40 – 2002 [Stage] (RR – 2003)
- The Lute (Pi Pa Ji) – TV movie release date unknown (RR on DVD in Taiwan without English subs)

Notes:

1. The Dream of the Red Chamber and The Imperious Princess have been remastered by Warner Bros and screened on Celestial Channel. Both remastered prints are in the correct aspect ratio of 2.35:1 with English subtitles.
2. Imperial Matchmaker marked the only pairing on film of two famed male impersonators: Ivy Ling Po and Yang Lihua.
3. The Imperious Princess marked the final Huangmei dubbing of Ivy Ling Po & Tsin Ting together on film. Tsin Ting is billed as Kwok Tsin Ting in the credits.

==== Wuxia/martial arts films ====
- The Chinese Amazons (Women Soldiers) – 11 February 1975 (R on Tai Seng VHS in USA; OUT OF PRINT)
- The Prominent Eunuch Chen Ho – 18 October 1977 (R on LD & VCD; OUT OF PRINT)
- A Rescue From Hades (Mulian Saves His Mother) – release date unknown
- 15 Female Warriors of the Sa Family – 1981
- Long Nuu Xin Fan (Dragon Girl Descends From Heaven) – 1982
- New Pilgrims to the West – 1986
- Liu Zhu Hui Nen Zuan (Legend of Liu Zhu Hui Nen Buddha) – 1987
- Golden Swallow – 16 December 1987 (RR – 2002)

Notes:

1. The Prominent Eunuch Chen Ho was retitled The Great Chase for its LaserDisc and VCD release. The LaserDisc version features an English soundtrack which is not available on VCD.
2. Ivy Ling Po has cameos in both A Rescue From Hades and New Pilgrims to the West as Kuan Yin, the Goddess of Mercy.
3. A Rescue From Hades has been remastered in the correct aspect ratio of 2.35:1 with English subtitles and screened on Celestial Channel.
4. 15 Female Warriors of the Sa Family reunites Ivy Ling Po with ex-Shaw stars Ching Li & Chiao Chiao. This movie also co-stars Kue Ya Lei as the eldest sister, Tang Lan Hua and Han Hsiang Chin. The villain is played by Chen Hsing.

==== Drama films ====
- Father, Husband, Son – 1974
- Crossroad – 1976
- Mother – 1982 (R on Tai Seng VHS in USA dubbed in Cantonese)
- The Lost Generation (Chinese: 風水二十年; pinyin: fēngshuǐ èrshí nián) – 1983

Notes:

1. Crossroad has been remastered by Warner Bros in the correct aspect ratio of 2.35:1 with English subtitles and screened on Celestial channel.
2. The Lost Generation grossed HK$1.548M and starred Chen Chen, Ivy Ling Po, Betty Ting Pei, Paul Chang Chung, Kwan Shan, Jenny Tseng, Chin Han (Ivy's husband), Yi Lei, Roy Chiao, Rosemund Kwan, Sibelle Hu, Kue Ya Lei, Chen Kuan Tai, Ke Chun Hsiung and Ching Miao among other stars. Written and directed by Liu Chia Chang.

==== Television ====
- Eight Thousand Li of Cloud and Moon
- 7 Lives Becoming Couple (Qi Shi Fu Qi) – 16 April 1972
- Spring in Jiangnan – 1980
- Wu Tu Wu Ming – 1981
- Chang Lang Qi Tan – 1982
- Man Feng He Ming – 13 February 1983
- Qin Gui He Chu – 1984
- Fan Pu – 1986
- Ta Men De Gu Shi – 1986
- Jui Gan Pao Tiao Peng – 1986
- Jin Fen Wang Chao – 1986
- Qin Suo – 1986

== Personal life ==
Ling Po is married to Chin Han. Her children include film director Kenneth Bi.
