= Butterfly Lovers =

Chinese legend

The Butterfly Lovers
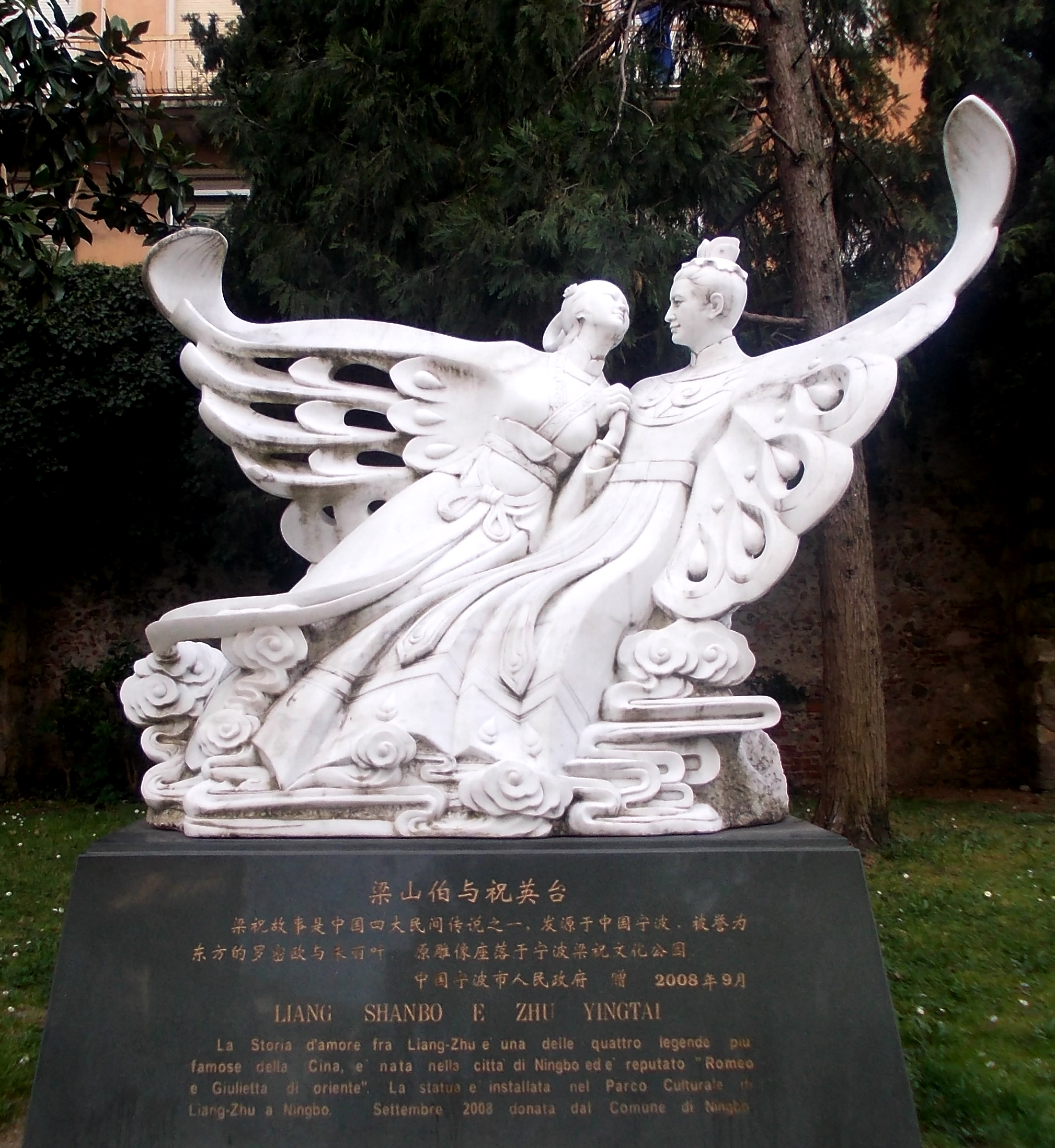
- Monument to Liang Shanbo and Zhu Yingtai near the Tomba di Giulietta in Verona, Italy
- Traditional Chinese: 梁山伯與祝英臺 / 梁山伯與祝英台
- Simplified Chinese: 梁山伯与祝英台
- Literal meaning: Liang Shanbo and Zhu Yingtai
Transcriptions
Standard Mandarin
- Hanyu Pinyin: Liáng Shānbó yǔ Zhù Yīngtái
- Wade–Giles: Liang^{2} Shan^{1}-po^{2} yü^{3} Chu^{4} Ying^{1}-t'ai^{2}
Yue: Cantonese
- Jyutping: Loeng^{4} Saan^{1}-baak^{3} jyu^{5} Zuk^{1} Jing^{1}-toi^{4}

Liang Zhu
- Chinese: 梁祝
Transcriptions
Standard Mandarin
- Hanyu Pinyin: Liáng-Zhù
- Wade–Giles: Liang^{2}-Chu^{4}
Yue: Cantonese
- Jyutping: Loeng^{4} Zuk^{1}

The Butterfly Lovers is a Chinese legend centered around the tragic romance between Liang Shanbo (梁山伯) and Zhu Yingtai (祝英臺), whose names form the Chinese title of the story. The title is often abbreviated as Liang Zhu (梁祝).

The story is a part of Chinese folklore and was selected as one of China's Four Great Folktales by the "Folklore Movement" in the 1920s—the others being the Legend of the White Snake (Baishezhuan), Lady Meng Jiang, and The Cowherd and the Weaving Maid (Niulang Zhinü).

Six cities in China collaborated in 2004 on a formal application for the Proclamation of Masterpieces of the Oral and Intangible Heritage of Humanity on the legend at UNESCO, submitted in 2006 through the Chinese Ministry of Culture.

== Legend ==
The legend of Liang Shanbo and Zhu Yingtai is set in the Eastern Jin dynasty (266–420 AD).

Zhu Yingtai is the ninth child and only daughter of the wealthy Zhu family of Shangyu, Zhejiang. Although women are traditionally discouraged from taking up scholarly pursuits, Zhu manages to convince her father to allow her to attend classes in disguise as a man. During her journey to Hangzhou, she meets Liang Shanbo, a scholar from Kuaiji (present-day Shaoxing). They chat and feel a strong affinity for each other at their first meeting. Hence, they gather some soil as incense and take an oath of fraternity in the pavilion of a wooden bridge.

They study together for the next three years in school and Zhu gradually falls in love with Liang. Although Liang equals Zhu in their studies, he is still a bookworm and fails to notice that his classmate is a woman.

A Qingtian stone carving depicting Liang Shanbo and Zhu Yingtai

One day, Zhu receives a letter from her father, asking her to return home as soon as possible. Zhu has no choice but to pack her belongings immediately and bid Liang farewell. However, in her heart, she has already confessed her love for Liang and is determined to be with him for all eternity. Before her departure, she reveals her true identity to the headmaster's wife and asks her to pass a jade pendant to Liang as a betrothal gift.

Liang accompanies his "sworn brother" for 18 miles to see her off. During the journey, Zhu hints to Liang that she is actually a woman. For example, she compares them to a pair of mandarin ducks (a symbol of lovers in Chinese culture), but Liang does not catch her hints and does not even have the slightest suspicion that his companion is a woman in disguise. Zhu finally comes up with an idea and tells Liang that she will act as a matchmaker for him and Zhu's "sister". Before they part, Zhu reminds Liang to visit her residence later so he can propose to marry her "sister". Liang and Zhu reluctantly part ways at the Changting pavilion.

Months later when Liang visits Zhu, he discovers that she is actually a woman. They are devoted to and passionate about each other and they make a vow to the effect of "till death do us part". The joy of their reunion is short-lived as Zhu's parents have already arranged for her to marry a wealthy merchant, Ma Wencai. Liang is heartbroken when he hears the news and his health gradually deteriorates until he becomes critically ill. He dies in office later as a county magistrate.

On the day of Zhu's marriage to Ma, strong winds prevent the wedding procession from escorting the bride beyond Liang's grave, which lies along the journey. Zhu leaves the procession to pay her respects at Liang's grave. She descends in bitter despair and begs for the grave to open up. Suddenly, the grave opens with a clap of thunder. Without further hesitation, Zhu throws herself into the grave to join Liang. Their spirits emerge in the form of a pair of butterflies and fly away together, never to be separated again.

== Historical accounts ==
The earliest record of the legend can be traced back to the late Tang dynasty. In Shidao Sifan Zhi (十道四蕃志), the author Liang Zaiyan (梁載言) wrote:

The righteous woman Zhu Yingtai was buried together with Liang Shanbo.

In Xuan Shizhi (宣室志), the author Zhang Du (張讀) wrote:

Yingtai, a daughter of the Zhu family of Shangyu, disguised herself as a man and attended school together with Liang Shanbo from Kuaiji. Shanbo's courtesy name was "Churen". Zhu returned home first. Two years later, Shanbo visited her and only knew that she was a woman then. He was disappointed and felt as though he had made a loss. He asked her parents for her hand in marriage but her family had already betrothed her to the Ma family. Shanbo assumed office as a magistrate in Yin (鄞; in present-day western Ningbo) and died of illness later and was buried west of the city of Mao (鄮, in eastern Ningbo). Zhu was on her journey to the Ma residence by boat and passed by Liang's grave. The strong wind and waves prevent the boat from advancing. After learning that it was Shanbo's grave, she set foot on land and broke down. The ground suddenly cracked open and Zhu was buried within. Jin dynasty chancellor Xie An proclaimed the grave as the "Tomb of the Righteous Woman".

The legend was also recorded in various official records such as Yinxian Zhi (鄞縣志), Ningbofu Zhi (寧波府志) and Yixing Jingxi Xinzhi (宜興荊溪新志).

== Liangzhu Culture Park ==
Adjacent to the Yuyao River with a land area of 20 hectares (49 acres), the Liang-Zhu Culture Park features multiple sceneries including "Becoming Sworn Brothers at Thatched Bridge", "Being Classmates for Three Years", "18 Miles of Send-off", "Farewell in the Tower", and "Reunion of Butterfly Lovers" according to the main line of the story Liang Shanbo and Zhu Yingtai. The layout of ancient Chinese architectural style in the lower reaches of the Yangtze River such as kiosks, pavilions, platforms, and towers was adopted against the mountains and waters, realizing a gorgeous effect of diverse landscapes of mountain beyond mountain and garden beyond garden.

== Liang Shanbo Temple ==
Located in Shaojiadu Village, Gaoqiao Town five miles west to Ningbo City, the Liang Shanbo Temple is built with a sitting statue of the couple, with Zhu Yingtai dressed in phoenix coronet and embroidered cape sitting on the right side of Liang Shanbo. The rear hall is their bedroom set with a vermilion wooden bed, behind which is the couple's tomb. People in Ningbo City tend to worship the temple for bliss of eternal love of couples. The Liang Shanbo Temple built in 347 by the locals in memory of Liang Shanbo, who had contributed greatly during his term in office as a magistrate to resolving the problems caused by the flooding of the river. The Liangzhu Cultural Park in Ningbo was built by the locals, with the love story as its main theme. The "Liangzhu Tomb" (梁祝塚), "Liang Shanbo Temple" (梁山伯廟), "Husband and Wife Bridge" (夫妻橋), and Qin Gong (寢宮) are officially recognized by the Chinese Liangzhu Culture Association as culturally significant sites for the birth of the legend.

== Sino-Italian love culture festival held in Verona ==
The Sino-Italian love culture festival was held on Wednesday, 24 September 2008 in the northern Italian city of Verona, co-sponsored by the municipal governments of Verona and Ningbo city. Verona is the literary hometown of Romeo and Juliet, the lead characters in Shakespeare's famous play Romeo and Juliet. Ningbo is the setting for the Chinese classical romantic tragedy Butterfly Lovers, or Liang Zhu. The Butterfly Lovers is also known as the Chinese Romeo and Juliet. A white marble statue portraying Liang Shanbo and Zhu Yingtai, the two lovers who eventually turned into butterflies, was placed in the square in front of the Juliet Museum in central Verona during the festival. Fifteen couples from Ningbo in Chinese-style costumes held a romantic wedding in Verona, with blessings from the locals. Ningbo and Verona became sister cities in October 2005. A delegation from Verona visited Ningbo in 2007 and presented the city with a bronze statue of Juliet.

== Artistic interpretations ==
=== Stage plays and operas ===
The legend has been adapted into traditional Chinese opera in several local varieties, as Liang Zhu in Yue opera and In the Shade of the Willow (柳蔭記) in Sichuan opera. The Yue opera version was made into a colour motion picture in China in 1954. Filming by the Ministry of Culture and the East China Military and Political Commission took place in Zhu's legendary hometown of Shangyu.

Based on the romance, the Shaw Brothers Studio also produced The Love Eterne, a film in Huangmei opera directed by Li Han-hsiang in 1962, starring Ivy Ling Po and Betty Loh Ti.

In May 2001, a group of students from the University of Oxford formed the Liang Zhu Drama Production Company, and rewrote the story into a contemporary drama that was performed in English.

In September 2005, Denise Ho performed in the musical Butterfly Lovers (梁祝下世傳奇) as the leading actress, producer, and musical director. Her album of the same name gave her three Number 1 singles – "Becoming a Butterfly" (化蝶), "Lawrence and Lewis" (勞斯．萊斯), and "Coffee in a Soda Bottle" (汽水樽裡的咖啡), which are all based on the story of the Butterfly Lovers, with possible homosexual themes. These singles helped her to receive the "Female Singer Silver Award" at the Ultimate Song Chart Awards Presentation 2005 (叱吒樂壇流行榜頒獎典禮).

In September 2013, Australian musical theatre company Chinese Music Group performed its annual musical The Butterfly Lover at the Union Theatre at the University of Melbourne. The play, written by Australian journalist and writer Bang Xiao, reformed the storyline with contemporary views, and was delivered in Chinese mandarin with live subtitles in English and Chinese.

The story has been adapted into Vietnamese Cai Luong a number of times, with its Sino-Vietnamese title Lương Sơn Bá – Chúc Anh Đài written by artist and songwriter The lea. ding roles have been played by Vietnamese actors and actresses such as Hương Lan, Phi Nhung, Tái Linh, Phượng Mai, Mạnh Quỳnh, and Vũ Linh. One of the Vietnamese adaptations published by Thuy Nga Productions starring Phi Nhung and Mạnh Quỳnh was cowritten by Viên Hoàng blending the original Vietnamese adaptation and extending the story by using some elements of the 2000 Taiwainese television series into the original story. This includes Ma Wencai's villainous feats which result in Liang Shanbo's death, his destruction of the school and death of his former teacher. Lu Bingzhang a character from the Taiwanese series is also added to this adaptation renamed Lộ Phương played by Chí Linh.

In September 2016, Nation Broadcasting Corporation together with the Musicals Society of Bangkok staged Butterfly Lovers the Musical, featuring Kanyapas Srinarong-Chayanuwat as Zhu Yingtai and Nat Thewphaingam as Liang Shanbo. Music, lyrics and script by Suruj Tipakora-Seni, directed by Victor Kriengsak Silakong, and choreographed by Manaschai Bunchung.

In 2017 English Choreographer Paul James Rooney created and choreographed a ballet version of Butterfly Lovers for Tivoli Ballet Theater, Copenhagen, using the music of the Butterfly Lovers' Violin Concerto.

In 2022, a musical of the same name, loosely based on the legend was staged in Hong Kong's Shouson Theatre, directed and written by Marc Ngan and Amos Wong.

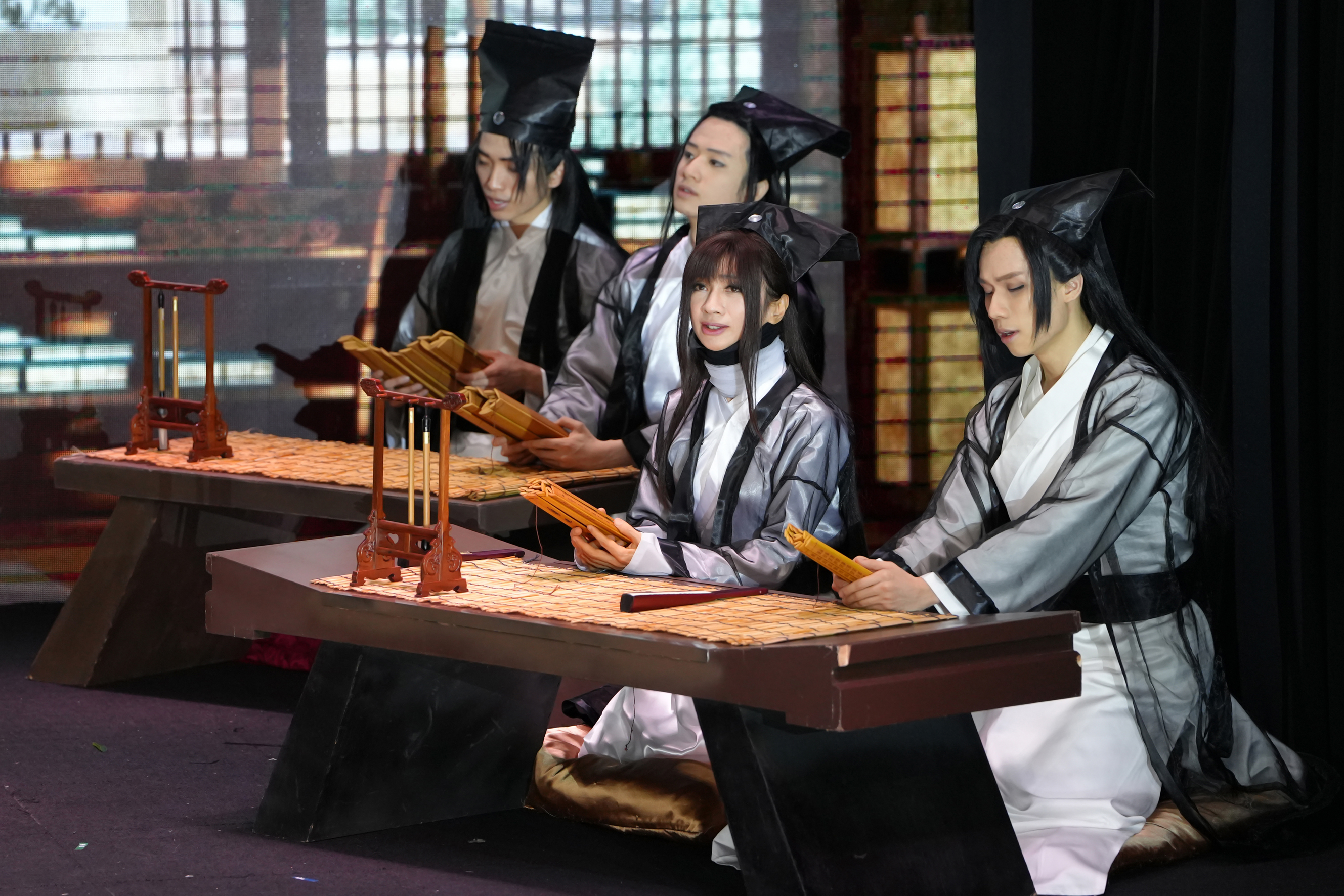
Stage play adaptation of Butterfly Lovers by Symphony Theatre, starring Jessie Chung and Paul Lee

In 2023, Jessie Chung and Paul Lee starred in a stage play adaptation of Butterfly Lovers. The production was brought into being by Malaysia's Symphony Theatre, who gathered an international team of 35 talents from Taiwan, US, Australia, and Malaysia to take on the colossal performance.

=== Film and television ===
==== Film ====
- Sam Pek Eng Tay is a 1931 Dutch East Indies film that was a commercial success.
- The Love Eterne is a 1963 Taiwan musical film of the Huangmei opera genre, directed by Li Han-hsiang, and produced by Shaw Brothers. The artistic and commercial success of this feature was in part due to the casting of Ivy Ling Po, who was a relatively unknown supporting actress before this feature, as the male protagonist by the director Li Han-Hsiang.
- The Lovers is a 1994 Hong Kong film directed by Tsui Hark, starring Charlie Yeung and Nicky Wu.
- The Butterfly Lovers is a 2008 Hong Kong film based on the legend, but in a wuxia setting, directed by Jingle Ma and starring Wu Chun and Charlene Choi.
- The Butterfly Lovers: Leon and Jo (蝴蝶夢－梁山伯與祝英台) is a 2004 Taiwanese animated film directed by Tsai Min-chin, voice-played by Elva Hsiao, Rene Liu, and Jacky Wu.

==== Television ====
- Qishi Fuqi – Liang Shanbo Yu Zhu Yingtai (七世夫妻－梁山伯與祝英台) is a 1999 Taiwanese television series produced by Formosa Television in Hokkien, starring Zhao Jing and Alyssa Chia.
- Xin Liang Shanbo Yu Zhu Yingtai (新梁山伯與祝英台) is a 2000 Taiwanese television series released by CTV, starring Show Lo and Noel Leung.
- Butterfly Lovers is a 2007 Chinese television series starring Peter Ho and Dong Jie.
- Journey to the West is a 1996 Hong Kong television series that features the tale in which Liang Shanbo (played by Wayne Lai) was just one of the many heaven-mandated reincarnations of Marshal Tianpeng who later became Zhu Bajie.
- Romeo and His Butterfly Lover 羅密歐與祝英台 is a 2023 Hong Kong television series released by TVB starring Moses Chan, Aimee Chan, Kalok Chow and Kayan Yau with elements from Romeo and Juliet and the Chinese tale

=== Music ===
The story also inspired the production of Butterfly Lovers' Violin Concerto, or Liang Zhu Violin Concerto as known in Chinese, a work for violin and orchestra. It was composed by He Zhanhao and Chen Gang in 1958. The piece has been the most musically symbolic retelling of the legend; at 25 minutes and 40 seconds long, it has now become a classic piece of Chinese music. During the 1970s, Hong Kong television station TVB adapted the legend as a musical miniseries, with Roman Tam and Susanna Kwan supplying the vocals for the soundtrack composed by Joseph Koo. The musical piece was used as the theme music for more than two films.

- Butterfly (2004) is the 15th track in the Shining Energy album by Twelve Girls Band
- Denise Ho (2005) performed in the musical Butterfly Lovers (梁祝下世傳奇) as the leading actress, producer, and musical director. Her album of the same name gave her three Number 1 singles – "Becoming a Butterfly" (化蝶), "Lawrence and Lewis" (勞斯．萊斯), and "Coffee in a Soda Bottle" (汽水樽裡的咖啡), which are all based on the story of the Butterfly Lovers, with possible homosexual themes. These singles helped her to receive the "Female Singer Silver Award" at the Ultimate Song Chart Awards Presentation 2005 (叱吒樂壇流行榜頒獎典禮).
- Liang Shanbo Yu Zhuliye (梁山伯與茱麗葉; Liang Shanbo and Juliet) (2006) is a duet performed by Gary Cao and Genie Chuo. It was listed as the 1st track in the Xi Guan (習慣) album by Genie Chuo.
- Shuang Fei (雙飛) is a song associated with the story. It was used as one of the theme songs for The Lovers (1994) and the ending theme song for Butterfly Lovers (2007). It was performed by Nicky Wu in 1994 and Peter Ho in 2007.
- In May 2018, on her first full studio album in nine years, called Butterflies, Basia released "Liang and Zhu." The song was noted as “a deeply felt, simply gorgeous ballad, which refers to the Chinese folk-legend of the two lovers named in the title.

== References and further reading ==
- Chen, Rachel (2010). "Four Chinese Legends". A recent narration along with three other legends. ASIN B083QPHX7H
- "'Butterfly Lovers' to bid for Intangible World Heritage" (15 June 2004) Xinhuanet.
- "China to seek world heritage listing of 'butterfly lovers' story" (14 June 2004) Newsgd.com (member of Nanfang Daily Group).
- Idema, Wilt L. (2012). "Old Tales for New Times: Some Comments on the Cultural Translation of China's Four Great Folktales in the Twentieth Century 二十世紀中國四大民間故事的文化翻譯" (PDF). Taiwan Journal of East Asian Studies. 9 (1): 25–46. Archived from the original (PDF) on 6 October 2014.
- Mao, Xian (2013). Cowherd and Weaver and other most popular love legends in China. eBook: Kindle Direct Publishing.
