= Chin Han (actor, born 1938) =

Hong Kong actor, director, screenwriter and producer

- Born: Pi Jen-hsu (畢仁序); 4 December 1938 (age 87); Weihai, Shandong, China
- Other names: King Han; Kam Hon; Kien Han; Ronald Bi
- Occupations: Actor; director; writer; producer
- Years active: 1963–1983
- Spouse: Ivy Ling Po (m. 1966)
- Children: Kenneth Bi (born 1967); Daniel Bi (born 1974)

Chinese name
- Traditional Chinese: 金漢
- Simplified Chinese: 金汉
Transcriptions
Standard Mandarin
- Hanyu Pinyin: Jīn Hàn

Ronald Bi Jen-hsu (born 4 December 1938), known by his stage name Chin Han, is a retired Hong Kong actor, director, screenwriter and producer born in mainland China. He has appeared in over 50 Mandarin-language films in Hong Kong and Taiwan, many of them produced by the Shaw Brothers Studio in the 1960s and the 1970s.

== Personal life ==
Born in Weihai, Republic of China, Pi Jen-hsu moved to Hong Kong as a small child during the Japanese occupation of Hong Kong. After finishing from New Method College, his first career was in a hong. In 1961, he entered Shaw Brothers Studio, working as a script supervisor for director Yueh Feng. In 1964, he rose to fame when Yueh Feng cast him in a major Huangmei opera film Lady General Hua Mu-lan, opposite superstar Ivy Ling Po.

In 1966, Chin Han married Ivy Ling Po. They moved to Taiwan in 1973 where they continued to work in the film industry until immigrating to Canada in the late 1980s. After retirement, they made guest appearances in their son Kenneth Bi's directorial debut Rice Rhapsody (2004).

== Filmography ==
=== Film ===
As actor

Year	Title	Role	Notes
1963	Revenge of a Swordswoman (原野奇俠傳)	Han Dahai	
1963	The Love Eterne (梁山伯與祝英台)		extra, opera film
1964	Between Tears and Smiles (故都春夢)	street stunt performer	extra
1964	Lady General Hua Mu-lan (花木蘭)	Li Guang	opera film
1964	The Female Prince (雙鳳奇緣)	Li Rulong	opera film
1964	The Warlord and the Actress (血濺牡丹紅)	Lin Keqiang	
1965	Sons of Good Earth (大地兒女)	university student	extra
1965	Hong Kong, Manila, Singapore (心花朵朵開)	Lawyer Fan	
1966	The Blue and the Black (藍與黑)	Ho Meng	2-part film series
1966	The Joy of Spring (歡樂青春)	Tu Shao-hua	
1967	The Dragon Creek (龍虎溝)	Guo Jianming	
1967	The Midnight Murder (三更寃)	Wang Zhengtu	opera film
1967	My Dream Boat (船)	Chi Yuan	
1967	Song of Tomorrow (明日之歌)	Yu Ming	
1968	Summer Heat (狂戀詩)	Chu Ta-wei	
1969	Diary of a Lady-Killer (獵人)	Chou Kuo-hsiung	
1969	River of Tears (相思河畔)	Feng Chi-wei	
1970	Brothers Five (五虎屠龍)	Gao Hao	
1970	The Heroic Ones (十三太保)	Li Siyuan	
1970	Guess Who Killed My Twelve Lovers? (噴火美人魚)	Chen Ta-kang	
1971	Long Road to Freedom (五枝紅杏)	Lin Chung	
1971	The Swift Knight (來如風)	Liu Xuanping	
1971	Sons and Daughters (千萬人家)		
1971	Duel for Gold (火併)	Meng Long	
1972	The Killer (大殺手)	Ma Yi	
1972	The Champion of Champions (大地龍蛇)	Jiang Hanyun	
1972	Finger of Doom (太陰指)	Lu Tianbao	
1972	Trilogy of Swordsmanship (群英會)	Li Jingrang	Segment 2: "The Tigress" (胭脂虎)
1973	The Champion (豪客)	Lu Fu	
1973	Woman of the Night (夜生活的女人)	Su Po-hsuan	Segment 1 (anthology film)
1973	The Boxers (虎豹兄弟)		
1974	Crazy Nuts of Kung Fu (鬼馬兩金剛)		
1974	Thirteen (早熟)	Lu Tao-jan	
1974	The Two Faces of Love (小孩與狗)		
1974	Sergeant Hsiung (大摩天嶺)	Hsiung Chi-lao	
1974	Green Green Meadow (青青草原上)	Fang Chen-huai	
1975	Eight Hundred Heroes (八百壯士)	Shangkuan Chih-piao	
1975	The Chinese Amazons (女兵日記)		
1976	Crossroad (十字路口)	Ho Wen-chang	also director, writer, producer
1976	April Melody (四月的旋律)		
1976	The Last Battle of Yang Chao (大忠烈)	Shi Kefa	
1977	The Prominent Eunuch Chen Ho (鄭和下西洋)	Zhu Di	
1977	Heroes of the Eastern Skies (筧橋英烈傳)	Liu Cuigang	
1979	The Battle of Ku-ning-tou (古寧頭大戰)	Hu Lien	
1980	Magnificent 72 (碧血黃花)	Huang Keqiang	
1981	A Sword Named Revenge (名劍風流)	Ji Wuqing	
1981	Heroes from the Sky (天降神兵)		guest star
1981	The Thrilling Sword (神劍動山河)	King Gaoxing	
1981	The Coldest Winter in Peking (皇天后土)	Commander Qiu	guest star
1983	The Longest Night (最長的一夜)	army commander	guest star
1983	The Lost Generation (風水二十年)	casino debt collector	guest star
1987	Master Hui Neng (六祖慧能傳)	Emperor Wu of Liang	guest star
2004	Rice Rhapsody (海南鸡饭)	Bill's grandpa	guest star

As director

- 1965: Three Beautiful Blind Female Spies (艷諜三盲女)
- 1966: Three Beautiful Blind Female Spies 2 (盲女地下司令)
- 1966: Three Beautiful Blind Female Spies 3 (盲女大逃亡)
- 1966: The In-law Marriage (親姆娶親家)
- 1967: The Other Day's Typhoon (颱風雨彼日)
- 1976: Crossroad (十字路口) – also actor, writer and producer
- 1978: Dream of the Red Chamber (新紅樓夢) – also writer (opera film)
- 1980: The Imperious Princess (金枝玉葉) – also co-producer (opera film)

As writer

- 1967: The Three Desperate Drunks (賭命三醉客)
- 1976: Crossroad (十字路口) – also actor, director and producer
- 1978: Dream of the Red Chamber (新紅樓夢) – also writer (opera film)

As producer

- 1976: Crossroad (十字路口) – also actor, director and writer
- 1980: The Imperious Princess (金枝玉葉) – also director (opera film)

=== Television series ===
Year	Title	Role	Notes
1981	Our Land, Our People (吾土吾民)	Zuo Baogui	
1986	The Legend of Imperial Consort Yang (楊貴妃傳奇)	Li Longji	
