= Tsin Ting =

Taiwanese singer and dubbing artist (1934–2022)

Jing Ting (Chinese: 静婷; pinyin: Jìng Tíng; 1934 – 20 October 2022) was a Chinese singer and dubbing artist, sometimes known as the Marni Nixon of Hong Kong cinema.

== Biography ==
Tsin Ting was born in Sichuan, China. She arrived in Hong Kong in 1949 with her brother after China came under communist rule. Left to fend for herself after her brother left for Taiwan, she sang in nightclubs to earn some money. In 1953, she recorded a Cantonese song, "One Day When We Were Young", on one side of a 78 but refused to do the other after finding her command of the language not up to par.

In 1954, she auditioned for EMI Pathé when they were recruiting new talent but was told by composer Yao Min who auditioned her that her vocals lacked power and energy. She was offered instead, a part in the chorus. In 1956, she was signed on as a solo artist after Miriam Wang, the chief executive, took notice of her. Her first record was two songs from the Shaw & Sons film Narcissus, where she dubbed for actress Shih Ying. Her self-taught ability to read music was an added bonus as this saved valuable studio time. Film studios soon began using her to dub their musical films.

During a recording session, director Li Han-hsiang (Li Hanxiang) heard her singing at the studio, dubbing a song for actress Yu Suqiu in the Shaw movie Lady in Distress (1957). Impressed with her voice, he had her dub for film star Lin Dai in his next film Diau Charn. The film was a great success all over Southeast Asia and won several Asian Film Festival awards. Thereafter, when Li went on to film The Kingdom and the Beauty, Tsin Ting was roped in to dub for Lin Dai once again.

Tsin Ting dubbed many of Shaw Brothers' Huangmei Opera movies from the 1950s to the 1960s. The most notable was The Love Eterne (1963), where she sang for lead actress Betty Loh Ti (Lè Dì 樂蒂) in the role of Zhu Yingtai. The pathos and emotional impact of her singing, along with Loh Ti's excellent acting, moved viewers to tears. She left Shaw Studio as a contract singer in 1970 but continued recording albums on EMI in the 1970s, Wing Hung in the 1980s, and Polygram in the 1990s.

In 2000, Tsin Ting made a remarkable career resurgence with soldout concerts at the Hong Kong Coliseum with Liu Yun, Tsui Ping and Wu Yingyin; she repeated the feat two years later with Liu, Wu and Billie Tam. In 2006, she was the guest singer at a Donald Cheung concert singing a famous Bai Guang classic and then duetting with Donald. This is available on DVD.

Tsin Ting died on 20 October 2022, at the age of 88.

== Selected filmography ==
Shaw Brothers (Hong Kong) Limited

Huangmei Opera Movies

- Diau Charn – 1958
- The Kingdom and the Beauty – 1959
- Return of the Phoenix -1962
- The Story of Sue San – 1962
- The Adulteress – 1962
- The Love Eterne – 1963
- Three Sinners – 1962
- The Amorous Lotus Pan – 1963
- The Comedy of Mismatches – 1963
- The Female Prince – 1963
- The Butterfly Chalice – 1963
- A Maid From Heaven – 1963
- The Lotus Lamp – 1963
- Beyond the Great Wall – 1964
- The Mermaid – 1964
- The West Chamber – 1964
- The Midnight Murder -1964
- The Perfumed Arrow – 1966
- The Pearl Phoenix – 1967
- Forever and Ever – 1968
- The Mirror and the Lichee – 1968
- The Three Smiles – 1969

Contemporary Movies

- The Magic Touch
- The Shepherd Girl
- Till the End of Time
- Song of Tomorrow
- Pink Tears
- 4 Sisters
- Poison Rose
- Swan Song
- Angel With the Iron Fists
- Hong Kong Nocturne
- Hong Kong Rhapsody
- The Dancing Millionairess
- Songfest
- My Dreamboat
- Moonlight Serenade
- Susanna
- The Warlord and the Actress
- The Millionaire Chase
- The Blue & Black
