= Song of Tomorrow =

Song of Tomorrow may refer to:

- Song of Tomorrow (1967 film), a Hong Kong film directed by Doe Ching
- Song of Tomorrow (2010 film), a Swedish film directed by Jonas Bergergård and Jonas Holmström

== See also ==
- A Song for Tomorrow, a 1948 British film
