= The Mermaid (1965 film) =

1965 Hong Kong film by Kao Li

- film poster
- Traditional Chinese: 魚美人
- Simplified Chinese: 鱼美人
- Literal meaning: Fish Beauty
- Hanyu Pinyin: Yú Měirén
- Directed by: Kao Li
- Written by: Chang Cheh
- Produced by: Runme Shaw
- Starring: Ivy Ling Po; Li Ching; Ching Miao; Chiang Kuang-chao; Ouyang Sha-fei; Yang Chih-ching; Tang Ti
- Cinematography: Tong Hsiao-yung
- Edited by: Chiang Hsing-long
- Music by: Wang Foo-ling
- Production company: Shaw Brothers Studio
- Release date: January 29, 1965
- Running time: 95 minutes
- Country: Hong Kong
- Language: Mandarin

The Mermaid is a 1965 Hong Kong Huangmei opera film. It was directed by Kao Li and produced by Shaw Brothers Studio, based on Yulan Ji.

Like most Huangmei opera films that she starred in, actress Ivy Ling Po portrayed a male character. Her co-star Li Ching portrayed two different characters, a human girl and a carp who transformed into her image.

== Synopsis ==
Zhang Zhen's family had fallen on hard times but remembering the betrothal agreement between his father and the prime minister, Master Chin, he set off for his fiance's home. When he arrived, he was distressed to receive a cold reception from his future father-in-law, who looked down on him because he was poor and was willing to fulfill his promise only after Zhang Zhen had successfully become the top scholar. He bade Zhang Zhen to stay at the Green Waves Study and prepare.

After a year, Zhang Zhen still had not achieved the status of top scholar. His pampered and spoiled betrothed, Peony, after the initial introduction had already forgotten about him. All he had for a companion, were the carp and the denizens of the pond by the study. The carp spirit was touched by his care for the fish and his loneliness. She visited him one winter's night in the guise of Peony and was further impressed with his sensitive and gentlemanly considerations for her well being. She managed to persuade him that she was of like mind with his philosophies, acknowledging their betrothal and her support in his endeavors. Thus a relationship was formed.

One night in spring, during the lantern festival, Zhang Zhen mistook the real Peony for his beloved and was rebuffed. Her father promptly threw him out. Shocked by his beloved's turn-about, enraged by the betrayal, disgusted with the materialistic and sanctimonious unprincipled attitudes of both father and daughter, he stormed off to return home. The carp spirit went after him and convinced him of her sincerity, telling him too that she was with child. Both decided to return to Zhang Zhen's home, 300 miles away. They attended the lantern festivities along their journey and were seen by Peony's father who thought Zhang Zhen had committed the worst of sins.

When two Peonies appeared, the household was thrown into an uproar. Even the righteous Judge Pao could not come to a settlement. Finally, the father summoned an exorcist to chase away the evil spirit. The carp spirit hastily released Zhang Zhen from the shed where he was imprisoned and convinced him to run away with her. However, they were beset by the Celestial Generals and gods who were summoned to subdue her. In despair, she told Zhang Zhen the truth and was gratified when he vowed to stay by her. Just as she was about to be killed, the Goddess of Mercy intervened. The carp spirit was given two choices, return with the Goddess to continue her training to be an immortal or forsake all her powers and become human.

== Cast and characters ==
=== Mortals ===
- Ivy Ling Po as Zhang Zhen
- Li Ching as Jin Mudan
- Yang Chih-ching as Jin Chong
- Ouyang Sha-fei as Jin Chong's wife
- Yip Ching as Chunlan
- Yam Ho as Jincai
- Ching Miao as Bao Zheng
- Fung Ngai as Wang Chao
- Lan Wei-lieh as Ma Han
- Kwan Yan as Zhang Long
- Leung Yui as Zhao Hu

=== Mythical Characters ===
- Li Ching as Carp Spirit
- Chiang Kuang-chao as Turtle Spirit
- Tang Ti as Crab Spirit
- Han Ying-chieh as Prawn Spirit
- Shirley Wong as Snail Spirit
- Chen Yun-hua as Goddess of Mercy

== Original soundtrack ==
The singing was performed by Ivy Ling Po, Tsin Ting and Liu Yun.

== Awards and nominations ==
12th Asian Film Festival (1965)

- Best Actress: Li Ching
- The Most Versatile Talent Award: Ivy Ling Po
- Best Sound Recording: Wang Yung-hua
