= Five Roads Gods (Investiture of the Gods) =

Group of characters in Fengshen Yanyi

The Five Roads Gods (Chinese: 五路神; pinyin: Wǔlù Shén), also called the Five Ghosts (Chinese: 五鬼; pinyin: Wǔ Guǐ), are five spirits in the Chinese novel Fengshen Yanyi. They are defeated by Jiang Ziya and later help build the Investiture Terrace.

== Role in the novel ==
The five spirits cause trouble in the garden of Song Yiren (宋異人) in Chaoge. They repeatedly burn down a building under construction. Jiang Ziya encounters them and uses his magic to defeat them. The spirits have red, white, black, green, and yellow faces. They beg for mercy and say they have practiced magic for many years. Jiang Ziya spares them and orders them to go to Xiqi Mountain to await his orders.

The spirits later meet Jiang Ziya at Xiqi Mountain, where they are called the Five Roads Gods (五路神). Jiang Ziya orders them to help Bai Jian build the Investiture Terrace (封神台).

== Folk religion ==
The name Five Roads Gods (五路神) is also used in Chinese folk religion. They are known as Lutou (路头), or Road Gods, and are worshipped for wealth and good fortune. The five roads are the east, west, south, north, and center. They are traditionally worshipped on the fifth day of the first lunar month.

Another group called the Five Roads Gods of Wealth (五路財神) consists of Zhao Gongming, Xiao Sheng, Cao Bao, Chen Jiugong, and Yao Shaosi.

The Quhai zongmu tiyao (曲海總目提要) also records the worship of the Five Roads Gods as Lutou and Gods of Wealth. Their worship was especially common in Jiangsu and Zhejiang. The work also mentions the Wutong Gods (五通神).

== Origins ==
Chang Ming suggests that the five spirits in Fengshen Yanyi may have come from an older story about the Five Directional Gods (五方之神). In that story, Jiang Ziya gives duties to five gods who visit King Wu's army. Chang also compares the spirits with the Wutong Gods (五通神), who appear in Chinese folk tales.
