= Thirteen (1974 film) =

1974 Hong Kong film by Sung Tsun-shou

- film poster
- Chinese: 早熟
- Literal meaning: Premature
- Hanyu Pinyin: Zǎoshú
- Jyutping: Zou2 Suk6
- Directed by: Sung Tsun-shou
- Written by: Sung Tsun-shou
- Based on: Kuo Liang-hui's Zao Shu
- Produced by: Runme Shaw
- Starring: Tien Niu; Ling Yun; Chin Han; Wong Yue
- Cinematography: Ho Luk-Ying
- Edited by: Chiang Hsing-lung
- Music by: Wang Fu-ling
- Production company: Shaw Brothers Studio
- Release date: 19 March 1974
- Country: Hong Kong
- Language: Mandarin

Thirteen is a 1974 Hong Kong coming-of-age film directed by Sung Tsun-shou and produced by Shaw Brothers Studio. It was based on the novel Zaoshu ("matured early") by Taiwanese novelist Kuo Liang-hui.

== Cast and characters ==
- Chin Han as Lu Tao-jan, a newspaper publisher.
- Hsia Ping as Lan Chin, Lu's wife. The marriage is unhappy, and she spends most of her time playing mahjong. She treats her daughters rudely, but spoils her son.
- Ku Chiu-chin as Lu Yun-pai, Lu Tao-jan's oldest daughter. She is married, pregnant and hardworking.
- Chen I-ling as Lu Chin-pai, Lu Tao-jan's second daughter. She spends most of her time dressing up and hanging out with her boyfriend.
- Tien Niu as Lu Chih-pai, Lu Tao-jan's third daughter and the protagonist of the film. She is 13 and does not like to study. She also does not get along with Chin-pai, with whom she shares a room.
- Yuan Man-tzu as Lu Hsiu-pai, Lu Tao-jan's fourth daughter.
- Chiang Ko-ai as Lu Li-pai, Lu Tao-jan's fifth daughter.
- Hsu Chia-lin as Lu Sheng-pai, Lu Tao-jan's son and the youngest child.
- Ling Yun as Shih Hsin-chiao, a 30-year-old journalist who trained under Lu Tao-jan.
- Huang Shu-yi as Shih Hsin-ju, Shih Hsin-chiao's cousin in Macau. Her husband is in America, living with another woman.
- Wong Yue as Hung Sen, a playboy 2 grades higher than Chih-pai.
- Wang Ching-ho as the gynecologist.

== Plot ==
Shih Hsin-chiao, a journalist who trained under mentor Lu Tao-jan, is a family friend of the Lus and well-liked by the children. Lu's 13-year-old daughter Chih-pai is infatuated with "Uncle Shih", but Shih sees her only as a child. Lu Tao-jan is transferred to Macau, where he has an affair with Shih's cousin. When Shih returns after a trip to Japan, he finds Chih-pai an attractive young woman. After repeatedly being rejected by Shih, Chih-pai has a relationship with a rich playboy Hung Sen, which leaves her pregnant. Desperate, she goes to the only man who can help her: Shih.
