= Tang Jing =

Tang Jing may refer to:

- Tang Ching or Tang Jing (唐菁; born 1924), Chinese/Taiwanese actor, winner of Golden Horse Award for Best Actor
- Tang Jing (footballer) (唐京; born 1975), Chinese professional footballer
- Tang Jing (judoka) (唐婧; born 1995), Chinese judoka
