= Cheating in Panorama =

1972 Hong Kong film by Li Han-hsiang

- Film poster
- Traditional Chinese: 騙術大觀
- Simplified Chinese: 骗术大观
- Hanyu Pinyin: Piàn Shù Dà Guān
- Jyutping: Pin3 Seot6 Daai6 Gun1
- Directed by: Li Han-hsiang
- Written by: Li Han-hsiang
- Produced by: Chang Tsui-Ying
- Starring: Chen Chen; Li Han-hsiang; Alan Tang; Zhao Lei; Zhang Yang
- Production company: Grand Motion Picture Company
- Distributed by: One Heart Company
- Release date: 11 February 1972 (Hong Kong)
- Running time: 100 minutes
- Country: Hong Kong
- Language: Mandarin

Cheating in Panorama (simplified Chinese: 骗术大观; traditional Chinese: 騙術大觀; pinyin: Piàn Shù Dà Guān) is a 1972 Hong Kong comedy film directed by Li Han-hsiang.

The film has a theme of duplicity. Film critic Ain-ling Wong classified Cheating in Panorama as having what Chan Koonchung would describe as "slovenly aesthetics" that is of "the crude and vulgar variety".

== Cast ==
- Chen Chen
- Li Han-hsiang
- Alan Tang
- Zhao Lei
- Zhang Yang
- Lee Kwan
- Charlie Chin
- Chiang Nan
- Roy Chiao Hung
- Jenny Hu
