= Heart Lock =

1962 novel by Gloria Liang-Hui Kuo

Heart Lock is Taiwanese writer Gloria Liang-Hui Kuo’s work. It was initially serialized in the Human Realm supplement of Credit Investigation Newspaper in 1962 and later published by Da Ye Bookstore in September of the same year. The intricacies of romantic entanglements between men and women, as well as the incestuous relations among relatives inside the plot, garnered criticism from female writers. Consequently, the work faced a ban until its reemergence in 1986, when it was reintroduced as a film adaptation under the same title. This controversy also led to Kuo’s banishment from two renowned literary associations at that time.

This work depicts the protagonist, Hsia Tanchi, engaging in intercourse with men other than her husband, including her ex-boyfriend and her brother-in-law, as well as her inner struggle. As a result, female writers at the time such as Su Hsueh-lin (蘇雪林) and Xie Bing-ying (謝冰瑩) denounced the work with disparaging remarks like "moral corruption," "incest," etc. This sparked a controversy that eventually led to the banning of the work. The literary community also engaged in spirited debates regarding the assessment of this piece.

With the lifting of the ban on this work in 1986 and the rise of women's literature research in Taiwan, researchers reassessed the work from the perspective of female liberty and the social context of the 1950s:

1. Chang Shu-li (張淑麗), a scholar of literature, believes that the daring depiction of sexuality in this work and the resultant controversies sparked multifaceted reflections among readers regarding literature and society, aesthetics and politics, as well as eroticism and moral norms.
2. Fan Ming-ju (范銘如), another scholar of literature, interprets this work as a probe of gender politics, as it emphasizes the querying of female subjectivity, deconstructs hegemonic discourses, and employs multiple, fragmented, and unstable female identities to highlight the arbitrariness of mainstream ideologies.
3. Ying Feng-huang (應鳳凰), also scholar of literature, seeing the work from the narrative standpoint of Taiwanese literary history, contends that this work cannot be categorized as anti-communist literature of the 1950s or as modern literature of the 1960s, which offers reflections on narrative issues in the history of Taiwanese literature.
