= 6th Golden Horse Awards =

1968 Taiwan film awards ceremony

- Date: October 30, 1968
- Site: Zhongshan Hall, Taipei, Taiwan
- Hosted by: Huang Shao-ku
- Organized by: Taipei Golden Horse Film Festival Executive Committee

Highlights
- Best Feature Film: The Road
- Best Director: Pai Ching-jui; Lonely Seventeen
- Best Actor: Tsui Fu-sheng; The Road
- Best Actress: Ivy Ling; Too Late for Love
- Most awards: Lonely Seventeen (5); Too Late for Love (5)

The 6th Golden Horse Awards (Chinese: 第6屆金馬獎) took place on October 30, 1968, at Zhongshan Hall in Taipei, Taiwan.

== Winners and nominees ==
Winners are listed first, and highlighted in boldface.

**Best Feature Film**: **The Road**; Too Late for Love (runner-up); Dragon Inn (runner-up); Darling Stay at Home (runner-up)	**Best Documentary**: **Da Zai Zhong Hua**; Ren Zhe Shou (runner-up); Youth Holiday (runner-up)
**Best News Film**: **Cinema News No. 595**; Cinema News No. 596 (runner-up)	**Best Director**: **Pai Ching-jui — Lonely Seventeen**
**Best Leading Actor**: **Tsui Fu-sheng — The Road**	**Best Leading Actress**: **Ivy Ling — Too Late for Love**
**Best Supporting Actor**: **Ching Miao — Too Late for Love**	**Best Supporting Actress**: **Ouyang Sha-fei— Too Late for Love**
**Best Child Star**: **Chia Chia — Tender Tears**	**Best Screenplay**: **King Hu — Dragon Inn**
**Best Cinematography - Color**: **Lin Tsan-ting — Lonely Seventeen**	**Best Cinematography - Black-and-White**: **Yu Ju-chi — The Heron Garden**
**Best Film Editing**: **Shen Yeh-kang — Lonely Seventeen**	**Best Art Direction**: **Lee Chi — Lonely Seventeen**
**Best Music**: **Wang Fu-ling — Too Late for Love**	**Best Cinematography for Documentary**: **Lee Hsin-yi et al. — Da Zai Zhong Hua**
**Best Planning for Documentary**: **Wang Bo-ying — Da Zai Zhong Hua**	**Best Cinematography for News Film**: **Wu Kuang-chang — Cinema News No. 595**
**Best Writing and Directing for News Film**: **Lee Leng — Cinema News No. 595**	**Special Award of Social Education**: **Call of the Mountains**
**Special Award - Outstanding Cinematography**: **Lonely Seventeen**	**Special Award - Outstanding War Report**: **Vietnam War Report**
