= The Admired Girl =

1972 Hong Kong film by Li Han-hsiang

- Film poster
- Directed by: Li Han-hsiang
- Written by: Li Han-hsiang
- Produced by: Cheng Lun; Yeh Yin-Han
- Starring: Patrick Tse Yin; Chen Chen; Lee Kwan; Han Chiang
- Cinematography: Chen Jung-Shu; Ho Lu-Ying
- Music by: Wu Ta Chiang
- Production company: Tung Wo Motion Picture Investment Company
- Release date: 14 April 1972 (Hong Kong)
- Country: Hong Kong
- Language: Mandarin

The Admired Girl (pinyin: Zhi xian yuan yang bu xian xian) is a 1972 Hong Kong film written and directed by Li Han Hsiang, and starring Patrick Tse Yin, Chen Chen, Lee Kwan and Han Chiang.

== Cast ==
- Patrick Tse Yin
- Chen Chen
- Lee Kwan
- Han Chiang
