= Finger of Doom =

1972 Hong Kong film by Pao Hsueh-li

Finger Of Doom
- 太陰指
- Directed by: Pao Hsueh-li
- Written by: Yau Kong-kin
- Starring: Chin Han; Ivy Ling
- Production company: Shaw Brothers Studio
- Release date: 1972
- Country: Hong Kong
- Language: Mandarin

Finger Of Doom (太陰指) is a 1972 Hong Kong wuxia film directed by Pao Hsueh-li, starring Chin Han and Ivy Ling.
