= Wang Yumin =

People named Wang Yumin may refer to:

- Wang Yu-min (王育敏; born 1971), Taiwanese politician who was elected National-at-large member from 2024
- Zhao Lei (趙雷; 1928–1996), Chinese actor, born Wang Yumin (王育民)
