= Diau Charn (film) =

1958 Hong Kong film by Li Han-hsiang

- A still from film featuring Lin Dai as Diaochan.

Chinese name
- Traditional Chinese: 貂蟬
- Simplified Chinese: 貂蝉
Transcriptions
Standard Mandarin
- Hanyu Pinyin: Diāo Chán
- Directed by: Li Han-hsiang
- Written by: Kao Li
- Produced by: Runde Shaw
- Starring: Lin Dai; Chao Lei
- Cinematography: Yang Jun
- Edited by: Chiang Hsing-Lung
- Music by: Wang Shun
- Production company: Shaw Brothers Studio
- Release date: 1958
- Running time: 88 minutes
- Country: Hong Kong
- Language: Mandarin

Diau Charn is a 1958 Hong Kong Huangmei opera film directed by Li Han-hsiang. The film is based on the 14th century novel Romance of the Three Kingdoms, and stars Lin Dai as Diaochan (Diau Charn).

== Cast ==
- Lin Dai as Diaochan
  - Tsin Ting as Diaochan (singing)
- Chao Lei as Lü Bu
- Lo Wei as Dong Zhuo
- Yang Chih-ching as Wang Yun
- Li Yun-chung as Li Ru
- Lo Hsiung as Zhang Wen
