= The Enchanting Shadow =

1960 Hong Kong film by Li Han-hsiang

- Film poster
- Simplified Chinese: 倩女幽魂
- Literal meaning: beautiful ghost woman
- Hanyu Pinyin: qiàn yǚ yōuhún
- Directed by: Li Han-hsiang
- Written by: Pu Songling; Wang Yueting
- Produced by: Run Run Shaw; Zhou Duwen
- Starring: Betty Loh Ti; Zhao Lei
- Cinematography: He Luying
- Edited by: Chiang Hsing-lung
- Music by: Yao Min; Chi Hsiang-tang
- Distributed by: Shaw Brothers Studio
- Release date: 17 August 1960
- Running time: 83 minutes
- Country: Hong Kong
- Languages: Mandarin; Cantonese

The Enchanting Shadow (Chinese: 倩女幽魂, Sin neui yau wan, Chi’en-nu Yu-Hin, Qiàn yǚ Yōuhún) is a 1960 Hong Kong drama film directed by Li Han-hsiang. It was entered into the 1960 Cannes Film Festival. The film was also selected as the Hong Kong entry for the Best Foreign Language Film at the 33rd Academy Awards, but was not accepted as a nominee. The film was an inspiration for the 1987 film A Chinese Ghost Story.

== Plot ==
At the end of Ming Dynasty and the beginning of Qing Dynasty, the country was in ruins and the society was in turmoil. The scholar Ning Caichen went to collect rent and stayed overnight at Jinhua Temple, where he met the swordsman Yan Chixia. The female ghost Nie Xiaoqian was forced by the old demon grandmother to take Ning Caichen's life for the grandmother to suck blood. In the face of beauty and gold, Ning Caichen was unmoved. Nie Xiaoqian was kind by nature, so she told him the truth and let him live with Yan Chixia, thus escaping the disaster. Nie Xiaoqian was originally a daughter of an official, and died in a foreign land. Ning Caichen took her ashes back home. On the way, the grandmother attacked, and Ning Caichen's life was in danger. Yan Chixia arrived and subdued the old demon.

== Cast ==
- Betty Loh Ti as Nie Xiaoqian
- Zhao Lei as Ning Caichen
- Yang Chih-ching (Yang Zhiqing) as Yan Chixia
- Tang Ruoqing as Lao Lao
- Lee Kwan as Scholar's servant

== See also ==
- List of submissions to the 33rd Academy Awards for Best Foreign Language Film
- List of Hong Kong submissions for the Academy Award for Best Foreign Language Film
