= Duel for Gold =

1971 Hong Kong film by Chor Yuen

- Duel for Gold DVD cover art
- 火併
- Directed by: Chor Yuen
- Written by: Ni Kuang
- Produced by: Runme Shaw
- Starring: Chin Han; Ivy Ling; Lieh Lo; Wang Ping
- Cinematography: Cho-Hua Wu
- Edited by: Hsing-Lung Chiang
- Production company: Shaw Brothers Studio
- Distributed by: Shaw Brothers
- Release date: 11 June 1971 (Hong Kong)
- Running time: 100 minutes
- Country: Hong Kong
- Language: Mandarin

Duel for Gold (火併) is a 1971 Hong Kong wuxia film directed by Chor Yuen, written by Ni Kuang, and produced by the Shaw Brothers Studio, starring Ivy Ling, Lo Lieh, Chin Han, Wang Ping, Tsung Hua, and Chen Chun.

== Synopsis ==
A huge sum of gold stored in a qianzhuang in Datong Prefecture has become the target of various robbers. Teng Qiying, a lone brigand, has invited Wen Lixian, a security guard at the qianzhuang, to join him in his plan to steal the gold. After Wen refuses, Teng reaches out to the sisters Yuyan and Yuying and their husbands. They betray and outwit each other during the heist.

== Cast ==
- Ivy Ling as Yuyan (Meng Niangzi)
- Wang Ping as Yuying (Hua Niangzi)
- Chin Han as Meng Long
- Chung Hua as Hua Die'er
- Lo Lieh as Teng Qiying
- Chan Chun as Wen Lixian (Wen Sanhu)

== Release ==
The film's original Chinese title was Huo Bing (火併), and the working English title was Thieves Fall Out. After its release, the film became known worldwide under its English title Duel for Gold.

== Reception ==
On IMDb, the film has gotten an average rating of 6.9 stars out of 10; the majority of the reviews being either 7 stars or 8 stars.
