= Love with an Alien =

1958 Hong Kong-South Korean film by Jeon Chang-geun, Tu Gwang-qi and Mitsuo Wakasugi

- Theatrical release poster
- Traditional Chinese: 異國情鴛
- Simplified Chinese: 异国情鸳
- Literal meaning: Exotic Lovebirds
- Hanyu Pinyin: yìguó qíngyuān
- Directed by: Jeon Chang-geun; Tu Gwang-qi; Mitsuo Wakasugi
- Screenplay by: Cheng Kang; Huang Chen-chi; Kim Seok-min
- Story by: Yu Du-yeon
- Produced by: Runde Shaw; Lim Hwa-su
- Starring: Lucilla Yu Ming; Kim Jin-kyu
- Cinematography: Nishimoto Tadashi; Yang Jun
- Edited by: Chiang Hsing-lung
- Music by: Hwang Mun-pyeong; Li Hao-hsiang
- Production companies: Shaw Brothers Studio; Korea Entertainment
- Release dates: 15 February 1958 (South Korea); 6 March 1958 (Hong Kong)
- Running time: 100 minutes
- Countries: Hong Kong; South Korea
- Language: Chinese

Love with an Alien (Chinese: 異國情鴛; pinyin: yìguó qíngyuān; lit. 'Exotic Lovebirds', known in South Korea as Korean: 이국정원; RR: Igukjeongwon; lit. 'Exotic Garden') is a 1958 romance film produced by Shaw Brothers Studio and Korea Entertainment as the first co-production film between South Korea and Hong Kong. Love with an Alien follows a romance between a Hong Kong singer and a visiting Korean composer, and the complications their nationalities pose for their relationship. The film is notable for being the first color film from Shaw Brothers as well as being the first in the line of South Korea-Hong Kong co-productions and influencing other romance films of the era. The film was lost for 54 years after its release before being rediscovered and restored, though the restoration has never been widely released.

== Synopsis ==
In 1950s Hong Kong, singer Bang-eum falls in love with composer Su-pyeong who is visiting from South Korea. Bang-eum’s parents become infuriated, seemingly because Su-pyeong is a foreigner. However, as the two plan to leave Hong Kong, Bang-eum's mother Bing-shim reveals that she had been married to a Korean man and had two children in Korea, a boy and a girl, Bang-Eum. She took Bang-eum to Hong Kong and never returned and having lost contact with her husband and son fears Su-pyeong may be Bang-eum's long lost brother.

== Cast ==
- Lucilla Yu Ming as Bang-eum
- Kim Jin-kyu as Su-pyeong
- Choi Moo-ryong

== Production ==
The South Korean-Hong Kong film collaboration began in 1955 at the 2nd Southeast Asia Film Festival in Singapore. Korean film producer Im Hwa-su (CEO of Hanhkook Entertainment Company, also sometimes called Korea Entertainment) met the Shaw brothers, still of Shaw & Sons at the time. The brothers suggested collaborating, with Love with an Alien the first resulting film.

The film was shot in Eastmancolor under direction of Japanese cinematographer Nishimoto Tadashi. Nishimoto was referred to the Shaw Brothers for his expertise with color film technologies, and Love with an Alien was the first color film from Shaw Brothers.

== Impact ==
Love with an Alien was released in Korea, Hong Kong and Southeast Asia in 1958. It initially met a lukewarm reception but inspired other romance films involving "hopeless love" between a Hong Kong woman and a Korean man such as Deep in My Heart and Loving the Years of War, both from 1967.

The co-production relationship between Hong Kong and South Korea continued later in the 1960s, due to collaboration between Korean director Shin Sang-ok and Shaw Brothers. This resulted in films including Last Woman of Shang (1964), The Goddess of Mercy (1966) and King with My Face (1967).

== Restoration ==
The film was lost after its premiere until a badly damaged negative print was discovered by the Korean Film Archive in a Shaw Brothers storage facility in May 2012, 54 years after its initial release. The restoration was handled by Imagica, and was debuted by the Korean Film Archive on April 2, 2013. Love with an Alien is the oldest surviving color feature film archived in Korea.

As the audio for the film was lost, in 2013 a 'dubbing show' performance based on the film was presented in Incheon, South Korea with voice work by actors including Park Si-won, Lee Soo-an and Seo Hyun-woo accompanied by live foley effects.
