= Nishimoto Tadashi =

Japanese cinematographer (1921-1997)

- 西本正
- Born: 1921; Chikushino, Fukuoka, Japan
- Died: 1997 (aged 75–76); Hong Kong
- Occupations: Cinematographer; production company founder; television producer
- Years active: 1941–1975
- Awards: See below

Japanese name
- Kanji: 西本正
- Romanization: Nishimoto Tadashi

Nishimoto Tadashi (西本 正, Nishimoto Tadashi) (1921–1997), also known as He Lanshan (Chinese: 賀蘭山; pinyin: Hèlán Shān), was a Japanese cinematographer best known for his work in Hong Kong on films by the Shaw Brothers Studio. He contributed to several Japanese films and over fifty titles in Hong Kong. Nishimoto is recognized for his work on some of the Shaw Brothers' most notable films and for his contributions to the development of film technology of Hong Kong.

== Early life ==
Nishimoto was born in Chikushino, Fukuoka in 1921. He was orphaned at a young age and lived in Manchuria with siblings and his adoptive father. In 1941, he became an apprentice cinematographer with the Manchurian Film Cooperative and was sent to Japan for further studies. He returned to Manchuria as the Second Sino-Japanese War was ending, but was not given any work and decided to return to Japan.

== Career and contributions ==
In 1948, Nishimoto joined the Shin Toho Film Company. He worked as an assistant on films such as Desertion at Dawn (1950) and Emperor Meiji and the Great Russo-Japanese War (1957), gaining experience with color film and anamorphic widescreen. In 1957, he was sent to Hong Kong to assist Shaw Brothers Studio with color film. There, he contributed his expertise to Shaw Brothers' first color production, Love with an Alien (1958), an international co-production with South Korea. After working in Hong Kong, he contributed to a few more films in Japan before returning to Hong Kong in a long-term commitment to Shaw Brothers as house cinematographer.

Nishimoto was influential at Shaw Brothers. He introduced the widescreen cameras from the Japanese TohoScope system which was developed into Shaw Scope. This technology was demonstrated in the 1963 widescreen color film Empress Wu Tse-Tien. This technological contribution along with his work introducing color modernized the Hong Kong film industry and brought it to the forefront of regional filmmaking, in line with international standards. He was often involved in several productions at the same time for the Shaw Brothers, working on some of their most prestigious productions from this time such as The Love Eterne (1963) and Come Drink with Me (1966). Nishimoto also referred Japanese filmmakers to Shaw Brothers, including Inoue Umetsugu, who directed seventeen films for the studio.

Nishimoto left Shaw Brothers in 1970 but continued to work on films including Enter the Dragon (1972) on invitation from Bruce Lee. His last film with the Shaw Brothers as director of photography was Infra-Man in 1975. This was his last year in cinematography, after having worked on over 50 Hong Kong films. Retiring from cinematography, he created the East Central Company to produce television commercials. Nishimoto died in Hong Kong in 1997.

== Selected filmography ==
=== As director of photography ===
- Love with an Alien (1958)
- Black Cat Mansion (1958)
- Ghost Story of Yotsuya (1959)
- Les Belles (1961)
- The Love Eterne (1963)
- Empress Wu Tse-Tien (1963)
- Come Drink with Me (1966)
- The Blue and the Black (1966)
- Infra-Man (1975)

=== Other contributions ===
- Desertion at Dawn (1950)
- Emperor Meiji and the Great Russo-Japanese War (1957)
- Enter the Dragon (1972)
- Games Gamblers Play (1974)

== Awards ==
Nishimoto was the cinematographer for The Magnificent Concubine (1962), which won the Grand Prix for Best Interior Photography and Color at that year's Cannes Film Festival. He also won the Best Colour Cinematography award at the Asian Film Festival for The Love Eterne (1963) and The Blue and the Black (1966). In 1977, he was presented with the Masutani Sho by the Motion Picture and Television Engineering Society of Japan for his contribution to film technology in Hong Kong.
