= Kelly Lai Chen =

Hong Kong actor

- 雷震
- Born: Yee Shun Chee (奚重儉); 3 September 1933; Shanghai, Republic of China
- Died: 3 April 2018 (aged 84); Hong Kong
- Occupation: Actor
- Years active: 1956–2000
- Spouse: Angela Mao (m. 1974; div. 1980)
- Children: Yee Pai Sy (daughter)
- Relatives: Betty Loh Ti (sister); Jayman Lau (grandson)

Chinese name
- Chinese: 雷震
Transcriptions
Standard Mandarin
- Hanyu Pinyin: Léi Zhèn

Kelly Lai Chen (Chinese: 雷震; pinyin: Léi Zhèn; Wade–Giles: Lei Chen; born Hsi Chungchien; September 3, 1933 – April 3, 2018) was a Hong Kong actor born in Shanghai. He appeared in more than 40 films in the 1950s and 1960s, and was best known for his portrayals of sensitive young men. He was the older brother of the famous actress Betty Loh Ti, and the ex-husband of the martial arts actress Angela Mao.

== Early life ==
In 1933, Lai was born as Hsi Chungchien (Chinese: 奚重儉) into a prominent family from Pudong, Shanghai, owner of the Hsi Fuchi (奚福記) Factory. He was the third child among six siblings; Betty Loh Ti (born Hsi Chung-i) was the youngest. Their maternal grandfather was the tycoon Ku Chu-hsuan, who owned Shanghai's Tianchan Theater. When Lai was four, his father was killed by Japanese bombing during the Battle of Shanghai; his mother died ten years later. He and his siblings were brought up by their maternal grandmother.

When the Communists took over Mainland China in 1949, Lai's grandmother brought the children to Hong Kong. He trained in the Republic of China Air Force cadet school in Taiwan for half a year, but was forced to quit because of the family history of heart disease.

== Career ==
After returning to Hong Kong, Lai attended the actor training school of Motion Picture & General Investment (MP&GI, later Cathay Organization of Hong Kong). In 1956, he starred in his first film Green Hills and Jade Valleys directed by Yueh Feng. In his second film, Golden Lotus, also by Yueh Feng, he acted alongside the star actress Lin Dai. The highly successful film launched Lai into stardom. In the following years, he appeared in more than 40 films, including Evan Yang's Our Dream Car (1959), Chung Kai-man (鍾啓文)'s The Education of Love (1961), and Wong Tin-lam's Father Takes a Bride (1963), starring opposite popular actresses such as Ge Lan, Jeannette Lin Cui, and Lucilla You Min. He was known for his portrayals of "gentle, vulnerable, and sensitive" young men.

In 1967, Lai, his sister Betty Loh Ti, and director Yuan Chiufeng founded the "Gold Eagle Film Company," which made a number of commercially unsuccessful martial arts films such as Duel at the Supreme Gate (1968).

Lai retired from acting in 1971 and focused on producing films. He retired in the early 1990s, but returned to the screen for Andrew Lau's 1996 film Young and Dangerous 2 and Wong Kar-wai's award-winning In the Mood for Love (2000), in which he played Maggie Cheung's boss.

== Personal life ==
In 1974, Lai married martial arts actress Angela Mao, nicknamed "female Bruce Lee". They had a daughter together, and divorced after six years of marriage. Lai raised their daughter.

In his later years, Lai lived alone in Hong Kong, and his daughter often visited him. He died on April 3, 2018, aged 84.
