= The Love Eterne =

1963 Hong Kong film by Li Han-hsiang

- Shaw Brothers film poster

Chinese name
- Traditional Chinese: 梁山伯與祝英台
- Simplified Chinese: 梁山伯与祝英台
- Literal meaning: Liang Shanbo and Zhu Yingtai
Transcriptions
Standard Mandarin
- Hanyu Pinyin: Liáng Shānbó yǔ Zhù Yīngtái
Yue: Cantonese
- Jyutping: Loeng^{4} Saan^{1}baak^{3} jyu^{5} Zuk^{1} Jing^{1}toi^{4}
- Directed by: Li Han Hsiang
- Written by: Li Han Hsiang
- Produced by: Run Run Shaw
- Starring: Betty Loh Ti; Ivy Ling Po
- Cinematography: Nishimoto Tadashi
- Edited by: Chiang Hsing-lung
- Music by: Zhou Lanping
- Distributed by: Shaw Brothers Studio
- Release date: 3 April 1963
- Running time: 122 minutes
- Country: Hong Kong
- Language: Mandarin

The Love Eterne is a 1963 Hong Kong musical film of the Huangmei opera genre directed by Li Han Hsiang. An adaptation of the Chinese legend of the Butterfly Lovers, it tells of the doomed romance between the male Liang Shanbo (portrayed by actress Ivy Ling Po, who also sang the character's vocals) and the cross-dressed female Zhu Yingtai (Betty Loh Ti, with singing dubbed by Tsin Ting).

The film won 6 awards at the 2nd Golden Horse Awards in Taiwan, including Best Picture. It was also selected as Hong Kong's entry for the Best Foreign Language Film at the 36th Academy Awards, but was not accepted as a nominee.

== Plot ==
A young 16-year-old girl, Zhu Yingtai, managed to convince her parents to send her to college at Hangzhou on the condition that she went in the guise of a man. Along her journey to the college, she met 17-year-old Liang Shanbo who was attending the same school. They became sworn "brothers" and studied for three years together. Over this period of time, they formed a strong friendship. Yingtai gradually fell in love with Shanbo who, being a bookworm, never did discover what she was despite coming across a couple of oddities. When she was summoned home by her father, Yingtai revealed the truth to her headmaster's wife. Yingtai requested that she be the matchmaker for her and Shanbo and gave her a jade pendant as a token to be handed to Shanbo.

Shanbo walked with Yingtai for 18 miles to send off his sworn brother. She tried several times to hint to him her identity during the journey but to no avail, despite insulting him twice in her exacerbation with his denseness. Finally, she found a way and got his consent to matchmake him to her "twin sister". She exhorted him to seek out his fiancee soon before they reluctantly took leave of each other at the pavilion where they first met. Upon returning to school, Shanbo was restless and could not concentrate on his studies in the absence of his sworn brother. Seeing this, the headmaster's wife told him about Yingtai, gave him the jade pendant and bade him to go propose to her.

The joy of the reunion of the two came to naught when Yingtai told Shanbo he was three months too late. Her father had already betrothed her to the frivolous son of the powerful and wealthy Ma family. Shanbo, who was already ailing, was deeply grieved. He returned home and his health steadily deteriorated. Several days before her wedding day, he asked to see her again. When his servant returned instead with a token from her, it was the final blow. He sent his servant to Yingtai with a last gift and died. Yingtai was stricken with sorrow and forced her father to come to a compromise: to allow her to visit Shanbo's tomb on the way to her betrothed's home or she would not marry. At the tomb, she swore her undying love for Shanbo and that if they could not be together in life, she would rather be with him in death. A tornado sprang up and an earthquake split the tomb in two whereupon Yingtai threw herself into it. The whipping winds covered the tomb with sand. After the winds died down, two residual pieces of cloth from Yingtai's mourning clothes transform into two butterflies, and flutter away to the heavens.

== Cast ==
- Betty Loh Ti as Zhu Yingtai
- Ivy Ling Po as Liang Shanbo
- Ren Jie as Ying Hsin
- Li Kun as Si Jiu
- Ching Miao as Old Master Zhu
- Chen Yen-yen as Madam Zhu
- Yang Chih-ching as Headmaster
- Kao Pao-shu as Headmaster's wife

=== Huangmei opera vocals ===
- Tsin Ting as Zhu Yingtai
- Ivy Ling Po as Liang Shanbo
- Kiang Hung as Old Master Zhu (Yingtai's father)

== Reception ==
The story of "Liang Shanbo yu Zhu Yingtai" is a folk legend set during the period of the Jin Dynasty. There had been various film and TV renditions but the Shaw Brothers' version, directed by Li Han Hsiang, is the only adaptation that remains popular to this day. It is considered a quintessential Huang Mei film. In particular, the song "十八相送" ("Eighteen Miles Away") was popularized by the film.

The film won enormous popularity in Taiwan, breaking records at the box office in 1963, becoming the largest grossing film at that time. The songs and lyrics left an impression on audiences in almost all of Southeast Asia. In a tour of Taiwan that year, Ivy Ling Po created a pandemonium attracting over 200,000 fans. According to the film director Ang Lee, the film "became so popular in Taiwan that some claimed to have seen it 500 times. Lines of its dialogue became part of everyday conversation ... People would take two box lunches, go the theater and watch it all day long. My parents were watching it often. I remember the third time they went to see it, there was a typhoon coming, and they still left us at home. 'O.K., we're going to see this movie, bye.' ' ... The film was popular with everyone - from children and housewives to university intellectuals."

== Second Golden Horse Awards (1963) ==
- Best Film
- Best Director: Li Han Hsiang
- Best Actress: Betty Loh Ti
- Special Award For Outstanding Performance: Ivy Ling Po
- Best Music: Zhou Lan-Ping
- Best Editing: Chiang Hsing-loong

== See also ==
- List of Shaw Brothers films
- List of submissions to the 36th Academy Awards for Best Foreign Language Film
- List of Hong Kong submissions for the Academy Award for Best Foreign Language Film
