= Xiaosheng =

Type of roles in Chinese opera

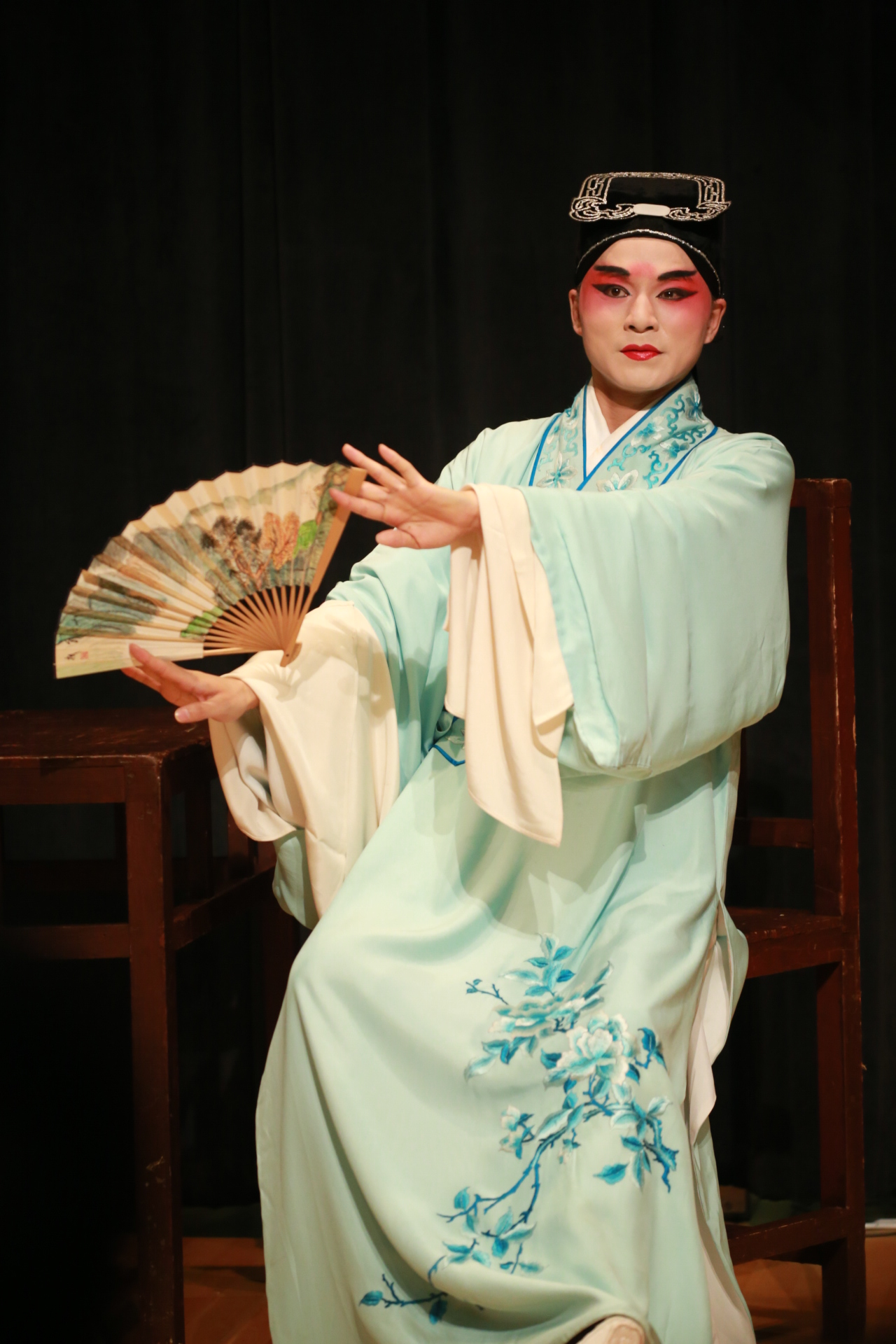
A kunqu actor portrays the young scholar Pan Bizheng by holding a hand fan with his fingers.

The xiaosheng (Chinese: 小生; pinyin: xiǎoshēng; lit. 'little (gentle)man') is a male role type in Chinese opera and a subtype of the sheng. Most xiaosheng characters are young Confucian scholars or, less often, young warriors.

Unlike laosheng actors, xiaosheng actors do not wear a beard. However, not all beardless roles are necessarily xiaosheng, for example eunuchs (huanguan) can be played by xiaosheng, chou, jing, or longtao actors (extras).

== Subtypes ==
=== Confucian scholars and officials ===
The jinsheng (巾生) or jinzisheng (巾子生; "cloth sheng"), sometimes also known as the shanzisheng (扇子生; "fan sheng"), is a young Confucian scholar who has yet to pass the imperial examination. He wears the rujin ("Confucian cloth") on his head and often holds a hand fan. This role is often featured in romantic dramas and requires the ability to play with the fan to exude an air of elegance and class.

A slightly different version is the qiongsheng (窮生; "poor sheng"), also known as kusheng (苦生; "suffering sheng") or xiepisheng (鞋皮生; "shoe-skin sheng"), the impoverished young scholar. Although optimistic for the future, he is dejected and frustrated, and drags his feet in half-on shoes when he walks. In kunqu, he sings and talks with a "sad sound" and does not dance.

The shamaosheng (紗帽生; "gauze-cap sheng"), known as xiaoguansheng (小官生; "young-official sheng") or 小冠生 ("small-crown sheng") or simply guansheng (官生; "official sheng") in kunqu, is a young scholar who recently passed the imperial examination and became a scholar-official. He wears the futou and a belt which could only be worn by government officials.

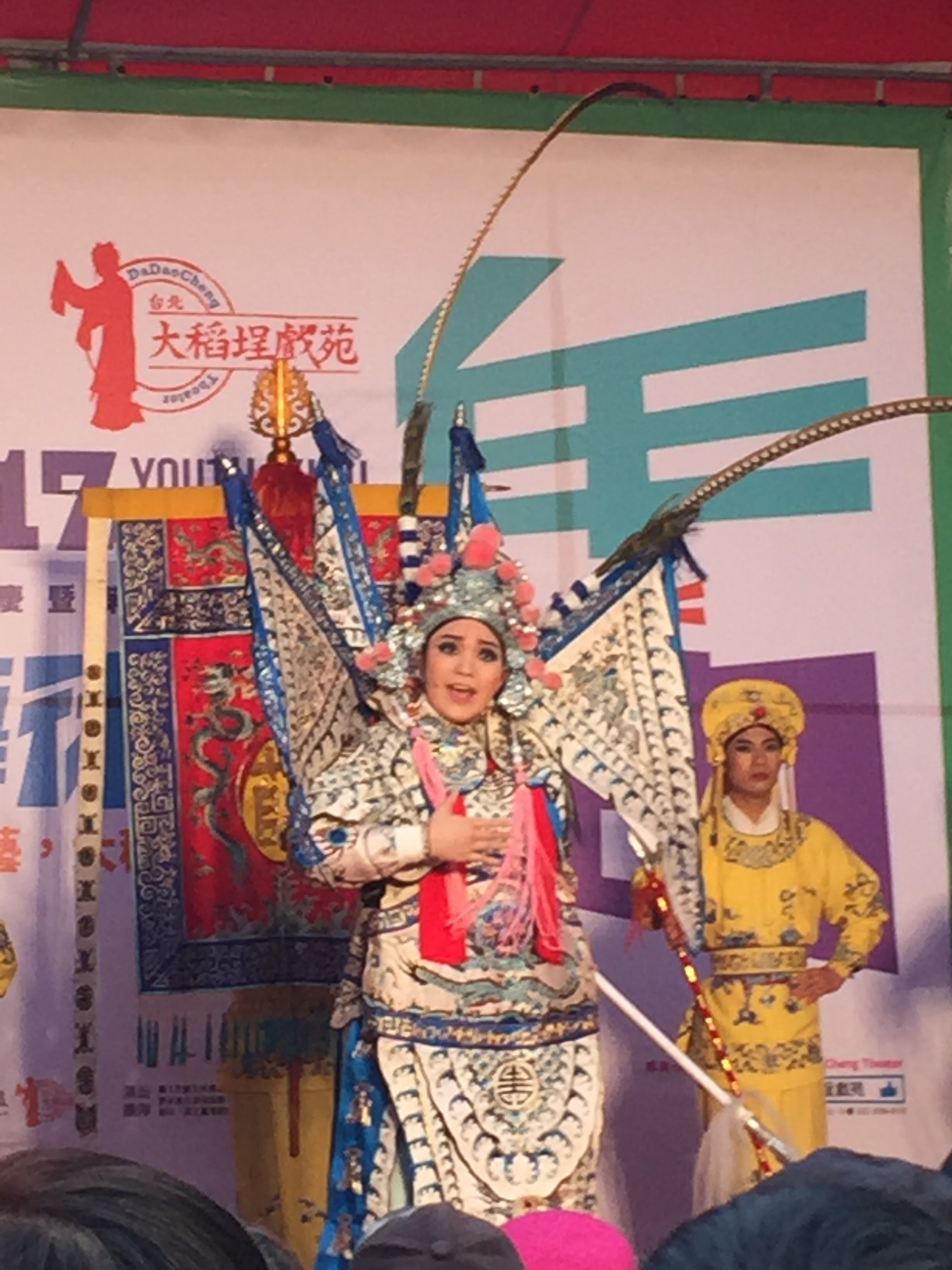
A Taiwanese opera actress portrays the young warrior Xue Dingshan, with two long pheasant tail feathers extending from her headwear.

=== Warriors ===
Beardless warriors who only "fight" on stage are considered wusheng rather than xiaosheng. However, the young warrior who sings is known as the wuxiaosheng (武小生; "martial xiaosheng"). A wuxiaosheng with some stature wears a cap with two long pheasant tail feathers attached and is known as the zhiweisheng (雉尾生) or lingzisheng (翎子生; "pheasant-tail sheng"); this is usually a young general or a general's young son. A zhiweisheng actor must be skilled at handling the feathers with their hands to express emotions.

In Cantonese opera, the leading male role is usually the wenwusheng (文武生; man-mou-saang), (Hakka: vun-vu-sang, "civil wusheng") which combined the xiaosheng and the wusheng into one role. (On the other hand, the junior wenwusheng or the secondary male role is known as the xiaosheng or siu-saang.) This role type is also present in Hakka opera.

=== Others ===
Jia Baoyu (an aristocrat), Tang Sanzang (Buddhist monk), Xu Xian (physician), Jiang Yuhan (actor) and Han Xiangzi (mythological figure) are examples of other xiaosheng characters.

== Vocal techniques ==
In Peking opera, the xiaosheng's singing style is a mix between falsetto and chest voice and is therefore known as the "yin-yang voice" (陰陽嗓子).

== See also ==
- Tachiyaku in Kabuki
