= Zhao Lei (actor) =

Chinese actor

Zhao Lei (Chinese: 趙雷; Wade–Giles: Chao Lei; 1928 – 24 June 1996) was a Chinese actor who was one of the most popular male leads in the cinema of Hong Kong and Taiwan in the 1950s and 60s, often called the "Film Emperor".

Zhao was born Wang Yumin (Chinese: 王育民) in Ding County, Hebei, China in 1928 and moved to Hong Kong in the 1940s. He began working for Shaw Brothers Studio in 1953, and left for Cathay-Keris Films ten years later. Zhao was given the Golden Horse Award for Best Leading Actor in 1966. He continued acting into the 1970s, and spent the latter half of the decade operating a restaurant in Taipei. In his acting career, Zhao appeared in over one hundred films. He died in Hong Kong of pneumonia on 24 June 1996, aged 68.

Zhao's wife Shi Ying (石英) was also an actress with Shaw Brothers.

== Selected filmography ==
- The Kingdom and the Beauty (1959)
- The Enchanting Shadow (1960)
- The Magnificent Concubine (1962)
- Empress Wu Tse-Tien (1963)
- Cheating Panorama (1972)
