= Empress Wu Tse-Tien (1963 film) =

1963 Hong Kong film by Li Han-hsiang

Empress Wu Tse-Tien (武則天)
- Film poster
- Directed by: Li Han-hsiang
- Written by: Li Han Hsiang; Yueting Wang
- Produced by: Doven Chow; Runme Shaw
- Starring: Li Li-hua
- Cinematography: Nishimoto Tadashi
- Edited by: Chiang Hsing-Lung
- Music by: Wang Shun
- Production company: Shaw Brothers Studio
- Release date: 14 June 1963 (Hong Kong)
- Running time: 112 minutes
- Country: Hong Kong
- Language: Mandarin

Empress Wu Tse-Tien (Chinese: 武則天, translit. Wu Ze Tian) is a 1963 Hong Kong drama film directed by Li Han Hsiang, about the life of Empress Wu Zetian. It was entered into the 1963 Cannes Film Festival.

== Cast ==
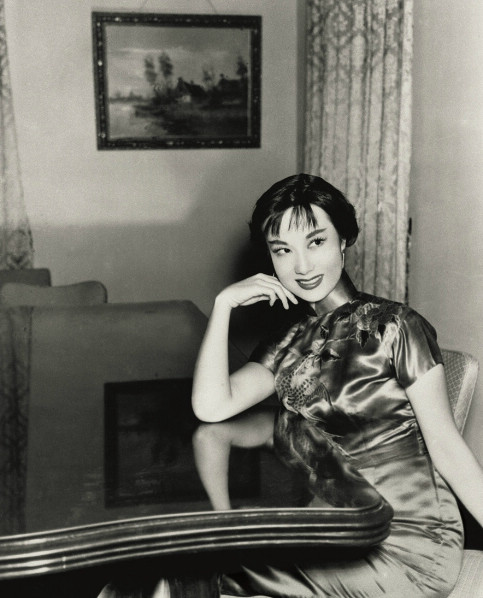
Li Li-Hua portrayed the title role of Wu Zetian

- Li Li-Hua as Wu Zetian
- Zhao Lei as Emperor Gaozong of Tang
- Diana Chang Chung Wen as Empress Wang
- Chun Yen as Xu Yougong
- Grace Ting Ning as Shangguan Wan'er
- Chuang Chiao as Crown Prince Zhanghuai
- Paul Chang as Zhang Yizhi
- Ying Choi Cheung as Zhang Changzong
- Kao Pao-shu as Lady Shangguan
- Wei Lo as Pei Yan
- King Hu as Zhao Daosheng
- Mu Zhu as outspoken man at restaurant
