= Jiang Yuhan =

Dream of the Red Chamber character

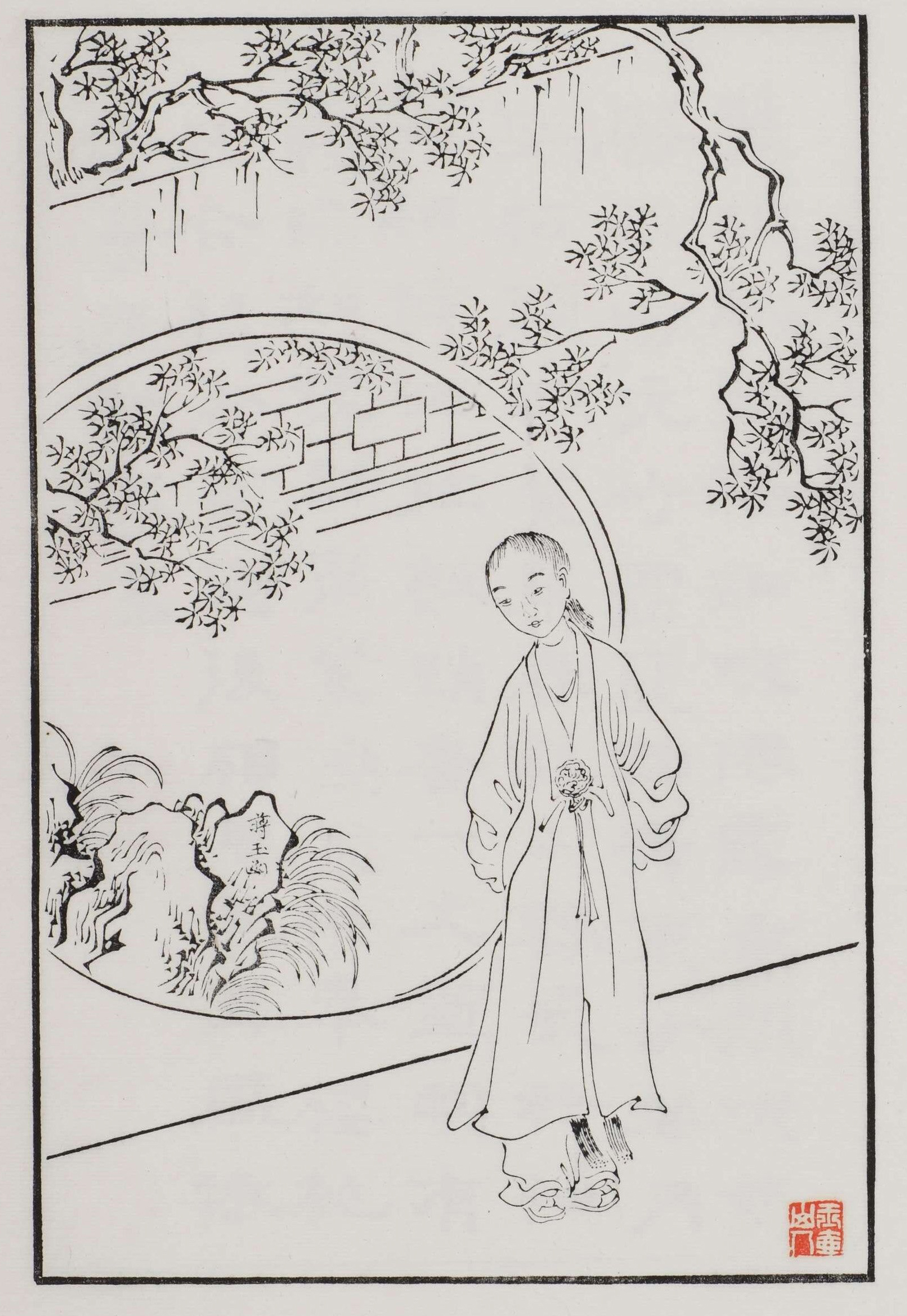
Jiang Yuhan, illustrated by Gai Qi.

Jiang Yuhan (Chinese: 蔣玉函; pinyin: Jiǎng Yùhán), stage name Qiguan, is a fictional Chinese opera actor from the Chinese novel Dream of the Red Chamber. He specializes in dan roles (i.e., he impersonates women).

Described as handsome and effeminate, Jiang Yuhan is a bosom friend of the novel's protagonist Jia Baoyu, with whom he exchanges intimate gifts. The nature of their relationship (platonic or sexual?) has been the subject of numerous studies, including one by Pai Hsien-yung after he moved to the US and became interested in sexuality.

Another admirer is Prince of Beijing. In the Cheng–Gao versions, Jiang Yuhan marries Baoyu's maid Hua Xiren in Chapter 120, the last chapter of the novel. This follows Chapter 28 of the "original" work, where Baoyu gives Xiren's sash to Jiang Yuhan.
