= Song of Tomorrow (2010 film) =

2010 Swedish film

- poster
- Swedish: Framtidens melodi
- Directed by: Janos Holmström; Janos Bergergård
- Screenplay by: Janos Holmström; Janos Bergergård
- Produced by: Daniel Wirtberg
- Starring: Sven-Olof Molin; Rolf G. Ekroth; Helena Bengtsson; Thomas Christensson
- Cinematography: Janos Bergergård
- Edited by: Janos Holmström
- Production company: Daemon Film
- Release dates: January 30, 2010 (Gothenburg Film Festival); June 10, 2011 (Sweden)
- Running time: 84 minutes
- Country: Sweden
- Language: Swedish

Song of Tomorrow (Swedish: Framtidens melodi) is a 2010 Swedish indie film directed by Janos Holmström and Janos Bergergård. The film debuted in the 2010 Gothenburg Film Festival on January 30, 2010, and was shown on Sveriges Television on August 31, 2010, before released in domestic theatres on June 10, 2011.

== Plot ==
The film is set in Karlstad. Frizzy-haired Janos (Sven-Olof Molin) is already mid-aged but has no jobs and no aspirations. He sings ballads on the street with a guitar and picks the garbage for food, yet he is content with his carefree life. He sometimes helps out old man Stig Manner (Rolf G. Ekroth) who walks with a cane to sell used goods. Obviously unsatisfied with Janos' lack of achievements, Stig tries hard to launch a musical career for him. He calls himself Janos' manager and takes Janos to different places for performing and recording opportunities, but Janos is completely disinterested which frustrates him. Around this time, Stig receives a voice mail from his estranged daughter Catrin (Helena Bengtsson), who has arrived in town from Stockholm with her infant son. Stig is afraid to meet his daughter, but sends her a CD with Janos' recordings. He has a stroke and requires the use of a wheelchair. Janos discovers Stig has a daughter who only wants to meet Stig to introduce him to her son. He puts Stig on a train to Stockholm and calls Catrin.

== Awards and nominations ==
- 2011 Film Festival del Garda (Italy) - Audience Prize
- 2011 Festival Internacional de Cine en la Ciudad de México (Mexico) - Best Actor, Rolf G. Ekroth
