= Tang Ching =

Chinese film actor and businessman (1924–2019)

Tang Ching (Chinese: 唐菁; 1 January 1924 - 2019) was a Chinese film actor and businessman. Born in Zhengzhou, China, he primarily worked in the Cinema of Taiwan and the Cinema of Hong Kong, and starred in at least 70 films between 1956 and 1984, most of them kung-fu films of the 1970s.

He initially moved to Taiwan in 1949, following the Chinese Civil War, where he joined the army troupe that same year. He began his acting career there at the Agricultural Education Films Company and was then contracted by the Motion Picture & General Investment Co. Ltd by Yuen Chau Fung in 1963. He joined the Shaw Brothers studio in Hong Kong in 1967.
