= Kuo Liang-hui =

Taiwanese novelist

Kuo Liang-hui 郭良蕙
- Born: Kuo Liang-hui (Chinese: 郭良蕙); 17 August 1926; Kaifeng, Henan
- Died: 19 June 2013 (aged 86); Taipei, Taiwan
- Resting place: Taipei, Taiwan
- Other names: Gloria
- Occupation: Novelist
- Known for: Romance fiction, the most beautiful female writer

Kuo Liang-hui (Chinese: 郭良蕙; 17 August 1926 in Kaifeng, Henan – 19 June 2013 in Taiwan) was a Taiwanese novelist. Several of her works were turned into films.

== Early life ==
Kuo Liang-hui was born in the Juye County in Shandong Province. She completed high school in Xi’an during the Second Sino-Japanese War and started reading poetry at age of 16. She attended Sichuan University and became a student of Huang Ji Lu (Chinese: 黃季陸) and received a Foreign Language degree at Fudan University. Kuo moved to Chiayi, Taiwan after marrying Sun Ji-dong, pilot of the Republic of China Air Force in 1949. To increase income for living, Kuo started off with novel translations (including works of Guy de Maupassant), and soon became a novelist. Further to her first short story Young Group in Alley, she has a few columns in a number of renown magazines and her serialisation of novel Niwa edge made her a more confirmed position in the world of literature. She was named ‘the most beautiful female writer’ because of her appearance and attitude. At the time when The Lock of Hearts was published, Kuo shot to fame whilst she was criticised and prohibited on her sexual and ‘immoral’ affair topics and let to the biggest crisis in her writing career. Although this incident stroke a heavy blow and upset Kuo, she did not give up writing. At the same time, The Lock of Hearts became the hottest book selling below the ground which further boosted her name. In 1971, she travelled around the world on her own, leading her to the study heritage and arts. The Third Sex, published in 1978, was again one of the first novels ever talked about homosexuality. As a brave, top-of-the-era female, Kuo later on established Kuo Liang Hui New Enterprise Co., Ltd., also to publish travel journals.

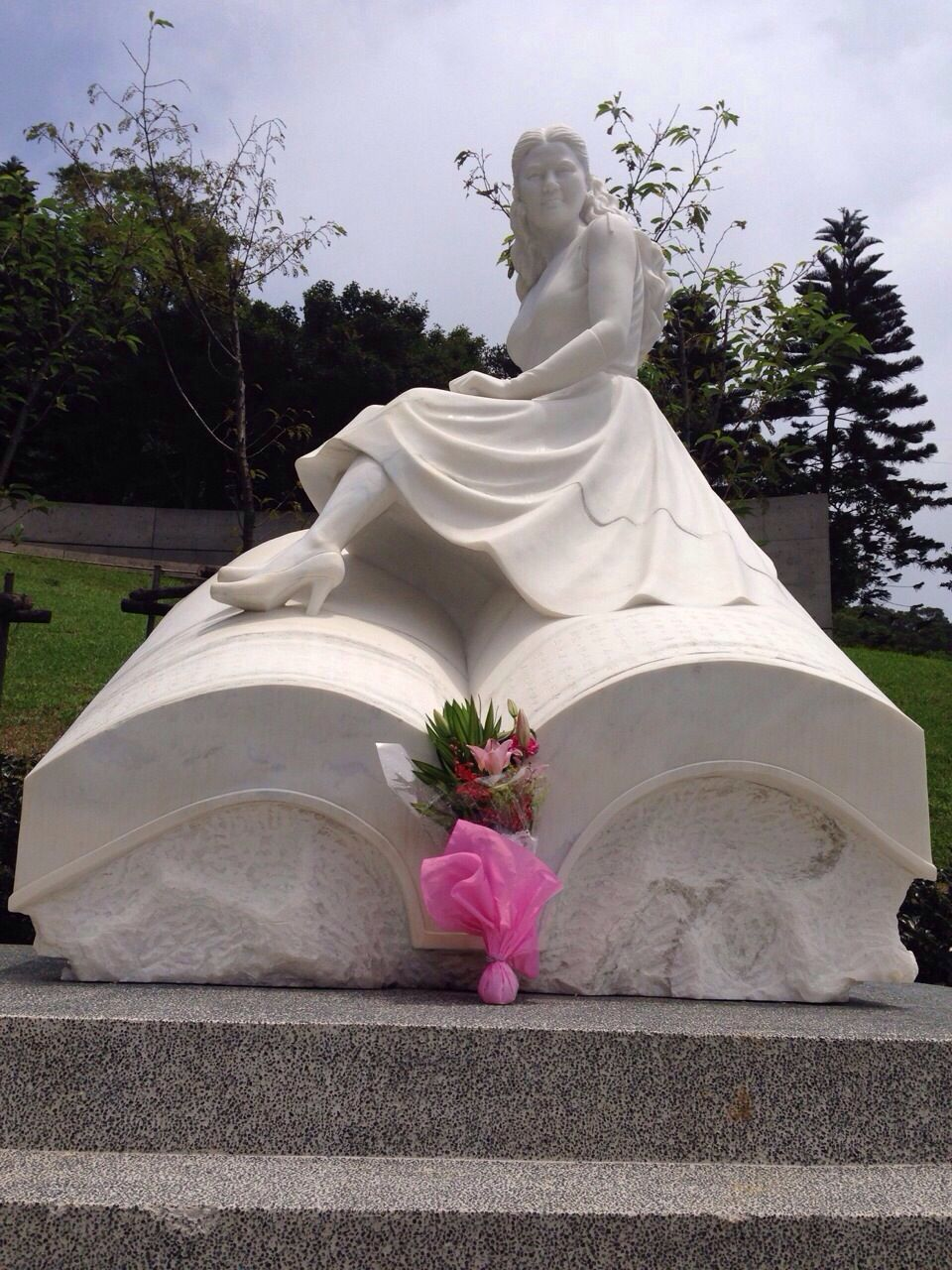
Made of white jade stone, 1:1.5 statue of Kuo Liang Hui

On 19 June 2013, Kuo died from stroke. Her statue is located in the celebrity cemetery zone of Chin Pao San, Jinshan District, New Taipei, Taiwan.
