= Song of Tomorrow (1967 film) =

1967 Hong Kong film by Doe Ching

- Film poster
- Chinese: 明日之歌
- Hanyu Pinyin: Míngrì Zhī Gē
- Directed by: Doe Ching
- Written by: Doe Ching
- Based on: Song of Tomorrow by Fang Lung-hsiang
- Produced by: Runme Shaw
- Starring: Ivy Ling Po; Chiao Chuang; Chin Han
- Cinematography: Charles Tung, Jr.
- Edited by: Chiang Hsing-lung
- Music by: Joseph Koo; Wang Chu Jen
- Production company: Shaw Brothers Studio
- Release date: 12 October 1967
- Country: Hong Kong
- Language: Mandarin

Song of Tomorrow is a 1967 Hong Kong drama film written and directed by Doe Ching, based on Fang Lung-hsiang's novel of the same name. The story is about a woman's struggle to set her love free from substance dependence.

== Plot ==
After her father's death, Su Ling (Ivy Ling Po) struggles to support her ill mother and disabled brother, but Mr. Su's former student Chiang Sung-ping (Chiao Chuang), a virtuoso drummer, does everything to help them. With Chiang's help, Su Ling becomes a skilled singer and performs in nightclub with him. They fall in love, but one day Su learns that Chiang is dependent on a drug to help him focus. Chiang promises that he would quit, but soon Su finds out otherwise and breaks up with him. Later, after listening to Chiang's explanation, Su realizes how they love each other and is determined to help him recover from the drug addiction. They get married and go to a resort for their honeymoon. Everything is blissful, but the possibility of her husband smoking the substance again is always in the back of Su's mind.

== Cast ==
This is a partial list of cast.

- Ivy Ling Po - Su Ling
- Kiu Chong - Jiang Song Ping
- Chin Han - Yu Ming
- Shen Yi - Bai Lu
- Lui Ming - David Zhu
- Chen Hung-Lieh - Xiao Ding
- Tien Shun - Manager Chan
- Ma Hsiao-Nung - Ling's mother
