= Ching Miao =

Chinese actor from Taiwan

- Born: March 15, 1913; Jinan, Shandong, Republic of China
- Died: 1989 (aged 75–76); Taipei, Taiwan
- Children: 1
- Relatives: Ching Li (daughter)
- Awards: Golden Horse Awards – Best Supporting Actor; 1964 Between Tears and Smiles; 1967 Too Late for Love

Chinese name
- Traditional Chinese: 井淼
Transcriptions
Standard Mandarin
- Hanyu Pinyin: Jǐng Miǎo
Yue: Cantonese
- Jyutping: Zeng2 Miu5
- Musical career
- Also known as: Cheng Miu, Tsen Miao, Tseng Miao, etc.

Ching Miao (Chinese: 井淼; March 15, 1913 – 1989) was a Taiwanese actor born in Shandong, China. He had appeared in over 190 films, mostly in Hong Kong for the Shaw Brothers Studio.

He won the Best Supporting Actor for Golden Horse Awards twice, for Between Tears and Smiles (1964) and Too Late for Love (1967) respectively.

Actress Ching Li is his daughter.

== Filmography ==
- 1940 Storm on the Border
- 1945 My Homeland - Miao Du-Shan.
