= Lee Kwan =

Chinese actor (1930–2008)

- Born: 李心亮 Lee Sum Leung; 18 February 1930; Tianjin, China
- Died: 12 March 2008 (aged 78); Taipei, Taiwan
- Years active: 1957–2008
- Awards: Golden Bell Awards; 2001 Best Supporting Actor (逆女)

Chinese name
Transcriptions
Standard Mandarin
- Hanyu Pinyin: Lǐ Kūn
Yue: Cantonese
- Jyutping: Lei^{5} Gwan^{1}
- Musical career
- Also known as: Li Kun; Kun Li; Li Quinn; Lee Quinn

Lee Kwan or Li Kun (18 February 1930 – 12 March 2008) was a Chinese actor.

He joined Shaw Brothers in 1957 and acted in Mandarin films. He later played supporting roles in Bruce Lee's The Big Boss and Fist of Fury. Later he became a film and television actor in Taiwan. He won the 2001 Golden Bell Award for Best Supporting Actor in a Miniseries or Television Film for his role in Forbidden Love.

Lee Kwan died of a stroke on March 12, 2008 in Taipei at the age of 78.

== Filmography ==
=== Film ===
Year	English title	Original title	Role	Notes
1956	General "Soaring Tiger	飛虎將軍		
1957	Mambo Girl	曼波女郎	Schoolmate	
1958	The Magic Touch	妙手回春		
1958	The Blessed Family	全家福	Lin Teng-lung	
1959	Spring Song	青春兒女	Schoolmate	
1959	Air Hostess	空中小姐		
1959	Er nu ying xiong chuan			
1960	The Enchanting Shadow	倩女幽魂	Servant to Scholar #2	
1960	A Challenge of Love	入室佳人		
1960	Tragic Melody	桃花淚	Li Zhanglin	
1960	Black Butterfly	黑蝴蝶		
1961	The Girl Next Door	隔牆艷史		
1961	The Pistol	手鎗		
1961	The Fair Sex	神仙老虎狗		
1964	Between Tears and Smiles	新啼笑姻缘		
1970	A Time for Love	那個不多情		
1971	The Big Boss	唐山大兄	Ah Kun	
1972	Fist of Fury	精武門	Hsu	
1980	The Rebellious Reign	雍正與年羹堯		
