= Betty Loh Ti =

Chinese actress from Hong Kong

- Chinese: 樂蒂
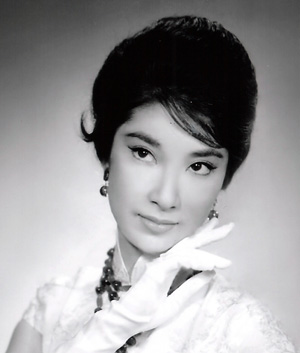
- Loh in 1962
- Born: Hsi Chung-i; 24 July 1937; Shanghai, Republic of China
- Died: 27 December 1968 (aged 31); British Hong Kong
- Occupation: Actress
- Years active: 1952–1968
- Spouse: Peter Chen Ho (m. 1962; div. 1967)
- Children: Chen Mingming
- Relatives: Kelly Lai Chen (brother)
- Awards: Golden Horse Awards – Best Actress; 1963 The Love Eterne

Chinese name
- Traditional Chinese: 樂蒂
- Simplified Chinese: 乐蒂
Transcriptions
Standard Mandarin
- Hanyu Pinyin: Lè Dì
Yue: Cantonese
- Jyutping: Lok^{6} Dai^{3}

Hsi Chung-i
- Traditional Chinese: 奚重儀
- Simplified Chinese: 奚重仪
Transcriptions
Standard Mandarin
- Hanyu Pinyin: Xī Zhòngyí
- Wade–Giles: Hsi Chung-yi

Betty Loh Ti (July 24, 1937 – December 27, 1968), known as Loh Tih for short, was a Hong Kong actress originally from Shanghai. Known as the "Classic Beauty", she was one of the most celebrated actresses of Hong Kong cinema. She is most famous for her roles in the 1960 film The Enchanting Shadow, for which she was called "China's most beautiful actress" by the jury of the 1960 Cannes Film Festival, and The Love Eterne, which earned her the Golden Horse Award for Best Leading Actress in 1963. She died from barbiturate overdose at the age of 31.

== Early life ==
Betty Loh Ti was born as Hsi Chung-i on 24 July 1937 into a prominent family from Pudong, the owner of the Xi Fu Ji (奚福記) Factory in Shanghai. She was born in the midst of the Battle of Shanghai, one of the bloodiest battles of the Second Sino-Japanese War, during which her father was killed by Japanese bombing before she was born.

She was the youngest of six siblings; her elder brother (born Hsi Chungchien) would grow up to become renowned actor Kelly Lai Chen. Her pet name was "Liuti" (六弟, literally "sixth brother", Loh Di in Shanghainese), which was later transformed into her stage name Loh Ti. Their maternal grandfather was the tycoon Ku Chu-hsuan, who owned the Tianchan Theater, then Shanghai's grandest theater for Chinese opera. Growing up near the opera house, she became interested in acting since early childhood and often sang along with Peking opera actors.

After their mother died in 1948, the children were brought up by their maternal grandmother. In 1949, her grandmother brought the children to Hong Kong, as part of the mass exodus from mainland China after the Communist victory in the Chinese Civil War.

== Career ==
In Hong Kong, Loh's family lived next door to Yuan Yang-an, a cofounder and top executive of Great Wall Movie Enterprises. The studio signed a five-year contract with her in 1952, when she was 15. She debuted in the 1953 film The Peerless Beauty (絕代佳人). At Great Wall, she was eclipsed by the company's "Three Princesses" such as Hsia Moon, and was mainly cast in supporting roles. The sole exception was the 1957 film Suspicion, in which she played the female lead.

After her contract with Great Wall expired in 1958, Loh defected to Shaw Brothers Studio, which gave her more important roles. In The Magic Touch (妙手回春, 1958), her first film with Shaw Brothers, her performance as the famous fictional beauty Lin Daiyu earned her the nickname "Classic Beauty". Her 1960 film The Enchanting Shadow was a breakout success. It received an enthusiastic reception at the 1960 Cannes Film Festival, whose jury praised her as "China's most beautiful actress". In 1963, she played Zhu Yingtai, the female lead in the blockbuster The Love Eterne directed by Li Han-hsiang. It was considered her signature piece, and she won the Golden Horse Award for Best Leading Actress for her performance.

Loh joined Motion Picture & General Investment (MP&GI) in 1964. In 1967, she founded her own studio, Golden Eagle Film Company, together with her brother Kelly Lai Chen and director Yuan Chiufeng. She starred in 11 films from 1964 until her death in 1968.

== Personal life and death ==
Loh married actor Peter Chen Ho in January 1962, and gave birth to a daughter named Chen Mingming in September 1962, but they divorced in 1967.

On December 27, 1968, Loh was found unconscious in her apartment in Kowloon. She was sent to Queen Elizabeth Hospital but died from barbiturate overdose. She was 31.

== Legacy ==
Despite her untimely death, she is considered a screen legend. In 2017, the Hong Kong Film Archive organized an exhibition to commemorate her 80th birth anniversary. According to the organizers, Loh's "talent and charm remain unsurpassed to this day".

== Filmography ==
With Great Wall Movie Enterprises (1953–1958):

- The Peerless Beauty (1953)
- Tales of the City (1954)
- Loves of the Youngsters (1955)
- Diamond Thief (1955)
- The Apartment for Women (1956)
- Sunrise (1956)
- Three Loves (1956)
- A Widow's Tears (1956)
- The Song of Harmony (1957)
- Suspicion (1957)
- The Chivalrous Songstress (1957)
- Love Affairs of a Confirmed Bachelor (1959)

With Shaw Brothers Studio (1958–1964):

- The Magic Touch (1958)
- Love Letter Murder (1959)
- The Adventures of the Thirteenth Sister (1959)
- The Deformed (1959)
- The Malayan Affair (1960)
- Back Door (1960)
- Love Thy Neighbour (1960)
- The Enchanting Shadow (1960)
- When the Peach Blossoms Bloom (1960)
- The Rose of Summer (1961)
- 1961 The Pistol
- 1962 The Bride Napping
- 1962 Dream of the Red Chamber
- 1962 Mid-Nightmare (Part One)
- 1963 Mid-Nightmare (Part Two)
- 1963 Revenge of a Swordswoman
- 1963 The Love Eterne
- 1963 My Lucky Star
- 1964 The Dancing Millionairess - Mei Xin-Yue
- 1964 The Story of Sue San
- 1965 Sons of the Good Earth

With MP&GI and Golden Eagle (1965–1968):

- A Beggar's Daughter (1965)
- The Longest Night (1965)
- The Lucky Purse (1966)
- Lady in the Moon (1966)
- A Debt of Blood (1966)
- The Magic Fan (1967)
- Darling, Stay at Home (1968)
- Travels with a Sword (1968)
- Red Plum Pavilion (1968)

== See also ==
- Cinema of Hong Kong
- Le Yiqin (another celebrated Chinese figure in modern history with same unusual "樂/乐" - Le/Loh surname)
