= Huangmei opera =

Form of Chinese opera

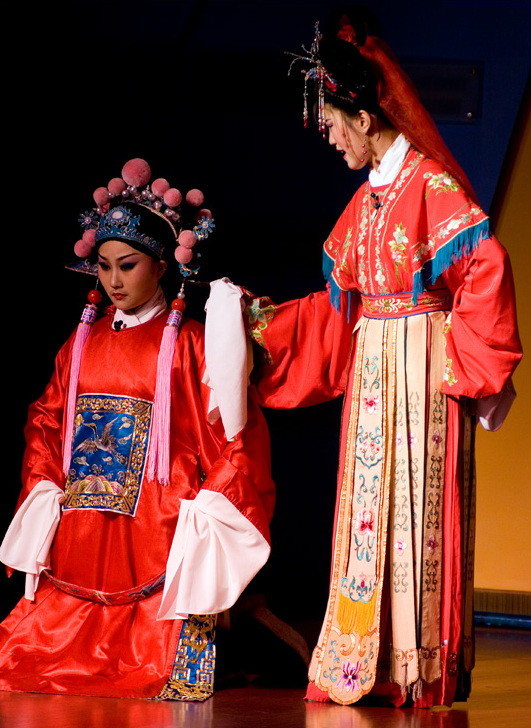
Huangmei opera performance in Shanghai, featuring two female performers

Huangmei Opera or Huangmei tone (黃梅戲 or 黃梅調, pinyin: Huángméixì or Huángméidiào) is a form of Chinese opera originating from the Huangmeishan mountain in Huaining County, Anhui province, as a form of rural folk song and dance. It is also referred to as Anhui Opera. It has been in existence for the last 200 years and possibly longer. Huangmei opera is one of the most famous and mainstream opera in China (others are Beijing opera, Yue opera, Ping opera and Yu opera), and is a class of the typical Anhui opera. The original Huangmei opera was sung by women in Anqing areas when they were picking tea, and the opera was called the Picking Tea Song. In the late Qing dynasty, the songs were popular in Anhui Huaining County adjacent regions, combined with the local folk art, Anqing dialect with singing and chants, and gradually developed into a newborn's operas. The music is performed with a pitch that hits high and stays high for the duration of the song. It is unique in the sense that it does not sound like the typical rhythmic Chinese opera. In the 1960s Hong Kong counted the style as much as an opera as it was a music genre. Today it is more of a traditional performance art with efforts of revival in mainland China, Hong Kong, and Taiwan, and mostly sung in Mandarin. In 2006, Huangmei Opera was selected for the first batch of China's national intangible cultural heritage.

== History ==
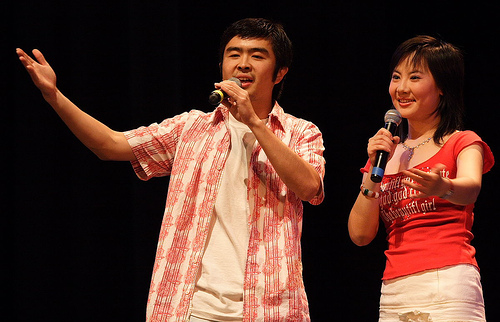
Informal performance of Huangmei opera

=== Mainland China ===
Huangmei Opera was originally known as "Huangmei Picking Tea Tune." Regarding its origins, there is still no scholarly consensus, and the issue remains highly debated. The only thing that can be confirmed is that this art form originated from the greater Huangmeishan area in Huaining County, Anhui Province, China. Generally accepted opinion is that the opera is from the greater Huangmeishan area (junction of Anhui and Hubei and Jiangxi Province). It became a part of the operatic genre in the Anqing region of southwestern Anhui province before 18th century. Huangmei opera did not involve the traditional opera gestures which often used the sleeves and step movements. It was also not performed on stage initially but as a kind of roving troupe performance.

The Huangmei opera was active in Anhui Province, Hubei Province and Jiangxi Province in the late 19th century. From the Revolution of 1911 to 1949, Huangmei performances gradually became professional, from rural areas to city stages. After Huangmei arrived in Anqing City from the counties of Haining, Susong, Tongcheng, artists developed the opera and borrowed performance styles from other operas. They reformed the traditional chants, reducing the function words to make the drama easy to understand with a lively rhythm. 1952 is a key year for Huangmei opera. It was during this year that the excellent artists Yan Fengying, Wang Shaofang and others gave performances in Shanghai for a big opera festival. Audiences from various areas were shocked and appreciated Huangmei opera, attracted by its new singing forms and stories. Huangmei opera became very popular and famous after that. The big success evoked the passion of Huangmei opera artists and they created The Marriage of A Fairy Princess and Female Consort Prince which are classics.

Eighteen miles away (十八相送)
A huangmei opera song by veteran artist Ivy Ling Po partnering with Jenny Tseng

=== Hong Kong ===
The theme of Huangmei opera began to expand with its initial introduction in Hong Kong via the 1959 film The Kingdom and the Beauty (江山美人). The artform is believed to have come from the massive wave of immigrants from mainland China to Hong Kong in the 1950s. The film that peaked the music genre was 1963's The Love Eterne. The audience was attracted by the rewritten music style which combined both Chinese and Western musical instruments. The tempo was also livelier and faster than the traditional opera. During this period, many Huangmei films were made, evolving into various forms and combinations, which later included wuxia sword fights. Because the genre has such a heavy association with romance films like The Love Eterne, it is sometimes preferred that the singing be done with a male and a female pair.

There has only been a handful of big name Huangmei artists in Hong Kong. Betty Loh Ti and Ivy Ling Po, Tsin Ting are some examples.

== Costumes ==
Huangmei costumes are generally less extravagant compared to the other Chinese opera branches. There is usually a greater emphasis on the singing than the display. In Hong Kong there is not necessarily a requirement to wear any traditional Chinese opera attire. An example is the cantopop artist Jenny Tseng singing Huangmei style music with Ivy Ling Po in a concert.

== Artistic features ==
The melody of Huangmei Opera is a plate-like variant, with three lumens: flower cavity, color cavity, and main tone. The flower cavity is mainly composed of small plays, the tone is healthy and simple, beautiful and cheerful, with a strong sense of life and the color of the folk songs; the color cavity is very popular, and it has been widely used in the small dramas; the main theme is the vocal used in the traditional Chinese drama of Huangmei opera. The Huangmei Opera is pure and fresh, exquisite and moving, with a bright and expressive sensibility, rich in expressiveness, easy to understand, easy to popularize, and deeply loved by people all over China.

== Performance ==
=== Role types ===
There are Xiaosheng, Xiaodan, Chou role, Zhengdan, Laosheng, Laochou and so on in Huangmei Opera. The classification of Huangmei opera is not strict.

In the early days, Huangmei Opera was mainly based on "two small plays" (Xiaosheng, Xiaodan) and "three small plays" (Xiaosheng, Xiaodan, Chou role).

=== Work ===
On the basis of its own development, the workmanship of the Huangmei opera draws lessons from some characteristics of the Peking Opera, Kunqu Opera, and Sichuan Opera, and is unique.

== Famous People ==
=== Actor ===
- Ivy Ling Po, Yan Fengying, Wang Shaofang, Huang Zongyi, Zhou Shan, Huang Xinde, Zhang Hui, Wang Ailing, Ma Lan, Han Zaifen, Guan Junhua, Liu Qiuping, Pan Jingli, Xiong Shaoyun, Wu Qiong, Yuan Mei, Wang Linghua

=== Writing ===
- Sang arc
- Wang Guanya
- Jin Zhi: His main works include "Ask for Learning Money", "Fighting the Reed Flower", "The Story of Luo Pa", "The Legend of Liu Ming", "Hu Xueyan, a Hui merchant", etc. based on adaptations of traditional plays.

=== Compose ===
- Shi Bailin

== Team ==
Famous Huangmei opera troupes include Anhui Huangmei Theater, Anqing Huangmei Theater, Hubei Huangmei Theater and so on. Taiwan's theater troupes include Wang Youlan Huangmei Diaojuyifang, Yunqingyue Dance Troupe, etc.

== Education ==
Huangmei Opera is the third Chinese opera genre with undergraduate education. Anqing Normal University has an undergraduate major in Huangmei Opera performance. In addition, there is a professional Huangmei opera school. Anhui Huangmei Opera Art Vocational College is a full-time comprehensive public higher art college approved by the Anhui Provincial People's Government and filed by the Ministry of Education. It was established in April 2011. Its predecessor was Anhui Huangmei Opera School established in 1958.

== See also ==
- Music of Hong Kong
