= Li Han-hsiang =

Chinese film director (1926–1996)

- Born: March 7, 1926; Jinxi, Liaoning, Republic of China
- Died: December 17, 1996 (aged 70); Beijing, People's Republic of China
- Occupation: Film director
- Years active: 1953–1994
- Awards: Cannes Film Festival Technical Grand Prize; 1962 The Magnificent ConcubineGolden Horse Awards – Best Director; 1963 The Love Eterne; 1966 Hsi Shih: Beauty of Beauties; Best Original Screenplay; 1971 The Story of Ti Ying; 1979 The Voyage of Emperor Chien Lung; Life Achievement Award; 1997 Lifetime Achievement

Chinese name
- Traditional Chinese: 李翰祥
- Simplified Chinese: 李翰祥
Transcriptions
Standard Mandarin
- Hanyu Pinyin: Lǐ Hànxiáng
Yue: Cantonese
- Jyutping: Lei5 Hon6coeng4

Richard Li Han-hsiang (Chinese: 李翰祥; pinyin: Lǐ Hànxiáng; 7 March 1926 in Jinxi, Liaoning – 17 December 1996 in Beijing) was a Chinese film director. Li directed more than 70 films in his career beginning in the 1950s and lasting till the 1990s. His The Enchanting Shadow, The Magnificent Concubine, and Empress Wu Tse-Tien were entered into the Cannes Film Festival in 1960, 1962, and 1963 respectively.

Li also won the Golden Horse Film Festival and Awards for his work on the movie Xi Shi in 1965. Most of his movies in the 1970s and 1980s were Chinese historical dramas. He died in Beijing due to a heart attack. He was seventy.

== Filmography ==
=== Films ===
This is a partial list of films.

Year	Title	Role	Notes
1954	Lady from the Moon	Director	Co-director with Chiang Nan and Gu Sam-Lam.
1956	Red Bloom in the Snow	Director	Director film debut.
1956	Beyond the Blue Horizon	Director, screenwriter	
1957	A Mating Story		
1957	Lady in Distress		
1957	Little Angels of the Streets		
1957	A Mellow Spring		
1957	He Has Taken Him for Another		
1958	Give Me a Kiss		
1958	The Magic Touch		
1958	Diau Charn		
1958	The Angel		
1958	Dan Fung Street		
1958	The Blessed Family		
1959	Love Letter Murder	Director	
1959	The Kingdom and the Beauty		Singapore submission for the Academy Award for Best International Feature Film.
1959	The Adventure of the 13th Sister	Director	
1960	Rear Entrance	Director	
1960	The Enchanting Shadow		Hong Kong submission for the Academy Award for Best Foreign Language Film
1962	The Magnificent Concubine		
1963	Empress Wu Tse-Tien		
1963	The Love Eterne		Hong Kong submission for the Academy Award for Best Foreign Language Film.
1972	Legends of Lust		
1972	Cheating Panorama		
1972	The Admired Girl		
1973	Cheat to Cheat	Director, screenwriter	
1973	The Happiest Moments	Director, screenwriter	
1973	Illicit Desire	Director, writer	
1974	Scoundrel	Director, screenwriter	
1975	The Empress Dowager	Director, screenwriter	Winner of Best Art Direction—Color and Best Leading Actress (Lisa Lu) Awards at 1975 Golden Horse Film Festival
1976	The Last Tempest		Hong Kong submission for the Academy Award for Best Foreign Language Film
1976	Love Swindlers		
1977	The Dream of the Red Chamber		Winner of Best Art Direction Awards at 1978 Asia-Pacific Film Festival and Golden Horse Film Festival
1983	The Burning of the Imperial Palace	Director	
1983	Reign Behind a Curtain	Director	
1986	The Last Emperor (1986 film)		
1986	Snuff Bottle		
1989	The West Empress		

== Awards ==
- Star. Avenue of Stars. Tsim Sha Tsui waterfront in Hong Kong.

== See also ==
- Stone House (Diamond Hill)
