= Fan Ruijuan =

Chinese opera singer

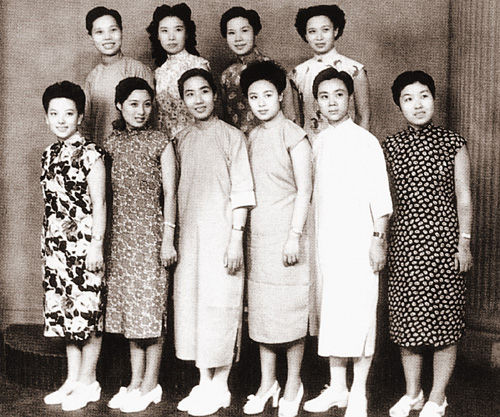
Ten Yue Opera performers, dubbed "Ten Sisters", in 1947. Front row (L-R): Xu Tianhong, Fu Quanxiang, Yuan Xuefen, Zhu Shuizhao, Fan Ruijuan, and Wu Xiaolou. Back row (L-R): Zhang Guifeng, Xiao Dangui, Xu Yulan, and Yin Guifang.

Fan Ruijuan (Chinese: 范瑞娟; pinyin: Fàn Ruìjuān; 1924–2017) was a prominent Chinese opera singer. She was one of the stars of the Yue Opera which features actresses in male roles. She is remembered in particular for her many performances of Liang Shanbo in The Sad Story of Liang Shanbo and Zhu Yingtai, an opera based on the folk tale Butterfly Lovers, which she also played in the United States in 1989. In 1990, she toured widely in Europe. During a stage career lasting 50 years, she played over a hundred different roles, last performing in 1993 in a television series. She held various high-level official appointments including director of the Chinese Dramatists Association.

== Biography ==
Born on 6 January 1924 in Huangze, Sheng Country in central Zhejiang, Fu Ruijan began studying opera under Huang Bingwen at the Longfeng Stage School from the spring of 1935. Principally playing the parts of young males, she toured with the Longfeng troupe to Shaoxing, Ningbo and Zhuji. By 1938, she was performing in Shanghai with the Yuesheng Wutai Troupe.

She performed leading roles in the 1940s, joining the Siji Chun Troupe for a few months in late 1944, where she collaborated with Fu Quanxiang. From mid-1944, she worked with the dancer Yuan Xuefen and the musician Zhou Baocai, creating the xianxia qiang style for the deathbed scene in Liang Shanbo and Zhu Yingtai. She is remembered for performing in Xiang Lin's Wife, first on stage in May 1946 and in the 1948 film where she played the males roles of Young Master Niu and Xiang Lin.

For taking part in the benefit performance in Love for Mountains and Rivers (1948), Fan Ruijuan is remembered as one of the "ten sisters of yueju". At the request of the dramatist Tian Han, in 1950 she and her troupe performed Liang Shanbo and New Year's Sacrifice in Beijing for high-level officials including Mao Zedong, Zhou Enlai and Zhou Yang. In 1953, Liang Shanbo was released as a colour film starring Fan Ruijuan and Yuan Xuefen.

In the mid-1950s, Fan Ruijuan travelled to Europe, the Soviet Union before returning the Shanghai to work with the Shanghai Yueju Theatre. It is not known how she fared during the Cultural Revolution but she went on to perform in Song of the Loyal Souls, Southeastern Flight of the Peacock and The Story of Liwa. In 1988, she performed in Liang Shambo and The Story of Liwa in the United States. In early 1990, together with Lu Ruiying and Zhang Guifeng, she performed across western Europe in The Magic Needle.

Fan Ruijuan died in Shanghai on 17 February 2017, aged 93. In accordance with her wishes, there was no memorial service.
