= Bi Chunfang =

Chinese opera singer

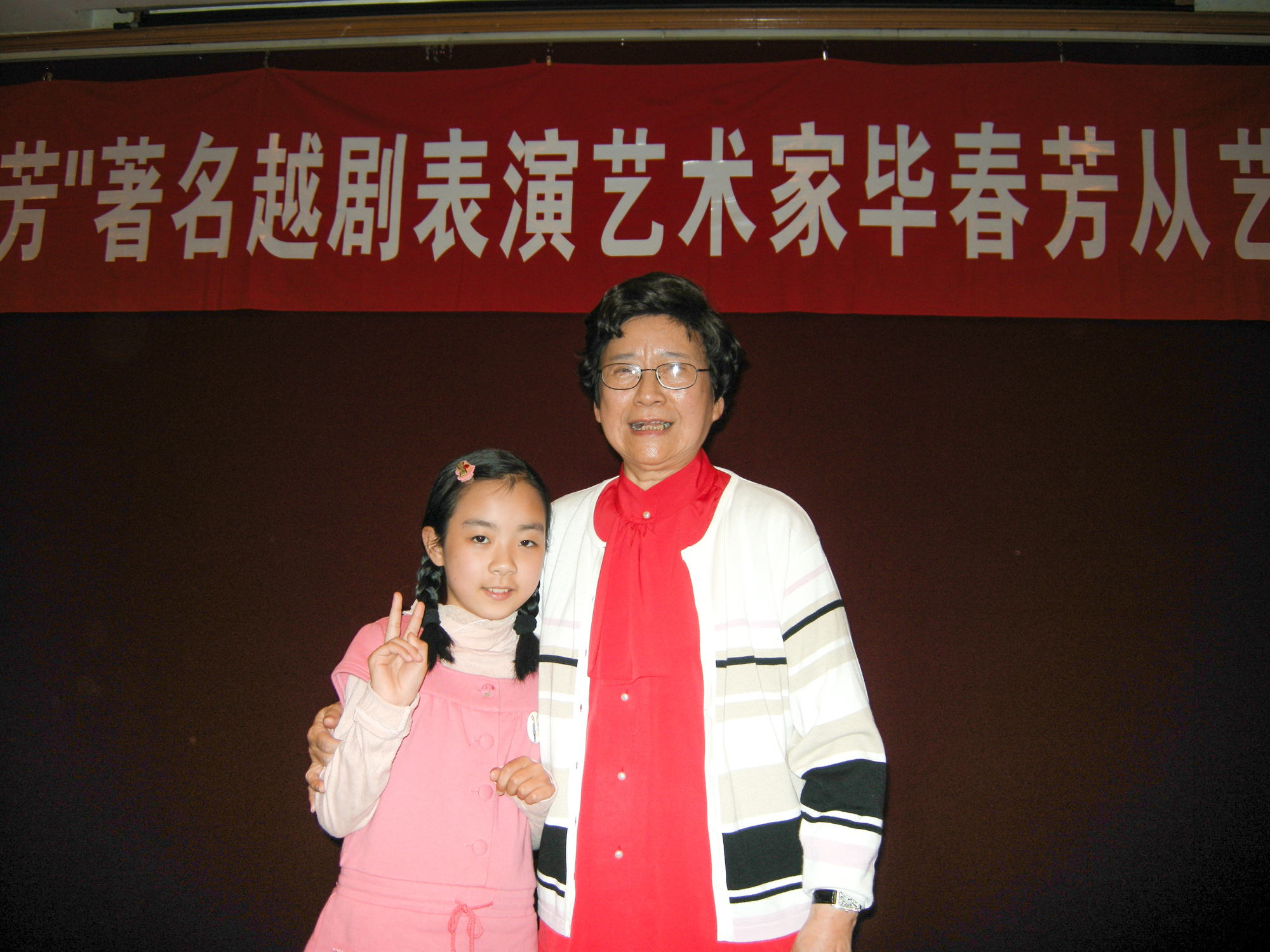
- Born: July 14, 1927 (age 98); Shanghai, China
- Died: 14 August 2016 (aged 89)
- Occupations: Yue Opera performer founder of Bi genre

Bi Chunfang (Chinese: 毕春芳; 14 July 1927 - 14 August 2016) was a Chinese Yue opera performer, known as the founder of the "Bi style" of Yue opera. Bi joined the Xuesheng troupe led by Yuan Xuefen in 1948, later joining the Dongshan troupe. A film was made about Bi's life in 1986.

== Biography ==
Born in Shanghai of Ningbo ancestry, Bi studied performing arts in Shanghai and after graduating in 1943 began her performing with Xu Tianhong and Wang Wenjuan, amongst others. She worked with several performing troupes, including the Tian Hong troupe, organised by Xu Tianhong, in 1946, the Xuesheng Troupe led by Yuan Xuefen in 1948 and the Dongshan Yue Opera troupe led by Fan Ruijuan and Fu Quanxiang in 1949. After joining the Hezuo Troupe in 1951 she partnered with Qi Yaxian.

Bi performed in Hong Kong five times between 1983 and 1989. She also performed in the USA in 1989.

A three-episode art film, based on Bi's story, won several awards in 1986.

Bi was hired as advisor to the Jing An Cultural Troupe after the intangible cultural heritage program was initiated.

=== Bi style ===
In Yue opera, female and male characters were traditionally all played by women, although there are several great male players now. Bi's style evolved to become one of the main genres of the young man's role in Yue opera.

=== Roles ===
Play	Character
A Bride for a Ride	Wenbin Zhou
The Story of Susan	Wang Jinlong
San Xiao	Tang Bohu
Legend of the White Snake	Xu Xian
Butterfly Lovers	Liang Shanbo
The Murder of the Murderers	Lin Zhaode

Other performances included:

- True Feelings Unbounded
- The Teacher's Diary
- She in the Rain
- The Murder of the Murderers
- The Bloody Handprint

== See also ==
- Zhejiang Yue Opera Troupe
