= Yulan Ji =

Ming dynasty play

- Original language: Chinese
- Characters: Carp Spirit; Zhang Zhen (張珍); Jin Mudan (金牡丹); Bao Zheng; Guanyin; Dragon King
- Genre: Supernatural, romance
- Setting: 11th-century Song dynasty

Yulan Ji
- Traditional Chinese: 觀音魚籃記
- Simplified Chinese: 观音鱼篮记
- Literal meaning: The Story of Guanyin and a Fish Basket
Transcriptions
Standard Mandarin
- Hanyu Pinyin: Guānyīn Yú Lán Jì

Guanyin Yulan Ji or simply Yulan Ji is a Ming dynasty play with 32 acts. The written version was first published by Wenlinge (文林閣), a Nanjing publisher owned by a Tang (唐) family during the Wanli era (1573–1615). Set in 11th-century Song dynasty, the play tells the story of a carp spirit seducing poor student Zhang Zhen by metamorphosing into a woman, who closely resembles Zhang Zhen's lover Jin Mudan. The goddess of mercy Guanyin, the Dragon King and the legendary judge Bao Zheng work together to subdue and capture the spirit in a fish basket carried by Guanyin.

== Modern versions ==
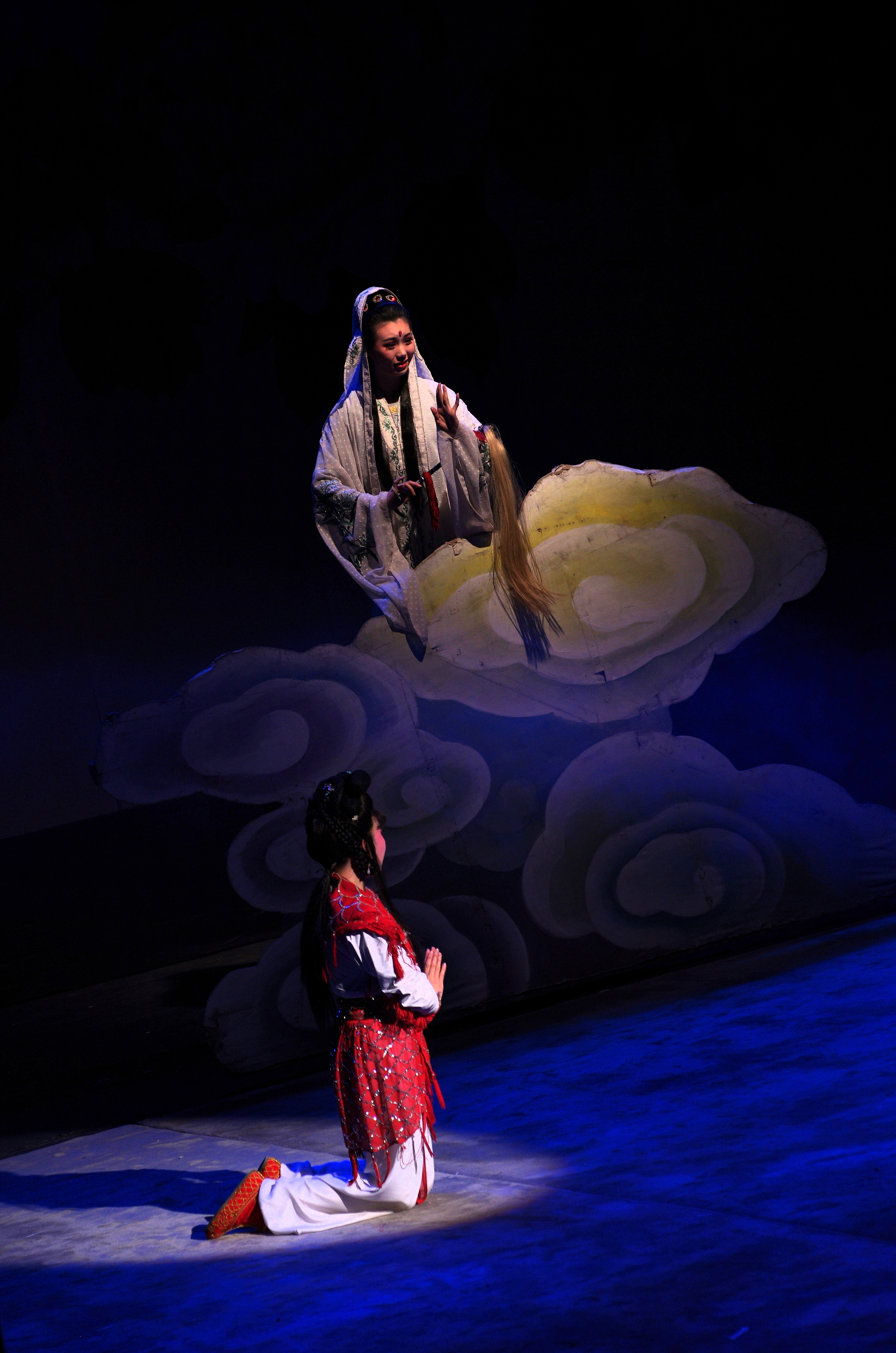
Carp spirit (bottom) chastised by Guanyin, from a 2014 Yue opera performance.

In the Yue opera tradition, the play is known as Zhuiyu (追魚, literally "Chasing the Fish"). In this version, Jin Mudan is a material girl while the carp spirit is kind. This version ends with Zhang Zhen's marriage to Carp Spirit instead of Jin Mudan.

In 1957, Tian Han and his wife wrote a modern version titled Jinlin Ji (金鱗記, literally "The story of Golden Fish Scales").

== Film and TV ==
The play has been adapted into numerous films and TV series, including:

=== Film ===
- The Carp Spirit (鯉魚精), a 1958 Hong Kong film starring Yam Kim-fai and Ng Kwan Lai
- Chasing the Fish (追魚), a 1959 Chinese film starring Wang Wenjuan and Xu Yulan
- A Mermaid's Love (碧波仙侶), a 1960 Hong Kong film starring Xia Meng and Fu Chi
- Golden Peony and Her Imposter (真假金牡丹), a 1965 Hong Kong film starring Tsang Shan Fung and Chan Chor Wai
- The Mermaid (魚美人), a 1965 Hong Kong film starring Li Ching and Ivy Ling Po

=== TV series ===
- Double Fantasies (無雙譜), a 1981 Hong Kong TV series starring Louise Lee and Kwan Chung
- Justice Pao (包青天), a 1993–94 Taiwanese TV series (Segment 31 "The Mermaid" which stars Chiu Yu-ting and Yang Ching-huang)
- The Legend of Mermaid (天地傳說之魚美人), a 2000 Chinese/Taiwanese TV series starring Yuki Hsu and Roger Kwok
- The Romance of a Carp Fairy (仙鯉奇緣), a 2002 Taiwanese TV series starring Chang Yu-yen and Jimmy Ni
- The Legend of Chasing Fish (追魚傳奇), a 2013 Chinese TV series starring Zhao Liying and Kenny Kwan
- Under the Veil (無雙譜), a 2015 Hong Kong TV series (Segment 3 "Chasing the Fish" which stars Eliza Sam and Bosco Wong)
