= Wang Jun'an =

- Born: June 5, 1970 (age 56); Sheng County, Zhejiang, China
- Other names: "White Horse" (白马; "Baima")
- Education: Catholic University of America
- Occupation: Yue opera performer
- Years active: 1986–1996, 2006–present
- Employer: Fujian Fanghua Yue Drama Troupe
- Known for: Young sheng roles
- Style: Yin (Yin Guifang) school
- Spouse: Andre Dehondt (m. 2014)

Chinese name
- Chinese: 王君安
Transcriptions
Standard Mandarin
- Hanyu Pinyin: Wáng Jūn'ān

Wang Jun'an (born 5 June 1970) is a Chinese Yue opera singer-actress who specializes in young sheng (male) roles. One of Yin Guifang's most prized students, she is the top star of the Fujian Fanghua Yue Drama Troupe based in Fuzhou. Wang Jun'an won the Plum Blossom Award in 2015 and the Magnolia Stage Award in 2014. She is affectionately nicknamed "White Horse" by her large fanbase, which "rival[s] that of a famous pop star".

Rare for a traditional Chinese opera performer, Wang Jun'an received her college education in the west — she holds a degree in economics and financial management from the Catholic University of America and lived for a decade in the U.S. before returning to China. In 2014–15 she became an artist in residence for the Five College Consortium and gave lectures at Mount Holyoke College, Amherst College, and Harvard University.

== Repertoire (incomplete) ==
English title	Original title	Role	Notes
Liu Yong	柳永	Liu Yong	
Interrogating the Wife and Seeking Her Return	盤妻索妻	Liang Yushu	
Dream of the Red Chamber	紅樓夢	Jia Baoyu	
Jade Dragonfly	玉蜻蜓	Shen Guisheng; Shen Shixing	
Liu Yi Delivers the Letter	柳毅傳書	Liu Yi	
The Legend of Song Hong	宋弘傳奇	Song Hong	
He Wenxiu	何文秀	He Wenxiu	
The Peony Pavilion	牡丹亭	Liu Mengmei	
