= Wang Kui Betrays Guiying =

Chinese story

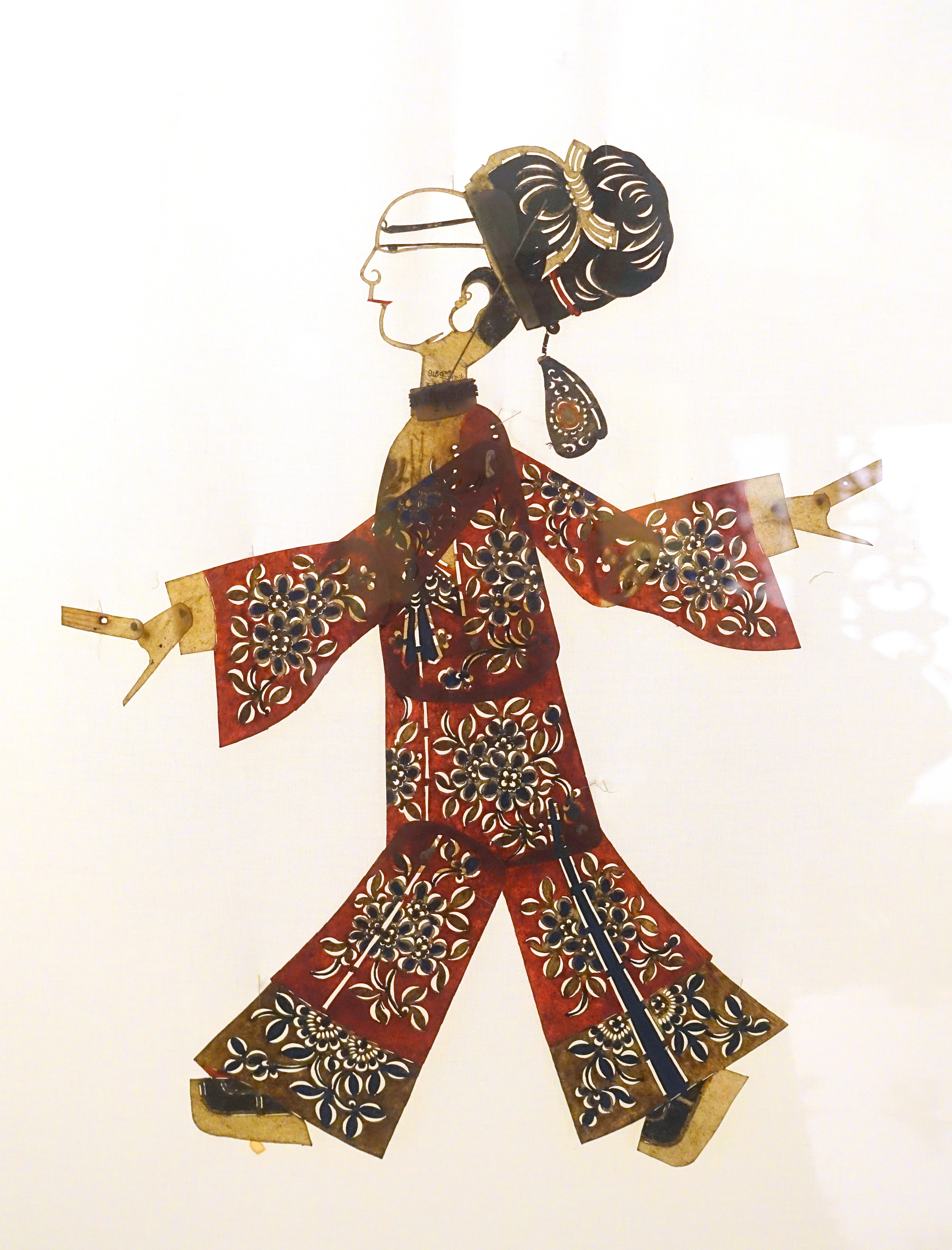
A shadow puppet depicting Jiao Guiying, from the Qing dynasty. Collection of Sichuan Provincial Museum.

Wang Kui Betrays Guiying (王魁負桂英) is a Chinese story dating from the 11th-century Song dynasty. The story was apparently quite popular by the 13th century (late Song dynasty and early Yuan dynasty) and is still a favorite among Chinese opera enthusiasts.

The male protagonist Wang Kui (王魁) was either based on or created to slander Wang Junmin (1035–1063), who finished first in the 1061 imperial examination but almost immediately developed a mental illness and died 2 years later while in office. Kui means champion in Chinese.

The story that began to circulate after his somewhat baffling death goes something like this: A young Gējì named Jiao Guiying (敫桂英 or 焦桂英) falls in love with an impoverished student named Wang Kui, and supports him with her savings as he prepares for the imperial examination. Wang Kui promises her that once he succeeds in the examination held in the capital Kaifeng, he would immediately fetch her. After finishing first in the examination and becoming the talk of the capital, he cruelly writes Guiying a letter telling her that he now plans to marry a high-ranking minister's daughter. When Guiying receives his letter, she commits suicide. Her ghost then wanders from the Underworld to Wang Kui's residence, where she haunts him and later captures and drags him to Hell.

Somewhat different versions of the story exist.

== English translations ==
- "Broken Promises: Wang Kui Betrays Guiying and Is Repaid with Death" (translated by Alister D. Inglish), in The Drunken Man's Talk: Tales from Medieval China
- "The Tale of Wang Kui" (translated by Zhenjun Zhang and Jing Wang), in Song Dynasty Tales: A Guided Reader

== Modern adaptations ==
=== Film ===
- A Scholar's Adventure (王魁與桂英), a 1952 Hong Kong film starring Ouyang Sha-fei as Jiao Guiying
- A Torn Lily (孽海花), a 1953 Hong Kong film starring Xia Meng as Jiao Guiying and Ping Fan as Wang Kui
- A Test of Love (情探), a 1958 Chinese film starring Fu Quanxiang as Jiao Guiying and Lu Jinhua as Wang Kui
- Butterfly Couple (彩蝶雙飛), a 1959 Hong Kong anthology film (the story "Beating the Spirit" 打神 stars Hung Sin-nui as Jiao Guiying)
- Tears of a Prostitute (煙花淚), a 1988 Chinese film starring Ren Genxin as Jiao Guiying

=== TV series ===
- Chinese Folklore (民間傳奇), a 1974–77 Hong Kong TVB series (the 1975 segment "The Story of Burning Incense" 焚香記 stars Sylvia Lai as Jiao Guiying)
- A Flower in a Sinful Sea (孽海花), a 1995 Taiwanese China Television series starring Angie Chiu as Jiao Guiying and Cecilia Yip as Wang Kui (in a cross-gender role)
