= Two Stage Sisters =

1964 film directed by Xie Jin

- Film poster

Chinese name
- Traditional Chinese: 舞臺姐妹
- Simplified Chinese: 舞台姐妹
Transcriptions
Standard Mandarin
- Hanyu Pinyin: Wǔtái Jiěmèi
- Directed by: Xie Jin
- Written by: Lin Gu; Xu Jin; Xie Jin
- Produced by: Ding Li
- Starring: Xie Fang; Cao Yindi; Shangguan Yunzhu
- Cinematography: Zhou Daming; Chen Zhenxiang
- Edited by: Zhang Liqun
- Music by: Huang Zhun
- Release date: 1964
- Running time: 114 minutes
- Country: China
- Languages: Mandarin; Wu Chinese

Two Stage Sisters is a 1964 Chinese drama film produced by Shanghai Tianma Film Studio and directed by Xie Jin, starring Xie Fang and Cao Yindi. Made just before the Cultural Revolution, it tells the story of two female Yue opera practitioners from the same troupe who end up taking very different paths in their lives: "one succumbs to bourgeois affluence and privilege, while the other finds inspiration and fulfilment in the social commitment associated with the May Fourth movement and the thought of Lu Xun." The film documents their journey through abusive feudal conditions in the countryside before achieving success and prestige on the stage, meanwhile historically following Shanghai's experience under Japanese and KMT rule.

This original screenplay depicts the socio-political changes encompassing China from 1935 to 1950 (just after the founding of New China) through the theatrical world of Shaoxing, and accordingly mixes both a Chinese aesthetic with Hollywood and socialist realist forms. The main protagonist (Zhu Chunhua) is said to be based on the life of Xie Jin's friend and opera-veteran Yuan Xuefen.

== Plot ==
In 1935, Zhu Chunhua, a young child-bride tongyangxi turned child-widow, takes refuge with an itinerant Yue Opera troupe (the Yangchun Theatre Troupe) performing in a Shaoxing village while fleeing her in-laws, who are actively attempting to sell her off for financial gain following her husband's death. As film scholar Gina Marchetti argues, this narrative catalyst highlights the brutal commodification of women within the traditional feudal patriarchal structure, establishing Chunhua's initial escape not merely as a flight from domestic hardship, but as a desperate bid for bodily autonomy. The head of the troupe, A'Xin, intends to send the girl away, but Yue Opera teacher Xing, seeing her potential, takes Chunhua in as a disciple and trains her. Chunhua signs a deal with the troupe and becomes the performing partner (in a dan role) to the teacher's daughter Yuehong, the latter performing as a xiaosheng.

A rich provincial landlord Ni invites Chunhua and Yuehong to sing at his house privately after the troupe reaches his province. He takes an interest in Yuehong; however, Yuehong and her father spurn his interest and as a result, Kuomintang cops forcibly seize Yuehong one day during a performance. Chunhua is also arrested and tied to a pillar for days as "public humiliation". The two are released after Xing and A'Xin send bribes to the KMT cops.

During the Second Sino-Japanese War, Yuehong, Chunhua and the troupe go through hard times. In 1941, Teacher Xing dies of an illness, and troupe master A'Xin sells his two best performers to Tang, a Shanghai opera theater manager, on a three-year contract. Yuehong and Chunhua, now sworn sisters, rapidly become Tang's biggest stars, causing Tang to forsake his aging star and former lover, Shang Shuihua.

Three years elapse. Yuehong and Chunhua are renowned in the city. Chunhua remains down-to-earth but Yuehong grows steadily more materialistic. Sick of having to sing opera for life, Yuehong rashly agrees to Tang's proposal, but Chunhua distrusts Tang and refuses to support Yuehong's marriage plans. Unbeknownst to Yuehong, Tang already has a wife, and is keeping her as a mistress.

One day faded ex-star Shang commits suicide by hanging herself. Chunhua is incensed that Tang, her former lover, attempts to shirk his responsibilities by claiming he has nothing to do with her death. Through this episode, Chunhua gets to know a "radical" lady journalist Jiang Bo (a female communist reporter investigating the death), who advises her to become "progressive" to teach other Chinese to distinguish between truth and falsehood. She starts performing "progressive" operas like an adaptation of Lu Xun's "The New Year's Sacrifice" in an attempt to politicize the work of the troupe, whose production consequently gets banned.

Chunhua's works alert the KMT regime who gives Tang the task to ruin Chunhua's reputation. They get A'Xin to file a lawsuit against Chunhua and Manager Tang coerces Yuehong to testify against Chunhua, but at the crucial moment in the courtroom, Yuehong faints.

The film ends in 1950, one year after the establishment of the People's Republic of China. Chunhua prepares to perform The White-Haired Girl for country folks at Zhejiang. Tang has run off to Taiwan with the KMT cohort and Yuehong is quietly abandoned at Shaoxing province. Although Yuehong witnesses Chunhua's drama, she is too ashamed to face her sworn sister again. Near a quay later the day, however, the sisters manage a tearful reunion. On the boat the following day, Yuehong vows to learn her lesson and walk the "correct" path while Chunhua dedicates her entire life to performing revolutionary operas.

== Cast ==
- Xie Fang as Zhu Chunhua (竺春花), the main protagonist, a Yue Opera performer. Originally a tongyangxi, she is adopted and later excelled in the dan role. Chunhua's political awakening is influenced by journalist Jiang Bo. Shortly after their meeting, she begins staging politically conscious operas for rural audiences following the founding of the People's Republic of China.
- Cao Yindi as Xing Yuehong (邢月红), daughter of Teacher Xing. She plays the xiaosheng (male) parts. Enticed by Manager Tang to forsake her art, but is abused frequently until reunited with sworn sister, Chunhua.
- Feng Qi as Teacher Xing (邢师傅), father of Yuehong, a Yue Opera teacher.
- Gao Yuan-sheng as Jiang Bo (江波), a female reporter and member of the Chinese Communist Party.
- Shen Fengjuan as Xiaoxiang (小香), a former troupe performer who plays supporting roles. Later reunited with Chunhua.
- Xu Caigen as Jinshui (金水), Xiaoxiang's husband and former troupe member.
- Shangguan Yunzhu as Shang Shuihua (商水花), an aging former star in the Shanghai opera scene, a former mistress of Manager Tang who was jilted. She later hangs herself.
- Ma Ji as Qian Dakui (钱大奎), a Yue performer at the Shanghai theater
- Luo Jingyi as Yu Guiqing (俞桂卿), a Yue performer at the Shanghai theater
- Wu Bofang as Little Chunhua (小春花), a village tongyangxi who is Chunhua's namesake.
- Li Wei as Manager Tang (唐经理), the unscrupulous manager and theater owner who keeps Shang and Yuehong as his mistresses.
- Deng Nan as A'xin the "Monk" (和尚阿鑫), the former troupe owner, a not-so-educated boor who will do anything for money.
- Shen Hao as Mrs Shen (沈家姆妈), a wealthy heiress who tries to adopt Chunhua and has illicit dealings with Manager Tang.
- Dong Lin as Third Master Ni (倪三老爷), a provincial landlord who tries to take Yuehong for sexual favors.
- Ding Ran as Commissioner Pan (潘委员), a Kuomintang official intent on ruining Chunhua and her revolutionary opera troupe.

== Background and cultural contexts ==
=== Cultural Revolution and censorship ===
Xia Yan, Vice Minister of Culture when the film was made, had made script corrections and encouraged Xie Jin to shoot the film. Xia Yan was particularly disliked by Mao's wife, Jiang Qing, and thus Two Stage Sisters is argued to have stood out for censure due to its association with Yan.

The film was caught in the escalating ideological purges leading up to the Cultural Revolution. Jiang Qing, Mao Zedong's wife and a key architect of the Cultural Revolution, personally labeled *Two Stage Sisters* a "poisonous weed" (毒草). It was aggressively attacked by radical leftists and banned from public screens for fifteen years.

The primary ideological denunciation against the film was that it "advocated the reconciliation of social classes" (阶级调和论) rather than reflecting absolute class struggle. Critics argued that the film softened class conflict by portraying certain antagonistic or bourgeois characters with human complexity, which violated the rigid codes of socialist realism. Additionally, the film was condemned for portraying and condoning "bourgeois" values through Yuehong's succumbing to luxury in Shanghai, and Xie Jin was forced to alter parts of the script during production under intense political pressure before the film was ultimately withdrawn from circulation.

The narrative tracking of the protagonists' encounter with left-wing journalism mirrors the historical alignment of urban cultural workers with the Communist underground in 1940s Shanghai. In Xie's depiction, the communist state becomes the inheritor of the leftist realist tradition, but Xie Jin knew the reality was otherwise. In other words, "drama and film could no longer remain truly realist under the communist regime." Accordingly, instead of having the two stage sisters reunite in the "new society" which would allow them to perform Opera with full devotion and creative freedom as Xie Jin wanted, he was forced to work within the restraints of the censorships of the time and instead have Chunhua encourage Yuehong to become a revolutionary and to perform revolutionary-focused plays.

=== Chinese opera ===
Two Stage Sisters demonstrates director Xie's keen interest in traditional Chinese opera art, which he had studied during the Japanese Occupation at the Jiangen Drama Academy. He had then worked with well-known opera practitioners such as Huang Zuoling and Zhang Junxiang.

Regarding the stage sisters themselves, some forms of Chinese opera troupes during this time were made up of artists mostly in one gender only. This was due to the strict fengjian taboo which forbade men and women to appear together on stage as romantic leads. This norm is still the case in more traditional Chinese opera troupes performing in mainland China, Taiwan or Hong Kong. This phenomenon also explains why most huangmeidiao movies feature women in male roles (e.g. Ivy Ling Po).

Chinese opera is built around four fundamental role categories – the painted face, the clown, and the female and male roles – each with its own codified performance vocabulary. The film portrays Zhu Chunhua who performs in the dan role, representing the female lead, and Yuehong who performs in the xiaosheng (小生) role, representing the young male lead. In Yue opera, it is standard practice for women to perform xiaosheng roles. These roles typically encompass an actress flourishing large pheasant tail feathers on the headdress to communicate shifting emotional states, such as attentive listening or surprise. The pairing of Chunhua's dan with Yuehong's xiaosheng mirrors the complementary couple structure built into Chinese opera's role system.

Crucially, this enforced segregation inadvertently opened up a powerful arena for gender subversion. The all-female nature of mid-century Yue Opera troupes allowed these actresses to subvert traditional feudal patriarchal boundaries by having women control both the active male (Xiaosheng) and female (dan) subjectivities on stage. As Meenakshi S. Thambi argues in her analysis of the film's aesthetic reinvention, by including both halves of the theatrical romance, these performers reclaimed agency over how gender and authority were represented, transforming a restrictive feudal isolation into a space of female rights.

== Symbolism ==
=== Setting ===
After World War II, Shanghai once again fell under the control of the Kuomintang. The turmoil within the theatrical world symbolizes the bitter political struggles between the Communists and the Nationalists. Some of the changes in the theatrical world reflect the momentous changes that were transforming China at this time.

James Wicks stated that "The film's use of setting is similar to pre-1949 Shanghai films: spatial geography becomes a powerful force in the construction of class identity, and the division between the rural and the urban takes on moral connotations." Shanghai was often seen during the early days of the PRC as a symbol of the bourgeois decadence and as such, is seen as the ideal venue to depict the stage sisters' struggles later in life.

=== The drama-within-a-drama device ===
Director Xie Jin harnesses a sophisticated "drama-within-a-drama" technique by embedding four distinct, real-world historical Yue Opera segments directly into the narrative of Two Stage Sisters. Rather than serving as mere ornamental entertainment or background spectacle, these carefully ordered theatrical pieces act as vital structural and thematic markers. As the narrative progresses, the embedded opera pieces intentionally shift across genres: moving from traditional premodern plays to modernized, revolutionary forms. This structural trajectory showcases the characters' and the nation's broader sociopolitical evolution, mapping out a distinct shift where performance transitions from a tool of commercial entertainment under feudalism/capitalism to a sharp political weapon for revolutionary awakening.

=== Yuan Xuefen (袁雪芬) ===
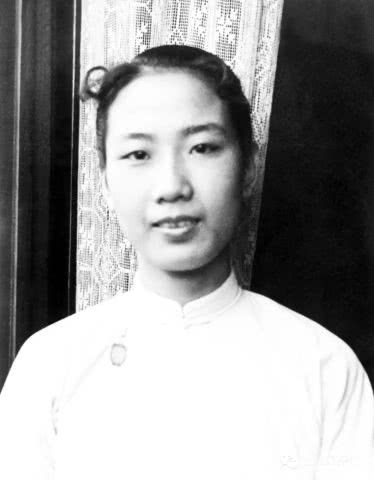
Yuan Xuefen, the opera expert on whom the character Zhu Chunhua is based and to whom the film pays homage

Yuan Xuefen, a friend of director Xie Jin, and one of the world's most renowned Shaoxing Opera experts, is argued to be the "real life prototype" of Zhu Chunhua's character in the film. She also served as a consultant on the film. After the film was banned, Yuan received immense scrutiny and was targeted during the Cultural Revolution for her participation in the film's production. This was likely because "some of her undertakings inadvertently coincided with the interests of the left, such as her staging of Sister Xianglin and her refusal to be involved with the Yue Opera Workers' Union, which was sanctioned by the Nationalist Social Affairs Bureau." However, she stated that she did not act out of political motivation until after the liberation of China in 1949.

The film's other two characters, Xing Yuehong and Shang Shuihua, are also said to be loosely based on Ma Zhanghua (Yuan's real-life stage sister) and Xiao Dangui ("Queen of Yueju"), who in reality suffered at the hands of their theatre bosses. "All these actresses, including Yuan's famous 'ten sisters' of yueju in 1940s Shanghai alluded to in the film, were Shengxian orphans, child brides, or poverty-stricken country urchins sold to country troupes to seek a living in the theater."

== Socio-political commentary ==
This backstage melodrama is about a Shaoxing opera rising from an itinerant small-town theater to Shanghai celebrity, a metaphor for the changes sweeping across China in the decades before the founding of People's Republic of China. By creating a duality between the aesthetic of the film and that of the fictional theatre world, Xie Jin structured Two Stage Sisters to mimic a Chinese opera performance; "Its episodic narrative structure, for example, relies on often disjointed, autonomous sequences to give it a sweeping scope and an ability to deal with all aspects of society." The different historical, political, and social events depicted onstage in the theatre thus are intended to act as a microcosm for Chinese society as itself. The depiction of an "actress [bearing] hardship and [resisting] the corruption of a rotten society, [and] coming to understand that her performance on the small stage is related to changing the bigger stage, that of society itself," is deployed to convey national sentiments of the time of political consciousness.

Xie Jin uses Chunhua's suffering to represent his own opinions about the KMT's political reign at this time. Another example of using Chunhua to convey political commentary is at the end of the film when Chunhua's state drama troupe revisits the same town that used to be corrupt and a site where she was punished. The film is filled with commentary on the change from the old to the new society through the personal dramas of the stage sisters which parallel the theatrical plays they act in order to represent the political changes occurring in China at this time.

The opera star Shangguan Yunzhu excellently plays the character of Shang Shuihua who commits suicide in the film. Four years after the film's production, due to the obscure circumstances stemming from the Cultural Revolution, actress Shangguan Yunzhu tragically died by suicide as well. This incident inadvertently ties Xie Jin's film deeper into exposing the hardships of the Cultural Revolution, as Shangguan's death was caused largely by the harsh persecution she faced for being deemed a counter-revolutionary.

== Reception and criticism ==
Two Stage Sisters is widely regarded by critics as one of director Xie Jin's finest works. The film was heavily criticized during the Cultural Revolution for depicting "bourgeois" values through Zhu Yuehong who succumbs to capitalist and Western lifestyle. Since the late 1970s, both the director and the film have been reassessed and rehabilitated as a landmark of socialist cinema and has circulated widely on the international festival circuit, winning the Sutherland Trophy of the British Film Institute Awards at the 24th (1980) London Film Festival, amongst other international prizes.

=== Critical reviews ===
Today, Two Stage Sisters is considered by some to be Xie Jin's masterpiece. Many critics find a Hollywood melodrama flavor to the movie, while Gina Marchetti notes an indebtedness to Soviet social realism. Summing up the film, Marchetti concludes:

...more than simply documenting aesthetic and social changes by incorporating these opera allusions, Two Stage Sisters chronicles its own roots, giving the viewer a rare glimpse of the history behind Chinese film aesthetics of the mid-1960s. It is as a document of this unique Chinese socialist cinematic sensibility that Two Stage Sisters is particularly important to an understanding of Chinese film culture as well as socialist cinema aesthetics in general.

Marchetti also asserts Xie Jin's emphasis on rooting this film in a historical period:

Although epic in scope like traditional opera, Two Stage Sisters also has the chamber quality of a literature influenced by Ibsen and Western critical realism. Jiang Bo cooks rice that boils over as she discusses sexism, class differences, and the theater with Chunhua. A montage sequence shows the daily routine of the traveling troupe from calisthenics for martial roles to memorizing lines while walking from town to town. This attention to what may appear to be nearly irrelevant detail creates a sense of the particularity of the social fabric, a concrete feeling for the historical period, as it does in the best of critical realism globally."

Gilbert Adair gave the film a glowing review on Time Out magazine:

The performances are terrific, but what really distinguishes this amazing hybrid (in Western terms, that is) is the director's fluid and elegant style. Colour, composition, pace, and above all, camera movement, create an exhilarating spectacle that is never thematically shallow. Imagine Sirk's colours and emotional sense, Scorsese or Minnelli's craning camera shots, allied to a politically perceptive treatment, and you're half way to imagining this film."

Mike Hale, writing in The New York Times, was receptive and applauds Xie Jin for his resourcefulness:

Two Stage Sisters ... is unexpectedly fluid and subtle, with emotions that ring true. It's also a sweeping, ambitious narrative that moves from the provinces to the theater district of Shanghai and back again. Some cramped staging may reflect a lack of resources, but Mr. Xie's technical assurance and the overall level of the acting are the equal of at least a modest Hollywood drama of the 1950s or '60s."

J. Hoberman of The Village Voice said that "as one sister moves left and the other right, the parallels with Chen Kaige's 1992 Farewell My Concubine are obvious."

Steve Jenkins on behalf of the Monthly Film Bulletin commends Xie Jin's genre-defying work:

... while Two Stage Sisters successfully embraces many of the staple elements of Western melodrama (central female characters, the corrupting influence of the city as opposed to the country, the courtroom climax), it also demands, through its rejection of transcendence, a redefinition of genre." Stage Sisters remains a remarkable historical document to this day because it encapsulates a compelling effort to satisfy the contradictory requirements of state propaganda, classical Hollywood narrative continuity, and Soviet socialist realism.

He also voices public opinion over the film's controversial portrayal of historic events:

Many articles in The People's Daily condemned the film because of its sympathetic portrayals of the bourgeoisie and its incongruence with Mao's expectations for art. Specifically, Xie Jin was accused of employing the critical realist tradition of the 1930s rather than using the state-approved style of "revolutionary realism and revolutionary romanticism."" as congruent with Dong's (1966) argument."

== 4K restoration in 2014 ==
In 2014, the film underwent a six-month 4K restoration at L'Immagine Ritrovata Film Restoration Laboratory in Bologna, Italy. The restored film opened the 2014 Shanghai International Film Festival at the city's Daguangming Grand Theatre, with the lead actresses in attendance.
