= A Test of Love (1958 film) =

1958 Chinese Yue opera film

A Test of Love is a 1958 Chinese Yue opera film directed by Huang Zumo and starring Fu Quanxiang, Lu Jinhua, and other performers of the Shanghai Yue Opera House. The script of the film, as well as that of the stage production on which the film is based, was written by Tian Han with his wife An E and based on the Wang Kui Betrays Guiying legend from the Song dynasty.
