= A Test of Love =

A Test of Love may refer to:

- Annie's Coming Out, also known as A Test of Love, a 1984 Australian drama film
- A Test of Love (1958 film), a Chinese Yue opera film

== See also ==
- The Test of Love, a 1999 American television drama film
