= The New Year's Sacrifice =

Short novel written by Lu Xun

- Short story by Lu Xun
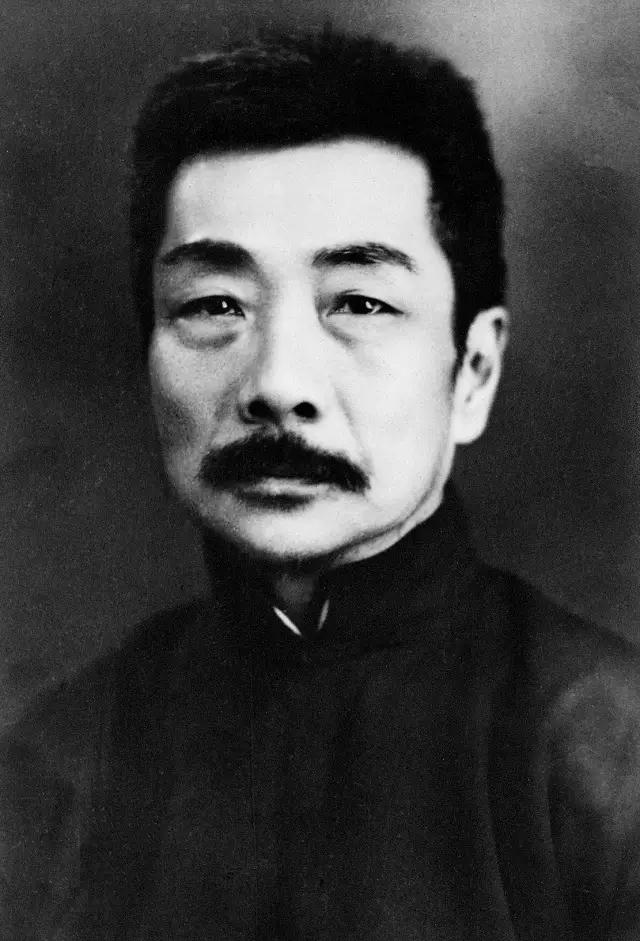
- Lu Xun in 1933

Text available at Wikisource

Text available at Chinese Wikisource
- Original title: 祝福
- Country: Republic of China (1912–1949)
- Language: Chinese

Publication
- Published in: Oriental Magazine
- Publication date: March 25, 1924

"The New Year's Sacrifice" (祝福) is a short story by Lu Xun, originally published in Oriental Magazine, Volume 21, Number 6 (March 25, 1924). It was later compiled in Lu Xun's second collection of short stories, Wandering.

It narrates a story of a woman who lives a tragic life that eventually forces her to the fringes of societal moral standards. The story is a way for motivating social changes. It has distinctive consideration to women's dilemma by taking into account women's liberty concepts. The story, which occurred during the early era of the 1911 revolution, is a religious ceremony that occurs on the impressionable New Year's Day in China.

== Plot ==
"The New Year's Sacrifice" tells the story of a 25-year-old widowed woman who works as a house servant. Hardworking, she thrives in her current home specifically at the time of the sacrifice. On a fateful day, her former mother-in-law orchestrates her kidnapping, and is returned to her natal village located in the mountains. Her family takes away her earnings, and forces her to marry a man from a rural region. She fights against the marriage, as she is accustomed to life in an educated household.

Eventually, she surrenders and a year later appears satisfied with her life and newborn son. She returns to the house of the educated man after the deaths of her son and husband. Since she is considered unlucky, she is faced with apprehension and forbidden from touching the sacrifice regalia due to the fear of aggravating ancestors. This stigmatisation disturbs her. She also faces ridicule for allowing her son to die. Later, someone informs her that she will face punishment in the afterlife as her deceased husbands will tear her apart by fighting for her.

People stipulate that marrying more than once is a crime and that the only way of atoning for this crime is by contributing money to the threshold of the temple. To avoid the punishment, she complies and donates all her savings to meet the threshold. However, despite her effort to make amends for her sins, she still faces discrimination. She is prevented from participating in the sacrifice ceremony and becomes upset. Believing that she was purified, she is finally let go. She becomes a beggar and on New Year's Sacrifice's eve, she dies of poverty amidst the explosions of firecrackers.

== Characters ==
Xiang Lin's wife

Xiang Lin's wife is a hard-working, kind, and humble widow who works as a maidservant in the Lu family. Her two marriages ended in the loss of her husbands, and even her son was tragically taken away and eaten by a wolf. She also struggled and resisted during the period of 1911 Revolution dominated by feudal thinking and rituals, but eventually succumbed to the ruthless and repressive society that ended her life with despair.

Mr. Lu

Mr. Lu is a typical intellectual of the landlord class. He is pedantic, conservative and stubborn, opposes all reforms and revolutions. He also honours the science of reasoning and the teachings of Confucius and Mencius, and consciously defends the feudal system and rites. He is selfish and hypocritical, and spiritually persecutes Xiang Lin's wife.

Mrs. Lu

Mrs. Lu is a woman who plans everything carefully. She decides to keep Xiang Lin's wife after seeing enough evidence of her advantages. Mrs. Lu only cares about Xiang Lin's wife because she treats her as a labor force for her own use. She has always regarded Xiang Lin's wife as a tool. When Xiang Lin's wife started to show declining in work, Mrs. Lu kicks her out of the house after showing a series of “dissatisfaction” and “warnings”.

Old Mrs. Wei

Old Mrs. Wei serves as a dominant link between Xiang Lin's wife and other characters of the short story. She has a clear view of the living conditions of women of all social classes under the constraints of feudalism. She is able to see the destinies and the final destinations of all women around her.

Mother-in-law

Xiang Lin's mother-in-law is very selfish and cruel, she executes her plan for her own benefit. She sells and remarries her daughter-in-law to gain profit for herself. She also treats Xiang Lin's wife as a money-making tool in which she took all the salaries Xiang Lin's wife has earned from Mr. Lu.

Liu Ma

Liu Ma is introduced as “a devout woman who abstained from meat, did not kill living things”. She has a friendly appearance of a woman, but deep inside she is very cruel to Xiang Lin's wife. Liu Ma and Xiang Lin's wife have many common in their past experiences. Nonetheless, she showed her only indifference and ridicule that she makes fun of Xiang Lin's wife and exposes her scars. It is to be said that the mental damage and pressure Liu Ma has done further led to Xiang Lin's wife's death.

I (The Narrator)

“I”, an enlightenment intellectual who is alienated from Mr. Lu and resentful of the conservative and indifferent social atmosphere of Luzhen. Although he is strengthless to save Xiang Lin's wife, he is the only person who deeply sympathizes with her tragic fate. The narrator is a representation of the new party member with a sense of justice and awareness.

== Themes ==
The New Year's Sacrifice story chronicles the distressing story of a woman who deals with difficult circumstances in her life and illustrates how it impacts her all through her ensuing years. The harrowing events that occurred earlier in her life and the profane comments from the individuals in her society caused her to be fearful of what would occur when she died.

== Literary structure ==
=== Story structure ===
The story uses a unique narrative structure. It begins with the return of the narrator, "I", to his hometown from a first-person point of view. Then continuing to borrow the oral narratives of “I” and other characters to present the fragmentary recollections, thus constituting the main narrative structure of the short story. This traditional narrative structure mode plays a reference value for the promotion of the vernacular stories and provides a new enlightenment for the structure mode of contemporary short stories.

=== Literary devices ===
From the choice of the title of the novel to the design of the characters in the work, Lu Xun skillfully mixed detailed writing, short writing and free writing, highlighting the character image and highlighting the theme of the story in a casual nature.

Lu Xun used detailed writing to depict and describe the important characters and events in his works. Detailed writing is to strive to write in detail, full, vivid. In the detailed description, repeated contrast can make the image of the character more three-dimensional full, deepen the impression of the reader. In order to highlight the tragic life of Xiang Lin's wife and highlight the theme of the article, Lu Xun focused on the character image of Xiang Lin's wife in a real and vivid way. Lu Xun narrated the tragic experience of Xiang Lin's wife's son Amao being carried away by a Wolf twice, although the content is almost exactly the same, but the repeated narration and detailed description more vividly shows the pain of her son's loss. In the detailed and plain narration of “The New Year’s Sacrifice”, the meaning is not spoken, but the meaning is manifested; The expression is not displayed, but the emotion is shown; There is no irony, but irony has been fully revealed, which is the unique charm of Lu Xun's works.

Proper short writing has the beauty of less is more, simple words and abundant meaning, and infinite meaning. In "The New Year’s Sacrifice", there are many secondary characters, they are not the focus of the article, the author did not describe them in detail, but with a simple outline and light narration, inadvertently portrayed the character image. For the characters such as Mrs. Lu and Xiang Lin's wife's mother-in-law, Liu Ma, the author also uses this kind of concise description technique to display Xiang Lin's wife's tragic fate. Lu Xun used concise words to show a profound and rich expression effect, which not only revealed the relationship between the characters, wrote the internal subtle psychology of the characters, but also highlighted the inevitability of Xiang Lin's wife's tragic fate, which can be described as simple and realistic.

=== Luzhen ===
In Lu Xun's, stories, Luzhen represents the world of the masses and the epitomizes the society of rural China at that time. All the people in Luzhen, including Mr. Lu have not changed at all. All of them believe in ghosts and gods, follow the traditional customs, obey the rituals, and are in a state of numbness. Xiang Lin's wife's fate is to a large extent an inevitable one. When Xiang Lin's wife tells her own tragic story, at first people will redden their eyes and shed tears, but later they will gradually turn to despise or even spit on her, without any sympathy. Throughout the short story, the mass world represented by Luzhen shows selfishness and indifference to the fullest. When Xiang Lin's wife first flees to Luzhen, Mr. Lu takes her in as a laborer is simply because she is more diligent and stronger. When Xiang Lin's wife returned to Luzhen, she was no longer as agile as before, and her memory was not so good. Mrs. Lu became dissatisfied with this that she finally sidelined Xiang Lin's wife to the fringe of the world.

== Educational impact ==
=== The Experimental Reform Stage (1978-1986) ===
In 1980, Chinese classes must provide ideological and political education in addition to reading and writing training. Shi Yanxing summarized the theme of “The New Year’s Sacrifice” as a profound revelation of the cruel spiritual destruction of working women by feudalism and the landlord class, a criticism of the weakness and compromise of the 1911 Revolution, and a powerful stimulus to the spirit of anti-imperialism and anti-feudalism.

=== The Stage of Deepening Reform (1986-1992) ===
The reform of Chinese education went deeper, and the syllabus of 1980 was revised in 1986 and 1990, and the teaching reference book published by the People's Education Press in 1990 summarized the theme as follows: "The New Year’s Sacrifice" reflects the social contradictions in China after the 1911 Revolution through the tragic life of Xiang Lin's wife, and profoundly exposes the destruction and persecution of the landlord class against working women, and reveals the feudalistic etiquette of “eating people”.

=== The Stage of Reflection and Reform (1992-2000) ===
The new syllabus in 1992 stipulated that reading should be based on the content of the text to realize the author's feelings and position, and to put forward students’ own ideas or questions based on the content, language, and writing style of the text. Chinese course emphasized more on students' individual experience, and the lessons reflected diversified interpretations.

=== Later Stage (2000–present) ===
In 2004, the textbook adopted by the preliminary review set "The New Year’s Sacrifice" in the first unit of the third book, and with a strong humanitarian sympathy, focused the theme on the survival rights of the toiling masses at the bottom of the Chinese society. "The New Year’s Sacrifice" is based on the working women of the lower class, depicts the unfortunate fate of Xiang Lin's wife, who is shackled by the feudal superstitious ideology, and profoundly exposes the corruption and backwardness of the Chinese feudal society, which distinctly embodies stories’ expression of the aspirations of Lu Xun.

== Story in translation ==
There are two versions of Yang's translation of Lu Xun's novel "The New Year’s Sacrifice" - one is the translation of "The New Year’s Sacrifice" in the first volume of "Selected Works of Lu Xun" (2nd edition, 1980) (hereinafter referred to as the 80th edition), and the other is the translation of "The New Year’s Sacrifice" in "Selected Novels of Lu Xun" (3rd edition, 1972). By comparing the two versions in terms of word selection, sentence pattern and discourse, it is found that the 80th version is more faithful to the content and verve of the original. At the same time, it gives full play to the advantages of English expression, so that it is concise, coherent and meaningful, which is closer to the style of Lu Xun's novels and creates a sad beauty similar to the original text. Therefore, the translation of the 80th edition can better reflect the characteristics of Yang's translation and the translator's pursuit of faith, expressiveness and verve. The difference between the two versions shows the dedication of Yang, reflects the changes in his translation thoughts and methods, and also shows the importance of knowing people and judging the world.

== Film adaptation ==
In 1956, the story was adapted into a film of a similar name by the Beijing Studio. The film maintains the story's dignified and severe style and grim mood. It focuses on the depiction of characters through facial expressions and body movements, as well as skillfully unveiling the temperaments of the characters by portraying the characters' visual imagery. The film has elements that are not present in the original story. For example, a scene where Mrs. Xiang Lin hacks at the temple threshold is not in the original story. In 1957, the film was a nominee for Crystal Globe at the 10th Karlovy Vary International Film Festival, and received the Special Prize of the Jury. In 1958, the film received the Silver Cap Prize at Mexico International Film Festival.

Reception

The adaptation strategy of the film, The New Year's Sacrifice, shows that adapting modern Chinese literary works in the "seventeen-year period" must have a clear political stance and arouse the audience's clear and accurate recognition of the story background. As the narrator emphasizes again at the end of the film: "This was more than 40 years ago, yes, this is a bygone era, should be fortunate that such an era has finally passed, finally gone forever." The film begins and ends by reiterating that the story belongs to a "bygone era" and stems from the clear political intention of the film's creators: to accuse the old era and to glorify the new China.

Even the screenwriter Xia Yan, who has outstanding literary achievements, has "misread" the original work again and again when adapting Lu Xun's The New Year's Sacrifice. Some of this "misreading" is detailed, and some is fundamental (such as the grasp of the theme of the original). Even, we cannot respectfully say that Xia Yan's deep understanding of the novel "The New Year’s Sacrifice" is insufficient. As Mr. Wang Furen commented, "When Xia Yan regards The New Year's Sacrifice as only the expression of Xiang Lin's tragic fate, its meaning is thin, its theme is not fundamentally different from that of a large number of later works reflecting the suffering life of the lower-class people, and the basic character relationships in it have also undergone significant changes." — Gong Jinping

Overall, the adaptation of "The New Year’s Sacrifice " is a success, especially because the film reproduces the folk customs of Jiangnan. The folk customs of Luzhen during the New Year, such as tracing red, cooking blessing ceremony, give people the atmosphere of the old Chinese New Year, while the insertion of graceful music in Jiangnan not only shows the regional colour, but also sets off the tragic atmosphere, giving people a sense of dignity. — Zheng Ping

== Opera adaptation ==
In 1977, the story was adapted into Yue Opera by Director Wu Zhen, actress Yuan Xuefen, and other crew members. The team studied and discussed based on the previous five revisions, and furthermore edited the script structure, plot setting, role shaping, theme expression, costume style and other aspects. The rearrangement of the performance according to the original words of the director Wu Chen has an important memorial significance to Lu Xun as a great writer, thinker and revolutionary. The play became the repertoire of Shanghai Yue Theatre, and also became one of the representative works of Yuan Xuefen, who played Xiang Lin's wife in the play. In October 1977, the Opera was performed successfully in Beijing Theater to commemorate the 41st anniversary of Lu Xun's death.

The following year, a colour widescreen opera art film of the Yue Opera “Xiang Lin Wives” was produced by Shanghai Film Studio. The main lyrics of which were made into records and audio tapes were distributed both domestically and internationally.
