= Lu Jinhua =

Chinese opera performer (1927–2018)

- Born: Ke Wenqi; February 25, 1927; Shanghai, Republic of China
- Died: January 10, 2018 (aged 90); Los Angeles metropolitan area, California, U.S.
- Spouse: Yang Defang (杨德芳)

Lu Jinhua (25 February 1927 – 10 January 2018) was a Chinese Yue opera artist who played Sheng roles. She starred in the 1958 Yue opera film A Test of Love alongside Fu Quanxiang.

Lu Jinhua founded the Shaozhuang Troupe with Wang Wenjuan in 1947. She is considered the founder of the Lu school.
