= A Torn Lily =

1953 Hong Kong film by Yuen Yang-an

- Film poster
- Chinese: 孽海花
- Literal meaning: A Flower in a Sinful Sea
- Hanyu Pinyin: Niè Hǎi Huā
- Directed by: Yuen Yang-an
- Written by: Yuen Yang-an
- Produced by: Yuen Yang-an
- Starring: Xia Meng; Ping Fan; Sun Zhijun; Li Ciyu; Shek Hwei
- Cinematography: Yu Sheng-san; Wong Shek-lam
- Edited by: Chong Man-long
- Music by: Li Houxiang
- Production company: Great Wall Movie Enterprises
- Release date: 13 February 1953
- Running time: 120 minutes
- Country: British Hong Kong
- Language: Mandarin

A Torn Lily is a 1953 Hong Kong black-and-white costume film written and directed by Yuen Yang-an, based on the traditional story of Wang Kui Betrays Guiying. The film was produced by Great Wall Movie Enterprises and stars their 20-year-old starlet Xia Meng (19 at the time of filming) in the lead role.

It became the first Hong Kong film to compete in an international festival when it entered the 7th Edinburgh International Film Festival in 1953, though it represented China. It is also likely the first Hong Kong film released in the People's Republic of China, where it drew an audience of over 8.7 million viewers on 16347 screens in December 1954, about 22 months after it was released in Hong Kong. It is currently kept at the Hong Kong Film Archive.

== Cast ==
- Xia Meng as Jiao Guiying, a courtesan
  - Dai Lei as Jiao Guiying (child)
- Ping Fan as Wang Kui, a scholar
- Shek Hwei as Xiao Ju, Guiying's friend
- Su Qin as Wang Zhong, the servant
- Sun Zhijun as Jin Lei
- Li Ciyu as Minister Xie
- Gam Sha as Zhang Xingjian
- Cao Yan as Zhang Qian
- Chang Tseng as Nobleman Kou
- Chan Ching-po as Wandering Singer
- Shi Lei as Prime Minister Han
- Chi Ching
- Wen Yi-min
- Huang Fan
- Wong Chun
- Chu Li
- Cheung Ho

== Reception ==
Raymond Durgnat wrote a not very flattering review in Sight & Sound (Vol. 24–25), calling Chinese films (along with Japanese films and Vsevolod Pudovkin's films) too "theatrical". But he called the first half of the film "beautifully evoked".
