= Fujian Fanghua Yue Drama Troupe =

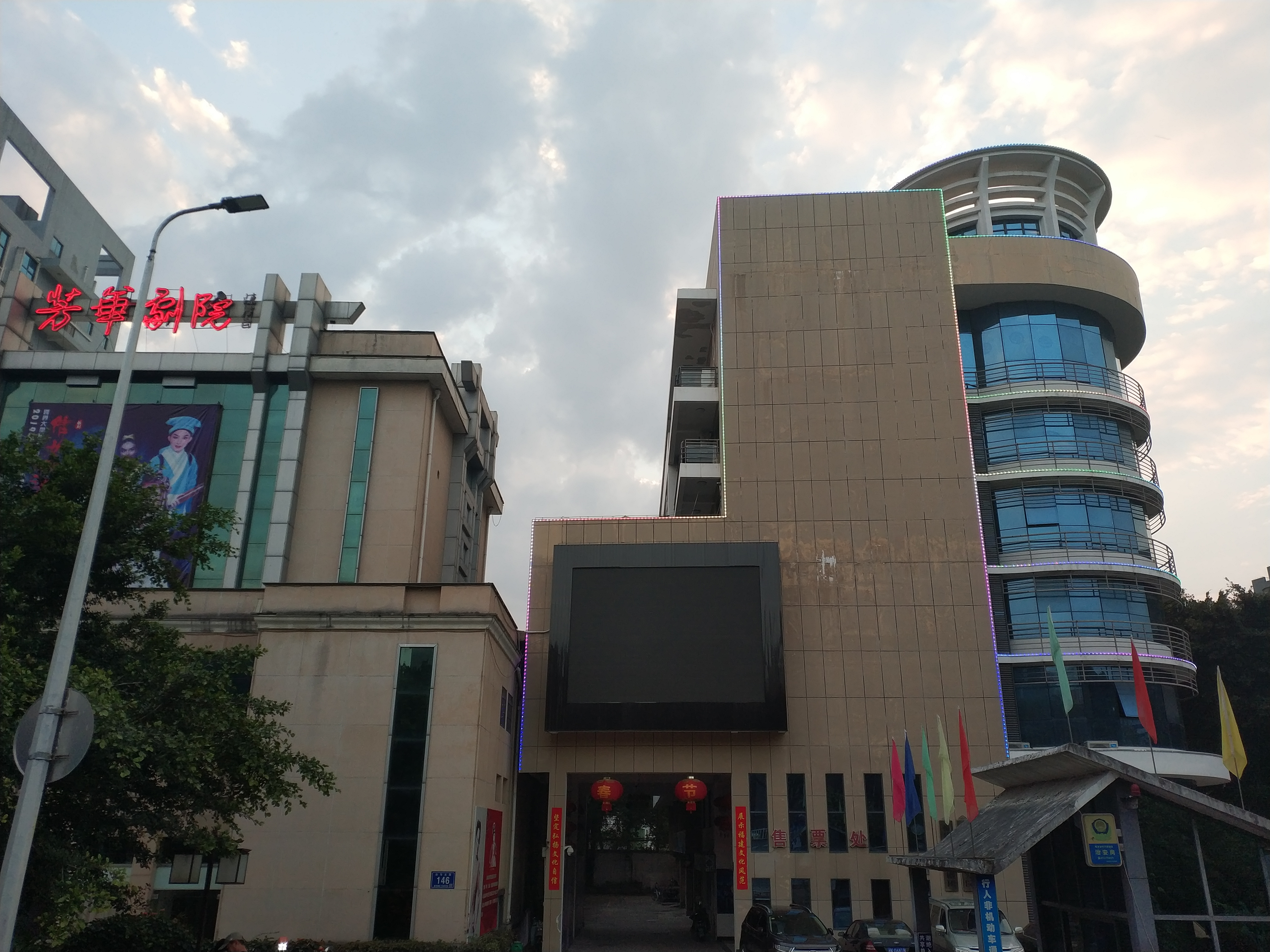
- Entrance to Fanghua Theater in Taijiang District, Fuzhou

Background information
- Origin: Shanghai, China (1946–1959); Fuzhou, Fujian, China (1959–present)
- Genre: Yue opera
- Years active: 1946–present

Chinese name
- Traditional Chinese: 福建省芳華越劇團
- Simplified Chinese: 福建省芳华越剧团
Transcriptions
Standard Mandarin
- Hanyu Pinyin: Fújiàn Shěng Fānghuá Yuèjù Tuán

The Fujian Fanghua Yue Drama Troupe is a Chinese Yue opera troupe based in Fuzhou, Fujian. It was founded in 1946 by Yin Guifang in Shanghai as Shanghai Fanghua Yue Drama Troupe and relocated to Fujian in 1959.
