= The Legend of Chasing Fish =

- Also known as: Mermaid Legend
- Traditional Chinese: 追魚傳奇
- Simplified Chinese: 追鱼传奇
- Hanyu Pinyin: Zhuīyǘ Chuánqí
- Genre: Historical, epic fantasy, romantic comedy
- Written by: Deng Zishan
- Directed by: Wu Jinyuan; Chen Guohua; Huang Jintian
- Starring: Zhao Liying; Kenny Kwan; Shirley Dai; Ding Zijun
- Opening theme: Xiang Xiang Zhui
- Ending theme: Kenny Kwan Whirlpool
- Country of origin: China
- Original language: Mandarin
- No. of episodes: 32

Production
- Executive producer: Ye Yunfei
- Production location: Hengdian World Studios
- Production company: Guangsha Media

Original release
- Network: Hunan Television
- Release: 13 July – 19 August 2013

The Legend of Chasing Fish is a 2013 Chinese mythology fantasy romantic comedy television series directed Wu Jinyuan, Chen Guohua and Huang Jintianby, and starring Zhao Liying, Kenny Kwan, Shirley Dai and Ding Zijun. It was first broadcast on 13 July 2013 in Hunan Television in China. The story is based on Yulan Ji.

== Plot ==
It tells the story of the Chinese benevolent fish yaoguai named Hongling. While on a mission to find the perfect birthday gift for the Azure Dragon Emperor, Hongling befriends youngster Zhang Zen. In an unexpected and heartbreaking twist of events, Zhang Zen's father is murdered, and Hongling fails to pass through the Dragon Gate, which will ascend her to a dragon. The Dragon Prince convinces the king to make an exception should she help Zhang Zen get married and bring back the wedding flower ball. Unfortunately, while troubles continue to appear on his path, Hongling finds herself falling for the youngster and sacrificing immortality for love, not knowing that troubles are still lurking in the corners and will take unimaginative measures to drive them apart.

== Cast ==
- Zhao Liying as Hongling, a carp yaoguai.
- Kenny Kwan as Zhang Zhen, a scholar.
- Shirley Dai as Jin Mudan, a spoiled rich girl.
- Ding Zijun as Zhan Feng, the prince in the Song dynasty.
- Waise Lee as Jin Chong, the father of Jin Mudan, the prime minister of Song dynasty.
- Cao Xinyue as Tang Xin, a village girl who falls in love with the prince Zhan Feng.
- Bai Shan as Jin Ruolan, the sister of Jin Chong and Zhang Zhen's stepmother.
- Zhang Mingming as the dragon prince.

=== Other ===
- Lin Daxin as Bao Zheng, a powerful government officer.
- Wang Hui as Zhan Zhao.
- Huang Hai as Gongsun Ce.
- Feng Jin'gao as Emperor Renzong of Song.
- Qu Gao as Azure Dragon, king of the Eastern Ocean.
- Maggie Li as Guan Yin, goddess of mercy.
- Yang Mingna as Xiao Longnu, the dragon princess.

== Production ==
This television series shot the scene in Hengdian World Studios, Zhejiang.

== Critical response ==
It received positive reviews.

Its audience ratings are very high, and in box-office terms, it was a great success.
