= Xie Fang =

Chinese actress and author (1935–2024)

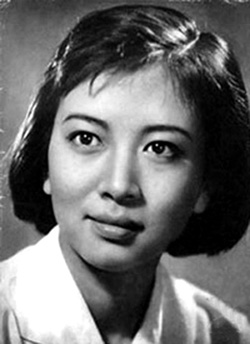
- Born: Xie Huaifu (謝懷復); 1 November 1935; Huangpi, Hubei, China
- Died: 19 December 2024 (aged 89); Beijing, China
- Occupation: Actress
- Years active: 1951–2024

Xie Fang (Chinese: 谢芳; 1 November 1935 – 19 December 2024) was a Chinese actress and author. She was best known for her involvement with pre-Cultural Revolution cinema.

== Life and career ==
Xie was born in Huangpi, Hubei, China and grew up in Shanghai. Both of her parents were teachers at a Christian school. Her parents became increasingly involved with the Chinese Communist Party; this would influence her career by acting in more "revolutionary" plays like The White Haired Girl. She graduated from an all-girls' high school in 1951, and started acting shortly after. She joined acting troupe SOUTH backstage and began singing in the opera. Xie married in 1957. In 1959, Xie starred in Song of Youth; this was her break out role. She signed with Beijing Film Studio in 1963. Xie, then, would star in the Xie Jin film Two Stage Sisters in 1964. She was the recipient of the Golden Phoenix Award in 1995 for her contributions to Chinese cinema.

In addition to being an actress, Xie was also an author. She died in Beijing on 19 December 2024, at the age of 89.

== Selected filmography ==
- The Chinese Widow (2017)
- Love Will Be Back (2015)
- Woman-Taxi-Woman (1991)
- This Man Is Dangerous (1985)
- Two Stage Sisters (1964)
- Early Spring in February (1963)
- Song of Youth (1959)

== Bibliography ==
- Gone Hastily (往事匆匆, 1997) ISBN 978-7506312707
- Unsinkable Lake : Chinese Modern Fiction Film (不沉的湖: 中国现代影视小说, 1997) ISBN 978-7530204634

== See also ==
- Cinema of China
