= Yin Guifang =

Chinese opera singer-actress

- Born: December 1, 1919; Xinchang County, Zhejiang, Republic of China
- Died: March 1, 2000 (aged 80); Shanghai, People's Republic of China
- Occupation: Yue opera performer
- Employer: Fujian Fanghua Yue Drama Troupe
- Known for: Young sheng roles
- Style: Yin school (founder)

Chinese name
- Chinese: 尹桂芳
Transcriptions
Standard Mandarin
- Hanyu Pinyin: Yǐn Guìfāng

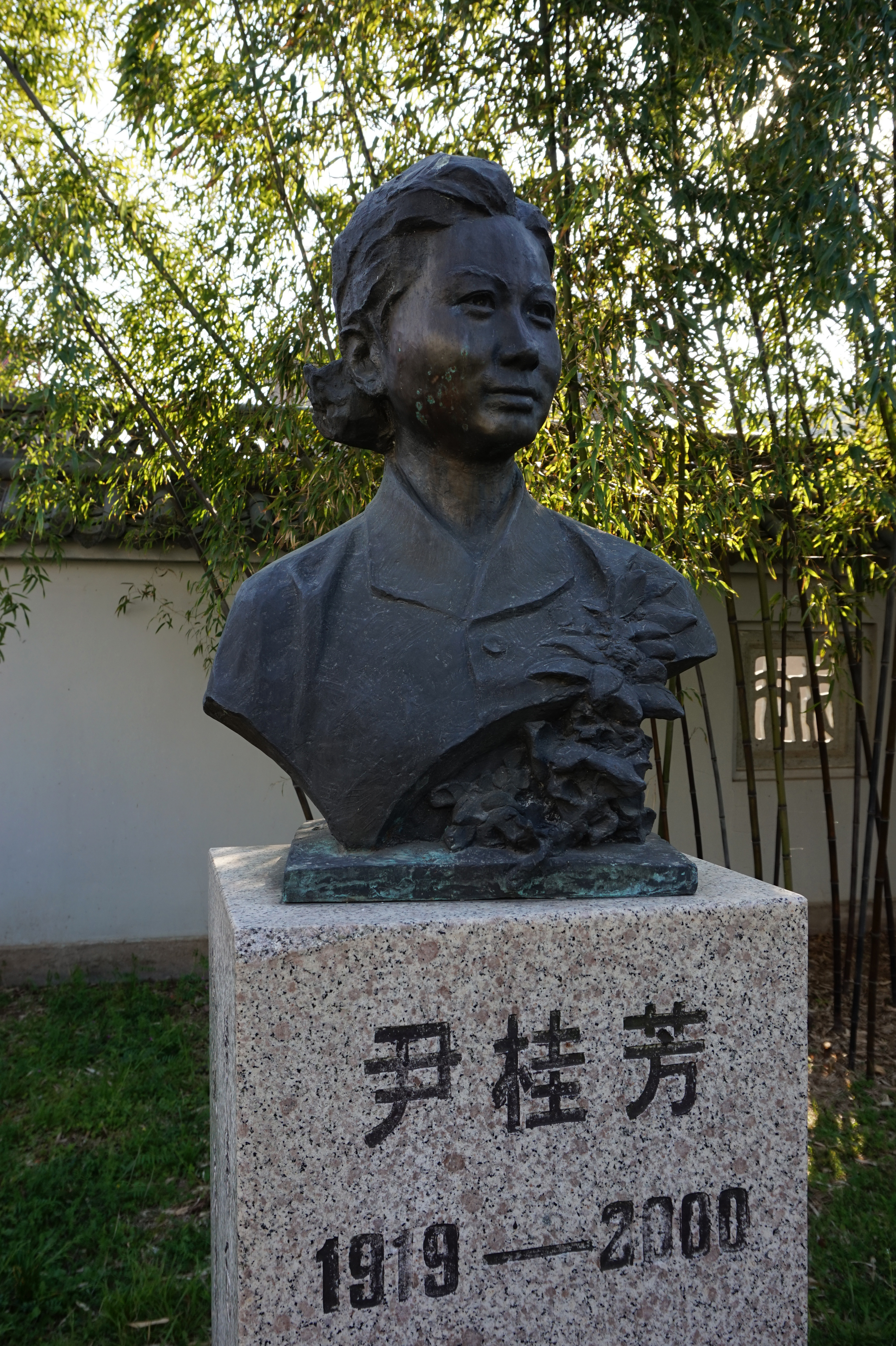
A bust of Yin Guifang in Shengzhou, Zhejiang.

Yin Guifang (1 December 1919 – 1 March 2000) was a Chinese Yue opera singer-actress who played Sheng roles (i.e. male characters), sometimes known as the "Empress of Yue opera". Born into a poor family in Xinchang County, Zhejiang, Yin began her career at age 10 and rose to one of the biggest stars in 1940s Shanghai.

Like many artists, Yin Guifang was tortured during the Cultural Revolution (1966–1976) which left half her body permanently paralyzed. After the Cultural Revolution, she continued to work in Yue opera despite her disability. In the 1980s she groomed a number of young singers who later became leading figures in Yue opera, among them Mao Weitao, Zhao Zhigang, Wang Jun'an and Xiao Ya.
