= Xia Meng =

Hong Kong actress and film producer

- Portrait of Xia
- Born: Yang Meng; 16 February 1933; Shanghai, Republic of China
- Died: 30 October 2016 (aged 83); Hong Kong
- Spouse: Lin Baocheng
- Awards: Golden Phoenix Awards; 1993 Special Contribution Award; Hong Kong Film Awards – Best Film; 1983 Boat People

Chinese name
- Traditional Chinese: 夏夢
- Simplified Chinese: 夏梦
Transcriptions
Standard Mandarin
- Hanyu Pinyin: Xià Mèng
- Wade–Giles: Hsia4 Meng4
Yue: Cantonese
- Jyutping: haa6 mung6

Yang Meng
- Traditional Chinese: 楊濛
- Simplified Chinese: 杨蒙
Transcriptions
Standard Mandarin
- Hanyu Pinyin: Yáng Méng
- Wade–Giles: Yang2 Meng2
Yue: Cantonese
- Jyutping: joeng4 mung4

Xia Meng (16 February 1933 – 30 October 2016), a.k.a. Hsia Moon and Miranda Yang, born Yang Meng, was an actress and film producer from Hong Kong. She appeared in Hong Kong films in the 1950s and 1960s, and was involved in the region's left-wing film scene. In the 1980s, Xia Meng worked as a film producer and was involved in the Hong King New Wave.

== Early life and education ==
Xia Meng was born Yang Meng on 16 February 1933 in Shanghai.

She was first exposed to drama at McTyeire School, an elite girls' school established by Methodist missionaries in Shanghai. In 1947, she moved with her family to Hong Kong, where she attended Maryknoll Convent School. In 1949, In conjunction with an event at her school, She was chosen to play the leading role in McTyeire School's English-language production of Saint Joan.

Xia Meng's younger sister, Yang Jie, played on the China women's national basketball team from 1954 to 1957.

== Film career ==
In 1950, Yang Meng (birthname) and her friends visited a film set of the Great Wall Movie Enterprises Ltd. This was where she was first spotted by the crews, as well as studio manager Yuan Yang'an. Through the help of Yuan's daughter, Mao Mei (an actress and ballerina), Yang accepted his invitation and joined the studio at the age of 17. Inspired by Shakespeare's A Midsummer Night's Dream, the new actress decided to rename herself Xia Meng (literally "summer dream").

=== The Great Wall Crown Princess ===
Xia shaking hands with Mao Zedong in Beijing in 1957. Smiling behind Mao is Deng Xiaoping.

She was given her first role as the title character in Li Pingqian's A Night-Time Wife (1951). The comedy was a hit and rocketed Hsia Moon to stardom. Many other roles followed, including a tragic demimondaine of Cao Yu's Sunrise and the virtuous widow of A Widow's Tears, both in 1956. She portrayed the scapegoat of the feudal moral value in the critically acclaimed film The Eternal Love (1960), the deprived bourgeoisie in HKFA Archival Gem's Romance of The Boudoir (1960), and played a man masquerading as a woman in The Bride Hunter (1960).

Xia was one of the few Hong Kong movie stars whose films were released in the People's Republic of China before the Cultural Revolution. Xinhua News has compared her to Audrey Hepburn.

=== Cultural Revolution ===
In the summer of 1967, Xia visited Guangzhou and witnessed the beginning of the Cultural Revolution. Hong Kong cinema was soon influenced by the Chinese Communist Party, and Great Wall's movies no longer had the same cachet as before. Xia, who was pregnant at the time, excused herself from involvement in the political movement. She resigned from the studio in September 1967, shortly after appearing in Oh, the Spring Is Here (1967), and quietly left for Canada before the film was released.

=== Return as film producer ===
After the end of the Cultural Revolution, Xia was invited by Liao Chengzhi, then vice chairman of the National People's Congress (NPC), to attend the 4th National Congress of China Federation of Literary and Art Circles (CFLAC) held in Beijing from 30 October—16 November 1979. This is considered to be her first public appearance after her final screen performance in 1967. Under the encouragement of Liao, she decided returned to the movie industry as a producer after an absence of ten years.

In 1980, Xia formed Bluebird Movie Enterprises Ltd, and produced the debut film Boat People (Ann Hui, 1982), a movie and landmark feature for Hong Kong New Wave, which won several awards including the best picture and best director in the second Hong Kong Film Award. After producing Young Heroes (Mou Dunfei, 1983) and Homecoming (Yim Ho, 1984), Xia sold her film company to Jiang Zuyi. She had no involvement in film production after that.

== Other ==
=== Awards ===
Xia's performance in Peerless Beauty (1953) and A Widow's Tears (1956) won her the Greatest Individual Achievement Award given by the Cultural Ministry of the People's Republic of China. In 1995, Xia was honored the Chinese Film Stars Special Award, in conjunction with 90 anniversary of Chinese Cinema.

=== Political activities ===
She was also involved in political activities, being selected as a committee member of the Chinese National Cultural Alliance and the Chinese People's Political Consultative Conference.

=== Legacy ===
For her contribution to the motion picture industry, Xia has a star with a hand print and autograph by the name of Miranda Yang on the Avenue of Stars in Tsim Sha Tsui Promenade, Hong Kong.

In August 2005, Xia was one of 128 movie stars recognized by China in a commemorative stamp collection marking 100 years of Chinese language cinema.

=== Print pictorials and interviews ===
- Law Kar, Hsia Moon: episodes of a summer dream (Hong Kong 1995); ISBN 962-357-773-7
- Zhu Shunci et al., An age of idealism: Great Wall & Feng Huang days, (Hong Kong Film Archive 2001); ISBN 962-8050-14-1
- Liu Shu, The Peerless Xia Meng, China Film Press, Beijing, 2007; ISBN 7-106-02637-9

== Filmography ==
| Year | English title | Original title | Role | Notes |
|---|---|---|---|---|
| 1951 | A Night-Time Wife | 禁婚記 | Ying Xiazhi | |
| 1952 | Father Marries Again | 一家春 | | |
| 1952 | Modern Red Chamber Dream | 新紅樓夢 | | |
| 1952 | Nonya | 娘惹 | Yang Yongfen | |
| 1953 | A Torn Lily | 孽海花 | Jiao Guiying | |
| 1953 | Marriage Affair | 門 | Kung Mei Feng | |
| 1953 | Day Dream | 白日夢 | Wang Guoying; Wang Guozhen | |
| 1953 | The Peerless Beauty | 絕代佳人 | Ru Ji | |
| 1953 | The Gold-Plated Man | 花花世界 | Mrs Wei | |
| 1954 | Merry-Go-Round | 歡喜冤家 | Zhang Qingping | |
| 1954 | Tales of the City | 都會交響曲 | Nancy | |
| 1954 | Joyce and Deli | 姊妹曲 | Lu Deli | |
| 1955 | Never Leave Me | 不要離開我 | Mu Sangqing | |
| 1956 | Sunrise | 日出 | Chen Bailu | |
| 1956 | The Three Loves | 三戀 | Bai Yiwen | |
| 1956 | The Wedding Night | 新婚第一夜 | Lin Fang | |
| 1956 | A Widow's Tears | 新寡 | Fang Mei | |
| 1957 | Forever Waiting | 望夫山下 | Liu Wanlin | |
| 1957 | Escape Into Trap | 逆旅風雲 | Xiao Jiaohong | |
| 1957 | Whither Spring? | 春歸何處 | Zhang Ming | |
| 1958 | Those Bewitching Eyes | 眼兒媚 | Yan Er-Mei | |
| 1958 | The Way of Husband and Wife | 搶新郎 | Zhang Caifeng | |
| 1958 | The Green Swan Club | 綠天鵝夜總會 | Qiu Lin | |
| 1958 | Husband Hunters | 夫妻經 | Zhang Jingfen | |
| 1959 | Sweet as Honey | 甜甜蜜蜜 | Ting Hui-Lan | |
| 1959 | Feast of a Rich Family | 豪門夜宴 | Guest at banquet | |
| 1959 | An Unfulfilled Wish | 稱心如意 | Wanfen | |
| 1960 | Bride Hunter | 王老虎搶親 | Zhou Wenbin | Yue opera film, cross-gender acting |
| 1960 | A Mermaid's Love | 碧波仙侶 | Jin Mudan; Carp Spirit | Musical film |
| 1960 | Romance in the Boudoir | 香閨春情 | Suxuan | |
| 1960 | Rendezvous | 佳人有約 | | |
| 1960 | The Eternal Love | 同命鴛鴦 | Madam Liu | |
| 1961 | Ah, It's Spring! | 滿園春色 | | |
| 1962 | The Princess Falls in Love | 三看御妹劉金定 | Liu Jinding | Yue opera film |
| 1962 | Let's Get Married | 我們要結婚 | Liu Ying | |
| 1963 | Between Vengeance and Love | 雪地情仇 | Yinzhu | |
| 1963 | Dong Xiaowan | 董小宛 | Dong Xiaowan | |
| 1964 | My Darling Princess | 金枝玉葉 | Princess | Yue opera film |
| 1964 | Garden of Repose | 故園春夢 | Wan Zhaohua | |
| 1965 | A Heroic Romance | 烽火姻緣 | She Saihua | Yue opera film |
| 1967 | The Fair Ladies | 白領麗人 | Jiang Yuhua | |
| 1968 | Oh, the Spring's Here! | 迎春花 | | |
| 1982 | Boat People | 投奔怒海 | | Producer |
| 1983 | Young Heroes | 自古英雄出少年 | | Producer |
| 1984 | Homecoming | 似水流年 | | Producer |
