= Xu Yulan =

Chinese actress

- Born: Wang Yulan; December 27, 1921; Fuyang, Zhejiang, Republic of China
- Died: April 19, 2017 (aged 95); Shanghai, People's Republic of China
- Occupation: Yue opera singer-actress
- Spouse: Yu Zeren (俞则人)
- Children: 2

Chinese name
- Traditional Chinese: 徐玉蘭
- Simplified Chinese: 徐玉兰
Transcriptions
Standard Mandarin
- Hanyu Pinyin: Xú Yùlán

Birth name
- Traditional Chinese: 汪玉蘭
- Simplified Chinese: 汪玉兰
Transcriptions
Standard Mandarin
- Hanyu Pinyin: Wāng Yùlán

Xu Yulan (born Wang Yulan, December 27, 1921 – April 19, 2017) was a Yue opera singer-actress who plays Sheng roles (all male characters).

== Early life ==
Xu Yulan was born in Zhejiang province (the location of present-day Xindeng township, Fuyang District). She trained in traditional Chinese opera, which included training in acrobatics and martial arts, at Dong'an Theatre School.

== Career ==
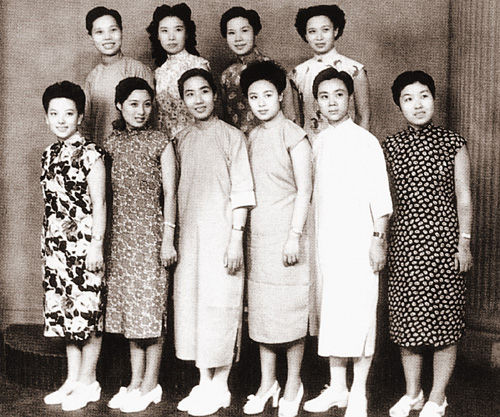
Xu Yulan (back, second from right) with other 9 Yue opera actresses in 1947, collectively known as the "Ten Sisters".

Xu Yulan often played male roles in all-female Yue opera productions, and the "Xu style" of playing these xiaosheng (young male) roles is named for her. She co-starred with Wang Wenjuan for many years beginning in 1948, and commissioned works from other composers. In 1949 she was one of the performers required to take classes and pursue research on folk opera for the Shanghai government. In 1952 she won first prize in the first Chinese folk opera festival organized under the new Ministry of Culture. In 1953 she performed opera for Chinese and Korean military audiences, for which she was awarded a medal by the Korean Workers' Party. For much of her life she was an instructor, consultant, and advisor to the Shanghai Yue Opera Academy, and performed with the Academy's opera company on overseas tours to East Germany, the Soviet Union, Vietnam, and North Korea.

Xu Yulan's performances were preserved on film, including in The Carp Fairy (1959) and Dream of the Red Chamber (also known as A Dream of Red Mansions) (1962, directed by Cen Fan), the latter enormously successful with Chinese audiences when it was shown in 1978. She also produced a television series of her career highlights. With the loosening of restrictions on artists in China, she formed the Red Mansions Opera Company, and was a popular guest at concerts in Singapore, Hong Kong, Taiwan, and Thailand. Late in life she was on the executive committee of the Chinese Dramatists' Association.

== Personal life ==
Xu Yulan lived with her chaperone and personal assistant Zhao Naixue from 1946 until she married in 1954.
