= Wang Wenjuan =

Chinese actress (1926–2021)

- Born: 19 December 1926; Sheng County, Zhejiang, China
- Died: 6 August 2021 (aged 94); Huadong Hospital, Shanghai, China
- Occupation: Yue opera performer
- Known for: Young dan roles
- Style: Wang school (founder)
- Spouse: Sun Daolin (m. 1961–2007)
- Children: 1

Chinese name
- Chinese: 王文娟
Transcriptions
Standard Mandarin
- Hanyu Pinyin: Wáng Wénjuān

Wang Wenjuan (Chinese: 王文娟; pinyin: Wáng Wénjuān; 19 December 1926 – 6 August 2021) was a noted performer in Yue opera. She was well known for playing the title role Lin Daiyu in the 1962 film of Dream of the Red Chamber, an adaptation of a work by Cao Xueqin.

== Biography ==
Wang Wenjuan was born in Shengzhou, Zhejiang Province. In 1947, she and Lu Jinhua founded a yueju troupe called Shaozhuang Troupe (Chinese: 少壮越剧团) in Shanghai. In 1961, she married Sun Daolin who was a famous Chinese director. She died on 6 August 2021 in Huadong Hospital, Shanghai.
