= Tongyangxi =

Pre-modern Chinese tradition of arranged marriage

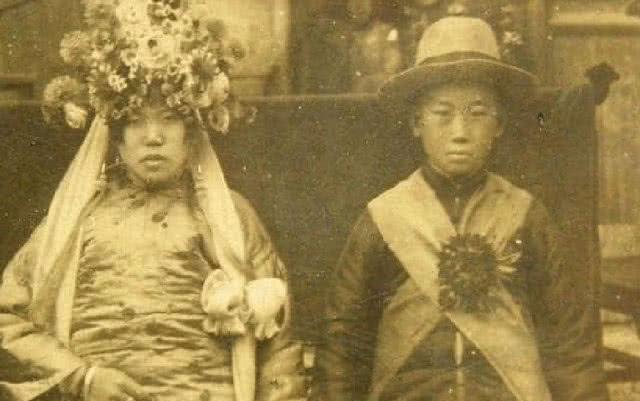
A tongyangxi and her child husband on their wedding day, Republican Era

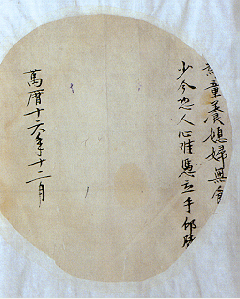
A tongyangxi marriage certificate from the Ming dynasty (1588)

Tongyangxi (traditional Chinese: 童養媳; simplified Chinese: 童养媳; pinyin: tóngyǎngxí), also known as Shim-pua marriage in Hokkien (Chinese: 媳婦仔; Pe̍h-ōe-jī: sin-pū-á or sim-pū-á; and also written as 新婦仔), was a tradition of arranged marriage dating back to pre-modern China, in which a family would adopt a pre-adolescent daughter as a future bride for one of their pre-adolescent (usually infant) sons, and the children would be raised together.

A direct translation of the Hokkien word "sim-pu-a" is "little daughter-in-law", in which the characters "sim-pu" (traditional Chinese: 媳婦; simplified Chinese: 媳妇; pinyin: xífù) mean daughter-in-law and the particle character "a" (阿; ā or 仔; zǐ; á) indicates a diminutive. The similarly used Mandarin Chinese term "tongyangxi" (童養媳; 童养媳) means literally "child (童) raised (養) daughter-in-law (媳)" and is the term typically used as translation for the English term "child bride".

These child marriages, which guaranteed a wife for a poor son, were more prevalent among the impoverished. So long as they were spared from having to support a daughter who would eventually marry and leave the family, the families who gave up their daughters also gained from this. Since these unions were rarely successful, China outlawed them in 1949. Compulsory education in Taiwan allowed these girls to leave their homes and gain exposure to the outside world, which frequently resulted in their adoption from their adoptive families. The practice ended there by the 1970s.

== Social anthropology perspective ==
Within social anthropology research of Chinese marriage, shim-pua marriage is referred to as a "minor marriage" because the daughter-in-law joins her future husband's household when both are minors, in contrast to Chinese major marriage, in which the bride joins her husband's household on the day of the wedding. The shim-pua daughter was often adopted into a family who already had a son to whom she would be betrothed, though this was not always the case. Instead, some families adopted a shim-pua daughter prior to having a son, prompted by a traditional belief that adopting a shim-pua would enhance a wife's likelihood of bearing a son. Although the shim-pua daughter joins the household as a child, the marriage would only occur after both had reached puberty. Depending upon the family's socioeconomic status and financial means, the wedding could range from a large banquet on par with a major marriage to a small family ceremony, or in the simplest cases "a bow to the ancestors and a slight change in the family's sleeping arrangements."

Shim-pua marriage occurred over a range of socioeconomic classes, but was particularly common among poor and rural families. Among the well to do, marrying a son in a major marriage was prestigious and a display of status, but also costly. In poorer and more rural communities, shim-pua minor marriage was inexpensive and helped to ensure that no matter how poor a family was, their sons would have wives when they reached marrying age, and thus a greater likelihood of producing descendants. In contrast, the high bride price to acquire a bride for a son to wed in a major marriage could be prohibitive, sometimes as much as a year's income for the family. If the family could not afford such a bride for major marriage, this could result in a failure to produce descendants and the end of the family lineage. In contrast, the costs of adopting an infant daughter were low and the costs of raising her as a shim-pua often included only food and clothing. In poor communities, limited wealth or status motivated both the adoption of a shim-pua daughter into the family and the giving up of biological daughters as shim-pua to other families. For a family of limited means or social status, a biological daughter offered little surety; traditionally she would be married off into another family and would neither care for her parents in old age nor extend the family lineage. In contrast, a shim-pua daughter would remain in the household, caring for the parents through their old age, and would bear their descendants. For these reasons, adoption of an infant shim-pua daughter frequently coincided with giving up a biological infant daughter for adoption and then raising the shim-pua daughter in her place.

These marriages were often unsuccessful. This has been explained as a demonstration of the Westermarck effect. The practice of minor marriage was generally viewed with pity and seen as dictated by poverty, as no one would choose to marry someone with whom they lived as a sibling.

== End of the practice ==
In mainland China following the Chinese Communist Revolution, the practice was outlawed by the Chinese Communist Party in 1949. The New Marriage Law of 1950 forbid the practice. In 1953, the Committee on the Implementation of the Marriage Law declared that an adopted daughter who had not been married had the freedom to choose a marriage partner regardless of the agreement between the natal and adopted families, and that a daughter-in-law who had already married could file for divorce.

In Taiwan, several legal issues arose in the 1950s, when shim-pua daughters were registered as adopted daughters, or their male equivalent were registered as adopted sons. Because the couple were legally considered step-siblings, the Taiwanese common law forbade their marriage. Three judicial reviews were made by the Judicial Yuan to allow their marriage. Shim-pua marriage fell out of practice by the 1970s due to increased wealth resulting from Taiwan's economic success, making such arrangements unnecessary. One factor that accelerated the demise of shim-pua marriage was the establishment of compulsory public education in Taiwan, which compelled families to send all children, including daughters and adoptive shim-pua daughters to school. Greater exposure outside the home and education itself often created opportunities for shim-pua daughters to resist or escape the marriage arrangement.

== Related concepts ==
Zhaozhui (Chinese: 招贅; pinyin: zhāozhuì or Chinese: 招婿 or 招翁; Pe̍h-ōe-jī: chio-sài or chio-ang) is a related custom by which a wealthy family that lacks an heir might take in a boy child, although such marriages usually involve a procreation-age male. Since these marriages required the husband entering the wife's household (contrary to traditional Chinese norms), they were relegated to a lower social status. During the Qing dynasty, these marriages became increasingly common to maintain inheritance bloodlines. The boy would take on the familial name of his new family, and typically would marry the family's daughter.

== See also ==
- Child marriage
- Forced marriage
- Japanese adult adoption
- Mukoyōshi

== Bibliography ==
- Wilson, Edward O. (1998). Consilience: The Unity of Knowledge.
- Arnhart, Larry (2005). "Chapter 10: The incest taboo as Darwinian natural right". In Wolf, Arthur P.; Durham, William H. (eds.). Inbreeding, Incest, and the Incest Taboo: the State of Knowledge at the Turn of the Century. Stanford, California: Stanford University Press. ISBN 978-0-8047-4596-3.
- Lin, Yuju (2011). "Zhaozhui son-in-law". Encyclopedia of Taiwan. Council for Cultural Affairs.
- Sa, Sophia (1985). "Chapter 12: Marriage among the Taiwanese of Pre-1945 Taipei". In Hanley, Susan B.; Wolf, Arthur P. (eds.). Family and Population in East Asian History. Stanford, California: Stanford University Press. ISBN 978-0-8047-1232-3.
- Stange, Mary Zeiss; Oyster, Carol K.; Sloan, Jane E., eds. (2011). "Marriages, Arranged". Encyclopedia of Women in Today's World. Vol. 2. SAGE Publications, Inc. pp. 899–902. ISBN 978-1-4129-7685-5.
- Wilson, Margo; Daly, Martin (1992). "Chapter 7: The Man Who Mistook His Wife for a Chattel". In Barkow, J.H.; Cosmides, L.; Tooby, J. (eds.). The Adapted Mind. Evolutionary psychology and the generation of culture. New York: Oxford University Press. ISBN 978-0-19-510107-2.
- Wolf, Arthur P.; Huang, Chieh-shan (1980). Marriage and adoption in China: 1845–1945. Stanford University Press. ISBN 978-0-8047-4596-3.
- Wolf, Arthur P. (2005). "Chapter 4: Explaining the Westermarck effect, or, what did natural selection select for?". In Wolf, Arthur P.; Durham, William H. (eds.). Inbreeding, Incest, and the Incest Taboo: the State of Knowledge at the Turn of the Century. Stanford, California: Stanford University Press. ISBN 978-0-8047-4596-3.
- Wolf, Margery (1972). Women and the Family in Rural Taiwan. Stanford, California: Stanford University Press. ISBN 978-0-8047-0849-4.
- Yu, Guang-hong; Huang, Yu-lin; Chuu, Ling-in (2011). "Chapter 12: Illegitimacy, Adoption, and Mortality among Girls in Penghu, 1906–1945". In Engelen, Theo; Shepherd, John R.; Yang, Wen-shan (eds.). Death at the Opposite Ends of the Eurasian Continent: Mortality Trends in Taiwan and the Netherlands 1850–1945. Amsterdam: Amsterdam University Press. ISBN 978-90-5260-379-7.
