= Yuan Xuefen =

Chinese operatic singer

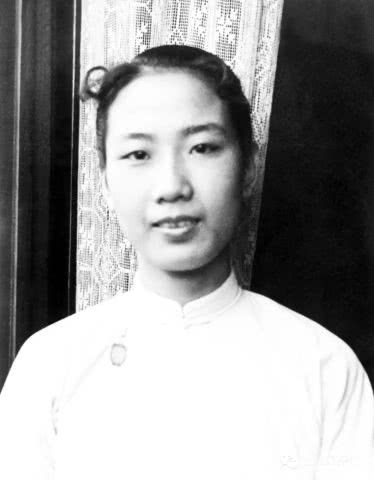
- Yuan Xuefen in the 1940s
- Born: 26 March 1922; Sheng County, Zhejiang, Republic of China
- Died: 19 February 2011 (aged 88); Shanghai, People's Republic of China
- Occupation: Yue opera performer
- Known for: Young dan roles
- Style: Yuan school (founder)

Chinese name
- Chinese: 袁雪芬
Transcriptions
Standard Mandarin
- Hanyu Pinyin: Yuán Xuěfēn

Yuan Xuefen (26 March 1922 – 19 February 2011) was a noted performer in the Yue opera genre of Chinese opera. She has been called "arguably the most important actress in the recent history of Yueju [Shaoxing] opera". The only other artist to be ranked with her is Fu Quanxiang.

== Biography ==
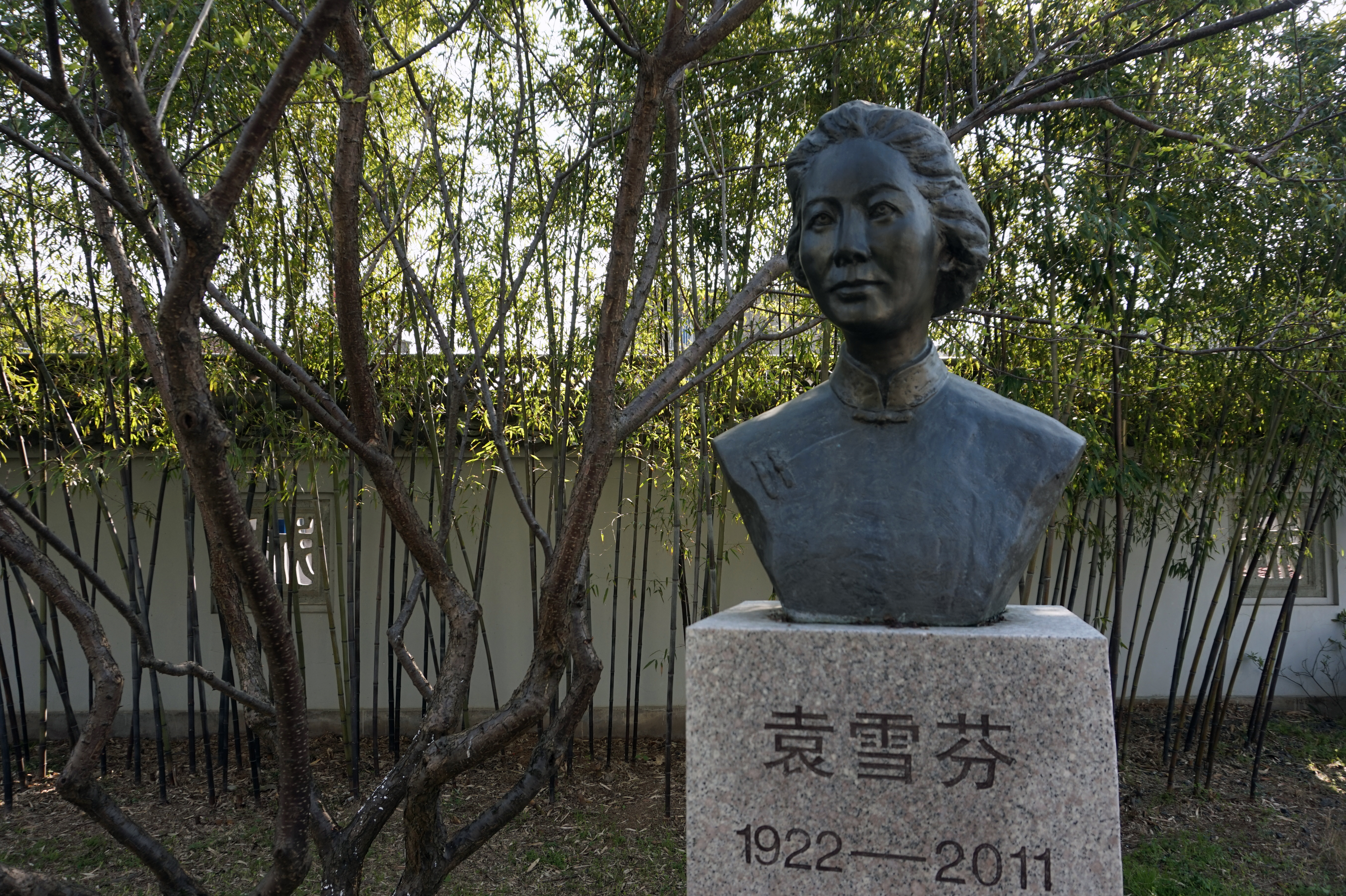
A bust of Yuan Xuefen in her hometown Shengzhou.

Yuan is most known for playing the title role in the 1946 production of Sister Xianglin, an adaptation of a work by Lu Xun. Before beginning work on the adaptation of the work, she personally visited the home of Xu Guangping and Zhou Haiying, Lu Xun's wife and son, and asked their permission. According to Zhou, his mother quickly granted the request. Yuan is credited with leading the reform of Yue opera staging during the 1940s. Changes included the extensive use of lighting and scenery, and a new, soft style of costuming. In 1964, the film Two Stage Sisters, based on Yuan's life, was released. During the Cultural Revolution, Yuan was severely persecuted as a way of attacking Premier Zhou Enlai, who supported the film.
