= Yue opera =

Chinese opera genre

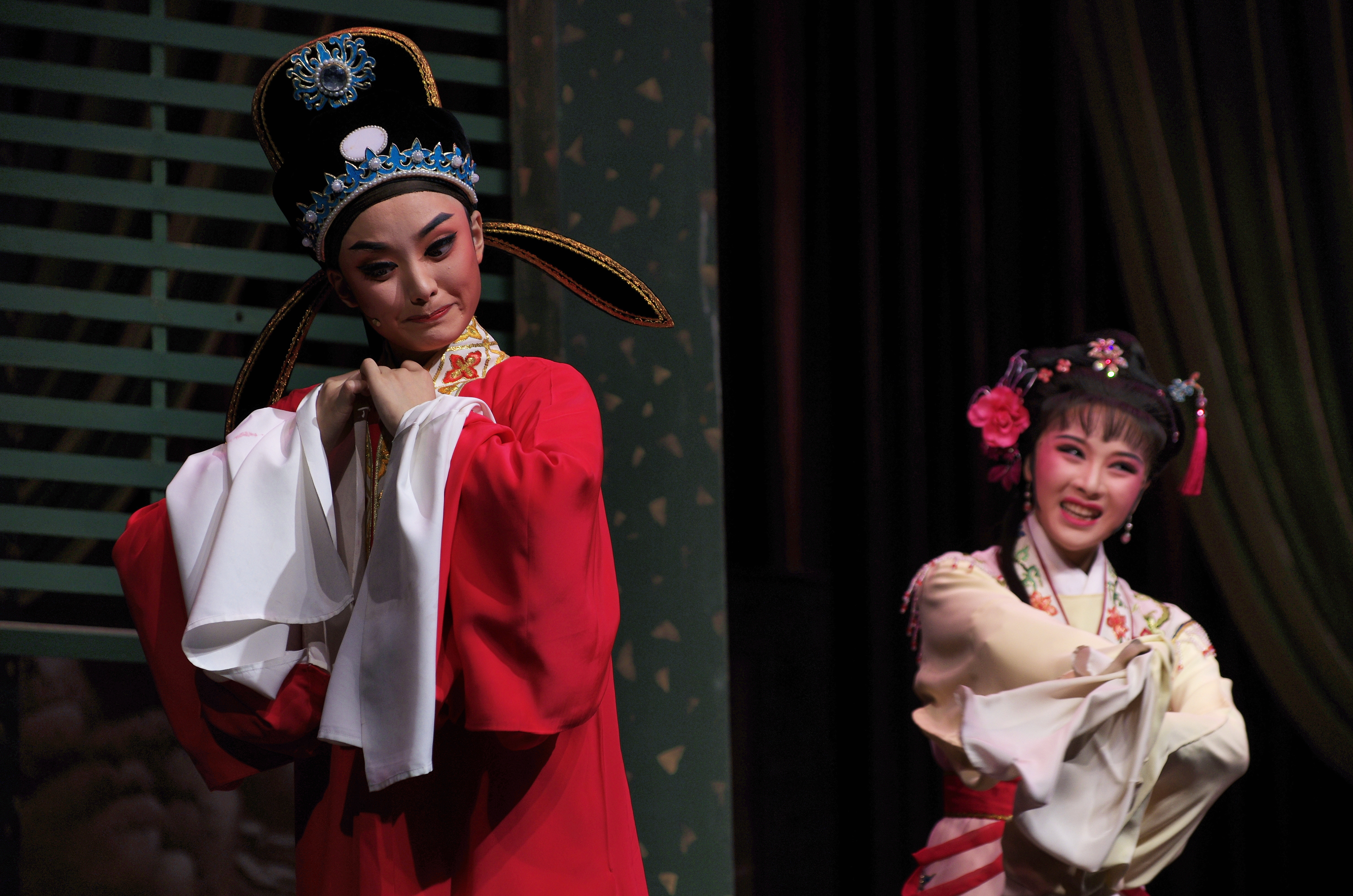
- A 2016 performance of Romance of the Western Chamber by Shanghai Theatre Academy students. The actress in red is portraying a male character.
- Typical instruments: Guban; Gaohu; Yangqin; Erhu; Pipa; Sanxian; Dizi; Liuqin; Xiao; Yunluo; Western instruments like cello

Yue opera
- Traditional Chinese: 越劇
- Simplified Chinese: 越剧
Transcriptions
Standard Mandarin
- Hanyu Pinyin: Yuèjù

Shaoxing opera
- Traditional Chinese: 紹興戲
- Simplified Chinese: 绍兴戏
Transcriptions
Standard Mandarin
- Hanyu Pinyin: Shàoxīng xì

Yue opera (Chinese: 越剧; pinyin: Yuèjù), also known as Shaoxing opera, is a popular Chinese opera genre, with only Peking opera considered to be more popular nationwide.

Originating in Shengzhou, Shaoxing, Zhejiang Province in 1906, Yue opera features actresses in male roles as well as femininity in terms of singing, performing, and staging. Despite its rural origin, it has found a second home in Shanghai, China's most affluent city, where it managed to out-compete both Peking opera and the native Shanghai opera. As Yue opera is performed in a variant of Wu, it is most popular in Wu-speaking areas including southern Jiangsu, Zhejiang and Shanghai. In addition, the opera also has a sizeable following in Hong Kong due to Shanghainese migration to the city. Like its performers, Yue opera fans are mainly women, resulting in a disproportionate number of love stories in its repertoire and very little acrobatic fighting.

== History ==
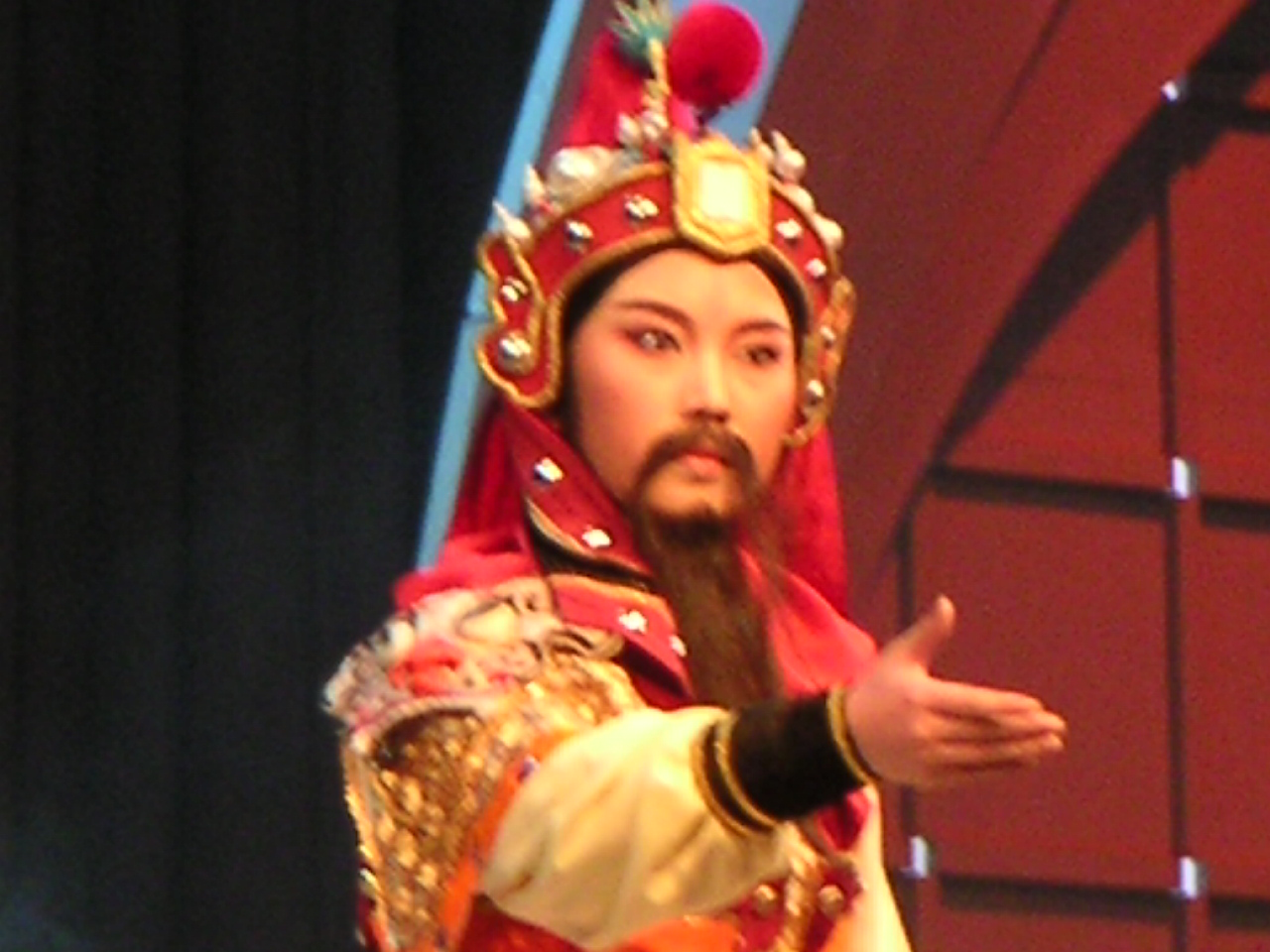
A female contestant playing Han Shizhong during a televised Shaoxing opera talent competition in 2006.

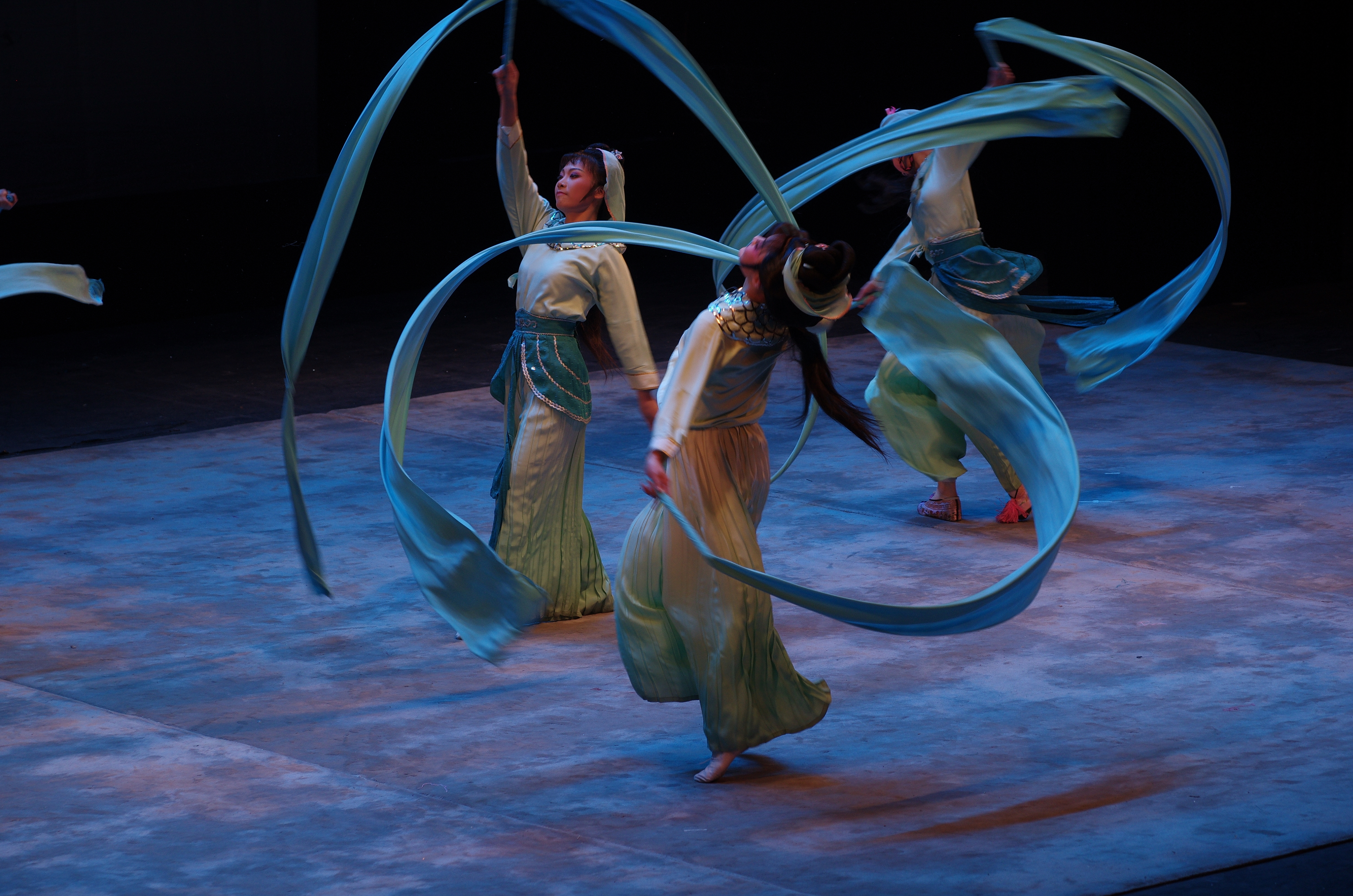
A performance of Yulan Ji by Shanghai Theatre Academy students in 2014.

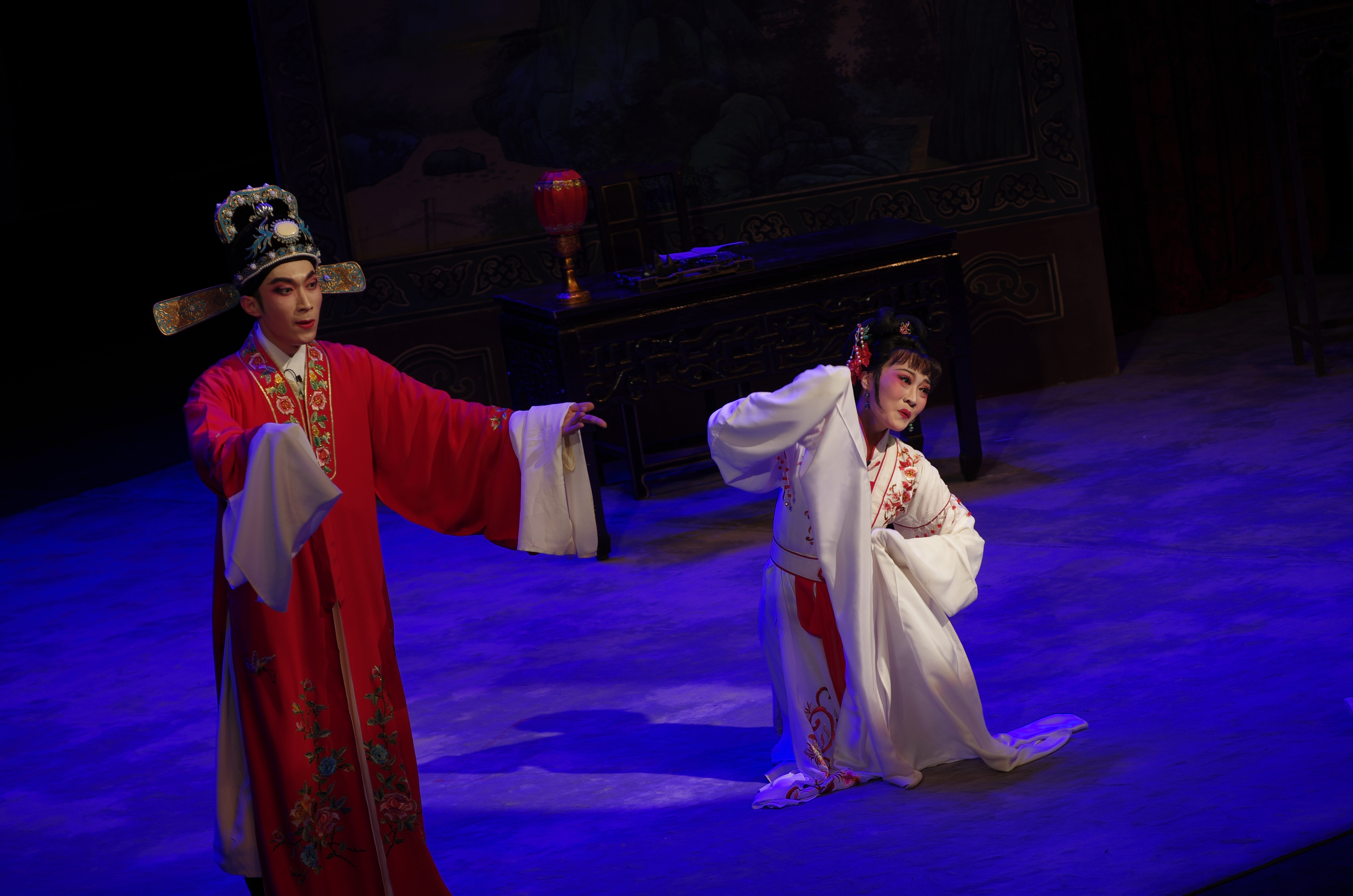
A performance of Wang Kui Betrays Guiying by Shanghai Theatre Academy students in 2014. Male Shaoxing opera actors are few in number but they do exist.

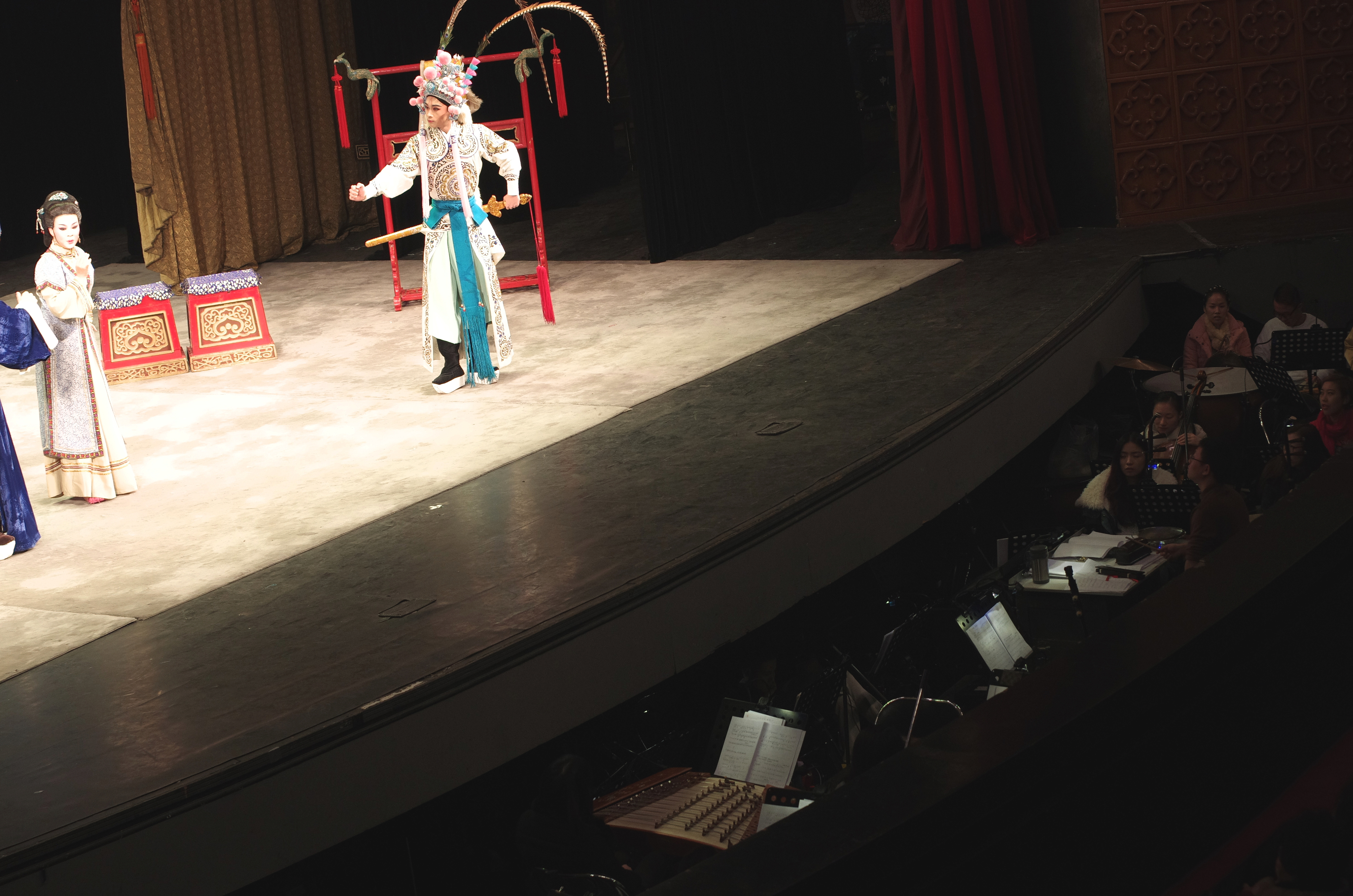
The orchestra accompanying a 2014 performance in Tianchan Theatre, Shanghai. A yangqin player, several huqin players, a percussionist, a cellist, and a "conductor" can be seen.

=== Pre-history ===
Prior to 1906, the antecedent to Yue opera was story-singing. It was initially an entertainment for people in Sheng County. Its lyrics are mostly collected from conversations between farmers while they were working. Audiences loved these ballads because of their vivid description of daily life. The Second Opium War interfered with the local economy of Sheng County, located in the Jiangnan area, near Shanghai. Since Sheng County agriculturalists were experiencing difficulty earning their livelihoods, they started to turn this folk art into a second source of income.

Over years, the accumulation of lyrics built up the fundamental source materials for Yue opera, and the folk music gradually developed its own style. Performers also began to integrate simple acting and accompanying instruments into the folk music. It gradually became well known, both in Sheng County and neighboring counties.

=== Beginnings ===
According to oral history passed down by Yue opera practitioners, Yue opera began in 1906. At the end of the first month of the lunar year, Zhēngyuè (正月), in 1906, artists gathered together at the house of Chen Wanyuan (陈万元). Although these artists usually only performed in groups of two or three and had never performed together before, Chen and other residents encouraged them to put on a joint production instead of multiple separate retelling of the stories. The first performance was thus generated. The show turned out to be a great success, and residents were delighted and willing to talk about it.

Over time more and more counties invited them to perform. Because the music's tones were similar to those of Shange (山歌; Shān Gē), people named this art Small Tunes and Songs Troupes (小歌文书班; Xiao Gē Wén Shū Bān). The "small" in the name referred to its humble folk foundation and contrasted it with "large" formal opera from the area.

Performances were simple. Actors were often peasants who would perform between busy agricultural seasons. They often had no costumes and only a few props, though sometimes rented simple costumes from larger local opera troupes. Musical accompaniment was sparse consisting of only a pair of drums and a wooden clapper played by a performer offstage. This made the performances very mobile allowing the troupes to perform throughout the region. The opera used plain language in the vernacular which made it accessible and popular with local populations.

=== Initial development ===
As "Small Tunes and Songs Troupes" expanded in size and popularity, it entered Shanghai theaters. Due to its unique, elegant and soft singing style compared with other political and spectacular performances, Yue opera found an audience there. It soon changed its name to Shaoxing Civil Opera (pinyin: Shào Xing Wén Xì 绍兴文戏) in 1916, to better represent its performances as art pieces that reflected regional culture. However, both the singing style and banhu fiddle (accompaniment) that the Shaoxing Civil Opera utilized were underdeveloped and vulgar compared with other, more delicate opera genres in Shanghai. It soon lost its prestige and popularity in this big city.

Returning to their roots in Sheng County, Shaoxing Civic Opera performers like Wang Jinshui (王金水, 1879–1944) put great effort into improving their performance and singing style. These artists absorbed the essence of different opera styles including Beijing Opera they had seen in Shanghai. During this process, Four Gong Pitch (四工腔|pinyin: Sì Gōng Qiāng) became the remarkable fruit of this blending. This music pitch is extraordinary because it resolved the unnatural status women have when they play male roles. The Shaoxing Civic Operatic Troupe further developed a systematic training in singing style and sound practice. It utilized erhu and other huqins as alternative accompaniments to adjust music.

=== Women-performed opera ===
When Jinshui Wang came back to Sheng County, he had been deeply impressed by the prosperous artistic atmosphere in Shanghai. Having seen different forms of opera during that time and saw the business opportunities in founding an opera performed by women. In February 1923, he opened an all girls opera class and spent huge amount of money attracting and rewarding young women to join. ("Class" here is an organization in which members work and study at the same time.)

However, the first class existed for only six years. It was transformed into the first professional women's troupe at the end of the girl's apprenticeship. In the 1920s, the social status of both women and arts performers (also known as Xizi, 戏子) was very humble. Governments assumed that operas performed by women would lower the value of the art. Under great pressure and in a limited business market, the first wave of female artists left the class after six years for marriage.

The progress these artists achieved was noteworthy. As the influence of their opera grew, more and more female classes were founded. By the beginning of the 1930s, Zhejiang Province had about two hundred female classes as well and two thousand students.

==== The rise of Shaoxing Literal Opera in the early 1930s ====
There are two well-known explanations for the rise of Shaoxing Literal Opera at that time. One of them is economic incentive. In the early 20th century, young Chinese women had only two options to earn their livelihoods. They were either sent to a wealthy family as a child bride, or to the factories to work. In 1929, the Wall Street crash had tremendous global influence. Many factories in Shanghai closed down, and as a result, women often had no option but to attend female-performed opera classes to earn a living. These women usually received three months acting training, and then participated in performances to gain more experience in acting.

Another explanation was that the performing style of Shaoxing Literal Opera fit with women's nature. As young women tend to be more glorious on stage according to Sheng County's newspaper at that time, the tender and gentle features of Shaoxing Literal Art became more outstanding under such highlighting. Furthermore, Four Gong Qiang worked more vividly and delicately under women's performances.

=== Evolution ===
Originating in the folk song and ballad singing of rural areas in Zhejiang, by drawing on the experience of other developed Chinese opera forms such as Peking opera and Kunqu, Yueju became popular in Shanghai in early 1930s. During the Second Sino-Japanese War, Yueju performers in Shanghai launched a movement to reform the Yueju performance which drew influences from new-style literature (a part of the New Culture Movement) and Western drama and film, making their opera remarkably different from other forms in China. A director-centered system replaced the scene plot system that dictated how a part or scene should be acted. There was an increasing focus on the depiction of the personality and psychology of characters. New operas on new themes were developed including an adaption of Lu Xun's novel "New Year Sacrifice"《祝福》.

After the foundation of People's Republic of China, Yueju was welcomed by the ruling Chinese Communist Party at first, and reached a pinnacle popularity in late 1950s and early 1960s. During this period there was increased emphasis on dramatic realism and expressionism. However, during the Cultural Revolution, like other traditional Chinese art forms, Yueju performances were outlawed, which caused a serious setback in its development. Since the 1980s, Yueju has become popular again, while being challenged by new amusement forms.

Yueju features are elegant and soft, suitable for telling love stories. It was initially performed by men only, but female groups started performing in the style in 1923, and during the 1930s, the form became female-only.

Two Stage Sisters is a 1964 movie featuring Shaoxing Opera. In the new era, Shaoxing opera was included in the national intangible cultural heritage list.

== Notable actors ==
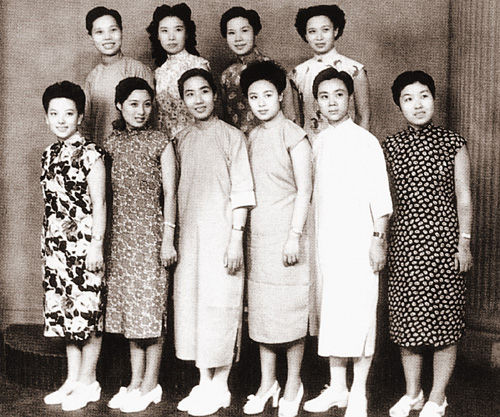
Ten popular performers, dubbed "Ten Sisters", in 1947. Front row (L-R): Xu Tianhong, Fu Quanxiang, Yuan Xuefen, Zhu Shuizhao, Fan Ruijuan, and Wu Xiaolou. Back row (L-R): Zhang Guifeng, Xiao Dangui, Xu Yulan, and Yin Guifang.

- Yuan Xuefen
- Wang Wenjuan
- Fu Quanxiang
- Lv Ruiying
- Zhang Yunxia
- Jin Caifeng
- Qi Yaxian
- Bi Chunfang
- Fan Ruijuan
- Yin Guifang
- Xu Yulan
- Lu Jinhua
- Zhu Shuizhao
- Zhao Zhigang
- Mao Weitao
- Chen Lijun
- Li Yunxiao
