= Fu Quanxiang =

Chinese actress

- Born: Sun Quanxiang; August 23, 1923; Sheng County, Zhejiang, Republic of China
- Died: October 24, 2017 (aged 94); Shanghai, People's Republic of China
- Occupation: Yue opera performer
- Known for: Young dan roles
- Style: Fu school (founder)
- Spouse: Liu Jian (刘健) (m. 1956; died 1979)
- Children: 1

Chinese name
- Chinese: 傅全香
Transcriptions
Standard Mandarin
- Hanyu Pinyin: Fù Quánxiāng

Sun Quanxiang
- Traditional Chinese: 孫泉香
- Simplified Chinese: 孙泉香
Transcriptions
Standard Mandarin
- Hanyu Pinyin: Sūn Quánxiāng

Fu Quanxiang (3 August 1923 – 24 October 2017) was a well-known Chinese actress of Yue opera. In the Chinese press she was named as one of the ten leading female actors in Yue opera. In the view of others she was one of only two truly famous artists, the other being Yuan Xuefen.

Her repertoire included Liang Shanbo and Zhu Yingtai, The Tale of Li Wa, Du Shiniang, and others.
