= Shengzhou =

Shengzhou 嵊州市
- County-level city
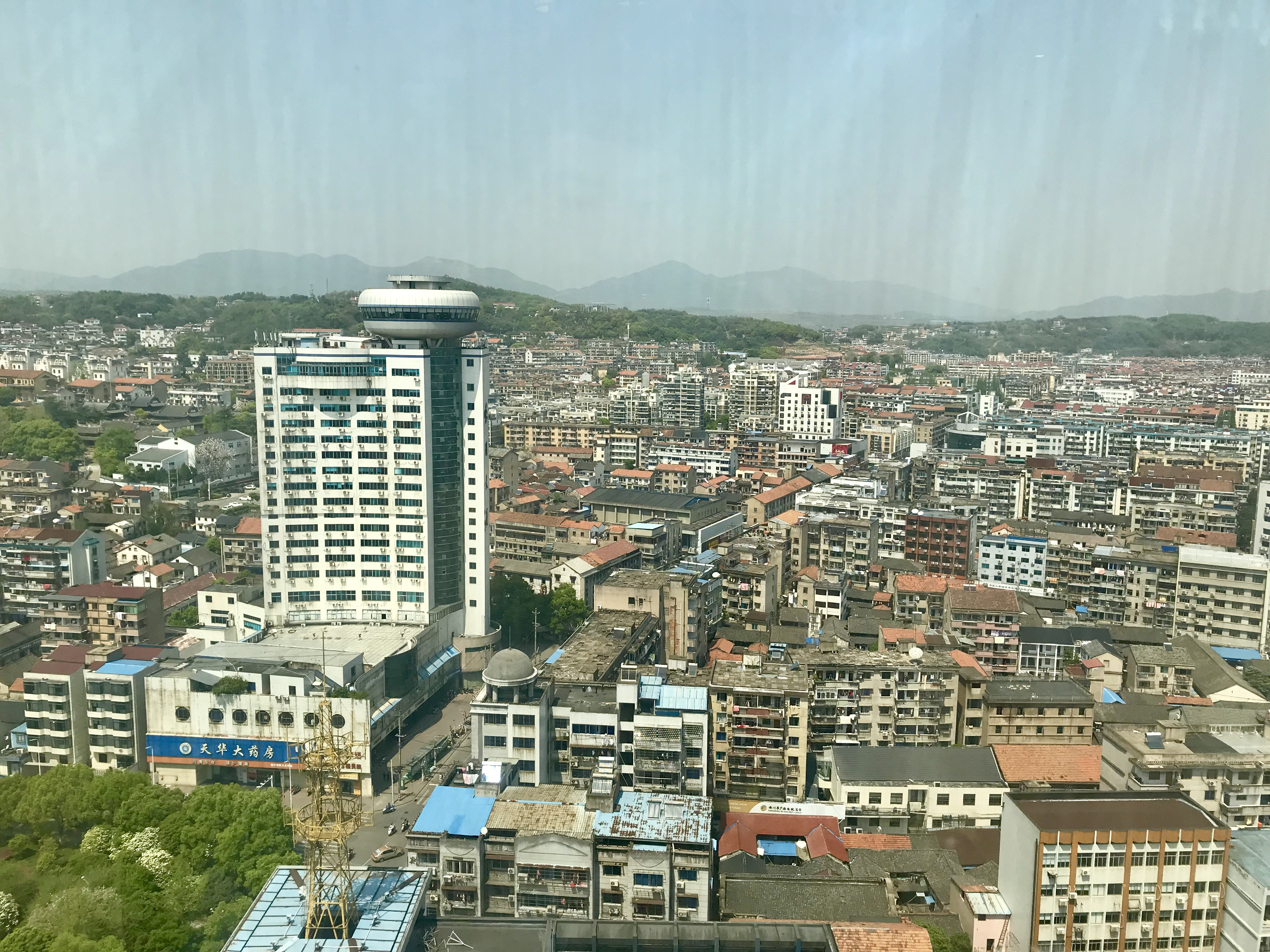

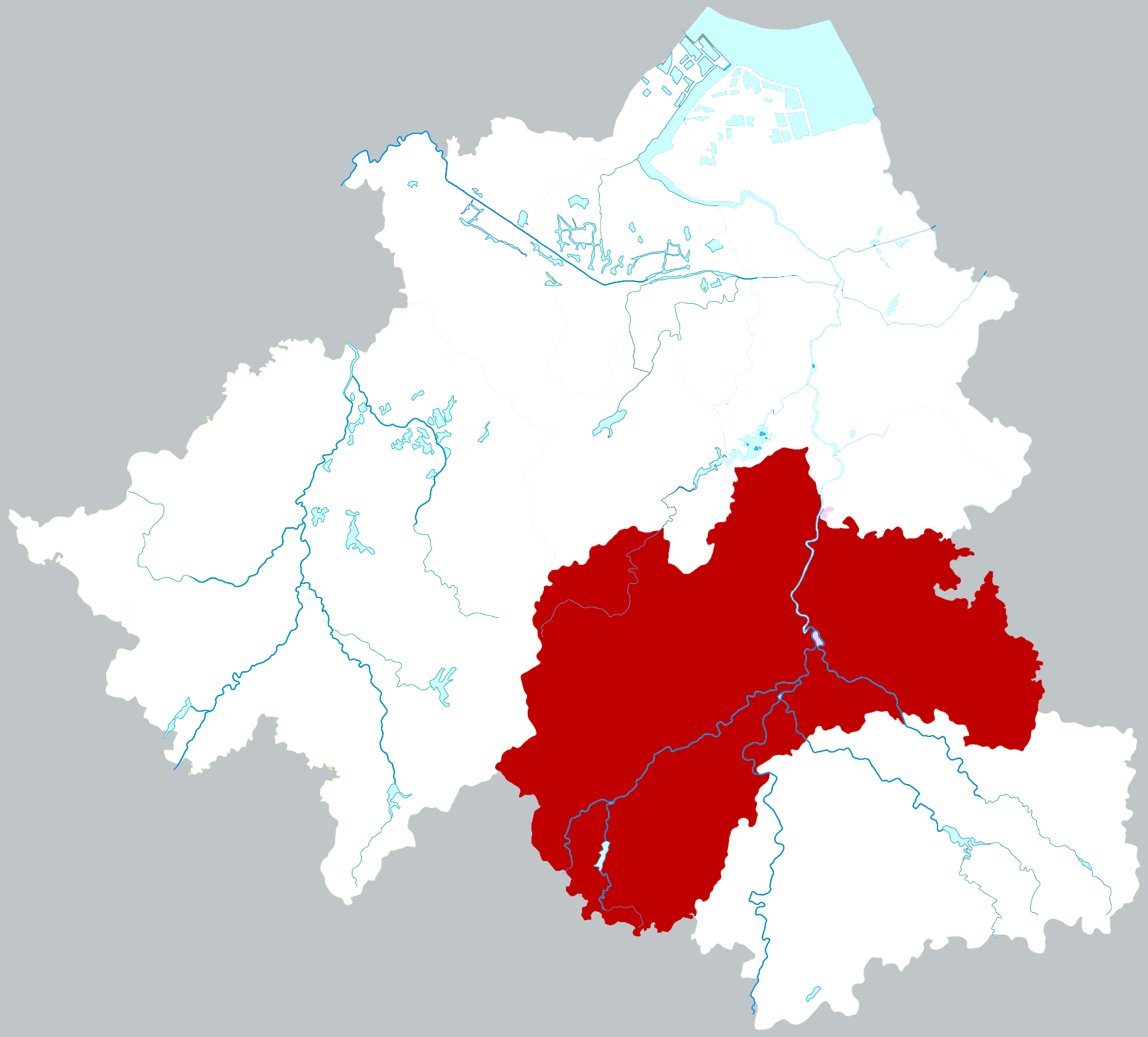
- Location of Shengzhou City within Shaoxing

- Location in Zhejiang
- Coordinates: 29°36′N 120°49′E
- Country: People's Republic of China
- Province: Zhejiang
- Prefecture-level city: Shaoxing

Area
  - County-level city: 1,789.07 km^{2} (690.76 sq mi)
  - Urban: 1,789.07 km^{2} (690.76 sq mi)
  - Metro: 3,002.06 km^{2} (1,159.10 sq mi)

Population (2020 census)
  - County-level city: 675,226
  - Metro: 1,094,262
- Time zone: UTC+8 (China Standard)

Shengzhou (Chinese: 嵊州; pinyin: Shèngzhōu), formerly Shengxian or Sheng County, is a county-level city in central Zhejiang, south of the Hangzhou Bay, and is the south-eastern part of the prefecture-level city of Shaoxing. It is about 1.5 hours drive from the provincial capital of Hangzhou through the Hangzhou-Ningbo, Shangyu-Sanmen Expressway. As of the 2020 census, its population was 675,226, but 1,094,262 lived in the built-up area made of Shengzhou City and Xinchang County largely being conurbated.

== Economy ==
The city is the national and international top producer of ties.

== Art ==
Shengzhou is the origin of the Yue opera, the second most popular Chinese opera.

== Administrative divisions ==
As of 2020, Shengzhou is divided into 4 subdistricts, 10 towns and 1 township.

=== Subdistricts ===
- Shanhu Subdistrict (剡湖街道)
- Sanjiang Subdistrict (三江街道)
- Lushan Subdistrict (鹿山街道)
- Pukou Subdistrict (浦口街道)

=== Towns (镇, zhen) ===
- Ganlin (甘霖)
- Changle (长乐)
- Chongren (崇仁)
- Huangze (黄泽)
- Sanjie (三界)
- Shihuang (石璜)
- Gulai (谷来)
- Xianyan (仙岩)
- Jinting (金庭)
- Xiawang (下王)

=== Township (乡, xiang) ===
- Guimen (贵门)

== Climate ==
Climate data for Shengzhou, elevation 104 m (341 ft), (1991–2020 normals, extremes 1981–present)
Month	Jan	Feb	Mar	Apr	May	Jun	Jul	Aug	Sep	Oct	Nov	Dec	Year
Record high °C (°F)	24.2 (75.6)	28.9 (84.0)	34.2 (93.6)	34.8 (94.6)	36.6 (97.9)	37.8 (100.0)	41.2 (106.2)	40.8 (105.4)	39.7 (103.5)	35.9 (96.6)	31.8 (89.2)	25.7 (78.3)	41.2 (106.2)
Mean daily maximum °C (°F)	9.3 (48.7)	12.0 (53.6)	16.4 (61.5)	22.6 (72.7)	27.0 (80.6)	29.4 (84.9)	34.2 (93.6)	33.4 (92.1)	28.8 (83.8)	23.8 (74.8)	18.2 (64.8)	11.9 (53.4)	22.3 (72.0)
Daily mean °C (°F)	5.0 (41.0)	7.1 (44.8)	11.1 (52.0)	16.8 (62.2)	21.6 (70.9)	24.8 (76.6)	28.9 (84.0)	28.2 (82.8)	24.0 (75.2)	18.7 (65.7)	13.2 (55.8)	7.2 (45.0)	17.2 (63.0)
Mean daily minimum °C (°F)	1.9 (35.4)	3.6 (38.5)	7.2 (45.0)	12.4 (54.3)	17.4 (63.3)	21.4 (70.5)	25.0 (77.0)	24.6 (76.3)	20.6 (69.1)	14.9 (58.8)	9.4 (48.9)	3.6 (38.5)	13.5 (56.3)
Record low °C (°F)	−7.6 (18.3)	−6.3 (20.7)	−3.3 (26.1)	0.1 (32.2)	7.9 (46.2)	11.4 (52.5)	18.1 (64.6)	17.9 (64.2)	11.8 (53.2)	2.3 (36.1)	−3.4 (25.9)	−9.5 (14.9)	−9.5 (14.9)
Average precipitation mm (inches)	74.2 (2.92)	75.9 (2.99)	128.3 (5.05)	119.1 (4.69)	125.5 (4.94)	247.2 (9.73)	124.4 (4.90)	168.6 (6.64)	110.1 (4.33)	56.1 (2.21)	68.4 (2.69)	57.3 (2.26)	1,355.1 (53.35)
Average precipitation days (≥ 0.1 mm)	12.6	12.0	15.6	14.8	14.2	16.9	11.4	14.4	11.9	7.8	10.6	10.2	152.4
Average snowy days	4.2	3.1	1.0	0.1	0	0	0	0	0	0	0.1	1.6	10.1
Average relative humidity (%)	76	74	73	71	73	81	74	77	79	76	77	74	75
Mean monthly sunshine hours	97.8	100.3	119.6	144.8	156.2	125.5	221.7	203.7	150.9	149.7	115.3	111.2	1,696.7
Percentage possible sunshine	30	32	32	37	37	30	52	50	41	43	36	35	38
Source: China Meteorological Administration

== Transportation ==
- Shengzhou North railway station
- Shengzhou Xinchang railway station

== Food ==
Shengzhou is famous for its variety of local snacks and southeast China style dishes. Examples include: Xiaolongbao (小笼包), Doufubao (豆腐包), Youtiao, and Shengzhou Chaoniangao (嵊州炒年糕).
