= Lo Lieh filmography =

Films featuring Hong Kong film actor Lo Lieh

Filmography for the Indo-Chinese Hong Kong film actor and martial artist Lo Lieh:

- Wan hua ying chun (1964) - Extra in nightclub (uncredited)
- Hu die bei (1965) - General Shih
- Temple of the Red Lotus (1965) - Tu Chuang
- The Twin Swords (1965) - Tu Chuang
- Tiger Boy (1966) - Chin Peng
- The Magnificent Trio (1966) - Yen Tzu-ching
- The Sword and the Lute (1967) - Tu Ying
- The Thundering Sword (1967) - Cheng Kun-yuen
- Ru xia (1967) - Han General (Guest star)
- Trapeze Girl (1967) - Liu Yao-wu
- King Cat (1967) - Hua Chung
- One-Armed Swordsman (1967) - Master Wan / The Fox
- Golden Swallow (1968) - Iron Whip Han Tao
- The Singing Thief (1969) - Wang Guo Ji
- Twelve Deadly Coins (1969) - Chiao Mao
- Dragon Swamp (1969) - Yu Jiang
- The Flying Dagger (1969) - Yang Ching
- The Invincible Fist (1969) - Tieh Wu-ching
- Brothers Five (1970) - Kao Hsia - 5th brother
- Valley of the Fangs (1970)
- Swordswomen Three (1970) - Chu Tien Hsiang
- The Chinese Boxer (1970) - Kitashima
- Duel for Gold (1971) - 'Lone Shadow' Teng Chi Yan
- The Rescue (1971) - Lo Ho-wu
- Wan jian chuan xin (1971) - Chin Liang
- Xia shi hang (1971) - Fan Yi
- The Swift Knight (1971) - Lei Yu Feng
- The Lady Hermit (1971) - Wu Chang-chun
- The Lizard (1972)
- King Boxer (1972) - Chao Chih-Hao
- The 14 Amazons (1972) - 5th Prince
- Trilogy of Swordsmanship (1972) - Pang Xun
- The Fugitive (1972)
- Niu gui she shen (1973)
- Xiang Gang shi de tou qing (1973)
- Kiss of Death (1973) - Wong Ta
- Devil and Angel (1973, Director) - Tong-Sen
- Supermen Against the Orient (1973) - Master Tang
- The Bamboo House of Dolls (1973) - Tsui Kuo-Tung
- Qing Kung (1973)
- Nu ji zhong ying (1973) - Tsui Kuo-Tung
- Long hu hui feng yun (1973) - Fan Tien-hu
- Wei ji si fu (1974)
- Heung gong chat sup sam (1974) - Reception desk policeman
- La Brute Le Colt et Karate (Blood Money) (1974) *Kidnap (1974) - Lung Wei
- Concrete Jungle (1974) - ? (scenes deleted)
- Tian wang (1974) - Lung Wei
- Xiao hai yu gou, Ai (1974)
- Mistery in Hongkong (1974)
- Jin sha shou (1974)
- The Stranger and the Gunfighter (1974) - Ho Chiang
- Five Shaolin Masters (1974)
- Night of the Devil's Bride (1975) - Kao Tien
- A Debt of Crime (1975)
- Gambling Syndicate (1975) - Prison Warden (Guest star)
- Lady of the Law (1975)
- Black Magic (1975) - Lang Jiajie
- Jin san jiao (1975) - Tony Wong
- Biao qi fei yang (1975) - Ling Hsiao
- Fists of Dragons (1975)
- Xiang gang qi an (1976) - Chen Chung (Part 3)
- Fierce Fist (1976) - Ku Shun
- Wanglyong (1976) - Wangryang
- Killer Clans (1976) - Han Tang
- The Dragon Missile (1976) - Szema Chun
- Gugje gyeonchal (1976)
- The Magic Blade (1976) - Yen Nan-fei
- The Web of Death (1976) - Snake unit chief, Lu Shen
- Black Magic 2 (1976) - Kang Cong
- Invisible Terrorist (1976)
- The Big Boss Part II (1976) - Cheng Chao-Chun
- One Armed Swordsman Against Nine Killers (1976) - Shao Si Yu
- Bruce's Deadly Fingers (1976)
- Seven Men of Kung Fu (1976)
- Dirty Ho (1976) - General Liang
- Knife of Devil's Roaring and Soul Missing (1976)
- Super Dragon (1976)
- Men of the Hour (1977)
- Long Wei shan zhuang (1977) - Sung Cheng-hsi
- Executioners from Shaolin (1977) - The White-Browed Hermit
- Shui ling long (1977)
- Jade Tiger (1977) - Tang Chueh
- The Face Behind The Mask (1977) - Leng Yen-ching
- Killer from Above (1977)
- Return of Bruce (1977) - Sakata Chiro's Brother
- The Chivalry Gunman and Killer (1977)
- Death Duel (1977) - Hero Huang Ting
- Invincible Swordswoman (1977)
- Fist of Fury II (1977) - Miyamoto
- Qing tian jian piao xiang (1977) - Tung-Fang Ming-Liang
- Zheng He xia xi yang (1977)
- Ren ba zhao (1977)
- Wanglyong 2 (1977)
- The Damned (1977) - Pao Cheng-fang
- Pursuit of Vengeance (1977)
- Great Chase (1977)
- 18 Swirling Riders (1977) - Master Mui
- Wu xing ba quan (1977)
- Tiger Love (1977)
- Long quan xiao zi (1977)
- Ji tian jian piao xiang (1977)
- Jiang Nan ba da xia (1977)
- Hei dai kong shou dao (1977)
- Guan dong wu ta xia (1977) - Mr. Cher
- Da wu shi yu xiao piao ke (1977)
- Prominent Eunuch Chen Ho (1977)
- Heroes of Shaolin (1977)
- Greatest Plot (1977) - Marshal Nien
- Showdown at the Equator (1978)
- Flying Guillotine Part 2 (1978) - Suen Pao-ying
- The 36th Chamber of Shaolin (1978) - General Tien Ta
- Vengeful Beauty (1978) - Chin Kang-Feng / Guillotine squad leader
- Shaolin Handlock (1978) - Ling Hao
- Immortal Warriors (1978)
- Murder of Murders (1978) - Ran Chen Feng
- Heaven Sword and Dragon Sabre (1978) - Xie Xun, the Golden Hair Lion King
- Yi tian tu long ji da jie ju (1978)
- Little Hero (1978)
- Daesaboo (1978)
- Chilhyeobpalui (1978)
- Solimsa Mok-ryeon dosa (1978)
- Tong tian lao shu xia jiang nan (1978)
- Born Invincible (1978) - Ku Yu Tieh
- Zodiac Fighters (1978)
- Qi xia ba yi (1978)
- Manhunt (1978) - Mongol commander
- My Blade, My Life (1978)
- Three Shaolin Musketeers (1978)
- Red Phoenix (1978) - Ku Chuan
- Revenge of the Shaolin Kid (1978) - Kim Man-kang
- The Cavalier (1978) - War Minister Kung
- Fatal Needles vs. Fatal Fists (1978) - Captain Chow Lung
- Lung Wei Village (1978) - Zeng Canghai
- Fists of Bruce Lee (1978)
- The Swift Shaolin Boxer (1978)
- The Idiot Swordsman (1979)
- Du jiao he (1979)
- The Reckless Cricket (1979) - Old Man
- Ge shi ge fa (1979)
- Murder Plot (1979) - Ge-hsi Wang
- Abbot of Shaolin (1979) - Pai Mei
- Scorching Sun, Fierce Winds, Wild Fire (1979) - Ta Fu
- Young Dragon (1979)
- Shou kou (1979)
- Mad Monkey Kung Fu (1979) - Tuan
- Black Belt Karate (1979) - Japanese Karate Expert
- The Eighteen Jade Arhats (1979) - Ku Ying-Pong
- Fists and Guts (1979) - Housekeeper / Tibetan Monk
- Ape Girl (1979)
- Green Dragon Inn (1979)
- Shen bu (1979) - Liu Te-kao
- Eunuch of the Western Palace (1979)
- Drunken Arts and Crippled Fist (1979)
- Clan Of The White Lotus (1980, Director) - Priest White Lotus
- Swift Sword (1980)
- Rendezvous with Death (1980) - Beggar Yang Fung
- Dangerous Encounters of the First Kind (1980) - Tan
- Jade Fox (1980)
- Emperor of Shaolin Kung Fu (1980) - Liang
- Secret of Chinese Kung Fu (1980)
- Return of the Sentimental Swordsman (1981) - Hu Bu-Kuei
- Return of the Deadly Blade (1981)
- Revenge of the Corpse (1981)
- The Story of Woo Viet (1981) - Sarm
- Emperor and His Brother (1981) - Zhao Zhao-zhong
- Tong jun le (1981)
- Notorious Eight (1981) - Hu Kuan Tien
- Dangerous Person (1981) - 7th Uncle
- Ninja Pirates (1981)
- Ninja Supremo (1981)
- What Price Honesty? (1981)
- Winner Takes All (1982)
- Kung Fu from beyond the Grave (1982) - Kam Tai Fu
- Long tou lao da (1982)
- The Lawman (1982)
- Perils of the Sentimental Swordsman (1982)
- The Spirit of the Sword (1982) - Fire Clan chief
- Human Lanterns (1982) - Chao Chun-Fang
- Buddha's Palm (1982) - Pi Gu
- Flash Legs (1982) - Scarred Dragon
- Mercenaries from Hong Kong (1982) - Lei Tai
- Eagle's Claw and Butterfly Palm (1982) - Chek / Butterfly Clan Prince
- The Enchantress (1983) - Master Ku
- Ghosts Galore (1983) - Magician Lien
- The Black Magic with Buddha (1983, Director) - Sorcerer
- Hong Kong, Hong Kong (1983)
- The Hidden Power of the Dragon Sabre (1983)
- Little Dragon Maiden (1983)
- Deadly Kick (1983, Director)
- Family Light Affair (1984) - Ping
- Return of Bastard Swordsman (1984) - Ghost Doctor Lan Xin Zu
- Secret Service of the Imperial Court (1984)
- The Occupant (1984) - Mr. Chan
- I will Finally Knock You Down, Dad (1984) - Father of the Bride
- Crazy Shaolin Disciple (1985) - Chef Chih Lien-Chia
- Chao ling chu nan (1985)
- Mo deng shen tan (1985)
- How to Choose a Royal Bride (1985) - Nalan Xiu Ji
- Let Us Flirt, Partner (1985, Writer / Director only)
- Oh, My God (1985) - Inspector Lui / Superman
- Zen Master 6 (1987, Producer / Director only)
- Dragons Forever (1988) - Triad Gangster Boss (uncredited)
- On the Run (1988) - Hsi
- City War (1988) - Uncle Kuen
- Lóng quán mì gông (1988)
- Edge of Darkness (1988) - Choi
- Miracles (1989) - Fei
- Seven Warriors (1989) - Piu
- Bin yuen sui yuet (1989) - Tai
- Just Heroes (1989) - Law
- Life Is Cheap... But Toilet Paper Is Expensive (1989) - Pianist
- The Truth Final Episode (1989)
- Ghost Ballroom (1989) - Mr. Lo
- Path of Glory (1989) - Big Mouth Wa
- A Fiery Family (1989) - Law Chung Lit
- Fatal Passion (1990)
- Luan shi er nu (1990) - Pai
- Return to Action (1990)
- Miao jie huang hou (1990) - Elvis
- Wu ming jia zu (1990) - Triad Boss
- In the Line of Duty 5: Middle Man (1990) - Alan's Godfather
- Tiger Cage 2 (1990) - Uncle Chiu
- Forsaken Cop (1990)
- Blood Stained Tradewinds (1990)
- Bullet for Hire (1990) - Ngok
- Bo Hao (1991) - Tin
- Ng foo cheung: Kuet lit (1991) - Chiu Chow
- Chung gik tin ji moon sang (1991) - Sam
- Sex and Zen (1991) - Choi Kun-Lun
- Hei xing feng yun (1991) - Boss
- Police Story 3: Super Cop (1992) - The General
- Wu hu si hai (1992) - Chi
- Qi an shi lu bai se tong dao (1992)
- Du wang zhi zun (1992) - Low
- Shen Jing Dao yu Fei Tian Mao(1993) - Sudden Death
- Yuk fung (1993) - Kwan
- Sheng gang da zhui ji (1993) - Inspector Bai
- Huo zhong (1993) - Tiger Wan
- Zui sang mung sei: Wan Chai ji foo (1994) - Kui
- Hei se zou lang (1994)
- Hubungan jenayah (1995)
- Fist of Fury (1995, TV Series)
- ei yan bong: Chin ng gau sai (1999) - Mo's Dad
- Glass Tears (2001) - Wu
- The Vampire Combat (2001) - Wei Tung's Uncle (final film role)
