= List of TVB series (1977) =

This is a list of series released by or aired on TVB Jade Channel in 1977.

Airing date	English title (Chinese title)	Number of episodes	Main cast	Theme song (T) Sub-theme song (ST)	Genre	Sources
1 May	The Great Vendetta 大報復	67	Adam Cheng, Gigi Wong, Candice Yu, Damian Lau, Angie Chiu, Yuen San Wong, Bill Chan	T: "大報復" (Adam Cheng)	Modern drama	
1 August	A House Is Not a Home 家變	110	Liza Wang, Tang Pik Wan, Bak Man Biu, Simon Yam, Nam Hung, Ha Yu, Lee Heung Kam	T: "家變" (Roman Tam)	Modern drama	
