= 流星蝴蝶劍 =

流星蝴蝶劍 or 流星蝴蝶剑, literally 'Meteor', 'Butterfly', 'Sword', may refer to:

- Killer Clans, 1976 Hong Kong martial arts
- Liuxing Hudie Jian, a wuxia novel by Gu Long
