= Teresa Ha =

Chinese actress from Hong Kong (1937–2019)

- Chinese: 夏萍
- Born: 6 October 1937; Hong Kong
- Died: 5 August 2019 (aged 81)
- Other names: Ha Ping, Hsia Ping, Xia Ping, Teresa Ha Ping, Teresa Loo, Lu Shao-Ping, Sar Pang, Lo Siu-Ping
- Occupation: Actress
- Years active: 1956–2019
- Spouse: Wan Cheung (m. 1970–1991)
- Children: 2
- Awards: TVB Anniversary Award for Lifetime Achievement

Teresa Ha (Chinese: 夏萍) (October 6, 1937 – August 5, 2019) was a former Chinese television and film actress from Hong Kong. Ha is credited with over 260 films.

== Career ==
In 1956, Ha started her acting career in Hong Kong films. Ha first appeared in The Soul Stealer, a 1956 Crime film directed by Ng Wui. Ha's last film was I Love You, Mom, a 2013 film directed by Casey Chan Lai-Ying. Ha is credited with over 260 films.

Ha joined TVB in 1982 and remained active at the station until 2016. She won an award at the 2005 TVB Anniversary Gala Show.

== Filmography ==
=== Films ===
- 1956 The Soul Stealer - Yan Fung
- 1957 Caught in the Act - Ching Wai-Fong
- 1957 Little Women - Mung-Seong
- 1957 Love's Crime
- 1958 May Heaven Bless You - Leung Tsi-Yuk
- 1958 Driver No. 7 - Cheung Kit-Ying / Mimi
- 1958 Mambo Lady
- 1958 Three Scholars Rival for a Wife
- 1959 Daughter of a Grand Household (a.k.a. The Missing Cinderella) - Sima Hung / Lily
- 1959 Dear Love - Fong Wan-Kam / Kam
- 1959 The Cruel Husband - Ha Mei Ling
- 1960 The Three Girl Fighters (Part 1)
- 1960 The Three Girl Fighters (Part 2)
- 1960 A Tearful Life - Sook-Jun
- 1960 Salvation - Chun
- 1960 The Wonder Boy
- 1960 The Outcast Woman (Part 2) - Pak Yuen-Yee
- 1961 Non-sensical Son-in-law - Fung Oi
- Many Aspects of Love (1961) - Lok Ha
- House of Kam Topples (Part 1) (1961) - Pak Sau-Chu
- House of Kam Topples (Part 2) (1961)
- Conflict in Phoenix Hill (1961)
- Time Flows Like a Stream (1962) - Mai Gam-Fa
- This Merry World (1962)
- Temporary Couple (1962)
- The Drifting Orphan (1962)
- Sombre Night (1962) - Tin Yee-Mui
- Sad Tale of Two Women (1962)
- How Cai Shu Subdued the Tyrant (1962)
- To Capture the God of Wealth (1962) - Chun Yun-Lan
- Sunset on the River (1962) - Chung Kwai Fong / Siu Heung
- Husband of a Rich Lady (1962)
- The Fake Married Couple (1962) - Cheong Chi-Fan
- The Wife's Husband (1962)
- One Queen and Three Kings (1963) - Si Sau-Ha
- Wife and Mistress in the Same House (1963) - Chiu Chung Ying / Mrs Chan
- Bedside Horror (1963)
- House of Prosperity (1963) - Man-Choi
- The Adventures of a Strange Man (1963) - Cheung Lei Suk-Lin
- Take the Money and Run (1963) - Kam Lan Chi
- Midnight Were-wolf (1963) - Choi Ching-Chi
- Women's World (1963) - Cheung Yuk-Kam
- The Songstresses (1963) - Tong Siu-Chun
- A Modern Girl (1963) - Lei Suk-Lin
- 1964 Men and Women - Meiling
- 1964 Getting Rich
- 1964 In the Neighbourhood - Ah Fung
- 1964 Luck Is with You
- 1964 Money for Marriage
- 1964 Half a Bed
- 1964 Take What You Can
- 1964 Pigeon Cage
- 1964 A Beautiful Ghost
- 1964 The Witty Sister
- 1964 A Big Restaurant
- 1964 A Girl's Tears
- 1964 Grab What You Can!
- 1964 My Darling Grandchild
- 1964 Spy No. 13 - Mak Siu-Guen
- 1964 All Are Happy
- Silent Love (1965) - Yu Pak-Mui
- Seven Unruly Girls (1965) - Ah Ping
- Blundering Detective (1965) - Tong Kam-Tim
- Moonlight (1965)
- A Tough World (1965)
- All Packed in a Small House (1965)
- Pursuit of the Murderer in the Dog-racing Court (1965) - Cheung Lai-bing
- Between Man and Ghost (1965)
- The Espionage (1966)
- The Secret Agent and the Mysterious Gang (1966) - Chiu Lai-Jan
- Pursuit of a Murderer (1966) - Cheung Man-Wai
- How Master Cute Thrice Saved the Idiot Ming (1966) - Siu Chi
- Spy Vs. Spy (1966)
- The Car Owner (1966)
- The Strange Hero Yi Zhimei (1967)
- Tragedy in a Fishing Village (1967)
- Paragon of Sword and Knife (1967)
- Prodigal in Distress (1967)
- Incredible Rumour (1968) - Mei-Lian
- Hotel Blues (1968) - Zaza
- Won't You Give Me a Kiss? (1968) - Honey
- Joy to the World (1968) - Yam Yuk-zi
- Red Lamp Shaded in Blood (1968) - Bak Mun-ping
- The Vengeful Spirit (1968)
- Getting Rich in a Blind Way (1968) - Suk-lan's mother
- Paragon of Sword and Knife (Grand Finale) (1968)
- Blue Falcon (1968)
- The Admirers of the Girl in the Mini-skirt (1968) - Cheng's wife
- Two Sisters Who Steal (1969) - Wong Man-Lan
- The Smart Master and the Shrewd Rich Girl (1969) - Chow Yuk-Mui
- Where the Dragon Dares (1969)
- Teddy Girls (1969) - Tsui's mother
- A Child in Need of a Mother's Love (1969)
- The Romantic Girl Who Plays Hard-to-Get (1969) - Ah Kiu
- The Liar (1969) - Jenny
- 1970 Love Song Over the Sea - Chang Gai-yun
- 1970 Apartment for Ladies - Lulu.
- The Golden Seal (1971) - Feng Hui Ming
- Call to Arms (1971) - Lady Ping Yuan Chun
- It Takes a Man to Be Henpecked (1971)
- Let's Go to Bed (1972)
- The 14 Amazons (1972) - Tung Yueh Ngo
- Yu zhong hua (1972)
- Flower in the Rain (1972) - Ah Ying
- 1973 Dao bing fu - Lady Ping Yuan-chun
- 1973 Facets of Love - Old Fo
- 1973 Tales of Larceny (Part 2) - Lu Shu Zhen
- 1973 River of Fury - Opera troupe member
- 1973 Illicit Desire (Part 2) - Sun Xue-Bo (wife #4)
- 1973 The Sugar Daddies - Mrs. Fung
- The Golden Lotus (1974) - Fourth lady / Sun Hsueh o
- Thirteen (1974) - Lan Ching
- Heung gong chat sup sam (1974)
- Sex for Sale (1974) - Mrs. Ou
- Hong Kong 73 (1974) - Lee Mei Ying
- Sinful Confession (1974) - Mahjong gambler
- The Tea House (1974) - Auntie Tan
- Ghost Eyes (1974) - Yuen Man
- Kidnap (1974) - Ah Chen
- Ai xin jian wan wan (1975) - Mrs. Su
- Night of the Devil's Bride (1975) - Nurse of Cui's house
- Carry on Con Men (1975)
- The Big Holdup (1975) - Ying
- Two Con Men (1975) - [Scenes cut]
- Evil Seducers (1975) - Buddhist nun
- My Bewitched Wife (1975) - Mrs. Wong
- Big Brother Cheng (1975) - Tan Yi
- Temperament of Life (1975)
- Cuties Parade (1975)
- Love Lock (1975) - Zhou's mother
- The Spiritual Boxer (1975) - Lin's wife
- The Wedding Night (1975)
- It's All in the Family (1975) - Susan's mother
- The Playboy (1975)
- The Criminals (1976) (Part 2) - Auntie Eight
- King Gambler (1976) - Mrs Sha Wu Lin
- Spirit of the Raped (1976) - Fan's wife
- Killer Clans (1976) - Yu Hsia
- Wedding Nights (1976) - Granny Wang
- Beautiful Vixen (1976) - Mrs. Huang
- Emperor Chien Lung (1976) - Madam Ping, the witch
- Love Swindler (1976) (Part 3) - Looking at Jade Ring
- Big Bad Sis (1976) - Ah Fong's mother
- The Escort Girls (1976)
- The Magic Blade (1976) - Devil Grandma
- Hustler from Canton (1976)
- Du wang da pian ju (1976)
- Clans of Intrigue (1977) - Su Xian Xian
- Assault - The Criminals, Part IV (1977) (Part 2) - Liu Gu
- Ren she shu (1977)
- Death Duel (1977) - Mute's wife
- The Battle Wizard (1977) - Chief Zhong's wife
- The Call-Girls (1977) - Dr. Yun's wife
- The Teenager's Nightmare (1977) (Part 2) - Mother of victim
- Dreams of Eroticism (1977) - Zhou Rui
- Chinatown Kid (1977) - Xu Hao's wife
- The Mysterious Heroes (1977) - Lady Hua
- Murder on the Wedding Night (1977)
- Yin xia en chou lu (1978)
- Clan of Amazons (1978) - 2nd Sister
- Heroes of the East (1978) - Wedding guest
- The Proud Youth (1978) - Abbess Yixin
- Shaolin Mantis (1978) - Gi Gi's 1st aunt
- Swordsman and Enchantress (1978) - Old woman in Puppet Villa
- Sensual Pleasures (1978) - Mrs. Jin
- Heaven Sword and Dragon Sabre (1978) - Granny Jin Hwa
- Heaven Sword and Dragon Sabre, Part II (1978) - Granny Jin Hwa / Daisy
- The Mad Monk Strikes Again (1978) - Madam Ba Gu
- Full Moon Scimitar (1979) - Tung's wife
- The Scandalous Warlord (1979) - Generalissimo Feng's mother
- The Deadly Breaking Sword (1979) - Madam Li Xing
- The Ghosts and I (1979)
- Murder Plot (1979) - Chun Qiu
- Heaven and Hell (1980) - Yen
- Disco Bumpkins (1980) - Fan's mother
- Killer Constable (1980) - Ah Niu's wife
- Swift Sword (1980) - Madam Guan
- Rendezvous with Death (1980)
- The Tiger and the Widow (1981) - Auntie Suen
- The Emperor and His Brother (1981) - Chief Chou's wife
- Notorious Eight (1981) - Mrs. Xia
- Bloody Parrot (1981) - Madam Song
- A Bride's Nightmare (1981)
- Revenge of the Corpse (1981) - Lu's servant
- Winner Takes All (1982) - Xi Mo's mother
- Clan Feuds (1982) - Madam Zhu
- Lovers Blades (1982) - Gai Bao's mother
- Hell Has No Boundary (1982) - Madam Chi
- Human Lanterns (1982) - Brothel madam
- The 82 Tenants (1982) - Ah Xia
- Godfather from Canton (1982) - Yu
- My Rebellious Son (1982) - Herbal tea seller
- Ode to Gallantry (1982) - Princess Mei Fanggu
- Pituitary Hunter (1982)
- Twinkle Twinkle Little Star (1983) - Wife of beauty shop owner
- Air Disaster (1983)
- The Rape After (1984) - Nurse Yin
- Pale Passion (1984) - Ah Hsia's mother
- My Lucky Stars (1985) - Ping (Tsao's wife)
- Rose (1986) - Nanny
- The Millionaires' Express (1986) - Cotton weaver's mother
- Lucky Stars Go Places (1986) - Ping
- Life Is a Moment (1987) - Fong's maid
- Evil Cat (1987) - Long's Mom
- Trouble Couples (1987) - Actress on TV
- Into the Fire (1989) - Le's mother
- Final Run (1989)
- Queen of Temple Street (1990) - Older Woman
- Against All (1990) - K. K.'s mother
- The Set Up (1990) - Mother
- Changing Partner (1992) - Yau's grandmother [uncredited]
- To Liv(e) (1992)
- Call Girl '92 (1992) - Nancy's aunt
- Raped by an Angel (1993) - Tat's mother
- Boys Are Easy (1993) - Mrs. Wu
- Love to Kill (1993)
- Ghost Lantern (1993) - Granny Four
- The Kung Fu Scholar (1994) - Granny beggar
- Hail the Judge (1994) - Sing's mother
- Give and Take (1994)
- The Crucifixion (1994) - Yau's mother
- Modern Romance (1994) - Bartender
- The Wrath of Silence (1994) - Chi's master
- Beginner's Luck (1994) - Aunt Lan
- Those Were the Days... (1995) - Ko Fei's mother
- Lover of the Last Empress (1995) - Yu Lan / Tzu Hsi's mother
- Summer Snow (1995) - Mrs. Han
- Tricky Business (1995) - Hospital orderly
- The Saint of Gamblers (1995) - God Bless You's mother
- Heaven Can't Wait (1995) - Chun's grandmother
- O.C.T.B. Case - The Floating Body (1995) - Mother Li
- Full Throttle (1995) - Jiale's grandmother
- Young and Dangerous (1996) - Kwan's mother
- Hong Kong Showgirls (1996) - Mary
- 4 Faces of Eve (1996) - Miu Si's mother
- Blind Romance (1996) - Grandma
- Once Upon a Time in Triad Society 2 (1996) - Keung
- Stooge, My Love (1996) - Auntie San
- Passionate Nights (1997) - Mrs Ma
- Killing Me Tenderly (1997) - Su Kan's mother
- Those Were the Days (1997) - Siu Fong Fong's mother
- Step Into the Dark (1998) - May May's mother
- Love in the River (1998) - Mrs Mill
- Raped by an Angel 2: The Uniform Fan (1998) - Po Wan's grandmother
- Casino (1998) - Wan's mother
- How to Get Rich by Fung Shui? (1998)
- Tales in the Wind (1998)
- Gigolo of Chinese Hollywood (1999) - Kam's mother
- My Good Brother (1999)
- The Legend of Speed (1999) - Kelly's grandmother
- Desirous Express (2000)
- Don't Look Back- Or You'll Be Sorry!! (2000) - Woman passing Marianne in the stairs
- Let It Be (2000)
- Queen of Kowloon (2000) - Heung
- The Accidental Spy (2001) - Cleaner in freight lift
- Fighting for Love (2001) - Mrs. Chuck
- Fing's Raver (2001)
- Gangs 2001 (2001)
- U-Man (2002) - Candy's grandmother
- Hooker's World (2002) - Auntie Luke
- Jiang Hu (2004) - Lefty's mother
- House of the Invisibles (2007) - Wong Po
- Flash Point (2007) - Tony's mother
- Echoes of the Rainbow (2010) - Grandmother
- Life Without Principle (2011)
- I Love You, Mom (2013) - (final film role)

== Personal life ==
Her godson is Gordon Lam. On 5 August 2019, Ha died in her sleep in Hong Kong. She was 81 years old.
