= Tam Ping-man =

Hong Kong actor (1933–2020)

- 譚炳文
- Born: 14 November 1933; British Hong Kong
- Died: 5 September 2020 (aged 86); Ruttonjee Hospital, Wan Chai, Hong Kong
- Occupations: Actor; singer
- Years active: 1950s–2020

Tam Ping-man (14 November 1933 – 5 September 2020) was a Hong Kong actor and singer. With his deep-rooted dubbing work and nurturing talents, he has been full of talents for half a century and has earned him the reputation of "dubbing king". Some of his most famous dubbing work includes being the voice of the U.S. actor Marlon Brando in the movie The Godfather (1972) and Charlie Townsend in the U.S. TV series Charlie's Angels (1976 to 1981). In addition, he was the first horse racing commentator in Hong Kong.

In addition to his dubbing work, Tam was also an actor. He made recurring appearances on the variety show Enjoy Yourself Tonight (EYT) and appeared in several TVB television series, including A House Is Not a Home, Yesterday's Glitter, The Shell Game, and The Misadventure of Zoo.

Tam had a long-time on-screen partner who was also a well known Hong Kong actress, Lee Heung-kam. They co-founded a production company together in 1974.

Tam began acting and appearing in a number of highly-successful movies in the 1970s, including ones by Alex Gouw's Goldig Films such as The Country Bumpkin-In Style.

Tam received the TVB Anniversary Awards - Life Achievement Award in 2014.

On 5 September 2020, Tam died at Ruttonjee Hospital in Wan Chai at the age of 86. He had cancer and was having difficulty breathing before being rushed to the hospital.
