= Chen Ping (actress) =

Taiwanese actress (born 1948)

Chen Ping (Chinese: 陳萍; pinyin: Chén píng; born 1948) is a Taiwanese actress, who has been active in Taiwan and Hong Kong. Her breakout role in Hong Kong exploitation films was in The Kiss of Death (1973), directed by Ho Meng Hua. She also appeared in Ho's Vengeful Beauty (1978).

== Biography ==
Chen Ping was born in Kaohsiung, Taiwan, as Chen Shuxia.

== Filmography ==
- Return of Dragon (1998)
- Take Care, Your Majesty (1983)
- Gambler's Delight (1981)
- Notorious Eight (1981)
- One Way Only (1981)
- Murder Plot (1979)
- The Psychopath (1978)
- Sensual Pleasures (1978)
- Shaolin Handlock (1978)
- The Vengeful Beauty (1978)
- The Adventures Of Emperor Chien Lung (1977)
- The Call Girls (1977)
- Death Duel (1977)
- Lady Exterminator (1977)
- The Mighty Peking Man (1977)
- Pursuit Of Vengeance (1977)
- Beautiful Vixen (1976)
- Big Bad Sis (1976)
- Crazy Sex (1976)
- The Drug Connection (1976)
- The Girlie Bar (1976)
- Killer Clans (1976)
- King Gambler (1976)
- The Last Tempest (1976)
- Love Swindlers (1976)
- Moods of Love (1976)
- The Oily Maniac (1976)
- Wedding Nights (1976)
- Black Magic (1975)
- Cuties Parade (1975)
- Forbidden Tales Of Two Cities (1975)
- The Hooker and The Hustler (1975)
- The Imposter (1975)
- Night Of The Devil's Bride (1975)
- Queen Hustler (1975)
- The Stranger and the Gunfighter (1975)
- That's Adultery ! (1975)
- Two Con Men (1975)
- The Golden Lotus (1974)
- Hong Kong 73 (1974)
- Mini-Skirt Gang (1974)
- The Sinful Adulteress (1974)
- The Two Faces Of Love (1974)
- Women Of Desire (1974)
- Illicit Desire (1973)
- The Kiss of Death (1973)
- The Master Of Kung Fu (1973)
- Sexy Playgirls (1973)
- Tiger Boxer (1973)
- Dangerous Game (1972)
- Love Secret (1971)
- Cold Blade (1970)
- Dream of the Red Chamber (1962)
