= The Call Girls (1977 film) =

1977 Hong Kong film by Cheng Kang

The Call Girls 應召名冊
- Film poster
- Directed by: Cheng Kang
- Screenplay by: Li Yung-Chang
- Produced by: Runme Shaw
- Starring: Chen Ping; Danny Lee; Shirley Yu
- Cinematography: Yu Chi
- Edited by: Chiang Hsing-Lung
- Music by: Chen Yung-Yu
- Production company: Shaw Brothers Studio
- Release date: 30 September 1977 (Hong Kong)
- Running time: 87 minutes
- Country: Hong Kong
- Language: Mandarin

The Call Girls (Chinese: 應召名冊) is a 1977 Hong Kong drama film produced by the Shaw Brothers Studio. The film was a top ten box office hit in 1977 in Hong Kong.

== Cast ==
- Chen Ping
- Danny Lee
- Shirley Yu
- Si Wai
- Chan Shen
- Cheng Miu
- Ha Ping
- Chiang Nan
- Lam Fai Wong
- Wong Jing Jing

== See also ==
- Prostitution in Hong Kong
