= All's Well, Ends Well 1997 =

1997 Hong Kong film by Alfred Cheung

- DVD cover
- Directed by: Alfred Cheung
- Written by: Raymond Wong; Guk Chiu
- Produced by: Raymond Wong
- Starring: Stephen Chow; Raymond Wong; Francis Ng; Roy Chiao; Christine Ng; Wu Chien-lien; Christy Chung
- Cinematography: Tam Chi-Wai
- Edited by: Poon Hung
- Music by: Tang Siu-Lam
- Production company: Eastern Bright Motion Picture Ltd.
- Distributed by: Mandarin Films Ltd.
- Release date: 6 February 1997
- Running time: 90 minutes
- Country: Hong Kong
- Language: Cantonese
- Box office: HK$40,162,050

All's Well, Ends Well 1997 or abbreviated as AWEW 1997 (97家有囍事) is a Hong Kong comedy film directed by Alfred Cheung, starring Stephen Chow, Raymond Wong and Francis Ng.

== Plot ==
Kung (Stephen Chow) is the spoiled youngest brother of three: no job, no education, plenty of money, plenty of girlfriends, and a good home, whom he shares with the two brothers Lo Leung and Fei, his sister-in-law Yinsu (Lo Leung's unattractive wife), and his wise father, Mr. Lo. On his upcoming birthday, as a cruel but well-executed prank, Leung and Fei will feign a lottery win worth $30 million using a useless ticket and a recorded tape bearing the lottery pick from a previous night, all as Kung's birthday present. Excessive greed causes Kung to fall for it, and he immediately (after trying to fool his family so he himself can have all the money) goes out with a selected girlfriend, Gigi, and hits it off at a night club. Instead he runs afoul of Triad member Brother Smartie, who wants a game of dice. Kung easily loses $1 million, as well as $5000 to Gigi, and he relies on his "winnings" in order to pay it all back. When he finally discovers he never won the lottery (much to his shock and dismay), he decides to fake being intellectually disabled, a feat which he pulls off quite well. Then he learns he gains more benefits that way, so he chooses to remain mentally ill for the time being. However, he has to learn the true meaning of life and to take what life has to offer but not ask for more.

== Cast ==
- Stephen Chow - Lo Kung
- Raymond Wong - Lo Leung
- Francis Ng - Lo Fei
- Roy Chiao - Mr. Lo
- Christine Ng - Yinsu
- Jacklyn Wu - Shenny
- Christy Chung - Little Shien
- Gigi Lai - Gigi
- Amanda Lee - Monalisa or Karen Kam/Herself
- Simon Lui - Brother Smartie
- Emil Chau - Long
- Law Ho Kai - Mr. Ting
- Law Koon-Lan - Mrs. Ting
- Alfred Cheung - Mental patient
- Turbo Kong - Left hand man
- Paw Hee-ching - Shenny's mum
- Josie Ho - Girlfriend
- Diana Pang - Girlfriend
- Leslie Cheung - Himself (cameo)
- Pauline Yeung - Herself (cameo)
- Teddy Robin - Himself (cameo)
- Law Kar-ying - Himself (cameo)
- Michael Chow - Himself (cameo)
- Wong Yuk-Long (cameo)

== See also ==
- All's Well, Ends Well (1992)
- All's Well, Ends Well Too (1993)
- All's Well, Ends Well 2009 (2009)
