= Love Swindlers =

1976 Hong Kong film by Li Han-hsiang

- Film poster
- 騙財騙色
- Directed by: Li Han-hsiang
- Written by: Li Han Hsiang
- Produced by: Run Run Shaw
- Starring: Shirley Yu Sha Li; Chen Ping; Dana; Wang Ping; Yueh Hua
- Cinematography: Lam Chiu
- Edited by: Chiang Hsing Lung
- Music by: Chen Yung-Yu
- Production company: Shaw Brothers Studio
- Release date: 11 September 1976 (Hong Kong)
- Running time: 95 minutes
- Country: Hong Kong
- Language: Cantonese

Love Swindlers is a 1976 Hong Kong anthology film directed by Li Han-hsiang. The film is rated in Category III.

== Cast ==
- Shirley Yu Sha Li
- Chen Ping
- Dana
- Wang Ping
- Yueh Hua
- Ku Feng
- Siu Yam Yam
- Hong Hoi
- Lau Luk Wa
- Tin Ching
- Chan Shen
- Cheng Siu Ping
- Cheung Chok Chow
- Cheung Hei
- Chiang Nan
- Fong Yuen
- Fung Ming
- Gam Tin Chue
- Hung Ling Ling
- Kok Lee Yan
- Kong Yeung
- Kwan Yan
- Liu Wai
- Lui Hung
- Ng Ming Tsui
- Ou-Yang Sha Fei
- Sai Gwa Paau
- Shum Lo
- Teresa Ha Ping
- Tsui Oi Sam
- Wang Han Chen
