= All's Well, Ends Well 2009 =

2009 Hong Kong film by Vincent Kok

- Promotional poster
- Directed by: Vincent Kok
- Screenplay by: Vincent Kok; Steven Fung; Poon Chun-Lam
- Story by: Raymond Wong
- Produced by: Raymond Wong; Zhang Zhao
- Starring: Sandra Ng; Louis Koo; Raymond Wong; Ronald Cheng
- Cinematography: Cheung Man-Po
- Edited by: Kong Chi-Leung
- Music by: Raymond Wong Ying-Wah
- Production companies: Mandarin Films Distribution Co. Ltd. Enlight Pictures
- Distributed by: Hong Kong: Mandarin Films Distribution Co. Ltd.
- Release date: 22 January 2009
- Country: Hong Kong
- Language: Cantonese
- Budget: HK$4 million
- Box office: $9,934,679 (worldwide)

All's Well, Ends Well 2009 or abbreviated as AWEW 2009 (Chinese: 家有囍事2009; Cantonese Yale: Ga Yau Hei Si 2009) is a 2009 Hong Kong romantic comedy film directed by Vincent Kok. It is the fourth instalment in the All's Well, Ends Well film series, the previous film being All's Well, Ends Well 1997.

The film stars Louis Koo as a "love therapist" who is hired to woo a hot-tempered young woman (Sandra Ng) by her brother (Ronald Cheng) in the hopes of following a family marriage tradition. Raymond Wong, the producer and co-star of all four films, appears as a private investigator. All's Well, Ends Well 2009 was released in Hong Kong, China, Singapore, and Malaysia on 22 January 2009 and in New Zealand for one week beginning 29 October 2009. As with the last three films, All's Well, Ends Well 2009 was released as a Chinese New Year film, where a film's release is timed to coincide with the larger movie audience at that time of year.

== Plot ==
Kei's (Ronald Cheng) eldest sister Yu Chu (Sandra Ng) is a hot-tempered magazine editor and her temperament has left her single all this while. They have a traditional family and one of the rules is that none of the siblings could get married before their eldest sister. In view of this, Kei sought help from the famous "Casanova," Koo Chai (Louis Koo), who is the new journalist in Sandra's firm to pretend to court his eldest sister and lure her into the mood of love.

With Sandra falling in love with Koo Chai, she decides to introduce him to her parents (Lee Heung Kam, Ha Chun Chou). However, Koo Chai fell in love with another girl, Mun, during an assignment and this broke Sandra's heart. To avoid the disappointment of her parents, Sandra asks Mr. Wong (Raymond Wong) a private investigator to pretend as her boyfriend.

== Cast ==
- Sandra Ng as Yu Chu
- Louis Koo as Dr. Dick Cho/Koo Chai
- Raymond Wong Pak-Ming as L/Mr.Wong
- Ronald Cheng as Yu Bo/Kei
- Yao Chen as Xiao Yazhen
- Lee Heung-Kam as Selina, Yu Chu's mother
- Ha Chun-Chau as Yu Chu's father
- Charlene Choi
- Donnie Yen as a wedding guest
- Clifton Ko as Governor
- Danny Chan Kwok Kwan as Web single #2
- Theresa Fu as a birthday party guest
- Cheung Tat-Ming
- Guo Tao
- Vincent Kok
- Ken Lo
- Miki Shum as Mandy
- Alan Mak as a wedding guest
- Yumiko Cheng
- Steven Cheung
- Lam Chi-chung
- Gill Mohindepaul Singh as L's chauffeur
- Vivek Mahbubani
- Sheila Chan
- Fung Bo Bo as a wedding guest
- Celina Jade
- Winkie Lai

== Production ==
All's Well, Ends Well 2009 is the fourth installment in the All's Well, Ends Well film series. Released twelve years after the last installment, All's Well, Ends Well 1997, the film was directed and co-written by Vincent Kok, who served as a screenwriter for the last three films. The film was produced by Raymond Wong Pak-Ming, the producer of the series, who also appears in a supporting role. Sandra Ng, returns in the new installment after appearing in All's Well, Ends Well. Wong's production company, Mandarin Films, served as a producer and distributor in Hong Kong. The film was shot with a HK$4million (RM1.86mil) budget. On 12 May 2008, a press conference was held in a Tsuen Wan shopping mall, where Wong had announced that a HK$4 million investment would be put into making the 2009 version of All's Well, Ends Well. When asked if Stephen Chow or Maggie Cheung would appear in the new film, Wong described that the casting of the two actors would be difficult and was grateful that Sandra Ng would be joining the cast. While developing the film, Wong had immediately thought of working with Sandra Ng, since they had not appeared together after the first film, All's Well, Ends Well. At the time, Ng had taken a two-year hiatus to raise her daughter. Vincent Kok had cast Louis Koo and Ronald Cheng as the male leads as he felt that the actors were the new generation of comedians in Hong Kong. Filming took place in China at Qiandaohu, Hangzhou, which is located along the Qiantangjiang River.

== Sequel ==
Producers Raymond Wong and Wang Chang Tian announced that a sequel to the film, titled All's Well, Ends Well 2010 will release in 2010.
