= WSM Music Group Ltd. =

- Founded: 1992
- Founder: Colin Cheung
- Genre: Various
- Country of origin: Hong Kong
- Location: 2/F, Yue Xiu Bldg, 87 Hung To Rd, Kwun Tong, Kowloon, Hong Kong
- Official website: http://www.wsmmusic.com

WSM Music Group Ltd.(WSM) is an entertainment company in Hong Kong founded in 1992. The scope of business includes record production and distribution, music publishing & song licensing, audio & video recording licensing, concert organiser, artiste management, professional rehearsal room rental and CD direct sales marketing.

== History ==
The company includes WSM Entertainment Ltd. in artiste management and concert production, and WorldStar Music Int'l Ltd.in production & distribution. Record music label musicNEXT, a young brand promoting artistes, is the wholly owned subsidiary of WSM Entertainment Ltd.

=== WSM Entertainment Ltd. ===
Founded in 2002, WSM Entertainment Ltd. specializes in repackaging classic singers. WSM Entertainment Ltd. artistes include Rosanne Lui, Wan Kwong, Nancy Sit, etc. Business includes artiste management and concert production, also to arrange performance for their artistes and singers, as well as advertising spokespersons.

=== WorldStar Music Int'l Ltd. ===
Founded in 1992, WorldStar Music Int'l Ltd. The scope of business includes recording, production, distribution, direct marketing, business of music copyright, music publishing and agency, and the introduction and promotion of European, American and Southeast Asian original songs.

== List of WSM Entertainment Ltd. artists ==
- Nancy Sit
- Rosanne Lui
- Lee Heung-kam
- Donald Cheung
- Alice Lau
- Lau Ying Hung
- Suzan G
- Dianna Tse
- Yang Yan
- Wan Kwong
- Jonny Ip
- Peter Chan
- Joe Mok
- Ching Shan
- Xie Lei
- Lin Chong
- Edith Au
- Amy Wong

== List of musicNEXT artists ==
- Angela Au
- Kellyjackie
- TikChi
- Lily Chen
- Gloria
- Fred Cheung
- Stephanie Ho
- Abo
- Eunice Chan
