= Seven Warriors =

1989 Hong Kong film by Terry Tong

- US film poster
- Traditional Chinese: 忠義群英
- Simplified Chinese: 忠义群英
- Hanyu Pinyin: Zhōngyì Qúnyīng
- Jyutping: Zung1 Ji6 Kwan4 Jing1
- Directed by: Terry Tong
- Written by: Tsang Kan-cheung
- Produced by: John Shum
- Starring: Adam Cheng; Jacky Cheung; Max Mok; Tony Leung; Wu Ma; Shing Fui-On; Ben Lam; Lo Lieh; Elaine Jin; Gregory Lee; Yip San; Sammo Hung
- Cinematography: Gray Ho; Yeung Hok-leung; Terry Tong
- Edited by: Cheung Kwok-kuen; Cheung Pei-tak
- Music by: Lo Ta-yu; Richard Lo; Tang Siu-lam
- Production company: Maverick Film
- Distributed by: Newport Entertainment
- Release date: 26 August 1989
- Running time: 94 minutes
- Country: Hong Kong
- Language: Cantonese
- Box office: HK$6,646,992

Seven Warriors (Chinese: 忠義群英) is a 1989 Hong Kong action film directed by Terry Tong and starring Adam Cheng, Jacky Cheung, Max Mok and Tony Leung Chiu-Wai with a guest appearance by Sammo Hung. This film is a homage to the 1954 Japanese film Seven Samurai.

== Plot ==
The story is set during the Warlord Era in China, a time when many soldiers turned to banditry, causing havoc among farmers. In Guangxi, a small village is constantly terrorized by bandits who steal and threaten the villagers. To protect their community, the villagers hire seven warriors. These warriors lead the villagers in preparing for battle, and together, they successfully defeat the bandits.

== Cast ==
- Adam Cheng as General Chik
- Jacky Cheung as Ching Ka
- Max Mok as Yung
- Tony Leung Chiu-Wai as Wong Wai-mo
- Wu Ma as Old Man
- Shing Fui-On as Kau
- Ben Lam as Mau Tin-lui
- Lo Lieh as Ma Cheng-piu
- Elaine Jin
- Gregory Lee as Fung Sau
- Yip San
- Sammo Hung as Hung Sap-kan (cameo)
- Fung Hak-on as Wu Long (cameo)
- Lisa Chiao Chiao as Aunt Ping cameo)
- Shum Wai as Master Kam (cameo)
- Philip Kwok as Ngau
- Thomas Wong
- Yeung Sing as bandit
- Bak Man-biu as Village head
- Chan King as Hang
- David Ho as muscle man
- Yiu Yau-hung as Master Kam's bandit
- Wong Kwok-fai as villager
- Leung Sam as villager
- Ho Chi-moon as villager
- Kong Long as bandit
- Wong Ka-leung as bandit and fighter
- Chui Kin-wah as old fighter
- Dion Lam as bandit
- Lam Chi-tai as villager
- Tam Wai-man as bandit
- Lau Shung-fung as bandit
- Chung Wing as thug
- Ma Yuk-sing as thug
- Derek Kok as bandit
- Lam Fu-wah as bandit
- Choi Hin-cheung as bandit
- Lee Yiu-king as guard
- Wan Seung-lam
- Kong Chuen

== Box office ==
This film grossed HK$6,646,992 at the Hong Kong box office during its theatrical run from 26 August to 13 September 1989 in Hong Kong.

== See also ==
- Jacky Cheung filmography
- Sammo Hung filmography
- Seven Samurai
