= Jacky Cheung filmography =

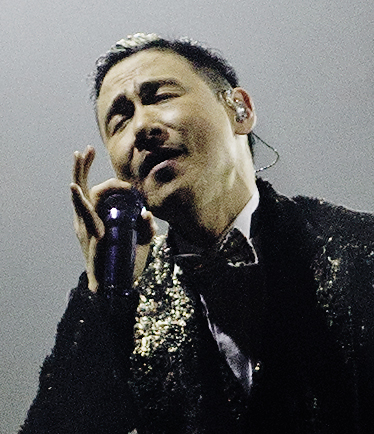
Cheung in 2018

This article details the filmography of singer and actor Jacky Cheung.

Several of Cheung's films premiered, including Where's Officer Tuba?, Bullet in the Head and High Risk.

== Filmography ==
Year	Title	Role	Notes
1986	Where's Officer Tuba?	Officer Cheung	
1986	Devoted to You	Jacky	
1986	Soul	Jacky Cheung	
1987	The Haunted Cop Shop of Horrors	Macky Kim	
1988	The Eighth Happiness	Fang Chien Sheng	
1988	The Haunted Cop Shop of Horrors 2	Kam Mak-kei	
1988	Couples, Couples, Couples	John Chen	
1988	As Tears Go By	Fly	Hong Kong Film Award for Best Supporting Actor
1988	Mother vs. Mother	Kuan Jen-chien	
1988	Tiger Cage	Fong Chun Yau	
1988	Faithfully Yours	Chan Hoi-sum	
1989	My Dear Son	Ho Tin-cheung	
1989	Vampire Buster	Jacky	
1989	Miracles	Recruiter at the Factory	Cameo
1989	The Nobles	Dee	
1989	Seven Warriors	One of the 7 Warriors	
1989	Little Cop	Restaurant customer	Cameo
1990	Best Friend of the Cops	Tsai Tzu Chiang	
1990	The Swordsman	Au Yang Kwan	Golden Horse Award for Best Supporting Actor; Nominated – Hong Kong Film Award for Best Supporting Actor
1990	Curry and Pepper	Curry	
1990	A Chinese Ghost Story II	Autumn	Nominated – Hong Kong Film Award for Best Supporting Actor
1990	Bullet in the Head	Fai Jai	Nominated – Hong Kong Film Award for Best Actor
1990	Demoness from Thousand Years	Mambo	
1990	Point of No Return	Dee	
1990	Days of Being Wild	York's pal	
1991	Off Track	Lui	
1991	The Perfect Match	Jacky Kim	
1991	The Raid	Bobo Bear	
1991	Will of Iron	Jacky	
1991	A Chinese Legend	Kar Yat Lung	
1991	A Chinese Ghost Story III	Swordsman Yin	
1991	Once Upon a Time in China	So Sai-man ("Bucktooth" So)	Nominated – Hong Kong Film Award for Best Supporting Actor
1991	Bullet for Hire	Shan	
1991	Slickers vs. Killers	Bat	
1991	The Banquet	Hok Yau	
1992	True Love	Vincent Lam	
1992	The Days of Being Dumb	A Kei	
1992	With or Without You	Prince	
1992	Best of the Best	Li Man-kit	
1992	Deadly Dream Woman	Ji	
1992	Hot Hot and Pom Pom	Chien	
1992	The Wicked City	Ken Kai	
1993	Future Cops	Broom Man	
1993	Enigma of Love	Jackie	
1993	The Eagle Shooting Heroes	Hung Chat	
1993	Flying Dagger	Nine-tailed Fox	
1993	No More Love, No More Death	Prince	
1993	Boys Are Easy	Wu Ying	
1994	Love on Delivery	Himself	Cameo
1994	To Live and Die in Tsimshatsui	Crazy Lik	Nominated – Hong Kong Film Award for Best Actor
1994	The Private Eye Blues	Private Eye	
1994	Ashes of Time	Hung Chat	
1995	High Risk	Wing Wai	Nominated – Golden Horse Award for Best Leading Actor
1996	Out of the Blur	Ang Si Laam Shing Haak	Short film
1998	Anna Magdalena	Policeman	Cameo
1999	Dragon Heat		Cameo
2000	Dinosaur	Aladar (voice)	Cantonese dub
2002	July Rhapsody	Lai Yiu-kwok	Nominated – Hong Kong Film Award for Best Actor
2003	Dragon Loaded 2003	Police band member	Cameo
2003	Golden Chicken 2	Quincy	Nominated – Hong Kong Film Award for Best Actor; Nominated – Golden Horse Awards for Best Actor
2003	1:99 Shorts	11	Short film
2004	Jiang Hu	Mr. Lefty	
2004	Super Model	Himself	Cameo
2005	Perhaps Love	Nie Wen	Hong Kong Film Award for Best Original Film Song
2006	The Heavenly Kings		Cameo
2008	Bolt	Bolt (voice)	Cantonese dub
2009	Bodyguards and Assassins	Yang Quyun	Cameo
2010	Crossing Hennessy	Loy	Nominated – Hong Kong Film Award for Best Actor
2010	Hot Summer Days	Wah	
2010	72 Tenants of Prosperity	Shek Kin	
2013	A Complicated Story	Yuk Cheung	
2014	Temporary Family	George	Cameo
2015	Helios	Professor Siu Chi-yan	
2016	From Vegas to Macau III	Yik Tin-hang	
2016	Heaven in the Dark	Marco To	Nominated – Hong Kong Film Award for Best Actor; Nominated – Golden Horse Award for Best Leading Actor
2016	Finding Dory	Marine Conservation Ambassador (voice)	Cantonese dub; cameo
2024	Customs Frontline	Cheung Wan-nam	
