= Bullet for Hire =

1991 Hong Kong film by Yuen Chun-man

- DVD cover
- Traditional Chinese: 子彈出租
- Simplified Chinese: 子弹出租
- Hanyu Pinyin: Zǐ Dàn Chū Zū
- Jyutping: Zi2 Daan2 Ceot1 Zou1
- Directed by: Yuen Chun-man
- Screenplay by: Yuen Chun-man; Leung Wai-ting
- Produced by: Chan Kin-ting
- Starring: Jacky Cheung; Simon Yam; Dick Wei; Lo Lieh; Sheila Chan
- Cinematography: Johnny Koo
- Edited by: Marco Mak
- Music by: Mak Hiu-lun
- Production company: Vediocam Film
- Distributed by: Golden Princess Amusement
- Release date: 5 September 1991
- Running time: 93 minutes
- Country: Hong Kong
- Language: Cantonese
- Box office: HK$3,646,104

Bullet for Hire is a 1991 Hong Kong action film written and directed by Yuen Chun-man and starring Jacky Cheung, Simon Yam, Dick Wei, Lo Lieh and Sheila Chan.

== Plot ==
Triad assassins Ngok (Lo Lieh), Hon (Simon Yam) and Shan (Jacky Cheung) are struggling in a battle for money and power in Hong Kong. Ngok and Hon has worked for triad boss Dick (Dick Wei) for over ten years and the two have established a profound friendship. Because they were clever, the two were heavily utilized by Dick. However, Ngok is getting old and worried that Dick will harm his only daughter, San (Elaine Chow). With the help of the police, Ngok was able to fake his death during an assassination attempt.

Shan, on the other hand, is a newcomer killer. While following Hon, Shan gets to learn about the fickleness of the world. One time after winning HK$100,000 from a bet, he encounters a message girl, Lan (Sheila Chan) and develops a romantic relationship with her. At this time, Dick suspects that Ngok's death was faked and sends Hon and Shan to kill him. Dick also kidnaps Lan to blackmail Shan and at this critical moment of deciding the fate of three of them, the choices of life and death are in front of them.

== Cast ==
- Jacky Cheung as Shan
- Simon Yam as Hon
- Dick Wei as Mr. Dick
- Lo Lieh as Ngok
- Sheila Chan as Lan
- Elaine Lui as Interpol officer
- Elaine Chow as San
- Lam Chung as Bill (cameo)
- Ma Kei as Kwai (cameo)
- Hung San-sam as Ngok's victim in flashback
- Wan Seung-lam as Mr. Dick's thug
- Lee Chun-kit as Mr. Dick's thug
- Paul Wong as Mr. Dick's thug
- Wong Chi-keung as Mr. Dick's thug
- Lung Tin-sang as Boss playing darts in pub
- Johnny Cheung as Boss's thug/Mr. Dick's thug
- Ridley Tsui as Boss's thug
- Johnny Yip
- Tam Chuen-leung
- Danny Chow as one of Kwai's men
- Tam Chuen-hing as Superintendent Henry Tso Hon
- Jameson Lam as Restaurant captain
- Ken Yip as Ngai Chai-wan's bodyguard
- Tsim Siu-ling
- Hung Yan-yan
- Roger Thomas as Mr. Wilson
- Johnny Koo as Kau
- Huang Kai Sen as Assassin
- Benny Lai as Boss's thug
- Ka See-fung as Boss's thug
- Hon Chun as Boss's thug
- Kwok Nga-cheung

== Theme song ==
- Resurrection (復活)
  - Composer: Donald Ashley
  - Lyricist: Calvin Poon
  - Singer: Jacky Cheung

== Reception ==
=== Critical ===
City On Fire gave the film a score of 8/10 and writes "It's an erratic, irreverent, almost anything goes flick with comedy that's actually comical and some explosive action sequences that get the squibs bursting."

=== Box office ===
The film grossed HK$3,646,104 at the Hong Kong box office during its theatrical run from 5 to 11 September 1991 in Hong Kong.

== See also ==
- Jacky Cheung filmography
- Lo Lieh filmography
