= Faithfully Yours =

1988 Hong Kong film by Wong Wa-kei

- Film poster
- Traditional Chinese: 最佳女婿
- Simplified Chinese: 最佳女婿
- Hanyu Pinyin: Zuì Jiā Nǚ Xù
- Jyutping: Zeoi3 Gaai1 Neoi2 Sai3
- Directed by: Wong Wa-kei
- Screenplay by: Cheung Hoi-hing
- Produced by: Wong Wa-kei
- Starring: Jacky Cheung; Max Mok; Stephen Chow; Sharla Cheung
- Cinematography: Lau Hung-chuen
- Edited by: Poon Hung
- Music by: David Wu
- Production companies: Long Shong Pictures; Golden Princess Film Production; Kay's Productions
- Distributed by: Golden Princess Films
- Release date: 8 December 1988
- Running time: 90 minutes
- Country: Hong Kong
- Language: Cantonese
- Box office: HK$5,807,710

Faithfully Yours is a 1988 Hong Kong romantic comedy film, directed by Wong Wa-kei and starring Jacky Cheung, Max Mok, Stephen Chow and Sharla Cheung.

== Plot ==
Happy, Big Eye and Puddin Lai are good friends, Happy is a hairstylist who opens his "Great Grass Hair Salon" next to the "Great Shanghai Hair Salon", which dissatisfies Greater Shanghai's owner, Chuk Tai-chung. While the two are at loggerheads on the occasion, Chuk's daughter, Ying, goes to Great Grass Hair Salon and the three friends do their best to pursue her. One time during a drunk accident, Ying becomes pregnant but does not know who the father is and can only wait the birth of her child to confirm the identity. Happy, Big Eye and Puddin begin to fawn Ying and her family in every possible way, resulting in a series of big jokes.

== Cast ==
- Jacky Cheung as Happy Chan Hoi-sam
- Max Mok as Big Eye / Kei Ho-yan
- Stephen Chow as Puddin Lai
- Sharla Cheung as Ying
- Richard Ng as Chuk Tai-chung / Shanghai Man, Ying's father
- Lydia Shum as Shanghai Lady, Ying's mother
- Teddy Yip as Ying's godfather
- Sing Yan as barbershop assistant
- Mak Ho Wai as rich taxi driver
- Bowie Wu as Birdy
- Law Ching-ho as Elephant
- Liu Kai-chi as medical laboratory worker
- Cheung Yuen-wah as girl in maternity ward
- Alan Chan as doctor
- Joyce Cheng as infant
- Yuen Ling-to

== Box office ==
The film grossed HK$5,807,710 at the Hong Kong box office during its theatrical run from 8 December 1988 to 5 January 1989 in Hong Kong.

== See also ==
- Jacky Cheung filmography
