= Seed of Evil =

1981 Hong Kong film by Kao Pao-shu

- Nie zhong
- Directed by: Kao Pao-shu
- Screenplay by: Kao Pao-shu
- Starring: Yasuaki Kurata; Tamaki Funakura; Shirley Yu
- Release date: 7 March 1981

Seed of Evil (original name Nie Zhong) is a 1981 Hong Kong comedic thriller written and directed by actress turned director Kao Pao-shu. It's notable for being her last directorial effort. Actors Yasuaki Kurata, Tamaki Funakura, and Shirley Yu star. The film—which centers on two young sisters who are constantly fighting—has a slapstick sensibility to its comedy. It never got a U.S. release.
