= All's Well, Ends Well =

1992 Hong Kong film by Clifton Ko

- DVD cover

Chinese name
- Traditional Chinese: 家有囍事
- Simplified Chinese: 家有囍事
- Literal meaning: Family has double happiness incident
Transcriptions
Standard Mandarin
- Hanyu Pinyin: Jiā Yǒu Xǐ Shì
Yue: Cantonese
- Jyutping: Gaa1 Jau2 Hei2 Si6
- Directed by: Clifton Ko
- Screenplay by: Vincent Kok; Tessa Choi; Roman Cheung
- Story by: Lee Lik-chi; Woo Nga-si; Raymond Wong; Man Chang-yat; Philip Cheng; Shirley Woo; Eric Yeung
- Produced by: Clifton Ko; Raymond Wong
- Starring: Leslie Cheung; Stephen Chow; Raymond Wong; Maggie Cheung; Sandra Ng; Teresa Mo
- Cinematography: Lee Kin-keung
- Edited by: Kam Ma
- Music by: Violet Lam
- Production company: Regal Films
- Distributed by: Mandarin Films Ltd. Regal Films Distribution Co. Ltd.
- Release date: 25 January 1992
- Running time: 100 minutes
- Country: Hong Kong
- Language: Cantonese
- Box office: HK$48,992,188

All's Well, Ends Well or abbreviated as AWEW (Chinese: 家有囍事) is a 1992 Hong Kong comedy film directed by Clifton Ko. The film stars Leslie Cheung, Stephen Chow, Raymond Wong, Maggie Cheung, Sandra Ng, and Teresa Mo.

All's Well, Ends Well was a Lunar New Year film, where a film's release was timed to coincide with the larger movie audience at that time of year. The movie is also one of Stephen Chow's trademark 'mo lei tau' films of little sense but much good-natured humour, and is still considered to be a cult classic by most Hong Kong audiences.

The film was followed by seven sequels:

- All's Well, Ends Well Too (1993)
- All's Well, Ends Well 1997 (1997)
- All's Well, Ends Well 2009 (2009)
- All's Well, Ends Well 2010 (2010)
- All's Well, Ends Well 2011 (2011)
- All's Well, Ends Well 2012 (2012)
- All's Well, Ends Well 2020 (2020)

== Plot ==
All's Well, Ends Well is a comic romance of three hapless brothers who eventually learn, through their amorous exploits and misadventures, that love is only won through gradual nurturing, and quickly lost through the quick, dishonest, selfish ways which they have always taken for granted.

Moon (Raymond Wong) is the eldest brother and head of the family. The film begins on his 7th wedding anniversary with his devoted, but unattractive wife, Leng (Sandra Ng), a celebration which he deserts, instead preferring the company of his more attractive mistress, Sheila (Sheila Chan). He turns up at home with her later, forcing his wife (whom he calls 'hag') to leave the house in dismay. Leng finds work as a party entertainer in a karaoke bar where she improves her looks and her singing ability. The family household devolves into chaos following Leng's departure and when Moon encounters her one night at the bar, he falls in love once again, which causes his relationship with Sheila to deteriorate. Moon attempts to reconcile with Leng on several occasions but is rebuffed repeatedly.

So (Leslie Cheung) is the effeminate middle brother, a floral arranger and lecturer at an art school, who is good at cooking and enjoys women's hobbies. His second cousin Mo-seung (Teresa Mo), who possesses masculine traits, comes to the family home on the evening of the anniversary and entirely devours an elaborate gourmet banquet which So had intended as a gift for Leng on her otherwise disastrous celebration day. She works at the same school as So as an acupuncture massage teacher, whose methods leave many of her clients in physical pain. So and Mo-seung are constantly at odds over trivial issues, which intensifies after So forces Mo-seung out of her position at the school. Their pettiness is highlighted when they irreconcilably insult each other with vulgar metaphors during a mahjong game session. Sheila causes a power outage at the family residence, which So and Mo-seung attempt to fix together, but electrical shocks they receive in the kitchen cause them to temporarily fall in love with one another.

Foon (Stephen Chow) is the youngest brother and a local radio DJ who flirts shamelessly while on air and is well known among his legion of female fans for his impressive kissing technique. A listener named Holli-yuk (Maggie Cheung) calls him on air one day and arranges a date with him. She is an avid Hollywood movie lover who enjoys re-enacting particular love-scenes from movies. She is convinced that Foon shares her romantic outlook and they soon become lovers. Foon, however, is a notorious playboy not eager to settle down. Predictably, Holli-yuk catches him in an act of infidelity. After a freak accident leaves Foon suffering from a mildly debilitating mental illness, Holli-yuk offers to become a nurse for him. Taking advantage of her role as his nurturer, she gleefully devises methods to punish him for his callous behaviour. Her efforts fail when her feelings for him repeatedly overpower her attempts at vengeance. They reconcile when she discovers a Styrofoam statue Foon makes in her name.

During a birthday party at the family home, Sheila leaves Moon due to her dissatisfaction with his yearning for Leng, coupled with her own apparent yearning for her previously selfish, concubine lifestyle. So and Mo-seung each invite their own love interests to the home for the party. However, So and Mo-seung are both dismayed and heartbroken to find that their love interests are looking to marry each other as opposed to them, which prompts them to break down crying together in So's bedroom. Remembering the incident from the kitchen, they both shock themselves and form their own romantic relationship. Holli-yuk shows up at the party and is dismayed to see Foon partying heavily with other women, but he sustains another head injury and is brought to clarity upon seeing her. Holli-yuk storms out of the party, but she once again reconciles with Foon when he rides up to her in a motorcycle dawning a look resembling the Terminator. Leng reconciles with Moon when he sings a song for her at the karaoke bar with the rest of the family in attendance.

With their love lives now secured; the film ends with the family participating in a wedding ceremony with their respective lovers.

== Cast and roles ==
- Stephen Chow as Seung Foon, a womanizer DJ who enjoys flirting while on broadcast
- Maggie Cheung as Holli-yuk, an art film-lover who dreams of finding her dream guy
- Leslie Cheung as Seung So, Foon's effeminate elder brother who is a floral arranger
- Teresa Mo as Leung Mo-seung, So's second cousin and nemesis turned lover
- Raymond Wong as Seung Moon, Foon's eldest brother who is unfaithful
- Sandra Ng as Leng, Wife of Moon who was divorced and then remarried
- Sheila Chan as Sheila, Moon's mistress who was once a beauty pageant winner
- Lee Heung-kam as Mama Seung, the brothers' mother
- Kwan Hoi-san as Papa Seung, the brothers' father
- Clifton Ko as an annoyed karaoke patron
- Vincent Kok as a Japanese businessman
- Loletta Lee as one of Foon's girlfriends
- James Wong
- Wong Kwong-leung as Brother Kwong
- Andrew Yuen as Kai-ming
- Cheri Ho as Dolleen
- Chow Chi-fai as a doctor

== Reception ==
The film was the second highest-grossing film of the year and all-time with a gross of HK$49.0 million, just behind Justice, My Foot! with HK$49.9 million.
