= Butterfly and Sword =

1993 Hong Kong film by Michael Mak

- Film poster
- 新流星蝴蝶劍
- Directed by: Michael Mak
- Screenplay by: John Chong
- Based on: Liuxing Hudie Jian by Gu Long
- Produced by: Chu Yen-ping
- Starring: Tony Leung; Michelle Yeoh; Jimmy Lin; Joey Wong; Donnie Yen
- Cinematography: Chan Wing-shu
- Edited by: Ma Chung-yiu; Wong Jing-cheung; Mui Tung-lit
- Music by: Stephen Shing; Chris Babida
- Production companies: Chang-Hong Channel Film & Video
- Distributed by: Regal Films Distribution; Tai Seng Video Marketing
- Release date: 16 January 1993
- Running time: 88 minutes
- Country: Hong Kong
- Language: Cantonese
- Box office: HK$9,167,960

Butterfly and Sword (新流星蝴蝶劍), also known as Butterfly Sword on home media releases, is a 1993 Hong Kong wuxia film adapted from the novel Liuxing Hudie Jian by Gu Long. Directed by Michael Mak, with action directed by Ching Siu-tung, the film starred Tony Leung, Michelle Yeoh, Jimmy Lin, Joey Wong and Donnie Yen.

== Synopsis ==
During the Ming dynasty, the government is controlled by two powerful opposing factions led by eunuchs. Eunuch Cao, who is paralysed, learns that his rival, Eunuch Li, is plotting a rebellion with Sun Yubo, the master of a martial arts clan called Juxian Shanzhuang.

Gao Laoda, the master of an assassin group called Kuaihuolin, sends two of her best fighters, Meng Xinghun and Ye Xiang, to retrieve a secret letter containing evidence of Eunuch Li's treachery, and deliver it to Eunuch Cao. They soon discover that Eunuch Cao is actually a formidable martial artist pretending to be incapacitated.

Meng Xinghun is a happy-go-lucky and romantic man who enjoys stargazing. He truly loves his wife Xiaodie, who does not know he is an assassin in disguise as a merchant, but Gao Laoda has affections for him. Ye Xiang, in contrast, is aloof and arrogant, and he has a crush on Gao Laoda but is afraid to confess to her.

After Eunuch Li is killed, it is revealed that Eunuch Cao is really the one plotting a rebellion. With the aid of a prince, Gao Laoda, Meng Xinghun and Ye Xiang defeat Eunuch Cao. At this point in time, Gao Laoda has become the foremost figure in the jianghu, but she fears losing Meng Xinghun, who simply wants to be with Xiaodie. Ye Xiang, on the other hand, has finally mustered the courage to tell Gao Laoda that he loves her.

== Cast ==
- Tony Leung as Meng Xinghun
- Michelle Yeoh as Gao Jiping (Gao Laoda)
- Jimmy Lin as Prince Jia
- Joey Wong as Xiaodie
- Donnie Yen as Ye Xiang
- Tok Chung-wa as Lü Xiangchuan
- Elvis Tsui as Sun Yubo
- Yip Chuen-chan as He Jing / Miao Xiaoxiao
- Lee Ka-ting as Lei Zhongyuan
- Chang Kuo-chu as Eunuch Li
- Wong Chung-kui as Eunuch Cao
- Lee Wai as Sun Jian
