= Kick Boxer =

1993 Hong Kong film by Wu Ma

- Film poster
- Traditional Chinese: 黃飛鴻之鬼腳七
- Simplified Chinese: 黄飞鸿之鬼脚七
- Hanyu Pinyin: Huáng Fēi Hóng Zhī Guǐ Jiǎo Qī
- Jyutping: Wong4 Fei1 Hung4 Zi1 Gwai2 Geok3 Caat1
- Directed by: Wu Ma
- Screenplay by: Lee Man-choi
- Produced by: Yuen Biao
- Starring: Yuen Biao; Shirley Lui; Yuen Wah; Wu Ma; Yen Shi-kwan; Sheila Chin
- Cinematography: Bill Wong; Ng Man-ting; Chan Siu-kwan
- Edited by: Chun Yu
- Music by: John Wong; Tang Siu-lam
- Production companies: Golden Tripod Film; Regal Films; Yuen Biao Film Company
- Distributed by: Regal Films Distribution
- Release date: 6 February 1993
- Running time: 92 minutes
- Country: Hong Kong
- Language: Cantonese
- Box office: HK$7,606,886

Kick Boxer (also known in the West as Once Upon a Chinese Hero and Once Upon a Time in China 6: Kickboxer) is a 1993 Hong Kong martial arts film directed by Wu Ma, who also appears in a supporting role. The film stars and is produced by Yuen Biao, who also serves as the film's action director in the title role.

== Plot ==
Lau Chat (Yuen Biao), a young talented martial artist, joins Po Chi Lam to study under master Wong Fei-hung, who is away traveling in Asia. Chat and his friend So (Wu Ma), one of Wong's disciples, were traveling to Hong Kong to buy medicine, and meets a journalist, Siu-ling (Shirley Lui), who was being harassed by foreigners on a ship. Chat helps Siu-ling fend off the foreigners and they strike s friendship. At this time, Ming (Tai Po), a misfit friend of Chat, was smuggling opium for the Chinese Western Chamber of Commerce and sneaks it past security by hiding in Po Chi Lam's medicine pack, to which Chat and So were oblivious.

When Wah (Yuen Wah), the chairman of the Chinese Western Chamber of Commerce, learns of the whereabouts of the opium, he sends his henchman to Po Chi Lam to retrieve it, but the plan was foiled by the Po Chi Lam disciples. This next day, constable Panther (Yen Shi-kwan), Siu-ling's father, leads his troop to raid Po Chi Lam and find the opium and arrests Chat and So to the yamen. Chat, who is disowned by his fellow Po Chi Lam disciples, sneaks into the Chinese Western Chamber of Commerce to clear his name but was caught and beaten. To add insult to his injury, he was scolded by his dai sihing, and he angrily leaves Po Chi Lam. After going through heavy twist and turns and feeling disheartened, Siu-ling encourages him and he works with Panther and goes undercover into the Chinese Western Chamber of Commerce. One time while the Shahe Gang attempted to attack Chairman Wah, Chat steps in to fend off the Shahe Gang and wins Wah's trust. Chat secretly investigates and gather evidence on Wah's crimes and swears to bring him to justice.

== Cast ==
- Yuen Biao as Lau Chat (劉七), the film's protagonist.
- Shirley Lui as Siu-ling (小菱), Chat's love interest who is a journalist who studied abroad and received western education.
- Yuen Wah as Chairman Wah (華會長), the film's antagonist, chairman of the Chinese Western Chamber of Commerce and an opium smuggler.
- Wu Ma as Buckteeth So (牙擦蘇), Chat's friend and a disciple of Wong Fei-hung.
- Yen Shi-kwan as Gold Panther (山東豹), a constable officer and Siu-ling's father.
- Sheila Chin as Jane (阿珍), a disciple of Wong who had a soft spot for Chat.
- Chen Shan as a fighter in black tuxedo.
- Tai Po as Ming (蛇仔明), Chat's misfit friend who smuggles opium for Wah.
- Louis Roth
- Chin Shih-erh as Wah's henchman.
- Yuen Miu
- Chu Lo-kong
- Chu Tau as Wah's henchman.
- Lau Fong-sai as Wah's henchman.
- Cheung Tung-sing
- Lo Hoi-chiu as the leader of the Shahe Gang.
- Ko Shut-fung
- Siu Lap-yan
- Ko Chi-wong
- Suen Siu-wai
- Chui Hok-ming
- Choi Yat-chow
- Tin Hiu-hung
- Leung Kwan-keung
- Leung Wing-king
- Leung Yee-ching
- Ng Siu-ling
- Chan Shiu-lang
- Martin Klukham
- Tarek Boschko
- Robert Kirk

== Reception ==
=== Critical reception ===
J. Doyle Wallis of DVD Talk gave the film a score of 2.5 out of 5 stars and criticizes it as an apparent imitator of Once Upon a Time in China. Paul Bramhall of City on Fire gave the film a score of 7.5/10 and praises the film's action choreography and creativity and singles out Yen Shi-kwan's performance. Andrew Saroch of Far East Films gave the film of score of 4 out of 5 stars, praising the film's action choreography and describes Yuen Biao's performance as "charming", and notes how the film's apparent budget constraints did not detract from the quality of the film. Hong Kong Film Net gave the film a score of 6 out of 10, noting its generic plot with the action scenes being the film's saving grace.

=== Box office ===
The film grossed a total of HK$7,606,886 at the Hong Kong box office during its theatrical run from 6 to 17 February 1993.

== See also ==
- Yuen Biao filmography
- Yuen Wah filmography
