= Sheila Chin =

Hong Kong actress

- Born: Hong Kong
- Occupation: Actress

Chinese name
- Traditional Chinese: 陳淑蘭
- Simplified Chinese: 陈淑兰
Transcriptions
Standard Mandarin
- Hanyu Pinyin: chén shūlán
Yue: Cantonese
- Jyutping: can4 suk1 laan4
- Musical career
- Also known as: 陳道然 (Chan To Yin)

Sheila Chin (陳淑蘭, Pinyin: Chen Shulan) is a Hong Kong actress.

Chin was the first runner-up at the 1988 Miss Hong Kong Pageant.

== Personal life ==
In 2023, Chin revealed that she was abandoned as a baby and was adopted by her adoptive mother. Her adoptive mother only revealed to Chin months before her death and a DNA test confirmed they have no relations.

== Filmography ==
- All's Well, Ends Well 2009 (2009)
- Love Is Not All Around (2007)
- Forever Yours (2004)
- Magic Kitchen (2004) - Yau's Mom
- Visible Secret 2 (2002)
- Funeral March (2001) - Elsa
- Thanks for Your Love (1996) - Nancy
- The Day That Doesn't Exist (1995) - Poon Ka-Sze
- Because of Lies (1995) - Siu B's Girlfriend
- He & She (1994) - Chi-Kai's Sister-in-Law
- Whatever You Want (1994) - Julianna
- Kick Boxer (1993) - Jane
- Heroes Among Heroes (1993) - Aunt Jean
- The Inspector Wears Skirts 4 (1992) - Lou
- Lady Hunter (1992) - Blackie
- All's Well, Ends Well (1992) - Sheila
- Her Fatal Ways (1991) - Hsuen Pi
- Doctor Vampire (1991) - May Chen
- Bullet for Hire (1991) - Lan
- All for the Winner (1990) - Ying
- The Outlaw Brothers (1990) - Lan
- Prince of the Sun (1990) - Wan May-Ngor
- Stars and Roses (1989)
- Run, Don't Walk (1989)

== TV series ==
- Dr Vampire (1990)
- Conscience (1994)
- FM 701 (2003)

== TV show anchor ==
- The Funny Half Show
