= Shirley Yu =

Hong Kong actress

Shirley Yu Sha-Li (Chinese: 余莎莉, born 1955) is a Chinese born Hong Kong actress.

She won the 1974 Miss Hong Kong pageant, organized by the Miss Pearl of the Orient Company (東方之珠選美會). (Note: Following earlier pageant organizers, TVB started organizing its own Miss Hong Kong pageant in 1973, and there were as a consequence two "Miss Hong Kong" title holders in both 1973 and 1974. The 1974 Miss Hong Kong pageant organized by the Miss Pearl of the Orient Company took place at the Hilton Grand Auditorium in September 1973.)

== Selected filmography ==
- Gambler's Delight (1981)
- Seed of Evil (1981)
- Hex Vs Witchcraft (1980)
- Bastard Swordsman, The Grand Conclusion (1979)
- The Ghost Story (1979)
- Life Gamble (1979)
- Scandalous Warlord (1979)
- The Brave Archer 2 (1978)
- Sensual Pleasures (1978)
- The Call Girls (1977)
- Chinatown Kid (1977)
- Confessions of a Private Secretary (1977)
- Dreams of Eroticism (1977)
- Lady Exterminator (1977)
- Love Swindlers (1976)
- Moods of Love (1976)
