= Shaolin Handlock =

1978 Hong Kong film by Ho Meng Hua

- Film poster
- Directed by: Ho Meng Hua
- Written by: Ni Kuang
- Produced by: Run Run Shaw
- Starring: Lo Lieh; David Chiang; Michael Chan; Dick Wei; Chen Ping
- Cinematography: Cho Wai-Kei
- Edited by: Chiang Hsing-Lung
- Music by: Frankie Chan
- Production company: Shaw Brothers Studio
- Release date: 10 June 1978 (Hong Kong)
- Running time: 89 minutes
- Country: Hong Kong
- Languages: Mandarin; Cantonese

Shaolin Handlock (Chinese: 十字鎖喉手) is a 1978 Shaw Brothers film directed by Ho Meng Hua, starring Lo Lieh and David Chiang.

== Plot ==
Li Bai (Dick Wei) is the creator and master of the 'Shi Zi So Hou Shou' ('Throat Locking Hand', or 'Shaolin Hand Lock') who passes down this skill to his children Cheng Ying (David Chiang) and Meng Ping (Chen Ping). An old friend Fang Yun Biao (Chan Shen) Manages to kill Li Bai by exploiting the skill's only weakness and, unknowingly, kills his two other students which he believed were Li Bai's children. After his real children find out of the murder, Cheng Ying sets out to avenge his father. He travels to Thailand to kill Fang and learns that he was hired by the rich benevolent Lin Hao (Lo Lieh). Cheng Ying tricks Lin Hao into accepting him as a bodyguard by stealing gold that belonged to Lin Hao. While suspected by other guards, Lin Hao remains in a difficult situation to find out if Li Bai's siblings are still alive and what Cheng Ying is really there for.

== Cast ==
- Lo Lieh – Lin Hao
- David Chiang – Li Cheng Ying
- Michael Chan – Li Kun Shi
- Dick Wei - Li Bai
- Chen Ping - Li Meng Ping
- Kara Hui - Li's student
- Chan Shen - Fang Yun Biao
