= Tang Bik-wan =

Chinese actress and Cantonese opera singer from Hong Kong

- Portrait of Tang
- Born: Tang Cheuk Foo (鄧芍芙); September 27, 1924; Guangdong, Republic of China
- Died: March 25, 1991 (aged 66); British Hong Kong
- Other names: Tang Bik Wan, Tang Pik-wan, Tang Big-Wan, Tang Bik-Wun, Deng Shao-Fu
- Occupations: Cantonese opera singer; television actress
- Years active: 1940s–1980s
- Known for: Co-founding; Bao Bao Film Company; Bao Hua Film Company; Kam Big Film Company
- Children: Lui Oi Yin (Helen)

Chinese name
- Traditional Chinese: 鄧碧雲
- Simplified Chinese: 邓碧云
Transcriptions
Standard Mandarin
- Hanyu Pinyin: Dèng Bìyún
Yue: Cantonese
- Jyutping: Dang6 Bik1wan4
- Musical career
- Also known as: Ma-Da (妈打) or Big Sister Pik (大碧姐)

Tang Bik-wan (Chinese: 鄧碧雲) (27 September 1924 – 25 March 1991) was a former Chinese actress and a Cantonese opera singer from Hong Kong. Tang is credited with over 280 films.

== Early life ==
On 27 September 1924, Tang was born as Tang Cheuk Fu.

Tang Bik Wan was a Cantonese opera actress since she was 13 when she joined a Cantonese opera. She was a disciple of a few Cantonese opera masters and soon became the head actress for her troupe when she was 15. She was very talented and could almost play any role in the opera; hence, earning her the nickname the "multi-role actress". During the civil war, she went to Guangzhou, and then later to Hong Kong.

== Career ==
In 1950, Tang crossed over as an actress in Hong Kong films. Tang and seven great opera actresses later became sworn sisters who went by the nickname "Eight Peonies". Tang was the Blue Peony and until 1967. Tang is credited with over 280 films.

By 1968, Tang became a TV actress, performing in Rediffusion, ATV and TVB. As age caught up with her, she became the typical actress for the role as the mother of the drama's main characters, some of her most notable roles on television including the 1977 family soap opera A House Is Not a Home, the 1978 classic drama Chameleon, and the popular 1979 drama serial The Good, The Bad and The Ugly. Tang's television career reached its peak when she played the caring and intelligent family matriarch in the late 1980s long-running hit series The Seasons (hence, gaining her the nickname "Ma-Da" [Cantonese pronunciation of "mother"]). "Ma-Da" propelled her to fame, and when she continued to take movies and advertisements, she would portray the "Ma-Da" role.

== Filmography ==
=== Films ===
This is a partial list of films.

- 1950 Ciyun's Farewell in Storm and Fire (Part 1)
- 1950 Ciyun's Farewell in Storm and Fire (Part 2)
- 1950 The Gardener's Daughter - To Sheung-Yuet
- 1956 Lady with a Silver and Bitter Tongue
- 1960 Fortune
- 1960 Lady Racketeer
- 1960 The Love Quadrangle
- 1964 Pigeon Cage (a.k.a. The Apartment of 14 Families)

== Awards ==
- Star. Avenue of Stars, Tsim Sha Tsui waterfront in Hong Kong

== Personal life ==
Tang's health began to deteriorate during her tenure in The Seasons as a result of throat cancer. Her voice on screen had been noticeably deeper and softer between two seasons of the television series after she had undergone treatment for it during the off-season hiatus. However, Tang Pik Wan, the multi-talented actress, died of a liver malfunction on March 25, 1991. Her family in her name has donated to various charity organizations in Hong Kong. There is a nursery and an old folks centre named after her.

== Gallery ==
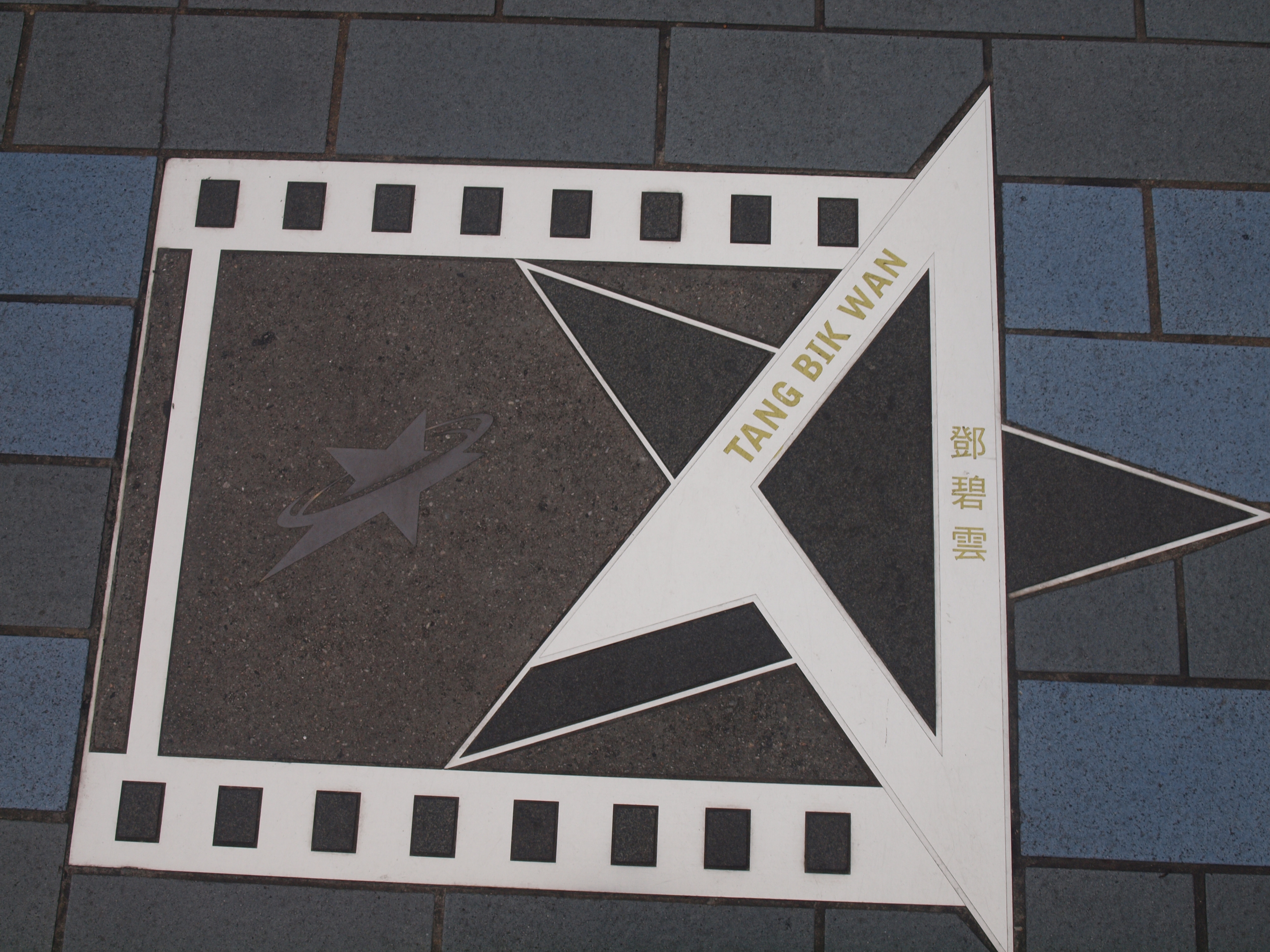
Tang at the Avenue of Stars, Hong Kong

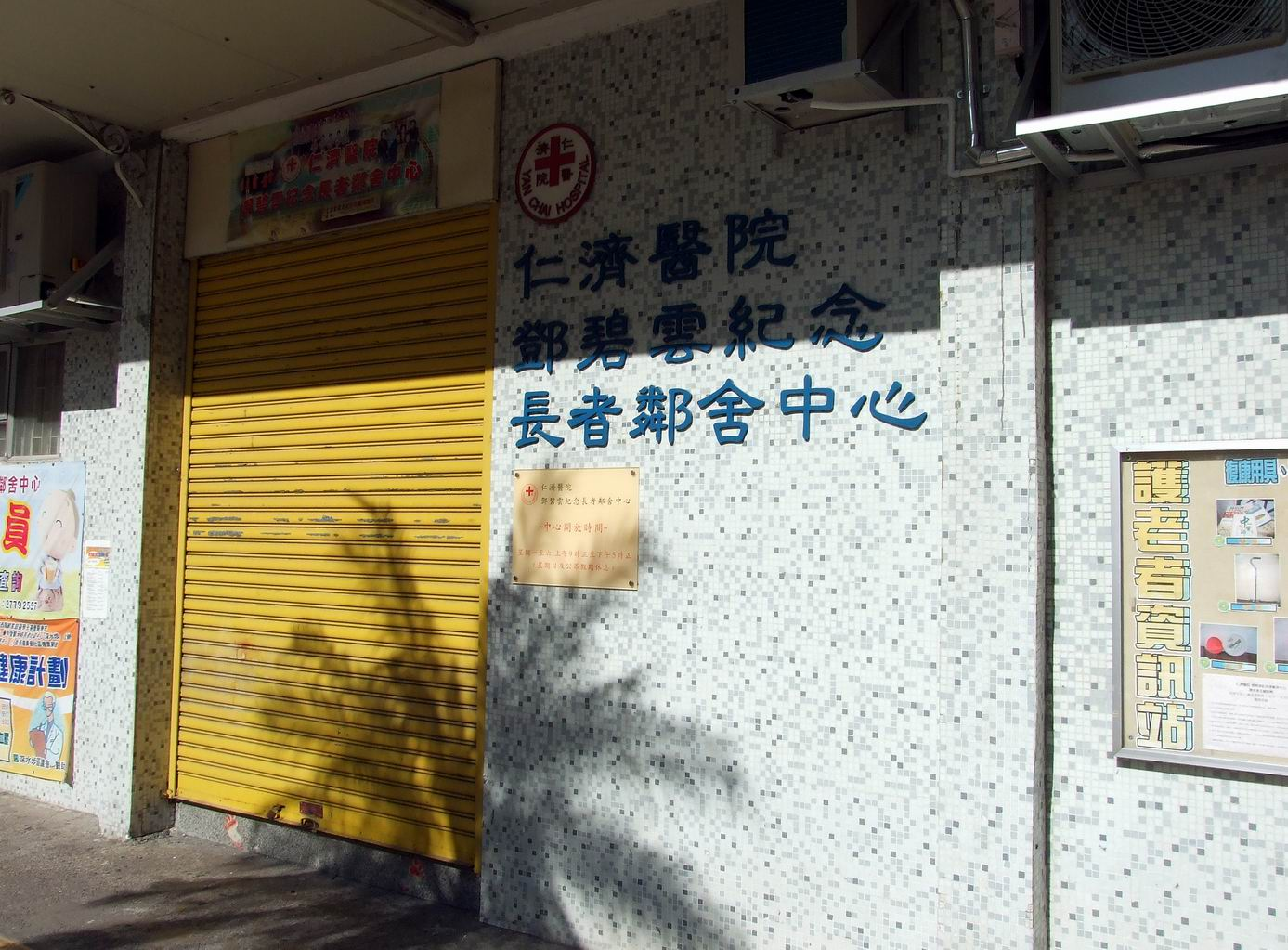
Renji Hospital Deng Biyun Memorial for the Elderly Neighbourhood Centre
