= Vengeful Beauty =

1978 Hong Kong film by Meng Hua Ho

- Film poster
- Directed by: Ho Meng Hua
- Written by: On Szeto
- Produced by: Run Run Shaw
- Starring: Norman Chui; Chen Ping; Hua Yueh; Lieh Lo
- Cinematography: Cho Wai-Kei
- Edited by: Chiang Hsing-lung
- Music by: Frankie Chan
- Production company: Shaw Brothers Studio
- Release date: 11 March 1978 (Hong Kong)
- Running time: 82 minutes
- Country: Hong Kong
- Language: Mandarin

The Vengeful Beauty (Chinese: 血芙蓉) is a 1978 Shaw Brothers film directed by Ho Meng Hua, starring Lo Lieh, Chen Ping and Norman Chu.

== Plot ==
As the trained Flying Guillotine assassins secretly working for the Emperor begin their attacks, one of the assassins (Yuen Cheung-yan) is caught by local security forces. Flying Guillotine leader Jin Gang-feng (Lo Lieh) is ordered to kill every witness including the prison interrogator and his family to keep the assassins a secret. Rong Qiu-yan (Chen Ping) returns home to find her dead husband and immediately figures Gang-feng. With her superior kung fu, she nearly kills him, but retreats to protect her unborn child. Now Gang-feng is in deep trouble. He's told the Emperor under threat of execution that all witnesses are dead. In order to keep his head, Gang-feng turns to his three adult children to quickly hunt down and kill Qiu-yan who is now attempting to reach her uncle. As the hunt begins, Qiu-yan hooks up with a former Flying Guillotine member named Ma Seng (Norman Chu) and her old martial brother Wang-jun (Yueh Hua) who both help her along the way and become rivals in their love for her.

== Cast ==
- Norman Chui
- Chen Ping
- Wang Lung Wei
- Lo Lieh
- Yueh Hua
