= Black Magic (1975 film) =

1975 Hong Kong film by Ho Meng Hua

- Film poster
- Traditional Chinese: 降頭
- Simplified Chinese: 降头
- Hanyu Pinyin: Jiàng Tóu
- Jyutping: Gong3 Tau4
- Directed by: Ho Meng Hua
- Screenplay by: Ni Kuang
- Produced by: Runme Shaw
- Starring: Ti Lung; Lo Lieh; Tien Lie; Lily Li; Ku Feng
- Cinematography: Cho Wai-kei
- Edited by: Chiang Hsing-lung
- Music by: Frankie Chan
- Production company: Shaw Brothers Studio
- Distributed by: Shaw Brothers Studio
- Release date: 2 October 1975
- Running time: 93 minutes
- Countries: Hong Kong and Malaysia
- Language: Mandarin

Black Magic is a 1975 Hong Kong horror film directed by Ho Meng Hua and starring Ti Lung, Lo Lieh, Tien Lie, Lily Li and Ku Feng. A sequel to the film was released in 1976.

== Plot ==
There is an evil magician named Shan Chien-mi. He lives in a forest and anyone who wants to wreak vengeance on their enemy comes here and asks him to kill their enemy. Then, Shan Chien-mi will get a great amount of gold from them as payment. At the same time, Master Fu Yong, a kind magician, notices that Shan Chien-mi is doing something immoral so he plans to destroy the evil magician.

Xu Nuo and his fiancée Chu-ying are deeply in love with each other and finally decide to get married. However, on the wedding day, Xu Nuo breaks up with his fiancée unexpectedly and starts a new relationship with a rich widow named Luo Yin.

In fact, Luo Yin has always been attracted to Xu Nuo so she asks Shan Chien-mi to use the Tame Head of Love to make Xu Nuo unconsciously fall in love with her. Luo Yin's goal is attained, but she is still not satisfied. She wants Xu Nuo’s former fiancée to die. Shan Chien-mi uses the Tame Head of Death to make Chu-ying suffer from an incurable disease.

Fortunately, a friend of Chu-ying’s asks Master Fu Yong for help. The magician successfully saves Chu-ying.

Master Fu Yong finds Xu Nuo in the widow's house and breaks the Tame Head of Love. After that, he fights with Shan Chien-mi and finally kills him and the widow.

== Cast ==
- Ti Lung as Xu Nuo
- Lo Lieh as Liang Chia-chieh
- Tien Lie as Mrs. Zhou / Luo Yin
- Lily Li as Wang Chu-ying
- Ku Feng as Shan Chien-mi
- Ku Wen-chung as Master Fu Yong
- Lee Sau-kei as Uncle Feng
- Elliot Ngok as Mr. Wang
- Chen Ping as Mrs. Wang
- Lam Wai-tiu as Wei Te-chin
- Lam Fung as Nuo's colleague
- Norman Chu as Nuo's colleague
- Ng Hong-sang as Nuo's colleague
- Helen Ko as Shan's patron #1
- Shum Shuk-yee as Mistress cured by Shan's patron #1
- Ofelia Yau as Bridesmaid
- Lam Siu as Doctor
- Koo Chim-hung as Doctor
- Chin Chun as Party guest
- Fung King-man as Wedding guest
- Tam Ying as Wedding guest
- Cheung Siu-lun as Party guest
