= Liuxing Hudie Jian =

1973 wuxia novel by Gu Long

- Author: Gu Long
- Original title: 流星·蝴蝶·劍
- Language: Chinese
- Genre: Wuxia
- Publisher: Laureate
- Publication date: 1973
- Publication place: Taiwan
- Media type: Print
- Pages: 617
- ISBN: 9787541002625

Liuxing Hudie Jian (traditional Chinese: 流星·蝴蝶·劍; simplified Chinese: 流星·蝴蝶·剑; pinyin: Liúxīng Húdié Jiàn; lit. 'Meteor', 'Butterfly', 'Sword') is a wuxia novel by Gu Long. It was first published in Taiwan in August 1973 by Laureate (桂冠) and subsequently reproduced by other publishing companies. It has been adapted into the 1976 film Killer Clans, a 1978 television series produced by Hong Kong's CTS, the 1993 film Butterfly and Sword, a 2003 mainland Chinese television series, and a franchise of video games.

== Plot ==
In the jianghu (martial artists' community), there are two major martial arts clans engaged in an intense rivalry. On one side stands the Dragon Gate Clan (龍門幫) led by "Old Uncle" Sun Yubo (「老伯」孫玉伯). On the other side is the Twelve Flying Peng Clan (十二飛鵬幫) led by "King of Ten Thousand Pengs" Fan Xuan (「萬鵬王」范璇).

Apart from the two clans, there is an assassin organisation led by "Boss Gao" Gao Jiping (「高老大」高寄萍), who pretends to operate a brothel called Forest of Delight (快活林). Gao Jiping has adopted and trained four orphans to serve as assassins under her: Ye Xiang (葉翔), Shi Qun (石群), Meng Xinghun (孟星魂), and Xiaohe (小何).

Lü Xiangchuan (律香川), Sun Yubo's deputy, has long wanted to kill his boss but he knows he cannot do so on his own. He secretly makes a deal with Gao Jiping, who sends Meng Xinghun to assassinate Sun Yubo. However, Lü Xiangchuan's plan ultimately fails and he dies at the hands of his friend who has remained loyal to the clan. Gao Jiping commits suicide after the loss of her four assassins: Meng Xinghun falls in love with Sun Die, marries her and joins Sun Yubo; Ye Xiang is killed; Xiaohe survives but becomes disabled; only Shi Qun is still alive and well.

Around the same time, internal conflict breaks out within the Twelve Flying Peng Clan. Although Fan Xuan emerges victorious, he also loses many of his loyal followers. After these incidents, the major clans have sustained heavy losses so they are forced to put aside their rivalry. Peace is restored in the jianghu.

== Adaptations ==
Year	Production	Main cast	Additional information
1976	Shaw Brothers Studio	Cheng Ping, Ku Feng	See Killer Clans
1978	CTS		See Meteor, Butterfly, Sword (1978)
1993	Chang-Hong Channel Film & Video Co.	Tony Leung, Jimmy Lin, Donnie Yen, Michelle Yeoh	See Butterfly and Sword
2003		Adam Cheng, Norman Chui	See Meteor, Butterfly, Sword (2003)
2010	CCTV-1	Baron Chen, Rebecca Wang, Ivy Chen	See Meteor, Butterfly, Sword (2010)

== Meteor, Butterfly, Sword (mobile game) ==
Meteor, Butterfly, Sword (mobile game) is a 2018 free-to-play action game published in game markets including mainland China, Hong Kong, Macao and Taiwan regions, and Japan. The story of Meteor, Butterfly, Sword is based on a martial arts novel, Liuxing Hudie Jian. In the game, the character continues to fight and pass the levels and chapters to reach the next one. The character will also be in the process of unlocking his own ability attributes and various weapons. The development and operating process is supported by Thunder Fire UX.
