= Lee Heung-kam =

Hong Kong actress (1932–2021)

Lee Heung-Kam
- 李香琴
- Born: Lee Sui-Kam (李瑞琴); 13 January 1932; Shunde, Foshan, Guangdong, China
- Died: 4 January 2021 (aged 88); Queen Elizabeth Hospital, Hong Kong
- Other name: Lee Hong-kum
- Occupations: Actress; singer
- Years active: 1946–2012
- Spouse: Siu Chung-kwan (m. 1950)
- Children: 1
- Awards: TVB Anniversary Awards – Life Achievement Award; 2011 Lifetime Achievement

Chinese name
- Traditional Chinese: 李香琴
- Simplified Chinese: 李香琴
Transcriptions
Standard Mandarin
- Hanyu Pinyin: Lǐ Xiāngqín
Yue: Cantonese
- Jyutping: Lei^{5} Hoeng^{1} Kam^{4}
- Musical career
- Also known as: 琴姐, 嫲嫲, 二幫王, 西宫琴
- Genres: Cantonese Opera, Cantopop
- Labels: WSM Music Group Ltd., TVB

Signature
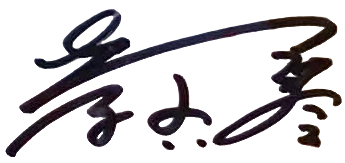

Lee Heung-kam (13 January 1932 – 4 January 2021) was a Hong Kong Cantonese opera singer and TVB actress.

== Career ==
She joined the entertainment industry when she was 14 years old. Since 1960, she became known for being an antagonist in many Cantonese operas, films and TV drama series. This lasted until the 80's when her roles were re-typecasted as a kind mother or a spiteful mother-in-law.

Over a career spanning more than 70 years, Lee portrayed mother, mother-in-law, and grandmother roles in numerous Chinese films and television productions. Her performances often focused on characters with different personalities and emotional traits.

Lee was also the god-mother of many celebrities, for example Chow Yun-fat, Carol Cheng, Cherie Chung, Andy Lau, Maggie Cheung etc.

In 1972, Lee joined TVB. Lee was known for Enjoy Yourself Tonight.

In 1974, Lee and Tam Ping-man, an actor and on-screen partner, co-founded a production company. One of their most popular duets is Can You Come Back, which was featured in the comedy Rose Rose I Love You in 1993, they performed this song many times on stage together.

== Filmography ==
Aliases: Li Hsiang-Chun, Li Xiang-Jun

=== Films ===
Thus is a partial list of films.

- 1960 Lady Racketeer
- 1960 Miss Pony-Tail
- 1960 Rear Entrance - Mandy Hui Shuk Wan
- 1961 The Pistol - Lu Xiao-Yin
- 1961 The Witch-Girl, He Yue'er
- 1961 The Golden Trumpet
- 1962 Dream of the Red Chamber - 1st Master's wife
- 1962 The Mid-Nightmare
- 1962 Yang Kwei Fei - Lady Mei/Jiang Cai Pin
- 1962 When Fortune Smiles
- 1963 The Love Eterne - Student
- 1963 The Adulteress - Yang's Wife
- 1963 Return of the Phoenix - Cheng Xue-E
- 1963 Mid-Nightmare (Part 2)
- 1963 Boundan
- 1964 Comedy of Mismatches - Sun Zhuyi (Guest Star)
- 1965 Move Over, Darling
- 1966 Dawn Will Come - Yan Qiurong
- 1967 A Gifted Scholar and a Beautiful Maid (aka Merry Maid)
- 1967 The Golden Swallow
- 1967 The Long Journey Home - Madam Chui
- 1967 Madame Lee Sze-Sze (aka Li Shi-Shi)
- 1967 Maiden Thief
- 1967 Making a Living in a Blind Way
- 1967 Terrors Over Nothing
- 1967 Uproar in Jade Hall - Chun-Fa
- 1967 Who Should Be the Commander-in-Chief?
- 1968 The Land of Many Perfumes - Empress
- 1969 The Three Lucky Men
- 1969 Raw Passions - Tao Ai Jun
- 1969 Dark Semester - Lin Hui Wo
- 1970 The Young Girl Dares Not Homeward (aka Girl Wanders Around) - Miss Hua
- 1970 The Lucky Trio Are Here Again
- 1977 Love Rings a Bell
- 1958/1959 Story of the Vulture Conqueror
- 1959 Story of the White-Haired Demon Girl
- 1991 Dances with Dragon
- 1992 All's Well, Ends Well
- 1993 The Bride with White Hair 2
- 1996 Thanks for Your Love
- 2009 All's Well, Ends Well 2009
- 2010 All's Well, Ends Well 2010
- 2010 Bruce Lee, My Brother
- 2011 All's Well, Ends Well 2011
- 2012 All's Well, Ends Well 2012
- 2012 Eight Happiness 2012

=== TV Series ===
Year	Title	Role	Notes/Ref.
1976	Hotel (1976 TV series)	Ching Wong Mei-or	(TVB)
1977	A House Is Not a Home	Sze Li Mo-yung	(TVB)
1978	Conflict		(TVB)
1978	Below the Lion Rock		(RTHK)
1979	The Good, the Bad and the Ugly	Fong Yeung Hing-wan	(TVB)
1980	The Brothers	So Sui-Fong	(TVB)
1980	Five Easy Pieces		(TVB)
1982	Demi-Gods and Semi-Devils	Queen	(TVB)
1982	Love and Passion	Yuen Dai-Neung	(TVB)
1984	The New Adventures of Chor Lau-heung	Kam Tai-kwan	(TVB)
1985	The Yang's Saga	To Dai-Neung	(TVB)
1986	New Heavenly Sword and Dragon Sabre	Mit-Juet Si Tai	(TVB)
1986	The Return of Luk Siu Fung	Mrs. Fa	(TVB)
1986	Heir to the Throne Is...	Koon Chung-yuen's mother	(TVB)
1987	The Grand Canal	Empress Dugu	(TVB)
1988	The Final Verdict		(TVB)
1989	The Justice of Life	Ho Mei-Lai	(TVB)
1991	Days of Glory		(ATV)
1991	The Cops Affairs		(ATV)
1991	Who is the Winner		(ATV)
1992	Shanghai Godfather		(ATV)
1992	Who is the Winner II		(ATV)
1993	Silver Tycoon		(ATV)
1993	Shanghai Godfather II		(ATV)
1994	Movie Tycoon		(ATV)
1994	Midnight Lovers II		(ATV)
1996	The Little Vagrant Lady II		(ATV)
1996	The Little Vagrant Lady		(ATV)
1996	The Good Old Days	Kam Fung-Chi	Won – Best Supporting Actress, (ATV)
1997	The Pride of Chao Zhou		(ATV)
2004	Love in a Miracle	Sun Gong Tsui-Fong	(ATV)
2005	Happy Family	Bak Suet	(ATV)
2006	Walled Village	Mui Tsui-tsui	(ATV)
2008	Moonlight Resonance	Sheh Kwan-lai	Nominated – Best Supporting Actress (Top 5), (TVB)
2010	When Lanes Merge	Lei Suk-jing	(TVB)
2010	Can't Buy Me Love	Kam Tai Fu Yan	Nominated – My Favourite Female Character (Top 15), (TVB)
2012	The Greatness of a Hero	On Lau-mui	(TVB)

== Awards and Nominations ==
- Won – 1997 ATV Anniversary Awards - Best Supporting Actress – The Good Old Days
- Nominated – 2008 TVB Anniversary Awards – Best Supporting Actress – Moonlight Resonance
- Nominated – 2010 TVB Anniversary Awards – Most Popular Female Character – Can't Buy Me Love
- Won – 2011 TVB Lifetime Achievement Award

== Personal Life ==
In 1950, Lee married Siu Chung-kwan, a Cantonese opera singer. They had a daughter, Siu Ji-wan.

Lee had been forced to retire from acting in 2011 due to Alzheimer's disease, her condition deteriorated in December 2020.

On 4 January 2021, Lee died in Hong Kong. Lee was 88 years old. 9 days before her 89th birthday, Lee fainted while having dinner, and was pronounced dead en route to Queen Elizabeth Hospital, Hong Kong.
