= Ho Meng Hua =

Chinese film director and screenwriter in Hong Kong

- Chinese: 何夢華
- Born: January 1, 1923; Guangdong province, China
- Died: May 19, 2009 (aged 86); Hong Kong
- Other names: He Meng Hua, Hoh Mung Wa
- Occupations: Film director, screenwriter
- Years active: 1953 – 1992

Ho Meng Hua (1 January 1923 - 19 May 2009) was a Chinese film director from Shanghai, working in the Cinema of Hong Kong and the Cinema of Taiwan.

== Early life ==
In 1923, Ho was born in Guangdong province, China. Ho grew up in Shanghai, China.

== Education ==
Ho graduated from Shanghai Drama Institute.

== Career ==
In 1955, Ho joined the Shaw Brothers studio. In 1958, Ho's directorial debut was An Appointment After Dark. Ho eventually became one the studios' most prolific directors, directing about fifty films between then and 1980.

== Filmography ==
=== Films ===
- 1955 Romance in the Western Chamber - as screenwriter.
- 1956 Miss Kikuko - as assistant director.
- 1958 Red Lantern (Chinese: 借紅燈) - as director.
- 1958 An Appointment after Dark - as director.
- 1959 Day-Time Husband - as director.
- 1960 Rendezvous in the South Sea
- 1960 Malayan Affair (Chinese: 蕉風椰雨) - as director, screenwriter.
- 1964 Between Tears and Smiles - co-director
- 1964 The Warlord and the Actress
- 1966 The Monkey Goes West
- 1966 Princess Iron Fan
- 1967 Susanna (Chinese: 珊珊) - as director.
- 1967 The Midnight Murder
- 1967 The King With My Face
- 1967 Cave of the Silken Web
- 1968 Land of Many Perfumes
- 1968 The Jade Raksha
- 1968 Killer Darts
- 1969 Vengeance Is A Golden Blade
- 1970 Lady of Steel
- 1971 The Lady Hermit
- 1971 The Long Chase
- 1972 The Black Enforcer
- 1972 The Human Goddess
- 1973 The Kiss of Death
- 1973 Ambush
- 1973 The Master of Kung Fu
- 1974 The Sinful Adultress
- 1974 Young Passion
- 1975 All Mixed Up
- 1975 The Golden Lion
- 1975 The Flying Guillotine
- 1975 Black Magic
- 1976 Black Magic 2 a.k.a. U.S. title: "Revenge of the Zombies"
- 1976 Oily Maniac - as director.
- 1976 The Criminals
- 1976 The Dragon Missile
- 1977 The Mighty Peking Man a.k.a. U.S. title: "Goliathon"
- 1978 The Vengeful Beauty
- 1978 The Psychopath
- 1978 Shaolin Handlock
- 1979 Abbot of Shaolin a.k.a. U.S. title: "A Slice Of Death"
- 1980 The Swift Sword

== Personal life ==
In 1948, Ho moved to Hong Kong.

On May 19, 2009, Ho died in Hong Kong.
