= Black Magic 2 =

1976 Hong Kong film by Ho Meng Hua

- Film poster
- Gou hun jiang tou
- Directed by: Ho Meng Hua
- Written by: Ni Kuang
- Produced by: Run Run Shaw
- Starring: Ti Lung; Lo Lieh; Liu Hui-Ju; Lily Li; Lin Wei-Tu
- Cinematography: Tsao Hui-chi
- Edited by: Chiang Hsing-Lung
- Music by: Frankie Chan
- Production company: Shaw Brothers
- Distributed by: World Northal
- Release date: 9 December 1976 (Hong Kong)
- Running time: 85 minutes
- Country: Hong Kong
- Language: Mandarin

Black Magic 2 (Cantonese: 勾魂降頭 Pinyin: Gōu Hún Jiàng Tóu), also known as Revenge of the Zombies, is a 1976 Hong Kong horror film directed by Ho Meng Hua. It is a sequel to the 1975 film Black Magic.

== Plot ==
A martial artist fights against an evil sorcerer who has raised zombies.

== Cast ==
- Ti Lung
- Lo Lieh
- Liu Hui-Ju
- Lily Li
- Lin Wei-Tu

== Release ==
Black Magic 2 was released in Hong Kong in 1976 and in the United States in 1982. The film was distributed in the United States by the now defunct World Northal Corp. and was retitled Revenge of the Zombies.

== Reception ==
Peter Dendle called it an "intense horror-cult favorite" whose "budget effects and martial arts sequences are more than compensated by sustained energy and brazen creativity."
