= A House Is Not a Home (TV series) =

Hong Kong TV series

- Chinese: 家變
- Created by: Yip Kit Hing
- Starring: Liza Wang; Simon Yam; Tang Pik-wan; Bak Man-biu; Nam Hung; Ha Yu; Lee Heung-kam
- Opening theme: "家變" (A House Is Not A Home) by Roman Tam
- Composer: Joseph Koo
- Country of origin: Hong Kong
- Original language: Cantonese
- No. of episodes: 110

Production
- Executive producer: Yip Kit Hing
- Running time: 45 minutes (110 episodes)

Original release
- Network: TVB

A House Is Not a Home (Chinese: 家變) is a 1977 TVB television series. It stars Liza Wang, Simon Yam, Ha Yu, Bak Man-biu, Tang Pik-wan and Lee Heung-kam.

== Synopsis ==
In 1970s Hong Kong, the construction industry was booming, but hidden dangers, due to corruption often jeopardized the public's safety. Lok Fai (Bak Man-biu) is one of these construction company owners. He has two wives, the first, Yuen Heng Wan (Tang Pik-wan) has 3 children including a gay son, Lok Wah (Simon Yam). Lok Fai's second wife Wong Yee Tak (Nam Hung) has two daughters, Lok Lam (Liza Wang) and Lok Man (Tsui Mei-leng).

Between the two families, sandwiches Lok's friend a banker and his lawyer son who helps to mediate between the two wives but Heng Wan and her best friend, Sze Li Mo-Yung (Lee Heung-Kam), have deep hatred for them. Lok Lam creates a magazine, but the magazine's publication has Lok Wah's nude photos! (based on the 1970s standard, it is) This causes a war among the two families, and all hell breaks loose....with the anti-corruption ICAC investigators (played by Chow Yun-fat and Bill Chan respectively) who are hot on Lok Fai's trail. With his unworthy son-in-law Ma Chun Yau (Ha Yu) taking over the business it is now up to Lok Lam to save the family business.

== History ==
The TVB drama A House Is Not a Home premiered on 1 August 1977 and had 110 episodes. Roman Tam sang the series' theme song. His performance became more popular than the theme song "Raging Tide". The series was viewed by 2.6 million people, which broke the previous record.

== Legacy ==
According to the scholars Heung-wah Wong and Hoi-yan Yau, Liza Wang's depicted Lok Lam, the heroine of the story, as a strong woman which "found great favor with Hong Kong audiences, especially young women". Numerous Hong Kong women mimicked the "Lok Lam hairstyle", which is a "straight shoulder-length cut with a wavy fringe". Career women viewed Lok Lam, a powerful woman focused on her career, as their exemplar in the several years after the drama was broadcast.

The heroine's brother was depicted as "sissy" gay man. Although a small part, during 1970s Hong Kong television, his character was "the major representation" of a gay Hong Kong man. The South China Morning Post's Lisa Cam said A House Is Not a Home made Liza Wang, Simon Yam, Ha Yu, and Tang Pik-wan "Hong Kong acting legends".
