= Bak Man-biu =

Hong Kong actor

Bak Man Biu
- Born: Chew Hong Fook (招鴻福); 1921; British Hong Kong
- Died: August 2, 2007 (aged 86); Manhattan, New York
- Occupation: Actor
- Years active: 1940s–1990s

Chinese name
- Traditional Chinese: 白文彪
- Simplified Chinese: 白文彪
Transcriptions

Bak Man Biu(1921–2007) was a veteran Hong Kong actor best known for his role as the Patriatch Lok Fai in the TVB drama A House Is Not A Home (1977).

== Career ==
Born as Chew Hong Fook in 1921, during the 1940s, Bak was involved in Cantonese Opera until the 1950s. During the 1950s, he joined the world of Chinese cinema, directing films and collaborating with the legendary director Li Han Hsiang. Bak has acted in many films ever since the 1950s till his retirement in 1996. Bak is considerably one of the best veteran actors in the industry, and is versatile in any roles he plays. He is perhaps best known as the Patriatch Lok Fai in A House Is Not a Home which became a TVB classic.

Bak has also cooperated with many leading TVB actors and actresses then including Chow Yun-fat, Liza Wang and Dodo Cheng.

Bak Man Biu died in 2007 at Manhattan, New York, aged 86.

== Filmography ==
Year	Title	Role
1956	The Precious Lotus Lamp	
1958	Sweet Girl in Terror	
1958	The Butterfly Spirit	
1958	The Fairy Shepherdess	
1959	How Oriole the Heroine Solved the Case of the Three Dead Bodies	
1959	On the Road to Success (Part 2)	
1959	On the Road to Success (Part 1)	
1959	Till Death Us Do Part (Part 1)	
1959	Judge Bao's Night Trial of the Living Dead	
1961	Fan to Remember	
1961	Riot in the Palace	
1961	Witness for the Prosecution	
1961	The Warrior in Red Butterfly (Part 2)	
1961	Lucky Child Granted by Heaven	
1962	The Road to the West	
1962	All Because of a Smile	
1962	The Birth of Yue Fei	
1962	Three Petitions	
1962	The Heroes and the Beauty	
1962	The 7 Tyrants of Jiangnan	
1962	The Birth of the Monkey King	
1963	The Swordsman and the Swordswoman	
1963	Women's World	
1963	Story of the Sword and the Sabre (Part 1)	
1963	The Magnificent Ones (Part 1)	
1964	The Conquering Sword	
1964	Romantic Musketeer	
1964	Childless Wife	
1965	Beautiful Queen of Hell	
1965	A Drop of Chivarous Blood (Part 1)	
1965	The Invincible Book from Heaven (Part 1)	
1965	The Powerful Fist of a Thousand Hands (Part 2)	
1965	The Powerful Fist of a Thousand Hands (Part 1)	
1965	The Three Sisters (Part 2)	
1965	The Six-fingered Lord of the Lute (Part 2)	
1966	Fire Dragon and the Mythical Pearl	
1966	Sacred Fire, Heroic Wind (Part 2)	
1966	Sacred Fire, Heroic Wind (Part 1)	
1966	The Golden Bat	
1967	How the Sacred Fire Heroic Winds Defeat the Fire Lotus Array	
1967	Terrors Over Nothing	
1967	The Legend of Gods and Goddesses	
1967	The Butterfly Legend	Advisor
1967	Waste Not Our Youth	Doctor
1967	I Love A-Go-Go	
1968	Dangerous Seventeen	
1968	Decree of the Fire Dragon	
1968	The Flower and the Sword	
1968	Huang Feihong: Duel for the Championship	
1968	Huang Feihong: The Invincible Lion Dancer	
1968	A Great Lover	
1968	Huang Feihong: The Eight Bandits	
1968	Flag of Pearls	
1968	Nu Zha's Adventure in the Eastern Sea	
1968	The Avenging Sword	
1968	How Huang Feihong Vanquished the Monster and Conquered the 9 Fractions	
1968	The Deadly Dragon Sword	
1968	Duel at the Supreme Gate	
1969	Huang Feihong's Combat with the Five Wolves	
1969	The Invincible	
1969	The Gentleman Sword	
1969	Silver Knife, Scarlet Blade	
1969	Huang Feihong: The Duel for the Sha-Yu-Qing	
1969	Mad Dragon	
1969	The Fragrant Sword	
1970	Quick Swordsman	
1970	Xiu Niang	
1970	Modern School Life	
1971	Bloody Claw	
1971	The Blade Spares None	Ho Chen
1976	Luk Siu Fung	
1977	Love In Hawaii	Mr Loo
1977	The Discharged	
1977	Mantis Fists and Tiger Claws of Shaolin	
1977	Sword Stained with Royal Blood	Wan Fong-san
1978	Edge of Fury	Sam, old retainer
1978	The Heaven Sword and Dragon Saber	
1979	Crazy Boy and Pop-Eye	
1979	Chor Lau-heung	
1980	The Wonderful Hong Kong	
1981	Crazy Nuts	
1981	Don't Kill Me, Brother!	Uncle Lung
1981	Mahjong Heroes	Uncle Jin
1981	Avengers from Hell	
1982	Interpol	
1982	Brothers from Walled City	Ninth Uncle
1982	Outlaw Genes	
1982	The Legend of the Condor Heroes	
1983	The Bund	
1983	Seeding of a Ghost	Taoist
1983	Red Panther	Kiang's dad
1983	Top Fit	Black Bow Tie
1984	The Duke of Mount Deer	
1984	The Return of Wong Fei Hung	
1986	Fury of the Heaven	
1986	Missed Date	Mei's dad
1987	The Legend of the Book and the Sword	Muk Cheuk-lun
1988	The Dragon Family	Ho San
1988	Twilight of a Nation	Mung Tak-Yan
1989	Seven Warriors	
1990	Her Fatal Ways	Tzu's Taiwanese friend
1990	Mortuary Blues	Uncle Piao
1991	Mainland Dundee	
1991	Her Fatal Ways II	Min's friend on tour bus
1991	Today's Hero	Uncle Chung
1991	Fist of Fury 1991	Bill
1992	92 Legendary La Rose Noire	Uncle #2 at Fan's wedding
1992	Fist of Fury 1991 II	
1992	Battle Field in Hell	
1993	My Hero II	Sau's buddy
1993	Boys Are Easy	
1993	Last Hero in China	Uncle Cheung
1994	The Third Full Moon	
