= Killer Clans =

1976 Hong Kong film by Chor Yuen

- Film poster
- 流星·蝴蝶·剑
- Directed by: Chor Yuen
- Screenplay by: Ni Kuang
- Based on: Meteor, Butterfly, Sword by Gu Long
- Produced by: Run Run Shaw
- Starring: Chung Wa; Chen Ping; Ku Feng; Yueh Hua; Lo Lieh
- Cinematography: Chen Ching-Shen
- Edited by: Huang Chieh
- Music by: Chen Yung-Yu
- Production company: Shaw Brothers Studio
- Release date: 20 March 1976 (Hong Kong)
- Running time: 91 minutes
- Country: Hong Kong
- Language: Mandarin

Killer Clans is a 1976 Hong Kong martial arts film directed by Chor Yuen and produced by the Shaw Brothers Studio. The film is loosely based on the novel Liuxing Hudie Jian by Gu Long.

== Cast ==
- Chung Wa
- Chen Ping
- Ku Feng
- Yueh Hua
- Lo Lieh
- Wong Chung
- Cheng Li
- Fan Mei Sheng
- Yeung Chi Hing
- Ling Yun
- Alan Chui Chung-San
