= The Brave Archer (disambiguation) =

The Brave Archer is a 1977 Hong Kong film directed by Chang Cheh.

The Brave Archer may also refer to other films directed by Chang Cheh:

- The Brave Archer 2, a 1979 film
- The Brave Archer 3, a 1981 film
- The Brave Archer and His Mate (a.k.a. The Brave Archer 4), a 1982 film
