= Chan Shen =

Taiwanese-born Hong Kong film actor

- Chan Shen
- Born: Chan Yi-Cheng; 11 March 1940; Taichung, Taiwan
- Died: 26 April 1984 (aged 44); Hong Kong
- Occupation: Actor
- Years active: 1971—1984

Chinese name
- Traditional Chinese: 詹森
Transcriptions

Chan Shen (11 March 1940 - 26 April 1984) was a Taiwanese-born Hong Kong film actor who worked extensively in Hong Kong action cinema during the 1970s and 1980s.

Born in Taichung, Taiwan, and entered the film industry after attracting the attention of director Sung Tsun-shou. He subsequently worked extensively for Shaw Brothers in Hong Kong, and frequently appeared in supporting or villainous roles.

News reports state that he died of a heart attack while taking a shower at the age of 44.

== Filmography ==
- Shi wan qing nian shi wan jun (1967) - Japanese Soldier
- The Swift Knight (1971) - brothel owner
- The Golden Seal (1971) - Wu Tian Ting
- The Oath of Death (1971) - doubles Ma in death scene
- The Golden Lion (1971) - Brother Eight
- Long Road to Freedom (1971)
- Six Assassins (1971) - Yu Li-De
- The Rescue (1971) - Chief
- The Lady Professional (1971) - Shi Yun Pu
- King Boxer (1972) - Wan Hung-Chieh
- The Fugitive (1972) - Lau Lo Sham
- The Deadly Knives (1972) - Ishikawa
- Intimate Confessions of a Chinese Courtesan (1972) - Master Li Zhang An
- The Devil's Mirror (1972) - Chief Bai's bodyguard
- The Young Avenger (1972) - Mad Monk
- The Gourd Fairy (1972)
- Stranger in Hong Kong (1972) - Ting Ta-Chuan
- The Imperial Swordsman (1972) - giant
- The Fourteen Amazons (1972) - Hsia soldier w. signal arrow
- The Bamboo House of Dolls (1973) - Japanese shoots US pilot
- Call to Arms (1973) - Prince of Wei
- Payment in Blood (1973)
- The Master of Kung Fu (1973) - Mai Gen
- The Kiss of Death (1973) - Atom
- Ambush (1973) - Han Chung
- The Villains (1973)
- Facets of Love (1973) - Brothel client
- Heroes of Sung (1973) - Zongba
- The Bastard (1973) - Ji Wen Tai
- The House of 72 Tenants (1973) - Brother Shum
- The Happiest Moment (1973) - Rickshaw puller
- Sex, Love and Hate (1974) - thug after Jun
- The Golden Lotus (1974) - killer
- Gossip Street (1974) - Godfather's thug
- Hong Kong 73 (1974) - Policeman
- Sinful Confession (1974) - Juan's husband
- The Rat Catcher (1974) - gangster
- Sorrow of the Gentry (1974) - Captain Wang
- The Tea House (1974) - Shen Fan Ming (cameo)
- Dracula and the 7 Golden Vampires (1974) - Kah, villainous monk
- Rivals of Kung Fu (1974) - Ah Kwun
- The Shadow Boxer (1974) - Yuan
- Village of Tigers (1974)
- Night of the Devil's Bride (1975)
- All Mixed Up (1975)
- Evil Seducers (1975)
- Forbidden Tales of Two Cities (1975) - Wang
- The Imposter (1975) - Bandit searched by Liang
- The Big Holdup (1975) - Qing, cop
- The Spiritual Boxer (1975) - Master Lin
- The Bloody Escape (1975) - Junshi
- Bloody Money (1975) - Chief Constable
- Cleopatra Jones and the Casino of Gold (1975) - Soo Da Chen
- The Protectors (1975) - Kasha (Thousand Hands Buddha)
- Cuties Parade (1975)
- Lady of the Law (1975) - Officer Yan Bixian
- Lover's Destiny (1975) - Ding, Zhang's Adjutant
- The Magic Blade (1976) - Kung Sun Tao
- Emperor Chien Lung (1976) - Priest
- Crazy Sex (1976) - One of Big Boss Men
- King Gambler (1976) - Mr Li (Shi's sidekick)
- The Web of Death (1976) - Venom clan section chief
- The Criminals (1976) - 3)
- The Condemned (1976) - Mr Liang
- Killer Clans (1976) - Roc Society member
- The Drug Connection (1976) - Long Tou
- Brotherhood (1976) - Fan Nan
- Wedding Nights (1976)
- Love Swindler (1976) - 2) David
- The Last Tempest (1976) - palace guard
- Homicides: The Criminals Part II (1976) - 3: Fa
- The Sentimental Swordsman (1977) - junior monk
- He Has Nothing But Kung Fu (1977)
- The Brave Archer (1977) - Ling Tze
- The Mad Monk (1977) - Qian Ru-Ming
- Death Duel (1977) - Leader of Hei Sha Clan
- The Adventures of Emperor Chien Lung (1977) - officer collecting tax
- Moods of Love (1977) - Lao San
- Pursuit of Vengeance (1977) - Gong Sun-Duan
- The Call Girls (1977) - Japanese tourist
- Clans of Intrigue (1977) - Boss at Inn
- The Dream of the Red Chamber (1977) - priest
- Assault: The Criminals Part IV (1977) - 2) Cai
- Judgement of an Assassin (1977) - 7th Branch Chief Yian Chun
- Dreams of Eroticism (1977) - Jia Zhen
- To Kill a Jaguar (1977) - Tin Pa
- Jade Tiger (1977) - Liu
- The 36th Chamber of Shaolin (1978) - Abbot in charge of Wrist Chamber
- Invincible Shaolin (1978) - Master Mai Qi, South Shaolin
- Heaven Sword and Dragon Sabre (1978) - Kwan Lun School Chief Ho
- The Brave Archer 2 (1978) - Spiritual Wisdom
- The Voyage of Emperor Chien Lung (1978) - Zhang's brothers teacher
- Swordsman And Enchantress (1978) - zombie fighter
- Shaolin Hand Lock (1978) - Fang Yu Biao
- The Proud Youth (1978) - Priest Zhishan
- The Mad Monk Strikes Again (1978) - Master Sun Jia Zhu
- Hello Sexy Late Homecomers (1978)
- The Psychopath (1978)
- Heaven Sword and Dragon Sabre, Part II (1978) - Kwun Lun School Chief Ho
- Clan of Amazons (1978) - Lu Wenhu
- Soul of the Sword (1978) - swordsman
- Legend of the Bat (1978) - Auctioner
- The Daredevils (1979) - Chief of Staff Xu
- Funny Children (1979)
- The Kung-Fu Instructor (1979) - Fake Brother
- Heaven and Hell (1979)
- Abbot of Shaolin (1979) - Dan Tian-Gang
- Shaolin Rescuers (1979) - Zhou Cheng
- The Proud Twins (1979) - Chief of 10 Villains
- The Last Judgement (1979)
- Invincible Enforcer (1979) - Ho Yin Wong
- The Deadly Breaking Sword (1979) - Fan Fei, custodial officer
- The Brothers (1979) - Boss Huang Shou Ren
- Full Moon Scimitar (1979) - Robber with coffin
- Return of the Dead (1979) - Da-Yan
- Rendezvous with Death (1980) - Chi Sifang
- The Flag of Iron (1980) - Eagle Hall Chief Mi Jiu Gao
- Hex Versus Witchcraft (1980) - Brother Nine
- Haunted Tales (1980) - Ah Cheng
- A Deadly Secret (1980) - Monk Bo Cheung
- Swift Sword (1980) - Leng Ruyun
- Lost Souls (1980) - Hok
- The Kid with a Tattoo (1980) - man in wheelchair
- The Tiger and the Widow (1980) - Dong Jin Piao
- Young Outcasts (1980)
- Every Man for Himself (1980)
- Emperor Chien Lung and the Beauty (1980) - Wan Tzu Mu
- Bat Without Wings (1980) - Ghost King
- Revenge of the Corpse (1981)
- Gambler's Delight (1981) - Madam Jin's thug
- The Battle for the Republic of China (1981)
- What Price Honesty? (1981) - prison chief
- The Imp (1981) - Old Uncle Han
- Notorious Eight (1981) - Hu's man
- Challenge of the Gamesters (1981) - Huang Jiang
- Sword Stained with Royal Blood (1981) - Master Rong (Lung Yau Sch's chief)
- Bloody Parrot (1981) - Master San
- The Emperor and His Brother (1981) - Ching henchman
- Tiger Killer (1982) - Master Zhang
- The 82 Tenants (1982) - Sgt Chiang
- Passing Flickers (1982) - Fa Hai
- The Brave Archer and His Mate (1982) - Senior Teacher Or
- Coolie Killer (1982)
- Five Element Ninjas (1982) - Chief Hong
- My Rebellious Son (1982) - one of Tang's men
- The Emperor and the Minister (1982) - Boss Han
- Godfather from Canton (1982) - Secret Service Officer
- Ode to Gallantry (1982) - Bai
- Fast Fingers (1983) - Adulterer
- Shaolin and Wu Tang (1983) - Shaolin Abbot
- Shaolin Prince (1983) - Abbot of Shaolin Temple
- Holy Flame of the Martial World (1983) - Shaolin Clan Leader
- Usurpers of Emperor's Power (1983) - Advisor Zhao Pu
- Shaolin Intruders (1983) - Head Abbot
- Bastard Swordsman (1983) - Guardian of the Law
- Take Care, Your Majesty (1983) - brothel patron
- Lust from Love of a Chinese Courtesan (1984) - Officer Fu
- Wits of the Brats (1984) - Shih Chun
- Pale Passion (1984) - Uncle Liu
- Return of the Bastard Swordsman (1984) - Chi Song
- Opium and the Kung-Fu Master (1984) - Mr Lu
- Crazy Shaolin Disciples (1985) - His Highness
- Disciples of the 36th Chamber (1985) - School Officer Sha Duo'er
- Pursuit of a Killer (1985) - Uncle Zhi
