= Chinatown Kid =

1977 Hong Kong film by Chang Cheh

- Film poster

Chinese name
- Traditional Chinese: 唐人街功夫小子
- Simplified Chinese: 唐人街功夫小子
Transcriptions
Standard Mandarin
- Hanyu Pinyin: Tángrénjiē Gōngfu Xiǎozi
Yue: Cantonese
- Jyutping: Tong4jan4gaai1 Gung1fu1 Siu2zi2
- Directed by: Chang Cheh
- Written by: Chang Cheh; Ni Kuang
- Story by: James Wong
- Produced by: Sir Run Run Shaw
- Starring: Alexander Fu Sheng
- Cinematography: Kung Mu-To
- Edited by: Chiang Hsing-Lung
- Music by: Chen Yung-Yu
- Production company: Shaw Brothers Studio
- Distributed by: World Northal (USA); Creswin Distribution (Canada)
- Release date: 22 December 1977
- Running time: 120 minutes (international release); 90 minutes (HK release); 86 minutes (Celestial remaster)
- Country: Hong Kong
- Languages: Mandarin; Cantonese

Chinatown Kid (Chinese: 唐人街功夫小子) is a 1977 kung fu film directed by Chang Cheh. Produced by the Shaw Brothers, it stars Alexander Fu Sheng and the Venom Mob. The film deals with drugs, police corruption and gang warfare in San Francisco's Chinatown district.

== Plot ==
Struggling to survive the murderous gang wars of Hong Kong, Tan Tung (Alexander Fu Sheng), a young martial arts street fighter, successfully takes on all challengers—until he runs up against the savage underworld empire of Hong Kong's Triad mafia. Escaping to San Francisco, he again tangles with criminal gangs, but this time fights his way to the top of the city's most feared gangster organization led by the White Dragon boss (Philip Kwok). Eventually, his rise to power leads to a final, murderous, gang-land war for control of all Chinatown. Tan Tung must decide whether he will use his skills to fight for evil, or to help his friend Yang Chien-wen (Sun Chien).

== Cast ==
- Alexander Fu Sheng as Tan Tung
- Sun Chien as Yang Chien-wen
- Jenny Tseng as Yvonne/Lee Wa Fung
- Philip Kwok as Hsiao Pai-lung, the boss of White Dragon gang
- Lo Mang as Huang Hu-ti, the boss of Green Tiger gang
- Shirley Yu as Lena Chen
- Siu Yam-yam as Hsin Wa
- Wang Lung-wei as Xu Hao
- Tsai Hung as Wan
- Wong Lik as Wan's right-hand man
- Ching Ho Wang as Tan Tung's grandfather
- Chih Ching-wang as Chinese restaurant owner
- Dick Wei as Huang's henchman
- Chiang Sheng as Hsiao's henchman
- Lu Feng as Hsiao's henchman
- Kara Hui as hostage

== Production ==
Chang Cheh began planning for the film in 1976 and had shot some scenes in Hong Kong before putting the project on hold for a year to complete Shaolin Temple, The Naval Commandos, and The Brave Archer. Filming took place in Hong Kong, Taiwan, and the United States. Chang spent four days shooting on location in San Francisco's Chinatown. Due to not having secured a permit, much of the footage was taken in secret. Portions of the Chinatown district were later recreated on a sound stage at the Shaw Brothers Studio.

Before filming wrapped, Chang was persuaded by Sir Run Run Shaw to add a shooting scene after the latter learned of the Golden Dragon massacre that took place in San Francisco months after their U.S. visit. The event was later used to fuel publicity for the picture shortly before its theatrical debut.

== Reception ==
Chinatown Kid was negatively compared to Chang's previous films, notably Boxer From Shantung which followed a similar premise, and was criticized as a less impactful iteration of the director's trademark 'Rise and Fall' Tragic Hero archetype that failed to break any new ground. However, it became a cult hit in the United States. Critics at Cinapse felt the film provided social commentary on the lives of migrant workers within the Chinese American community and an almost cynical critique of the American Dream. In 2022, the film was cited as having resonated with marginalized groups within the States through its depiction of a character experiencing oppression and poverty and resorting to organized crime to survive.

Alexander Fu Sheng and Sun Chien received praise for their performances. One critic described their opposing yet complimentary characteristics as one of the film's strongest points. The character of Tung was described as Fu's "most mature and heartbreaking work" while the film has been credited as helping the actor achieve international recognition in the States.

== Censorship and alternate cuts ==
The film's depiction of gang violence and drug use resulted in several scenes being cut from its theatrical releases in Taiwan and Southeast Asia. Actress Siu Yam-yam revealed that, to ensure the film would get a release in Malaysia, an alternate ending was filmed where Tung is killed instead of being arrested,

At least three endings for the film are known to exist, one in which Tung and the gangs are arrested and another in which he is stabbed in his fight and dies of his injuries. According to Chang, a third ending was shot that was not included in either its international or original release: supposedly, Tung was to be pursued by police onto a bridge where he would then fall to his death.

The remastered version by Celestial Pictures saw 42 scenes previously unseen in its original release being added. However, some elements of the film remained cut or heavily edited including scenes of Tung's interactions with the gangs and Yvonne while Yang's storyline was pushed to the forefront to give the film a more moralistic and family-friendly tone. Kara Hui and Tsai Hung's scenes were also removed in the Celestial version. As a result, this version had the shortest run time totaling 86 minutes.
