= Kara Wai =

Hong Kong actress

Kara Wai BBS
- 惠英紅
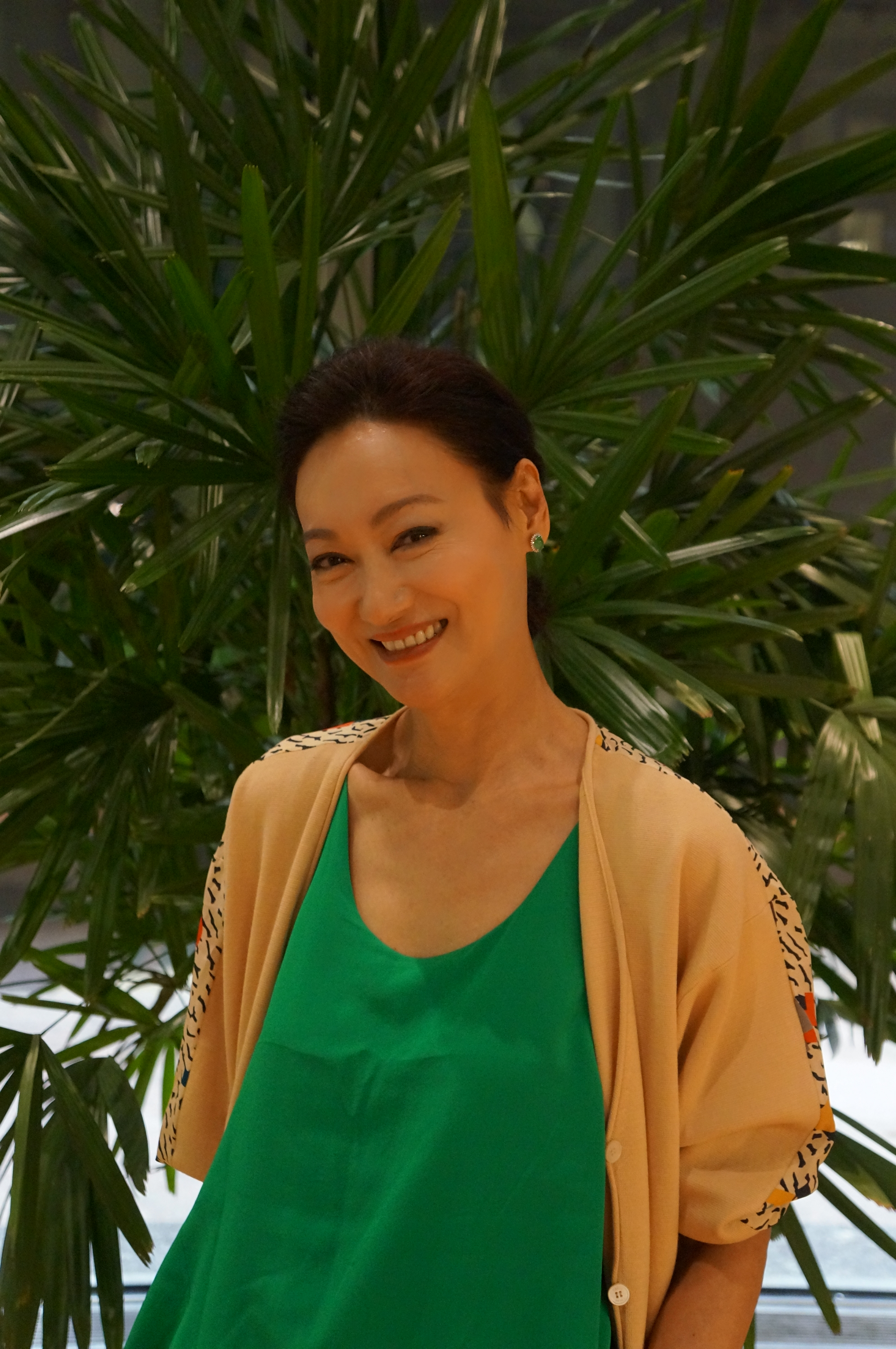
- Wai at the USA Smithsonian Institution world premiere of Happiness on 15 July 2016
- Born: British Hong Kong
- Other name: Kara Hui
- Occupation: Actress
- Years active: 1976–present
- Family: Austin Wai (brother)
- Awards: Changchun Film Festival; Best Actress; 2010 At the End of Daybreak; Hong Kong Film Awards – Best Actress; 1982 My Young Auntie; 2010 At the End of Daybreak; 2017 Happiness; Best Supporting Actress; 2014 Rigor Mortis Hong Kong Film Critics Society Awards – Best Actress; 2010 At the End of Daybreak Asian Film Awards – Best Supporting Actress; 2010 At the End of Daybreak Golden Horse Awards – Best Leading Actress; 2017 The Bold, the Corrupt, and the Beautiful; Best Supporting Actress; 2009 At the End of Daybreak Asian Television Awards – Best Actress; 2017 Affairs of the Heart TVB Anniversary Award – Best Actress; 2019 The Defected

Chinese name
- Traditional Chinese: 惠英紅
- Simplified Chinese: 惠英红
Transcriptions
Standard Mandarin
- Hanyu Pinyin: Huì Yīng Hóng
Yue: Cantonese
- Jyutping: Wai^{6} Jing^{1} Hung^{4}

Kara Wai Ying-hung BBS (simplified Chinese: 惠英红; traditional Chinese: 惠英紅) is a Hong Kong actress best known internationally for her roles in wuxia films produced by the Shaw Brothers Studio in the 1970s and 1980s.

Wai has since portrayed a wide range of roles on screen and on television with much success. She is the inaugural and a three-time recipient of Hong Kong Film Award for Best Actress. Her portrayal of a mother in the 2009 film At the End of Daybreak won her acting awards at the Hong Kong Film Awards, Hong Kong Film Critics Society Awards, Changchun Film Festival, Pacific Meridian, Asian Film Awards, and Golden Horse Awards. In following years, she went on to win multiple acting trophies throughout Asia Pacific from film roles, making her one of the most celebrated Hong Kong actresses.

On 1 July 2018, she was awarded Bronze Bauhinia Star (BBS) by the Chief Executive of Hong Kong Special Administration Region, in recognition of her contribution to the Hong Kong film industry and acting performances.

== Personal life ==
Born in Hong Kong, she is the fourth oldest out of six children. She is of Manchu descent. Her elder brother was Austin Wai. In her early years, Wai's family resided in the poor shanty town of Rennie's Mill. She did not continue her education beyond completing primary school. In her interview on Be My Guest, Wai revealed her family lost their savings due to her father's business acquaintances. Left penniless, Wai's mother, herself, and her siblings were forced to peddle goods on the streets of Hong Kong. As a teen, she often sold gum and souvenirs in Wan Chai to sailors.

At the age of 14, she began taking dance lessons at the now defunct Miramar nightclub and Northern style weaponry lessons from Donnie Yen's mother, Bow-sim Mark. Wai performed Chinese dance in a nightclub for three years from age 14 to 17. Director Chang Cheh is her godfather.

In 1999, she suffered from depression, and her career was at a low ebb. She attempted suicide at the age of 40. In 2003, with the help of friends and relatives, Wai began to recover.

In March 2021, Wai expressed her support for cotton produced in Xinjiang after several companies announced they will stop purchasing cotton from the region due to concerns over forced labour from Uyghurs; a move echoed by most Chinese celebrities.

== Career ==
=== 1977–1987: Shaw Brothers Studio ===
During the film shoot for Dirty Ho (1979), the lead actress quit due to the strain of the martial arts stunts. Wai was then an extra in the film. Director Liu Chia-Liang had seen Wai's audition tape for The Brave Archer (1977) and decided to substitute her in as the lead actress. This was their first time working together. Impressed by her performance, Liu would go on to cast Wai in his other projects.

Wai reached her career apex with My Young Auntie (1982), for which she earned the Award for Best Actress at the 1st Hong Kong Film Awards.

Wai's last film with Shaw Brothers was The Eight Diagram Pole Fighter (1984).

=== 1988–2002 ===
In 1987, Wai traveled to Paris, France, to conduct a nude photoshoot for Playboy. The photos were taken by Byron Newman. The photo book was published in 1989.

=== 2003–2010: Return and TVB ===
In 2005, she quietly returned to the Hong Kong entertainment industry. In addition to film, she joined television network TVB and was nominated for a TVB Anniversary Award for Best Supporting Actress in 2009 for Rosy Business and in 2010 for A Fistful of Stances.

In 2009, Wai won the 46th Golden Horse Awards for Best Supporting Actress for her role as a possessive mother in At the End of Daybreak. The film has also won the 16th the Hong Kong Institute of Film Critics award for Best Actress, the 4th Asian Film Awards for Best Supporting Actress, the 29th Hong Kong film awards Best Actress, the 10th Chinese movie media awards "best actress", the 10th China Changchun film festival Best Actress in Vladivostok, Russia international film festival has won seven awards Best Actress.

=== 2011–present ===
Wai made her first mainland TV appearance in the series The Glamorous Imperial Concubine. She took a pay cut to play Wu Zetian in her next mainland drama, Women of the Tang Dynasty. The role garnered her a Best Supporting Actress nomination at the 13th Huading Awards.

In 2012, Wai officially transferred to the king of the arts and is now a contract actress. In 2013, Wai signed a one-year drama contract with HKTV. Her first role with them was as the Black Rose on Incredible Mama. She won Best Supporting Actress for the Malaysian film The Wedding Diary (2011) at the 2013 Golden Wau Awards, a ceremony celebrating Chinese language films in Malaysia.

In 2014, Wai won the Best Supporting Actress award at the 33rd Hong Kong Film Awards for her film Rigor Mortis. In 2017, she won the Best Actress Award at the 36th Hong Kong film awards for Happiness. In March 2018, Wai won the Excellence In Asian Cinema Award at the 12th Asian Film Awards. In October 2018, she was awarded the Bronze Bauhinia Star for her outstanding achievements in the performing arts industry by the Chief Executive Carrie Lam. In 2018, Wai starred as the conservative wife of a closeted transgender woman in Tracey. The film earned Wai the Award for Best Supporting Actress at the 38th Hong Kong Film Awards and the Award for Best Supporting Actress at the 13th Asian Film Awards. In 2019, Wai earned critical acclaim with her role as Chief Superintendent Man Hei-wah (Madam Man) in the TVB crime drama The Defected, for which she won the Best Actress award at the 2019 TVB Anniversary Awards.

In 2021, Wai and Hugo Ng Doi-Yung starred in the movie "Sunshine of my life" as a blind parent of a normal child, played by Karena Ng. In the same year, she starred in the TVB crime thriller Murder Diary, in which she portrayed Yeung Bik-sum, a mental hospital assistant with schizophrenia, and was once again highly praised for her acting skills.

== Filmography ==
=== Film ===
==== 1970s ====
Year	Title	Role
1976	Challenge of the Masters	
1977	Chinatown Kid	Girl in brothel
1977	The Brave Archer	Mu Nianci
1977	Teenager's Nightmare: The Criminals Part 5	
1977	The Dream of the Red Chamber	Sheyue
1978	Invincible Shaolin	Xiu Yin
1978	Heaven Sword & Dragon Sabre Part II	
1978	The Voyage of Emperor Chien Lung	
1978	Swordsman and Enchantress	
1978	The Cunning Hustler	
1978	The Brave Archer 2	Mu Nianci
1978	Clan of Amazons	
1978	Shaolin Handlock	Li's student
1979	The Tigress of Shaolin	Tsai Chiao
1979	The Last Judgement	
1979	Life Gamble	Xiao Hung
1979	The Scandalous Warlord	Concubine
1979	Mad Monkey Kung Fu	Miss Chen
1979	The Deadly Breaking Sword	Xiaoqin
1979	The Ghost Story	
1979	Dirty Ho	Choi Hung

==== 1980s ====
Year	Title	Role
1980	Return to the 36th Chamber	Hung
1980	The Swift Sword	
1980	Emperor Chien Lung and the Beauty	
1980	Heaven and Hell	Lin Wei-Gang's Girlfriend
1980	Clan of the White Lotus	Mei-Hsiao
1981	Sword Stained with Royal Blood	
1981	Return of the Sentimental Swordsman	Sun Hsiao Hung
1981	My Young Auntie	Cheng Tai-Nan
1981	The Brave Archer 3	
1981	Martial Club	Chu Ying
1981	The Tiger and the Widow	
1981	The Duel of the Century	
1982	The Emperor and the Minister	
1982	Cat vs Rat	Chan's sister
1982	The Brave Archer and His Mate	
1982	Legendary Weapons of China	Fang Shao-Ching
1982	The 82 Tenants	
1982	Buddha's Palm	
1983	Demon of the Lute	
1983	The Lady Is the Boss	
1984	Three Stooges Go Undercover	
1984	New Tales of the Flying Fox	Yuan Tzu-yi
1984	The Eight Diagram Pole Fighter	Yang No.8
1984	Family Light Affair	
1984	Double Decker	
1984	The Return of Pom Pom	Yuen Hung/Mimi
1984	Long Road to Gallantry	Li Sai Nan
1985	Twinkle, Twinkle, Lucky Stars	Tour Girl
1985	Why Me?	Woman Whose Husband Gambles
1985	Journey of the Doomed	
1986	The Story of Dr. Sun Yat-sen	
1986	Rosa	Lei's Sister
1986	Naughty Boys	Chuan
1986	The Seventh Curse	Inspector Chiang
1987	Rouge	Actress Portraying Ghost
1988	Peacock King	
1988	The Inspector Wears Skirts	May
1988	Pretty Women at War	Ah Phoh
1988	The Dragon Family	Wai's wife
1989	Burning Ambition	Chau Siu-Hong
1989	They Came to Rob Hong Kong	Inspector Shang
1989	Red Lips	
1989	Widow Warriors	Sister-in-law
1989	The Inspector Wears Skirts II	

==== 1990s ====
Year	Title	Role
1990	Stage Door Johnny	
1990	Angel Terminators	Hon
1990	Raid on Royal Casino Marine	May
1990	Lethal Angels 2	
1991	The Banquet	The Servant
1991	Heart of Danger	
1991	Who Cares!	
1991	Queen of Gambler	
1991	The Roar of the Vietnamese	Yuen Wan-Yin
1992	The Inspector Wears Skirts IV	May
1992	Behind the Curtain	
1992	Guys in Ghost's Hand	
1992	Zen of Sword	Ha Hou's Aunt
1992	Mega Force from Highland	
1992	Legend of the Drunken Tiger	Leela
1993	Madam City Hunter	Siu-Hung
1993	Tattoo Girl	
1994	Sharpshooters	Kan Nam
1995	The Vengeance	
1996	Dragon from Shaolin	
1996	Xiu hua da dao	

==== 2000s ====
Year	Title	Role
2000	High K	
2000	Fist Power	
2001	Visible Secret	Siu Kam's mother
2003	The Park	Mrs. Yu
2003	Infernal Affairs II	Hau's sister
2003	The Secret Society – Boss	Fai's ex-wife
2003	Night Corridor	Sam's mother
2004	Blood Brothers	Wing's mother
2005	A Chinese Tall Story	
2005	Crazy N' the City	Rachel
2008	Legendary Assassin	Boss
2008	L for Love L for Lies	Bobo's mother
2009	At the End of Daybreak	Tuck's mother

==== 2010s ====
Year	Title	Role
2010	72 Tenants of Prosperity	
2010	Kung Fu Wing Chun	Master Ng Mui
2011	A Chinese Ghost Story	Lao Lao, the tree demon
2011	Dragon	Knife fighter
2011	The Wedding Diary	
2011	Turning Point 2	
2012	Diva	Sister Dan
2012	Happiness Me Too	
2013	Midnight Train	
2013	7 Assassins	
2013	The Wedding Diary 2	
2013	The Fox Lover	
2013	Rigor Mortis	Yeung Feng
2013	Control	
2014	Lock Me Up, Tie Him Down	
2014	The Midnight After	
2015	Lovers & Movies	
2015	Kungfu Taboo	
2015	Daughter	
2016	Book of Love	Ling
2016	Horrible Masion In Wild Village	Granny
2016	Happiness	Tse Yuen-fan
2016	The Warriors Gate	Mountain Spirit
2016	Mrs K	Mrs K
2017	77 Heartbreaks	Eva's mother
2017	The Mysterious Family	Mother
2017	The Bold, the Corrupt, and the Beautiful	Madame Tang
2018	Tracey	Anne
2018	House of the Rising Sons	
2018	A Life of Papers	
2018	Catching Crazy	
2019	77 Heartwarmings	
2019	Mr. Monster	
2019	My People, My Country	

==== 2020s ====
Year	Title	Role
2020	Monster Run	Lady Lotus
2021	77 Heartwarmings	Eva's Mother
2022	Sunshine of My Life	Gan Xiaohong
2023	Śakra (Demi-Gods and Semi-Devils)	Ruan Xingzhu
2023	Ciao	Zhang Qianying
2023	Love Never Ends	Li Huiru
2023	Last Suspect	Lin Shu'e

=== Television dramas ===
Year	English title	Original title	Role	Notes
1996	Journey to the West	西遊記	Flying Tiger General	
1997	Deadly Protection	保護證人組	Lee Dzi San	
1997	Lady Flower Fist	苗翠花	Ma Yuk Mui	
1999	At the Threshold of an Era	創世紀	Eva Lau Shuet Ling	
1999	A Smiling Ghost Story	衝上人間	Fong Yuet-Ping	
1999	Tai Ji Zong Shi	太極宗師	Aunt Hung	
2001	The Heaven Sword & the Dragon Sabre	倚天屠龍記	Miejue Shi Tai	
2006	Safe Guards	鐵血保鏢	Yan Ching	
2006	Below the Lion Rock	獅子山下	Herself	
2006	CRD Love Story	情定CRD		
2007	On the First Beat	學警出更	Wong Shuk Yin	
2007	ICAC Investigators 2007	廉政行動2007	Choi Yuet Ngo	
2007	Word Twisters' Adventures	鐵咀銀牙	Poon Bak Fung	
2008	Wasabi Mon Amour	和味濃情	Ko Kwai	
2008	Forensic Heroes II	法證先鋒II	Cheng Lai Ling	
2008	Legend of the Demigods	搜神傳	Cho Mong Yau	
2008	Pages of Treasures	Click入黃金屋	Fun	
2009	Man in Charge	幕後大老爺	Ching Tai Niang	
2009	Rosy Business	巾幗梟雄	Lau Fong	Nominated — TVB Anniversary Award for Best Supporting Actress
2009	Sweetness in the Salt	碧血鹽梟	Choi Ngan Fa	
2009	Beyond the Realm of Conscience	宮心計	Tam Yim Sheung	
2010	A Fistful of Stances	鐵馬尋橋	Cheung Sheung-chu	Nominated — TVB Anniversary Award for Best Supporting Actress
2010	Can't Buy Me Love	公主嫁到	Concubine Wei	
2010	No Regrets	巾幗梟雄之義海豪情	Yeung Ng Lai-sim	
2011	The Glamorous Imperial Concubine	傾世皇妃	Du Feihong (Empress Du)	
2013	Women of the Tang Dynasty	唐宮燕之女人天下	Wu Zetian	
2014	Legend of the Last Emperor	末代皇帝传奇	Yehenara Jingfen (Empress Dowager Longyu)	
2015	Incredible Mama	我阿媽係黑玫瑰	Chung-Sam Fat-yuen	
2015	Heroes of Sui and Tang Dynasties 5	隋唐英雄5	Wu Zetian	
2015	The Female Assassins in the Palace	金釵諜影	Mo Yun	
2015	The Legend of Xiao Zhuang	大玉兒傳奇	Lady Abahai	
2016	Affairs of the Heart	人間有情：苦瓜的味道	Jing	
2019	Stained	心冤	Fion Bo	
2019	The Defected	鐵探	Chief Superintendent Man Hei-wah (Madam Man)	Won — TVB Anniversary Award for Best Actress
2020	Imperfect Love	不完美的她	Yuan Ling	
2020	We Are All Alone	怪你过分美丽	Ruan Lihua	
2021	The Rebel Princess	上阳赋	Noble Consort Xie	
2021	Murder Diary	刑偵日記	Yeung Bik-sum	
TBA		啼笑书香		
TBA		当家主母		

== Awards and nominations ==
Year	Award	Category	Film / television dramas	Result
1982	1st Hong Kong Film Awards	Best Actress	My Young Auntie	Won
2002	21st Hong Kong Film Awards	Best Supporting Actress	Visible Secret	Nominated
2003	40th Golden Horse Awards	Best Supporting Actress	Night Corridor	Nominated
2009	43rd TVB Anniversary Awards	Best Supporting Actress	Rosy Business	Nominated
2009	46th Golden Horse Awards	Best Supporting Actress	At the End of Daybreak	Won
2010	16th Hong Kong Film Critics Society Awards	Best Actress	At the End of Daybreak	Won
2010	4th Asian Film Awards	Best Supporting Actress	At the End of Daybreak	Won
2010	29th Hong Kong Film Awards	Best Actress	At the End of Daybreak	Won
2010	10th Chinese Film Media Awards	Best Actress	At the End of Daybreak	Won
2010	10th Changchun Film Festival	Best Actress	At the End of Daybreak	Won
2010	Vladivostok International Film Festival	Best Actress	At the End of Daybreak	Won
2010	44th TVB Anniversary Awards	Best Supporting Actress	A Fistful of Stances	Nominated
2011	48th Golden Horse Awards	Best Supporting Actress	A Chinese Ghost Story	Nominated
2012	31st Hong Kong Film Awards	Best Supporting Actress	Wu Xia	Nominated
2013	1st Malaysia's Golden Wau Awards	Best Supporting Actress	The Wedding Diary	Won
2014	33rd Hong Kong Film Awards	Best Supporting Actress	Rigor Mortis	Won
2015	34th Hong Kong Film Awards	Best Supporting Actress	The Midnight After	Nominated
2017	11th Asian Film Awards	Best Actress	Happiness	Nominated
2017	36th Hong Kong Film Awards	Best Actress	Happiness	Won
2017	Macau International Movie Festival	Best Actress	Happiness	Won
2017	Chinese Film Media Awards	Best Actress	Happiness	Nominated
2017	24th Beijing College Student Film Festival	Best Actress	Happiness	Nominated
2017	54th Golden Horse Awards	Best Leading Actress	The Bold, the Corrupt, and the Beautiful	Won
2017	22nd Asian Television Awards	Best Actress in a Leading Role	Affairs of the Heart	Won
2018	12th Asian Film Awards	Excellence in Asian Cinema Awards		Won
2018	55th Golden Horse Awards	Best Supporting Actress	Tracey	Nominated
2019	38th Hong Kong Film Awards	Best Supporting Actress	Tracey	Won
2019	13th Asian Film Awards	Best Supporting Actress	Tracey	Won
2019	2nd Asian Academy Creative Awards	Best Leading Actress (Hong Kong)	The Defected	Won
2019	26th Huading Awards	Best Actress	The Defected	Won
2019	26th Huading Awards	Top Ten Favorite Actors	The Defected	Won
2019	TVB Anniversary Awards	Best Actress	The Defected	Won
2020	35th Hundred Flowers Awards	Best Actress	My People, My Country	Nominated
2021	TVB Anniversary Awards	Best Actress	Murder Diary	Top 10
2021	TVB Anniversary Awards	Most Popular Female Character	Murder Diary	Nominated
2021	TVB Anniversary Awards	Most Popular Onscreen Partnership (with Philip Keung)	Murder Diary	Nominated
2021	TVB Anniversary Awards	Favourite TVB Actress in Malaysia	Murder Diary	Nominated
2023	36th Golden Rooster Awards	Best Actress	Love Never Ends	Nominated
2024	15th China Film Director's Guild Awards	Best Actress	Love Never Ends	Nominated
2025	20th Huabiao Awards	Outstanding Actress	Love Never Ends	Won
