= Little Dragon Maiden =

1983 Hong Kong film by Hua Shan

- Theatrical poster
- 楊過與小龍女
- Directed by: Hua Shan
- Screenplay by: Tam Neng; Choi Naai-ban
- Based on: The Return of the Condor Heroes by Jin Yong
- Produced by: Mona Fong
- Starring: Leslie Cheung; Mary Jean Reimer
- Cinematography: Nico Wong
- Edited by: Chiang Hsing-lung; Henry Cheung
- Music by: Shing Chin-Yung; Su Chen-Hou
- Production company: Shaw Brothers Studio
- Release date: 2 December 1983
- Running time: 92 minutes
- Country: Hong Kong
- Language: Mandarin
- Box office: HK$1,619,384

Little Dragon Maiden (楊過與小龍女), also known as The Brave Archer 5, is a 1983 Hong Kong wuxia film adapted from the novel The Return of the Condor Heroes by Jin Yong. It serves as an unofficial sequel to The Brave Archer, The Brave Archer 2, The Brave Archer 3, and The Brave Archer and His Mate.

== Cast ==
- Leslie Cheung as Yang Guo / Yang Kang
- Mary Jean Reimer as Xiaolongnü
- Chen Kuan-tai as Guo Jing
- Leanne Liu as Huang Rong
- Tien Lie as Li Mochou
- Lung Tien-hsiang as Jinlun Fawang
- Ku Kuan-chung as Huodu
- Ku Feng as Hong Qigong
- Lo Lieh as Ouyang Feng
- Sun Chien as Qiu Qianren
- Hung San-nam as Yin Zhiping
- Wong Lik as Zhao Zhijing
- Lai Yin-san as Cheng Ying
- Chan Lau as Huang Yaoshi
- Eddy Ko as Daerba
- Steve Mak as Lu Qingdu
- Lam Chi-tai as Zhiguang
- Eric Chan as Wu Dunru
- Siao Yuk as Wu Xiuwen
- Yiu Man-kei as Nimoxing
- Choi Kwok-keung as Yinkexi
- Stephen Chan as Xiaoxiangzi
