= Heroes Shed No Tears =

Heroes Shed No Tears may refer to:

- Heroes Shed No Tears (1980 film), directed by Chu Yuan
- Heroes Shed No Tears (1986 film), directed by John Woo
