= Mary Jean Reimer =

Hong Kong actress (born 1964)

Yung Jing Jing
- 翁靜晶
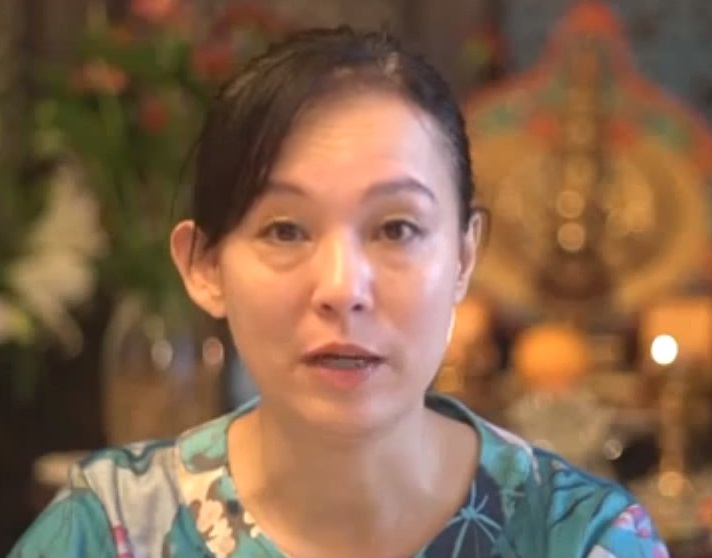
- Reimer in 2016
- Born: 22 May 1964 (age 62); South Vietnam
- Occupation: Actress
- Years active: 1980–1984
- Spouses: Lau Kar-leung (m. 1984; died 2013) Sean Eric Mclean Hotung (m. 2018)
- Children: Jeanne Lau (daughter); Rosemary Lau (daughter)

Chinese name
- Traditional Chinese: 翁靜晶
Transcriptions
Standard Mandarin
- Hanyu Pinyin: Wēng Jìngjīng
Yue: Cantonese
- Jyutping: Jung1 Zing6 Zing1

Mary Jean Reimer (Note: Legally she still keeps the last name of his deceased husband and her full name is Mary Jean Reimer Lau.) (born 22 May 1964), also known as Yung Jing Jing, is a Hong Kong solicitor and actress. She has American-Chinese-Vietnamese ancestry.

== Early life and film career ==
Reimer was born in South Vietnam (or the United States) to a Teochow Vietnamese father and Hoa mother. Her family moved to Hong Kong in 1965. She began her acting career with the TV series The Youth (年青人) and in 1980, she co-starred with Danny Chan in Clifford Choi's youth drama Encore (喝采). She reached her foremost fame with fantasy Wuxia films, among which is Little Dragon Maiden (楊過與小龍女) where she played the title character Xiaolongnü. Reimer ended her acting career after marriage to Lau Kar-leung in 1984. She has two daughters, Jeanne, born 1986, and Rosemary, born 1989, with him.

== Later career ==
Reimer started to work as an insurance consultant in 1989. She graduated from the University of Hong Kong School of Professional and Continuing Education in 1996 and began her career as a solicitor after her exam for her insurance agent qualifications has sections with regards to law, in which she scored 92 points. Reimer owned her business Reimer & Partners. In 2014, she retired after developing hypothyroidism from the physical and emotional stress from being a solicitor.

Reimer was also renowned as a TV and radio host and as a freelance writer with a newspaper column, Dangerous Persons.

Reimer is a practising Buddhist who used to sit on the board of Ting Wai Monastery. She exposed Sik Chi Ding, the abbess, for mishandling millions of Hong Kong dollars in donations and sham marriages with two monks for residency purposes. She has also been active in exposing the practice of fake monks begging in Hong Kong and foreign cities.

Reimer married her longtime boyfriend Sean Eric Mclean Hotung, who is a member of the Hotung family, in May 2018.
