= Life Gamble =

1979 Hong Kong film by Chang Cheh

- Film poster
- 生死鬥
- Directed by: Chang Cheh
- Written by: Chang Cheh; Ni Kuang
- Produced by: Run Run Shaw
- Starring: Philip Kwok; Alexander Fu; Wang Lung-wei; Ku Feng; Kara Hui; Chiang Sheng; Shirley Yu; Lu Feng; Lo Mang
- Cinematography: Kung Mu-To; Miyaki Yukio
- Edited by: Chiang Hsing-lung
- Music by: Chen Yung-Yu
- Production company: Shaw Brothers Studio
- Distributed by: Shaw Brothers Studio
- Release date: 22 February 1979
- Running time: 96 minutes
- Country: Hong Kong
- Language: Mandarin

Life Gamble (生死鬥), also known as Life Combat, is a 1979 Hong Kong wuxia film directed by Chang Cheh, starring the Venom Mob, Kara Hui and Alexander Fu. It was written by Chang Cheh and Ni Kuang, and produced by the Shaw Brothers Studio.

== Synopsis ==
Blacksmith Qiu Ziyu receives a blueprint from assassin Mo Junfeng, who requests that Qiu forge him a set of throwing knives. Qiu denies the request as he is no longer in the business of forging weapons. Mo becomes hostile and threatens Qiu's employees. Shortly afterwards, another assassin Xiaotang arrives, requesting that Qiu fix his carriage. Qiu agrees.

Xiaotang's partner Xiaoqian has a short conversation with Mo, telling him the story about how Qiu was betrayed by the swordsman Yan Zifei, whom he had forged a sword for. Qiu previously made weapons for martial artists in exchange for learning their skills. However, he retired after Yan tried to kill him upon receiving his new sword. Xiaoqian makes a deal with Mo that if he partners with her, she will get him the knives he needs.

Xiaoqiang and Mo get a room at an inn, coincidentally, in a room right next to a thief who had stolen Mo's knives. Xiaoqian tells Mo of four robbers she wants killed. The four have stolen the Harmony Jade from a private security company run by Master Nan. Initially, they planned to split what the jade is worth, but later decided to gamble for it in a game run by the gambling master Mao Kaiyuan. The robbers have no idea that Mao wants the jade for himself and has no intention of allowing any of them to win it. Mao enlists his housekeeper Peng Shuangshuang to help him, while his bodyguard Yun Xiang watches his back.

Xiaoqian and Xiaotang confront Yan, cut off his hand, and offer it to Qiu as payment for making Mo's knives, but Qiu still refuses. Later, a remorseful Yan finds Qiu's shop and asks Qiu if he still hates him. At this point, Master Nan's henchmen come to harass Qiu. Wu Hao, one of the robbers, shows up and drives away the henchmen after urging Qiu to return to forging weapons. Later, Nan, along with Qiu's friend Xiao Yanhong and her father Inspector Xiao Zijing, show up and convince Qiu to help them take back the jade.

Peng speaks with Mo, who is revealed to be her ex-lover, and offers to help him get back his knives back if he helps her. When she gets the knives, Xiaotang approaches and tells her to stay away from Mo, but she pretends to seduce Mo and kills him. Xiao arrives and agree not to arrest Peng for murder on the condition that she helps them spy on Mao and get back the jade. Yan hears of Xiaotang's death and begs Qiu to forgive him and make him an armoured hand so that he can contribute to society again.

Xiao goes undercover at Mao's gambling den and catches Yun's attention. Mo meets Mao and demands a cut of the profit from the jade. Yun overhears this and challenges Mo to a duel but Mao breaks up the fight. Mao then makes a deal with Mo which involves betraying and poisoning Xiaoqian.

For a second time, Mo approaches Qiu about making knives for him but Qiu refuses. Agitated at seeing an armored hand, Mo attacks him but Qiu counters and destroys half of his knives with the armored hand. Mo realises that he cannot defeat Qiu and offers to be his ally instead. Mao comes to Xiaoqian's room and makes a deal with her to betray Mo. When Mo returns to her, she finds the poison in his possession, as well as knives given to him by his "girlfriend". She attacks two of his pressure points, leaving him temporarily paralysed and bedridden. Qiu finds Mo incapacitated, revives him, and gives him three new knives to replace the ones destroyed. Then, he goes to offer Yan the armoured hand, but only under the condition that Yan helps him recover the jade.

The day arrives for the four robbers to meet Mao and gamble for the jade. Mao pays Peng what he promised her, but tells Yun to kill her anyway. Yun corners her in an alley, but spares her out of respect for Xiao, believing that they are close to each other. Once the game begins, the robbers place their bets and the first winner is killed. The three remaining robbers place their bets again for the jade, fully aware that any of them could be killed by one of their "friends". Mao rigs the gambling device to declare himself the winner. Once the melee begins, two of the three remaining robbers are killed when Xiaoqiang, Mo and Peng intervene.

Yun arrives and threatens Mo to protect his employer. He backs off when he sees Xiao and goes to protect her. Yun advises Mao to depart but Xiao orders him to tell Mao to put down the jade. Yun cannot bring himself to stop Mao. Qiu arrives with Yan as his enforcer. Once Yan kills the final robber, Qiu directs Xiao to instruct Yun not to intervene as he gambles with Mao for his life. Qiu counter-rigs the gambling piece so that Mao loses. Mao attacks Qiu but is killed by a dart from Yan's armoured hand. Qiu tells Yun to give the jade to Xiao but Yan refuses and threatens to kill Qiu. Mo attacks Yan with his knives but Yan catches them with his armoured hand. Mo throws one more knife, which splits into three that severely injure Yan. Yan tries to fire another dart but it backfires and kills him as Qiu had rigged the armoured hand to reset after firing a number of darts. Yun gives the jade to Xiao, but since she is taken hostage by Peng, who promises to leave once she gets the jade. Mo threatens both Xiao and Peng over the jade, forcing him and Yun into their inevitable rematch. This encounter also ends up being another draw until Yun throws a magnetic knife which catches Mo's knives, then kills him. Qiu tells Yun that Xiao is a police officer working undercover to retrieve the jade.

Peng acquires the jade and returns to the inn with Xiaohong, but the jade is pickpocketed from her on the stairs by the thief who stole Mo's knives. She is confronted by Inspector Xiao and Yun, and told to give up the jade. Qiu finds the thief and convinces him to give up the jade so he can return it to Master Nan. Inspector Xiao eventually finds the thief, who tells him that he gave the jade to Qiu. Inspector Xiao tells the thief to go and get Qiu since the owner of the jade reported the theft to the police and therefore, the inspector wants to return it to the owner directly. That evening, Peng is murdered by an assassin who is looking for the jade, forcing Inspector Xiao to go and get more men to find who he suspects is behind it.

Qiu goes to meet Nan but unknown to him, Nan is setting a trap for him. The thief eavesdrops on the conversations and warns Yun. Xiaohong surmises that Nan wants the jade for himself, since the jade is worth more than the insurance money he would get for it being stolen. Yun goes off to help Qiu. Qiu returns the jade to Nan and is attacked immediately by assassins dressed like the ones who killed Peng, and eventually, Nan himself. They overwhelm and kill Qiu before Yun can help him. Using his knives, and another hidden weapon, Yun avenges Qiu by killing Nan and his men, and then returns the jade to the police.

== Cast ==
- Alexander Fu as Yun Xiang
- Philip Kwok as Qiu Ziyu
- Wang Lung-wei as Mao Kaiyuan
- Ku Feng as Xiao Zijing
- Kara Hui as Xiao Yanhong
- Chiang Sheng as Xiaotang
- Shirley Yu as Peng Shuangshuang
- Lu Feng as Yan Zifei
- Lo Mang as Mo Junfeng
- Li Yi-min as Master Nan
- Lin Chen-chi as Xiaoqian
- Dick Wei as Jin Ba
- Sun Shu-pei as Cheng Changbo
- Tang Yen-tsan as Wu Hao
- Liu Hui-ling as Zhen Liuxiang
- Lin Hui-huang as Cui Miaoshou

== Reception ==
Reviewer Will of silveremulsion.com gave the film three out of four stars, writing, "As much as I enjoyed the beauty of that tension release, I imagine the action isn't going to be enough to sway the majority of fans into the positive on this one. It's good, but it's not legendary, and after that lengthy build-up it needed to be flawless and incredible to bring the film home. It was enough for me, but if it's not for you, I completely understand." The review concludes, "Life Gamble is sure to split the fans, but I enjoyed it (eventually). Some movies are easy to like, while others require patience and consideration. Life Gamble is the latter, and my feelings for it have grown more intense with the passage of time."

Reviewer Robert Welkner of coin-op.tv wrote, "The complex narrative wove through a web of characters and betrayals, showcasing an arsenal of hidden weapons and deceptive combat techniques rather than traditional hand-to-hand fighting." He also noted, "A standout sequence featured Philip Kwok in an impressive battle against spearmen and flag fighters. The film notably included Lu Feng sporting a metal hand – a distinctive feature that would later resurface in the classic 'Crippled Avengers'."

== Home media releases ==
As with House of Traps, Life Gamble was available as a Region 3 Celestial DVD reissue. Although it was difficult to purchase in other regional codings (except in degraded VHS tapes), the film is currently available on Region 1 DVD from Funimation. It has a new NTSC transfer and Mandarin/English language audio options with subtitles.
