= The Deadly Breaking Sword =

1979 Hong Kong film by Sun Chung

- Film poster
- 風流斷劍小小刀
- Directed by: Sun Chung
- Screenplay by: Ni Kuang
- Produced by: Run Run Shaw
- Starring: Ti Lung; Alexander Fu; Shih Szu; Ku Feng; Michael Chan; Lily Li
- Cinematography: Cho On-sun; Lam Ngai Kai
- Edited by: Chiang Hsing-lung; Yu Siu-fung
- Music by: Frankie Chan; Joseph Koo
- Production company: Shaw Brothers Studio
- Distributed by: Shaw Brothers Studio
- Release date: 12 April 1979
- Running time: 101 minutes
- Country: Hong Kong
- Language: Mandarin
- Box office: HK$2,716,494

The Deadly Breaking Sword (風流斷劍小小刀) is a 1979 Hong Kong wuxia film directed by Sun Chung, starring Ti Lung and Alexander Fu. In the film, a courtesan convinces a warrior to kill a crime lord for her. The warrior proceeds with breaking and entering into his target's household.

== Synopsis ==
Duan Changqing, a warrior, meets Liu Yinxu, a courtesan, in a small town. She pleads with him to help her avenge her brother by killing Guo Tiansheng, a notorious crime lord. Duan allies with Gao Men, a bouncer, to break into the Guo residence and eliminate the crime lord.

== Cast ==
- Ti Lung as Duan Changqing
- Alexander Fu as Gao Men
- Shih Szu as Liu Yinxu
- Ku Feng as Guo Tiansheng
- Michael Chan as Lian San
- Lily Li as Luo Jinhua
- Shum Lo as Boss Luo
- Chan Shen as Fan Fei
- Ngai Fei as Chen Yinggang
- Teresa Ha as Madam Li
- Kara Hui as Xiaoqin
- Yuen Bun and Austin Wai as Guishen Erjian

== Theme song ==
The theme song "True Colors of a Beautiful Hero" (美雄本色) was composed by Joseph Koo with the lyrics by Sun Yi, and sung by Jenny Tseng in Cantonese.

== Reception ==
=== Critical ===
Ian Jane of DVD Talk gave the film a positive review and writes "The film might seem a little dated considering that it came out in the mid-eighties, past the genre's prime by a bit of a margin, but it stands as a good example of how fun and exciting a well made Shaw Brothers swordplay could be when delivered by a dedicated director and a talented cast."

=== Box office ===
The film grossed HK$2,716,494 at the Hong Kong box office during its theatrical run from 12 to 26 April 1979 in Hong Kong.
