= Alexander Fu Sheng =

Hong Kong martial arts actor

- 傅聲
- Born: Cheung Fu-sheng (張富聲); 20 October 1954; Pok Fu Lam, Hong Kong Island, British Hong Kong
- Died: 7 July 1983 (aged 28); United Christian Hospital, Kwun Tong, British Hong Kong
- Burial place: Fung Ying Seen Koon, Fanling, Fanling–Sheung Shui New Town, Hong Kong
- Education: Shaw Brothers Southern Drama School
- Occupations: actor director
- Years active: 1972–1983
- Spouse: Jenny Tseng (m. 1976)
- Parent(s): Benton Cheung Yan-lung (father); Angela Liu Fung-wo (mother)
- Awards: Asia-Pacific Film Festival; Best Newcomer; 1974 Friends

Chinese name
- Traditional Chinese: 傅聲
- Simplified Chinese: 傅声
Transcriptions
Standard Mandarin
- Hanyu Pinyin: Fù Shēng
Yue: Cantonese
- Jyutping: Fu6 Sing1

Cheung Fu-sheng
- Traditional Chinese: 張富聲
- Simplified Chinese: 张富声
Transcriptions
Standard Mandarin
- Hanyu Pinyin: Zhāng Fùshēng

Alexander Fu Sheng (Chinese: 傅聲; born Cheung Fu-sheng 張富聲; 20 October 1954 – 7 July 1983), also known as Fu Sing, was a Hong Kong martial arts actor. One of Hong Kong's most talented performers, Fu rose to prominence in the 1970s starring in a string of movies with the Shaw Brothers that accrued him international stardom throughout Asia and parts of North America.

== Early life ==
Fu was born Cheung Fu-sheng in British Hong Kong on October 20, 1954. The ninth of eleven children, he was born into a wealthy family as his father, Benton Cheung Yan-lung, was a businessman and politician from the New Territories who had served as a member of the Legislative Council of Hong Kong. His mother, Angela Liu Fung-wo, was a devout Buddhist.

As a child, Fu developed a fondness for martial arts when he was 8 years old. He was often involved with street fights and his short temperament got him into fights with his teachers and classmates. He left school when he was 15 and became a construction worker for his uncle before applying to the Shaw Brothers Southern Drama School after seeing it in a newspaper advertisement. A judo and karate practitioner, he went on to learn dance, fashion, photography, and screenwriting at the academy. On September 28, 1972, he was amongst 45 graduates who were presented their certificates by Sir Run Run Shaw and Yu Ching Wai. Prior his graduation, he had had some acting experience, appearing primarily in background roles in films such as Cheung Kong's The 14 Amazons (1972) (his debut) and Chang Cheh's Young People (1972), and was shooting Police Force (1973) at the time of his graduation. His total earnings at this time were around HK $500 (USD $63).

== Career ==
Upon leaving Shaw's drama school, Fu signed a 3-5 year contract with the Shaw Brothers Studio and received a monthly salary of HK $650 (USD $83). In 1973, he was cast in Chang's youth action drama film Friends alongside David Chiang and Lily Li where his performance as the brash but honorable runaway Du Jiaji won him Best Newcomer at the 20th Asia-Pacific Film Festival in Taipei. Unlike his male contemporaries Jimmy Wang Yu, Ti Lung, David Chiang, and Chen Kuan-tai, Fu's characters were irreverent and boyish which, according to Chang, had not been seen before at the time and as a result, made them all the more memorable. He quickly became one of the director's favorite actors and protégés, going on to make 28 movies with him, many of which he starred in lead or major supporting roles. The actor later credited Chang as a mentor and father figure and the main reason for his successful film career. For several years, he would refuse roles and offers from other directors and film companies to work exclusively for Chang and Shaw's.

Following Chang's shift to the martial arts genre, Fu practiced hung gar kung fu with Lau Kar-leung, Chang's main action choreographer at the time. Later in 1973, Fu relocated to Taiwan under Chang's independent film company, Long Bow. His next film, Heroes Two, was met with critical and commercial success and Fu was lauded for his mischievous yet proud portrayal of Chinese folk hero Fong Sai-yuk, a role he would reprise in its sequels Men From The Monastery (1974), Shaolin Temple (1976), and The Shaolin Avengers (1976). His other martial art films, Five Shaolin Masters (1974) and Disciples of Shaolin (1975) (unrelated to the previous titles) were also commercial successes, the latter becoming Chang's biggest hit in Hong Kong. These Shaolin films also gained Fu some degree of international popularity in Japan. In between Chang's Shaolin films, Fu took part in his big budget 'cast of thousands' epics, Marco Polo (1975), The Boxer Rebellion (1975), and The Naval Commandos (1977).

In 1977, Chang returned to making wuxia films and Fu was once again cast as the lead role in four of the five Brave Archer movies, a multi-part series based on the 1957 novel and its sequel that similarly had a 'cast of thousands' production and was completed in a span of five years. That same year, Fu was cast in Chang's Chinatown Kid, a film that further garnered him international recognition, becoming a massive cult favorite in the United States. Shot in San Francisco's Chinatown, his performance as the migrant worker-turned-criminal Tan Tung was praised by one American critic as being the actor's most mature as well as most heartbreaking work.

Towards the late 70s, Fu collaborated with close friend Ti Lung in Sun Chung's The Avenging Eagle (1978) and The Deadly Breaking Sword (1979), once more to critical and commercial success. However, Fu suffered a series of injuries on set that temporarily impeded his career: on September 17, 1978 while filming The Deadly Breaking Sword, he fell eight feet and smashed head-first into an urn from which he suffered bouts of dizziness for several months, and on September 19 the following year, while filming an action sequence in Heroes Shed No Tears, a harness suspending him broke, causing him to fall and shatter his right leg. Fu's parents reportedly tried pressuring him to quit the film industry as a result of these injuries but were unsuccessful.

In 1981, he became a student under Lau Kar-leung and, after filming for the final Brave Archer movie wrapped, worked mainly under Lau and his brother, Lau Kar-wing, who cast Fu alongside his own brother David Cheung Chan Peng in his comedy films Treasure Hunters (1981) and The Fake Ghost Catchers (1982). Lau Kar-leung's 1982 wuxia film Legendary Weapons of China was Fu's highest-grossing film as well as one of his last completed projects.

== Personal life ==
Fu married Macau-born singer and frequent costar Jenny Tseng on December 4, 1976. Fu later became a topic of interest when rumor spread of him having purchased Bruce Lee's former residence in Hong Kong.

== Death ==
On July 6, 1983, Fu was seriously injured in an automobile accident after the vehicle he was in, a Porsche 911, swerved into a concrete pole, flipped, and crashed into a hillside. He had not been wearing a seat belt. An unconscious Fu was rushed to the United Christian Hospital where he received up to four pounds of blood transfusions, but died of his injuries at 3:43 a.m., aged 28 years old. A post mortem revealed the actor had died from chest injuries and shock. Reportedly, Fu had been racing with his brothers, David Cheung Chin Pang (his fellow actor) and Horatio Cheung Chun Sheng, and Wong Yue, a costar, although Fu had been a passenger as he had had his license suspended for reckless driving. The driver, his brother Horatio Cheung Chun Sheng, suffered serious head injuries in the accident and was found guilty of dangerous driving in a December hearing. However, the presiding judge, G.P. Muttrie, discharged him, arguing that "any driver who had been involved in an accident in which a close member of his family was killed was punishment enough".

Fu's funeral was held on July 14, 1983 and was organized by the Shaw Brothers committee. The South China Morning Post reported that 2,000 friends and relatives attended while some 3,000 fans gathered to pay their respects during the funeral procession in Hung Hom. His remains were cremated and interred at Fung Ying Seen Koon in Hong Kong. A stone cenotaph was later erected at the site of his crash by Sir Run Run Shaw. At the time of his death, Fu had been filming Lau Kar-leung's The Eight Diagram Pole Fighter in which he co-starred with Wong Yue and his brother and fellow actor David Cheung Chin pang. The script was rewritten with Fu's character abruptly disappearing halfway through as focus was redirected to his costar, Gordon Liu. Fu also replaced Lau Kar-wing as the co-director (in his directorial debut) of Wits of the Brats alongside Wong Jing. The film was posthumously released on May 24, 1984, and was a box office success.

== Legacy ==
Fu's rebellious and boyish persona was attributed by Chang as being the progenitor for the xiaozi (Mandarin colloquialism for 'kid' or 'brat') genre and was likened as a vanguard for Jackie Chan, Stephen Chow, and Andy Lau. Chang described Fu as "a brilliant actor...adept in both literary and action" and that he (Chang) "did not see a spark like that emitting from another actor at the Shaw Studios after he died." American film critic Ed Travis noted that although Fu never attained Bruce Lee's level of recognition, he had "qualities like Bruce Lee or James Dean in that his youthfulness will live on forever in film as new generations discover his work."

In 2012, Fu was inducted into the Martial Art History Museum's Museum Hall of Fame in Burbank, California for his historic and iconic impact on the martial arts community. A bronze bust of the actor was erected there the following year to mark the 30th anniversary of his death.

== Filmography ==
- The 14 Amazons (1972) - soldier (extra)
- Young People (1972) - drum player (extra)
- Four Riders a.k.a. Hellfighters of the East and Strike 4 Revenge (1972) - soldier at Jukebox (extra)
- Man of Iron a.k.a. Warrior of Steel (1972) - young man with a bicycle (extra)
- The Thunderbolt Fist (1972) - (extra)
- Generation Gap (1973) - Ah Qiang
- Police Force (1973) - Liang Kuan
- Heroes Two a.k.a. Kung Fu Invaders (1974) - Fong Sai-yuk
- Three Styles of Hung School's Kung Fu – A Demonstration Film of the Chinese Kung Fu (1974) - himself
- Na Cha The Great (1974) - Na Cha
- Men from the Monastery a.k.a. Disciples of Death and Dragon's Teeth (1974) - Fong Sai-yuk
- Friends (1974) - Du Jiaji
- Shaolin Martial Arts a.k.a. Five Fingers of Death (1974) - Li Yao
- 5 Shaolin Masters a.k.a. The 5 Masters of Death (1974) - Ma Chao-Hsing
- Disciples of Shaolin a.k.a. The Invincible One (1975) - Guan Feng Yi
- Marco Polo a.k.a. The Four Assassins (1975) - Li Xiongfeng
- Boxer Rebellion a.k.a. The Bloody Avengers (1976) - Tsang Hin Hon
- 7-Man Army (1976) - Private He Hong Fa
- The Shaolin Avengers a.k.a. Invincible Kung Fu Brothers (1976) - Fong Sai-yuk
- New Shaolin Boxers a.k.a. Demon Fists of Kung Fu (1976) - Zhong Jian
- Shaolin Temple a.k.a. Death Chamber (1976) - Fong Sai-yuk
- The Naval Commandos (1977) - Xiao Liu
- Magnificent Wanderers a.k.a. Magnificent Kung Fu Warriors (1977) - Lin Shao You
- The Brave Archer a.k.a. Kung Fu Warlords (1977) - Kuo Tsing
- The Chinatown Kid (1977) - Tang Tong
- The Brave Archer 2 a.k.a. Kung Fu Warlords Part II (1978) - Kuo Tsing
- Avenging Eagle (1978) - Double Sword Sleeve Cheuk Yi Fan
- Life Gamble (1979) - Yun Xiang
- The Proud Twins (1979) - Jiang Xiaoyu (Xiaoyu'er)
- The Deadly Breaking Sword (1979) - Xiao Dao
- Heroes Shed No Tears (1980) - Kao Chien Fei
- Heaven and Hell a.k.a. Shaolin Hellgate (1980) - Chen Ding
- Ten Tigers from Kwangtung (1980) - Tam Ming
- Return of the Sentimental Swordsman (1981) - Jing Wuming
- The Brave Archer 3 a.k.a. Blast of the Iron Palm (1982) - Kuo Tsing
- Legendary Weapons of China a.k.a. Legendary Weapons of Kung Fu (1982) - Mo
- The Brave Archer and His Mate a.k.a. Mysterious Island (1982) - Yang Kuo
- The Fake Ghost Catchers (1982) - Wu Shunchao
- Cat vs Rat (1982), the Rat Bai Yu Tong
- My Rebellious Son a.k.a. Raging Tiger (1982) - Chang Siu Tai
- Treasure Hunters a.k.a. Master of Disaster (1982) - Chi Ta Po
- Hong Kong Playboys (1983) - Yan Quan Sheng
- Eight-Diagram Pole Fighter a.k.a. The Invincible Pole Fighters (1983) - 6th Yang (final film role)
- Wits of the Brats (1984) - Che Zai (released posthumously; also director)
