= Wits of the Brats =

1984 Hong Kong film by Wong Jing and Alexander Fu Sheng

- Film poster
- Traditional Chinese: 南斗官三鬥北少爺
- Simplified Chinese: 南斗官三斗北少爷
- Jyutping: Naam^{4} Dau^{2} Gwun^{1} Saam^{3} Dau^{3} Bak^{1} Siu^{3} Je^{4}
- Directed by: Alexander Fu Sheng; Wong Jing; Lau Kar-wing (uncredited)
- Screenplay by: Wong Jing
- Produced by: Run Run Shaw
- Starring: David Cheung Chin-pang; Alexander Fu Sheng; Natalis Chan; Wong Yue
- Cinematography: Lee San-yip
- Edited by: Lau Shiu-Gwong; Henry Cheung Siu-Hei; Chan Gan-Shing
- Music by: So Jan-Hau; Stephen Shing Gam-Wing
- Distributed by: Shaw Brothers
- Release date: 24 May 1984 (Hong Kong)
- Running time: 93 minutes
- Country: Hong Kong
- Languages: Cantonese; Mandarin; English

Wits of the Brats (Chinese: 南斗官三鬥北少爺, or simply 南斗官北少爺) is a 1984 Hong Kong action comedy film directed by Wong Jing and Alexander Fu Sheng in his directorial debut, who also stars in the movie. A martial arts movie, it is the only film that Alexander Fu Sheng ever directed as well as his second posthumous movie release.

== Plot ==
Tou Kuan is a rich spoiled son of a wealthy woman from Guandong, in 19-century southern China. He often outsmarts his opponents and is always accompanied by his advisor and best friend Mai Song. One day, while bullying his teacher, his greedy uncle Shih Chun notices the commotion. He tries to convince his sister that her son is not worthy of inheriting her wealth but ultimately fails when Tou Kuan and his friend and servant Mai Song quickly clean up the mess, threaten his teacher and pretend to be studying, which impress his mom. Mai Song later challenges the martial arts master and his student to a fight, but Tou Kuan easily defeats them and is bored because he wanted a much harder challenge.

Tou Kuan later meets a mahjong player nicknamed "Mr Blinker", whom Tou Kuan had previously defeated numerous times in the game. Despite "Mr Blinker" bringing another mahjong expert and attempting to cheat, Tou Kuan manages to outsmart them all and force "Mr Blinker" to swallow mahjong blocks. Tou Kuan and Mai Song later run away after mistakenly punching "Mr Blinker"'s father, a local official. In the meantime, in an attempt to get rid of his nephew to inherit Tou Kuan's mother's wealth, Shih Chun meets a Taoist assassin nicknamed "3 Eyes" (named for his eye tattoo on his forehead). Shih Chun reluctantly agrees to split Tou Kuan's wealth in half as a payment after the assassin threatens to kill him. Their discussion is interrupted by a brief but vicious fight in which a constable disguised as a customer attempts to arrest the assassin and is killed, showing the assassin's prowess. "3 Eyes" says that Shih Chun's nephew must leave Guandong and that he doesn't want to be directly involved in the assassination attempt, so he will send another assassin to murder Tou Kuan while on a journey.

Shih Chun later convinces Tou Kuan's mother to tell her son to travel outside to search for a wife. Although he initially refuses, Mai Song later convinces Tou Kuan to travel northward to Beijing to take on the "Three Northern Witty Young Masters" in order to improve Tou Kuan's status as a "Young Master".

Before stepping on a passenger ship, Mai Song assures Tou Kuan that he will have "entertainment" while on the ship. A henchman of "3 Eyes" later attempts to kill Tou Kuan, but Tou Kuan manages to avoid the assassin. A tough man paid by Mai Song to fight Tou Kuan later beats and throws the assassin off the ship after mistaking the assassin for Tou Kuan.

Arriving in the north, the two men take a break in a straw field. Tou Kuan later defecates and encountered another bandits/assassin who he mistook for another thugs paid by Mai Song to challenge Tou Kuan.

They manage to find one of the northern "Young Masters" named Che Zai, who is actually con artist, in a restaurant. Che Zai has massive wealth including collections of western luxurious good and a flintlock pistol that Tou Kuan purchases. The two men go to an imperial guard recruitment near the Forbidden City. There they are fooled by a court employee, apparently paid Che Zai to bring the two "volunteers" to a "shortcut" to the imperial guard recruitment which turns out to be a surgery room for castrate volunteers to become court eunuchs. Barely escaping, Tou Kuan is given a yellow magua vest as a gift by Che Zai for supposed immunity from the law, though it is actually fake. They again barely escape the police after Mai Song fires a shot from the purchased pistol.

They later encounter another "Young Master", Ren Zhen-hao, a womanizer with a Western appearance in a snooker club. Zhen-hao challenges Tou Kuan to flirt with a woman dressed in red. Tou Kuan and Mai Song attempt to fake an assault to have the gain feelings for Tou Kuan, but this fails when the woman turns out to be an expert fighter and defeats Tou Kuan. Zhen-hao takes the opportunity to fake and injury and gain the woman's sympathy.

Zhen-hao again challenge Tou Kuan, this time a daughter of a Russian ambassador. Tou Kuan and Mai Song later infiltrate the Russian consulate by pretending to be a wax statue and a consulate employee respectively. Zhen-hao meanwhile attempts to fake suicidal emotion using a realistic-looking suicide instrument to woo the Russian woman, almost getting himself killed because the disguised Tou Kuan has swapped the fake suicide instrument with its real counterpart. The Russian woman quickly rejects Zhen-hao after discovering his fake act. Tou Kuan is almost caught after he blows his cover to approach the Russian woman, but is later spared after the Russian woman's aunt intervenes. The aunt is also in love with Mai Song and has a much greater influence than her niece's ambassador father.

Zhen-hao admits defeat and brings the two men to meet the last of the three northern "Young Masters", a master thief nicknamed "3 Hands". Upon arriving at the thief's home, an English-speaking elderly maid named Mary warns them not to meet "3 Hands" or they'll regret it. The three men ignore her and meet the thief regardless. "3 Hands", notorious for pickpocketing and stealing, is avoided by everyone around him and has himself restrained by tying his own hands. Despite being restrained, he still manages to steal Tou Kuan's money sack using his feet. Impressed by the thief's abilities, Tou Kuan challenges him to steal his valuable jade locket before sunrise in the Russian consulate. He, Mai Song and Zhen-hao later ran away after noticing their pants being stolen by "3 Hands".

In the night, while "3 Hands" is infiltrating the consulate, another henchman of "3 Eyes" named "4 Eyes" because of his eyeglasses also infiltrates the compound to assassinate Tou Kuan. Tou Kuan, Zhen-hao and "3 Hands" later fight "4 Eyes" but struggle due to "4 Eyes" being invulnerable to melee weapons and punches. They manage to destroy his eyeglasses, rendering him unable to fight due to his farsightedness. Mai Song then shoots him in the leg with his revolver, despite his supposed invulnerability. They later interrogate "4 Eyes", who initially refuses to tell him the names of the people who want Tou Kuan dead but later tells everything after being threatened with Russian roulette. Continuing the bet, "3 Hands" has his maid imitate a rooster crowing at sunrise to expose the true location of the jade and wins the bet, with the locket in the hand of the master thief after he tells Tou Kuan of his trick before the actual sunrise occurs.

"3 Eyes", after evading arrest, later comes to the consulate to kill Tou Kuan himself. Meanwhile, Tou Kuan, disappointed at not having a wife while Mai Song already has one, finds a message seemingly from the Russian woman. Believing that she is wooing him, he traces the clothes to a torture room and is ambushed by the assassin. Mai Song and the other two "Young Masters" later arrived at the room, thinking Tou Kuan is having fun with the Russian woman, until they enter and engage in a fight against the assassin. After a long battle, "3 Eyes" is finally defeated when the assassin is incapacitated on a spike torture device and killed by the combined weight of the four men with Zhen-hao wearing heavy knight armor. After hearing the voice of the Russian woman inside a jail room, Tou Kuan goes inside to be intimate with her. Mai Song and "3 Hands" want to see the action, but Zhen-hao loses interest and the other men help him take off his armor instead.

In the final scene, Tou Kuan and Mai Song bring their Russian wives in traditional Chinese attires to their hometown of Guandong to meet Tou Kuan's mom, but are instead startled by the appearance of Tou Kuan's mom in Western clothing.

== Cast ==
- David Cheung Chin-pang as Tou Kuan
- Alexander Fu Sheng as Che Zai
- Lin Hui-huang as Mai Song
- Natalis Chan as Ren Zhen-hao
- Wong Yue as "3 Hands"
- Wang Lung-wei as "3 Eyes"
- Wong Jing as "Mr Blinker"
- Chan Shen as Shek Chun
- Lee Hoi-sang as "4 Eyes"

== Production ==
Wits of the Brats was originally set to be produced by Shaw Brothers Studio and directed by Lau Kar-wing, but Lau had a falling out with the studio and left the project in October 1982, prompting lead actor Alexander Fu Sheng to substitute as director. The film marks Fu Sheng's directorial debut after 11 years of acting. David Cheung Chin-pang, Fu's younger brother, was cast as the lead in the early stages after Fu took over the project. Fu died in a car accident in July 1983, leaving the film unfinished, along with two other Shaw Brothers Studio projects. Following his death, Fu's friend and fellow director Wong Jing stepped in as director, citing their friendship as his motivation to take over the project. Since Wong was primarily known for directing comedy rather than martial arts films, he rewrote the screenplay to include more comedic elements and invited Wong Yue and Natalis Chan to join the main cast alongside Cheung. Due to Fu's passing, his scenes accounted for less than half of the film, and he was directly written out of the story. Actor Chan Shen also passed away before the film's release. The film was theatrically released on 25 May 1984 in Hong Kong, and the Kung Sheung Evening News described the audience response as positive.

== Reception ==
The film "reveals a tart parodic wit and a flair for humorous staging", according to Gary Bettinson in the Directory of World Cinema.

YesAsia judged that the film was "both a non-stop fighting farce and a special event."

The review website onderhond.com gave the film a rating of 2.5 out of 5 starts, writing, "Jing Wong learned the tricks of the trade under the watching eye of the Shaw Brothers. Wits of the Brats is a pretty typical Shaw Bros production, at the same time it's interesting to see how Wong starts to introduce his own touches, both in front of the camera and from his comfy director's chair. The plot about a trickster who likes to make a fool of others is something Wong would recycle (quite a lot) in his later work, only this time it's done in a more Shaw Bros-appropriate setting. It's a rather strange mix of two worlds colliding, an intermediary film that helps connect two distinct eras of Hong Kong cinema. Performances are decent, there are some decent martial arts scenes and people who know Jing Wong might have some additional fun connecting the dots with his later work. The Shaw Bros' monotony is quite present though and it holds the film back a little. It's no surprise the studio would implode soon after. Decent filler."

Reviewer Hapa Hero wrote, "Wits of the Brats is a very special film for Fu Sheng. It was the first movie that he had directed and it was also the last movie that he had appeared in (Eight Diagram was released about three months earlier). With such a seemingly important position in Fu Sheng’s filmography, you might expect something remarkable. But still, the fact that you probably haven’t even heard of this movie should be a bad sign." The review concludes, "The sometimes annoying, but mostly funny comedy and the action only partially make up for the flaws in this movie. Since this is a Shaw Brothers movie and since it features one of my favorite actors, I almost feel bad that I don’t really like this movie. It’s simply entertaining, but nothing great. If you’re simply looking for a funny, but totally unimportant action comedy, I guess it could be recommended. But if you’re looking for a Shaw Brothers classic, a Fu Sheng film, or even a movie that isn’t a waste of time, then this is definitely and unfortunately a movie to skip."
