= Five Elements Ninjas =

1982 Hong Kong film by Chang Cheh

- Film poster
- Directed by: Chang Cheh
- Screenplay by: Chang Cheh; Ni Kuang
- Produced by: Mona Fong
- Starring: Cheng Tien Chi; Lo Mang; Lung Tung-Sheng; Wang Li; Michael Chan; Yu Tai Pei
- Cinematography: Huang Wenyun
- Edited by: Chiang Hsing-Lung; Lee Yim-Hoi
- Music by: Shing Chin Yung; Su Chen-Hou
- Production company: Shaw Brothers Studio
- Release date: 21 April 1982 (Hong Kong)
- Running time: 108 minutes
- Country: Hong Kong
- Languages: Cantonese; Mandarin; Japanese

Five Elements Ninjas (Chinese: 五遁忍術) is a 1982 Hong Kong martial arts film directed by Chang Cheh. The film is about a Chinese martial arts school that finds itself outclassed by their rivals, so they hire an elite ninja from Japan to destroy the school. The lone survivor of the massacre learns the secrets of ninjutsu and seeks revenge against the ninja. Although only starring one member of the famed Venom Mob in Lo Mang, the film very much is in the spirit of director Cheh's later Venom Mob films.

== Plot ==
In ancient China, during around the Yuan Dynasty, Chief Hong challenges his rival, Yuan Zeng, for the title of martial arts master. Their students face off against each other, and when his students are easily defeated, Hong calls in a samurai to fight on his behalf. Zeng's students are initially dismissive of a Japanese martial artist, but he defeats his opponent, whom he goads into committing suicide. Zeng's student Liang Zhi Sheng defeats the samurai, but before the samurai commits suicide, he warns that an allied ninja clan will seek revenge for his death. He tosses his ring at Zeng, who is poisoned when he catches it.

As Zeng recuperates, he receives a challenge from the Five-Element Ninjas. Suspecting a trap, he keeps two of his best students, Sheng and Tian Hao, at the school to guard it against an invasion and sends ten others to do battle. As Sheng and Hao help to reinforce the school's defenses and set traps, the ninjas use trickery and guerrilla warfare to defeat their opponents. Hong is overjoyed, but the leader of the ninja, Cheng Yun Mudou, advises that they push their advantage to destroy Zeng's school. Hong agrees, and Mudou sends a female spy, Senji, to infiltrate the school. Sheng convinces a reluctant Hao to take her in after they save her from being beaten.

Senji secretly makes a map as she takes various jobs around the school. Distrustful of her, Hao accuses her of hiding his weapon when she cleans his bedroom and demands to taste-test the soup that she has poisoned before letting her serve it to Zeng; to maintain her cover, she intentionally drops it. Once Senji completes her map, she smuggles it to Mudou. That night, Senji offers herself to Sheng, who refuses to take advantage of her, though he agrees that she may play a song for him on her flute. Under the cover of her flute-playing, Mudou's ninja attack the camp, killing many of the students before they are aware of the assault. Senji reveals herself as a spy and mortally wounds Sheng before he can rush to Hao's aid. Mudou kills Sheng and Zeng; Hao, who Senji requests they take prisoner, is the only survivor.

Remembering basic ninja training that he received in the past, Hao escapes from his bonds and takes Senji hostage when she comes to tell him that she has fallen in love with him. Hao escapes the ninja and returns to his old ninja master to complete his training. He joins three other students, who help him in his quest for revenge. Meanwhile, Mudou kills Hong and takes his place as martial arts master. Hao delivers a challenge to Mudou, who sends Senji to spy on Hao and report who his new master is; he also sends four ninjas to spy on Senji herself. Hao easily detects her, but when he also sees the ninjas, he accuses Senji of trying to trap him and kills her. After killing the ninjas, Hao and his fellow martial arts students proceed to fight each of the Five-Element Ninjas.

Now well-trained in ninjutsu and aware of the ninjas' trickery, Hao and his fellow martial arts students easily defeat the Japanese ninjas and destroy their symbols. Mudou, however, proves to be a difficult foe. As the four Chinese ninjas face off against him, he sneaks leg shackles onto Hao. Hao uses a mysterious key his master gave to him to unlock them, and makes many unsuccessful attempts to put them on Mudou. Finally, channeling his rage over the deaths of Senji, Sheng, and Zeng, he shackles Mudou's legs and pulls him down and while his 3 fellow martial arts students spear him, Hao tears Mudou in half. Hao himself is mortally wounded in the process. As his fellow martial arts students enquire as to why he put himself in front of Muduo's spiked feet, he dies. His brothers destroy the final symbol.

== Cast ==
- Cheng Tien Chi as Tian Hao
- Lo Mang as Liang Zhi Sheng
- Michael Chan as Cheng Yun Mudou (Kenbuchi Mudou)
- Chen Pei-Hsi as Senji
- Chan Shen as Chief Hong
- Kwan Fung as Yuan Zeng

== Release ==
Five Element Ninjas was released in Hong Kong on April 21, 1982.

== Reception ==
From retrospective reviews, AllMovie described the film as "a legend amongst fans of Asian cult fare and for once, the legend lives up to the hype." The review noted that the plot sticks to simple martial arts tropes, while noting that the "actual methods used are so off the wall that no fan will care" and that "the final twenty minutes is the kind of high-kicking bloodbath that is guaranteed to leave any fan of these films smiling and slackjawed. Thus, Five Element Ninjas is the kind of gloriously over-the-top blowout that every genre fan needs to see." Michael Brooke (Sight & Sound) wrote that the films that contain the word "ninja" in the title are generally "bargain-basement dreck" but that Five Element Ninjas was "a blissfully entertaining exception". The review noted that Five Element Ninjas "lacks the emotional intensity of Chang's earlier films", but stated that "its delirious verve and invention more than compensate. The body count is enormous even by Chang's notoriously gore-drenched standards, though the cartoonishly unrealistic blood-spurts and a disembowelled fighter meeting his doom after slipping on his own dangling entrails smacks more of a Monty Python Peckinpah tribute than anything especially disturbing." James Mudge of Beyond Hollywood wrote that "it has pretty much everything that discerning fans could ever want".
