= At the End of Daybreak =

2009 Malaysian-Hong Kong film by Ho Yuhang

- 心魔
- Directed by: Ho Yuhang
- Written by: Ho Yuhang
- Produced by: Chu Chen-on; Michelle Lo Yen-San; Lorna Tee
- Starring: Kara Hui; Chui Tien-you; Yasmin Ahmad
- Cinematography: Teoh Gay Hian
- Edited by: Mindy Wong
- Music by: Pete Teo
- Production companies: M&FC; October Pictures; Paperheart
- Distributed by: Golden Scene
- Release date: 5 November 2009 (Hong Kong)
- Running time: 94 minutes
- Countries: Malaysia; Hong Kong; South Korea

At the End of Daybreak (Sum Moh) (Chinese: 心魔) is a 2009 crime drama film directed and written by Ho Yuhang and has runtime of 94 minutes. A Malaysian-Hong Kong co-production, the film had its world premiere in August 2009 at the 62nd Locarno International Film Festival where it won NETPAC Award.

== Plot ==
Tuck (Chui Tien-you) is a 23-year-old Malaysian from a lower-class family, who lives with his divorced mother (Kara Hui) and generally lays about doing nothing. He dates Ying (Ng Meng-Hui), a 15-year-old schoolgirl whose quiet defiance defines her character.

== Cast ==
- Kara Hui
- Chui Tien-you
- Yasmin Ahmad
- Azman Hassan
- Hassan Muthalib
- Meng Hui Ng

== Awards ==
- 46th Golden Horse Awards - Kara Hui - Best supporting actress
- 16th Hong Kong Film Critics Society Awards - Kara Hui - Best actress
- 4th Asian Film Awards - Kara Hui - Best actress
- Best Newcomer - Jane Ng Meng Hui
- 29th Hong Kong Film Awards - Kara Hui - Best actress
- 10th Chinese Film Media Awards - Kara Hui - Best actress
- 10th Changchun Film Festival- Kara Hui - Best actress
- Vladivostok International Film Festival - Kara Hui - Best actress
- 2009 Locarno International Film Festival - NETPAC Award

== Festival ==
- 2009 (62nd) Locarno International Film Festival - 5–15 August - International Competition
- 2009 (34th) Toronto International Film Festival - 10–19 September - Contemporary World Cinema
- 2009 (28th) Vancouver International Film Festival - 1–16 October - Dragons and Tigers
- 2009 (14th) Busan International Film Festival - 8–16 October - A Window on Asian Cinema
- 2009 (6th) Hong Kong Asian Film Festival - 15–30 October - Closing Film
- 2009 (22nd) Tokyo International Film Festival - 17–25 October - Winds of Asia - Middle East
- 2010 (39th) International Film Festival Rotterdam - 27 January – 7 February
- 2010 (9th) Asian Film Festival of Dallas - 23–29 July 2010 *Southwest Premiere
