= Young People (1972 film) =

1972 Hong Kong film by Chang Cheh

- Film poster

Chinese name
- Traditional Chinese: 年輕人
- Simplified Chinese: 年轻人
Transcriptions
Standard Mandarin
- Hanyu Pinyin: Nián Qīng Rén
Yue: Cantonese
- Jyutping: Nin4 Hing1 Jan4
- Directed by: Chang Cheh
- Screenplay by: Ni Kuang; Chang Cheh
- Produced by: Run Run Shaw
- Starring: David Chiang; Ti Lung; Chen Kuan-tai; Irene Chan; Agnes Chan
- Cinematography: Kung Mu-to
- Edited by: Kwok Ting-hung
- Music by: Frankie Chan
- Production company: Shaw Brothers Studio
- Distributed by: Shaw Brothers Studio
- Release date: 7 July 1972
- Running time: 118 minutes
- Country: Hong Kong
- Language: Mandarin
- Box office: HK$1,223,950

Young People is a 1972 Hong Kong coming-of-age action drama film directed by Chang Cheh and starring David Chiang, Ti Lung, Chen Kuan-tai, Irene Chan and pop singer Agnes Chan, the younger sister of Irene Chan, in her debut film role.

== Plot ==
Martial arts club member Ho Tai's (Chen Kuan-tai) girlfriend Princess (Irene Chan) is the school babe, who also attracts the pursuit by star athlete Lam Tat (Ti Lung). Lam always ridicules Ho and they develop a bad relation. On the other hand, music club leader Hung Wai (David Chiang), who came from a family of martial arts, teaches martial arts to his club members to raise their spirits. Because of Princess, Lam got into a fight with Ho during jogging practice and Hung came to break up the fight. The two finally buried their hatchet. During the school's cart racing competition, Lam and Ho, out of gratitude for Hung, helped him win the championship.

== Cast ==
- David Chiang as Hung Wai
- Ti Lung as Lam Tat
- Chen Kuan-tai as Ho Tai
- Irene Chan as Princess
- Agnes Chan as Po Erh
- Wu Ma as Gao
- Chin Feng as Hung Wai's brother
- Lo Dik as Basketball coach Wong
- Wong Chung as Basketball player
- Tang Tak-cheung as Basketball player
- Danny Chow as Basketball player
- Bolo Yeung as Basketball player
- Wang Kuang-yu as Basketball player
- Bruce Tong as Basketball player
- Yeung Chak-lam as Basketball player
- Wu Chi-chin as Basketball player
- Lei Lung as Basketball player
- Fan Mei-sheng as Basketball player
- Ho Hon-chau
- Wong Ching as Cheung Wai Shing
- Sze-ma Wah-lung as TV reporter
- Wong Pau-gei as Wong Pui
- Lau Kar-wing as Johnny Lau
- Lee Yung-git as Martial arts student
- Tino Wong as Martial arts student
- Law Keung as Martial arts student
- Lau Jun-fai as Martial arts student
- Wong Shu-tong as Martial arts student
- Lau Gong as Martial arts student
- Law Lok-lam as Music group member
- Benz Hui as Music group member
- Chui Fat as Music group member
- Kwan Chung as Music group member
- Law Wai-chiu as Music group member
- Lee Chiu as Basketball referee
- Lo Wai as Kung Fu referee
- Wong Mei as Kung Fu referee
- Huang Ha as Tournament fighter
- Max Lee as Tournament fighter
- Yeung Pak-chan as Tournament audience
- Yen Shi-kwan as Ho Tai's ring assistant
- Ko Hung as Ho Tai's ring assistant
- Hsu Hsia as Wai Shing's ring assistant
- Chin Chun as VIP at basketball match
- Ting Tung as Cinematographer at cart race
- Wai Kong-sing
- Cheung Wing-kai
- Lee Wai-hoi
- Alexander Fu Sheng as Drum player
- Fung Hak-on
- Alan Chan
- To Wai-leung
- Chan Siu-gai
- Paul Tarrant as kart racer
- Arthur Tarrant as kart mechanic extra
- Mark Tarrant as kart race audience extra

== Box office ==
The film grossed HK$1,223,950 at the Hong Kong box office during its theatrical run from 7 to 19 July 1972 in Hong Kong.
