= Agnes Chan =

Hong Kong-born singer and activist

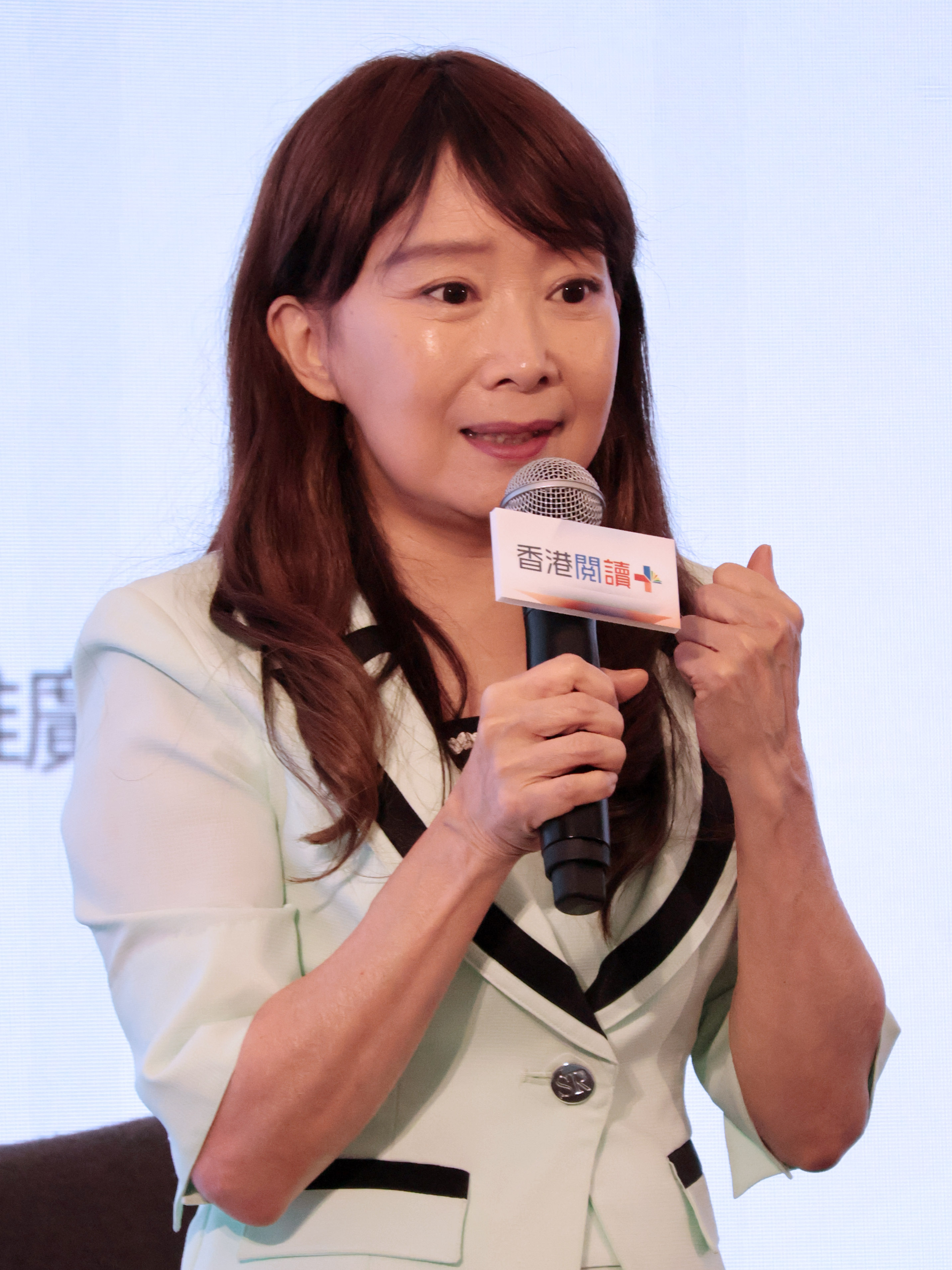
- Chan in 2024
- Born: 20 August 1955 (age 71); Sai Ying Pun, British Hong Kong
- Citizenship: British National (Overseas)
- Education: University of Toronto (BA); Stanford University (PhD)
- Occupations: Singer; writer; actress
- Years active: 1969–present

Chinese name
- Traditional Chinese: 陳美齡
- Simplified Chinese: 陈美龄
Transcriptions
Standard Mandarin
- Hanyu Pinyin: chén měi líng
Yue: Cantonese
- Jyutping: can4 mei5 ling4
- Musical career
- Also known as: アグネス・チャン
- Genres: Cantopop, Kayōkyoku, Hong Kong English pop
- Instruments: Vocals, Guitar

Signature
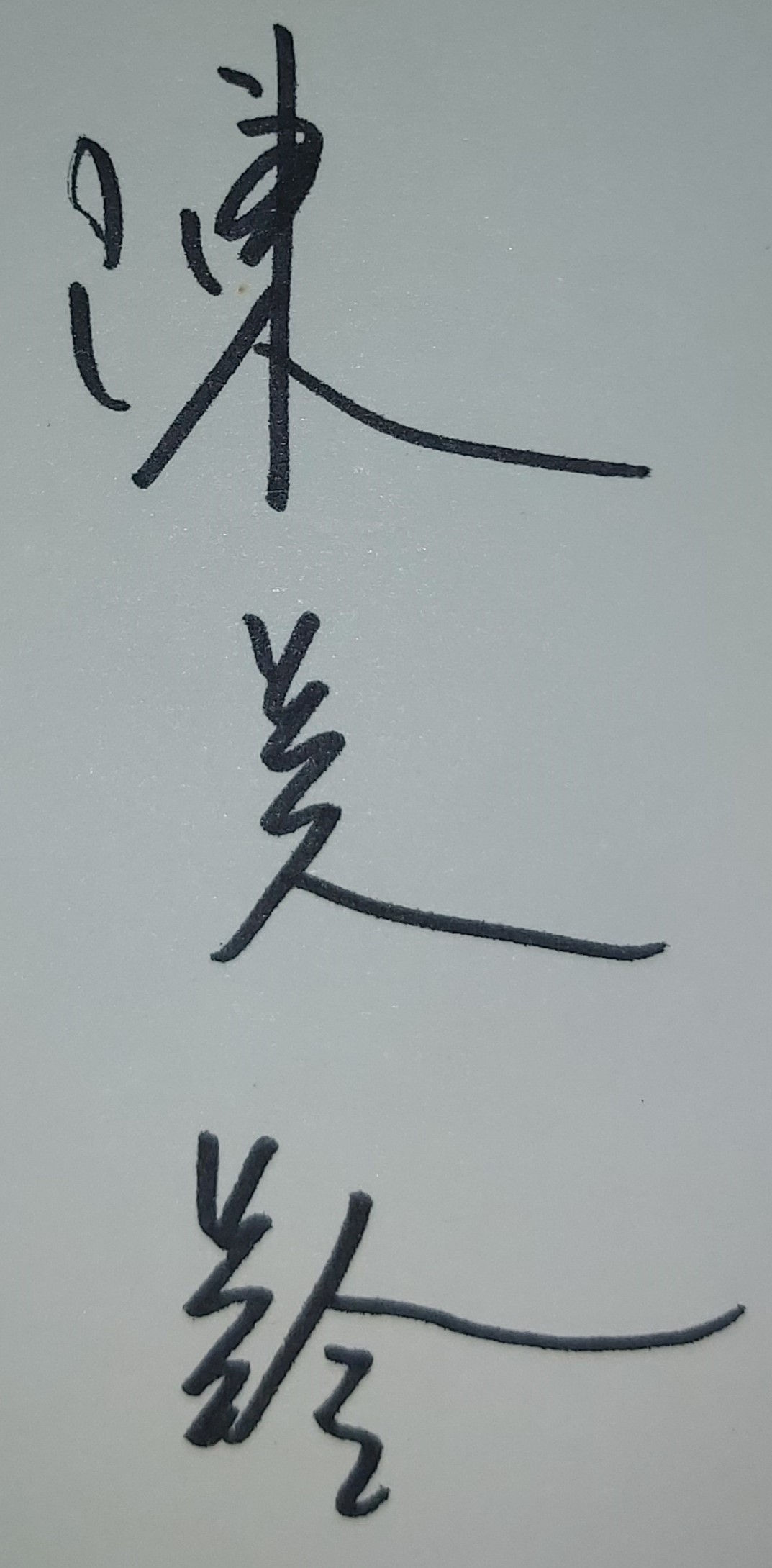

Agnes Miling Kaneko Chan (traditional Chinese: 陳美齡; simplified Chinese: 陈美龄;Japanese: 金子 陳美齢) is a Hong-Kong-born Japanese singer, television personality, university professor, essayist and novelist. Since 1998, Chan has been a UNICEF Goodwill Ambassador and supports the Japan Committee for UNICEF. In Japan she is professionally known as Agnes Chan (アグネス・チャン), Agnes being her Christian name.

== Early life ==
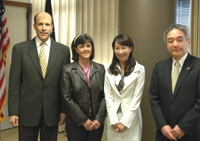
Chan with John Roos (US Ambassador to Japan), Susan Roos (Partner of Cook Roos Wilbur) and Ken Hayami (Executive Director of the Japan Committee for UNICEF)

Agnes Chan became her family's fourth daughter when she was born at Tsan Yuk Hospital in Sai Ying Pun. Her father is a native of Hong Kong Island. She has six siblings: three brothers and three sisters.

She began singing and playing guitar in her junior high years in Hong Kong, as volunteer work for fundraising events. She had a chance to record a cover of Joni Mitchell's "The Circle Game" with her older sister, actress Irene Chan, and it became a hit song in Hong Kong. She became famous throughout southeast Asia through several of Chang Cheh's movies, including Young People and The Generation Gap.

Japanese singer-songwriter Masaaki Hirao brought Chan to Japan and in 1972, she recorded her first Japanese pop hit, "Poppy Flower (ひなげしの花)." Her clear voice, pretty looks, and imperfect Japanese made her a teenage idol. In 1973, her third single, "Splendor in the Grass (草原の輝き)," earned her the Japan Record Grand Prix "Rookie of the Year" award. She graduated from The American School in Japan in 1973.

In 1973, she first appeared on Kōhaku Uta Gassen, the annual New Year's Eve musical competition aired on NHK, with "Poppy Flower (ひなげしの花)", and subsequently made two more consecutive appearances on the show.

Chan enrolled in Tokyo's Sophia University and studied for two years, after which she decided to take a break from the entertainment business and study social child psychology at the University of Toronto in Canada.

After graduating in 1978, Chan returned to Japan to resume her singing career. Her first Cantonese album was released in Hong Kong in 1979. She won a prize for her peace thesis for International Youth Year 1985. Her first concert in China, a benefit for Soong Ching-ling's children's fund, was held in 1985 at Beijing's capital gym for an audience of 54,000.

Chan's 1984 visit to Ethiopia during a drastic drought and food shortage was covered for the Nippon Television Network's annual "24-Hour TV" charity special. Through these events, she resumed her volunteer work as she continued her entertainment career.

In 1986, Chan married her former manager, Tsutomu Kaneko, and gave birth to her eldest son in Canada. When she returned to Japan the next year she would bring her infant along to the workplace, which was seen as highly controversial ("Agnes" became something of a buzzword in Japan) and raised the question of a mother's place in the working world.

In 1989, Chan began studying with Stanford University's department of education. With Myra H. Strober, she investigated the situations of 10 graduates from Tokyo University and Stanford 10 years after their graduation. This showed significant differences between the men and women of Japan and the US, and earned Chan her PhD in 1994. Chan returned to Japan as a lecturer, essayist, and university professor.

In 1998, Chan was appointed the first ambassador of the Japan Committee for UNICEF, established as an independent local non-governmental organisation in Japan, under agreement with UNICEF.

Chan's education had a profound impact on her singing career: by 2000 her recordings had taken a darker, moodier tone.

In 2002, Chan began her work as a novelist with Perfect Couple and Bullet Ring.

Chan released her first self-cover single, "Splendor in the Grass 2005 (草原の輝き2005)," in 2005, and Asahi beverage used the song in an herbal-tea commercial. Chan's latest single is "Flower of Happiness (しあわせの花)". In October, she won the 14th Pestalozzi Education Award presented by Hiroshima University.

Her new English-language album Forget Yourself, including a duet with legendary Chinese performer Jackie Chan, was released in the United States in February 2006.

Chan is planning to release three new Japanese singles and make an album during 2007; she also plans to perform 35th-anniversary concerts in 100 Japanese cities and Beijing, China in 2007 and 2008.

In October 2007, it was reported that Chan had undergone breast-cancer surgery in a Tokyo hospital, and is expected to make a full recovery.

She is a Roman Catholic.

== Present main regular programs ==
=== Television ===
- TV Tokyo – Kitajima Wink Heart (Ended by Sep. 2007)
- Chiba TV – Agnes' Music Salon (Ended by Jan. 2006)

=== Radio ===
- Radio Nippon(RF) – Agnes' Sunny Side Up
- RTHK – City Snapshot (September 2005 – March 2006)

== Discography ==
=== Albums ===
- 1971 Will the circle game be unbroken
- 1972 ORIGINAL(1), Poppy flower ひなげしの花, With Love from Agnes
- 1973 As Stars, As Flowers 花のように、星のように, Splendor in the Grass 草原の輝き, Flower Concert
- 1974 Agnes's small diary アグネスの小さな日記, The Concert for Your and Me あなたとわたしのコンサート, Fly of Swallows 燕飛翔
- 1975 The Story of Small Love (小さな恋のおはなし), Family concert ファミリー・コンサート, Hello To Youth はじめまして青春, Say Thank You To You あなたにありがとう, Loving Songs, I Am in Love 我在戀愛
- 1976 Mei Mei – Dream all the time Mei Mei いつでも夢を, See You Again Some Day また逢う日まで, Where shall I go to look for my lover 愛人那裡去尋找, Agnes Chan, Memorial of Love 愛のメモリアル
- 1977 How are you? お元気ですか, My lover 私の恋人, With love from Canada カナダより愛をこめて
- 1978 Happy Again, Ready, Go! ヨーイドン
- 1979 Agnes in Wonderland, ABC AGNES, Carnation in the rain 雨中康乃馨, Beautiful days 美しい日々
- 1980 Message, Agnes Chan (Morning Star, Love robber, Wonderer) 晨星・情劫・流浪客・問我是誰, Swallow has come back 歸來的燕子
- 1981 Love Me Little Love Me Long, Mystic words for love 愛的咒語, Absorbed in love, Anxiety-forgetting grass 痴戀・忘憂草
- 1982 Song of Lijiang River 漓江曲, Half Time, Christmas Song Medley
- 1983 Small question 小さな質問, Girl Friends, Wish you to being mellow 願你繼續醉
- 1985 Loving Harmony 愛的Harmony, Love will be found – City romance 愛が見つかりそう City Romance
- 1990 Dear Agnes – Carpenters collection
- 1992 World nursery rhyme and baby-sitter song complete volume I-V 世界兒歌催眠曲全集I～V
- 1999 Famous baby-sitter song and nursery rhymes in the world 世界催眠曲兒歌名曲集
- 2000 Happy kids songs by Agnes アグネスのたのしいどうよう, English songs by Agnes アグネスのえいごのうた, Melancholy, Love, Peace & Freedom
- 2001 Private novel – My Love Story 私小説-My Love Story
- 2002 Now and Then, Agnes Chan CD BOX
- 2005 Lost & Found -Come to Me- Lost & Found-私のもとへ-
- 2006 Forget Yourself (Audio CD with DVD)
- 2008 Peaceful World 世界へとどけ平和への歌声-ピースフルワールド

=== Charted singles ===
#	Title	Date/Position	Sales
1	Hinageshi no Hana (ひなげしの花); Debut single in Japan	72.11.25 (#5)	328,000
2	Yousei no Uta (妖精の詩)	73.04.10 (#5)	270,000
3	Sougen no Kagayaki (草原の輝き)	73.07.25 (#2)	445,000
4	Chiisana Koi no Monogatari (小さな恋の物語)	73.10.25 (#1)	580,000
5	Hoshi ni Negai wo (星に願いを)	74.02.25 (#4)	340,000
6	Pocket Ippai no Himitsu (ポケットいっぱいの秘密)	74.06.10 (#6)	223,000
7	Utsukushii Asa Gakimasu (美しい朝が来ます)	74.09.10 (#8)	184,000
8	Ai no Mayoiko (愛の迷い子)	74.12.21 (#2)	402,000
9	Koibito Tachi no Gogo (恋人たちの午後)	75.03.25 (#7)	189,000
10	Hadashi no Bouken (はだしの冒険)	75.06.10 (#12)	147,000
11	Shiroi Kutsu Shita wa Niawa Nai (白いくつ下は似合わない)	75.08.25 (#12)	148,000
12	Fuyu no hi no Kaerimichi (冬の日の帰り道)	75.12.10 (#14)	123,000
13	Koi no Seesaw Game (恋のシーソー・ゲーム)	76.04.10 (#8)	193,000
14	Yume o Kudasai (夢をください)	76.08.10 (#14)	96,000
15	Kokoro ni Tsubasa o Kudasai (心に翼を下さい)	77.04.25 (#32)	56,000
16	Sukoshi Mattete (少し待ってて)	77.08.25 (#64)	17,000
17	Hana no Sasayaki (花のささやき)	77.11.25 (#68)	10,000
18	Again (アゲイン)	78.08.25 (#22)	92,000
19	Yasashiza Shirazu (やさしさ知らず)	78.11.25 (#52)	29,000
20	Kagami no Naka no Watashi (鏡の中の私)	79.03.30 (#76)	13,000
21	100 Mannin no Jabberwocky (100万人のジャバウォーキー)	79.07.25 (#97)	2,000
22	Ai no Harmony (愛のハーモニー)	84.11.25 (#61)	27,000
23	Lovin' You is Killin' Me	00.06.21 (#50)	26,000
24	Time to Say Goodbye	01.04.25 (#82)	9000
25	My Love Story	01.09.21 (#91)	4000
26	Kokoro no Tabibito (心の旅人)	03.10.22 (#97)	3000
27	Sokoni Wa Shiawase Gamō Umarete Irukara (そこには 幸せがもう生まれているから)	07.03.07 (#26)	27,000

== Commercials ==
- Ajinomoto
- Bridgestone
- ECC Junior
- Meiji
- Mitsubishi Electric
- Suntory

== Written works ==
- 1983 My Chinese Dishes by Agnes
- 1984 Be Peaceful With Songs
- 1984 We All Are the People Who Live on the Earth
- 1993 Neo Woman
- 1994 Mama You Don't Need to be a Doctor
- 1996 We All Are the People Who Live on the Earth Part 2
- 1997 Hong Kong Guide by Agnes
- 1999 The Road Winds Uphill All The Way (collaboration with Myra H. Strober), We All are the People Who Live For the Future
- 2001 Positive Child Care by Agnes
- 2002 Perfection Couple, Ring of Bullet
- 2003 This Road Leads to the Hill (Japanese translation)
- 2004 Cheers to the World!, Japan, Where I Love, Messages from Little Lives
- 2005 The Right Track-To People Who Live for the Future-, What the Marriage Life Is?(collaboration with Yoko Kitajima)
- 2006 Agnes' Style Aging – Chinese Herbal Detoxification, Flowers, Colors, and Birthday Messages (collaboration)
- 2007 We All Are the People Who Live on the Earth Part 3, 26 Words of Love for Finding Happiness by Mother Teresa
