= Mad Monkey Kung Fu =

1979 Hong Kong film by Lau Kar-leung

- Film poster
- Directed by: Lau Kar-leung
- Written by: Ni Kuang
- Produced by: Mona Fong
- Starring: Hsiao Hou; Lau Kar-leung; Lo Lieh; Kara Hui Ying-hung; Ching Chu
- Cinematography: Arthur Wong
- Edited by: Chiang Hsing-lung; Li Yen-hai
- Music by: Eddie H. Wang Chi-Ren
- Distributed by: Shaw Brothers Studio
- Release date: October 5, 1979 (Hong Kong)
- Running time: 115 minutes
- Country: Hong Kong
- Language: Mandarin

Mad Monkey Kung Fu (Chinese: 瘋猴; pinyin: fēng hóu; Jyutping: fung1 hau4) is a 1979 Shaw Brothers kung fu film directed by Lau Kar-leung. Later, the film was released on DVD by Dragon Dynasty.

Besides directing Mad Monkey Kung Fu, Lau Kar-Leung, (also known as Liu Chia-liang) plays the lead character who is crippled by the villain in a devious plot that defames the martial arts master. The character later goes on to teach a young vagrant his unique monkey style kung-fu, who then avenges his shame.

== Plot ==
Esteemed Monkey style Kung Fu master and opera actor, Chen (Chia-Liang Liu), is befuddled in a devious plot designed to exploit his alcoholism and tarnish his otherwise flawless credibility amongst townspeople where he and his beautiful sister Miss Chen (Kara Wai) performs. In a plot to defame Chen as a master of Kung Fu, ruin Chen and his sister's opera troupe and gain Miss Chen as a brothel worker, the villainous gangster and brothel-owner Tuan (Lo Lieh) along with his wife whom acts as the brothel Mistress, frame a drunken Chen for the rape of Tuan's wife, and inform Chen and his sister that the punishment for his "crime" is death, however Chen's sister offers herself to be Tuan's concubine and work in the brothel indefinitely in exchange for her brother's life. Getting exactly what he and his wife wanted, Tuan's agrees, though only with the addition of being able to cripple Chen's hands, knowing he will have ruined Chen's status as a master of Kung Fu in doing so.

Years pass by, and after the tragedy that befell he and his sister, Chen comes to terms with his alcoholism, and maintains a life of sobriety. Chen also gives up opera performing and practicing monkey style Kung Fu, as he is haunted by a regret and shame that he is to blame for his sister's life due to his previous inability to maintain sobriety. Chen struggles as a street entertainer and candy salesman (now somewhat of a local celebrity due to his kind and giving nature) to make ends meet, performing with his beloved trained monkey Ah Mao.

A young thief, albeit with a good heart, named Monkey, (Hsiao Ho) watches on with a group of children at Chen and Ah Mao's entertainment showcase, until it is interrupted by a group of the town's thugs and extortionists. When Chen barely affords to pay them, they retaliate by destroying Chen's set and throwing his candies across the town square. Monkey steps in to help Chen clean up and collect his things as the extortionists storm off through town. Monkey cracks up a plan to steal back the money that the extortionists had taken from Chen and gift him with a warm meal for dinner.

After successfully stealing the money back from the local extortionists, Monkey later visits Chen at his home on the outskirts of town with an expensive meal and wine to enjoy, knowing Chen likely lost all of his money to the extortionists earlier. Chen, who believes Monkey has sought him out for a show, asks the young man's name, to which Monkey explains he doesn't know his own name, but is called Monkey. Chen remarks that he ..."does act like one." and tells him that no show will be going on that night, and he begins to return to the paltry meal he's made for himself. Monkey begins to unpack the meal he's brought for Chen, waving the expensive wine he's purchased under Chen's nose. Chen starkly refuses the wine at first, even attempting to kick Monkey out for tempting him. Chen soon apologizes for his brash action after seeing Monkey meant no harm, and accepts the meal, offering to dine with Monkey. He then inquires how Monkey could possibly afford the expensive meal he's offered. Monkey reveals he's stolen the money for it, and from the thugs that extorted Chen earlier at that, stating, "...After all, if you're not strong, you have to steal." Chen realizes Monkey has been dealt a bad card, and comments on the cruelty of the unforgiving world they live in, and agrees to eat the gift of a meal with Monkey, and Ah Mao at his side.

The two bond over the meal and soon begin an odd friendship, where Monkey occasionally visits Chen for advice and guidance. Monkey continues to steal for a living, until he is caught by the local thugs who beat him up and run him out of town. Monkey seeks solace with Chen who reprimands him for his continued stealing, warning him that if he continues, he'll likely end up dead. Monkey refutes Chen's notion with the statement that if he does not steal, he'll die from starvation anyhow, to which Chen states: "I don't steal... I don't starve." Though true, Monkey sees his situation different from Chen's and remarks: "You're different, you've got a monkey show! I'm different, I HAVE to steal!". Chen pities the young man and the bad card he's been dealt in life, and offers him respite in his home for the night, allowing Monkey to sleep alongside Ah Mao.

The following day, the local thugs again attempt to extort what little money Chen earns from selling candies and doing street entertainment shows with Ah Mao. The extortionists throw Chen's candies across the town square again to distract him, then brutally murder Ah Mao, swinging him in circles from his leash and smashing the small monkey against a tree. Monkey visits Chen at his home later that night after hearing the horrific story of what happened earlier, and offers to get revenge for Ah Mao and Chen, but Chen refuses, as Monkey would surely be risking his life attempting to go against the local extortionists. Monkey instead goes into business with Chen as a stand-in for the late Ah Mao using his natural Monkey like traits and acrobatic skills to put on a compelling and lucrative show for the townspeople. However, once again, the thugs return for more extortion money from Chen, and while Monkey becomes immediately frustrated and attempts to attack the thugs, Chen is able to easily hold Monkey back and keep him grounded so he does not fight back. Chen's pockets are turned out and he is once again robbed of his earnings by the extortionists, which gravely angers Monkey.

When Monkey questions Chen why he does not act when the extortionists come around, Chen's passive attitude angers Monkey and he attempts to storm off for revenge. Chen however stops Monkey in his tracks with relative ease, exclaiming that Monkey would have no chance against them, which makes Monkey highly suspicious of the seemingly helpless old man. Monkey then argues with Chen pointing out that he knows Chen is hiding the fact he knows true Kung Fu rather than the monkey tricks he's been taught for their street performances. Chen disregards this and leaves Monkey bound so he can not act on his anger stating, "Now listen kid... Stick to monkey tricks, and LIVE. You got that!?"

Monkey, feeling his pride stomped on by repeated extortion from the local thugs, confronts the men at a local restaurant. Exclaiming he no longer wants to be called "Monkey" but "Monkey King" by the thugs. He uses his monkey tricks and acrobatics to embarrass the thugs, however they quickly overpower him and quickly beat him to a pulp, leaving him for dead outside of the restaurant. When Monkey returns to Chen, he maintains his stance that he was fighting for justice rather than for violence, and that if he wouldn't have been beaten as badly if Chen had taught him true Kung Fu. Chen reluctantly agrees to this and begins to lightly train Monkey in his unique style of Monkey Kung Fu, far off in the mountains outside of town. Months later, although the training is not quite complete, Monkey believes he is strong enough to defeat not only the extortionists, but the boss they work for, and leaves Master Chen to enact his revenge against them all.

Monkey travels back into town and fights the extortionists, easily defeating them and forcing them to bring him to their boss. Monkey is led to the extortionist's boss, an older man who runs the local brothel and happens to be, the villainous Tuan. Tuan laughs at Monkey's unpolished Monkey style Kung Fu, mockingly suggesting he knows what real Monkey style Kung Fu looks like, and knows how to defeat it. Monkey eagerly confronts Tuan, believing himself to be the better skilled martial artist, but is badly beaten by Tuan, nearly to death; however a suspicious concubine of Tuan's recognizes the distinct style of Kung Fu that Monkey is using, to be that of her own brother's. Revealing herself as Miss Chen, she steps in to assist Monkey in the fight against Tuan; though her efforts merely buy Monkey enough time to escape and she is killed brutally, albeit reluctantly, by Tuan.

Monkey returns to his Master, Chen, bruised and beaten, and details his naive attempts to beat the extortionist's boss, the meeting with Chen's sister, and her death. Chen, tempted to flee into town and avenge his sister, is halted and reminded of his crippled hands by Monkey. With no hesitation, Monkey offers himself to be the hands of his master, and complete his training in Monkey style Kung Fu, to avenge everyone who has befallen the fate of crossing paths with Tuen, and protect the town from his devious acts of extortion and villainy. Chen agrees, and trains intensely for an unspecified time with Monkey, who uses the time to bond with his master in a unique and congruent fashion, coming to model himself as a fighter and a man on a whole, after Chen. Monkey's training concludes after a sparring match shows Monkey has grown fast and strong enough to finally land not only his first, but a nearly unexpected strike on his master, even though Monkey is using Chen's own Monkey style Kung Fu to compete against him. Chen can only smile as he is amazed how quickly Monkey has adapted to and learned his cherished style of martial arts.

Shortly thereafter, Monkey returns to the brothel in town with a new approach. Quickly working his way through all Tuan's henchmen with relative ease, Monkey's temper boils inside and he falters, getting physically trapped in a net by a group of Tuan's henchmen, who attempt to drag Monkey off and execute him. Chen appears just in time, and saves Monkey and they fight side by side thinning out the herd of Tuan's henchmen. When Monkey and Chen prove to be too much for the countless men Tuan throws at them, Tuan challenges them both head to head, and engages in combat with the Master and student. Tuan manages to hold his own against the crippled master and gains the upper hand. Monkey, eager to get revenge steps in to take his master's place and be his hands, and quickly turns the tables on the villainous Tuan. As Monkey fights Tuan by himself, his focus grows, and while calm and collected he clearly outclasses the older man with his youth, let alone sheer skill in martial arts. Seeing that he can't possibly win, Tuan tries to flee the fight, however Monkey doesn't let him, and cripples Tuan's hands by sending them through a thick paned glass lantern, as payback for his master. Chen watches on and excuses the aggressive action as he believes justice has been served, though before he can intervene, Monkey still fueled by rage and not forgetting the lives lost at the hands of Tuan, drags him up a tall balcony in the brothel and jumps off, leaving Tuan to fall to his death on the concrete floor at Chen's feet. As Monkey drops down to return to his master, the remaining staff of the brothel, including Tuan's wife peer down at Monkey and Chen in fear. As Monkey jumps up to teach them a lesson as well, Chen catches him and calms his rage, leaving the brothel and ending their quest of revenge.

== Cast ==
- Lau Kar-leung as Chen
- Hsiao Hou as Monkey
- Lo Lieh as Tuan
- Kara Hui Ying-hung as Miss Chen

== Trivia ==
- In July 2018 New York City's Museum of Modern Art showcased a variety of Lau Kar-Leung's many cinematic creations in an exhibition titled "The Grandmaster Lau Kar-Leung" in which "Mad Monkey Kung Fu" was shown. Scenes of Lau Kar-Leung from Mad Monkey Kung Fu were also heavily used to promote the exhibition.
- A clip from the movie appears in a 2023 animated movie Teenage Mutant Ninja Turtles: Mutant Mayhem in which the title characters were trained in martial arts by their father figure Master Splinter by showing them various video clips containing martial arts, including from other classic Shaw Brothers films.
