= Monk scam =

Scam done by individuals pretending to be Buddhist Monks

A monk scam is a fraudulent activity in which individuals pose as Buddhist monks to solicit donations from unsuspecting people, most often tourists. The scammers dress in monk robes and claim to be building a temple, offer a petition to sign, or give out a bracelet or medallion in exchange for a donation.

The scammers, typically men but sometimes women, dress in the orange robes of Buddhist monks with shaved heads. They approach a target and offer a shiny medallion or a plastic bracelet, and then ask for a donation, showing the target a list of signatures of previous donors. If the person hesitates or shows no interest, the items are quickly taken back.

The scam has been documented in New York City (where it is common in Times Square and on the High Line), San Francisco, Australia, New Zealand, Canada, and London.

Many Westerners are not able to discern between real monks and scammers. The Buddhist Council of New York, which represents about two dozen Buddhist temples, has made posts on social media to warn people about the scam. The director of the Kurukulla Center for Tibetan Buddhist Studies in Medford, Massachusetts, said the scammers are creating "heavy negative karma" for themselves.

Cracking down on the scammers can be limited by the large crowds they work in, with more serious crimes taking priority by law enforcement. In New York City, the act of panhandling in public spaces is not illegal, but aggressive panhandling is. Enforcement of the law is stymied by the scammers fleeing if law enforcement is called. In New Zealand, the scammers have been traced to a Chinese crime syndicate that provides the clothing and assists with immigration visas and accommodations. Chinese government officials created an online registry of all Buddhist and Taoist sites so that fake ones can easily be identified.

Signs warning of the scam have been placed where it is common.
