= The Devil's Mirror =

1972 Hong Kong film by Sun Chung

- 風雷魔鏡
- Directed by: Sun Chung
- Written by: Chiang Yang
- Produced by: Runme Shaw
- Starring: Shu Pei-pei; Lau Dan; Li Chia-chien
- Cinematography: Wang Yung-lung
- Edited by: Chiang Hsing-lung
- Music by: Chen Yung-yu
- Distributed by: Shaw Brothers Studio
- Release date: 1972
- Running time: 86 minutes
- Country: Hong Kong
- Language: Mandarin

The Devil's Mirror (風雷魔鏡) is a 1972 Hong Kong wuxia film produced by the Shaw Brothers Studio and the directorial debut of Sun Chung.

== Synopsis ==
Jiuyou Monü, an evil female martial artist, seeks to dominate the wulin with her sorcery powers. She can only be countered by divine light reflected from the Thunder and Wind Mirrors, which are respectively in the possession of two martial arts clans: Jinshimen and Jixianzhuang. Jiuyou Monü attempts to stir up conflict between the two clans to prevent them from uniting against her. Wen Jianfeng, the young master of Jinshimen, meets Bai Xiaofeng, the daughter of Jixianzhuang's leader, and they work together to resolve the misunderstanding and defeat Jiuyou Monü.

== Cast ==
- Shu Pei-pei as Bai Xiaofeng
- Lau Dan as Wen Jianfeng
- Li Chia-chien as Jiuyou Monü
- Wang Hsieh as Bai Tianxiong
- Ching Miao as Master Wen
- Tung Lam as Leng Yun
