= Heroes Shed No Tears (1980 film) =

1980 Hong Kong film by Chor Yuen

- Film poster
- 英雄無淚
- Directed by: Chor Yuen
- Written by: Chor Yuen
- Produced by: Run Run Shaw
- Starring: Alexander Fu; Derek Yee; Ku Feng; Jason Pai; Ku Kuan-chung
- Cinematography: Wong Chit
- Edited by: Chiang Hsing-lung; Yu Siu-fung
- Music by: Eddie H. Wang; Joseph Koo
- Production company: Shaw Brothers Studio
- Distributed by: Shaw Brothers Studio
- Release date: 24 July 1980
- Running time: 105 minutes
- Country: Hong Kong
- Language: Mandarin

Heroes Shed No Tears (英雄無淚) is a 1980 Hong Kong wuxia film adapted from the novel Ying Xiong Wu Lei by Gu Long. It was directed by Chor Yuen and produced by the Shaw Brothers Studio, starring Alexander Fu and Derek Yee.

== Synopsis ==
Young swordsman Gao Jianfei uses a unique sword with a teardrop fashioned into its blade. He is charged with averting an impending crisis in the wulin, but the villain Zhuo Donglai wishes to rule the wulin and launches a scheme to pit the various heroes against one another.

== Cast ==
- Alexander Fu as Gao Jianfei
- Derek Yee as Zhuo Donglai
- Ku Feng as Zhu Meng
- Jason Pai as Sima Chaoqun
- Ku Kuan-chung as Zhuo Qing / Cai Chong
- Elliot Ngok as Xiao Leixue
- Angie Chiu as Diewu
- Lau Wai-ling as Wu Wan
- Yuen Wah as Wood Chicken
- Yuen Bun as Han Zhang
- Austin Wai as Sun Tong
- Keung Hon as Yang Jian
- Lam Fai-wong as Nailed Shoe
- Wang Sha as Zhuo Donglai's master
- Cheng Miu as Gao Jianfei's master
- Yeung Chi-hing as Agen
- Jamie Luk as Bull
- Wong Ching-ho as Beggar Gongsun
