= The Brave Archer 2 =

1978 Hong Kong film by Chang Cheh

- Theatrical poster
- 射鵰英雄傳續集
- Directed by: Chang Cheh
- Screenplay by: Ni Kuang
- Based on: The Legend of the Condor Heroes by Jin Yong
- Produced by: Runme Shaw
- Starring: Alexander Fu; Niu-niu
- Cinematography: Kung Mu-to
- Edited by: Chiang Hsing-lung
- Music by: Frankie Chan
- Production company: Shaw Brothers Studio
- Distributed by: Shaw Brothers Studio
- Release date: 13 May 1978
- Running time: 110 minutes
- Country: Hong Kong
- Language: Mandarin

The Brave Archer 2 (射鵰英雄傳續集), also known as Kungfu Warlord 2, is a 1978 Hong Kong wuxia film adapted from the novel The Legend of the Condor Heroes by Jin Yong. The film was produced by the Shaw Brothers Studio and directed by Chang Cheh, starring Alexander Fu and Niu-niu. The film is the second part of a trilogy and was preceded by The Brave Archer (1977) and followed by The Brave Archer 3 (1981). The trilogy has two unofficial sequels, The Brave Archer and His Mate (1982) and Little Dragon Maiden (1983).

== Synopsis ==
Huang Rong is taken hostage by Ouyang Feng, who attempts to use her to seize the Jiuyin Zhenjing. After Guo Jing and Hong Qigong rescue Huang Rong, Guo Jing gives Ouyang Feng a fake copy of the manual, leading him to practise the skills incorrectly and end up in a zouhuorumo state. Ouyang Feng, Hong Qigong and Guo Jing get into a fight, in which Ouyang Ke is injured while Guo Jing and Hong Qigong use the opportunity to escape. However, Hong Qigong is also wounded and he gives Huang Rong his Dog Beating Staff, effectively handing over his leadership of the Beggar Clan to her. Ouyang Feng and Ouyang Ke pursue Guo Jing and Huang Rong to a deserted town for revenge. Guo Jing and Huang Rong take shelter in an abandoned tavern inhabited by only Shagu.

Guo Jing and Huang Rong meet Zhou Botong again to find treasure. Guo Jing is wounded so Zhou Botong fights with Ouyang Feng, while Guo Jing retreats with Huang Rong so that he can get time to heal. They find a secret chamber in the abandoned tavern and hide there while Guo Jing recuperates. At this point, the story splits into several subplots, all taking place in the tavern. Yang Kang kills Ouyang Ke when the latter is about to molest Mu Nianci, and takes the Dog Beating Staff, which Huang Rong had carelessly dropped; Lu Guanying comes in search of Guo Jing; Mei Chaofeng appears and fights with the "Seven Immortals of Quanzhen". Huang Yaoshi comes here in search of his daughter, so Guo Jing and Huang Rong come out of their hiding place to meet him. Huang Yaoshi takes Shagu back to Peach Blossom Island after realising that she is the daughter of one of his former apprentices.

Guo Jing and Huang Rong are kidnapped by members of the Beggar Clan later, who do not recognise them. Just then, Qiu Qianren comes to confront the Beggar Clan. Yang Kang lies that he is the new chief of the Beggar Clan as he has the Dog Beating Staff. However, Guo Jing and Huang Rong break free and challenge Yang Kang. Yang Kang's lies are exposed and he escapes to join Qiu Qianren, while Huang Rong is recognised as the new chief of the Beggar Clan.

== Cast ==
- Alexander Fu as Guo Jing
- Niu-niu as Huang Rong
- Ku Feng as Hong Qigong
- Philip Kwok as Zhou Botong
- Wang Lung-wei as Ouyang Feng
- Ku Kuan-chung as Huang Yaoshi
- Danny Lee as Ouyang Ke
- Lee I-min as Yang Kang
- Kara Hui as Mu Nianci
- Norman Chui as Qiu Chuji
- Bruce Tong as Tan Chuduan
- Suen San-cheung as Liu Chuxuan
- Yu Tai-ping as Hao Datong
- Siu Yuk-lung as Ma Yu
- Robert Tai as Wang Chuyi
- Hung Ling-ling as Sun Bu'er
- Yu Sha-li as Shagu
- Lam Jan-kei as Cheng Yaojia
- Tsai Hung as Ke Zhen'e
- Lam Fai-wong as Zhu Cong
- Jamie Luk as Nan Xiren
- Chow Kin-ping as Quan Jinfa
- Lee Fung as Han Xiaoying
- Lo Mang as Qiu Qianren
- Wong Ching-ho as Elder Peng
- Tu Lung as Elder Jian
- Sun Chien as Lu Guanying
- Yu Hoi-lun as Mei Chaofeng
- Wai Pak as Qu Lingfeng
- Yu Wing as Wanyan Honglie
- Chan Shen as Lingzhi Shangren
- Keung Hon as Liang Ziweng
- Suen Shu-pei as Sha Tongtian
