= The Proud Twins (film) =

1979 Hong Kong film by Chor Yuen

- DVD cover art
- 絕代雙驕
- Directed by: Chor Yuen
- Screenplay by: Chor Yuen
- Story by: Gu Long
- Produced by: Run Run Shaw
- Starring: Alexander Fu; Ng Wai-kwok
- Cinematography: Wong Chit
- Edited by: Chiang Hsing-lung; Yu Siu-fung
- Music by: Eddie H. Wang
- Production company: Shaw Brothers Studio
- Distributed by: Shaw Brothers Studio
- Release date: 19 July 1979
- Running time: 105 minutes
- Country: Hong Kong
- Language: Mandarin

The Proud Twins (絕代雙驕) is a 1979 Hong Kong wuxia film adapted from Gu Long's novel Juedai Shuangjiao. Produced by the Shaw Brothers Studio, the film was directed by Chor Yuen and starred Alexander Fu and Ng Wai-kwok.

== Cast ==
- Alexander Fu as Xiaoyuer
- Ng Wai-kwok as Hua Wuque
- Wong Yung as Yan Nantian
- Wen Hsueh-erh as Tie Xinlan
- Susanna Au-yeung as Murong Jing
- Kitty Meng as Yaoyue
- Tang Ching as Jiang Biehe / Jiang Qin
- Ku Kuan-chung as Jiang Yulang
- Cheng Miu as Wan Chuliu
- Chan Shen as Ten Villains' chief
- Lau Wai-ling as Xiao Mimi
