= The Naval Commandos =

1977 Hong Kong film by Chang Cheh

Naval Commandos
- Film poster
- Chinese: 海軍突擊隊
- Directed by: Chang Cheh; Pao Hsueh-Li; Wu Ma; Liu Wei-Ping
- Written by: Chang Yung-hsiang
- Produced by: Run Run Shaw
- Starring: Liu Yung; David Chiang; Ti Lung; Alexander Fu Sheng; Philip Kwok; Lu Feng; Chiang Sheng
- Cinematography: Kung Mu-To
- Edited by: Chiang Hsing-Lung
- Music by: Frankie Chan
- Production companies: Shaw Brothers Studio; Chang's Film Company; China Motion Pictures Company
- Release date: 7 April 1977
- Running time: 112 minutes
- Countries: Hong Kong; Taiwan
- Language: Cantonese

Naval Commandos is a 1977 Shaw Brothers film directed by Chang Cheh, based upon the Chinese Navy during the Second Sino-Japanese War.

== Plot ==
The Chinese Navy led by its captain (Ti Lung) is attempting to defend its coastline from a Japanese attack, they send their commando unit led by Szu Shih into the mainland to enlist help to thwart the Japanese before they attack. Japanese officers have been hanging out in a place owned by David Chiang and his hot-headed body guard Fu Sheng but they are secretly opposed to the Japanese. The commandos enlist the help of Chiang and Sheng to kill the Japanese officers led by Shan Mao and destroy their attacking ships.

== Cast ==
- Tony Liu - Chinese Navy Admiral Vice-Admiral An Chi Pang
- Ti Lung – Chinese Navy Captain Liang Kuan Chin
- David Chiang – Shanghai Boss Song San
- Alexander Fu Sheng – Shanghai resistance fighter Shiao Liu
- Chi Kuan-Chun - Chinese Navy Captain and Shanghai resistance leader Cui Hsia
- Kuo Chui – Naval Commando Sgt. Shu Kuan
- Chiang Sheng – Naval Commando Sgt. Chiang Ping Kuang
- Lu Feng - Naval Commando Sgt. Shu Shiang-Lin
- Tang Yen-Tsan - Naval Commando Sgt. Shao Kang Fa
- Shan Mao – Japanese Naval Captain Hiroda
