= The Brave Archer and His Mate =

1982 Hong Kong film by Chang Cheh

- Theatrical poster
- 神鵰俠侶
- Directed by: Chang Cheh
- Screenplay by: Ni Kuang; Chang Cheh
- Based on: The Legend of the Condor Heroes and The Return of the Condor Heroes by Jin Yong
- Produced by: Mona Fong
- Starring: Alexander Fu; Philip Kwok; Gigi Wong
- Cinematography: Cho Wai-kei
- Edited by: Chiang Hsing-lung; Lee Yim-hoi
- Music by: Eddie H. Wang
- Production company: Shaw Brothers Studio
- Release date: 25 February 1982
- Running time: 100 minutes
- Country: Hong Kong
- Language: Mandarin
- Box office: HK$1,627,031

The Brave Archer and His Mate (神鵰俠侶), also known as The Brave Archer 4 and Mysterious Island, is a 1982 Hong Kong wuxia film adapted from the novels The Legend of the Condor Heroes and The Return of the Condor Heroes by Jin Yong. The Brave Archer and His Mate is a direct sequel to The Brave Archer, The Brave Archer 2 and The Brave Archer 3. It is followed by an unofficial sequel, Little Dragon Maiden (1983).

== Synopsis ==
Guo Jing and Huang Rong return to Peach Blossom Island and are shocked to see that the Seven Freaks of Jiangnan have all been murdered except for Ke Zhen'e. Guo Jing is tricked into believing that Huang Yaoshi is responsible for the murders so he attempts to avenge his masters by fighting Huang Yaoshi. Huang Rong eventually uncovers the truth and reveals that the murders were committed by Ouyang Feng and Yang Kang. Ouyang Feng and Yang Kang want to make Guo Jing and Huang Yaoshi kill each other, so that Yang Kang can learn the Jiuyin Zhenjing from Ouyang Feng. Yang Kang ultimately dies of poisoning, leaving behind a son, Yang Guo, whom he has fathered with Mu Nianci. Mu Nianci also dies after entrusting Yang Guo to the care of Guo Jing and Huang Rong.

Eighteen years later, Yang Guo has grown up under the couple's care alongside their daughter, Guo Fu, and the brothers Wu Xiuwen and Wu Dunru, whom the couple have taken as their apprentices. Guo Jing teaches the Wu brothers martial arts, but refuses to train Yang Guo as he is worried that Yang Guo will follow in his father's footsteps.

Yang Guo develops a rivalry with the Wu brothers and Guo Fu, and leaves the island. He meets Ouyang Feng, who has become insane due to zouhuorumo. Ouyang Feng likes Yang Guo and teaches him the "Toad Skill". Yang Guo begins to suspect that Guo Jing and Huang Rong might be responsible for his parents' deaths after listening to Ouyang Feng's incomplete account of the story. The misunderstanding is resolved by Guo Jing, who takes Yang Guo to the Quanzhen School to be properly educated and trained by Yang Kang's former masters.

Guo Jing and Yang Guo arrive at Quanzhen and witness a battle between Quanzhen and some intruders led by Huodu and Daerba. Huodu and Daerba attempt to break their way into a tomb near Quanzhen, but Guo Jing and Yang Guo thwart their plans and defeat them.

== Cast ==
- Alexander Fu as Yang Guo
- Philip Kwok as Guo Jing
- Gigi Wong as Huang Rong
- Lung Tien-hsiang as Yang Kang
- Lam Sau-kwan as Mu Nianci
- Wen Hsueh-erh as Guo Fu
- Wong Lik as Ouyang Feng
- Kwan Fung as Huang Yaoshi
- Chin Siu-ho as Wu Xiuwen
- Lau Fong-sai as Wu Dunru
- Chiang Sheng as Huodu
- Danny Lee as Ouyang Ke
- Chu Ko as Daerba
- Chan Shen as Ke Zhen'e
- Chow Kin-ping as Zhu Cong
- Wan Seung-lam as Han Baoju
- Wong Wa as Nan Xiren
- Ching Li as Han Xiaoying
- Lu Feng as Zhao Zhijing
- Hung Fung as Hao Datong
- Wai Wang as Qiu Chuji
- Wang Han-chen as Ma Yu
- Wong Ching-ho as Wang Chuyi
