= The Brave Archer 3 =

1981 Hong Kong film by Chang Cheh

- Theatrical poster
- 射鵰英雄傳第三集
- Directed by: Chang Cheh
- Screenplay by: Ni Kuang; Chang Cheh
- Based on: The Legend of the Condor Heroes by Jin Yong
- Produced by: Mona Fong
- Starring: Alexander Fu; Niu-niu
- Cinematography: Cho Wai-kei
- Edited by: Chiang Hsing-lung; Lee Yim-hoi
- Music by: So Jan-hung; Stephen Shing; Joseph Koo
- Production company: Shaw Brothers Studio
- Distributed by: Shaw Brothers Studio
- Release date: 12 November 1981
- Running time: 92 minutes
- Country: Hong Kong
- Language: Mandarin

The Brave Archer 3 (射鵰英雄傳第三集), also known as Blast of the Iron Palm, is a 1981 Hong Kong wuxia film adapted from the novel The Legend of the Condor Heroes by Jin Yong. The film was produced by the Shaw Brothers Studio and directed by Chang Cheh, starring Alexander Fu and Niu-niu in the lead roles. The film is the third part of a trilogy and was preceded by The Brave Archer (1977) and The Brave Archer 2 (1978). The film has two unofficial sequels, The Brave Archer and His Mate (1982) and Little Dragon Maiden (1983), both of which were based on The Return of the Condor Heroes. The theme song of the film, "Sizhangji" (四張機), was composed by Chang Cheh, arranged by Joseph Koo and performed in Cantonese by Jenny Tseng.

== Synopsis ==
Guo Jing and Huang Rong pursue Yang Kang to Iron Palm Peak, where Qiu Qianren and the Iron Palm Sect are based. Huang Rong is injured by Qiu Qianren in a fight and she escapes with Guo Jing's help. Guo Jing takes her in search of a cure to heal her wounds and they stumble upon a house in a swamp, inhabited by a woman called Yinggu. Yinggu tells them that the only person who can save Huang Rong's life is Duan Zhixing, the former ruler of the Kingdom of Dali who has become a monk.

Guo Jing and Huang Rong travel to find Duan Zhixing, but they must defeat his four bodyguards in a battle of wits first. They manage to overcome the odds and eventually meet Duan Zhixing. Duan Zhixing explains to them that Yinggu had directed them to him on purpose, because in order to save Huang Rong, he will need to use his neigong in a way that may cost him his life. Duan Zhixing then proceeds to tell them a story of his past. Yinggu was actually his concubine when he was still the ruler of Dali, but he neglected her due to his obsession with martial arts and she had a secret affair with Zhou Botong. Yinggu became pregnant with Zhou Botong's child later. The infant was mortally wounded by a masked man, who wanted to force Duan Zhixing to use his neigong to save the infant's life. Duan Zhixing refused and the child died. Yinggu hates Duan Zhixing for that and she left him to lead a life in the swamp, while secretly plotting her revenge. Duan Zhixing tells Guo Jing and Huang Rong that he regrets his past decision and he will risk his life to save Huang Rong now.

While Duan Zhixing is healing Huang, Yinggu infiltrates the residence and almost kills Duan Zhixing, but she changes her mind at the last moment. Duan Zhixing does not blame her and allows her to leave again. Just then, Qiu Qianren and the Iron Palm Sect's members show up to challenge Duan Zhixing to a fight. Yinggu recognises Qiu Qianren's martial arts technique and realises that he is actually the masked man who injured her child, and she joins in the fight. Not long later, Zhou Botong appears and Yinggu recognises him. Zhou Botong points out the weaknesses in Qiu Qianren's martial arts and eventually the protagonists defeat the Iron Palm Sect. The film ends with Yinggu running after Zhou Botong.

== Cast ==
- Alexander Fu as Guo Jing
- Niu-niu as Huang Rong
- Philip Kwok as Zhou Botong
- Yu Tai-ping as Yang Kang
- Yeung Hung as Wang Chongyang
- Ti Lung as Duan Zhixing
- Lau Wai-ling as the Queen of Dali
- Ching Li as Yinggu
- Lu Feng as Zhang Shaoshou
- Sun Chien as Zhu Ziliu
- Wong Lik as Wu Santong
- Chiang Sheng as Diancang Yuyin
- Lo Mang as Qiu Qianren
- Chu Ko as Qiu Li
