= The Brave Archer =

1977 Hong Kong film by Chang Cheh

- Theatrical poster
- 射鵰英雄傳
- Directed by: Chang Cheh
- Screenplay by: Ni Kuang
- Based on: The Legend of the Condor Heroes by Jin Yong
- Produced by: Runme Shaw
- Starring: Alexander Fu; Tien Niu
- Cinematography: Kung Mu-to
- Edited by: Chiang Hsing-lung
- Music by: Frankie Chan
- Production company: Shaw Brothers Studio
- Distributed by: Shaw Brothers Studio
- Release date: 30 July 1977
- Running time: 127 minutes
- Country: Hong Kong
- Language: Mandarin

The Brave Archer (射鵰英雄傳), also known as Kungfu Warlord, is a 1977 Hong Kong wuxia film adapted from the novel The Legend of the Condor Heroes by Jin Yong. The film was produced by the Shaw Brothers Studio and directed by Chang Cheh, starring Alexander Fu and Tien Niu. The film is the first part of a trilogy and was followed by The Brave Archer 2 (1978) and The Brave Archer 3 (1981). The trilogy has two unofficial sequels, The Brave Archer and His Mate (1982) and Little Dragon Maiden (1983).

== Synopsis ==
Guo Jing and Yang Kang are the sons of two rebels. After the rebels were killed, the boys were saved by martial artists, who decide to raise and train the boys separately, and let them compete with each other once they have grown up to see who is better. Guo Jing was trained by the "Seven Freaks of Jiangnan", while Yang Kang becomes the foster son of a Jurchen prince.

When he reaches adulthood, Guo Jing travels to a local town, where he meets and befriends Huang Rong, who is actually the daughter of Peach Blossom Island's master Huang Yaoshi. He also meets Yang Kang, without knowing his true identity, during a contest to win the hand-in-marriage of Mu Nianci. Unknown to Yang Kang, his father is still alive and has adopted Mu Nianci. Tempted by the glory of being a prince's son, Yang Kang refuses to acknowledge his biological father and betrays him, causing his biological parents to die.

Huang Rong and Guo Jing go on adventures together. Guo Jing learns the "Eighteen Dragon-Subduing Palms" from Hong Qigong, while Huang Rong is groomed by Hong Qigong to become his successor as chief of the Beggar Clan. They travel to Peach Blossom Island later to meet Huang Yaoshi, who does not approve of his daughter's marriage to Guo Jing. While exploring the island, Guo Jing meets Zhou Botong, who teaches him special martial arts techniques and forces him to read a manual, which is later revealed to be written by Huang Rong's late mother.

Ouyang Feng visits Peach Blossom Island with his nephew Ouyang Ke, and he proposes a marriage between his nephew and Huang Rong. Just then, Hong Qigong also arrives and he strongly supports Guo Jing to marry Huang Rong. Eventually, Huang Yaoshi arranges for a contest between Guo Jing and Ouyang Ke to determine who is worthy of his daughter's hand-in-marriage. The last part of the contest involves both of them having to read a manual and recite it from memory later. As Guo had already read the manual earlier, he recites it easily and wins the contest. Huang Yaoshi agrees to his daughter's marriage to Guo Jing. However, Ouyang Feng realises that the manual is actually the fabled Jiuyin Zhenjing and wants it for himself.

== Cast ==
- Alexander Fu as Guo Jing
- Tien Niu as Huang Rong
- Ku Feng as Hong Qigong
- Philip Kwok as Zhou Botong
- Wang Lung-wei as Ouyang Feng
- Ku Kuan-chung as Huang Yaoshi
- Ti Lung as Duan Zhixing
- Danny Lee as Ouyang Ke
- Lee I-min as Yang Kang
- Kara Hui as Mu Nianci
- Yu Hoi-lun as Mei Chaofeng
- Wang Chiang-liang as Chen Xuanfeng
- Yu Wing as Wanyan Honglie
- Dick Wei as Yang Tiexin
- Lau Wai-ling as Bao Xiruo
- Bruce Tong as Guo Xiaotian
- Chu Jing as Li Ping
- Fan Mei-sheng as Liang Ziweng
- Chan Shen as Lingzhi Shangren
- Suen Shu-pei as Sha Tongtian
- Tsai Hung as Ke Zhen'e
- Lam Fai-wong as Zhu Cong
- Lo Mang as Han Baoju
- Jamie Luk as Nan Xiren
- Lu Feng as Zhang Asheng
- Chiu Chung-hing as Quan Jinfa
- Chow Kit as Han Xiaoying
- Lee Siu-wa as Wang Chuyi
- Yeung Hung as Qiu Chuji
- Yip Tin-hang as Lu Chengfeng
