= Hong Qigong =

Fictional character in the Condor Trilogy by Jin Yong

Hong Qi
- Condor Trilogy character
- Hong Qigong in the 2021 mobile game The Legend of the Condor Heroes
- Created by: Jin Yong

In-universe information
- Nicknames: "Northern Beggar"; "Nine-Fingered Divine Beggar"; "Old Beggar"
- Gender: Male
- Affiliation: Beggar Clan
- Apprentices: Guo Jing; Huang Rong

Hong Qigong
- Chinese: 洪七公
Transcriptions
Standard Mandarin
- Hanyu Pinyin: Hóng Qīgōng
Yue: Cantonese
- Jyutping: Hung^{4} Cat^{1}-gung^{1}

Hong Qi, better known as Hong Qigong (洪七公), (Note: The gong is an honorific suffix similar to "Lord" or "Sir", and is not part of his name. His apprentices, followers and younger generations call him "Qigong" ("Lord Qi") to show their respect for him as an elder and their affection for him as a venerable figure.) and also known as Count Seven Hong in the St. Martin's translation, is a fictional character in the wuxia novel The Legend of the Condor Heroes and its sequel, The Return of the Condor Heroes, by Jin Yong. Best known for his most powerful skills – the Eighteen Dragon-Subduing Palms and the Dog Beating Staff Technique – Hong Qigong is the chief of the Beggar Clan and one of the "Five Greats", the five most powerful martial artists in the wulin (martial artists' community) of his time. He plays a significant role in the first novel by imparting his skills to the protagonists, Guo Jing and Huang Rong. Huang Rong also succeeds him as the Beggar Clan's chief. In the second novel, he makes a brief appearance and teaches the protagonist, Yang Guo, the Dog Beating Staff Technique before dying together with his old rival, Ouyang Feng.

== Fictional character biography ==
Hong Qigong was formerly a slave of an aristocratic family in the Jin Empire before he escaped, joined the Beggar Clan, and eventually became its chief. He is nicknamed "Northern Beggar" (北丐) after emerging as one of the top five champions of a martial arts contest on Mount Hua, and is also known as the "Nine-Fingered Divine Beggar" (九指神丐) after he cut off his right forefinger in remorse for failing a mission, which cost a man's life, due to his gluttony.

Hong Qigong makes his first appearance when Huang Rong is preparing beggar's chicken for Guo Jing. Attracted to the fragrant aroma, he asks to taste it. Huang Rong examines his physical appearance, notices his missing finger and Dog Beating Staff, and deduces his identity. She then makes a deal with Hong Qigong for him to train Guo Jing in martial arts; in return, she will prepare fine cuisine for him. Hong Qigong agrees and teaches Guo Jing the Eighteen Dragon-Subduing Palms.

Hong Qigong later loses all his neigong when he uses it to purge venom from his body after he has been poisoned by "Western Venom" Ouyang Feng, also one of the "Five Greats". He decides to pass his position as chief of the Beggar Clan to Huang Rong so he teaches her the Dog Beating Staff Technique, a skill passed down only from the Beggar Clan's current chief to his/her successor.

Hong Qigong makes a brief appearance in The Return of the Condor Heroes while roaming around as a carefree old beggar in search of culinary delights. He has regained his neigong at this point in time after practising healing techniques from the Jiuyin Zhenjing. On Mount Hua, he encounters the protagonist Yang Guo and Ouyang Feng, who has become insane but still retains his combat prowess. Hong Qigong fights with Ouyang Feng to the point of sheer exhaustion, but neither of them is willing to back down, so they use Yang Guo as an intermediary by teaching him their respective skills and asking him to perform the skills for the other to see. During this time, Yang Guo learns the Dog Beating Staff Technique from Hong Qigong. Eventually, both Hong Qigong and Ouyang Feng realise that neither of them can win the other so they give up and die together in the midst of laughter and forgotten past feuds. Yang Guo then buries them beside each other on Mount Hua.

== Martial arts and skills ==
Hong Qigong is best known for his formidable qinggong and his two most powerful skills – the Eighteen Dragon-Subduing Palms (降龍十八掌) and Dog Beating Staff Technique (打狗棒法). In his younger days, he created a skill called Carefree Fist (逍遙遊), which looks graceful and elegant but lacks real power. He also invented a dart-throwing technique called Rain of Petals (滿天花雨) to counter Ouyang Ke's snake formation by using sewing needles to pin down the snakes.

== In adaptations ==
Notable actors who have portrayed Hong Qigong in films and television series include Ku Feng (1977–1978, 1983), Lau Dan (1983, 1994–1995), Chiang Sheng (1988), Lau Kong (1993), Jacky Cheung (1993–1994), Marco Ngai (1994), Bryan Leung (1998, 2008), Sun Haiying (2003), Yin Xiaotian (2014–2015), Zhao Lixin (2017), Yue Dongfeng (2021), Ming Dao (2024) and Hu Jun (2025).
