= List of Hong Kong films of 1978 =

A list of films produced in Hong Kong in 1978:

== 1978 ==
Title	Director	Cast	Genre	Notes
1978
5 Superfighters	Lo Mar	Hau Chiu Sing	Martial arts	
7 Grandmasters	Joseph Kuo	Li Yi Min, Jack Long, Alan Chui Chung-San	Martial arts	
18 Fatal Strikes	Yeung Jing Chan			
The 36th Chamber of Shaolin	Lau Kar-Leung	Gordon Liu	Martial arts	
Amsterdam Connection	Fan Mei Sheng			
The Amsterdam Kill	Robert Clouse			
Assassinators	Bolo Hsieh Li			
Assault of Final Rival	Lee Siu			
Avenging Eagle	Sun Chung			
Bank Busters	He Chi Chiang			
Big Land, Flying Eagles	Ulysses Au-Yeung Jun			
Big Leap Forward				
Black Society	Wong Man			
Born Invincible	Joseph Kuo Nam Hung	Carter Wong, Mark Long, Jack Long		
Boxer's Adventure			Martial arts	
The Boys in Company "C"				About the United States Marines in the Vietnam War
Warriors Two	Sammo Hung	Bryan Leung Kar Yan, Casanova Wong, Sammo Hung	Martial arts	

Title	Director	Cast	Genre	Notes
The Brave Archer 2	Chang Cheh			
Bruce And Shaolin Kung Fu	Joseph Kong Hung			
Bruce And Shaolin Kung Fu 2	James Nam			
Bruce Lee - The Invincible	Law Gei Sek			
Bruce Le's Greatest Revenge	Do Liu Boh			
Bruce Li In New Guinea	Joseph Kong Hung			
Bruce Li's Magnum Fist	Hon Bo Cheung			
By Hook And By Crook	Cheung Sam, Simon Chui Yee Ang			
Call Me Dragon	Ng See Yuen	Bruce Liang		
Challenge of Death	Lee Tso Nam			
The Chase	John Law			
Circle of Iron	Richard Moore			
Clan of Amazons	Chu Yuan			
Conflict				
The Contract	Michael Hui			
Crazy Imposters	Kuei Chih Hung			
Crippled Avengers	Chang Cheh			
The Cunning Hustler	Huang Feng			
Cunning Tendency				
The Damned	Kao Pao-shu			
Deadly Silver Spear				
Deadly Strike	Wong Fei Lung			
The Deadly Sword	Godfrey Ho			
Death Duel of the Mantis	Gwok Ching Kong			
Delinquent Teenagers	Lui Kei			
The Delivery	Chui Daai Chuen			
The Demons in the Flame Mountain	Tyrone Hsu			
Dirty Kung Fu	Lau Kar Wing			
Dirty Tiger, Crazy Frog	Karl Maka	Sammo Hung		
The Divine Martial Arts of Dharma	Lee Hyeok Su			
Dog Bites Dog Bone	Michael Lai			
Double Cross	Chung Gwok Yan			
Dragon Lee vs. The 5 Brothers	Kim Si Hyeon	Dragon Lee, Kim Ki Joo, Hung Sing Chung		
Dragon of the Swordsman				
Dragon, The Young Master	Kim Si Hyeon	Dragon Lee		
Dream of the Red Chamber	Chin Han			
Drunken Master	Yuen Woo Ping	Jackie Chan, Yuen Siu Tien, Hwang Jang Lee	Action / Kung fu / Comedy	
Dual Flying Kicks	Chan Sing			
Duel at Tiger Village	Pao Hsueh Lieh			
Duel of the Brave Ones	Wai Man			
Dynamo	Wa Yat Wang	Bruce Li		
Eagle's Claw	Lee Tso Nam			
Edge of Fury	Lee Tso Nam			
The Eighteen Jade Arhats	Cheung Git			
Enter the Deadly Dragon				
Enter the Fat Dragon	Sammo Hung	Sammo Hung, Bryan Leung		
Enter the Game of Death	Lee Tso Nam	Bruce Le		
Erotic Dream of the Red Chamber	Gam Yam			
Everywhere Birds Are Singing	Lau Wai Ban			
The Extras	Yim Ho			
Fatal Needles vs. Fatal Fists	Lee Tso			
Fearless Duo	Fong Cheung			
Fearless Kung Fu Elements				
Filthy Guy	Gam Yung, Tyrone Hsu Tin Wing			
Five Elements of Kung Fu	Mo Man Hung			
The Five Venoms	Chang Cheh			
The Flower, The Killer	Sun Yung			
Flying Guillotine 2	Ching Gong, Hua Shan			
Follow the Star	John Woo			
For Whom To Be Murdered	Patrick Yuen Ho Chuen			
Funny Kung Fu				
The Game of Death	Bruce Lee, Robert Clouse	Bruce Lee, Kim Tai Chung, Gig Young, Dean Jagger, Colleen Camp, Kareem Abdul-Jabbar, Hugh O'Brian, James Tien, Casanova Wong, Sammo Hung, Yuen Biao, Bob Wall, Roy Chiao, Ji Han Jae		
Gang of Four	Hua Shan			
The Giants				
Godfather's Fury	Sun Chung			
The Gold Dagger Romance	Tsui Hark			
The Golden Key	Zhu Mu			
The Good, the Bad And The Beauties	Wong Tin-Lam	Lam Kam-Tong, Pak Yan, Che Yue, Yu Miu-Lin, Cheng Man-Ha, Tang Mei-Mei	Drama	
Goose Boxer				
The Gory Murder				
Grandmaster of Shaolin Kung Fu	Godfrey Ho			
Great General	Ting Chung			
Green Jade Statuette	Lee Tso Nam			
The Guardian	Chui Hon Cheung			
Half a Loaf of Kung Fu	Chan Chi Hwa	Jackie Chan	Kung fu	
Heaven Sword and Dragon Sabre, Part I	Chu Yuan			
Heaven Sword and Dragon Sabre, Part II	Chu Yuan			
Hello, Sexy Late Homecomers				
Hello, Late Homecomers	Louis Lau Tin Chi, Louis Sit Chi Hung, John Woo			
The Hero Tattooed With Nine Dragons	Pao Hsueh Lieh			
Heroes of the East	Lau Kar Leung			
The Heroic Defenders	Chiang Han, Jue Fung			
A Hero's Tears	Li Chao Yung			
Horses				
The Invincible Killer	Leong Sum	Michael Chan Wai-Man, Tang Ching, Terry Lau Wai-Yue, Lau Nga-Ying, Wong Man-Yee		
The Invincible Kung Fu Trio	Joe Law Chi			
Invincible Monkey Fist	Chen Kuan Tai			
Invincible Shaolin	Chang Cheh			
Island of Virgins	Hua Shan			
It's Sunset Again				
Magnificent Bodyguards	Lo Wei	Jackie Chan, James Tien, Leung Siu-Lung	Action / Kung fu	
Mr. Funny Bone Strikes Again	Wong Fung	Wang Sha, Aai Dung-Gwa, Lau Luk-Wah, Fan Lei, Nancy Liang Lan-Si	Comedy	
Snake & Crane Arts of Shaolin	Chen Chi Hwa	Jackie Chan, Nora Miao	Action / Adventure / Kung fu	
Snake in the Eagle's Shadow	Yuen Woo-ping	Jackie Chan, Yuen Siu Tien, Hwang Jang Lee, Dean Shek	Action / Kung fu / Comedy	
Spiritual Kung Fu	Lo Wei	Jackie Chan, James Tien, Dean Shek, Yuen Biao	Action / Adventure / Kung fu	
