= Venom Mob =

Group of Chinese martial arts actors

The Venom Mob is a colloquial title given to a group of actors from the Shaw Brothers Studio who attained international prominence for their lead roles in the 1978 film Five Deadly Venoms. Its members consisted of Lu Feng, Chiang Sheng, Philip Kwok, Sun Chien, Lo Mang, and Wai Pak. Although the main cast have never referred to themselves as the Venom Mob, they have continued to be referred to as such in English-speaking media while English DVD versions of their films often introduced them collectively as The Venoms.

Prior their entry into the Hong Kong film industry, many members had attended Peking opera schools in Taiwan before being recruited by director Chang Cheh. They were cast in Five Deadly Venoms by Chang and screenwriter Ni Kuang to bring in and cultivate the next generation of actors into the martial arts genre. The group was active between 1978 and 1981 and made several films together following the success of their first picture. (Note: At that time, Venom Mob was considered the successor to a popular group of Shaw Brothers martial arts stars known as "The Fantastic Four" (formed by Alexander Fu Sheng, Chen Kuan-tai, David Chiang and Ti Lung), who, like the Venom Mob were also discovered and recruited by Chang Cheh and considered the four main stars of the Shaw Brothers in the 1970s (due to the fact that the four were the protagonists of most Shaw Brothers films in the 70s, they ended up becoming known as "The Fantastic Four" or "The Four Pillars of Shaw Brothers").)

The group disbanded in 1981 with the split being attributed to reasons such as the declining popularity of martial arts films in Hong Kong and Taiwan, changing audience preferences, and Chang Cheh's shift to the Mainland Chinese market.

== Roster ==
The main five (though there are six, Chiang Sheng is actually the fifth member of the Venoms, not Wei Pai, who only appeared in four films with the others).

| Role | Performer | a.k.a. | Background |
|---|---|---|---|
| Hero | Philip Kwok | No. 4 Lizard | Usually played the lead hero and was the last man standing with the exception of four films. An acrobat and stuntman recruited by Liu Chia-Liang in Taiwan (after appearing in Wang Yu's Master of the Flying Guillotine fighting Liu Chia-Yung) for Chang's 1975 film Marco Polo. This was followed by cameos in The Fantastic Magic Baby, The Boxer Rebellion, New Shaolin Boxer and The Magnificent Wanderers. His directorial debut was Ruthless Tactics in 1983. He did have one villainous role, that of the White Dragons crime boss in The Chinatown Kid (1977) opposite the late Hong Kong actor Alexander Fu Sheng. |
| Villain | Lu Feng | No. 1 Centipede | A weapons expert and usually cast as the villain, he received very few heroic roles. Chu Lu Feng was also recruited in Taiwan and began his small bit parts in films, such as The 7 Man Army, Shaolin Avengers, New Shaolin Boxers and The Chinatown Kid. He was one of the titular The Naval Commandos before cementing his reputation as a villain in both Heaven and Hell and Shaolin Temple. He is the only one of the actors to receive a credit as a "Fighting Instructor" on The Five Venoms. |
| Hero | Chiang Sheng | The Student | Known for his acrobatic ability, he was usually cast as a supporting hero to Philip Kwok but later films would see him cast in various villainous parts. His on-screen debut was a comedic flashback with Lu Feng in the opening act of Shaolin Avengers, followed The Brave Archer and The Chinatown Kid. Official debut films were The Naval Commandos and Shaolin Temple filmed back-to-back. Was also Chang Cheh's assistant director on several films. These three formed an ensemble that would remain together after departing from Shaw in films such as Ruthless Tactics (a.k.a. Ninja in the Deadly Trap) and Fight Among the Supers. Chiang Sheng died in 1991 of a heart attack after a divorce and alcohol abuse. |
| Hero/Villain | Sun Chien | No. 3 Scorpion | Primarily known for his kicking ability, and played various hero and villain roles. Sun Chien was a Taiwanese actor and Tae Kwon Do expert, recruited by Chang Cheh for Chinatown Kid to play opposite Fu Sheng. Sun Chien also worked for directors Sun Chung (Human Lanterns), Chu Yuan (Spirit of the Sword), and Liu Chia-Liang (The Lady is the Boss) among others. His Taekwondo skills earned him a nickname "Korean kicker", despite the fact of being Taiwanese, owing to his martial arts' origin. Chien departed for a short period of time but made his return to the group in House of Traps. |
| Hero/Villain | Lo Mang | No. 5 Toad | Known for his physique and physical strength, he usually was the first one to get killed. He did, however, survive in two films (Crippled Avengers and Invincible Shaolin). Lo Mang also played various hero and villain roles. Was an accountant at Chang Cheh Film Co. in Taiwan who studied Mantis for years before landing bit roles in Shaolin Temple and The Brave Archer. This led to a trio of modern-day parts showcasing his physique in The Chinatown Kid, Heaven and Hell, as well as Deadly Strike (a.k.a. "Soul Brothers Of Kung-Fu") for Shaw's satellite company Eternal Films. Afterwards, he returned to the Brave Archer series in an expanded role as "The Iron Palm" before starring as "The Toad #5" in The Five Venoms, one of his signature roles (the other being Kid with the Golden Arm the following year). |
| Hero/Villain | Wei Pai | No. 2 Snake | Did not star in many films with the previous five. He did not possess the same fighting skills as the rest of the group and preferred drama to action. In addition to The Five Venoms, Wei Pai only starred in Chang Cheh's Invincible Shaolin, Ten Tigers Of Kwangtung (which was shelved for a year due to Fu Sheng's injuries, hence the 1980 release date), Kid with the Golden Arm and a flashback sequence in The Brave Archer Part 2. He defected to Golden Harvest and starred in Chang Cheh protégé John Woo's Last Hurrah for Chivalry the following year. |

=== Supporting actors ===
- Wang Lung Wei – a villain in several early Venom films. Made his debut in Chang Cheh's Shaolin Martial Arts, filmed in Taiwan during 1974.
- Wang Li – appeared in later Venom films replacing Wei Pai, usually as a villain. Wang Li was also recruited in Taiwan and appeared in bit parts in New Shaolin Boxers and Chinatown Kid before his official debut in Shaolin Rescuers
- Sun Shu-Pei – usually a villain with minimal fighting skills whose only heroic role was as "Long Axe" in Kid with the Golden Arm.
- Yang Hsiung – appeared throughout Chang Cheh's Venom cycle of films in various heroic and villainous roles.
- Lau Shi Kwong – another actor usually cast as the cowardly type with minimal martial arts ability, best remembered as the snitch Wong Fa in Five Deadly Venoms and as "The Dangerous Kid" in Flag Of Iron.
- Cheng Tien-Chi – another graduate of Peking opera, Cheng made his debut in The Brave Archer 3, followed by House Of Traps and Ode to Gallantry. He would later star in lead roles in Five Elements Ninjas, The Weird Man and The Nine Demons.
- Chu Ko – also debuted in The Brave Archer 3 and continued into the 1980s replacing Sun Chien, usually as an insidious villain and some occasional heroic rolls.
- Lung Tien-Sheng – usually cast as misguided anti-hero, such as 'The Spearman' in Flag of Iron and 'Golden Snake Xia Xueyi' in Sword Stained with Royal Blood
- Wen Hsueh-Erh – Lead female in several later Venom films. Excels at playing spoiled brat roles or the love interest of one of the main heros.
- Yu Tai Ping – The lead henchman in earlier Venom films, would later switch sides during 1981's Flag Of Iron (literally) as his appearances afterwards were usually of the second-tier heroic nature in the films.
- Tony Tam Jan Dung – A henchman and usually partnered with Yu Tai Ping, Yang Hsuing or Lau Shi Kwong and serves under Lu Feng's character. He was usually seen as a character in background before becoming a top henchman in Crippled Avengers.
- Chin Siu-Ho – First appeared in small role in The Rebel Intruders prior to making his official credited debut in 2 Champions Of Shaolin. Proceeded to co-star in Ten Tigers of Kwangtung, Legend of the Fox and Masked Avengers among others, in addition to films for other directors at Shaw after Chang Cheh's cohorts disbanded.

== Venom films ==
Films directed by Chang Cheh (or a Venom) that feature at least three Venoms in starring roles.

| Original H.K. English Title | Production company | Original H.K. Release Date | Alternate English Titles | participating Venoms |
|---|---|---|---|---|
| The Five Venoms | Shaw Brothers | 12 August 1978 | The 5 Deadly Venoms; Shaolin Deadly Poisons; Five Deadly Venoms | Lu Feng, Chiang Sheng, Philip Kwok, Sun Chien, Lo Mang, Wai Pak |
| Invincible Shaolin | Shaw Brothers | 19 November 1978 | The Unbeatable Dragon | Lu Feng, Chiang Sheng, Philip Kwok, Sun Chien, Lo Mang, Wai Pak |
| Crippled Avengers | Shaw Brothers | 21 December 1978 | Mortal Combat; Return of the Five Deadly Venoms; The Return of the 5 Deadly Venoms | Lu Feng, Chiang Sheng, Philip Kwok, Sun Chien, Lo Mang |
| Life Gamble | Shaw Brothers | 22 February 1979 | Life Combat | Lu Feng, Chiang Sheng, Philip Kwok, Lo Mang |
| Shaolin Rescuers | Shaw Brothers | 24 March 1979 | Avenging Warriors of Shaolin | Lu Feng, Chiang Sheng, Philip Kwok, Sun Chien, Lo Mang |
| Shaolin Daredevils | Shaw Brothers | 29 June 1979 | The Daredevils | Lu Feng, Chiang Sheng, Philip Kwok, Sun Chien, Lo Mang |
| Magnificent Ruffians | Shaw Brothers | 20 September 1979 | The Destroyers | Lu Feng, Chiang Sheng, Philip Kwok, Sun Chien, Lo Mang |
| Kid with the Golden Arm | Shaw Brothers | 2 November 1979 | Kid with the Golden Arms | Lu Feng, Chiang Sheng, Philip Kwok, Sun Chien, Lo Mang, Wai Pak |
| Heaven and Hell | Shaw Brothers | 19 January 1980 | Shaolin Hell Gate | Lu Feng, Chiang Sheng, Lo Mang |
| 2 Champions of Shaolin | Shaw Brothers | 12 April 1980 | Two Champions of Death; 2 Champions of Death | Lu Feng, Chiang Sheng, Sun Chien, Lo Mang |
| Flag of Iron | Shaw Brothers | 14 August 1980 | Spearman; The Spearman of Death | Lu Feng, Chiang Sheng, Philip Kwok |
| The Rebel Intruders | Shaw Brothers | 10 September 1980 | Killer Army | Lu Feng, Chiang Sheng, Philip Kwok, Sun Chien, Lo Mang |
| Legend of the Fox | Shaw Brothers | 15 November 1980 | | Lu Feng, Chiang Sheng, Philip Kwok |
| Ten Tigers of Kwangtung | Shaw Brothers | 20 December 1980 | 10 Tigers of Kwangtung; Ten Tigers from Kwangtung | Lu Feng, Chiang Sheng, Philip Kwok, Sun Chien, Lo Mang, Wai Pak |
| Sword Stained with Royal Blood | Shaw Brothers | 6 March 1981 | | Lu Feng, Chiang Sheng, Philip Kwok |
| Masked Avengers | Shaw Brothers | 15 May 1981 | | Lu Feng, Chiang Sheng, Philip Kwok |
| Ruthless Tactics | Yu Feng Film Company | 1981 | Ninja in the Deadly Trap; Ninja's Deadly Trap | Lu Feng, Chiang Sheng, Philip Kwok |
| House of Traps | Shaw Brothers | 9 January | | Lu Feng, Chiang Sheng, Philip Kwok, Sun Chien |
| Ode to Gallantry | Shaw Brothers | 16 December 1982 | | Chiang Sheng, Philip Kwok, Sun Chien |

== Venom-related films ==
Films directed by Chang Cheh that feature Venoms in supporting roles or fewer than three Venoms in starring roles.

| Original H.K. English Title | Production company | Original H.K. Release Date | Alternate English Titles | participating Venoms |
|---|---|---|---|---|
| Marco Polo | Shaw Brothers | 25 December 1975 | The Four Assassins | Lu Feng, Philip Kwok |
| Shaolin Temple | Shaw Brothers | 22 December 1976 | Death Chamber, Death Chambers | Chiang Sheng, Lo Mang, Wai Pak |
| The Naval Commandos | Shaw Brothers | 7 April 1977 | | Lu Feng, Chiang Sheng |
| The Brave Archer | Shaw Brothers | 30 July 1977 | Kung-Fu Warlords | Lu Feng, Philip Kwok, Lo Mang, Chiang Sheng |
| Chinatown Kid | Shaw Brothers | 2 December 1977 | | Lu Feng, Chiang Sheng, Philip Kwok, Sun Chien, Lo Mang |
| The Brave Archer 2 | Shaw Brothers | 5/13/78 | Kung-Fu Warlords Part II | Lu Feng, Chiang Sheng, Philip Kwok, Lo Mang |
| The Brave Archer 3 | Shaw Brothers | 11/12/81 | Blast of the Iron Palm | Lu Feng, Chiang Sheng, Philip Kwok, Sun Chien, Lo Mang |
| The Brave Archer and His Mate | Shaw Brothers | 25 February 1982 | The Brave Archer Part 4, Kung Fu Warlord 4 | Lu Feng, Chiang Sheng, Philip Kwok |
| Five Elements Ninjas | Shaw Brothers | 21 April 1982 | Five Element Ninjas, Super Ninjas, Chinese Super Ninjas, Chinese Super Ninja | Lo Mang |
| The Weird Man | Shaw Brothers | 1983 | | Philip Kwok |
| Attack of the Joyful Goddess | Hong Kong Chang He Motion Picture Co., Ltd. | 3 October 1983 | Attack of the Venoms, Five Venoms Attack | Lu Feng, Chiang Sheng |
| Death Ring | Hong Kong Chang He Motion Picture Co., Ltd. | 1983 | | Lu Feng |
| The Nine Demons | Hong Kong Chang He Motion Picture Co., Ltd. | 1984 | The 9 Venoms, Nine Venoms | Lu Feng, Chiang Sheng |
| Shanghai 13 | Winners' Workshop Production Co., Ltd. | 1984 | The Shanghai Thirteen | Lu Feng, Chiang Sheng |

== See also ==
- Cinema of Hong Kong
- Hong Kong action cinema
- Shaw Brothers Studio
