= Chiang Sheng =

Taiwanese martial arts actor and director (1951–1991)

江生 Chiang Sheng
- Born: 趙岡生 (Chiu Kang Sang); April 27, 1951; Taiwan
- Died: August 18, 1991 (aged 40); Taipei, Taiwan
- Other names: Kong Sang; Chiu Gong-Sang; Chao Gang-Sheng; Chao Kang-Sheng; Chiang Shang; Chiu Kang-Seng; Kwong Sang; Chao Kon-Sen; Jiang Sheng; Cutie Pie
- Occupations: Actor, action director, director
- Years active: 1973-1989

Chinese name
- Simplified Chinese: 江生
Transcriptions
Standard Mandarin
- Hanyu Pinyin: jiang1 sheng1
Yue: Cantonese
- Jyutping: gong1 saang1

Chiang Sheng (Chinese: 江生; born Chiu Kang Sang 趙岡生; 21 November 1954 - 18 April 1990) was a Taiwanese martial arts actor, director, and action director. Chiang rose to prominence in the late 1970s as a member of the Venom Mob, a group of actors at Shaw Brothers Studio renowned for their acrobatic and martial arts skills.

== Early life ==
Chiang Sheng was born on April 27, 1951, to a large family in Taiwan. He was sent to the Fu Sheng Drama School in Taipei where he met his future costars Lu Feng, Philip Kwok, and Robert Tai. They, together with students from other drama schools, earned pocket money playing extras in films that were being shot nearby. In addition to being trained as a martial arts opera performer, Chiang was also enlisted in the army. When he was 19, Chiang and Kwok briefly worked as street performers dubbed the Fu Xing circus act. He was fond of drinking.

== Career ==
In 1975, Chiang was recruited by Chang Cheh along with Kwok and Lu and signed with the Shaw Brothers. He relocated to Hong Kong where he was predominantly cast as extras in films such as Shaolin Traitorous with Sammo Hung before landing a more prominent role in Shaolin Temple in 1976. In 1978, Chiang, Kwok, Lu, along with fellow newcomers Sun Chien, Lo Mang, and Wai Pak, were cast in Five Deadly Venoms. The movie was a cult hit and became especially popular with North American audiences. The main cast became known internationally as the Venom Mob, with Chiang often being referred to as the "hybrid venom" due to the fighting style of his character being an amalgamation of his costars'. The Venom Mob would go on to make several films together such as The Magnificent Ruffians (1979), Shaolin Rescuers (1979), and Ten Tigers of Kwantung (1980) before disbanding in 1981. In addition to acting, Chiang worked as action director and assistant director in several of his films, for which he is credited in a combined total of over 40 films from 1978 to 1984. He was further lauded for enriching his movies with his acrobatic skills and for infusing action with comedic elements. He was also listed by Chang Cheh as one of his favorite actors to work with.

== Later life ==
Following the disbandment of the Venom Mob, Chiang returned to Taiwan and starred in, directed, and choreographed the action scenes in Ninja in the Deadly Trap (1982) with Venom costars Lu Feng and Philip Kwok. Kwok later returned to the Shaw Brothers Studio in Hong Kong while Chiang remained in Taiwan, reportedly at his wife's behest. He would cofound Hong Kong Chang He Film Company with Lu and the duo would star in and choreograph the company's debut film, Attack of the Joyful Goddess (1983). Throughout the later half of the decade, Chiang went on to make a few movies and television series including Ode to Gallantry (1985) and The Legend of the Condor Heroes (1988). During this time, he divorced his wife and developed depression and a heavy alcohol addiction as he struggled to find work. The 1989 film, The Biography of a Fox, was his final film role.

== Death ==
Chiang's body was discovered by friend and costar Ricky Cheng Tien-Chi on August 21, 1991. The cause of death was a heart attack. Chiang was 40 years old. In a 1995 interview, Philip Kwok stated that Chiang had been dead for three days before Cheng found him, and attributed the cause as "a broken heart" induced by the drastic decline of his film career. However, actor and student of Robert Tai, Toby Russell suggested otherwise stating in 2007 that "Chiang could not care less about movies" and that they "mean nothing to him". Lu Feng described his passing as a "great sadness" and remembered him as a jovial person who "had no temper and held no grudges" and "could get along with anyone he met."

== Filmography ==
Title	Year	Role
Fist of Shaolin	1973	Extra
Wild Tiger a.k.a. Kung Fu Revenger	1973	Extra
The Champion	1973	Extra
The Escaper	1973	Extra
Fury in Storm	1974	Extra
Bruce Takes Dragon Town a.k.a. Dare You Touch Me?	1974	Extra
The Guy!! The Guy!!	1974	Extra
Crazy Nuts of Kung Fu	1974	Actor
Fury in Storm	1974	Extra
18 Shaolin Disciples	1975	Actor
Shaolin Traitorous a.k.a. The Traitorous	1976	Extra
The Hand of Deatha.k.a. Grandmaster of Death a.k.a. Strike of Death	1976	Extra
Shaolin Monk	1976	Actor
The Shaolin Avengers a.k.a. Incredible Kung Fu Brothers	1976	Actor
Shaolin Temple a.k.a. Death Chambers	1976	Actor
New Shaolin Boxers a.k.a. Demon Fist of Kung Fu a.k.a. Grandmaster of Death	1976	Actor
The Condemned	1976	Extra
Chinese Connection 2 a.k.a. Fist of Fury 2	1977	Extra
The Naval Commandos a.k.a. Navy Descentors	1977	Actor
The Brave Archer a.k.a. Kung Fu Warlord	1977	Actor
Chinatown Kid	1977	Actor
Magnificent Wanderers a.k.a. Magnificent Kung Fu Warriors	1977	Actor
The Brave Archer 2 a.k.a. Kung Fu Warlord 2	1978	Actor, assistant director
Invincible Shaolin a.k.a. Unbeatable Dragon	1978	Actor, assistant director
Crippled Avengers a.k.a. Avengers Handicapped	1978	Actor, assistant director, action director
The Five Venoms	1978	Actor, assistant director
Life Gamble a.k.a. Life Combat	1979	Actor, assistant director
Ten Tigers of Kwantung	1979	Actor, assistant director, action director
The Magnificent Ruffians a.k.a. The Destroyers	1979	Actor, assistant director, action director
Kid with the Golden Arm	1979	Actor, assistant director, action director
Shaolin Rescuers a.k.a. Avenging Warriors of Shaolin	1979	Actor, assistant director, action director
The Daredevils a.k.a. Shaolin Daredevils	1979	Actor, assistant director, action director
Heaven and Hell a.k.a. Shaolin Hell Gate	1980	Actor, action director
Legend of the Fox	1980	Actor, assistant director, action director
The Rebel Intruders a.k.a. Killer Army	1980	Actor, assistant director, action director
Two Champions of Shaolin	1980	Actor, assistant director, action director
War of the Shaolin Temple a.k.a. Monks Go Crazy	1980	Actor
The Flag of Iron a.k.a. Spearmen of Death	1980	Actor, assistant director, action director
Masked Avengers	1981	Actor, assistant director, action director
The Brave Archer 3 (1981) a.k.a. Blast of the Iron Palm	1981	Actor, assistant director, action director
The Imperial Sword Killing the Devil	1981	Actor, action director
The Thrilling Sword (1981) a.k.a. Heaven Sword	1981	Actor, action director
Ninja in the Deadly Trap a.k.a. Hero Defeating Japs a.k.a. Ruthless Tactics	1981	Actor, assistant director, action director
Sword Stained with Royal Blood	1981	Actor, assistant director, action director
The Brave Archer and His Mate a.k.a. Mysterious Island	1982	Actor, assistant director, action director
Ode to Gallantry	1982	Actor, assistant director, action director
Ninja Kids	1982	Actor
House of Traps	1982	Actor, assistant director, action director
Raiders	1982	Actor
Sword with the Windbell a.k.a. Warriors from Shaolin	1983	Actor
Attack of the Joyful Goddess a.k.a. The Ghost	1983	Actor, assistant director, action director
Five Fighters from Shaolin a.k.a. Possession of Ghost	1984	Actor
Shanghai 13 a.k.a. All the Professionals	1984	Actor, assistant director, action director
Fight Among the Supers	1984	Actor
The Demons a.k.a. The Nine Demons	1984	Actor, executive director, actor, action director
Exciting Dragon a.k.a. Drunken Dragon	1985	Actor
Ninja in USA	1985	Actor
Ode to Gallantry	1985	Actor
Vampire Kid II	1988	Actor
The Legend of the Condor Heroes	1988	Actor
The Biography of a Fox	1989	Actor

== See also ==
- Chang Cheh
- Venom Mob
