= Lu Feng (actor) =

Taiwanese film director and actor

- Chinese: 鹿峯
- Born: Chu Qi Xue; April 3, 1956 (age 70); Taipei, Taiwan
- Other names: Chue Luk-Fung; Chu Lu-Feng; Lu Chu-Feng; Luk Fung; Chu Luk-Wa; Luh Feng; Lu Fong; Luther Chu; Cola King
- Occupations: Actor, action director, director
- Years active: 1975–present
- Spouse: Lily Sun
- Children: 1
- Awards: Asia-Pacific Film Festival; Best Supporting Actor; 1979 Shaolin Rescuers The Urban Action Showcase and Expo; 2017 Urban Fists of Legends Legacy Award; The Martial Arts Cult Classic Cinema Award; 2017 Five Deadly Venoms

Chinese name
- Traditional Chinese: 鹿峯
- Simplified Chinese: 鹿峰
Transcriptions
Standard Mandarin
- Hanyu Pinyin: Lù Fēng
Yue: Cantonese
- Jyutping: Luk6 Fung1

Lu Feng (born April 3, 1956) is a Taiwanese-born Hong Kong-based martial artist actor, action choreographer, and director. Lu gained international prominence in 1978 for starring in the Shaw Brothers film Five Deadly Venoms, earning him and the rest of the cast the collective moniker of Venom Mob. He was part of Chang Cheh's ensemble of fourth generation actors along with Chiang Sheng, Philip Kwok, Lo Mang, and Sun Chien.

== Early life ==
Lu was born Chu Qi Xue on April 3, 1956, in Taipei, Taiwan. His ancestral roots can be traced back to Anhui Province in Mainland China. The youngest of four sons, Lu grew up idolizing martial arts actor Chen Kuan-tai. At age 8, he was sent to the government-run Junior Lu Guang Drama School by his parents, who were struggling to support him and his siblings. There, he studied revolutionary opera with future costar and lifelong friend, Chiang Sheng. Lu, along with Chiang, Philip Kwok, Robert Tai, and Ricky Cheng Tien-Chi would practice acrobatics near Taipei Bridge and earned pocket money playing extras in movies that were shot nearby. In addition to acrobatics, Lu sang, practiced martial arts and somersaults, and became proficient in various weapons. Upon graduating, he had plans to pursue a career in the professional arts but decided on film and television instead, owing to the declining popularity of Chinese opera. An avid drinker of Coca-Cola, Lu's love of the soft drink earned him the nickname Cola King.

== Career ==
Lu was recruited by Chang Cheh in 1975 around the same time the latter relocated his independent film company, Long Bow, to Taiwan. Lu started out as an actor on the set of Shaolin Hellgate and had filmed scenes before the project was shelved and its entire crew recast two years later. Nonetheless, he was noticed by Chang who subsequently promoted him as an actor and in 1976, landed his first major role in Chang's film, Shaolin Temple. In addition to acting, Lu briefly worked as a stuntman in some productions including Ng See-yuen's Secret Rivals 2 (1977), where much of his previous acrobatic training was applied to the action choreography. Following Long Bow's closure in late 1976, Lu, along with Chiang Sheng, Philip Kwok, and several other actors left with Chang who relocated back to the Shaw Brothers Studio in Hong Kong.

In 1978, Lu was cast as Tang Shankui a.k.a. the Centipede in Chang's Five Deadly Venoms where he also served as one of the film's action directors. Lu recalled the experience as "very hard to put together but we had a great time doing it. In retrospect, I have nothing but good memories." Five Deadly Venoms enjoyed commercial success in Hong Kong and Taiwan but especially so in North America where the main cast became collectively known by fans as the Venom Mob. Lu and his cast members, however, did not become aware of the film's international popularity until several years after its release. Following the film's success, Lu frequently starred with the Venom Mob, often in villainous roles. Amongst these films was Shaolin Rescuers (1979) for which his portrayal of the main antagonist Gao Jinzhong won him Best Supporting Actor at the 25th Asia-Pacific Film Festival in Singapore. Lu regards winning the award as the highlight of his acting career and the character remains one of his favorite roles.

The Venom Mob eventually disbanded in 1981. Lu's fellow Venom actor Philip Kwok attributed the split to them simply leaving Shaw's with Chang following suit, while another costar, Lo Mang, believed it was due to audiences no longer wishing to see gory heroics, preferring instead the lighter, more comedic tones of Jackie Chan films. Lu, similarly, was of the opinion that the split was caused by the decline of martial art films in Taiwan and Hong Kong, and because Chang had shifted his focus to the mainland market.

== Later life ==
In 1981, Lu returned to Taiwan where he, along with Venom costars and close friends Philip Kwok and Chiang Sheng made their directional debut in Ninja in the Deadly Trap (1982). Production was fraught with delays and Boxer from Shantung director Pao Hsueh-Li was eventually brought in to ensure its completion. Lu later cofounded Hong Kong Chang He Film Company with Chiang which debuted with the 1983 supernatural film, Attack of the Joyful Goddess. Lu's film appearances decreased after completing Shanghai 13 (1984) as he shifted primarily to television at the suggestion of his childhood friend and fellow Shaw's actor, Ricky Cheng Tien-Chi. He remains active in television where he largely directs or choreographs (sometimes both) TV series from Taiwan or mainland China. His more notable works include New Legend of Madame White Snake (1992), My Fair Princess (1997), Legend of Dagger Li (1999), and Justice Bao (2010).

In 2017, Lu received the Urban Fists of Legends Legacy Award and, to commemorate the 40th anniversary of Five Deadly Venoms, The Martial Arts Cult Classic Cinema Award at The Urban Action Showcase and Expo in New York City. He was honored the following year at the Martial Arts History Museum’s Dragonfest expo in Burbank, California. Lu is attending the November 2026 Urban Action Showcase convention in New York City at Regal Times Square cinemas.

== Personal life ==
Lu is married to Lily Sun with whom he has one son. During the production of New Legend of Madame White Snake, their son (then aged 2) was abducted and nearly trafficked as Lu was alighting at a train station. He was eventually retrieved by a costar, Lu Liang Hui.

== Filmography ==
=== Film ===
Title	Year	Role
Marco Polo	1975	Extra
7-Man Army	1976	Actor
The Condemned	1976	Extra
The Shaolin Avengers	1976	Extra
The Hand of Death	1976	Extra
The Traitorous	1976	Extra
The New Shaolin Boxers	1976	Actor
Shaolin Temple	1976	Actor
The Naval Commandos	1977	Actor
Secret Rivals 2	1977	Extra
Magnificent Wanderers	1977	Extra
The Brave Archer	1977	Actor
Chinatown Kid	1977	Extra
The Brave Archer 2	1978	Actor, action director
Five Deadly Venoms	1978	Actor, action director
Invincible Shaolin	1978	Actor, action director
Crippled Avengers	1978	Actor, action director
Life Gamble	1979	Actor, action director
Shaolin Rescuers	1979	Actor, action director
The Daredevils	1979	Actor, action director
The Magnificent Ruffians	1979	Actor, action director
The Kid with the Golden Arm	1979	Actor, action director
Ten Tigers of Kwangtung	1980	Actor, action director
Shaolin Hellgate	1980	Actor
2 Champions of Shaolin	1980	Actor, action director
The Flag of Iron	1980	Actor, action director
The Rebel Intruders	1980	Actor, action director
Legend of the Fox	1980	Actor, action director
Sword Stained with Royal Blood	1981	Actor, action director
Masked Avengers	1981	Actor, action director
The Brave Archer 3	1981	Extra
House of Traps	1982	Actor, action director
The Brave Archer and His Mate	1982	Actor, action director
Ninja in the Deadly Trap	1982	Actor, action director, director
Ode to Gallantry	1982	Action director
Attack of the Joyful Goddess	1983	Actor, action director, codirector
The Demons	1984	Actor
Shanghai 13	1984	Actor, action director, assistant director
Fight Among the Supers	1984	Actor, action director
Ninja Kids	1984	Actor
Death Ring	1984	Actor, action director, codirector
Ninja, the Violent Sorceror	1987	Actor
Hello Dracula 2	1987	Action director
Ninja Condors	1988	Actor
Vampire Kid II	1988	Actor
The Twelve Fairies	1990	Actor
Mr. Vampire	1990	Actor
Raiders of Loesing Treasure	1992	Actor
Ninja in Ancient China	1993	Actor
Bao Qingtian Zhi Xue Yun Fan Chuanqi	1993	Actor
Fist of Legend 2: Iron Bodyguards	1996	Actor
Yan Gui Zai Ni Zuo You	1997	Actor - uncredited

=== Television ===
Title	Year	Role
Return of the Condor Heroes	1985	Actor
Xin Xi Luo Qi Jian	1985	Actor
Longfeng Qi Xia	1985	Actor
Xianhe Shen Zhen	1985	Actor
Hongfen Zhuren	1985	Actor
Xia You Yuntian	1986	Actor
Shaolin Dizi	1986	Actor
Qi Zhong Qi	1987	Actor
Xi Shi	1987	Actor
Huangjin Kongque Cheng	1987	Actor
Eight Thousand Li of Cloud and Moon	1988	Action director, director
Pili Shen Bu	1988	Actor
Yi Men Yinglie Mu Gui Ying	1989	Actor, action director, director
Taiji Prodigy	1990	Actor, director
Demi-Gods and Semi-Devils	1990	Actor
Li Shi Shi	1990	Actor
The Youthful Swordsman	1990	Actor
San Mao Zai Sheng	1990	Actor
Zhan Dan Sao	1991	Director
The Blood Brothers	1992	Director, producer
Ci Ma	1992	Actor, action director
Liu Bowen Chuanji	1992	Director
New Legend of Madame White Snake	1992	Actor, action director
Tian Shi Zhong Kui	1995	Action director
Guan Gong	1996	Actor
Sui Yang Zhong Hun	1996	Actor, director
My Fair Princess	1997	Action director, director
Shen Yi Hua Tuo	1998	Action director, director
Da Ren Wu	1999	Director
Taiwan Mystery	1999	Actor
Legend of Dagger Li	1999	Actor, director
Gone with the Peach Blossom	2000	Director
San Ge Shao Ye De Jian	2002	Action director
Xiaoli Feidao 2	2002	Director
My Fair Princess 3	2002	Action director
Paishan Daohai - Fan Lihua	2003	Director
Manhan Quanwei	2004	Director
Cannot Live Without You	2005	Director
Jin Yi Wei	2005	Action director
Tie Jiangjun Ah Kui	2006	Director
Da Ming Wang Chao	2006	Action director
Zhuangshi Chuzhen	2007	Director
The Peony Pavilion	2008	Director
Sange Hua Xiang Shou	2010	Action director, director
Justice Bao	2010	Director
Ji Ren Zi You Tian Xiang	2012	Director
Wen Fang Si Bao	2012	Director
Chihou Zhijian	2013	Director
Fuji	2013	Director
Xu Xiang Qian San Zhan Yan Xisha	2014	Director

== See also ==
- Venom Mob
