= Ruthless Tactics =

1981 Hong Kong film by Philip Kwok

Ninja in the Deadly Trap aka Ninjitsu is an independent martial arts film directed by Kuo Chui, starring the main three Venoms (Kuo Chui, Lu Feng, Chiang Sheng) and Ti Lung. The Ninja theme was similar to the popular Shaw Brothers film Five Element Ninjas (with a similar introduction), which starred another Venom member Lo Mang.

== Plot ==
In the 16th century,(In Ming Dynasty Era.) Japanese pirates terrorized the harbors of China for decades until General Chi Ching Kwong masterminded a naval task force to combat the invaders. The oppressive Japanese government sends a contingent of stealth Ninjas to assassinate the General in his palace. His son discovers that these killers have pledged their lives to eradicate his father. Soon Ninja assassins are attacking the General’s soldiers in order to get to him. General Chi Ching Kwong sends his son on a mission to recruit three Chinese anti-Ninjitsu fighters from the elder Master of Three Arts, who owes the General a debt. When the son establishes contact with the Master of Three Arts, the old one informs the General’s son that his three pupils do not know each other’s identity. The General’s son first meets up with the mischievous Chow Chun who he quickly enlists to the cause. Together they recruit the other student, a blacksmith named Tung Yen. Chow Chun and Tung Yen are students of the same master, but don’t know each other and their philosophies cause them to fight playfully. Finally, the contingent adds the missing component to their team, that of weapons specialist, Mao Tin Yeung.

Even as General Chi Ching Kwong’s son and his newfound allies return to the palace, several Ninjas have infiltrated the household disguised as servants. The General’s son then assigns each of his fighters to pose as servants as well, to catch any possible assassination attempts. Chow Chun is assigned to assist in the kitchens, to watch over the staff. He sees the lead cook load a deadly blade onto a tray and try to deliver it to the General for dinner. Chow Chun races out to the serving room and faces off with the Ninja assassin. General Chi Ching Kwong watches as his dinner is interrupted by this life or death battle. Next, one of the guards turns out to be an assassin, and is discovered by Tung Yen and soundly trashed. Mao Tin Yeung uses his wits to determine that the recent hiring of a palace maiden is indeed a female undercover Ninja. When he confronts her, she goes crazy and he is forced to fight her to the death. The leader of the Japanese Ninjas, Shi Ping Wei deploys a plan to kidnap the General’s son to lure the General’s bodyguards away from the palace where he will be unprotected. A band of sneaky Ninjas make off with the son, and hide him away in the nearby gardens. Chow Chun, Tung Yen, and Mao Tin Yeung unite and attempt to rescue the General’s son. Along the way, they are attacked by various bands of Ninja, including Tree Ninjas, Earth Ninjas, Sun Ninja’s. They finally fight their way past the Ninja horde, only to discover the General’s son is the prisoner of the sword-wielding Shi Ping Wei! The heroes must fight their way past this deadly swordmaster and his Ninja disciples if they are to rescue the General’s son...

== Cast ==
- Kuo Chui – Mao Ting Yeung
- Ti Lung – General Chi
- Lu Feng – Tung Yen
- Chiang Sheng – Chow Chun
- Yasuaki Kurata – Shi Ping Wei (or Kanjiro Kazama)
