= Magnificent Ruffians =

1979 Hong Kong film by Chang Cheh

The Magnificent Ruffians
- Video cover

Chinese name
- Traditional Chinese: 賣命小子
- Simplified Chinese: 卖命小子
Transcriptions
Standard Mandarin
- Hanyu Pinyin: Mài Mìng Xiǎo Zǐ
Yue: Cantonese
- Jyutping: Maai6 Ming6 Siu2 Zi2
- Directed by: Chang Cheh
- Screenplay by: Chang Cheh; Ni Kuang
- Produced by: Shaw Brothers
- Starring: Lu Feng; Lo Mang; Sun Chien; Wong Lik; Chiang Sheng; Phillip Kwok
- Cinematography: Cho Wai-Kei
- Edited by: Chiang Hsing-Lung; Lee Yim-Hoi
- Music by: Eddie Wang
- Production company: Shaw Brothers
- Distributed by: Shaw Brothers
- Release date: 1979
- Running time: 106 minutes
- Country: Hong Kong
- Language: Mandarin

The Magnificent Ruffians (alternately titled The Destroyers, Daring Kids, and The Destroyers Of The Five Deadly Venoms) is a 1979 Hong Kong martial arts film directed by Chang Cheh and starring the Venom Mob.

== Plot ==
Yuan Ying Fei (Lu Feng) is a wealthy businessman and renowned martial artist specializing in the golden sword technique. Although he seeks out worthy opponents, the increased Western influence and modernization of the country means the prestige of martial arts and other Chinese traditions have since stagnated, leaving little to no practitioners left to challenge. Those that remained have either been killed by him or were driven out of business and left town. Martial artists He Fei aka Twin Blades (Chiang Sheng), Yang Zhui Feng aka Magic Pole (Phillip Kwok), Feng Jia Ji aka Magnificent Kicks (Sun Chien), and Zeng Qiao aka Sharp Axe (Wong Lik) are amongst those who have lost their jobs and homes to Yuan, and live their daily lives freeloading at local restaurants. They catch Yuan's attention when they use their skills to maneuver through a pit full of traps at one of his restaurants, and are enlisted to harass the remaining merchant escort business in town run by Guan Yun (Lo Mang) and his mother (Wang Lai) and sister Guan San (Annie Liu) into selling their business to him. Yuan's plan backfires however, as all of them share the same outlook on life and instead become friends, practicing kung fu daily and bringing each other food. When he is alerted of their newfound friendship, Yuan decides to set up Yang and secretly places explosives in his pole. During a sparring session, Yang inadvertently sets off the explosives, killing Guan. His friends, thinking he was hired by Yuan to kill him, attack a horrified Yang who runs away. Yuan arrives claiming to take revenge for Guan and kills Feng and Zeng while He escapes. He finds Yang outside the Guan residence whereupon he discovers that Guan's mother and sister have hung themselves, seeing suicide as the only way they can finally be rid from Yuan's torments. He and Yang eventually figure out they had been set up by Yuan and confront him together in a final showdown where they kill him and successfully avenge their friends.

== Cast ==
- Lu Feng as Yuan Ying Fei
- Lo Mang as Guan Yun
- Phillip Kwok as Yang Zhui Feng
- Wong Lik as Zeng Qiao
- Chiang Sheng as He Fei
- Sun Chien as Feng Jia Ji
- Wong Lai as Guan Yun's mother
- Annie Liu as Guan San
- Wong Ching-Ho as Cashier Wang
- Wang Han-Chen as Cashier Qin
- Shum Lo as Cashier Zhuo
- Lui Tat as Zheng
- Paul Wong Kwan as Meng Long
- Yu Tai-Ping as Chief Li
- Hsiao Yu as Lui Jing
- Chan Fai-Kei as Meng Hu
- Wong Ka-Leung as Meng Biao
- Lam Chi-Tai as Chen Qing
- Chan Chi-Lok as Meng Jiao/extra
- Yang Hsiung as Bodyguard
- Tony Tam Chun-To as Bodyguard
- Teng Wei-Hao as Bodyguard
- Cheung Lin-Ping as Bodyguard
- Ngai Tim-Choi as Waiter
- Lau Fong-Sai as Waiter
- Chow Kin-Ping as Servant
- Chan Hung as Servant
- Ha Kwok-Wing as Servant/Thug
- Lai Yau-Hing as Servant
- Choi Kwok-Keung as Servant
- Lau Chun as Restaurant boss
