= Shaolin Daredevils =

1979 Hong Kong film by Chang Cheh

The Daredevils
- Film poster with the original title The Daredevils

Chinese name
- Traditional Chinese: 雜技亡命隊
- Simplified Chinese: 杂技亡命队
Transcriptions
Standard Mandarin
- Hanyu Pinyin: Zájì Wángmìng Duì
Yue: Cantonese
- Jyutping: Zaap6 Gei6 Mong4 Ming6 Deoi6
- Directed by: Chang Cheh
- Screenplay by: Chang Cheh; Ni Kuang
- Produced by: Run Run Shaw
- Starring: Lo Mang; Chiang Sheng; Wong Lik; Sun Chien; Lu Feng; Philip Kwok
- Cinematography: Cho Wai-Kei
- Edited by: Chiang Hsing-Lung; Lee Yim-Hoi
- Music by: Eddie H. Wang
- Production company: Shaw Brothers Studio
- Distributed by: Shaw Brothers Studio
- Release date: 9 June 1979 (Hong Kong)
- Running time: 80 minutes
- Country: Hong Kong
- Languages: Cantonese; Mandarin

The Daredevils (Chinese: 雜技亡命隊; alternatively titled Shaolin Daredevils, Magnificent Acrobats, 5 Kung Fu Heroes, and Venom Warriors) is a 1979 Hong Kong film directed by Chang Cheh, produced by Run Run Shaw, and starring the Venoms. It is known internationally by its American title Daredevils Of Kung Fu (as distributed by World Northal).

== Plot ==
In Republic era China, former bandit-turned-soldier Han Peichang (Wong Lik) mutinies against his superior, Division Commander Yang (Wang Han-chen), slaughtering him and his entire household and assumes control of his estate and army. The sole survivor, Yang's eldest son, Daying (Lo Mang), manages to escape. He finds his friends Chen Feng (Chiang Sheng), Fu Quanyi (Lu Feng), and Xin Zheng (Sun Chien), who vow to help him seek justice. Knowing they are at a severe disadvantage against an entire militia, they recruit another compatriot, a merchant escort and martial artist Liang Guoren (Philip Kwok), for help. In attempt to uplift the grieving Daying, they put on an acrobatic show in the streets to raise money for dinner, although their earnings end up meagre. Chen however, having once been a pickpocket, secures their funds by nicking a spectator's wallet. That night, they enjoy a lavish feast and return home blind drunk with the exception of Daying, who secretly takes a grappling hook Chen used during his performance. He later departs, leaving behind some money and a letter detailing his plans to seek revenge on his lonesome. The next day during another performance, Chen discovers his hook has vanished. Xin Zheng arrives urging them to quickly return, whereupon they find Daying's letter.

Han meanwhile, has gathered an ensemble of skilled fighters to train together and is himself a skilled user of the sai. Using the grapple hook, Daying scales the rooftop and goes to locate Han just as the session finishes. He manages to best one of Han's bodyguards, but is simultaneously assailed by Han and another henchman and sustains serious injuries. Soldiers then arrive and he is shot to death and his body put on display at the city walls. Meanwhile, Chen, Fu, Liang, and Xin secretly break into Han's military supply and manage to make off with two crates before they are discovered. To their disappointment however, they find one crate filled with military gourds and the other, although containing state of the art guns, have no bullets. Things worsen when they learn of Daying's demise and swear revenge. They concoct a plan to infiltrate Han's forces and assassinate him by disguising themselves as members of an affluent family.

They attend Han's marriage, offering his own stolen guns as gifts to Han's Chief of Staff Xu (Chan Shen). Unaware that the guns are from his own supply base, Han is impressed and personally dines with them whereupon Fu convinces him to murder a head commander and take the position for himself, promising his support. That night, Liang reveals their plans to lure Han to one of the storage sheds and kill him there. The next day, Xin invites Han to the shed but the latter grows suspicious when he is told not to bring any soldiers and only a handful of personal guards. He leaves Xu to monitor Xin, who stays behind, and orders him to bring reinforcements to the shed if he does not return within the hour. Once Han and his men reach the shed, Chen and Liang lock them in and the three men reveal their identities whereupon a fight breaks out. Using their acrobatic skills and athleticism to their advantage, they bring down Han and his men and avenge Daying. Meanwhile, Xu receives word of the missing guns from the supply base and Xin, realizing he has been found out, kills him but is shot to death by several soldiers. As soldiers surround and begin breaking into the storage shed, Liang stays behind to hold them off while Chen and Fu escape and is killed in the ensuing gunfire.

== Cast ==
- Lo Mang as Yang Daying
- Chiang Sheng as Chen Feng
- Wong Lik as Commander Han Peichang
- Sun Chien as Xin Zheng
- Lu Feng as Fu Quanyi
- Philip Kwok as Liang Guoren
- Chan Shen as Chief of Staff Xu
- Tony Tam as Yuan Biao, bodyguard no. 1
- Yu Tai-ping as Lin Zhen, bodyguard no. 3
- Yang Hsiung as Bodyguard no. 2
- Walter Tso as Liang Chuan
- Hsiao Yu as Yang Daxiang
- Wang Han-chen as Division Commander Yang
