= Chang Cheh =

Chinese film director

- Born: 張易揚 (Chang Yi-yang); 17 January 1924; Shanghai, China
- Died: 22 June 2002 (aged 79); Hong Kong
- Years active: 1947–1993
- Awards: Asia Pacific Film Festival; 1970 Best Director (Vengeance!)

Chang Yi-yang
- Traditional Chinese: 張易揚
- Simplified Chinese: 张易扬
Transcriptions
Standard Mandarin
- Hanyu Pinyin: Zhāng Yìyáng
Yue: Cantonese
- Jyutping: Zoeng^{1} Ji^{6}joeng^{4}

Chang Cheh
- Traditional Chinese: 張徹
- Simplified Chinese: 张彻
Transcriptions
Standard Mandarin
- Hanyu Pinyin: Zhāng Chè
Yue: Cantonese
- Jyutping: Zoeng^{1} Cit^{3}

Chang Cheh (Chinese: 張徹; pinyin: Zhāng Chè; 17 January 1924 – 22 June 2002) was a Chinese filmmaker, screenwriter, lyricist and producer active in the 1960s, 1970s and 1980s. Chang directed more than 90 films in Hong Kong and Taiwan, the majority of them with the Shaw Brothers Studio in Hong Kong. Most of his films are action films, especially wuxia and kung fu films filled with violence.

== Early life ==
Born to a military family in Hangzhou and raised in Shanghai Chang studied politics at the Faculty of Law of the Central University of Chongqing but dropped out to join a social education troupe. After World War II ended, he attracted the notice of Chang Tao-fan a high-ranking KMT official who appointed him secretary of the Cultural Movement Committee (CMC), Shanghai. His first contact with the film industry came when he took up the cause of the "Twelve Filmmakers Collaboration Case" in which twelve Chinese filmmakers who worked for the Japanese-owned China United Film Company during the war were accused of collaborating with Japanese forces.

At this time, Chang ran a KMT-operated theater in Shanghai's Hongkou district and had difficulty securing films until he befriended the Liu Brothers (Liu Zhongliang and Liu Zhonghao) who ran the Jincheng Grand, now the Lyric, and Jindu Theaters. The Liu Brothers also produced films and as political tensions grew between Nationalists and socialists, Chang suggested that they movie equipment and personnel to Taiwan as a safeguard. To mask the move, they arranged to film a movie in Taiwan and Chang appointed himself its director. Happenings in Ali Shan (1949) became Taiwan's first locally-produced Mandarin-language film, and the song Chang wrote for it, "Over the Green Hill", became a popular hit.

After this experience, Chang caught the eye of Chiang Ching-kuo, the oldest son of President Chiang Kai-shek, and became a member of his newly-established "Chief Political Department" and through that he became an official in the only film studio in Taiwan at the time, the KMT-run Central Motion Picture Corporation. However, Chang got caught in the middle of a political struggle and when he received an invitation from the MP&GI star Helen Li Mei to come to Hong Kong and direct her film Wild Fire (1957) he leapt at the chance to escape. Li produced the film herself and wanted a younger director who collaborate with her, but because Chang was unknown in Hong Kong rumors spread that the two were having an affair, and MP&GI persuaded her to remove Chang and finish shooting the film with an assistant.

After that, Chang became a movie critic writing reviews for New Life Evening Post and columns for Taiwan's United Daily News, which caught the eye of MP&GI's Stephen Soong, who recommended him for a contract as a screenwriter for the company. Chang was unhappy there and within a year he had been recommended by his bridge partner, Raymond Chow, to Shaw Brothers as a screenwriter and took a contract with Shaw Brothers that began the day his MP&GI contract ended.

== Early years at Shaw Brothers ==
Shaw Brothers' enormous Movietown film studio opened in 1961, around the same time Chang started working there, and he successfully convinced the company's head, Sir Run Run Shaw, not to soundproof the studios and instead shoot films without sound and dub them later. As a result, Chang became head of the dubbing department as well as a screenwriter. In 1965 he received his first directing credit at Shaw alongside Yuan Qiu-feng for the huangmei opera movie, The Butterfly Chalice.

In 1965, Shaw Brothers' magazine, Southern Screen, published an article called "Shaw Launches Colour Wuxia Century" in which it announced seven new films that were either completed or in production, claiming, “Shaws will break with tradition...Creating a new vista for martial arts films. The fake, fantastical, and theatrical fighting and the so-called special effects of the past will be replaced by realistic action and fighting that immediately decides life or death.” The films were Temple of the Red Lotus (1965) and The Twin Swords (1965), which were both supervised by Chang and starred Jimmy Wong Yu; Tiger Boy (1966), a black and white low-budget film written and directed by Chang, also starring Jimmy Wong Yu; Come Drink With Me (1966) directed by King Hu and starring Cheng Pei-pei; Knight of Knights (1966) written by Chang; and One-Armed Swordsman (1967), written and directed by Chang, starring Jimmy Wong Yu, and featuring action choreography by Tong Kai and Lau Kar-leung. It became a massive hit, often heralded as the Hong Kong movie to earn one million dollars at the box office, although in reality that barrier had been broken by The Golden Eagle (1964) three years previously. The success of One-Armed Swordsman heralded a new wave of martial arts movies at Shaw, shot in color, featuring more violent and realistic action choreography, and focusing on male, rather than female, leads who were Hong Kong's biggest box office draws at the time. The other two movies in the "Colour Wuxia Century" met less auspicious fates. The Sword and the Lute was shelved for two years until 1967, and Red Maiden was never released.

That same year, Chang also wrote and directed the Jimmy Wong Yu movie, The Assassin, another hit with action choreography by Lau Kar-leung and Tong Kai. Together, this team would go on to make Golden Swallow (1968) a sequel to King Hu's classic wuxia picture Come Drink With Me co-starring Cheng Pei-pei and Return of the One-Armed Swordsman (1969), both of which became box office hits.

== The Iron Triangle ==
In late 1969/early 1970, Jimmy Wong Yu broke his contract with Shaw Brothers and the ensuing legal conflict saw him barred from making films in Hong Kong for three years. Without his leading man and feeling like his movies were simply recycling previous films Chang made a musical, The Singing Thief (1969), and hired its screenwriter, Chiu Kang-chien, to write Dead End (1969), a semi-experimental "youth gone wild" thriller which he believed would represent a new direction for his work. However, the movie ran afoul of local censors, and Chang felt he needed to return to wu xia films.

Chang took two young actors he had been working with and successfully paired them together as action leads in Have Sword Will Travel (1969). David Chiang came from a film family and he had been working as a stuntman at Shaw. Noting his good Mandarin, Chang began giving him lines, leading to bigger roles. Ti Lung had entered Shaw's Actor Training Program and after impressing Chang in a minor role in Return of the One-Armed Swordsman (1969), Chang had offered him the lead in Dead End. In 1970, Chang paired them in his movie Vengeance! which represented a new direction for him as a filmmaker. He abandoned the Qing Dynasty setting of most wu xia movies for a movie set in the early Republican era, and he abandoned wu xia swordplay for kung fu. The movie was an enormous hit, and won Chang "Best Director" and David Chiang (billed as John Chiang) "Best Actor" at the 16th Asian Film Festival, the first time a Hong Kong film had won these two categories.

One year later, Chang delivered another David Chiang/Ti Lung action picture set in the early Republican era, The Duel (1971), which became the second martial arts movie to be dubbed into English and receive a general release in the United States. Now linked firmly in the public's mind, Chang, Ti Lung, and David Chiang became known as the "Iron Triangle" and would go on to make 19 movies together, not counting Vengeance! and the five films they made before it.

== Chang's Film Company & the Shaolin Cycle ==
Around 1974, Shaw Brothers encouraged Chang to start his own production company, which he called Chang's Film Co. (in Chinese 長弓電影公司, or Longbow Film Co.). Shaw had funds in Taiwan that could not be transferred out of the country due to financial controls and they wanted Chang to use these funds to make Taiwan-based productions. Shaw received all the profit from these movies, but because Chang was in charge of production he had more freedom.

While checking into a hotel in Taipei, Chang ran into popular Hong Kong comedian Michael Hui. During their conversation, Hui told Chang that Taiwanese and Hong Kong films should focus on the folklore and traditions of Southern China, including their martial arts. When Chang returned to Hong Kong he met with Lau Kar-leung and Tong Kai to discuss how to make authentic Southern Chinese style martial arts movies and Lau Kar-leung suggested focusing on the legends of Shaolin Temple.

Their first Shaolin movie, Heroes Two (1974), started with the burning of Shaolin Temple and focused on the Southern Chinese folk hero, Fong Sai-yuk, played here by Alexander Fu Sheng, a charismatic 20 year old graduate of Shaw's Southern Drama School. The movie emphasized the realism of Southern Chinese martial arts styles and in theaters it was preceded by a 9-minute short film called "Three Styles of Hung School's Kung Fu" in which stars Alexander Fu Sheng, Chen Kuan-tai, and fellow Shaw's actor, Chi Kuan-chun demonstrate authentic Southern style kung fu. It was the first movie for Chang's Film Company and became a box office success. Chang had enormous confidence in Alexander Fu Sheng's potential and cast him in the youth drama Friends (1974) that same year for which he won "Best Newcomer" at the 20th Asian-Pacific Film Festival.

Fu Sheng went on to play one of the leads in all of Chang's follow-up Shaolin movies, including Men From the Monastery (1974), Shaolin Martial Arts (1974), and the epic Five Shaolin Masters, which Chang claimed drained the last of Shaw's money captured in Taiwan. It was also the first of these movies to be fully filmed in Taiwan, and because Tong Kai did not want to travel, Lau Kar-leung choreographed it with his brother, Lau Kar-wing. Fu Sheng also starred in Disciples of Shaolin (1975) but during the filming of this movie Chang and Lau Kar-leung fell out over artistic differences and it would be the last movie they completed together. Reportedly, Lau would work for a few days on Chang's historical epic, Marco Polo (1975), before walking off the set, vowing to quit the film industry and movie to America to open his own martial arts schools. Mona Fong, Run Run Shaw's mistress and then head of production at Shaw Brothers, persuaded him to come back to Hong Kong instead and make his directorial debut, Spiritual Boxer (1975).

With his films now attracting Taiwanese investors as well as Shaw's, Chang decided to shoot a World War II film, 7-Man Army (1976), set in 1933, followed by Boxer Rebellion (1976) set in 1900. With a Taiwanese distributor, Lin Chong-feng, paying $1 million Hong Kong dollars for the Taiwanese rights, at a time when the average Shaw Brothers movie was budgeted at $200,000 Hong Kong dollars, Chang rented costumes from Europe, cast Richard Harrison for a role, and convinced actress Li Li-hua to come out of retirement to play the Empress Dowager in the film. For 7-Man Army, the Taiwanese military contributed troops, tanks, artillery, and aircraft for certain scenes. However, Chang's association with Chiang Ching-kuo caught up with him. Chiang's close associate, General Wang Sheng, considered himself the natural successor to the presidency and didn't appreciate the return of Chang Cheh, viewed as a one-time favorite of President Chang's. He pressed for Chang to return to Hong Kong, and claimed that films like Boxer's Rebellion showing Allied forces invading China should be banned. While the film was not banned, it was cut substantially and did not perform well at the box office. When the movie was released in Hong Kong, British censors forced Shaw to change its title to Spiritual Fists, and cut it further. It failed there, too.

Despite the failure of the film, Chang's Taiwanese investor and distributor, Lin Chong-feng, stuck with him and offered him more money. Upon hearing of this, Run Run Shaw flew to Taiwan and offered Chang a $1 million, five-year contract to come back to Hong Kong and Shaw Studios. Worried that the Taiwanese film market was going into decline, Chang accepted.

== Venoms Mob and later career ==
Before he left Taiwan, Chang had started working with several young stunt performers. Philip Kwok had attended to the National Taiwan College of Performing Arts and gotten a job doing stunts on Shaolin Avengers (1976). Lau Kar-leung pointed him out as being particularly impressive, so Chang asked screenwriter Ni Kuang to write a role for him in Marco Polo (1975). Lu Feng and Chiang Sheng also studied Chinese Opera in Taiwan, but at a different school than Kwok. However, the three of them knew each other and soon Lu Feng was working with Lau Kar-leung as an assistant choreographer, and Chiang Sheng came with them as a stunt performer. When Chang returned to Hong Kong he took them with him. There he decided to team them up with Alexander Fu-sheng on a movie he had in production called Chinatown Kid (1977), a showcase for a lot of his Taiwanese talent including Robert Tai and Johnny Wang Lung-wei. Philip Kwok would co-star with Alexander Fu-sheng, alongside a 22 year old newcomer who had beaten 1,000 candidates for the role, Sun Chien, and an accomplished Mantis Fist boxer, and the accountant at Chang's production company, Lo Meng. Lu Feng and Chiang Sheng appeared in small parts doing stunts.

Sensing he had something, Chang asked Ni Kuang to write a script using these five newcomers and the resulting film The Five Venoms (1978) became a hit in Hong Kong and Taiwan and the actors became collectively known in the West as the Venoms Mob. Even though Chang Cheh dismissed the movies he made on his return to Shaw Brothers as the "recycling of tired, worn-out wuxia and fist-and-kick action films" he would make 25 movies featuring either the full Venoms Mob or some combination thereof. After making Ode to Gallantry (1982) the Venoms disbanded and returned to Taiwan, where Philip Kwok directed his only movie, Ninja in the Deadly Trap (1982). The following year, Chang's final film for Shaw Brothers was released, The Weird Man (1983), and his contract was not renewed.

Seeing the great success of the Mainland China-shot Shaolin Temple (1982), Chang made it known that he would like to try the same. He shot The Dancing Warrior (1985) partially in New York City, which co-starred Shaolin wu shu instructor, Dennis Brown, and later that year the Chinese Ministry of Culture invited him to shoot a movie in Mainland China. Chang relocated his career again and filmed Great Shanghai 1937 (1986) followed by Cross the River (1988) as well as four more Mainland-set movies, some in association with various regional studios across Mainland China, including Slaughter in Xi'An (1990), which was filmed with the famed Xi'An Film Studio, birthplace of the Fifth Generation of Chinese filmmakers.

In 1992, he released his final movie, Ninja in Ancient China (1993), and retired from filmmaking. He remained active as an advocate for Hong Kong film and filmmakers, and was in regular touch with the Hong Kong Film Archive. In 2001, they asked him to write his memoir, which he sent in weekly installments via fax. In March, 2002, the first draft was finished and in April of that year he received a Lifetime Achievement Award at the 21st Hong Kong Film Awards. He died in June of that year.

== Themes and techniques ==
Chang is most closely associated with two terms he popularized. The first is yanggang or “masculinity” which appears in his films starting with 1967's One-Armed Swordsman. Frustrated by the fact that most of Hong Kong's major stars were women while the biggest cinematic icons around the world were men like John Wayne and Steve McQueen he believed Hong Kong movies could find a bigger audience by promoting male stars. After all, he reasoned, good-looking young men would appeal to both male and female audiences. As a result, his films focus on the friendship between men and the code of brotherhood, with their lead characters often men who are either angry young swordsmen, martyrs, or other outsiders who defy authority.

These characters are bold, love to fight, and are willing to die for their causes. In his early films, many of his main characters have been wronged by either the system or love, and their send of self-respect and yanggang is only reborn through training and the loyalty of their friends. As a result, they are willing to fight and die for these friends.

The second term associated with Chang's work is xiaozi which he first used as part of the Chinese title for 1975's Disciples of Shaolin a.k.a. (洪拳)Shaolin (小子)Xiaozi, which would loosely translate into Shaolin Boxing Punk. Xiaozi or "boxing punk" is Northern Chinese Mandarin slang that made its way into Southern Chinese Cantonese vocabulary through Chang's films and it means a young, good-looking kid who doesn't respect anyone and who's a good fighter. As Chang himself describes it, "Xiaozi was that brash image of youth, a combination of liveliness and rebelliousness with good physique and good humor."

Alexander Fu Sheng embodied the avatar of xiaozi cool in Chang's Shaolin Cycle, and the xiaozi image continued in Jackie Chan’s breakthrough portrayal of a young, brash Wong Fei-hung in Drunken Master (1978) and in Jet Li’s performance of the Southern Chinese folk hero Fong Sai-yuk in Fong Sai-yuk (1993), although shades of it are also present in Gordon Liu’s portrayal of a young Wong Fei-hung in Lau Kar-leung’s second feature, Challenge of the Masters (1976) and in Yuen Biao’s portrayal of real-life wing chun practitioner, Leung Jan, in Sammo Hung's The Prodigal Son (1981).

Chang targeted his action movies at young people, writing, "They are energetic and thus more prone to pugnacious, aggressive behavior than adults…Films that favour action and excitement are born as a response." In particular, he believed that the times in which he began his career deeply influenced his movies, writing, "The 60s and 70s were the most energetic periods of Hong Kong — the period when young people exerted themselves. The age of love tales was the past. The masses were striving ahead in a rebellious mood and the colonial administration was receiving a shock to the system." 1967 saw Hong Kong wracked by civil disobedience and a terrorist bombing campaign and the same week that One-Armed Swordsman was released was the same week as the Shau Tau Kok Incident that saw five Hong Kong police officers machine-gunned on the border between Hong Kong and China, and while he was shooting The Assassin, riots broke out in Hong Kong. Chang wrote, "My wuxia films were often tinted with the passions of the times."

Chang emphasized emotion and, as action choreographer Tong Kai said, "he loved blood and excitement and crowd scenes teeming with soldiers." He pioneered the use of a handheld camera in Hong Kong cinema and studied sports broadcasts and American films like Bonnie & Clyde to perfect his use of slow motion to emphasize action. Using rapid cutting, dynamic screen composition, and copious amounts of blood, the violence in his movies seemed sensational and extreme compared to what had come before. As one critic wrote, “He is fond of emotional overstatement, expressed through an excessive use of close-ups, many in baroque compositions with odd angles...creating a slapdash energy.”

Unlike many directors, Chang was deeply involved with choreographing his action scenes. Screenwriter Ni Kuang would only indicate in his scripts when a fight happened and who was injured, but Chang would work closely with his action choreographers, telling them exactly what he wanted, placing his own cameras, and setting the frame. Part of his precision was due, in part, to the fact that Chang worked with the same cinematographer, Yukio Miyaki (a.k.a. Kung Mu-to), on 45 films, from 1969’s The Singing Thief to 1980’s Heaven and Hell.

== Influence ==
Although he was often dismissed by critics at the time, it would be hard to overestimate the influence of Chang on Hong Kong cinema. His One-Armed Swordsman (1967) turned wuxia movies from tales of refinded silk-robed scholars into violent, fast-paced, spectacles where angry young men hacked their way through their enemies and is generally considered the first truly modern action movie in Hong Kong cinema. His Boxer From Shantung (1972) is considered the first modern gangster movie in Hong Kong cinema, Vengeance! (1970) and The Duel (1971) were marked the first time the early Republican era had been used as a setting for a martial arts film, and Heroes Two (1974) became the first movie to popularize putting the legend of Shaolin Temple onscreen.

Chang defined the image of his actors, according to Chen Kuan-tai. Chang and his preferred screenwriter Ni Kuang carefully detailed every aspect of their onscreen personae, and as a result a number of his discoveries became major stars across Asia, including Jimmy Wang Yu, Lo Lieh, Chen Kuan-tai, David Chiang, Ti Lung, and Alexander Fu Sheng. Lau Kar-leung would go on to become one of the great martial arts film directors after working with Chang for years, and he would co-direct or produce numerous films with up-and-coming talents who he considered part of his stable like Kuei Chih-hung, who would go on to become a well-respected director in Hong Kong. John Woo was his assistant director, mostly handling post-production, on four features in the early '70s and credits him as an influence. Director Peter Chan cites him as an influence on his 2007 movie The Warlords, and Tsui Hark remade his One-Armed Swordsman as The Blade. Quentin Tarantino cites Chang as an influence of Kill Bill (2003).

== As lyricist ==
Chang wrote the lyrics of more than 70 Chinese songs that have appeared in his films. The theme song of his directorial debut, Happenings in Ali Shan (Chinese: 阿里山的姑娘; pinyin: Ālǐ shān de gūniáng; lit. 'Alishan Range's Girls'), also known as "Gao Shan Qing" (高山青; "The High Green Mountain"), is a particularly famous song in the Sinophone world.

== Filmography ==
=== Films ===
Year	English title	Original title	Director	Writer	Notes
1947	Girl's Mask	假面女郎	Fang Peilin	Yes	
1950	Happenings in Ali Shan	阿里山風雲	Yes	Yes	co-directed with Cheung Ying; first Mandarin film entirely produced in Taiwan
1951	Never Separated	永不分離	Chu Hsin Fu	Yes	
1957	Wild Fire	野火	Yes	Yes	co-directed with Helen Li Mei
1960	Tragic Melody	桃花淚	Lo Wei	Yes	
1960	The Tender Trap of Espionage	脂粉間諜網	Lo Wei	Yes	
1960	Black Butterfly	黑蝴蝶	Lo Wei	Yes	
1961	Song Without Words	無語問蒼天	Lo Wei	Yes	
1961	The Girl with the Golden Arm	賊美人	Tang Huang	Yes	
1961	You Were Meant for Me	遊戲人間	Wong Tin-lam	Yes	
1962	It's Always Spring	桃李爭春	Evan Yang	Yes	
1962	Come Rain, Come Shine	野花戀	Tang Huang	Yes	
1962	Her Pearly Tears	珍珠淚	Wong Tin-lam	Yes	
1964	The Amorous Lotus Pan	潘金蓮	Chow Sze-loke	Yes	
1964	The Female Prince	雙鳳奇緣	Chow Sze-loke	Yes	
1964	The Warlord and the Actress	血濺牡丹紅	Ho Meng Hua	Yes	
1965	The Mermaid	魚美人	Kao Li	Yes	
1965	The Butterfly Chalice	蝴蝶盃	Yes	Yes	co-directed with Yuen Chow-fung
1965	Crocodile River	鱷魚河	Lo Wei	Yes	
1965	Inside the Forbidden City	宋宮秘史	Kao Li	Yes	
1965	Call of the Sea	怒海情仇	Lo Wei	Yes	
1966	Tiger Boy	虎俠殲仇	Yes	Yes	
1966	The Knight of Knights	文素臣	Hsih Chun	Yes	
1966	The Magnificent Trio	邊城三俠	Yes	Yes	
1966	The Perfumed Arrow	女秀才	Kao Li	Yes	
1967	The Trail of the Broken Blade	斷腸劍	Yes	Yes	
1967	One-Armed Swordsman	獨臂刀	Yes	Yes	
1967	The Assassin	大刺客	Yes	Yes	
1968	Golden Swallow	金燕子	Yes	Yes	
1969	The Singing Thief	大盜歌王	Yes		
1969	Return of the One-Armed Swordsman	獨臂刀王	Yes	Yes	
1969	The Flying Dagger	飛刀手	Yes		
1969	The Invincible Fist	鐵手無情	Yes		
1969	Dead End	死角	Yes		
1969	Have Sword, Will Travel	保鏢	Yes		
1970	The Wandering Swordsman	遊俠兒	Yes		
1970	Vengeance	報仇	Yes	Yes	
1970	The Heroic Ones	十三太保	Yes	Yes	
1970	The Singing Killer	小煞星	Yes		
1971	King Eagle	鷹王	Yes		
1971	The New One-Armed Swordsman	新獨臂刀	Yes		
1971	The Duel	大決鬥	Yes		
1971	The Anonymous Heroes	無名英雄	Yes		
1971	Duel of Fists	拳擊	Yes		
1971	The Deadly Duo	雙俠	Yes		
1972	The Boxer From Shantung	馬永貞	Yes	Yes	co-directed with Pao Hsueh Li
1972	Angry Guest	惡客	Yes		
1972	The Water Margin	水滸傳	Yes	Yes	
1972	Trilogy of Swordsmanship	群英會	Yes	Yes	co-directed with Cheng Kang
1972	Young People	年輕人	Yes	Yes	
1972	Delightful Forest	快活林	Yes	Yes	co-directed with Pao Hsueh Li
1972	Man of Iron	仇連環	Yes	Yes	co-directed with Pao Hsueh Li
1972	Four Riders	四騎士	Yes	Yes	
1973	The Delinquent	憤怒青年	Yes	Yes	co-directed with Kuei Chih-Hung
1973	The Blood Brothers	刺馬	Yes	Yes	
1973	The Generation Gap	叛逆	Yes	Yes	
1973	Police Force	警察	Yes	Yes	co-directed with Tsai Yang-ming
1973	The Pirate	大海盜	Yes	Yes	co-director
1973	Iron Bodyguard	大刀王五	Yes		co-directed with Pao Hsueh Li
1974	Heroes Two	方世玉與洪熙官	Yes	Yes	
1974	The Savage Five	五虎將	Yes	Yes	
1974	Men from the Monastery	少林子弟	Yes	Yes	
1974	Friends	朋友	Yes	Yes	
1974	The Legend of the 7 Golden Vampires		Yes		English-language film, co-director
1974	Shaolin Martial Arts	洪拳與詠春	Yes	Yes	
1974	Na Cha the Great	哪吒	Yes	Yes	
1974	Five Shaolin Masters	少林五祖	Yes		
1975	All Men Are Brothers	蕩寇誌	Yes	Yes	co-directed with Wu Ma
1975	Disciples of Shaolin	洪拳小子	Yes	Yes	
1975	The Fantastic Magic Baby	紅孩兒	Yes	Yes	
1975	The Bloody Escape	逃亡	Yes	No	co-directed with Sun Chung
1975	Marco Polo	馬哥波羅	Yes	Yes	
1976	Boxer Rebellion	八國聯軍	Yes	Yes	
1976	7-Man Army	八道楼子	Yes	Yes	co-director
1976	The Shaolin Avengers	方世玉與胡惠乾	Yes	Yes	co-directed with Wu Ma
1976	The New Shaolin Boxers	蔡李佛小子	Yes	Yes	co-directed with Wu Ma
1976	Shaolin Temple	少林寺	Yes	Yes	co-directed with Wu Ma
1977	The Naval Commandos	海軍突擊隊	Yes		co-director
1977	Magnificent Wanderers	江湖漢子	Yes	Yes	co-directed with Wu Ma
1977	The Brave Archer	射鵰英雄傳	Yes		
1977	Chinatown Kid	唐人街小子	Yes	Yes	
1978	The Brave Archer 2	射鵰英雄傳續集	Yes		
1978	Five Venoms	五毒	Yes	Yes	
1978	Invincible Shaolin	南少林與北少林	Yes	Yes	
1978	Crippled Avengers	殘缺	Yes	Yes	
1979	Life Gamble	生死鬥	Yes	Yes	
1979	Shaolin Rescuers	街市英雄	Yes	Yes	
1979	Shaolin Daredevils	雜技亡命隊	Yes	Yes	
1979	Magnificent Ruffians	賣命小子	Yes	Yes	
1979	Kid with the Golden Arm	金臂童	Yes	Yes	
1979	Ten Tigers from Kwangtung	廣東十虎與後五虎	Yes	Yes	
1980	Heaven and Hell	第三類打鬥	Yes	Yes	
1980	2 Champions of Shaolin	少林與武當	Yes	Yes	
1980	Flag of Iron	鐵旗門	Yes	Yes	
1980	The Rebel Intruders	大殺四方	Yes	Yes	
1980	Legend of the Fox	飛狐外傳	Yes	Yes	
1981	Sword Stained With Royal Blood	碧血劍	Yes	Yes	
1981	Masked Avengers	叉手	Yes	Yes	
1981	The Brave Archer 3	射鵰英雄傳第三集	Yes	Yes	
1982	House of Traps	冲霄樓	Yes	Yes	
1982	The Brave Archer and His Mate	神鵰俠侶	Yes	Yes	
1982	Five Element Ninjas	五遁忍術	Yes	Yes	
1982	Ode to Gallantry	俠客行	Yes	Yes	
1983	The Weird Man	神通術與小霸王	Yes	Yes	
1983	Attack of the Joyful Goddess	撞鬼	Yes		
1984	Death Ring	擂台	Yes		
1984	The Demons	九子天魔	Yes		
1984	Shanghai 13	上海灘十三太保	Yes	Yes	
1985	The Dancing Warrior	霹靂情	Yes		
1986	Great Shanghai 1937	大上海1937	Yes	Yes	
1987	Slaughter in Xian	西安殺戮	Yes	Yes	
1987	Cross the River	過江	Yes	Yes	
1990	Hidden Hero	江湖奇兵	Yes	Yes	
1991	Go West to Subdue Demons	西行平妖	Yes	Yes	
1993	Ninja In Ancient China	神通	Yes	Yes	

=== TV series ===
In 1992, Chang produced Taiwan Television's Ma's Assassination (刺馬), which tells the same story as his 1973 film The Blood Brothers. The series is directed by Lu Feng and stars, among other actors, David Chiang.
