= Shaolin Rescuers =

1979 Hong Kong film by Chang Cheh

- Film poster

Chinese name
- Traditional Chinese: 街市英雄
- Simplified Chinese: 街市英雄
Transcriptions
Standard Mandarin
- Hanyu Pinyin: Jiēshì yīngxióng
Yue: Cantonese
- Jyutping: Gaai1 Si5 Jing1 Hung4
- Directed by: Chang Cheh
- Screenplay by: Chang Cheh; Ni Kuang; Choi Nai-ban
- Produced by: Mona Fong
- Starring: Jason Pai Piao; Lu Feng; Lo Mang; Philip Kwok; Yu Tai-ping; Chiang Sheng; Sun Chien; Walter Tso; Wong Lik; Yang Chi-Ching
- Cinematography: Cho Wai-Kei
- Edited by: Chiang Hsing-Lung; Lee Yim-Hoi
- Music by: Frankie Chan
- Production company: Shaw Brothers
- Distributed by: Shaw Brothers
- Release date: 24 March 1979 (Hong Kong)
- Running time: 110 minutes
- Country: Hong Kong
- Language: Mandarin

Shaolin Rescuers (Chinese: 街市英雄; alternately titled Avenging Warriors of Shaolin) is a 1979 Hong Kong martial arts film directed by Chang Cheh, produced by the Shaw Brothers, and starring Jason Pai Piao and the Venom Mob.

== Plot ==
Wu-Tang leader Pai Mei (Chow Kin-Ping) and his head disciple Gao Jinzhong (Lu Feng) launch an attack on the Shaolin Temple, killing its disciples San-De and Fang Shiyu while a wounded Hong Xiguan (Jason Pai Piao) narrowly escapes.

Chen Ah Jin (Lo Mang) is a local tofu maker and mantis style practitioner. He is a close friend to Yang Dabao (Philip Kwok) a waiter and Hei Hu disciple. Although the two work menial jobs with which they are unhappy, they dream of one day becoming great heroes and dying for noble causes. They befriend Zhu Cai (Sun Chien), a light skill student at a local martial arts school after they save him from a beating initiated by Zeng (Ku Kuan Chung), one of the students there.

Meanwhile, Pai Mei and Gao continue tracking down Shaolin disciples. They murder a man named Huang (Wong Lik) and the abbot of Qing Yun Temple, Master Zhishan (Tai Kwan-tak), but not before the latter tasks Han Qi (Chiang Sheng), a young boatsman, into locating Hong. Hong, meanwhile, arrives at Zhu Cai's school as the master there, Zhou Cheng (Chan Shen) is an old friend of his. Zhou, however, rejects Hong’s request for help. Secretly in liaison with the Wu-Tang clan, he immediately reports his visit to Gao and sends his students to search for him. Hong later eats at Yang's restaurant and enquires about Han Qi, to no avail. He later collapses from his wounds and is discovered by Chen, Yang, and Zhu. They find a prescription on his person and manage to collect enough money to acquire the medicine and nurse him back to health. He recuperates at Chen's tofu shop and thanks the trio by teaching them some of his techniques. When Zeng later causes trouble at Yang's restaurant, Yang fights him off, receiving unexpected help from Han Qi and later informs him of Hong's location.

When Zhu goes to get more medicine for Hong, he is spotted by Zeng who manages to get a hold of the ingredients and surmises it is for Hong. Zhu is confronted by Gao and his men but accidentally reveals Hong's hiding place. Yang and Han create a distraction, allowing the group to escape and hide out at Zhu's martial art school. There, they join Hong in attacking Zhou Cheng and the rest of his students. Gao and his men arrive to find Zhou and the students dead. They track Hong's group down to the cloth dyeing building nearby where Gao decides to wait until morning to attack and have his men alert the Qing troops so as not to risk one of the fugitives escaping in the dark.

Morning arrives and Gao, upon learning the Qing troops have been alerted, launches his attack. In the ensuing fight, Hong, Chen, Yang, Zhu, and Han manage to kill Gao's men but he succeeds in killing Zhu and mortally wounds Chen and Yang. Eventually, the group take him on together whereupon they succeed in killing him. Chen and Yang bravely opt to stay behind and fend off the encroaching Qing soldiers to buy Han and Hong enough time to escape, achieving their dream of dying for a noble cause.

== Cast ==
- Jason Pai Piao as Hong Xiguan
- Lu Feng as Gao Jinzhong
- Lo Mang as Chen Ah Jin
- Philip Kwok as Yang Dabao
- Chiang Sheng as Han Qi
- Sun Chien as Zhu Cai
- Chiang Nan as Huang
- Walter Tso as Chen's Sifu
- Yang Chi-ching as Restaurant boss
- Wong Ching-ho as Dye factory boss
- Wong Lik as Wang
- Chan Shen as Zhou Cheng
- Yu Tai-ping as Zhou Feng
- Ching Miao as Magistrate
- Ku Kuan Chung as Zeng Shiguang
- Yang Hsiung as Fan Tiancong
- Tony Tam as Tiger Boy
- Paul Wong as Fang Xiaoyu
- Lau Fong-sai as Leopard Kid
- Chow Kin-ping as Pai Mei/Student
- Chan Hung as Nian Ruiqing/Student/Soldier
- Lai Yau-hing as Li Jinlun/Student
- Hsiao Yu as Fang Shiyu
- Chan Fai-kei as Monk San-De
- Lam Chi-tai as Tong Qianjin/Student
- Teng Wei-hao as Hu Weigan/Student
- Tai Kwan-tak as Master Zhishan
- Woo Wang-daat as Master Xinglong

== Reception ==
Sylvia Rorem of Funimation praised the actors' athleticism and highlighted Ku Kuan Chung's comedic performance as "impressive and memorable". However, she criticized the film's action and its overly comedic nature, and found the film lacking in emotional engagement. She recommended the film for diehard fans of the Venom Mob but felt that it would "disappoint less specialized, drama oriented kung fu cinema fans".

== Awards ==
For his portrayal of Gao Jinzhong, Lu Feng won Best Supporting Actor at the 25th Asia-Pacific Film Festival in 1979. Lu has cited the award as "the greatest honor" and lists the character as one of his favorite roles.
