= The Rebel Intruders =

1980 Hong Kong film by Chang Cheh

- Film poster

Chinese name
- Traditional Chinese: 大殺四方
- Simplified Chinese: 大杀四方
Transcriptions
Standard Mandarin
- Hanyu Pinyin: Dà Shā Sìfāng
Yue: Cantonese
- Jyutping: Daai6 Saat3 Sei3 Fong1
- Directed by: Chang Cheh
- Screenplay by: Chang Cheh; Ni Kuang
- Produced by: Runme Shaw
- Starring: Lu Feng; Sun Chien; Wong Lik; Philip Kwok; Choh Seung-Wan; Lo Mang; Chiang Sheng
- Cinematography: Cho Wai-Kei
- Edited by: Chiang Hsing-Lung; Lee Yim-Hoi
- Music by: Eddie H. Wang
- Production company: Shaw Brothers Studio
- Distributed by: Shaw Brothers Studio
- Release date: 10 September 1980 (Hong Kong)
- Running time: 96 minutes
- Country: Hong Kong
- Language: Mandarin

The Rebel Intruders (Chinese: 大殺四方; alternate title Killer Army and The Guerillas) is a 1980 Hong Kong film directed by Chang Cheh, produced by Runme Shaw, and starring the Venom Mob.

== Plot ==
During the Republic civil wars, waves of refugees arrive in a city controlled by Chen Chu-kwong (Lu Feng) who dispatches skilled martial artists Pan Peng (Wong Lik), Chang Hsiao-hu (Yang Hsiung), and Tang Yu-tung (Sun Chien) to respectively patrol the Northern, Eastern, and Western districts whilst he monitors its Southern border. Although Chang is the only one to enforce some degree of social order and treats the refugees well, the others take advantage of them, beating, robbing, and killing with impunity. A Northern refugee and Black Tiger practitioner Wang Hsu (Philip Kwok) fights back against Chen Chu-kwong's men when they try to kill him for stealing a chicken. He hides in a brothel where a courtesan there (Choh Seung-wan) helps shelter him from his pursuers and employs him as a bodyguard. Meanwhile, two other refugees from the North also enter the city: Northern Mantis practitioner Chi Chun-peng (Lo Mang), who is hired by Chang Hsiao-hu to train his men, and Yu Wen-san (Chiang Sheng), who is caught stealing food at one of Tang Yu-tung's restaurants but is taken in by the latter to work at a gambling den. The three meet at Yu's gambling den whereupon a fight breaks out between them after Yu tries swindling Wang and Chi. However, upon learning of each other's backgrounds, they end up befriending each other, eventually becoming blood brothers.

Pan Peng later intercepts a letter for Chen Chu-kwong revealing his plans to turn the city over to an enemy commander, but he nonetheless sides with him. Chen has his brother Yao Zong (Tony Tam) assassinate a colonel, Tseng (Wang Han-chen) and place the blame on a refugee, but he is spotted by Wang, Chi, and Yu when he tries planting the body to frame them. The three immediately figure out what had happened and a fight quickly breaks out. Pan arrives to see the three men kill Yao Zong, who have no choice but to flee, becoming wanted fugitives. As a city-wide manhunt begins for them, Yu takes Wang and Chi to Tang, believing he will help shelter them as well as clear their name. En route, they are confronted by Chang and reveal having caught Yao Zong committing murder and trying to frame them. This rouses Chang's suspicions and, after confronting Pan, learns the truth and Chen's plans to sell out the city. He takes the three men to see Tang and unveils Chen's treachery but Tang kills him, revealing his true colors and allegiance to the Chen family. As Tang's men arrive, Wang, Chi, and Yu fight their way out, killing Tang in the process. The three plan on taking down Chen and Pan and arrange to meet at the docks should they become separated as a boat there can take them out of the city.

Pan kidnaps the courtesan who helped Wang and forces her to lure the men out into the open. Ambushed, the three take on Pan and his men but Chi is captured and sentenced to be hanged. Some bystanders attempt to secretly free him, but are spotted by Chen's henchmen and killed, although this allows Chi enough time to free himself and escape to the docks where he finds Chen already waiting for him. Meanwhile, Wang and Yu succeed in killing Pan and rush to the docks, only to find Chi's bloodied body. Chen and his men surround the duo and attack using malleable spears. During the fight, Yu intercepts a blow meant for Wang and is fatally wounded. Wang is eventually able to pin Chen down in a chokehold and strangles him to death. As he returns to tend to Yu, the latter urges him to escape to the south and reach the Revolutionary Army before dying from his wounds. Wang boards a boat and escapes while the city is set ablaze behind him.

== Cast ==
- Philip Kwok as Wang Hsu
- Wong Lik as Pan Peng
- Sun Chien as Tang Yu-tung
- Chiang Sheng as Yu Wen-san
- Lo Mang as Chi Chun-peng
- Lu Feng as Chen Chu-kwong
- Choh Seung-wan as courtesan
- Wang Han-chen as Colonel Tseng
- Yang Hsiung as Chang Hsiao-hu
- Yu Tai-ping as Fan Zhang Hua
- Tony Tam as Chen Yao Zong
- Chin Siu-ho as Spearman
