= Shanghai 13 =

1984 Hong Kong-Taiwanese film by Chang Cheh

- Theatrical poster

Chinese name
- Traditional Chinese: 上海灘十三太保
- Simplified Chinese: 上海滩十三太保
Transcriptions
Standard Mandarin
- Hanyu Pinyin: Shàng Hǎi Tān Shí Sān Tài Bǎo
Yue: Cantonese
- Jyutping: Seong6 Hoi2 Taan1 Sap6 Saam1 Taai3 Bou2
- Directed by: Chang Cheh
- Screenplay by: Chang Cheh
- Produced by: Chim Sek-fan
- Starring: Andy Lau; Jimmy Wang Yu; Ti Lung; Chen Kuan-tai; Danny Lee; Bryan Leung; David Chiang; Chiang Sheng; Chi Kuan-chun; Chan Sing; Lu Feng
- Cinematography: James Wu
- Edited by: Lam Sin-leung
- Music by: Wong Mau-san
- Production companies: Hong Kong Chang He Motion Picture; Winners' Workshop Production
- Distributed by: Da Da Film Company
- Release date: 30 April 1984
- Running time: 86 minutes
- Countries: Hong Kong; Taiwan
- Language: Mandarin

Shanghai 13, also known as The Shanghai Thirteen, is a 1984 martial arts film written and directed by Chang Cheh and starring an ensemble cast of notable film stars such as Andy Lau, Jimmy Wang Yu, Ti Lung, Chen Kuan-tai, Danny Lee, Bryan Leung, David Chiang, Chiang Sheng, Chi Kuan-chun, Chan Sing, Lu Feng and more. The film is co-produced by Hong Kong and Taiwan.

Despite not being a Shaw Brothers production, most of the cast and the crew are Shaw alumni.

== Plot ==
During the Second Sino-Japanese War era in China, patriot Mr. Gao (Chiang Ming) is dissatisfied with the traitorous acts of the Reorganized National Government of China and together with thief Black Hat (Jimmy Wang Yu), he steals a traitorous contract set up by the government for the Japanese. Gao plans to bring the contract from Shanghai to Hong Kong and break it to the public, in hopes of exposing the traitorous acts of the Reorganized Government. Gao becomes the assassination target of the Reorganized Government's interior minister Hung Xu-wu (Seung Fung).

In order to ensure a smooth arrival of Mr. Gao and the contract to Hong Kong, Shanghai Tycoon Shen Gang-fu (Chen Kuan-tai) decides to send his underlings, the Shanghai 13, to protect Gao while on his way to the dock. Unexpectedly, there are moles among the 13 men who betray Gao and Shen. With obstacles ahead and pursuers behind, under the condition of obstruction by the traitors, can Mr. Gao successfully arrive to the dock? Are the Shanghai 13 loyal or evil? On the road to the dock, there are murderous traps everywhere and bloody battles appear one after another.

== Cast ==
- Andy Lau as Guan Wei, the Student
- Jimmy Wang Yu as Black Hat
- Ti Lung as Dock boss
- Chen Kuan-tai as Shen Gang-fu
- Danny Lee as Xiao Yang, the Black Sniper
- Bryan Leung as Tao Da-ye, the Millionaire
- David Chiang as Wanderer Ye Bu-fan
- Chiang Sheng as Feng Jin-bang, the Smoker
- Chi Kuan-chun as Big Leopard Yuan Hai
- Chan Sing as Black Eagle Wu Da-li
- Lu Feng as Tiger
- Wong Chung as Laundry owner
- Ricky Cheng as Dagger
- Wong Ching as Bear Lee
- Ga Hoi as Cheater at casino
- Yu Chung-chiu
- Chiang Ming as Mr. Gao
- Chang Feng as Hung Xu-wu
- Yip Fei-yang as Wai Siu Tin
- Chu Hoi-ling as Tao Xiao-mei, Tao's younger sister and Guan's lover
- Peter Chang as Xiao Long
- Lee Chung-yat as Young Master Liang Xiao-xiong
- Tsang Ming-cheong
- Wong Chi-sang
- Wong Tak-sang
- Clement Yip as Lian Sheng
- Sonny Yue
- Cheung Tai-lun
- Yau Siu-lam as Little Leopard Yuan Gang
- Chan Ka-hoi as Wei Xiao-tian

== Action Directors ==
- Lau Kar-wing
- Chiang Sheng
- Lu Feng
- Wong Kwok-chue
- Ricky Cheng Tien-Chi

== See also ==
- Andy Lau filmography
