= Five Deadly Venoms =

1978 Hong Kong film by Chang Cheh

- Hong Kong theatrical release poster

Chinese name
- Traditional Chinese: 五毒
- Simplified Chinese: 五毒
Transcriptions
Standard Mandarin
- Hanyu Pinyin: Wŭ Dú
Yue: Cantonese
- Jyutping: Ng5 Duk6
- Directed by: Chang Cheh; Leung Ting (Action Director)
- Written by: Ni Kuang; Chang Cheh
- Produced by: Runme Shaw
- Starring: Chiang Sheng; Sun Chien; Philip Kwok; Lo Mang; Wai Pak; Lu Feng; Wang Lung-wei; Ku Feng
- Cinematography: Cho Wai Kei; Kung Mu To
- Edited by: Chiang Hsing Lung
- Music by: Frankie Chan
- Production company: Shaw Brothers Studio
- Distributed by: Shaw Brothers Studio
- Release date: 12 August 1978
- Running time: 98 minutes
- Country: Hong Kong
- Languages: Mandarin; Cantonese
- Box office: HK$1,814,610

Five Deadly Venoms (Chinese: 五毒), also known as The Five Venoms, is a 1978 Hong Kong martial arts mystery film directed and co-written by Chang Cheh and produced by Runme Shaw for the Shaw Brothers Studio. It stars Chiang Shieng as Yang Tieh, a martial arts pupil who aims to follow his master's dying wish: to find the new identities of the master's five previous pupils, and kill them if they have turned towards evil. While doing so, Yang stumbles onto a web of murders and investigations involving all five pupils. Each of the master's previous pupils (the titular "Five Deadly Venoms") practices a unique animal-themed style, with the animals being based on the Five Poisonous Creatures of Chinese folklore.

Five Deadly Venoms is considered one of the most popular martial arts films of its era, and has gone on to be considered a cult film. For their roles, Shieng, along with Lu Feng, Sun Chien, Philip Kwok, Wai Pak, and Lo Mang (who portrayed the five fighters), would become collectively dubbed by international audiences as the Venom Mob.

== Plot ==
The dying master of the powerful Poison Clan dispatches his last pupil, Yang Tieh, on a crucial mission. Worried the skills he taught are being used for evil, he orders Yang to locate an old compatriot, Yun, and warn him that the fortune he amassed from the clan's activities is under threat from five of his former pupils, each an expert in his own lethal combat style. Yang must discover their whereabouts and true identities, and decide which, if any, he can trust to join him in his mission.

The five pupils are the Centipede, Snake, Scorpion, Lizard, and Toad. Centipede and Snake were the master's first and second pupils and knew one another. Lizard and Toad were the fourth and fifth pupils respectively and also knew each other, but Scorpion, the third pupil, was unknown to the other four members. Before he dies, the master teaches Yang all the weaknesses of the five styles in order to give him a fighting chance.

Tang Shankui (the Centipede) and Hong Wentong (the Snake) go to the Yun estate in search of the treasure and proceed to butcher Yun and his entire family when he refuses to divulge its location. As they leave, the Centipede is spotted by a witness, who reveals what he had seen to He Yuanxin (the Lizard), a respectable constable. He recruits Li Hao (the Toad) to arrest the Centipede. Meanwhile, the masked Scorpion investigates the scene and finds the true location of the treasure hidden in a candle broken during the struggle. When Centipede is arrested and charged with the Yun family murders, the Snake and the still masked Scorpion collude together to frame the Toad instead.

They bribe the judge Justice Wang into sending the Lizard away on government business while the Snake pays off another constable to make the witness commit perjury. At the Centipede's trial, Yang watches as the witness now testifies against the Toad as having been present at the scene of the crime. The Toad is tortured by Wang in attempt to force a confession but his body is invulnerable to the devices used. However, the unseen Scorpion cripples him by throwing a pair of darts at his weak points located behind his ears. Now vulnerable, the Toad is subjected to further torture, this time sustaining heavy injuries from which he passes out. His signature is then forged on a confession.

The Centipede is acquitted and goes free whilst the Toad is suffocated to death and hanged by his jailers to resemble suicide. The Centipede and the Snake kill all those they bribed in order to tie up any loose ends but are both seen by two constables, who find the Lizard and relay the events that have happened, much to his horror. Yang, having followed the men, continues to spectate and sees the Lizard's superior, Chief Constable Ma, urging him to forget the issue. The Lizard however, refuses and vows to bring his compatriot's killers to justice. Yang, impressed at his sense of righteousness, finally reveals himself and offers to help. Though hesitant at first, the Lizard eventually agrees and the pair begin training to defeat the other students by devising ways to exploit their weaknesses. On the day they prepare to confront the Centipede and the Snake, Ma arrives seeking to join them.

During the fight, the Snake grows suspicious of Ma and when Yang and the Lizard immobilize him, implores him to help. Ma reveals himself to be the elusive Scorpion but instead of helping the Snake, fatally injures him using the same projectiles that brought down the Toad. He convinces the Centipede into helping him, promising to share the Yun family treasure with him. Yang and the Lizard eventually manage to defeat the Centipede while the Snake helps kill the Scorpion before dying from his wounds. Yang and the Lizard retrieve the map from the Scorpion's corpse, vowing to use the fortune for good and restore the reputation of the Poison Clan.

== Cast ==
- Chiang Sheng as Yang Tieh
- Sun Chien as Chief Constable Ma, the Scorpion
- Philip Kwok as Constable He Yuanxin, the Lizard
- Lo Mang as Li Hao, the Toad
- Wai Pak as Hong Wentong, the Snake
- Lu Feng as Tang Shankui, the Centipede, also nicknamed 'thousand hands'
- Johnny Wang as Justice Wang
- Ku Feng as Yun
- Dick Wei as the dying head of the Poison Clan

== Styles ==
Fighting styles and choreography by action director Leung Ting.

- Number 1: Centipede – a blend of defensive and offensive posturing focusing on delivering fast and lethal strikes, such that the practitioner seems to have many limbs like the style's inspiration.
- Number 2: Snake – unlike the traditional snake style, this iteration sees the user attack and defend by using their left hand as the "head" and the right the "tail", and was specifically designed by Leung Ting, one of the film's action directors.
- Number 3: Scorpion – a style relying on kicks (the "stinger") while the hands mimic the scorpion's pincers. Although never confirmed, it's possible this style also teaches users how to use throwing weapons.
- Number 4: Lizard – placing an emphasis on mobility, users of the Lizard style can walk up and vertically stand on walls, even being able to fight comfortably from such a position and maneuvering from one surface to another.
- Number 5: Toad – through use of the Toad Style, a practitioner can make themselves invulnerable to just about any form of damage (such as slashing and piercing-based attacks). The weakness of this style is that any master of the Toad Style has a "weak spot" that, when punctured, drains him/her of all the style's benefits, most notably their iron body.

== Reception ==
=== Contemporary reception ===
The film enjoyed popularity overseas particularly in North America. Former marketing manager of Tai Seng Films, Frank Djeng, attributed the film's success in the United States as a result of its unique and atypical martial arts styles, and the fact that the Venoms were at the time "nothing like any martial arts performers US audiences had seen before". In the same article, film historian Grady Hendrix credited the film's international success to its publicity via television packages which enabled its rise in popularity amongst a younger audience.

=== Retrospective assessments ===
On the review aggregator website Rotten Tomatoes, the film holds an approval rating of 80% based on five reviews, with an average rating of 6.3/10.

In 2003, Five Deadly Venoms was ranked number 11 on Entertainment Weekly's Top 50 Cult Films list.

In 2009, author John Charles gave the film a score of 8 out of 10, praising the five animal styles showcased and the sequences that introduce each of them, and writing: "Those who dismiss kung fu films as being mindless and plotless have obviously not seen this one, which features a mystery as intricate and intriguing as what one finds in mainstream thrillers."

== Home media ==
Five Deadly Venoms was released on DVD by The Weinstein Company's Asian label, Dragon Dynasty, on 18 August 2009. In May 2011, Dragon Dynasty and Celestial Pictures released the film on Blu-ray. In 2016, the film was made available on streaming platforms iTunes, Hulu, Google Play, Microsoft Movies, Amazon, YouTube, and Netflix by Celestial Pictures.

On 28 December 2021, Arrow Video released Five Deadly Venoms on Blu-ray as part of the Shawscope Volume One boxed set.

== In popular culture ==
Five Deadly Venoms is referenced frequently in the works of the Wu-Tang Clan. Dialogue from the film is sampled in the songs "Da Mystery of Chessboxin'" from Enter the Wu-Tang (36 Chambers) (1993) and "Intro (Shaolin Finger Jab)" from The W (2000). The movie is also sampled in songs appearing on solo albums by Wu-Tang Clan members: "Snakes" from Return to the 36 Chambers: The Dirty Version (1995) by Ol' Dirty Bastard, and "Born Chamber (Intro)" from No Said Date (2004) by Masta Killa. An all-female hip hop group affiliated with the Wu-Tang Clan, formed in 1997, was known as Deadly Venoms (originally called Five Deadly Venoms before the departure of one of the five members).

Five Deadly Venoms also inspired writer-director Quentin Tarantino in his 2003 film Kill Bill, which features a team of five assassins known as the Deadly Viper Assassination Squad, as well as the Furious Five, a group of animal kung fu masters in Kung Fu Panda.

== Remake ==
In 2006, a remake of the film was announced with Kirk Wong directing and Celestial Pictures producing. Andy Lau was reported to be financing and starring in the remake, but in 2007 withdrew due to other film commitments and it was announced his role would be replaced by Jay Chou. The new Venom lineup was said to include Chou, Edison Chen, Huang Xiaoming, Wu Jing, Gordon Liu, and American actress Maggie Q, who was set to star as a new female spider Venom.

Original Five Deadly Venoms actors Philip Kwok and Lu Feng have expressed interest in a remake.

== See also ==
- Cinema of Hong Kong
- List of Hong Kong films of 1978
- Venom Mob
