= House of Traps =

1982 Hong Kong film by Chang Cheh

- Movie poster

Chinese name
- Traditional Chinese: 沖霄樓
- Simplified Chinese: 冲霄楼
Transcriptions
Standard Mandarin
- Hanyu Pinyin: Chōng Xiāo Lóu
Yue: Cantonese
- Jyutping: Cung^{1} Siu^{1} Lau^{4}
- Directed by: Chang Cheh
- Written by: Chang Cheh; I Kuang
- Produced by: Mona Fong
- Starring: Philip Kwok; Chin Siu-ho; Lung Tien-hsiang; Sun Chien; Ngaai Fei
- Cinematography: Tsao Hui-chi
- Edited by: Chiang Hsing-lung; Li Yen-hai
- Music by: Eddie H. Wang
- Production company: Shaw Brothers Studio
- Distributed by: Shaw Brothers Studio
- Release date: 9 January 1982 (Hong Kong)
- Running time: 95 minutes
- Country: Hong Kong
- Language: Mandarin

House of Traps is a 1982 Shaw Brothers film directed by Chang Cheh, starring the Venom Mob. The story is based on the 19th-century novel The Seven Heroes and Five Gallants.

== Plot ==
The corrupt Prince Zhao is planning a revolt to get revenge on his uncle, the emperor. The prince puts together a list of his co-conspirators pledging their allegiance to his plot and keeps it locked away in the infamous House of Traps, a place where high-level individuals' most valuable items are kept safe from bandits, thieves, or their enemies. The facility consists of a system of multiple traps, with layered redundancies built in that even the most skilled martial artists would have difficulty navigating or surviving. To safely access any of the valuables stored at the top, the trap system must be deactivated outside of the house using a special key, in which case, the interested party is safely escorted to either store or retrieve their item(s). In the case that the house is infiltrated by an unauthorized individual, security personnel are alerted and the same special key is used to make the traps active. Needless to say, it is a one-way trip for whatever infiltrator breaks into the house. Several conspirators show their allegiance to the prince by bringing valuable items stolen from the emperor, and these items ultimately end up being stored in the House of Traps.

Sensing the revolt, the emperor not only sends a spy to have one of his "stolen" items placed in the House of Traps to test its security, but he sends an envoy, inspector Yan, to find out what is going on. While on his travels to confront the prince, he is met with several assassination attempts, but these are foiled by a skilled martial artist that is a member of the Five Rats, heroes that are loyal to the emperor, and is accompanied by him during his travels. When killed trying to obtain the list from the House of Traps, his brothers, the four remaining of the Five Rats get involved and become determined to avenge their brother and foil the conspiracy against the emperor. Posing as workers, acrobats, and other disguises, the surviving Rats infiltrate Prince Zhao's residence shortly before his birthday. Not only do they completely sabotage the House of Traps so it can be safely navigated, but they also engage in a final showdown between the prince and his accomplices.

== Cast ==
Cast	Role	Description
Sun Chien	Yan Chunmin	Inspector
Lau Fong-sai	Yumo	Yan Chunmin's servant
Ngaai Fei	Zhao Jue	Prince of Xiangyang
Philip Kwok	Zhi Hua	"Black Demon Fox"
Chin Siu-ho	Bai Yutang	"Brocade-Coated Rat", 5th sworn brother
Chu Ko	Lu Fang	"Sky-Penetrating Rat", 1st sworn brother
Yu Tai-ping	Han Zhang	"Earth-Piercing Rat", 2nd sworn brother
Cheng Tien-chi	Xu Qing	"Mountain-Boring Rat", 3rd sworn brother
Chiang Sheng	Jiang Ping	"River-Overturning Rat", 4th sworn brother
Lung Tien-hsiang	Shen Zhongyuan	"Little Zhuge"
Yau Lee	Ai Hu	"Little Hero"
Lu Feng	Hua Chong	"Butterfly"
Wong Lik	Deng Che	"Sick Giant"

== Production notes ==
House of Traps was previously considered one of the rarest Venom films, as it was only available on poor VHS and VCD formats, but was later remastered and released on DVD in September 2008 by Image Entertainment. The DVD includes the original Mandarin language soundtrack with subtitles, as well as an English-dubbed soundtrack. The DVD is from the Shaw Brothers Collection series, which is distributed under the Celestial Pictures banner of Image Entertainment.

Despite the DVD release, the film falls under WTO regulations for fair-use and free distribution. Celestial's release is approximately 20 minutes shorter than the VHS and VCD versions, as many of the most damaged frames were cut entirely. The Celestial version of the film, under Chinese law, is materially different enough to be classified as a new work and is copyrighted as such. Only a handful of VHS originals are known to exist.
