= Flag of Iron =

1980 Hong Kong film by Chang Cheh

The Flag of Iron
- DVD cover
- Directed by: Chang Cheh
- Written by: Chang Cheh; Ni Kuang
- Produced by: Run Run Shaw; Mona Fong
- Starring: Kuo Chui; Chiang Sheng; Wang Li; Lu Feng; Lung Tung Sheng
- Cinematography: Cho Wai-Kei
- Edited by: Chiang Hsing-Lung
- Music by: Eddie H. Wang
- Distributed by: Shaw Brothers Studio
- Release date: 14 August 1980
- Running time: 113 minutes
- Country: Hong Kong
- Language: Mandarin

Flag Of Iron is a 1980 Shaw Brothers kung fu film directed by Chang Cheh and starring the Venom Mob. In 2022 the film received renewed interest after receiving a new western release by 88 Films.

== Plot ==
The ‘Iron Flag’ clan is in constant conflict with its rivals, the ‘Eagles’, who oversee various illegal activities in the town. To resolve these matters, the chiefs of both clans agree to meet in person, accompanied by their best fighters. The Iron Flag clan's leaders suspect that the Eagles will not act in good faith, so, at the behest of ‘Iron Tiger’ Tsao Feng (Lu Feng), they invite the hitman-for-hire, known as the ‘Spearman’ (Lung Tung Sheng) as back-up in case things go wrong.

Things indeed go sour and not only is the chief of the Eagles murdered, but so is the chief of the Iron Flag, both with spear tips in their backs from an unknown assailant. Confusion ensues as no one knows who has just committed these murders, but the mysterious Spearman looks on completely unfazed. With the chief of the Iron Flag dead, debate begins about who should be the new chief, which comes down to a choice between Tsao Feng or ‘Iron Leopard’ Brother Lo (Kuo Chui), both with their own group of supporters. When the police arrive at Iron Flag headquarters, no one knows who is responsible for what since there are no suspects, but nevertheless, the cops want to arrest someone to get the case settled quickly. Eventually, the police offer that while they will not outright charge someone with murder, at least one of the Iron Flag members must take responsibility for what occurred and leave town immediately. Brother Lo agrees to take responsibility and leave town, at the protest of both Tsao Feng and his close friend, ‘Iron Monkey’ Yuan Lang (Chiang Sheng). Tsao Feng promises to send him money and any other support that he needs while he's away.

Time passes, and Brother Lo is now a busser at a tavern, routinely bullied by the owner and it's two waiters. The money that was promised to him never arrives, but what does is various killers attempting to take his life. Brother Lo uses just enough of his martial arts to protect himself and dispatch of his would-be killers without attracting any unwanted attention. Yuan Lang finds Brother Lo working at the tavern and tells him how things have gotten worse back home and that he has left the Iron Flag after Tsao Feng took over both the Iron Flag, and the Eagles (as well as their criminal ventures), much to Brother Lo’s disbelief. The two also ponder about who exactly wants Brother Lo dead and keeps hiring assassins. In one of the final attempts on Brother Lo's life, the mysterious Spearman arrives again, only this time to intervene on Brother Lo's behalf. The Spearman confesses to Brother Lo and Yuan Lang that he killed their chief, but he was hired to do so by Tsao Feng. Realizing that the Iron Flag chief was a good man, The Spearman not only regrets what he’ did, but he also suspects that Tsao Feng is the one that wants Brother Lo dead, but won't do it himself since Brother Lo is still respected among the ranks of the Iron Flag. Brother Lo still remains somewhat skeptical of what Tsao Feng has been accused of by both Yuan Lang and the Spearman, nevertheless, he, Yuan Lang, and the Spearman return to town to not only gather more evidence of Tsao Feng’s alleged deeds, but also to take revenge for their murdered chief if all of the accusations turns out to be true.

== Cast ==
- Kuo Chui as 'Iron Leopard' Lo Hsin
- Chiang Sheng as 'Iron Monkey' Yuan Lang
- Wang Li as Kao Tung
- Lu Feng as 'Iron Tiger' Tsao Feng
- Lung Tung Sheng as 'The Spearman' Yen Hsiu
