= Legend of the Fox =

1980 Hong Kong film by Chang Cheh

- DVD cover art
- 飛狐外傳
- Directed by: Chang Cheh
- Screenplay by: Ni Kuang
- Based on: The Young Flying Fox by Jin Yong
- Produced by: Run Run Shaw
- Starring: Chin Siu-ho; Philip Kwok; Lu Feng; Chiang Sheng; Wang Li
- Cinematography: Cho Wai-kei
- Edited by: Chiang Hsing-lung; Lee Yim-hoi
- Music by: Eddie H. Wang
- Production company: Shaw Brothers Studio
- Distributed by: Celestial Pictures
- Release date: 15 November 1980
- Running time: 122 minutes
- Country: Hong Kong
- Language: Mandarin

Legend of the Fox (飛狐外傳), also known as Legend of a Fox, is a 1980 Hong Kong wuxia film adapted from the novel The Young Flying Fox by Jin Yong. It was produced by the Shaw Brothers Studio, directed by Chang Cheh and starred the Venom Mob. The film used to be one of the most rare Venom Mob martial arts film available, but has been digitally remastered and released by Celestial Pictures.

== Synopsis ==
Eighteen years ago, the swordsmen Hu Yidao and Miao Renfeng had engaged in a duel which had resulted in Hu Yidao's death after he sustained a minor cut. It turned out that the blade had been smeared with poison by Tian Guinong, who hoped the two swordsmen would kill each other. Tian Guinong also seduced Miao Renfeng's wife Nan Lan, leading her to abandon her husband and daughter Miao Ruolan. Tian Guinong also uses poison later to cause Miao Renfeng to be temporarily blinded. Hu Fei, Hu Yidao's son, initially seeks vengeance on Miao Renfeng for his father's death, but decides to help Miao find a cure. During this time, Hu Fei encounters Cheng Lingsu, the successor to a famous physician, and falls in love with her.

== Cast ==
- Chin Siu-ho as Hu Fei
- Lu Feng as Hu Yidao
- Philip Kwok as Miao Renfeng
- Wong Man-yee as Cheng Lingsu
- Chiang Sheng as Tian Guinong
- Helen Poon as Hu Yidao's wife
- Choh Seung-wan as Nan Lan
- Wang Li as Shi Wanchen
- Leung Chi-hung as Xue Que
- Yu Tai-ping as Yan Ji
- Lai Yau-hing as Ping Asi
- Lau Fong-sai as Liu Hezhen
- Chow Kin-ping as Murong Jingyue
- Tony Tam Chun-to as Jiang Tieshan
- Hung Fung as Shang Jianming
- Siao Yuk as Shang Baozhen
- Lui Hung as Lady Shang
- Leung Cheuk-kwan as Zhang Feixiong
- Chan Shu-kei as Zhong Zhaoying
- Chan Hon-kwong as Zhong Zhaowen
