= Black Society =

Black Society may refer to:

- Black Society trilogy, a 1995–1999 film trilogy by Takashi Miike
- Black Society (album), a 2008 album by Arthemis
