= Crippled Avengers =

1978 Hong Kong film by Chang Cheh

- Film poster

Chinese name
- Traditional Chinese: 残缺
- Simplified Chinese: 残缺
Transcriptions
Standard Mandarin
- Hanyu Pinyin: Cánquē
Yue: Cantonese
- Jyutping: Caan4 Kyut3
- Directed by: Chang Cheh
- Screenplay by: Chang Cheh; Ni Kuang
- Produced by: Mona Fong
- Starring: Chen Kuan-tai; Chiang Sheng; Kuo Chui; Lo Mang; Lu Feng; Sun Chien; Johnny Wang
- Cinematography: Tsao Hui-chi
- Edited by: Chiang Hsing-Lung
- Music by: Chen Yung-Yu
- Production company: Shaw Brothers Studio
- Distributed by: Shaw Brothers Studio
- Release date: 21 December 1978 (Hong Kong)
- Running time: 100 minutes
- Country: Hong Kong
- Language: Mandarin

Crippled Avengers (Chinese: 残缺; alternately titled Avengers Handicapped) is a 1978 Shaw Brothers kung fu film directed by Chang Cheh and starring four members of the Venom Mob. It was released in North America as Mortal Combat and The Return of the 5 Deadly Venoms. The film follows four martial artists on their journey to seek justice against a tyrannical martial arts master Dao Tian-du (Chen Kuan-tai) and his son Dao Chang (Lu Feng).

== Plot ==
Dao Tian-du (Chen Kuan-tai), styled the Black Tiger, is renowned for his skill in tiger-style kung fu but has also accrued a rather poor reputation for his tyranny and cruelty to the extent the local populace are terrified to speak out against him. When he is absent one day, his estate is attacked by members of an enemy clan, the Tian Nan Tiger sect, who take out their hatred on his wife and young son, Dao Chang. Tian-du returns to find his wife dead with her legs cut off and Chang with both arms dismembered. Although he murders the assailants, the incident only fuels his cruelty. He later has prosthetic arms fitted for Chang and for the next several years, trains and passes his techniques to him. Years later, he kidnaps the sons of the Tian Nan Tiger fighters, promising their freedom if they can best the now adult Chang (Lu Feng) in a fight. Chang easily overpowers them but deliberately breaks their limbs while his father holds a feast later in celebration.

While at a local inn with their keeper Wan (Johnny Wang) Tian-du catches two men laughing at Chang's hands and has Wan viciously beat them. This is witnessed by the local blacksmith, Wei Jia-jie (Lo Mang), who is unafraid to speak out against Tian-du's behavior and is praised by a travelling salesman, Chen Shuen (Philip Kwok), watching nearby. In retaliation, Chang blinds Chen and Wei is forced to drink a liquid that renders him mute. When he remains defiant, Tian-du beats him until he is left deaf. When a young man named Hu Ah-kue (Sun Chien) accidentally bumps into Chang, Tian-du has his men cut off his legs as punishment. Both Chen and Hu seek shelter at Wei's smithy where Wei promises to help look after them. Wan however, learns of this and threatens the townspeople from buying anything at his forge, effectively severing his income. Later, Chen and Hu are saved by a swordsman named Wang Yi (Chiang Sheng) when they are harassed by vandals. Upon learning the truth behind the men's injuries, Wang goes to the Dao estate seeking justice. However, he is ultimately captured and tortured by Wan and when he returns to the smithy, Wei, Chen, and Hu find he has been reduced to a giggly, child-like state. Hu retrieves a letter from Wang's master Li Jing Ying (Ching Miao) on his person and together with Chen, Wang, and Wei, they travel to find him in hopes he can train them so they can put an end to Dao Tian-du and Dao Chang's tyranny. Li agrees and for the next three years, trains them: Hu is given prosthetic legs which he learns to fight in, Chen learns to wield iron hoops and use his hearing to locate his targets, and Wei trains his sight to heighten the precision and power of his blows. Wang remains proficient in his skills but constantly interrupts Hu and Chen, who later learn to use his interference to aid in their training.

The four return to town on Dao Tian-du's 45th birthday to exact their revenge. Chen later confronts Wan at the same inn they first crossed paths in and easily defeats him and his men. Wan hires martial artist Jiu Gao Feng (Yang Hsiung) to hold them off in hopes Tian-du does not find out about the four men's return, but Jiu is soundly beaten and Tian-du nonetheless discovers the truth. The four men arrive at the Dao estate where Wan has mirrors and drums set up to disorient Chen and Wei. Wang however, destroys them allowing Chen and Wei to kill Wan and charge inside whereupon Chen and Wang take on Chang whilst Wei and Hu take on Dao Tian-du. Wang gives Chen a chance to blindside Chang whilst allowing himself be mortally wounded in the process. Chen strangles Chang to death but when he goes to Wang, he succumbs to his injuries. Chen joins Wei and Hu against the more seasoned fighter Tian-du. Together, they immobilize him and Hu delivers a single kick to his chest, killing him. Having at last sought justice against Dao Tian-du and Dao Chang, the three men depart.

== Cast ==
- Chen Kuan-tai as Black Tiger Dao Tian-du
- Philip Kwok as Chen Shuen
- Lo Mang as Wei Jia-jie
- Sun Chien as Hu Ah-kue
- Chiang Sheng as Wang Yi
- Lu Feng as Dao Chang
- Johnny Wang as Keeper Wan
- Yang Hsiung as Master Jiu Gao Feng
- Yu Tai-Ping as Archer Lin
- Tony Tam as Master Law Bo
- Ching Miao as Master Li Jing Ying
- Helen Poon as Du's wife
- Dick Wei as Tian Nan Tiger #1
- Jamie Luk as Tian Nan Tiger #2
- Stewart Tam as Tian Nan Tiger #3

== Reception ==
Ian Jane of DVD Talk rated it 4.5/5 stars and wrote, "With heroes you can cheer for and bad guys evil enough to hiss at, The Return Of The 5 Deadly Venoms is top tier old school martial arts mayhem at its best." Bill Palmer, Karen Palmer, and Richard Meyers wrote in The Martial Arts Encyclopedia, "The story is somewhat unusual, and there are plenty of excellently choreographed fight scenes."
