= Invincible Shaolin =

1978 Hong Kong film by Chang Cheh

- DVD cover

Chinese name
- Traditional Chinese: 南少林與北少林
- Simplified Chinese: 南少林与北少林
Transcriptions
Standard Mandarin
- Hanyu Pinyin: Nán Shàolín Yǔ Běi Shàolín
Yue: Cantonese
- Jyutping: Naam4 Siu2 Lam4 Jyu5 Bak1 Siu2 Lam4
- Directed by: Chang Cheh; Leung Ting (Action Director)
- Written by: Chang Cheh; Ni Kuang
- Produced by: Sir Run Run Shaw
- Starring: Lu Feng; Sun Chien; Chiang Sheng; Wai Pak; Kuo Chui; Lo Mang
- Cinematography: Cho Wai-Kei
- Edited by: Chiang Hsing-Lung
- Music by: Frankie Chan
- Production company: Shaw Brothers Studio
- Distributed by: Shaw Brothers Studio
- Release date: 19 November 1978
- Running time: 106 minutes
- Country: Hong Kong
- Language: Mandarin

Invincible Shaolin (Chinese: 南少林與北少林), alternatively titled The Unbeatable Dragon, Shaolin Bloodshed , and North Shaolin vs. South Shaolin, is a 1978 Hong Kong martial arts film directed by Chang Cheh and starring the Venom Mob. The movie chronicles one of Chang's tales of Shaolin's historic rivalries with the Qing Dynasty. It is one of the few Venom films featuring Wai Pak (the Snake).

== Plot ==
Qing general Pu (Johnny Wang) invites Northern Shaolin martial arts experts Bao Shanxiong of the Iron Palm (Lu Feng), Xu Fang of the Whirling Kicks (Sun Chien), and Yang Zhongfei of the Butterfly Flail (Chiang Sheng) to his estate to train the imperial Qing troops. Although all three are secretly Ming loyalists, they reluctantly agree due to the decision having been officiated by royal decree. To test their mettle, Pu pits them against the troops' existing trainers, three Southern Shaolin experts whom Bao, Xu, and Yang decisively triumph over. That night, Pu visits the South Shaolin fighters and murders them, using blows to deliver fatal internal injuries. Pu reveals his true intentions to the dying men: to rid the Qing Empire of the Shaolin factions, perceived as threats to the autocracy of the ruling Manchus, by stirring up internal conflict amongst them and ultimately have the Northern and Southern sides kill one another. Pu has his subordinate, Captain Hua Shun (Suen Shu-pei) bring news of the deaths to the Southern Shaolin school and instructs Hua to frame the Northerners. The master, Mai Qi (Chan Shen) and his sons Mai Yuan (Yang Hsiung) and Mai Feng (Wai Pak) are horrified at the brutality of the deaths. When Bao, Xu, and Yang learn of the deaths, they are in disbelief that their blows could have caused their compatriots' demise and go to the Southern Shaolin school in attempt to find out the truth. Mai, however, having believed Hua's ruse, refuses to listen or cooperate. Vowing revenge, Mai's eldest son, Yuan, accompanied by two Southern disciples, challenge Bao, Xu, and Yang to a rematch. Although Xu tries persuading both sides to hold back, two of the Southern fighters are killed: one by Bao and the second being Yuan whom Xu inadvertently kills when he blindsides him. The remaining disciple is beaten by Yang and allowed to leave, but later commits suicide.

Mai Feng swears vengeance for his brother and compatriots and is sent to study Wing Chun to counter Xu's fighting style. Mai Qi enlists the help of two of his strongest disciples, He Yingwu (Phillip Kwok) and Zhang Cheng (Lo Mang). While he teaches He the staff, Zhang is sent to learn the Southern Mantis style, techniques which respectively counter Yang's Butterfly Flail and Bao's Iron Palm. Meanwhile, Hua confides with Pu about the worsening relations between the two Shaolin factions, much to the latter's delight. In the following months, He, Zhang, and Mai commence their grueling training to seek vengeance for their fallen compatriots, while Bao, Xu, and Yang begin training the Qing troops. Xu meanwhile, begins to suspect something has run afoul after learning that the first three Southern fighters died of internal wounds, injuries neither he, Bao, nor Yang could have inflicted. He suspects the true killer is someone within Pu's estate, with Pu and Captain Hua being the most likely culprits. During this time, the three men begin courting three women: Xu develops a relationship with Xiu Yun (Kara Hui), a servant girl of Pu's, and Bao and Yang pursue two food vendors, the latter who share in their disdain of the Manchus. When it is announced that Xu intends to wed Xiu Yin, the news is overheard by Hua. He, Zhang, and Mai later complete their training and swear an oath with Mai Qi to bring justice to Bao, Xu, and Yang. Mai Qi, having overexerted himself to teach He, dies moments after swearing to never submit to the Manchus. Hua later reports his death as well as Xu's marriage to Pu. The two see this as an opportunity to control Xu as he remains the most wary and difficult to fool of the three Northern fighters. Pu makes Xiu Yin his adopted daughter, asserting power over Xu by becoming his father-in-law. In addition, officiation of his marriage into an elite Manchu family would cause further uproar amongst the feuding Shaolin disciples. Hua is again sent to relay the news.

Sure enough, He, Zhang, and Mai, still in mourning, are infuriated and on the day Pu adopts Xiu Yin, arrive at the general's estate to challenge Bao, Xu, and Yang, who willingly accept. They each face off using their newfound techniques to counter the respective styles, with He fighting Yang, Zhang fighting Bao, and Mai Xu. Mai succeeds in using Wing Chun to subvert Xu's attacks and deals a mortal blow. Willing to accept his fate, Xu reveals the truth of Mai's brother's death to him, leading to Mai doubting Hua's words. The two realize they have been deceived but are too late to stop the fighting, Bao and Yang having already sustained wounds. He nonetheless realizes they have been tricked when Yang refuses to harm him. Pu, upon seeing his ploy has failed, strikes He revealing his attack and himself as the true killer of the Shaolin disciples. Qing troops arrive to kill them but He urges Zhang and Mai to escape to reveal Pu's treachery as well as ensure the survival of Shaolin martial arts. Bao and Xu sacrifice themselves fighting off the Qing soldiers while Yang is riddled with arrows defending Zhang and Mai. He fights off against Pu and both are impaled on the ends of his staff. Though He and Yang subsequently die from their injuries, they are successful in enabling Zhang and Mai to escape to safety.

== Cast ==
- Lu Feng as Bao Shanxiong
- Sun Chien as Xu Fang
- Chiang Sheng as Yang Zhongfei
- Lo Mang as Zhang Cheng
- Phillip Kwok as He Yingwu
- Wai Pak as Mai Feng
- Johnny Wang as General Pu
- Suen Shu-Pei as Captain Hua Shun
- Chan Shen as South Shaolin Master Mai Qi
- Wong Ching-Ho as Wing Chun Master Liang
- Ching Miao as Southern Praying Mantis Master Zhu Ming
- Niu Niu as Chen Cui Ying
- Yau Chui-Ling as Xiaoling
- Kara Hui as Xiu Yin
- Dick Wei as South Shaolin fighter
- Yu Tai-Ping as South Shaolin fighter
- Suen San-Cheung as South Shaolin fighter
- Siu Yuk-Lung as South Shaolin fighter Di Li
- Tony Tam as South Shaolin fighter Nu Qiang
- Yang Hsiung as Mai Yuan
