= Masked Avengers (film) =

1981 Hong Kong film by Chang Cheh

- Film poster
- Directed by: Chang Cheh
- Screenplay by: Chang Cheh; Ni Kuang
- Produced by: Mona Fong; Chang Cheh
- Starring: Philip Kwok; Lu Feng; Chiang Sheng; Chu Ko; Chin Siu-Ho; Wang Li
- Cinematography: Cho Wai-Kei
- Edited by: Chiang Hsing-lung
- Music by: Eddie Wang
- Production company: Shaw Brothers Studio
- Distributed by: Shaw Brothers Studio
- Release date: 15 May 1981 (Hong Kong)
- Running time: 92 minutes
- Country: Hong Kong
- Language: Mandarin

Masked Avengers is a Shaw Brothers film directed by Chang Cheh and produced by Mona Fong. It is one of the later Venom Mob films which no longer starred Sun Chien or Lo Mang, who were replaced by new Venom members Wang Li and Chu Ko. It also gave a starring role to younger member Chin Siu-Ho. This, along with House of Traps and Five Element Ninjas is one of the more violent and darker-themed Shaw Brothers films.

== Plot ==
A ruthless gang of killers-for-hire terrorize the countryside, their inherent brutality is usually followed by raping and killing whoever they are paid to take out (or whoever crosses their paths). They target and mortally injure a member of Chi San Yuens (Chiang Sheng) protective escort party and group of martial arts experts. Chi and his men are trying to find the gang and put an end to their reign of terror. Before dying, the (unnamed) individual tells Chi San Yuen that the gang members wear masks, their choice of weapon is the trident, and their leader wears a gold mask.

Cut to a scene where the masked gang is celebrating the capture of two of the last remaining members of an entire family they were hired to kill. The two helpless men vow to get revenge on the gang, but it turns out to be nothing but empty threats as they are shown the large sum of taels that was paid for their deaths before they are finally impaled with multiple tridents.

All is not lost as Chi San Yuen and his men have a lead on where the gang may have their headquarters. A town full of famous, wealthy men, the types who would be able to bankroll a gang. One of these men is Lin Yung Chi (Lu Feng), who greets Chang Chung (Chin Siu-Ho) as he escorts Lin to an inn that the escort party has commandeered as a base of operations. Lin Yung Chi greets the party with open arms, offers them to stay at his residence, and has dinner delivered. He is confused as to why they suspect that a gang is operating in such a small town. After he again insists that they stay at his residence, Chi San Yuen refuses as he wants his men to stick together. While the group enjoys their meal, Chi San Yuen mentions several families that were killed by the gang, whose surviving relatives are now some of his men. One tells the story of how his brother and sister were ambushed by the gang. While his brother was killed, his sister was kidnapped. Some investigating pointed to the suspects operating out of that town.

Kao Yao (Phillip Kwok), the inns cook, is caught eavesdropping on the conversation and several members of the escort party become hostile towards him, primarily Liang Yung (Chu Ko). When he is physically assaulted, he displays some martial arts prowess, which catches the attention of both Chang Chung and Lin Yung Chi (who believes that he's met this cook before). Chang Chung later befriends Kao Yao as he believes that he's "more than just a cook" but not directly involved with the gang. For a time, this attempt at friendship is one-sided as Kao Yao is rather standoffish and doesn't reveal anything about himself other than being a cook. On one evening, two gang members wearing gold masks confront Kao Yao, claiming to have finally found him. Kao claims to not know them while they search his belongings, but they are scared off when Chang approaches the kitchen to visit Kao.

Lin Yung Chi states that he will spend the night at the inn, which his servants are not too happy with. While Lin is asleep, Chi San Yuen orders one of his men to search Lins house for any evidence of gang activity. While searching, he is attacked and left for dead near the inn by several members of the gang, one of which is wearing a gold mask. Members of the gang appear at the inn, when they attempt to escape, they are killed by Chang, with help from Kao Yao. When they're unmasked, Lin Yung Chi claims that he doesn't recognize the men and gives the name of a man who might be the leader of the gang, Fong Su Kwong (Wang Li). While investigating Fong Su Kwong, several more members of the escort party are killed by a gang member wearing a gold mask. This turn of events leads Chi San Yuen to believe that Lin and/or Fong Su Kwong may or may not be the leader(s) of the gang, as the gang may have more than one leader.

During a meeting between Chi San Yuen, Lin and Fong Su Kwong, both deny involvement by accusing the other of being the gangs leader. At the same instant, another escort party member is attacked by a gang member wearing a gold mask. When Liang Yung (Chu Ko) comes to help, the fatally injured man points at Liang before he succumbs to his injuries. With both Lin and Fong Su Kwong in attendance, evidence leads away from them and to a third possible suspect, who Liang Yung accuses of being the cook, Kao Yao. Chi San Yuen and Liang Yung search through Kao's belongings and find both a gold trident and a gold mask, but Chang Chung comes to the defense of his friend by telling them that he purposely hid them from Kao Yao, and that Kao only uses them to spy on the gang. Once everyone leaves, Lin and Fong Su Kwong visit the kitchen and inquire if they're both looking for "an old friend", which both confirm that they are.

Chi San Yuen and Liang Yung confront and attack Kao. They eventually retreat after someone (Chang Chung) tosses Kao a trident from behind the trees to defend himself, Chang is then accused by Liang of helping Kao. Despite this, Chi San Yuen doesn't believe that Kao is one of the masked killers and doesn't mind giving him the opportunity to tell his side of the story. When Kao doesn't return, Chang goes looking for him and is attacked by one of the gang, wearing a gold mask. The gang member retreats and removes his mask, revealing that's Kao Yao. Kao tells Chang that he was the gangs #2 chief and was there when one of the groups brother and sister were ambushed by the gang. He states that he left once the gang resorted to raping women, killing minors, and overall, killing indiscriminately. He tells Chang the identities of the #1 and #3 chiefs (Lin Yung Chi and Fong Su Kwong) but he doesn't know who the new #2 is that replaced him, though he witnessed #2 collect his payment for a murder. Finally, Kao reveals where the gangs base is located and instructs Chang to inform Chi to ambush them at the old temple.

Once Kao leaves, Chang sits and collects his thoughts until suddenly, he's attacked again by a gold mask-wearing gang member. Believing it's Kao again, he doesn't take the fight too seriously until two more "chiefs" appear. Realizing it's the real chiefs, he states #1 and #3's names, respectively, which causes them to remove their masks. He slices #2's mask in half, revealing that the new #2 is none other than Liang Yung. Though he puts up a decent fight, Chang is overwhelmed by the three and is mortally wounded, living just long enough to tell Kao (who finds him impaled to a tree) who the new #2 is.

Liang Yung returns to the escort group and convinces Chi San Yuen to send some of his men into traps, since Chi isn't aware that he's a spy. Kao returns to the inn and tells Chi San Yuen the identities of the chiefs (including the one standing next to him). Liang Yung tries to put up an argument until he states that Chang is dead, which Kao never mentioned. Chi San Yuen is finally convinced that Kao is telling the truth once Kao asks the (actually deceased) Chang to come in the inn and tell everyone who the other chief is. Chi and his men attack Liang Yung, who manages to escape back to the temple.

Kao Yao joins with Chi San Yuen and his men to attack the temple, and since the gang is expecting them, some of Chi's men are killed by booby traps. Eventually, Kao Yao and Chi San Yuen confront the three chiefs of this brutal gang and do their best to take them out once and for all.

== Cast ==
- Philip Kwok aka Kuo Chui – Kao Yao
- Lu Feng – Lin Yung Chi
- Chiang Sheng – Chi San Yuen
- Chu Ko – Liang Yung
- Chin Siu-Ho – Chang Chung (as Hsiao Hau Chien)
- Wang Li – Fong Su Kwong
