= Lo Mang =

Hong Kong martial artist and actor

Lo Mang 羅莽
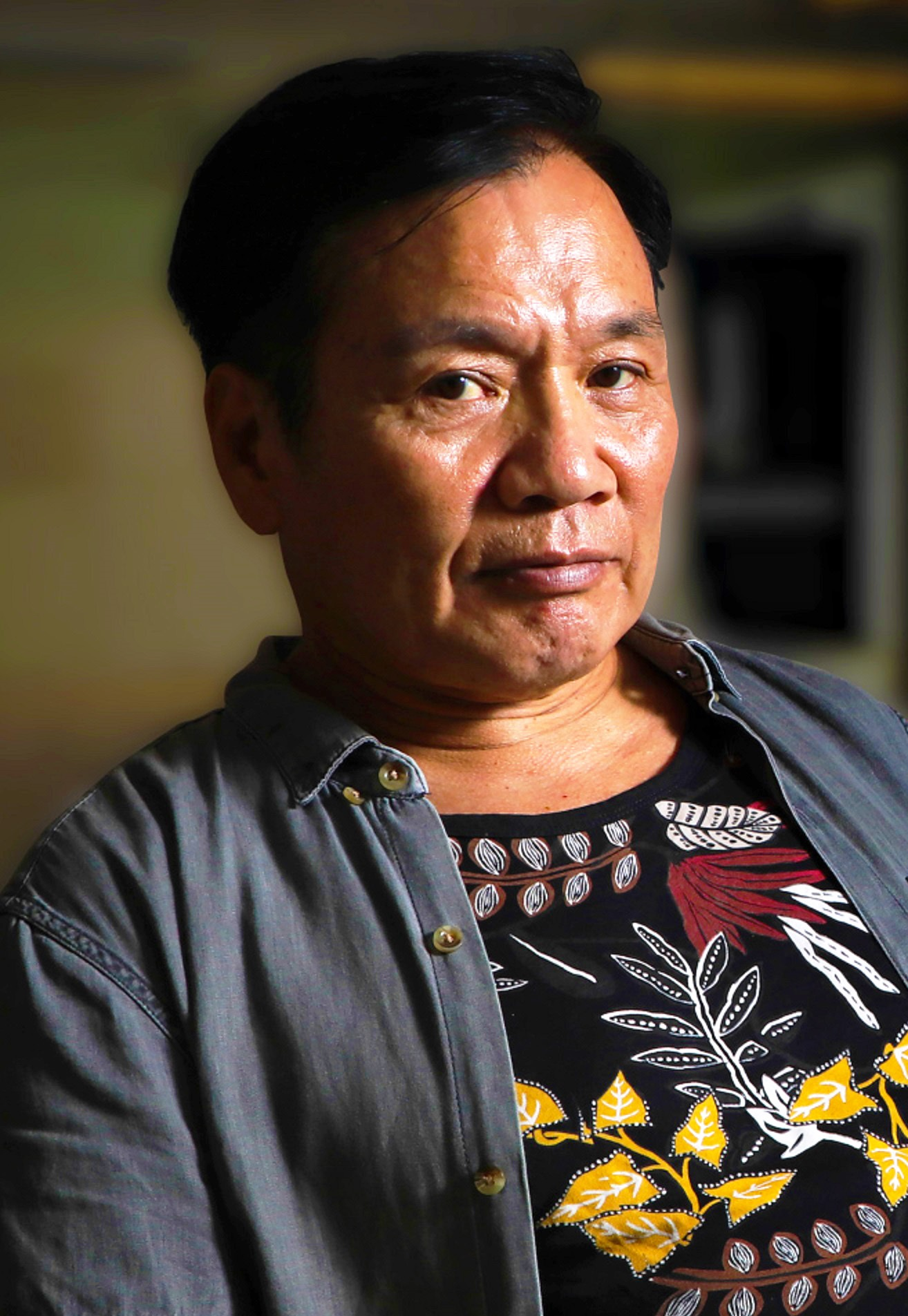
- Lo Mang in 2020
- Born: Lo Kwan Lam (羅坤霖); 23 July 1952 (age 74); British Hong Kong
- Occupations: Actor, comedian, martial artist
- Years active: 1976–present

Chinese name
- Traditional Chinese: 羅莽
- Simplified Chinese: 罗莽
Transcriptions
Standard Mandarin
- Hanyu Pinyin: Luò Máng
Yue: Cantonese
- Jyutping: lo4 mong5
- Musical career
- Also known as: Johnson Law; Turbo Law; Ramone Law; Ramon Lo; Law Mong

Lo Mang (born 23 July 1952) is a Hong Kong martial artist and actor. Primarily known for starring in Shaw Brothers kung fu movies during the latter part of the 1970s and into the 1980s. He is a member of the famous ensemble known as the Venom Mob who were renowned for their martial arts and acting skills.

His most famous roles include The Toad in The Five Deadly Venoms (1978) and the titular character in Kid with the Golden Arm (1979). He is a skilled martial artist and practiced Taijiquan for years, as well as Chow Gar Tong Long Southern Praying Mantis for over 13 years before starting an acting career. He had a well built physique despite doing no weight training. Sometimes referred to as the "Shaolin Hercules," he is renowned for playing the strongest personality in his films, but being the first one to be killed.

He is still active in the Hong Kong TV industry. Nowadays he has revamped his acting style as a comedy actor and is involved in directing action choreography for some productions.

== Filmography ==
- Shaolin Temple (1976) a.k.a. U.S. title: Death Chamber - Shaolin monk
- The Naval Commandos (1977)
- The Last Strike (1977) a.k.a. U.S. title: Soul Brothers of Kung Fu
- Chinatown Kid (1977) - Green Drangons gang leader
- The Brave Archer (1977) a.k.a. U.S. title: Kung Fu Warlords - Han Pao Chu of the Seven Weirdos of Chiang-Nan
- The Brave Archer 2 (1978) a.k.a. U.S. title: Kung Fu Warlords Part II - Iron Palm Chief
- Five Deadly Venoms (1978) - Li Hao the Toad (#5)
- Invincible Shaolin (1978) a.k.a. U.S. title: Unbeatable Dragon - Ho Ming Pao
- Kid with the Golden Arm (1979) - Golden Arm, Chief #1 of the Chih Sah Gang
- Crippled Avengers (1979) a.k.a. U.S. title: Mortal Combat; a.k.a. Dragon Dynasty region 1 DVD title: Return of the 5 Deadly Venoms - the deaf & mute blacksmith Wei
- Shaolin Rescuers (1979) a.k.a. U.S. title: Avenging Warriors of Shaolin - Chin Ah Chen
- Magnificent Ruffians (1979) a.k.a. U.S. title: The Destroyers - Kuan Yun
- The Daredevils (1979) a.k.a. U.S. title: Daredevils of Kung Fu - Yang Ta-Ying
- Life Gamble (1979) (shot in 1977) - Mo Chun-Feng
- Heaven and Hell (1980) a.k.a. U.S. title: Shaolin Hellgate (shot in 1976) - Wei Han Ting
- The Rebel Intruders (1980) a.k.a. U.S. title: Killer Army - Chi Chun-Peng
- 2 Champions of Shaolin (1980) - Tong Chien-Chin "the Shaolin Hercules"
- Ten Tigers of Kwangtung (1979) - Iron Fingers Chen Tie Fou
- The Brave Archer 3 (1981) a.k.a. U.S. title: Blast of the Iron Palm - Iron Palm Chief
- Lion Vs. Lion (1981) a.k.a. U.S. title: Roar of the Lion - Ah Yu
- Battle for the Republic of China (1981)
- Clan Feuds (1982) aka: The Great Banner - Yun Cheng
- Five Element Ninjas (1982) a.k.a. U.S. title: Super Ninjas - Liang Chi-Sheng
- Human Lanterns (1982) - Kuei Sze-Yin
- Hex After Hex (1982) - Tsang Ma Su
- 82 Tenants (1982) - Johnny Lo
- Bastard Swordsman (1983)
- Fast Fingers (1983) - Captain Tieh Li Wei
- Men from the Gutter (1983) - Sgt. Chao
- Secret Service of the Imperial Court (1984) - Chao Pu Kuan
- Crazy Shaolin Disciples (1985) a.k.a. U.S. VHS title: Enter The 36th Chamber - Hung Hsi-Kuan
- Pursuit of a Killer (1985) - Ye Hong
- This Man Is Dangerous (1985) - Chief Inspector Luo
- Naughty Boys (1986)
- Magnificent Warriors (1987) - General Toga's Henchman #2
- Hard Boiled (1992)
- Return to a Better Tomorrow (1994) - Black Ox
- Sex and Zen III (1998) as Hung Chi
- The Tricky King (1998) - King of Tricks
- The Masked Prosecutor (1999) - Kwong Cho-foon
- Fire of Conscience (2010) - Tram witness
- Ip Man 2 (2010)
- Gallants (2010) - Qilin
- Beach Spike (2011)
- The Grandmaster (2013)
- Ip Man 3 (2015)
- Buddy Cops (2016)
- Vampire Cleanup Department (2017)
- Made in Chinatown (2019)
- Ip Man 4 (2019)

=== Television series ===
- Mystery of the Twin Swords II (1992)
- The Buddhism Palm Strikes Back (1993)
- Heroes from Shaolin (1993)
- The Condor Heroes Return (1993)
- The Romance of the White Hair Maiden (1995)
- A Recipe for the Heart (1997)
- Journey to the West II (1998)
- Witness to a Prosecution (1999)
- The Heaven Sword and Dragon Saber (2000)
- Colourful Life (2001)
- Word Twisters' Adventures (2007)
- The Seventh Day (2008)
- A Journey Called Life (2008)
- D.I.E. (2008)
- Catch Me Now (2008)
- You're Hired (2009) - Employee of debt collector's company
- The Season of Fate (2010) - Shing-tin's bodyguard
- My Better Half (2010)
- In the Eye of the Beholder (2010) - Cameo ep. 10
- Fly with Me (2010)
- The Mysteries of Love (2010) - Guest star ep. 11
- Grace Under Fire (2011) - Guest star ep. 1, 21–22
- L'Escargot (2012)
- Til Love Do Us Lie (2012)
- Three Kingdoms RPG (2012)
- Divas in Distress (2012)
- Silver Spoon, Sterling Shackles (2012)
- Inbound Troubles (2013) ep. 4 and 16
- Come Home Love (2013)
- A Change of Heart (2013)
- Always and Ever (2013)
- Queen Divas (2014)
- Line Walker (2014) ep. 17, 18, 25 and 26
- Raising the Bar (2015) - Sit Kim
- Blue Veins (2016) - Chan Tai-ping

=== Music video ===
- MC $oHo & KidNey - 'Black Mirror' (2021)
- MC $oHo & KidNey - 'Black Mirror' Making of (2021)
