= Philip Kwok =

- Born: 陳舉陸 (Chan Kui-Luk); 21 October 1951 (age 74); Taipei, Taiwan
- Musical career
- Also known as: 郭振鋒 (Kwok Chun-Fung)

Philip Kwok (Chinese: 郭追; also known as Kuo Chui, Kwok Chui, Kwok Chun-Fung; born 21 October 1951) is a Hong Kong–based Taiwanese actor, martial artist, and stuntman. He rose to fame as a member of the Venom Mob, an ensemble of martial arts actors who starred in several films for Shaw Brothers Studio in the 1970s and 1980s. He played "Mad Dog", the main villain's henchman with high morals in John Woo's Hard Boiled (1992).

== Filmography ==
=== Acting ===
- Dynamite Brothers (1974) – Tuen's henchman (uncredited)
- Na Cha the Great (1974)
- Hong hai er (1975) – Blue stone statue
- Marco Polo aka The Four Assassins (1975) – Chen Chieh / Chen Jie
- Shen hu (1975)
- Hand of Death (1976)
- Zhong yuan biao ju (1976)
- the Boxer Rebellion (1976) – Kung Fu demonstrator / Japanese
- Demon Fists of Kung Fu (1976)
- Master of the Flying Guillotine (1976)
- Savage Killers (1976)
- Cai li fa xiao zi (1976)
- Shaolin Temple (1976) – Lin Kwong-yao
- 7-Man Army (1976)
- Yi qi guang gun zou tian ya (1977)
- The Naval Commandos (1977)
- Magnificent Wanderers (1977) – Wrestler
- The Brave Archer (1977) – Zhou Botong
- Chinatown Kid (1977) – White Dragon Boss
- Life Gamble (1978) – Qui Zi Yu
- The Brave Archer 2 (1978)
- Five Deadly Venoms (1978) – He Yuan-xin, Gecko / Lizard
- Invincible Shaolin (1978) – Ho Ying Wu (Fishtail Pole)
- Crippled Avengers (1978) – Chen Shuen
- The Kings of Kung Fu (1978) – Leung
- Shaolin Rescuers (1979) – Ying Cha-Po
- Shaolin Daredevils (1979) – Liang Kuo-jen
- The Magnificent Ruffians (1979) – Yang Zhui Feng
- Kid with the Golden Arm (1979) – Agent Hai Tou
- Heaven and Hell (1980) – Cheng Tien-Yang
- Flag of Iron (1980) – Iron Panther
- Rebel Intruders (1980) – Wong Shu
- Legend of the Fox (1980)
- Ten Tigers of Kwangtung (1980) – Beggar So
- Sword Stained with Royal Blood (1981) – Yuan Cheng-chih
- Masked Avengers (1981) – Kao Yao / former No. 2
- The Brave Archer 3 (1981)
- Ninja in the Deadly Trap (1981) – Mao Tin-Yeung
- House of Traps (1982) – Zhi Hua – the Black Fox
- The Brave Archer and His Mate (1982) – Kuo Tsing
- Ode to Gallantry (1982)
- The Enchantress (1983)
- Holy Flame of the Martial World (1983) – Yama Elder
- Demon of the Lute (1983)
- Crazy Shaolin Disciples (1985) – Master Kuai
- Lady in Black (1987) – Kern
- The Big Heat (1988) – Ah Kam
- Fatal Love (1988) – Pow
- Hero of Tomorrow (1988) – Big B
- Legend of the Phoenix (1988) – Jikaku (Kujaku's Father)
- Seven Warriors (1989) – Au
- In the Line of Duty 6 (1991) – Tam
- In the Line of Duty VII (1991) – Chui
- The Story of Ricky (1991) – Lin Hung
- Hard Boiled (1992) – Mad Dog
- The Cat (1992) – Wang Chieh-Mei
- Zen of Sword (1993) – God of War
- American Shaolin (1994) – Kung Ching, Cab Driver
- Shao Lin huo bao bei (1994)
- The Phantom Lover (1995)
- Tomorrow Never Dies (1997) – General Chang
- Color of Pain (2002)
- The Eye 2 (2004) – Monk, Buddhist Master

=== Stunts ===
- Treasure Hunt (1994) – action director
- From Zero to Hero (1994) – action coordinator
- The Phantom Lover (1995) – stunt coordinator
- Tomorrow Never Dies (1997) – stunt arranger
- The Sunshine Cops (1999) – action choreographer
- Double Tap (2000) – martial arts choreographer
- Lavender (2000) – stunt coordinator
- Comic King (2001) – stunt coordinator
- Brotherhood of the Wolf (2001) – fight choreographer
- Samourais (2002) – fight choreographer
- The Touch (2002) – stunt coordinator
- Yellow Dragon (2003) – action director
- Son of the Dragon (2006) – action director
- Blood Brothers (2007) – action choreography
- Ballistic (2008) – action choreographer
- Princess and the Seven Kung Fu Masters (2013) – stunt coordinator
- That Demon Within (2014) – stunt choreographer

== See also ==
- Venom Mob
