= Cantonen Iron Kung Fu =

1979 Hong Kong film by Lee Chiu

- Film poster
- Traditional Chinese: 廣東鐵橋三
- Simplified Chinese: 广东铁桥三
- Hanyu Pinyin: Guǎng Dōng Tiě Qiáo Sān
- Jyutping: Gwong2 Dung1 Tit3 Kiu4 Saam1
- Directed by: Lee Chiu
- Screenplay by: Wai San; Lee Chiu
- Produced by: Yuen Kam-lum; Lau Chun-fei
- Starring: Bryan Leung; Philip Ko; Wong Chung
- Cinematography: Lai Man-sing; Cheng Kap-tung
- Production company: Chiu Lik Films
- Distributed by: Goldig Films (HK)
- Release date: 14 September 1979
- Running time: 88 minutes
- Country: Hong Kong
- Language: Cantonese
- Box office: HK$1,020,687

Cantonen Iron Kung Fu is a 1979 Hong Kong martial arts film written and directed by Lee Chiu and starring Bryan Leung as historical figure Leung Kwan, who was one of the Ten Tigers of Canton. Aside from starring in the lead role, Leung also worked on planning of the film.

== Plot ==
Leung Kwan (Bryan Leung) is a coolie who gets to a fight with worker Yu (Lee Chiu) over a misunderstanding. While their misunderstanding was resolved, they become friends. Meanwhile, a corrupt businessman Black Eagle (Philip Ko) is planning to take over the supply routes. Yu stands up to him and challenges to fight several of his henchmen where he is killed as a result. After seeing this, Leung vows to seek revenge despite his lackluster martial arts skills. Leung then meets Master Lin Tao-hoi (Wong Hap), a merchant and martial arts instructor who becomes Leung's boss and mentor. Black Eagle then kills Lin and Leung's friends. Later, Chen Sun (Wong Chung) a fighter who have been tracking Black Eagle from Northern China for six years, poses as a coolie where he meets Leung, and together, they join forces to take down Black Eagle.

== Cast ==
- Bryan Leung as Leung Kwan / Iron Bridge Three / 3rd Brother
- Philip Ko as Black Eagle
- Wong Chung as Chen Sun
- Ting Wa-chung as Thief
- Wong Hap as Lin Tao-hoi
- Lee Teng-tsai
- Tsang Chiu-yee
- Lee Chiu as Yu
- Ma Chin-ku
- Pang San
- Ching Kuo-chung
- Lau Chun-fai
- Pui Tak-wan
- Law Kei
- Yuen Kam-lun
- Fang Ying
- Hsiao Tu
- Huang Chung
- Au Lap-po as Food seller
- Woo Hon-cheung

== Reception ==
=== Critical ===
Mark Polland of Kung Fu Cinema rated the film three out of five stars and gave the film a mixed review noting its uneven pacing but praising Bryan Leung's performance.

=== Box office ===
The film grossed HK$1,020,687 at the Hong Kong box office during its theatrical run from 19 to 27 September 1979 in Hong Kong.
