= Legend of the Dragon =

Legend of the Dragon may refer to:

- Legend of the Dragon (film), a 1990 Hong Kong film starring Stephen Chow
- Legend of the Dragon (2005 film), a 2005 film starring Sammo Hung
- Legend of the Dragon (TV series), a children's animated television program
  - Legend of the Dragon (video game), a 2007 video game based on the above show

== See also ==
- The Legend of Dragoon
