= Wu-Tang Forever (disambiguation) =

Wu-Tang Forever is a 1997 album by the Wu-Tang Clan.

Wu-Tang Forever may also refer to:

- "Wu-Tang Forever" (Drake song), 2013 song by Drake
- "Wu Tang Forever" (Logic song), 2018 song by Logic
