= Jyu Jik Chuyhn =

Jyu Jik Chuyhn 朱亦傳 (1892–1980) was born in the Toi-San district of Guangdong province and began his training in martial arts at an early age. Originally learning Hung Kuyhn and later Choy Lay Fut from a monk named Choy Ying. Choy Ying introduced Jyu Jik Chuyhn to Jaang Saan Ying, head Monk of the Clear Cloud Temple in Toi San.

Jyu studied a wide variety of martial arts under the tutelage of Jaang Saan Ying. Along with Choy Lay Fut, he was trained in other arts such as Southern Eagle Claw (Nam Ying Jao Kuyhnn, also known as “Ngok Fei Pai” after the founder General Ngok Fei, Mandarin Yue Fei). His training in these styles prepared him for what he would learn under both Wong Lam-hoi and Wong Yan-lam.

Jyu first learned Lama Pai under the direction of Wong Lam-hoi. Such an accomplished martial artist was Jyu that he learned all of Wong Lam-hoi’s Lama Pai hand and weapon sets in under 7 years. Wong Lam-hoi founded the Lama Pai lineage later called Bak Hok Pai, or Tibetan White Crane. Towards the end of his training Jyu sought out the teachings of Wong Yan-lam upon his return to Guangdong. Wong Yan-lam was one of the Ten Tigers of Canton, and his Lama Pai lineage was later called Hop Ga Kuen or Martial Hero Family Fist. Jyu spent many years learning different forms from Wong Yan-lam until he completed the Lama Pai style. Jyu Chuyhn was the only man who learned with both teachers and was accepted by both as a disciple. He learned the entire system and was given permission by both Wong Yan-lam and Wong Lam-hoi to pass on the Lama Pai system.

Notable students under Jyu were:

1. Gong Kwan-San
2. Lei Lun-San
3. Leu Yuk-San
4. Lei Sek-San
5. Lei Chiu-San
6. Jyu Wu-San
7. Jyu Wan-San
8. Lei Git-San
9. Jyu Ching San
10. Lei Wai-San
11. Chan Tai-San

Jyu is survived by his 4th son, Jyu Maan Yueng (1939) who is a doctor living in Toi San, China. He is proficient in the Choy Lay Fut style of his father and still teaches at 70 years of age.
