= Wu Tang Forever (Logic song) =

Song by American rapper Logic

Song by Logic featuring Ghostface Killah, Raekwon, RZA, Method Man, Inspectah Deck, Cappadonna, Jackpot Scotty Wotty, U-God, Masta Killa and GZA

from the album YSIV
- Released: September 28, 2018
- Recorded: 2018
- Genre: Hardcore hip-hop; East Coast hip-hop
- Length: 8:07
- Label: Visionary; Def Jam
- Songwriters: Various: Sir Robert Hall II; Arjun Ivatury; Russell Jones; Jason Hunter; Robert Diggs; Corey Woods; Dennis Coles; Darryl Hill; Caleb Armstrong; Brian Alexander Morgan; Elgin Turner; Lamont Hawkins; Ray Anthony Smith; Scott Watt; Joshua Portillo; Gary Grice; Clifford Smith
- Producers: 6ix; NAZ.

"Wu Tang Forever" is a song by American rapper Logic, featured as the sixth track on his 2018 album YSIV. The song is a homage to the hip-hop group Wu-Tang Clan and features all living members of the group: Ghostface Killah, Raekwon, RZA, Method Man, Inspectah Deck, Cappadonna, U-God, Masta Killa and GZA, as well as Wu-Tang Clan affiliate Jackpot Scotty Wotty; deceased member Ol' Dirty Bastard received a writing credit. The song shares the same title as the group's second studio album.

== Background and inspiration ==
Logic has been a long-time Wu-Tang Clan fan and over the years, has gained the respect of the Wu-Tang rappers; he has stated that the group was his "introduction to hip-hop". In fact, the rapper's first live performance was opening for Wu-Tang member Ghostface Killah. In an interview, Logic said that he, while intoxicated, contacted Wu-Tang member RZA and asked if he could get every Wu-Tang member on his album and call it "Wu Tang Forever". RZA was enthusiastic to the idea, saying "all you gotta do is ask, baby" and made it happen. On October 1, 2018, Logic posted a video on Instagram, showing him rapping the lyrics to the song. The video was captioned "Recorded Wu Tang Forever while I was on tour this summer".

== Composition ==
The song is eight minutes and seven seconds in length; it song consists of an intro, 11 verses, and an outro. The first verse is provided by Logic, followed by Ghostface Killah, Raekwon, RZA, Method Man, Inspectah Deck, Cappadonna, Jackpot Scotty Wotty, U-God, Masta Killa, and GZA.

== Commercial performance ==
The song reached number 44 on the Billboard Digital Songs chart and number 17 on the Billboard Hot R&B/Hip-Hop Songs chart the week of October 13, 2018. The song marked Wu-Tang Clan's first Billboard charting single since 2002, with their single "Uzi (Pinky Ring)" from their album Iron Flag.

== Reception ==
The song has received positive reviews from music critics. Yoh Phillips of DJBooth praised the song, complimenting everyone who appears, although criticizing the song's length. Alphonse Pierre of Pitchfork gave the song a positive review, writing "Logic is all in, dedicating himself to fitting in as the latest Wu-affiliate, which rubs off on the Wu who, for once, don’t take that cushiony Def Jam direct deposit for granted." Conversely, Christopher R. Weingarten of Rolling Stone believed the song is a great example of showcasing Logic's strengths and weaknesses, writing that the rapper had none of the Clan's "mystery, their way with funk and flow, [or] the effortlessness of their punchlines."

== Samples ==
The song contains dialogue from the martial arts films Ten Tigers from Kwangtung (1979) and Shaolin and Wu Tang (1983); the same dialogue is used in Wu-Tang Clan's song "Bring da Ruckus" from their debut album Enter the Wu-Tang (36 Chambers).

== Personnel ==
Credits adapted from Tidal.

- Main artist – Logic
- Featured artists – Ghostface Killah, Raekwon, RZA, Method Man, Inspectah Deck, Cappadonna, Jackpot Scotty Wotty, U-God, Masta Killa and GZA
- Producers – 6ix, NAZ.
- Composers and lyricists – Sir Robert Hall II, Arjun Ivatury, Russell Jones, Jason Hunter, Robert Diggs, Corey Woods, Dennis Coles, Darryl Hill, Caleb Armstrong, Brian Alexander Morgan, Elgin Turner, Lamont Hawkins, Ray Anthony Smith, Scott Watt, Joshua Portillo, Gary Grice, Clifford Smith
- Mixer and recording engineer – Robert Campbell
- Recording Engineer (for Inspectah Deck and Masta Killa) - Josh Gannet
- Assistant mixers – Matt Dyson, Tyler Gorgon, Karl Wingate, Gabe Burch
- Studio personnel – Matt Dyson, Tyler Gorgon, Karl Wingate, Gabe Burch, Robert Campbell

== Charts ==
Chart (2018)	Peak position
New Zealand Hot Singles (RMNZ)	14
US Digital Song Sales (Billboard)	44
US Hot R&B/Hip-Hop Songs (Billboard)	17
