= YSIV =

Studio album by Logic
- Released: September 28, 2018
- Recorded: 2017–2018
- Genre: Hip-hop
- Length: 76:03
- Label: Visionary; Def Jam
- Producer: 6ix (also exec.); Cubeatz; Logic; Izaiah; Kajo; Matthew Crabtree; NAZ.; Rascal; Ryan Tedder; Sunny Norway; Vontae Thomas

Logic chronology
Bobby Tarantino II (2018)	YSIV (2018)	Supermarket (2019)

Singles from YSIV
- 1. "One Day" Released: July 27, 2018; 2. "The Return" Released: August 24, 2018; 3. "Everybody Dies" Released: September 7, 2018

YSIV (abbreviation of Young Sinatra IV) is the fourth studio album by American rapper Logic, released on September 28, 2018, by Visionary Music Group and Def Jam Recordings. The album art, featuring a mugshot of Logic himself, is stylized similarly to the famous mugshot of Frank Sinatra and reminiscent of the artwork for Logic's second mixtape Young Sinatra, released in 2011. The album serves as a sequel to the mixtape Young Sinatra: Welcome to Forever, released in 2013, and is the fourth and final installment of the Young Sinatra series. The album is notable for being credited as an album in the Young Sinatra series, as the previous titles were released as mixtapes. It features guest appearances from all living members of Wu-Tang Clan, Wale, Jaden, Ryan Tedder and Hailee Steinfeld, among others.

== Background ==
In July, August and September 2018, Logic released three singles "One Day" featuring Ryan Tedder, "The Return", and "Everybody Dies".

The album features the song "Wu Tang Forever" which features all the surviving members of the Wu Tang Clan including Method Man, Raekwon, Inspectah Deck, U-God, Masta Killa, Cappadonna, RZA, GZA, Ghostface Killah. The song "YSIV" has Logic paying tribute to rapper Mac Miller, who died earlier in the month via accidental drug overdose.

== Release and promotion ==
YSIV was released on September 28, 2018. For the first single "One Day", Logic released a music video for the song. The music video caused controversy, as it sympathized with the plight of undocumented migrants in the United States. He later performed the song at the 2018 VMA Awards with collaborator Ryan Tedder, where he brought hundreds of migrant children onto the stage. Logic himself wore a shirt which read, "F**k The Wall", and the kids wore shirts reading, "We Are All Human Beings". On August 28, Logic released a video titled "YSIV Freestyle" and a social media post, finally announcing Young Sinatra IV along with its album cover. A few weeks prior to release of the album, Logic hosted an exclusive listening party with his fans, uploading a short movie about it to YouTube.

The album was released in the same week as another high-profile hip-hop album, Tha Carter V by Lil Wayne.

== Critical reception ==
Professional ratings
Aggregate scores
Source	Rating
Metacritic	71/100
Review scores
Source	Rating
AllMusic	3.5/5 stars
Exclaim!	8/10
Highsnobiety	4/5 stars
HipHopDX	4/5
Pitchfork	5.5/10
Rolling Stone	3/5 stars
XXL	4/5

YSIV received positive reviews from music critics. At Metacritic, which assigns a normalized rating out of 100 to reviews from mainstream publications, the album received an average score of 71, based on 7 reviews. Riley Wallace from HipHopDX gave a positive review saying, "Overall, Bobby has bars for days — and days — and as a consistent top to bottom play, YSIV has vibrant energy. If you can listen to this LP the whole way through and doubt his pen game, then the question becomes: "what does he have to do to please you?" If getting the entire Wu-Tang Clan on a song doesn't impress you, nothing will." Charles Holmes from XXL said, "YSIV succeeds when it forgoes pretentious views on what hip-hop should be and instead focuses on what makes the self-proclaimed Young Sinatra unique. The trio of "Everybody Dies", "The Return", and "The Glorious Five" feature the Everybody MC at his most fluid and nimble." Riley Wallace wrote another review for Exclaim! where he said, "This is Logic at his best: making music that makes him happy. His comfort zone is infectious. If YSIV doesn't sell you on Logic, nothing will." Jon Caramanica from The New York Times said, "YSIV — the conclusion of his Young Sinatra series of mixtapes — is his most confident and accomplished release to date, shaking off some of the awkwardness that has long peppered his music." Trey Alston from Highsnobiety praised the project, saying that "YSIV is gaudy, confident, and cocksure; Logic talks his shit without filter, crafting mesmerizing narratives, witty punchlines, and out-of-his-comfort-zone experiments – often on the same track. It amounts to an absorbing final installment of a series that already functions as an inordinate quantum of comfort food. We're finally stuffed." Andy Kellman from AllMusic said, "What comes through most is Logic's self-acknowledged eminence, an abundance of lyrical and sonic references to what he calls "real rap," and an insatiable eagerness"

Some critics gave the album mixed feedback. Alphonse Pierre from Pitchfork said, "Over some dusty boom-bap, the undoubtedly talented Logic spends just way too much time trying to forcibly cement his place in hip-hop history." Christopher R. Weingarten from Rolling Stone said, "The chart-topping rapper positions himself as a scrappy underdog with go-getter ambition and complex bars. Logic rhymes in exciting ways, but the meanings can be a little strained."

== Commercial performance ==
YSIV debuted at number two on the US Billboard 200 with 167,000 album-equivalent units, including 122,000 album sales in its first week. It is Logic's fifth US top 10 album, and second in 2018.

== Track listing ==
Credits adapted from Tidal.

No.	Title	Writer(s)	Producer(s)	Length
1.	"Thank You" (featuring Lucy Rose and the RattPack)	Sir Robert Hall II; Corinne Bailey Rae; Paris Strother; Darrel Alston; Lucy Rose Parton; Tobias Breuer; Amber Strother	Vontae Thomas; Rascal	7:10
2.	"Everybody Dies"	Hall; Arjun Ivatury; Khalil Abdul-Rahman; Tim Gomringer; Kevin Gomringer	6ix; Cubeatz	4:10
3.	"The Return"	Hall; Ivatury; Dimitri Tiomkin; Ned Washington	6ix	4:12
4.	"The Glorious Five"	Hall; Ivatury; Matthew Crabtree	6ix; Crabtree	3:36
5.	"One Day" (featuring Ryan Tedder)	Hall; Ivatury; Tedder; Kevin Randolph; Zach Skelton	6ix; Tedder	3:18
6.	"Wu Tang Forever" (featuring Ghostface Killah, Raekwon, RZA, Method Man, Inspectah Deck, Cappadonna, Jackpot Scotty Wotty, U-God, Masta Killa and GZA)	Hall; Ivatury; Joshua Portillo; Dennis Coles; Corey Woods; Robert Diggs; Clifford Smith; Jason Hunter; Darryl Hill; Samuel Regis; Lamont Hawkins; Elgin Turner; Gary Grice; Russell Jones; Caleb Armstrong; Brian Alexander Morgan; Ray Anthony Smith	6ix; Naz.	8:07
7.	"100 Miles and Running" (featuring Wale and John Lindahl)	Hall; Jeremiah Lordan; John Dombek Lindahl; Olubowale Akintimehin	6ix; Logic	5:53
8.	"Ordinary Day" (featuring Hailee Steinfeld)	Hall; Ivatury; Hailee Steinfeld; Nick Lubbersen	6ix	3:08
9.	"YSIV"	Hall; Ivatury; Nasir Jones; Olu Dara; Melvin Dinkins; Oliver A. Scott; Anthony S. Cruz; Kier Gist; Thomas Wlodaryck; Ronnie James Wilson	6ix	6:09
10.	"Street Dreams II"	Hall; Ivatury	6ix	4:26
11.	"The Adventures of Stoney Bob" (featuring Kajo, Slaydro and Big Lenbo)	Hall; Ivatury; Barrington Levy; Arkae Tuazon; Frank Umana-Soto; Leon Ressalam	6ix; Kajo	4:20
12.	"Legacy"	Hall; Portillo; Jamahal Osley	Naz.; Sunny Norway	5:51
13.	"Iconic" (featuring Jaden Smith)	Hall; Ivatury; Melvin Lewis	Naz.; Sunny Norway	4:58
14.	"Last Call"	Hall II; Ivatury; Isaiah Elwell	6ix; Izaiah	10:45
Total length:				76:03

Notes

- "Thank You" contains a sample of "Green Aphrodisiac", performed by Corinne Bailey Rae.
- "Everybody Dies" contains an interpolation of "Barry Bonds", performed by Kanye West.
- "The Return" contains a sample of "Crack Music", performed by Kanye West, and "Wild Is the Wind", performed by Nina Simone.
- "Wu Tang Forever" contains dialogue from the martial arts films Ten Tigers from Kwangtung (1979) and Shaolin and Wu Tang (1983); the same dialogue is used in Wu-Tang Clan's song "Bring da Ruckus" from their debut album Enter the Wu-Tang (36 Chambers); and interpolations of "Rebirth of Slick (Cool Like Dat)", performed by Digable Planets.
- "100 Miles and Running" contains a sample of "Apache", performed by The Incredible Bongo Band, and interpolations of "Work", performed by A$AP Ferg.
- "YSIV" contains an interpolation of "Life's a Bitch", performed by Nas.
- "Iconic" contains an interpolation of "Icon", performed by Jaden Smith.

== Charts ==
=== Weekly charts ===
Chart (2018)	Peak position
Australian Albums (ARIA)	8
Belgian Albums (Ultratop Flanders)	38
Canadian Albums (Billboard)	4
Danish Albums (Hitlisten)	37
Dutch Albums (Album Top 100)	17
Finnish Albums (Suomen virallinen lista)	34
Irish Albums (IRMA)	19
New Zealand Albums (RMNZ)	13
Norwegian Albums (VG-lista)	12
Scottish Albums (OCC)	54
Swedish Albums (Sverigetopplistan)	24
Swiss Albums (Schweizer Hitparade)	64
UK Albums (OCC)	19
US Billboard 200	2
US Top R&B/Hip-Hop Albums (Billboard)	2

=== Year-end charts ===
Chart (2018)	Position
US Billboard 200	177
US Top R&B/Hip-Hop Albums (Billboard)	65
