= Bryan Leung =

Hong Kong actor

- Born: 20 January 1948 (age 78); Hong Kong
- Other name: Liang Chia Jen
- Occupations: Actor; action director; film director; film producer; screenwriter
- Years active: 1969–present
- Children: Leung Ho-yee

Chinese name
Transcriptions
Standard Mandarin
- Hanyu Pinyin: Liáng Jiārēn
Yue: Cantonese
- Jyutping: Leong4 Gaa1 Jan4

Bryan Leung Kar-yan (Chinese: 梁家仁, born 20 January 1948) is a Hong Kong film and television actor and film director who has played roles in numerous acclaimed martial arts films. He is affectionately known as "Beardy" due to his trademark facial hair. He also has characteristic hyper-extendable fingers, which can be observed when he has his palms open and his fingers outstretched. Despite being one of the most well-known faces in Hong Kong action cinema, he had no formal martial arts training, relying on his talents at mimicry to imitate the moves shown to him by the action directors. He had Taiwan nationality starting from 1985,& became Taiwanese. His nephew is the actor Oscar Leung.

== Career ==
Leung's action film career began in 1969. His good looks and natural athleticism took him to Shaw Brothers, where he appeared in several renowned period kung fu films, although he was rarely offered leading roles. His big-break came under the direction of Sammo Hung, with whom he fought in Enter the Fat Dragon (1978), and co-starred in the seminal Warriors Two (1978). His performance in Warriors Two, as Mr. Tsan, a real-life historical doctor and master of Wing Chun, is described as "the best performance of his career" by Mark Pollard of Kung Fu Cinema, who goes on to write:

Leung Kar-yan is brilliant in his role as the teacher. He adds just the right amount of austerity and presence without overdoing it. It is also obvious why he was chosen for this role over an older actor. To the layman, he really looks like a Wing Chun expert and his physical grace is undeniable.

Leung continued to work with Sammo Hung, achieving further success with a string of highly rated kung-fu comedies, including Knockabout (1979), where he and Yuen Biao played crooks being harassed by a kung-fu beggar played by Hung.

In Dreadnaught (1981), he played Wong Fei-hung's student (without his trademark beard). The film again featured Yuen Biao, as well as veteran kung-fu star Kwan Tak-hing playing Wong Fei-hung. It also marked Leung's first collaboration with director Yuen Woo-ping, and he would go on to star in several acclaimed Yuen Woo-ping directed films, including Legend of a Fighter (1982), in which he portrayed historical figure Fok Yuen-gap, and The Miracle Fighters (1982).

During this same period, Leung also enjoyed some success in television acting, appearing as Kiu Fung in TVB's 1982 adaptation of Louis Cha's Wuxia novel Demi-Gods and Semi-Devils and as Kwok Ching in the 1983 adaptation of The Return of the Condor Heroes.

Despite this acting success, Leung's 1984 directorial debut, Profile in Anger, was relatively unsuccessful. This marked a lowering of his star profile, as he began to take more supporting roles and less leading roles. He continues to act and direct into the 2000s, occasionally appearing in high-profile films like Last Hero in China (1993), where he co-starred with Jet Li and reprised the role he had played in 1981's Dreadnaught, and several Stephen Chow vehicles including Legend of the Dragon (1990).

In 2009, Leung is to direct once again in a new martial arts action film tentatively titled Blood Relations. He will also star in the film alongside his son Leung Ho-yee and martial arts film actor Gordon Liu.

== Filmography ==
=== Film ===
| Year | Title | Role |
|---|---|---|
| 1969 | Return of the One-Armed Swordsman | |
| 1974 | Shaolin Martial Arts | Pa Kang |
| 1974 | Five Shaolin Masters | Chien San |
| 1975 | Marco Polo | Tai Dadlu / Caldalu |
| 1975 | Boxer Rebellion | |
| 1976 | Shaolin Avengers | |
| 1977 | Iron Monkey | Captain Yi |
| 1977 | Eagle's Claw | |
| 1978 | Enter the Fat Dragon | Bearded fighter |
| 1978 | Warriors Two | Mr. Tsan |
| 1978 | My Life's on the Line | Chow Sau-tung |
| 1978 | Ways of Kung Fu | Shang king |
| 1979 | Sleeping Fist | Kam Tai-fat |
| 1979 | The Thundering Mantis | Chi |
| 1979 | Knockabout | Dai Pao / Big John |
| 1979 | Odd Couple | Laughing Bandit |
| 1979 | His Name Is Nobody | Koo the Iron Heart |
| 1979 | Cantonen Iron Kung Fu | Leung Kwan |
| 1979 | Ten Brothers of Shaolin | Commander Tsao |
| 1979 | Demon Strike | Master Kiu |
| 1980 | The Victim | Leung Chung-yau |
| 1980 | Two on the Road | Lively Dragon |
| 1981 | Dreadnaught | Leung Foon |
| 1981 | Eagle's Claw and Butterfly Palm | |
| 1982 | Legend of a Fighter | Fok Yuen-gap |
| 1982 | The Postman Strikes Back | Courier Ma |
| 1982 | The Miracle Fighters | Kei Moon / Old Man |
| 1984 | Secret Service of the Imperial Court | Zhao Bufa |
| 1984 | New Tales of the Flying Fox | Wu Yat-do |
| 1984 | Profile in Anger | Leung Chun-yue |
| 1984 | Shanghai 13 | Tao Daye |
| 1985 | Danger Has Two Faces | Kam Chi-kin |
| 1985 | Hong Kong Godfather | Mad Wai |
| 1988 | Tiger Cage | Brother Lung |
| 1990 | Legend of the Dragon | Yan |
| 1991 | The Tigers | Lam Hoi-tim |
| 1992 | The Shootout | Inspector Ma |
| 1992 | Shogun and Little Kitchen | Mr. Tong Ching |
| 1993 | Last Hero in China | Leung Foon |
| 1993 | Fight Back to School III | Officer Lai |
| 1993 | Flirting Scholar | Mo Chong-yuen |
| 1994 | Kung Fu Cult Master | Lu Zhangke |
| 1994 | The Kung Fu Scholar | Lee Tai-chun / Lee Man-lung |
| 1995 | Don't Give a Damn | No-nonsense cop |
| 1995 | Out of the Dark | Mr. Wu |
| 2000 | Conman in Tokyo | Turkey |
| 2008 | Kung Fu Dunk | Master Fei |
| 2010 | True Legend | Su Wankun |
| 2010 | Legend of the Swordsman | |
| 2010 | Just Call Me Nobody | Wu Di's father / General Lee |
| 2010 | Kung Fu Master | |
| 2011 | Empire of Assassins | Emperor Wang Shi Chong |
| 2011 | Hong Kong Ghost Story | |
| 2011 | BMW Rhapsody | |
| 2012 | The Man with the Iron Fists | Hyena Chief |
| 2012 | Promise Time | |
| 2013 | Saving General Yang | Pan Ren-mei |
| 2013 | Lucky Dog | |
| 2013 | 7 Assassins | Chan |
| 2013 | Badges of Fury | Uncle Lucky |
| 2013 | Game of Assassins | |
| 2013 | Kung Fu Family | |
| 2014 | Ameera | |
| 2014 | The Scroll of Wing Chun White Crane | |
| 2015 | Bloody Destiny | |
| 2015 | Ip Man 3 | Tin Ngo-san |
| 2019 | Legend of the Demon Seal | |
| 2019 | Bright Mountain at Night | |
| 2019 | Table Tenets | |
| 2019 | The Big Explosion | |
| 2019 | Southern Mao Northern Ma | |
| 2019 | Jade Dynasty 诛仙 | Zeng Shuqiang |

=== Television ===
| Year | Title | Role | Notes |
|---|---|---|---|
| 1982 | Demi-Gods and Semi-Devils | Kiu Fung | TVB production |
| 1983 | The Return of the Condor Heroes | Kwok Ching | TVB production |
| 1984 | State of Divinity | | TTV production |
| 1986 | Fate of Two Heroes | | CTS production |
| 1987 | Return the Pearl to Thee | Ma Jun | TTV production |
| 1989 | War of the Dragon | Lee Kwan | TVB production |
| 1990 | Twin Flying Doves | | TTV Production |
| 1992 | Revelation of the Last Hero | Hak-lin Mung-seun | TVB production |
| 1996 | Wong Fei Hung Series | | |
| 1998 | Legend of Sky and Earth | | TTV production |
| 1998 | The Return of the Condor Heroes | Hong Qigong | |
| 2002 | Book and Sword, Gratitude and Revenge | Yuan Shixiao | |
| 2002 | The Monkey King: Quest for the Sutra | Lee Ching | |
| 2004 | The Dragon Heroes | Wang Jili | |
| 2005 | Real Kung Fu | Leung Yee-tai | TVB production |
| 2005 | Seven Swordsmen | Liu Jingyi | |
| 2005 | La Femme Desperado | Ko Wing-tim | TVB production |
| 2007 | The Ultimate Crime Fighter | Wong Po | TVB production |
| 2008 | Huo Yuanjia | Huo Endi | |
| 2008 | Legend of the Fist: Chen Zhen | Huangfu Yizhen | |
| 2008 | The Legend of the Condor Heroes | Hong Qigong | |
| 2008 | D.I.E. | Yue Tai-hoi | TVB production |
| 2009 | The Book and the Sword | Yuan Shixiao | |
| 2013 | The Demi-Gods and Semi-Devils | Xiao Yuanshan | |
| 2013 | Swordsman | Feng Qingyang | |
| 2013 | Ip Man | Master Hong | |
