= Cantonese folktales =

Cantonese folktales are folktales associated with the Cantonese people, the dominant subgroup in the Southern Chinese twin provinces of Guangdong and Guangxi. This body of folktales have been influenced both by the culture of Han Chinese and that of Nanyue, the original Baiyue inhabitants of the region before sinicization occurred.

== Stories ==
The more well-known stories in Cantonese folktales include:

- The Legend of Five Goats
- Ah Xiang and His Pet Snake
- Cuckoo
- The Legend of Wangfu Rock
- The Bamboo Grove of the Loyal Dog
- The Porcelain Lion
- In a Bowl of Rice
- Bao Gu and Cui Wei
- The Owl Seeks a Wife

== Figures ==
=== Lady Sin ===
Lady Sin (Jyutping: Sin^{2} fu^{1} jan^{4}; Traditional Chinese: 冼夫人), or "Madame Sin", is a well-known historical figure among Cantonese and an important figure in Cantonese folklore. Widely hailed as "the holy mother of Lingnan", she was a skilled military leader among 6th century Baiyue peoples. She helped the Sui Empire contain the mutiny of various Baiyue tribes and start the sinicization of the region, indirectly helping Lingnan evolve into her current form. There are many temples dedicated to her in the Lingnan region, resulting in her becoming a deity-like figure.

=== Yun Sung-wun ===
Yun Sung-wun (Jyutping: Jyun^{4} sung^{4} wun^{6}; Traditional Chinese: 袁崇煥) is another prominent Cantonese historic figure. Born in late 16th century, he was a general to the Ming Empire, known for participating in campaigns against the then invading Manchu people and several military engineering programs. He was later falsely accused of treason under the Chongzhen Emperor and executed. However, he still remained a heroic figure to many Cantonese. Nowadays, Cantonese have built many monuments for Yun across Lingnan, and his catchphrase "掉哪媽，頂硬上！" (Jyutping: Diu^{6} naa^{5} maa^{1} ding^{2} ngaang^{6} soeng^{5}; literally "fuck his mom, hit it hard!"; Note: this is Cantonese profanity), which he said whenever he was facing an enemy force, is common knowledge among Cantonese people. The Chinese government's removal of this phrase from one of his monuments even sparked a massive protest by Cantonese.

=== Others ===
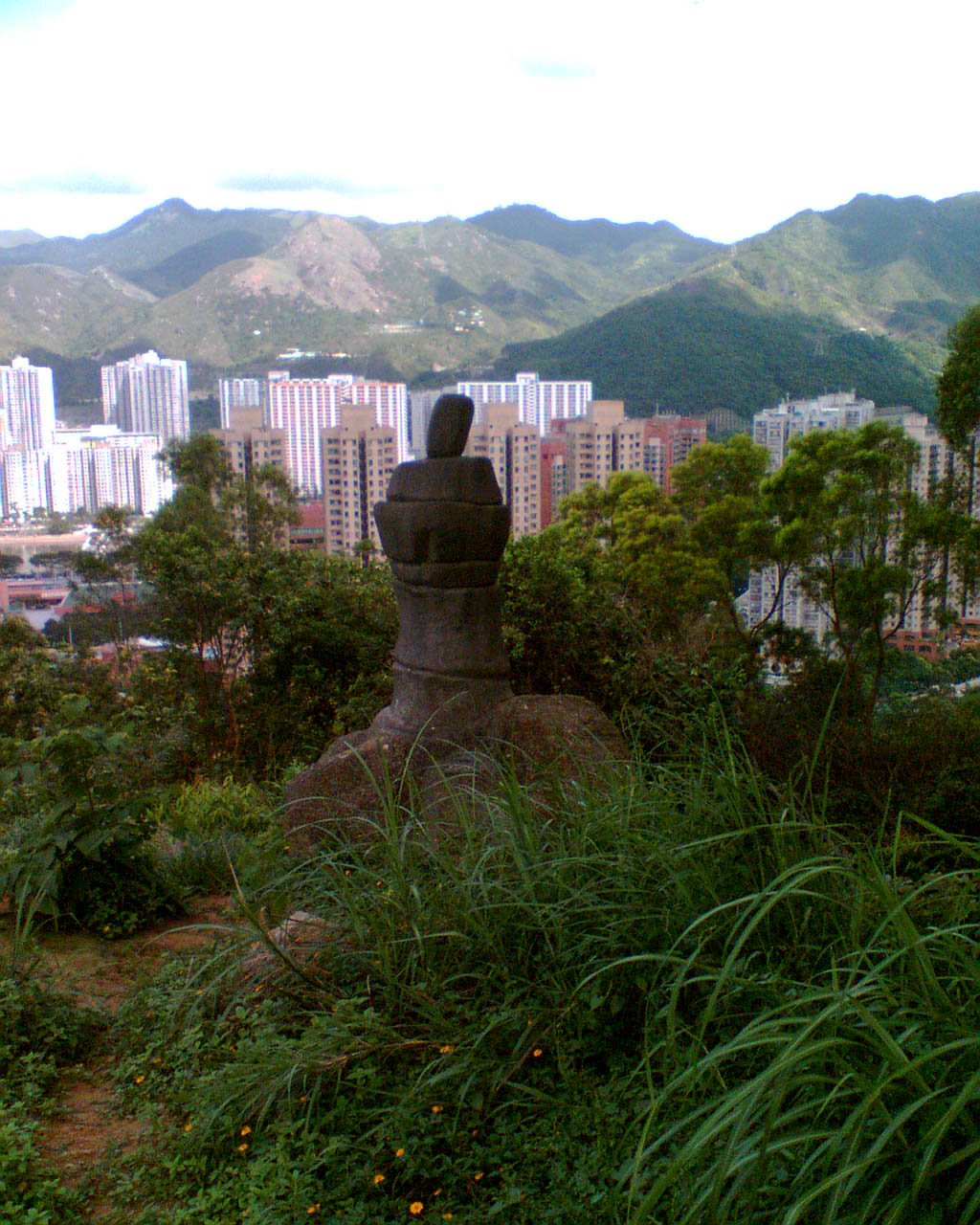
The replica of Amah Rock at Tao Fung Shan; According to Cantonese legends, a woman turned into a stone statue by standing at the seaside waiting for her husband to return home.

- Ten Tigers of Canton
- Wong Fei-hung
- Amah Rock

== See also ==
- Cantonese culture
- Cantonese people
- Chinese folklore
