= The Legend of Five Goats =

Legend of Guangzhou, China

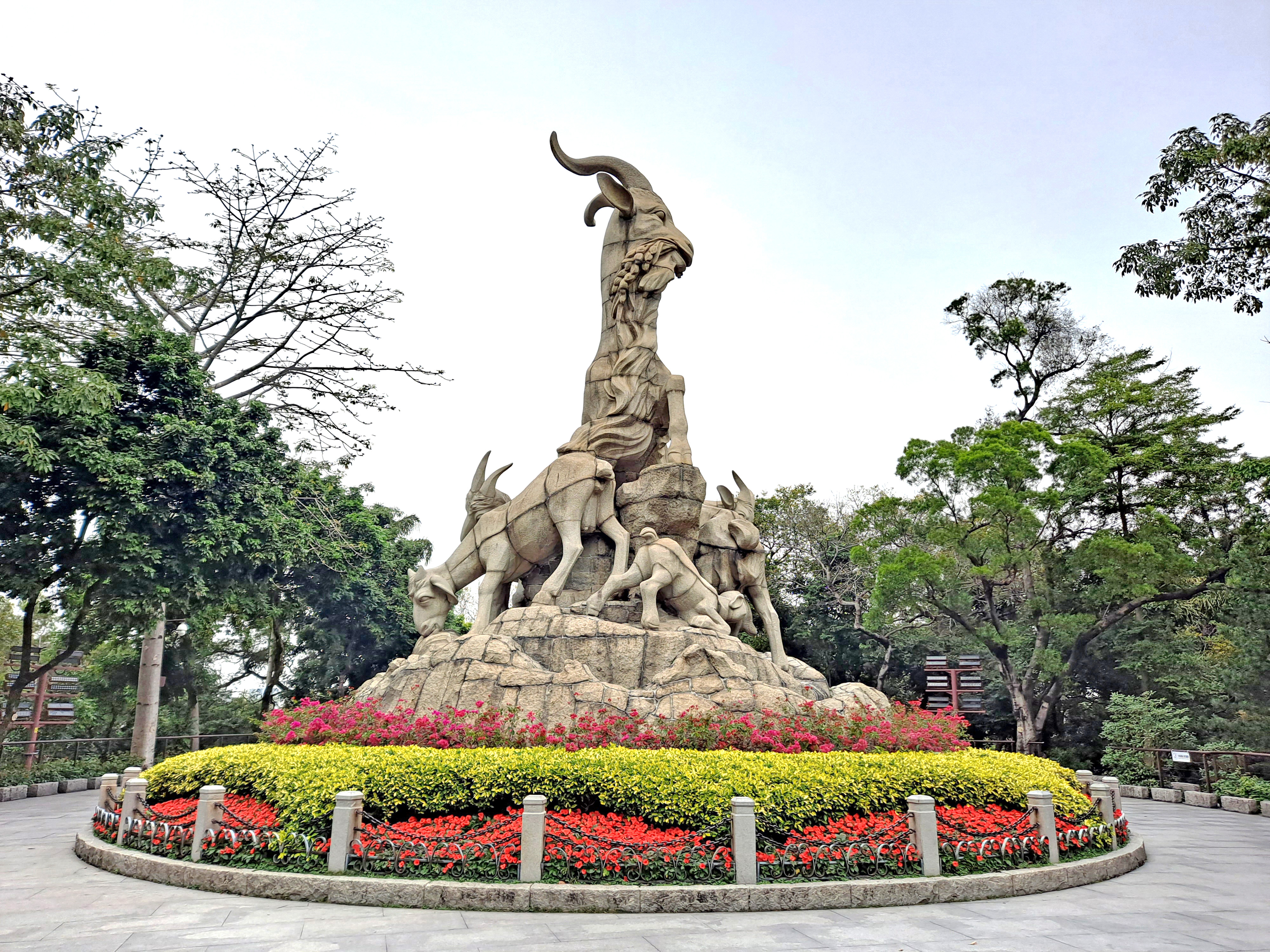
The Statue of Five Goats in Yuexiu Garden in Guangzhou

The Legend of Five Goats comes from the ancient Guangzhou city, and is an origin of Guangzhou's nicknames like 'City of Five Goats', 'City of the Goat', 'City of the Rice'. It is also the origin of many Guangzhou local brands' names. The name can earliest be seen in poetry of Tang dynasty, and the related legendry can be dated back to Jin dynasty. Though the legendary had several versions, it was unified after Ming dynasty. Usually the Legend of Five Goats reflects the history that Lingnan people was colonized by Zhongyuan ancestors. In 2007, this legend was collected into the first batch of The Masterpieces of the Oral and Intangible Heritage of Humanity of Guangzhou.

== Content of the legend ==
It is said that in ancient Guangzhou, there was a time when a drought lasted many years. Food was in extremely short supply and people struggled to avoid starvation. One day, suddenly, a holy melody spread in the air and a five-colour cloud drifted in the sky from the South China Sea. Then five gods, who were wearing five different colours of clothing and rode five different coloured goats, appeared with the cloud, each one held a sheaf of wheat with six stalks. They gave the wheat to the people, left the five goats, and they left by the clouds. People spread the grains to the ground. From then on, Guangzhou had regular winds and rains and rich harvests, and the five god goats became stone goats, standing on the hill. This is how the nicknames of Guangzhou came about.

== Ancient records ==
The literal recordings of this legendary can be dated back to Jin Dynasty, during which Pei Yuan wrote in his essay Guangzhou Ji.' Taiping Yulan (The Northern Song Dynasty, in 983) also refers to the descriptions of 'Guangzhou Ji'—"On the Guangzhou court hall's beam, there are images of the five goats. People also made bags for grains, which hangs under the images. It is said that when Gao Gu was the Prime Minister of Chu, five goats held the grains to Chu, so the people painted for them...Guangzhou has vast plain, so the paints are auspicious signs." It also refers to Junguo Zhi of Tang Dynasty, "Guangzhou, when Teng Xiu was minister of the state of Eastern Wu during the late Three Kingdoms period, he came to Wei State. Five gods rode five different-color goats came and picked him and went away. Now people drew the pictures of the five gods and five goats for luck." Taiping Huanyu Ji, which was written in 984 continued on the record of Xunan Yuezhi of Tang Dynasty and said, "There is an old saying that five gods came, riding five-color goats with six grains". It shall be noticed that the earliest version of Jin Dynasty does not have the gods. The reason why it appeared and replaced the five goats and became the heroes in the later versions is because of the popularity of Taoism in Northern and Southern dynasties.

After Tang Dynasty, "Five Goats" and "City of the Goat" gradually became nicknames of the ancient Guangzhou city, which perfectly shows the legends' influences on local people. According to the fantastic legendary stories of Tang Dynasty, at that time, people had sacrificed five goats in the temples of the Town God. And the earliest similar convention was in Southern Han, when people built "Five Gods Taoist temples" to worship the gods. Zhang Li, military commissioner the Northern Song Dynasty during Zhenghe's era, recorded the five goats' legend completely in Rebuilding the Five Gods Temple of Guangzhou and illustrated that the purpose of building the Five Gods' Temple was to memory the place where the five gods arrived. In this record, Zhang quoted Nanyue Lingbiao Youji and Tu Jing and made the story more specific, "At the very beginning, there were five gods, each holding a wheat with six stalks, arrived riding five goats. Their clothes and goats are all in different colors, which is altogether five. After they had left the wheats to the people, the gods flew away and the goats became stone statues. So the Guangzhou people built a temple at the place where the gods arrived."

In terms of the specific time of the legendary, the recordings vary in different versions. Taiping Yulan thinks there are two versions, which are relatively during Chu and Teng Xiu's inauguration in the Three Kingdoms period. Rebuilding the Five Gods Temple of Guangzhou has three versions, they are: Zhao Tuo's period in Han Dynasty; Teng Xiu in Wu Dynasty of The Three Kingdoms Period and Guo Pu in Jin Dynasty. But in Guangdong Xinyu, written by Qu Dajun, who lived at the end of Ming Dynasty and the beginning of Qing dynasty, said that this story happened during king Yi of Zhou. 'The Five Goat Stone' in this book recorded, "during Yi's time of Zhou Period, there were five gods in the Southern sea, each wore clothes in different color, and their goats' color are separately in accordance with their clothes. They each appeared with a wheat with six stalks and then left them to the people, and wished, 'wish the earth has no starvation anymore'. They flew away after saying this, and the goats turned into stones." This version is quite similar to the modern ones, for it contains all the key elements of the legendary.

== Symbolic meanings ==
After the 20th century, people began to carry on mythic study of 'The Legend of Five Goats'. Famous historian Ceng Zhongmian rose an opinion in 1948 that the legendary and related stories are pre-historical colonial myths. Because at that time, goat is livestock of Northwestern part of Zhongyuan in China, where for Guangzhou is in the south. What is more, the wheat the gods holding were rice which represents harvest in Zhongyuan. So the historical origin of this legendary comes from a historical event: at the end of Western Zhou, Ji people could not bear the oppression of Chu people, so they moved south to Lingnan along the Xiang River, with livestock like goats and grains like wheats with them, and spread these two things in the south China in the following years. This is an extraction and improvement for the story of Yue people accepted the advanced culture of Zhongyuan and stepped into civilization.

Modern studies usually think this legendary contains many historical events. One of them is Chu people brought high-producing rice to Lingnan. The surname of the ancestors of Chu's royal family is "Mi" (芈), which has the same meaning as "Baa" ("Mie" (咩) in Chinese), which is also the onomatopoeia of goats. The second is as at the end of Western Zhou, due to the oppression of Chu, Ji people immigrated to Guangzhou and the Pearl River Delta with goats and grains. The third is derived from Guangzhou Ji, in which it says that "When Gao Gu was the Prime Minister of king Wei of Chu", so people thinks that during the Warring States Period, it was Gao Gu and his family that brought rice and grains to Guangzhou and the Zhujiang Delta. Gao Gu's offspring's surname is "Jiang" (姜), which consists of "Yang" (羊: goats) and "Nv" (女: female) in Chinese characters, that is why people used goats to indicate Gao Gu's family.

However, there are also scholars think "Yang" (Goats) actually means "Quan" (Dogs) in Chu dialect, so the legendary of the five goats actually is adapted from the story "The Dogs Get Rice" from Zhuang and Dong minority as well as Nanyue minority. After this Lingnan story has been brought into Chu, it was collected and revised by Zhongyuan intellectuals and was brought into Lingnan again. So the "five colors goats" actually are five "five-colored dogs"— Panhu (盘瓠).

== Related objects ==
=== Names of places and buildings ===
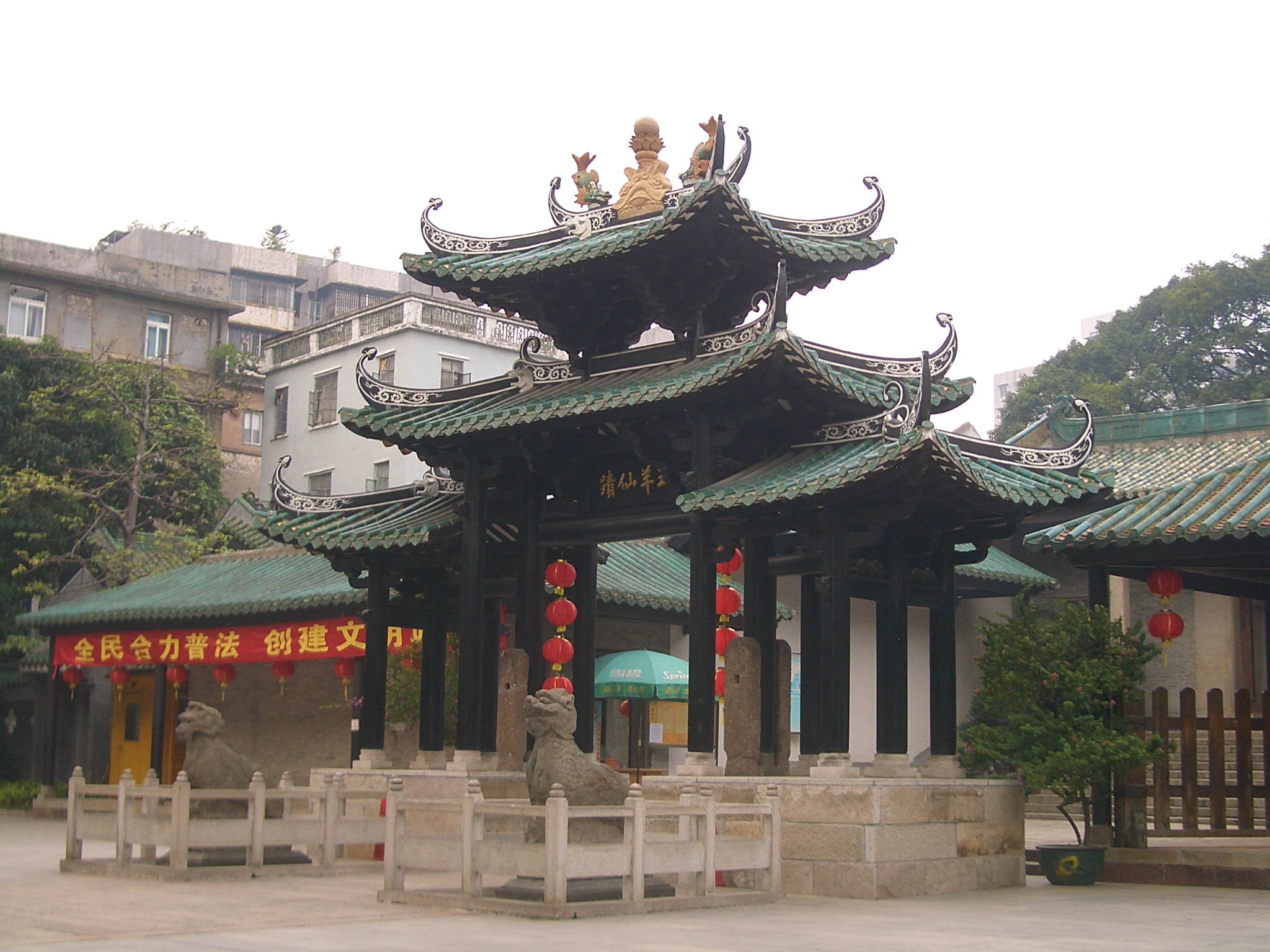
Five Gods Taoism Temple

The earliest physical "evidence" of ‘The Legend of Five Goats' is the Five Gods Taoism Temple in Guangzhou. There has been a temple that in memory of the five gods in Northern Song Dynasty in Shixian Fang (now is around Provincial Financial Department in Guangren Road). During Jiading's time of Southern Song dynasty, it moved to Yuye pond of West Lake, which is now near West Lake Avenue and is called "Fengzhen Taoism Temple". At the end of Nan Song, it moved to now Guangren Road. In 1368, Hongwu's time of Ming Dynasty, it was destroyed in fire, so in 1377, it moved to Po Mountain and was kept until now. During the almost 700 years, there had been two renewals relatively in 1469 in Ming Dynasty and 1723 in Qing Dynasty. During the Republic of China (in 1923), in order to raise money for the war, the government sold it at auction and dismissed all the Taoist priests lived in the temple. After the establishment of People's Republic China, the government nationalized it and authorized the Cultural Relics Management Department to manage it. After being repaired and renewed in 1980s, it opened to the public. In March in 1963, the temple was enlisted as the Protected Historic Site of Guangzhou city; in June of 1989, it was raised to the Protected Historic Site of Guangdong. Nowadays, in the Five Gods Taoism Temple, there are statues of five gods, accompanied with five goats, and the five gods are respected as "Gods for Grains". There is also a huge piece of red sandstone with a concave, which is more than one-meter-long and looks like a foot print. Thus it is called "The Traces of God".

Except for the Five Gods Taoism Temple, there are several places that were given names related to the legendary in Guangzhou City. For example, "God's Neighbour Alley" located in Huifu West Road was named because it is near to the Temple. Zhuhai Mid Road was called "Holy Goats street" and "Xihao Street" in Qing Dynasty, but was combined into one and became part of Zhuhai Road. During Jiajing's time in Ming Dynasty, people built Guangzhou new city, and the Southern gate of the outer city was called "Five Goats Gate", which was changed into "Five Gods Gate" during Qing Dynasty, and there was a "Five Goats post" near the gate. Besides, at the beginning of the 1900s, there was a "Five Goats power plant".

In Yuexiu Park, there is also a five-goat statue. It was built in 1959, and now is one of the most famous tourism spot in Guangzhou and is regarded as the landmark of Guangzhou city.

The modern five-goats related places are Five Goats New City in Yuexiu District, as well as the Five-Goats secondary school and primary school, and the Five-Goats station on fifth line of Guangzhou Metro.

==== The holy dance ====
In Song Dynasty, people started to sacrifice live goats for the five gods, and the activity was held along with the holy dance. Modern scholars found the "Holy Dance of Five Goats" of Song Dynasty (in 1114) in Korea's classical book Jinzhuan Yigui, which is a typical official royal dance of Song Dynasty. Gaoli History and Jinzhuan Yigui recorded the performance of this dance: five dancers perform five holy goats, and the leader is the Queen Mother of the Gods, and there are two "Zhuganzi" who are responsible for the aside, and over ten persons who hold flags, joints, dragon fans and phoenix fans, standing on both sides to form a team for the performance. At the very beginning of the dance, the Queen Mother stands in the middle and the four "goats" stand aside. The band performs music—"Wuyun Kairui Chao", the "Zhuganzi" then step into the stage and recite the ode lyrics after the music. When "Wuyun Kairui Chao" ends after being played twice, the Queen Mother comes forward, give a speech, and then back to the team. Then follows the music "WanYe Zhiyao Tu", and the five persons perform the "Five Goats Dance"; then follows the melody of "Buxu Ziqu", the five persons sing and dance, and the team standing on both sides will join the chorus. Finally, the "Wuyun Kairui Chao" music will be played again, the "Zhuganzi" and the Queen Mother give speech separately, then the performance ends.

=== Brands ===
Guangzhou city has many companies and commercial brands that are named after "five goats", such as the Guangzhou Five Goats Machine Constructing Co. Ltd., the Yangcheng Evening News Group; Guangzhou Five Goats Cosmetics Co. Ltd., as well as the local brand Five Goat Ice-cream, Five Goat Bicycle, etc.

In 1925 and 1989, the government of Guangzhou city revealed its emblem. The first one was published in 1926. In the middle, it was the flag of the Republic of China, which was surrounded by five goats, and the around were wheat. The second one was published in 1990, in the middle, it is a five-pointed star, underneath is an artistic Chinese seal character—"羊" and a gold key formed by wheat. But this emblem also was abandoned in 1997. However, these two versions of emblems had also contained the images of the five goats and wheat, from which we can see how important they are for Guangzhou people. In 1936, the government of the Republic of China had also issued a kind of Yixian Bronze coin (now called "Guangdong Five Goats Bronze Coin"). In the front of the coin, a hole surrounded by petals in the middle, above was the date that this coin was made, and underneath the hole was the image of the five goats. In the reverse side of the coin, in the middle was the same hole, but was surrounded by five seal "Yang" characters. The outer sides were surrounded by a stem of wheat and on the other side curved "Yixian", namely, the value of the coin.

Guangzhou Metro logo

The logo of Guangzhou Metro is shaped like ram's horn to indicate "Yang". The city's public transport smartcard is named Yang Cheng Tong, literally means 'Ram City Pass'; its logo is also shaped like ram's horn. In the 2010 Asian Games held in Guangzhou, both the emblem and mascot contained five goats' elements. The emblem of the games was a fire symbol which was similar to the Five Goats Statue in Yuexiu Park and the mascot was consisted of five goats.

== See also ==
- Cantonese folktales
