= Hong Kong Godfather (1985 film) =

1985 Hong Kong film by Wang Lung-wei

- Film poster
- Traditional Chinese: 尖東梟雄
- Simplified Chinese: 尖东枭雄
- Hanyu Pinyin: Jiān Dōng Xiāo Xióng
- Jyutping: Zim1 Dung1 Hiu1 Hung4
- Directed by: Wang Lung-wei
- Screenplay by: Wang Lung-wei
- Produced by: Mona Fong
- Starring: Bryan Leung; Norman Chui; Joyce Tsui; Wang Lung-wei; Richard Cheung
- Cinematography: Nico Wong
- Edited by: Fong Po-wa; Chiang Hsing-lung
- Music by: So Chan-hau
- Production company: Shaw Brothers Studio
- Distributed by: Shaw Brothers Studio
- Release date: 1985
- Running time: 94 minutes
- Country: Hong Kong
- Language: Cantonese
- Box office: HK$3,213,478

Hong Kong Godfather is a 1985 Hong Kong action film written and directed by Wang Lung-wei, who also served as action director and appears in a supporting role, and starring Bryan Leung.

== Plot ==
Mad Wai (Bryan Leung) is a former triad member who has retired from the underworld to raise his daughter after his wife died. When rival triad Jiaxi Lan (Wong Chun), who led a gang in Chinatown, Manhattan, decides to take over territories in East Tsim Sha Tsui belonging to Wai's former boss Han (Shih Kien), Lan manipulates Han's cowardly underling Rotten Chi (Shum Wai) to betray and kill his boss. Upon hearing the death, Wai vows to seek vengeance for Han. At this time, Lan also kidnaps Wai's daughter. Wai, alongside his old friends Playboy Lung (Norman Chu) and Sergeant Lam (Richard Cheung), engage in a bloody battle against Lan to avenge their former boss and save Wai's beloved daughter.

== Cast ==
- Bryan Leung as Mad Wai
- Norman Chui as Playboy Lung
- Richard Cheung as Sergeant Lam
- Shum Wai as Rotten Chi
- Wong Chun as Jiaxi Lan
- Shih Kien as Boss Han
- Kong Lung as Ting No. 3
- Joyce Tsui as Connie
- Hon Lai-fan as Boss Han's relative
- Fong Yue as Boss Han's wife
- Chui Fat as Lan's hitman
- Patrick Gamble as Lan's hitman
- Wayne Archer as Lan's hitman
- Paula Tocha as Lan's hitman
- Wang Lung-wei as Lan's hitman
- Pomson Shi as Lan's hitman
- Ken Boyle as Police Commissioner
- Yat Poon-chai as Officer
- Luk Ying-hung as Officer
- Fung King-man as Uncle Chin
- Kam Tin-chue as Uncle Te
- Huang Pa-ching as Uncle
- Titus Ho as Chan Hao
- Chui Kin-wah as Bus driver
- Chan Ming-wai as Boss Han's thug
- Lam Moon-wah as Han's bodyguard
- Chung Wing as Han's bodyguard
- Tang Chiu-yau as Han's bodyguard
- Kong Lung as Han's bodyguard
- Chang Sing-kwong as Han's bodyguard
- Wong Chi-keung as Victim at casino
- Chan Hung as Casino fighter
- Cho Yuen-tat as Boss Han's man
- Lee Yiu-king as Boss Han's man
- Lee Fat-yuen as Security guard
- Tong Pau-chung as Security guard
- Yee Tin-hung as Security guard
- Lung Ying as Security guard
- Chan Kwok-keung as Security guard
- Nai Tim-choi as Lan's thug
- Stephen Chan as Lan's thug
- Ho Wing-cheung as Lan's thug
- Ting Tong-chi
- Errol Chan
- Lau Chi-ming as Security guard
- Wong Wai-fai
- Lam Fu-wai
- Yiu Man-kei

== Reception ==
=== Critical ===
Hong Kong Godfather received generally positive reviews. Jean Lukitush of Kung Fu Cinema rated the film three and half stars out of five and gave a positive review praising its brutal and realistic action scenes and the performance of the cast. Paul Taggart of Far East Films rated the three out of five stars and writes "Hong Kong Godfather keeps it straight and simple, offering bloody thrills with a cast and crew honed on kung fu movies smashing their way into the gangster arena."

On the other hand, Roy Hrab of DVD Verdict gave the film a mixed review and writes "Gratuitous nudity, extreme violence, plentiful bloodletting, cheesy sets, even cheesier fashion, discount special effects, and lousy acting; it's all on display in Hong Kong Godfather, a Shaw Brothers production that makes for a fairly entertaining distraction."

=== Box office ===
The film grossed HK$3,213,478 at the Hong Kong box office during its theatrical run from 2 to 8 November 1985 in Hong Kong.
