= Tibetan White Crane =

Chinese martial art

Tibetan White Crane 西藏白鶴拳 (Bak Hok Pai 白鶴派)
- Also known as: Pak Hok Pai (Alt. Cantonese), Bai He Pai (Mandarin); Closely related to: • Lama Pai (喇嘛派) • Hop Ga Kuen (俠家拳)
- Country of origin: China (Qinghai and Guangdong)
- Date of formation: 15th century
- Creator: Adatuo (阿達陀, Ah Dat To), also known as the Dai Dat Lama (大達喇嘛)
- Famous practitioners: Sing Lung (星龍), Ng Siu-chung (吳肇鍾), Chan Hak Fu (陳克夫), Kwong Poon Fu (鄺本夫), Luk Chi Fu (陸智夫)
- Ancestor arts: Lion's Roar (獅子吼)

Tibetan White Crane
- Traditional Chinese: 西藏白鶴拳 (白鶴派)
- Simplified Chinese: 西藏白鹤拳 (白鹤派)
Transcriptions
Standard Mandarin
- Hanyu Pinyin: Xīzàng Báihèquán (Báihèpài)
Yue: Cantonese
- Jyutping: sai1 zong6 baak6 hok6 kyun4 (baak6 hok6 paai3)

Tibetan White Crane (Chinese: 西藏白鶴拳, "Tibetan White Crane Fist"), also known in Cantonese as Bak Hok Pai (白鶴派, "White Crane Style"), is a Chinese martial art with origins in 15th-century Tibetan culture that has developed deep roots in southern China. Tibetan White Crane became so established in Guangdong, Hong Kong and Macau by the twentieth century that it was accepted as a local martial art in that region. From there it has spread around the world.

Lama Pai (喇嘛派) and Hop Ga Kuen (俠家拳) are closely related branches of the same lineage descending from the same original art, which the founder called Lion's Roar (獅子吼). This style is not related to Fujian White Crane (福建白鶴拳), which developed independently in Fujian Province within the Southern Shaolin Five Animals tradition.

Tibetan White Crane played an important role at a key pivot point in Chinese and worldwide popular culture, when a 1954 charity match between a Tibetan White Crane master and a master of tai chi attracted massive attendance and avid media coverage, generated broad acceptance and celebration of Chinese martial arts, and resulted in new waves of wuxia (martial hero) literature and kung-fu film that continue to this day.

== History ==
=== The white crane and the ape ===
In Tibetan White Crane tradition, the origins of this martial art can be traced to the 15th century, and a Tibetan lama whose name has been transliterated into Mandarin as Adatuo (阿達陀). In Cantonese his name is pronounced Ah Dat To, and he also sometimes known as the Dai Dat Lama (大達喇嘛).

Adatuo lived in what today is China's Qinghai province, where he learned Tibetan wrestling sports and joint-locking techniques before becoming a monk. Then one day while meditating in the wilderness, he observed a battle between an ape and a white crane, in which the crane gracefully avoided the ape's attacks and aggressively counterattacked. Based on this experience, he developed a new martial art based upon the ape's powerful swinging and grabbing, and the crane's evasive movements and vital point striking.

Some writers have voiced skepticism of this story, as this parallels the legendary origins of other Chinese martial arts. For example, both Wing Chun and tai chi are said to have been inspired by battles between cranes and snakes. This story has unique aspects, with the snake's role taken by an ape, and the story is more vicious, with the ape losing an eye during the encounter. The story is also more detailed, as Adatuo then compassionately nurses the injured ape and develops his art while playing with it. Nevertheless, the similarities make some uncomfortable.

Lion's Roar (獅子吼), a Buddhist term commonly used by Tibetan practitioners, was the name Adatuo chose for his new martial art. Tradition states that he, his disciples, and the following generations continued to develop the art during the Ming and Qing dynasties. Tradition aside, Tibet is home to a fierce martial culture, and Qinghai has long been a place where Tibetan, Mongolian, and Chinese cultures encountered each other, and where martial arts concepts such as animal-based styles have been absorbed and developed locally. In addition, no doubts have been raised about the overall history of the art from the Qing dynasty on.

=== Qing patronage ===
The Qing dynasty was founded by Manchu conquerors from the northeast who followed Tibetan Buddhism and felt a strong cultural affinity with co-religionists of the north and west like Mongols and Tibetans. It was natural that they would value and support a martial art from Tibet, inviting masters to teach, train, and serve at the capitol in Beijing.

Lion's Roar masters served in the imperial palace guard, and official support for a wide range of Tibetan Buddhist pursuits is evident in the massive Lama Temple of Beijing. But as Qing rule and the state of the nation declined, one master from the west brought the art to the south instead.

=== Journey to the South ===
In 1865, 11th-generation master Sing Lung (聖龍, 星龍, or 升隆) arrived in the Guangdong area via Sichuan. Unlike his predecessors, this lama was no friend of the Manchu rulers. He quickly made a name for himself as a fighter – legend has it he defeated and then befriended a pirate, among other adventures – and began training a group of Lion's Roar disciples.

Residing at a monastery (Clear Cloud Temple, 清雲寺, or Blessed Cloud Temple, 慶雲寺), at first he trained only other monks. But his last two disciples were laymen who became the founders of two new branch lineages:

- Wong Yan-lam (王隱林) was leader of a famous group of anti-Qing rebels known as the Ten Tigers of Canton. He earned the title "hop" (俠, knight or martial hero) due to his many anti-Manchu exploits and good deeds. After Sing Long's death he worked across China as a caravan guard, and over time blended his Lion's Roar training with techniques gleaned from encounters with Hung Ga stylists and from his extensive combat experience. Upon his return to Guangdong he set up a platform and defeated a reported 150 challengers to reestablish himself as a master in the local area. His approach became the basis for a new lineage started by a senior disciple, who made use of his "hop" title to call it Hop Ga Kuen (俠家拳).
- Wong Lam-hoi (黃林開) remained in Guangdong after Sing Long's death, becoming a well-known fighter and a well-respected teacher who attracted many students. He may have emphasized the crane techniques within Lion's Roar, as his most famous disciple certainly did exactly that, renaming this lineage after the white crane as well: Bak Hok Pai (白鶴派), or White Crane Style.

=== Southern schisms ===
Lama Pai (喇嘛派), meaning "Tibetan Buddhist Master Style", began as an informal name for Lion's Roar but had replaced it by the end of the nineteenth century. Today's Lama Pai lineages began with Wong Yan-lam's disciples Choi Yit Gung (蔡懿恭, Pinyin: Cài Yìgōng) and Jyu Chuyhn (Jyu Jik Chuyhn, 朱亦傳). Jyu's disciple Chan Tai San (陳泰山) also trained with a Tibetan monk from Manchuria representing yet another Lion's Roar lineage.

Chan believed that because Jyu trained with both lay disciples of Sing Hong, Wong Yan-lam and Wong Lam-hoi, only Lama Pai represented an authentic and complete version of this tradition. As Chan's disciple David A. Ross has noted, Lama Pai had by then evolved to represent the vast tradition of Western Chinese martial arts as practiced by followers of Tibetan Buddhism of many ethnicities, and had further evolved through interaction with northern and southern Chinese martial arts. But two new styles stemming from the lineages of Wong Yan-lam and Wong Lam-hoi took this evolution one step further:

Hop Ga Kuen (俠家拳) was founded by Wong Yan-lam's disciple Wong Hong-wing (王漢榮) who chose that new name — which means "Martial Hero Family Fist" — in honor of his master and reportedly at the suggestion of Dr. Sun Yat-sen (孫中山), founder of the Republic of China, to create some distance from the lamas of the imperial guard. Wong Yan-lam's innovations, some based on exchanges with Hung Ga stylists, include an emphasis on hand strikes, mostly low kicks, and fierce no-mercy attacks, with equal weight given to ape, crane, and other animal-inspired techniques.

Bak Hok Pai (白鶴派) or "White Crane Style" was founded by Wong Lam-hoi's disciple Ng Siu-chung (吳肇鍾). Ng is known for defeating the foremost of the "Five Tigers Who Went South to Jiangnan" (五虎下江南, see Central Guoshu Institute). It is lost to history whether the name of this art was selected solely to emphasize crane techniques, or to avoid association with Hop Ga's veneration of another master, or to move away from association with the Manchu era, or all of the above, but today with the passage of time Bak Hok Pai is also called "Tibetan White Crane" to distinguish it from other white crane techniques, forms and styles. This art of course emphasizes crane techniques, with a defensive approach, evasive footwork, high and low kicks, and aggressive hand counterattacks to vital points.

Ng moved to Macau and served as White Crane grandmaster there, in Hong Kong, and worldwide for many years. In martial arts circles his most famous disciple was Chan Hak Fu (陳克夫), whom we shall discuss in more detail below.

=== Southern success ===
After the fall of the Qing dynasty in 1911, the descendants of Lion's Roar no longer had official support. The Jing Wu organization and the government-led Guo Shu institute focused on Han Chinese martial arts, and mostly northern styles at that. But in Guangdong, Hong Kong, and Macau, the three new Lion's Roar lineages developed deep roots.

By the 1950s, Bak Hok Pai was one of the most well-known styles in Hong Kong and Macau, and popular in nearby Guangdong and Guangxi as well, alongside native southern arts like Wing Chun, Hung Ga, and Choy Lay Fut. Grandmaster Ng Siu-chung and his senior disciples Chan Hak Fu (陳克夫), Kwong Poon Fu (鄺本夫), and Luk Chi Fu (陸智夫) — the "Three Fus" or "Three Masters" of White Crane (白鶴三夫) — proudly presided over schools that trained many Hong Kong and Macau officials and celebrities, including local police. One notable practitioner was the actor Kwan Tak-hing, who played Wong Fei-hung in at least 77 of his 130 films. (Kwan had to learn some Hung Ga to move like the historical Wong Fei-hung.)

For many in the region, this was the only White Crane style they had heard of. Fujian White Crane, in any variant and under any name including Shaolin White Crane, was little known there. When someone in Hong Kong said "White Crane Style" (Bak Hok Pai), they meant Tibetan White Crane. It was for all intents and purposes a local martial art. Meanwhile, in Guangdong Province, in the 1950s Lama Pai and Hop Ga masters established themselves as military trainers and as top competitors and coaches in the mainland's new wushu sports organizations, and in Hong Kong a Hop Ga center was established by the 1960s.

=== Wu vs. Chan, 1954 ===
Tibetan White Crane was at the heart of a major pivot point in Chinese and worldwide popular culture, when in 1954 Chan Hak Fu of Macau faced off against Hong Kong's recently arrived Wu Gongyi (吳公儀) in a popular public match organized for charity and held in Macau. Master Chan represented not only Grandmaster Ng Siu-Chung's Bak Hok Pai against Grandmaster Wu's Wu-style tai chi. He also represented natives of the south against newcomers from the north, Cantonese speakers vs. Mandarin speakers, external vs. internal kung-fu, modern training (Chan) vs. traditional practice (Wu), Macau (Chan) vs. Hong Kong (Wu), and yes, a Tibetan Buddhist martial art against a Han Chinese Daoist art.

The fight's outcome is not the most important aspect, especially as it was disappointingly halted after only two shortened rounds, with the result declared as "no winner, no loser, no draw". An unsophisticated bout by today's standards, all that can be said is that Wu impressively held his own against a much younger opponent, bloodying Chan's nose and severely bruising his arms, while Chan showed great skill and aggressiveness in a good demonstration of the techniques and strategies of Tibetan White Crane within the strict limitations set by the organizers such as no kicking.

More important, as Y.L. Yip has argued, this massively attended event and its avid media coverage generated broad acceptance and celebration of Chinese martial arts throughout modern Chinese culture, resulting in a new wave of wuxia fiction and kung-fu film, from the books of authors like Louis Cha (Jin Yong) to the movies of Bruce Lee, followed by second and third waves with stars like Jackie Chan and Jet Li.

Martial arts schools also benefited from this explosion of interest of course. Wu-style tai chi attracted many new students in Hong Kong and abroad, and White Crane expanded strongly as well. Chan Hak Fu alone opened Bak Hok Pai schools in Australia, the US, Canada, the Philippines, Singapore, Malaysia, Italy, and Israel, as well as Hong Kong and Macau.

=== From mid-century to today ===
Tibetan White Crane

After Grandmaster Ng Siu-Chung's passing in 1968, Bak Hok Pai entered the 1970s as a remarkably unified art under a committee of masters in charge of the White Crane Athletic Federation, which coordinated as many as 35 schools around the world including 25 in Hong Kong and Singapore. But during that decade the committee introduced controversial changes meant to simplify the curriculum and increase the sense of immediate satisfaction among modern students, on the theory that the traditional fifteen year path to mastery was not the best way to market the art.

In response, some masters including Chan Hak Fu parted ways with the committee. There are now schools in 10 countries under the International White Crane Association (國際白鶴派拳會) founded by Chan, along with schools in 9 countries under the International Pak Hok Pai Cheung Kwok Wah Martial Arts Association (國際白鶴派張國華國術總會), and more affiliated with the Ng Siu Chung Martial Arts Institute (吳肇鍾白鶴國術健身學會), as well as independent schools.

Hop Ga

The first to establish Hop Ga outside mainland China was a colorful character named Ng Yim-ming (伍冉明, Pinyin: Wǔ Rǎnmíng, a.k.a. Harry Ng, 1908–1972). A student of Wong Yan-lam and disciple of Wong Hong-wing, he was an actor in traditional Chinese opera and a Chinese air force pilot with the Flying Tigers before founding a Hong Kong Hop Ga training center in the 1960s, then immigrating to the US in 1970. He selected his disciple David Chin (1943–2020) as official representative of the art in the US. Chin and his brother disciples Ku Chi Wai, Jack Hoey, and Tony Galvin, and their disciples, have founded Hop Ga schools across the country.

Hop Ga continues to thrive in Guangdong Province and to spread around the world from there. Deng Gum Tao (邓锦涛, Pinyin: Dèng Jǐntāo, 1902–1987) and his son Deng Zeng Gong (邓镇江, Pinyin: Dèng Zhènjiāng, 1945–), masters of Hop Ga, Hung Ga, and Yang-style tai chi, trained disciples who went on to become wushu competition champions and coaches, and at least one also became a police trainer and a film actor and advisor. Several have become prominent abroad, including Kong Fanwei (孔籓偉) in the Netherlands, Melissa Fung Chan in New Zealand, Liang Xiao Wang in France, and David Rogers in the United Kingdom.

Lama Pai

After the founding of the People's Republic of China, Chan Tai San and other disciples of Lama Pai masters Jyu Chyuhn and Choi Yit Gung of Guangdong competed and coached in Chinese military and civilian wushu competitions, and trained military personnel in close quarters combat. They and the next generations went on to establish Lama Pai centers in China and abroad, founded by Chan in New York, by Lei Fei San in Guangdong (said to have thousands of students), by Lo Wai Keung (罗威强, Luó Wēiqiáng) in Hong Kong, and by Tony (Bok Tong) Jay in Vancouver. By the 1990s, Chan estimated Lama Pai was successfully represented in at least six cities worldwide.

Martial Brotherhood

Tibetan White Crane, Hop Ga, and Lama Pai masters maintain good relations between all branches of the Lion's Roar lineage, sometimes cross-training and generally maintaining a collegial competitive atmosphere. In addition, since the 1954 Wu vs. Chan event, White Crane masters have maintained longstanding friendships with masters of Wu-style tai chi, especially between the families and disciples of Chan Hak Fu and Wu Gongyi.

== Characteristics ==
Tibetan White Crane is a complete system, with long and short range techniques, and external, internal, and weapons forms. It shares four Lion's Roar fighting principals with its brother arts Lama Pai and Hong Ga. The following are partial excerpts from the White Crane Style Lion's Roar Boxing Classic (白鹤派狮子吼拳经):

- Chan (殘, Jyutping: caan4; Pinyin: cán), Ruthlessness: "When eliminating weeds, one must do a conscientious job in fulfilling one's duty. When shooting a tiger, one must kill it. If weeds are not cleared properly they will grow back. If a tiger is only wounded, it may return to bite you. Therefore, whether fighting an elephant or a rabbit, a lion would use its full strength. ...be careful and cautious; do not release and underestimate the enemy... this is called 'cruelty' or 'ruthlessness'."
- Sim (閃, Jyutping: sim2; Pinyin: shǎn), To Evade: "The body being in balance... Only when it is in motion can it easily escape.... When it can easily escape it cannot be grabbed or gotten hold of. When it is in cyclic motion like a wheel, its function is not to intrude... In yielding, do not yield too far; in avoiding, do not do it with excess swiftness. The ten thousand methods that lead to, or assist in, this achievement lie in turning sideways and slanting the body. This is called 'to evade'."
- Chuen (穿, Jyutping: cyun1; Pinyin: chuān), To Pierce: "Whenever the opponent has extended out and not yet withdrawn, or he has withdrawn but is not yet back to his former stance, that is 'in between'. 'In between' is the crack in the world... One should take advantage of this like shooting. This is called 'to pierce' to show that it is directed to the 'in between'."
- Jeet (截, Jyutping: zit6; Pinyin: jié), To Intercept: "...before the strength of the enemy is issued, forbid its issuing forth. When the enemy’s offensive force is expended, then take advantage of his (force) fading or losing ground... Softness should be employed to conquer the hard, and the strong points should be employed to win the weak points. In doing things, judge on the motive; this is called 'to intercept', or 'to put a stop to the intended action'."

Tibetan White Crane and its brother arts emphasize attacks over blocking. If an attack is to be parried, a "stop hit" that diverts it while also striking at the opponent is preferred over "block-counter" techniques, though the latter are taught as well. But a practitioner never attacks first, relying on footwork to evade and then counterattacking with unrelenting ferocity. In that context, White Crane can be called a defensive art.

Practitioners are often photographed as if prepared for long-range techniques, with one leg in the air and hands in beak-like form ready to strike at vital points, but the art also emphasizes short range counterattacks including powerful punches. All punches — straight, uppercut, overhead, and roundhouse — are delivered in circular motions, with power generated from the waist as the arms extend in opposite directions front and back. The resulting relentless blows make White Crane unsuited for tournament point-sparring.

The style's photogenic one-legged stances are often a preparation for movement rather than kicks, though these stances also enable fast kicking without any "telegraphed" warning. The one-legged stances are just as often a trick to lure the opponent in, resulting in a whirlwind of counterattacks. Two types of footwork, inspired by the ape and the crane, enable evasion and attacks. White Crane includes a limited number of kicks, three low and one high jump kick.

Its brother arts Lama Pai and Hop Ga resort to kicks even less often, typically low kicks. In addition they have their own evasive footwork, and give equal weight to ape, crane, and other animal-inspired techniques, but they share White Crane's powerful and relentless punching technique.

Although the requirements may vary among schools today, traditional advancement in Tibetan White Crane required mastery of 24 forms, including 14 empty hand forms and 10 weapons forms. At the advanced level a soft form called the "Cotton Needle Set" is practiced for accuracy and alignment that enables effective finger strikes. The Cotton Needle Set was traditionally often practiced on 14 "Plum Blossom Poles" (梅花桩), each about one foot wide and 10 to 15 feet high, set 21 inches apart. Those poles were sometimes also used for sparring, with wooden stakes or even knives set into the ground below. Today the poles are often replaced with circles painted on the floor, and though some still use real poles they likely no longer plant sharp objects around them.

Some Tibetan White Crane, Hop Ga, and Lama Pai schools also teach southern Chinese lion dance and perform at cultural events.

== Bibliography ==
Albright, Carl A. (March 1989). "Tibetan Lama Kung-Fu: Rare Art of the Ancient Monks". Inside Kung-Fu. Vol. 16, no. 3. CFW Enterprises, Inc. ISSN 0199-8501.

Blair, Donivan (Fall 2019). "They Fight Like They Train: Tibetan White Crane". Kung Fu Tai Chi. TC Media International, Inc. ISSN 1050-2173.

Chan, Tai-san (September 1993). "A Tradition Whose Time has Come: Lama Pai Kung-Fu". Inside Kung-Fu. Vol. 20, no. 9. Translated by Ross, David A. CFW Enterprises, Inc. ISSN 0199-8501.

Chan, Tai-san (October 1996). "Chan Tai-San's Journey of a Lifetime". Inside Kung-Fu. Vol. 25, no. 10. Translated by Ross, David A.; Innocenzi, Stephen. CFW Enterprises, Inc. ISSN 0199-8501.

Chin, David; Staples, Michael (1980). Hop Gar Kung Fu. Unique Publications. ISBN 0-86568-005-1.

Ching, Gene (July 2006). "Keeping Secrets: Grandmaster David Chin's Legacy of Hop Gar Rebels and Guang Ping Tai Chi Revolutionaries". Kung Fu Tai Chi. TC Media International, Inc. ISSN 1050-2173.

Gilbert, Geri (November 1983). "The Deadly Fighting Principles of White Crane Kung Fu". Black Belt. Vol. 21, no. 11. Rainbow Publications. ISSN 0277-3066.

Hallander, Jane (1983). The Complete Guide to Kung-Fu Fighting Styles. CFW Enterprises, Inc. ISBN 9780865680654.

Kelly, Jeffrey J. (October 1990). "Tibetan White Crane Kung Fu - A Beauty Within a Beastly Fighting Art". Black Belt. Vol. 28, no. 10. Rainbow Publications. ISSN 0277-3066.

Ng, Siu Zhong; 吴, 肇锺 (1951). 白鹤派狮子吼拳经 [White Crane Style Lion's Roar Boxing Classic]. 中央印館. No ISBN. Hong Kong Public Library catalog number 000183953.

Ross, David (October 1994). "Lama Kung-Fu's 8 Fundamentals". Inside Kung-Fu. Vol. 21, no. 10. CFW Enterprises, Inc. ISSN 0199-8501.

Staples, Michael (September 1974). "Fighting Gung-Fu: Hop Gar Style". Inside Kung-Fu. Vol. 1, no. 10. CFW Enterprises, Inc. ISSN 0199-8501.

Yee, James (July 1974). "Master Quentin Fong: Death Throes of a Crane". Inside Kung-Fu. Vol. 1, no. 8. CFW Enterprises, Inc. ISSN 0199-8501.

Yip, Y.L. (Autumn 2002). "Pivot — Taiji's Wu Gong Yee vs. White Crane's Chan Hak Fu". Qi: The Journal of Traditional Eastern Health and Fitness. Vol. 12, no. 3. Insight Publishers. ISSN 1056-4004.
