= Profile in Anger =

1984 Hong Kong film by Bryan Leung

- Film poster
- Traditional Chinese: 無名火
- Simplified Chinese: 无名火
- Hanyu Pinyin: Wú Míng Huǒ
- Jyutping: Mou4 Ming4 Fo2
- Directed by: Bryan Leung
- Written by: Bryan Leung; Ho Hong-kiu
- Produced by: Raymond Chow; Leonard Ho
- Starring: Bryan Leung; Philip Ko; Michael Chan; Damian Lau; Chang Yi; Pat Ha; Mabel Kwong
- Cinematography: Kung Mu-to; Danny Lee; Cheung Yiu-cho
- Edited by: Peter Cheung
- Music by: Danny Chung
- Production companies: Golden Harvest; Paragon Films
- Distributed by: Golden Harvest
- Release date: 3 May 1984
- Running time: 85 minutes
- Country: Hong Kong
- Language: Cantonese
- Box office: HK$2,325,275

Profile in Anger is a 1984 Hong Kong action film produced by Raymond Chow and Leonard Ho, written, action choreographed, directed by and starring Bryan Leung. This film is Leung's directorial debut and is also the first film Leung starred in that is set in modern day.

== Plot ==
Leung Chun-yue (Bryan Leung) is a famous architect who is about to marry his girlfriend, Hydi (Pat Ha). He is, by chance, reunited with Wong Kin-hang (Damian Lau), a long lost friend whom Leung invites to be his house as a guest. Wong is now in Hong Kong with the aim to kill jewel king, Wai Kit (Chang Yi), who has ruined his family. Wong fails in his attempt but is captured and tortured by Wai. Wong warns Wai all evidence against him is being kept by a friend. Mistaking Leung to be the friend, Wai send two killers, Honey (Philip Ko) and Man (Michael Chan), to get Leung. Man kills Hydi but Leung manages to escape. Leung has just read Wong's diary and know everything about Wong. Now Leung decides to take law into his own hands in order to challenges Wai and his gang.

== Cast ==
- Bryan Leung as Leung Chun-yue
- Philip Ko as Honey
- Michael Chan as Man
- Damian Lau as Wong Kin-hang
- Chang Yi as Wai Kit
- Pat Ha as Hydi Lam
- Mabel Kwong as Honey's girlfriend
- Tong Kam-tong as Wai Kit's henchman
- Tai San as Tarzan
- Law Keung as Keung
- Leung Hak-shun as Doctor
- Homer Cheung as Rascal teasing Hydi
- Hon Kong as Chang
- Ronnie as Priest
- Lee Chun-wah as Wai Kit's thug
- Wong Siu-ming as Tarzan's thug
