= Chan Tai San =

Chinese martial artist

- T. S. Chan, c. 1980
- Born: 12 July 1920
- Died: 1 September 2004 (aged 84)
- Style: Lama Pai, Choy Lay Fut, and others
- Rank: Grandmaster

Chan Tai San (Chan Tai-San; Chinese: 陳泰山) (July 12, 1920 – September 1, 2004) was a Chinese martial arts grandmaster. Often called one of China's "living treasures", Chan was featured as such on the cover of Inside Kung Fu magazine in 1996.

== Early training and military service ==
Chan said he began kung fu training at age eight under Yee Hoi-Long (余海龍), a stonemason who worked for the Chan family. Yee taught "hung fist", also called "hung kuyhnn" or "village style", a forerunner to Hung Ga, and "Hung Tao Choy Mei" (which means "Hung Head Choy Tail"), later known as Jow Ga, a system combining strong "Hung" style fist work with active Choy-style footwork. Chan learned from Yee for about six years.

Chan was 13 when, after the death of his father, he was sent by his family to the Clear Cloud Temple where he began training in kung fu and Buddhism and was mostly a student of Jyu Jik Chuyhn (朱亦傳). Chan was also taught by the monk Gaai Si Wu Song and trained mostly in the Choy Lay Fut style.

At 17, Chan left the monastery to fight against the Imperial Japanese Army, enlisting in a peasant division which also had some of the most skilled traditional martial arts fighters in China. While in the army, Chan trained and served with Cheung Lai-Chung (張禮泉), a master of Bak Mei or "White Eyebrow" style, and Baahk Mo Jyu (洪瑋翔, nicknamed the "White Haired Devil"), a master of Hung Fut style, and others.

== Career ==
After the war, Chan traveled throughout China meeting and training with more sifu such as Mok Jing-Kiu, head of the Mok family style, Chan Sai-Mo (陳世武), master of Choy Lay Fut style, and Chan Jik Seung (陳績常), master of Bak Mei. In his 40s, Chan went back to the Clear Cloud Temple and learned Lama Pai (喇嘛派) from Jyu Jik Chuyhn. Other arts he trained in were the Southern Eagle Claw, also known as the Ngok Ga (Mandarin: Yue Jia) style, as well as the Jow Ga Style under Jow Biu. Devoting himself to mastering the Tibetan lion's roar system, he trained with various sifu of related lineages such as Deng Gum Tao (鄧錦濤) of Hop Ga, Gung Yuet Gei (孔乙己) of Tibetan White Crane, and Mai Yi Po of the Manchurian Lama Pai lineage.

Chan trained and promoted Chinese martial arts in China and abroad. He was coach of the Guangdong Province martial arts demonstration team from 1980 to 1982, a hand-to-hand fighting (Sanshou) instructor for an elite Fut San military unit, and a member of the executive committee of the Toi San region martial arts association. As a member of the national demonstration team (and through exhibitions at national level tournaments in the United States), Chan demonstrated internal martial arts (Qigong), Iron Palm and Iron Body.

Chan was one of only a few instructors who openly taught the Lama Pai style. When he opened his classes to Americans, there were estimated to be only five other public Lama Pai sifu in the world.
