= Wang Lung-wei =

- Born: July 14, 1949 (age 77); Hong Kong
- Occupations: Actor; director; producer; action choreographer
- Years active: 1974–mid 1990s
- Musical career
- Also known as: Johnny Wang, Wang Lun, Wang Lun-wei, Wang Longwei, Wong Lung-wei
- Genres: Kung fu films, Hong Kong action cinema

Wang Lung-wei (born 1949) is a Hong Kong martial artist, actor, director, producer, and action choreographer, who has starred in over 80 kung fu films, mainly for Shaw Brothers Studios. Wang's first Shaw Brothers film role was as Yu Pi in the 1974 Chang Cheh-directed film Shaolin Martial Arts. This became a pattern, in that he was cast as the villain in the majority of his movies, with Martial Club being a famous exception. In 1985, Wang moved behind the camera, choreographing fight scenes, writing, and directing many movies such as Hong Kong Godfather. He retired from the industry some time before 2009.

== Filmography ==
- Marco Polo AkA The Four Assassins (1975)
- Master of the Flying Guillotine (1976)
- Shaolin Temple (1976)
- Five Deadly Venoms (1978)
- The Avenging Eagle (1978)
- Crippled Avengers (1978)
- Vengeful Beauty (1978)
- Kid with the Golden Arm (1979)
- Dirty Ho (1979)
- Ten Tigers of Kwangtung (1979)
- Two on the Road (1980)
- Clan of the White Lotus (1980)
- Return to the 36th Chamber (1980)
- My Young Auntie (1981)
- Martial Club (1981)
- My Rebellious Son (1982)
- Health Warning (1982)
- Shaolin and Wu Tang (1983)
- Eight Diagram Pole Fighter (1984)
