= Shaolin and Wu Tang =

1983 Hong Kong film by Gordon Liu

- Theatrical poster
- Traditional Chinese: 少林與武當
- Simplified Chinese: 少林与武当
- Hanyu Pinyin: Shào Lín yǔ Wǔ Dāng
- Jyutping: Siu^{3} Lam^{4} jyu^{5} Mou^{5} Dong^{1}
- Directed by: Gordon Liu
- Written by: Huang Pa-ching; Katy Chin; Wong Chi-kien
- Produced by: Lau Kar-leung
- Starring: Gordon Liu; Adam Cheng; Idy Chan; Johnny Wang; Chan Shen; Kwan Hoi-san; Lee Hoi-sang; Elvis Tsui
- Cinematography: Chin Chiang Ma
- Edited by: Li Yen-Hai
- Music by: So Chung-shing; Shing Wai-yip
- Distributed by: Hing Fut Film Company
- Release date: 7 July 1983
- Running time: 87 minutes
- Country: Hong Kong
- Language: Cantonese
- Box office: HK$2,821,952

Shaolin and Wu Tang is a 1983 Hong Kong martial arts film directed by and starring Gordon Liu. The film is about the rivalry between the Shaolin (East Asian Mahayana) and Wu-Tang (Taoist Religion) martial arts schools. It is also called Shaolin vs. Wu-Tang in the Master Killer Collection.

== Plot summary ==
Master Liu and Master Law are rival masters of Shaolin style kung fu and Wu-Tang style sword fighting, running schools in the same city. Their top students, Chao Fung-wu and Hung Jun-kit, are actually close friends, with Jun-kit's sister, Yan-ling, having a crush on Fung-wu. After observing the two students fighting at a brothel, two of the local Qing Lord's soldiers report the power of the styles to him. The Lord determines that the two styles are dangerous and that he must learn both.

After being poisoned by the Lord, Master Law lets Fung-wu stab him. For this, Fung-wu is sent to prison. Attempting to rescue Fung-wu, Jun-kit teaches a prisoner the Shaolin Chin kang fist, not knowing the prisoner is the Lord's spy. After their escape from prison, the four of them (the spy, Yan-ling, Fung-wu and Jun-kit) are ambushed. To overcome the Lord's men, Fung-wu teaches the spy some Wu-Tang sword techniques. As they are still being overpowered, Fung-wu and Yan-ling have to flee the scene, only to be captured by the Wu-Tang who came to prosecute Fung-wu for killing Master Law. As they leave for Wu-Tang temple, Yan-ling gets shot and dies in Fung-wu arms. The Wu-Tang leave the dead body behind. Jun-kit finds it, believing the Wu-Tang killed his sister. Hoping to avenge Yan-ling's death, Jun-kit returns to the Shaolin temple for training as a monk. Meanwhile, Fung-wu is being held at the Wu-tang temple.

The Qing Lord has since learned both the styles from the spy, but because he did not learn either from a master, his grasp on both styles is imperfect. To overcome this deficiency, he decides to have the Wu-Tang and the Shaolin destroy each other so that he may be the only master of both styles. To do this, he stages a martial arts contest between the two temples, hoping to appeal to the traditional rivalry between the Shaolin and the Wu-Tang. Jun-kit (now called Tat-chi), and Fung-wu (now called Ming-kai), are selected by their respective temples as the representatives.

During the contest, the Qing Lord, in his impatience to see both Wu-Tang and Shaolin destroyed, admits his true motives and his role in Yan-ling and Master Law's deaths. Tat-chi and Ming-kai must then combine Shaolin Chin kang fist and Wu-Tang Sword style to defeat him.

== Cast ==
- Gordon Liu as Hung Jun-kit, later Tat-chi, Master Liu's top student
- Adam Cheng as Chao Fung-wu, later Ming-kai, Master Law's top student who is secret friends with Jun-kit
- Idy Chan as Yang-Lin, Jung-kit's sister who has a crush on Fung-wu
- Johnny Wang as the local Qing Lord who conspires against Master Liu and Master Law
- Li Ching as Yue Lam, the Qing Lord's spy learns the Shaolin and Wu-Tang styles from the Masters's disciples
- Chan Sen as a Shaolin abbot
- Han Chiang as Master Liu
- Kwan Hoi-san as Master Law, Master Liu's rival

== Legacy ==
East Coast hip-hop group Wu-Tang Clan has cited the film as an early inspiration. The film is one of Wu-Tang Clan founder RZA's favorite films of all time. Founders RZA and Ol' Dirty Bastard first saw the film in 1992 in a grindhouse cinema on Manhattan's 42nd Street and would found the group shortly after with GZA. The group would release its debut album Enter the Wu-Tang (36 Chambers), featuring samples from the film's English dub; the album's namesake is an amalgamation of Enter the Dragon (1973), Shaolin and Wu Tang, and The 36th Chamber of Shaolin (1978).

Rapper Logic sampled the film in his song "Wu Tang Forever" from his YSIV album, which featured all Wu-Tang members living at the time of its release.
