= Two on the Road =

1980 Hong Kong film by Lei Chiu

- Film poster
- Traditional Chinese: 識英雄重英雄
- Simplified Chinese: 识英雄重英雄
- Hanyu Pinyin: Shì Yīng Xióng Zhòng Yīng Xióng
- Jyutping: Sik1 Jing1 Hung4 Zung6 Jing1 Hung4
- Directed by: Lei Chiu
- Screenplay by: Sze-to On
- Produced by: Alex Gouw
- Starring: Bryan Leung; Philip Ko; Wang Lung-wei
- Cinematography: Chan Ho-yin
- Edited by: Fan Kung-wing
- Music by: Ng Tai-kong
- Production company: Goldig Films (HK)
- Release date: 6 November 1980
- Running time: 83 minutes
- Country: Hong Kong
- Language: Cantonese
- Box office: HK$912,068.50

Two on the Road, also known as Fearless Dragons and The Fearless Jackal, is a 1980 Hong Kong comedy-themed martial arts film. It was directed by Lei Chiu and starring Bryan Leung, Philip Ko and Wang Lung-wei.

The film is set during the era of the Republic of China (1912-1949). In the film, disaster relief funds are stolen during transportation. A wanted criminal and a con artist are wrongly jailed for the crime. The duo escapes, and decides to investigate who actually orchestrated the crime.

== Plot ==
During the early years of the Republic of China era, Ming On Town's mayor, Tse Hung (Wang Lung-wei), raises a large sum of funds for disaster victims of Guangdong with renowned martial arts master Wong and his disciples in charge of transporting the funds up north. However, while on the road, the funds were hijacked by robbers, causing disorderly chaos.

Lively Dragon (Bryan Leung), a conman, sees a wanted notice posted and reports it to the yamen. This reports leads police captain Yung and Master Wong to arrest wanted criminal Crazy Horse (Philip Ko). However, Horse managed to escape and as a result, Dragon was unable to collect any bounty. Dragon also becomes wanted with Horse. They are soon both captured and jailed.

Fortunately, the duo work together to escape from prison and became friends. Dragon and Horse later discover that someone set a trap causing them to become suspects for the stolen funds and the duo collaborates to investigate into the matter. Since then, a series of strange events occur in Ming On Town and Chow Po, the Tse family's housekeeper was killed when his wealth was made visible and Captain Yung was killed by the same culprit. Although Dragon and Horse's lives were in danger, they continued to investigate. Soon they discovered the secret that the funds were taken by an unexpected person. The duo decides to engage in a thrilling battle of wits and fists with the culprit to bring him to justice once and for all.

== Cast ==
- Bryan Leung as Lively Dragon (雷震天)
- Philip Ko as Crazy Horse (馬力)
- Wang Lung-wei as Tse Hung (謝雄)
- Leung Ka-lai as Master Wong (黃師傅)
- Siu Kam as Golden Teeth (大金牙)
- Chan Lau
- Addy Sung
- Chiang Tao
- Sai Gwa-Pau as Buckteeth So (牙擦蘇)
- Cheung Chok-chow
- Tsui Oi-sam
- Chow Shing-po
- Tsang Chiu-yue
- Liu Chui-yi as Female prisoner
- Chiu Sing-po
- Wong Hak
- Ho Pak-kwong
- Lai Kim-hung
- Chong Wai
- Chan Leung
- Lei Chiu
- Ho Kei-cheong
- Cheung Ping-chan
- To Wai-wo
- Lee Fat-yuen
- Chan Ling-wai
- Tai San

== Box office ==
The film grossed HK$912,068.50 at the Hong Kong box office during its theatrical run from 6 to 12 November 1980.
