= Wu-Tang Forever =

Studio album by Wu-Tang
- Released: June 3, 1997
- Recorded: July – October 1996
- Studios: 36 Chambers (New York); Ameraycan (North Hollywood)
- Genres: East Coast hip-hop; hardcore hip-hop; gangsta rap; alternative hip-hop
- Length: 112:07
- Labels: Loud; RCA
- Producers: RZA; Inspectah Deck; 4th Disciple; True Master; Tekitha

Wu-Tang chronology
Enter the Wu-Tang (36 Chambers) (1993)	Wu-Tang Forever (1997)	The W (2000)

Singles from Wu-Tang Forever
- 1. "Triumph" Released: January 11, 1997; 2. "It's Yourz" Released: September 23, 1997; 3. "Reunited" Released: November 24, 1997

Wu-Tang Forever is the second studio album by the American hip-hop group Wu-Tang Clan, released June 3, 1997, by Loud Records and RCA Records. Pressed as a double album, it was released after a long run of successful solo projects from various members of the group, and serves as the follow-up to their debut album Enter the Wu-Tang (36 Chambers). Forever features several guest appearances from Wu-Tang affiliates Cappadonna, Streetlife, 4th Disciple, True Master, and Tekitha. The original run of compact discs featured an enhanced CD which allowed users to walk around the "Wu Mansion" and access additional content.

== Music and lyrics ==
=== Production ===
While the group's previous album is known for its minimalistic production style, producer RZA had been expanding the musical backdrop of each solo Wu-Tang album since then. Raekwon's Only Built 4 Cuban Linx..., in particular, was praised for its cinematic feel. RZA earned accolades for his new dense style of production; incorporating strings, heavy synthesizers and samples of kung fu films. The production of the record also pioneered RZA's technique of chopping up and speeding up soul samples so that it becomes unusually high-pitched; this style of production—known as chipmunk soul—would later become influential on producers such as Just Blaze and Kanye West. Wu-Tang Forever marked the first group album in which RZA assigned some of the album's production to his protégés True Master and 4th Disciple, as well as Clan member Inspectah Deck.

=== Lyrical themes ===
The lyrics differed in many ways from those of 36 Chambers, with more verses written in stream-of-consciousness style, while being influenced by the teachings of the Five-Percent Nation. The Clan also took full advantage of the double-disc format, allowing each of the nine members a significant number of appearances, including four solo tracks: "The City" for Inspectah Deck, "Dog Shit" for Ol' Dirty Bastard, "Black Shampoo" for U-God and "Sunshower" for RZA.

Inspectah Deck raised his stock in the public eye with The Source's Hip-Hop Quotable for his performance on "Triumph". This verse is considered one of the greatest in hip-hop. Despite not having yet released a solo album, and not releasing one until October 1999, Deck's contributions throughout Wu-Tang Forever led to him being a sought-after collaborator for other artists in the wake of the album's release; during the 1998-1999 period he would make highly-regarded contributions to tracks on well-received albums from Gang Starr ("Above The Clouds" from Moment of Truth), Pete Rock ("Tru Master" from Soul Survivor) and Big Pun ("Tres Leches (Triboro Trilogy)" from Capital Punishment) among others. Ghostface Killah's verse in "Impossible" was also featured in The Source's Hip-Hop Quotable, and was later hailed by RZA in the Wu-Tang Manual as "the greatest Wu-Tang verse ever written".

"The sum of our parts is worth all the organizing," said Method Man. "It's like the Power Rangers where they come together to form that Megazord shit. Them guys are lethal but, when they come together, it's even more incredible. This album will destroy every hip-hop record made in the past ten years."

== Critical reception ==
Professional ratings
Review scores
Source	Rating
AllMusic	4/5 stars
Chicago Tribune	3/4 stars
Entertainment Weekly	A
The Guardian	5/5 stars
Los Angeles Times	3.5/4 stars
NME	8/10
Pitchfork	8.3/10
Rolling Stone	3.5/5 stars
Spin	7/10
USA Today	3.5/4 stars

Upon its release, Wu-Tang Forever received acclaim from music critics, who praised RZA's production work and the group members' lyricism. Matt Diehl from Entertainment Weekly commented, "Forever continues the group's artistic grand slam. Like their forebears in Public Enemy, Wu-Tang are musical revolutionaries, unafraid to bring the noise along with their trunk of funk. The RZA allows a few outside producers behind the board this time, but it's his gritty samples and numbing beats that get the party moving." Sasha Frere-Jones from Spin called it an album "for hip-hop junkies, rhyme followers who want to hear their favorite sword-swallowers drop unusually good styles over unusually good beats." Comparing some of the album's production to that of Wu-Tang member GZA's Liquid Swords (also produced by RZA), Neil Strauss from The New York Times wrote a favorable review of the album and stated "Wu-Tang Forever is a smooth, clean set of 25 songs and two speeches, with only a few throwaways on the second CD. The Wu-Tang Clan offers something for every kind of rap fan. More important, after a four-year wait, on Wu-Tang Forever the Clan retains its mantle as rap's standard bearers." Melody Maker gave Wu-Tang Forever a favorable review as well, stating "It had to be this big. It didn't have to be this good ... Every single track is a detonation of every single pop rule you thought sacrosanct ...Forever is one of the greatest hip hop LPs of all time." Stephen Thomas Erlewine from AllMusic stated:

Where contemporaries like 2Pac and The Notorious B.I.G. issued double-discs cluttered with filler, Wu-Tang Forever is purposeful and surprisingly lean, illustrating the immense depth of producer RZA and the entire nine-piece crew ... The result is an intoxicating display of musical and lyrical virtuosity, one that reveals how bereft of imagination the Wu-Tang's contemporaries are.

Describing the album's lyrics as "hauntingly descriptive tales of ghetto hustlers and victims," Rolling Stone's Nathan Brackett stated "The whole of Wu-Tang Forever crackles with a shootout-at-midnight electricity that more than justifies the double-disc indulgence, while the back-and-forth wordfire of Method Man, Raekwon, Ghostface Killah, etc. confirms the Clan's singular zing at the mic, and their ghetto-wise might as storytellers." Cheo Hodari Coker from the Los Angeles Times commented, "The Clan's beats push the limit between cutting-edge hip-hop and industrial feedback, with jugular-clutching rhymes following their own melodic dictates and insular messages running the gamut from ancient maxims of the art of war to spiritual knowledge, wisdom and understanding from the Islamic Five Percent Nation." Steve Jones from USA Today wrote, "Hip-hop's most anticipated album crackles with the nine-member clan's unique hard-core rhymes and beats. On this two-disc, 112-minute set, the whole is definitely greater than the sum of its parts. The RZA avoids overproduction, using the beats to propel the lyrics, and keeps the music free of clichéd R&B loops." Robert Christgau of The Village Voice gave the album a two-star honorable mention rating and called the Wu-Tang Clan "the five per cent nation of Oscar aspirations". In 2018, the BBC included it in their list of "the acclaimed albums that nobody listens to any more."

=== Accolades ===
Wu-Tang Forever was ranked as one of the best albums of the year by several notable publications, such as Spin, The Village Voice, NME, and Melody Maker. Popular Belgian magazine HUMO, and popular German magazine Spex both ranked it number six on their albums of the year lists. In 1999, Ego Trip ranked Wu-Tang Forever number three on their Hip Hop's 25 Greatest Albums by Year 1980–1998 list. In their March 2006 issue, Hip Hop Connection ranked the album number 57 on their 100 Greatest Rap Albums 1995–2005 list. Also in 2005, Blow Up magazine from Italy included Wu-Tang Forever in their 600 Essential Albums list. It also earned the group a Grammy Award nomination for Best Rap Album at the 40th Annual Grammy Awards.

== Commercial performance ==
The album was released the same month that a feud began between the group and influential New York hip hop radio station Hot 97. In the 2019 docuseries Wu-Tang Clan: Of Mics and Men, Inspectah Deck claimed that the group's music was blacklisted by Hot 97 after the group's performance at Hot 97's Summer Jam during which, due to a disagreement over scheduling, Ghostface Killah led the crowd in a chant of "Fuck Hot 97!" In 2023, Hot 97 DJ Funkmaster Flex publicly apologized to the group without specifically admitting that their music had been banned. A 2024 article on the Hot 97's website, however, explicitly conceded that the station had banned Wu-Tang. In a 2024 interview, RZA said he thought the album could have been certified Diamond if not for the ban.

Despite limited radio/TV airplay, and the nearly-six minute lead single "Triumph" which features no chorus, Wu-Tang Forever debuted at number one on the Billboard 200 with 612,000 copies sold in its first week. The album was certified 4× platinum by the Recording Industry Association of America (RIAA) on October 15, 1997 (each disc in the double album counted as separate unit for certification purpose), selling over 4 million copies in the United States. It is the group's highest selling album to date.

== Track listing ==
Track listing information is taken from the official liner notes and AllMusic. All tracks written by Wu-Tang Clan and produced by RZA, except where noted.

Wu-Tang Forever – Disc 1
No.	Title	Writer(s)	Performer(s)	Length
1.	"Wu-Revolution" (featuring Popa Wu and Uncle Pete)			6:46
2.	"Reunited"		GZA; Method Man; Ol' Dirty Bastard; RZA	5:21
3.	"For Heaven's Sake" (featuring Cappadonna)	Wu-Tang Clan; Darryl Hill	Inspectah Deck; Masta Killa	4:13
4.	"Cash Still Rules/Scary Hours (Still Don't Nothing Move but the Money)" (produced by 4th Disciple)	Wu-Tang Clan; Selwyn Bougard	Ghostface Killah; Method Man; Raekwon	3:01
5.	"Visionz" (produced by Inspectah Deck)		Ghostface Killah; Inspectah Deck; Masta Killa; Method Man; Raekwon	3:09
6.	"As High as Wu-Tang Get"		GZA; Method Man; Ol' Dirty Bastard	2:37
7.	"Severe Punishment"		GZA; Masta Killa; Raekwon; RZA; U-God	4:49
8.	"Older Gods" (produced by 4th Disciple)	Wu-Tang Clan; Bougard	Ghostface Killah; GZA; Raekwon	3:05
9.	"Maria" (featuring Cappadonna)	Wu-Tang Clan; Hill	Ol' Dirty Bastard; RZA	2:55
10.	"A Better Tomorrow" (produced by 4th Disciple)	Wu-Tang Clan; Bougard	Inspectah Deck; Masta Killa; Method Man; RZA; U-God	4:55
11.	"It's Yourz"		Ghostface Killah; Inspectah Deck; Raekwon; RZA; U-God	4:17
Total length:				44:58

Wu-Tang Forever – Disc 2
No.	Title	Writer(s)	Performer(s)	Length
1.	"Intro"		RZA	2:02
2.	"Triumph" (featuring Cappadonna)		Ghostface Killah; GZA; Inspectah Deck; Masta Killa; Method Man; Ol' Dirty Bastard; Raekwon; RZA; U-God	5:38
3.	"Impossible" ( featuring Tekitha); (produced by 4th Disciple and co-produced by RZA)	Wu-Tang Clan; Bougard	Ghostface Killah; Raekwon; RZA; Tekitha; U-God	4:28
4.	"Little Ghetto Boys" (featuring Cappadonna)	Wu-Tang Clan; Hill; Earl DeRouen; Edward Howard	Raekwon	4:49
5.	"Deadly Melody" (featuring Street Life)		Ghostface Killah; Masta Killa; GZA; Method Man; RZA; U-God	4:20
6.	"The City" (produced by 4th Disciple)	Wu-Tang Clan; Bougard	Inspectah Deck	4:05
7.	"The Projects"		Ghostface Killah; Method Man; Raekwon	3:18
8.	"Bells of War"		Ghostface Killah; Masta Killa; Method Man; RZA; U-God	5:12
9.	"The M.G.M." (produced by True Master)	Wu-Tang Clan; Derrick Harris	Ghostface Killah; Raekwon	2:38
10.	"Dog Shit"		Ol' Dirty Bastard	3:34
11.	"Duck Seazon"		Method Man; Raekwon; RZA	5:42
12.	"Hellz Wind Staff" (featuring Street Life)		Ghostface Killah; Inspectah Deck; Method Man; Raekwon; RZA	4:52
13.	"Heaterz" ( featuring Cappadonna); (produced by True Master)	Wu-Tang Clan; Hill; Harris	Inspectah Deck; Ol' Dirty Bastard; Raekwon; U-God	5:26
14.	"Black Shampoo"		U-God	3:50
15.	"Second Coming" (featuring Tekitha)	Wu-Tang Clan; Jimmy Webb		4:38
16.	"The Closing"		Raekwon	2:37
Total length:				67:09

Notes

- "Wu-Revolution" contains uncredited backing vocals by Blue Raspberry.
- "Reunited" contains backing vocals by Roxanne.
- "Projects" contains uncredited vocals by Shyheim.
- "Black Shampoo" contains uncredited vocals by P.R. Terrorist and Tekitha.

Sample list

- "For Heavens Sake" contains a sample of "Don't Leave Me Lonely" by King Floyd.
- "Cash Still Rules/Scary Hours (Still Don't Nothing Move But the Money)" contains a sample of "The End of the World" by Skeeter Davis.
- "Severe Punishment" contains dialogue from The Master.
- "A Better Tomorrow" contains a sample of "The Love Theme" by Peter Nero.
- "It's Yourz" contains a sample of "It's Yours" by T La Rock & Jazzy Jay.
- "Little Ghetto Boy" contains a sample of "Little Ghetto Boy" by Donny Hathaway.
- "The City" contains a sample of "Living for the City" by Stevie Wonder.
- "The Projects" contains a sample of "Cry Together" by The O'Jays.
- "Hellz Wind Staff" contains dialogue from Unbeaten 28.
- "Second Coming" contains an interpolation of "MacArthur Park" by Jimmy Webb.

== Personnel ==
- RZA – performer, producer, engineer, mixing, executive producer
- GZA – performer
- Ol' Dirty Bastard – performer
- Method Man – performer
- Raekwon – performer
- Ghostface Killah – performer, executive producer
- Inspectah Deck – performer, producer, mixing
- U-God – performer
- Masta Killa – performer
- Cappadonna – performer
- Street Life – performer
- Tekitha – vocals
- Popa Wu – vocals
- Diva Gray – background vocals
- Robin Clark – background vocals
- Uncle Pete – vocals
- Fourth Disciple – producer, engineer, mixing
- True Master – producer, engineer, mixing
- Mitchell Diggs – executive producer
- Oli Grant – executive producer
- Divine – production coordination
- P.O.W.E.R. – production coordination
- Ney Pimentel – Creative direction, album artwork, photography, design and layout
- Carlos Bess – drums, mixing, mixing engineer
- Ramsey Jones – drums
- Scott Harding – mixing, mixing engineer
- Michael Reaves – mixing
- Troy Staton – mixing
- Tom Coyne – mastering
- Eugene Nastasi – editing
- Ola Kudu – Creative direction, album artwork, design and layout
- Carlo Spicola – animation, VR and Enhanced CD content producer
- Sherin Baday – photography
- Bob Berg – photography
- Philippe McClelland – photography
- Shawn Mortenson – photography

== Charts ==
=== Weekly charts ===
Weekly chart performance for Wu-Tang Forever
Chart (1997)	Peak position
Australian Albums (ARIA)	8
Austrian Albums (Ö3 Austria)	17
Belgian Albums (Ultratop Flanders)	23
Belgian Albums (Ultratop Flanders)	36
Canadian Albums (Billboard)	1
Dutch Albums (Album Top 100)	9
Finnish Albums (Suomen virallinen lista)	11
French Albums (SNEP)	8
German Albums (Offizielle Top 100)	8
New Zealand Albums (RMNZ)	1
Norwegian Albums (VG-lista)	6
Scottish Albums (Official Charts)	7
Swedish Albums (Sverigetopplistan)	2
Swiss Albums (Schweizer Hitparade)	11
UK Albums (Official Charts)	1
US Billboard 200	1
US Top R&B/Hip-Hop Albums (Billboard)	1

=== Year-end charts ===
1997 year-end chart performance for Wu-Tang Forever
Chart (1997)	Position
German Albums Offizielle Top 100)	69
US Billboard 200	30
US Top R&B/Hip-Hop Albums (Billboard)	9

== Certifications ==
Certifications for Wu-Tang Forever
Region	Certification	Certified units/sales
Canada (Music Canada)	2× Platinum	200,000^{^}
United Kingdom (BPI)	Gold	100,000^{^}
United States (RIAA)	4× Platinum	2,000,000^{^}
^{^} Shipments figures based on certification alone.

== See also ==
- List of Billboard 200 number-one albums of 1997
- List of Billboard number-one R&B albums of 1997
- Wu-Tang Forever (song)
