= Ten Tigers from Kwangtung =

1980 Hong Kong film by Chang Cheh

- Film poster
- Directed by: Chang Cheh; Leung Ting (Action Director)
- Written by: Chang Cheh; Ni Kuang
- Produced by: Mona Fong
- Starring: Ti Lung; Fu Sheng; Philip Kwok
- Cinematography: Cho Wai Kei
- Edited by: Chiang Hsing Lung; Lee Yim Hoi
- Music by: Eddie H. Wang
- Distributed by: Shaw Brothers Studio
- Release date: 25 December 1980 (Hong Kong)
- Running time: 91 minutes
- Country: Hong Kong
- Language: Cantonese

Ten Tigers from Kwangtung (Chinese: 廣東十虎與後五虎; pinyin: Guǎngdōng Shí Hǔ yǔ hòu Wǔ Hǔ) is a 1980 Hong Kong martial arts film directed by Chang Cheh and produced by Mona Fong. It is one of Chang Cheh's tales of Shaolin's historic rivalries with the Qing dynasty and the Canton Tigers. Along with the Brave Archer series, Ten Tigers had an all-star cast of Shaw martial artists.

== Plot ==
The movie involves two stories concerning the original Ten Tigers and their future disciples. The film opens with Tung Chi (Wang Li) and his nephew, Liang Seo Hu, pursuing the disciples to take revenge for General Liang, who was the father of Liang Seo Hu, and who was also Tung Chi's martial arts brother. After killing one of the disciples, Wang Chow Ming (Lung Tung Sheng) and Lin Fu Sheng (Chin Siu-Ho) tells the story of the original Ten Tigers.

Anti-Ch'ing revolutionary leader Chai Min Yu (Ku Feng) is being hunted down by Manchu General Liang (Wang Lung Wei). He is almost caught when a masked man rescues him from death and escapes with him. The masked man is Li Jen Chiao (Ti Lung) a loyal ex-Shaolin man and the owner of a pawn shop in town. Li Jen Chiao hides Chai Min Yu in the back of his pawn shop, and sends his younger brother Tan Ming (Fu Sheng) to seek the help of two other ex-Shaolin men who reside in the town, Wan Yi Ling (Sun Chien) and Su He Hu (Lu Feng). Tan Ming is temperamental and is always getting into fights, and he starts fighting with Wan Yi Ling and Su He Hu before he explains the reason for his visit. Luckily, Li Jen Chiao is able to explain the situation in time, and the two man gladly swear their allegiance. They are also joined by loyal Shaolin brothers Wong Yin Lin (Wei Pai) and Wong Kei Ying. Beggar Su Chan (Kuo Chui), Iron-finger Chung (Lo Mang), Chu Yu Sheng (Chiang Sheng), Tieh Chow Tsan also join in the fray to assist the revolutionary in escaping and killing General Liang

In the present, an older Su Chan and Su He Hu plan a counterattack to kill Tung Chi, his brother Tung Pa, and their nephew before they can kill the remaining Ten Tigers.

== Cast ==
- Ti Lung – Li Jen Chiao
- Fu Sheng – Tang Ming
- Wei Pai - Wang Chi Ying
- Dick Wei - Wang Cheng Ke
- Sun Chien - Wan Yi Ling
- Lu Feng – Su He Hu
- Philip Kwok – Beggar Su
- Yeung Hung - Tieh Chow San
- Chiang Sheng - Tzou Yu Sheng
- Lo Mang – Iron finger Chung
- Ku Feng – Chai Min Yu
- Chin Siu-ho - Lin Fu Sheng
- Lung Tung Sheng – Wang Chow Ming
- Wang Lung-wei – General Liang
- Wang Li – Tung Chi
