= Legend of the Dragon (film) =

1991 Hong Kong film by Danny Lee

- Poster
- Traditional Chinese: 龍的傳人
- Simplified Chinese: 龙的传人
- Hanyu Pinyin: Lóng De Chuán Rén
- Jyutping: Lung4 Dik1 Cyun4 Jan4
- Directed by: Danny Lee
- Screenplay by: Law Kam-fai
- Story by: James Fung
- Produced by: Danny Lee
- Starring: Stephen Chow; Teresa Mo; Bryan Leung; Yuen Wah
- Cinematography: Abdul M. Rumjahn; Andrew Lau; Tony Miu
- Edited by: Ma Chung-yiu
- Music by: Philip Chan; Tang Siu-lam
- Production company: Magnum Films
- Distributed by: Golden Princess Amusement
- Release date: 7 March 1991
- Running time: 96 minutes
- Country: Hong Kong
- Languages: Cantonese; English
- Box office: HK$23,762,012

Legend of the Dragon is a 1990 Hong Kong action-comedy film directed by Danny Lee, starring Stephen Chow, Teresa Mo, Bryan Leung and Yuen Wah.

== Plot ==
Chow plays a naive young kung fu student, who leaves his rural home on a small island to find his fortune in Hong Kong under the dubious guidance of his uncle (Bryan Leung), who cons him into using his natural skills as a snooker player for the uncle's financial gain. The film also stars real world six-time world snooker finalist Jimmy White as Chow's final opponent.

== Cast ==
- Stephen Chow as Chow Siu-lung
- Teresa Mo as Mo
- Bryan Leung as Yun
- Yuen Wah as Master Chow Fei-hung
- Corey Yuen as Cop
- Lung Fong as Boss Fong
- Shing Fui-On as Fong's hood with Glasses
- Felix Lok as Fong's realtor
- Chiu Chi-ling as man in crowd at festival
- Hoi Sang Lee as Blind Temple Keeper
- Jimmy White as himself, the World Snooker Champion
- Parkman Wong (Cameo appearance)
- Ricky Yi as Hood
- Amy Yip as Boutique boss (Cameo appearance)
