= Ten Tigers of Canton =

Chinese martial artist group

- Traditional Chinese: 廣東十虎
- Simplified Chinese: 广东十虎
Transcriptions
Standard Mandarin
- Hanyu Pinyin: Guǎngdōng Shí Hǔ
- Wade–Giles: Kuang-tung Shih Hu
- Yale Romanization: Gwǎngdōng Shŕ Hǔ
- IPA: [kwàŋtʊ́ŋ ʂɻ̩̌ xù]
Yue: Cantonese
- Yale Romanization: Gwóngdūng Sahp Fú
- Jyutping: Gwong^{2}dung^{1} Sap^{6} Fu^{2}
- IPA: [kʷɔ̌ːŋ tʊːŋ sɐ̀p fǔː]

Ten Tigers of Canton or Ten Tigers of Guangdong refers to a group of ten Chinese martial artists from Guangdong Province who lived around the 19th century during the Qing dynasty in China. They were said to be the greatest fighters in Guangdong during the Qing era. Much of their existence has been embellished by folk legends and stories passed down from generation to generation.

== Ten Tigers' martial arts ==
The Ten Tigers of Canton traced their martial arts lineage to the Southern Shaolin Monastery 南少林寺 in the Jiulian Mountains 九連山 in Fujian Province 福建省. Southern Shaolin Kung Fu is a branch of the better known Shaolin Monastery 少林寺 on Mount Song 嵩山 in Henan Province 河南省. As such, the Ten Tigers' martial arts styles resemble those of Shaolin Kung Fu 少林武功.

== Ten Tigers of Canton ==
=== Wong Yan-lam ===
Wong Yan-lam or Wang Yinlin (王隐林; 王隱林; Wáng Yǐnlín; Wong^{4} Jan^{2}-lam^{4}), also romanised as Wong Yein-lam, was a student of the Tibetan monk Xinglong (星龍), a master of the "Lion's Roar" (獅子吼) style of martial arts. Wong mastered this style, which later split into the Hop Family Fist (俠家拳; Xiájiā quán; Haap^{6}gaa^{1} kyun^{4}), Lama Style (喇嘛派), and White Crane Fist (Tibetan White Crane 西藏白鶴拳).

=== Wong Ching-ho ===
Wong Ching-ho or Huang Chengke (黄澄可; 黃澄可; Huáng Chéngkě; Wong^{4} Cing^{4}-ho^{2}), also romanised as Wong Cheng-ho, was a student of Luk Ah-choi (Chinese: 陸阿采; pinyin: Lù Acǎi). He is portrayed in popular fiction as specialising in the Nine Dragons Fist (九龍拳).

=== So Hak-fu ===
So Hak-fu or Su Heihu (苏黑虎; 蘇黑虎; Sū Hēihǔ; Sou^{1} Hak^{1}-fu^{2}), also romanised as Sou Hark-fu, was a student of the Shaolin monk Zhaode 少林僧人兆德. He was trained in the Southern Shaolin Style (南少林派) but later created his own style, which is known as Black Tiger Style (黑虎門).

=== Wong Kei-ying ===
Wong Kei-ying or Huang Qiying (黄麒英; 黃麒英; Huáng Qíyīng; Wong^{4} Kei^{4}-jing^{1}), also romanised as Wong Khei-yin, was a student of Luk Ah-choi. He is best known for his skill in Hung Ga (洪家)of which he was one of the progenitors. He also was the father of Wong Fei-hung 黃飛鴻, who wasn't one of the Ten Tigers but is sometimes referred to as the Tiger after the Ten Tigers.

=== Lai Yan-chiu ===
Lai Yan-chiu or Li Renchao (黎仁超; Lí Rénchāo; Lai^{4} Jan^{4}-ciu^{1}) was a practitioner of the Hakka Fist (客家拳), which was also known as Southern Praying Mantis (南螳螂). He was also known for his skill in the Seven Stars Fist (七星拳).

=== So Chan ===
So Chan or Su Can (苏灿; 蘇燦; Sū Càn; Sou^{1} Can^{3}) was a Hung Ga (洪家) practitioner. He was famous for his skill in Drunken Fist (醉拳) and Shaolin Staff (少林棍). He is more commonly known by his nickname "So Hut-yee" or "Su Qi'er" (苏乞儿; 蘇乞兒; Sū Qǐ'er; Sou^{1} Hat^{1}-ji^{4}), which means "Beggar So". Like Wong Fei-hung 黃飛鴻, he is also regarded as a folk hero in Chinese popular culture and has been the subject of films such as King of Beggars (1992) and True Legend (2010). He also appeared as a supporting character in some movies about Wong Fei-hung, most notably Drunken Master (1978).

=== Leung Kwan ===
Leung Kwan or Liang Kun (梁坤; Liáng Kūn; Loeng^{4} Kwan^{1}) was primarily known as one of the progenitors of Hung Ga (洪家) but practiced the uncategorized southern shaolin style. He was known for his skill in the Iron Wire Fist (鐵線拳). He is more commonly known by his nickname "Iron Bridge Three" (铁桥三; 鐵橋三; Tiě Qiáo Sān; Tit^{3} Kiu^{4} Saam^{1}) because of the extraordinary strength he acquired through the practice of the iron wire fist.

=== Chan Cheung-tai ===
Chan Cheung-tai or Chen Changtai (陈长泰; 陳長泰; Chén Chángtài; Can^{4} Coeng^{4}-taai^{3}) specialised in the martial art Iron Finger (鐵指). He was nicknamed "Iron Finger Chan" (铁指陈; 鐵指陳; Tiě Zhǐ Chén; Tit^{3} Zi^{2} Can^{2}).

=== Tam Chai-kwan ===
Tam Chai-kwan or Tan Jijun (谭济筠; 譚濟筠; Tán Jìjūn; Taam^{4} Zai^{3}-gwan^{1}) was a practitioner of the Huadu 花都省 style of Hung Ga 洪家拳 and Tam Ga (譚家). He was nicknamed "Three Legs Tam" (三脚谭; 三腳譚; Sān Jiǎo Tán; Saam^{1} Goek^{3} Taam^{4}) for the three types of kicks he used.

=== Chau Tai ===
Chau Tai or Zhou Tai (周泰; Zhōu Tài; Zau^{1} Taai^{3}), also romanised as Jau Taai and Chow Thye, was known for his "soft-hand" techniques and his mastery of the long staff. He created the martial art Zhou Family Bagua Staff (周家八卦棍), who has been passed down for generations in his family. He was also a master of Choy Li Fut 蔡李佛, which he integrated into his other martial arts styles. His descendants, Hung Chau (great-grandson) and Michael Chau (great-great-grandson), reside in San Francisco, California, United States.

== Cultural references ==
=== Film ===
The Ten Tigers first appeared in the 1978 film Ten Tigers of Shaolin (廣東十虎) produced by Mei Lam Film Production Company.

The Ten Tigers appeared in the 1979 Hong Kong film Ten Tigers from Kwangtung (廣東十虎與後五虎) produced by the Shaw Brothers Studio. It featured a star-studded cast of Shaw Studio actors, including the Venom Mob, Ti Lung and Alexander Fu.

A fictionalized version of the Ten Tigers were featured in the 2004 film Around the World in 80 Days, with Sammo Hung making a special appearance as Wong Fei-hung. Wong and the Ten Tigers assisted the protagonists in liberating the village of Lanzhou.

=== Television ===
In 1999, Hong Kong's ATV produced a 40-episodes TV drama series titled Ten Tigers of Guangdong (英雄之廣東十虎).

=== Literature ===
In The Eleventh Tiger, a BBC Books original novel set in the Doctor Who universe by David A. McIntee, the Ten Tigers are featured, with Wong Kei-ying and Wong Fei-hung as major characters in the story.

=== Music ===
The electronic music artist Bonobo has a track called "Ten Tigers" on his 2013 album The North Borders.
