= Leung Kwan =

Chinese martial artist

- Born: 1815; Guangdong
- Died: 1887 (aged 71–72); Guangdong
- Style: Chinese martial arts Hung Ga
- Teacher(s): Li Huzi; Yuanguang

Other information
- Occupation: Martial artist

Leung Kwan (Chinese: 梁坤; pinyin: Liáng Kūn; 1815–1887), popularly nicknamed "Iron Bridge Three" or "Tit Kiu Sam", was known as 'the great master of the Hong Fist' and was one of the Ten Tigers of Canton, a group of ten of the top Chinese martial arts masters in Guangdong towards the end of the Qing Dynasty (1644–1912).

== Biography ==
Born in 1815, Leung studied martial arts in his youth under the famous Shaolin master Li Huzi (Bearded Li, also known as "Golden Hook"). He loved studying martial techniques, and travelled around in search of friends and great masters, frequently seeking out the company of Buddhist monks. Dedicated training in Shaolin techniques helped him to develop a solid foundation. He went on to teach martial arts at the Guangzhi dye-works at Rainbow Bridge in Canton (now known as Guangzhou) and he became an extremely well known figure.

Leung was born during the reign of the Jiaqing Emperor (1796–1821), and died in the 12th or 13th year of the reign of the Guangxu Emperor (1887 or 1888). His death was caused by over-zealous training in the "36 Point Copper Ring Pole" technique, under the monk Yuanguang at Hoi Tong Monastery. Leung had long been an opium smoker; the monk advised him to break the habit and train in the pole technique instead. But he pushed himself too hard for his age, fell ill and died around the age of 70.

Leung is best known for his "Iron Bridges" and the fist form Iron Wire Fist. His Iron Wire Fist is the highest level in most Hung Ga schools and his work is very important to the current Hung Ga system.
