= Zha (surname) =

Zha (查)
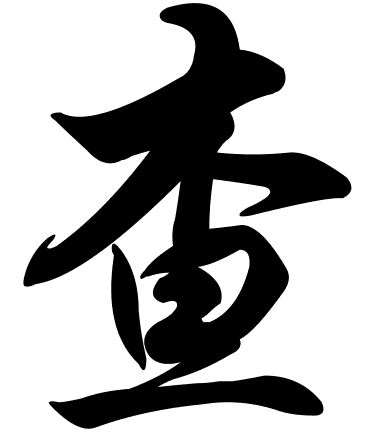
- Pronunciation: Zhā (Mandarin)
- Language: Chinese

Origin
- Language: Old Chinese
- Origin: Jiāng (surname 姜)

Other names
- Variant form: Cha

Zha is the Mandarin pinyin romanization of the Chinese surname written 查 in Chinese character. It is romanized as Cha in Wade–Giles. Zha is listed 397th in the Song dynasty classic text Hundred Family Surnames. As of 2008, it is the 176th most common surname in China, shared by 680,000 people. It was originated as a branch of the Jiang (姜) surname. Zha was originally the name of a district in modern-day Shandong province.

== Notable people ==
- Zha Jizuo (1601–1676), Ming and Qing dynasty scholar
- Zha Shibiao (1615–1698), Ming and Qing dynasty landscape painter
- Zha Sheng (查昇; 1650–1707), Qing dynasty calligrapher
- Zha Shenxing (1650–1727), Qing dynasty poet
- Zha Sili (查嗣瑮; 1652–1733), Qing dynasty scholar, brother of Zha Shenxing
- Zha Siting (查嗣庭; died 1727), Qing dynasty scholar-official, victim of the literary Inquisition, brother of Zha Shenxing
- Zha Weiren (查为仁; 1695–1749), Qing dynasty poet
- Zha Kui (查揆; 1770–1834), Qing dynasty poet
- Zha Fuxi (1895–1976), guqin player and scholar, aviator
- Zha Qian (查谦; 1896–1975), physicist, first president of Huazhong University of Science and Technology
- Cha Liang-chao (1897–1982), Republic of China educator
- Cha Liang-chien (查良鑑; 1904–1994), Republic of China Minister of Justice, brother of Cha Liang-chao
- Cha Chi Ming (1914–2007), entrepreneur and philanthropist
- Mu Dan or Zha Liangzheng (1918–1977), poet
- Louis Cha Leung-yung or Zha Liangyong, Jin Yong (zh:查良鏞; 1924–2018), wuxia novelist with over 100 million copies of his works sold worldwide
- Zha Quanxing (1925–2019), chemist, member of the Chinese Academy of Sciences, son of Zha Qian
- Cha Mou Sing (查懋聲; 1943–2020), chairman of HKR International, son of Cha Chi Ming
- Zha Peixin (查培新; born 1946), Chinese ambassador to Canada and the United Kingdom
- Laura Cha (查史美倫, born 1949, original name Shih May-lung), Hong Kong businesswoman and politician, wife of Cha Mou Zing
- Cha Mou Zing (born 1950), vice-chairman of HKR International, son of Cha Chi Ming
- Zha Jianguo (查建国; born 1953), dissident, cofounder of the Democracy Party of China
- Cha Chuen Yee (查傳誼; born 1956), Hong Kong film director and producer
- Zha Jianying (born 1959), Chinese-American journalist and writer
- Hai Zi or Zha Haisheng (1964–1989), poet
- Zha Jie (born 1994), actor and model

== Fictional characters ==
- Kate Cha/Dupli-Kate, an Image Universe superhero in the comic and television series Invincible
- Paul Cha/Multi-Paul, an Image Universe supervillain in the comic and television series Invincible
