= Ode to Gallantry (disambiguation) =

Ode to Gallantry may refer to:

- Ode to Gallantry, known as Xia Ke Xing (or Xiake Xing) in Mandarin or Hap Hak Hang in Cantonese, is a novel by Jin Yong. Xia Ke Xing is also the title of a poem by Tang Dynasty poet Li Bai.
- Adaptations of the novel:
  - Ode to Gallantry (film), a 1982 Hong Kong film
  - Ode to Gallantry (1985 TV series), a 1985 Taiwanese television series
  - Ode to Gallantry (1989 TV series), a 1989 Hong Kong television series
  - Ode to Gallantry (2002 TV series), a 2002 Chinese television series
