= Bruno Juričić =

Croatian architect

- Born: 1977 (age 48–49); Pula, SR Croatia, SFR Yugoslavia
- Education: Iuav University of Venice
- Occupation: Architect
- Buildings: Xia Ke Hotel in Haining

Bruno Juričić (born in 1977) is a Croatian architect. He represented Croatia at the 2018 Venice Biennale. In 2018, Juričić won a €100 million tender for the Xia Ke complex in Haining, China, becoming the first Croatian in history to win an international tender of this size with his own project.

== Biography ==
Juričić was born in 1977 in Pula, Croatia. He has a master's degree in urban planning. Juričić graduated from the Iuav University of Venice, and got his MSc with excellence from the University of Applied Arts of Vienna.

He represented Croatia at the 2018 Venice Biennale, presenting Croatia's “Cloud Pergola / The Architecture of Hospitality”, which at the time was said to be one of the world's largest and most complex 3D-fabricated structures.

In 2018, he became the author of a €100 million leisure complex in Haining, China. The entire complex covers 200,000 m2, and the hotel complex about 35,000 m2, with a cultural centre dedicated to Haining native writer Jin Yong. Yong inspired the construction of the complex, which is informed by wuxia. Xia Ke means "ode to gallantry" in Chinese, and is the title of one of Yang's most famous works, a "much-filmed martial arts epic" that bears some resemblance to Shakespeare's Twelfth Night. Juričić is the first Croatian architect to win a tender of these proportions with his own project.

He currently lives between Pula and Shanghai.
