= Ode to Gallantry (2017 TV series) =

2017 Chinese TV series

- DVD cover art
- 新侠客行
- Genre: Wuxia
- Based on: Ode to Gallantry by Jin Yong
- Directed by: Zhang Jizhong
- Starring: Cai Yida; Jenny Zhang; Lisa Li
- Opening theme: "Ode to Gallantry" (侠客行) by Shang Wenjie
- Ending theme: "Jianghu Friendship" (江湖友情) by Shang Wenjie
- Country of origin: China
- Original language: Mandarin
- No. of episodes: 32

Production
- Production location: China
- Running time: ≈45 minutes per episode

Original release
- Network: A&B Film Enterprises Limited
- Release: 7 July – 18 July 2017

Ode to Gallantry (新侠客行) is a 2017 Chinese wuxia television series adapted from the novel of the same title by Jin Yong. It starred Cai Yida and Jenny Zhang in the lead roles. Directed by Zhang Jizhong, the series was first broadcast globally by A&B Film Enterprises Limited and LiTV Taiwan simultaneously.

== Cast ==
- Cai Yida as Shi Potian / Shi Zhongyu
- Jenny Zhang as Ding Dang
- Wang Zi as Shi Jian
- Canti Lau as Shi Qing
- He Jiayi as Min Rou
- Lisa Li as Axiu
- Waise Lee as Bei Haishi
- Kent Tong as Bai Zizai
- Ling Ma as Shi Xiaocui
- Berg Ng as Ding Busi
- Ba Duo as Ding Busan
- Norman Chui as Xie Yanke
- Ricky Chan as Bai Wanjian
- Shan Lianli as Hua Wanzi
- An Qi'er as Feng Wanli
- Gao Shan as Zhan Fei
- Wang Lan as Hua Wanzi
- Wang Jiangguo as Island Master Long
- Zhao Guixiang as Island Master Mu
- Zheng Wensen as Zhang San
- Xu Zhanwei as Li Si

== See also ==
- Ode to Gallantry (film)
- Ode to Gallantry (1985 TV series)
- Ode to Gallantry (1989 TV series)
- Ode to Gallantry (2002 TV series)
