= Ode to Gallantry (2002 TV series) =

2002 Chinese TV series

- DVD cover art
- 侠客行
- Genre: Wuxia
- Based on: Ode to Gallantry by Jin Yong
- Screenplay by: Gui Yuqing; Li Yue
- Directed by: Wang Xinmin
- Starring: Wu Jian; Zhou Li; Zhang Yanmin
- Country of origin: China
- Original language: Mandarin
- No. of episodes: 40

Production
- Producers: Xiao Gang; Liu Rui
- Production location: China
- Running time: ≈45 minutes per episode
- Production company: NMTV

Original release
- Network: NMTV
- Release: 1 January 2002 – 2002

Ode to Gallantry (侠客行) is a Chinese wuxia television series adapted from the novel of the same title by Jin Yong. The series was first broadcast on NMTV in China in 2002.

== Cast ==
- Wu Jian as Shi Potian / Shi Zhongyu
- Zhou Li as Ding Dang
- Deng Jiajia as Shi Jian
- Ji Qilin as Shi Qing
- Han Yueqiao as Min Rou
- Zhang Yanmin as Axiu
- Tong Youxun as Bei Haishi
- Zhang Guangzheng as Bai Zizai
- Li Xiaobo as Ding Busi
- Su Tingshi as Ding Busan
- Ba Tu as Xie Yanke
- Guo Jun as Bai Wanjian
- Shan Lianli as Hua Wanzi
- Zhang Shan as Feng Wanli
- Wu Mengjiang as Chen Chongzhi
- Li Zhonglin as Mi Hengye
- Fan Yanhua as Shi Popo
- Tan Jianchang as Zhan Fei
- Li Zongqiang as Qiu Shanfeng
- Bu He as Master Bu
- Hua Zi as Gui
- Jia Zhaoji as Chong
- Tong Xiaohu as Zhang San
  - Sun Yantong as Zhang San (younger)
- Kong Qingsan as Li Si
- Yang Xin as Huanhuan Lele
- Ma Junle as Mei Fanggu
- Li Yunjuan Gao Sanniangzi
- Heilong as Fengliang
- Cao Tuxin as Fan Yifei
- Li Baowei as Lü Zhengping
- Shao Wanlin as Island Master Long
- Shu Yaoxuan as Island Master Mu
- Wang Delong as Laojintian
- Wang Limin as Xiaojintian
- Wu Jiayi as Tianxu / Liu Yishou
- Xu Ming as Chongxu
- Zeng Yuanyuan as Xiaoyu
- Liu Lu as Gouzazhong
- Guo Zi as Jianzi Bangzhu
- Sun Ning as Li Jiecheng
- Li Ming as Bull-head
- Liu Bin as Horse-face
- Sang Lin as Sun Wannian
- Huang Jingyi as Liao Zili
- Sheng Ning as Geng Wanzhong
- Xu Jiuru as Qi Zimian
- Zhang Fengming as Cheng Lixue
- Zhao Xiaoqi as Liang Ziqin
- Chen Qitai as Wu Daotong
- Ma Hong as Zhou Mu
- Guo Zhu as Ma Cheng
- Tian Min as Zhan's wife
- Yuan Hongqi as Dabei Old Man
- Wang Fang as Kexin

== See also ==
- Ode to Gallantry (film)
- Ode to Gallantry (1985 TV series)
- Ode to Gallantry (1989 TV series)
- Ode to Gallantry (2017 TV series)
