= Yuenü =

Legendary Chinese swordswoman

Yuenü (Chinese: 越女; pinyin: Yuènǚ; Wade–Giles: Yüeh-nü; lit. 'the Lady of Yue') was a swordswoman from the state of Yue, in the modern Chinese province of Zhejiang. She is also known as Maiden of the Southern Forest. She was author of the earliest-known exposition on swordplay.

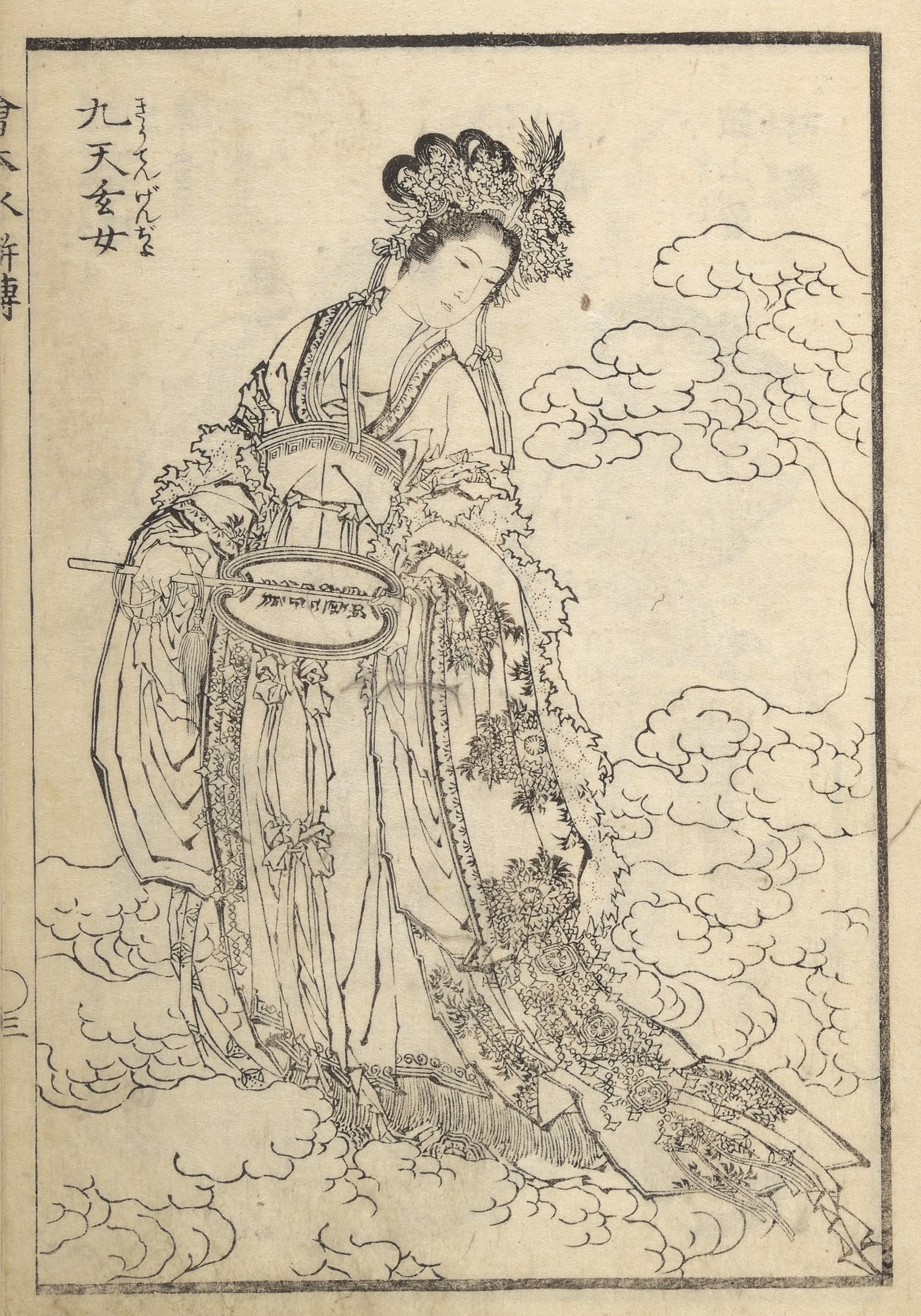
Jiutian Xuannü as depicted in a 1829 Japanese picture book of the Water Margin she is a goddess of swords

== Life and legacy ==
Yuenü lived during the reign of Goujian of Yue (496-465 BCE). From a young age, she learned archery and how to use a sword by hunting with her father. The King of Yue planned to attack the state of Wu and when he heard about her skills, he invited her to court. Along the way, she was challenged by an old man who was in reality a magic white Interconnected-arm gibbon ape:

The Young Woman of Yue travelled north for her audience with the king. On the way, she met an old fellow who said his name was “Old Mr. Yuan” [Yuan Gong, 袁公].

He said to the young woman, “I hear you fight well with a [sword]. I’d like to see a demonstration.”

She replied, “I wouldn’t presume to keep anything from you: you are welcome to test my skill, Sir.”

So Old Man Yuan drew out a length of Linyu bamboo. But the bamboo was rotten at one end. The end fell to the ground and the young woman immediately snatched it up. The old man wielded the top end of the staff and thrust towards the young woman, but [she] parried straight back, thrust three times, and finally raised her end of bamboo and drove home her attack against Old Man Yuan [fig. 10]. Old Man Yuan hopped off up a tree, turning into a white ape [baiyuan, 白猿, hence the surname]. Then each went their own way, and she went on to meet with the king.

Upon meeting the king, the Maiden reveals the secret to her fighting ability is the application of yin and yang energy, which are metaphorically described as the opening and closing of large and small swinging doors. Furthermore, she claims that, while strengthening the spirit, one should remain outwardly calm.

Her exposition on the art of the sword impressed the king, who decreed that her skills be used to train his army and gave her the title 'the Yue Woman' (越女) or Lady of Yue. The king appointed her to train his army officers, who in turn, instructed his army.

Hers is the earliest known exposition on the art of the sword and influenced Chinese martial arts for generations.

During the Warring States period, the Baiyue people were known for their swordsmanship and for producing fine swords. According to the Spring and Autumn Annals of Wu and Yue, King Goujian met a female sword fighter called Nanlin (Yuenü) who demonstrated mastery over the art. So he commanded his top five commanders to study her technique. Ever since the method came to be known as the "Sword of the Lady of Yue". The Yue were also thought to have possessed mystical knives embued with the talismanic power of dragons or other amphibious creatures.

Yuan Gong — A reincarnation of a monkey who has mastered and learned Tongbeiquan and is a follower of Taoism. He became a disciple of Jiutian Xuannu, and later would become the guardian of the White Cloud Cave to protect the contents of secret writings that had been carved into the walls of the cave.

From the seasons of spring to autumn, Yuan Gong, the reincarnation of the white monkey who obtained sorcery, became a disciple of the goddess Jiutian Xuannu and was appointed by the Jade Emperor as a “heavenly secretary”. He stole a sacred document and inscribed its contents on the wall of Baiyun Cave, and was put on trial for committing such a crime; he was sentenced to guard Baiyun Cave alone for the rest of his life to prevent anyone from reading the contents of the document he had copied onto its walls. The theft of the sacred document was considered a big deal amongst the divinity; Jiutian Xuannu and Yuan Gong had to calm things down, and putting Yuan Gong on trial and sentencing him to forever guard the cave in which he had copied the document was the only way to defuse the situation.

== See also ==
- Sword of the Yue Maiden
- Yue (state)
- Jian
- Chinese sword
- Baiyue
- Zhejiang
- Interconnected-arm gibbon
- The Three Sui Quash the Demons' Revolt

== Sources ==
- Brindley, Erica Fox (2015), Ancient China and the Yue, Cambridge: Cambridge University Press, ISBN 978-1-107-08478-0.
