= Ode to Gallantry (1989 TV series) =

1989 Hong Kong TV series

- VCD cover art
- Also known as: Where Heroes Dare; Hap Hak Hang
- 俠客行
- Genre: Wuxia
- Based on: Ode to Gallantry by Jin Yong
- Starring: Tony Leung; Sheren Tang
- Theme music composer: Michael Lai
- Opening theme: "A Hero Has No Regrets" (俠客無憾) by David Lui
- Country of origin: Hong Kong
- Original language: Cantonese
- No. of episodes: 20

Production
- Producer: Thomas Ng
- Production location: Hong Kong
- Running time: ≈45 minutes per episode
- Production company: TVB

Original release
- Network: TVB
- Release: 25 December 1989 – 1989

Ode to Gallantry (俠客行) is a Hong Kong wuxia television series adapted from the novel of the same title by Jin Yong. The series was first broadcast on TVB in Hong Kong in 1989.

== Cast ==
- Tony Leung as Shi Potian / Shi Zhongyu
- Sheren Tang as Ding Dang
- Yiu Cheng-ching as Ni Dong'er
- Lau Suk-wah as Tie Shanhu
- Cheng Yin-lai as Shi Jian
- Cheung Yick as Bei Haishi
- Lam Chung as Xie Yanke
- Yu Ka-lun as Murong Bai
- Chu Tit-wo as Shi Qing
- Sheung-koon Yuk as Min Rou
- Chan Ka-pik as Axiu
- Kwan Hoi-san as Bai Zizai
- Leung Po-ching as Shi Xiaocui
- Chun Wong as Ding Busan
- Ho Wai-lung as Ding Busi
- Yip Tin-hang as Yi Tianxing
- Choi Wan as Nangong Yi
- Mak Tin-yan as Bai Wanjian
- Bobby Au-yeung as Li Si
- Chan Wing-chun as Zhang San
- Cheung Ying-choi as Island Master Long
- Suen Kwai-hing as Miaodi
- Tin Ching as Feng Wanli

== See also ==
- Ode to Gallantry (film)
- Ode to Gallantry (1985 TV series)
- Ode to Gallantry (2002 TV series)
- Ode to Gallantry (2017 TV series)
