= Mandarin Duck Blades =

1961 novella by Jin Yong

- Short story by Jin Yong
- Book cover
- Original title: 鴛鴦刀
- Country: Hong Kong
- Language: Chinese
- Genre: Wuxia

Publication
- Publisher: Ming Pao
- Media type: Print
- Publication date: 1961

Mandarin Duck Blades
- Traditional Chinese: 鴛鴦刀
- Simplified Chinese: 鸳鸯刀
- Literal meaning: Mandarin Ducks Sabers
Transcriptions
Standard Mandarin
- Hanyu Pinyin: Yuān Yāng Dāo
Yue: Cantonese
- Jyutping: Jyun^{1} Joeng^{1} Dou^{1}

Mandarin Duck Blades (鴛鴦刀), also known as Blade-Dance of the Two Lovers, is a wuxia novella by Jin Yong (Louis Cha). It was first serialised in 1961 in the Hong Kong newspaper Ming Pao.

== Plot summary ==
The story is set in China during the Qing dynasty. A pair of precious blades known as the Mandarin Duck Blades are being transported to the Forbidden City by a security company commissioned by provincial officials. The blades are highly coveted by many martial artists in the jianghu because they are rumoured to hold a secret to invincibility. The officials have also detained the security company chief's family to ensure that he completes the mission instead of keeping the blades for himself.

Amidst attempts by different parties to intercept the convoy and seize the blades, eventually, through serendipity, the weapons end up in the hands of two couples: Yuan Guannan and Xiao Zhonghui, and Lin Yulong and Ren Feiyan. They are defeated by Zhuo Tianxiong, a highly skilled imperial guard who hides in the convoy to protect the blades. The couples are forced to take shelter in a dilapidated temple while evading Zhuo and his men. Out of desperation, Lin and Ren teach the younger couple, Yuan and Xiao, a sword movement known as the Couple's Sabers. The sword movement covers the two partners' weaknesses while increasing their combat prowess, making them virtually invincible. Yuan and Xiao defeat Zhuo with this new technique.

Later, Yuan visits Xiao's residence during her father's 50th birthday party and receives a warm welcome. He meets Xiao's father, Xiao Banhe, and his wives, Madams Yang and Yuan. During the party, Zhuo and his men show up to seize the blades. At the same time, a group of soldiers show up to arrest Xiao Banhe, who is revealed to be a wanted renegade.

While fighting their way out, the young couple's combat prowess is seriously compromised when they are unnerved upon realising that Yuan Guannan is Madam Yuan's long-lost son, making him Xiao Zhonghui's half-brother. The group takes refuge in a nearby cave, where Xiao Banhe tells his story.

Xiao Banhe reveals himself as a former rebel who had infiltrated the palace by disguising himself as a eunuch. There, he had encountered Yuan and Yang, two other rebels who had been captured and imprisoned along with their families. After Yuan and Yang were executed, he had saved their widows and children. Yuan's son (Yuan Guannan) was separated from the group while they were escaping. Xiao Banhe took care of the two widows and pretended to be their husband all this while. He also raised Yang's daughter (Xiao Zhonghui) as his own child. Upon the revelation of the truth, it means that Yuan and Xiao are not related by blood, hence they can be a couple.

Zhuo is coincidentally captured by the "Four Heroes of Taiyue" – four lucky and not-so-highly skilled comical martial artists – and the soldiers retreat. Xiao Banhe reveals the blades' secret: an inscription which says "the merciful are invincible".

== Characters ==
- Yuan Guannan (袁冠南)
- Xiao Zhonghui (蕭中慧)
- Lin Yulong (林玉龍)
- Ren Feiyan (任飛燕)
- Xiao Banhe (蕭半和)
- Zhuo Tianxiong (卓天雄)
- Zhou Weixin (周威信)
- "Four Heroes of Taiyue" (太岳四俠):
  - Xiaoyaozi (逍遙子)
  - Chang Changfeng (常長風)
  - Hua Jianying (花劍影)
  - Gai Yiming (蓋一鳴)

== Film adaptations ==
In 1961, Hong Kong's Emei Film Company produced a two-part film adapted from the story, directed by Lee Fa, and starring Patricia Lam and Chow Chung as Xiao Zhonghui and Yuan Guannan respectively.

In 1982, Hong Kong's Shaw Brothers Studio produced the film Lovers' Blades directed by Lu Jungu, written by Ni Kuang, and starring Kara Wai as Xiao Zhonghui, Meng Yuan-wen as Yuan Guannan, Yuan De as Lin Yulong, Wen Hsueh-erh as Ren Feiyan, and Wang Lung-wei as Zhuo Tianxiong.
