= Hong Kong Arts Festival =

Hong Kong festival (est. 1973)

- Genre: Arts festival
- Location: Hong Kong
- Years active: 1973–present
- Founded: 1973; 53 years ago

Hong Kong Arts Festival
- Traditional Chinese: 香港藝術節
Transcriptions
Yue: Cantonese
- Yale Romanization: Hēung góng ngaih syuht jit
- Jyutping: Heong^{1} gong^{2} ngai^{6} soet^{6} zit^{3}

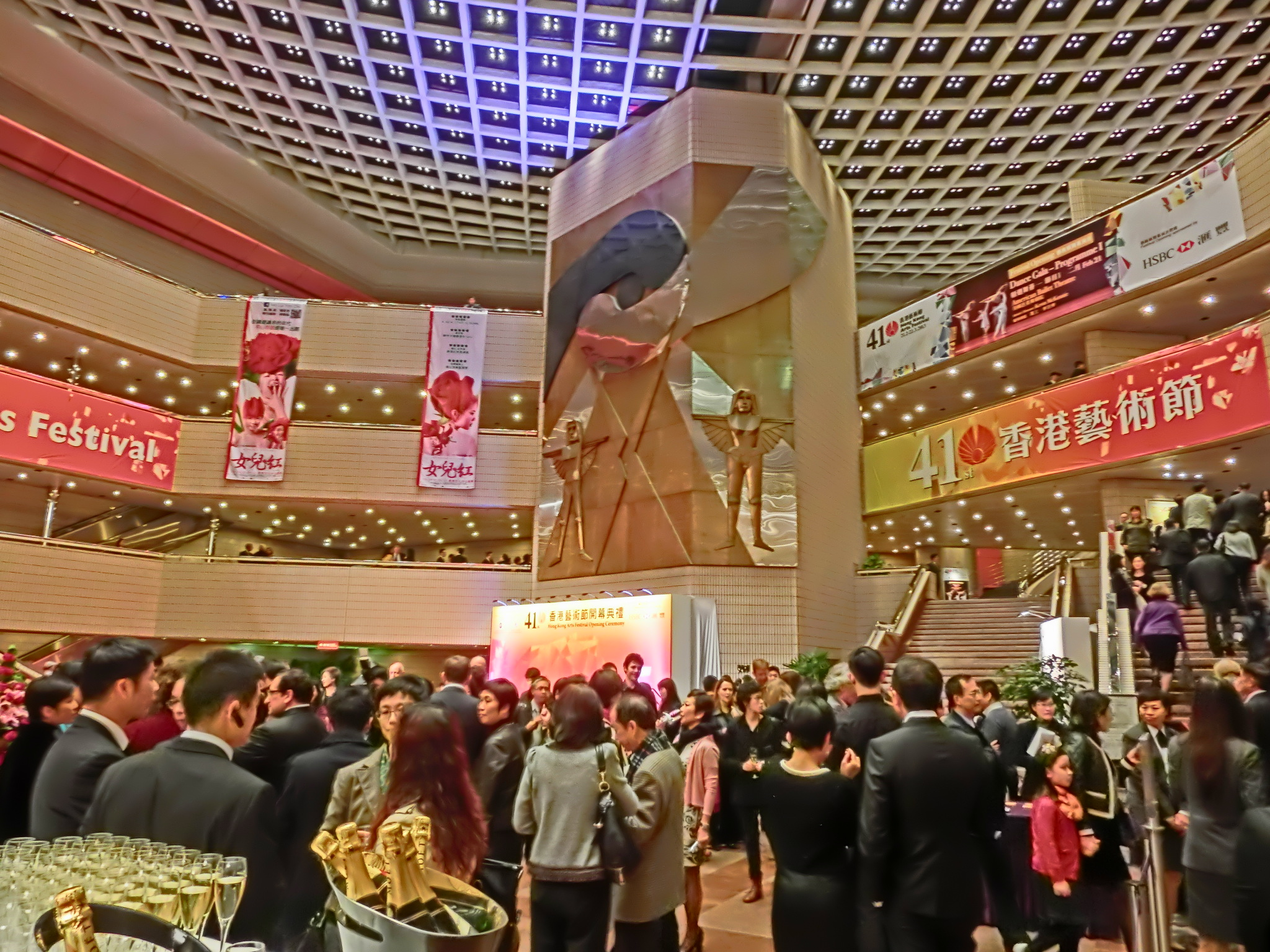
Hong Kong Arts Festival in 2013

The Hong Kong Arts Festival (HKAF), launched in 1973, is an international arts festival held in Hong Kong. It covers all genres of the performing arts as well as a diverse range of educational events in February and March each year.

== History ==
The inaugural Hong Kong Arts Festival (HKAF) took place in 1973.

== Description ==
Genres seen and heard at the Hong Kong Arts Festival include classical music , Western opera, Chinese opera, world music, jazz, drama, dance, musicals. Large-scale special events and outdoor events. HKAF presented top international artists and ensembles, such as Cecilia Bartoli, José Carreras, Yo-Yo Ma, Philip Glass, Kurt Masur, Riccardo Chailly, Mikhail Baryshnikov, Sylvie Guillem, Kevin Spacey, Royal Concertgebouw Orchestra, Mariinsky Theatre, Bavarian State Opera, New York City Ballet, Paris Opera Ballet, Tanztheater Wuppertal Pina Bausch, Cloud Gate Dance Theater, Zingaro, Royal Shakespeare Company, Moscow Art Theatre, and Beijing People's Art Theatre.

HKAF actively collaborates with Hong Kong’s own creative talent and showcases emerging local artists. Over the years, HKAF has commissioned and produced over 250 local productions across genres including Cantonese opera, theatre, chamber opera, music and contemporary dance, many with successful subsequent runs in Hong Kong and overseas.

HKAF frequently partners with renowned international artists and institutions to produce exceptional works, such as Der Fensterputzer (The Window Washer) co-produced with Goethe-Institut Hong Kong and Tanztheater Wuppertal Pina Bausch; Richard III and The Tempest produced by The Old Vic, BAM and Neal Street under “The Bridge Project” with HKAF as a co-commissioning institution; Green Snake co-commissioned with Shanghai International Arts Festival; Dream of the Red Chamber co-produced with San Francisco Opera; Laila, a co-produced with Finnish National Opera and Ballet, and 20,000 Leagues Under the Sea, co-produced with The Central Academy of Drama, China and Compagnie Point Fixe.

HKAF invests heavily in arts education for young people. Over the past 33 years, our “Young Friends” scheme has reached around 849,000 local secondary and tertiary school students. A variety of arts education projects serving primary, secondary, and tertiary school students have been launched in recent years, featuring activities such as student showcases, pre-performance talks, open rehearsals, opportunities to attend Festival performances, as well as in-school workshops and lecture demonstrations led by international and local artists. Donations to the “Student Ticket Scheme” also make available approximately 10,000 half-price student tickets each year.

HKAF organises a diverse range of “Festival PLUS” activities in community locations each year to enhance engagement between artists and audiences. These include films, lecture demonstrations, masterclasses, workshops, symposia, backstage visits, exhibitions, meet-the-artist sessions, and guided cultural tours.

HKAF actively promotes inclusion via the arts to every corner of the community. The “No Limits” project, co-presented with The Hong Kong Jockey Club Charities Trust, was launched in 2019. Through a series of performances and diverse arts experiences for students and the community, “No Limits” strives to create an inclusive space for people with different abilities to share the joy of the arts together.

To provide greater financial security and long-term sustainability for the Festival, the Hong Kong Arts Festival Foundation was officially launched in 2022. Donations to the Foundation will be used towards enabling the Festival to present in the future large-scale or special projects which its annual budget cannot cater for.

== Hong Kong Arts Festival Commissions and New Works ==
Every year the Hong Kong Arts Festival (HKAF) commissions and produces a series of original works that range from chamber opera, contemporary dance, theatre, innovative Beijing opera to contemporary music. These works bring together individual artists and collaborators as well as organisations from different artistic fields, whose talent shines on stage and backstage. Initiated in Hong Kong, these productions are not bound by a geographical “localness”, but transcend the local identity to echo the sensibilities of Mainland China, Taiwan Asia or even the world. This is part of HKAF’s vision as an international arts festival, and the direction it has taken in making arts as a major arts organisation in Hong Kong.

The Festival explores different modes of commissioning and production for each new work. Most of these productions are directly commissioned and produced by the Festival, which supports the creation of these works in every way from the conception of production, script development to selection of performers, creative and production teams, and oversees production arrangements, marketing and publicity, sales, and even the publication of new plays. As an independent producer working within the limits of this often hectic environment for artistic creation and production in Hong Kong, we hope to build a stronger framework with arts practitioners for the creation of new works. Apart from original local productions, we established cross-border collaboration with artists from Mainland China, Taiwan, Germany, France, England, the Netherlands, New Zealand, Vietnam, Japan, Indonesia, Korea, Malaysia, Singapore and the US. In exploring new thematic possibilities and creative concepts, we also set out to expand the international reach of the Festival through these co-commissions.

== Chairs and directors ==
Year	Festival	Chairman	Executive Director
1973	1st HKAF	Sir Run Run Shaw CBE 邵逸夫爵士	
1974	2nd HKAF	Sir Run Run Shaw CBE 邵逸夫爵士	
1975	3rd HKAF	Sir Run Run Shaw CBE 邵逸夫爵士	
1976	4th HKAF	Sir Run Run Shaw CBE 邵逸夫爵士	
1977	5th HKAF	Sir Run Run Shaw CBE 邵逸夫爵士	
1978	6th HKAF	Sir Run Run Shaw CBE 邵逸夫爵士	
1979	7th HKAF	Sir Run Run Shaw CBE 邵逸夫爵士	
1980	8th HKAF	Sir Run Run Shaw CBE 邵逸夫爵士	Keith Statham 史迪敦先生
1981	9th HKAF	Sir Run Run Shaw CBE 邵逸夫爵士	Keith Statham 史迪敦先生
1982	10th HKAF	Sir Run Run Shaw CBE 邵逸夫爵士	Keith Statham 史迪敦先生
1983	11th HKAF	Sir Run Run Shaw CBE 邵逸夫爵士	Keith Statham 史迪敦先生
1984	12th HKAF	Sir Run Run Shaw CBE 邵逸夫爵士	Keith Statham 史迪敦先生
1985	13th HKAF	Sir Run Run Shaw CBE 邵逸夫爵士	Keith Statham 史迪敦先生
1986	14th HKAF	Sir Run Run Shaw CBE 邵逸夫爵士	Keith Statham 史迪敦先生
1987	15th HKAF	Sir Run Run Shaw CBE 邵逸夫爵士	Keith Statham 史迪敦先生
1988	16th HKAF	Sir Run Run Shaw CBE 邵逸夫爵士	Tseng Sun Man 鄭新文先生
1989	17th HKAF	Sir Run Run Shaw CBE 邵逸夫爵士	Tseng Sun Man 鄭新文先生
1990	18th HKAF	The Hon Martin Barrow OBE JP 鮑磊先生	Tseng Sun Man 鄭新文先生
1991	19th HKAF	The Hon Martin Barrow OBE JP 鮑磊先生	Tseng Sun Man 鄭新文先生
1992	20th HKAF	The Hon Martin Barrow OBE JP 鮑磊先生	Tseng Sun Man 鄭新文先生
1993	21st HKAF	The Hon Martin Barrow OBE JP 鮑磊先生	Tseng Sun Man 鄭新文先生
1994	22nd HKAF	The Hon Martin Barrow OBE JP 鮑磊先生	Tseng Sun Man 鄭新文先生
1995	23rd HKAF	The Hon Martin Barrow OBE JP 鮑磊先生	Kau Ng 吳球先生
1996	24th HKAF	The Hon Martin Barrow OBE JP 鮑磊先生	Kau Ng 吳球先生
1997	25th HKAF	The Hon Martin Barrow OBE JP 鮑磊先生	Kau Ng 吳球先生
1998	26th HKAF	The Hon Martin Barrow OBE JP 鮑磊先生	Kau Ng 吳球先生
1999	27th HKAF	The Hon Martin Barrow OBE JP 鮑磊先生	Kau Ng 吳球先生
2000	28th HKAF	The Hon Martin Barrow OBE JP 鮑磊先生	Kau Ng 吳球先生
2001	29th HKAF	The Hon Martin Barrow OBE JP 鮑磊先生	Kau Ng 吳球先生
2002	30th HKAF	Mona Leung 梁紹榮夫人	Kau Ng 吳球先生
2003	31st HKAF	Mona Leung 梁紹榮夫人	Douglas Gautier 高德禮先生
2004	32nd HKAF	Charles Y K Lee 李業廣先生	Douglas Gautier 高德禮先生
2005	33rd HKAF	Charles Y K Lee 李業廣先生	Douglas Gautier 高德禮先生
2006	34th HKAF	Charles Y K Lee 李業廣先生	Douglas Gautier 高德禮先生
2007	35th HKAF	Charles Y K Lee 李業廣先生	Ms. Tisa Ho 何嘉坤女士
2008	36th HKAF	Charles Y K Lee 李業廣先生	Ms. Tisa Ho 何嘉坤女士
2009	37th HKAF	Charles Y K Lee 李業廣先生	Ms. Tisa Ho 何嘉坤女士
2010	38th HKAF	Charles Y K Lee 李業廣先生	Ms. Tisa Ho 何嘉坤女士
2011	39th HKAF	Charles Y K Lee 李業廣先生	Ms. Tisa Ho 何嘉坤女士
2012	40th HKAF	Charles Y K Lee 李業廣先生	Ms. Tisa Ho 何嘉坤女士
2013	41st HKAF	Charles Y K Lee 李業廣先生	Ms. Tisa Ho 何嘉坤女士
2014	42nd HKAF	Ronald Arculli 夏佳理先生	Ms. Tisa Ho 何嘉坤女士
2015	43rd HKAF	Ronald Arculli 夏佳理先生	Ms. Tisa Ho 何嘉坤女士
2016	44th HKAF	Victor Cha 查懋成先生	Ms. Tisa Ho 何嘉坤女士
2017	45th HKAF	Victor Cha 查懋成先生	Ms. Tisa Ho 何嘉坤女士
2018	46th HKAF	Victor Cha 查懋成先生	Ms. Tisa Ho 何嘉坤女士
2019	47th HKAF	Victor Cha 查懋成先生	Ms. Tisa Ho 何嘉坤女士
2020	48th HKAF	Victor Cha 查懋成先生	Ms. Tisa Ho 何嘉坤女士
2021	49th HKAF	Victor Cha 查懋成先生	Ms. Tisa Ho 何嘉坤女士
2022	50th HKAF	Victor Cha 查懋成先生	Flora Yu 余潔儀女士
2023	51st HKAF	Victor Cha 查懋成先生	Flora Yu 余潔儀女士
2024	52nd HKAF	Lo King-man 盧景文先生	Flora Yu 余潔儀女士
2025	53rd HKAF	Lo King-man 盧景文先生	Flora Yu 余潔儀女士
2026	54th HKAF	Lo King-man 盧景文先生	Flora Yu 余潔儀女士

== Selected past events ==
Year	Programme Highlights Festival Opening	Programme Highlights Festival Finale
1996		Julio Bocca & Ballet Argentino
1997	Tan Dun Marco Polo	Montreal Symphony Orchestra
1998	Richard Strauss Salome Los Angeles Opera	Compania Nacional de Danza
1999	Cantonese Opera – An All-Star Night	Hamburg Ballet A Midsummer Night's Dream
2000	China National Symphony Orchestra	Birmingham Royal Ballet Edward II
2001	Rossini's La Cenerentola	National Ballet of China Raise the Red Lantern
2002	Bolshoi Theatre Boris Godunov	National Ballet of China Raise the Red Lantern
2003	Stuttgart Opera The Abduction from the Seraglio	Hamburg Ballet Nijinsky
2004	Komische Oper Berlin The Merry Widow	London Symphony Orchestra under Gennadi Rozhdestvensky
2005	Polish National Opera - Otello Conductor: Jacek Kaspszyk Director: Mariusz Trelinski Tenor: Richard Decker Tenor: Krzysztof Bednarek	Ballet Nacional de Espana Director: Jose Antonio
2006	Michael Tilson Thomas and San Francisco Symphony Soloist: Lynn Harrell	Semper Opera Dresden and Opera Nuremberg Mozart's Don Giovanni Conductor: Howard Arman Director: Willy Decker
2007	Yuri Simonov and the Moscow Philharmonic Orchestra Soloist: Konstantin Lifschitz Soloist: Boris Belkin Soloist: Shen Wenyu	Tango Buenos Aires
2008	Stuttgart Ballet - Swan Lake Choreographer: John Cranko	Vladimie Jurowski and the London Philharmonic Orchestra Soloist: Nikolaj Znaider Soloist: Jean-Yves Thibaudet
2009	Bernard Haitink and the Chicago Symphony Orchestra	Lisa Ono A celebration of 50 years of Bossa Nova
2010	Cantonese Opera Treasures	Valery Gergiev and the Mariinsky Orchestra
2011	Cecilia Bartoli	Lost Tango Ute Lemper and the Piazzolla Sextet
2012	The Hamburg Ballet John Neumeier Third Symphony of Gustav Mahler	Bavarian Radio Symphony Orchestra - Daniel Harding
2013	American Ballet Theatre - Dance Gala AD: Kevin McKenzie	Teatro Di San Carlo - Viva Verdi Conductor: Michele Mariotti Choral Director: Salvatore Caputo
2014	Guerzenich Orchestra Cologne	Savonlinna Opera Festival Gala Concert
2015	Christian Thielemann & the Staatskapelle Dresden	The Bolshoi Ballet - Jewels
2016	Compagnia Finzi Pasca - La Verità (The Truth)	The Mikhailovsky Ballet - The Sleeping Beauty
2017	Bayerisches Staatsballett (Bavarian State Ballet) - La Bayadère	A co-production between San Francisco Opera and the Hong Kong Arts Festival - Dream of the Red Chamber
2018	Ballett Zürich - Anna Karenina	Estonian National Symphony Orchestra and Estonian National Male Choir
2019	Marin Alsop with the São Paulo Symphony Orchestra	The Hamburg Ballet-John Neumeier - The World of John Neumeier
2020	Andris Nelsons with the Boston Symphony Orchestra (Cancelled due to the COVID-19 pandemic)	Igor Moiseyev Ballet - Legend of the Century (Cancelled due to the COVID-19 pandemic)
2021	Hong Kong Chinese Orchestra - Music About China	Igor Moiseyev State Academic Ensemble of Popular Dance - Igor Moiseyev Ballet Special
2022	Paris Opera Ballet Romeo and Juliet	Shanghai Opera House: Concert version of Cavalleria Rusticana & Pagliacci
2023	Ballet of the Slovene National Theatre Maribor: Radio and Juliet & The Rite of Spring	Bamberg Symphony (Conducted by Jakub Hrůša)
2024	Bayerische Staatsoper: Ariadne auf Naxos	Shanghai Ballet: In the Mood for Love
2025	Orchestra del Teatro Comunale di Bologna	China NCPA Orchestra (Conducted by Lü Jia)
2026	Ballet Nacional de España—La Bella Otero	Dance Theatre—Dream in The Peony Pavilion
