= Patricia Lam =

Chinese actress from Hong Kong

- Chinese: 林鳳
- Born: Fung Suk Yin; 1941
- Died: 1976 (aged 36–37)
- Other names: Patricia Lam Fung, Lam Foong, Lam Fung, Lim Fung, Lin Feng,
- Occupation: Actress
- Years active: 1948–1978
- Known for: Cantonese opera films

Patricia Lam (Chinese: 林鳳; 1941–1976) was a former Chinese actress from Hong Kong. Lam was credited with over 150 films. She has a star at the Avenue of Stars in Hong Kong.

== Early life ==
In 1941, Lam was born as Fung Suk Yin in Guangdong province, China. Lam attended Precious Blood Girls' School.

== Career ==
In 1948, Lam became a child actress in Hong Kong. She appeared in Underground Maze, a 1948 thriller film directed by Yam Wu-Fa. In 1957, at age 16, Lam joined Shaw Brothers Studio in Hong Kong. Lam's first Shaw Brothers film was The Fairy Sleeves, a 1957 Cantonese opera film directed by Chow Sze-Luk. Lam became a lead actress in many Hong Kong films. Lam is known for her sweet and innocent roles. Lam became a Shaw's Gem and known as the golden girl (aka Jade Girl). Lam had a fan club and its membership was peaked at 30,000 members. In 1967, Lam retired from acting. Lam's last Cantonese opera film was The Imperial Warrant, a 1968 film directed by Yang Fan. Lam is credited with over 150 films.

== Filmography ==
=== Films ===
This is a partial list of films.

- 1948 Underground Maze
- 1957 The Fairy Sleeves
- 1957 The Marriage Between the Quick and the Dead
- 1958 A Pretty Girl's Love Affair
- 1958 A Virtuous Girl from a Humble House
- 1958 Princess Jade Lotus – Princess King-Lin/Jade Lotus
- 1958 Sweet Girl in Terror – Lee Suk Kan
- 1959 Young Rock – Dani Lau
- 1959 Love on the Lonely Bridge (aka Merdeka Bridge, Love on Merdeka Bridge) – Songstress Yim-mui
- 1959 Glass Slippers
- 1961 Twin Swords, a Mandarin Duck Blades adaptation – Xiao Zhonghui
- 1960 Love and Chasity
- 1967 The Butterfly Legend
- 1967 The Full Moon
- 1968 The Imperial Warrant

== Awards ==
- Star – Avenue of Stars, Tsim Sha Tsui waterfront in Hong Kong

== Personal life ==
In 1967, Lam married. On August 28, 1976, Lam died.
