= Sword of the Yue Maiden =

1970 wuxia novel by Jin Yong

- Book cover
- Author: Jin Yong
- Original title: 越女劍
- Language: Chinese
- Genre: Wuxia
- Publisher: Ming Pao
- Publication date: 1970
- Publication place: Hong Kong
- Media type: Print
- Followed by: Demi-Gods and Semi-Devils

Sword of the Yue Maiden
- Traditional Chinese: 越女劍
- Simplified Chinese: 越女剑
Transcriptions
Standard Mandarin
- Hanyu Pinyin: Yuè Nǚ Jiàn
Yue: Cantonese
- Jyutping: Jyut^{6} Neoi^{5} Gim^{3}

Sword of the Yue Maiden (越女劍), alternatively translated as Yue Maiden's Sword, is a wuxia novelette by Jin Yong (Louis Cha) based on the legend of Yuenü. It was first serialised in January 1970 in the Hong Kong newspaper Ming Pao Evening Supplement. Although this is the last wuxia short work by the author, its historical setting, in the fifth century BC during the Spring and Autumn period, is chronologically the earliest among Jin Yong's works.

== Plot summary ==
The story is set in southern China in the fifth century BC during the Spring and Autumn period against the backdrop of the conflict between the states of Wu and Yue. A team of Wu swordsmen defeats the best swordsmen in Yue. Fan Li, an adviser to King Goujian of Yue, discovers Aqing, a highly skilled swordswoman, and gets her to defeat the Wu swordsmen.

It is revealed that Aqing learned her skills while playing mock sword duels with a white gibbon. Fan Li engages Aqing to train the Yue soldiers in swordsmanship and gradually falls in love with her. King Goujian of Yue finally defeats his rival, King Fuchai of Wu, after enduring hardship and humiliation.

Fan Li is reunited with his lover Xi Shi, who had earlier been sent as a concubine to Fuchai. Out of jealousy, Aqing intends to kill Xi Shi upon seeing her. However, when she sees Xi Shi for the first time, she is so taken aback by her beauty and accidentally hurts Xi Shi with her neigong while thrusting her sword towards Xi Shi, even though the blade did not touch Xi Shi at all. Xi Shi clutches her bosom in pain, and the expression on her face is described as "so beautiful that it will take away the soul of any man who looks upon her". This is the origin of the Chinese phrase "Xi Shi clutching her bosom" (西子捧心), which refers to a woman's beauty being enhanced when she is in a state of distress or agony.

== Adaptations ==
In 1986, Hong Kong's ATV produced a 20-episode television series The Supersword Lady based on the novel, starring Moon Lee as Aqing.

== See also ==
- Yuenü
