= White Horse Neighs in the Western Wind =

1961 novel by Jin Yong

- An excerpt of the novel from Ming Pao
- Author: Jin Yong
- Original title: 白馬嘯西風
- Language: Chinese
- Genre: Wuxia
- Publisher: Ming Pao
- Publication date: 1961
- Publication place: Hong Kong
- Media type: Print

White Horse Neighs in the Western Wind
- Traditional Chinese: 白馬嘯西風
- Simplified Chinese: 白马啸西风
- Literal meaning: White Horse Neighs (in) West Wind
Transcriptions
Standard Mandarin
- Hanyu Pinyin: Bái Mǎ Xiào Xī Fēng
Yue: Cantonese
- Jyutping: Baak^{6} Maa^{5} Siu^{3} Sai^{1} Fung^{1}

"White Horse Neighs in the Western Wind" (白馬嘯西風), also translated as "Swordswoman Riding West on White Horse", is a wuxia novella by Jin Yong (Louis Cha). It was first published in 1961 in the Hong Kong newspaper Ming Pao.

== Plot summary ==
The plot follows the third edition of the novella. The original serialised version has a different ending, while the characterisations of certain characters such as Old Man Ji have been drastically altered in the revised editions.

Li Wenxiu, a Han Chinese girl, loses her parents in the Gobi Desert while escaping from a group of bandits who are after a map of Gaochang. Placed on a white steed, she flees to Kazakh territory and is taken into the care of Old Man Ji, an elderly Han Chinese man. While growing up, she meets Supu, a Kazakh boy, and starts a romance with him. However, Supu's father disapproves of the relationship between his son and a Han Chinese girl, so they are forced to separate.

Several years later, Li meets the hermit Hua Hui in an oasis in the desert, and helps him cure his wounds. Feeling grateful to her, Hua takes her as his apprentice and teaches her martial arts. She returns home in the midst of heavy snowfall and sees Supu, his father, and his new lover taking shelter in her house. The bandits who killed Li's parents show up and suspect that the map they have been hunting for is inside the house. They ransack the house for the map and eventually find it. The secret of the map is revealed when blood is spilled on the cloth. The bandits want to silence Supu and the others but Li, who has disguised herself as an old man, intervenes and defeats the bandits.

The bandits flee with the map and finds their way to Gaochang, while Li and Supu gather five others to join them in pursuing the bandits. The seven of them make their way to Gaochang, where they are surprised to find ordinary items associated with Han Chinese culture instead of treasure as they had expected. To their horror, they encounter a "ghost" who haunts them by killing their companions without leaving any traces. Just as they are about to flee, Supu learns that his lover has been kidnapped by the "ghost" so he tracks the "ghost" to its lair, where he discovers that the "ghost" is actually a martial artist in disguise.

The "ghost" tells his story and reveals that he was forced into exile because he had been betrayed by his apprentice, who turns out to be Old Man Ji. The "ghost" is Hua, whom Li saved earlier. To everyone's surprise, Ji turns out to be a man in his 30s in disguise as an old man. Ji and Hua start fighting each other. Li is shocked to realise that the two, who are close to her, are actually bitter enemies. Hua eventually dies in his futile attempt to kill everyone in Gaochang. After leaving Gaochang, Li hears the true story behind the items hidden in Gaochang and their origins. She decides to head back to central China as she feels miserable after the loss of two of her loved ones and the marriage of her lover to another woman.

== Principal characters ==
- Li Wenxiu (李文秀) – the protagonist
- Hua Hui (華輝) – a hermit who taught Li martial arts
- Ma Jiajun (馬家駿) / "Old Man Ji" (計老人) – the elderly man who raised Li
- Li San (李三) and Shangguan Hong (上官虹) – Li's parents
- Supu (蘇普) – a Kazakh boy and Li's childhood playmate
- Aman (阿曼) – a Kazakh girl who becomes Supu's new lover
- Huo Yuanlong (霍元龍), Shi Zhongjun (史仲俊), and Chen Dahai (陳達海) – the bandits who killed Li's parents for the map of the Gaochang labyrinth

== Adaptations ==
- In the 1979, Hong Kong's RTV produced a television series based on the story, starring Sharon Yeung as Li Wenxiu.
- In 1982, Taiwan's CTV produced a television series based on the story, starring David Chiang and Kwan Chung.
