= Ode to Gallantry (film) =

1982 Hong Kong film by Chang Cheh

- DVD cover art
- 俠客行
- Directed by: Chang Cheh
- Screenplay by: Chang Cheh; Ni Kuang
- Based on: Ode to Gallantry by Jin Yong
- Produced by: Mona Fong
- Starring: Philip Kwok; Wen Hsueh-erh; Wang Li
- Cinematography: Cho Wai-kei
- Edited by: Chiang Hsing-lung; Lee Yim-hoi
- Music by: Eddie H. Wang
- Production company: Shaw Brothers Studio
- Distributed by: Shaw Brothers Studio; Celestial Pictures
- Release date: 16 December 1982
- Running time: 83 minutes
- Country: Hong Kong
- Language: Mandarin
- Box office: HK$1,013,819

Ode To Gallantry (俠客行) is a 1982 Hong Kong wuxia film adapted from the novel of the same title by Jin Yong. The film was produced by the Shaw Brothers Studio, directed by Chang Cheh, and starring the Venom Mob. Formerly one of the rarest Venom Mob films available, it has been digitally remastered and released by Celestial Pictures.

== Synopsis ==
Gouzazhong, a boy searching for his mother, serendipitously finds an iron tablet which belongs to the eccentric martial artist Xie Yanke, who has promised to do anything for whoever helps him find it. When Xie Yanke offers all sorts of things to Gouzazhong, the latter declines all of them, so a frustrated Xie Yanke decides to purposely teach him the wrong neigong techniques in the hope that the boy will end up destroying himself.

Gouzazhong ends up in a zouhuorumo state and abandoned by Xie, but luckily he is saved by Bei Haishi of the Changle Clan. Bei Haishi takes Gouzazhong back to the clan, where the clan members call him Shi Zhongyu and honour him as their leader. He also meets Dingdang, a woman who behaves intimately with him. Later, Gouzazhong's neigong prowess improves dramatically by chance after a clan member accidentally hits an acupuncture point on him.

Just as Gouzazhong is feeling confused about his identity, he realises that he has unexplained scars on his body which the real Shi Zhongyu has. He is forced to marry Dingdang, and later runs into trouble with the Snowy Mountain Sect, who are seeking to punish Shi Zhongyu for breaking their sect's rules.

It is eventually revealed that Gouzazhong is actually Shi Zhongyu's twin brother Shi Potian, and he has been manipulated by Bei Haishi to become the Changle Clan's leader. Shi Potian ultimately resolves the clan's disputes with Xie Yanke and the Snowy Mountain Sect, and clarifies his identity when the real Shi Zhongyu shows up. It also turns out that Shi Potian had been raised by Mei Fanggu, whom he thought was his mother. Mei Fanggu was the Shi brothers' father's scorned lover, and she had kidnapped Shi Potian and raised him to kill his biological mother. Shi Potian refuses to kill his mother and defeats Mei Fanggu's bodyguards, reuniting with his parents at last.

== Cast ==
- Philip Kwok as Gouzazhong / Shi Zhongyu
- Wen Hsueh-erh as Dingdang
- Wang Li as Xie Yanke
- Tang Ching as Shi Qing
- Lau Wai-ling as Min Rou
- Sun Chien as Bei Haishi
- Yu Tai-ping as Zhu Hengye
- Zhou Jianping as Qiu Shanfeng
- Tan Zhendu as Zhan Fei
- Yau Chui-ling as Shijian
- Teresa Ha as Mei Fanggu
- Chiang Sheng as White Tiger
- Chu Ko as Azure Dragon
- Ricky Cheng as Vermilion Bird
- Yeung Chi-hing as Ding Busan
- Chan Shen as Bai Wanjian
- Wah Lun as Wen Wanfu
- Yeung Hsiung as Feng Wanli
- Wong Wai-wai as Hua Wanzi

== See also ==
- Ode to Gallantry (1985 TV series)
- Ode to Gallantry (1989 TV series)
- Ode to Gallantry (2002 TV series)
- Ode to Gallantry (2017 TV series)
