= Ode to Gallantry (1985 TV series) =

1985 Taiwanese TV series

- VCD cover art
- 俠客行
- Genre: Wuxia
- Based on: Ode to Gallantry by Jin Yong
- Starring: Max Mok; Chao Yung-hsin
- Country of origin: Taiwan
- Original language: Mandarin

Production
- Production location: Taiwan
- Production company: CTS

Original release
- Network: CTS
- Release: 1985 – 1985

Ode to Gallantry (俠客行) is a Taiwanese wuxia television series adapted from the novel of the same title by Jin Yong. The series was broadcast on CTS in Taiwan in 1985.

== Cast ==
- Max Mok as Xiaogouzi / Shi Zhongyu
- Chao Yung-hsin as Ding Dang
- Chao Chia-jung as Axiu
- Chou Hsiao-yun as Shi Jian
- Chang Fu-chian as Xie Yanke
- Chang Feng as Bai Zizai
- Lung Lung as Shi Qing
- Yeh Chia-ling as Min Rou
- Huang Chung-yu as Tianmo
- Tseng Ya-chun as Mei Fanggu
- Lu I-lung as Bei Haishi
- Ma Hui-chen as Shi Xiaocui / Shi Popo
- Hou Po-wei as Ding Busan
- Chiang Sheng as Ding Busi
- Yeh Fei as Bai Wanjian
- Sung Chang-chiang as Bai Wanren
- Ming-kuang as Hua Wanxu
- Yu-shang as Ouyang Wuzui
- Hsu Wen-jui as Geng Wanzhong
- Tso Yao-hu as Pidan
- Han Hsiang-chin as Liu Ruyan
- Cheng Hui-hung as Lady Feng
- Wang Wei-chiang as Feng Wanli
- Chen Sung-jung as the cult leader

== See also ==
- Ode to Gallantry (film)
- Ode to Gallantry (1989 TV series)
- Ode to Gallantry (2002 TV series)
- Ode to Gallantry (2017 TV series)
