= Victor Cha Mou Zing =

Hong Kong businessman

Victor Cha Mou-zing
- Education: MBA, Sloan Fellow, Stanford University
- Occupation: Chairman HKR International Limited
- Spouse: Laura Shih May-lung
- Parent: Dr. Cha Chi Ming Dr. Liu Bie Ju
- Awards: University Fellow, Hong Kong Polytechnic University (2010)

Victor Cha Mou Zing
- Chinese: 查懋成
Transcriptions
Standard Mandarin
- Hanyu Pinyin: Zhā Màochéng

Victor Cha Mou Zing is a Hong Kong businessman and has extensive experience in property development and textile manufacturing. He is the Chairman of HKR International Limited.

== Career ==
Victor Cha was appointed executive director, managing director, deputy chairman and chairman in 1989, 2001, 2007 and 2020 respectively. He is a non-executive director of Mingly Corporation. He is also the chairman of both the Hong Kong Arts Festival and the Hong Kong Trade Development Council’s Hong Kong-Japan Business Co-operation Committee. He is a member of the board of trustees of The Better Hong Kong Foundation, a member of the Board of Trustee of the Cha Foundation, an Executive Committee Member of Qiu Shi Science and Technologies Foundation and a trustee of the Sang Ma Trust Fund.
