= Zha Siting =

Zha Siting (Chinese: 查嗣庭, 1664 (Note: Zha's year of birth is calculated based on a 1713 poem by his brother Zha Shenxing, which states that Siting had just reached the age of 50 sui.'"`UNIQ--ref-00000000-QINU`"')–1727), courtesy name Runmu (Chinese: 潤木), art name Hengpu (Chinese: 橫浦), was a Qing dynasty official who was a victim of the Literary Inquisition. He was from Haining, Zhejiang.

== Life ==
Zha Siting passed the jinshi examinations in 1706. After a period of study at the Hanlin Academy, he became a compiler at the academy, and after several promotions he became a vice-president in the Ministry of Rites in 1725. In 1726, he was sent to Nanchang to conduct the Jiangxi juren examinations. The composition topic he chose was a phrase from the Shijing which read "where the people rest" (維民所止). The first character (維) and the last character (止) both resembled the era name of the reigning Yongzheng Emperor (雍正) but without the top parts, which some interpreted as a wish for the emperor to be decapitated. The emperor was furious and ordered Zha's arrest. On 21 October 1726 he informed the court that Zha's house had been searched and two journals of a seditious nature were found. The journals included sarcastic comments about the Confucian scholars training for the bureaucracy in the Beijing academies and mocking comments about the emperor and his late father. The emperor also accused Zha of having intrigued with the disgraced official Longkodo, which may have been the real reason for the emperor's hostility.

Zha died in prison in 1727 and after his death his body was ordered to be dismembered. His elder brothers Zha Shenxing and Zha Sili were imprisoned. His wife was exiled to the frontier, where she achieved some fame as a poet.

As a result of Zha's case and similar cases involving others from Zhejiang (Wang Jingqi and Lü Liuliang), the emperor declared the entire province "degenerate" and in retaliation he forbade any Zhejiang students to move on to the 1727 national examinations in the capital. The emperor also decreed that the 1729 Zhejiang juren examinations be suspended. Shortly after the decree went out, the emperor also ordered Zhejiang governor Li Wei and Wang Guodong (王國棟) to investigate conditions in the province. Two years later, they reported back that they had found no signs of rebellion and proposed that the emperor hold examinations again. The 1729 Zhejiang examination would be held on schedule.

== Bibliography ==
- Goodrich, Luther Carrington (1966) [1935]. The Literary Inquisition of Ch'ien-Lung (2nd ed.). Paragon Book Reprint Corp. OCLC 1356777.
- Hummel, Arthur W. Sr., ed. (1943). "Cha Ssŭ-t'ing" . Eminent Chinese of the Ch'ing Period. United States Government Printing Office.
- Spence, Jonathan D. (2001). Treason by the Book. Viking Press. ISBN 9780670892921.
