= Laura Cha =

American lawyer

The Honourable Laura Cha GBM GBS JP
- 查史美倫
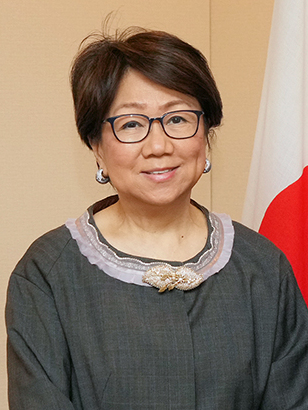
- Cha in 2022

Non-official Member of the Executive Council of Hong Kong
- In office 19 October 2004 – 30 June 2022
- Chief Executive: Tung Chee-hwa; Donald Tsang; Leung Chun-ying; Carrie Lam

HK Deputy to the NPC
- In office 2008–2018
- Chairman: Wu Bangguo
- Congress: 11th NPC; 12th NPC

Personal details
- Born: Shih May-lung; 5 December 1949 (age 76) Shanghai, China
- Education: University of Wisconsin–Madison (BA); Santa Clara University (JD)

Laura Cha Shih May-lung
- Traditional Chinese: 查史美倫
- Simplified Chinese: 查史美伦
Transcriptions
Standard Mandarin
- Hanyu Pinyin: Zhā Shǐ Měilún
Yue: Cantonese
- Yale Romanization: Chàh Sí Méihlèuhn
- Jyutping: Caa4 Si2 Mei5leon4

Laura Cha Shih May-lung, GBM, GBS, JP (Chinese: 查史美倫; born 5 December 1949) is a Hong Kong businesswoman and politician. She is a former chair of Hong Kong Stock Exchange and non-executive deputy chair of The Hongkong and Shanghai Banking Corporation. She served as a non-official member of the Executive Council of Hong Kong from 2004 to 2022.

== Early life and education ==
On 5 December 1949, Cha was born in Shanghai, China. At age 2, Cha and her family moved to British Hong Kong.

Cha earned a Bachelor of Arts degree from the University of Wisconsin–Madison and a Juris Doctor degree from the Santa Clara University School of Law. She was a member of the Committee of 100, a Chinese American political and cultural organisation.

== Career ==
In 1983, Cha was admitted to the State Bar of California as Laura May-Lung Cha. Cha practised law at Pillsbury Madison and Sutro in San Francisco, California. Since 1994, Cha no longer practices law in California.

After her return to Hong Kong, Cha continued practising law with Coudert Brothers. She worked at Hong Kong's Securities and Futures Commission from 1991 to early 2001, becoming its deputy chairman in 1998.

Cha served as Hong Kong's delegate to the 11th National People's Congress, Vice-Chairman of the International Advisory Council of the CSRC, Chairman of the University Grants Committee in Hong Kong, and a member of the advisory board of the Millstein Center of Corporate Governance and Performance at Yale University.

Cha was Vice-Chairman of the China Securities Regulatory Commission (CSRC) from 2001 to 2004. Cha was appointed to the post by the State Council of the People's Republic of China and became the first person outside mainland China to join the Central People's Government of the People's Republic of China at the vice-ministerial rank. Cha renounced US citizenship to take up the position.

In 2012, Cha was named an Honorary Fellow by the Hong Kong Securities and Investment Institute.

== 2014 Hong Kong protests controversy ==
Cha was reported by The Standard to have likened the pro-Occupy activists demand for democracy in the 2014 Hong Kong protests to the emancipation of African-American slaves at a conference at Paris, asking why Universal Suffrage "could not wait" for Hong Kongers in light of the historical disenfranchisement of African Americans. Her remarks were criticised on social media, with a petition to the board of directors of HSBC on Change.org stating that the signatories, "will not stand these remarks likening our rights to slavery, nor will we stand the kind of voter disenfranchisement her and her associates attempt to perpetrate on the Hong Kong public."

== Personal life ==
Cha is married and has two children. Cha's husband, Victor, is a prominent Hong Kong businessman. Cha renounced her United States citizenship prior to taking a position with China.

== Awards and recognitions ==
On 12 May 2011, Cha was an recognized by Committee of 100 for her philanthropic contributions to higher education at the 20th Awards Gala in New York, U.S.

Cha was awarded the Grand Bauhinia Medal (GBM) by the Hong Kong SAR Government in 2017.

Order of precedence
Previous: Rimsky Yuen; Recipients of the Grand Bauhinia Medal	Hong Kong order of precedence Recipients of the Grand Bauhinia Medal	Succeeded by Fanny Law; Recipients of the Grand Bauhinia Medal
