= Ode to Gallantry =

1966–1967 wuxia novel by Jin Yong

- Cover of a 1980 edition of the novel
- Author: Jin Yong
- Original title: 俠客行
- Language: Chinese
- Genre: Wuxia
- Publisher: Ming Pao
- Publication date: 1965
- Publication place: Hong Kong
- Media type: Print
- ISBN: 9789573262077

Ode to Gallantry
- Traditional Chinese: 俠客行
- Simplified Chinese: 侠客行
Transcriptions
Standard Mandarin
- Hanyu Pinyin: Xiá Kè Xíng
Yue: Cantonese
- Jyutping: Haap^{6} Haak^{3} Haang^{4}

Ode to Gallantry (俠客行) is a wuxia novel by Jin Yong (Louis Cha). It was first serialised in Hong Kong from 11 June 1966 to 19 April 1967 in the newspaper Ming Pao. The novel shares the same Chinese title as a poem by the Tang dynasty poet Li Bai, which was used as its epigraph.

== Plot ==
The story follows a case of mistaken identity involving a pair of identical brothers. In the afterword, Jin Yong acknowledges that the story resembles some of the works of William Shakespeare (cf. Twelfth Night and The Comedy of Errors).

The protagonist, who refers to himself as "Gouzazhong" (literally "mongrel"; a colloquialism for "bastard"), first appears as a young beggar roaming the streets of Kaifeng in search of his lost mother. He witnesses a fight between several notable figures in the wulin and meets the Shi couple and members of the Snowy Mountain Sect. An accident causes him to be taken away by Xie Yanke, an eccentric martial artist, to a secluded location on Sky-Scraping Cliff. Xie Yanke, who is frequently bothered by Gouzazhong, decides to teach him martial arts. Gouzazhong learns neigong cultivation techniques under Xie Yanke's tutelage for six years. He is unaware that Xie actually harbours ill intentions and has been deliberately teaching him the techniques wrongly in the hope that he will end up in a zouhuorumo state and eventually die.

At the same time, the leader of the Changle Clan, Shi Zhongyu, mysteriously disappears. The greater part of the novel deals with the complications that arise when Gouzhazhong is mistaken for Shi Zhongyu, not only by members of the Changle Clan (for ulterior motives), by also by Shi Zhongyu's parents, Shi Zhongyu's lover Ding Dang, and members of the Snowy Mountain Sect. Although the two bear a spitting resemblance, their characters cannot be more different: Gouzhazhong is simple, honest and clever; Shi Zhongyu, the son of the Shi couple, has a bad reputation for being a lewd and sly womaniser. Gouzhazhong acquires consummate combat skills in the process. He is hounded by members of the Snowy Mountain Sect who mistake him for Shi Zhongyu, who had molested Axiu, the granddaughter of the Snowy Mountain Sect's leader. He acquires Axiu as his girlfriend after various incidents, during which their misunderstandings are gradually resolved.

The novel culminates in an episode when the leaders of various sects are coerced into visiting a secluded island by a pair of mysterious, highly skilled messengers to celebrate the Laba Festival. The story then leads to a surprising conclusion: revelations on the island and more revelations concerning Gouzhazhong's true parentage.

== Adaptations ==
=== Films ===
Year	Production	Main cast	Additional information
1982	Shaw Brothers Studio (Hong Kong)	Philip Kwok, Wen Hsueh-erh	See Ode to Gallantry (film)
2024	Gnp Films (Indonesia), Vivamax (philippines)	Alex Chong (張詩琪), Bibs Lhoo Luvelle (邱薇如)	Haap Hak Hang Package Deal (Tele-movie.)

=== Television ===
Year	Production	Main cast	Additional information
1985	CTS (Taiwan)	Max Mok, Chao Yung-hsin, Chao Chia-jung	See Ode to Gallantry (1985 TV series)
1989	TVB (Hong Kong)	Tony Leung, Sheren Tang, Chan Ka-pik	See Ode to Gallantry (1989 TV series)
2002	Mainland China	Wu Jian, Zhou Li, Zhang Yanmin	See Ode to Gallantry (2002 TV series)
2017	Mainland China	Cai Yida, Jenny Zhang, Li Jingyang	See Ode to Gallantry (2017 TV series)
