= Zha Shenxing =

Qing dynasty poet (1650–1727)

- 查慎行
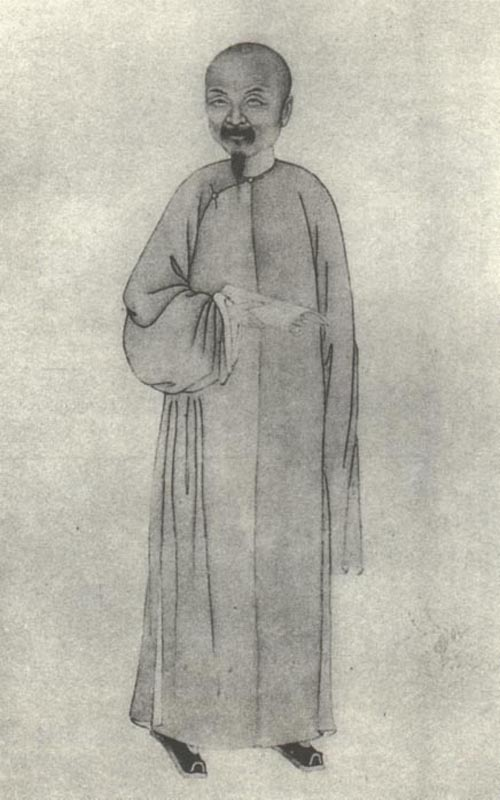
- Zha Shenxing
- Born: June 7, 1650; Haining, Zhejiang, Qing dynasty
- Died: September 25, 1727 (aged 77); Haining, Zhejiang, Qing dynasty
- Occupation: Poet
- Relatives: Zha Sixun; Zha Siting

Chinese name
- Chinese: 查慎行
Transcriptions
Standard Mandarin
- Hanyu Pinyin: Zhā Shènxíng

Zha Silian
- Traditional Chinese: 查嗣璉
- Simplified Chinese: 查嗣琏
Transcriptions
Standard Mandarin
- Hanyu Pinyin: Zhā Sìlián

Xiachong
- Chinese: 夏重
Transcriptions
Standard Mandarin
- Hanyu Pinyin: Xiàchóng

Huiyu
- Chinese: 悔余
Transcriptions
Standard Mandarin
- Hanyu Pinyin: Huǐyú

Zha Tian
- Chinese: 查田
Transcriptions
Standard Mandarin
- Hanyu Pinyin: Zhā Tiaán

Tashan
- Chinese: 他山
Transcriptions
Standard Mandarin
- Hanyu Pinyin: Tāshān

Zha Shenxing (Chinese: 查慎行; 7 June 1650 – 25 September 1727) was a Chinese poet in the early Qing dynasty.

== Biography ==
Zha was born Zha Silian in 1650 in Haining, Zhejiang. He had two younger brothers, Zha Sixun and Zha Siting. In his early years, he studied Confucian Classics under Confucianist Huang Zongxi. At the age of 19, he became a student of Ye Boyin. At the age of 20, he began traveling around the country. In 1689, he was dismissed and sent home for involvement in the case of Hong Sheng. In 1703, he sat for the imperial examination and obtained the position of a Jinshi. He was assigned to the Hanlin Academy and the Southern Study. In 1727, his brother Zha Siting committed a literary inquisition, he was also arrested. Yongzheng Emperor knew that he was prudent and righteous, and intentionally let him return to his hometown. He died in the following year.
