= Jin Yong =

Chinese-language wuxia novelist (1924–2018)

The Honourable Jin Yong GBM OBE
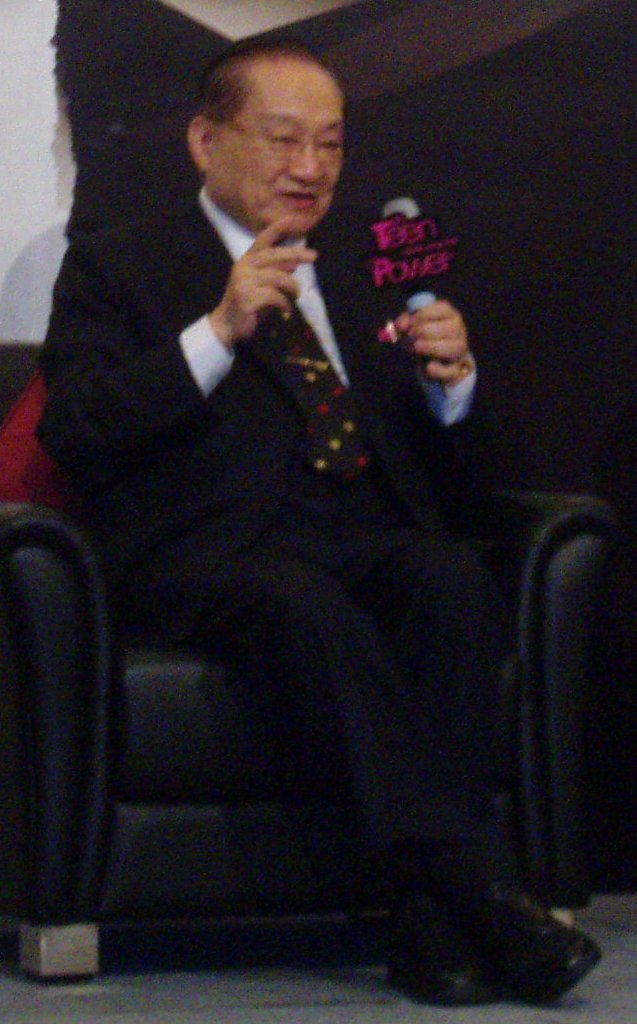
- Jin Yong in 2007
- Born: Zha Liangyong; 6 February 1924; Haining, Zhejiang, China
- Died: 30 October 2018 (aged 94); Hong Kong
- Resting place: Ngong Ping, Hong Kong
- Education: Soochow University; University of Cambridge; Peking University
- Occupations: Novelist; editor; businessman
- Spouses: Du Zhifen (m. 1948; div. 1953); Zhu Mei (m. 1953; div. 1976); Lin Leyi (m. 1976)
- Children: 4
- Writing career
- Pen name: Jin Yong
- Language: Chinese
- Period: 1955–1980, 1999-2007
- Genre: Wuxia

Chinese name
- Chinese: 金庸
Transcriptions
Standard Mandarin
- Hanyu Pinyin: Jīn Yōng
- Bopomofo: ㄐㄧㄣ ㄩㄥ
- Gwoyeu Romatzyh: Jin Iong
- Wade–Giles: Chin^{1} Yung^{1}
- IPA: [tɕín jʊ́ŋ]
Yue: Cantonese
- Yale Romanization: Gām Yùhng
- Jyutping: Gam1 Jung4
- IPA: [kɐm˥ jʊŋ˩]

Birth name
- Traditional Chinese: 查良鏞
- Simplified Chinese: 查良镛
Transcriptions
Standard Mandarin
- Hanyu Pinyin: Zhā Liángyōng
- Bopomofo: ㄓㄚ ㄌㄧㄤˊㄩㄥ
- Gwoyeu Romatzyh: Ja Liangiong
- Wade–Giles: Cha^{1} Liang^{2}-yung^{1}
Yue: Cantonese
- Yale Romanization: Chàh Lèuhng Yùhng
- Jyutping: Caa4 Loeng4 Jung4
- Sidney Lau: Cha4 Leung4 Yung4
- Website: www.jinyong.com

Louis Cha Leung-yung GBM OBE (Chinese: 查良鏞; 6 February 1924 – 30 October 2018), better known by his pen name Jin Yong (Chinese: 金庸), was a Chinese wuxia novelist and co-founder of Hong Kong newspaper Ming Pao. Cha authored 15 novels between 1955 and 1972 and became one of the most popular Chinese writers of all time, with over 100 million copies sold globally—excluding widespread pirated editions. Cha's novels, which have been adapted into numerous TV dramas, films, and video games, are esteemed for their literary quality and universal appeal, resonating with both scholarly and popular audiences.

== Early life ==
Born on 10 March 1924, in Haining, Zhejiang in Republican China, Cha was named Zha Liangyong (Cha Liang-yung) and is the second of seven children. He hailed from the scholarly Zha clan of Haining (海寧查氏), whose members included notable literati of the late Ming and early Qing dynasties such as Zha Jizuo (1601–1676), Zha Shenxing (1650–1727) and Zha Siting (查嗣庭; died 1727). His grandfather, Zha Wenqing (查文清), obtained the position of a tong jinshi chushen (third class graduate) in the imperial examination during the Qing dynasty. His father, Zha Shuqing (查樞卿), was arrested and executed by the Communist government for allegedly being a counterrevolutionary during the Campaign to Suppress Counterrevolutionaries in the early 1950s. Zha Shuqing was later posthumously declared innocent in the 1980s.

Zha Shuqing used to read him excerpts from the wuxia Huangjiang Nüxia (荒江女侠; "Woman Warrior of the Wild River") by Gu Mingdao (顧明道) every day, which aroused Cha's strong interest in the genre. Later, Cha took the initiative to read other works like Water Margin and The Seven Heroes and Five Gallants, which laid the foundation of his future as a wuxia novelist.

In 1937, Cha studied at Jiaxing No. 1 Middle School. In 1938, the Japanese army invaded Zhejiang, and the Jiaxing Middle School had to move hundreds of miles south to Lishui city in order to survive. Cha, as one of the students, only carried a quilt and a change of clothes, and the students had to trek on foot for 60 to 70 miles a day.

Cha was later expelled in 1941 after he wrote an article called "Alice's Adventures" which satirized the training director sent by the Kuomintang for being vicious towards the students. Cha later reflected on this period as one of the most significant crises in his life. The expulsion not only deprived him of the opportunity to pursue his studies but he suddenly faced the issue of finding food and accommodation. Fortunately, with assistance from the principal, Zhang Yintong, Cha resumed his high school education at Quzhou No. 1 Secondary School and graduated in 1943.

== Education ==
Cha was admitted to the Department of Foreign Languages at the Central University of Political Affairs in Chongqing. Cha later dropped out of the school. He took the entrance exam and gained admission to the Faculty of Law at Soochow University, where he majored in international law with the intention of pursuing a career in the foreign service.

In 2005, Cha applied at the University of Cambridge for a doctorate in Asian Studies, which he obtained in 2010. In 2009, Cha enrolled in another doctoral program in Chinese literature at Peking University but never graduated.

== Career ==
Cha was a journalist. To help support his studies, he began work in 1947 as a journalist and translator for the Ta Kung Pao newspaper in Shanghai. He moved to Hong Kong in 1948 to work for the paper's office in the city. When Cha was transferred to New Evening Post (of British Hong Kong) as Deputy Editor, he met Chen Wentong, who wrote his first wuxia novel under the pseudonym "Liang Yusheng" in 1953. Chen and Cha became good friends and it was under the former's influence that Cha began work on his first serialised martial arts novel, The Book and the Sword, in 1955. In 1957, while still working on wuxia serialisations, he quit his previous job and worked as a scenarist-director and scriptwriter at Great Wall Movie Enterprises Ltd and Phoenix Film Company.

In 1959, Cha co-founded the Hong Kong newspaper Ming Pao with his high school classmate Shen Baoxin (沈寶新). Cha served as its editor-in-chief for years, writing both serialised novels and editorials, amounting to some 10,000 Chinese characters per day. His novels also earned him a large readership. Cha completed his last wuxia novel in 1972, after which he officially retired from writing novels, and spent the remaining years of that decade editing and revising his literary works instead. The first complete definitive edition of his works appeared in 1979. In 1980, Cha wrote a postscript to Wu Gongzao's tai chi classic Wujia Taijiquan, where he described influences from as far back as Laozi and Zhuang Zhou on contemporary Chinese martial arts.

By then, Cha's wuxia novels had gained great popularity in Chinese-speaking areas. All of his novels have since been adapted into films, TV shows and radio dramas in Hong Kong, Taiwan and China. The important characters in his novels are so well known to the public that they can be alluded to with ease in all three regions.

In the late 1970s, Cha was involved in Hong Kong politics. After Deng Xiaoping, a Jin Yong fan, came to power and initiated the reform and opening-up process, Cha became the first non-Communist Hong Konger to meet with Deng. He was a member of the Hong Kong Basic Law drafting committee but resigned in protest after the 1989 Tiananmen Square protests and massacre. He was also part of the Preparatory Committee set up in 1996 by the Chinese government to monitor the 1997 transfer of sovereignty.

In 1993, Cha prepared for retirement from editorial work and sold all his shares in Ming Pao.

The asteroid 10930 Jinyong (1998 CR_{2}) has been named after him.

== Personal life ==
Cha's parents were Zha Shuqing (查樞卿) and Xu Lu (徐祿). He had four brothers and two sisters, and was the second oldest among the seven of them. His brothers were Zha Liangjian (查良鏗; 1916–1988), Zha Lianghao (查良浩; b. 1934), Zha Liangdong (查良棟; fl. 1930s) and Zha Liangyu (查良鈺; b. 1936). His sisters were Zha Liangxiu (查良琇; b. 1926) and Zha Liangxuan (查良璇; 1928–2002). His cousin was educator and philanthropist Cha Liang-chao (查良釗: 1897 – 1982).

Cha married three times. His first wife was Du Zhifen (杜治芬), whom he married in 1948 but divorced later. In 1953, he married his second wife, Zhu Mei (朱玫), a newspaper journalist. They had two sons and two daughters: Zha Chuanxia (查傳俠), Zha Chuanti (查傳倜), Zha Chuanshi (查傳詩) and Zha Chuanne (查傳訥). Cha divorced Zhu in 1976 and married his third wife, Lin Leyi (林樂怡; b. 1953), who was 29 years his junior and 16 years old when they first met. In 1976, his son Zha Chuanxia, then 19 years old, committed suicide after a quarrel with his girlfriend while studying at Columbia University.

== Death ==
On 30 October 2018, Cha died after a long illness at the Hong Kong Sanatorium & Hospital in Happy Valley, Hong Kong, aged 94.

His funeral service was held privately at Hong Kong Funeral Home in Quarry Bay on 13 November 2018 with his family and friends, with well known figures including writers Ni Kuang, Chua Lam, Chip Tsao, Benny Lee, producer Zhang Jizhong, actor Huang Xiaoming, former President of the Hong Kong Polytechnic University Poon Chung-kwong, image designer Tina Liu, politicians Tung Chee-hwa and Edward Leong, and founder of Alibaba Group Jack Ma among them in attendance.

At noon, his coffin was moved to Po Lin Monastery at Ngong Ping, Lantau Island, where he was cremated and his ashes was interred at the Hoi Wui Tower's columbarium.

== Decorations and conferments ==
Small documentary on Jin Yong 100th anniversary. China News Service. (In Chinese).

In addition to his wuxia novels, Cha also wrote many non-fiction works on Chinese history. For his achievements, he received many honours.

Cha was made an Officer of the Order of the British Empire (OBE) by the British government in 1981. He was made a Chevalier de la Légion d'Honneur (1992) and a Commandeur de l'Ordre des Arts et des Lettres (2004) by the French government.

Cha was also an honorary professor at Peking University, Zhejiang University, Nankai University, Soochow University, Huaqiao University, National Tsing Hua University, Hong Kong University (Department of Chinese Studies), the University of British Columbia, and Sichuan University. Cha was an honorary doctor at National Chengchi University, Hong Kong University (Department of Social Science), Hong Kong Polytechnic University, the Open University of Hong Kong, the University of British Columbia, Soka University and the University of Cambridge. He was also an honorary fellow of St Antony's College, Oxford and Robinson College, Cambridge, and a Waynflete Fellow of Magdalen College, Oxford.

When receiving his honorary doctorate at the University of Cambridge in 2004, Cha expressed his wish to be a full-time student at Cambridge for four years to attain a non-honorary doctorate. In July 2010, Cha earned his Doctor of Philosophy in oriental studies (Chinese history) at St John's College, Cambridge with a thesis on imperial succession in the early Tang dynasty.

== Works ==
Cha wrote a total of 16 fictional works, of which only one is a non-wuxia autobiographical short story (Yue Yun). His wuxia works are made up of a novella (Blade-dance of the Two Lovers), a standalone novel (White Horse Neighs in the Western Wind), 12 interconnected novels of varying lengths, and a very weakly connected novelette ("Sword of the Yue Maiden"). Most of his novels were first published in daily instalments in newspapers, then later in 3 authorised book editions each with various changes to the plots and the characters. There are 4 editions of his novels:

1. Serialised newspaper/magazine version (1955–1972)
2. Old edition/1st edition (book form) (1956–1972)
3. Revised edition/2nd edition (c.1970-1980)
4. New Revised edition/3rd edition/Century edition (1999–2006)

The works are:

=== Standalone ===
English title	Chinese title (Note: Click to sort in order of the first-character couplet "飛雪連天射白鹿 笑書神俠倚碧鴛".)	Date of first publication	First published publication	Character count
Blade-dance of the Two Lovers	鴛鴦刀	1 May 1961 – 31 May 1961	Ming Pao	34,000
White Horse Neighs in the Western Wind	白馬嘯西風	16 October 1961 – 10 January 1962	Ming Pao	67,000
Yue Yun	月雲	2000	Harvest Magazine	4,990

=== Series ===
Serial Number	English title	Chinese title (Note: Click to sort in order of the first-character couplet "飛雪連天射白鹿 笑書神俠倚碧鴛".)	Date of first publication	First published publication	Character count
11	The Book and the Sword	書劍恩仇錄	8 February 1955 – 5 September 1956	New Evening Post	513,000
08	Sword Stained with Royal Blood	碧血劍	1 January 1956 – 31 December 1956	Hong Kong Commercial Daily	488,000
03	The Legend of the Condor Heroes	射鵰英雄傳	1 January 1957 – 19 May 1959	Hong Kong Commercial Daily	918,000
13	Fox Volant of the Snowy Mountain	雪山飛狐	9 February 1959 – 18 June 1959	New Evening Post	130,000
04	The Return of the Condor Heroes	神鵰俠侶	20 May 1959 – 5 July 1961	Ming Pao	979,000
12	The Young Flying Fox	飛狐外傳	11 January 1960 – 6 April 1962	Wuxia and History (武俠與歷史)	439,000
05	The Heaven Sword and Dragon Saber	倚天屠龍記	6 July 1961 – 2 September 1963	Ming Pao	956,000
02	Demi-Gods and Semi-Devils	天龍八部	3 September 1963 – 27 May 1966	Ming Pao and Nanyang Siang Pau	1,211,000
10	A Deadly Secret	連城訣	12 January 1964 – 28 February 1965	Southeast Asia Weekly (東南亞周刊)	229,000
07	Ode to Gallantry	俠客行	11 June 1966 – 19 April 1967	Ming Pao	364,000
06	The Smiling, Proud Wanderer	笑傲江湖	20 April 1967 – 12 October 1969	Ming Pao and Shin Min Daily News	979,000
09	The Deer and the Cauldron	鹿鼎記	24 October 1969 – 23 September 1972	Ming Pao and Shin Min Daily News	1,230,000
01	Sword of the Yue Maiden	越女劍	1 January 1970 – 31 January 1970	Ming Pao evening supplement	16,000

=== Connections between the works ===
All of Jin Yong's novels, except White Horse Neighs in the Western Wind are connected, some strongly and some very weakly.

Aqing, the protagonist of the novelette "Sword of the Yue Maiden" is the ancestor of Han Xiaoying from The Legend of the Condor Heroes. Demi-Gods and Semi-Devils is a prequel; the Northern Beggar of the 5 Greats, Hong Qigong learns martial arts from Xu Zhu and succeeds Qiao Feng as the new chief of the Beggars' Gang in The Legend of the Condor Heroes and Duan Yu is the ancestor of the historical character Duan Zhixing who later becomes Reverend Yideng, another member of the 5 Greats. The Legend of the Condor Heroes, The Return of the Condor Heroes and The Heaven Sword and Dragon Saber make up the Condor Trilogy (considered by many to be Cha's magnum opus) and must be read in that order. Dugu Qiubai's Heavy Iron Sword is used by Yang Guo and broken down to create the Heaven-Reliant Sword and the Dragon-Slaying Sabre. Guo Xiang inherits the Heaven-Reliant Sword and passes it to her successors in the Emei School. Linghu Chong from The Smiling, Proud Wanderer learns Dugu Qiubai's 9 Swords of Dugu from Feng Qingyang, a reclusive Mount Hua School swordsman. The arrogant leader of the Snowy Mountain sect, Bai Zizai boastfully claims that his martial arts prowess surpasses even that of Zhang Sanfeng, the legendary founder of the still influential Wudang sect in the Ode to Gallantry and the Mount Hua sect had fallen from grace that it had after the events of The Smiling, Proud Wanderer. Some characters and schools from The Smiling, Proud Wanderer are mentioned in the Sword Stained with Royal Blood. In a very brief inner monologue in The Deer and the Cauldron, Chengguan, a knowledgeable but naïve Shaolin monk ponders two great swordsmen in the past who performed swordplay, following no defined stances: Dugu Qiubai and Linghu Chong. A few major characters from Sword Stained with Royal Blood also appear as minor characters. Wu Liuqi, a historical character from The Deer and the Cauldron is mentioned in the 3rd edition of A Deadly Secret as the martial arts master of Mei Niansheng. Numerous characters from The Book and the Sword appear in The Young Flying Fox including Chen Jialuo. Hu Yidao, Miao Renfeng, Tian Guinong, and the Feng family in The Young Flying Fox are the fictional descendants of the 4 bodyguards of Li Zicheng who appears in the Sword Stained with Royal Blood and The Deer and the Cauldron. The Fox Volant of the Snowy Mountain is the sequel to The Young Flying Fox.

The weakest connections are between The Smiling, Proud Wanderer, Ode to Gallantry, and the Sword Stained with Royal Blood, which is by mentions of certain characters and the appearance of major martial arts sects only.

Many people consider the novelette "Sword of the Yue Maiden", the novels Demi-Gods and Semi-Devils, the Condor Trilogy, and The Smiling, Proud Wanderer to be one complete series and the Sword Stained with Royal Blood, The Deer and the Cauldron, A Deadly Secret, The Book and the Sword, The Young Flying Fox, and the Fox Volant of the Snowy Mountain to be another complete series while considering Ode to Gallantry to be a standalone novel. Although no timeline is mentioned in either of the two works, the standalone novel Mandarin Duck Blades can be placed during the reign of the Yongzheng Emperor and the White Horse Neighs in the Western Wind can be placed during the early reign of the Qianlong Emperor by analysing the events occurring in the two works. The non-wuxia short story Yue Yun (Moon Cloud) is set in the early 1930s.

Among his novels, Demi-Gods and Semi-Devils, the Condor Trilogy, and The Deer and the Cauldron are considered his most well-plotted masterpieces.

=== Couplet ===
After Cha completed all his works, it was discovered that the first characters of the first 14 titles can be joined to form a couplet (duilian) with 7 characters on each line:

Traditional Chinese

飛雪連天射白鹿
笑書神俠倚碧鴛

Simplified Chinese

飞雪连天射白鹿
笑书神侠倚碧鸳

Loose translation

Shooting a white deer, snow flutters around the skies;
Smiling, [one] writes about the divine chivalrous one, leaning against bluish lovebirds (or lover)

Cha stated that he had never intended to create the couplet. The couplet serves primarily as a handy mnemonic to remember all of Cha's works for his fans.

- "Sword of the Yue Maiden" was left out because it would be an odd number, thus the couplet would not be complete, also because the "Sword of the Yue Maiden" was so short it was not even considered a book.

=== Editions ===
Most of Cha's works were initially published in installments in Hong Kong newspapers, most often in Ming Pao. The Return of the Condor Heroes was his first novel serialised in Ming Pao, launched on 20 May 1959. Between 1970 and 1980, Cha revised all of his works. The revised works of his stories are known as the "New Edition" (新版), also known as "Revised Edition" (修訂版), in contrast with the "Old Edition" (舊版), which refers to the original, serialised versions. Some characters and events were written out completely, most notably mystical elements and 'unnecessary' characters, such as the "Blood Red Bird" (小紅鳥) and "Qin Nanqin" (秦南琴), the mother of Yang Guo in the first edition.

In Taiwan, the situation is more complicated, as Cha's books were initially banned. As a result, there were multiple editions published underground, some of which were revised beyond recognition. Only in 1979 was Cha's complete collection published by Taiwan's Yuenching Publishing House (遠景出版社).

In China, the Wulin (武林) magazine in Guangzhou was the first to officially publish Cha's works, starting from 1980. Cha's complete collection in Simplified Chinese was published by Beijing's SDX Joint Publishing in 1994. Meanwhile, Mingheshe Singapore-Malaysia (明河社星馬分公司) published his collection, in Simplified Chinese for Southeast Asian readers in 1995.

From 1999 to 2006, Cha revised his novels for the second and last time. Each of his works was carefully revised, re-edited and re-issued in the order in which he wrote them. This revision was completed in spring 2006, with the publication of the last novel, The Deer and the Cauldron. The newer revised edition, known variably as the "New Century Edition" (世紀新修版), "New Revised Edition" (新修版) and "New New Edition" (新新版), is noted for its annotations where Cha answers previous criticisms directed at the historical accuracy of his works. In the newer revision, certain characters' personae were changed, such as Wang Yuyan, and many martial art skills and places have their names changed. This edition faced a number of criticisms from Cha's fans, some of whom prefer the older storyline and names. The older 1970–80 "New Edition" (新版) is no longer issued by Cha's publisher Mingheshe (明河社). In mainland China, it is re-issued as "Langsheng, Old Edition" (朗聲舊版) in simplified Chinese characters.

=== Patriotism, jianghu and development of heroism ===
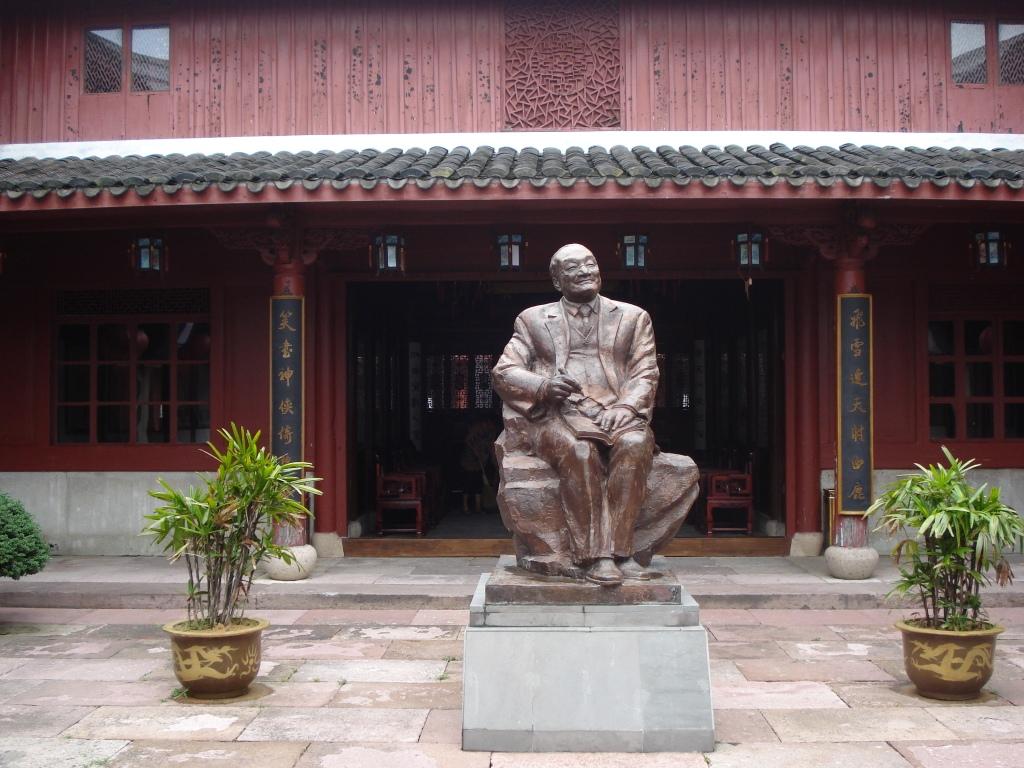
Statue of Cha on Taohua Island, Zhejiang Province

Chinese nationalism or patriotism is a strong theme in Cha's works. In most of his works, Cha places emphasis on the idea of self-determination and identity, and many of his novels are set in time periods when China was occupied or under the threat of occupation by non-Han Chinese peoples such as the Khitans, Jurchens, Mongols and Manchus. However, Cha gradually evolved his Chinese nationalism into an inclusionist concept which encompasses all present-day non-Han Chinese minorities. Cha expresses a fierce admiration for positive traits of non-Han Chinese people personally, such as the Mongols and Manchus. In The Legend of the Condor Heroes, for example, he casts Genghis Khan and his sons as capable and intelligent military leaders against the corrupt and ineffective bureaucrats of the Han Chinese-led Song dynasty.

Cha's references range from traditional Chinese medicine, acupuncture, martial arts, music, calligraphy, weiqi, tea culture, philosophical schools of thought such as Confucianism, Buddhism and Taoism and imperial Chinese history. Historical figures often intermingle with fictional ones, making it difficult for the layperson to distinguish which are real.

His works show a great amount of respect and approval for traditional Chinese values, especially Confucian ideals such as the proper relationship between ruler and subject, parent and child, elder sibling and younger sibling, and (particularly strongly, due to the wuxia nature of his novels), between master and apprentice, and among fellow apprentices. However, he also questions the validity of these values in the face of a modern society, such as ostracism experienced by his two main characters – Yang Guo's romantic relationship with his teacher Xiaolongnü in The Return of the Condor Heroes. Cha also places a great amount of emphasis on traditional values such as face and honour.

In all but his 14th work, The Deer and the Cauldron, the protagonists or heroes are explored meticulously through their relationships with their teachers, their immediate kin and relatives, and with their suitors or spouses. In each, the heroes have attained the zenith in martial arts and most would be the epitome or embodiment of the traditional Chinese values in words or deeds, i.e. virtuous, honourable, respectable, gentlemanly, responsible, patriotic, and so forth.

In The Deer and the Cauldron, Cha departed from his usual writing style, creating in its main protagonist Wei Xiaobao an antihero who is greedy, lazy, and utterly disdainful of traditional rules of propriety. Cha intentionally created an anticlimax and an antihero possessing none of the desirable traditional values and no knowledge of any form of martial arts, and dependent upon a protective vest made of alloy to absorb full-frontal attack when in trouble and a dagger that can cut through anything. Wei is a street urchin and womanizer and seems to have no positive qualities based on a superficial assessment; but he actually embodies the same essential qualities of the heroes from Cha's earlier novels. The fiction writer Ni Kuang wrote a critique of all of Cha's works and concluded that Cha concluded his work with The Deer and the Cauldron as a satire to his earlier work and to restore a balanced perspective in readers.

=== Criticisms ===
The study of Cha's works has spun off a specific area of study and discussion: Jinology. For years, readers and critics have written works discussing, debating and analysing his fictional world of martial arts; among the most famous are those by Cha's close friend and science fiction novelist, Ni Kuang. Ni was a fan of Cha, and has written a series of criticisms analysing the various personalities and aspects of his books called I Read Jin Yong's Novels (我看金庸小說).

Despite Cha's popularity, some of his novels were banned outside of Hong Kong due to political reasons. A number of them were outlawed in the People's Republic of China in the 1970s as they were thought to be satires of Mao Zedong and the Cultural Revolution; others were banned in Taiwan as they were thought to be in support of the Chinese Communist Party. None of these bans are currently in force, and Cha's complete collection has been published multiple times in mainland China, Hong Kong and Taiwan. Many politicians on both sides of the Straits are known to be readers of his works; Deng Xiaoping, for example, was a well-known reader himself.

In late 2004, the People's Education Publishing House (人民教育出版社) of the People's Republic of China sparked controversy by including an excerpt from Demi-Gods and Semi-Devils in a new senior high school Chinese textbook. While some praised the inclusion of popular literature, others feared that the violence and unrealistic martial arts described in Cha's works were unsuitable for high school students. At about the same time, Singapore's Ministry of Education announced a similar move for Chinese-learning students at secondary and junior college levels.

== Timeline ==
Era	Dynasty	Novel
5th century BC	Eastern Zhou (Late Spring and Autumn period)	01. The Sword of the Yue Maiden (越女劍)
11th century	Northern Song	02. Demi-Gods and Semi-Devils (天龍八部)
13th century	Southern Song	03. The Legend of the Condor Heroes (射鵰英雄傳); 04. The Return of the Condor Heroes (神鵰俠侶)
14th century	Late Yuan	05. The Heaven Sword and Dragon Saber (倚天屠龍記)
16th century	Ming	06. The Smiling, Proud Wanderer (笑傲江湖); 07. Ode to Gallantry (俠客行)
17th century	Late Ming	08. The Sword Stained With Royal Blood (碧血劍)
17th century	Early Qing	09. The Deer and the Cauldron (鹿鼎記); 10. A Deadly Secret (連城訣)
18th century	Mid-Qing	Blade-dance of the Two Lovers (鴛鴦刀); White Horse Neighs in the Western Wind (白馬嘯西風); 11. The Book and the Sword (書劍恩仇錄); 12. The Young Flying Fox (飛狐外傳); 13. Fox Volant of the Snowy Mountain (雪山飛狐)
1930s	The Republic of China	Yue Yun (Moon Cloud) (月雲)

== Translations ==
Official English translations currently available include:

03. The Legend of the Condor Heroes (2018–2021; four volumes) – published by MacLehose Press (an imprint of Quercus Publishing), translated by Anna Holmwood, Gigi Chang, and Shelly Bryant. The volumes are titled A Hero Born, A Bond Undone, A Snake Lies Waiting, and A Heart Divided.

04. The Return of the Condor Heroes (2023–ongoing) – published by MacLehose Press (an imprint of Quercus Publishing), translated by Gigi Chang. The first volume is titled A Past Unearthed.

09. The Deer and the Cauldron (1997–2002; abridged in three volumes only 28 chapters) – published by Oxford University Press, translated by John Minford.

11. The Book and the Sword (2005) – published by Oxford University Press, 2005, translated by Graham Earnshaw, edited by John Minford and Rachel May.

13. Fox Volant of the Snowy Mountain (1996) – published by Chinese University Press, translated by Olivia Mok.

== Adaptations ==
There are over 90 films and TV shows adapted from Cha's wuxia novels, including King Hu's The Swordsman (1990) and its sequel Swordsman II (1992), Wong Jing's 1992 films Royal Tramp and Royal Tramp II, and Wong Kar-wai's Ashes of Time (1994). Dozens of role-playing video games are based on Cha's novels, including Heroes of Jin Yong.

Cha's works have also been adapted to comics and television. Those available in English include:

- The Heaven Sword and Dragon Saber – in comic book form by Ma Wing-shing, published by ComicsOne
- The Legendary Couple – in comic book form by Tony Wong, published by ComicsOne
- The Return of the Condor Heroes – in comic book form by Wee Tian Beng, published by Asiapac Books
- Laughing in the Wind – DVD collection of the 2001 CCTV series with English subtitles released in the United States.

== As film director ==
Jin Yong co-directed 2 films produced by Hong Kong's Great Wall Movie Enterprises. In both films he is credited as Cha Leung-yung, his official name in Hong Kong.

Year	English title	Chinese title	Notes
1958	The Nature of Spring	有女懷春	Co-directed with Cheng Bugao, also writer
1960	Bride Hunter	王老虎搶親	Co-directed with Woo Siu-fung, Yue opera film

== See also ==
- Gu Long
- Woon Swee Oan
