= Sammo Hung filmography =

Performances by Hong Kong actor

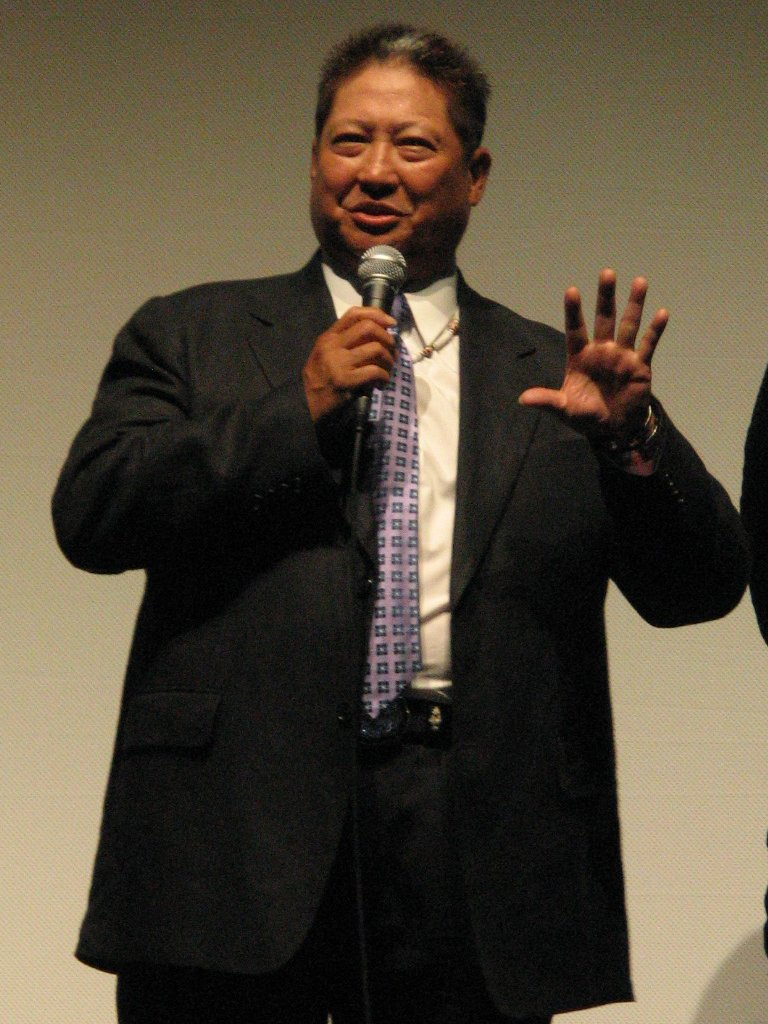
Sammo Hung in 2005

This article contains the filmography of Hong Kong actor Sammo Hung.

== Films ==
Year	Film title	Chinese title	Role	Notes
1961	Education of Love	愛的教育	He Shuang-chuan, a.k.a. Shouquan	Child actor
1962	Big and Little Wong Tin Bar	大小黄天霸		Child actor Film missing, rediscovered in 2016, when a full copy was released onto YouTube
1962	The Birth of Yue Fei	岳飛出世		Child actor
1962	The Princess and the Seven Little Heroes	公主與七小俠		Child actor
1962	Little Dragon Girl Teases White Snake Spirit	小龍女三戯白蛇精		Child actor
1963	Father and Son	人之初		Child actor a.k.a. 父子情
1963	The Monkey Soldiers Come to the Rescue	猴子兵華山救駕		Child actor
1964	The Crisis	生死關頭		Child actor
1964	The Rainbow Pass	虹霓關		Child actor
1966	The Eighteen Darts (Part 1)	兩湖十八鏢 (下集)		Child actor a.k.a. Seven Little Tigers (Part 1)
1966	The Eighteen Darts (Part 2)	兩湖十八鏢 (上集)		Child actor a.k.a. Seven Little Tigers (Part 2)
1966	Come Drink with Me	大醉俠		Assistant action director
1967	Paragon of Sword and Knife	天劍絶刀		Stuntman
1967	Dragon Gate Inn	龍門客桟		Supporting role a.k.a. Dragon Inn
1968	The Bells of Death	奪魂鈴	Tao's thug	
1968	Black Butterfly	女侠黒蝴蝶		Supporting role
1968	Paragon of Sword and Knife Part II	天劍絶刀 (下集大結局)		Stuntman
1968	The Jade Raksha	玉羅刹	Master Yan's thug	Extra
1968	Death Valley	斷魂谷	Swordsman	Extra
1969	Raw Courage	虎胆		Supporting role
1969	Mad, Mad Sword	神經刀	Mopan Bandit	a.k.a. Mad Mad Mad Swords
1969	Dragon Swamp	毒龍潭	Gambler at Jiang's party	
1969	The Swordmates	燕娘		Supporting role
1969	The Golden Sword	龍門金劍	Golden Dragon Security member	Stuntman; Also action director
1969	The Sweet Sword	一劍香		Supporting role a.k.a. The Fragrant Sword
1969	Killers Five	豪侠傳		Supporting role
1969	The One Armed Magic Nun	獨臂神尼		Supporting role
1969	The Devil Warrior	小魔侠		Extra a.k.a. Little Devil
1969	Sword of Emei	峨嵋霸刀		Supporting role
1969	Vengeance Is a Golden Blade	飛燕金刀	Long's man	
1970	Wrath of the Sword	怒劍狂刀		Supporting role
1970	The Eagle's Claw	鷹爪手		Supporting role
1970	The Iron Buddha	鐵羅漢	Xiao's thug	Action director
1970	The Crimson Charm	血符門		Supporting role
1970	Brothers Five	五虎屠龍	Security escort Chu	Action director
1970	The Twelve Gold Medallions	十二金牌		Action director
1970	The Golden Knight	金衣大俠	Master Bao's thug	
1970	A Taste of Cold Steel	武林風雲	Tiger's Gang member	Extra; Also stuntman
1970	The Angry River	鬼怒川	Thug	Action director
1971	The Invincible Eight	天龍八將	Whip-wielding henchman	Action director
1971	A Touch of Zen	俠女	Commander Hsu's son	Action director
1971	The Shadow Whip	影子神鞭	Martial artist after Fang	
1971	The Comet Strikes	鬼流星		Supporting role
1971	Swordsman at Large	蕭十一郎	Bandit; Rapist	
1971	The Fast Sword	奪命金劍	Thug	Action director
1971	The Lady Hermit	鍾馗娘子	Black Demon's disciple	
1971	The Eunuch	鬼太監	First fighter at the final contest	
1971	The Living Sword	劍魂		Supporting role
1971	Six Assassins	六刺客		Stuntman
1971	The Lady Hermit	鍾馗娘子		Supporting role
1971	Vengeance of a Snowgirl	冰天侠女	Henchman	a.k.a. A Daughter's Vengeance
1971	The Blade Spares None	刀不留人		Supporting role Action director
1972	The Thunderbolt Fist	霹靂拳		Supporting role
1972	Trilogy of Swordsmanship	群英會		Supporting role This is an anthology film. Hung appears in Part 2: The Tigress.
1972	Lady Whirlwind	鐵掌旋風腿	Tiao Ta Niang's brother	Action director a.k.a. Deep Thrust a.k.a. Deep Thrust: The Hand of Death
1972	Bandits from Shantung	山東響馬	Bell thrower	Action director
1972	Hapkido	合氣道	Fan Wei, a.k.a. Bun Wei	Action director a.k.a. Lady Kung Fu
1972	The Fugitive	亡命徒		Supporting role
1972	The Devil's Mirror	風雷魔鏡	Witch's drummer	
1972	The Imperial Swordsman	大內高手		
1973	Life for Sale	賣命		Supporting role Action director a.k.a. That Man from Singapore
1973	The Rendezvous of Warriors	偸渡客		Extra; Stuntman
1973	Enter the Dragon	龍爭虎鬥	Shaolin fighter	Stunt co-ordinator Stuntman a.k.a. The Deadly Three
1973	The Fate of Lee Khan	迎春閣之風波		Action director
1973	Kickmaster	跆拳震九州		Supporting role Action director a.k.a. Sting of the Dragon Masters a.k.a. When Taekwondo Strikes
1973	Bloody Ring	死亡挑戰		Supporting role Action director aa.k.a. Mandarin Magician
1973	The Devil's Treasure	黑夜怪客	Kao Hsiung	Action director
1973	Ambush	埋伏		
1974	The Wandering Life	横衝直撞小福星		Supporting role
1974	Ultraman the Frozen Station	無敵超人		
1974	The Skyhawk	黃飛鴻少林拳	Fei Fei	Action director
1974	Village of Tigers	悪虎村		Supporting role
1974	The Tournament	中泰拳壇生死戰		Supporting role Action director
1974	The Association	艷窟神探		Supporting role Action director
1974	Big Brother	大佬		Stuntman
1974	Manchu Boxer	七省拳王	Hashimoto	Action director a.k.a. Bonecrushers
1974	Games Gamblers Play	鬼馬雙星		Action director
1974	Stoner	鐵金剛大破紫陽觀	Gang strongman	Action director a.k.a. The Shrine of Ultimate Bliss a.k.a. Hong Kong Hitman
1974	The Dragon Tamers	女子跆拳群英會		Supporting role a.k.a. Belles of Taekwondo
1975	The Man from Hong Kong	直搗黃龍	Win Chan	Action director a.k.a. The Dragon Flies
1975	Bruce, Hong Kong Master	香港超人		Supporting role a.k.a. Hong Kong Superman
1975	Winner Take All	面懵心精		Supporting role
1975	Story of Chinese Gods	封神榜		
1975	Kung Fu Stars	脂粉大彗星		Supporting role Action director
1975	The Valiant Ones	忠烈圖	Hakatatsu	Action director a.k.a. Usurpers of Emperor's Power
1975	All in the Family	花飛滿城春		Supporting role
1975	The Young Rebel	後生		Supporting role a.k.a. The Rebel Youth
1975	Bruce Lee, D-Day at Macao	生龍活虎小英雄		Supporting role a.k.a. 生龙活虎小英雄 a.k.a. Little Superman a.k.a. Fist of Vengeance
1975	My Wacky, Wacky World	大千世界		Supporting role
1976	The Himalayan	密宗聖手		Supporting role Action director
1976	Hand of Death	少林門	Officer Tu Ching	Action director a.k.a. Countdown in Kung Fu
1976	The Double Crossers	鬼計雙雄		Supporting role
1976	The Private Eyes	半斤八兩		Action director
1976	Traitorous	大太監	First Head	a.k.a. Shaolin Traitorous
1976	A Queen's Ransom	鱷潭群英會		Supporting role a.k.a. International Assassins
1976	End of Wicked Tigers	老虎彗星	Lau	Producer; Action director a.k.a. 猛虎鬥肥龍
1976	The Breakthrough	突圍		Supporting role Action director
1976	Tiger of Northland	北少林		Supporting role Action director a.k.a. 北地虎
1977	Fists of Dragons	追龍		Action director a.k.a. The Fighter with Two Faces
1977	Shaolin Plot	四大門派	Renegade Monk	Action director
1977	The Iron Fisted Monk	三德和尚与舂米六	Hawker	Director writer Action director
1977	Broken Oath	破戒	Henchman	
1977	The Dragon, the Odds	戇居仔與牛咁眼		Supporting role a.k.a. Crazy Boy and Pop-Eye
1978	Game of Death	死亡遊戲	Lo Chen	Action director
1978	My Darling Gals	出鐘		Supporting role a.k.a. 脂粉大彗星 a.k.a. Kung Fu Stars
1978	Return of Secret Rivals	臭頭小子	Su Yen-cheng	a.k.a. Filthy Guy a.k.a. Emperor of the Filthy Guy
1978	Warriors Two	贊先生與找錢華	Fei Chun	Director action director
1978	Dirty Tiger, Crazy Frog	老虎田雞	Frog	Producer; Action director
1978	Enter the Fat Dragon	肥龍過江	Lung	Director action direct
1978	The Amsterdam Kill	荷京喋血		Action director
1978	Gee and Gor	谷爆		Action director a.k.a. Gee and Jor
1978	Heroes	烏龍英雄		Stuntman
1978	Naked Comes the Huntress	貂女		Co-director; Action director
1978	Magnum Fist	大英雄	Japanese commander	
1979	Knockabout	雜家小子	Blinking beggar	Director; Action director
1979	The Incredible Kung Fu Master	醒目仔蠱惑招	Fei Jai	Action director a.k.a. The Kung Fu Master a.k.a. They Call Me Phat Dragon
1979	Magnificent Butcher	林世榮	Lam Sai-wing, a.k.a. Butcher Wing	Co-director; Action director
1979	Odd Couple	搏命單刀奪命搶	King of Sabres; Ah Yo (pupil of King of Spears)	Action director
1979	From Riches to Rags	錢作怪		Producer a.k.a. Money Talk
1980	Encounters of the Spooky Kind	鬼打鬼	Bold Cheung	Director; Co-writer; Action director a.k.a. Spooky Encounters
1980	Game of Death II	死亡塔		Co-director; Uncredited a.k.a. Tower of Death
1980	By Hook or by Crook	鹹魚番生	Fatso	
1980	Two Toothless Tigers	甩牙老虎	Ah Pao	Producer; Action director
1980	The Victim	身不由已	Chan Wing	Director; Action director
1981	The Prodigal Son	敗家仔	Wong Wah-bo	Director; Action director Co-writer a.k.a. Pull No Punches
1981	Chasing Girls	追女仔	Man at airport	Cameo; Producer
1982	Carry On Pickpocket	提防小手	Rice Pot	Director; Action director
1982	The Dead and the Deadly	人嚇人	Chu Wong-lee, a.k.a. Fat Boy	Producer; Co-writer; Action director
1982	Men's Inhumanity to Men			Director
1983	Project A	A計劃	Fei	Co-director action director a.k.a. Jackie Chan's Project A
1983	Winners and Sinners	奇謀妙計五福星	Teapot	Director; Producer action director Co-writer a.k.a. 5 Lucky Stars
1983	Zu Warriors from the Magic Mountain	新蜀山劍俠	Fat Man / Chang Mei	
1984	Pom Pom	神勇雙響炮	Eric / Kidstuff	Producer; Action director Cameo
1984	The Owl vs Bombo	貓頭鷹與小飛象	Bombo, a.k.a. First Day Chan	a.k.a. The Owl vs Bumbo; Director producer
1984	Possession of a Ghost	鬼符身		Director a.k.a. Five Fighters from Shaolin
1984	Wheels on Meals	快餐車	Moby	Director; Action director Stuntman a.k.a. Million Dollar Heiress
1984	Long Arm of the Law	省港旗兵		Producer
1984	Hong Kong 1941	等待黎明		Co-writer; Production supervisor Action director
1984	The Return of Pom Pom	雙龍出海		Producer; Action director
1984	Hocus Pocus	人嚇鬼		Producer
1985	My Lucky Stars	福星高照	Eric, a.k.a. Kidstuff, a.k.a. Fastbuck (US version)	Director; Action director a.k.a. Lucky Stars Superior Shine
1985	From the Great Beyond	時來運轉	Film director	Producer; Cameo a.k.a. Those Merry Souls
1985	Twinkle, Twinkle, Lucky Stars	夏日福星	Eric, a.k.a. Kidstuff, a.k.a. Fastbuck (US version)	Director producer Action director
1985	Yes, Madam	皇家師姐	Old master	Producer a.k.a. Police Assassins
1985	Heart of Dragon	龍的心	Dodo Fung, a.k.a. Danny (US version)	Director; Action director a.k.a. Heart of the Dragon a.k.a. The First Mission
1985	Mr. Boo Meets Pom Pom	智勇三寶		Producer
1985	The Island	生死綫		Producer a.k.a. Life and Death
1985	Mr. Vampire	彊屍先生		Producer
1985	It's a Drink! It's a Bomb!	聖誕奇遇結良縁		Producer a.k.a. Christmas Romance
1986	Millionaires Express	富貴列車	Ching Fong-tin	Director a.k.a. Shanghai Express
1986	Lucky Stars Go Places	最佳福星	Eric, a.k.a. Kidstuff	Producer; Co-writer a.k.a. The Luckiest Stars
1986	Where's Officer Tuba?	霹靂大喇叭	Officer Tuba	Producer a.k.a. Spirit and Me
1986	Mr. Vampire II	殭屍家族		Producer
1986	From Here to Prosperity	奪寶計上計		Producer
1986	The Strange Bedfellow	倆公婆八條心		Producer
1986	Silent Love	聽不到的説話		Producer
1986	Rosa	神勇雙響炮続続續集		Producer
1986	Goodbye Mama	再見媽 (口米)		Producer
1987	To Err Is Human	標錯參	Ting Siu-chung a.k.a. To Err Is Humane	
1987	My Cousin the Ghost	表哥到		Producer
1987	Eastern Condors	東方禿鷹	Tung Ming-sun	Director; Producer; Action director
1987	Promising Young Boy	全力反彈		Producer
1987	The Romance of Book and Sword	書劍恩仇錄		Action director
1987	Scared Stiff	小生夢驚魂		Producer a.k.a. Kid Dreams Thriller
1987	Project A Part II	A計劃續集	Fei	Cameo
1987	The Final Test	最後一戰		Producer
1987	Sworn Brothers	肝膽相照		Producer
1987	Mr. Vampire III	靈幻先生	Hung	Cameo producer Action director
1987	The Happy Bigamist	一屋兩妻		Producer
1988	Dragons Forever	飛龍猛將	Luke Wong Fei-fung	Director
1988	In the Blood	神探父子兵	Hung Kei	Cameo; Production supervisor Action director
1988	Painted Faces	七小福	Master Yu Jim-yuen	
1988	On the Run	亡命鴛鴦		Producer
1988	Lai Shi, China's Last Eunuch	中國最後一個太監	Opera boss	Producer a.k.a. Last Eunuch of China
1988	Paper Marriage	過埠新娘	Bo Chin	Action director
1988	Picture of a Nymph	畫中仙		Producer; Action director a.k.a. Portrait of a Nymph
1988	Mr. Vampire IV	彊屍叔叔		Producer
1988	Spooky, Spooky	鬼猛腳		Cameo; Director a.k.a. The Haunted Island
1988	One Husband Too Many	一妻兩夫		Producer
1989	Seven Warriors	忠義群英	"Hung"	Cameo; Director producer
1989	Blonde Fury	師姐大晒		Producer a.k.a. Born to Fight a.k.a. Above the Law II a.k.a. 師姐出馬
1989	Into the Fire	烈火街頭		Production supervisor
1989	Pedicab Driver	群龍戲鳳	Lo Tung, a.k.a. Fat Tung	Director; Production supervisor Action director co-writer
1989	The Fortune Code	富貴兵團	Brother Hung	a.k.a. Code of Fortune
1989	Bachelor's Swan Song	再見王老五		Cameo; Producer
1989	Burning Sensation	火燭鬼		Cameo; Producer
1990	Shanghai Encounter	亂世兒女	Chin Hung-yun	a.k.a. Shanghai Shanghai
1990	Encounters of the Spooky Kind 2	鬼咬鬼	Abao	Director; Production supervisor Action director
1990	Eight Taels of Gold	八兩金	Slim Cheng	
1990	Pantyhose Hero	脂粉雙雄	Jeff Lau	Director; Production supervisor a.k.a. Pantyhose Killer
1990	Skinny Tiger, Fatty Dragon	瘦虎肥龍	Fatty	a.k.a. Nutty Kickbox Cops
1990	Dragon Versus Phoenix	龍鳳賊捉賊		Cameo; Production supervisor a.k.a. Thief Versus Thief a.k.a. License to Steal
1990	Island of Fire	火燒島	Fatty Liu Hsi-chia, a.k.a. John (US version)	a.k.a. Island on Fire a.k.a. The Burning Island
1990	She Shoots Straight	皇家女將	Officer Huang Tsung-po (elder)	Producer a.k.a. Lethal Lady
1990	Best Is the Highest		Chok-fei	Director a.k.a. Best is Highest
1991	Touch and Go	一觸即發	Fat Goose	a.k.a. Point of No Return
1991	Lover's Tear	誓不忘情	Commissioner Kung	Production supervisor
1991	The Tantana	密宗威龍	Gai-lap	
1991	My Flying Wife	猛鬼入侵黑社會	Chan Yu-qun	
1991	Daddy, Father and Papa	老豆唔怕多	Bull	Action director
1991	The Gambling Ghost	洪福齊天	Fat Bao, a.k.a. Fatty/Big Brock (Bao's father)/Hung Gao (Bao's grandfather)	
1991	The Banquet	豪門夜宴	Hung Tai-po	a.k.a. Party of a Wealthy Family
1991	Bury Me High	衞斯理之覇王卸甲		Producer
1991	Slickers Vs. Killers	黐線枕邊人	Success Hung	Director; Producer
1992	Ghost Punting	五福星撞鬼	Eric, a.k.a. Kidstuff	Co-director
1992	Scorpion King	羯子戰士		Producer a.k.a. Operation Scorpio
1992	Painted Skin	畫皮之陰陽法王	High Monk Tai-yuet	Action director a.k.a. Human Night in Painted Skin
1992	Banana Spirit	精霊變 (驚慄档案之精靈變)		Production supervisor
1992	The Moon Warriors	戰神傳說		Director
1993	King Swindler	龍父虎子		a.k.a. Dragon Father and Tiger Son a.k.a. Return of the Fat Dragon
1993	Don't Call Me Gigolo	住家舞男		Co-director
1993	The Eagle Shooting Heroes	射鵰英雄傳之東成西就		Action director
1993	Kung Fu Cult Master	倚天屠龍記之魔教教主	Cheung Sam-fung	Co-director; Action director a.k.a. Evil Cult a.k.a. Lord of the Wu Tang a.k.a. Kung Fu Master
1993	Blade of Fury	一刀傾城	Yu Man-san	Cameo; Director; Action director a.k.a. 神州第一刀 a.k.a. China's First Swordsman
1994	Ashes of Time	東邪西毒		Action director
1994	Don't Give a Damn	冇面俾	"Pierre Lau"	Director; Producer; Stunt action director Production supervisor a.k.a. Burger Cop
1995	Thunderbolt	霹靂火		Action director
1996	Somebody Up There Likes Me	浪漫風暴	Black Jack Hung	
1996	How to Meet the Lucky Stars	運財五福星	Eric, a.k.a. Kidstuff/Tau (two roles)	
1996	The Stunt Woman	阿金的故事	Master Tung, a.k.a. Thunderbolt	a.k.a. Ah Kam
1997	Mr. Nice Guy	一個好人	Cyclist	Cameo; Director; Stuntman a.k.a. SuperChef
1997	A Chinese Ghost Story: The Tsui Hark Animation	小倩	White Cloud (voice)	a.k.a. Xiao Qian
1997	Once Upon a Time in China and America	黃飛鴻之西域雄獅		Cameo; Director; Action director a.k.a. Once Upon a Time in China and America
1997	Double Team			Action director
1998	Knock Off	KO 雷霆一擊		Action director 2nd unit director
1998	The Pale Sky	沒有小鳥的天空	Yan	
1999	No Problem	無問題	Himself	a.k.a. Yes, I Am Mr. Mountain
2001	The Legend of Zu	蜀山傳	White Eyebrows	a.k.a. Zu Warriors
2001	The Avenging Fist	拳神	Inspector Dark	a.k.a. Fight Zone
2002	The Hidden Enforcers	殺手狂龍	King	
2002	Flying Dragon, Leaping Tiger	龍騰虎躍	Lu Zheng-yang	a.k.a. Dragon Soaring, Tiger Leaping
2003	Men Suddenly in Black	大丈夫	Sammo Hung	Cameo
2003	The Medallion	飛龍再生		Action director
2004	Astonishing	驚心動魄	Director Ko	Cameo
2004	Around the World in 80 Days	環遊世界八十天	Wong Fei-hung	Cameo
2004	Kung Fu Hustle	功夫		Cameo; Action director
2004	Osaka Wrestling Restaurant	香港廚神	Gourmet chef	Cameo a.k.a. 大阪達一餐
2005	Legend of the Dragon	龍威父子	Dragon Ki	Action director
2005	Dragon Squad	猛龍	Kong Long	a.k.a. Dragon Heat
2005	SPL: Sha Po Lang	殺破狼	Wong Po	a.k.a. Kill Zone
2007	Twins Mission	雙子神偷	Uncle Luck	
2008	Fatal Move	奪帥	Lin Ho-lung	
2008	Three Kingdoms: Resurrection of the Dragon	三國志見龍卸甲	Luo Ping-an	Action director
2008	Wushu	武術	Li Kui	
2008	Ip Man	葉問		Action director a.k.a. The Legend of Yip Man a.k.a. 葉問傳 一代宗師葉問; Grandmaster Yip Man
2009	Kung Fu Chefs	功夫廚神	Wong Ping-yee	
2009	Howling Arrow	響箭		Director; Action director Delayed
2009	He Who Would Be King	王者		
2010	14 Blades	錦衣衛	Prince Qing	
2010	Ip Man 2	葉問2	Hung Chan-nam	Action director
2010	Detective Dee and the Mystery of the Phantom Flame	狄仁傑之通天帝國		Action director Art director
2010	The Legend is Born – Ip Man	葉問前傳	Chan Wah-shun	
2010	Paladin Du Xin Wu	大俠杜心五		
2010	Tieqiao San	鐵橋三		
2011	Choy Lee Fut	蔡李彿	Chan Tin-loi	a.k.a. Fight To Fight
2011	My Kingdom	大武生		Action director
2011	Road Less Traveled	樂之路	Mr. Lee	Producer; Presenter
2011	A Simple Life	桃姐	Director Hung	Cameo
2012	Naked Soldier	赤裸戰士	CK Long/Lung Chi-keung	
2012	The Last Tycoon	大上海	Hong Shouting	
2012	Tai Chi 0	太極之零開始		Action director
2012	Tai Chi Hero	太極2 英雄崛起		Action director
2013	Princess and the Seven Kung Fu Masters	笑功震武林	Lam Kwok-tung	
2013	The Wrath of Vajra			Action director
2014	Once Upon a Time in Shanghai	惡戰	Master Tie	
2014	Rise of the Legend	黃飛鴻之英雄有夢	Lui Kung	
2016	The Bodyguard	特工爺爺	Ting Fu	Director
2016	The Monkey King 2	西遊記之孫悟空三打白骨精		Action director
2016	Call of Heroes	危城	General on horse	Action director a.k.a. The Deadly Reclaim
2017	God of War	戰神戚繼光	Yu Dayou	
2017	Paradox	貪狼		Action director
2019	A Lifetime Treasure	如珠如寶	Fat Crab	
2022	Septet: The Story of Hong Kong	七人樂隊		Director; Screenwriter
2024	Twilight of the Warriors: Walled In	九龍城寨·圍城	Mr. Big	
2025	Back to the Past	尋秦記		Action director

== Television films ==
Year	Series title	Chinese title	Role	Notes
2003	Dragon Laws I: The Undercover	特警飛龍之一 – 臥底威龍	Police Officer Lung	a.k.a. Undercover Cop
2003	Dragon Laws II: Kidnapped	特警飛龍之二 – 大綁架	Police Officer Lung	
2003	Dragon Laws III: Smuggled Weapons	特警飛龍之三 – 走私軍火	Police Officer Lung	
2003	Dragon Laws IV: Weapon on Sale	特警飛龍之四 – 炸彈狂徒	Police Officer Lung	
2003	Dragon Laws V: Diamond Trades	特警飛龍之五 – 鑽石大盜	Police Officer Lung	a.k.a. Diamond Theft

== Television series ==
Year	Series title	Chinese title	Role	Channel	Notes
1986	Facial Reaction	三角錯愛		Hong Kong – TVB	TV comedian mini-play
1995	Master Huang	人海孤鴻	Wong Siu-wu	Taiwan	
1996	Taipei Love Story	台北愛情故事			
1998-2000	Martial Law	過江龍	Sammo Law	United States – CBS	
1999	Early Edition	早期版本	Sammo Law	United States – CBS	Season 3, episode 22: "Play It Again, Sammo"
1999	Pokémon Must Be Destroyed		Himself	United States – TheThreshold.com	QuickTime video, lost media
2000	Walker, Texas Ranger	沃克，德州骑警	Sammo Law	United States – CBS	Episode: "The Day of Cleansing: Part 2"
2002	The Valley of Lost Vengeance	断仇谷	Wan Bo-long	China	a.k.a. End Enmity Hollow
2005	Coming Lies	偸天換日	Cash's stepfather	Taiwan	a.k.a. Steal Day a.k.a. Steal Day in Inside
2006	Wing Chun	詠春	Wong Wah-bo	Hong Kong – TVB	
2008	The Shaolin Warriors	少林寺之僧兵传奇	Big Foot, a.k.a. Da-jiao Seng	China – CCTV	a.k.a. 少林僧兵
2008	The Disciple	龍的傳人	Guest judge	China – China Beijing TV Station	
2020	Deer Squad	无敌鹿战队	Rammy	China	Chinese version

== Documentaries ==
Year	Documentary title	Chinese title	Notes
1973	Bruce Lee: The Man and the Legend	李小龍的生與死	
1977	Bruce Lee, The Legend	李小龍傳奇	
1990	The Best of the Martial Arts Films	金裝武術電影大全	
1998	Cinema of Vengeance		
1998	Jackie Chan: My Story	成龍的傳奇	
1998	Bruce Lee: The Path of the Dragon		
2000	Bruce Lee: A Warrior's Journey	李小龍：勇士的旅程	a.k.a. 死亡遊戲之旅
2002	The Art of Action: Martial Arts in Motion Picture	功夫片歲月	
2002	Modern Warriors	演職員表	
2003	Swordfighting	刀光劍影	
2003	Cinema Hong Kong: Kung Fu	電影香江：功夫世家	a.k.a. Chop Socky: Cinema Hong Kong
2003	Red Trousers – The Life of the Hong Kong Stuntmen	紅褲子	Justin Fletcher
