= List of Hong Kong films of 1971 =

A list of films produced in Hong Kong in 1971:

== A-C ==
Title	Director	Cast	Genre	Notes
1971
The Ammunition Hunters	Ting Shan-hsi	Chen Chen, Peter Yang Kwan, Sun Yueh, Sit Hon, Shan Mao	Action	With Taiwan
The Angry River	Huang Feng	Angela Mao, Kao Yuan, Pai Ying, Chang I Fei, Chiang Nan, Feng Yi, Han Ying Chieh	Action	
The Anonymous Heroes	Chang Cheh	Chan Chuen, Kang-Yeh Cheng, Lei Cheng, Sing Chen, David Chiang, Ching Li	Action	
The Big Boss	Lo Wei	Bruce Lee, Maria Yi, James Tien, Yin-Chieh Han, Tony Liu	Action	Golden Harvest; Bruce Lee's first major film
Black and White Swordsman	Mo Man Hung	Kong Ban, Chan Hung Lit, Essie Lin Chia, Chiao Lin	Sword	
The Blade Spares None	Teddy Yip Wing Cho	Nora Miao, Patrick Tse Yin, James Tien, Paul Chang Chung, Feng Yi	Sword	Golden Harvest
Blood and Guts	Ho Wai Hung	Gai Ming, Hon Kong, Hong Hoi, Kong Ban, Kong Do, Lee I Min	Kung-Fu	
Blood of the Dragon	Kao Pao-shu	Jimmy Wang Yu, Lisa Chiao Chiao, Kong Ching Ha, Lung Fei, Miu Tin, Yee Yuen	Sword	Also known as The Desperate Chase
The Brave and the Evil	Jimmy Wang Yu	Chan San Yat, Paul Chang Chung, Feng Yi, Ho Wai Hung, Lee Kwan, Li Min Lang	Kung-Fu	
Bus Stop	John Law Ma	Zhu Mu, Pai Ying, Maggie Lee, Wong Sam, James Yi Lui	Action	
The Chase	Wong Tin Lam	Maria Yi, James Tien Chun, Gam Saan, Fong Sam, Wu Jiaxiang	Sword	Released in US as The Shanghai Killers
The Comet Strikes	Lo Wei	Nora Miao, Patrick Tse Yin, Lo Wei, Stanley Fung, Anthony Lau, Lee Kwan	Kung-Fu	Golden Harvest
The Crimson Charm	Huang Feng	Ivy Ling Po, Shih Szu, Chang Yi, Ku Feng, Wong Hap	Sword	Shaw Brothers

== D-F ==
Title	Director	Cast	Genre	Notes
The Deadly Duo	Chang Cheh	David Chiang, Ti Lung, Ku Feng, Wong Chung, Cheng Lui, Chan Sing, Lau Dan	Kung Fu/ Sword	
Deaf and Mute Heroine	Wu Ma	Tang Ching, Helen Ma, Wu Ma, Lee Ying, Paul Wei	Sword	
The Deceiver	Gam Sek	Chan Hung Lit, Pan Yin Tze, Ngok Yeung, Cho Kin, Chan Pooi Ling, Ou Wei, Cheung Gwong Chiu	Comedy	Dai Yat (First Films)
The Devilish Killer		Bik Cha Laai, Ching Ye, Chui Chung Hei, Gai Ming, Hsieh Hsing, Kong Ban	Kung-Fu	
The Duel	Chang Cheh	David Chiang, Ti Lung, Yue Wai, Yeung Chi Hing, Cheng Hong Yip	Kung Fu Triad	Shaw Brothers
Duel for Gold	Chor Yuen	Ivy Ling Po, Wang Ping, Chin Han	Martial Arts	
Duel of Fists	Chang Cheh	David Chiang, Ti Lung, Ching Miao, Ku Feng, Ching Li	Thai boxing drama	Shot in Bangkok
The Eight Dragon Sword	Gam Sing Yan	Chan Hung Lit, Cheung Yan Git, Gam Man Hei, Ho Wai Hung, Hsieh Hsing	Sword	With Taiwan
Eight Immortals	Chan Hung Man		Fantasy	With Taiwan
The Eunuch	Teddy Yip Wing Cho	Pai Ying, Lisa Chiao Chiao, Tsung Wa, Meng Chia, James Tien, Yuk-Yi Yung	Action	Shaw Brothers
Everything Is Going My Way	Liu Cheung Hung	Got Siu Bo, Gua Ah-leh, Ngok Yeung, Wong Mok Sau, Yee Hung	Comedy	With Taiwan
Extreme Enemy	Kim Lung	Cheung Ching Ching	Kung-fu	
The Fast Sword	Huang Feng	Chang Yi, Hon Seung Kam, Sammo Hung, Shih Chun, Wong Chung	Action	
Fearless Fighters	Mo Man Hung	Chan Hung Lit, Yee Yuen, Cheung Ching Ching		
The Five Devil Ghost	Chiang Ping Han	Kong Nam, Lee Shu, Kong Ching Ha, Chui Chung Hei, Shaw Luo Hui	Kung-fu	With Taiwan
Five Plus Five	Chow Yuk Kong	Zhang Mei Yao, Li Lihua, O Chun Hung, Kwan Shan		
Forced to Fight	Sun Yung	Hon Seung Kam, Tong Wai, Yeung Yeung, Ngai Chi Wong, Lei Ming		
Four Winds	Pai Ching Jui	O Chun Hung, Betty Ting, Cheung Gwong Chiu, Joh Yim Yung, Lee Chi Lun	Drama	With Taiwan

== G-J ==
Title	Director	Cast	Genre	Notes
The Ghost Hill				
The Ghost's Revenge	Chu Yuan, Sam Wing Kin Chi Long			
The Ghost's Sword	Chiang Ping Han			
The Golden Seal	Tien Feng			
He Heals and Kills	Chan Hung Man			
Her Vengeance	Zhu Mu			
Hooded Swordsman	Chan Lit Ban			
House of Tears	Lui Kei			
Husband, Wife, Maid	Ting Shan-hsi			
I Am Crazy About You				
I Want To Sing				
Intruder At White Lotus Temple	Joe Law Chi			
The Invincible Eight	Lo Wei			
The Invincible Iron Palm	Zhu Mu			
Invincible Sword	Chui Chang Wang			
Iron Fan and Magic Sword	Chan Yau San			
The Jade Faced Assassin	Yan Jun			

== K-M ==
Title	Director	Cast	Genre	Notes
The King Boxer	Kung Min			
King Eagle	Chang Cheh			
The Lady Hermit	Ho Meng Hua			
The Lady Professional		Kuei Chih Hung, Mak Chi Woh		
Lady Whirlwind	Huang Feng			
Lady with a Sword	Kao Pao-shu	Lily Ho, James Nam Gung-Fan	Martial arts	
The Lark	Man Sek Ling			
Legends of Cheating	Li Han Hsiang			
The Long Chase	Ho Meng Hua			
Long Road to Freedom	Inoue Umetsugu			
The Long Years	Wu Jiaxiang			
Longstreet				
Mad Killer	Law Chun, Ng See Yuen			
Mad Love Chase				
Magical Power of Fan Li Wa	Li Kuo Hua			
The Magnificent Chivalry	Lee Siu			
The Man With Two Wives	Inoue Umetsugu			
Maria	John Law Ma			
The Matchless Conqueror	Chiang Ping Han			
The Merciful Sword	Poon Lui			
Mighty Couple	Ng Daan			
Mighty One	Joseph Kuo Nam Hung			
Mission Impossible	Joseph Kuo	Chan Hung Lit, Ching Li, Yee Yuen	Martial Arts	
Money and I	John Law Ma	Melinda Chen, Patsy Kar	Comedy	
Monkey Comes Again	Tong Wong			
Morale and Evil				
My Beloved	Patrick Lung Kong			

== N-S ==
Title	Director	Cast	Genre	Notes
The New One-Armed Swordsman	Chang Cheh			
The Night Is Young	Law Chun			
The Oath of Death	Pao Hsueh Lieh			
Oh My Love				
One Armed Boxer	Jimmy Wang Yu	Jimmy Wang Yu	Martial arts	
The Patriotic Heroine				
The Patriotic Knights	Cheung Sing Yim			
The Playful Girl	Yeung Siu			
The Professional Killer	San Kei			
Redbeard	Cheung Chang Chak			
The Rescue	San Kong			
Rider of Revenge	Hung Ting Miu			
Roma Bene	Carlo Lizzani			
Secret of My Millionaire Sister	Cheung Sam			
Shadow Girl	San Kei			
The Shadow Whip	Lo Wei			
She'd Hate Rather Love				
The Silent Love	Yueh Feng			
Six Assassins	Jeong Chang-hwa			
Song of Happy Life	Luk Bong			
Sons and Daughters	Yueh Feng			
The Story of Ti-Ying	Li Han Hsiang			
Struggle For Avengence	Cheung Mei Gwan			
Struggle Karate	Kim Lung			
Sunset	Inoue Umetsugu			
Super Boxer				
The Swift Knight	Jeong Chang Hwa			
The Sword	Poon Lui			
Swordsman At Large	Hsu Tseng-Hung	Wai Wang, Tina Chin Fei, Margaret Hsing Hui, Pai Lin	Martial Arts	

== T-Z ==
Title	Director	Cast	Genre	Notes
Thirty Six Killers	Kiu Chong			
Thousand Years Fox	San Seung Yuk			
A Touch of Zen	King Hu			
The Tsu Hong Wu	Chui Daai Gwan			
Unsung Heroes of the Wilderness	Wong Sing Lui			
Vengeance of A Snowgirl (aka Alias: A Daughters Vengeance. Vengeance of a Snow Girl)	Lo Wei	Li Ching	Martial Arts	
The Venus Tear Diamond	Inoue Umetsugu			
We Love Millionaires	Inoue Umetsugu	Lily Ho, Irene Chen Yi-Ling		
The Wedding Song	Luk Bong			
When We Were Young	Lau Ga Cheong			
You Don't Tell Him				
Younger Generation	Ng Pooi Yung, Wong Wik			
Zatoichi Meets the One-Armed Swordsman	Chui Chang Wang, Kimiyoshi Yasuda			
