= George Lazenby filmography =

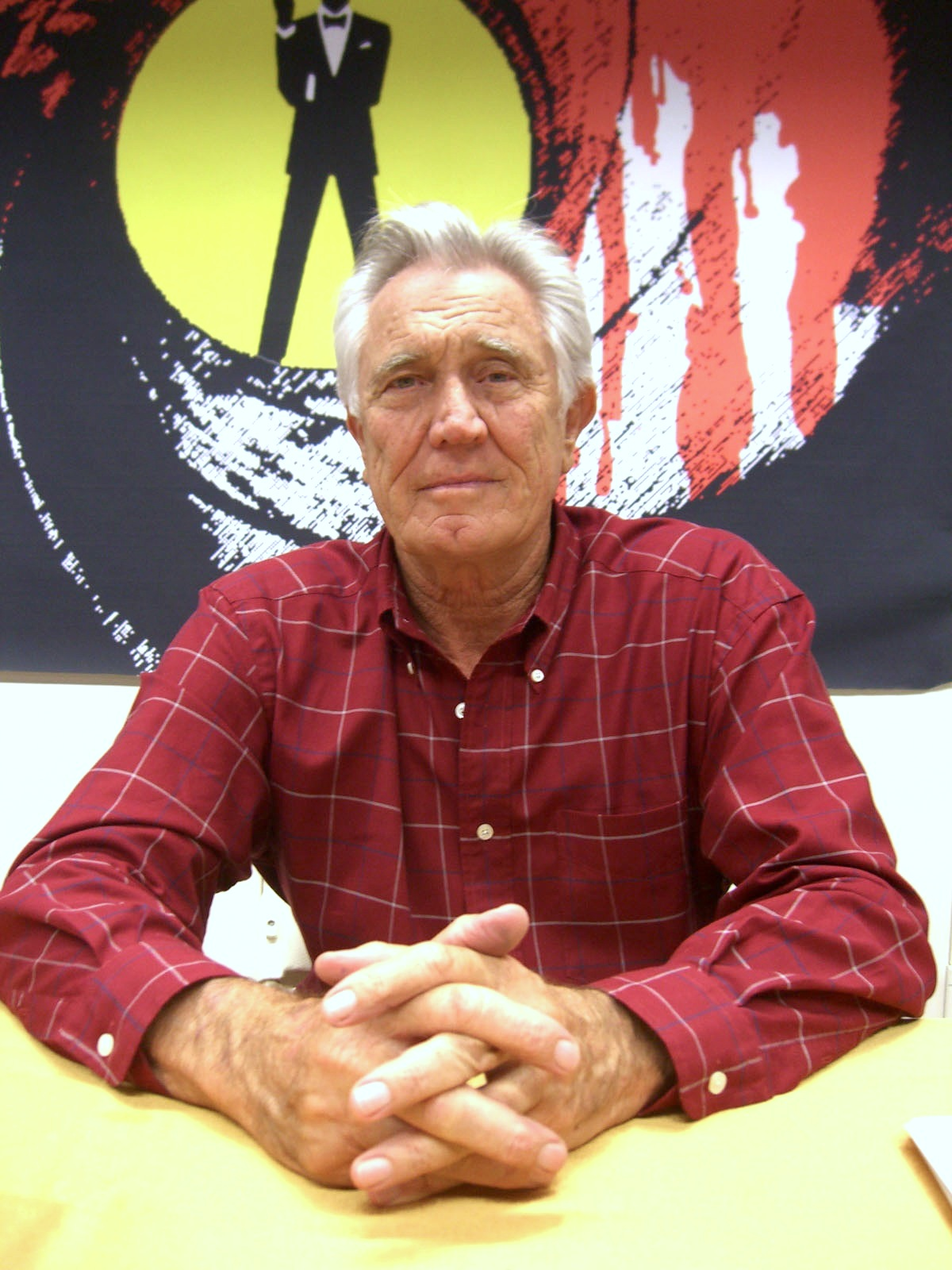
Lazenby at the 2008 Big Apple Convention in Manhattan.

George Lazenby is an Australian actor. He began his working life as a model, and he had only acted in commercials when he took over the role of James Bond from Sean Connery—the first 007—in On Her Majesty's Secret Service (1969). He declined to return for subsequent Bond films, so becoming the only actor to play the character just once. The most notable of his other films were Universal Soldier (1971), Who Saw Her Die? (1972), The Shrine of Ultimate Bliss (1974), and The Man from Hong Kong (1975). He also appeared in minor roles in several later movies.

Lazenby's single portrayal of Bond and lack of standing as a favourite in the series, has resulted in his name being used as a metaphor for forgettable, non-iconic acting efforts in other entertainment franchises, and for entities that are largely ignored.

Lazenby retired from acting in 2024.

== Film ==
Film
Year	Title	Role	Notes	Refs
1969	On Her Majesty's Secret Service	James Bond		
1971	Universal Soldier	Ryker	Writer and executive producer	
1972	Who Saw Her Die?	Franco Serpieri		
1974	Stoner	Joshua Stoner	Released in the United States as The Ultimate Bliss	
1975	The Man from Hong Kong	Jack Wilton	Released in the United States as The Dragon Flies	
1976	A Queen's Ransom	George		
1977	The Kentucky Fried Movie	The Architect	Segment: "That's Armageddon"	
1978	Death Dimension	Capt. Gallagher	Aka Black Eliminator, Freeze Bomb	
1979	Saint Jack	Senator		
1981	Last Harem	Prince Almalarik		
1986	Never Too Young to Die	Drew Stargrove		
1987	Hell Hunters	Heinrich		
1992	Eyes of the Beholder	Jack Wyman		
1993	Gettysburg	J. Johnston Pettigrew		
1993	The Evil Inside Me	Grandinetti		
1994	Twin Sitters	Leland Stromm		
1996	Fox Hunt	Chauncey		
1998	Star of Jaipur	John Steele		
1999	Gut Feeling	—N/a		
2000	Four Dogs Playing Poker	Carlo		
2002	Spider's Web	Leland De Winter		
2003	Winter Break	Campbell Grady	Alternate title: Sheer Bliss	
2014	A Winter Rose	Henry		
2015	Hunter	General Bullmount		
2016	Dance Angels	Captain Hugo		
2017	Death Game	General Bullmount		
2017	Becoming Bond	Himself	Docudrama	
2019	Passport to Oblivion	Dr Jason Love	Audio	
2021	In the Blink of An Eye	G		
2024	Mundije	US President		
TBA	Z Dead End	Agent Smart	Post-production	

== Television ==
Television
Year	Title	Role	Notes	Refs
1973	Play for Today	David Adler	Episode: "The Operation"	
1974	Matlock Police	David Parkes	Episode: "In the Name of the Queen"	
1976	Is There Anybody There?	John Hersey	TV film	
1978	Evening in Byzantium	Roger Tory	Miniseries	
1978	The Newman Shame	John Brandy	TV film	
1979	Hawaii Five-O	John Cossett	Episode: "The Year of the Horse"	
1979	B.J. and the Bear	Burglar / Paul Desmond	2 episodes	
1982	General Hospital	Reginald Durban	5 episodes	
1983	Return of the Man from U.N.C.L.E.	J.B.	TV film	
1984	Hotel	Emmett Saunders	Episode: "Tomorrows"	
1984	The Master	Mallory	Episode: "Hostages"	
1984	Rituals	Logan Williams	9 episodes	
1985	Cover Up	Simon Locke	Episode: "Jack of Spades"	
1987	The Grand Knockout Tournament	Himself	TV special	
1989	Freddy's Nightmares	Dr Clark	Episode: "The End of the World"	
1989	Alfred Hitchcock Presents	James Grant	Episode: "Diamonds Aren't Forever"	
1990	Superboy	Jor-El	2 episodes	
1993	Emmanuelle Forever	Mario	TV film	
1993	Emmanuelle's Revenge	Mario	TV film	
1993	Emmanuelle in Venice	Mario	TV film	
1993	Emmanuelle's Love	Mario	TV film	
1993	Emmanuelle's Magic	Mario	TV film	
1993	Emmanuelle's Perfume	Mario	TV film	
1993	Emmanuelle's Secret	Mario	TV film	
1994	Kung Fu: The Legend Continues	Chi'Ru Master	Episode: "Return of the Shadow Assassin"	
1998	Team Knight Rider	Nigel Davies	Episode: "The Return of Megaman"	
1999	Baywatch	Commander McCabe	Episode: "The Big Blue"	
1999–2000	The Pretender	Major Charles	4 episodes	
1999–2000	Batman Beyond	Mr. Walker/King	Voice, 3 episodes	
2012	This Hour Has 22 Minutes	Bond	Episode #20.9	
2014	Legit	Jack Jefferies	2 episodes	

== Documentaries ==
Film
Year	Title	Role	Notes	Refs
1970	Omnibus	Himself	Documentary; Episode: "Ian Fleming Creator of the James Bond Myth"	
1973	Life and Legend of Bruce Lee	Himself	Documentary	
1974	The Last Days of Bruce Lee	Himself	Documentary	
1974	Kung Fu Killers	Himself	Documentary	
1974	Heisse Ware aus Hongkong	Himself	Documentary	
1975	Celebrity Squares	Panellist	Game show 2 episodes	
1984	Bruce Lee, The Legend	Himself	Archive footage	
1993	Death by Misadventure: The Mysterious Life of Bruce Lee	Himself	Documentary	
1995	In Search of James Bond with Jonathan Ross	Himself	Documentary	
1997	The Secrets of 007: The James Bond Files	Himself	Documentary	
1999	The James Bond Story	Himself	Documentary	
2000	Harry Saltzman: Showman	Himself	Documentary	
2002	E! True Hollywood Story	Himself	Documentary; Episode: "The Bond Girls"	
2002	Premiere Bond: Die Another Day	Himself	Documentary	
2002	In Other Times	Himself	Documentary	
2002	Best Ever Bond	Himself	Documentary	
2006	Press Day in Portugal	Himself	Documentary	
2007	Where Are They Now	Himself	Episode: "Hey Dad"	
2007	On Her Majesty's Secret Service: George Lazenby – In His Own Words	Himself	Documentary	
2007	Casting on "Her Majesty's Secret Service"	Himself	Documentary	
2008	Not Quite Hollywood: The Wild, Untold Story of Ozploitation!	Himself	Documentary	
2009	Whatever Happened To?	Himself	Episode: "Undercover Agents"	
2012	Everything or Nothing	Himself	Documentary	
2012	The Path of the Dragon	Himself	Documentary	
2017	And the Winner Isn't	Himself	Documentary	
2018	A Very Bond Farewell with George Lazenby	Himself	Documentary	
2019	Real Men	Himself	Documentary	
2021	OHMSS50: The Concert	Himself	Video	
2021	OHMSS50: Video Report	Himself	Video documentary	
TBA	This Never Happened to the Other Fella	Himself	Documentary; Post-production	

== Video games ==
Video games
Year	Title	Role	Notes	Refs
1996	Fox Hunt	Chauncey	Live-action video game	
