= Showman =

Person who runs amusement shows

The term showman has multiple meanings, but generally refers to an individual involved in the entertainment industry.

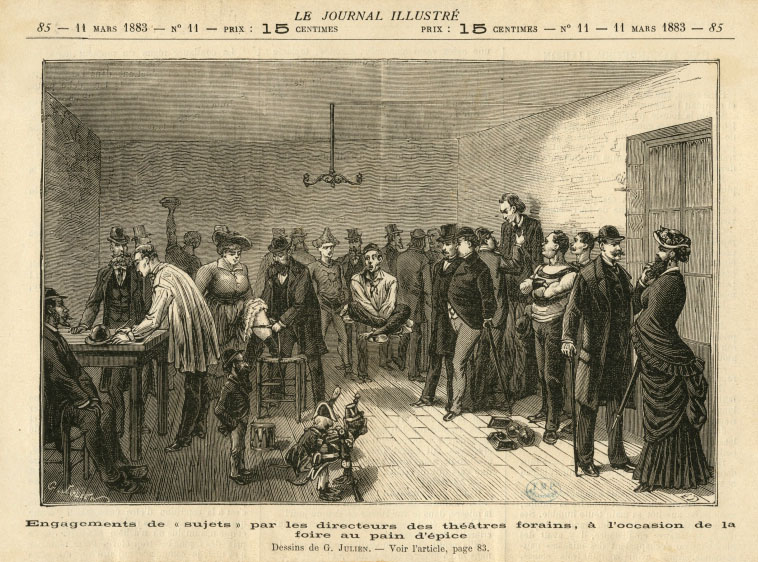
Showman

== Australia ==
Travelling showmen ("showies") are people who run amusement and side show equipment at regional shows, state capital shows, events and festivals throughout Australia. In the past, the term has also been used for the people who organized freak shows, sideshows, circuses, travelling theatre troupes and boxing tents.

In Australia, there are around 500 travelling show families, Australian travelling show families in the Eastern states have a travelling School that has approximately 90 children.

== Ireland ==
Family names associated with funfairs in Ireland include Fox-McFadden, Cassells, Cullen, McFadden, Murray, Bird, Perks and Bell. Turbetts, Hudsons, McCormacks, McGurk, Wilmots and Grahams are associated with coastal amusements, particularly in the west of the country.

== United Kingdom ==
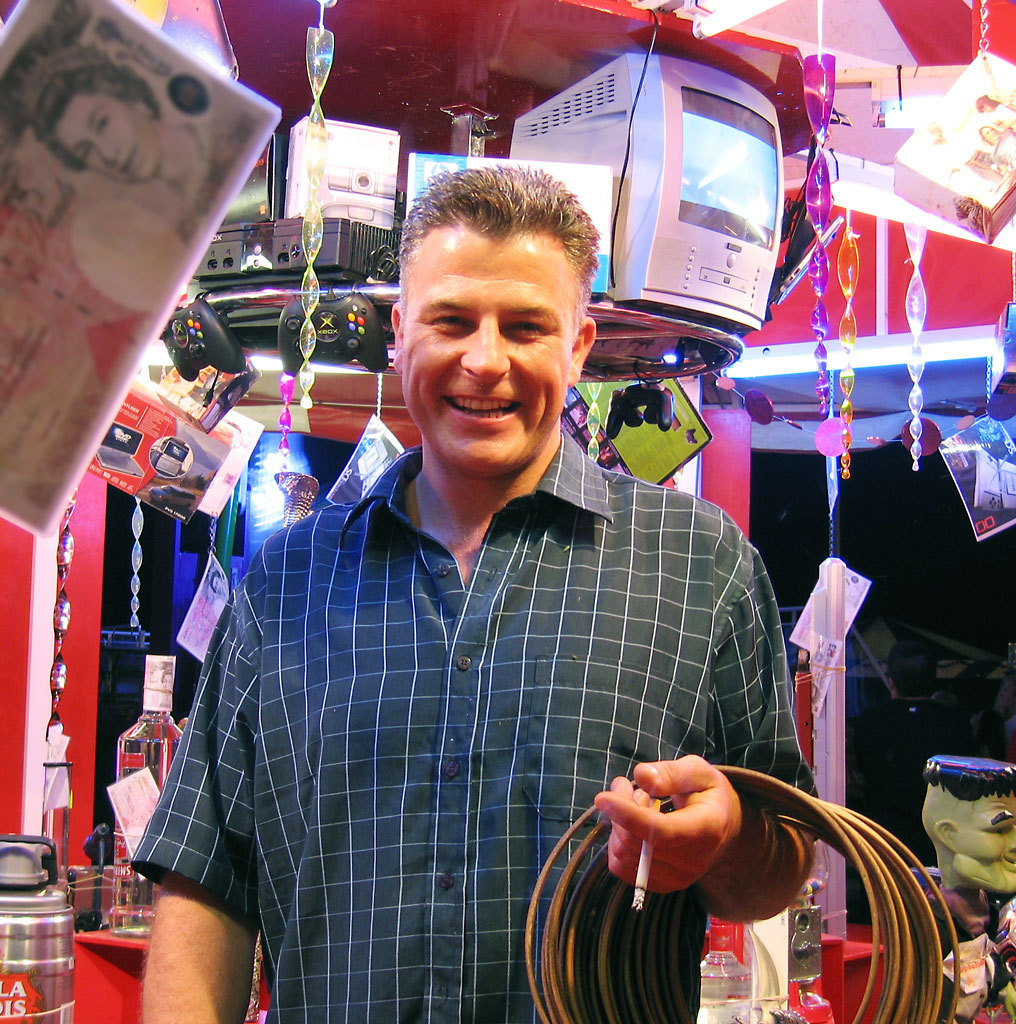
Robert Edwards, a seventh-generation British showman, running his Ring and Blocks stall

In the United Kingdom, showmen are a community intrinsically linked to the businesses they operate, such as funfairs and circuses. The Showmen's Guild of Great Britain is the most dominant trade association, with a membership of around 4,700 and a total collective of 25,000 showmen and -women in the industry. The head of the family is the President. For example, the Guild co-organizes St Giles' Fair in Oxford with Oxford City Council each September, alongside a number of other fairs and events across the UK. A large amount of major events in the UK have a fairground element incorporated, such as the Winter Wonderland in Hyde Park, Leeds Festival and Edinburgh's Festive offering, to name a few. They are considered a cultural or ethnic group in the UK on censuses or application settings, due to their distinct, separate lifestyle and intermarriage over many generations, and unique cultural elements such as historically speaking Parlyaree.

Whilst the Showmen's Guild of Great Britain (SGGB) stands as the largest trade association, there are other, smaller industry bodies such as the Association of Independent Showmen (AIS) and Society of Independent Roundabout Proprietors (SIRPS).

== United States ==
Those of the traveling circus (traveling carnival)—carnies are comparable to Showmen but in the United States, the term showman primarily refers to male dancers (showgirls being the female equivalent).

The term showman or show people, can also be meant as a superlative or complimentary term, sometimes as an accolade or quasi-title, such as in the documentary name Harry Saltzman: Showman.

== See also ==
- Carny
