= Younger Generation =

Younger Generation may refer to:

- Younger Generation, List of Shaw Brothers films List of Hong Kong films of 1971
- The Younger Generation 1929 American film
- "Younger Generation", song on the Lovin' Spoonful's album Everything Playing (1967), covered by the Critters
