= The Blazing Temple =

1976 Hong Kong film by Joseph Kuo

36 Deadly Styles
- Film poster
- Directed by: Joseph Kuo
- Written by: Chui Ming-Him; Joseph Kuo
- Produced by: Joseph Kuo
- Starring: Carter Wong; Jia Ling; Chang Yi
- Cinematography: Shen Chung; Huang Tai-An; Tsai Chang-Hsing
- Edited by: Huang Chiu-Kuei
- Music by: Frankie Chan
- Production company: Hong Hwa International Films (H.K.) Ltd.
- Release date: 9 September 1976 (Hong Kong)
- Running time: 88 minutes
- Countries: Hong Kong; Taiwan
- Language: Chinese

The Blazing Temple (Chinese: 火燒少林寺) is a 1976 independently released Hong Kong martial arts film directed by Joseph Kuo, starring Chang Yi and Carter Wong.

== Plot ==
After discovering that Shaolin is linked with Liu and the Eight Swordsmen - all rebels, Emperor Yong Zheng orders General Kim and his cannon squad to lay waste to the Temple. With little warning, Kim's soldiers begin to fire on the Temple, causing massive death and destruction. Despite the severity of the situation, the abbot orders that the only way students may leave the Temple is by passing through the hall of 18 Bronzemen, in keeping with Temple tradition. Students pour into the hall, ill-prepared to face the rigors of the Bronzemen.

After agonizing over his loss of judgment, the abbot rushes to open another escape route by holding up an enormous stone while students rush underneath. Unable to save himself, the abbot gives the final copy of the famed "18 styles" of kung fu to his trusted student Siu (Carter Wong). Having escaped, Siu and the remaining students and teachers hide from their Manchu pursuers while plotting to kill the Emperor. As one attempt fails, their hopes are set on a final plot, of which the success or failure rests upon a fellow Shaolin monk-turned-traitor.

== Cast ==
- Carter Wong
- Jia Ling
- Chang Yi
