= Eagle's Claw =

1978 Hong Kong film by Lee Tso Nam

- Film poster
- Directed by: Lee Tso Nam
- Produced by: Huang Feng
- Starring: Chi Kwan Chun; Wong Tao; Chang Yi; Hwa Ling; Philip Kao; Leung Kar Yan
- Release date: 1978
- Country: Hong Kong

For the ride, visit Eagle's Claw (Lightwater Valley).

Eagle's Claw (also known as Eagle Fist, Mandarin title Ying zhao tang lang , Cantonese title Ying chau tong long) is a 1978 martial arts film directed by Lee Tso Nam, starring Wong Tao, Chang Yi and Chi Kwan Chun.

== Plot ==
The mainly evil Mantis Fist school and the righteous Eagle Claw have fought out a bitter rivalry over many years. The culmination in this progressive clash is the death of the Eagle's Claw school master due to a severe beating by his savage, eccentric rival. With the school now in turmoil, the dying master leaves the responsibilities of his legacy to his second most senior pupil (Wong Tao) while ignoring the quietly seething senior student (Chi Kwan Chun). The forgotten man cannot contain his rage for long though and storms off to the Mantis Fist school out of spite. While at his new school, the senior student begins to attract the attention of his new master's daughter and makes strong progress in the Mantis Fist school. However, his former friends continue to harbor resentment after his sudden exit and refuse to let the rivalry end. All is not as obvious as it seems though and the real motives of each character is revealed before the classic fight finale.
