= Chang Yi (actor) =

Hong Kong actor and martial artist

- Born: Chang Po-shen (張伯燊); 24 February 1945 (age 81); Huizhou, Guangdong, China

Chinese name
- Traditional Chinese: 張翼
- Simplified Chinese: 张翼
Transcriptions
Standard Mandarin
- Hanyu Pinyin: Zhāng Yì
Yue: Cantonese
- Jyutping: Zoeng^{1} Jik^{6}

Chang Yi (24 February 1945) is a Hong Kong actor, martial artist and director originally from Huizhou, China. He has appeared in over 90 films, mostly martial arts films under the Shaw Brothers Studio. Since the 1980s he mostly acted in television and appeared in over 20 TV series.

He currently resides in Greater Vancouver in Canada.

== Filmography ==
=== Film ===
Year	Title	Role	Notes
1967	The Thundering Sword (神劍震江湖)		
1967	The Silent Swordsman (儒俠)		
1967	King Cat (七俠五義)	Zhan Zhao	
1968	The Silver Fox (玉面飛狐)		
1968	The Bells of Death (奪魂鈴)		
1970	Brothers Five (五虎屠龍)		
1970	Swordswomen Three (江湖三女俠)		
1970	A Taste of Cold Steel (武林風雲)		
1970	The Secret of the Dirk (大羅劍俠)		
1971	Zatoichi and the One-Armed Swordsman		
1971	The Crimson Charm (血符門)		
1971	The Fast Sword (奪命金劍)		
1971	Swordsman at Large (蕭十一郎)		
1971	Duel for Gold (火併)		
1972	The Invincible Sword (一夫官聞)		
1972	Bandits from Shantung (山東響馬)		
1972	Finger of Doom (太陰指)		
1972	Lady Whirlwind (鐵掌旋風腿)		
1972	The Last Duel (俠義雙雄)		
1972	On the Waterfront (黃浦灘頭)		
1972	The Cannibals (黑吃黑)		
1972	The Ghost of Night Crow (大搏殺)		
1976	The Blazing Temple		
1976	Exit the Dragon, Enter the Tiger		
1976	Shaolin Traitorous		
1978	Fatal Needles vs. Fatal Fists		
1978	Eagle's Claw		
1978	Return of the Tiger		
1978	Scorching Sun, Fierce Winds, Wild Fire		
1980	The Victim		
1986	Rise of the Great Wall		
1989	Ode to Gallantry		
1990	Return Engagement		
1991	Man from Guangdong		
1991	Rage and Passion		
1995	The Condor Heroes 95		
1997	Against the Blade of Honour		
2008	Speech of Silence		
2009	Rosy Business		
2012	The Last Steep Ascent		
