= Guo Nanhong =

Guo Nanhong may refer to:

- Joseph Kuo (born 1936), Taiwanese filmmaker
- Guo Nan-hung (1936–2023), Taiwanese electrical engineer, academic administrator, and politician
