= Dance of Death (1979 film) =

- Film poster
- Traditional Chinese: 舞拳
- Simplified Chinese: 舞拳
- Hanyu Pinyin: Wǔ Quán
- Jyutping: Mou2 Kyun4
- Directed by: Chen Chi-hwa
- Screenplay by: Chang Hsin-yi; Yao Ching-kang
- Produced by: Yen Wu-tong
- Starring: Angela Mao; Dean Shek; Hsu Pu-liao; Paul Chun; Chia Kai; Sun Rong-ge
- Cinematography: Chan Chung-yuen
- Edited by: Kwok Ting-hung
- Music by: Stanley Chow
- Production company: Fortuna Film
- Release dates: 1979 (Hong Kong); 4 July 1980 (Taiwan)
- Running time: 86 minutes
- Country: Taiwan
- Language: Mandarin

Dance of Death is a 1979 Taiwanese comedy-themed martial arts film directed by Chen Chi-hwa, with action direction by Jackie Chan, and starring Angela Mao and Dean Shek.

In the film, an orphan girl convinces two rival masters of the martial arts to teach her their techniques. She promises that she can help them find out which of their respective styles is more useful in combat.

== Plot ==
The film is set in The Ming State. Fei-fei (Angela Mao), an orphan, meets two elderly masters, Madman Lu (Hsu Pu-liao) and Hu (Wang Tai-lang), who duel every five years to determine whose martial arts are superior, but they have always been evenly matched for the past twenty years. Fei-fei suggests the two to teach her their skills so she can use it on a worthy opponent and would determine whose martial arts is superior based on whose techniques are more useful.

On one occasion, Fei-fei encounters Ku Cheng-yuan (Paul Chun), the first disciple of the Five Forms School, who is being chased by the Three Birds from the Hundred Birds School - Roc (Chi Fu-chiang), Hawk (Lui Wan-biu) and Little Bird (Wang Yao). Fei-fri helps Ku fend off the Three Birds and Ku reveals that he is on the run from Lo Kuan-tien (Ko Pao), chief of the Hundred Birds School, and Upturned Horse fighter Ma Fa-chun (Chia Kai), who killed Ku's sifu, Lin Nien-hai, for killing Lo's comrade in arms, and swore to wipe out all Five Forms Disciples. After the Three Birds fail their duties to kill Ku, Lo orders his top disciple, Bird Egg (Dean Shek), to be in charge of the matter.

While Bird Egg and the Three Birds were searching for Ku, they once again bump into Fei-fei. Fei-fei attempts to fight Bird Egg using Five Animals Style, but is easily outmatched by Bird Egg, who proves to be more adept in the style. Fei-fei flees and Bird Egg orders Hawk to follow her and discovers Ku to be hiding in Willow Bridge where the school of Hsu Chia-wu (Yu Chung-chiu), brother of Ku's sifu, is located.

Lo, Ma, Bird Egg and Ma's disciple, Shui Chang-liu (Sun Rong-ge) raid Hsu's school where they kill Hsu, Ku, and Hsu's disciple, Lung-yu (Hsiao Yao), while Fei-fei manages to flee. Fei-fei returns to Lu and Hu and trains diligently to seek revenge. After a few days of intense training, Fei-fei once again encounters Three Birds and Bird Eggs, but her elevated martial arts skills helps her defeat Bird Egg. Right after, Fei-fei confronts Lo at the Hundred Birds School to find the whereabouts of Ma before killing Lo in a fight. Lu and Hu, who were present, counts how many of their own respective techniques Fei-fei used in the fights, but was evenly matched again.

Fei-fei, Lu and Hu visit a brothel where Ma's disciple, Shui frequents. There, Lu and Hu witness female dance performers who use martial arts techniques hidden in their dance to fend off drunk customers who attempt to molest them. At this time, Fei-fei also finds Shui and defeats him in a fight and tells him to send a message his sifu to meet at Wan Mountain to next day.

Fei-fei, Lu and Hu arrive at Wan Mountain the next day, where Fei-fei fights Ma but she is outmatched by Ma's Upside-down Horse Boxing. When Lu and Hu step in to help her, they are also outmatched as well and the trio flees. Lu and Hu think of a way to defeat Ma's techniques and remembers the dancing martial arts style they witnessed at the brothel. Therefore, Lu and Hu create a Dance-Boxing style and uses it to Fei-fei while at the same time, Ma also passes his Upside-down Horse Boxing to Shui.

Ma and Shui arrive to kill Fei-fei, Lu and Hu. Fei-fei fights with Shui first, but when Ma steps in the fight, he accidentally kills his disciple. Enraged, Ma then fights Fei-fei. Fei-fei eventually gains the upper hand when she uses Dance-Boxing and with the help of Lu and Hu, manages to kill Ma. However, by the end, it is still undermined whether Lu or Hu's martial arts is superior. As a result, Lu suggests they use Fei-fei as a target to test their superiority and Fei-fei stops them from doing so by bowing to them, much to their delight.

== Cast ==
- Angela Mao as Fei-fei
- Dean Shek as Bird Egg
- Hsu Pu-liao as Madman Lu
- Paul Chun as Ku Cheng-yuan
- Chia Kai as Ma Fa-chun
- Song Rong-ge as Shui Chang-liu
- Yu Chung-chiu as Hsu Chia-wu
- Chi Fu-chiang as Roc
- Hsiao Yao as Lung-yu
- Lui Wan-biu as Hawk
- Wang Tai-lang as Hu
- Chiu Ting as Brothel madam
- Ko Pao as Lo Kuan-tien
- Wang Yao as Little Bird
- Chen Chi-hwa
- Lee Man-tai
- Ai Tsu-wang

== Critical reception ==
Jay Seaver if eFilmCritic Reviews gave the film a score of 2/5 stars, complimenting Jackie Chan's action choreography, but disliked the film's campy tone. Scott Napier of Far East Films gave the film a score of 1.5/5 stars, noting that "the film's characters and action are rarely taken seriously" and criticizing its out-of-places humor.
