= 18 Bronzemen =

1975 Hong Kong film by Joseph Kuo

- DVD release cover
- Directed by: Joseph Kuo
- Written by: Chang Hsin-Yi; Joseph Kuo; Yen Chung
- Produced by: Chan Tak; Joseph Kuo
- Starring: Tien Peng; Nan Chiang
- Cinematography: Chen Ming-Chun; Chen Sheng-tang; Shen Chung; Gozo Matsui
- Edited by: Huang Chiu-Kuei
- Music by: Chen Yung-Yu
- Distributed by: Karlot
- Release date: 31 December 1975 (Taiwan)
- Running time: 101 minutes (original Hong Kong theatrical version); 95 minutes (Japanese theatrical recut version)
- Country: Hong Kong
- Language: Mandarin

18 Bronzemen is a 1975 Hong Kong kung fu film directed by Joseph Kuo. It is a Shaolin-themed film concerning their battles against the Qing Dynasty.

A sequel, called Return of the 18 Bronzemen, followed and was released in the same year.

== Plot ==
The much-reviled Qing government decide to eradicate any opposition to their rule by attacking pro-Ming families in the kingdom. One such attack (revealed later through flashbacks), sees an influential official killed, though his wife and son manage to escape thanks to the intervention of a close ally. While on the run, the son, Shao Lung, is aided by his father's close friend (Jack Long) who teaches the young boy the basics of kung-fu. As time passes, the renegades must once again move on and evade capture by the Qing army. However, it is decided that the safest place for Shao Lung to hide would be in the Ming-friendly Shaolin Temple, where he could also further his knowledge of kung-fu, thus he is delivered to Shaolin by his grandmother. Years later, the young man finds the severe, disciplined monastery life hard to cope with and, despite his best efforts, he lags behind his fellow pupils. He makes two close friends (Brothers Wan and Ta-Chi), and it is their encouragement that drives him to reach his goals. Shao Lung also finds that multiple assassins infiltrate the temple on different occasions and attempt to kill him, but each time they are thwarted with the help of his two brothers, who are curious as to why people are trying to have Shao Lung killed. He gradually develops into a formidable fighter and concentrates his sights on leaving Shaolin to learn about his past. However, to "graduate" from Shaolin means to defeat the 18 Bronzemen, and a series of fiendish tests. His first attempt to conquer these trials is unsuccessful, but Shao Lung is spurred on and accompanied by his straight-talking, no nonsense taking Brother Wan, and they finally leave through Shaolin's hallowed gates after a tremendous effort. Once through the dreaded chambers, the two disciples have the Shaolin crest of the dragon and tiger burnt into their forearms by lifting a huge bronze pot and literally walking out of the back door of the temple grounds.

Outside, the heroes split up temporarily. Shao Lung meets his uncle, who tells him the true story of his past and gives him one half of a royal seal, the other half belonging to his (unknown to him) future wife. He links back up with Brother Wan at a local restaurant, who simultaneously, prevents Shao Lung from escalating a fight he has gotten into with a "young man" who insists on antagonizing him. Once back on their journey, Shao Lung and Brother Wan are constantly stalked by this "young man" who arrogantly claims that Shao Lung owes him his life since he decided to spare him. After an attempt on Shao Lung's life by an assassin disguised as a fortune teller, the "young man" intervenes on Shao Lung's behalf, eventually killing the assassin. This confuses both the injured Shao Lung and Brother Wan until Shao Lung notices that the "young man" has dropped the other half of the royal seal, revealing that she (Miss Lu) is a woman and also his wife-to-be. Nursing Shao Lung back to health, Miss Lu reveals that she has already known about him for years and has been stalking him in order to keep him safe and out of danger. Brother Ta-Chi, who managed to beat the Bronzemen and leave Shaolin, eventually finds his old classmates and offers to help protect Shao Lung from the threats that await him. Unbeknownst to our three heroes, Ta-Chi is a mole who was placed in Shaolin by the Qings, in order to learn Shaolin kung-fu and eventually kill Shao Lung. Brother Ta-Chi eventually makes his assassination attempt on Shao Lung and poisons him in the process, but he is foiled by Brother Wan, who manages to subdue and critically injure him. The dying Ta-Chi repents in his last remaining minutes of life and gives Shao Lung the poison antidote while revealing his actual background and motives. With all of the information that they need to take revenge, Shao Lung, Miss Lu and Brother Wan, move on to deal with the Manchu general and his henchmen.

== Cast ==
- Tien Peng – Shao Lung
- Polly Shang Kuan – Miss Lu
- Carter Wong – Brother Wan
- Nan Chiang – Brother Ta-Chi
- Jack Long – Young Ta-Chi

== Reception ==
In his book Horror and Science Fiction Film IV, Donald C Willis reviewed 18 Bronzemen as a "routine martial arts actioner" noting a "long bizarre sequence in which Shao Lin students face the Bronzemen".
