= The Iron-Fisted Monk =

1977 Hong Kong film by Sammo Hung

- Theatrical poster

Chinese name
- Traditional Chinese: 三德和尚與舂米六
- Simplified Chinese: 三德和尚与舂米六
Transcriptions
Standard Mandarin
- Hanyu Pinyin: Sān Dé Hé Shàng Yǔ Chōng Mǐ Liù
Yue: Cantonese
- Jyutping: Saam1 Dak1 Wo4 Seong2 Jyu2 Zung1 Mai2 Leok6
- Directed by: Sammo Hung
- Written by: Huang Feng; Sammo Hung; Yu Ting
- Produced by: Raymond Chow
- Starring: Sammo Hung; Chan Sing; Fung Hark-on; Lo Hoi-pang
- Cinematography: Lee Yiu-ting
- Edited by: Peter Cheung
- Music by: Frankie Chan
- Production company: Golden Harvest
- Distributed by: Golden Harvest
- Release date: 25 August 1977
- Running time: 93 minutes
- Country: Hong Kong
- Language: Cantonese
- Box office: HK$2.28 million

The Iron-Fisted Monk (Chinese: 三德和尚与舂米六) is a 1977 Hong Kong martial arts film starring and directed by Sammo Hung in his directorial debut. The screenplay was co-written by Hung, Huang Feng and Yu Ting. The film co-stars Chan Sing, Fung Hark-on and Lo Hoi-pang. The film was released on 25 August 1977.

== Plot ==
Hawker (Sammo Hung) is sent to the Shaolin temple by the Iron-Fisted Monk (Chan Sing), after he saves Hawker from a beating by the Manchus. After being trained by his senior fellow classmate (James Tien), he runs away from the temple, only to be confronted by his elder and forced to take the four tests. Whilst this is happening, an official (Fung Hak-on) is indulging in his passion for raping women and is virtually above the law as he is a powerful Manchu officer. He begins by raping Liang's (Lo Hoi-pang) sister (Chu Ching), who then commits suicide and makes Liang a very angry man. Liang takes his revenge by killing one of those pesky Manchus but everyone thinks Hawker is responsible.

Both Liang and Hawker go to meet the Iron Fisted Monk who convinces Hawker to teach all the workers at the dye factory kung fu, so they can defend themselves against the Manchus. The final act involves the Manchus' butchering of the workers from the dye factory, kill Liang's wife and Liang's mother (Liang's wife was raped before being killed). When Liang eventually dies from his wounds, both Hawker and the Iron Fisted Monk swear vengeance on the Manchus, and it is delivered.

== Cast ==
- Sammo Hung as Hawker
- Chan Sing as Monk Sam Tak (The Iron-Fisted Monk)
- Fung Hark-on as Official
- Lo Hoi-pang as Liang
- Chu Ching as Liang's sister
- Chu Ching as Ah Chen, Liang's wife
- Wang Hsieh as Rapist's boss
- Dean Shek as Manchu
- James Tien as Hawker's instructor (cameo)
- Wu Ma as Miss Chuen's client (cameo)
- Lam Ching-ying as Shu-liu worker
- Casanova Wong as Shaolin disciple
- Eric Tsang as Shu-liu worker
- Chung Fat as Shu-liu worker
- Fung Fung as Brother worker
- Mars as Shu-liu worker
- Lai Man as Liang's mother

(*) Note: There are two different actresses named Chu Ching in the film. One portrays Liang's wife and the other portrays Liang's sister.

== Release ==
The film grossed HK$2,283,594.40 during its 15-week theatrical run. It was released on DVD on 29 October 2001 in the UK and 7 September 2004 in the US.

The Hong Kong version of the film contains a longer version of the rape of Liang's wife than the American release.

== Reception ==
Almar Haflidason of BBC Online rated it 4/5 stars and recommended it to Sammo Hung fans. J. Doyle Wallis of DVD Talk rated it 3.5/5 stars and wrote, "Iron-Fisted Monk moves briskly with some solid fights and a decent story." David Johnson of DVD Verdict wrote, "A lackadaisical start gives way to a relentless hand-to-hand spectacle of zaniness."

== See also ==
- Lists of Hong Kong films
- Sammo Hung filmography
