= 36 Deadly Styles =

1979 Taiwanese-Hong Kong film by Joseph Kuo

- Film poster
- Directed by: Joseph Kuo
- Written by: Joseph Kuo
- Produced by: Joseph Kuo
- Starring: Jack Long; Mark Long; Hwang Jang-lee; Ching Li; Bolo Yeung; Jeannie Chang
- Cinematography: Leung Kin
- Edited by: Vincent Leung Wing-Chan
- Music by: Lawrence Chan
- Production company: Hong Hwa International Films (H.K.) Ltd.
- Release date: 1979 (Taiwan)
- Running time: 90 minutes
- Countries: Taiwan; Hong Kong
- Language: Mandarin

36 Deadly Styles is a 1979 independently released martial arts film directed by Joseph Kuo starring Jack Long, Mark Long, and Hwang Jang-lee.

== Plot ==
The pace and tone of the film is immediately made clear with an opening fight in the woods as Wah-jee (Cheung Lik) and his uncle (Sham Chin-bo) attempt to flee from ruthless fighters led by Mien Tsu-mun (Chan Lau). The pair make it to a Buddhist temple, but the uncle dies after Tsu-mun and his thugs break in. A fighter turned monk named Huang (Yeung Chak-lam) manages to kill most of them. Once recovered from his wounds, Wah-jee is put to work at the temple, making soy milk runs into town and cleaning out the smoke-filled oven. He spends time with two junior monks and trades friendly kung fu blows with Tsui-jee (Jeannie Chang), the attractive soy milk seller.

Tsu-mun returns to the area with two martial brothers (including Bolo Leung). Fed up with the torturous regimen of chores at the temple, Wah-jee leaves but overhears Tsu-mun's plans to kill Huang and decides to warn his mentor. A fight ensues that Wah-jee survives only after he is forcibly pulled away by Tsui-jee's father (Fan Mei-sheng). At this point, Wah-jee learns that his own father died at the hands of a silver-haired fighter (Hwang Jang-lee) who belongs to the same group as Tsu-mun. Three martial brothers initially escaped Jang-lee's attack, but now only Tsui-jee's father remains. Wah-jee, Tsui-jee and her father go into hiding where Wah-jee begins to master the 36 Deadly Styles just in time to face Jang-lee.

There is also a smaller parallel plot interwoven with the previous one involving a brother of Jang-lee (Mark Long) who heads off to a Tibetan temple to seek out a kung fu master named Kaung Wu Chun (Jack Lung) in order to get the manual of 36 Deadly Styles.

== Cast ==
- Jack Long
- Mark Long
- Hwang Jang-lee
- Ching Li
- Bolo Yeung
- Jeannie Chang

== Home Media ==
36 Deadly Styles was released on blu ray in 2021 by Eureka in the UK as part of Cinematic Vegeance! 8 Kung Fu Classics from Director Joseph Kuo.
