= Born Invincible =

1978 film

- Film poster
- Directed by: Joseph Kuo
- Written by: Joseph Kuo; Yao Ching Kang
- Produced by: Joseph Kuo
- Starring: Carter Wong; Jack Long; Mark Long; Lo Lieh; Nancy Yen
- Cinematography: Wu Kuo-Hsiao
- Edited by: Huang Chiu-Kuei
- Music by: Frankie Chan
- Distributed by: Ocean Shore
- Release date: 1978
- Running time: 83 minutes
- Country: Taiwan
- Language: Mandarin Chinese

Born Invincible (Chinese: 太极气功) is a 1978 Taiwanese kung fu film directed by Joseph Kuo, with action choreography by Yuen Woo-ping, and starring Carter Wong, Jack Long and Lo Lieh. Currently, only the English-language dubbed version is widely available on UK DVD (pan and scan) format. The original Mandarin version was released onto VHS format in the 1980s and is now out of print. A rare Japanese-language dubbed version (ドラゴン太極拳/Doragon Taikyokuken) can be found online. There is a European Spanish-language dubbed version available too.

== Plot ==
The film opens with a montage of a youth learning the techniques of tai chi. A narration explains the rigors of tai chi, and the effects it has on the individuals who learn it. When a person masters tai chi, their body becomes impregnable to any weapon, but has a side effect of turning the person's hair white by age thirty and their voices attain a high tone. Students of the Lei Ping Kung Fu school witness two thugs from the Chin Yin Chi clan chase and beat an old man in front of his daughter. The lead student, Ming Tu, interrupts the attack and the thugs use weapons on the students. Ming Tu manages to fight off the duo, but one of his fellow students is mortally wounded. The two thugs warn the students that the Chin Yin Chi clan will be back to kill them. Ming Tu escorts the old man and his daughter back to the Lei Ping school, where the wise master takes them under his protection.

The two leaders of the Chin Yin Chi clan, Chief Chin and Chin Pa, show up at the Lei Ping school, demanding that the master hand over the old man. He refuses and one of his top pupils offers to go and fight for the schools honor. Despite his magnificent martial arts ability, he is no match. The master selects Ming Tu as his successor and faces the aggressors, but he is overpowered and killed. The old man, having taken an oath of peace, picks up a sword for the first time in twenty years and leaps into battle, but he too is taken down by the powerful duo. Ming Tu assumes leadership of the school and promises his students that the school will continue as the master intended and they will take revenge against the Chin Yin Chi clan. Ming Tu comes up with a plan to take Chin Pa out of the equation, since he is not invulnerable. He challenges Chin Pa to a duel, but he falls victim to Chin Pa's loaded steel baton with a blade, but he escapes.

Ming Tu undergoes rigorous training to prepare for the next confrontation. He thinks up a way to counter Chin Pa's baton—by covering his sword in oil so his opponent cannot get a grip on it, which works, and Ming Tu kills Chin Pa. Chief Chin discovers the death and looks for Ming Tu. Ming seeks additional training before he can face Chief Chin, but is forced into a confrontation with him. Chief Chin beats Ming unmercifully. The next senior pupil of the Wei Ping school, Sa Chien takes charge since Ming Tu is out of action. He trains hard to beat Chief Chin, but Sa Chien cannot get the job done and barely escapes. The master's daughter meets an old nun who tells her how to find Chief Chin's weak point "when he is not himself." With her aid, Sa Chien discovers that Chief Chin has one vulnerable spot, but getting him to expose it is near impossible unless he can get him to act other than "himself."

== Cast ==
- Carter Wong as Tieh Wu Ching
- Jack Long as Ming Tu
- Mark Long as Sa Chien
- Lo Lieh as Ku Yu Tieh
- Nancy Yen as Ying Ying
- Wong Fei-lung as Lu Ping
- Alan Chui Chung-San as Pa Chu
- Corey Yuen as Hei Pai Killer
- Yuen Shun-yi as Hei Pai Killer
- Su Chen Ping as Liu Chin
