= The Mystery of Chess Boxing =

1979 Hong Kong film by Joseph Kuo

- Theatrical release poster
- Directed by: Joseph Kuo
- Written by: Joseph Kuo; Ping Han Chiang
- Produced by: Joseph Kuo
- Starring: Jack Long; Lee Yi-Min; Lung Kuan-Wu
- Cinematography: Chang Hui-kung
- Edited by: Huang Chiu-Kuei
- Music by: Huang Mao-Shan
- Production company: Hong Hwa International Films
- Release date: 1979
- Running time: 90 minutes
- Country: Hong Kong
- Languages: Mandarin; Cantonese

The Mystery of Chess Boxing (Chinese: 雙馬連環; pinyin: Shuāng mǎlián huán; also known as Ninja Checkmate) is a 1979 Hong Kong kung fu film written, produced and directed by Joseph Kuo and starring Mark Long, Jack Long and Lee Yi Min.

== Plot ==
Ah Pao wants to learn kung fu so that he can avenge his father's death at the hands of the Ghost Faced Killer. The Ghost Faced Killer meanwhile is hunting down a number of clan leaders who all conspired to have him killed. Before attacking, the killer always throws down his "ghost face killing plate", a decorated metal plate with a red face. He then uses his distinctive five elements style.

Ah Pao attends a local kung fu school, but is bullied by the seniors. However, the school's cook helps the boy and teaches him some moves after challenging Ah Pao to steal one grain of rice from the Chef's bowl. He succeeds only by cheating and waiting for the master to finish his meal. The chef then teaches Ah Pao some kung fu, but admits that he will never be good enough. He tells him, "When the time comes to go, I'll tell you where to go all right." He proves to be adequate for his day-to-day living but cannot fulfill his deep desire for revenge. When Ah Pao is found in possession of the Ghost Faced Killer's symbol, he is expelled from school. While he leaves in exile, his teacher is forced to shut the school down in fear of his students being killed. After the students leave, the Teacher is killed by the Ghost Faced Killer. Still wishing to learn kung fu, Ah Pao turns to an old xiangqi (Chinese chess) master Chi Sue Tin, recommended by the cook, for training. The master is an old enemy of the Ghost Faced Killer who reveals his former identity: he was a former kung fu chief who held sway over the area with his fellow fighters, but he was forced to go into hiding after being badly injured in a fight and also coming under scrutiny by the Ghost Faced Killer. Chi Sue agrees to teach Lee his chess boxing kung fu.

Ah Pao finally learns the strategic link between chess and kung fu. He and Chi Sue Tin team up and they defeat the Ghost Faced Killer.

== Cast ==
- Lee Yi Min as Ah Pao
- Jack Long as Chi Sue Tin
- Mark Long as Ghost-Faced Killer
- Simon Yuen as Master Yuen (cook)
- Jeanie Chang as Chi Sue Tin's granddaughter

== Reception ==
In the 1995 book The Encyclopedia of Martial Arts Movies, authors Bill Palmer, Karen Palmer and Richard Meyers gave the film a score of three-and-a-half out of four stars. Though criticizing the distribution title Ninja Checkmate on the grounds of there not being any ninjas depicted in the film, they wrote, "What you will see are great training scenes and forms. Though some frames have been cut to enhance the fights and some wires are used, the martial arts and choreography are fantastic."

== In popular culture ==
The Wu-Tang Clan song "Da Mystery of Chessboxin'", which appears on their 1993 album Enter the Wu-Tang (36 Chambers), derives its title from The Mystery of Chess Boxing. Additionally, Wu-Tang Clan member Ghostface Killah derived his stage name from the film's villain, the Ghost-Faced Killer.

DJ Hazard's song "Killers Don't Die" samples the American dubbed soundtrack from this film.

== See also ==
- Chess boxing
