= Deadly China Doll =

1973 Hong Kong film by Huang Feng

- Directed by: Huang Feng
- Written by: Huang Feng
- Produced by: Raymond Chow
- Starring: Angela Mao; Carter Wong
- Distributed by: Golden Harvest
- Release date: 1972
- Running time: 94 minutes
- Country: Hong Kong
- Languages: Cantonese; Mandarin

Deadly China Doll also known as The Opium Trail is a 1972 Hong Kong action martial arts film written and directed by Huang Feng, produced by Raymond Chow, and starring Angela Mao.

== Synopsis ==
Pai Chen seeks revenge against Scarface Wu Hsu, who runs an opium smuggling ring. Hsu plans a drug deal which Pai plans to foil.

== Cast ==
- Angela Mao as Hei Lu
- Carter Wong as Pai Chien
- Ko Hsiang-ting

== Reception ==
On October 3, 1973, it debuted at No.1 at the US Box Office.
