= Angela Mao =

Taiwanese actress and martial artist

- 茅瑛
- Born: Mao Fuching (茅復靜); 20 September 1950 (age 76); Taiwan
- Occupations: Actress; martial artist
- Years active: 1970s–1992
- Spouse: Kelly Lai Chen (m. 1974; div. 1980)
- Children: Yee Pai Sy (daughter), with Kelly Lai Chen; George King (son), with 2nd husband

Chinese name
- Chinese: 茅瑛
Transcriptions
Standard Mandarin
- Hanyu Pinyin: Máo Yīng
Yue: Cantonese
- Jyutping: Maau4 Jing1

Angela Mao Ying (born Mao Fuching; 20 September 1950) is a Taiwanese actress and martial artist who is best known for appearing in martial arts films in the 1970s. Born in Taiwan, she studied at a Peking Opera school, the Fu Sheng Opera School, from the age of six to fourteen. In addition to training in stagecraft, Mao took lessons in martial arts and this led both to her discovery in the late 1960s by director Huang Feng and a contract with the famous Golden Harvest company. Following the wuxia pian swordplay picture The Angry River (1971), Mao was teamed in 1972 with Carter Wong and Sammo Hung in Hapkido, after which she became known as "Lady Kung Fu." She acquired another nickname after the 1972 revenge flick, Lady Whirlwind.

In 1973, she played Su Lin, the sister of Bruce Lee's character in Enter the Dragon. Further hits followed with The Himalayan (1976), Dance of Death (1979), whose fight scenes were choreographed by Jackie Chan, and director King Hu's The Fate of Lee Khan (1973). Mao also collaborated with Australian actor George Lazenby on The Shrine of Ultimate Bliss (1974) and reunited with Wong on When Taekwondo Strikes (1973) and The Association (1974) and Hung on Broken Oath (1977). At the peak of her fame in the 1970s, Mao was marketed as the female version of Bruce Lee.

Mao is widely considered one of the greatest martial arts stars in the history of cinema. After her retirement from acting, Mao moved to the United States. She is the owner of Nan Bei Ho restaurant in New York.

== Biography ==
Mao was born as Mao Fuching in 1950. She is the daughter of Mao Yung Kang, Peking Opera star, who moved from China to Taiwan in 1949. Her family was originally from Zhejiang province. Angela was originally a Chinese opera actress before becoming an action film actress. At a young age, she attended ballet classes before joining The Fu Shing Peking Opera in 1958. She attended for 10 years, specializing in daomadan roles.

When she was 17, her godfather brought the Golden Harvest director Huang Feng, to one of her performances and he later cast her in a series of Golden Harvest movies. Huang Feng was being sent by Golden Harvest to Korea where he directed six movies, largely with the same crew and many of the same cast members. Mao staying in Korea for 18 months where she also starred in Lady Whirlwind, and trained for four months alongside Sammo Hung and Carter Wong in the Korean martial art of Hapkido for a lead role in a film of the same name, also featuring their Hapkido master, Jin Han-Jae. Mao would eventually go on to earn a second-dan black belt in Hapkido, an expertise which set her apart from many other Hong Kong actors who merely acted out choreographed fight scenes.

Lady Whirlwind was released first in Hong Kong but its performance was underwhelming, running for one week at the box office instead of the standard two, but Hapkido turned out to be a hit and established her onscreen. Seeing its success, Bruce Lee approached Golden Harvest head Raymond Chow and recommended he try to replicate the same formula, only this time featuring the Korean martial art of taekwondo and featuring his friend Jhoon Rhee, the teacher largely credited for bringing taekwondo to the United States. Chow agreed, and Mao, Sammo Hung, and Carter Wong teamed up under the direction of Huang Feng to make When Taekwondo Strikes in the Spring of 1973.

By this time, Lady Whirlwind had been picked up for release in the United States where it was re-titled Deep Thrust and billed Mao as "Mistress of the Death Blow." The campaign caught on and the movie became a huge hit, hitting the top of Variety's box office chart. Mao's other movies were picked up by American distributors in rapid succession and became seen across the country under different titles, Hapkido became Lady Kung Fu and The Opium Trail became Deadly China Doll.

By the time When Taekwondo Strikes was released in Hong Kong in September, 1973 Mao was known as an international star and one of the featured players in Bruce Lee's Enter the Dragon, a movie which had not yet been released in Hong Kong but was already an enormous blockbuster overseas. As a result of her growing international reputation, When Taekwondo Strikes became an enormous box office success.

Mao continued with a string of successful movies throughout the seventies. Her final film for Golden Harvest was Broken Oath, a remake of Japan's Lady Snowblood from Korean director, Chung Chang-Hwa, and after her contract expired she returned to Taiwan and for the next five years continued to make kung fu movies.

Mao married Kelly Lai Chen in 1974 and gave birth to a daughter, Hsi Pui Sze, in 1976. They divorced in 1980. She later remarried and had a son, George King, who was born in 1983. She retired from acting in 1992 to devote herself to her family. She moved to New York City in 1993, where she and her family run three restaurants.

== Filmography ==
- The Angry River (1970) – Lan Feng
- Thunderbolt (1970)
- The Invincible Eight (1971)
- Deadly China Doll (1972) – Hei Lu
- Hapkido (1972) – Yu Ying
- Lady Whirlwind (1972) – Miss Tien
- Enter the Dragon (1973) – Su Lin
- Back Alley Princess (1973) – Ying
- When Taekwondo Strikes (1973) – Wan Ling-ching
- The Two Great Cavaliers (1973)
- The Fate of Lee Khan (1973)
- Naughty! Naughty! (1974)
- Stoner (1974) – Angela Li Shou-Hua
- The Invincible Kung Fu Trio (1974)
- The Tournament (1974)
- The Association (1975)
- The Himalayan (1975)
- International Assassins (1976) – Queen of Cambodia
- Lady Karate (1976)
- Duel with the Devils (1977) – Chu
- Invincible (1976)
- A Queen's Ransom (1976)
- The Eternal Conflict (1976) – Fei Fei
- Duels in the Desert (1977)
- Broken Oath (1977) – Lotus Lin
- The Damned (1978)
- Iron Maiden (1978) – Chin Lun
- Scorching Sun, Fierce Wind, Wild Fire (1978)
- Return of the Tiger (1978)
- Dance of Death (1979)
- Snake Deadly Act (1979) – Brothel Madam
- Flying Masters of Kung Fu (1979)
- Moonlight Sword and Jade Lion (1981)
- The Stunning Gambling (1982)
- Ninja, the Violent Sorcerer (1982) – Anna (uncredited)
- Book and Sword Chronicles (TV series) (1984) – Luo Bing
- Eastern Condors (1987) (extra)
- Devil Dynamite (1987)
- Invincible God Sword (TV series) (1989)
- First Clan of Heroes Mu Gui Ying (TV series) (1989) – Mu Gui Ying
- Ghost Bride (1992)

== Bibliography ==
- Zhiwei Xiao, Yingjin Zhang: Encyclopedia of Chinese Film. Taylor & Francis, 2002, ISBN 0203195558, S. 237 (online copy, p. 237, at Google Books)
- Ric Meyers: Films of Fury: The Kung Fu Movie Book. Eirini Press 2001, ISBN 9780979998942, S. 172–174 (online copy, p. 172, at Google Books)
- E. K. Padberg: Angela Mao Ying: de kung fu dame – article in a Dutch magazine
