= The Shrine of Ultimate Bliss =

1974 Hong Kong film by Huang Feng

- Stoner Hong Kong film poster
- Directed by: Huang Feng
- Written by: Huang Feng; Ni Kuang
- Produced by: Raymond Chow
- Starring: Angela Mao; George Lazenby; Betty Ting; Hwang In-shik; Joji Takagi; Sammo Hung
- Cinematography: Lee Yau-tong
- Edited by: Peter Cheung; Michael Kaye
- Music by: Tony Orchez
- Production company: Golden Harvest
- Distributed by: Golden Harvest; Cathay
- Release date: 2 August 1974
- Running time: 107 minutes
- Country: Hong Kong
- Languages: Mandarin Chinese; English
- Box office: HK$555,003

The Shrine of Ultimate Bliss, also known as Stoner, A Man Called Stoner, and Hong Kong Hitman (Chinese: 鐵金剛大破紫陽觀) is a 1974 Hong Kong action film which was produced by Raymond Chow and directed by Huang Feng.

The film was originally scheduled to be Bruce Lee's next film after Game of Death. However Lee died while filming Game of Death in 1973 and that film's release date was delayed by five years.

It was the first of three films George Lazenby made for Golden Harvest, the others being The Man from Hong Kong (1975) and A Queen's Ransom (1976).

== Plot ==
When a tough Australian cop named Stoner (George Lazenby) discovers that his sister has overdosed on a deadly new drug called "The Happy Pill" (an aphrodisiac/hallucinogen mixture), he travels to Hong Kong to track down its creators. Along the way, he meets up with a beautiful secret agent (Angela Mao) who's on her own mission to investigate the same drug ring.

== Cast and roles ==
- George Lazenby as Joseph Stoner
- Angela Mao as Angela Li Shou-hua
- Betty Ting as Agnes Wong Yen-yen
- Hwang In-shik as Mr. Big
- Joji Takagi as Mr. Chin
- Sammo Hung as Chen-Chin
- Samuel J. Peake as Cult leader
- Lu Chin as Helen
- Romanolee Rose as Melanie
- Hung Sing-chung as Inspector Feng
- Su Chiang as Kuan Te-jen
- Chin Chi-chu
- Chin Lu as Club girl
- Yi Feng
- Nick Lam
- Ching Siu-tung as Gang member
- Andre Morgan
- Ren Hao as Fake priest
- Suen Lam as Gangster
- Roger Ward as Biker
- Yuen Biao as Thug at temple
- Eric Tsang as Thug at temple
- Yuen Wah as Thug

== Production ==
Originally, The Shrine of Ultimate Bliss was to star not only Lee, but also Japanese film star Sonny Chiba as well. The film was to pit Lee against "The Western Adversary" played by James Bond star George Lazenby. Lazenby had been signed to a multi-picture deal by Lee and Chow during Game of Death and was to star in that film, as well as two subsequent films with Lee. The film's original tagline was "It's Lee! It's Lazenby! It's Bruce Versus Bond!".

Warner Brothers was going to co-produce and distribute the film before Lee's sudden death and was going to give The Shrine of Ultimate Bliss a large worldwide release, a $10,000,000 production budget and a $10,000,000 worldwide marketing budget (which was astronomical at that time – as a comparison the 1974 James Bond film The Man With The Golden Gun also a 1974 release had only a $7,000,000 production budget and a $6,000,000 worldwide marketing budget). Forecasts for The Shrine of Ultimate Bliss' worldwide box office gross were around $400,000,000. This based on Lee's previous two films. Enter the Dragon (1973) cost just $850,000 to produce and also had a $10,000,000 worldwide marketing budget, and in turn it grossed more than $265,000,000 worldwide at the box office (through 2006), making it the second highest grossing movie worldwide of the year 1973, behind The Exorcist.

Enter the Dragon grossed more than $21,000,000 in the US just in 1973 alone and more than $4,000,000 in the US in 1974. Through 2006 the film has grossed more than $115,000,000 in the US alone. It grossed more than $65,000,000 overseas through 1973, and more than $90,000,000 overseas through 1974. Through 2006 it has grossed more than $150,000,000 overseas. Lee's film prior to Enter the Dragon, Way of the Dragon (1973), had cost just $130,000 to produce and about $1,000,000 to market worldwide and it in turn grossed more than $85,000,000 worldwide at the box office, which made it the 6th highest grossing film worldwide of 1973.

So considering that Way of the Dragon grossed more than $85,000,000 at the box office worldwide with just a $130,000 production budget/$1,000,000 marketing budget, and that Enter the Dragon grossed more than $265,000,000 at the box office worldwide with just an $850,000 production budget/$10,000,000 marketing budget, then it isn't too far-fetched to realize Warner Brother's $400 million gross prediction for Shrine with its $20,000,000 total cost in production and marketing, as well as Lazenby and Chiba joining Lee in the cast.

George Lazenby had said that one of the main reasons that he quit the role of Bond was because he felt that he could gross more at the box office in other films. The Bond film The Man With The Golden Gun (1974), ended up grossing $97,600,000 worldwide, so if not for Lee's sudden death, Lazenby's quite bold and now rather infamous prediction may have come true.

On 20 July 1973 Bruce Lee was meant to have dinner with George Lazenby and Raymond Chow to discuss Game of Death. However Lee died that afternoon.

=== Aftermath of Bruce Lee's death ===
When Lee died the film's destiny took a turn for the worse. First, Lee, who may have been the biggest star in the world at the time the film was to be shot, was now not going to be in the film. Second, upon hearing of Lee's death, Chiba refused to sign his contract for the film and promptly flew back to Japan. Third, Lee's death brought terrible press, especially since the film's other star Lazenby was supposed to have dinner with Lee the very night he died. Fourth, Warner Brothers then dropped out and the film lost its large worldwide theatrical distribution. And finally, because of all of this Raymond Chow cut the film's production budget from $10,000,000 to $850,000 and severely cut the marketing budget to cover the film's new small theatrical release. Although this was still an enormous production budget for a Hong Kong-based film at that time, and actually matched Enter the Dragon as the most expensive martial arts film of all time at that point, the huge cut in marketing and loss of worldwide distribution greatly hurt the film's box office.

Despite this, the film still featured former 007 Lazenby, whom despite being tabbed by the press as a "failed Bond financially", had still nonetheless grossed well over $100 million worldwide at the box office in the early 1970s, as his Bond film On Her Majesty's Secret Service (1969) had grossed $87,400,000 worldwide through 1970, and his subsequent two films Universal Soldier (1971) and Who Saw Her Die? (1972) had pushed him over the $100 million mark at the box office, which at that time established actor's as international super stars. Even though Lazenby never got that label in the US or UK from the press, in reality it was true as he had tremendous box office success in Europe, Asia, and Australia (he actually outgrossed Steve McQueen in that time, as just one example). So the film still had Chow's studio behind it, a big international star, and a large budget for a martial arts film.

Lazenby said that after Lee's death Chow "sent his hatchet men in."

In October 1973 Lazenby said the film would be called The Golden Needles of Ecstasy. He added:

I have worked out every day for two hours and have run three miles every morning to get fit for the role. It is the most taxing form of film fighting activity in the world. You can't be slow and hope to look as if you're standing up to these experts. But you learn from the fight masters employed on the film, learn a bit of karate and a bit of ballet and hope to keep on your feet. What I mostly want to do is earn us enough money to live the way we want to. Nothing on earth could buy me into the degradation of another Bond film, with all that entails.

To try to keep the success of Lee's films going, Chow added in Hong Kong stars Angela Mao, Betty Ting, and Sammo Hung and also well-known Australian actor Roger Ward to the film's cast along with Lazenby. In addition to this he also enlisted rival studio Shaw Brothers run by Run Run Shaw as another producer to help pay for the film's huge production cost based on Hong Kong film industry standards. Chow also kept producer Andre Morgan on board as he had helped with Lee's films and this would help to bring video revenue years later.

Hung recalled Lazenby "wasn't a martial artist as such but he moved pretty well. I'd seen On Her Majesty's Secret Service. I thought he handled the fight scenes there okay, but of course they were very different from what we do."

Lazenby recalled "I was the only person on the set who really spoke English. I mean, I had an interpreter but the director didn't and my co-star didn't. It got a bit lonely."

== Release ==
In the end, The Shrine of Ultimate Bliss turned out to be one of the better martial arts films of the 1970s, not on par with Lee's films, but Lazenby's three films in the genre for Chow's Golden Harvest studios are probably the second best in the genre of that era after Lee's. Although without Lee and a large international release Shrine obviously fell short of the box office of Lee's previous two films. Nonetheless, The Shrine of Ultimate Bliss was very successful financially. No terms of what the film grossed worldwide were ever released by Golden Harvest or Run Run, but some journalist's estimates put it as high as $25 million worldwide, with another $10–$15 million worldwide in video revenue later on in the 1980s. Considering the film's cost and the fact that its initial theatrical release was very limited by number of countries and screens, that was an astonishing feat.

Whether the film actually took in around $25,000,000 worldwide at the box office (about $103,000,000 in today's money) is debatable, but what is not debatable is that within just two months of the film's release in Hong Kong, large production studios from both the UK and Australia were already in negotiation with Chow to co-produce Lazenby's next martial arts film, The Man From Hong Kong (1975), which Chow had already approved at the highest budget ever for a Hong Kong film or martial arts film, surpassing the previous record held by Enter the Dragon and Shrine. In fact, one UK production company wanted to co-produce Lazenby's next two films, just two months after Shrine's release. The Man From Hong Kong and A Queen's Ransom (1976), which was Lazenby's third Golden Harvest film were then both given large scale international theatrical releases, and Man From Hong Kong even had a wide US release the same year it was released in Hong Kong, something only Hong Kong films starring Bruce Lee had previously accomplished. So although The Shrine of Ultimate Bliss never turned out to be what it could have, it still was remarkably successful and it still holds firm as one of the all-time classic 1970s martial arts flicks.

On a side-note, Lazenby was reportedly paid (according to the Hong Kong and Australian presses at the time) US$220,000 to make The Shrine of Ultimate Bliss. The US$10,000 figure that imdb.com lists was actually his salary per week. Lazenby was paid $10,000 US per week for his acting, plus $1,000 US per week for expenses for a total of $11,000 US per week for each of his three Golden Harvest films. Each film covered about 20 weeks worth of work, so Lazenby earned $220,000 US per film. Only Bruce Lee commanded more in Hong Kong, earning $12,500 ($1,000 of it for living expenses) per week. After Lee died, Lazenby was the highest-paid actor in Hong Kong for the next three years, with his $11,000 per week salary. The next highest-paid actor in Hong Kong was Lazenby's co-star in The Man From Hong Kong and A Queen's Ransom, actor Jimmy Wang Yu, who earned a total salary of just $2,500 per week.

=== Critical reception ===
The Monthly Film Bulletin said directed Huang Feng "fails to coax anything out of this stock saga beyond the most rudimentary yarn-spinning" saying the movie was overly reminiscent of Deadly China Doll and that Lazenby was "lumpish".

The Kung Fu Movie Guide said the film "feels staggeringly disjointed: part paranoid psycho-sexual attack on free-love hippy culture; part US-style cop movie; part international spy film and part old school kung fu movie" adding that Lazenby "seems only partially aware of what’s going on during the film" but "although not the most graceful of fighters, he carries himself well under the complex demands of Sammo Hung‘s choreography."

== Notes ==
- Logan, Bey (1996). Hong Kong action cinema. Overlook Press. ISBN 9780879516635.
