= Essie Lin Chia =

Chinese actress

Essie Lin Chia (Chinese: 林嘉; born May 9, 1947) is a Chinese actress.

== Filmography ==
- Squadron 77 (1965)
- My Dream Boat (1967)
- The Million Eyes of Sumuru (1967)
- The Dragon Creek (1967)
- Three Swinging Girls (1968)
- Spring Blossoms (1968)
- Unfinished Melody (1969)
- Tropical Interlude (1969)
- The Singing Thief (1969)
- Return of the One-Armed Swordsman (1969)
- A Taste of Cold Steel (1970)
- Swordswomen Three (1970)
- Love Without End (1970)
- Love Styles XYZ (1971)
- Long Road To Freedom (1971)
- The Jade Faced Assassin (1971)
- Hotel Esquire (1971)
- Black and White Swordsman (1971)
- Doomsday Machine (1972)
- Black Samurai (1977)
- Pale Passion (1984)
