= Black and White Swordsman =

1971 Hong Kong film by Mo Man-hung

- 黑白雙俠
- Directed by: Mo Man-hung
- Written by: Mo Man-hung
- Produced by: Mo Man-hung
- Starring: Kong Ban; Chan Hung-lit; Essie Lin
- Release date: 1971
- Running time: 90 minutes
- Country: Hong Kong
- Language: Mandarin

Black and White Swordsman (黑白雙俠) is a 1971 Hong Kong wuxia film directed by Mo Man-hung, starring Kong Ban, Chan Hung-lit and Essie Lin.

== Cast ==
- Kong Ban
- Chan Hung-lit
- Essie Lin
- Chiao Lin
- Lee Kui-on
- Su Chen-ping
- Kwan Hung
- Wong Jun
- Mo Man-hung
- Shao Lo-hui

== New Version ==
by 2025–2026, the new version was deferent due to other new casts to commemorate the same title (alternate name: VMX's Maid's Obsession or/ 新黑白雙俠 Cantonese: san haak baak soeng hap. directed by: mitchel quinnesha Leung Siu Ou. starring Ivan Mei (眉芳) and others.
