= Carter Wong =

Hong Kong actor (born 1947)

- Born: Wong Chia-ta; March 22, 1947 (age 79); Portuguese Macau
- Occupations: Martial artist; actor
- Years active: 1972–present
- Spouse: Fanny

Chinese name
- Traditional Chinese: 黃家達
- Simplified Chinese: 黄家达
Transcriptions
Standard Mandarin
- Hanyu Pinyin: Huáng Jiādá
Yue: Cantonese
- Yale Romanization: Wong4 Ga1 Daat6
- Jyutping: Wong4 Gaa1 Daat6

Carter Huang Chia-ta (Chinese: 黃家達; Jyutping: Wong4 Gaa1 Daat6; March 22, 1947), commonly known as Carter Wong, is a Hong Kong actor, martial artist, and fight choreographer. He rose to fame for his roles in martial arts films produced by Golden Harvest Studios during the 1970s.

== Early life ==
Born Wong Chia-ta (黃家達) in Macau, he began training in martial arts at the age of 8, studying Northern Shaolin kung fu. He is well-versed in Baguazhang, karate, and aikido. He was also trained in hapkido by Hwang In-shik and Ji Han-jae for his role in the 1972 film Hapkido.

Prior to his acting career, Wong was a martial arts instructor for the Royal Hong Kong Police Force. Wong was brought to the attention of Golden Harvest producer Raymond Chow by his friend, Sammo Hung, who got him an audition.

== Career ==
Wong made his film debut in the 1972 film Hapkido, starring opposite Angela Mao and Sammo Hung. Positioned by Golden Harvest as a major breakout star, he played male leads opposite Mao in Deadly China Doll and When Taekwondo Strikes (both 1973). His other film roles include 18 Bronzemen (1976), Shaolin Traitorous (1976), Born Invincible (1978) and Big Trouble in Little China (1986). As an actor, he contributed to more than seventy martial arts films. He also worked as a stuntman, and was the fighting instructor for the movie Rambo III.

Wong is still active in martial arts, and founder of the Chung Hop Kuen Federation.

== Filmography ==
- Hap Ki Do (1972) as Kao Chung
- Deadly China Doll (1973) as Pai Chien
- When Taekwondo Strikes (1973) as Jin Zhengzhi
- Bruce Lee, the Man and the Legend (1973) as Himself
- Back Alley Princess (1973) as Chiang's eldest student
- The Tournament (1974) as Lau Siu-fung's brother
- The Skyhawk (1974) as Leo
- Naughty! Naughty! (1974) as Boss Feng's thug
- Kung Fu on the Bosporus (1974) as Captain Wong (new edit)
- 18 Shaolin Disciples (1975)
- The Seven Coffins (1975)
- The Association (1975) as policeman
- Hong Kong Superman (1975)
- The Dragon Tamers (1975) as Fang
- Dragon Gate (1975) as Chang Mao
- All in the Family (1975) as Policeman
- Marco Polo (1975) as Zu Jianmin
- Mutiny on the High Sea (1975)
- Heroes in the Late Ming Dynasty (1975) as Emperor
- Eight Hundred Heroes (1975) as Mr Wang
- 18 Bronzemen (1976) as Brother Wan
- Shaolin Kung Fu Mystagogue (1976) as Fang Shao-ching
- The Good, the Bad and the Loser (1976) as The Bad
- The Ming Patriots (1976)
- The Story of the Dragon (1976) as Mr Liu
- Shaolin Traitorous (1976) as Shang Yung
- Return of the 18 Bronzemen (1976) as Yong Zhen
- The Blazing Temple (1976)
- The Best of Shaolin Kung Fu (1976)
- The Last Battle of Yang Chao (1976) as Chu Chin-yeung
- The Invisible Terrorist (1976)
- The Shaolin Invincibles (1977) as Kan Feng-chih
- Princess and the Toxicant (1977)
- The Fatal Flying Guillotines (1977) as Shen Ping
- Shaolin Death Squads (1977)
- The Shaolin Kids (1977) as Shang Kuan-tung
- The Eight Masters (1977) as Chu Shiao-chieh
- Chivalrous Inn (1977)
- Killer from Above (1977) as Hsueh Ko-shu
- Heroes of the Eastern Skies (1977) as Japanese pilot
- The Shaolin Brothers (1977) as General Ko Lung-ta
- The Mysterious Heroes (1977) as Chu Tien-lung
- Shaolin Iron Finger (1977)
- The Rebel of Shao-Lin (1977) as Lei Pang-fei
- Super Kung Fu Fighter (1978)
- Snaky Knight Fight Against Mantis (1978) as Chan Sing-kwan
- Raging Tiger Vs. Monkey King (1978)
- Funny Kung Fu (1978) as Hsu Shi-chun
- Filthy Guy (1978)
- Born Invincible (1978) as Tieh Wu-ching
- Way of the Black Dragon (1978)
- Killer of Snake, Fox of Shaolin (1978) as wandering hero
- Magnificent Fist (1978)
- The Legendary Strike (1978) as Lord Yun
- The Magnificent (1979)
- Rage of the Dragon (1980) as Master Kwan
- Mr. Kwong Tung and the Robber (1980)
- The Luckiest Trio (1980) as Superintendent Wong
- The Furious Killer (1981)
- Gold Constables (1981)
- The Cold Blooded Murder (1981)
- Emperor of Shaolin Kung Fu (1981) as Tu, the butcher
- Interpol (1982)
- Blow Up (1982) as Red Skivvy
- Big Trouble in Little China (1986) as Thunder
- Hardcase and Fist (1988) as Eddy Lee
- Kickboxer the Champion (1990) (archive footage from The Magnificent)
- The Transmigration Romance (1991) as Mo Tsai
- The Way of the Lady Boxers (1992) as Captain Chiu Chie
- Sex for Sale (1993) as Huang
- Hope (1995) as office clerk in Canada
- Asian Cop: High Voltage (1995) as Police Officer
- Naked Angel (1996)
- Tiger Claws III: The Final Conflict (2000) as Master Jin
- One Arm Hero (2005) as Wong Ho
- Hero the Great (2005)
- The Stop Hit (2016) as Chief Chan Sing
- Monk Into the City (2017) as Shaolin Dashi
- Gung Fu, JKD & MMA (2019)

=== As fight director ===
- Raging Tiger Vs. Monkey King (1978)
- Magnificent Fist (1978)
- Sex for Sale (1993)
