= Hapkido (film) =

1972 Hong Kong film by Huang Feng

- Directed by: Huang Feng
- Written by: Ho Jen
- Produced by: Raymond Chow
- Starring: Angela Mao; Carter Wong; Sammo Hung; Jackie Chan; Yuen Biao; Corey Yuen
- Cinematography: Danny Lee
- Edited by: Peter Cheung
- Music by: Lai Shu-Hua
- Distributed by: Golden Harvest
- Release date: October 12, 1972
- Running time: 92 minutes
- Country: Hong Kong
- Language: Mandarin

Hapkido (Chinese: 合氣道), released as Lady Kung Fu in North America, is a 1972 Hong Kong martial arts film directed by Huang Feng and starring Angela Mao. The film co-stars Carter Wong and Sammo Hung, and has early cameo appearances from Jackie Chan, Yuen Biao and Corey Yuen. It was released by Golden Harvest.

== Plot ==
It is 1934, in Japanese occupied Korea. Yu Ying, Kao Chang and Fan Wei are sitting and talking in a park when they are approached by a group of Japanese toughs. The leader of the Japanese begins to make unwelcome advances, and Yu Ying tries her best to ignore him. Fan Wei loses his temper and a melee ensues. These three have just graduated, learning the art of Hapkido and they return to China in the hopes of setting up their own school, which they do. The Japanese, who consider it an inferior martial art, try to run them out of town with some traitorous Chinese, including Chou Ba-tien. Yu Ying, Kao Chang and Fan Wei do not want any trouble as it goes against the wishes of their master and his teachings. It is Fan Wei who finally loses it after being insulted by some Japanese. This does not go down well and Fan Wei becomes a wanted man, having to hide out while Yu Ying and Kao Chang try to reason with The Black Bear Gang without much luck. Finally the Japanese go too far, killing both Kao Chang and Fan Wei, which forces Yu Ying to fight back along with her Hapkido Elder Brother, killing the leaders of the Black Bear Gang.

== Cast ==
- Angela Mao as Yu Ying
- Carter Wong as Kao Chang
- Sammo Hung as Fan Wei
- Wong In Sik as Elder classmate
- Ji Han Jae as Teacher Shih Kung-chan
- Pai Ying as Chou Ba-tien
- Nancy Sit as Hsiao Hsiu
- Goro Kumon as Toyoda Yaguma (Nihongo: 豊田矢車, Yaguma Toyota)
- Ping-Ao Wei as Chang Pu-tse
- Lan Sun as Sung Chung
- Di Chin as Hsiao Lao-fu
- Wei Yang as Traitor
- Bruce Leung as Hu Chia
- Ka Ting Lee as Chief disciple

== Reception ==
In September 1973, the film topped the North American box office, briefly overtaking the Bruce Lee blockbuster Enter the Dragon, which eventually regained the top spot several weeks later. It was digitally re-mastered and restored by Hong Kong Legends in 2006.
