= The Fast Sword =

1971 Hong Kong film by Huang Feng

- Directed by: Huang Feng
- Written by: Huang Feng
- Starring: Chang Yi.
- Release date: 1971
- Country: Hong Kong
- Language: Mandarin

The Fast Sword (Chinese: 奪命金劍) is a 1971 Hong Kong action film directed by Huang Feng. The film stars Chang Yi and Wong Chung Shun.

The film was shown in France and Germany.

== Plot ==
Chang Yi and his sister, Hon Seung Kam, live on their farm with their blind mother Wang Li. Their father was murdered by Wong Tung Shung. Seeking revenge when he learns his father's killer has returned, he finds himself arrested at attempting to avenge his father's death. Informing the officer who arrested him they join forces and finally bring the evil warlord to justice in an expensive fruit battle.

== Cast ==
- Chang Yi
- Hon Seung Kam
- Sammo Hung
- Shih Chun
- Wong Chung Shun
- Miu Tin
- Yee Yuen
- Wang Lai
- Lui Jun
- Lee Ka Ting
