= Shaolin Traitorous =

1976 Hong Kong film by Sung Ting-mei

- 大太監
- Directed by: Sung Ting-mei
- Screenplay by: Chang Hsin-Yi
- Produced by: Yen Wu-tung
- Starring: Carter Wong; Shang-kuan Ling-feng; Chang Yi; Sammo Hung
- Cinematography: Chen Hay-lock
- Edited by: Huang Chiu-kuei; Siu Nam
- Music by: Stanley Chow
- Production company: Fortuna Films
- Release date: 23 July 1976 (Hong Kong)
- Running time: 90 minutes
- Country: Hong Kong
- Language: Mandarin

Shaolin Traitorous (大太監), also known as The Traitorous, is a 1976 Hong Kong wuxia film directed by Sung Ting-mei, starring Carter Wong, Shang-kuan Ling-feng, Chang Yi, and Sammo Hung.

== Synopsis ==
The film is set in 17th-century China during the Ming dynasty when the corrupt court eunuch Wei Zhongxian holds sway over the imperial government. Tian Ergeng, one of the eunuch's close aides, is put in charge of dongchang (a spy agency) and the jinyiwei (secret police), and tasked with eliminating those who oppose his master.

The upright official Yang Lian and his father write a memorial to the emperor to call out Wei Zhongxian for his crimes. In retaliation, Wei issues a fake imperial decree to demote the Yangs to commoner status. A year later, he sends Tian Ergeng to lead dongchang and jinyiwei agents to murder the Yang family. Yang Shangyong, Yang Lian's son, survives and takes shelter in Shaolin Monastery, where he is assigned to work in the kitchen and learns martial arts from his master.

After ten years of training, Yang leaves Shaolin and encounters the jinyiwei, who are attacking another upright official Chen Wenrui and his family. He fends off the jinyiwei and reveals himself as Yang Lian's son. When Tian Ergeng learns about it, he sends his goddaughter Xiaoyun to arrest Yang Shangyong. Yang and Xiaoyun fight, and Yang manages to escape. Later, the jinyiwei commander personally leads his men to kill the Chens, but Yang shows up to save them and kills the commander.

Tian orders the dongchang's first chief and Xiaoyun to lead his men to kill Yang. However, Xiaoyun has fallen in love with Yang, so she secretly helps him defeat the dongchang agents. It turns out that Xiaoyun's real name is Zuo Yunlan, and she is Zuo Guangdou's daughter. Her father, who had opposed Wei Zhongxian, had been arrested and tortured to death, while she had been saved by Sima Kang, a family friend who had sacrificed himself to help her gain Tian's trust and become Tian's goddaughter. All this time, Zuo has grown up in dongchang and learnt martial arts while waiting for a chance to avenge her father. In the end, Zuo and Yang team up to defeat and kill Tian, finally avenging their families.

== Cast ==
- Carter Wong as Yang Shangyong
  - Lin Xiaohu as Yang Shangyong (child)
- Shang-kuan Ling-feng as Xiaoyun / Zuo Yunlan
- Chang Yi as Tian Ergeng
- Sammo Hung as the Dongchang first chief
- Chan Pooi-ling as Yang Shangyong's mother
- Hsieh Hsing as Yang Shangyong's grandfather
- Kwan Hung as Yang Lian
- Huang Fei-lung as the Jinyiwei commander
- Kao Pei-chun as a Shaolin monk
- Li Chen as the Shaolin abbot
- Lee Ying as the Shaolin kitchen monk
- Ge Pao as the Dongchang second chief
- Chang Pao-shan as Chen Wenrui
- Chang Ping-ping as Chen Wenrui's wife
- Shen Shih-hua as Chen Wenrui's daughter
- Hsieh Chih-ming as Quanfu
- Wang Chang-shih as Sima Kang
