= The Eunuch =

1971 Hong Kong film by Teddy Yip

- DVD cover art
- 鬼太監
- Directed by: Teddy Yip
- Written by: Lo Wei
- Produced by: Runme Shaw
- Starring: Pai Ying; Lisa Chiao Chiao
- Cinematography: Charles Tung; Yau Kei
- Edited by: Chiang Hsing-lung
- Music by: Stanley Chow
- Production company: Shaw Brothers Studio
- Distributed by: Shaw Brothers Studio
- Release date: 12 May 1971
- Running time: 105 minutes
- Country: Hong Kong
- Language: Mandarin

The Eunuch (鬼太監) is a 1971 Hong Kong wuxia film directed by Teddy Yip, starring Pai Ying and Lisa Chiao Chiao.

== Synopsis ==
Gui Dehai is an influential court eunuch who holds sway over the imperial government. He causes the downfall of the Prince of Chu, a noble who opposes him, and attempts to have the prince's entire family exterminated too. Zhu Jin, the prince's son, survives with the help of an elderly couple and learns martial arts from them with the aim of avenging his family.

Before becoming a eunuch, Gui Dehai had fathered a daughter, Yanyan. After rising to power, he attempted to cover up his background by sending assassins to kill Yanyan and her mother. Yanyan is saved by the same elderly couple who rescued Zhu Jin. As they spend time together, Zhu Jin and Yanyan gradually fall in love with each other.

When Zhu Jin finally confronts Gui Dehai and learns the truth about Yanyan, her father attempts to turn her against Zhu Jin.

== Cast ==
- Pai Ying as Gui Dehai
- Lisa Chiao Chiao as Yanyan
- Chung Wa as Zhu Jin
- Yeung Chi-hing as Gongsun Bo
- Wang Hsieh as Ye Zisong
- Lo Wei as the Prince of Chu
- Ouyang Sha-fei as the Princess Consort of Chu
- Wong Chung-shun as Liu Guosheng
