= Joseph Kuo =

Chinese film director

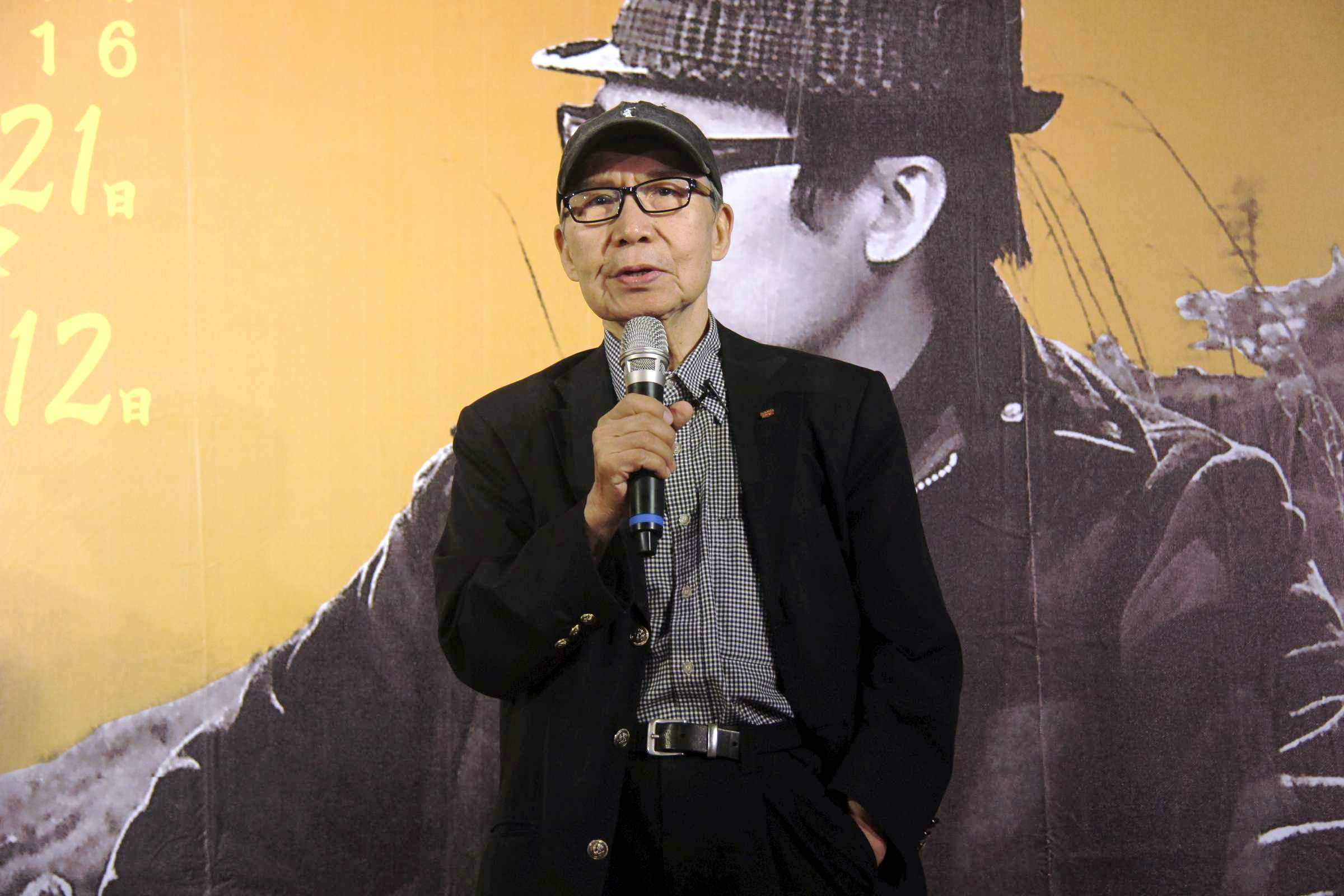
Joseph Kuo in 2016

Joseph Nan-Hong Kuo (Chinese: 郭南宏; Kaohsiung, 20 July 1935) is a Taiwanese film director best known for his Hong Kong-based kung fu films of the 1970s and 1980s.

His debut screenplay Ghost Lake was one of the earliest Taiwanese-language films. He later reshot the film.

== Selected filmography ==
- Ghost Lake (鬼湖 Gui Hu), 1958 (screenplay only)
- Dragon Palace of Pu Island, 1962
- The Swordsman of All Swordsmen, 1968
- Son of Swordsman, 1970
- Jian nu you hun (Mission Impossible), 1971
- The Mighty One, 1971
- Triangular Duel, 1972
- Rikisha Kuri, 1973
- Chinese Iron Man, 1973
- Deadly Fists Kung Fu, 1974
- Shaolin Kung Fu, 1974
- Shaolin Kids, 1975
- 18 Bronzemen, 1975
- The Blazing Temple, 1976
- Return of the 18 Bronzemen, 1976
- The 8 Masters, 1976
- 7 Grandmasters, 1977
- Born Invincible, 1978
- The World of Drunken Master, 1979
- The Mystery of Chess Boxing, 1979
- The Old Master, 1979
- 36 Deadly Styles, 1979
- Unbeaten 28, 1980
- Shaolin Temple Strikes Back, 1981
- Five Venoms vs Wu Tang, 1988 (producer only)

== Personal life ==
Joseph Kuo married his first wife in the year 1971. In 1972, his daughter, Jennifer Kuo, was born and in 1974, twins Steven and Stanley Kuo were born. He was divorced from his first wife in 1980 and went on to marry two more times. Jennifer went on to marry David Kott and have two children, Camille and Danielle. Steven and Stanley started their own families as well and have minimal contact with their father. Jennifer, on the other hand, has had no contact with her father in years.
