= The Crimson Charm =

1971 Hong Kong film by Huang Feng

- 血符門
- Directed by: Huang Feng
- Written by: Huang Feng
- Produced by: Runme Shaw
- Starring: Ivy Ling; Chang Yi; Shih Szu
- Cinematography: Danny Lee
- Edited by: Chiang Hsing-lung
- Music by: Wang Fu-ling
- Production company: Shaw Brothers Studio
- Distributed by: Shaw Brothers Studio
- Release date: 16 July 1971
- Country: Hong Kong
- Language: Mandarin

The Crimson Charm (血符門) is a 1971 Hong Kong wuxia film directed by Huang Feng and produced by the Shaw Brothers Studio.

== Synopsis ==
Jiang Zichao, the master of a swordsman clan, takes his daughter Jiang Shangqing with him to roam the jianghu. After fighting injustice on one occasion, they end up becoming enemies with the evil Crimson Charm Clan. After the Crimson Charm Clan kills the Jiangs, the surviving members of the swordsman clan – Han Yu and Yu Fangfang – vow to destroy the Crimson Charm Clan and avenge their fellow swordsmen.

== Cast ==
- Ivy Ling as Yu Fangfang
- Chang Yi as Han Yu
- Shih Szu as Jiang Shangqing
- James Nam as Linghu Lei
- Wang Hsieh as Cao Gang
- Fang Mien as Jiang Zichao
- Ku Feng as Lin Sanhu
- Hung Lau as Guo Shaowei
