= A Queen's Ransom =

1976 Hong Kong film by Ting Shan-hsi

- Film poster
- Traditional Chinese: 鱷潭群英會
- Simplified Chinese: 鳄潭群英会
- Hanyu Pinyin: È Tán Qún Yīng Huì
- Jyutping: Ngok6 Taam6 Kwan4 Jing1 Wui2
- Directed by: Ting Shan-hsi
- Screenplay by: Ting Shan-hsi
- Produced by: Raymond Chow
- Starring: Jimmy Wang Yu; Angela Mao; George Lazenby; Judith Brown; Ko Chun-hsiung; Charles Heung; Dean Shek
- Cinematography: Chris Chen Ching-Chu
- Edited by: Peter Cheung
- Music by: Stanley Chow
- Production company: Golden Harvest
- Distributed by: Golden Harvest
- Release date: 16 September 1976
- Running time: 96 minutes
- Country: Hong Kong
- Language: Mandarin
- Box office: HK$553,290.10

A Queen's Ransom (Chinese: 鱷潭群英會), also known as The International Assassin, is a 1976 Hong Kong action film about a plot to assassinate Queen Elizabeth II. The film was written and directed by Ting Shan-hsi and starred Jimmy Wang Yu, Angela Mao, George Lazenby, Judith Brown, Ko Chun-hsiung, Charles Heung and Dean Shek, whom also serves as the film's assistant director.

== Plot ==
During Queen Elizabeth II's visit to Hong Kong in 1975, a group of criminals plan her assassination.

== Cast ==
- Jimmy Wang Yu as Jimmy Viet Cong Guerilla
- Angela Mao as Maria Cambodian Martial Artist & A Commy
- George Lazenby as Morgan
- Judith Brown as Black Rose
- Ko Chun-hsiung as Police chief Gao The Detective
- Charles Heung as Police detective Karate Master
- Dean Shek as Duck Egg
- Tien Ni as Jenny
- Chan Pei-shan as Miyamoto Japanese Red Army Triggerman
- Bolo Yeung as Ram Thai Bodybuilder.
- Hao Li-jen as Ducky's uncle
- Hon Yee-sang as Cambodian
- Cheung King-po as Bandit
- Wong Sam as Police department
- Peter Chan as Chen Lung
- Chu Tit-wo as Police detective
- Helen Poon as Gao's wife
- Wu Jiaxiang
- Luk Chuen as Princess' guard who fights with shark
- Ling Hon as Policeman
- Wan Leng-kwong as Policeman
- Dabid Chung as Noda
- Han Ying-chieh as Princess' guard with sword
- Yue Man-wa as Police detective
- Cheung Siu-lun
- Sze-ma Wah-lung
- Kong Chuen

== Production ==
Taiwanese director Ting Shan-hsi was hired by Golden Harvest off the back of his successful film, Everlasting Glory (1976).

It was the last of three films George Lazenby made for Golden Harvest, the others being Stoner and The Man from Hong Kong.
