= The Angry River =

1971 Hong Kong film by Huang Feng

- Directed by: Huang Feng
- Written by: Huang Feng
- Produced by: Huang Feng
- Distributed by: Golden Harvest
- Release date: 12 May 1971
- Country: Hong Kong
- Language: Mandarin

The Angry River (Chinese title: 鬼怒川) is a 1971 Hong Kong fantasy action film directed by Huang Feng. It was the first film produced by Golden Harvest.

== Plot ==
Lan Tin-lung, master of the Liangyi Castle, calls upon all upright swordsmen to help wipe out the notorious Lunar Sect. But he is soon fatally wounded by the Sect's leader nicknamed King Hell. Lan's daughter, Lan Feng, sets out to find a precious herb capable of curing her dying father. The herb she eventually gets, leading her to a series of hectic confrontations with those who also covet the priceless medicine. She befriends Leng Yu-han, who saves her from being molested by a wicked man, Ma Ga Tueng, who is of the Hua Shan School. Lan Feng returns home to find the entire castle in an aftermath of the attack by Lunar Sect. Her father is among the dead. In a fit of despair, she swallows up the herb, and her ability tremendously strengthens up instantly. With Leng's help, she storms the stronghold of the Lunar Sect. King Hell is killed in the battle finally.

== Cast ==
- Chang I Fei
- Chiang Nan
- Feng Yi
- Han Ying Chieh
- Sammo Hung
- Kao Yuan
- Lam Ching Ying
- Angela Mao Ying
- Pai Ying
- Jackie Chan
- Tommy Lee Gam Hing
