= Brothers Five =

1970 Hong Kong film by Lo Wei

- Film poster
- 五虎屠龍
- Directed by: Lo Wei
- Written by: Ni Kuang; Lo Wei
- Produced by: Runme Shaw
- Cinematography: Wu Cho-hua
- Edited by: Chiang Hsing-lung
- Music by: Wang Fu-ling
- Production company: Shaw Brothers Studio
- Distributed by: Shaw Brothers Studio
- Release date: 26 March 1970
- Running time: 109 minutes
- Country: Hong Kong
- Language: Mandarin

Brothers Five (五虎屠龍) is a 1970 Hong Kong wuxia film directed by Lo Wei and produced by the Shaw Brothers Studio.

== Synopsis ==
Five brothers of the Gao family were separated at birth when their father was murdered by the evil master of Flying Dragon Villa. Their caretaker left scars on the backs of their left hands so that they will be able to identify each other in the future and reunite to avenge their father. Yan Lai, the daughter of a family friend of the Gaos, finds the brothers and joins them in their quest.

== Cast ==
- Cheng Pei-pei as Yan Lai
- Lo Lieh as Gao Xia
- Chang Yi as Gao Zhi
- Elliot Ngok as Gao Wei
- Chin Han as Gao Hao
- Kao Yuen as Gao Yong
- Tien Feng as Long Zhenfeng
- Unicorn Chan as "Flying Fork" Wang
- Wang Hsieh as Wang Liao'er
- Sammo Hung as Brother Zhu
- Ku Feng as Wan Bufu
- James Tien as Ding Zhishan
- Nam Wai-lit as Li Xiaosan
