= Huang Feng =

Chinese filmmaker and actor (born 1919)

- Born: 7 January 1919; Hefei, Anhui, China
- Occupations: Actor, martial artist, director, producer, action choreographer, screenwriter, film presenter, adult film director
- Years active: 1967–1980

Huang Feng (黃楓) (born 7 January 1919) was a Chinese-born Hong Kong–based film director, screenwriter and actor.

Huang was a native of Hefei, Anhui, China. He started his career as an actor, then became a screenwriter and assistant director, before being promoted to a director by Raymond Chow. He is credited with discovering martial artist and actress Angela Mao. Huang announced his retirement in 1980.

== Filmography ==
- Frosty Night (1957) (writer)
- A Marriage for Love (1957) (writer)
- Appointment After Dark (1958) (writer)
- Lady Jade Locket (1967) (writer)
- The Crimson Charm (1970) (director, writer)
- The Angry River (1970) (director)
- The Fast Sword (1971) (director, writer)
- The Jade-faced Assassin (1971) (writer)
- Lady Whirlwind (1972) (director)
- Bandits from Shantung (1972) (director, writer)
- The Opium Trail (1972) (director)
- Hapkido (1972) (director)
- Kickmaster (1973) (writer)
- When Taekwondo Strikes (1973) (director)
- Stoner (1974) (director, writer)
- The Tournament (1974) (director)
- The Himalayan (1975) (director)
- Shaolin Plot (1977) (director)
- The Iron-Fisted Monk (1977) (writer)
- Naked Comes the Huntress (1978) (director, writer)
- The Legendary Strike (1978) (director)
- The Cunning Hustler (1978) (director)
- The Last Judgement (1979) (director)
