= Bandits from Shantung =

1972 Hong Kong film by Huang Feng

- Special edition DVD cover art
- 山東響馬
- Directed by: Huang Feng
- Written by: Huang Feng
- Produced by: Raymond Chow
- Starring: Chang Yi; Pai Ying; Hu Chin; Tien Mi; Yee Yuen; Sammo Hung
- Cinematography: Danny Lee
- Edited by: Han Chiang
- Music by: Wang Fu-ling
- Production company: Golden Harvest
- Release date: 3 March 1972
- Country: Hong Kong
- Language: Mandarin

Bandits From Shantung (山東響馬) is a 1972 Hong Kong wuxia film directed by Huang Feng.

== Synopsis ==
A gang of bandits led by An Rulong have been killing and robbing people in Shandong (Shantung). Yan Tieyi, a wandering martial artist, returns to a town to find his girlfriend Tie Lingling. After witnessing a few of the bandits committing atrocities, he intervenes and kills them all except one.

When Tie Lingling is captured by the bandits, Yan Tieyi lures them into a trap and defeats all of them, killing An Rulong. Yan Tieyi and Tie Lingling are then married, and peace is restored in the area.

== Cast ==
- Chang Yi as Yan Tieyi
- Hu Chin as Shi Lianhua
- Pai Ying as An Rulong
- Tien Mi as Tie Lingling
- Yee Yuen as the second bandit
- Sammo Hung as the fifth bandit
