= Harry Saltzman: Showman =

- Release date: 2000
- Country: United States
- Language: English

Harry Saltzman: Showman is a promotional featurette about producer Harry Saltzman, containing interviews with surviving film professionals of the first 9 James Bond production crews as well as with Saltzman's family. Produced by MGM, it is included on DVD releases of that company's From Russia with Love.
