= Lady Whirlwind =

1972 Hong Kong film by Huang Feng

- Directed by: Huang Feng
- Written by: Huang Feng
- Produced by: Raymond Chow
- Starring: Angela Mao
- Distributed by: Golden Harvest
- Release date: 1972
- Country: Hong Kong
- Language: Mandarin
- Budget: US$1.1 million+

Lady Whirlwind a.k.a. Deep Thrust (Chinese: 鐵掌旋風腿) is a 1972 Hong Kong martial arts film written and directed by Huang Feng, starring Angela Mao.

== Plot ==
A young man Ling Shih-hua (Chang Yi) is severely beaten by Japanese mobsters and left for dead on the beach. He is nursed back to health by a pretty young girl, and he vows to take revenge on the criminals. Meanwhile, Miss Tien Li-Chun (Angela Mao) comes to town with a score to settle with Ling. Apparently, her sister was jilted by Ling and she killed herself, so Tien must avenge her by taking his life. Ling begs her to spare him until after he gets his revenge, to which she reluctantly agrees. When he gets mercilessly beaten by his enemies, Tien saves him as she cannot allow him to die by someone else's hand. As Tien waits for Ling Shih-hua to recover so she can beat him, he runs into an old man who teaches him the art of tai chi. This gives him the edge he needs, and he finally kills the leader of the gang. Angela jumps in to take her revenge, but Ling's girlfriend throws herself between them and begs for mercy. Tien spares his life.

== Cast ==
- Chang Yi - Ling Shi-hua
- Angela Mao – Miss Tien Li-Chun
- Pai Ying - Tung Ku
- Oh Kyung-Ah - Hsuang Hsuang
- Liu Ah-Na - Tiao Ta Niang
- Chin Yuet-Sang - Wen Tien
- Sammo Hung - Tiao Ta Niang's brother
- Kim Nam-il - Tang Sek Ping
- Yeung Wai - Thug
- Wong Fung - Casino dealer
- Law Kei - Thug
- Cham Siu-Hung - Thug
- Bruce Leung Siu-Lung - Thug (Kicker)
- Alan Chui Chung-San - Thug
- Wong Chi-Ming - Thug
- Leung Pasan - Thug
- Jang Jeong-Kuk - Thug
- Wilson Tong - Thug
- Chui Hing-Chun - Thug
- Yeung Wah - Thug
- Tong Kam-Tong Thug
- Choi Min Kyu - Thug

== Box office ==
The film grossed HK$401,794 ($71,222) in Hong Kong. Overseas in the United States and Europe, the film grossed millions of US dollars. This adds up to at least more than US$1,100,000 (equivalent to $8,500,000 in 2025) grossed in Hong Kong and Western territories.
