= List of Golden Harvest productions =

List of Golden Harvest productions, per the official Golden Harvest website.

1970 - 1971 - 1972 - 1973 - 1974 - 1975 - 1976 - 1977 - 1978 - 1979

1980 - 1981 - 1982 - 1983 - 1984 - 1985 - 1986 - 1987 - 1988 - 1989

1990 - 1991 - 1992 - 1993 - 1994 - 1995 - 1996 - 1997 - 1998 - 1999

2000 - 2001 - 2002 - 2003 -

2010 - 2014 - 2015 -

== 1970 ==
- The Angry River (鬼怒川)
- The Last Duel (俠義雙雄)
- The Invincible Eight (天龍八將)

== 1971 ==
- The Blade Spares None (刀不留人)
- The Fast Sword (奪命金劍)
- Thunderbolt (五雷轟頂)
- The Comet Strikes (鬼流星)
- The Chase (追擊)
- The Invincible Sword (一夫當關)
- The Big Boss (唐山大兄)

== 1972 ==
- Beach of the War Gods (戰神灘)
- Deadly China Doll
- Bandits from Shantung (山東響馬)
- The Hurricane (金旋風)
- Lady Whirlwind (鐵掌旋風腿)
- One Armed Boxer (獨臂拳王)
- Sonny Come Home (拳頭枕頭)
- Stormy Sun (烈日狂風)
- Fist of Fury (精武門)
- The Man Called Tiger (冷面虎)
- Way of the Dragon (猛龍過江)
- Hapkido (合氣道)
- Four Winds (東南西北風)
- Seven Magnificent Fights (海員七號)

== 1973 ==
- Girl of the Night (夜女郎)
- The Fate of Lee Khan (迎春閣之風波)
- The Unscrupulous General (糊塗大將軍)
- The Story of Daisy (心蘭的故事)
- Back Alley Princess (馬路小英雄)
- Game of Death (死亡遊戲)
- The Devil's Treasure (黑夜怪客)
- Kung Fu Girl (鐵娃)
- Enter the Dragon (龍爭虎鬥)

== 1974 ==
- When Taekwondo Strikes (跆拳震九州)
- The Queen Bee (女王蜂)
- The Tattooed Dragon (龍虎金剛)
- The Skyhawk (黃飛鴻少林拳)
- Whiplash (虎辮子)
- Bruce Lee: The Man & the Legend (李小龍的生與死)
- Tiger of Northland (北地虎)
- The Shrine of Ultimate Bliss aka Stoner (鐵金剛大破紫陽觀)
- The Manchu Boxer (七省拳王)
- Shaolin Boxers (福建少林拳)
- Chinatown Capers (小英雄大鬧唐人街)
- Slaughter in San Francisco (黃面老虎)
- Naughty! Naughty! (綽頭狀元)

== 1975 ==
- The Bedevilled (心魔)
- Badge 369 (三六九)
- The Dragon Tamers (女子跆拳群英會)
- The Association (艷窟神探)
- The Young Dragons (鐵漢柔情)
- The Tournament (中泰拳壇生死戰)
- All in the Family (花飛滿城春)

== 1976 ==
- Games Gamblers Play (鬼馬雙星)
- The Man from Hong Kong (直搗黃龍)
- The Seven Coffin (驅魔女)
- Naughtier Than Three (綽頭皇上皇)
- My Wacky, Wacky World (大千世界)
- No End of Surprises (拍案驚奇)
- The Last Message (天才與白痴)

== 1977 ==
- Hand of Death (少林門)
- A Queen's Ransom (鱷譚群英會)
- The Himalayan (密宗聖手)
- The Double Crossers (鬼計雙雄)
- Spring Time in Pattaya (春滿巴堤雅)
- Confession of a Concubine (宮人我要)
- Princess Chang Ping (帝女花)
- Chelsia, My Love (秋霞)
- Elmo Takes a Bride (阿茂正傳)
- Gonna Get You (溫拿與教叔)

== 1978 ==
- The Amsterdam Kill
- The Boys in Company C
- Game of Death (死亡遊戲)
- The Private Eyes (半斤八兩)
- The Shaolin Plot (四大門派)
- The Iron-Fisted Monk (三德和尚與舂米六)
- Broken Oath (破戒)
- The Lady Killer (鬼馬姑爺仔)
- Naked Comes the Huntress (貂女)
- Rainbow in My Heart (第二度道彩虹)
- Making It (追趕跑跳碰)
- Money Crazy (發錢寒)
- Ironside 426 (四二六)
- Follow the Star (大煞星與小鬼頭)

== 1979 ==
- The Contract (賣身契)
- Mr. Big (大路元帥)
- Warriors Two (贊先生與找錢華)
- Itchy Fingers (神偷妙探手多多)
- Hello, Late Homecomers (Hello ! 夜歸人)
- Vice Squad 633 (六三三)
- The Hellfire Angel (亡命嬌娃)
- Last Hurrah for Chivalry (豪俠)
- Payoff (毒計)
- Knockabout (雜家小子)
- Tower of Death (死亡塔)
- The Cheeky Chap (壞小子)
- Magnificent Butcher (林世榮)
- The Young Master (師弟出馬)

== 1980 ==
- Murder Most Foul (慌失失)
- The Sword (名劍)
- The Happenings (夜車)
- From Riches to Rags (錢作怪)
- Gallery of Fools (哥門的糗事)
- The Phantom Killer (粉骷髏)
- The Mortal Storm (風塵)
- Spooky Encounters (鬼打鬼)
- Security Unlimited (摩登保鑣)
- Dreadnaught (勇者無懼)
- The Breakthrough (衝破黑漩渦)
- Once Upon A Time (舊夢不須記)
- Wedding Bells, Wedding Belles (公子嬌)
- Dragon Lord (龍少爺)
- The Big Brawl (殺手壕)

== 1981 ==
- The Cannonball Run (English production)
- Death Hunt
- The Postman Fights Back (巡城馬)
- Super Fool (龍咁威)
- The Prodigal Son (敗家仔)
- The Hired Guns (凶蠍)
- The Miracle Fighters (奇門遁甲)
- Tower of Death (死亡塔)
- Sweet Vengeance (復仇者)
- To Hell with the Devil (摩登天師)
- Duel to the Death (生死決)
- The Dead and the Deadly (人嚇人)
- Plain Jane to the Rescue (八彩林亞珍)
- Zu Warriors from the Magic Mountain (蜀生)
- The Trail (追鬼七雄)

== 1982 ==
- Project A (A計劃)
- Hocus Pocus (人嚇鬼)
- Winners and Sinners (奇謀妙計五福星)
- Profile in Anger (無名火)
- Megaforce
- Deadly Eyes
- Teppanyaki (鐵板燒)
- The Body Is Willing (狂情)
- Lost Generation (風水廿年)
- Pom Pom (神勇雙響炮)
- And Now, What's Your Name? (先生貴姓)

== 1983 ==
- Long Arm of the Law (省港旗兵)
- Big Mouth C.I.D (摩登捕快)
- Hero Shed No Tears (英雄無淚)
- Wheels on Meals (快餐車)
- Fingers on Triggers (夾心沙展)
- The Disciples of Shaolin (少林俗家弟子)
- Bruce Lee, the Legend (李小龍生與死)
- Winner Takes All (有Friend冇驚)
- Hong Kong 1941 (等待黎明)
- Those Merry Souls (時來運轉)
- High Road to China
- The Champions (波牛)

== 1984 ==
- Cannonball Run II (English production)
- Funny Triple (開心三嚮炮)
- Lassiter
- Rosa (神勇雙嚮炮續集)
- My Lucky Stars (福星高照)
- Affectionately Yours (花仔多情)
- Merry Go Round (鬼馬朱唇)
- Police Story (警察故事)
- Mr. Heavenly Lover (我的愛神)
- Crazy Romance (求愛反斗星)
- Mr. Vampire (殭屍先生)
- Heart of Dragon (龍的心)
- Witch from Nepal (奇緣)
- Death Wish (死亡之愿)

== 1985 ==
- Seven Angels (歡場)
- Twinkle, Twinkle Lucky Stars (夏日福星)
- Strange Bedfellow (兩公婆八條心)
- Armour of God (龍兄虎弟)
- Goodbye Mammie (再見媽咪)
- Young But Angry (青春怒潮)
- Why, Why, Tell Me Why (壞女孩)
- Happy Ding Dong (歡樂叮噹)
- My Cousin, the Ghost (表哥到)
- Naughty Boys (扭計離牌軍)
- Bitter Taste of Blood (亡命天涯)
- The Final Test (最後一戰)
- Midnight Girls (午夜麗人)
- The Seventh Curse (原振俠與衛斯理)
- The Protector (威龍猛探)

== 1986 ==
- Lucky Stars Go Places (最佳福星)
- Happy Go Lucky (開心快活人)
- That Enchanting Night (良宵花弄月)
- A Hearty Response (義蓋雲天)
- Righting Wrongs (執法先鋒)
- Scared Stiff (小生夢驚魂)
- Mr. Vampire II (殭屍家族)
- Chaos by Design (愛情謎語)
- Midnight Whisper (盡訴心中情)
- Millionaire's Express (富貴列車)
- Paper Marriage (過埠新娘)
- The Happy Bigamist (一屋兩妻)
- Immortal Story (海上花)
- The Scalper (母牛一條)
- The Yesman (跟屁蟲)
- Gallery of Fools (哥們的糗事)

== 1987 ==
- Chocolate Inspector (神探朱古力)
- The Haunted Cop Shop (猛鬼差館)
- China's Last Eunuch (中國最後一個太監)
- Sworn Brothers (肝膽相照)
- Miss Hong Kong (香港小姐寫真)
- Breadline Blues (母牛一條)
- Killer's Nocturne (不夜天)
- Eastern Condors (東方禿鷹)
- Project A Part II (A計劃續集)
- Flaming Brothers (江湖龍虎鬥)
- The Big Brother (一哥)
- Promising Young Boy (OK仔)
- Rouge (胭脂扣)
- The Inspector Wears Skirts (霸王花)

== 1988 ==
- Long Arm of the Law II (省港旗兵續集)
- To Err Is Humane (標錯參)
- Spiritual Love (鬼新娘)
- Three Against the World (群龍奪寶)
- Profile of Pleasure (群鶯亂舞)
- Tokyo Doll (東京俏姑娘)
- Mr. Vampire III (靈幻道士)
- Couples, Couples, Couples (三對鴛鴦一張床)
- One Husband Too Many (一妻兩夫)
- Femme Fatale (最毒婦人心)
- Painted Faces (七小福)
- Picture of a Nymph (畫中仙)
- Lady Reporter (師姐大晒)
- Her Vengeance (血玫瑰)
- Dragons Forever (飛龍猛將)

== 1989 ==
- Moon, Stars & Sun (月亮、星星、太陽)
- Police Story Part II (警察故事續集)
- On the Run (亡命鴛鴦)
- Mr. Vampire IV (殭屍叔叔)
- The Greatest Lover (公子多情)
- Vampire Vs. Vampire (一眉道人)
- Peacock King (孔雀王子)
- The Bachelor's Swan Song (再見王老五)
- Jail House Eros (監嶽不設防)
- Four Loves (四千金)
- Burning Sensation (火燭鬼)
- The Inspector Wears Skirts II (神勇飛虎霸王花)
- Sentenced To Hang (三狼奇案)

== 1990 ==
- Teenage Mutant Ninja Turtles (English production)
- Mr Canton and Lady Rose (奇蹟)
- I Am Sorry (說謊的女人)
- Reincarnation of Golden Lorus (潘金蓮之前世今生)
- The Yuppie Fantasia (小男人週記)
- In Between Loves (求愛夜驚魂)
- Mr. Smart (瀟洒先生)
- The Iceman Cometh (急凍奇俠)
- Sentenced to Hang (三狼奇案)
- She Shoots Straight (皇家女將)
- Forever Young (返老還童)
- A Fishy Story (不脫襪的人)
- What a Small World (我愛唐人街)
- Doctor's Heart (救命宣言)
- Stage Door Johnny (舞台姊妹)
- Shanghai Shanghai (亂世兒女)
- Saga of the Phoenix (阿修羅)
- Do Unto the Others (嶽鳳之再戰江湖)
- On Parole (嶽鳳之還我清白)

== 1991 ==
- Teenage Mutant Ninja Turtles II: The Secret of the Ooze (English production)
- Fatal Vacation (安樂戰場)
- Her Fatal Ways (表姐你好)
- Brief Encounter In Shinjuku (錯在新宿)
- Angry Ranger (火爆浪子)
- To Spy with Love (小心間碟)
- Till Death Shall We Start (衰鬼撬牆腳)
- Hand in Hand (黃師父走天涯)
- The 1000 Years Cat (老貓)
- Farewell China (愛在別鄉的季節)
- The Masters (龍行天下)
- Rebel from China (勇闖天下尸)
- Mortuary Blues (屍家重地)
- The Lost Souls (富貴開心鬼)
- Till We Meet Again (何日君再來)
- The Yesman (跟屁蟲)
- Sex and Zen (玉蒲團)
- Police Story III (警察故事III)
- To Be Number One (跛豪)

== 1992 ==
- Lover-At-Large (難得有情郎)
- Finale In Blood (大鬧廣昌隆)
- Riki-Oh: The Story of Ricky (力王)
- Point of No Return (一觸即發)
- Kawashima Yoshiko (川島芳子)
- Queen's Bench III (古惑大律師)
- Bury Me High (霸王卸甲)
- Palette (Operation Scorpio) (漫畫神拳)
- Armour of God II: Operation Condor (飛鷹計劃)
- Erotic Ghost Story (聊齋艷譚)
- Underground Express (地下通道)
- Doctor Vampire (殭屍醫生)
- The Monster Wore Jeans aka The Blue Jean Monster (著牛仔褲的鍾馗)
- Story of Kennedy Town (西環的故事)
- Pretty Ghost (我老婆唔係人)
- Coup de Grace (起尾注)
- The Inspector Wears Skirts IV (92霸王花與霸王花)
- Death Wish 2 (死亡愿望2)

== 1993 ==
- Teenage Mutant Ninja Turtles III (English production)
- Freedom Run (太子爺出差)
- Changing Partner (夜夜伴肥嬌)
- Sunshine Friends (笑聲撞地球)
- Manhattan Sunrise (買起曼克頓)
- City Hunter (城市獵人)
- A Charmed Live (一世好命)
- Erotic Ghost Story II (聊齋艷譚續集)
- Once Upon a Time in China (黃飛鴻)
- Once Upon a Time in China II (黃飛鴻II)
- When Fortune Smiles (無敵幸運星)
- Invincible (戰龍在野)
- Her Fatal Ways II (表姐你好II)
- Robotrix (女機械人)
- Inspector Pink Dragon (神探馬如龍)
- The Top Bet (賭霸)
- The Shootout (槍戰(危險情人)

== 1994 ==
- Zodiac Hunters (極度追蹤)
- Twin Dragons (雙龍會)
- Erotic Ghost Story III (燈草和尚)
- Fruit Punch (YES一族)
- Center Stage (阮玲玉)
- Her Fatal Ways III (表姐你好III)
- Fist of Legend (精武英雄)
- 1 or 2 Things in Late Spring (晚春情事)
- Crazy Safari (非洲和尚)
- Dances with the Dragon (與龍共舞)
- Arrest the Restless (藍剛之反飛組風雲)
- Royal Tramp (廘鼎記I)
- Royal Tramp II (廘鼎記II)
- Infatuation (半段情)
- 100 Ways to Kill Your Wife (殺妻二人組)
- Ghost Snatchers (俾鬼捉)
- Love Me & My Dad (又見冤家)
- Cherry Blossom (少年郭達夫)
- Flirting Scholar (挑情)
- Born to Gamble (爛賭英雄傳)
- Cream Soda & Milk (忌廉溝鮮奶)
- The Home at HK (家在香港)
- Song of the Exile (客途秋恨)
- S.T.A.B. (GOLD) (特工隊勇襲機場)
- H-Bomb (Great Friday) (氫彈大勒索)
- Gold Hunter (老鼠街)
- Read Lips (孖寶闖八關)

== 1995 ==
- All for the Winner (賭聖)
- Queen of the Underworld (霞姐-夜生活女王)
- Truant Heroes (逃學英雄傳)
- She Starts the Fire (噴火女郎)
- Osmanthus Alley (桂花巷)
- Flag of Honor (旗正飄飄)
- The Terrorist (恐怖分子)
- The Killer Meteors (風雨雙流星)
- To Kill with Intrigue (劍花煙雨江南)
- Snake & Crane Arts of Shaolin (蛇鶴八步)
- Half a Loaf of Kung Fu (一招半式闖江湖)
- Who Holds the Golden Key (金鎖匙)
- Magnificent Bodyguards (飛渡捲雲山)
- Spiritual Kung Fu (拳精)
- Dragon Fist (龍拳)
- The Fearless Hyena (笑拳怪招)
- The Challenger (踢館)
- Boss of Shanghai (上海灘大亨)
- A Wily Match (一對活寶跑天下)
- The Loot (賊贓)
- The Rebellious Reign雍正與年羹堯
- Living and Loving (女兒心)
- The Crazy Chase (何方神聖)
- Dangerous Person (危險人物)
- Modern Detective (摩登神探)
- Energetic 21 (衝激21)
- Fearless Hyena Part II (龍騰虎躍)
- Devil Fetus (魔胎)
- The Ghost Informer (鬼線人)
- The Young Taoism Fighter (陰陽奇兵)
- Taoism Drunkard (鬼馬天師)
- Lucky Diamond (祝您好運)
- The Express (生命快車)
- Hong Kong Graffiti (女人風情話)
- Dark Night (暗夜)
- Magic Story (殭屍少爺)
- Walking Beside Me (心動)
- Split of the Spirit (厲鬼纏身)
- A Heroic Fight (勇闖江湖)
- Magic of Spell (驅魔童)
- All Night Long (夜瘋狂)
- Ghost Fever (鬼溝人)
- The Girl with Dexterous Touch (金粉神仙手)
- Little Sister in Law (小姨懷春)
- Shantung Man in Hong Kong (小山東到香港)
- The Kung Fu Kid (鐵拳小子)
- Body For Sale (賣身)
- New Fist of Fury (新精武門)
- Shaolin Wooden Men (少林木人巷)
- Mary from Beijing (夢醒時分)
- That Beast in Homicide (警察故事4之簡單任務)
- Five Lonely Quintet (五個寂寞的心)
- Sting of the Scorpion (蠍子之策反行動)
- Murder Made to Order (蠍子之滅反行動)
- Those Were the Days... (歲月風雲)
- Those Were the Days II (歲月風雲續集)
- Rapist Beckon (情債)
- City Hunter (城市獵人)
- Iron Monkey (鐵馬騮)
- Once Upon a Time in China III (黃飛鴻三之獅王爭霸)
- King of Beggars (武狀元蘇乞兒)
- Key to Fortune (私鐘真面目)
- 3 Days of a Blind Girl (盲女七十二小時)
- Super Lady Cop (超級女警察)
- Millionaire Cop (千面天王)
- Naked Killer (赤裸羔羊)
- Death Wish 3 (死亡愿望3)

== 1996 ==
- Top Banana Club (金裝香蕉俱樂部)
- Banana Club (正牌香蕉俱樂部)
- Final Option 2: Best Of The Best (飛虎雄心2之傲氣比天高)
- Young and Dangerous 3 (古惑仔3之隻手遮天)
- Blind Romance (偷偷愛你)
- Sexy and Dangerous (古惑女之決戰江湖)
- Sex and Zen II (玉蒲團二之玉女心經)
- Ebola Syndrome (伊波拉病毒)
- The Blade (刀)
- Police Story 4: First Strike (警察故事4之簡單任務)
- Hu Du Men (虎度門)
- The Imp (孽慾追擊檔案之邪殺)
- Big Bullet (衝鋒隊怒火街頭)
- Evening Liaison (人約黃昏)
- The Story of Ah Kam (阿金)
- Lost and Found (天涯海角)
- Comrades: Almost a Love Story (甜蜜蜜)
- Viva Erotica (色情男女)
- God of Gamblers 3: The Early Stage (賭神3之少年賭神)
- Feel 100% (百分百?Feel)
- He's a Woman, She's a Man 2 (金枝玉葉2)

== 1997 ==
- A Queer Story (基佬40)
- 2am (夜半2點鐘)
- Mr. Nice Guy (一個好人)
- The Peeping Tom (赤足驚魂)
- Young and Dangerous 4 (97古惑仔戰無不勝)
- The Wedding Days (完全結婚手冊)
- Yesteryou, Yesterme 3 (記得…香蕉成熟時III為妳鐘情)
- Downtown Torpedoes (神偷諜影)
- Stand Behind the Yellow Line (生日多戀事)
- The Soong Sisters (宋家皇朝)
- Working for Missu (給太太打工)
- Intimates (自梳)
- Too Many Ways to Be No. 1 (一個字頭的誕生)
- Love Is Not a Game, But a Joke (飛一般愛情小說)
- Kitchen (我愛廚房)
- We're No Bad Guys (愛上百分百英雄)
- Task Force (熱血最強)
- The Mad Phoenix (南海十三郎)
- Death Wish 4: The Crackdown (死亡愿望4：镇压)

== 1998 ==
- Who Am I? (我是誰)
- Anna Magdalena (安娜瑪德蓮娜)
- Portland Street Blues (古惑仔情義篇之洪興十三妹)
- Young and Dangerous 5 (98古惑仔龍爭虎鬥)
- Young and Dangerous: The Prequel (新古惑仔之少年激鬥篇)
- The Stormriders (風雲雄霸天下)
- Project B (B計劃)
- Enter the Eagles (渾身是膽)
- City of Glass (玻璃之城)
- The Lord of Hangzhou (杭州王爺)
- Hot War (幻影特攻)
- Till Death Do Us Part (我愛你)
- Hold You Tight (愈快樂愈墮落)

== 1999 ==
- A Man Called Hero (中華英雄)
- Fly Me to Polaris (星願)
- Gorgeous (玻璃樽)
- Sunshine Cops (陽光警察)
- Rave Fever (周末狂熱)

== 2000 ==
- Tokyo Raiders (東京攻略)
- I Q Dudettes (辣椒教室)
- Dial D for Demon (炭燒凶咒)
- When I Fall in Love... with Both (月亮的秘密)
- 12 Nights (12夜)
- And I Hate You So (小親親)
- Born to Be King (勝者為王)
- Summer Holidays (夏日的麼麼茶)
- Home Sweet Home (千年等一天)
- Double Tap (鎗王)
- Marooned (藍煙火)
- Skyline Cruisers (神偷次世代)
- Lavender (薰衣草)

== 2001 ==
- The Accidental Spy (特務迷城)
- Sharp Guns (險角)
- Goodbye Mr. Cool (九龍冰室)
- Love Insurance (愛情保險)
- Para Para Sakura (芭啦芭啦櫻之花)
- Extreme Challenge (地上最強)
- Stolen Love (別戀)
- You Shoot, I Shoot (買兇拍人)
- 2002 (異靈靈異)

== 2002 ==
- Marry a Rich Man (嫁個有錢人)
- Gu A Gu (股啊股)
- Interactive Murder (互動殺人事件)
- Loving Him (停不了的愛)

== 2003 ==
- My Lucky Star (行運超人)

== 2010 ==
- You Deserve to Be Single (活该你单身)
- The Child's Eye (童眼)

== 2013 ==
- No Man's Land (無人區)
- A Chilling Cosplay

== 2014 ==
- The Deathday Party (死亡派對)

== 2015 ==
- Fly Me To Venus (星語心願之再愛)
