= Alan Chui Chung-San =

Hong Kong actor (1952–2022)

- Born: Shu Zhong Xin 徐忠信; 16 August 1952; Hong Kong
- Died: 2 November 2022 (aged 70); Hong Kong
- Other names: Alan Hsu; John Chui; Hsu Chung Sin; Tsui Chung San; Chui Jong-Shinn
- Occupations: Actor; Stuntman; Stunt coordinator Film director
- Years active: 1960–2022

Chui Chung-San (often known as Shu Zhong Xin, Tsui Chung-San, Hsu Zhong-Xin or Alan Hsu; 16 August 1952 – 2 November 2022) was a Hong Kong actor, director, choreographer, martial artist and stuntman. He was known for being an action director and stuntman, both for well known film companies such as Shaw Brothers and Golden Harvest, as well as many independent film projects from Hong Kong and Taiwan.

Chui directed several wireless television series. He was critically acclaimed for choreographing and co-directing Ching Siu-tung's A Chinese Ghost Story, and Witch from Nepal.

As an actor Chui was known his leading, supporting and villainous roles, for films such as 7 Grandmasters, The Rebellious Reign, Kung Fu Vs. Yoga, Two Fists Against the Law, Election 2, and Last Hero in China, as well as other various Hong Kong and Taiwanese television shows.

== Background ==
While attending school, he would often be expelled for fighting with other students. At the age of ten, he was sent to Oriental Drama School, under the instruction of amateur opera singer and performer Tang Ti, training for acrobatic, martial arts, opera, and stunt training. Soon after finishing his studies at Peking Opera, he was scouted by Shaw Brothers in 1966 and continue with his career as an actor, stuntman, and action director.

He officially made his debut as a child actor in King Hu's Come Drink with Me (1966), along with his fellow Peking Opera colleagues such as Ching Siu-tung and Cheung Wing-fat (Mars).

Throughout his career he made over 150 films including those with various stunt work and acting roles. Chui was also known for partaking in and directing Hong Kong and Taiwanese action movies.

== Early career ==
In 1970, he became a stuntman for companies such as Golden Harvest and Shaw Brothers. As well as being an on-screen stuntman, he also worked on various TVB productions such as martial arts and Chinese historical dramas. He would also often appear as an extra role in films such as Enter the Dragon, Hapkido, and When Taekwondo Strikes. Alongside Sammo Hung, Jackie Chan, Ching Siu-tung and others, Chui worked on various other roles throughout the 1970s.

Chui was also a frequent stuntman for Yuen Woo-ping and Yuen Cheung-yan in the early to mid 70s, often working for Yuen's films such as The Awaken Punch, The Gambling Syndicate, The Oily Maniac, Born Invincible, and more.

Chui also worked in various independent movie studios and as minor roles in several Shaw Brothers productions, mostly under Chor Yuen's direction and would frequently appear as a supporting actor or extra until 1978.

== Success and later career ==
Later around 1979 and 1980, Chui became known for roles both for leading and supporting roles such as 7 Grandmasters (1978), Kung Fu Vs. Yoga (1979), Daggers 8 (1980), and Two Fists Against the Law (1980), as well as being an action director for the first time in the movies such as Shaolin Ex Monk in 1978 and John Woo's Last Hurrah for Chivalry (1978). Chui would also star in Lo Wei's periodic drama film The Rebellious Reign in 1980 where the original screenplay was written for the late Bruce Lee, Chui also served as a main fight choreographer.

Throughout the early to mid 80s, Chui would also frequently be seen or working for the independenet Taiwanese productions through the late 1970s to early 1980s, such as Born Invincible (1978), Revenge of the Shaolin Master (1979), Zen Kwan Do Strikes Paris (1981), Night Orchid (1982), The Denouncement of Chu Liu Hsiang (1982), Demon Strike (1984) and others.

Chui also helped his long-time Peking Opera colleague Ching Siu-tung with the choreography for two films from 1986 to 1987. He first collaborated with Tung to choreograph Witch from Nepal starring Chow Yun-fat and Emily Chu. Along with the collaborations with Tung, Philip Kwok, and Lau Chi Ho, he shared an award for the best action choreography. Chui's second collaboration with Tung came with a bigger success with A Chinese Ghost Story in 1987, mainly supervising the wiring action sequence and the stunt double for Leslie Cheung. Along with the previous action choreographer crew members (Tung, Kwok, Ho, and Bobby Wu), he was nominated for the best choreographer of 1987. Alan would later help Wilson Yip with the choreography for the same wiring stunt sequence technique on the 2011 remake of A Chinese Ghost Story.

Chui also got recognition as an actor in TVB shows and Television made only films in Hong Kong, shows such as The Justice of Life (1989), where he would appear as Australian gangster "Gibson", co-starring with actors such as Stephen Chow and Ng Man-tat. He would collaborate with Johnnie To for the first time in the TVB movie starring Sean Lau in Story of Nam (1989), where Chui appears as the main villain, Kuen, the role in which he got a critical praise for. In addition, he was known for his collaboration with famed Hong Kong director Wong Jing, who would collaborate with Chui in various films, notably in Jet Li starring and producing vehicle film in Last Hero in China as a villain role of Lui Yat Siu, which is one of his notable roles in Hong Kong cinema to date. Subsequently, Chui also served as a choreographer for renowned Hong Kong director King Hu's last film Painted Skin.

Throughout 2005 and 2011, Chui would reunite with the director Johnnie To (Who also previously worked in two films starring Tony Leung, The Royal Scoundrel (1991) and Tomorrow (1995)) and would work on some of the critically acclaimed films such as Breaking News, Election 2 and Life Without Principle. After the release of Life Without Principle in 2011, he took a break from film roles and began focusing on television series and wired stunts.

Chui worked on various Hong Kong movies and television shows in the years leading to his death. He played the villain role in the 2017 Hong Kong drama series Line Walker: The Prelude. He also served as a vice president of Hong Kong Stuntman Association run by Chin Ka-lok, until he died in 2022. His latest film appearance was a documentary film Kung Fu Stuntmen: Never Say No (2020), where he appeared as a guest and jury member of the stunt performance alongside Yuen Cheung-yan and Stephen Tung.

His final film appearance would be a gangster triad film The Unwavering Brotherhood co-starring alongside with Bosco Wong and Louis Cheung. The film was released posthumously in 2024, 2 years after Chui's death. The film was dedicated for Chui.

== Career as a Director ==
Chui had a very short lived directing career. He would direct his own Hong Kong and Philippines co-production low-budget action movies such as Tough Beauty and the Sloppy Slop (1995) starring Yuen Biao and Cynthia Khan, which saw a moderate success in Hong Kong. Following his first film, he would also direct Bloody Secret (2000) starring Anthony Wong and Ray Lui, which failed both critically and commercially in Hong Kong.

He also served as both second unit director and an assistant director, for films such as Incredible Kung Fu Mission (1979) starring John Liu (actor), and Hero - Beyond the Boundary of Time (1993) starring Tony Leung Chiu-wai.

== Personal life and death ==
Chui was married to his Taiwanese wife. He died on 2 November 2022, at the age of 70. Chui was survived by two children: Chui Ea-Luen (son) and Chui Yik-Mei (daughter).

Chui is also fluent in Cantonese, Mandarin, and English.

== Filmography ==
=== Filmography as an actor ===
- Come Drink with Me (1966) – One of the Little Kids
- The Rescue (1971) – Extra
- Intimate Confessions of a Chinese Courtesan (1972) – Extra
- The Casino (1972) – Lishan's Thug (Extra)
- Hapkido (1972) – Hapkido Student/Black Bear Student (Extra)
- Lady Whirlwind (1972) - Thug with Knife (Extra)
- The Young Avenger (1972) – Liu's Bandit
- Trilogy of Swordsmanship (1972) – Shi's soldier fellow (Extra)
- Duel of the Dragons (1973) – Extra
- Tiger (1973) – Japanese with Sword (Extra)
- Iron Bull (1973) – Extra
- The Awaken Punch – Thug with Knife (Extra)
- Fist of Unicorn (1973) – Street troupe
- Enter the Dragon (1973) – Han's Guard (Extra)
- When Taekwondo Strikes (1973) – Japanese who gets beaten
- The Rendezvous of Warriors (1973) - Thug (Extra)
- The Rats (1973) – Pickpocket
- Chinese Hercules (1973) – Lee's Island Thug (Extra)
- Little Tiger of Canton (1973) – Ship Fighter (Extra)
- Angry Tiger (1973)
- Ambush (1973) – Extra
- The Tournament (1974) – Japanese student
- Superior Youngster (1974) – Thug
- Naughty! Naughty! (1974) – Boss Feng's Thug
- The Man with the Golden Gun (1974)
- Virgins of the Seven Seas (1974) - Servant/Pirate (Extra)
- The Young Dragons (1974) – The Bridge Fighter (Extra)
- Gambling Syndicate (1975) – Casino Thug
- The Super Inframan (1975) – Long Haired Red Monster/Science Research Staff
- Cleopatra Jones and the Casino of Gold (1975) – Thug
- The Golden Lion (1975) – Swordsman
- Flatfoot in Hong Kong (1975) - Casino Police Informer
- Killer Clans (1976) – Chuan's Man
- The Web of Death (1976) – One of 3 Heroes of West Moon
- The Magic Blade (1976) – Assassin Bum
- Bruce Lee and I (1976) – Thug harassing Betty at the Bar
- You Are Wonderful (1976) – Killer with Knife
- Oily Maniac (1976) – Extra
- The Girlie Bar (1976) – Extra
- Bruce Lee: The Man, The Myth (1976) – Bruce Lee's Student
- Brotherhood (1976) – Hsing's Gangster
- Wrong Side of the Track (1976) – Rascal
- Judgement of an Assassin (1977) - Extra
- To Kill a Jaguar (1977) – Extra
- Soul Brothers of Kung Fu (1977) – Piao's Thug
- The Sentimental Swordsman (1977) – Black Snake
- The Adventures of Emperor Chien Lung (1977) – Soldier
- Death Duel (1977) – Yen's challenger at the woods (Cameo)
- The Instant Kung Fu Man (1977) – Mok Sai
- Broken Oath (1977) – One of Qi's men
- The Fatal Flying Guillotines (1977) – Hero with 3 section staff
- Mantis Fists and Tiger Claws of Shaolin (1977) – Thug
- Pursuit of Vengeance (1977) – Devil's Sword/Imposter/Assassin
- The Supernatural (1978)
- Snake in the Eagle's Shadow, Part II (1978) – Tan Kwan Yung
- Shaolin Ex Monk (1978) – Chih Kung
- 7 Grandmasters (1978) – Ku Yi Fung
- Born Invincible (1978) – Pa Chu (Senior)
- The Proud Youth (1978) – Four Friends from Plum Garden
- Clan of Amazons (1978) – Chongwei's Soldier
- Flying Guillotine, Part II (1978) – Soldier Killed by Flying Guillotine
- Swordsman and Enchantress (1978) – Black Inn's Thug
- Soul of the Sword (1978) – Pai Kwa Hall's Swordsman
- Legend of the Bat (1978) – Gentleman Sword
- The 36th Chamber of Shaolin (1978) – Soldier
- Dragon of the Swordsman (1978) – Assassin with flying Guillotine
- Dirty Tiger, Crazy Frog (1978) – Gets pickpocketed at Casino
- Revenge of the Pink Panther (1978) – Extra
- Golgo 13: Assignment Kowloon (1978) – Poisonous Snake
- Incredible Kung Fu Mission (1979) – Lo Tung
- A Massacre Survivor (1979) – Ling's Blade fighter
- Revenge of the Shaolin Master (1979) – Chiu Chun's Thug
- Last Hurrah for Chivalry (1979) – Oriental Fighter
- The Challenger (1979) – The Spear Fighter
- Demon Strike (1979) - Fan Kuei
- Kung Fu Vs. Yoga (1979) – Wu Shing
- Two Fists Against the Law (1980) – Fang Er
- Devil Killer (1980) – Liu Da Long
- War of the Shaolin Temple (1980) - Mongol Prince
- Shaolin Temple Against Lama (1980) – Cha Hsiu
- The Rebellious Reign (1980) – Pak Tai Hau
- The Loot (1980) – Thief Black Wolf
- Daggers 8 (1980) – Wang Chen Pang (The Second Teacher)
- Black Eagle's Blades (1981)
- Zen Kwun Do Strikes in Paris (1981) – Ken Shiu (Liu's Friend)
- Kung Fu from Beyond the Grave (1982) – Fang Zheng
- Night Orchid (1982)
- Miraculous Sword Art (1982)
- Swordsman Adventure (1983)
- Angry Young Man (1983) – Liu Ping
- The Denouncement of Chu Liu Hsiang (1983)- White Haired Spear King
- Shaolin Vs. Ninja (1983)
- Lost Virginity (1984)
- Five Fighters from Shaolin (1984) – Kum Dat Jin
- The Innocent Interloper (1986) – Opera Performer (Cameo)
- The Good Buddies (1987) – Japanese Fighter
- Swordsman & The Golden Child (1989) - String Fighter (Cameo)
- Story of Nam (1989)(TV Movie)
- The Killer's Blues (1989) – Suet's Father Killed by Ming
- Manchester Death Warrant (1990)
- The Fun, the Luck & the Tycoon (1990) – Robber (Cameo)
- The Killer (1990) – title char (Cameo)
- The Story of My Son (1990) – Policeman with debt
- The Monks from Shaolin (1991)
- The Fatal Game (1991) – Hu Xiongdi
- The Fatal Mission (1991)
- Live and Die in Hong Kong - Cameo (1991)
- Royal Scoundrel (1991) – Lo To Keung
- Running on Empty (1991)
- The Queen of Gamble (1991) – Kitaro
- The Lady Assassin (1991) (TV Movie) - Prince
- The Little Shaolin Monk (1992)
- Direct Line (1992) – Lai Jun Tao
- Girls Without Tomorrow 1992 (1992) – Brother Er
- Powerful Four (1992) – Suspect in Teahouse
- Angel Terminators (1992) - Brother Wai
- Bogus Cops (1993) – Man bragging at bar
- The Secret File (1993)(Direct to Video)
- The Wild Girls (1993)
- Last Hero in China (1993) – Lui Yat Siu
- Beyond the Copline (1993)
- S. D. U. Mission in Mission (1994) – Mao Ying
- Tomorrow (1995) (TV Movie)
- Fatal Assignment (1995)
- Drugs Fighters (1995) – Main villain
- Tough Beauty and the Sloppy Slop (1995) – Peter Wu
- Scarred Memory (1996) – Hu Shing
- Street of Fury (1996) – Kwong Yan Fai
- Haunted Karaoke (1997) – Francis Chui
- Return of Dragon (1998) – Japanese boss
- Gold Rush (1999) (Direct to Video) – Tsui Bill
- No Sweat (2000) (Direct to Video)
- Prostitute Killers (2000) – Brother Shark
- Man Wanted 3 (2000) – Brother Wind
- Breaking News (2004) – Chun's Target
- Election 2 (2006) – Uncle Tank
- Hong Kong Bronx (2008) – Uncle Man
- I Corrupt All Cops (2009) – Limp
- Turning Point (2009) – Master Da
- Vengeance (2009) – George Fung's Bodyguard
- Adventure of the King (2010) – Beggar Fighting Emperor Zhu in a Challenge
- A Chinese Ghost Story (2011) – Prisoner
- Life Without Principle (2011) – Sung's thug
- Punished (2011) – Yao's ex-triad boss
- Once Upon a Time in Macau - The Way of the Tiger (2016)
- My Alien Girlfriend (2017)- Luo Bo Tu
- Kungfu Stuntmen (2020) - Himself
- Quan Dao: The Journey of a Boxer (2020)
- New Kung Fu Cult Master 1 (2022) - Unfinished Cameo Scene (Deleted)
- Endless Battle (2023) - Lee Chien Long (Posthumous Release)
- The Brotherhood of Rebel (2023) - Tai On (Posthumous Release)
- The Unwavering Brotherhood (2024) - Tai On (Posthumous Release)

=== Filmography as action director and assistant action director ===
- The Instant Kung Fu Man (1977) – assistant action director (uncredited)
- Shaolin Ex Monk (1978) - Co-choreographer with Blackie Ko
- Ways of Kung Fu (1978) - Co-choreographer with Wynn Lau & Lee Chiu
- Last Hurrah for Chivalry (1979) - assistant action director (also a stunt double)
- Kung Fu Vs. Yoga (1979) - Co-choreographer with Mang Hoi (uncredited)
- The Incredible Kung Fu Mission (1979) – Assistant Director/Co-choreographer with Robert Tai (uncredited)
- The Rebellious Reign (1980)
- Shaolin Temple Against Lama (1980)
- War of the Shaolin Temple (1980) - Co-choreographer with Fung Hak-on, Mark Long & Lau Fong Sai
- Two Fists Against the Law (1980) - Co-choreographer with Chung Fat (uncredited)
- Zen Kwan Do Strikes Paris (1981) – Co-choreographer with John Liu
- Shaolin Temple Strikes Back (1981) - Co-choreographer with Chen Mu Chuen, Max Lee, & Lau Fong Sai
- Black Eagle's Blade (1981) - Co-choreographer with Addy Sung
- Miraculous Sword Art (1982)
- Kung Fu from Beyond the Grave (1982) - Co-choreographer with Addy Sung
- Crazy Horse, Intelligent Monkey (1982) - Co-choreographer with Chin Yuet Sang
- Night Orchid (1982) - Co-choreographer with Fung Hak-on
- Shaolin Vs. Ninja (1983)
- Demon Strike (1984)
- Witch from Nepal (1986) - Co-choreographer with Ching Siu-tung, Philip Kwok, & Lau Chi Ho
- A Chinese Ghost Story (1987) - Co-choreographer with Ching Siu-tung, Philip Kwok, Lau Chi Ho, & Bobby Wu
- Genghis Khan (1987) - (TV Series)
- Midnight Angel (1990)
- Fatal Mission (1991)
- The Killer (1991)
- Direct Line (1992)
- The Inspector Wears Skirts IV (1992)
- Painted Skin (1992)
- Super Lady Cop (1992)
- The Thief of Time (1992)
- The Wild Girls (1993)
- Magic Sword (1993)
- Hero – Beyond the Boundary of Time (1993) - Assistant Director/Co-Choreographer with Blackie Ko
- Fatal Seduction (1993)
- The Trail (1993)
- Tough Beauty and the Sloppy Slop (1995) - Co-Director with Yuen Bun
- Drug Fighters (1995)
- Street of Fury (1996)
- Haunted Karaoke (1997)
- Leopard Hunting (1998)
- White Storm (2000)
- Man Wanted 3 (2000)
- Empress, Emperor Down Jiangnan (2003) - (TV Series)
- Boxing Hero (2003)
- Internet Disaster (2003)
- The Tearful Sword (2007) - (TV Series)
- Unbeatable (2011) - (TV Series)
- A Chinese Ghost Story (2011 film) (2011)
- Nightmare (2011)
- Imminent Crisis (2012) - (TV Series)
- Waiting for Bloom (2013) - (TV Series)

=== Filmography as director ===
- The Incredible Kung Fu Mission (1979) – (assistant director)
- Hero – Beyond the Boundary of Time (1993) - (assistant director)(uncredited)
- Tough Beauty and the Sloppy Slop (1995) - (co-director with Yuen Bun)
- Bloody Secret (2000)

== Television series ==
=== Drama ===
- The Legend of the Condor Heroes (1983)
- Invincible Swordsman (1984)
- Genghis Khan (1987)
- Zheng Cheng Gong (1987)
- Wing Chun (1988)
- The Witness of Time (1988)
- The Formidable Lady from Shaolin (1988) - Sifu
- The Justice of Life (1988) - Gibson Hu Li (Australian Gangster)
- The Hunter's Prey (1990)
- The Witness of Time (1990)
- On the Edge (1991)
- The Commandments (1992)
- Gik Dok Hung Leng (1992)
- The Intangible Truth (1994)
- The Criminal Investigator II (1996)
- Once Upon a Time in Shanghai (1996)
- Weapons of Power (1997)
- War and Remembrance (1998)
- A Smiling Ghost Story (1998)
- Highs and Lows (2012)
- Silver Spoon, Sterling Shackles (2012)
- Friendly Fire (2012)
- Highs and Lows (2012)
- Always and Ever (2013)
- Brother's Keeper (2013)
- ICAC Investigators 2014 (2014)
- Young Charioteers (2015)
- Youth Huo Yuan-jia (2015)
- K9 Cop (2016)
- Come Home Love: Dinner at 8 (2016)
- Recipes to Live By (2017)
- Burning Hands (2017)
- Line Walker: The Prelude (2017)
- Heart and Greed (2017)

=== Variety shows ===
- The Green Room (2013)
- Hong Kong People Say (2015)
- Sunday Stage Fight (2016)

== Awards and nomination ==
- 6th Hong Kong Film Awards (1986) - Best Action Choreography (Won)
- 7th Hong Kong Film Awards (1987) - Best Action Choreography (Nominated)
- Hong Kong Action Stunt Performers Guild (2023) - Outstanding Action Performance Award (Won, Posthumous Award)
