= Hello, Late Homecomers =

1978 Hong Kong film by Lau Tin-chi, Louis Sit and John Woo

- 哈囉夜歸人
- Directed by: Lau Tin-chi; Louis Sit; John Woo
- Written by: Lau Tin-chi; Louis Sit; John Woo
- Produced by: Raymond Chow
- Starring: Louis Lo; Yik Ka; Angel Chan
- Cinematography: Cheung Yiu-Cho; Jimmy Yu Chun
- Edited by: Peter Cheung
- Music by: Frankie Chan
- Production company: Golden Harvest Productions
- Release date: 16 November 1978 (Hong Kong)
- Running time: 106 minutes
- Country: Hong Kong
- Language: Cantonese

Hello, Late Homecomers (Chinese: 哈囉夜歸人; Jyutping: haa1 lo1 je6 gwai1 jan4), also known as Moonlighters or Hello! 夜歸人, is a 1978 Cantonese-language Hong Kong anthology comedy film with segments directed by Lau Tin-chi, Louis Sit and John Woo.

== Plot ==
=== "Till We Meet Again" ===
Lou (Louis Lo) bets his friend (Karl Maka) HK$10,000 that he can bed any woman within 24 hours. Lou selects an attractive girl and experiences a series of failures and setbacks trying to woo her. He confesses the bet and makes a deal to give her HK$5,000 if she goes to a hotel with him to make it seem like they have slept together. After winning the bet, he learns that she is actually a prostitute who sleeps with men for HK$250.

=== "Heart on Her Undies" ===
Villager Ya Fa (Louis Lo) gifts Ya Ka a goose. She gifts him a pair of underwear with a red heart on the back and insists that he wear it to his meetings with her. Ya Fa changes clothes to a modern outfit and becomes Alan. A different girl Alan is wooing is an artist who uses his underwear as part of one of her paintings. Alan uses her materials to create a fresh pair of underwear with a red heart on them. The police arrest him under the suspicion of being part of a ring of men smuggling heroin in similarly styled pairs of underwear.

=== "Little Men's Big Hopes" ===
Manager Lo Ya Fa (Louis Lo) wants to eliminate his demanding wife in order to marry his secretary Ms. Chan. Ms. Chan gives him the business card of Mr. Bingo, who teaches Mr. Lo how to set up a series of traps in his house to kill his wife, but she resists and the traps end up being triggered and harming Mr. Lo, Mr. Bingo and Ms. Chan instead.

== Cast ==
- Louis Lo as Lou (in "Till We Meet Again")/Ya Fa a.k.a. Alan (in "Heart on Her Undies")/Lo Ya Fa (in "Little Men's Big Hopes")
- Yik Ka
- Angel Chan
- Liu Suk-Yee
- Fung Hak-On
- Lee Hoi-Sang
- Cheng Lei
- Cheng Fu-Hung
- Resand Lam
- Karl Maka
- Lau Hok-Nin
- Tong Kam-Tong
- Fung Fung
- Ho Pak-Kwong
- Lau Kwok-Shing
- Ma Chung-Tak
- Lee Wan-Lung
- Melvin Wong
- Chan Pak-San
- Chi Sau-Fung

== Production ==
The film was shot in Hong Kong.

When asked about the film in an interview with Robert K. Elder contained in the book John Woo: Interviews, John Woo recalled, "Oh yeah, I was a co-director with other guys. There was this kind of a popular midnight talk show; it was all about sex. It was still pretty conservative but for that time it was a pretty popular--they did some sex jokes. They wanted to make a movie [version] and went to the studio to make a film. Then [the studio] hired two directors, one was the original writer. It was pretty big job for them. Also, it was their first time and they wanted to co-direct with me. So, I just did one part. Each director directed one-third of the movie." When asked about his segment in particular, John Woo stated, "I hardly remember ... it's a story about somebody who wanted to kill his wife. He set up a lot of traps--the door would connect with a wire and bomb, and when she opened the door, it would blow up. He put poison in her drink.... Somehow the wife finds out in a letter to her husband and she makes him stay in the room and makes him do all the things [spring all the devices]. [...] Pretty funny, and it had a little sex. At that time, it was pretty subtle--just a sexy moment. But after I made my story, the other two didn't know how to direct it and they asked me to finish their work for them. So that's why they used my name, they only used my name. I didn't have a problem with it; it was fun."

== Release ==
The film was released in Hong Kong on 16 November 1978, just two months after the similarly titled but unrelated Shaw Brothers omnibus film Hello Sexy Late Homecomers (哈囉床上夜歸人). It was given a IIB rating.

The US VHS release was titled Hello! Late Homecomers.

== Reception ==
Reviewer Kenneth Brorsson of sogoodreviews.com wrote, "A trilogy of short stories, containing farce-takes on love and sex, all starring a mostly unbearable Lo Yuen. In "Till We Meet Again", he's a playboy who makes a bet with his friends (one played by Karl Maka) that he will score with a particular beauty within 24 hours. The poor man's Michael Hui in the form of lead Lo goes to work by assaulting and trying to drug the victim of his bet. Some bad taste rears its head indeed and not an ounce of humour, much of which can be applied to the second 30-minute skit "Heart On Her Undies" as well. Here Lo is a race horse broadcaster with women lining up to bed him and his heart-undies. One scene sees Lo basically raping one of the women as someone off-screen is instead describing how to deal with a pig. This bad taste coupled with penis jokes and a Benny Hill emulated score, doesn't fly. Reportedly John Woo handled the last segment called "Little Men's Big Hopes" and here things start to finally get good and bearable. Lo Yuen plays a husband under strict control of his wife and he decides to hire an assassin to kill her. Lo chooses to set the traps himself and of course this backfires. Many surreal tangents and Lee Hoi-Sang as the deranged, very braindead assassin gets this often black and exaggerated short deserved laughs. Lo Yuen is now a bearable poor man's Hui and echoes of what was to come in Woo's filmography can be picked up upon if you will. Such as guns being hidden in pots and the general dark tone to the comedy that become a huge tangent of From Riches To Rags."

In his essay "Mischievous Urban Fantasia: Michael Hui's Comic Mode" contained in the book Golden Harvest: Leading Change in Changing Times, essayist Ernest Chan wrote, "John Woo has walked a different path in his exploration of comedy. The fundamental difference is that while he does not measure up to Hui in jokes and rhythm, he is more skilful with visual gags." Chan remarks that "the intricate installation whose purpose is to murder the wife in Hello Late Homecomers (1978) is more than likely John Woo’s brainchild. In contrast to Michael Hui, Woo tends to exaggerate in his shots, giving them a cartoonist treatment."
