= Last Hurrah for Chivalry =

1979 Hong Kong wuxia film by John Woo

- Theatrical poster
- 豪俠
- Directed by: John Woo
- Written by: John Woo
- Produced by: Raymond Chow
- Starring: Damian Lau; Wei Pai; Bonnie Ngai; Lau Kong; Lee Hoi-sang
- Cinematography: Cheung Yiu-cho; Yu Chun
- Edited by: Peter Cheung
- Music by: Frankie Chan
- Production company: Golden Harvest
- Distributed by: Golden Harvest
- Release date: 22 November 1979 (HK)
- Running time: 107 minutes
- Country: Hong Kong
- Language: Cantonese

Last Hurrah for Chivalry (豪俠) is a 1979 Hong Kong wuxia film written and directed by John Woo and produced by Raymond Chow. It starred Damian Lau, Wei Pai, Bonnie Ngai, Lau Kong, and Lee Hoi-sang. The film is cited as a thematic precursor to Woo's better-known heroic bloodshed films. It was released theatrically in Hong Kong by Golden Harvest on 11 November 1979.

== Synopsis ==
Kao Pang, the son and heir of a great deceased warrior, prepares for his wedding at his opulent hillside estate. Kao admits to his men that his bride is a prostitute that he bought; the men note that Kao has focused on scholarship instead of martial virtue, and suggest that his scholarship has focused on skill in the bedroom. The wedding is interrupted by an attack by Pak Chung-tong, the enemy of Kao's father. He and his men have come to reclaim the estate that Kao's father took from him in battle. In the middle of the melee, the bride turns on Kao, and reveals that Pak paid her to betray Kao. As a result, the battle goes poorly and Kao is forced to flee with his last remaining servant, leaving control of the estate to Pak.

Kao swears revenge, but his servant convinces him he will need help. Kao first asks a grandmaster for a magic sword to aid in his revenge, but the grandmaster denies the request, saying Kao's character is lacking. Next Kao seeks for a warrior who he can hire to defeat Pak for him, and finds Chang San, who has mostly given up combat to care for his sister and their ailing mother. Kao charms Chang into helping him, by buying expensive medicines for his mother, and later by paying her funeral expenses.

Chang climbs the wall of a courtyard to enjoy the music performed by the courtesan Sau-sau. There he meets Tsing-yi, a drunken wandering mercenary, who is in a one-sided relationship with the courtesan. The two join forces and develop a bond of brotherhood. They scout the estate of Pak to identify his most dangerous henchmen, and then launch their attack, defeating the henchmen in turn and finally defeating Pak. After their victory, Tsing-yi puts his sword to Chang's throat and says that Kao had offered to pay him to kill Chang. Later, Kao's servant sees Chang's lifeless body.

Kao ransacks the grandmaster's home for the magic sword and finds it hidden behind a mirror. He kills the grandmaster, then lies to his servant that the grandmaster's death was suicide. The servant confronts Kao for his poor character, and Kao kills him as well.

Tsing-yi comes to collect the price from Kao, and Kao gives him a bag. Tsing suspects a trap, and discards the bag, which is filled with venomous snakes. Chang emerges from hiding, and the three of them fight. The magic sword allows Kao to fly into the sky and disappear, and then unleash a devastating falling attack. The third time Kao tries this attack, Tsing-yi pushes Chang aside and lifts his sword to the sky. Kao and Tsing-yi simultaneously impale each other, leaving Chang the only survivor.

== Cast ==
- Damian Lau as Tsing-yi
- Wei Pai as Chang San
- Lau Kong as Kao Pang
- Lee Hoi-sang as Pak Chung-tong
- Bonnie Ngai as Sau-sau
- Fung Hak-on as 'Pray'
- Chin Yuet-sang as the Sleeping Wizard
- Cheng Lui as Chen Guan-wu
- Wang Kuang-yu as Wang
- Wen Hsiu as Chang's mother
- Chang Ching-po as a bandit
- Alan Chui as a bodyguard
- Hsu Hsia as a wedding guest
- Mars, Tai San and Huang Ha as Pak's men

== Production ==
John Woo intended the film as a tribute to his mentor Chang Cheh and director Akira Kurosawa, whom he admired greatly. The latter includes the use of transitional wipes (a signature of Kurosawa's films) and slow motion action sequences (which would become one of Woo's signatures). The main character Tsing Yi is inspired by the historical assassin Jing Ke, who is known for his failed assassination attempt of Qin Shi Huang. The year the film was released was also the same year Woo met Tsui Hark.

The film was the first project that Wei Pai, a veteran Shaw Brothers Studio actor, did with Golden Harvest since he left the Shaw Brothers Studio.

In addition, actor Fung Hak-on, who frequently collaborated with Woo in the 1970s, served as a stunt coordinator along with Alan Chui for the action choreography and stunt doubling for Damian Lau and Wei Pai. Both choreographers also previously starred in Woo's feature-length debut film, The Young Dragons in 1974.

== Release ==
=== Box office ===
Last Hurrah for Chivalry had mediocre box office numbers.

=== Home media ===
The film was officially released on 2K Blu-ray on March 3rd, 2023 as part of a The Criterion Collection spine number 1174, marking Woo's third film to be released by Criterion since 1998 with Woo's two other popular films such as The Killer and Hard Boiled, both of which were released in DVD and Laserdisc format in limited production run due to the rights issue at the time.
