= Plain Jane to the Rescue =

1982 Hong Kong film by John Woo

- 八彩林亞珍
- Directed by: John Woo
- Written by: John Woo; Lau Chun-Wah
- Produced by: Raymond Chow (executive producer); Josephine Siao; Louis Sit
- Starring: Josephine Siao; Ricky Hui
- Cinematography: Lau Hung-Chuen
- Edited by: Fan Kung-Wing
- Music by: Tang Siu-Lam; Avalon Music, Inc.
- Production company: Hi-Pitch Co. Ltd.
- Distributed by: Golden Harvest Productions
- Release date: 21 October 1982 (Hong Kong)
- Running time: 86 minutes
- Country: Hong Kong
- Language: Cantonese
- Box office: HK$4,606,930.

Plain Jane to the Rescue (Chinese: 八彩林亞珍; Jyutping: baat3 coi2 lam4 aa3 zan1) is a 1982 Cantonese-language Hong Kong comedy film directed by John Woo. It is the third in the series of Plain Jane films starring Josephine Siao based on the same character she played in a popular TV series.

== Plot ==
After being fired from a series of jobs, Lam Ah Chun meets her old friend Fang working at Zada Electronic Industries Ltd., a company belonging to the Zada Group. When she is fired from that job as well, she is hired by Mr Sha, the head of the Zada Group who controls 40% of Hong Kong's finances, to teach his father manners. At his father's birthday party, Mr Sha tricks him into signing his will and encourages him to blow out all the candles on a very long cake, hoping that he will die due to his bad lungs. Mr Sha's father is upset about the Zada Group tearing down houses and businesses for its own developments and threatens to revoke his will, so Mr Sha has him locked up.

Tang proposes to Lam Ah Chun in front of her parents at a restaurant by saying that he only has his heart to give and revealing an animal heart wrapped in a ribbon. Lam Ah Chun laughs as the other guests are driven away in disgust. Thugs from the Zada Group suddenly appear and announce that they are taking over the restaurant. Lam Ah Chun visits a lawyer who says that Mr Sha's father controls most of the shares of the Zada Group and can revoke his will by signing all of the pages of a particular form. Lam Ah Chun and the lawyer sneak a fax machine into Mr Sha's father's room in Zada Hospital but Mr Sha's men prevent him from signing the final page of the form and imprison him in a room in his house.

Fang gives an impassioned speech against greedy landlords at a protest against the demolitions and takeovers by the Zada Group and angrily stands up to the Zada Group's thugs when they come to stop the protest. When the police arrive to arrest Fang for holding an illegal protest, Lam Ah Chun and the others all claim to be Fang. When they are caught in a pile-up car crash in a tunnel, an arsonist named Fire pours oil in the tunnel and threatens to set fire to the tunnel. When asked for his demands, he allows the other drivers to give their demands. After the young girls present demand a concert by Roman Tam, Lam Ah Chun demands to see Mr Sha's father. Mr Sha's father escapes from his imprisonment in his house and is taken by police to the tunnel, where he signs the final page of the form to revoke his will.

== Cast ==
- Josephine Siao as Lam Ah Chun
- Ricky Hui as Tsang Fei Fang
- Roman Tam as Himself (cameo)
- Li Lin-Lin as Ms Lee (cameo)
- Chan Sing as Mr Chan (cameo)
- Wu Fung as Lawyer
- Lau Hak-Suen as Zada factory manager
- David Wu Dai-Wai as Movie director
- Kan Yee-Ching as Tang Yan Fat
- Mark Cheung Lui as Fire
- Lee Ming-Yeung as Mr Sha's father
- Yuen Ling-To as Mr Sha's assistant
- Chow Gat as Lam Ah Chun's father
- Lau Yat-Fan as Tak
- Lee Ngan as Rose
- Fung Ging-Man as Unemployed man slapping Fang
- Charlie Cho Cha-Lee as Mr Sha
- John Woo as himself (cameo)
- Alex Ng Hong-Ling as Mr Sha's assistant
- Gam Biu as Police officer (cameo)
- Ng Kwok-Kin as Policeman issuing parking ticket
- Luk Ying-Hong as Mr Sha's security staff
- Goo Wai-Jan as Lam Ah Chun's mother
- Au Shu-Cham as Squatter
- Ho Pak-Kwong as One of hostages in tunnel
- Wong Ka-Kui as Mr Sha's party guest
- Yeung Wo as Dentist
- Wong Chi-Wing as Policeman

== Production ==
The film was shot in Hong Kong.

In an interview with Robert K. Elder contained in the book John Woo: The Interviews, director John Woo recalled, "I had a wonderful feeling, so much joy working with Josephine Siao Fong-fong. She was one of the biggest teenaged stars in the 1960s. She was extremely popular and smart, intelligent, intellectual, and full of great ideas. One of the smartest actresses in Hong Kong. When we worked together, it made things so much easier because she was also the producer of the film. She worked with the writers and came up with a lot of good ideas, a lot of great jokes. Her character was very funny and popular at the time."

John Woo's wife called him to tell him that she had given birth to their son while Woo was filming a scene in which Siao's character helps to deliver a baby.

== Release ==
The film was released theatrically in Hong Kong on 21 October 1982, earning HK$4,606,930.

== Reception ==
Reviewer Kenneth Brorsson of sogoodreviews.com wrote, "John Woo's Lam Ah Chun contribution showcases what we unfortunately know of his comedy side; it ain't pretty. Siao is certainly a fine comedienne and initially has the physical delivery somewhat nailed down but it's still contained within routines that never feels possible to laugh out loud at anyway. As Woo, who also wrote, pours on his social commentary about evil corporate Hong Kong, it's painfully obvious he lacks the skills of Michael Hui to combine this with a skit structure."

In the book John Woo: The Films, author Kenneth E. Hall wrote that "aspects of Plain Jane to the Rescue fit well into that tradition of Cantonese comedy which privileges the 'little guy,' pitting him (or her) against faceless corporations, impersonal police forces or well-organized criminals." The author continues, "the fact is that Plain Jane to the Rescue is a self-contained little comedy. Often Woo's earlier work suffers from low budgets; he was frequently forced to cut corners to a nearly impossible extent. Nevertheless, he sometimes did very original work in these films, and Plain Jane to the Rescue at least occasionally bears the mark of his talent for absurdity."

In the book Planet Hong Kong: Popular Cinema and the Art of Entertainment, author David Bordwell wrote, "Plain Jane to the Rescue (1982), with its graceful tracking shots and clever cutting, has a technical finish rare in local comedy of the time."

Reviewer Andrew Saroch of fareastfilms.com gave the film a rating of 3 out of 5 stars, writing, "Episodic like a Hui Brothers film but without the sharp humour, 'Plain Jane To The Rescue' is an enjoyable diversion though it may test the patience of some fans. Packed with typical 80s wackiness and a faintly surreal tone, this is Hong Kong comedy for those of a sturdy constitution. Although John Woo tries, as he did with 'From Riches To Rags', to include a message against materialism, the finished production is too muddled to remain memorable."

The website The 14 Amazons gave the film a rating of 4 out of 5 stars, writing that the film "is closer to great than its opposite, pulling off the fine art of being cleverly stupid that somehow makes comedy tick. There is some inspired idiocy and absurdity, with Josephine Siao and Ricky Hui's willingness to look ridiculous making them a very charming couple."

Ryota Nakanishi wrote, "this slapstick comedy is not only in the tradition of Charles Chaplin (Modern Times, 1936) and Michael Hui's Cantonese slapstick comedies (The Private Eyes, 1976) of the 70s, but it is also a creative response of Hong Kong filmmakers to Vittorio De Sica's The Roof (1956) with Hong Kong characteristics."

Author Karen Fang wrote that the film "blends socially-pointed imagery of public protest with an elaborate and sustained car chase sequence around Hong Kong's famous cross-harbor tunnel."

The review on serp.media reads, "Get ready for a rip-roaring action-comedy adventure with Plain Jane to the Rescue! . Set in 1982, this hilarious third installment of the series stars the stunning Josephine Siao as the tough-as-nails teacher hired by a C. E. O."

In the book John Woo's The Killer, author Kenneth E. Hall called the film one of John Woo's "very successful comedies".

The website theshelf.com called the film one of John Woo's "beloved comedies".

The website onderhond.com gave the film a rating of 2.5 out of 5.

The website hkcinema.ru gave the film a rating of 7 out of 10.
