= The Dragon Tamers =

1975 Hong Kong film by John Woo

- Traditional Chinese: 女子跆拳群英會
- Simplified Chinese: 女子跆拳群英会
- Literal meaning: Women's Taekwondo Elite Club
- Hanyu Pinyin: Nǚzǐ Tái Quán Qún Yīng Huì
- Jyutping: Neoi2 Zi2 Toi4 Kyun4 Kwan4 Jing1 Wui2
- Directed by: John Woo
- Written by: John Woo
- Produced by: Raymond Chow
- Starring: James Tien; Carter Wong; Kim Chang-suk
- Cinematography: Li Cheng-chun
- Edited by: Peter Cheung; Chin Chang-chun
- Music by: Joseph Koo
- Distributed by: Golden Harvest Company
- Release date: 15 March 1975 (Hong Kong)
- Running time: 107 minutes
- Country: Hong Kong
- Language: Cantonese

The Dragon Tamers, also known as Belles of Taekwondo (Chinese: 女子跆拳群英會), is a 1975 Hong Kong martial arts film directed by John Woo and starring James Tien, Carter Wong and Kim Chang-suk. This is the second feature-length film to be directed by Woo, following The Young Dragons in 1974.

This action picture from Golden Harvest was filmed in South Korea. The stunt choreographer, Chuan Chen, had been a recognized talent at Golden Harvest, having worked on many of their films. His assistant on this particular production was Jackie Chan.

== Cast ==
- James Tien as Nan Kung
- Carter Wong as Fang
- Kim Chang-suk as Sheng Ming-mei
- Ji Han-jae as Master Sheng
- Yeung Wai as Yuan (younger)
- Kim Ki-ju as Yuan (elder)
- Chan Chuen as Yuan's top fighter
- Hsu Hsia as Yuan's thug
- Yuen Wah as a student beaten by Nan
- Chik Ngai-hung as Yuan's thug
- Lee Ye-min
- Martin Chui
- Jang Jeong-kuk
- Ina Ryoko
- Kobayashi Chie
- Saijo Nami
- Hara Keiko
- Park Seong-jae
- Lee Dae-yeob as Master Pai
- Woo Yeon-jeong as a woman in love with Nan Kung
- Tam Bo
- Kim Wang-kuk as a man defeated by Yuans
- Lee Joo-keun
- Ho Choi-yat
