= Follow the Star =

1978 Hong Kong film by John Woo

- Film poster
- Traditional Chinese: 大煞星與小妹頭
- Hanyu Pinyin: dà shā xīng yǔ xiǎo mèi tóu
- Jyutping: daai6 saat3 seng1 jyu4 siu2 mui6 tau4
- Directed by: John Woo
- Produced by: Raymond Chow
- Music by: Frankie Chan
- Production company: Golden Harvest
- Release date: 2 April 1978
- Country: Hong Kong
- Language: Cantonese

Follow the Star is a 1978 Hong Kong action comedy film directed by John Woo and starring Rowena Cortes.

== Plot ==
Miss Chen (Rowena Cortes) is a rich pop singer, and her father (John Woo) is a former criminal. On his last job before retiring, he keeps the crew's haul all for himself, and goes into hiding. One day while getting her car repaired by mechanic Ah Sing (Roy Chiao), Miss Chen is kidnapped by her father's former partners, who demand a ransom.

== Cast ==
- Rowena Cortes as Miss Chen
- John Woo as Miss Chen's father
- Roy Chiao as Ah Sing
