= 7 Grandmasters =

1978 Hong Kong film by Joseph Kuo

- Film poster
- Traditional Chinese: 虎豹龍蛇鷹(绝拳)
- Simplified Chinese: 虎豹龙蛇鷹(绝拳)
- Literal meaning: tiger leopard dragon snake eagle boxing
- Hanyu Pinyin: Hǔ bào lóng shé yīng (jué quán)
- Directed by: Joseph Kuo
- Written by: Yao Ching Kang; Joseph Kuo; Raymond To
- Produced by: Joseph Kuo
- Starring: Lee Yi Min; Jack Long; Alan Hsu; Corey Yuen; Mark Long; Wong Fei-lung
- Cinematography: James Wu
- Edited by: Huang Chiu-Kuei
- Music by: Chow Fook Leung
- Production company: Hong Hwa International Films (H.K.) Ltd.
- Distributed by: Mei Ah Entertainment
- Release date: March 21, 1977
- Running time: 84 minutes
- Country: Hong Kong
- Languages: Mandarin; Cantonese

7 Grandmasters is a 1977 Hong Kong kung fu film directed by Joseph Kuo, starring Lee Yi Min, Jack Long, Alan Hsu, Mark Long, Corey Yuen and Nancy Yen. It was filmed in Mandarin for the Taiwanese market, and dubbed in Cantonese for the Hong Kong market.

== Plot ==
The Story Began Since The Period Of Qing Dynasty Before The Revolutionist Far, Sang Kuan Chun is an old kung fu master who is getting ready to retire from martial arts. But just as he is about to put up the king's signboard and call it quits, he receives a note alleging that he's not the best. Thus begins his journey for one last challenge with each of the Seven Grandmasters to prove his superiority. As Sang Kuan Chun and his three students travel from one challenge to the next, the foursome acquires a fifth—a young man named Siu Ying who wants desperately to train under master Sang Kuan Chun to avenge his father's death. So he tags along, despite the master's insistence that he will not accept any more students. Eventually, we learn more about the master's past.

His own teacher, before he died, left him the secret book of The Pai Mei Twelve Strikes. However, a masked man soon stole several pages of the book, leaving only nine strikes. So, somewhere out there, is this unknown man, and he has the final three strikes of Pai Mei, which are the most deadly and can beat even the other nine strikes. Sang Kuan Chun soon accepts the seemingly devout Siu Ying and teaches him the nine known strikes of Pai Mei. Siu Ying ends up learning from his “uncle” that Sang Kuan Chun (who was set up) killed his father during a friendly tournament. Siu Ying is taught the final 3 strikes by a mysterious figure and almost kills Sang Kuan Chun until he being a loyal good student couldn't break his teacher's rule of "Never kill anyone if it can be avoided". This all leads up to an exciting climax, where we learn the identity of the masked man who stole the Pai Mei final strikes and the identity of the man who killed Siu Ying's father.

== Cast ==
- Li Yi Min as Siu Ying
- Jack Long as Sang Kuan Chun
- Mark Long as Yung Chang, Sang Kuan Chun's elder student
- Alan Hsu as Ku Yi Fung
- Corey Yuen as Sun Hung
- Chin Yuet San as Monkey Liu
- Wong Fei-lung as Sha, First Grandmaster (Guest)
- Nancy Yen as Sang's daughter
- Eagle Lee as Sang Kuan Chun's Student
- Chiu Chung Hing as Sang Kuan Chun's Student
- Ma Chin Ku as Nan Lin

== Home media ==
The film was widely released in VHS, VCD, and DVD formats, both in common English and Mandarin dubbed versions. The film's distributor, Mei Ah Entertainment later released a 4K remastered version of the film on streaming services in Asian countries such as Hong Kong, Taiwan, and South Korea, with both Mandarin and a rare Cantonese dubbed version.
