= Kung Fu vs. Yoga =

1979 Hong Kong film by Chan Chuen

- Promotional image
- 老鼠拉龜
- Directed by: Chan Chuen; Mang Hoi (Martial Arts director)
- Written by: Paul Chang Chung
- Produced by: Paul Chang Chung
- Starring: Chin Yuet Sang; Alan Chui Chung-San; Michelle Yim
- Cinematography: Liao Pen-Jung; Sun Tsai-Su
- Production company: Cheung Brothers Film Company
- Distributed by: Seasonal Film Corporation
- Release date: 21 June 1979
- Running time: 85 minutes
- Country: Hong Kong
- Language: Cantonese

Kung Fu vs. Yoga is a 1979 martial arts comedy film directed by Chan Chuen and starring Chin Yuet Sang, Alan Chui Chung-San and Michelle Yim.

== Plot ==
Tiger (played by Chin Yuet Sang) and his buddy Wu Shing (played by Alan Chui) enter a competition in which Tiger wins and Ting (played by Michelle Yim) is forced into a marriage from the competition. However, Ting tells Tiger that if he gets three treasures for her then she will accept Tiger as her love. With the help of Wu Shing, Tiger must fight the mad monk, an intense trans woman, and finally the Yoga Master to get the treasures.

== Casts ==
- Chin Yuet Sang as Tiger
- Alan Chui Chung-San as Wu Shing
- Michelle Yim as Ting
- Dupar Singh as Yoga Master (Final Challenger)
- Fung Hak-on as Insane drag at brothel (Second Challenger)
- San Kuai as Mad Monk (First Challenger)
- Austin Wai as brothel customer who gets beaten
- Chang Chung as Ting's father
- Chui Fat as Contestant Swordsman
- Tai San
- Chung Fat
- Mang Hoi
- Chik Ngai Hung

== Trivia ==
- The movie was the first starring role for both Chin Yuet Sang and Alan Chui Chung-San.
- This was the first film in which Mang Hoi choreographed the action sequences.
