= Tough Beauty and the Sloppy Slop =

1995 Hong Kong-Filipino film by Yuen Bun and Alan Chui

- Film poster
- Traditional Chinese: 怒海威龍
- Simplified Chinese: 怒海威龙
- Hanyu Pinyin: Nù Hǎi Wēi Lóng
- Jyutping: Nou6 Hoi2 Wei1 Lung4
- Directed by: Yuen Bun; Alan Chui
- Screenplay by: Fok King-yiu
- Produced by: Chung Wai-shing; David Lam
- Starring: Yuen Biao; Cynthia Khan; Waise Lee; Monsour Del Rosario
- Cinematography: Stephen Poon
- Edited by: Yiu Tin-hung
- Music by: J. Galden
- Production company: New Treasurer Films
- Distributed by: Libran Films
- Release dates: December 15, 1995 (Hong Kong); January 4, 1996 (Philippines)
- Running time: 90 minutes
- Countries: Hong Kong; Philippines
- Languages: Cantonese; English; Filipino
- Box office: HK$1,688,100

Poster for Philippine release

Tough Beauty and the Sloppy Slop is a 1995 action film directed by Yuen Bun and Alan Chui. A Hong Kong-Filipino co-production, it stars Yuen Biao, Cynthia Khan, Waise Lee and Monsour Del Rosario. It was theatrically released in the Philippines on January 4, 1996, as Mabangis Na Lungsod (lit. 'Ferocious City').

== Plot ==
In the Philippines, Officer Man (Alex Man) leads his squad to bust a drug deal and apprehends Talung, second in command of counterfeiter, Roy (Waise Lee). At night, Man's subordinate, Santos (Monsour Del Rosario) also arrests Roy's girlfriend, Yu Wing-kei (Tam Suk-mui) before Man was killed at his mother's (Lily Leung) birthday celebration by a hitman sent by Roy. Meanwhile, in Shenzhen, China, Officer Yang Lai-ching busts s drug deal where she arrests the dealer (Yuen Wah), and discovers the money used in the transaction were counterfeits and Yang was sent to a joint operation by the Hong Kong, Chinese and Filipino police police force to infiltrate drug dealers in the Philippines who use counterfeits to buy drugs in China to be trafficked in Hong Kong. Yang is assigned to close to Yu in prison while she is partnered with Hong Kong inspector Lee King-tong (Yuen Biao), who has been working undercover in the Philippines for three years.

In the Philippines, Lee visits Yang in prison and tells her that they are to act as a married couple and to hurry up in getting close to Yu. Yang successfully befriends Yu after defending the latter against a bully. At this time, Santos leads an arrest in a restaurant owned by Roy where cocaine were found but Roy's employee volunteers as a scapegoat. On Valentine's Day, Lee visits Yang with bouquet flowers with two bottles of dioxide solution for Yang and Yu to drink so he could help them escape while they are sent to the hospital. Lee then gives a call to Santos to meet with him at night, where he was attacked by hitmen sent by Roy and hold his wife and daughter hostage, but Lee arrives just in time to save them while killing the hitmen with Santos. The next day, Yang and Yu follows through with Lee's plan and Lee rescues them from the ambulance. Yu then brings Lee and Yang to Roy's mansion where one of Roy's partner recognizes Lee as a pimp who cheated him and Lee's henchmen him, but Lee and Yang fight back and Roy is impressed with their combat skills. Lee and Yang live with Yu in a villa owned by Roy which is bugged by Roy. Lee and Yang realizes this but gets into a fight but Roy's men who are eavesdropping thinks they are just having intense sex.

The next day, Roy hires Lee to rescue Talung from the court. Lee executes a plan where he poses as a bomb disposal officer and evacuates the court and then blows up the car used to bring Talung to prison and suggests his bomb disposal vehicle to be used instead knocks out guards who escorting Talung after they get on the vehicle. Impressed with Lee, Roy gives him another mission to assassinate Santos. Lee stages a shootout with Santos in a supermarket where they pretend to shoot at each other before killing several of Roy's henchmen. Unable to help Santos escape, Lee pretends to kill him by shooting his left shoulder but as he leaves, one of Lee's henchmen fires several more shots on Santos. Roy celebrates with henchmen after seeing the news that Santos has died and pays Lee a huge stack of cash but Lee is upset and throws it away while drowning his sorrows with alcohol for getting his friend killed.

Roy's boss (Billy Chow), who has been impressed with Lee, meets with him in person and plans to move him up to a big position in his gang. However, Roy is upset at this and pulls a gun on Lee, until Roy's partner, Ramos (Jerry Bailey), stops him. Roy's boss then sends him, Ramos, Lee and Yang to a deal with their client, Peter Wu (Alan Chui) at a nightclub but Lee recognizes Wu as a criminal he has arrested before in Hong Kong. When Ng recognizes Lee, he attempts to keep his cover by accusing Ng to be a cop, which Wu denies before a couple a drug patrons also claim Ng to be a cop. While Roy suspects Lee, Ramos dismisses his suspicion. Lee goes to another nightclub and surprisingly encounters Santos in the bathroom. Santos reveals to Lee that he wore a bulletproof vest the day he was seemingly killed and the drunk patrons at the other nightclub were his subordinates. Lee tells Santos that he has met Roy's boss but does not know his name while Santos also warns Lee to be careful as Roy is starting to suspect him.

Yu arrives to Roy's mansion and tells him she wants to return to Hong Kong and wants him to come along, but he slaps her and finally reveals that Lee and Yang are police officers after having overheard a conversation between them earlier. Roy's boss then orders him to Lee and Yang to his headquarters, so Roy calls his henchman to set a roadblock at Highway 16 and kill Lee and Yang while on the way to his boss's headquarters, which Yu overhears. After kicking Yu out, he calls another henchman to kill Yu. Before Lee and Yang leave to the headquarters, Yu tells them to be careful and they deduce that she might have figured their true identities. At the roadblock, the car Lee and Yang were riding were held by the police but Santos arrives, having captured the hitmen sent by Roy, and tells them Roy's schemes. Santos them hides in their car's trunk with a subordinate when the car freed and continue to the headquarters. Roy arrives at his boss's headquarters and makes up a story that Lee and Yang were killed right before they arrive. Roy's boss then show Lee and Yang around and the production of counterfeits before bringing them to a meeting with his international clients where he states the importance of honesty before having one of his muscular henchmen kill Roy by crushing his head. Roy's boss then introduces Lee to his Hong Kong client, Mr. Ng (Shum Wai), who is Peter Ng's older brother and beats Lee and Yang. Roy's boss, who is a former soldier, decides to execute Lee and Yang with martial law but Santos and his subordinates saves them by shooting then boss's henchmen and Lee and Yang pick up machine guns and join them in killing the henchmen. Lee then engages in a fight with a muscular henchmen and kills him by landing a couple of kicks to his head after a struggle. He then fights the boss and Yang also aides him after killing Mr. Ng but they are outmatched and the boss impales Lee with a sharp stick. Santos steps in to help but is outmatched by the boss as well and Lee finally kills the boss by shooting a bamboo at him using a water hose.

== Cast ==
- Yuen Biao as Lee King-tong (李敬堂), a Hong Kong police inspector working undercover in the Philippines since 1992 where he is part of a local Chinatown triad and also worked with a Japanese drug dealer in 1994 where he was arrested twice and imprisoned for a year.
- Cynthia Khan as Yang Lai-ching (楊麗菁), a police captain from Shenzhen, China.
- Waise Lee as Roy (阿威), a counterfeiter from Hong Kong living in the Philippines.
- Monsour Del Rosario as Santos (山度士), a Filipino major of the Police Special Unit who is Lee's contact and friend.
- Yuen Wah as a drug dealer in Shenzhen who kills his client after the transaction before being arrested by Yang.
- Billy Chow as Roy's boss who is the leader of a major counterfeiting organization.
- Tam Suk-mui as Yu Wing-kei (于泳褀), Roy's girlfriend who was once rescued by him and was used as a scapegoat by him.
- Jerry Bailey as Ramos (拉莫斯), Roy's mild-mannered partner.
- Peter Chan as the drug buyer in Shenzhen who was killed by the drug dealer after paying him during Yang's raid.
- Shum Wai as Mr. Ng (吳先生), the boss's client from Hong Kong who is Peter Ng's older brother.
- Wong Ngok-wah
- Lam Ngok-wah as a Hong Kong police superintendent and Lee's superior officer who briefs Yang and Santos about the joint operation.
- Alan Chui as Peter Ng (吳彼得), Mr. Ng's younger brother who was once arrested by Lee in Hong Kong in the past.
- Alex Man as Officer Man (萬Sir), Santos' superior officer. (guest star)
- Lily Leung as officer Man's mother. (guest star)

== Reception ==
=== Critical reception ===
Andrew Saroch of Far East Films gave the film a score of 3/5 stars, praising the film's action set pieces and the cast's performances. Love HK Film describes the film as "remarkably cheap and sophomoric."

=== Box office ===
The film grossed HK$1,688,100 at the Hong Kong box office during its theatrical run from December 15 to 28, 1995.

== See also ==
- Yuen Biao filmography
- Yuen Wah filmography
