= The Young Dragons =

1974 Hong Kong film by John Woo

- Traditional Chinese: 鐵漢柔情
- Literal meaning: Tough Man's Tenderness
- Hanyu Pinyin: Tiě hàn róu qíng
- Directed by: John Woo
- Written by: Ni Kuang; John Woo
- Produced by: Raymond Chow
- Cinematography: Jimmy Yu Chun
- Edited by: Peter Cheung; Chin Chang-chun
- Music by: Li Yi-chi
- Distributed by: Golden Harvest Company
- Release date: 18 April 1974 (Taiwan); 12 September 1975 (Hong Kong)
- Running time: 95 minutes
- Country: Hong Kong
- Language: Cantonese

The Young Dragons (Chinese: 鐵漢柔情; lit. 'Tough Man's Tenderness') is a 1974 Hong Kong martial arts film directed by John Woo in his feature film directorial debut and his second collaboration with Jackie Chan, who acted as martial arts choreographer.

== Plot ==
In Longshan Town crime boss Long and his bodyguard Yun Fei arrange the import a load of guns from Lei Hu, but some men led by Brother Jin stop the transport. Jin takes one gun and has his men dump the rest of the guns into the ocean. Jin begins staying with Rouge in her room at a brothel. Later, while on a bridge, Fan Ming helps Jin fight off Yun Fei and his men. Jin asks Fan Ming what his name is, but he simply calls himself a passer-by. Fan Ming goes to meet his love Yan Hong, whose father Mr. Ye was killed by Long for refusing to join in the gun smuggling. There he also finds their friend Xiaohong and Xiaohong's sister.

Jin sells the gun he took to Lei Hu for a high price to get his attention and sets up a gun deal, but when Lei Hu's men come to receive the promised guns the only find empty boxes bearing Japanese labels. Jin and his men defeat them and take their money.

Meanwhile, Yun Fei tells Long that Fan Ming, the leader of the inspectors in Shanghai, has come to town. Yun Fei has sworn vengeance against Fan Ming for killing one of his sworn brothers in the past, and Long tells him to have Fan Ming captured. Yun Fei and his men kidnap Xiaohong's sister to convince Xiaohong to lie to Fan Ming that Long is setting up a gun deal at White Stone Hill. Jin's assistant Guy tells him about the meeting at White Stone Hill, so Jin and Guy show up as well. Yun Fei and his men kill Xiaohong, Fan Ming and Guy while Long watches. Jin goes to the Ye residence and tells Yan Hong about Fan Ming's death, telling her to come with him for safety from Long and his men. Jin convinces Rouge to let Yan Hong secretly stay in her room at the brothel, paying the brothel keeper to reserve Rouge's time.

Long demands the guns from Lei Hu, who insists that Jin still has them. Lei Hu meets with Jin, who was that he will give Long the guns if Long gives him the man who killed Fan Ming. He agrees to meet in two days, but Long worries that Lei Hu will get impatient, so Lei Hu arranges for Rouge and other girls from the brothel to come to Long's to entertain Yun Fei, Long and Le Hu that night. Yan Hong dresses up like one of the other girls to gain access to Long's residence, where she attacks Long and but is defeated by Yun Fei. Rouge attacks Lei Hu and is also defeated by Yun Fei.

Fan Ming is shown to still be alive as Police Chief Ma apologizes to him for allowing him to be injured and almost killed during the investigation of Long's gun smuggling operation. Jin's message deliverer arrives and tells them that Jin is leading an attack on Long's residence, so Fan Ming and the other police rush there. Jin kills Long and Lei Hu, then finds Yun Fei waiting for him. After a lengthy battle, they break each other's neck and both die. Fan Ming and the police arrive and find the corpses.

== Cast ==
- Tien Ni as Yan Hong (Yip Fung)
- Henry Yu Yung as Brother Jin (Brother Kin)
- Hu Chin as Rouge
- Cheng Lei as Lei Hu (Lui Fu)
- Lau Kong as Fan Ming
- Chiang Nan as Boss Long (Boss Lung)
- Fung Hak-on as Yun Fei (Wan Fai)
- Ng Ming-choi as Guy
- Dean Shek Tin as Young brothel customer
- Li Min-lang as Wong Tai Sing
- Fung Ging-man as Boss Yu
- Shing Fui-On as Yun Fei's attendant with bird cage
- Sai Gwa-pau as Brothel keeper
- John Woo as Jin's message deliverer (cameo)
- Yuen Bun as Yun Fei's assistant
- Ho Kwong-ming as Xiaohong (Siu Hung)
- Wan Ling-kwong as Police Chief Ma
- Fung Ming as Boss Yu's partner
- Chui Hing-chun as Yan Hong's father Mr. Ye
- Jackie Chan (Stand-in for Rope Guys)
- Mars as Lei Hu's thug
- Corey Yuen as Lei Hu's thug
- Alan Chui Chung-San as Tai Sing's Thug (extra)
- Lung Fong (extra)
- Tsui Siu-Ming (extra)
- Chung Fat (extra)
- Ng Yuen Jun (extra)

== Production ==
The film was shot in Hong Kong.

Jackie Chan was hired as a stunt coordinator and fight choreographer for the film and is credited under the name Yuan Lung Chen. In the book John Woo: Interviews by Robert K. Elder, John Woo recalls, "We knew each other before I made the movie. I always liked his work. He was such a hardworking guy and always had some good ideas. At the time he liked to imitate Bruce Lee. The way he fought, his choreography was pretty much like Bruce's action. Besides that, I also liked him. I worked with him on The Manchurian, (Note: John Woo misspoke here. He said Man zhou ren, a different film for which he was assistant director that was released as The Godfathers of Hong Kong in English, but the film with Jackie Chan was actually Fist to Fist.) [in which] he was one of the main characters. I was the assistant director for that film so we actually worked together in a film before The Young Dragons."

The film was originally independently produced in 1973 under the title 過客 (literally "Passer-by", the name Fan Ming originally gives for himself, but John Woo gave the film the English title Farewell, Buddy). The government censor board deemed the film too violent, so it was shelved. Golden Harvest saw promise in the film, paid for reshoots, and released it under the name The Young Dragons, signing Woo to a three-year contract.

== Reception ==
Reviewer Sean Gilman of thechinesecinema.com wrote, "Kind of exactly what you'd expect from John Woo's first film. A low-budget picture (Golden Harvest) with lofty aspirations, the influences are obvious: Peckinpah's slo-motion, Chang Cheh's doomed antiheroes, an unusually heightened (for a cheap genre film of the time) focus on sound and natural imagery that recalls Kurosawa, Leone, and King Hu (wind rustling through tall grass, a setting sun that backlights two fighting men, shafts of light and shadow a world away from the flat studios of the Shaw Brothers). [...] The action is fast and athletically messy, grimier than Chang’s films (with their stately choreography by Lau Kar-leung and Tong Kai)."

Reviewer Kenneth Brorsson of sogoodreviews.com wrote, "Ideas about style and themes he picked up by working with master Chang Cheh but he's not able to put inspiration to full use. It was to come but the very non-distinctive plot with Henry Yung as a robber of ammunition belonging to the rich feels very sketchy. A fact made even more apparent because it clearly doesn't want to be. Truth be told there are mature passages that approaches semi-decent considering the genre output not trying on that wardrobe always but the character-comrade between Yung and Lau Kong that very much is an integral part comes to fruition only to the point where we can say to ourselves that it was to become very much better. [...] The co-directed Jackie Chan action stands out very little aside from an energetic end that is helped along by Fung Hark-On's vicious presence."

In the book John Woo: The Films, author Kenneth E. Hall writes, "The Young Dragons bears the strong influence of Chang Cheh (especially his Vengeance), both in its staging (several scenes of corruptly sensual gangsters in lacquered surroundings) and in its choreography (extended wing chun sequences). This is hardly surprising given Woo's apprenticeship with Chang. But even in this early film (and, in fact, rather more clearly than in some of the later pre-1986 films by Woo), one can discern marks of Woo's later style and themes. We can see the prototypes for Woo's familiar tracking shots, as he brings the camera sharply closer into the faces of the main characters."

Reviewer morpheus of kungfufandom.com wrote, "The Young Dragons is a very good first offering. While there are a couple of loose ends, and the friendship as well as the onscreen chemistry between Jian and Fan Ming could have used more screen time to develop, the film is quite entertaining and well worth 94 minutes of time. [...] Over time, Woo would greatly refine his skills behind the camera; but this initial effort is a little gem -albeit a bit rough around the edges."

A review on serp.media reads, "'The Young Dragons', also known as 'Tie han rou qing', is a riveting action movie from 1974 directed by Asian powerhouse John Woo. Woo, who is no stranger to epic action scenes, took the helm for his directorial debut in this film, and it showcases his passion for adrenaline-pumping fight sequences."

The website onderhond.com gave the film a rating of 2.5 out of 5.
