= Marx Cheung =

Hong Kong actor (born 1954/1955)

- 張雷
- Born: Cheung Lui; 1954 or 1955 (age 71–72)
- Occupations: Actor; television host
- Years active: 1970–present
- Spouse: Cheng Suk-yee (m. 2017)

Marx Cheung Lui (Chinese: 張雷, born 1954/1955) is a Hong Kong film and television actor and the vice president of the Hong Kong Action Stuntmen Guild known for his role as Jinlun Fawang in the TVB series The Return of the Condor Heroes (1983). Born into a family of martial arts practitioners, he won the championship in the Hong Kong Wushu Open Competition.

== Biography ==
Cheung was born into a family of martial arts practitioners. His father was a boxer. Cheung is the eleventh among eleven brothers and sisters in his family. He started learning Shaolin Kung Fu at the age of four and studied Southern Shaolin Rou Kung Fu for another ten years. He once won the championship in the Hong Kong Wushu Open Competition organised by the Hong Kong Chinese Martial Arts Association.

Cheung graduated from Hong Kong Pei Kiu Secondary School and taught boxing at the age of 18 opening a martial arts gym in Wan Chai later. As he entered the industry in 1970, he became a martial arts instructor.

In 1975, he was recognised by the TV station director and joined the TVB TV series CID.

Cheung had also worked as a behind-the-scenes stuntman for popular Hong Kong TV series such as The Big Husband.

Later, in 1980, he formed the "Kamikaze Stunt Team" with 17 martial artists. A few years later, it was renamed "Hong Kong Stunt Team" and he continued to film movies and TV series such as The Best Partner, Plain Jane to the Rescue and Destruction. The team also performed in the special effects scenes of Land Car, Escape from Sai Ying Pun, Dragon Tiger and Interstellar Blunt Tire. At the same time, a garage was opened to repair the own stunt team and outside cars.

In addition to appearing on television, he had also appeared in movies. It was not until January 1988 that the contract with TVB was completed, and Cheung participated in the filming work of the Malaysian Landscape Film and Television Production Company in the same year. Apart from TV-series, he also worked as the stunt coordinator for the production company.

In the 1990s, he continued to perform in works produced by Shanshui Film and Television. Currently, Cheung is still active in the Hong Kong entertainment industry and performs on stage abroad.
