= Princess Chang Ping (film) =

1976 Hong Kong film by John Woo

- Traditional Chinese: 帝女花
- Literal meaning: The Flower Princess
- Hanyu Pinyin: Dì Nǚ Huā
- Jyutping: Dai3 Neoi5 Faa1
- Directed by: John Woo
- Written by: Tang Disheng; John Woo
- Produced by: Raymond Chow (executive producer); Xue Zhixiong
- Starring: Lung Kim-sung; Mui Shuet-shi
- Cinematography: Cheung Yiu-jo
- Edited by: Peter Cheung
- Music by: Joseph Koo; Chu Chi-Hsiang
- Distributed by: Golden Harvest Productions; Golden Phoenix
- Release date: 30 January 1976 (Hong Kong)
- Running time: 102 minutes
- Country: Hong Kong
- Language: Cantonese

Princess Chang Ping (Chinese: 帝女花; pinyin: Dì nǚ huā; lit. 'The Flower Princess') is a 1976 Hong Kong Cantonese opera film directed John Woo. It is a remake of director Wong Tin-lam's 1959 film Tragedy of the Emperor's Daughter, itself based on the Cantonese opera Di Nü Hua (The Flower Princess). Tang Disheng, one of the co-writers of the 1959 film, retains a story credit for the 1976 remake.

== Plot ==
Just as Chow Shih Hsien has wooed Princess Chang Ping with his witty wordplay, the Manchu forces descend upon the palace. The Emperor orders his wives and children to kill themselves before the enemies arrive. When Chang Ping refuses to do so, her father stabs at her and kills her sister instead. He then slashes Chang Ping's arm with a sword, believing her to be dead as he flees. Princess Chang Ping is taken away to recover in a secret location. Chow Shih Hsien, having been knocked unconscious, awakes believing his love to be dead but later discovers her at a monastery, and the two become targets of machinations by the remaining Ming elites.

== Cast ==
- Lung Kim-Sang as Chow Shih Hsien (a.k.a. Chow Sai Hin)
- Mui Shuet-Sze as Princess Chang Ping (a.k.a. Princess Cheung Ping)
- Liang Tsi-Pak as Empertor/Manchurian King (2 roles)
- Leung Sing-Bo as Chou Chung (a.k.a. Chow Chung)
- Kong Suet-Liu as Chou Siu-Lan (a.k.a. Chow Shui Laan)
- Jue Kim-Daan as Chou Bo-Lun (a.k.a. Chow Bo Lun)
- Chu Siu-Boh as Chien
- Li Fung as Princess Yuen
- Yin Suet-Fan as Princess Chou
- Leung Kar-Bo as Princess Chiu Yan

== Production ==
The film was shot in Hong Kong.

== Reception ==
The review on serp.media reads, "This classic film is a testament to the richness of Chinese culture and the timeless beauty of opera."

Reviewer Sean Gilman of Seattle Screen Scene wrote, "The film isn't as glossy or elaborate as the huangmei films the Shaw brothers specialized in before they shifted into martial arts movies (Li Han-hsiang films like The Love Eterne or The Enchanting Shadow) but as mid-70s Golden Harvest productions go, it’s pretty ornate (helped no doubt by the fact that it only has three or four sets). Woo's camera moves fluidly, emphasizing the theatricality of the world and performances rather than reinforcing it to an alienating degree."

The website onderhond.com gave the film a rating of 1.5 out of 5. The review reads, "John Woo doing Chinese opera sounds intriguing, but the result is mostly just grating and tiresome. The film looks nice enough and the romantic plot is sufficient, but the music is ever-present and did get on my nerves after a while. Unless you're a big fan of Chinese opera, or a Woo completist, you might think twice about watching this one."

Jeremy Carr of Senses of Cinema called the film "a lavish, operatic melodrama that is certainly staid by comparison to his action films and is somewhat burdened by its histrionic effects, but evinces an impressive, mannered vision of war and romance; it is a tragic, emotionally potent, and decorative love story."

In an interview in the book John Woo: The Interviews, John Woo recalled, "I must say, my movie called Princess Chang Ping, which I made in 1975. That movie made me feel like I was a real filmmaker. I love that movie so much. Before that, I wasn't sure of myself. I knew I had made a movie, but my movie wasn't that great. It was like practicing the skill, the technique, you know, a working experience. But Princess Chang Ping, the movie gave me a very strong feeling. It was the first time in a few ways that I really controlled everything and made a movie as my own personality."
