= The Awaken Punch =

1973 Hong Kong film by Fong Lung-Seung

- Film poster
- Directed by: Fong Lung-Seung
- Written by: Fong Lung-Seung; Cory B. Sarangaya
- Produced by: Jimmy L. Pascual
- Starring: Chan Sing; Henry Yu Young; Au-Yeung Pooi-Saan; Tien Feng; Maang Lee; Kenneth Tsang Kong; Got Heung-Ting; Suen Lam; Fong Yau; San Kuai
- Cinematography: Hua Shan
- Edited by: Kwok Ting-Hung
- Music by: Chow Fook-Leung
- Production companies: Fu Kuo Film Company; Empire Cinema Center Ltd.
- Distributed by: Dak Lee Film Company, Ltd. (Hong Kong)
- Release date: 23 May 1973
- Running time: 92 minutes
- Country: Hong Kong
- Language: Mandarin
- Box office: HK$439,052 (Hong Kong); 201,862 tickets (France)

The Awaken Punch (Chinese: 石破天惊, also known as 红狼醒拳) is a 1973 Hong Kong martial arts film directed by Fong Lung-Seung. The film is as an early example of Yuen Wo Ping's fight choreography and features Jackie Chan as an extra.

== Plot ==
Henry Yu Yang plays a young man, Cheung Da Gong, who travels from place to place earning a living as a fighter. He fights at times on a stage before spectators, as a hired body guard and altruistically to protect shopkeepers from thugs looking to collect protection money.

One day Cheung receives a letter which prompts him to return home where his elderly father is sick and dying. At his father's death bed Cheung vows at his father's behest to stay and work his family's farm and to give up fighting.

Local gangsters try to buy Cheung's land and when Cheung refuses attempt to intimidate him first through threats and then by burning down his house, killing Cheung's sister and mother in the process.

Cheung motivated by revenge hunts down the gangsters eventually tracking down their leader and killing him. The movie ends with Cheung submitting to the local authorities when he is arrested on charges of murder with the local deputy admonishing him, "You should have left retribution to the law."

== Cast ==
- Henry Yu Yang as Cheung Da Gong
- Au-Yeung Pui San as Jun Shen
- Tien Feng as Mr. Wong
- Mang Lee as brothel Madam
- Kenneth Tsang Goes to Law
- Suen Lam as Commissioner
- San Kuai as Li (Black Fan)
- Fong Yau as Pai (White Fan)
- Fung Hark-On as Tsao Szu Hu one of the main thugs
- Lee Chiu as one of the main thugs

=== Extras/Supporting Role ===
Some of the well known Hong Kong extras from the 70s both from Shaw Brothers and Golden Harvest have participated for this film.

- Yuen Woo-ping - Mr. Wong's Top Henchman
- Yuen Cheung-yan - Mr. Wong's Henchman with Spear
- Yuen Shun-yi - Mr. Wong's Thug in the forest
- Yuen Jan-Yeung - Mr. Wong's Henchman with Tonfa
- Yuen Yat Chor - Mr. Wong's Henchman with Knife
- Yuen Wah - Court Deputy/Thug Harassing Jun Suen at the Park
- Jackie Chan - Thug Beating Up a Woman (Cameo)
- Chin Yuet-Sang - Thug Harassing Jun Suen at the Park/Mr. Wong's Henchman with Knife
- Corey Yuen - Thug Harassing Jun Suen at the Park/Thug at the Peer
- Mars - Contestant Fighting Cheung Da Gong (Cameo)
- Alan Chui Chung-San - Mr. Wong's Henchman with Knife (Cameo)
- Alan Chan Kwok Kuen - Town Loan Shark Thug (Cameo)
- Yuen Biao - Thug at the Peer (Cameo)
- Wynn Lau Chun Fai - Mr. Wong's Henchman with Knife
- Tang Tak Cheung - Town Loan Shark Thug
- Lee Hang - Town Loan Shark Thug
- Chan Siu Kai - Town Loan Shark Thug
- Kong Cheun - Town Loan Shark Thug
- Joe Cheung - Town Villager (Cameo)
- Lee Tin Ying - Mr. Wong's Henchman with Spear
- Addy Sung Gam Loi - Thug at the Peer
