= John Woo =

Hong Kong filmmaker (born 1947)

John Woo SBS
- 吳宇森
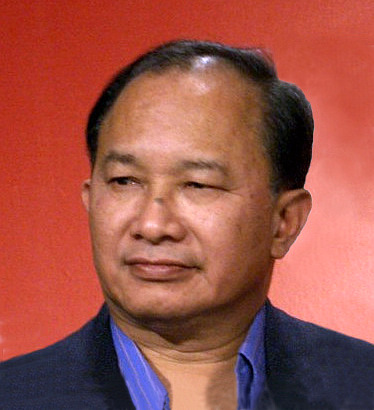
- Woo in 2005
- Born: Wu Yu-seng; 1 May 1946 (age 80); Guangzhou, China
- Occupations: Film director; screenwriter; producer
- Years active: 1968–present
- Spouse: Anne Chun-Lung Niu (m. 1976)
- Children: 3

Chinese name
- Traditional Chinese: 吳宇森
- Simplified Chinese: 吴宇森
Transcriptions
Standard Mandarin
- Hanyu Pinyin: Wú Yǔsēn
- Wade–Giles: Wu^{2} Yü^{3}-sen^{1}
- IPA: [ǔ ỳsə́n]
Yue: Cantonese
- Yale Romanization: Ǹgh Yúhsām
- Jyutping: Ng4 Jyu5-sam1
- IPA: [ŋ̍˩ jy˩˧sɐm˥]

John Woo Yu-sen (Chinese: 吳宇森; born 1 May 1946) is a Hong Kong filmmaker, known as a highly influential figure in the action film genre. The recipient of various accolades, including a Hong Kong Film Award for Best Picture, Best Director, and Best Editing, as well as a Golden Horse Award, an Asia Pacific Screen Award and a Saturn Award, he is regarded as a pioneer of heroic bloodshed films and the gun fu genre in Hong Kong action cinema. He is known for his highly chaotic "bullet ballet" action sequences, stylized imagery, Mexican standoffs, frequent use of slow motion and allusions to wuxia, film noir and Western cinema.

Considered one of the major figures of Hong Kong cinema, Woo has directed several notable action films. He is known for his collaborations with actor Chow Yun-fat in five Hong Kong action films: A Better Tomorrow (1986), which made Chow a box-office superstar in Asia, A Better Tomorrow II (1987), The Killer (1989), Once a Thief (1991), and Hard Boiled (1992). He has also directed martial arts films such as The Dragon Tamers (1975), Hand of Death (1975), and Last Hurrah for Chivalry (1979), and action comedies such as Follow the Star (1978), From Riches to Rags (1980), Run, Tiger, Run (1984), and the aforementioned Once a Thief.

Hard Target (1993), starring Jean-Claude Van Damme, was his American directorial debut, and the first major Hollywood film directed by a Chinese – and more broadly, Asian – filmmaker. His other Hollywood films include Broken Arrow (1996), Face/Off (1997) and Mission: Impossible 2 (2000). He made his Canadian debut with the action comedy film Once a Thief (1996), which is a remake of Woo's 1991 film of the same name. He continued to be active in Hong Kong cinema, directing films such as the two-part historical epic The Crossing (2014). His first Chinese-language feature since Hard Boiled (1992) was the internationally co-produced Red Cliff (2008–2009), which broke the Chinese box office record previously held by Titanic in mainland China.

Woo is the creator of the comic series Seven Brothers, published by Virgin Comics. He is the founder and chairman of the production company Lion Rock Productions.

== Early life ==
Woo was born as Wu Yu-seng (Ng Yu-sum in Cantonese) on 1 May 1946, in Guangzhou, China, amidst the chaotic Chinese Civil War. Due to school age restrictions, his mother changed his birth date to 22 September 1948, which is what remains on his passport. The Woo family, who were Protestant Christians, faced persecution during Mao Zedong's early anti-bourgeois purges after the communist revolution in China, and fled to Hong Kong when he was five.

Impoverished, the Woo family lived in the slums at Shek Kip Mei. His father was a teacher, though rendered unable to work by tuberculosis, and his mother was a manual laborer on construction sites. The family was rendered homeless by the Shek Kip Mei Fire of 1953. Charitable donations from disaster relief efforts enabled the family to relocate; however, violent crime had by then become commonplace in Hong Kong housing projects. At age three he was diagnosed with a serious medical condition. Following surgery on his spine, he was unable to walk correctly until eight years old, and as a result his right leg is shorter than his left leg.

His Christian upbringing shows influences in his films. As a young boy, Woo had wanted to be a Christian minister. He later found a passion for movies influenced by the French New Wave especially Jean-Pierre Melville. Woo has said he was shy and had difficulty speaking, but found making movies a way to explore his feelings and thinking and would "use movies as a language".

Woo found respite in Bob Dylan and in American Westerns. He has stated the final scene of Butch Cassidy and the Sundance Kid made a particular impression on him in his youth: the device of two comrades, each of whom fire pistols from each hand, is a recurrent spectacle later found in his own work.

== Career ==
=== 1969–1985: Career beginnings in Hong Kong ===
In 1969, Woo was hired as a script supervisor at Cathay Studios. In 1971, he became an assistant director at Shaw Studios. The same year, he watched Bruce Lee's The Big Boss, which left a strong impression on him due to how different it was from earlier martial arts films. Lee's films inspired Woo to direct his own action films. Woo worked as assistant director for some films directed by Chang Cheh during the 1970s, and took inspiration from Cheh's work. His directorial debut in 1974 was the feature film The Young Dragons. In the kung fu film genre, it was choreographed by Jackie Chan. The film was picked up by Golden Harvest Studio, where he went on to direct more martial arts films. He later had success as a comedy director with Money Crazy (1977), starring Hong Kong comedian Ricky Hui and Richard Ng.

=== 1986–1992: 'Heroic Bloodshed', breakthrough and international recognition ===
By the mid-1980s, Woo was experiencing occupational burnout. Several of his films were commercial disappointments, and he felt a distinct lack of creative control. It was during this period of self-imposed exile that director/producer Tsui Hark provided the funding for Woo to film a longtime pet project, A Better Tomorrow (1986). The story of two brothers—one a law enforcement officer, the other a criminal—was a financial blockbuster. A Better Tomorrow became a defining achievement in Hong Kong action cinema.

John Woo: Interviews includes a 36-page interview with Woo by editor Robert K. Elder, which documents the years 1968 to 1990. It includes Woo's early career in working on comedies, his work on kung fu films (during which time he gave Jackie Chan one of his first major film roles), and more recently, his gunpowder morality plays in Hong Kong. In 1992, during a Toronto International Film Festival press conference for Reservoir Dogs, Quentin Tarantino revealed he wrote a screenplay for a film directed by Woo, but went unproduced.

=== 1993–2000: Move to the United States and international success ===
An émigré in 1993, the director experienced difficulty in cultural adjustment while contracted with Universal Studios to direct Jean-Claude Van Damme in Hard Target. Like other foreign national film directors confronted with the Hollywood environment, Woo was unaccustomed to pervasive management concerns over matters such as limitations on violence and completion schedules. When initial cuts failed to yield an "R" rated film, the studio assumed control of the project and edited footage to produce a cut "suitable for American audiences".

A three-year hiatus saw Woo next direct John Travolta and Christian Slater in Broken Arrow. A frenetic chase-themed film, the director once again found himself hampered by studio management and editorial concerns. Despite a larger budget than his previous Hard Target, the final feature lacked the trademark Woo style. Public reception saw modest financial success.

Reluctant to pursue projects which would necessarily entail front-office controls, the director cautiously rejected the script for Face/Off several times until it was rewritten to suit him. (The futuristic setting was changed to a contemporary one.) Paramount Pictures also offered the director significantly more freedom to exercise his speciality: emotional characterisation and elaborate action. A complex story of adversaries—each of whom surgically alters their identity—law enforcement agent John Travolta and terrorist Nicolas Cage play a cat-and-mouse game, trapped in each other's outward appearance. Face/Off opened in 1997 to critical acclaim and strong attendance. Grosses in the United States exceeded $100 million. Face/Off was also nominated for an Academy Award in the category Sound Effects Editing (Mark Stoeckinger) at the 70th Academy Awards.

Around this period, Woo would also produce and direct several film and TV projects. In 1996, Woo produced and directed Once a Thief, a Canadian made-for-television remake of Woo's 1991 caper film. The teleplay subsequently spawned a television series of the same name, which Woo executive produced. In 1998, Woo directed Blackjack, which featured Dolph Lundgren as a leukophobic bodyguard who hunts down an assassin. The film was intended as a backdoor pilot for a television series, but was not picked up. That same year, Woo served as executive producer and action choreographer on Antoine Fuqua's directorial debut The Replacement Killers, which featured Chow Yun-Fat's first international starring role.

At the start of the new millennium, Woo directed Mission: Impossible 2, the second entry in the Tom Cruise-led action film series. Despite receiving mixed reviews, Mission: Impossible 2 grossed over $549 million worldwide, becoming the highest-grossing film of 2000, as well as of Woo's career. With a total North American gross of $215.4 million, it was also ranked third among the highest-grossing films of that year domestically, after Cast Away and How the Grinch Stole Christmas.

=== 2001–2007: Decline in Hollywood and other ventures ===
Woo made two additional films in Hollywood: Windtalkers (2002) and Paycheck (2003), both of which fared poorly at the box office and were summarily dismissed by critics. Also in 2003, Woo directed a television pilot entitled The Robinsons: Lost in Space for The WB Television Network, based on the 1960s television series Lost in Space. The pilot was not purchased.

Woo also directed and produced the 2007 video game Stranglehold, which is a sequel to his 1992 film, Hard Boiled. The game features Woo as a multiplayer playable character. That same year he produced the anime movie, Appleseed: Ex Machina, the sequel to Shinji Aramaki's 2004 film Appleseed.

=== 2008–2017: Red Cliff and return to Asian cinema ===
In 2008, Woo returned to Asian cinema with the completion of the two-part epic war film Red Cliff, based on a historical battle from Records of the Three Kingdoms. Produced on a grand scale, it is his first film in China since he emigrated from Hong Kong to the United States in 1993. Part 1 of the film was released throughout Asia in July 2008, to generally favourable reviews and strong attendance. Part 2 was released in China in January 2009.

Woo was presented with a Golden Lion award for lifetime achievement at the Venice Film Festival in 2010. At this time, Woo also served as co-director and producer of the 2010 wuxia film Reign of Assassins, starring Michelle Yeoh. He followed Red Cliff with another two-part film, The Crossing, in 2014 and 2015. Featuring an all-star cast, the four-hour epic tells the parallel stories of several characters who all ultimately find themselves passengers on the doomed Taiping steamer, which sank in 1949 en route from mainland China to Taiwan and has been described as "China's Titanic". Following the box-office disappointment of The Crossing, Woo and producer Terence Chang disbanded Lion Rock Productions.

Woo followed up The Crossing with Manhunt, a remake of the 1976 Japanese crime thriller of the same name. Production started on Manhunt in June 2016 in Osaka and later reported to be finished filming by the end of November. The film, co-led by Chinese actor Zhang Hanyu and Japanese actor Masaharu Fukuyama, features a large Japanese cast including Yasuaki Kurata, Jun Kunimura, Hiroyuki Ikeuchi, Nanami Sakuraba, Naoto Takenaka and Tao Okamoto. In addition, Chinese actress Qi Wei, Korean actress Ha Ji-won and Woo's daughter Angeles were cast in key roles in the film. The film was released in China on 24 November 2017.

=== 2021–present: Silent Night and return to Hollywood ===
Following another hiatus, Woo returned to Hollywood to direct the action thriller Silent Night, where a normal father heads into the underworld to avenge his young son's death. Produced by Basil Iwanyk, the film starred Joel Kinnaman and was told entirely without dialogue. It was Woo's first American feature film since Paycheck (2003).

Woo commented in 2015 that he would remake The Killer for American audiences. Initially, actress Lupita Nyong'o had been cast for the lead role, however by March 2023, Nathalie Emmanuel was cast instead, with Omar Sy joining the film as the cop character. The film was directed by Woo, produced by Universal Studios and released exclusively on Peacock.

In September 2024, Woo's official Instagram account and the social media accounts of the duo Sparks all posted a photo of Woo with members Ron and Russell Mael, strongly hinting at collaborating on a "new project" which would not be an action film. The hashtag #xcrucior points to a musical Sparks have been developing with Focus Features as their follow-up to Annette and sought a director for. Woo has previously tried to get musical projects in production, and shares a love of French cinema and Jaques Demy's The Umbrellas of Cherbourg with the Mael brothers. He later confirmed it to be a "half-musical".

=== Unrealized film projects ===
In May 2008, Woo announced in Cannes that his next movie would be 1949, an epic love story set between the end of World War II and Chinese Civil War to the founding of the People's Republic of China, the shooting of which would take place in China and Taiwan. Its production was due to begin by the end of 2008, with a theatrical release planned in December 2009. However, in early April 2009, the film was cancelled due to script right issues. Reports indicated that Woo might be working on another World War II film, this time about the American Volunteer Group, or the Flying Tigers. The movie was tentatively titled "Flying Tiger Heroes" and Woo is reported as saying it will feature "The most spectacular aerial battle scenes ever seen in Chinese cinema." It was not clear whether Woo would not be directing the earlier war film, or whether it was put on the back burner. Woo has stated that Flying Tiger Heroes would be an "extremely important production" and will "emphasise US-Chinese friendship and the contributions of the Flying Tigers and the Yunnan people during the war of resistance." Woo has announced he will be using IMAX cameras to film the Flying Tigers project. "It has always been a dream of mine to explore shooting with IMAX cameras and to work in the IMAX format, and the strong visual element of this film is incredibly well-suited to the tastes of cinemagoers today [...] Using IMAX for Flying Tigers would create a new experience for the audience, and I think it would be another breakthrough for Chinese movies".

== Personal life ==
Woo has been married to Annie Woo Ngau Chun-lung since 1976. They have two daughters, Kimberley Woo, Angeles Woo, and a son Frank Woo. He is a Christian and told BBC in an interview that he believes in God and has utmost admiration for Jesus, whom he calls a "great philosopher".

His three favorite films are David Lean's Lawrence of Arabia, Akira Kurosawa's Seven Samurai and Jean-Pierre Melville's Le Samouraï. A complete list of his 48 inspirational films was published in May 2018. As of July 2024, Woo is the only filmmaker who has listed The Bridge on the River Kwai by David Lean and Zorba the Greek by Michael Cacoyannis as favorites on LaCinetek, a French website that collects and publishes lists from film directors.

== Filmography ==
=== Feature film ===
Year	Title	Functioned as			Notes
Year	Title	Director	Writer	Producer	Notes
1974	The Young Dragons	Yes	Yes	No	
1975	The Dragon Tamers	Yes	Yes	No	
1975	Hand of Death	Yes	Yes	No	
1976	Princess Chang Ping	Yes	Yes	No	
1977	Money Crazy	Yes	Yes	No	
1978	Hello, Late Homecomers	Yes	Yes	No	
1978	Follow the Star	Yes	No	No	
1979	Last Hurrah for Chivalry	Yes	Yes	No	
1980	From Riches to Rags	Yes	Yes	No	
1980	Laughing Times	Yes	Yes	No	
1982	To Hell with the Devil	Yes	Yes	No	
1982	Plain Jane to the Rescue	Yes	No	No	
1984	Heroes Shed No Tears	Yes	Yes	No	
1984	Run, Tiger, Run	Yes	No	Yes	
1985	The Time You Need a Friend	Yes	Yes	Yes	
1986	A Better Tomorrow	Yes	Yes	Yes	
1987	A Better Tomorrow II	Yes	Yes	No	
1989	The Killer	Yes	Yes	No	
1989	Just Heroes	Yes	No	No	
1990	Bullet in the Head	Yes	Yes	Yes	
1991	Once a Thief	Yes	Yes	No	
1992	Hard Boiled	Yes	Yes	No	
1993	Hard Target	Yes	No	No	
1996	Broken Arrow	Yes	No	No	
1997	Face/Off	Yes	No	No	
2000	Mission: Impossible 2	Yes	No	No	
2002	Windtalkers	Yes	No	Yes	
2003	Paycheck	Yes	No	Yes	
2008	Red Cliff: Part I	Yes	Yes	Yes	
2009	Red Cliff: Part II	Yes	Yes	Yes	
2010	Reign of Assassins	Yes	No	Yes	Co-directed with Su Chao-pin
2014	The Crossing: Part I	Yes	No	Yes	
2015	The Crossing: Part II	Yes	No	Yes	
2017	Manhunt	Yes	No	No	
2023	Silent Night	Yes	No	Yes	
2024	The Killer	Yes	No	Yes	

Producer only

Year	Title	Director	Notes
1989	A Better Tomorrow III: Love & Death in Saigon	Tsui Hark	
1995	Peace Hotel	Wai Ka-fai	
1996	Somebody Up There Likes Me	Patrick Leung	
1998	The Replacement Killers	Antoine Fuqua	Also action choreographer
1998	The Big Hit	Kirk Wong	
2003	Bulletproof Monk	Paul Hunter	
2007	Blood Brothers	Alexi Tan	
2007	Appleseed Ex Machina	Shinji Aramaki	
2009	My Fair Gentleman	Li Ju-Yuan	
2010	A Better Tomorrow	Song Hae-sung	Also writer
2011	Warriors of the Rainbow: Seediq Bale	Wei Te-sheng	

Acting credits

Year	Title	Role
1976	Hand of Death	Scholar Cheng
1978	Follow the Star	Mr. Chen
1986	A Better Tomorrow	Inspector Wu
1990	Bullet in the Head	Police Inspector
1992	Hard Boiled	Bartender

=== Short film ===
Year	Title	Functioned as		Notes
Year	Title	Director	Writer	Notes
1968	Sijie	Yes	Yes	Co-directed with Sek Kei
1968	Ouran	Yes	No	
2005	Song Song and Little Cat	Yes	No	Segment of All the Invisible Children

Producer

- The Glass Beads (2005)

=== Television ===
Year	Title	Functioned as		Notes
Year	Title	Director	Executive Producer	Notes
1996	Once a Thief	Yes	Yes	TV movie
1997–98	Once a Thief	No	Yes	22 episodes
1998	Blackjack	Yes	Yes	TV movie

=== Other works ===
- Airport '98 (Nike commercial) (1998)
- Hostage (part of The Hire, branded content short films for BMW) (2002)
- 7 Brothers (graphic novel) (2006–2007)
- Stranglehold (video game) (2007)
- Bloodstroke (iOS and Android videogame) (2014)
- Asahi Super Dry (Asahi Breweries commercial) (2013)

== Accolades ==
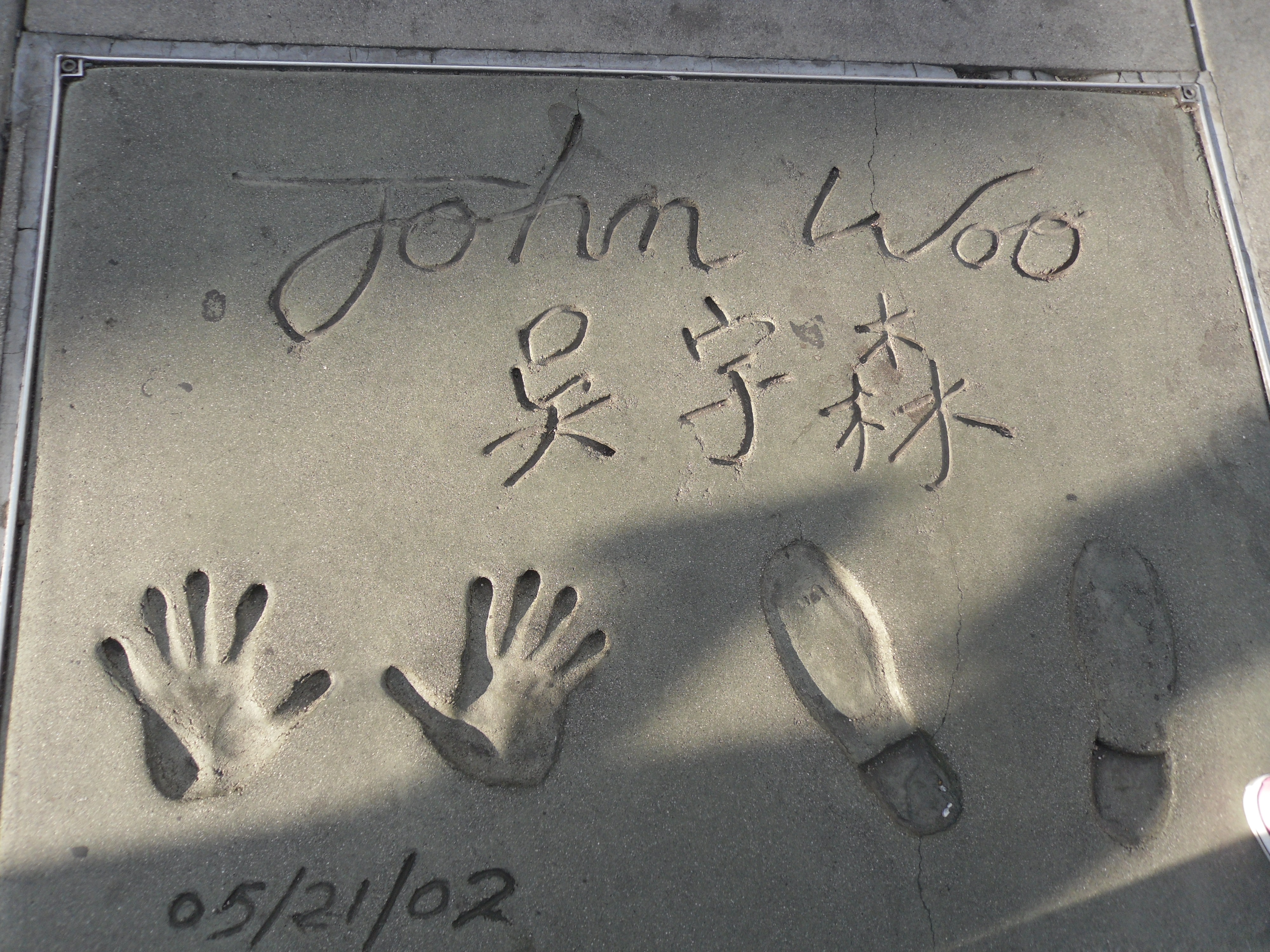
Woo's hand and shoe prints in front of Grauman's Chinese Theatre in Hollywood

Year	Title	Award/Nomination
1986	A Better Tomorrow	Hong Kong Film Award for Best Film; Nominated–Hong Kong Film Award for Best Director; Nominated–Hong Kong Film Award for Best Screenplay
1989	The Killer	Hong Kong Film Award for Best Director; Nominated–Hong Kong Film Award for Best Screenplay
1990	Bullet in the Head	Nominated–Hong Kong Film Award for Best Director
1991	Once a Thief	Nominated–Hong Kong Film Award for Best Director
1993	Hard Target	Nominated–Saturn Award for Best Director
1997	Face/Off	Saturn Award for Best Director
2008	Red Cliff: Part I	Nominated–Asian Film Award for Best Director
2009	Red Cliff: Part II	Nominated–Hong Kong Film Award for Best Film; Nominated–Hong Kong Film Award for Best Director
2010	-	Golden Lion for Lifetime Achievement–67th Venice International Film Festival
2022	-	Career Achievement Award–26th Fantasia International Film Festival

== See also ==
- Cinema of China
- Cinema of Hong Kong
