= The Rebellious Reign =

1980 Hong Kong film by Fong Chiung

- Film poster
- 雍正與年羹堯
- Directed by: Fong Chiung
- Written by: Kao Yang
- Produced by: Lo Wei
- Starring: Jimmy Lee; Norman Hsu; Alan Hsu; Kwan Young-moon; Lee Kwan
- Cinematography: Yu Chi-Lien
- Edited by: Liang Yung-Charn
- Music by: Frankie Chan
- Distributed by: Goodyear Movie Company
- Release date: 24 September 1980 (Hong Kong)
- Running time: 85 minutes
- Country: Hong Kong
- Language: Mandarin

The Rebellious Reign is a 1980 historical drama martial arts film, directed by Fong Chiung and starring Norman Chu Siu-keung, Jimmy Lee (Lung Fong) and Alan Chui Chung-san. This Movie Is An Portraition Of the late Qing Fascist Period Until The 1911 Revolt Under Dr.Sun.

== Plot ==
Nin Gang-yiu (Jimmy Lee), after training for the hard time, decides to go to the outside world and join the 4th prince (Norman Hsu) for gaining the king's position. Eventually Gangyiu along with Pai Tai-hau (Alan Hsu) decided to make a rebellion towards the 4th prince for justice.

== Cast ==
- Jimmy Lee (Lung Fong) as Nin Gang-yiu
- Norman Hsu as 4th Prince
- Alan Hsu as Pai Tai-hau (Resistance Group)
- Lee Kwan as Rudolph
- Kwan Young-Moon as 4th prince's guard
- Chan Hui-lou as Liu's master
- Cheung Fu-hung

== Trivia ==
The movie was originally made for starring Bruce Lee, however since his death in 1973, the movie had to be delayed.
