= From Riches to Rags =

1980 Hong Kong film by John Woo

Chinese name
- Traditional Chinese: 錢作怪
Transcriptions
Standard Mandarin
- Hanyu Pinyin: qián zuò guài
Yue: Cantonese
- Jyutping: cin2 zok3 gwaai3
- Directed by: John Woo
- Written by: John Woo
- Produced by: Raymond Chow
- Starring: Ricky Hui
- Music by: Sam Hui
- Production company: Golden Harvest
- Release date: 7 October 1980
- Running time: 101 minutes
- Country: Hong Kong
- Language: Cantonese

From Riches to Rags (Chinese: 錢作怪) is a 1980 Hong Kong action comedy film. It was written and directed by John Woo, starring Ricky Hui and Johnny Koo.

In the film, a nouveau riche millionaire is convinced that he is dying from cancer. Getting suicidal, he hires contract killers to kill him. He soon realizes that he is healthy, but he is unable to call off his own assassination. He survives the assassination attempts, but becomes unhinged during his stay in a mental hospital.

== Plot ==
After buying a winning lottery ticket worth HKD $3 million, factory workers Ah Ying and Fatso become millionaires overnight. However, a prediction by a fortune teller and a mix-up with a doctor leads Ah Ying to believe he is going to die from cancer. Not wanting to suffer, Ah Ying decides to commit suicide, but is afraid of it being painful.

While on a rooftop, he meets a poor suicidal man, whom he saves and gives HKD $20,000 of his money to pay off the latter's debts, plus another HKD $50,000 under the condition that he hires a hitman to kill him. When Ah Ying realizes he is not going to die after all, he and Fatso tries their best to call off the assassination, and has to tackle not one, but three hitmen. The ensuing chase leads all of them to a mental hospital, where they got mixed up with various mental patients in the chaos.

In the end, all the hitmen are killed and the police has arrived to deal with the chaos, but Ah Ying and Fatso have become slightly crazy as a result, with both of them starting to befriend the mental patients in the hospital.

== Cast ==
- Ricky Hui as Ah Ying
- Johnny Koo as Fatso
- JoJo Chan Kei-Kei as JoJo
- Lam Ching-ying as knife killer
