= Fung Hak-on =

Hong Kong actor

- Born: September 12, 1950; Shaxi, Zhongshan, Guangdong, China
- Died: March 2, 2016 (aged 65); Kowloon, Hong Kong
- Other name: Feng Ko An
- Occupations: Actor, action director
- Years active: 1960–2014
- Father: Fung Fung

Fung Hak-on (12 September 1948 – 2 March 2016) was a Hong Kong actor. He appeared in Hong Kong films from the 1960s to the mid-2010s.

== Career ==
In 1955, Fung became an actor in Hong Kong films. Fung first appeared in Seven Bodies, Eight Deaths and Nine Human Heads, a 1955 film directed by Fung Fung.

Fung often plays the antagonist in films. In particularly he was often cast in prominent Shaw Brothers director Chang Cheh. He would showcase his villainous roles or hired as an extra in Chang's films such as Boxer from Shantung, Five Shaolin Masters, and Disciples of Shaolin.

Following his departure from Shaw Brothers and moving to Golden Harvest company, Fung became one of the official Jackie Chan Stunt Team's second generation member all the way through the 80s, collaborating with Chan in films such as The Young Master, Dragon Lord, and Police Story.

Fung was nominated for Best Action Choreography at the 2nd Hong Kong Film Awards in 1983 for his work in Dragon Lord with co-star Jackie Chan and stunt coordinator Corey Yuen Kwai.

He portrayed Master Cheng in Ip Man 2 (2010) in his final years.

His sisters, Fung Bo-bo and Alice Fung So-bor are also actresses.

== Death ==
Fung died on 2 March 2016 from esophageal cancer.

== Selected filmography ==
- Xin ye guang bei (1962)
- Piu ling goo fung (1962)
- Ying E sha sao (1963)
- Si feng qiu huang (1969)
- Bao biao (1969)
- Vengeance (1970)
- The Heroic Ones (1970) as Warlord Zhu's soldier
- The Chinese Boxer (1970) as Chung-Yi student (uncredited)
- Xiao sha xing (1970)
- King Eagle (1971) as Lo Brothers's thug
- Xin du bi dao (1971)
- The Duel (1971) as Gan's man
- Fei xia shen dao (1971)
- Wu ming ying xiong (1971)
- Duel of Fists (1971)
- The Deadly Duo (1971)
- Lei ru fung(1971) as Guard
- Bi hu (1972)
- Boxer from Shantung (1972) as Tan Si's Coachman / Yang's thug (uncredited)
- E ke (1972)
- Shui hu zhuan (1972)
- Da sha shou (1972)
- The Delightful Forest (1972)
- Fang Shi Yu (1972) as Fang's friend
- Man of Iron (1972) as Yu Chow-Kai's thug
- Ying han (1972)
- Si qi shi (1972) as 'Hello John' waiter
- Ding tian li di (1973)
- Xiao za zhong (1973)
- Fen nu qing nian (1973) as Kung fu student / Boss Lan's Bodyguard
- Pan ni (1973)
- The Awaken Punch (1973) as Tsao Sze-hu
- Jing cha (1973)
- Man zhou ren (1973)
- Mo gui tian shi (1973)
- Xiao lao hu (1973) as Thug
- Huang Fei Hong (1973)
- Yi wang da shu (1973)
- Da dao Wang Wu (1973)
- Da zhang fu yu sao gua fu (1973)
- Zui jia bo sha (1973) as Ou San Yeh
- Hei ren wu (1973)
- Hong Xi Guan Fang Shi Yu Liu A Cai (1974) as Hsiang
- Lang bei wei jian (1974)
- Shao Lin zi di (1974)
- Ah Niu ru cheng ji (1974)
- Wu long jiao yi (1974)
- Peng you (1974)
- The Legend of the 7 Golden Vampires (1974) as Hsi Sung
- Tie han rou qing (1974)
- Shaolin Martial Arts (1974)
- Na Zha (1974)
- Wu da han (1974) as Street ruffian
- Five Shaolin Masters (1974) as Chang Chin-Chiu
- Shatter (1974) as Kung Fu Student (uncredited)
- Guai ren guai shi (1974)
- Da lao qian (1975)
- Hou sheng (1975)
- Hong quan xiao zi (1975) as Lun Ying Tu
- Big Brother Cheng (1975) as Prince Ji's man
- Lang wen (1975)
- The Fantastic Magic Baby (1975) as Erlang Shen
- Shen da (1975) as Liu Deruei's man
- Chu jia ren (1975)
- All Men Are Brothers (1975) as Rebel Officer
- Ba guo lian jun (1976) as Boxer
- Killer Clans (1976) as Roc Soc. member
- Challenge of the Masters (1976) as Yeung Chung
- Qian Long huang qi yu ji (1976)
- Dai Mung Sing (1976)
- The Magic Blade (1976) as Tao's man
- Li Xiao Long zhuan qi (1976) as Challenger to Bruce Lee on 'Enter the Dragon' Set
- Tie quan xiao zi (1977)
- Executioners from Shaolin (1977) as Governor's Henchman (uncredited)
- Qiao tan nu jiao wa (1977) as Thug
- Si da men pai (1977)
- Pai yu lao hu (1977)
- Fa qian han (1977) as Attacker
- Jue sha ling (1977)
- The Iron-Fisted Monk (1977) as Official
- Hot Blood (1977) as Cat Eye
- The Sentimental Swordsman (1977) as White Snake
- The Lonely Killer (1977)
- San shi liu mi xing quan (1977) as Tai Kuang's opponent
- Can ku da ci sha (1978)
- Mang quan guai zhao shen jing dao (1978)
- Da sha xing yu xiao mei tou (1978)
- Chuan ji Fang Shi Yu (1978)
- Nan yang tang ren jie (1978)
- Snake in the Eagle's Shadow (1978) as Master Chao Chi-Chih
- Chu zhong (1978)
- Enter the Fat Dragon (1978) as Gene
- Zhui gan pao tiao peng (1978) as Robber
- Ha luo, ye gui ren (1978)
- Gui ma gong fu (1978)
- Warriors Two (1978) as Mo
- Lao hu tian ji (1978)
- Fo Shan Zan xian sheng (1978) as Hsiao Fei
- Kung Fu vs. Yoga (1979) as Insane Drag at Brothel.
- Last Hurrah for Chivalry (1979) as Pray / Let It Be
- Magnificent Butcher (1979) as Ko Tai-hoi
- Wu zhao sheng you zhao (1979)
- Gui ying shen gong (1979)
- She xing zui bu (1980) as Yueh I
- The Young Master (1980) as Kam's Bodyguard #1
- Po jie da shi (1980) as On Yuen
- Zui she xiao zi (1980)
- Lao shu jie (1981)
- Yong zhe wu ju (1981) as Demon Tailor
- Dragon Lord (1982) as The Killer King
- Legend of a Fighter (1982) as White Man's Lackey
- Shu Shan - Xin Shu shan jian ke (1983) as Evil Disciple
- Huo pin you jian qu (1983)
- Winners and Sinners (1983) as Pat
- Wu ye lan hua (1983)
- Fei xiang guo he (1983)
- Da xiao bu liang (1984)
- Shang Hai zhi yen (1984) as Ma
- The Protector (1985) (uncredited)
- Long de xin (1985) as Restaurant patron
- Police Story (1985) as Danny Chu Ko
- Lucky Stars Go Places (1986) as Xiao Ke
- Shen tan zhu gu li (1986) as Chen Lung
- Magnificent Warriors (1987) as Japanese Agent
- Dragons Forever (1988) as Ship Thug (uncredited)
- A Bloody Fight (1988) as Fung
- Tiger Cage (1988) as Hung's buddy
- Haam ging bin yuen (1988) as Nut-Cracker
- Little Cop (1989) as Yi's henchmen
- Long zhi zheng ba (1989) as Witness
- Miracles (1989) as One of Tiger Lo's men
- Seven Warriors (1989) as Wu Long
- Just Heroes (1989) as Informant
- Chung tin siu ji (1989)
- Meng gui wu ting (1989) as Handsome
- Jui gaai chak paak dong (1990) as Parking Garage Security Chief
- Kei bing (1990)
- Dou shi sha xing (1990) as Nightclub Patron
- Lit foh ching sau (1991)
- Po jian ji xian feng (1991)
- Yan gui kuang qing (1991)
- Seong lung wui (1992)
- Handsome Siblings (1992) as Monk Blackie
- Jueh doi shuen giu (1992) as Monk Blackie
- Du wang zhi zun (1992) as Thug
- Ren sheng de yi shuai jin huan (1993) as Brother Black
- Mo lu kuang hua (1993) as Possessed Man
- Bian cheng lang zi (1993) as Siu Bee-Lei
- Sheng gang da zhui ji (1995)
- Gui ba shi (1995) as Andy
- Baan sau chuk dak hin dui (2002) as Jean Paul
- Black Mask vs. Gambling Mastermind (2002)
- Ze go ah ba zan bau za (2004)
- Kung Fu Hustle (2004) as Harpist Assassin #2
- Cocktail (2006) as Mr. Chan
- 2 Become 1 (2006) as Master Ng
- Lethal Angels (2006) as Sgt. Wai
- Yan tsoi gong wu (2007)
- Gong Tau: An Oriental Black Magic (2007) as Master Clear Water
- Triad Wars (2008) as 'Uncle' Li Chun Tong
- True Women For Sale (2008)
- Tau chut (2009)
- Rebellion (2009) as Uncle Man
- 14 Blades (2010) as Justice Escort's Counselor
- Ip Man 2 (2010) as Master Cheng
- A Chinese Ghost Story (2011) as Second Village Head
- Da er long (2011)
- Tai Chi 0 (2012) as Lao Zhao
- Ip Man: The Final Fight (2013) as Chess onlooker
- Badges of Fury (2013) as Old fighter at cafe
- Once Upon a Time in Shanghai (2014) as Scruffy Chou (final film role)
