= Raymond Chow =

Hong Kong film producer

Raymond Chow OBE GBS
- 鄒文懷
- Chow at the 5th Asian Film Awards in 2011.
- Born: Raymond Chow Man-wai; 8 October 1927; Hong Kong
- Died: 2 November 2018 (aged 91); Hong Kong SAR, China
- Education: Saint John's University, Shanghai (B.A, 1949)
- Occupation: Film producer
- Years active: 1964-2002
- Known for: Founding Orange Sky Golden Harvest
- Spouse: Felicia Yuen
- Partner: Ng Suk-fong
- Children: 3
- Relatives: Glen Chin (son-in-law)

Chinese name
- Traditional Chinese: 鄒文懷
- Simplified Chinese: 邹文怀
Transcriptions
Standard Mandarin
- Hanyu Pinyin: Zōu Wénhuái
- Wade–Giles: Tsou Wen-huai
- Yale Romanization: Dzōu Wénhuái
- IPA: [tsóʊ wə̌nxwǎɪ]
Hakka
- Romanization: Tseu^{1} Wun^{2}-fai^{2}
Yue: Cantonese
- Yale Romanization: Jáu Màhn Wàaih
- Jyutping: Zau1 Man4 Waai4
- IPA: [tsɐ́u mɐ̏nwȁːi]

Raymond Chow Man-wai OBE GBS (Chinese: 鄒文懷; 8 October 1927 – 2 November 2018) was a Hong Kong film producer and executive. He was responsible for successfully launching martial arts and the broader Hong Kong cinema onto the international stage. As the founder of Golden Harvest, he produced some of the biggest stars of the martial arts film genre, including Bruce Lee and Jackie Chan. In 2020, he was inducted into the Martial Arts History Museum Hall of Fame.

== Early life ==
Of Hakka Han ethnicity, with ancestral roots in Taipu, Guangdong, Chow studied martial arts under the Hung Ga master Lam Sai-wing. He attended Saint John's University, Shanghai, and graduated with a B.A in journalism in 1949. He started working as a reporter on the Hongkong Standard. In 1951, he joined the Voice of America office in Hong Kong.

== Career ==
Chow's film career began in 1958. He started as a publicity manager at Shaw Brothers but was soon made the head of publicity and was the head of production for 10 years until 1970. He leased Cathay's studio and contracted its exhibition chain of 104 cinema theatres in Southeast Asia. At the time Cathay was a predominant force in the Malaysian film industry.

When Cathay wanted to end the company's association in Hong Kong, Chow left Shaw Brothers to establish Golden Harvest along with producers Leonard Ho and Peter Choi in 1970. He capitalised on the shortcomings of Shaw Brothers, who had a system that limited creativity, and was able to lure Bruce Lee into Golden Harvest, making it a serious competitor to Shaw Brothers following the release of The Big Boss (1971). Chow's films with Lee became the first Hong Kong films to reach a large worldwide audience. Under Chow's leadership, Golden Harvest would become the cornerstone for Hong Kong cinema leading Hong Kong box office sales for two decades from the 1970s to 1980s as well as expanding into international distribution. In 1981, the National Association of Theatre Owners named Chow their International Showman of the Year for his contributions to the US film industry following the success of The Cannonball Run.

Whilst Chow is credited with producing many films, in the audio commentary for the UK release of Zu Warriors from the Magic Mountain, Tsui Hark was asked the elementary question of Chow's role as a film producer, explained that this credit is mostly meaningless. Tsui stated that any producer's role at the studio was often nothing more than to greenlight and ensure funding of the project, and that producers such as Chow would rarely, if ever, set foot on the set during the making of the film. Raymond Chow officially announced his retirement in Hong Kong on 5 November 2007.

== Personal life ==
Chow married Felicia Yuen Hei-wah (袁曦華) and they had a daughter Roberta Chow (鄒重珩) in 1963. Chow also had an affair with a media writer Ng Suk-fong (伍淑芳), with pen name of Lan Yan (藍茵). Ng gave birth to his illegitimate son Felix Chow (鄒重珏) in 1960, followed by a second son Terence Chow (鄒重瑾), in 1963. However Chow was unable to give Ng and their illegitimate children any legitimacy due to his marriage to Yuen, chose to separate with them but continued with financial support. Ng died of illness in 1967 and her two sons were raised by her sister.

Chow competed in international contract bridge tournaments and was a regular at the Royal Hong Kong Golf Club.

=== Death ===
Chow died in Hong Kong on 2 November 2018 at age 91 from cerebral edema. He was survived by a daughter with his late wife and two sons with his late mistress.

== Awards and nominations ==
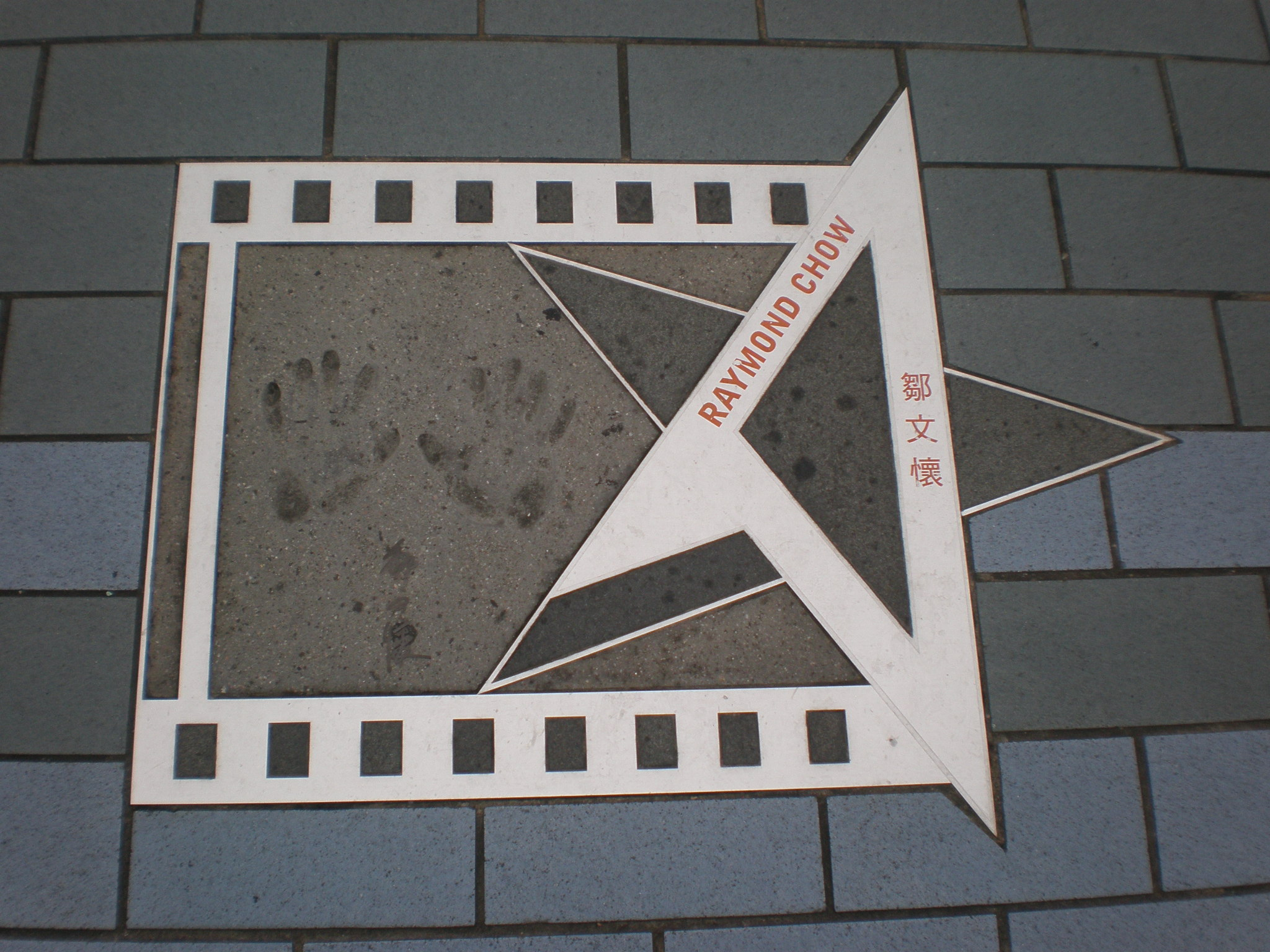
Chow's star on the Avenue of Stars, Hong Kong

| Award | Year | Category | Work | Result |
|---|---|---|---|---|
| Asian Film Award | 2011 | Lifetime Achievement | —N/a | Won |
| Hong Kong Film Award | 1983 | Best Film | The Prodigal Son | Nominated |
| Hong Kong Film Award | 1997 | Best Film | Viva Erotica | Nominated |
| Hong Kong Film Award | 2008 | Lifetime Achievement | —N/a | Won |
| Huading Award | 2013 | Lifetime Achievement | —N/a | Won |
| Tokyo International Film Festival | 2012 | Special Appreciation | —N/a | Won |

Chow has a star (No. 52) on the Avenue of Stars, Hong Kong. In 2020, he was inducted into the Martial Arts History Museum Hall of Fame.

Order of precedence
| Preceded by John Estmond Strickland; Recipients of the Gold Bauhinia Star | Hong Kong order of precedence Recipients of the Gold Bauhinia Star | Succeeded by Cheng Hon-kwan; Recipients of the Gold Bauhinia Star |
