= List of Hong Kong films of 1975 =

A list of films produced in Hong Kong in 1975:

== 1975 ==
| Title | Director | Cast | Genre | Notes |
|---|---|---|---|---|
1975
| 18 Shaolin Disciples | | | | |
| 24 Hours Romance | | | | |
| All in the Family | Zhu Mu | Jackie Chan | Comedy | Cited as a porn film |
| All Men Are Brothers | Chang Cheh, Wu Ma | | | |
| All Mixed Up | Ho Meng Hua | | | |
| Anti-Corruption | Ng See Yuen | | | |
| The Association | Jeong Chang-hwa | | | |
| Bald-Headed Betty | Cheung Sam | | | |
| Bar Girl | Cheung Chang Chak | | | |
| The Bedevilled | Lo Wei | | | |
| Big Brother Cheng | Kuei Chih Hung | Chen Kuan-tai | | |
| The Big Hold Up | Chu Yuan | | | |
| Black Alice | Ting Shan-hsi | | | |
| Black Dragon | Kim Seon Kyeong | | | |
| The Black Dragon's Revenge | Tony Liu | | | |
| Black Magic | Ho Meng Hua | Ti Lung, Lo Lieh | | |
| Blood And Rose | | | | |
| Blood Promise (film) | | | | |
| The Bloody Escape | Sun Chung | | | |
| Bons Baisers de Hong Kong | Yvan Chiffre | | | |
| Born of Fire | Ulysses Au-Yeung Jun | | | |
| Boxer's Last Stand | | | | |
| Bravest One | Faan Daan | | | |
| Bruce Lee Against Supermen | Wu Chia Chun | | | |
| Carry On Con Men | Wong Fung | Cheung Ying, Terry Lau Wai-Yue, Teresa Ha Ping, Anna Ng Yuen-Yee, Mi Lan, Nancy Liang Lan-Si, Gam Lau, Yuk-Yi Yung | Comedy | |
| Cheung Po Chai | Gwaan Jing Leung | | | |
| Chinese Amazons | Lee Ga | | | |
| Chinese Dragon | Chang Yi | | | |
| Chinese Superior Kung Fu | | | | |
| Cohabitation | Sun Chung | | | |
| Confession of a Concubine | Florence Yu Fung Chi | | | |
| Conspiracy of Thieves | Larry Tu Chong Hsun | | | |
| A Cookbook of Birth Control | Steve Chan Ho | | | |
| The Crazy Guy | | | | |
| Cuties Parade | Poon Lui | | | |
| The Death Player | Kong Ban | | | |
| A Debt of Crime | Chan Chun | | | |
| Deep Autumn Love | | | | |
| Desperate Avenger | Chan Hung Man | | | |
| Disciples of Shaolin | Chang Cheh | | | |
| Don't Call Me Uncle | Richard Yeung Kuen | | | |
| Dragon Gate | Ulysses Au-Yeung Jun | | | |
| Dragon Kid | San Kong | | | |
| Dragon Tamers | John Woo | | | |
| Eight Hundred Heroes | | | | |
| The Empress Dowager | Li Han Hsiang | | | |
| Enjoy Longevity 300 Years | Richard Yeung Kuen | | | |
| Evergreen Tree | | | | |
| Family In Thousands | Woo Siu Fung | | | |
| Fantasies Behind The Pearly Curtain | Pai Ching Jui | | | |
| The Fantastic Magic Baby | Chang Cheh | | | |
| Fearful Interlude | Kuei Chih Hung | | | |
| Female Chivalry | Yeung Jing Chan | | | |
| Female Fugitive | Kao Pao-shu | | | |
| Fertility Bank | Steve Chan Ho | | | |
| Fierce Among Strong | Yeung Yee Muk | | | |
| The Fighting Dragon | | | | |
| Filial Son | | | | |
| Fists of Dragons | Yen Yung Tsu | | | |
| The Floating Clouds | | | | |
| The Flying Guillotine | Ho Meng Hua | | | |
| Forbidden Tales of Two Cities | Li Han Hsiang | | | |
| Frigidity | Kenneth Tsang | | | |
| Gambling For Head | | | | |
| Gambling Syndicate | Cheung Chang Chak | | | |
| The Gangster Match-Maker | Suen Sing Yuen | | | |
| The Girl With The Dexterous Touch | | | | |
| Girl With The Long Hair | Ho Fan | | | |
| Girl's Diary | Lui Kei | Ai Ti, Lam Yi-Wa, Ofelia Yau Wai, Lee Fung-Lan, Nancy Liang Lan-Si, Tong Si, Ginny | | |
| The Golden Lion | Ho Meng Hua | | | |
| Golden Needles | | | | |
| Goodbye Bruce Lee | Lin Bing | | | |
| The Great Hunter | | | | |
| The Happy Trio | John Law | | | |
| A Haunted House | Ng See Yuen | | | |
| He Loved Once Too Many | | | | |
| Heroes Behind The Enemy Lines | | | | |
| Heroine | Yeung Jing Chan | | | |
| The Holocaust | Cheung Mei Gwan | | | |
| Honeymoon Killer | Lau Wai Ban | | | |
| Hong Kong Superman | Ting Shan-hsi | | | |
| The Hooker and the Hustler | Lui Kei | | | |
| Hot Wave | Man Sek Ling | | | |
| The Imposter | Pao Hsueh Lieh | | | |
| Invitation From Hell | | | | |
| Iron Man | Cheung Yat Woo | | | |
| It's All In The Family | Law Chun | | | |
| Kill the Ninja | | | | |
| Kill the Shogun | | | | |
| Kissed by the Wolves | Chan Hung-lit | Alan Tang, Angela Pan, Dean Shek, Lydia Shum, Chan Hung-lit | Adult | |
| Kun Pi | Rome Bunnag | | | |
| Kung Fu Stars | Law Kei | | | |
| Lady of the Law | San Kong | | | |
| Land of the Undaunted | | | | |
| The Last Message | Michael Hui | Michael Hui, Samuel Hui, Ricky Hui, James Tien, Roy Chiao, Dean Shek, Joseph Koo | Comedy | |
| Laugh In The Sleeve | Lee Tit | | | |
| The Legend of Mother Goddess | Hau Chang | | | |
| The Life God | | | | |
| Little Sister In Law | Yeung Siu | | | |
| Little Super Man | Ng See Yuen | | | |
| Love Story of Pian Pian | | | | |
| Lover's Destiny | Chu Yuan | | | |
| The Monk | Dean Shek | Dean Shek | Martial arts | |
| No End of Surprises | Chu Mu | Tien Lie, Siu Yam-Yam, Jackie Chan, Cheng Siu-Ping, Rainbow Ching Ho-Wai, Wang Lai, Lam Yi-Wa, Leung Shun-Yin, Chan Lai-Lai, Christina Hsia, Angelina Lo Yuen-Yan, Anna Ng Yuen-Yee, Fong Yue, Got Ping | Comedy | |
