= List of Taiwanese films before 1970 =

This is a list of films produced in Taiwan ordered by year of release.

== 1922 ==
Title	Director	Cast	Genre	Notes
The Eyes of Buddha				

== 1925 ==
Title	Director	Cast	Genre	Notes
Whose Fault It Is				

== 1965 ==
Title	Director	Cast	Genre	Notes
Beautiful Duckling	Hsing Lee			
The Silent Wife	Hsing Lee			

== 1966 ==
Title	Director	Cast	Genre	Notes
Wo nu ruo lan				

== 1967 ==
Title	Director	Cast	Genre	Notes
Dragon Inn	King Hu	Shih Chun, Shang-Kuan Ling-feng, Bai Ying	Wuxia	

== 1968 ==
Title	Director	Cast	Genre	Notes
The Swordsman of All Swordsmen	Joseph Kuo	Shang-guan Ling-feng, Tien Peng, Yang Meng-hua	Wuxia	
