= Consort Shu =

Consort Shu may refer to:

- Consort Shu (Qianlong) (1728–1777), concubine of the Qianlong Emperor
- Consort Shu (Jiaqiang) (died 1792), concubine of the Jiaqing Emperor
- Wenxiu (1909–1953), consort of Puyi
