= Ouyang Sha-fei =

Chinese actress

- 錢舜英
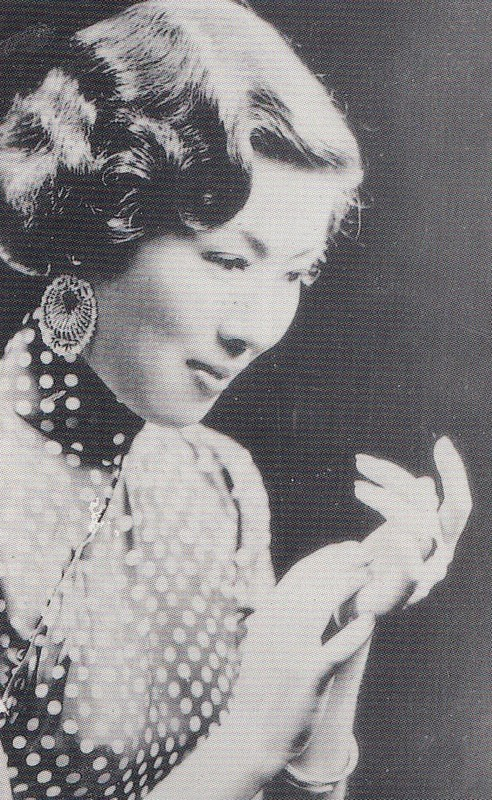
- Ouyang in the 1940s
- Born: 9 September 1924; Suzhou, Jiangsu, China
- Died: 5 August 2010 (aged 85); Salt Lake City, Utah, U.S.
- Years active: 1943–1991 (film)
- Spouse: Tu Guangqi

Qian Shunying (Chinese: 錢舜英; Wade–Giles: Chien Shun-ying; September 9, 1924 – March 8, 2010), better known by her stage name Ouyang Sha-fei (traditional Chinese: 歐陽莎菲; simplified Chinese: 欧阳莎菲; Jyutping: Auyeung Sa-fay), was a Hong Kong actress.

She is known for her roles in Dragon Fist (1979), A Chinese Ghost Story II (1990), and Dream of the Red Chamber (1977).

== Early life ==
Ouyang was born in Suzhou, Jiangsu, Republic of China on September 9, 1924.

== Acting career ==
Ouyang was prolific actress; she famously starred in over 250 films in a 54-year period, between 1937 and 1991. At the age of 17, she began her acting career in several Mandarin movies in Shanghai. "Spy Number One" (1946) was her first successful movie. Ouyang made 17 films between 1951 and 1952, making her one of the busiest actresses in the Hong Kong film industry in her time. For most of the movies in her early career, she collaborated with her director and husband, Tu Guangqi. This partnership lasted until 1956.

In the early 1960s, Ouyang signed with the Shaw Brothers Studio. She exclusively acted in their films until the late 1970s. As her career matured in the late 1970s, Ouyang primarily took on roles of the mother or aunt in films and received two awards as the Best Supporting Role. While in Taiwan, she collaborated primarily with local Taiwanese TV networks. After returning to Hong Kong, she made cameos in many TV shows and movies and finally retired in 1990.

== Personal life ==
As Ouyang's acting career took off in the 1940s, she married her director, Tu Guangqi (Doo Kwang Gee). Her marriage was well-known after World War II. In the 1950s, the married couple escaped to Hong Kong to escape the political turmoil in China. They separated in 1956 and were divorced. from their 10 years of marriage, they had three daughters, eldest 屠燕英, second 屠繼美, and the youngest 屠燕芸 Anita Doo (Nita Doo).

In 1979, she remarried Tu and relocated to the United States. When her spouse died the next year, she relocated to Taiwan. Ouyang later returned to Hong Kong.

After retiring in 1990, Ouyang relocated to the U.S. for a few years and experienced a bad fall in 2009. Her health declined until she died of organ failure on August 5, 2010 and was buried in Salt Lake City, Utah.

== Filmography ==
=== Film ===
Ouyang starred in over 250 films.

Year	Title	Role	Notes
1943	Swallows Welcome Spring		
1943	Qiu Qi Ge		
1944	Kai Feng		
1945	Dream of the Red Chamber	Xi Ren	
1945	The Grand Hotel		
1945	Struggle		
1946	Spy Number One		
1948	Murderer Among the Sisters		
1948	The Broken Dream		
1948	Missing Document		
1949	Female Prisoner No. 13	Fenglian Shi	
1949	Reformed Lady		
1949	The Bell-Ring in the Hanshan Temple		
1950	Miss Du Jin		
1951	The Open Road	Zhilan	
1951	Modern Girl		
1951	The Thirteen Grand Tutors		Also known as The Thirteen That Go Astray
1951	Modern Wives		
1951	Missing Document		
1952	A Double-Faced Man	Yulan Xie	
1952	The Troubled Love of Wang Kui and Gui Ying		
1952	Don't Tell My Husband		
1952	Portrait of a Lady		
1952	The Closer the Better		
1952	Bloodbath		
1952	Angelo		
1952	Beautiful Corpse in the Bath		
1952	Modern Red Chamber Dream	Baochai Xue	
1952	A Woman's Heart		
1952	Demon of Lust		
1952	Fatal Attraction		
1952	A Woman's Stifled Desires		
1952	The World Turned Upside Down		
1952	Gone to the Dogs		
1953	New West Chamber		
1953	Beauty in Disguise		
1953	Little Couple		
1953	A Woman's Love		
1953	The Magic World of Filmdom		
1953	The Illegitimate Son	Fang Ah	
1953	Do Not Forget Tonight		
1954	Love's Longing		
1956	Love's Elegy		
1956	The Flame of Love		
1957	Little Angels of the Streets		
1958	Return of the Prodigal Youth		
1958	Dawn of New Hopes		
1959	All in the Family	Du's mother	
1959	Girl with a Thousand Guises		
1959	Mischievous Girl		
1959	Orphans of the Storm		
1960	Death Traps	Rose Huang Meigui	
1960	Secret Affairs		
1960	Swindler's Delight		
1960	Filial Piety	Madam Wong	
1960	The Lady Musketeer		
1960	Let the Young Decide		
1960	The Wild, Wild Rose	Liang's mother	
1960	Tragic Melody	Xiufeng Hua	
1960	Devotion	Mrs. Shi	
1961	Sun, Moon and Star (Part 1)	Jianbai's grandmother	
1961	The Search of Loved One	Aunt Wong	
1961	Venture of the Lady Musketeer		
1962	Lily of the Valley	Mrs. Hu	
1962	A Gratitude as Weighty as the Mountain		
1962	Tears of a Lute Player		
1962	7 Playful Women		
1962	Shan Dong Ma Yong Zhen	Jingwen Xu	
1963	The Love Eterne	Shanbo's mother	
1963	The Lady and the Thief		
1963	The Adulteress	Shouying Yang	
1963	Stepmother	Shuhua Huang	
1963	The Second Spring		
1964	Beyond the Great Wall	Chun's runaway maid	
1964	The Warlord and the Actress	one of General's wives	
1964	The Dancing Millionnairess	Yue's aunt	
1964	The Shepherd Girl	Widow Zhu	
1964	The Coin	Ma Chen	
1964	The Story of Sue San	Lung's elder sister	
1964	Between Tears and Smiles	Yuechin Huang	
1964	Comedy of Mismatches	Yulang's mother	
1965	Call of the Sea	Chinhu's mother	
1965	The Mermaid	Prime Minister's wife	
1965	Pink Tears	Ping's mother	
1965	Squadron 77	Kyoko	
1965	Inside the Forbidden City	Concubine Chengfei Li	
1966	'Til the End of Time	Hsuehling's grandmother	
1966	The Treacherous Lady Killer		
1966	The Blue and the Black (Part 1)	Madame Kao	
1966	The Blue and the Black (Part 2)	Madame Kao	
1966	Sweet and Wild	Mrs. Tang	
1966	The Joy of Spring		
1966	The Mating Season	Secretary	
1966	The Bridge		
1967	The King With My Face	Empress Wei	
1967	Hong Kong Nocturne	Tze Ching's Mother	
1967	Sweet is Revenge	David's mother	
1967	Swan Song	Mrs. Ge	
1967	Too Late for Love	Mrs. Li	
1967	The Goddess of Mercy	Princess Miaoyin	
1967	The Mirror and the Lichee	Madam Huang	
1967	The Midnight Murder	Liu's mother	
1967	Madam Slender Plum	David's mother	
1967	Four Sisters	Grandma	
1968	The Sword of Swords	Old Madam	
1968	Mist Over Dream Lake	Shunchuan Hsu	
1968	When the Clouds Roll By	Mrs. Qiu	
1968	That Fiery Girl	Chilli's Nanny	
1968	Double Trouble	Director's wife	
1968	The Rainbow	Chiumeng Shen	
1968	Forever and Ever	Xiaowen's mother	
1969	Unfinished Melody	Aunty Zhang	
1969	Torrent of Desire	Madame Chen	
1969	Dear Murderer (1969 film)	Mrs. Yeh	
1969	Killers Five	Yue's mother	
1969	Temptress of a Thousand Faces	Newspaper manager	
1969	Raw Courage	Mrs. Bai	
1969	Tropicana Interlude	Jiang Ren's mother	
1970	Double Bliss	Mrs. Zhou (Mrs. Chu)	
1970	Whose Baby's in the Classroom?	Head Mistress	
1970	Apartment for Ladies	Mrs. Chan	
1970	Love Song Over the Sea		
1970	A Place to Call Home	Mrs. Yukwa Jang	
1971	Lady with a Sword	Feifei's mother	
1971	The Long Years		
1971	The Man with Two Wives		
1971	The Swift Knight	Sister Yu	
1971	Sunset	Julie Hu	
1971	The Eunuch	Kun Erh	
1972	The Fugitive	Bank customer with jade bracelet	
1972	The Lizard	Japanese ambassador's wife	
1972	Of Wives and Mistresses		
1972	Let's Go to Bed		
1972	The Merry Wife	Ms. Xia	
1972	The 14 Amazons	Chunchu Chai	
1972	Finger of Doom	Leader of Finger of Doom clan	
1973	The Bastard	Brothel madam	
1973	Tales of Larceny	Blind beggar	
1973	Facets of Love	Mother	
1973	The School Mistress		
1973	The House of 72 Tenants	Mrs. Chan	
1973	River of Fury	Yiqing Ge's mother	
1974	Hong Kong 73	Dorkei Wong's wife	
1974	Sorrow of the Gentry	Ma Zhang	
1974	The Splendid Love in Winter	Mimi's mother	
1974	Supremo	Mrs. Erhwen Tu	
1974	The Playboy		
1974	The Emerald Horse		
1974	Cheeky Little Angels	Grandmother	
1974	Blood Reincarnation	Dr. Liu's maid Suihong	
1974	The Rat Catcher	Mrs. Fang	
1974	Sex, Love and Hate	Li Ji's mother	
1974	One Year's Fantasy	Wang's mother	
1974	Farewell Dearest		
1974	Gossip Street	Aunt Chau	
1975	Black Alice		
1975	Lover's Destiny	Fengshian's mother	
1975	Sup Sap Bup Dup	False moustache's wife	
1975	The Miserable Girl		
1975	The Nutty Crook		
1975	The Bloody Escape	Tang Li's mother	
1975	Cuties Parade		
1975	Lady of the Law	Madam White Brows	
1975	Love Lock		
1975	Temperament of Life	Manager's wife	
1975	The Big Holdup	Inspector's mother	
1975	The Empress Dowager	Concubine	
1975	Bald-Headed Betty		
1975	Hong Kong Superman		
1975	The Bedevilled	Chia Chu's mother	
1975	All in the Family	Ling's mother	
1975	Enjoy Longevity-300 Years		
1975	Moon and Stars		
1975	Maids-in-Waiting		
1975	Kissed by the Wolves		
1975	Shantung Man in Hong Kong		
1975	Gambling Syndicate	Casino guest	
1975	Mutiny on the High Sea		
1975	Bar Girl		
1975	My Wacky, Wacky World	Brothel boss	
1976	Love Swindler	Xiaolin's mother	
1976	King Gambler	Mrs. Shaqian Li	
1976	The Web of Death	Major clan senior	
1976	The Dragon Missile	Long's mother	
1976	The Big Family	Mother Lung	
1976	Wrong Side of the Track	Aunt Liu	
1976	Hustler from Canton		
1976	Born Rich		
1976	My Funny Intern		
1976	The Forbidden Past	Mrs. Zhu	
1976	Crossroad	Fang's mom	
1976	The Last Tempest	Prince Duan's wife	
1976	The Fierce Fist	Sher's mother	
1976	The Morning Date		
1976	The Prodigal Son		
1977	The Diary of Di-Di		
1977	He Has Nothing But Kung Fu		
1977	Starlets for Sale	Mrs. Zhang	
1977	The Battle Wizard		only in deleted footage
1977	Death Duel	Hsiao Li's mother	
1977	The Flash Legs	Chang Fang's mother	
1977	Cloud of Romance	Wanlu's adoptive mother	
1977	The Fatal Flying Guillotines	Shen Ping's mother	
1977	Golden Nun		
1977	The Mad Monk	Qin's wife	
1977	Pursuit of Vengeance	Le Yin	
1977	Dreams of Eroticism	Siqi's mother	
1977	The Dream of the Red Chamber	Mrs. Jia Zheng	
1977	Forever and Ever	Prisoner's mother	
1977	Hong Kong Emmanuelle	An Liang's mother	
1977	Orchid in the Rain		
1977	Judgement of an Assassin	Chief Jin Te Tien's wife	
1978	The Avenging Eagle	Se Ma Sun's wife	
1978	Heroes of the East	Third Aunt	
1978	Interlude on Rails		
1978	Clan of Amazons	Mrs. Xue	
1978	Three Minutes Past Nine	Shen Yan's grandmother	
1978	Duel at Tiger Village	Lee San's mother	cameo
1978	Delinquent Teenagers		
1978	The Cunning Hustler		
1979	Lewd Lizard		
1979	The Last Judgement	Mother Liang	
1979	Invincible Enforcer	Ah Fatt's wife	
1979	Young Lovers	Mrs. Fang	
1979	Dragon Fist	Master Zhuang's wife	
1979	Spiritual Boxer, Part II	Mother of missing vampire	
1979	Spring in the Palace		
1980	The Undated Wedding		
1980	Haunted Tales	Yali's mother	
1981	Sha Jia Shi Wu Nu Ying Hao		
1981	The Women Soldiers		
1981	Kung Fu From Beyond the Grave	Chun Sing's mother	
1982	In Out Time		
1982	Strange Skill		
1982	The Persistently Devoted Son		
1982	The Devil Fox		
1982	Devil Returns		
1982	Godfathers of Fury		
1983	The Enchantress	Jiao's Japanese maid	
1983	Take Care, Your Majesty!	Royal teacher	
1983	Seeding of a Ghost	Guest at Fong's home	
1983	Devil Fetus	Grandmother Cheung	
1983	Calamity of Snakes		
1984	Law with Two Phases	Chief B's mother	
1984	Prince Charming	Lipin Chen's mother	
1984	My Sentimental Little Friend	Lora	
1985	Why Me?	Koko's grandmother	
1988	Fatal Love	San	
1988	Flirting		
1990	The Fun, the Luck & the Tycoon	Sun's aunt	
1990	A Chinese Ghost Story II		
1990	Rebel from China	Meiling's grandmother	
1991	The Gambling Ghost	Triad mum playing mahjong at wedding	
