= Female Fugitive =

Female Fugitive may refer to:

- Female Fugitive (1938 film), American crime romance
- Female Fugitive (1975 film), Hong Kong crime action, original title Nu tao fan
