= War and Beauty =

Hong Kong television period drama serial

- Official poster
- War and Beauty 金枝慾孽
- Genre: Period drama Costume drama
- Starring: Sheren Tang; Maggie Cheung; Charmaine Sheh; Bowie Lam; Moses Chan; Gigi Lai
- Opening theme: Sons and Daughters (兒女) by Bowie Lam
- Ending theme: Arsenic (砒霜) by Bowie Lam and Gigi Lai
- Country of origin: Hong Kong
- Original languages: Cantonese; Mandarin
- No. of episodes: 30

Production
- Running time: 45 minutes (each)
- Production company: TVB

Original release
- Network: TVB Jade
- Release: 23 August – 2 October 2004

Related
- To Catch the Uncatchable; Split Second; Beauty at War (2013)

War and Beauty
- Traditional Chinese: 金枝慾孽
Transcriptions
Standard Mandarin
- Hanyu Pinyin: Jīn Zhī Yù Niè
Yue: Cantonese
- Jyutping: Gam1 Zi1 Juk6 Jip6

War and Beauty (Chinese: 金枝慾孽) is a Hong Kong television period drama serial that originally aired on TVB Jade from 23 August to 2 October 2004, consisting of 30 episodes. It stars TVB Best Actress winners Sheren Tang (2009/2010), Maggie Cheung (2003), Charmaine Sheh (2006/2014/2024), and Gigi Lai (2004 - she won the award for her work in this drama). It also stars TVB Best Actor winners Bowie Lam (2004 - he also won the award for his work in this drama) and Moses Chan (2007). It received widespread praise among critics and audiences for its acting and plot. It continues to remain one of the most popular TVB dramas and is often referenced as the first drama series that sparked the popularity for palace scheming dramas in Hong Kong such as Beyond the Realm of Conscience and Mainland Chinese dramas including Empresses in the Palace, Story of Yanxi Palace and Ruyi's Royal Love in the Palace. In 2022, the drama was selected as one of ten classic TVB dramas being honoured for a new joint Youku and TVB programme. In 2022, Tang, Cheung, and Sheh reprised their roles for the Zhejiang Television, Youku, and TVB-produced variety show Memories Beyond Horizon.

== Synopsis ==
This show was set in the Forbidden City, in Qing dynasty China in the late years of the Jiaqing Emperor's rule. It focused on the power struggle between various royal concubines trying to secure the Emperor's favor, with corruption, intrigue and outright deceit being the weapons of choice. These women were willing to manipulate, betray and even kill just about anyone in order to get what they wanted.

Throughout the later parts of the series, the inevitable results of this corruption become increasingly apparent. The main characters start to lose everything they care for, while being forced to conclude that they have only themselves to blame. In the meantime, corruption takes its toll on the outside world as well: the entire empire is destabilizing.

=== Ending ===
At the end of the series, many things come to a head. As the corruption of Qing politics became all the more prevalent, the people of the country organize an armed rebellion. The rebellion was led by Hung-Mo's fraternal brother, Chen Shuang, who felt wronged during his time in the Palace and is seeking revenge. The rebel invasion of the Palace opened up some interesting opportunities, especially for the Empress, who tried to kill off her opposition and blame it on the rebels.

Sun Bak-Yeung made an attempt to use the situation to escape with Yi-Sun and Yuk-Ying. However, Yuk-Ying refusing to give up power, was unwilling to go with them, and Sun Bak-Yeung makes Hung-Mo promise that he will take Yi-Sun out of the Forbidden Palace. Despite Yi-Sun's pleas, Sun Bak-yeung heads for Yuk-Ying's residence to confront her. While the two were in Yuk-Ying's residence, the Empress' guards boards up the entrances and sets it on fire, causing both to be burned alive together. Sun Bak-Yeung's father, Sun Ching-wah, finds out about his son's death when a raven carrying his son's jade band drops it right in front of him as he waited for his son.

On-Seen, whose plan to exact revenge on the Empress for her grandmother's death was scuppered, hatched plans to leave the Palace with Hung-Mo and Yi-Sun, who had lost all will to live in the Palace after her adoptive father, Tsui Man-tin, died. At the same time, Yu-Yuet was also invited to leave but realizing she can no longer live a normal civilian life since she entered the Palace at the age of 16, she chooses to stay. Having survived an attack by several guards dressed up as rebels and having realized the true fate of Sun Bak-Yeung and Yuk-Ying, she confronts the Empress directly at her residence and vows take her down.

As the trio leaves the palace, On-seen was seen shot by a stray arrow. She dies on Hung-Mo's shoulder without him being aware while escaping in a horse cart. In the end, only Hung-Mo and Yi-Sun successfully leave the palace as Yu-Yuet looks on from the palace.

== Cast ==
Note: Some of the characters' names are in Cantonese romanisation.

Royal harem
Cast	Role	Description
Yu Yang	Aisin-Gioro Yong Yan 愛新覺羅·顒琰,皇上	The Jiaqing Emperor.
Rebecca Chan	Empress Niuhuru 鈕祜祿氏,皇后	Empress Xiaoherui. She was initially out of favour, but regained it after winning a power struggle with Yu-Yuet. (Main Villain)
Sheren Tang	Niuhuru Yu-Yuet 鈕祜祿·如玥,如妃	Imperial Consort Yu. An initially favoured concubine who eventually fell out of favour with the Emperor after losing a power struggle with the Empress. She was originally seen for her rather bullying demeanours in early episodes after the Empress causes her miscarriage prior to the events of the series.
Maggie Cheung Ho Yee	Suwanniguwalgiya On-Seen 蘇完尼瓜爾佳·安茜,安貴人	Noble Lady On; Loves Hung Mo A palace maid who cared for Yuk-ying but after knowing that her grandmother was killed by the Empress, she actively gains the Emperor's favor to take revenge. She later becomes a Noble Lady to which Yuk-ying sees as a betrayal and tries to act revenge. Died in episode 30
Gigi Lai	Hougiya Yuk-ying 侯佳·玉瑩,華貴人	Noble Lady Wah; Loves Sun Bak-yeung; Yi-Sun's enemy Yuk-Ying was treated quite badly by her father before entering the palace. Her mother is the fourth (and neglected) concubine of her father. Unlike the other consorts, she refuses to give up power in the end, which ultimately leads to her demise. Died in episode 30
Charmaine Sheh	Donggiya Yi-Sun 董佳·爾淳,淳貴人	Noble Lady Shun; Loves Sun Bak-yeung; Yuk-Ying's enemy A Han Chinese posing as a Manchurian in order to get into the palace, she was trained since her youth to gain the Emperor's favor and save her adoptive father (who committed treason) from death.
Jade Leung	Nalan Fuk Nga 納蘭·福雅,福貴人	Noble Lady Fook; A kind concubine in the Imperial Court who fell out of favour because of her illness. She is the biological sister to Concubine Chun. Towards the end, it is revealed that she had been poisoning herself, sacrificing her future so that Sun Bak Yeung would continually treat her. Died in episode 29.

Other major characters
Cast	Role	Description
Bowie Lam	Suen Bak-Yeung 孫白颺	Imperial Doctor Suen; Loves Yuk-Ying; A palace doctor who caters to the needs of all concubines. He was romantically involved with Yuk-Ying, who bore his child and posed it as the Emperor's child. Died in episode 30
Moses Chan	Hung Mo 孔武	Loves On-Seen; A palace guard who gained the favour of the Emperor after saving his life. Was responsible for the safety of Yi-Sun and Yuk-Ying on their way to Beijing.
Chan Hung Lit	Suen Ching Wah 孫清華	Father of Sun Bak-Yeung. He and his son share a rather cold relationship, with his disapproval of his son's actions within the Inner Harem of the Palace.
Lo Hoi Pang	Tsui Man-tin 徐萬田	He is the master behind the plot to train Yi-sun to become a formidable, beautiful woman and sent her into the Palace to actively gain the favour of the Emperor for the sake of his own life. He was murdered by his wife near the end of the series.
Wai Kar Hung	Chan Song 陳爽	Fraternal brother of Hung Mo. He was expelled from the Palace after he was caught stealing and was discovered to have joined the rebel forces at the end of the series when they attacked the Palace. Died at the end of the series defending his fraternal brother.
Ngo Ka-nin	Wong Fuk-sau 汪福壽	Eunuch Works for the Empress in taking down Yu-Yuet and others.

== Popularity and reception ==
=== Themes ===
Amongst Hong Kong's office workers, the feuding and shifting alliances of the Imperial women, with greater issues being sacrificed for personal piques and gains was taken as a metaphor for the office politics familiar to many. The exploits of their characters were followed in minute detail in online forums, with each betrayal or stab in the back leading to flaming, denunciations, accusations and denials amongst the rival factions.

However, this is just a narrow interpretation of the themes present in the serial. In a broader sense, the theme of the serial, especially apparent toward the end, is that of oppressed femininity under the feudal hierarchy. For example, a plot line involves Hung-Mo finding a silk handkerchief with a poem embroidered on it. That poem, expressing the frustration of being trapped in the Forbidden City and the longing for life outside the palace, is later revealed to be written by Consort Yu. Even though Consort Yu has been originally characterized as power-thirsty and ruthless, the audience sees into her deeper, more sincere sentiments. The fact that she eventually chooses to stay behind in the palace trapping herself into a tragic fate, shows the extent the Forbidden City, the epitome of the rigorous Chinese feudal system, which shackles the women that live within it.

There are many preconceptions and even myths about a place as exclusive as the Forbidden City. The women in the serial are just behaving as such—cunning, cruel, betraying—in order to survive in addition to securing their imperial status. Feminine roles in feudal times are restricted, and they are even more so on the pinnacle of Chinese feudal hierarchy which is the Forbidden City. Audiences and critics noted that all the characters were well-developed and none were pure good or evil, which was different and refreshing for TVB drama series. The series overall sparked an overwhelming response from audiences. It created an incredibly high rating, peaking at 44 points, just below War of the Genders.

=== Response and Viewership ===
The show was not without its critics. Some sociologists, psychologists, and academics criticized the show as promoting hatred due to its consistent scheming plot and backstabbing as a "natural" matter, and fears that the drama will twist the youth's perception of social relationships in general. When one such psychologist was asked about his views concerning the series, he stated "I think we must remind ourselves that even if the intentions of this [War and Beauty] are represented as merely fictitious harm, we should still focus on this harm nonetheless, especially when it's in respect to our youth". However, many ordinary citizens simply believe the show was a reflection of the real world. The creators and fans alike denied such existence of 'harm', and that there are no such subliminal connotations behind the series.

Time Out Hong Kong named War and Beauty among the best 17 Hong Kong television dramas of all time.

== Awards and nominations ==
=== TVB Anniversary Awards (2004) ===
Best Drama Award

My Favorite Actor in a Leading Role award went to Bowie Lam for his role as Suen Bak Yeung

My Favorite Actress in a Leading Role award went to Gigi Lai for her role as Yuk Ying

My Favorite Powerhouse Actress Award went to Sheren Tang for her role as Yu Yuet.

My Favorite Powerhouse Actor award went to Chan Hung Lit for his role as Suen Ching Wah.

My Favorite Television Character Award went to Sheren Tang, Bowie Lam, Charmaine Sheh, Moses Chan, Gigi Lai for their roles.

This drama is considered the best drama in TVB production in year 2004.

This drama also won the Most Favourite Drama in Astro Wah Lai Toi Drama Awards 2005.

Sheh won the Most Favourite Actress in Astro Wah Lai Toi Drama Awards 2005.

After Sheren Tang won the TVB Best Actress award in 2009 and 2010, War and Beauty became the TVB drama with the most Best Actress winners. Other TVB Best Actress winners in the series are Maggie Cheung Ho-Yee, Gigi Lai, and Charmaine Sheh who won their respective Best Actress awards in 2003, 2004 and 2006 (and in 2014, second time win for Charmaine Sheh).

== Home video releases ==
DVD cover.

War and Beauty was released on DVD and VCD a few months after its finale, and was a bestseller. It also became the first TVB drama to receive a DVD release, albeit a limited one. The DVD box was made of shiny gold cloth, with the drama's title woven on it with gold thread.

== See also ==
- Corruption
- Forbidden City
- Ranks of Imperial Consorts in China
- Harem
- Beyond the Realm of Conscience
- Dae Jang Geum
- The Queen of All
