= Bedevilled =

Bedevil, Bedeviled, Bedevilled or The Bedevilled may refer to:

== Film ==
- Bedevilled (1955 film), American crime drama by Mitchell Leisen
- Fear No Evil (1969 film) (also known as Bedevilled), 1969 American TV film by Paul Wendkos
- The Bedevilled (film), 1974 Hong Kong horror film by Lo Wei
- Bedevil, 1993 Australian horror film by Tracey Moffatt
- Bedevilled (2010 film), South Korean horror/thriller by Jang Cheol-soo
- Bedeviled (2016 film), American supernatural horror film

== Literature ==
- Bedeviled, 2009 novel by American romance novelist Maureen Child

== See also ==
- The Bee-Deviled Bruin, 1949 American short animated film under the Looney Tunes banner
- Bedevilled Rabbit, 1957 American short animated film starring Bugs Bunny
- "The Case of the Bedeviled Doctor", 1959 episode of the second season of the American TV series Perry Mason
