= Can Dialectics Break Bricks? =

La dialectique peut-elle casser des briques ?
- Movie poster
- Directed by: René Viénet
- Starring: Jason Pai Piao; Chen Hung-Lieh
- Release date: 1973
- Running time: 90 minutes
- Country: France
- Language: French

Can Dialectics Break Bricks? (French: La dialectique peut-elle casser des briques?) is a 1973 Situationist film produced by the French director René Viénet which explores the development of class conflict through revolutionary agitation against a backdrop of graphic kung-fu fighting.

== Production and intention ==
The film utilizes footage from the 1972 martial arts film Crush by Tu Guangqi, which tells the story of anti-colonialist revolt in occupied Korea, which was dubbed over by the filmmakers in an example of détournement. Viénet's intention was to adapt a "spectacular" film typical of the film industry to the purposes of a radical critique of cultural hegemony and thus an expression of subversive revolutionary ideals.

== Plot ==
The narrative focuses on a conflict between proletarians and bureaucrats within state capitalism. The proletarians enlist their grasp of dialectics in the fight against their oppressors, while the bureaucrats defend themselves using a combination of co-optation and violence.

The film also contains numerous references to socialists, including Karl Marx, Bakunin, and Wilhelm Reich, as well as scathing criticism directed toward the French Communist Party, trade unionism and Maoism. Subplots dealing with issues of gender equality, alienation, the Paris Commune, May 1968 and situationist politics itself are riddled throughout the film.

== Similar films ==
The film has been compared to La Chinoise by Jean-Luc Godard, due to its usage of anti-capitalist political theory and Chinese imagery.

== Historical context ==
According to Richard Metzger, of Dangerous Minds, the film is "a critique of class conflicts, bureaucratic socialism, the failures of the French Communist Party, Maoism, cultural hegemony, sexual equality and the way movies prop up Capitalist ideology."

The Situationist movement argued that the persistence of capitalism relied on the system turning lived experiences into "anaesthetizing ‘spectacles’ that perpetuated alienation." Viénet's layering of radical Marxist discourse over a martial arts film delivers political messages through the use of humour as a way of "forcing audiences to actively confront the mechanics of their own entertainment."

The film is one of the few remaining examples of a situationist use of cinema, since Guy Debord withdrew his films from circulation.
