= Consort Zhuang =

Consort Zhuang may refer to:

- Empress Dowager Xiaozhuang (1613–1688), concubine of Hong Taiji
- Consort Zhuang (Jiaqing) (died 1811), concubine of the Jiaqing Emperor
