= Garden of Serenity =

Museum

Coordinates: 39.1223°N 117.1828°E

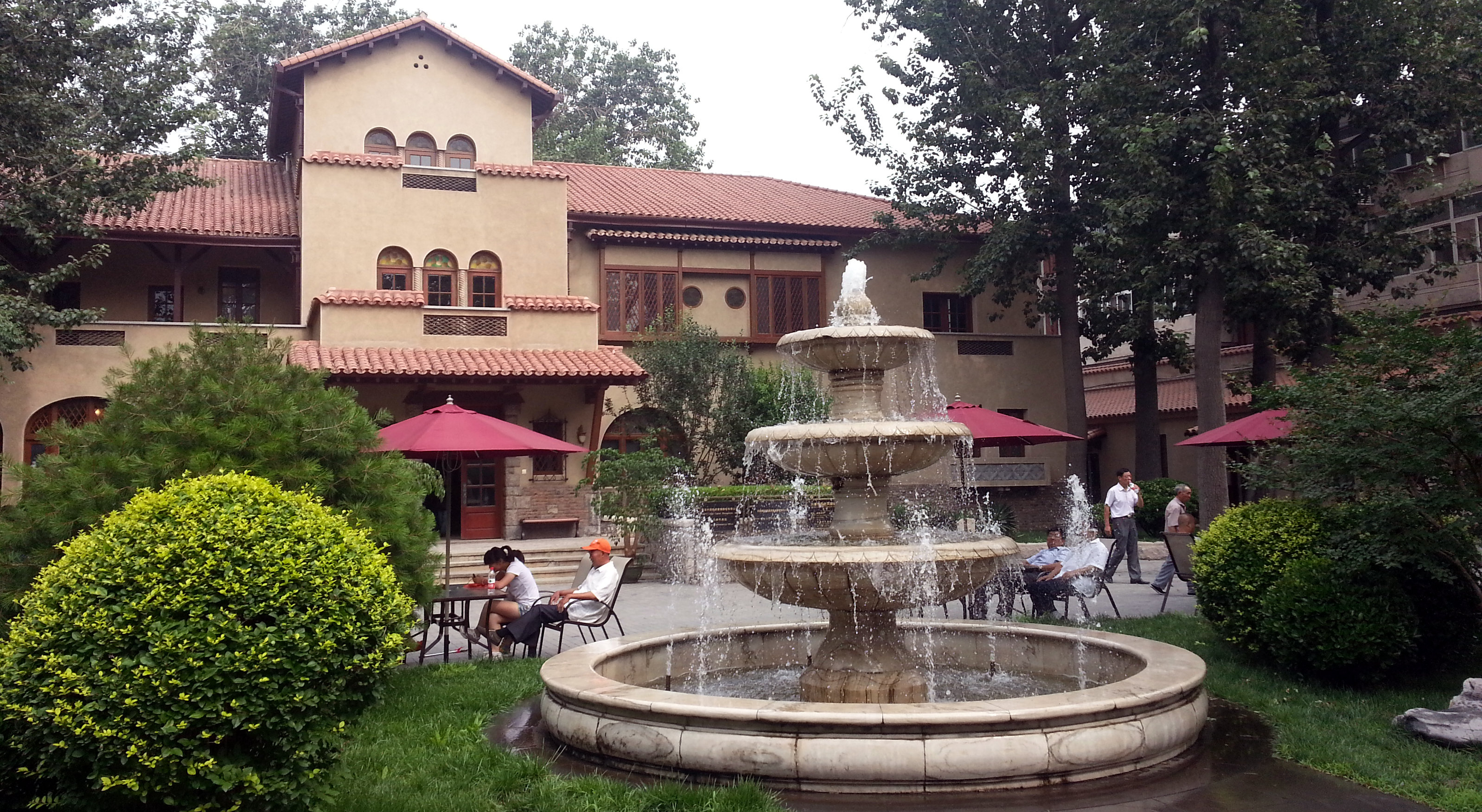
Quiet Garden Villa, as it looks today

The Garden of Serenity or Jingyuan (靜園) is a museum and former residence of Puyi, the last emperor of China in Tianjin, China.

== History ==
Located at 70 Anshan Road (then Miyajima Road) in the then Tianjin Japanese Concession, the Garden of Serenity was the residence of Lu Zongyu, a warlord and a member of the Senate during the Republican era. In July 1929, Puyi moved to the villa and changed the name to "Jingyuan''. Puyi lived there until 1931 before moving to Manchukuo.

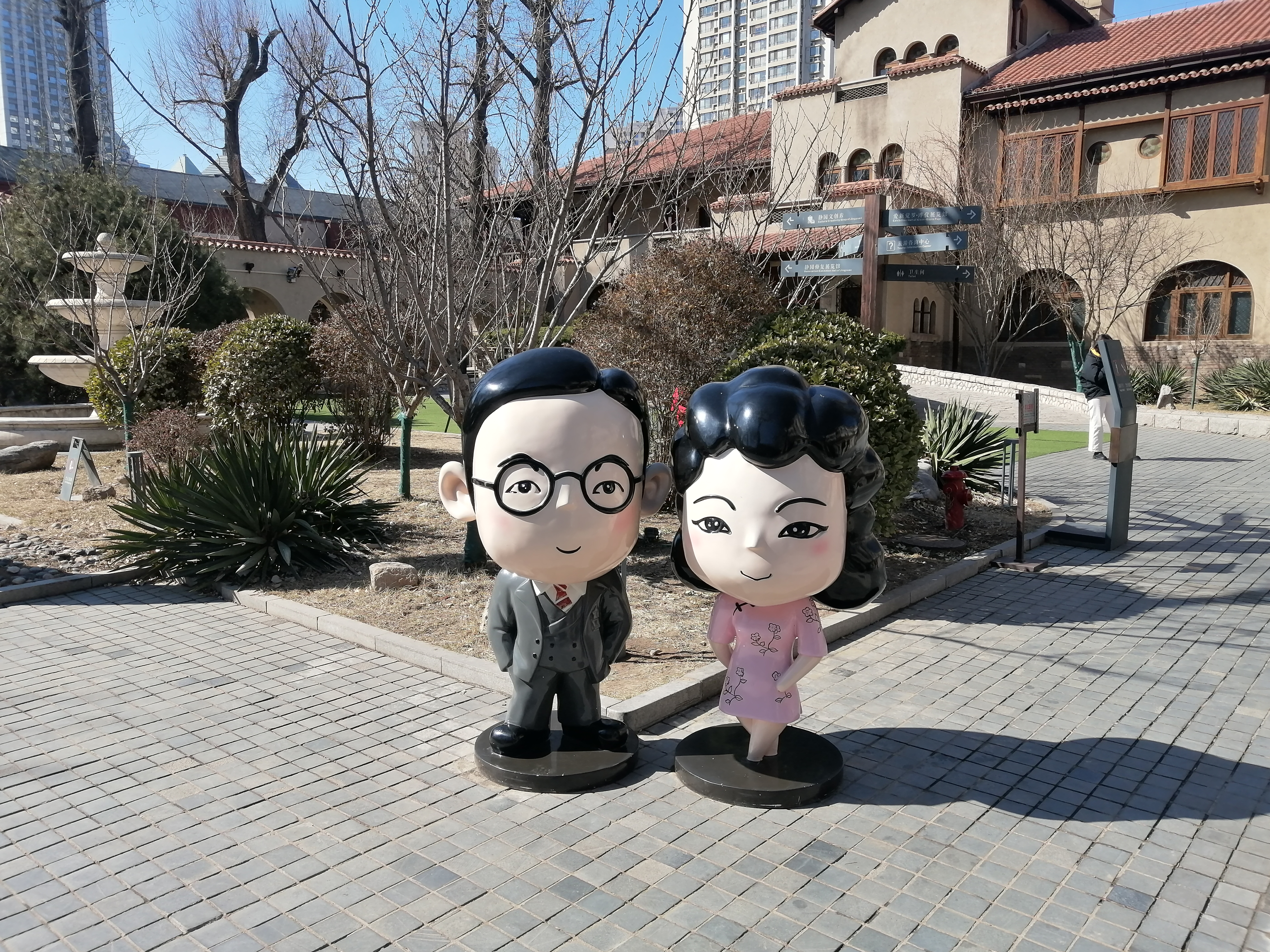
Statues of Puyi and Wanrong at the Jing Garden

The building was later used for offices and was subsequently renovated and changed with parts of the Garden of Serenity being demolished. Buildings added to Garden of Serenity after Puyi's departure were later demolished in the 2000s in an attempt to restore the building to its previous appearance during the 1920s and 1930s before becoming a museum. Today the museum displays exhibits and displays relating to Puyi, the last emperor of China

== Gallery ==
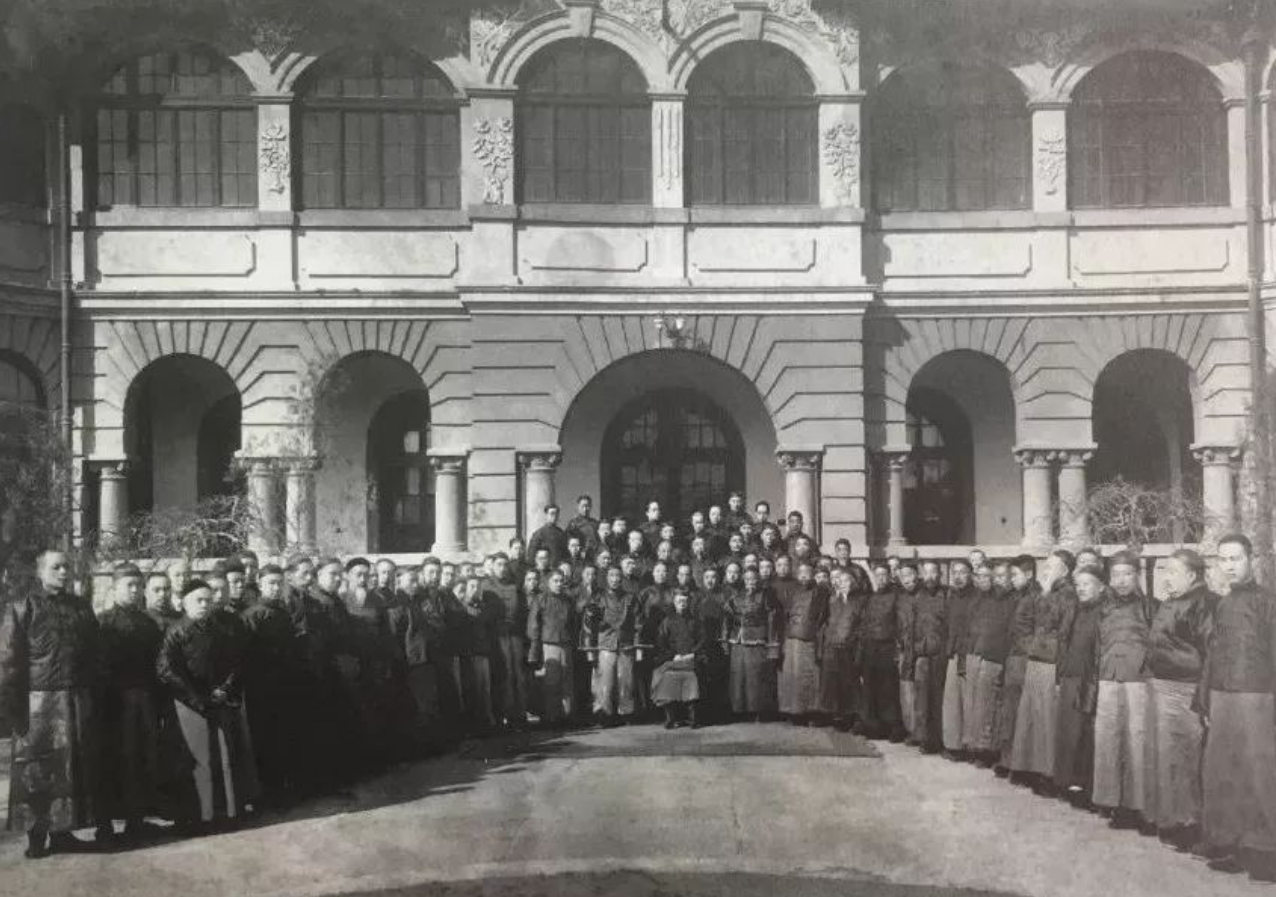
Puyi at Jingyuan

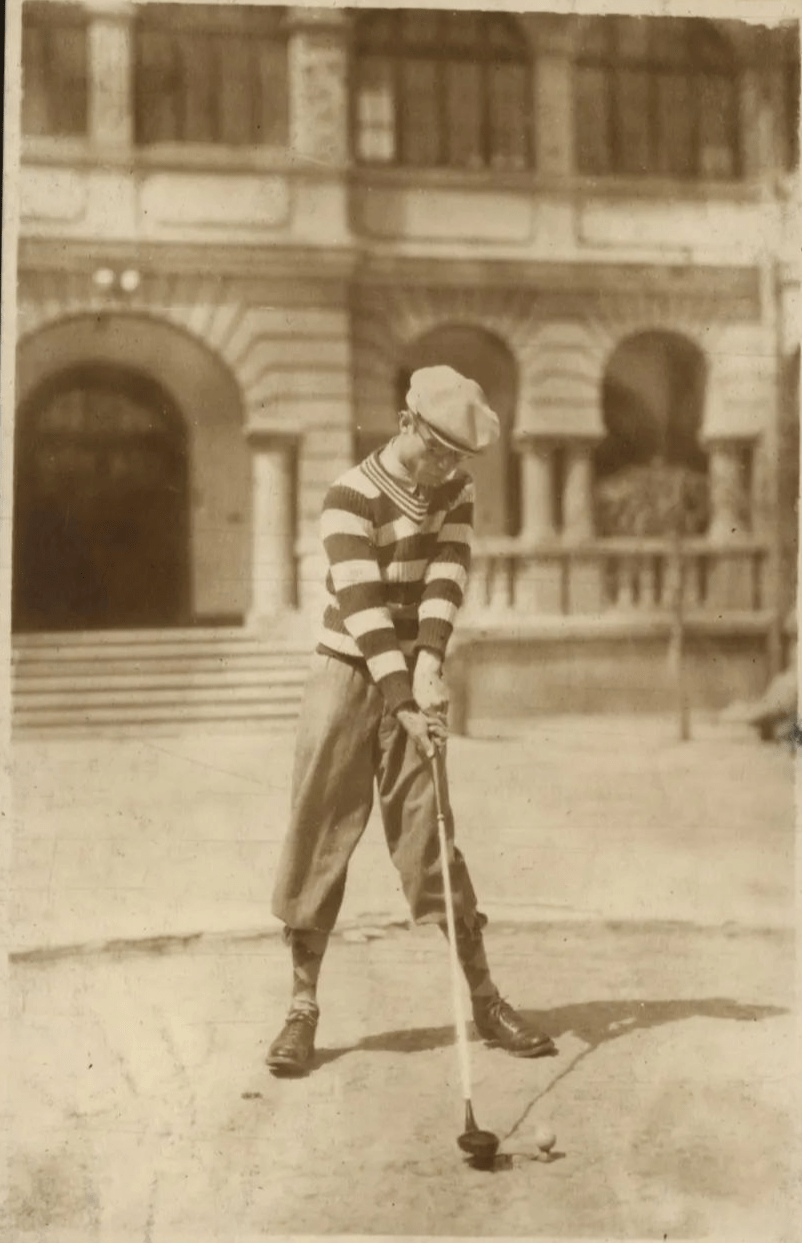
Puyi playing golf at Jingyuan

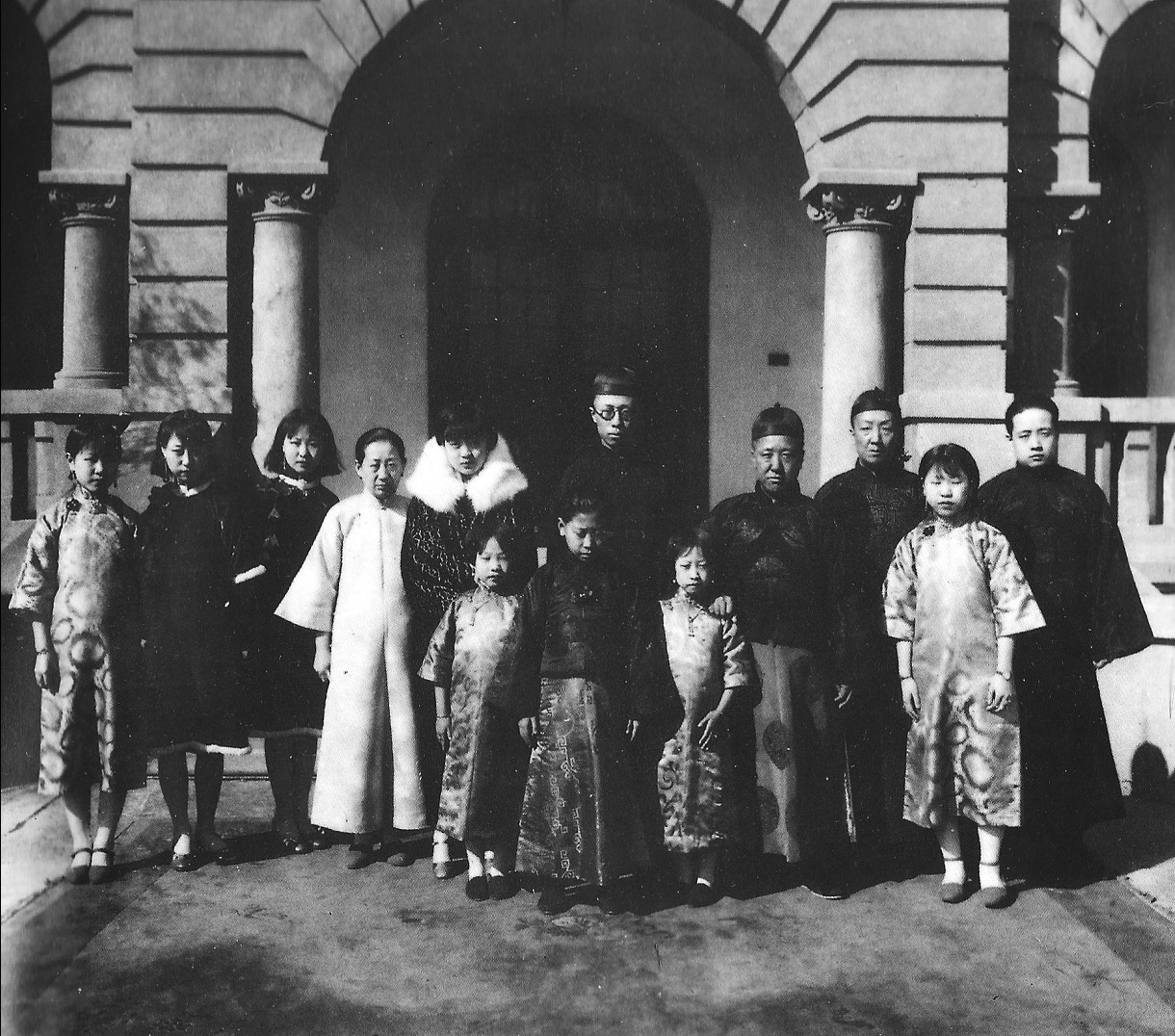
Puyi and Wanrong at Jingyuan

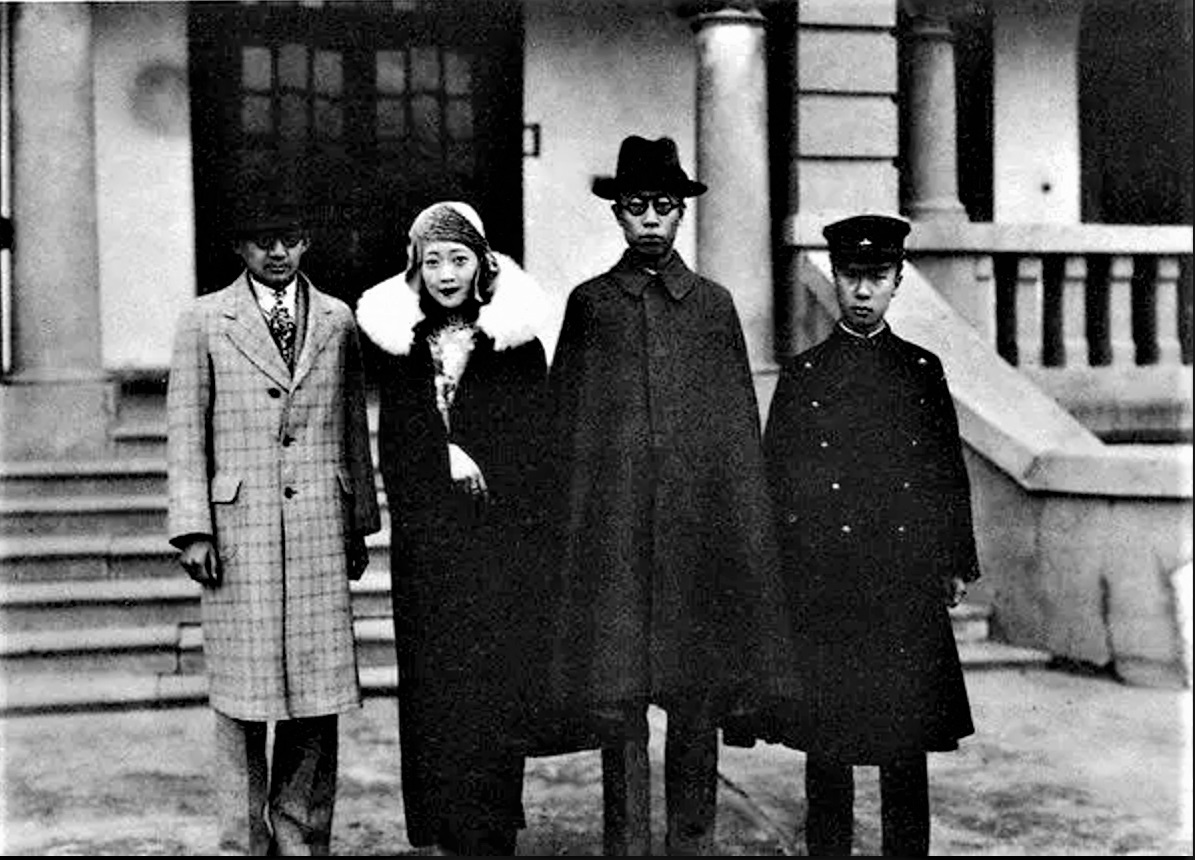
Runqi, Wanrong, Puyi and Pujie at Jingyuan

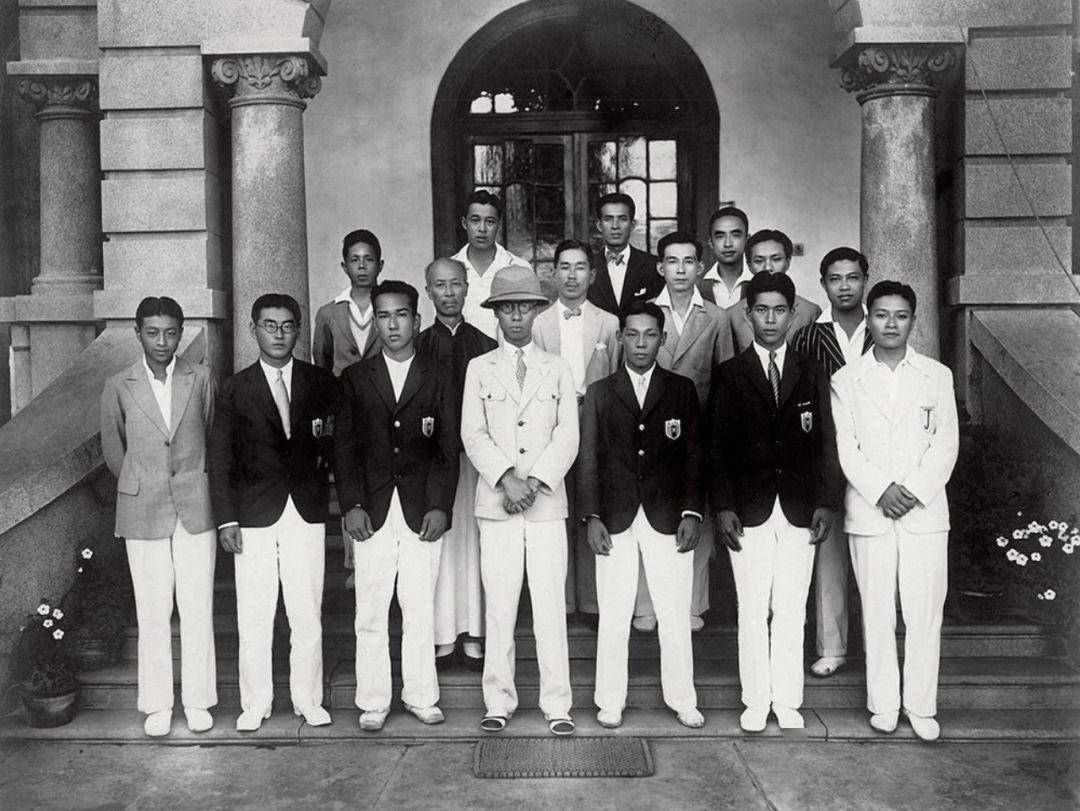
Puyi and Zheng Xiaoxu with others at Jingyuan

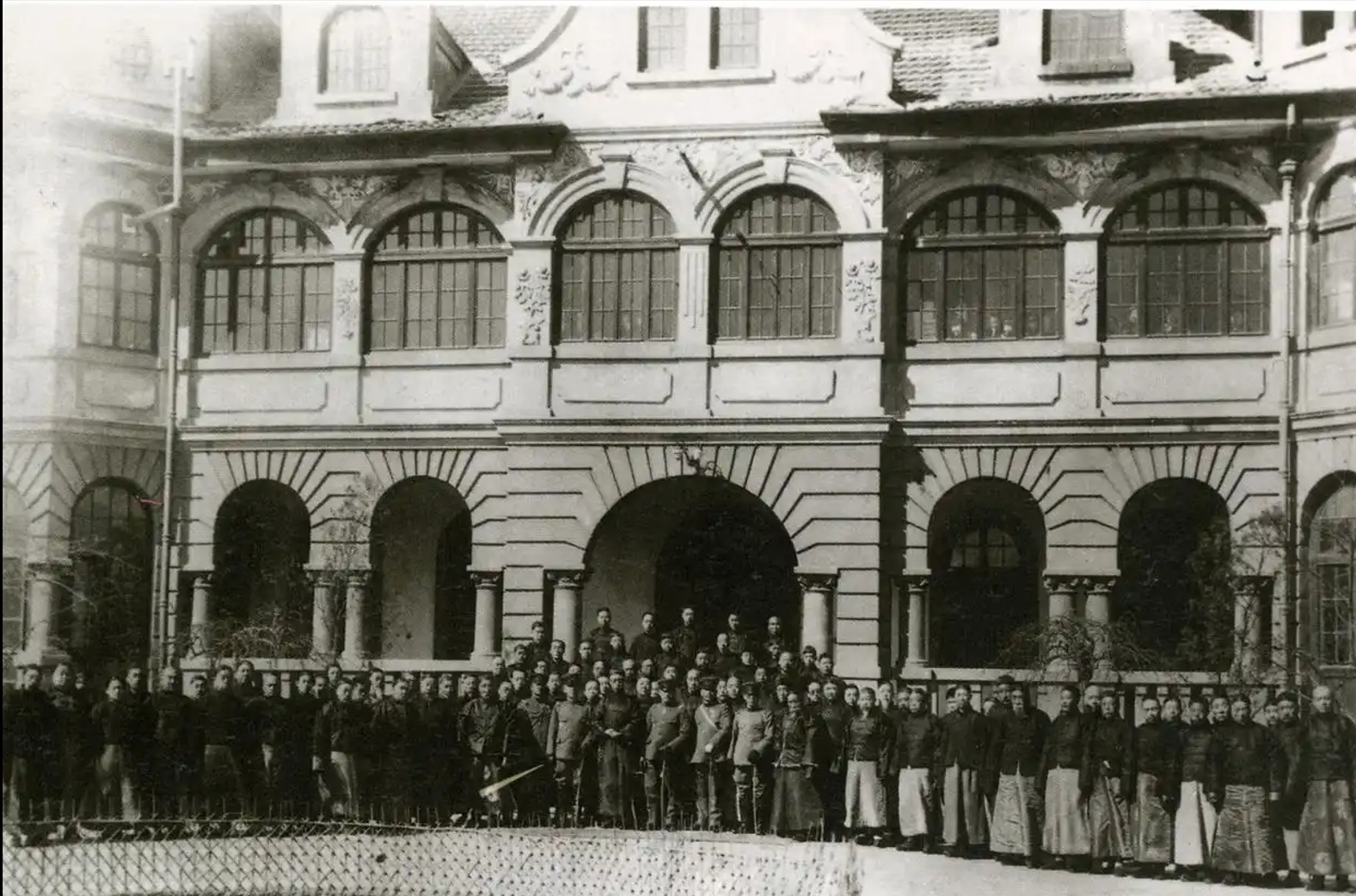
Puyi in the Jing Garden

== See also ==
- Foreign concessions in Tianjin
- Wanrong
- Wenxiu
