= Lin Tsan-ting =

Taiwanese cinematographer (1930–2025)

- 林贊庭
- Born: 22 March 1930; Toyohara District, Taichū City, Taiwan, Empire of Japan
- Died: 14 March 2025 (aged 94); Tri-Service General Hospital, Neihu District, Taipei, Taiwan
- Citizenship: Taiwan
- Known for: Cinematography
- Children: Jong Lin

Lin Tsan-ting (Chinese: 林贊庭; pinyin: Lín Zàntíng; 22 March 1930 – 14 March 2025) was a Taiwanese cinematographer known for his extensive contributions to Taiwanese cinema. Born in Fengyuan District, Taichung, Taiwan, he began his career in 1949 as an apprentice at the Agricultural Education Motion Pictures studio, which later evolved into the Central Motion Picture Corporation. Throughout his career, Lin worked on over 130 films, earning multiple accolades, including four Golden Horse Awards for Best Cinematography and the Asia Pacific Film Festival Award for Best Cinematography. In 2021, he received the Golden Horse Lifetime Achievement Award, becoming the first cinematographer to be so honored. Lin played a large role in transitioning Taiwan's film industry from black-and-white to color production and mentored many aspiring cinematographers.

== Early life ==
Lin Tsan-ting was born on 22 March 1930, in Fengyuan District, Taichung, Taiwan. After graduating from high school, he began his filmmaking career in 1949 as an apprentice at the Agricultural Education Film Studio, the predecessor of the Central Motion Picture Corporation (CMPC).

== Career ==
Over the course of his six-decade career, Lin worked on more than 130 films, collaborating with director Pai Ching-jui on several notable projects, such as Lonely Seventeen ("寂寞的十七歲") and Home Sweet Home ("家在台北"). His exceptional cinematography earned him multiple accolades, including four Golden Horse Awards for Best Cinematography and the Asia Pacific Film Festival Award for Best Cinematography for Falling Snowflakes ("雪花片片"). In 2021, at the age of 91, Lin was honored with the Golden Horse Lifetime Achievement Award, becoming the first cinematographer to receive this recognition.

== Personal life ==
Lin Tsan-ting had one son, Jong Lin in 1958 who also became a notable cinematographer in Taiwan.

== Death ==
Lin died from a heart attack on 14 March 2025, at the age of 94.

== Legacy ==
Beyond his cinematic achievements, Lin Tsan-ting played a crucial role in advancing Taiwan's transition from black-and-white to color film production, helping shape the industry during this transformative period. He founded the I-feng Film Studio ("益豐片廠") and served as president of the Chinese Society of Cinematographers. Lin also authored An Overview of Taiwanese Cinematography Development, 1945-1970, a work documenting the evolution of film production in Taiwan.

== Selected filmography ==
Year	Film	Role
1964	The Best Secret Agent	Director of Photography
1967	Lonely Seventeen	Director of Photography
1968	The Love in Okinawa	Director of Photography
1968	The Lost Romance	Director of Photography
1968	The Swordsman of All Swordsmen	Director of Photography
1968	The Sunset Over the Horizon	Director of Photography
1969	The Bride & I	Director of Photography
1969	Accidental Trio	Director of Photography
1970	Goodbye! Darling	Director of Photography
1971	Come Haunt with Me	Director of Photography
1971	Hotel Esquire	Director of Photography
1973	Love Begins Here	Director of Photography
1973	Two Ugly Men	Director of Photography
1973	Morning Goodbye!	Director of Photography
1974	Falling Snowflakes	Director of Photography
1974	Girl Friend	Director of Photography
1974	My Father, My Husband, My Son	Director of Photography
1974	To Money With Love	Director of Photography
1976	The Autumn Love Song	Director of Photography
1976	Victory	Director of Photography
1976	The Chasing Game	Director of Photography
1977	There's No Place Like Home	Director of Photography
1978	Dream of the Red Chamber	Director of Photography
1979	The Gnome	Director of Photography
1980	Poor Chasers	Director of Photography
1981	The Coldest Winter in Peking	Director of Photography
1983	The Wheel of Life	Director of Photography
1983	Last Night's Light	Director of Photography
1983	Ah Fei	Director of Photography
1984	Shanghai Blues	Director of Photography
1984	The Last Night of Madame Chin	Director of Photography
1985	Run Tiger Run	Director of Photography
1985	Love, Lone Flower	Director of Photography
1985	The Campus Incidents	Director of Photography
1986	Classmate Party	Director of Photography
1987	The Missing People	Director of Photography
1987	Farewell to the Channel	Director of Photography
1989	Tian Xia Di Yi Ban	Director of Photography

== See also ==
- Jong Lin
- Chin Ting-chang
- Chung Mong-hong
