= Crush (1972 film) =

1972 Hong Kong film by Tu Guangqi

- Canadian film poster
- Traditional Chinese: 唐手跆拳道
- Simplified Chinese: 唐手跆拳道
- Hanyu Pinyin: Táng Shǒu Tái Quán Dào
- Jyutping: Tong4 Sau2 Toi4 Kyun4 Dou2
- Directed by: Tu Guangqi
- Written by: Ching Chung
- Screenplay by: Ni Kuang
- Produced by: Yeung Man-yi
- Starring: Chan Hung-lit; Jason Pai Piao; Ingrid Hu
- Edited by: Vincent Leung
- Music by: Chow Siu-lung; Wu Dajiang
- Production company: Yangtze Productions
- Release date: 20 June 1972
- Country: Hong Kong
- Language: Mandarin

The Crush (Chinese: 唐手跆拳道; released in the UK as Kung Fu Fighting) is a 1972 Hong Kong martial arts film directed by Tu Guangqi and starring Chan Hung-lit, Jason Pai Piao and Ingrid Hu. The film was shot in South Korea and depicts South Korea under Japanese rule in the early 20th century.

== Cast ==
- Chan Hung-lit as Japanese head villain
- Jason Pai Piao as Huang
- Ingrid Hu as Korean female fighter
- Tony Lo as Korean man
- Steve Chan as Cruel Japanese Lieutenant
- Kwan Yung-moon as Son of Korean Master
- Lee Fung-lan
- Han Tae-Il
- Kim Ki-bum as Elder Japanese
- Hung Pau-hei
- Wong Sau-sau
- Bae Su-cheon as Japanese thug
- Kim Young-In as Huge Japanese
- Chiu Tak-ming as Chinese Kung Fu Kid

== Détournement and Reimagining of the movie ==
French sinologist, situationist writer, and filmmaker René Viénet repurposed footage primarily from the movie Crush to make his 1973 situationist film Can Dialectics Break Bricks? Using an approach known as “détournement,” generally employed to raise awareness about political and social issues, Viénet inlaid Crush with Marxist ideas. He creatively replaced or overdubbed the original Chinese dialogues with French ones, in addition to re-editing the footage.
