= Return of the Kung Fu Dragon =

- Directed by: Chick Lim Yu
- Written by: Lee Ge-Sun (screenplay); Yu-Yen Lin (story)
- Produced by: Wen Ho Chen; Hsiang Ping Liu
- Starring: See below
- Edited by: Yen Chu Lieh
- Music by: Mou Shan Huang
- Release date: 1976
- Country: Taiwan
- Language: Mandarin

Return of the Kung Fu Dragon (Chinese: 砲傌俥; Mandarin: Ju ma pao) is a 1976 Taiwanese film directed by Chick Lim Yu.

== Plot summary ==
Set on Phoenix Island in the South China Sea, the film follows characters including a prince, a princess, and a dwarf with powers of invisibility who join forces to reclaim their kingdom from an evil tyrant.

== Cast ==
Actor	Credited as	Character
Polly Kuan 上官靈鳳	Sun-Kuan Rin-Feng	Ma Chan-Chen, the Black Girl
Nick Cheung Lik 張力	Chang Li	Che Kwan Yu
Chan Sing 陈星	Chen Hsin	General Che Chan
Li Chung-Chien 李中堅	Lee Chung-Gian	Pao Ta-Hsiung
Sze-Ma Yu-Chiao 司馬玉嬌	Sma Yu-Chia	Hsiao Yu, Princess of the Golden City
Tsai Hung 蔡弘	Tsai Hon	Evil Wizard
Tung Li 董力		General Black
Yuan Chuan 川原	Chuan Yun	General Ma Tsen-Kung
Tien Yeh 田野	Tien Yei	Emperor of the Golden City
Chi Lin 林玑	Lin Gi	Yen C, Princess mother
Hsiao Wang 小王		Hou Ping, midget servant
Tao Chen		
Chen Wen Ho 陳文和		
Yuan Shen 原森		Hsiang Shou-Tien of Chi Pan Mountain
Yang Fang 楊芳		Evil Wizard's apprentice
Eh Mao		
Lu Chiu Lung		
Ma Li Chu		
