= Fearless Fighters =

1971 Hong Kong-Taiwanese film by Mou Man-hung

- United States film poster
- 頭條好漢
- Directed by: Mou Man-hung
- Written by: Heung Yeung
- Produced by: Tung Yueh-chian
- Starring: Chan Hung-lit; Yik Yuen; Cheung Ching-ching; Chiang Ming; Mo Man-hung; Ma Kei; Mo Man-ha; Wong Fei-lung; Kwan Hung
- Cinematography: Wai Ho-hap
- Production company: Hong Kong New China Film Company
- Release date: 27 May 1971
- Running time: 83 minutes
- Countries: Hong Kong; Taiwan
- Language: Mandarin

Fearless Fighters (頭條好漢), also known as Ninja Killer and A Real Man, is a 1971 Hong Kong–Taiwanese wuxia film directed by Mou Man-hung, starring Shaw Brothers Studio veteran actors Chan Hung-lit and Yik Yuen, and other cast members from Hong Kong and Taiwan.

== Synopsis ==
To Pa and several members of his Eagle Claw Fighting Clan are repulsed in their attempt to rob government gold by Chen Chen-chow, the Lightning Whipper. The clan does a second attack and is successful in getting the gold and also fatally wounding the Lightning Whipper. However, Lei Peng executes a surprise move, gets the gold, and plans to return it to the government. But the vengeful To Pa convinces the police that Lei Peng is the robber, and Lei Peng is arrested and jailed. To Pa murders Lei Peng's entire family, with the exception of a son who escapes and is befriended by the mysterious Lady Tieh. To Pa gets the gold again and takes it to his hideout. Then Chen and Mu Lan, the Lighting Whipper's son and daughter, rescue Lei Peng from jail. Lady Tieh, Lei Peng, Chen and Mu Lan band together as the Fearless Fighters and go after To Pa.

== Cast ==
- Chan Hung-lit as the Killer
- Yik Yuen as Lei Peng
- Chang Ching-ching as Mu Lan
- Chiang Ming as Chen
- Mo Man-hung as To Pa
- Ma Kei as Chen Chen-chow
- Mo Man-ha as Lady Tieh
- Wong Fei-lung
- Kwan Hung
