= Polly Shang-Kuan Ling-feng =

Taiwanese actress

- 上官靈鳳
- Born: Hsu Chih-mei (許治美); Hsu Yi-mei (許詒美); 10 October 1949 (age 77); Pingtung County, Taiwan Province, Taiwan
- Occupation: Actress
- Years active: 1967–1981

Polly Shang-Kuan Ling-feng (traditional Chinese: 上官靈鳳; simplified Chinese: 上官灵凤; pinyin: Shàngguān líng fèng; Jyutping: soeng6 gun1 ling4 fung6) (born October 10, 1949) is a Taiwanese actress and martial artist who has been active in Hong Kong cinema.

== Filmography ==
- Top Fighter 2 (1996)
- Super Dragon (1982)
- Heroine of Tribulation (1981)
- Green Dragon Inn (1979)
- Heroes in the Late Ming Dynasty (1979)
- Immortal Warriors (1979)
- Red Phoenix (1979)
- Bruce Li's Magnum Fist (1978)
- The Eighteen Jade Arhats (1978)
- Five Elements of Kung Fu (1978)
- The Last Battle of Yang Chao (1978)
- Little Hero (1978)
- Lung Wei Village (1978)
- Return of the Kung Fu Dragon (1978)
- The Shaolin Kids (1978)
- Zodiac Fighters (1978)
- Bruce, Kung Fu Girls (1977)
- Chin Sha Yen (1977)
- Fight for Survival (1977)
- The Mysterious Heroes (1977)
- Secret of Kowloon Town (1977)
- Shaolin Death Squads (1977)
- Shaolin Traitor (1977)
- Tigresses (1977)
- 18 Bronzemen (1976)
- General Stone (1976)
- Heroine Kan Lien Chu (1976)
- Invincible Super Guy (1976)
- Return of The 18 Bronzemen (1976)
- The Traitorous (1976)
- Bons Baisers de Hong-Kong (1975)
- Chinese Amazons (1975)
- The Crazy Guy (1975)
- Heroes Behind the Enemy Lines (1975)
- Heroine (1975)
- Chinatown Capers (1974)
- Empress Dowager's Agate Vase (1974)
- The Rangers (1974)
- The Venturer (1974)
- Back Alley Princess (1973)
- A Gathering of Heroes (1973)
- A Girl Called Tigress (1973)
- Seven To One (1973)
- A Girl Fighter (1972)
- The Ghostly Face (1971)
- The Brave And The Evil (1971)
- The Ghost Hill (1971)
- Morale And Evil (1971)
- Rider of Revenge (1971)
- The Bravest Revenge (1970)
- The Grand Passion (1970)
- Swordsman of All Swordsmen (1968)
- Dragon Gate Inn (1967)

== Awards ==
She received the 1973 (11th) Golden Horse Award for Best Leading Actress for the film Back Alley Princess aka. A Heroic Fight (馬路小英雄).
