= Bronze Head And Steel Arm =

1972 Taiwanese-Hong Kong film by Gam Sing Yan

- Directed by: Gam Sing Yan
- Release date: 1972
- Countries: Taiwan; Hong Kong
- Language: Mandarin

Bronze Head And Steel Arm is a 1972 kung fu film directed by Gam Sing Yan. The film is a Taiwanese-Hong Kong co-production.

== Cast ==
- Tien Peng

== Distribution ==
The film was banned in Singapore for usage of many "gangland weapons" by Singapore's Board of Film Censors.
