= Kissed by the Wolves =

1975 Hong Kong film by Chan Hung Lit

- Traditional Chinese: 狼吻
- Simplified Chinese: 狼吻
- Hanyu Pinyin: Láng wén
- Jyutping: Long4 man5
- Directed by: Chan Hung Lit
- Written by: Ni Kuang; Yau-Daai On-Ping; John Yip
- Produced by: Gouw Hiap-Hoo
- Starring: Alan Tang; Pan Yin Tze; Dean Shek; Lydia Shum; Chan Hung Lit; Steve Chen Hao
- Production company: Hung Cheung
- Distributed by: Goldig Films Ltd.
- Release date: 8 May 1975
- Country: Hong Kong
- Language: Mandarin

Kissed by the Wolves (Chinese: 狼吻) is a 1975 Hong Kong adult film directed by famous Shaw Brothers villain actor Chan Hung Lit, who also acts in a supporting role. It stars Alan Tang, Pan Yin Tze, Dean Shek and Lydia Shum. This film won "Best Cinematography" at the 21st Asia Pacific Film Festival.

== Cast ==
- Alan Tang
- Pan Yin Tze
- Dean Shek
- Lydia Shum
- Chan Hung Lit
- Steve Chen Hao
- Tina Chin
- Fung Hak On
- Ouyang Sha-fei
