= The Bravest Revenge =

1970 Hong Kong film by Lung Chien

- Wu lin long hu dou
- Directed by: Lung Chien
- Written by: Ge Tien
- Produced by: L.S. Chang
- Starring: Polly Shang-Kuan; Tien Peng
- Release date: 1970
- Running time: 91 minutes
- Country: Hong Kong
- Languages: Cantonese; Mandarin

The Bravest Revenge
- Traditional Chinese: 武林龍虎鬥
- Simplified Chinese: 武林龍虎鬥
Transcriptions
Standard Mandarin
- Hanyu Pinyin: Wu lin long hu dou

The Bravest Revenge, also known as Wu lin long hu dou (Chinese: 武林龍虎鬥), is a 1970 Hong Kong action martial arts film directed by Lung Chien, produced by L.S. Chang, and starring Polly Ling-Feng Shang-Kuan, Peng Tien and Yuan Yi.

== Plot ==
Polly's father is murdered, and it's duty for her, her brothers and the King of Sword to revenge him.

== Cast ==
- Polly Shang-Kuan as Shi Fang Yi
- Tien Peng as Cai Ying Jie
- Yi Yuan as Chao Mu Tien
- Ma Chi as Shi Yu Long
- Wan Chung Shan as Zhu Yi Feng
- Hsieh Han as Shan Fei
- Kao Ming
- Huang Chun
- Shao Lo Hui
