= Tien Peng =

Tien Peng (Chinese: 田鵬; born 1945) is a Chinese actor and director who has been active in Taiwan cinema and Hong Kong cinema. His name also appears as Tin Peng.

== Filmography ==
Filmography as actor, unless otherwise noted.

- The Desperate Prodigal (1985). Director, Actor
- Majestic Thunderbolt (1985)
- Virago (1984)
- Three Famous Constables (1983)
- Demon Fighter (1982)
- Escape To Freedom (1982)
- Jade Dagger Ninja (1982)
- Lone Ninja Warrior (1982)
- Dark Lady Of Kung Fu (1981)
- Eagle's Claw And Butterfly Palm (1981)
- Ninja Swords Of Death (1981)
- Jade Fox (1980)
- The Legend of Broken Sword (1980)
- Mask Of Vengeance (1980)
- Silver Spear (1980). Director, Actor
- Veiling Of Hidden Sword (1980)
- Witty Hand, Witty Sword (1980)
- Heroes In The Late Ming Dynasty (1979)
- The Samurai (1979)
- Scorching Sun, Fierce Winds, Wild Fire (1979)
- Wanderer With Nimble Knife (1979)
- Bruce Li's Magnum Fist (1978)
- The Flower, The Killer (1978)
- The Lawman (1978)
- The Shaolin Kids (1978)
- Assassin (1977)
- Imperial Sword (1977)
- Legend Of All Men Are Brothers (1977). Director, Actor
- Lost Swordship (1977)
- Pai Yu Ching (1977)
- 18 Bronzemen (1976)
- Return Of The 18 Bronzemen (1976). Cameo
- Majesty Cat (1975). Director, Actor
- Strange Odyssey (1975)
- Tigers At Top (1975)
- The Notorious Bandit (1974). Director, Writer, Actor
- The Virgin Mart (1974)
- Murder Masters Of Kung Fu (1973)
- Big Fight, The (1972)
- Bronze Head And Steel Arm (1972)
- Chaochow Guy (1972)
- A Girl Fighter (1972)
- Tough Duel (1972)
- Cruel Killer (1971)
- Duel of Karate aka. To Subdue Evil (1971)
- The Ghost Hill (1971)
- The Lost Romance (1971)
- Rider Of Revenge (1971)
- A Touch of Zen (1971) - Ouyang Nian
- The Bravest Revenge (1970)
- The Melody Of Love (1969)
- The Swordsman of All Swordsmen (1968)
- Dragon Gate Inn (1967)

== Awards ==
Tien Peng received a Special Award at the 7th Golden Horse Awards in 1969.
