= A Girl Fighter =

1972 Taiwanese-Hong Kong film by Yeung Sai Hing

- Directed by: Yeung Sai Hing
- Written by: Yang Shih-Ching; Wong Chung
- Produced by: Ha Ng Leung-Fong; Cheung Tiu-Yin
- Cinematography: Chan Wing Shu; Chan Ching Kui
- Edited by: Johnson Chow Shui-Yuen
- Music by: Joseph Koo Ka Fai
- Production company: Union Film (聯邦影業有限公司)
- Release date: 1972
- Countries: Taiwan; Hong Kong
- Language: Mandarin

A Girl Fighter (Chinese: 女拳師) is a 1972 film. A Taiwanese-Hong Kong co-production, it was directed by Yeung Sai Hing (楊世慶, Yang Shih-Ching).

== Cast ==
- Polly Shang-Kwan Ling Feng
- Tien Peng
- Law Bun
- Cho Kin
- Chan Wai Lau
- Miu Tin
- Lui Ming
- Man Chung San
- Got Heung Ting
- Go Ming
- Chiu Ting
- Chui Fook Sang
- Got Siu Bo
- Ricky Hui
- Hung Fa Long
- Seung-Goon Leung
- Tse Chung Mau
