= Blood of the Dragon (film) =

1971 Hong Kong-Taiwanese film by Kao Pao-shu

- Theatrical release poster
- 追命槍
- Directed by: Kao Pao-shu
- Written by: Ni Kuang; Kao Pao-shu
- Produced by: Park Vengee
- Starring: Jimmy Wang
- Cinematography: Kwok Poon-kai
- Edited by: Fan Kung-ming
- Music by: Flood
- Production company: Park Films
- Distributed by: Harnell-Independent
- Release date: 8 December 1971
- Running time: 96 minutes
- Countries: Hong Kong; Taiwan
- Language: Mandarin

Blood of the Dragon (追命槍), also known as The Desperate Chase, is a 1971 Hong Kong–Taiwanese wuxia film starring Jimmy Wang.

== Plot ==
Chinese rebels attempt to oust Mongol forces that have conquered the land. A dying rebel entrusts a street urchin with delivering a secret message to a prince. A lone warrior, White Dragon, helps the street urchin deliver the message.

== Cast ==
- Jimmy Wang Yu as White Dragon / Lung Tai
- Ted Henning - English voice of Lung Tai
- Lisa Chiao Chiao as Miss Yan
- Yau Lung as Ni Chiu
- Yeung Yeung as Ma Tang
- Miao Tian as Sing Pa-tou
- Yee Yuen as General Tai
- Got Siu-bo as Minor Official
- Kong Ching-ha as Mrs Yang
- Su Chen-ping as Kang Fu's Offsider
- O Yau-man as Gold Leopard
- Au Lap-bo as Waiter
- Wong Fei-lung as Kang Fu (credited as Lung Fei)
- Lui Jun as Mr Yang
- Yuen Sam as Ma Tang's Lieutenant
- Cheung Yee-kwai as Thug
- Wong Wing-sang as Thug
- Yu Chung-chiu
- Tin Yau as Ma Chin
- Gam Man-hei
- Man Git
- Hau Pak-wai
- Wong Kwok-fai as Soldier
- Lau Yau-bun as Soldier

== Critical reception ==
DVD Talk rated the film "3 out of 5" and wrote in its review, "Wang Yu always did better when his stuff was outrageous, and this one just misses that mark, though he looks better with a weapon than in hand to hand combat. The soundtrack, by a group called Flood (obviously inserted on the film by some US/Euro distributor) is pure 70's prog rock and adds a nice giggle to the proceedings.
