= Duel with Samurai =

1971 Taiwanese film by Chin Sheng-en

- Film poster
- 太極劍決鬥武士刀
- Directed by: Chin Sheng-en
- Screenplay by: Kuo Chia
- Produced by: Cheung Chung-lung; Siu Piu-wah
- Starring: Chan Hung-lit; Li Hsuan; Kong Ban
- Cinematography: Cheng Kit
- Edited by: Chung Ming
- Music by: Wong Ho-yan
- Production company: Film Line Enterprises
- Release dates: 3 September 1971 (Taiwan); 8 September 1971 (Hong Kong)
- Running time: 86 minutes
- Country: Taiwan
- Language: Mandarin

Duel with Samurai (太極劍決鬥武士刀) is a 1971 Taiwanese wuxia film directed by Chin Sheng-en, starring Chan Hung-lit as a rōnin who arrives in China during the Ming dynasty and causes havoc in the jianghu. The film was released on 3 September 1971 in Taiwan, and five days later on 8 September 1971 in Hong Kong.

== Synopsis ==
The film is set in China during the Ming dynasty when the wokou are ravaging the coastal regions of Zhejiang and Fujian. The wokou's leader, a rōnin, colludes with local lowlifes to plunder villages and towns. Fan Zhendong, a young swordsman, rallies other martial artists in the jianghu to rise up and resist the wokou incursions.

== Cast ==
- Chan Hung-lit as the rōnin
- Kong Ban as Fan Zhendong
- Li Hsuan
- Chiang Ching-hsia
- Yen Chung
- Yu Chung-chiu
- Su Chen-ping
- Su Chin-lung
- Chen Shih-wei
- Chin Wan-che
- Cheung Yee-kwai
- Tong Fuk-hung
- Wong Cheung
- Xiao Yang
- Chiang Tao
- Yeung Fui-yuk
- Wong Fei-lung
- Lee Keung
- Cheung Siu-kwan
- Ho Wai-hung
- Wong Hoi
