= The Ghostly Face =

1971 Indonesian-Hong Kong film by Shih-Ching Yang

- Directed by: Shih-Ching Yang
- Starring: Polly Shang-Kuan Ling-feng
- Release date: 1971
- Countries: Indonesia; Hong Kong
- Languages: Indonesian; Mandarin

The Ghostly Face is a 1971 martial arts film directed by Shih-Ching Yang. It is an Indonesian-Hong Kong co-production.
