= Duel of Karate =

1971 Hong Kong film by Fu Ching-hua

- Film poster
- Traditional Chinese: 鐵沙掌決鬥空手道
- Simplified Chinese: 铁沙掌决斗空手道
- Hanyu Pinyin: Tiě Shā Zhǎng Jué Dòu Kōng Shǒu Dào
- Jyutping: Tit3 Saa3 Zeong2 Kyut3 Dau3 Hung1 Sau2 Dou6
- Directed by: Fu Ching-hua
- Screenplay by: Lin Ching-chieh; Chen Hsiao-tao
- Produced by: Fu Ching-hua
- Starring: Chan Hung-lit; Tien Peng; Yik Yuen; Doris Lung; Sham Suet-chun
- Cinematography: Wu Chia-chun
- Edited by: Leung Pak-wing
- Music by: Chow Leung
- Production company: Lucky Star Film Company
- Distributed by: Eng Wah & Co. HK; Ocean Shores Video
- Release date: 1971
- Running time: 86 minutes
- Country: Hong Kong
- Language: Mandarin

Duel of Karate, also known as To Subdue Evil and To Subdue the Devil, is a 1971 Hong Kong martial arts film produced by and directed by Fu Ching-hua and starring Chan Hung-lit and Tien Peng as twin brothers who were separated at a young age after their parents were murdered by the chief antagonist (Yik Yuen).

== Plot ==
Three years ago, Iron Palm School head instructor Lung Shao-kang (Wong Chun) defeats Lei Chi (Yik Yuen) in a duel match. Three years later, Lei murders Lung after extensively training in karate. Lung's twin sons, Wei and Yu, were separated at young age as a result. Yu was adopted by Uncle Wang, a member of the Iron Palm school, while Wei was taken in by Lei. Twenty years later, Yu (Tien Peng) inherits the Iron Palm kung fu from Uncle Wang, while Wei (Chan Hung-lit) becomes Lei's right-hand man, pitting the two brothers against each other on opposite sides.

== Cast ==
- Chan Hung-lit as Lung Wei
- Tien Peng as Lung Yu
- Yik Yuen as Lei Chi
- Doris Lung as Hsiao Chun
- Sham Suet-chun as Hu Sao
- Wong Chun as Lung Shao-Kang
- Law Ban as Chung Chuan
- Lung Siu
- Li Min-lang as Chiao Bun
- Shao Luo-huo
- Yueh Feng
- Su Chin-lung as Kuan Chi
- Kang Ming
- Chen Chien-ping as Hu Ta-hsing
- Wong Chau-hung
- Chiang Tao
- Au Lap-po as Fighter in Japanese school
- Wu Ling as Mother in opening
- Ya Ming as Boy in opening

== Crew ==
- Action Director: Yen Yu-lung
- Production Manager: Lee Po-tong
- Sound Recordist: Kwong Wu
- Script Supervisor: Chan Chun-yuk
- Lighting: Cheung Tak-yam
- Planning: Luo Hai-nan
- Makeup: Cheung Pik-yuk
- Assistant Director: Lam Kwok-leung
- Props: Chang Huan-kon

== Production ==
Duel of Karate was produced by Hong Kong's Lucky Star Films Company, but was filmed on location in Taiwan.
