= Kao Pao-shu =

Chinese and Hong Kong actress, film director and writer (1932–2000)

- Born: 1932; Jiangsu. China
- Died: 23 July 2000 (aged 67–68)
- Occupations: Actress, director

Kao Pao-shu
- Chinese: 高寶樹
Transcriptions
Standard Mandarin
- Hanyu Pinyin: Gāo Bǎoshù
Yue: Cantonese
- Jyutping: gou^{1} bou^{2} syu^{6}

Kao Pao-shu or Gao Baoshu (Chinese: 高寶樹; 1932–2000) was a Chinese actress, producer, writer and film director who appeared in over 100 films during her career. Originally from China, Kao moved to Hong Kong in 1951, where she acted in minor roles before joining Shaw Brothers Studio in 1958. Here, she starred in over 80 films, working alongside directors Yueh Feng and Cheng Kang, and she made her directorial debut in 1970 in Lady with a Sword. Later she started her own company, producing films throughout the 1970s before she retired in the 1980s. In July 2000, she died at the age of 68.

== Biography ==
Kao was born in Jiangsu, China, and left school at the age of thirteen to find work following the death of her father. She worked as a reporter in Anhui and joined a drama troupe where she met actor Chiang Nan, whom she later married. In 1951, Kao moved to Hong Kong and worked with a number of production companies including Hsin Hwa Motion Picture Company, where she appeared in Hong Kong's first Eastman Color film Blood Will Tell (海棠紅) (1955). Kao joined Shaw Brothers Studio in 1958, where she appeared in over 80 films and directed her first film, Lady With a Sword (鳳飛飛) (1970).

By 1971, Kao had left the Shaw Brothers and started up her own production company alongside her second husband, Vengee Park. The new company, Park Films, produced eleven films, with Kao directing ten and acting as writer for six. After finishing her final film in 1980, Kao left the industry and died in 2000.

== Filmography ==
=== Films ===
This is a partial list of films.

Year	Title	Role	Notes
1970	A Place to Call Home	Julie Liou	
1971	Lady with a Sword	Director	Directorial debut.
1971	The Desperate Chase	Director	
1972	The Cannibals	Director	
1973	Win Them All	Director	
1974	The Virgin Mart	Director	
1975	Female Fugitive	Director	
1976	Wrong Side of the Track	Director	
1977	The Damned	Director	
1979	The Jade Fox	Director	
1980	The Master Strikes	Director	
1980	Seed of Evil	Director	
