= The Bedevilled (film) =

1975 Hong Kong film by Lo Wei

- Directed by: Lo Wei
- Written by: Lo Wei
- Starring: O Chun Hung; Reiko Ike; James Tien; Yeung Lan; Dean Shek; Lee Kwan
- Cinematography: Cheung Yiu Cho
- Edited by: Peter Cheung
- Music by: Joseph Koo
- Distributed by: Golden Harvest
- Release date: 1975
- Country: Hong Kong
- Language: Mandarin

The Bedevilled is a 1975 Hong Kong horror film directed by Lo Wei and released under the Golden Harvest banner.

== Cast ==
- O Chun Hung
- Reiko Ike
- James Tien
- Wong Lan
- Dean Shek
- Lee Kwan
- Ouyang Sha-fei
- Wong Sam
- Gam Dai
