= The Swordsman of All Swordsmen =

- Taiwanese film poster
- Directed by: Joseph Kuo
- Screenplay by: Hsu Tien-yung; Joseph Kuo
- Produced by: L.S. Chang
- Starring: Shang-guan Ling-feng; Tien Peng; Yang Meng-hua; Chiang Nan; Tsao Tsien
- Cinematography: Lin Tsan-ting
- Edited by: Chiang Shu-hua
- Music by: Li Szu
- Production company: Union Film Company
- Release date: October 6, 1968
- Running time: 87 minutes
- Country: Taiwan
- Language: Mandarin

The Swordsman of All Swordsmen (Chinese: 一代劍王; pinyin: Yi dai jian wang) is a 1968 Taiwanese wuxia film directed by Joseph Kuo.

== Cast ==
- Shang-guan Ling-feng as Flying Swallow
- Tien Peng as Tsai Ying-jie
- Yang Meng-hua as the daughter of the travelling performer
- Chiang Nan as Black Dragon
- Tsao Tsien as Yun Chun-chung
- Miao Tien as Chou Hu
- Ko You-min as Fang Bao
- Lu Shih as Liu Xiang
- Hsueh Han as Yin Shih

== Production ==
Taiwan produced its first martial arts film with Jade Carp in a Gold Pot (1958). During the 1960s and 1970s, there was a rise in the popularity of martial arts films in Taiwan. By 1968, the country had produced at least eighty-seven martial arts films.

The director of the film was Joseph Kuo, who began directing Taiwanese drama films in the late 1950s. The film was developed by the Union Film Company, which was set up in Taiwan in 1965. The Swordsman of All Swordsmen was released the year after King Hu's Dragon Inn for the same company and was part of the new wave of wuxia films that came from the film's popularity.

== Release ==
The Swordsman of All Swordsmen was released on October 6th, 1968. It was screened at the Far East Film Festival in 2022.

The Swordsman of All Swordsmen was released for the first time in the United Kingdom through a blu-ray release on March 18, 2024. Included with the release was another film directed by Kuo: The Mystery of Chess Boxing (1979).

== Reception ==
From retrospective reviews, Ralpha McLean of The Irish News wrote that The Swordsman of All Swordsmen wrote that the film sometimes felt not overtly original as it was indebted to the more recent King Hu films, but it was "still a beautiful slice of stately martial arts movie-making". He highlighted the "lush cinematography" from Lin Tsan-ting and "tight editing" from Chiang Shu-hua.

In the book The New Essential Guide to Hong Kong Movies (2024) the authors complimented Joseph Kuo's direction as showing a lot of control and keeping "the usual high jumping-style fight moves to a minimum." They said the film excels in its location choices with real landscapes that differentiate the film from the more set-bound, theatrical-looking Shaw Brothers produced wuxia.

== See also ==
- List of Taiwanese films before 1970
