= All in the Family (film) =

1975 Hong Kong film by Mu Zhu

Hua Fei Man Cheng Chun
- Directed by: Mu Zhu
- Written by: Ken Suma
- Produced by: Raymond Chow
- Starring: Jackie Chan; Sammo Hung; Linda Chu; James Tien; Dean Shek
- Distributed by: Golden Harvest
- Release date: 8 February 1975
- Country: Hong Kong
- Language: Cantonese
- Box office: HK$1,062,711

All in the Family (Chinese: 花飛滿城春; pinyin: Hua Fei Man Cheng Chun) is a 1975 Hong Kong comedy film, directed by Mu Zhu and produced under Golden Harvest productions. Despite starring in the film, Jackie Chan does not appear until 1 hour into the movie.

== Plot ==
A family gathers to be with their dying father. The reunion brings old rivalries to the surface.

Mr. Hu is dying, so he calls his family to his bedside. After his death, his three sons divide Mr. Hu's belongings, leaving their mother and sister with nothing. Between them, the sister and mother came up with a plan to get revenge. The sister starts a rumor that her mother is actually very rich, when hearing the rumor, the three sons quickly return home and try to gain their mother's favor in the hope of getting the money from her.

Spring Lady is tiring of her husband, Ma, and has an eye on Little Tang, a rickshaw boy. Little Tang is in love with Lin-tze, but as Lin-tze is happily married to Chang Hsun, his attentions are soon swayed by Spring Lady. Although Ma discovers the affair, he is too busy to care.

== Cast ==
- Jackie Chan
- Sammo Hung
- Dean Shek
- James Tien

== Overview ==
Chan plays a rickshaw driver. It contains one of only two sex scenes which Chan has done, the other one being in Shinjuku Incident. It is the only film Chan has starred in where there wasn't a single fight or stunt sequence.

In 2006, Information Times quoted Chan's response to an article in the Hong Kong media regarding the film, referring to it as a pornographic film. However, the film is not actually pornography.
