= Wenxiu =

Consort of Puyi (1909–1953)

- Consort Shu (淑妃)
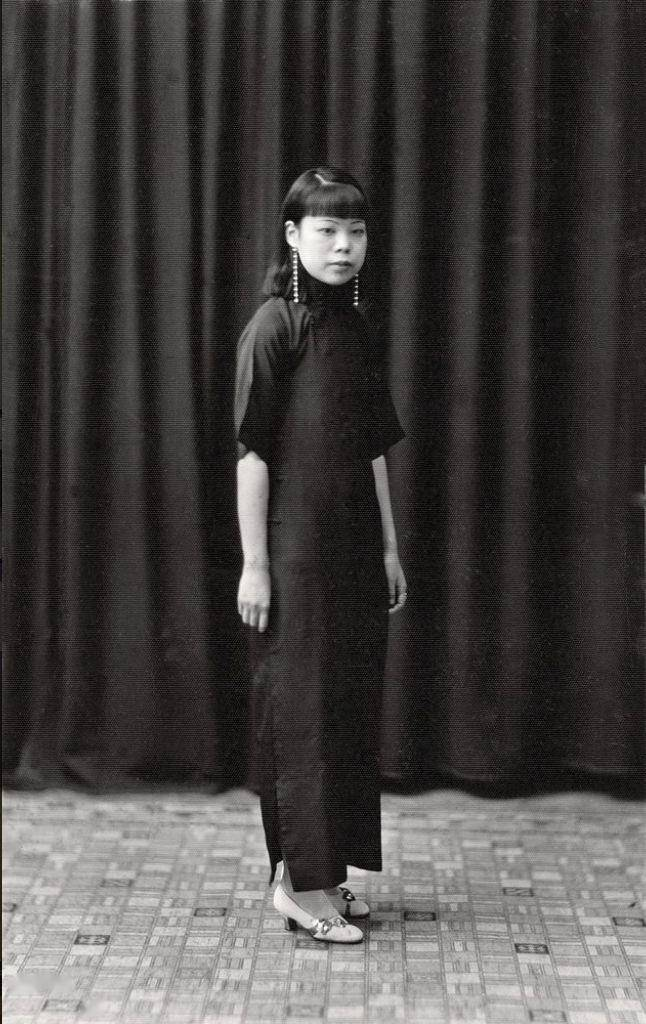
- Photograph of Wenxiu
- Born: 20 December 1909; Qing China
- Died: 17 September 1953 (aged 43); Beijing, China
- Burial: 1953; Beijing, China
- Spouse: Xuantong Emperor (m. 1922; div. 1931) Liu Zhendong (m. 1947)
Names
- Erdet Wenxiu (額爾德特·文繡)
- House: Erdet
- Father: Erdet Duangong
- Mother: Lady Jiang

Wenxiu
- Traditional Chinese: 文繡
- Simplified Chinese: 文绣
Transcriptions
Standard Mandarin
- Hanyu Pinyin: Wénxiù

Lady Erdet, Consort Shu
- Traditional Chinese: 淑妃額爾德特氏
- Simplified Chinese: 淑妃额尔德特氏
Transcriptions
Standard Mandarin
- Hanyu Pinyin: Shū Fēi É Ěr Dé Tè Shì

Wenxiu (20 December 1909 – 17 September 1953), also known as Consort Shu (淑妃) and Ailian (愛蓮), was a consort of Puyi, the last Emperor of China and final ruler of the Qing dynasty. She was from the Mongol Erdet clan (額爾德特), and her family was under the Bordered Yellow Banner of the Eight Banners.

== Early life ==
Wenxiu was born on 20 December 1909. Her courtesy name was Huixin and her self-chosen pseudonym was Ailian. She belonged to the Mongolian Erdet clan of the Manchu Bordered Yellow Banner. Her father was Duangong (1852–1908), and her mother was Lady Jiang. She also had a sister named Wenshan. During her childhood, Wenxiu attended school, and was given the name Fu Yufang.

== Marriage to Puyi ==
In 1921, Wenxiu was among the candidates listed as suitable by the Qing court as Empress consort. The eligible candidates were not paraded before the emperor as had previously been the tradition; instead, they had their photographs taken and presented to Puyi, who was encouraged to choose his empress from among them.

Puyi himself claimed that he had chosen Wenxiu as his empress rather than Wanrong. However, his choice was not approved because of a conflict among his predecessor's widows, who had different favorites among the candidates.

When the time came for Puyi to marry, Imperial Noble Consort Duankang (Lady Tatara) and Imperial Noble Consort Jingyi had an argument over who should be the empress. Lady Tatara favoured Wanrong, while Jingyi preferred Wenxiu. In Lady Tatara's opinion, Wenxiu was not beautiful enough to be empress, and she came from a lesser family background than Wanrong. Despite this, Puyi's first choice was Wenxiu, which frustrated Lady Tatara. She held a discussion with other nobles and officials in the imperial court, who persuaded Puyi to select Wanrong as his empress, naming Wenxiu as a consort.

Wenxiu was taken to the court before Wanrong and welcomed her when she arrived in 1922.

== As imperial consort ==
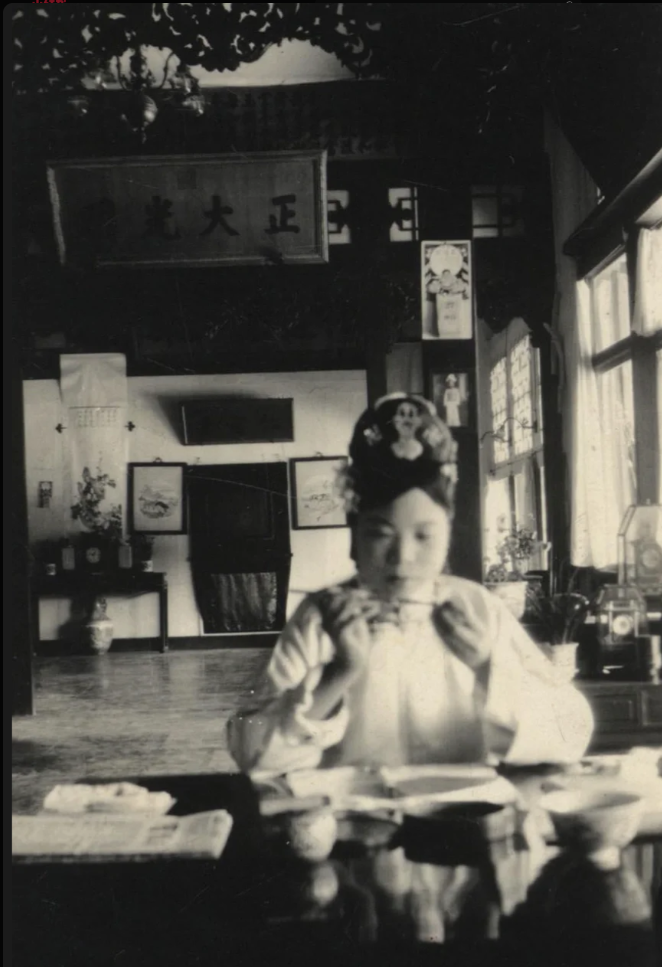
Concubine Wenxiu in the Forbidden City, 1920s

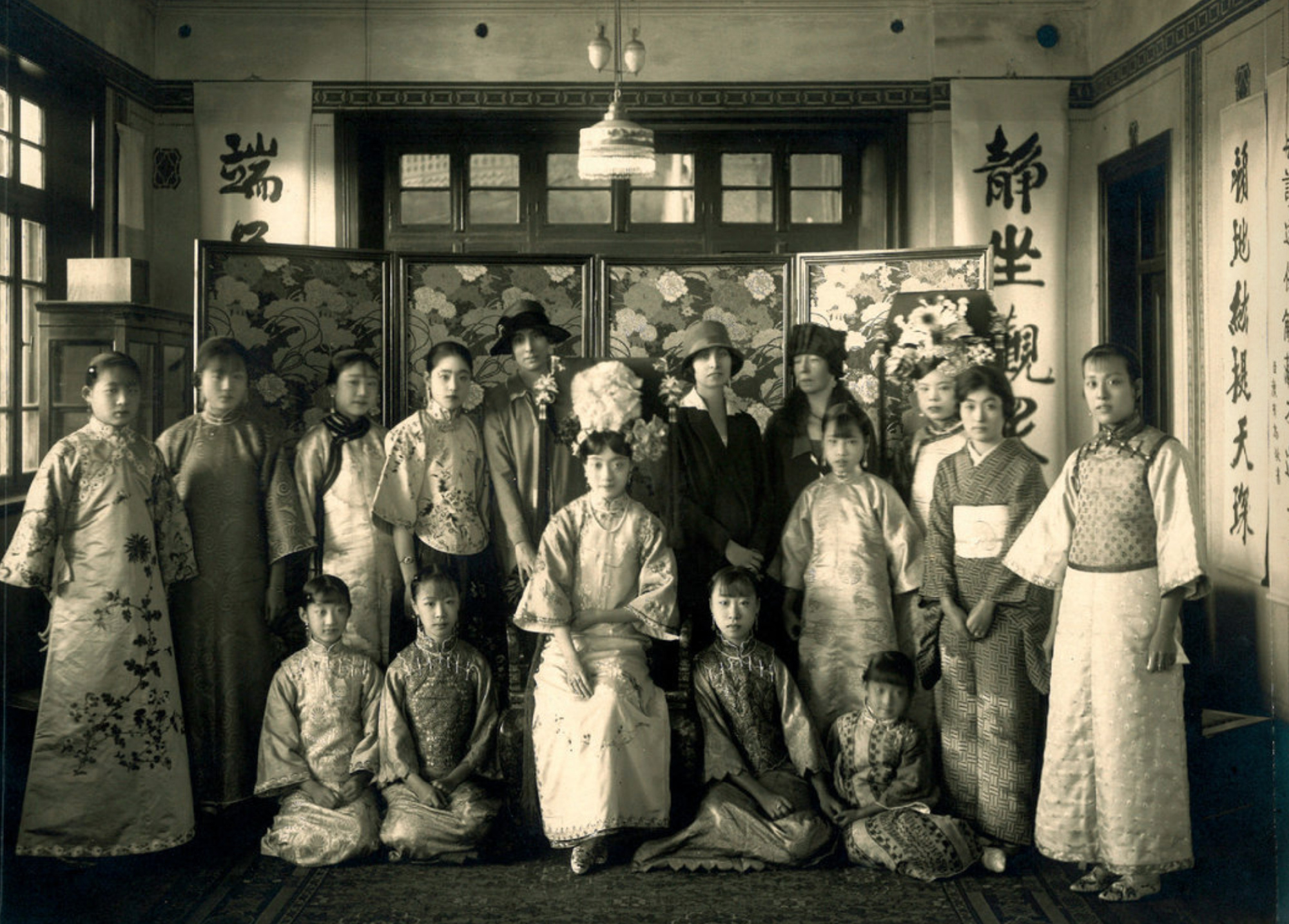
Wenxiu in Tainjin, 1925-1931 (back row, furthest-right)

Wenxiu said of her time in the Forbidden city:

There was a generator in the palace, but it often broke down and it was common to have power failure. Puyi didn't live with his Empress or his Consort, so I had to live alone in the spacious Changchun Palace. The nights were so long and so horrible, and the loneliness in my heart was hard to be got rid of. I lit a candle and faced the lonely lamp, waiting until the candle was burned most. When the wick became longer and the light shadow began to swing, I would take a pair of scissors to cut the wick shorter. A spell of indescribable mawkishness ran through me and I thought: I was just like this half-burned candle whose tears would run out soon and whose life would be turned into a smoke. Was this place really a palace of magnificence? Maybe it was just a macabre grave!

Wanrong, who was unhappy with Puyi having another wife, wrote a letter to Wenxiu critical of her, while they both lived in the Forbidden City.

== Life in Tianjin ==
Along with Puyi and Empress Wanrong, Wenxiu left the Forbidden City in 1924, and moved to the Zhang Garden (张园) in the Japanese Concession of Tianjin. Later, they moved to the Jing Garden. According to Puyi, during this period Wenxiu and Wanrong were both obsessed with luxury and material possessions, specified by the fact that as soon one of his consorts was given a gift, the other one demanded to be given the same.

Wenxiu reminisced on her time at the Zhang Garden (their first home) in Tianjin, recalling:

Puyi and Wanrong lived on the second floor, and I lived in a room next to Puyi's parlor on the first floor. Though we lived in the same building, we didn't visit each other if there was nothing important. We seemed to be strangers with each other in the street. Wanrong put on airs of being an empress all day round and was arrogant. Puyi always believed what she said and they both showed the cold shoulder on me. The feelings between Puyi and me disappeared gradually day by day.

Wanrong noted in her diary that on 14 August 1931, Wenxiu had seen her from a window in the act of smoking opium, and called out (to Wanrong):

Why should you take opium? You'd better stab your belly. Why could you still be alive but not kick the bucket? Why wouldn't you jump from the high building or jump into the river? Why just follow my steps to have a drink? I have survived so many times... I have changed my mind and I won't commit suicide any longer. You don't need to sell.. for me.

Wanrong, who had mixed feelings for Wenxiu, having her badly rebuked and scolded for spitting in the courtyard near her, seeing it as a secret insult, wrote a diary entry reflecting the crisis that Wenxiu was going through, noting that Wenxiu had stabbed herself with a pair of scissors. The Empress attempted to improve the situation by suggesting to Puyi that they have dinner together, with Puyi replying (in English): "You mustn't, if you call her here, I won't eat."

Puyi normally went out with Wanrong, often leaving Wenxiu at home. Further deepening the breakdown in relations, on one occasion Wenxiu scolded a eunuch who had ignored her. Puyi, who was nearby, misinterpreted this as an attack on him and put out an edict, knowing she was potentially suicidal, ordering Wenxiu to die.

== Divorce ==
Wenxiu was more dissatisfied with her life than Wanrong, and ultimately, status was less important to her. Wenxiu had secretly planned a divorce with help from her sister and used an outing with her sister, with permission granted by Puyi, as an opportunity to escape from the Jing Garden. Wenxiu and her sister drove to a hotel where lawyers were waiting. She filed for and was granted a divorce in 1931, just months before Puyi and Wanrong moved to Manchukuo.

According to Puyi, Wenxiu demonstrated great courage and willpower during the proceedings, as her wish was greatly disapproved of. Puyi claimed that a relative of Wenxiu wrote in distaste of the decision. Following the divorce, Puyi, urged by former Qing officials, stripped Wenxiu of her imperial titles. According to Puyi, Wenxiu worked as a school teacher for some years after the divorce. Puyi later blamed Wanrong, who disliked that Puyi had another wife, for the divorce.

== Later life and death ==
Wenxiu married Major Liu Zhendong in 1947 at the well-known Dongxing Pavilion (东兴楼) in Beiping (present day Beijing). Liu later ran a car rental business, which soon went into bankruptcy. Later, their landlord fled following the surrender of Beiping in 1948 (which was renamed "Beijing" in 1949 at the end the Chinese Civil War). After the war, Liu confessed to the government regarding their historical issue and found a job in a cleaning services company. They lived in poverty in a 10-square-metre (110 sq ft) house.

Wenxiu died with only her husband by her side in their house at 10 p.m. (22:00 China Standard Time) on September 17, 1953. Later, with the help of her husband and his group of cleaning service colleagues, she was buried outside the Andingmen.

In 2004, the descendants of the imperial house of the Qing Dynasty granted posthumous titles to Puyi, his two spouses, and his two consorts. However, Wenxiu did not receive a posthumous title because she was considered to have been reduced to the status of a commoner after she divorced Puyi.

== See also ==
- Ranks of Imperial Consorts in China
- Qing Dynasty nobility
- Wenxiu Wikimedia photos
