= Lady with a Sword =

1971 Hong Kong film by Kao Pao-shu

- Directed by: Kao Pao-shu
- Written by: Kuang Ni
- Produced by: Runme Shaw
- Starring: Lily Ho
- Cinematography: Hsin Chang
- Edited by: Hsing-Lung Chiang
- Release date: 15 October 1971

Lady with a Sword (or Feng Fei Fei) is a 1971 Shaw Brothers–produced movie starring Lily Ho and helmed by actress Kao Pao-shu in her directorial debut.

The Chinese martial arts drama stars Ho as a young woman bent on revenge after her eldest sister is murdered. Ho's character soon finds out that her own fiancé (played by Nan-Kung Hsun, A.K.A. James Nam) is involved with the crime. His parents pressure her to forgive him, but she ultimately exacts bloody retribution.

The film was presented in U.S. theaters during the spring of 1972 with English subtitles rather than dubbing.
