= Consorts of the Jiaqing Emperor =

The Jiaqing Emperor of China's Qing dynasty had a total number of 17 imperial consorts, including 2 empresses, 2 imperial noble consorts, 4 consorts, 6 concubines, 2 noble ladies and 1 first class attendant.

== Empresses ==
1. Empress Xiaoshurui (孝淑睿皇后), of the Hitara clan (喜塔臘氏; 2 October 1760 – 5 March 1797)
2. Empress Xiaoherui (孝和睿皇后), of the Niohuru clan (鈕祜祿氏; 20 November 1776 – 23 January 1850)

== Imperial noble consorts ==
1. Imperial Noble Consort Heyu (和裕皇貴妃), of the Liugiya clan (刘佳氏; 9 January 1761 – 27 April 1834)
2. Imperial Noble Consort Gongshun (恭順皇貴妃), of the Niohuru clan (鈕祜祿氏; 28 May 1787 – 23 April 1860)

== Consorts ==
=== 1. Consort Shu ===
Consort Shu (恕妃 完颜氏; d. 1792) was a member of the ancient Wanyan clan.

Father: Hafeng'a (哈丰阿), held the title of master commandant of light chariot (轻车都尉, pinyin: qingcheduwei)

One sister: Primary Consort of Mianke, Prince Zhuangxiang of the First Rank, Mianke (庄襄亲王 绵课 嫡福晋)

==== Qianlong era ====
Lady Wanyan entered the residence of Prince Jia of the First Rank in 1786 and was granted the title of "Secondary Consort" (侧福晋). Her father who became a general of the Eight Banners in Shaanxi, later wrote a memorial thanking for the grace of his daughter. She remained childless until her death in 1792.

==== Legacy ====
In 1797, Lady Wanyan was posthumously given the title "Consort Shu" (恕妃; "shu" meaning "forgiving"). Her coffin was interred in 1803 at Chang Mausoleum in the Western Qing tombs.

== Concubines ==
=== 1. Concubine Jian ===
Concubine Jian (簡嬪 關氏; d. 14 May 1780) was a booi aha of the Han Chinese Bordered Yellow Banner Guan clan. Her personal name wasn't recorded in history.

Father: Decheng, a baitangga (拜唐阿)

One younger brother: Aibao (爱保), served as baitangga (拜唐阿)

==== Qianlong era ====
It is not known when Lady Guan married Yongyan, Qianlong Emperor's 15th son as a mistress. On 14 May 1780, she gave birth to Yongyan's first daughter. Unfortunately, Lady Guan died during the labor. Her sole daughter died prematurely on 24 November 1783.

==== Legacy ====
On 11 May 1797 (22nd day of the 4th month of the Jiaqing era), Lady Guan was posthumously conferred the title "Concubine Jian" (简嫔). According to the poem "Swan goose sees through needs" from 1801, "jian" means "moderate" in Manchu, but "humble" in Chinese. Lady Guan's brother, Aibao, gave thanks to the Jiaqing Emperor for the promotion of his sister. Her coffin was temporarily placed in Jinganzhuang Grieving Palace where additional promotional rites were performed. Concubine Jian was interred at the Chang Mausoleum in Western Qing tombs.

==== Titles ====
During Qianlong era:

- Lady Guan
- Mistress (格格)

During Jiaqing era:

- Concubine Jian (简嫔); from 11 May 1797

==== Issue ====
- First daughter (14 May 1780 – 24 November 1783)

=== 2. Concubine Xun ===
Concubine Xun (遜嬪 沈氏; d. 31 December 1786) was Han Chinese Booi Aha of the Plain Yellow Banner Shen clan. Her personal name wasn't recorded in history.

Father: Yonghe (永和), served as a fellow attendant of the Grand Minister of Internal Affairs (内务府大臣职衔).

==== Qianlong era ====
It is not known when Lady Shen entered the residence of Prince Jia of the First Rank, Yongyan as his mistress. On 31 December 1786, she gave birth to Yongyan's fifth daughter. Lady Shen died soon after. Her daughter died in June/July 1795.

==== Legacy ====
After the enthronement of the Jiaqing Emperor, Lady Shen was posthumously granted the title "Concubine Xun" (逊嫔; "xun" meaning "modest"). In 1818, Concubine Xun's daughter was given the title "Princess Hui'an of the Second Rank" (慧安和硕公主; "Hui'an" meaning "clever and peaceful"). Lady Shen's coffin was temporarily placed in Jinganzhuang Grieving Palace where additional promotional rites were performed. Concubine Xun was interred at the Chang Mausoleum in the Western Qing tombs.

==== Titles ====
- Mistress (格格)
- Concubine Xun (逊嫔)

==== Issue ====
- Princess Hui'an of the Second Rank (慧安和碩公主; 31 December 1786 – June/July 1795), fifth daughter

=== 4. Concubine Chun ===
Concubine Chun (淳嬪 董佳氏; d. 30 November 1819) was a member of Donggiya clan . Her personal name wasn't recorded in history.

- Father: Changshitai (长时太), served as a military official (署军).

==== Jiaqing era ====
Lady Donggiya entered the Forbidden City in 1798 as "Noble Lady Chun" (淳贵人; "chun" meaning "honest"). In May 1801, Noble Lady Chun was promoted to Concubine Chun (淳嫔). She died on 30 November 1819. Concubine Chun remained childless during Jiaqing era.

==== Titles ====
- Noble Lady Chun (淳貴人)
- Concubine Chun (淳嬪)

=== 6.Concubine An ===
Concubine An (安嬪 瓜爾佳氏; 1 March 1785 – 29 July 1837) was a member of the prominent Gūwalgiya clan belonging to the Plain White Banner. Concubine An was incorporated into the Bordered Yellow Banner. Her personal name wasn't recorded in history.

- Father: Anying (安英), served as second class imperial guard (二等侍卫) and held the title of first class Duke Xinyong (一等信勇公)
  - Grandfather: Fuxing (復興), served as left censor (左都御史), secretary in the Ministry of Public Works and General Wulisutai (乌里苏台将军)

==== Qianlong era ====
Concubine An was born on the 1 March 1785.

==== Jiaqing era ====
Lady Guwalgiya entered Forbidden City in 1801 after triennial imperial selection and was given a title "First Class Female Attendant An" (安常在; "an" meaning "peaceful"). Her residence in the Forbidden City was the Palace of Earthly Honor. The Draft History of Qing mentions that First Class Female Attendant An didn't receive her promotional document. She remained childless during Jiaqing era and was never promoted.

==== Daoguang era ====
In August 1821, Lady Guwalgiya was promoted to "Dowager Concubine An" (皇考安嫔). She lived together with Concubine Rong and Consort Xin in the Eastern Longevity Palace (寿东宫). Concubine An died on 29 July 1837 and was interred in the Chang Mausoleum in the Western Qing tombs.

== Residences in the Forbidden City of the imperial consorts ==
Year	Imperial consort	Palace	Notes
1795–1797	Empress Xiaoshurui	Palace of Great Benevolence (景仁宫; Jǐngrén Gōng)	
1795–1801	Empress Xiaoherui	Palace of Heavenly Grace (承乾宫; Chéngqián Gōng)	
1801–1820	Empress Xiaoherui	Palace of Gathering Elegance (储秀宫; Chǔxiù Gōng)	She moved there with the future Daoguang Emperor, who had been adopted by her
1801–1820	Imperial Noble Consort Gongshun	Palace of Eternal Longevity (永寿宫; Yǒngshòu Gōng)	She lived under supervision until 1805
1795–1811	Consort Zhuang	Palace of Earthly Honour (翊坤宫; Yìkūn Gōng)	She supervised lower ranking imperial consorts since 1801
1801–1820	Concubine An	Palace of Earthly Honour (翊坤宫; Yìkūn Gōng)	She lived under supervision as first attendant
1804–1805	Noble Lady Yun	Palace of Earthly Honour (翊坤宫; Yìkūn Gōng)	She lived under supervision
1798–1820	Consort Xin	Palace of Prolonging Happiness (延禧宮; Yánxǐ Gōng)	She lived under supervision as noble lady
