= The Virgin Mart =

1974 Hong Kong film by Kao Pao-shu

- Fan Mai Ren Kou
- Directed by: Kao Pao-shu
- Written by: Ni Kuang
- Starring: Chin Hu; Eddy Ko; Shih Kien
- Cinematography: Tien-You Huang
- Edited by: Lung Chiang
- Release date: 8 February 1974
- Country: Hong Kong

The Virgin Mart (aka Fan Mai Ren Kou and Bo Ming de Ren) is a 1974 Hong Kong action film directed by actress-turned-director Kao Pao-shu.

The film—which stars Chin Hu, Eddy Ko, and Shih Kien—centers around young girls who are lured to Hong Kong and trapped in a prostitution ring. The film was rated "for mature audiences."

The film opened in China in 1974, and appeared in U.S. theaters with subtitles in 1976.
