= Female Fugitive (1975 film) =

- Nu Tao Fan
- Directed by: Kao Pao-shu
- Screenplay by: Kao Pao-shu; Ni Kuang
- Starring: Pao-Shu Kao; Sombat Metanee; Chin Hu
- Cinematography: Wen Chin Lin
- Edited by: Lung Chiang
- Release date: 7 August 1975
- Country: Hong Kong

Female Fugitive (aka Nu Tao Fan, Queen of Opium, and Raachínee Fìn) is a 1975 Hong Kong action film from actress-turned-directed Kao Pao-shu.

The film—which centers on drug trafficking in Hong Kong—was released in the U.S. with subtitles in 1976. In addition to directing and co-writing the film, Kao Pao-shu also acted in the film.
