= Consort Zhuang (Jiaqing) =

Consort of the Jiaqing Emperor (d. 1811)

- Died: 9 March 1811; Western Garden, Yuanmingyuan
- Burial: Chang Mausoleum, Western Qing tombs
- Spouse: Jiaqing Emperor (before 1811)
- House: Wanyan (完颜; by birth); Aisin Gioro (by marriage)
- Father: Yilibu

Consort Zhuang
- Traditional Chinese: 莊妃
- Simplified Chinese: 庄妃
Transcriptions
Standard Mandarin
- Hanyu Pinyin: Zhuāng Fēi

Consort Zhuang (Chinese: 庄妃; pinyin: Zhuāng Fēi; died 9 March 1811), from the Manchu Wanyan clan, was a consort of the Jiaqing Emperor.

== Life ==
=== Family background ===
Consort Zhuang came from an ancient Manchu Wanyan clan. Her personal name was not recorded. Her father, Yilibu, was a provincial examination graduate (Chinese: 举人; pinyin: Jǔrén).

=== Qianlong era ===
It is not known when Lady Wanggiya married Prince Jia of the First Rank as his concubine.

=== Jiaqing era ===
In December 1796, Lady Wanggiya was given a title "First Class Female Attendant Chun" (春常在; "chun" meaning literally "spring") comparing her beauty to the eternal youth symbolized by spring. She was promoted to "Noble Lady Chun" (春贵人) in 1798. In 1801, Noble Lady Chun was promoted to "Concubine Ji" (吉嫔, "ji" meaning "auspicious"). In 1808, Concubine Ji was promoted to "Consort Zhuang" (庄妃, "zhuang" meaning "dignified"). Consort Zhuang died on 9 March 1811 in the Western Garden in Yuanmingyuan. She remained childless until her death. Her coffin was temporarily placed in the Antian Memorial Palace. Consort Zhuang was interred in the Chang Mausoleum in the Western Qing Tombs. Empress Xiaoherui personally took part in her funeral ceremony. It was uncommon for the empress to visit a concubine's grave during the Qing dynasty.

== Titles ==
- During the reign of the Qianlong Emperor (r. 1735–1796):
  - Lady Wanggiya (from unknown date)
  - Mistress (格格; from unknown date)
- During the reign of the Jiaqing Emperor (r. 1796–1820):
  - First Class Female Attendant Chun (春常在; from 1796), seventh rank consort
  - Noble Lady Chun (春貴人; from 1798), sixth rank consort
  - Concubine Ji (吉嬪; from 1801), fifth rank consort
  - Consort Zhuang (莊妃; from 1808), fourth rank consort

== See also ==
- Ranks of imperial consorts in China#Qing
- Royal and noble ranks of the Qing dynasty
