= Chan Hung-lit =

Hong Kong actor

- 陳鴻烈
- Born: Chou Hung-lieh (周鴻烈); 7 June 1943; Shanghai, China
- Died: 24 November 2009 (aged 66); Hong Kong
- Occupations: Actor; film director; film company founder; businessman
- Years active: 1964–1988, 1995–1996, 2003–2009
- Spouses: Angela Pan (m. 1971; div. 1979) Tsui Sai-wing (m. 1987–2009)
- Relatives: Chan Ban-hang (daughter), Chan Bing-sing (son), Steve Chen Hao (brother)
- Awards: TVB Anniversary Awards – My Favourite Powerhouse Actor now named: Best Supporting Actor; 2004 War and Beauty

Chinese name
- Traditional Chinese: 陳鴻烈
- Simplified Chinese: 陈鸿烈
Transcriptions
Standard Mandarin
- Hanyu Pinyin: Chén Hóng Lié
Yue: Cantonese
- Jyutping: Can4 Hung4 Lit6
- Musical career
- Also known as: Master Lit (烈爺); Brother Lit (烈哥)

Chan Hung-lit (7 June 1943 – 24 November 2009) was a Hong Kong actor famous for portraying villains from the 1960s to 1980s.

== Background ==
Chan started his acting career after joining Shaw Brothers Studio in 1964. and mainly acted in wuxia and martial arts films. He rose to fame after portraying the antagonist in the 1966 wuxia film, Come Drink with Me. Chan later got his first leading role as a protagonist in the 1970 wuxia film, The Winged Tiger. In 1988, Chan took a hiatus from his acting career and was involved in the garment industry. He later resumed his acting career by joining TVB in 1995, left the following year and did not return again until 2003. In 2004, Chan won the TVB Anniversary Award for Best Supporting Actor for his performance in the historical drama series, War and Beauty. He was the elder brother of Steve Chen Hao.

== Death ==
At 4:20 p.m. on 24 November 2009, while waiting to tape an episode of Off Pedder on TVB City, Chan Hung-lit complained of sudden chest pains and fell into a coma in the changing room. He was transported by ambulance to the emergency ward of Tseung Kwan O Hospital, where he died at 7:11 p.m. at the age of 66.

== Filmography ==
=== Films ===
Year	Title	Role	Notes/Ref.
1964	The Story of Sue San (Chinese: 玉堂春)	musician at Mei's party	
1965	The Lark (小雲雀)	reporter	
1965	The Twin Swords 鴛鴦劍俠	Zhi Yuan	
1965	Temple of the Red Lotus 江湖奇俠	Zhi Yuan	
1966	Come Drink with Me 大醉俠	Jade Faced Tiger 玉面虎	
1966	The Joy of Spring (Chinese: 歡樂青春)		
1966	The Knight of Knights 文素臣	3rd brother	
1966	Magnificent Trio (Chinese: 邊城三俠)	Bandit Leader	
1967	The Trail of the Broken Blade (Chinese: 斷腸劍)	Tu Long (屠龍)	
1967	King Drummer (Chinese: 青春鼓王)	Charlie Zhao	
1967	Sweet Is Revenge (Chinese: 大俠復仇記)	Ma Qian Li (馬千里)	
1967	The Dragon Creek (Chinese: 龍虎溝)	Wu Da Chang	
1967	Rape of the Sword (Chinese: 盜劍)	Lord Lu Tian Xia	
1967	Song of Tomorrow (Chinese: 明日之歌)	Xiao Ding	
1967	The Pearl Phoenix (Chinese: 女巡按)	Feng Chun	
1967	The Thundering Sword (Chinese: 神劍震江湖)	Bandit	
1967	That Tender Age (Chinese: 少年十五二十時)		
1968	Hong Kong Rhapsody (花月良宵)	Li Jia Wen	
1968	Death Valley (Chinese: 斷魂谷)	Jin Hu (金虎)	
1968	The Rainbow (Chinese: 虹)		
1968	Black Butterfly 女俠黑蝴蝶	Jade Nan	
1969	Dead End 死角	Wen Qiang 溫強	
1969	Twin Blades of Doom 陰陽刀	Ma Lok	
1969	Torrent of Desire 慾燄狂流	Mona's boyfriend	
1970	The Winged Tiger 插翅虎	Guo Jiou Ru 郭九如	
1970	The Iron Buddha 鐵羅漢	Master Geng Xia	
1970	A Taste of Cold Steel 武林風雲	Prince Lu Tian Xia	
1970	Unparalleled Judo Knife 獨臂空手刀		
1971	Fearless Fighters 頭條好漢	The Killer	
1971	Redbeard 紅鬍子	Szu Chih Erh	
1971	Black and White Swordsman 黑白雙俠		
1971	Duel with Samurai 太極劍決鬥武士刀		
1971	The Eight Dragon Sword 龍形八劍		
1971	Black and White Umbrellas 黑白傘		
1971	Mission Impossible 劍女幽魂	Sha Tsu	
1971	Esquire Hotel 老爺酒店	Chang Yun	
1971	Unsung Heroes of the Wilderness 大漠英雄傳		
1971	The Deceiver 騙術大王	Lead role Producer	
1971	Swordsman at Large 蕭十一郎	Escort Robber	
1971	The Invincible Sword 一夫官聞		
1971	Duel of Karate 鐵沙掌決鬥空手道	Lung Wei	
1972	When Will You Come Back Again? 幾時再回頭		
1972	Brave Girl Boxer in Shanghai 上海灘		
1972	The Gallant 一身是膽	Li San	
1972	Chivalrous Robert Lee San 燕子李三		
1972	The Champion of the Boxer 拳王之王		
1972	The Cannibals 黑吃黑	Tsang	
1972	Hong Kong Criminal Crimes 香港大劫案		
1972	The Decisive Battle 精忠報國		
1972	The Notorious Ones 辣手強徒		
1972	Crush 唐手跆拳道	Japanese Head Villain	
1972	The Bold Three 龍虎豹	Leung Tse-john (Dragon)	
1972	Blood of the Leopard 血豹		
1972	The Blind-Swordsman's Revenge 盲俠血滴子		
1972	Tough Duel 硬碰硬		
1972	On the Waterfront 黃浦灘頭		
1973	Little Tiger of Canton 廣東小老虎	Chow Bin	
1973	Na Cha and the 7 Devils 梅山收七怪		
1973	The Private Eye 大密探		
1973	Stock Fever 股票股票		
1973	Smoke in His Eye 心有點點愁		
1973	The Villains 土匪		
1974	The Little Man, Ah Fook 阿福正傳		
1974	The Country Bumpkin 大鄉里		
1974	Lovable Mr. Able 乜都得先生		
1974	The Notorious Bandit 大惡寇	Chinese broke own leg	
1974	Farewell Dearest 別了親人		
1974	The Splendid Love in Winter 冬戀	Publisher	
1974	Too Young 早婚		
1974	The Giglo 應召男郎		
1975	Kissed by the Wolves 狼吻	Supporting role Director	
1975	Great Hunter 獵人		
1975	Land of the Undaunted 吾土吾民	Han Shi Yin	
1975	The Phantom Madam Peach Blossom 桃花三娘子		
1975	Majesty Cat 南俠展昭		
1975	Eight Hundred Heroes 八百壯士		
1975	Enjoy Longevity-300 Years 遊戲人間三百年		
1975	The Winner Takes All 蠱惑女光棍才		
1975	Bald-Headed Betty 社女		
1975	Fertility Bank 肉蒲		
1976	One Armed Swordsman Against Nine Killers 獨臂拳王勇戰楚門九子	Liu, one of the nine killers	
1976	Girls in the Tiger Cage 老虎嶺女子監獄	Prison Officer	
1977	The Inheritor of Kung Fu 沖天炮	Supporting role Director	
1977	Cloud of Romance 我是一片雲	Director	
1977	Woman of the Hour 一代俠女		
1977	The Shaolin Invincibles 雍正命喪少林門	His Majesty	
1977	Lantern Street 燈籠街		
1977	Girls in the Tiger Cage 2 老虎嶺女子監獄2	Prison Chief	
1978	Interlude on Rails 我伴彩雲飛	Director	
1979	Master with Cracked Fingers 廣東小老虎	Chow Bin	
1979	Bone Crushing Kid 辣手小子	Supporting role Director	
1980	Moon Night Cutter 月夜斬		
1980	The Fool Escape 發圍		
1980	Final Mission Final 轟天煞星		
1981	Shanghai Massacre 上海灘大爺		
1981	The Desperate Prodigal 火拼浪子	Smokes a pipe	
1981	Shaolin Legend 少林寺傳奇		
1981	Big Boss 頂爺		
1981	The King of Gambler 賭王鬥千王		
1981	The Gambler's Duel 千王鬥千后		
1981	The Devil 邪魔		
1981	Fighting Duel of Death ???烈星		
1981	Queen Bee 女王蜂		
1981	The Knight of the Dazzling Scimitar 風流彎力		
1981	Di Yu Lai De Nu Ren 地獄來的女人		
1982	The Stunning Gambling 賭王千王群英會		
1982	Blood Brothers 換帖兄弟		
1982	The Sweet and Sour Cops Part II 摩登雜差		
1982	Super Dragon 風起雲湧鬥狂龍		
1982	Underground Wife 黑市夫人		
1982	Dirty Angel 沙煲兄弟		
1982	Four Encounters 酒色財氣		
1982	Escape to High Risks 變熊黑獄狂魔		
1983	A Life of Ninja 亡命忍者	Chan Ming Fu	
1983	Chinese Magic 中國法術		
1983	Fantasy Mission Force 迷你特攻隊	Nazi officer	
1983	Dressed to Fire 鄉下阿郎		
1983	Swordsman Adventure 玉劍留香		
1985	Clash of the Professionals 闖將		
1985	Mob Busters 惡漢笑擊隊		
1989	After the Midnight 午夜過後		
1990	Forbidden Imperial Tales 嫁到宮裡的男人	Lee Lin Ying 李蓮英	
1993	Flying Dagger 神經刀與飛天貓	Dicky Lui 曹員外	
1994	Urban Cop 特警神龍		
1996	How to Meet the Lucky Stars 運財五福星	Supreme of Gamblers 睹尊	
1997	Against 終極火線		
1997	Got No Choice 赤色玫瑰		
2007	Kung Fu Mahjong 3: The Final Duel 雀聖3自摸三百番	Uncle Powell 貓叔	
2008	Hong Kong Bronx 黑勢力	Superintendent Cheung 張警司	

=== Television series ===
Year	Title	Role
1979	One Sword 一剑镇神州	無名客
1995	Fist of Power 南拳北腿	Luk Ah Choi 陸阿采
1996	Dark Tales 聊齋	Yim To Sang 嚴道生; Uncle Shum 沈叔; Wong Yan Kei 王仁騏; Wong Ting 王鼐; Yung Lo Yee 翁老兒
1996	State of Divinity 笑傲江湖	Cho Lang Tan 左冷禪
1997	Legend of YungChing 江湖奇侠传	Kangxi Emperor 康熙帝
1998	Master Ma 馬永貞之爭霸上海灘	Bai Laili 白癩痢
1998	Master Ma II 馬永貞之英雄血	Bai Laili 白癩痢
2003	In the Realm of Fancy 繾綣仙凡間	Pei Shum Yuen 裴沈元
2003	Point of No Return 西關大少	Ng Man Sing 伍晚成
2004	Blade Heart 血薦軒轅	Cheung Sing 張誠
2004	War and Beauty 金枝慾孽	Suen Ching Wah 孫清華
2004	The Conqueror's Story 楚漢驕雄	Hung Pak 項伯
2005	Wong Fei Hung - Master of Kung Fu 我師傅係黃飛鴻	Chiu Pa Shan 趙霸山
2005	Lost in the Chamber of Love 西廂奇緣	Hat Lap Chan 乞立贊
2005	Healing Hands III 妙手仁心III	Tsang Tat Yin 曾達賢
2005	The Charm Beneath 胭脂水粉	Chuk Moon Shan 祝滿山
2006	Welcome to the House 高朋滿座 (2006–2007)	Master Fo 火爺
2006	The Dance of Passion 火舞黃沙	Mau To 茅土
2006	C.I.B. Files 刑事情報科	Chung Kam Yuen 鍾金元 (Albert)
2006	Land of Wealth 滙通天下	Cheung Hau Yue 章孝儒
2006	The Price of Greed 千謊百計	Mau Chun/Ha Hok Kei 茅泰/夏學琪
2007	Life Art 寫意人生	Wong To Ling 黃道齡
2007-2008	Best Selling Secrets 同事三分親 (2007–2008)	Yin Ying Ming 言英明
2007	Heart of Greed 溏心風暴	Chan Kwok Lit 陳國烈
2007	Phoenix Rising 蘭花劫	Sing Bo 成堡
2008-2009	The Gem of Life 珠光寶氣 (2008–2009)	Sung Sai Man 宋世萬 (Phillip)
2008-2010	Off Pedder 畢打自己人 (2008–2010)	Yim Hei 閆器 (Joe)
2010	Fly with Me 飛女正傳	Yung Pak Kui 容伯駒 (Richard)
2011	When Heaven Burns 天與地	Hau Chiu Ping 侯釗平 (George)

== See also ==
- Shaw Brothers Studio
- Cinema of Hong Kong

Awards and achievements
TVB Anniversary Awards
Preceded by Paul Chun for The King of Yesterday and Tomorrow	My Favourite Powerhouse Actor (now named Best Supporting Actor); 2004 for War and Beauty	Succeeded by Ha Yu for My Family (Hong Kong TV series)
