= Love Without End =

Love Without End may refer to:

- Love Without End (1961 film)
- Love Without End (1970 film)

== See also ==
- "Love Without End, Amen", a song recorded by George Strait in 1990
- Endless Love (disambiguation)
