= List of Hong Kong films of 1968 =

A list of films produced in Hong Kong in 1968:.

== 1968 ==
Title	Director	Cast	Genre	Notes
1968
The Admirers of the Girl in Mini-Skirt (aka The Charming Mini-Skirt)	Ng Wui	Wu Fung, Suet Nei, Ho Lan, Teresa Ha Ping, Lai Man, Chan Yee	Comedy	
Always in Your Heart				
Angel Strikes Again	Lo Wei			
The Assassinator	Joe Law Chi			
The Avenging Sword	Ling Yun			
Be My Love (Winter Love)	Chu Yuan			
Beauty in the Mist				
The Bells of Death	Griffin Yueh Feng			
Black Butterfly	Lo Wei	Chan Hung Lit		
Blondie				
The Blossoming Rose (aka The Forsaken Love, Youth Rose)	Chiang Wai-Kwong	Connie Chan, Wu Fung, Adam Cheng, Sum Chi-Wah, Seung-Goon Yuk, Yung Yuk-Yi, Lai Man, Alice Au Yin-Ching, Hui Ying-Ying, Pak Ming, Cheung Yuen-Yuen	Musical	
Blossoming Season	Luk Bong	Josephine Siao Fong-Fong		
Blue Falcon (aka Blue Eagle)	Wong Fung	Josephine Siao Fong-Fong, Adam Cheng, Teresa Ha, Sum Chi-Wah	Action	
Dangerous Seventeen	Chiang Wai-Kwong	Wu Fung, Lee Kwan-Yee, Adam Cheng, Margaret Tu Chuan, Yu Mei-Wah, Lee Kit-Ying, Pak Fung-Sin	Romance Drama	
Double Trouble	Sit Kwan	Pang Pang, Lee Kwan, Margaret Hsing Hui	Comedy	
Fan Lei-Fa, the Female General (aka Fan Li-Fa, The Story of Heroine Fan Lei-fa)	Fung Chi-Kong	Connie Chan Po-Chu, Yu Kai, Tam Lan-Hing	Cantonese opera	
The Fastest Sword	Pan Lei			
The Feats of Fong Sai-Yuk	Fung Chi-Kong	Petrina Fung Bo-Bo, Sum Chi-Wah, Adam Cheng, Margaret Tu Chuan, Yung Yuk-Yi	Martial Arts	
Gold Rush Madness (aka Rush for Gold)	Chan Cheuk-Sang	Sun-Ma Sze-Tsang, Lee Hung, Mang Lee	Comedy	
Hong Kong Rhapsody	Umetsugu Inoue	Li Ching, Peter Chen Ho, Alison Chang Yen, Chan Hung-lit, Angela Yu Chien, Helen Ma Hoi-Lun, Lily Ho, Margaret Hsing Hui	Musical	
The Land of Many Perfumes				
The Magic Bow	Ng Wui	Suet Nei, Kenneth Tsang Kong, Cheung Yee, Tina Ti Na, Fong Wah, Gam Lui, Wong Hak, Fung Ging-Man, Tang Ti, Lai Man, Lam Tin, Hsia Fan	Martial Arts	
Red Lamp Shaded in Blood (aka The Lantern of Death)	Wong Fung	Connie Chan Po-Chu, Nancy Sit Ka-Yin, Adam Cheng, Sum Chi-Wah, Teresa Ha, Ma Chiu-Chi	Martial Arts	
The White Dragon	Wong Fung	Petrina Fung Bo-Bo, Lee Hung, Cheung Ying-Tsoi, Paul Chu Kong, Cheng Kwun-Min, Lai Cheuk-Cheuk	Martial arts	
