= Endless Love =

Endless Love may refer to:

== Film ==
- Endless Love (1981 film), directed by Franco Zeffirelli, based on the novel
- Endless Love (2014 American film), remake of the 1981 film, directed by Shana Feste
- Endless Love (2014 Burmese film), directed by Thein Han
- C'est la vie, mon chéri, English title Endless Love, a 1993 Hong Kong romantic film

== Television ==
- Endless Love (2000 TV series), a set of 4 South Korean dramas
- Endless Love (2010 TV series), a Philippine drama adaptation of the Korean drama Autumn in My Heart
- Endless Love (2014 TV series), a South Korean television series
- Endless Love (2015 TV series) (Kara Sevda), a Turkish television drama
- Endless Love (2019 TV series), a Thai television series

== Literature ==
- Endless Love, a novel by Scott Spencer

== Music ==
- Endless Love (1981 soundtrack), soundtrack album of the 1981 film
  - "Endless Love" (song), theme for 1981 film, recorded by Lionel Richie and Diana Ross,covered by Luther Vandross and Mariah Carey
- Endless Love (2014 soundtrack), soundtrack album of the 2014 film
- "Endless Love", theme song of the 2005 film The Myth, performed by Jackie Chan and Kim Hee-sun
- "Endless Love", a 2006 song by German singer Jeanette from the album Naked Truth
- Endless Love, 2014 album by Norwegian singer Sivert Høyem
- Endless Love, album by Indian singer Pankaj Udhas
