= Endless Love (2014 soundtrack) =

2014 film soundtrack album

Endless Love (Original Motion Picture Soundtrack)

Soundtrack album by Christophe Beck
- Released: February 11, 2014
- Genres: Pop; rock; hip hop; R&B; indie rock; indie pop; alternative rock
- Length: 54:37
- Label: Warner Bros.

Endless Love (Original Motion Picture Soundtrack) is the soundtrack album to the 2014 romantic drama film Endless Love directed by Shana Feste starring Alex Pettyfer and Gabriella Wilde. It is the second adaptation of Scott Spencer's novel following the 1981 film of the same name starring Brooke Shields. The soundtrack, by Christophe Beck, featured 14 songs performed by a variety of artists, which was released through Warner Bros. Records on February 11, 2014.

== Background ==
The original score for Endless Love was composed by Christophe Beck who previously worked with Shana Feste on The Greatest (2009). Endless Love featured popular songs performed by the band NoNoNo, The Bird and the Bee, Guards, Tanlines, Cults, Franz Ferdinand, Lord Huron, Echosmith, Drop City Yacht Club amongst others. The end credits song "Don't Find Antoher Love" is performed by Tegan and Sara and written by Julie Frost.

Though not being included in the soundtrack, Robert Palmer's "Addicted to Love" and "Explosions" by Ellie Goulding were used in the trailers and television commercials for the film. Initially, Feste wanted to use the original film's theme song performed by Lionel Richie and Diana Ross, but decided against it, as it would become too metafilmic and wanted to avoid any callbacks or connections to that film, in order to have a distinct identity.

The Bird and the Bee performed the new title track "All Our Endless Love" featuring Matt Berninger from the National. It was released as a single on January 28, 2014, along with "Don't Find Another Love". The soundtrack released through Warner Bros. Records on February 11, 2014.

== Reception ==
Calling it a "dream playlist", Kristen Harris of Seventeen said "if the incredible tracks on the album are any indication of how stellar the movie is going to be, our excitement just got even more out of control." Betsy Sharkey of Los Angeles Times said that the film's "moody indie-pop soundtrack [is] saturated with tunes that tell the story as often as the dialogue". Emily Miller of Albion Pleaid wrote "The real standout of the film, though, was the soundtrack. It was well-put together with exciting and new artists and beautifully written love songs. I found myself throughout the film paying more and more attention to the soundtrack, a personal favorite of mine is the song "Don't Find Another Love" by the sister-duo Teagan And Sara. Other tracks from the album include artists like Franz Ferdinand with "Right Action" and The Tallest Man on Earth's cut "Leading Me Now"."

== Track listing ==
No.	Title	Artist(s)	Length
1.	"Pumpin Blood"	NoNoNo	3:29
2.	"Don't Find Another Love"	Tegan and Sara	3:17
3.	"All Our Endless Love"	The Bird and the Bee featuring Matt Berninger	3:57
4.	"I Know It's You"	Guards	5:00
5.	"All Of Me"	Tanlines	3:51
6.	"Go Outside"	Cults	3:25
7.	"Right Action"	Franz Ferdinand	3:03
8.	"Crickets"	Drop City Yacht Club	4:09
9.	"Peaches"	In the Valley Below	4:45
10.	"Leading Me Now"	The Tallest Man on Earth	3:25
11.	"Surround You"	Echosmith	3:28
12.	"Ends of the Earth"	Lord Huron	4:46
13.	"Endless Love Suite"	Christophe Beck	4:07
Total length:			50:42

Bonus track
No.	Title	Artist(s)	Length
14.	"Pumpin Blood" (The Jane Doze Remix)	NoNoNo	3:55
Total length:			54:37

== Charts ==
Chart (2014)	Peak position
US Top Soundtracks (Billboard)	11

== See also ==
- Endless Love (1981 soundtrack)
