= Margaret Tu Chuan =

Hong Kong actress

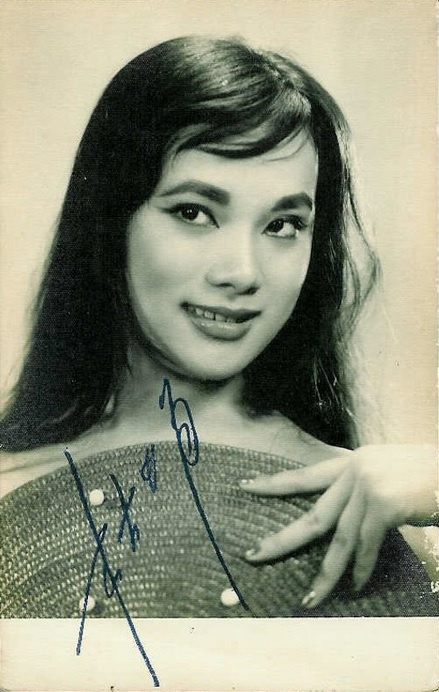
- Born: Peng Xiao Ping (彭小萍); November 12, 1942
- Died: November 30, 1969 (aged 27)
- Occupation: Actress

Margaret Tu Chuan (Chinese: 杜娟; pinyin: Dù Juān; November 12, 1942 - November 30, 1969, aged 27), born Peng Xiao Ping (彭小萍), was a Hong Kong actress.

== Career ==
She made her first film, The Magic Touch, in 1958. The film was directed by Li Han Hsiang who discovered her at age seventeen. She starred in movies such as When the Peach Blossoms Bloom (1959), The Kingdom and the Beauty (1959) and Madam White Snake (1962) with Betty Loh Ti and Lin Dai before her death in 1969. Diary of A Lady-Killer (1969) was the last role she starred in before committing suicide by taking an overdose of sleeping pills with a female lover after a failed marriage. Both women left notes asking that they be buried together, but this was not done. She was 27 years old. This suicide was part of an "epidemic" that decimated female Mandarin-cinema stars (Ting Hao, Linda Lin Dai, Betty Loh Ti) at the time.

== Filmography ==
- Diary of a Lady-Killer (1969)
- Yan yang tian (1967) .... Hong Ling
- The Black Falcon (1967) .... Hu Mei
- Te jing 009 (1964)
- Bian cheng san xia (1966) .... Chieh Ying
- Hu xia jian chou (1966) .... Hsiao Ching
- Shan ge yin yuan (1965) .... Sung Yu-lan
- The Black Forest (1964) .... Meidana
- Between Tears and Smiles (1964)
- Di er chun (1963)
- Her Sister's Keeper (Hong Kong: English title)
- Miao ren miao shi (1962)
- Madam White Snake (1962) (as Tu Chuan) .... Qingqing (Green Snake)
- The Dream of the Red Chamber (1962)
- Shou qiang (1961)
- Shen xian lao hu gou (1961) .... Sun Man-li
- Ge qiang yan shi (1961)
- Mang mu de ai qing (1961) .... Lu Lu-chi
- Oh Boys! Oh Girls! (1961)
- Jie da huan xi (1961)
- When the Peach Blossoms Bloom (1960) (as Juan Du)
- The Secret of Miss Pai (1960)
- How to Marry a Millionaire (1960) (Hong Kong: English title)
- The Malayan Affair (1960)
- Twilight Hours (1960)
- Spring Song (1959) (as Xiaoping Peng)
- Hou men (1959)
- Kingdom and the Beauty (1959) .... Village Girl
- Miao shou hui chun (1958)
