= Huang Tsung-hsing =

Chinese actor

Huang Chung-hsin
- 黃宗迅
- Born: May 27, 1920; Hebei, China
- Died: October 28, 1976 (aged 56); British Hong Kong
- Occupation: Actor
- Spouse: Chiao Chiao (m. 1963–1976)
- Children: 1 son

Chinese name
- Traditional Chinese: 黃宗迅
- Simplified Chinese: 黃宗迅
Transcriptions
Standard Mandarin
- Hanyu Pinyin: Huáng Zōngxùn

Huang Tsung-hsing (also known as Huang Chung-hsin; May 27, 1920 – October 28, 1976) was a Chinese Hong Kong actor. He appeared in two films with superstar Bruce Lee: Fist of Fury as Cook Tien and The Way of The Dragon as Uncle Wang. Huang married actress Lisa Chiao Chiao. Huang also acted with fighting instructor Han Ying-chieh in Fist of Fury. Huang also acted in 70 other movies, many of them about martial arts.

== Early life ==
Huang was born on May 27, 1920, in Hebei, China.

== Marriage and death ==
He was married once to Taiwanese actress Lisa Chiao Chiao in 1963 and had a son, but they separated a few years later. In 1966, Huang got into a car accident and Chiao moved to Hong Kong to look after him. On October 28, 1976, while riding his motorbike in Taiwan, he got into a second car accident and died from his injuries. He was 56 years old.

== Partial filmography ==
- 1951: E meng chu xing - Reporter
- 1955: Mei gang chun hui
- 1956: Guan shan xing
- 1958: Feng liu yuan jia
- 1958: Chang feng wan li
- 1959: Pen huo nu lang - Fang Donghai
- 1959: Mo ter zhi lian
- 1960: Dao guang jian ying
- 1960: Cui gang yu xie ji
- 1962: Yi shi yi jia
- 1963: Ama no kaishinju
- 1963: You xia yi quan - Hei Tien Lung
- 1963: Hei ye dao li ming
- 1964: Lovers' Rock
- 1965: Song of Orchid Island - Witch doctor Barda
- 1966: Downhill They Ride
- 1966: Du mei gui - Li San
- 1967: Die wang jiao wa - Hung Ying
- 1967: The King with My Face - Wen Tsu-yuan
- 1967: One-Armed Swordsman - Wei Hsuan
- 1967: Ru xia - Yin Shih-yuan
- 1967: Summons to Death
- 1967: Qi xia wu yi - Hsu Ching
- 1967: The Assassin - Premier Han Kuei
- 1968: Guai xia - Chiang Tan Feng
- 1968: Yu mian fei hu
- 1968: The Sword of Swords - Shang Kwan-wu
- 1968: Yun ni - Dr. Chiu Tung-Wang
- 1968: Divorce, Hong Kong Style
- 1968: Bayangan ajal
- 1969: Dragon Swamp
- 1969: Yan niang - Li Fei-lung, Escort Service Chief
- 1969: The Golden Sword - Steward Peng (after)
- 1970: Shi er jin pai - Lei Ting
- 1970: Sha ji
- 1970: Lady of Steel - Han Shixiong aka Cai Yi
- 1970: Jiang hu san nu xia - Chung Pa-tien
- 1970: Wu lin feng yun - Fierce Tiger
- 1970: Tie luo han - Hsiao Tien Tsun
- 1970: Love Without End - Sun Jing-sheng
- 1971: Gui tai jian
- 1971: Jin yin chou
- 1971: Nu sha shou
- 1971: Vengeance of a Snowgirl - Ko Hung
- 1971: Lei ru fung - Li Yuen-wei
- 1972: Lin Chong ye ben
- 1972: Fist of Fury - Tien
- 1972: Wu hu cui hua
- 1972: The Way of the Dragon - 'Uncle' Wang (as Wang Chung Hsin)
- 1972: The 14 Amazons - Meng Huai Yuan, Yang's General (as Huang Chung Hsing)
- 1972: Bronze Head and Steel Arm
- 1972: Da nei gao shou
- 1972: Qing bian
- 1973: Back Alley Princess
- 1973: Chinese Hercules - Uncle Lo (as Chung Tsung Wang)
- 1973: Dragons of Death
- 1973: Inspector Karate
- 1973: Meng han - Master Luk Kai
- 1974: The Mandarin Magician
- 1974: E hu cun
- 1976: The Eternal Obsession - (final film role)
