= Rhythm of the Wave =

1974 film by Li Hsing

- Film poster
- Directed by: Li Hsing
- Screenplay by: Chang Yung-hsiang
- Produced by: Ho Yu-ye
- Starring: Josephine Siao; Chin Han; Jenny Hu; Ko Chun-hsiung
- Cinematography: Lai Cheng-ying
- Edited by: Yang Po-Yung
- Music by: Tso Hung-yuan
- Production company: Cine Art Film Company
- Distributed by: Cine Art Film Company
- Release date: 1974 (Taiwan)
- Running time: 90 minutes
- Country: Taiwan
- Language: Mandarin

Rhythm of the Wave (simplified Chinese: 海韵; traditional Chinese: 海韻; pinyin: Hǎi Yùn) is a Taiwanese film spoken in Mandarin, first released in 1974 by Cine Art Film Company (文藝影業公司).

== Cast ==
- Josephine Siao
- Chin Han
- Jenny Hu
- Ko Chun-hsiung

== Soundtrack ==
Rhythm of the Wave (海韻; Hǎi Yùn) is a soundtrack album, released in 1974 by Lee Fung Records (丽风唱片). Unless otherwise noted, tracks are sung in the film by Teresa Teng, music is arranged by Lin Chia Ching (林家慶), lyrics are written by Chuang Nu (莊奴), and songs are composed by Ku Yue (古月).

Side A

1. "Hai yun" (海韻) – Main theme
  Re-recorded by Polydor Records for the 1977 compilation Greatest Hits by Teresa Teng
2. "Remember You, Remember Me" (記得你記得我 "Jide ni jide wo") – Sub-theme
3. "Hey! I Tell You" (嗨! 我告訴你 "Hai! Wo gaosu ni") – Sub-theme
4. "Warmth" (溫暖 "Wennuan"), sung by Yuanye Sanchong Chang (原野三重唱)
  Sub-theme of the 1974 film Where the Seagull Flies (海鷗飛處)
5. "First Love (keyboard instrumental)" (初戀 電子琴演奏 "Chulian–dianziqin yanzou")

Side B

1. "Hey! I Tell You" (嗨! 我告訴你 "Hai! Wo gaosu ni") – Sub-theme, rendered by Wan Sha-lang (萬沙浪)
2. "Three Dreams" (三個夢 "San ge meng") – Sub-theme
3. "First Love" (初戀) – Sub-theme, sung by Yuanye Sanchong Chang (原野三重唱)
4. "Cherish the Flowers" (愛惜花) – Sub-theme
5. "Hai yun (violin instrumental)" (海韻 小提琴演奏 "Hai yun–xiaotiqin yanzou")
