= Kō Nakahira =

Japanese film director

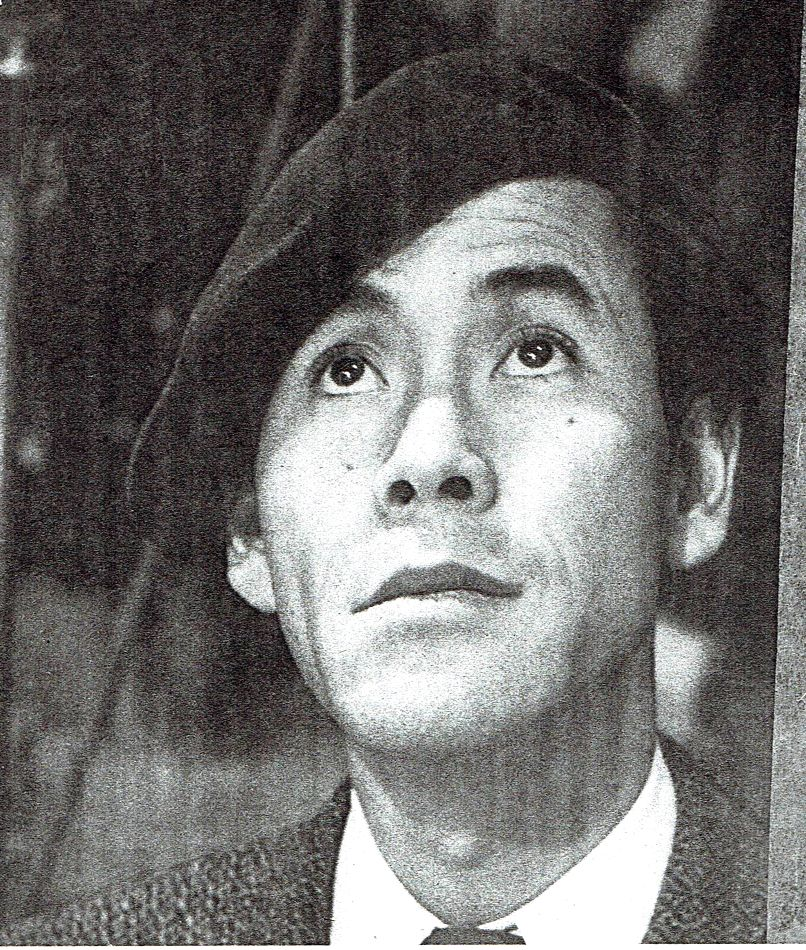
Kō Nakahira

Kō Nakahira (中平康, Nakahira Kō; January 3, 1926- September 11, 1978) was a Japanese film director.

== Career ==
After dropping out of the University of Tokyo in 1949, Nakahira joined Shochiku as an assistant director. As assistant director, he worked for such filmmakers as Akira Kurosawa, Eisuke Takizawa, Keisuke Kinoshita and Yuzo Kawashima. In 1954, he moved to Nikkatsu. Two years later, while at Nikkatsu, he co-directed his first feature with Koreyoshi Kurahara, a 1956 noir film entitled The Shadow of Fear (Nerawareta otoko). That same year, he made his solo directorial debut with the film Crazed Fruit (Kurutta kajitsu). Though Crazed Fruit was technically Nakahira's second feature, it was released first, as the immediate success of Yūjirō Ishihara's film Season of the Sun encouraged Nikkatsu to swap the release dates of The Shadow of Fear and Crazed Fruit.

Nakahira would go on to direct 48 films between 1956 and 1976, before dying on September 11, 1978. His 1971 film A Soul to Devils (Yami no naka no chimimoryo) was nominated for the Palme d'Or at the Cannes Film Festival.

He was known for his foundational, and frequently controversial, Sun Tribe (Taiyōzoku) films in the 1950s and 1960s, as well as his late 1960s collaborations with the Shaw brothers and his independent period of the 1970s. Nakahira's body of work spanned multiple genres, including noirs, thrillers, comedies, exploitation films, erotic dramas, gambling movies, girl gang films and spy parodies. His films were noted for their tight pacing, modernist visual flair and experiments with narrative and cinematic form, as well as Nakahira's ability to produce them quickly. Among his thematic preoccupations were the changing role of women in Japanese society, evolving standards of sexual ethics, the rejection of tradition among Japan's disaffected countercultural youth, infidelity and the dark side of human sexual desire.

== Filmography as assistant director ==
- Ojōsan shachō (お嬢さん社長 lit. Madame Company President, 1953) (dir. Yuzo Kawashima)
- The Path of Sincerity (真実一路 Shinjitsu ichiro, 1954) (dir. Yuzo Kawashima)
- Jigoku no kengô Hirate Miki (地獄の剣豪: 平手造酒 lit. Hirate Miki the Swordman, 1954) (dir. Eisuke Takizawa)

== Filmography ==
List of films as director.

- Crazed Fruit, aka Juvenile Jungle (狂った果実 Kurutta kajitsu, 1956)
- The Shadow of Fear (狙われた男 Nerawareta otoko, 1956) (co-directed with Koreyoshi Kurahara)
- Frankie the Milkman (牛乳屋フランキー Gyûnyû ya Furankî, 1956)
- Shu to midori: Zenpen shu no maki: Kôhen midori no maki (1956)
- Summer Storm (夏の嵐 Natsu no arashi, 1956)
- Bitoku no yoromeki (美徳のよろめき The Flesh is Weak or Misstepping of Virtue, 1957) – Based on a Yukio Mishima novel.
- Streetlights (街燈 Gaitô or Koi to uwaki no seishun techô: Gaitô, 1957)
- Temptation (誘惑 Yûwaku, 1957)
- Who's the Real Killer? or Who is the True Murderer? (殺したのは誰だ Koroshita no wa dare da, 1957)
- Kurenai no Tsubasa (紅の翼 Crimson Wings, 1958) – One of the biggest Japanese box office successes of the 1950s.
- The Seasons of Love, aka Four Seasons of Love (四季の愛欲 Shiki no aiyoku, 1958)
- A Secret Rendezvous, aka The Assignation (密会 Mikkai, 1959)
- Break Down that Wall, aka Tear Down Those Walls (その壁を砕け Sono kabe o kudake, 1959) (written by Kaneto Shindo)
- Saijo Katagi or Saijo kishitsu (才女気質 Talented Woman or Talented Woman Temperament, 1959)
- The Inspector and the Gambler, aka The Girls and the Students (学生野郎と娘たち Kyanpasu hyakutôban yori: Gakusei yarô to musume tachi, 1960)
- The Jungle Block (地図のない町 Chizu no nai machi, 1960)
- Wait for Tomorrow (あした晴れるか Ashita hareru ka, 1960)
- That Guy and I (あいつと私 Aitsu to watashi, 1961) – Based on a novel by Yojiro Ishizaka. A portrait of youth grappling with new forms of love and sexual ethics at the height of the Anpo protests, the film was marketed as Yujiro Ishihara's comeback picture after he injured himself in a skiing accident, and went on to break Japanese box office records.
- The Storm Over Arabia, aka The Arab Storm (アラブの嵐 Arabu no arashi, 1961) – An Egyptian-Japanese co-production starring Yūjirō Ishihara, Hassan Youssef, Kamal el-Shennawi and Shadia. An Egyptian version was released in 1963, titled On the Banks of the Nile, aka Ala defaf el Nil, Ala difaf in-Nil or Ealaa difaf Al-Nayl (على ضفاف النيل).
- Danger Pays (危いことなら銭になる Yabai koto nara zeni ni naru, 1962)
- The Lucky General (当りや大将 Atariya taisho, 1962)
- The Young and Bad, aka The Young, the Bad and the Strange (若くて悪くて凄いこいつら Wakakute warukute sugoi koitsura, 1962)
- Bright Sea (光る海 Hikaru umi, 1963)
- I Have the Sun in My Back (俺の背中に陽が当る Ore no senaka ni hi ga ataru, 1963)
- Modern Children (現代っ子 Gendaikko, 1963)
- The Mud-Spattered Pure Heart, aka Mud Spattered Purity (泥だらけの純情 Dorodarake no junjō, 1963)
- Whirlpool of Flesh or Whirlpool of Women (おんなの渦と淵と流れ Onna no uzu to fuchi to nagare, 1964)
- Only on Mondays (月曜日のユカ Getsuyōbi no Yuka, 1964)
- Flora on the Sand, aka Plants from the Dunes, aka Jungle Interlude (砂の上の植物群 Suna no ue no shokubutsu-gun, 1964)
- The Hunter's Diary (猟人日記 Ryojin nikki, 1964)
- Bastards Without Borders (野郎に国境はない Yarô ni kokkyô wa nai, 1965)
- The Black Gambler (黒い賭博師 Kuroi tobakushi, 1965) – Sixth installment of Nikkatsu's Gambler series starring Akira Kobayashi.
- Gendai akutô jingi (1965)
- The Passionate Spinster (結婚相談 Kekkon sôdan, 1965)
- Red Glass (赤いグラス Akai gurasu, 1966)
- The Black Gambler: Left Hand of the Devil (黒い賭博師: 悪魔の左手 Kuroi tobakushi: Akuma no hidarite, 1966) – Seventh installment of Nikkatsu's Gambler series starring Akira Kobayashi.
- Inter-Pol (特警零零九 Te jing 009, 1967)
- Kigeki Furoshiki (1967)
- Trapeze Girl (飛天女郎 Fei tian nu lang or Hiten joro, 1967)
- The Spiders’ The Noisy Parade (ザ・スパイダースの大進撃 The spiders no dai-shingeki, 1968) – A film inspired by the Beatles' Help!, starring Japanese band The Spiders. Nikkatsu fired Nakahira shortly after production wrapped due to his drinking on set. Thereafter he went independent and, in 1971, founded his own production company, Nakahira Productions.
- Summer Heat (狂戀時 Kuang lian shi, 1968 Hong Kong remake of Nakahira's own Crazed Fruit)
- Diary of a Lady-Killer (獵人 Lie ren, 1969 Hong Kong remake of Nakahira's own The Hunter's Diary)
- Rebel Against Glory (栄光への反逆, 1970)
- A Crash Landing of Youth (1971) – A South Korean production.
- A Soul to Devils, aka Chimimoryo: A Soul of Demons, aka Evil Spirits in the Darkness (闇の中の魑魅魍魎 Yami no naka no chimimoryo, 1971) – Nominated for the Palme d'Or at the 1971 Cannes Film Festival.
- Rika: The Mixed-Blood Girl (混血児リカ Konketsuji Rica, 1972)
- Rika 2: Lonely Wanderer (混血児リカ ひとりゆくさすらい旅 Konketsuji Rica: Hitoriyuku sasuraitabi, 1973)
- Variation, aka Melody of Love (変奏曲 Hensôkyoku, 1976) – Shot in France and produced by the Art Theatre Guild.

Nakahira had planned to direct Kah-chan as his first film, but this was never realized. The film would eventually be made by Kon Ichikawa in 2001.

== Personal life ==
Originally, Nakahira was named Koh Nakahira. He inherited his surname from his mother. Nakahira's Chinese name was Yeung Shu-Hei (楊樹希).

Nakahira was born on January 3, 1926 in Takinogawa Ward, Tokyo. His father, Toranosuke Takahashi, was an oil painter, and his grandmother had graduated from a music school and taught violin. Thus he grew up in a family that encouraged him to become an artist.

He became enthusiastic about film as a junior high school student upon seeing the works of René Clair and Billy Wilder. In 1948, Nakahira enrolled in the Department of Art of The Faculty of Letters, University of Tokyo, but he dropped out the next year to become an assistant director at Shochiku.

Nakahira was an alcoholic. On September 11, 1978, he died of stomach cancer at the age of 52.
