= The Kingdom and the Beauty =

1959 Hong Kong film by Li Han-hsiang

- Theatrical release poster
- Directed by: Li Han-hsiang
- Written by: Wong Yuet-Ting
- Produced by: Run Run Shaw
- Starring: Lin Dai; Zhao Lei
- Cinematography: Albert Yang Chun
- Edited by: Chiang Hsing-Lung
- Music by: Wang Shun
- Production company: Shaw Brothers Studio
- Release date: 29 June 1959 (Hong Kong)
- Running time: 100 minutes
- Country: Hong Kong
- Language: Mandarin

The Kingdom and the Beauty (Chinese: 江山美人; pinyin: Jiang shan mei ren) is a 1959 Hong Kong musical-drama film directed by Li Han-hsiang. The film was set in Imperial China, directed by a Hong Kong based–Mainland Chinese director and produced by the famed Hong Kong Shaw Brothers film studio. Although there was minimal Singaporean input in the film-making, the film was selected as the Singaporean entry for the Best Foreign Language Film at the 32nd Academy Awards, but was not nominated.

== Cast ==
- Siu Loi Chow
- Lin Dai as Li Feng
- Li Jen Ho
- Bo Hong as Liu Jin
- Wei Hong as Li's sister-in-law
- King Hu as Ta Niu
- Jing Ting (singing voice)
- Wei Lieh Lan
- Lam Ma as Chou Yung
- Rhoqing Tang as Dowager Empress
- Margaret Tu Chuan as Village Girl
- Yuanlong Wang as Liang Chu
- Chih-Ching Yang as Li's brother
- Zhao Lei as Emperor Chu Te Cheng

== See also ==
- List of submissions to the 32nd Academy Awards for Best Foreign Language Film
- List of Singaporean submissions for the Academy Award for Best Foreign Language Film
- Chinese Odyssey 2002, a 2002 film which spoofs this film
