= A Cause to Kill =

1970 Hong Kong film by Murayama Mitsuo

- Film poster
- Directed by: Mitsuo Murayama
- Written by: Doe Ching
- Produced by: Runme Shaw
- Starring: Chiao Chiao; Chin Chun; Ha Wai; Ho Pak-Kwong; Huang Tsung-hsing
- Cinematography: Tadashi Nishimoto
- Edited by: Chiang Hsing-Lung
- Music by: Wang Fu-Ling
- Distributed by: Shaw Brothers; Celestial Pictures
- Release date: 15 January 1970 (Hong Kong)
- Running time: 98 minutes
- Country: Hong Kong
- Language: Mandarin

A Cause to Kill (Chinese: 殺機) is a 1970 Hong Kong Shaw Brothers thriller film directed by Mitsuo Murayama.

== Cast ==
- Chiao Chiao - Su Su
- Chin Chun
- Ha Wai
- Ho Pak-Kwong
- Huang Tsung-hsing
- Kwan Shan - Chang Li De
- Ivy Ling Po - Sin Lei
- Tsang Choh Lam
