= 7th Golden Horse Awards =

1969 Taiwan film awards ceremony

- Date: October 30, 1969
- Site: Zhongshan Hall, Taipei, Taiwan
- Hosted by: Chung Chiao-kuang
- Organized by: Taipei Golden Horse Film Festival Executive Committee

Highlights
- Best Feature Film: Spring in a Small Town
- Best Director: Pai Ching-jui; The Bride and I
- Best Actor: Peter Yang; Storm Over the Yangtze River
- Best Actress: Li Li-hua; Storm Over the Yangtze River
- Most awards: Spring in a Small Town (4); Storm Over the Yangtze River (4)

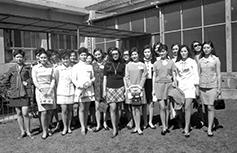

The 7th Golden Horse Awards (Chinese: 第7屆金馬獎) took place on October 30, 1969 at Zhongshan Hall in Taipei, Taiwan.

== Winners and nominees ==
Winners are listed first, highlighted in boldface.

**Best Feature Film**: **Spring in a Small Town**; Storm Over the Yangtze River (runner-up); The Bride and I (runner-up); Susanna (runner-up)	**Best Documentary**: **Zhang Daqian's Painting**; Guang Hua Yan Xi (runner-up); Lungching Township (runner-up)
**Best News Film**: **Cinema News No. 644**; Story of Yang Chuan-kwang (runner-up)	**Best Director**: **Pai Ching-jui — The Bride and I**
**Best Leading Actor**: **Peter Yang — Storm Over the Yangtze River**	**Best Leading Actress**: **Li Li-hua — Storm Over the Yangtze River**
**Best Supporting Actor**: **Sun Yueh — Storm Over the Yangtze River**	**Best Supporting Actress**: **Chang Ping-yu — Spring in a Small Town**
**Best Child Star**: **Wu Feng-huang — Lovers Flee**	**Best Screenplay**: **Wu Huan — Spring in a Small Town**
**Best Cinematography - Color**: **Cheng Chieh — Spring in a Small Town**	**Best Film Editing**: **Wang Chin-chen — The Bride and I**
**Best Art Direction**: **Yeh Ying-jin and Chang Kuo-hsiung — Moonlit Villa**	**Best Music**: **Chow Lan-ping — The Boat Girl**
**Best Sound Recording**: **Wang Yung-hua — Susanna**	**Best Cinematography for Documentary**: **Chi Ho-hsi — Zhang Daqian's Painting**
**Best Planning for Documentary**: **Yang Wen-kan — Lungching Township**	**Best Cinematography for News Film**: **Wu Kuang-chang et al. — Cinema News No. 648**
**Best Writing and Directing for News Film**: **Huang Chia-yen — Cinema News No. 644**	**Special Awards**: **Tung Yueh-chuan**; **Chao Tse-hsiu**; **Tien Peng**; **Ching Li**
