= Summer Heat (1968 film) =

1968 Hong Kong film by Kō Nakahira

- poster
- Traditional Chinese: 狂戀詩
- Simplified Chinese: 狂恋诗
- Hanyu Pinyin: Kuángliàn Shī
- Directed by: Kō Nakahira (Yeung Shu-Hei)
- Produced by: Run Run Shaw
- Starring: Jenny Hu; Chin Han; Yang Fan; Chin Feng
- Cinematography: Tadashi Nishimoto
- Edited by: Chiang Hsing-lung
- Music by: Wang Fu-ling
- Release date: 1968
- Country: Hong Kong

Summer Heat is a 1968 Hong Kong film directed by the Japanese director Kō Nakahira (credited by his Chinese name Yeung Shu-Hei) and produced by Shaw Brothers Studio.

== Plot ==
Judy, a seductive woman, has three men in her life, a husband, a playboy and an intellectual. Two of the men are brothers which leads to fatal consequences.

== Cast ==
- Jenny Hu - Judy
- Chin Han - David Zhu
- Yang Fang - Zhu Xiao Chun
- Chin Feng - Peter Jiang
- Ma Siu-Ying - David's mother
- Woo Tung - David's father
- Wu Yen - Maid Huang
- Lee Sau-Kei - Judy's husband
- Chieh Yuen - Peter's buddy
- Siu Lam-Wun - Peter's buddy
- Law Hon - Peter's buddy
- King Pai-Chien - Filling station boss
- To Wing-Leung - Filling station worker
- Someno Yukio - Hunter Bowling Team member
- Yue Man-Wah - Club waiter
- Luk Chuen - Hunter Bowling Team member
