= Jenny Hu =

Hong Kong actress (born 1945)

- 胡燕妮
- Born: 17 November 1945 (age 80); Kaiping, Guangdong, China
- Other name: Jenny Hu Yan-Ni
- Occupation: Actress
- Notable work: cinema films in the 1960s/1970s
- Spouse: Kang Wei (m. 1966)
- Children: 2, including Terence Yin

Jenny Hu (Chinese: 胡燕妮; pinyin: Hú Yànnī; born 17 November 1945), is a Chinese actress best known for her leads in Hong Kong cinema films throughout the 1960s and early 1970s.

== Early life ==
Hu was born to a Chinese father and a German-Hong Kong mother on November 17, 1945, in China. After her Chinese Cantonese father's death her mother took her to Germany where she attended high school. After high school, she moved to Hong Kong and - at the urging of one of her friends - was introduced to famous director Chin Chien who immediately invited Jenny to star in his Shaw Brothers film Till The End Of Time. The film was an overnight success and so was Jenny as she next appeared in a string of successful dramas such as Madam Slender Plum and Four Sisters.

== Career ==
With Hu's stunning looks, she appealed to the Chinese community and she became an instant hit. Hu was a popular movie actress and her films were translated into Standard Chinese. Bruce Lee's martial arts caused Shaw management to focus on action-filled movies as the box office sales were way better.

In 1966, Hu made her debut in the film Till the End of Time (何日君再來). Hu was actively acting until she was about 30.

In 2004, Hu appeared in Yesterday Once More (2004), by Hong Kong filmmaker Johnnie To.

== Personal life ==
In 1966, Hu secretly married Kang Wei. In 1969, Hu moved to Taiwan. They have two sons. In 1983, Hu and her family moved to Los Angeles, California.

Her son, Terence Yin (尹子維), is also in the film industry.

== Filmography ==
- 1966 Till the End of Time (何日君再來)
- 1967 Madame Slender Plum (慾海情魔)
- 1967 Black Falcon (黑鷹)
- 1967 Four Sisters
- 1968 Summer Heat - Judy
- 1969 Torrent of Desire
- 1969 Farewell, My Love
- 1969 River of Tears
- 1970 Young Lovers
- 1970 Love Without End
- 1970 Guess who Killed My Twelve Lovers (噴火美人魚)
- 1971 The Wedding Song
- 1961 My Beloved
- 1971 Maria - Maria
- 1971 Secret of My Millionaire Sister
- 1972 Love Affairs
- 1972 Cheating Panorama
- 1972 Impetuous Fire
- 1972 The Peeper, the Model and the Hypnotist
- 1972 The Notorious Ones
- 1972 Love is Smoke
- 1972 Jenny and Her Sexy Mother
- 1972 The Stealing Love
- 1972 Hong Kong Criminal Crimes
- 1973 Back Street
- 1973 My Love, My Sin
- 1973 Death Comes in Three
- 1974 Wild as the Waves
- 1974 The Paradise
- 1974 Rhythm of the Wave
- 1974 Young Passion
- 1974 The Silver Band
- 1975 I & O
- 1975 Bar Girl
- 1976 Love of Strange Talk
- 1978 To Love Or Not To Love
- 1979 How Big! How Big!
- 1981 Daughter and Father
- 2004 Yesterday Once More
