= Chiao Chiao =

Taiwanese–Singaporean actress

- 焦姣
- Born: Chiao Li-na; 6 March 1943 (age 83); Chongqing, China
- Other name: Lisa Chiao Chiao
- Citizenship: Singapore
- Occupation: Film actress
- Years active: 1964–present
- Spouses: Huang Tsung-hsing (m. 1963; died 1976) Kenneth Tsang (m. 1994; died 2022)
- Children: 1 son

Lisa Chiao Chiao (6 March 1943) is a Taiwanese–Singaporean film actress best known for her work in Hong Kong cinema.

== Background ==
Born in Chongqing, on 6 March 1943, Her family moved to Taiwan in 1949. She took up acting in 1961.

In 1963, Chiao married Huang Tsung-hsing, the following year Huang left for Hong Kong to join the Shaw Brothers Studio while Chiao remained in Taiwan to continue acting.

In 1966 Huang got into a car accident and Chiao moved to Hong Kong to look after him. There Chiao was invited to join the Shaw Brothers Studio, when she acted in the One-Armed Swordsman alongside Jimmy Wang Yu, which met with an unexpected success. She later appeared in films such as The Assassin, Return of the One-Armed Swordsman and A Cause to Kill. In 1972 she left the studio and briefly returned to Taiwan, where she made some television appearances.

In 1976 while Huang was riding a motorbike in Taiwan, he got into a second car accident, however this time he did not survive. Chiao lived alone with her son in Hong Kong. She worked more extensively behind the scenes, most notably as a dubber. She then went on to appear in several Hong Kong films in the 1980s and 1990s, with her last appearance in the 1998 picture Bishonen, making some 50 appearances between 1964 and 1998.

In 1994, she married Hong Kong actor Kenneth Tsang.

In 2009, she appeared in Prince of Tears directed by Yonfan. It showed at film festivals in Venice and Toronto in 2009.
