= Susanna (1967 film) =

1967 Hong Kong film by Ho Meng Hua

- Film poster
- Chinese: 珊珊
- Hanyu Pinyin: Shānshān
- Directed by: Ho Meng Hua
- Written by: Tsou Chi
- Produced by: Run Run Shaw
- Starring: Li Ching; Kwan Shan
- Cinematography: Lin Kuo-Hsiang
- Edited by: Chiang Hsing-Lung
- Music by: Wang Fu-ling
- Production company: Shaw Brothers Studio
- Release date: 16 October 1967 (Hong Kong)
- Running time: 104 minutes
- Country: Hong Kong
- Language: Mandarin

Susanna is a 1967 Hong Kong Shaw Brothers Studio film directed by Ho Meng Hua, starring Li Ching as the Susanna, or Shan Shan.

== Plot ==
The film is about Shan Shan and her life.

== Cast ==
- Li Ching - Susanna
- Kwan Shan - Lin Cheng Ting
- Alison Chang Yen
- Ho Fan
- Lai Man

== Release ==
On 16 October 1967, the film was released in Hong Kong.

== Awards ==
- 1967 Best Picture. 14th Asian Film Festival.
- 1969 Golden Horse Award - Best Sound Recording.
- 1969 Golden Horse Award - Nominated for Best Featured Film.
