= Lovers' Rock (1964 film) =

1964 film

- Film poster
- Directed by: Pan Lei
- Written by: Pan Lei
- Produced by: Run Run Shaw
- Starring: Chiao Chuang
- Cinematography: Hung Ching-Yun; Mui Nuo
- Edited by: Chiang Hsing-Lung; Shen Yeh-Kang
- Music by: Lo Ming-Tao
- Production company: Shaw Brothers Studio
- Distributed by: Shaw Brothers Studio
- Release date: 16 October 1964
- Running time: 95 minutes
- Country: Taiwan
- Language: Mandarin

Lovers' Rock (Chinese: 情人石; pinyin: Qing ren shi) is a 1964 Taiwanese drama film written and directed by Lei Pan. The film was selected as the Taiwanese entry for the Best Foreign Language Film at the 37th Academy Awards, but was not accepted as a nominee.

== Cast ==
- Chiao Chuang as Chin Yu
- Cheng Pei-pei as Lin Chiu-tzu
- Hsang Tsung-hsin as Su Ta-kuei
- Wu Wei as Hui Tan

== See also ==
- List of submissions to the 37th Academy Awards for Best Foreign Language Film
- List of Taiwanese submissions for the Academy Award for Best Foreign Language Film
