= Love Without End (1970 film) =

- Film poster
- 新不了情
- Directed by: Pan Lei
- Written by: Pan Lei
- Produced by: Run Run Shaw
- Starring: Jenny Hu; Ling Yun; Essie Lin Chia
- Cinematography: Charles Tung Shao Yung
- Edited by: Chiang Hsing Lung
- Music by: Wang Fu Ling
- Production company: Shaw Brothers Studio
- Distributed by: Shaw Brothers Studio
- Release date: 31 January 1970 (Hong Kong)
- Running time: 110 minutes
- Country: Hong Kong
- Language: Mandarin

Love Without End (Chinese: 新不了情) is a 1970 Hong Kong film directed by Pan Lei. It is a remake of the 1961 film of the same name.

== Cast ==
- Jenny Hu
- Ling Yun
- Essie Lin Chia
- Wong Chung Shun
- Lui Hung
- Liu Wai
- Ho Wan Tai
- Law Hon
- Poon Oi Lun
- Lee Ho
- Chai Lam
- Cheung Chok Chow
- Chu Gam
- Ding Fung
- Fong Yue
- Fong Yuen
- Gam Gwan
- Kong Lung
- Kuo Yi
- Kwok Poi
- Lin Chih Yung
- Ling Siu
- Liu Kei
- Mang Ga
- Yee Kwan

== See also ==
- 8th Golden Horse Awards
- Buliao qing (song)
