= Pan Lei (film director) =

Taiwanese film director and writer

Pan Lei (潘壘), a Taiwanese film director and writer, was born on August 4, 1927, whose original name was Pan Chengde (Chinese: 潘承德), also known as Pan Lei (Chinese: 潘磊) and his pen name Xinxi (心曦). After joining the army to fight the Japanese at the border of China and India, he came to Taiwan in 1949 and became a well known writer and journal publisher. He began his film career as a scriptwriter and directed his first film in 1959. His third film Typhoon (颱風; 1962) was outstanding among its contemporary films with its bold presentation of female desire and artistic achievement, which won him the praise of "Father of Taiwanese Art Cinema" (台灣藝術電影之父) and the invitation to make films for the Shaw Brothers. He died on July 22, 2017.

== Life and career ==
Pan Lei was born in Haiphong, Vietnam in 1927. After the outbreak of the Pacific War in 1941, he moved to Yunnan with his family and enrolled in Kunming Yue Xiu Middle School, then joined the Anti-Japanese Volunteer Army in Kunming in 1943. In the spring of 1946, Pan was discharged from the army and returned to his hometown due to injury. He found himself caught in the conflict between Vietnam and France, so he went to Shanghai in January 1947 and applied to resume his studies in National Jiangsu Medical College. During his studies, he devoted himself to creative work, writing poems, essays and short stories. In May 1949, as KMT was losing the Chinese Civil War, Pan moved to Taiwan.

After arriving in Taipei, Pan Lei worked as the manager of a small department store specializing in Hong Kong products. In addition to continuing the writing of his long novel The Red River Trilogy (紅河三部曲), he invested all he had, gold bars he brought from Shanghai, to establish the literary journal Bao Dao Wen Yi (寶島文藝; Formosa Literature). The journal did not last for more than a year and Pan lost all his savings. To make a living, Pan started to write, using different pen names, but his income was so meager that he sometimes could not even afford his meals. Thanks to the help of Chang Tao-fan (張道藩), his writings were published in Literary Creation (文藝創作) and won several awards from the Chinese Literature Award (文獎會). In 1952, he published The Red River Trilogy with his own money, a 600-page book depicting the sorrows and bloodshed of the Chinese in the context of Vietnam.

In 1956, Pan Lei adapted his own novel into a screenplay and was recommended by an elder to meet Li Ye (李葉), the then General Manager of Central Pictures Corporation Co., Ltd, (中央電影公司) and found a job there as screenwriter. His first worked as a screenwriter for Taiwanese film was A Miracle of Leprosy (痲瘋女). For his first directorial work On Mount Hehuan (合歡山上) he went deep into the aboriginal tribes in central Taiwan. The film stars Hsiao Yen-chiu (小豔秋) and includes a documentary of the development of the Central Cross-Island Highway in the opening sequence. After his second film The Golden Age (金色年代) about an urban young man finding his right path in life, Pan made his most acclaimed film Typhoon in 1992. The film was shot on Alishan (阿里山) to portray a wife’s failed attempt to break away from a sexless marriage. It won the Best Supporting Actress Award at the Golden Horse Awards and the Best Supporting Actress Award and Special Award for Best Child Actor at Asia Film Awards (亞洲影展).

After seeing Typhoon, Run Run Shaw (邵逸夫) decided to recruit Pan Lei to his Shaw Brothers. Still committed to Tsai Meng Jian (蔡孟堅), the Chairman of Central Pictures Corporation Co., Ltd., Pan did not leave Taiwan. Shaw then set up a small crew under the name of "Shaw's Location Team (邵氏外景隊)" for Pan to make films for Shaw Brothers in Taiwan. Pan only signed the contract with Shaw Brothers after Tsai stepped down as Chairman of Central Pictures Corporation in 1963.

Pan Lei founded his own company, Hsien Dai Motion Pictures (現代電影電視實驗中心) in 1963 in Taipei, with the idea of combining the Centro Sperimentale di Cinematografia (CSC) and Institut des hautes études cinématographiques (IDHEC) into one. Pan subsequently made Lovers' Rock (情人石) and Song of Orchid Island (蘭嶼之歌) for Shaw Brothers, both films are set in Taiwan’s scenic locations. Unfortunately, due to financial difficulties, Pan had to sell it to Zhou Jian-guang (周劍光)in 1968, who turned it into Hwa Kuo Film Studio Co., Ltd. (華國電影製片廠).

Pan Lei is a director capable of making films of different genres. Other than drama films of contemporary settings, Pan also made action films and sword-fighting films (Wu-xia pian; 武俠片). One excellent action is Downhill They Ride (山賊), about a small mountain village’s successful defeat of vicious bandits. The film’s script is written by King Hu (胡金銓) and is shot in the Dasyueshan (大雪山) National Forest Recreation Area, where the snowy mountains of the subtropical island were transformed into the scape of Northeast China. Two representative Wu-xia films directed by Pan are The Fastest Sword (天下第一劍; 1968) and The Sword (劍; 1971), which stars Hog action star Wang Yu (王羽). Both films are unique among their contemporary films of the genre by their denunciation of fame and obsession about swords.

From 1959 to 1984, Pan Lei has directed altogether 26 feature films. At the same time, he also continued to write and published the famous Devil's Tree - Sons of Sin Trilogy (魔鬼樹──孽子三部曲). Linking Publishing Company (聯經出版公司) collated Pan’s writing and published his complete collection of literary works in 1977, which were reprinted by Showwe Information Co., Ltd. (秀威資訊科技股份有限公司) in 2016.

At the end of May 2012, Zuo Guifang (左桂芳), a veteran Chinese film researcher who has spent a lot of time with Pan, was asked by him to compile and write his memoirs.After a few years of extended interviews and editing, the book Buwang Cisheng: Pan Lei Huiyilu (不枉此生：潘壘回憶錄; A Fruitful Life: Pan Lei’s Memoir), a 150,000-word book, was published by the Chinese Taipei Film Archive (now Taiwan Film and Audio-visual Institute) in 2014.

== Personal life ==
Pan Lei's father was from China and his mother was a Vietnamese of French descent. In his memoirs, he emphasizes that his French roots have a profound influence on him.

Pan married actress Wen Ling, who was fifteen years younger than him, in 1960. Wen Ling’s original name was Zeng Qingmei, but Pan said that he liked to call her by her stage name.

Pan was one of the representative writers of anti-Communist literature. He founded Bao Dao Wen Yi, one of the major anti-Communist literary magazines in the 1950s all by himself without government’s subsidies. It was the only major literary publication at the time and led to the rise of literary magazines in Taiwan.

== Filmography ==
- 1984: Woman of Colour (變色的女人)
- 1981: The Tattoo (紋身的女人)
- 1980: Strange Story of Crematory (火葬場奇案)
- 1978: The Adventure of the "Heaven Mouse" (通天老鼠下江南)
- 1977: The Crooks (搵身三十六計)
- 1975: Cuties Parade (妙妙女郎)
- 1975: Evil Seducers (色中餓鬼)
- 1975: Love Lock (情鎖)
- 1972: It All Started with a Bed (好夢連床)
- 1972: Funny Girl (傻大姐)
- 1971: The Sword (劍)
- 1971: The Merciful Sword (報恩刀)
- 1970: Love Without End (新不了情)
- 1969: Purple Darts (紫金鏢)
- 1969: Tomorrow Is Another Day (明日又天涯)
- 1969: Devil Fighter (捉妖斬魔)
- 1968: The Wolf and the Angel (狼與天使)
- 1968: The Fastest Sword (天下第一劍)
- 1968: Fallen Petals (落花時節)
- 1967: The Purple Shell (紫貝殼)
- 1966: Poison Rose (毒玫瑰)
- 1966: Downhill They Ride (山賊)
- 1965: Song of Orchid Island (蘭嶼之歌)
- 1964: Lovers' Rock (情人石)
- 1962: Typhoon (颱風)
- 1960: The Golden Age (金色年代)
- 1959: On Mount Hehuan (合歡山上)
