= Kwan Shan =

Hong Kong actor (1933–2012)

- 關山
- Born: Guan Bowei (關伯威); April 20, 1933; Mukden, Fengtian, Manchukuo (now Shenyang, Liaoning, China)
- Died: October 1, 2012 (aged 79); Hong Kong
- Other name: Guan Shan
- Spouse: Cheung Bing Sai (m. 1960; div. 1975)
- Children: 2
- Relatives: Rosamund Kwan (daughter)

Chinese name
- Traditional Chinese: 關山
- Simplified Chinese: 关山
Transcriptions
Standard Mandarin
- Hanyu Pinyin: Guān Shān
Yue: Cantonese
- Jyutping: Gwaan^{1} Saan^{1}

Kwan Shan (April 20, 1933 – October 1, 2012) was a Hong Kong film actor. Kwan appeared as a romantic lead actor in Mandarin-language films created in Hong Kong, especially during the 1960s. His roles included several Shaw Brothers Studio productions.

== Early life ==
Kwan was born on April 20, 1933, in Shenyang, Liaoning province, China, and later moved to Hong Kong. He was an ethnic Manchu who traced his heritage to the Guwalgiya clan.

== Personal life ==
Kwan's daughter is Rosamund Kwan, an actress.

Kwan died of lung cancer on October 1, 2012, at the age of 79. His funeral was held at the Hong Kong Funeral Home.

== Filmography ==
=== Films ===
This is a partial list of films.

- 1958 You nu huai chun - Ping Kelai
- 1958 Ah Q zheng zhuan - Ah Q
- 1959 Teenager's holiday - Hsu Ke-Ming
- 1960 Yu guang lian - Sheng
- 1961 Love without end - Tang Pengnan
- 1962 Zi mei qing chou
- 1962 Hong lou meng - Jia Lian
- 1962 Xi shi zhong zhong - Chou Da-ye
- 1963 The Love Eterne
- 1963 Yang Nai Wu yu Xiao Bai Cai - Yang Nai-wu
- 1963: Yi mao qian
- 1963: Di er chun - Lin Yung-Kang
- 1964: Between Tears and Smiles
- 1964: Shan ge lian - Liu Ta-lung
- 1965: Hong ling lei
- 1966: the blue and the black - Zhang Xingya
- 1966: Mei gui wo ai ni
- 1966: Kuai lo qing chun
- 1967 Feng huo wan li qing
- 1967 Xing yue zheng hui
- 1967 Xie hen jing - Hu A-Mao
- 1967 Chui si tian e - Tu Fan
- 1967 Susanna (Chinese: 珊珊) - Lin Cheng Ting
- 1967 Chu gu huang yin - Li Meng-chuang
- 1969 Bi hai qing tian ye ye xin - Hu Zhong Ning
- 1969 Tao li chun feng - Tu Ching-Kang
- 1969 Chun can - Liu Shimin
- 1969: Wo hen yue chang yuan
- 1970: A Cause to Kill - Li De Chang
- 1970: Zhongqing yi hao
- 1970: Yi feng qing bao bai wan bing
- 1970: Ku qing hua
- 1970: Chi xin de ren
- 1970: You nan huai chun
- 1970: Duo ming yan luo
- 1971: Wu dui jia ou
- 1971: Shuang qiang Wang Ba Mei
- 1971: Long shang chun hen
- 1971: Dao bu liu ren
- 1971: Jia hua zong bi ye hua xiang
- 1971: Nu shan jing hun
- 1972: Kuang feng sha
- 1972: Se zi tou shang yi ba dao
- 1972: Pei shi
- 1972: Tang ran ke
- 1973 Ai yu qi tan
- 1973 Nu huo
- 1973 Bu su zhi ke
- 1974 Yun piao piao
- 1974 'Hai Yan
- 1974 Guang dao nian ba - Imai Eisaku
- 1974 Bie liao qin ren
- 1974 Zhong tai quan tan sheng si zhan
- 1975 Lao nu ri ji
- 1975 Ling mo
- 1975 Qu mo nu
- 1975 Lang wen
- 1975 Qing suo
- 1975 Shi san bu da
- 1975 Xiao Shandong dao Xianggang
- 1976 Long jia jiang
- 1976 Mi zong sheng shou - Mr. Tseng
- 1976 Qiu Xia - Li Po-hao
- 1976 Yeongno
- 1977 Si da men pai
- 1977 Gui ma gu ye zi
- 1977 Broken Oath - Liu Da Xiong, General Liu.
- 1977 Pian pian feng ye pian pian qing
- 1978 Diao nu - Abbott
- 1978 Hua fei hua
- 1978 Zhui gan pao tiao peng
- 1980 Guningtou da zhan
- 1980 Yuan
- 1980 Da di yong shi
- 1980 Mei li yu ai chou
- 1981: Chuan qi ren wu
- 1981: Huang tian hou tu - Fang Yi-Pao
- 1981: Zhi ye xiong shou
- 1982: Ma liu guo hai
- 1982: Xiao dao hui
- 1982: Shou xin
- 1983: Yi chu jing hun
- 1983: Feng shui er shi nian - Manager Chung
- 1986: Foo gwai lip che - Bandit
- 1986: Dream Lovers - Hark-Nam
- 1987: Duet ming ga yan - Director Cheung
- 1987: A Better Tomorrow II - Ko Ying Pui
- 1988: Police Story 2 - President Fung
- 1991: Gui gan bu - Sub-chief Lu / Li Fu-Min
- 1993: Yin doi hou hap zyun - The President
- 1994: 7 jin gong - Chief (final film role)
