= Buliao qing (song) =

1961 Mandarin popular song

"Bu liao qing" (Chinese: 不了情; pinyin: bùliǎo qíng; Jyutping: bat1 liu5 cing4) is a Mandarin song variously translated into English as "Love Without End", "Endless Love", or "Unforgettable Love". The song was released in 1961, The music was composed by Wong Fuk Ling (王福齡), and the lyrics were written by Tao Tseon (陶秦). The song was first sung by Koo Mei (顧媚), sister of Joseph Koo, in the 1961 Shaw Brothers film of the same name (不了情). This song has been sung by various singers in later years, such as Sally Yeh, Anita Mui, Tsai Chin and Frances Yip.
