= Lin Dai =

Chinese actress

- Lin in the Golden Lotus (1957)
- Born: Ching Yuetyue (程月如); 26 December 1934; Guilin, Guangxi, Republic of China
- Died: 17 July 1964 (aged 29); Tai Hang, Hong Kong
- Years active: 1953–1964
- Spouse(s): Lung Shun Shing, m. 12 February 1961, wid. 17 July 1964, d. 2 April 2007
- Children: Tzong Hann Lung (6 April 1963–13 November 2022 (aged 59))
- Awards: Asia-Pacific Film Festival; Best Actress; 1957 Golden Lotus; 1958 Diau Charn; 1961 Les Belles; 1962 Love Without End

Chinese name
- Traditional Chinese: 林黛
- Simplified Chinese: 林黛
Transcriptions
Standard Mandarin
- Hanyu Pinyin: Lín, Dài
Yue: Cantonese
- Jyutping: Lam4, Doi6

Ching Yuetyue
- Traditional Chinese: 程月如
- Simplified Chinese: 程月如
Transcriptions
Standard Mandarin
- Hanyu Pinyin: Chéng, Yuèrú
Yue: Cantonese
- Jyutping: Cing4, Jyut6ju4

Linda Lin Dai (Chinese: 林黛; 26 December 1934 – 17 July 1964), born Ching Yuetyue (程月如), was a Chinese actress of Hong Kong films made in Mandarin during the 1950s–60s. She was a star actress of the Shaw Brothers Studio. She was the daughter of Chinese politician Cheng Siyuan.

Lin Dai was awarded the Best Actress at the Asia Pacific Film Festival four times for her performances in films produced by Shaw Studio. While she attended short courses on drama and linguistics at Columbia University, New York, in 1958, she met and fell in love with Lung Shun Shing (龍繩勳), the son of Long Yun who was a former governor of China's Yunnan province. They married on 12 February 1961 in Hong Kong.

She committed suicide at home in Hong Kong in July 1964, using an overdose of sleeping pills and inhalation of methane gas, due to family matters referred to by the media as "trivial". Her death shocked the Chinese community. She left behind two unfinished films, The Lotus Lamp and Blue And Black (I and II).

== Filmography ==
- Singing Under the Moon (Cui Cui), 1953
- Spring Is in the Air, 1954
- Love Is Like A Running Brook, 1956
- Golden Lotus (Jin Lian Hua), 1957
- Lady in Distress, 1957
- Scarlet Doll (Hong Wa), 1958
- Laughter and Tears, 1958
- Diau Charn (Diao Chan), 1958
- Cinderella and Her Little Angels, 1959
- The Kingdom and the Beauty (Jiang Shan Mei Ren), 1959
- Spring Frolic, 1959
- Bachelors Beware, 1960
- Les Belles (Qian Jiao Bai Mei), 1961
- Love Without End (He Qing Qing), 1961
- The Swallow, 1961
- Madame White Snake (Bai She Zhuan), 1962
- Love Parade, 1963
- The Last Woman of Shang, 1964
- Beyond the Great Wall, 1964
- The Lotus Lamp, 1965
- The Blue and the Black (Lan Yu Hei), 1966
- The Mirror (Xie hen jing), 1967
