= The Fastest Sword =

1968 Hong Kong-Taiwanese film by Pan Lei

- Film poster
- Directed by: Pan Lei
- Written by: Pan Lei
- Produced by: Shaw Brothers
- Starring: Liu Ping; Chu Jing; Go Ming; Han Chiang; Liu Wai
- Cinematography: Hung Ching-Yun
- Edited by: Chiang Hsing-Lung
- Music by: Wang Fu-Ling
- Production company: Shaw Brothers Studio
- Distributed by: Shaw Brothers Studio
- Release date: 12 November 1968
- Running time: 85 minutes
- Countries: Hong Kong; Taiwan
- Language: Mandarin

The Fastest Sword (Chinese: 天下第一劍) is a 1968 Shaw Brothers wuxia film directed and written by Pan Lei and starring Liu Ping as the eponymous "Fastest Sword", a possibly unbeatable sword fighter. It is noted for comparisons drawn between it and the Hollywood Western The Gunfighter (although such comparisons are exaggerated), its cinematography which is atypical for Hong Kong fight scenes of the time, and a dramatic final fight scene.

== Plot ==
Having killed in a duel yet again, "The Fastest Sword of the South" Ding Menghao is challenged to a duel by an 80 year old monk armed with only a long smoking pipe. If Ding wins the monk will be his servant for three years and if the monk wins Ding has to do what the monk says for three years.

The monk wins with a single blow and Ding follows him to his otherwise empty temple. He spends six months meditating before he complains, is then told to copy all the scriptures in a room which he pretends to have finished, then he is then given a hammer and told to make whatever he wants out of a large boulder of granite at the temple gate. The monk says he will return in six months. When he returns the monk says the larger than life size seated statue of Budai is too large and make it smaller and he will return in six months. When he returns there is a smaller statue but he again says too large and he will return in six months. He returns again and finds a smaller statue with which he is pleased. Ding immediately prepares to leave as the three years are up and the monk in parting tells Ding that he must die before he can live.

Ding takes up residence in a sword school. He refuses duels and tries to befriend his attackers but still there are thirteen fights ending in death. Then an eighteen year old also attacks Ding while Ding is drinking in a shop. Ding walks away, telling the youth to leave but the youth follows Ding and attacks him again, running onto the edge of Ding's only partly drawn sword and dying. Ding is asked to leave by the school's master.

Ding takes up residence in a small village, assumes the name of Zhang, works for another man as a mason/statue carver and is considered odd because he was seen with a fine sword when he arrived and never socialises. After one month bandits attack. Every house and shop in town is damaged except for the masonry, the leader of the attack having taken one look at "Zhang" and left quietly. Rumours start that "Zhang" is in league with them and he prepares to leave but is summoned by the village leader and asked to work on a monument. "Zhang" agrees and is investigated by the leader's daughter Liu Qing, who becomes smitten with him.

The father of the eighteen year old arrives with his sword fighting students and demands that Ding be handed over for revenge. Ding refuses to fight and is whipped by the father. His arm is about to be chopped off when a stranger intercepts the blade and kills all the students. The stranger says he was almost fooled into not discovering "Zhang's" identity as Ding Menghao and challenges him to a duel, revealing himself as Qiu Yixing, The Fastest Sword of the North. Ding refuses.

The leader of the bandit raid reports to his leader, Flying Centipede, the sighting of someone who may be Ding resurfaced after three years. They attack again and Ding has to draw his sword and help. With the bandits despatched, Qiu arrives and insists upon the duel in a temple. Again Ding refuses.

Liu Qing has been kidnapped and Qiu denies involvement but says he knows how to find her and will tell Ding if he agrees to fight. Ding reluctantly agrees. Qiu takes him to the kidnapper White Snake, who thought Ding had killed his brother Black Snake, and Qiu reveals he killed Black Snake before killing White Snake. Liu Qing is saved.

Ding meets Qiu in the temple but refuses to draw his sword despite being attacked by Qiu. When he finally agrees to show his sword he reveals that in his commitment to not fighting he has broken it. Qiu breaks his sword to balance the match. Remembering the monk's words Ding draws the fighter into a smaller space where he is knocked down as Qiu prepares his final thrust.

The next day a rider arrives to challenge Ding but is told that he is too late and is directed to the funeral of the two Fastest Swords who killed each other. At the funeral Liu Qing talks to Ding, revealing her father's plan to have a fake funeral for him after killing Qiu so that he can now live in peace.

== Reception ==
The final duel is considered a cinematic masterpiece. Lead actor Liu Ping provided a good performance, but due to a lack of big name director or actors the film remains rather uncelebrated. The fight choreography is used as an example of how to include meaningful motivation and development in the skills of a character who fights in a film.
