= Doe Ching =

Chinese film director and screenwriter

- Chinese: 陶秦
- Born: 1915; Zhejiang province, China
- Died: 16 May 1969 (aged 53–54); Hong Kong
- Other name: Doe Chin
- Occupations: Film director, screenwriter
- Years active: 1944–1969

Doe Ching (1915 – 16 May 1969) was a Chinese film director and screenwriter who worked in the cinema of Hong Kong.

== Biography ==
In 1915, Doe was born in Zhejiang province, China. Doe directed over 51 films between 1952 and 1969. His 1967 film The Blue and the Black was ranked 91st in the 100 Greatest Chinese-Language Films by the Golden Horse Film Festival in January 2011.

On 16 May 1969, Doe died of stomach cancer in Hong Kong. He was 54 years old.

== Filmography ==
=== Film ===
- 1950 The Flower Street - Writer.
- 1952 Father Marries Again - Director and writer.
- 1952 Tomorrow - Director and writer.
- 1952 A Respectable Family - Director and writer.
- 1953 Aren't the Kids Lovely - Director.
- 1953 The Third Life - Director and writer.
- 1953 Rainbow Rhythms - Assistant director.
- 1954 Temptation - Director and writer.
- 1958 Beware of Pickpockets - Director and writer.
- 1961 Love Without End
- 1964 Between Tears and Laughter
- 1964 The Dancing Millionairess - Director
- 1967 The Blue and the Black
- 1967 Song of Tomorrow - Director, screenwriter.
- 1970 A Cause to Kill - Writer.
