= Endless Love (1981 soundtrack) =

Soundtrack album by various artists
- Released: 1981
- Recorded: 1979–81
- Genre: Pop; hard rock; disco; pop rock
- Length: 41:45
- Label: Mercury Records; PolyGram
- Producer: various artists

Singles from Endless Love
- 1. "Endless Love" Released: 26 June 1981 (US)

Endless Love: Original Motion Picture Soundtrack is the soundtrack album to the film of the same name. The album was released worldwide by Mercury Records and PolyGram in 1981.

The film’s title song, sung as a duet between Diana Ross and Lionel Richie, was a No. 1 hit on the Billboard Hot 100, and is the best-selling single of Ross' career as of 2024. The single stayed at No. 1 for no less than nine weeks from August 9 to October 10, 1981, making it the biggest-selling single of the year in the US. It also topped the Billboard R&B chart and the Adult Contemporary chart as well as becoming a top ten hit single in the UK, peaking at No. 7. It also reached the top ten charts in most parts of the world. The duet single was released by Motown Records worldwide since both artists were still signed to that label at the time, and in effect, became the most successful single in Motown history. It however became Ross' final hit single for the label; shortly thereafter, she signed a then record-breaking $20 million deal with RCA Records. Her first album for her new label, the self-produced Why Do Fools Fall in Love, released the same year, included a solo version of "Endless Love". The Endless Love soundtrack also included a second duet with Ross and Richie, "Dreaming of You", and both songs were also included as orchestral versions alongside Jonathan Tunick's original score.

While Ross' appearance on the Endless Love soundtrack marked the end of an era as she left Motown after twenty years on the label, Lionel Richie's work for the album instead became a new beginning in his career both as a composer, producer and an artist in his own right. The "Endless Love" single was released while he was still officially a member of the Commodores. The success of the duet encouraged Richie to branch out into a full-fledged solo career, releasing his self-titled debut album in 1982 which produced another chart-topping single, "Truly", continuing the style of his ballads with the Commodores like "Easy", "Three Times a Lady" and "Still", as well as ballads Richie composed and produced for other artists like "Lady" for Kenny Rogers which hit No. 1 in 1980.

The soundtrack album also featured two tracks that were not originally recorded for the actual film: Kiss' "I Was Made for Lovin' You", first released on their album Dynasty, a No. 11 hit on Billboard's singles chart in 1979, as well as Cliff Richard's "Dreamin'", written by singer Leo Sayer and producer Alan Tarney, originally included on Richard's album I'm No Hero, also a top ten hit in the UK in 1980. Blondie's 1979 US and UK No. 1 hit "Heart of Glass" which also briefly appeared in the movie was not included on the soundtrack album.

The Endless Love soundtrack was re-released on CD by PolyGram in 1998; this 1998 CD version is now out-of-print. In December 2014, PolyGram re-released the CD soundtrack in Japan under Universal Japan SHM-CD.

Professional ratings
Review scores
| Source | Rating |
|---|---|
| AllMusic | link |

== Track listing ==
Side one
| No. | Title | Writer(s) | Artist(s) | Length |
|---|---|---|---|---|
| 1. | "Endless Love" | Lionel Richie | Diana Ross and Lionel Richie | 4:26 |
| 2. | "Dreaming of You" | Thomas McClary; Richie | Diana Ross and Lionel Richie | 4:31 |
| 3. | "I Was Made for Lovin' You" | Paul Stanley; Desmond Child; Vini Poncia | Kiss | 3:59 |
| 4. | "Dreamin'" | Leo Sayer; Alan Tarney | Cliff Richard | 3:37 |
| 5. | "Endless Love" (Instrumental) | Richie | | 2:45 |

Side two
| No. | Title | Writer(s) | Artist(s) | Length |
|---|---|---|---|---|
| 1. | "Dreaming of You (Theme)" (Instrumental) | Richie | | 4:44 |
| 2. | "Heart Song" (Instrumental) | Jonathan Tunick | | 1:42 |
| 3. | "David Goes to Jade's House" (Instrumental) | Tunick | | 3:35 |
| 4. | "Ann Sees David and Jade Making Love" (Instrumental) | Tunick | | 3:32 |
| 5. | "David at the Institution" (Instrumental) | Tunick | | 4:28 |
| 6. | "Endless Love" (Reprise) | Richie | Diana Ross and Lionel Richie | 4:27 |
| Total length: | | | | 41:45 |

== Charts ==
| Chart (1981) | Peak position |
|---|---|
| Australia (Kent Music Report) | 26 |

== Certifications ==
| Region | Certification | Certified units/sales |
|---|---|---|
| Canada (Music Canada) | Gold | 50,000^{^} |
| Hong Kong (IFPI Hong Kong) | Platinum | 20,000^{*} |
| United Kingdom (BPI) | Gold | 100,000^{^} |
| United States (RIAA) | Gold | 500,000^{^} |
^{*} Sales figures based on certification alone.^{^} Shipments figures based on certification alone.

== Personnel ==
- Lionel Richie - lead and backing vocals on "Endless Love" and "Dreaming of You"
- Diana Ross - lead vocals on "Endless Love" and "Dreaming of You"
- KISS - performers on "I Was Made for Lovin' You"
- Cliff Richard - lead vocals on "Dreamin'"
- Sonny Burke - Fender Rhodes
- David Cochrane - bass guitar, backing vocals
- Paulinho Da Costa - percussion
- Nathan East - bass guitar
- Barnaby Finch - piano
- Ed Greene - drums
- Paul Jackson Jr. - acoustic and electric guitar
- Thomas McClary - guitar
- Sylvester Rivers - Moog synthesizer
- Rick Shlosser - drums
- Deborah Thomas - backing vocals
- David T. Walker - guitar

== Production ==
- Lionel Richie - producer ("Endless Love" and "Dreaming of You")
- Vini Poncia - producer ("I Was Made for Lovin' You")
- Alan Tarney - producer ("Dreamin'")
- Peter Guber - record and soundtrack producer
- Jon Peters - record and soundtrack producer
- Charles Koppelman - executive producer
- Adam Fields - executive producer
- Brenda Richie - production assistant
- Jonathan Tunick - arranger, conductor
- Gene Page - horn arrangements, string arrangements, rhythm arrangements
- Harry Bluestone - concertmaster
- Reginald Dozier - sound engineer, mixing engineer
- Michael Mancini - sound engineer, mixing engineer
- Jeff Lancaster - package design

== See also ==
- Endless Love (2014 soundtrack)

== Sources and external links ==
- Allmusic Diana Ross biography
- Allmusic Lionel Richie biography
- Official Charts Company, UK chart history
- IMDB.com, Endless Love
