= Cyhi the Prynce discography =

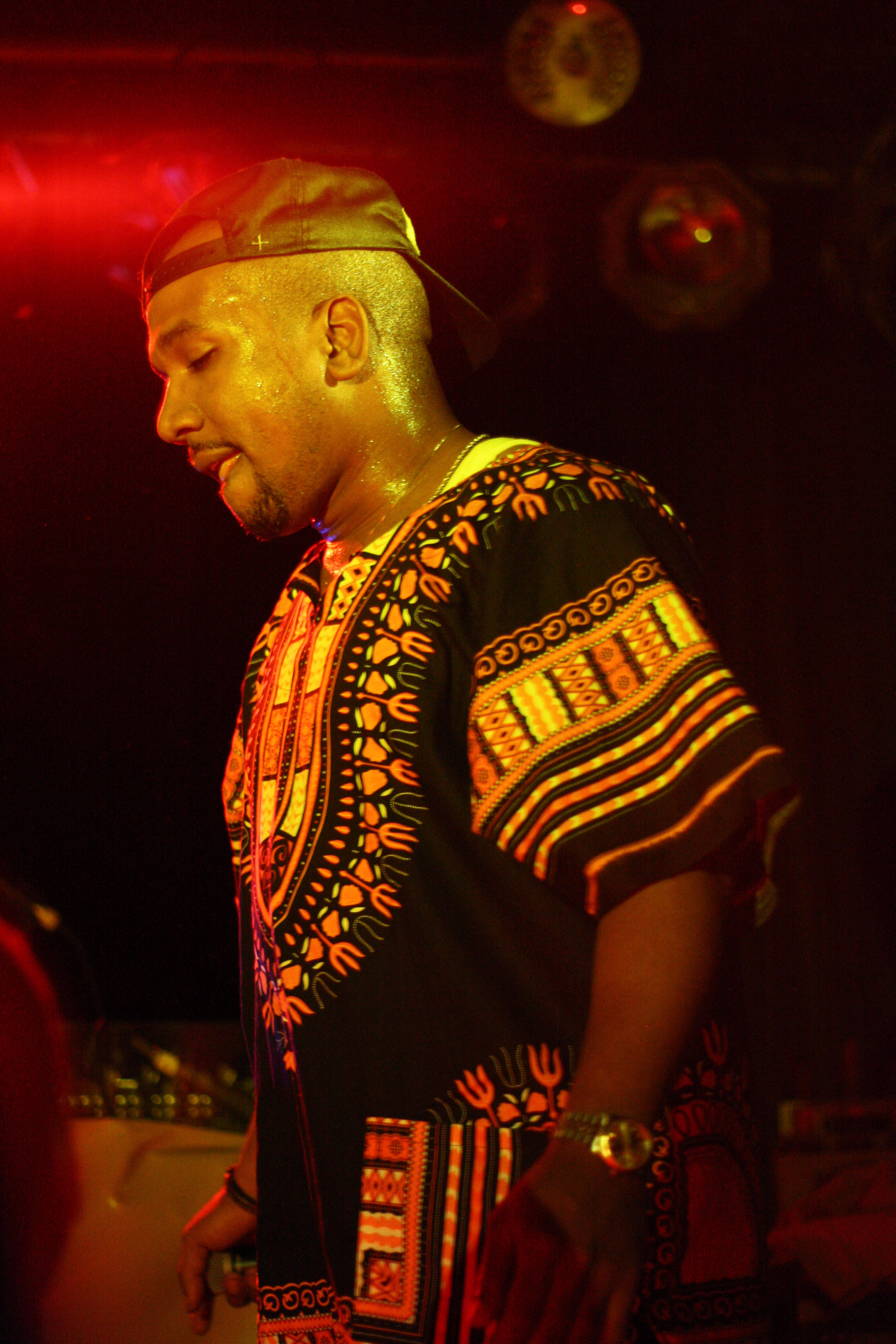
- Studio albums: 1
- EPs: 1
- Singles: 11
- Mixtapes: 6

The discography of American rapper Cyhi the Prynce consists of 1 studio album, 11 singles, 6 mixtapes and 1 extended play.

Alongside his recording career, Cyhi has a prolific songwriting career, having co-written songs for artists including Kanye West, Travis Scott, and Sean Combs. These songs include, but are not limited to "All Day", "Famous" and "Father Stretch My Hands" by West, "Stargazing" and "No Bystanders" by Scott, and "Workin" by Combs.

== Albums ==
=== Studio albums ===
List of studio albums
Title	Album details	Peak chart positions
Title	Album details	US
No Dope on Sundays	Released: November 17, 2017; Label: Sony Music; Format: CD, Digital download	65

=== Compilation albums ===
List of albums, with selected chart positions, sales figures and certifications
Title	Album details	Peak chart positions						
Title	Album details	US	US R&B	AUS	CAN	FRA	SWI	UK
Cruel Summer (with GOOD Music)	Released: September 18, 2012; Label: GOOD Music, Def Jam; Format: CD, digital download	2	1	7	4	30	10	2
The Stoned Mountain Playlist (with Jonathan Hay)	Released: September 20, 2016; Label: Drink The Lemonade; Format: CD, digital download	—	—	—	—	—	—	—
"—" denotes items that did not chart or were not released.

=== Mixtapes ===
List of mixtapes, with year released
Title	Album details
Royal Flush	Released: October 14, 2010; Label: Self-released; Format: Digital download
Royal Flush 2	Released: June 14, 2011; Label: Self-released; Format: Digital download
Jack of All Trades	Released: August 30, 2011; Label: Self-released; Format: Digital download
Ivy League Club	Released: July 17, 2012; Label: Self-released; Format: Digital download
Ivy League: Kick Back	Released: January 30, 2013; Label: Self-released; Format: Digital download
Black Hystori Project	Released: February 24, 2014; Label: Self-released; Format: Digital download; Executive produced by Kanye West
Black Hystori Project 2: N.A.A.C.P.	Released: February 13, 2015; Label: Self-released; Format: Digital download; Executive produced by Kanye West

=== Extended plays ===
List of EPs
Title	Album Details
EGOT the EP	Released: June 4, 2022; Label: EGOT Records, EMPIRE; Format: Digital download

== Singles ==
=== As lead artist ===
List of singles as lead artist, with selected details and chart positions
Title	Year	Album
"Like It or Not"	2015	non-album singles
"Lord Lord Lord" (featuring K Camp)	2015	non-album singles
"Movin' Around" (featuring Schoolboy Q)	2017	No Dope On Sundays
"Dat Side" (featuring Kanye West)	2017	No Dope On Sundays
"Ryder" (featuring Canjelae)	2020	non-album single
"Tears" (featuring Jacquees)	2022	EGOT the EP
"No Competition"	2026	TBA
"B.R.A. Lost Control"	2026	TBA
"The G.O.O.D Ole Days"	2026	TBA
"Look What You've Done"	2026	TBA
"Bouncin Off Me"	2026	TBA

=== As featured artist ===
List of singles as featured artist, with selected details and chart positions
Title	Year	Peak chart positions		Album
Title	Year	US Bub.	US R&B/ HH Bub.	Album
"Christmas in Harlem" (Kanye West featuring Cyhi the Prynce and Teyana Taylor)	2010	13	3	non-album singles
"Freak Some More" (Josh Jakq featuring Cyhi the Prynce)	2011	—	—	non-album singles
"Get It" (Cheech Marley featuring Cyhi the Prynce and Young Dolph)	2013	—	—	non-album singles
"Turn Up" (Corei G. featuring Cyhi the Prynce)	2014	—	—	non-album singles
"Get Off" (Young Win featuring Cyhi the Prynce and Jay Ant)	2014	—	—	non-album singles
"Cash Flow" (M.I.G.S. featuring Cyhi the Prynce)	2015	—	—	non-album singles
"Everyday" (Eroc HistoryMakerz featuring Cyhi the Prynce and Sir Michael Rocks)	2015	—	—	non-album singles
"One Step (Wildlife)" (Hassan Khaffaf featuring Cyhi the Prynce, Rocco Moon and Willie Dynamite)	2015	—	—	non-album singles
"Addict, Pt. 2" (Jonathan Hay with Cyhi the Prynce featuring Canibus, Frida Dee and Sabrina Hale)	2015	—	—	The Stoned Mountain Playlist
"Opulent AF" (Gilles featuring Cyhi the Prynce)	2016	—	—	non-album single
"404" (Matt Citron featuring Cyhi the Prynce and Money Makin Nique)	2016	—	—	Final Moments of Forever
"White Linen" (Mansionz featuring Cyhi the Prynce)	2018	—	—	Mansionz
"Indiana" (Jonathan Hay featuring Cyhi the Prynce, Aneesa Badshaw)	2018	—	—	The Whoodlum Ball
"Drip Drop" (Jack Harlow featuring Cyhi the Prynce)	2018	—	—	Loose
"Black Savage" (Royce da 5'9 featuring T.I., Sy Ari da Kid, White Gold and Cyhi the Prynce)	2020	—	—	The Allegory

== Other charted songs ==
List of songs, with selected chart positions
Title	Year	Peak chart positions	Album
Title	Year	US R&B	Album
"So Appalled" (Kanye West featuring Jay-Z, Pusha T, CyHi the Prynce, Swizz Beatz and RZA)	2010	— (Note: "So Appalled" did not enter the Hot R&B/Hip-Hop Songs chart, but peaked at number 14 on the Bubbling Under R&B/Hip-Hop Singles chart.)	My Beautiful Dark Twisted Fantasy

== Guest appearances ==
List of non-single guest appearances, with other performing artists, showing year released and album name
Title	Year	Other artist(s)	Album
"Don't Go Outside"	2009	Killer Mike	Underground Atlanta
"Pass Me the Rubbas"	2009	Verse Simmonds, Young Capone	The Sextape Chronicles
"I Wish" (Remix)	2010	Yelawolf, Pill	—N/a
"Ray Ban Vision"	2010	A-Trak	Fool's Gold Vol. 1
"Soulja"	2010	Selasi	Coming to America
"Higher"	2010	B.o.B, Playboy Tre, Bun B	No Genre
"Take One for the Team"	2010	Kanye West, Keri Hilson, Pusha T	GOOD Fridays
"Looking for Trouble"	2010	Kanye West, Pusha T, Big Sean, J. Cole	GOOD Fridays
"Christmas in Harlem"	2010	Kanye West, Cam'ron, Jim Jones, Vado, Big Sean, Musiq Soulchild, Teyana Taylor, Pusha T	GOOD Fridays
"So Appalled"	2010	Kanye West, Jay-Z, Pusha T, Swizz Beatz, RZA	My Beautiful Dark Twisted Fantasy
"Honor"	2010	Laws	—N/a
"Stand Still"	2011	Tity Boi	Codeine Cowboy (A 2 Chainz Collective)
"I'm On One" (Remix)	2011	Talib Kweli	—N/a
"All for Me"	2011	XV, Vado, Erin Christine	Zero Heroes
"Thirsty"	2011	Terrace Martin, Kendrick Lamar	—N/a
"Outfit"	2011	Bobby V	Fly on the Wall
"Gotta Get Dat Money"	2011	Bobby V	—N/a
"Hometeam"	2011	Wes Fif, Big K.R.I.T., Dreamer (of Hollyweerd)	Golden Nights
"Rise"	2011	Pill, Wale, Teedra Moses, Curren$y	Self Made Vol. 1
"Ray Ban Vision" (Remix)	2011	A-Trak, Donnis, Pill, Danny Brown	—N/a
"Racks" (Remix)	2011	YC, Young Jeezy, Wiz Khalifa, Waka Flocka Flame, B.o.B, Bun B, Twista, Big Sean, Cory Mo, Cory Gunz, Nelly, Ace Hood, Trae, Wale, Yo Gotti	—N/a
"If You Wanna" (Remix)	2011	Knoc-turn'al, K-Young	Knoc's Ville
"Room 925"	2011	Mike Posner	The Layover
"Let Me Go" (Remix)	2011	Shaun Boothe	Waiting Room
"Heater"	2012	Truth Turner	The Whole Truth
"We Ain't Playin"	2012	Chip tha Ripper, Malik Yusef	Tell Ya Friends
"Luv Me"	2012	Tez McClain, Nikkiya	Wishful Thinking 2: Respect My Grind
"Bad Bitches, Good Weed"	2012	Big Bang	—N/a
"Roaches" (Remix)	2012	¡Mayday!, SpaceGhostPurrp	—N/a
"Celebration"	2012	Celeb Forever, Maclyn Lucille	Make Believers
"All I Know"	2012	Jacquees, Jody Breeze	Fan Affiliated
"La Belle Vie"	2012	NA!RA, Ess Vee	FEARLESS: The Art of Letting Go
"Summertime Ish"	2012	Big Hud, Yelawolf	The Long Way Home
"Me & My Baby"	2012	Lloyd	The Playboy Diaries
"Know How to Hustle"	2012	Chubbie Baby, Big Zak	36 Oz, Part 2
"After Party"	2013	Bangladesh, Future, Alley Boy, Fast Life	Ponzi Scheme
"Material Thing$ Hard to Deal With"	2013	Trinidad James	10 PC Mild
"Look at My Name"	2013	Chris Webby	The Homegrown EP
"Hold You Down"	2013	Snow Tha Product	Good Nights & Bad Mornings 2: The Hangover
"I've Been Waiting"	2015	Various Artists	When Music Worlds Collide
"Flower in the Addict"	2015	Various Artists	When Music Worlds Collide
"Rep Yo Click"	2018	Lil Jon, Freeway, Bangladesh	Superfly
"How It Go"	2018	Tray Haggerty, Sy Ari Da Kid	Brokn Roses
"Sky City"	2024	¥$, Desiigner, 070 Shake	Vultures 2
