= Love Without End (1961 film) =

1961 Hong Kong film by Doe Ching

- Film poster
- 不了情
- Directed by: Doe Ching
- Written by: Doe Ching; Poon Lau Doi
- Produced by: Run Run Shaw
- Cinematography: Tadashi Nishimoto; Charles Tung Shao Yung
- Edited by: Chiang Hsing Lung
- Music by: Wang Fu Ling
- Production company: Shaw Brothers Studio
- Release date: 12 October 1961 (Hong Kong)
- Running time: 117 minutes
- Country: Hong Kong
- Language: Mandarin

Love Without End (Chinese: 不了情) is a 1961 Hong Kong film directed by Doe Ching. It was remade in 1970.

== Cast ==
- Lin Dai
- Kwan Shan
- Kao Pao Shu
- Cheung Kwong Chiu
- Yeung Chi Hing
- Lee Wan Chung
- Lok Kei
- Ho Fan
- Wong Chung
- Gam Gwan
- Chai Lam
- Liu Kei

== See also ==
- Buliao qing (song)
