= Drop City Yacht Club =

American hip hop group

- Also known as: The Freshmen
- Origin: San Francisco, California, United States
- Genres: Hip hop, West Coast hip hop
- Years active: 2009–2015 (disband)
- Label: A&M/Octone Records/Exit 8
- Members: Kristo; THX; A-Wolf
- Website: www.dropcityyachtclub.com (currently inactive)

Drop City Yacht Club was an American hip hop group performing for Platform, LLC, A&M/Octone Records through a joint venture with Exit 8 Records. Drop City Yacht Club members include Kristo (rapper) and THX (producer). One of the original members, A-Wolf, left for unknown reasons. Originally called The Freshmen, they adopted their new moniker in early 2013. Known for their atypical approach to making a rap record, they describe themselves as individually crazy artists collaborating to create one sane group.

The group's style fuses hip hop, pop and 1960s rock. A-Wolf described these characteristics as similar to The Beach Boys and The Beastie Boys.

A single, "Crickets," featuring R&B singer Jeremih, was their first release. A&M/Octone executive VP and head of promotion, Ben Berkman, explained that Jeremih was picked to redo the hook to give it a more rhythmic format. The song makes fun of their own rejections. The single peaked at 36 on the mainstream top 40 chart, at 36 on the hot R&B/hip-hop chart and fell just short of charting on the Billboard Hot 100, peaking at 102. The group's video for "Crickets" has over four million views. In the fall of 2013, the group released their debut album.

== Discography ==
=== EPs ===
Album title	Album details
Crickets - EP	Released: February 26, 2013; Label: Exit 8/A&M/Octone; Formats: digital download; Executive Producers Platform, LLC (Vince Phillips & Malik Rasheed)

=== Singles ===
List of singles by title, year and peak chart positions, and album
Title	Year	Peak chart positions			Album
Title	Year	US	US Pop Songs	US R&B/Hip-Hop	Album
"Crickets" (feat. Jeremih)	2013	102	36	36	Crickets - EP
"—" denotes releases that did not chart or receive certification.
