= Reincarnated (TV series) =

1979 Hong Kong TV drama series

- Genre: Wuxia
- Starring: Norman Chui; Ng Wai Kwok; Nora Miao; Candice Yu On On
- Opening theme: "天蠶變" (Reincarnated) by Michael Kwan
- Composer: Michael Lai
- Country of origin: Hong Kong
- Original language: Cantonese
- No. of episodes: 60

Original release
- Network: RTV

Related
- Dragon Strikes; Reincarnated II (1993 Sequel)

Reincarnated
- Traditional Chinese: 天蠶變
- Simplified Chinese: 天蚕变
Transcriptions
Standard Mandarin
- Hanyu Pinyin: tiān cán biàn
Yue: Cantonese
- Jyutping: tin1 caam4 bin3

Reincarnated is a 60-episode 1979 wuxia television series and was produced and aired by Rediffusion Television in Hong Kong and also a series of books, TV and films written by Wong Ying (黃鷹) who co-wrote some of Gu Long stories, such as the Six Spine-Chilling Stories Series and other people.

== Plot ==
Although by day Wan Fei Yeung appears to be devoid of martial ability, a simple bumpkin and the butt of practical jokes and the contempt of the schools pupils, he is in fact the most able martial artist of all the youngsters at the school. Every night since childhood Wan has secretly practised martial arts in the woods taught to him by a masked teacher whose identity is a secret even to him.

Wan is the actually illegitimate son of Tsing Tsung (青松), the head of the Wudang school, however as a Taoist sect sworn to chastity, Tsing dare not acknowledge Wan as his son, nor out of fear of discovery accept him as an official pupil of the school. However out of paternal responsibility it is Tsing who secretly teaches Wan not only the basic patterns and forms taught to ordinary students of the school but also those patterns and forms reserved for senior initiates in the school. These advanced patterns allow a practitioner to channel and nurture his qi and is reserved for those who may potentially become head of the school.

The advanced art has eight levels and at the highest level would allow the practitioner to spin a cocoon around his body. While in this cocoon, his or her body will be completely remade and become infused with qi. At the time that the practitioner breaks out of his cocoon, not only will his martial arts prowess be greatly enhanced, he or she is reborn, and is thus said to be reincarnated.

However, the seventh part of the art has been lost, and for generations even the heads of the school have been unable to progress beyond the sixth level, although they still have the eighth part of the manual intact no Wudang practitioner in living history has been able to jump from the sixth to the eighth level.

The sole living practitioner of the eighth level is the wife of Tsing Tsung's mortal enemy Foeless, the head of the Foeless School, the name foeless is taken because all would be foes are dead or intimidated into acquiescence. Foeless desires to be the paramount leader of the Wulin and to do so issues challenges to duel the individual champions of each of the schools and associations making up Wulin. Despite his ambitions Foeless is a man of his word and has a gentleman's agreement with Tsing Tsung that the winner of a duel between them should have the right to command the other until the next duel between them, the period between duels being 10 years.

Twenty years previously when Tsing Tsung and Foeless duelled, Tsing Tsung won but was geviously wounded, he was nursed back to health by Foeless' wife, Sum Man Kwun. Foeless has neglected his wife in his quest to become the greatest fighter in Wulin and lonely Sum and Tsing Tsung become lovers. When Tsing Tsung has to return to Wudang he leaves with Sum the most precious thing in his possession as a promise of his return, his copy of the level eight Wudang manual. However, Tsing Tsung never does return, and alone again Sum studies the manual in memory of her lover, having no previous experience of qi cultivation and therefore no preconceptions of how to interpret the manual, Sum succeeds where generations of Wudang practitioners have failed and acquires qi powers that surpass even that of both her husband and lover.

In their last duel ten years previously Tsing Tsung almost defeats Foeless, and he never fully recovers from the internal injuries sustained at that time. Foeless has progressed in that time and Tsing Tsung knows that in their next duel he will lose and most likely die. To prevent the loss of Wudang level six, the six best Wudang students are selected and each is taught one of the components of the level, it being impossible in the time left for one individual to acquire all the components. One of those selected for this task is Fu Yuk Shui, a new pupil at Wudang who is taken in by the school when his entire family is supposedly murdered by Foeless.

Fu yuk Shui is actually a mole in Wudang, being the grandson of the Old Man of the Ice Pool. The Old Man is the leader of Anarchist Valley a group that delights in chaos, murder and destruction for its own sake rather than as a tool to further ambition as Foeless does. While Foeless can be trusted to keep his word and put his schemes on hold if defeated, the Old Man cannot, and is kept chained and imprisoned in Wudang's dungeon. In the process of freeing his grandfather Fu kills Tsing Tsung, only on Tsing Tsung's death does Wan learn the Tsing Tsung is his secret teacher and that he is his father.

With Tsing Tsung dead Foeless makes the offer that if the Wudang students can defeat his own he will allow the school to keep its independence. The Wudang students lose, Wan intervenes and defeats the foeless students preserving the school's independence. However Wan is not greeted as a hero and saviour, the skills that he used to defeat the foeless was Wudang's level six, he is accused of stealing secrets he is not entitled to and of being Tsing Tsung's killer. Driven away from Wudang Wan begins to roam the Wulin world, as a wandering hero.

During his adventures Wan's actions and deeds show the Wulin community what kind of man he is, his chivalry earning him the respect of the elders of other schools, leading them to act as intermediaries between him and Wudang. Wan becomes a candidate to be the orthodox school's champion. The battle for supremacy in Wulin becomes a four way one: the orthodox schools aligned with Wudang, Foeless, the Anarchists, and late comers Jyun Ye Court, a faction from outside China proper.

In his wandering Wan meets Fu Heung Kwun, the sister of Fu Yuk Shui, and Phoenix, who everyone believes to be the daughter of Foeless. Both women fall in love with Wan but it is Phoenix that he comes to love the most. To prevent his daughter being with the son of his enemy, Foeless arranges for Phoenix to marry his star student. Wan crashes the wedding but is defeated by Foeless, and barely escapes with his life. Escaping Wan blunders into the chambers of Sum Man Kwun collapsing close to death.

Following her learning of Wudang's eighth level Sum Min Kwun has become a recluse. Her qi powers have rendered her ageless, and even as her husband, lover and daughter have grown older around her Sum has remained unaged. Sum realises that Wan is the son of her lover and uses her qi powers to save him, guides him through the acquisition of Wudang level eight, and instructs him in the use of qi for self healing. As Wan uses qi to heal himself a cocoon forms around him and within it Wan's body is remade anew. While in Sum's case the level eight qi force rendered her perpetually youthful, Wan's body was severely wounded when the cocoon formed and in order to restore him to health the remaking of his body is much more severe, and Wan emerges from the cocoon with a new face.

The Anarchists defeat Foeless and destroy his prestige and power base. Those of his followers that are not killed, scatter go into hiding or switch sides to join the Anarchists or Jyun Ye Court in order to escape the vengeance of the many enemies Foeless has made. Foeless himself becomes a fugitive, seeking to tie Wan to himself he makes peace with Wan and gives his blessing to Wan and Phoenix's marriage. Just as Wan and Phoenix are about to be married, Sum intervenes and reveals that Phoenix is not Foeless' but Tsing Tsun's daughter, making her Wan's half sister. Heartbroken Phoenix throws herself off a cliff into the sea, with her death Wan loses interest in life and the struggles for supremacy in Wulin. Without any prospect of allies willing to help him, in order to escape his enemies, Foeless hides beneath a mask and offers his services and loyalty to Jyun Ye Court.

The Anarchists are defeated and crushed by Jyun Ye Court, and the battle becomes a two way one between the orthodox schools and the Court. Fu Yuk Shui has become leader of Wudang and desires to become the champion of the orthodox schools, if he can defeat Jyun Ye Court, he would be able to avenge his grand father and be in position to become the paramount leader of the Wulin community. As leader of Wudang, Fu is given the original copy of the level eight manual, like all the other Wudang leaders before him however much he studies the manual he finds it impossible to practise the skills in it. Frustrated he throws the manual into a brazier to burn. As the pages of the manual burn away metal plates are revealed to have been hidden in its pages, together these plates are Wudang's long lost level seven. Fu realises that if he can master level seven he can recreate the level eight instructions from memory. However Fu does not have the time to do this if he is to be selected as the orthodox schools' champion.

Fu takes a page out Tsing Tsun's book, level seven is made of two components the stork and the snake, and Foo chooses a partner to split the level with. He chooses Luk Dan, someone with an intense hatred of Wan, to be his partner, they each take one of the animals, and become the strongest contender's for the orthodox champion.

Fu Heung Kwun finds Wan and tries to convince him to fight to be the leader of Wulin. If her brother wins he will use his leadership of Wulin for his own ends, and if he loses control of Wulin will fall to foreigners. However until the final duel comes, Wan seems to care about nothing.

== Cast ==
- Norman Chui as Wan Fei Yeung

== Production ==
The TV series was written by Wong and other screenwriters, with a novelisation being written after the TV series became popular.

The series was filmed on a "live shoot" basis, with episodes being filmed only very shortly before airing, on a five episodes per week, one episode each weekday basis. When the series became popular it made a star of lead actor Norman Chui and Chui became the subject of a courtship by movie studios who offered him lucrative and prestigious film roles. Differences arose on set between the production team and Tsui which resulted in Tsui walking off set and refusing to film. The upshot of this was that the role of Wan Fei Yeung was given to another actor, this being explained away by the in story device of the protagonist receiving a new face when he was reincarnated by the cocoon of the Wudang qi manual.

Reincarnated was a popular and ratings success for RTV, in response TVB brought forward the airing of their own wuxia drama Chor Lau-heung and scheduled it directly against Reincarnated. As a counter spoiling tactic RTV created their own Chu Liuxiang analog, It Takes a Thief, and scheduled it to run on weekends before TVB's weekday broadcasts.

At this time the home videocassette recorder was beginning to gain mass market acceptance and the desire to watch both RTV's and TVB's offerings helped spur their acceptance in Hong Kong and in Chinese communities abroad.

== Sequels and remakes ==
The popularity of the Wan Fei Yeung character led to a number of sequels and the use of the character to promote other series.

The first sequel is the 1979 60-episode RTV series Dragon Strike (天龍訣), a friend of Wen helps the Zhengde Emperor to fight his enemies the White Lotus sect. Afraid of his abilities the emperor kills him. In this series, Wan is killed mid series by Phoenix, his lover and sister, who having survived her attempted suicide has been drugged and brain washed into an implacable assassin.

A 1984 Taiwanese (CTS) television series Reincarnated II (天蠶再變), is a rebooted follow-up to the original 1978 Hong Kong series, a friend of Wen fights a man with powerful martial arts and wants to be the emperor, finally he wins.

The 1993, 30-episode ATV television series, Reincarnated II (天蠶變之再與天比高) is another rebooted follow-up of the 1978 series, Wan is in fact still alive and has regained his previous looks (his face changed again when he "reincarnated" again). Wan teaches the reincarnating art to a successor and dies standing after a battle.

In the beginning of the 1980 60-episode RTV series Hegemony of the Lake or known as On the Waterfront (湖海爭霸錄), Wan is killed by the White Lotus sect.

The series was remade in 2001 as a 30 episodes 2001 TV series, New Reincarnated (新天蚕变/金蚕丝雨). There are some difference in the ending to the Mainland China and Taiwan versions of the series.

== Other media ==
Reincarnated was remade in a 1983 Shaw Brothers Studio film as the Bastard Swordsman

A follow on 1984 Shaw Brothers Studio film, Return of the Bastard Swordsman, saw Wan fight a Japanese ninja, it is rewritten from Reincarnated and Face to Fate written by Woon Swee Oan.

Wong wrote a prequel to "Reincarnated" in the Hong Kong magazine Knightly (武侠世界) about the origin of the Wudang level eight martial art.

The plot of the films and TV series had some changes with the books.

== Music ==
Tin tsam bin (天蠶變) is a Cantopop album by Michael Kwan, released in 1979 by Philips Records (Hong Kong). It contains three theme songs from the series.

Side one

1. "Reincarnated" (天蠶變 tin tsam bin), composed by Michael Lai Siu-Tin (黎小田), lyrics by Lo Kwok-Jim (盧國沾)
  Main theme song; awarded as one of top ten songs in the 1979 RTHK Top 10 Gold Songs Awards
2. "Wondering What You Know" (問君知否 maan kwan jee fau), composed by Li Tai-hsiang, lyrics by Lo Kwok-Jim
  Cantonese version of the 1979 Mandarin song "The Olive Tree" (橄欖樹) by Chyi Yu
3. "Related Silence" (相對無言 seung deui mou yin), composed by Randy Sparks, lyrics by Lo Kwok-Jim
  Cantonese version of "Today" (1964) by The New Christy Minstrels
4. "koo fong duk deui teen" (孤芳獨對天), composed by Yu Leun (于粦), lyrics by Lo Kwok-Jim
  Sub-theme song
5. "Old Dreams" (舊事隨夢去 gau si tseui mung heui), composed by Kōichi Morita, lyrics by Cheng Kwok-Kong (鄭國江)
  Cantonese version of the 1977 song "sugi te shimae ba" (過ぎてしまえば) by Kōichi Morita and Top Gallants
  Sung previously in 1978 by Paula Tsui
6. "No Irresolutions" (莫徬徨 mok pong wong), composed by Barry Mann, lyrics by Cheng Kwok-Kong
  Cantonese version of "Sometimes When We Touch" (1978) by Dan Hill

Side two

1. "Moonlight Plateau" (月亮照高原 yuet leung jiu gou yuen), composed by Randy VanWarmer, lyrics by Lo Kwok-Jim
  Cantonese version of "Just When I Needed You Most" (1979) by Randy VanWarmer
2. "In the Snow" (雪中情 suet jung ching), composed by Tai Zhaomei (邰肇玫), lyrics by Lo Kwok-Jim
  Cantonese version of the 1977 song "If" (如果) by Tai Zhaomei and Shi Biwu (施碧梧)
3. "I Want to Go Faraway" (我要走天涯 ngo yiu tsau teen ngai), composed by Peter Yarrow, lyrics by Cheng Kwok-Kong
  Cantonese version of Peter Yarrow's 1972 song "Tall Pine Tree"
4. "Changing Much Hatred" (換到千般恨 woon dou cheen boon haan), composed by Michael Lai, lyrics by Lo Kwok-Jim
  Sub-theme song, sung by Lau Ying-Hung (柳影虹)
5. "An Ocean Spray" (一個浪花 yat gaw long faa), lyrics by Lo Kwok-Jim

== International popularity ==
When the television series was released abroad, it gained significant popularity, especially in Taiwan and Thailand. In Thailand, it first aired in 1980 on Channel 3 under the title กระบี่ไร้เทียมทาน (Krabi ri tiam-tan, lit. 'unrivaled sword'). Originally, the station scheduled the show to air three times a week, on Mondays, Wednesdays, and Fridays. However, due to its overwhelming popularity, the broadcast was soon expanded to every weekday, from Monday through Friday. The opening and ending theme songs also became hits, with their lyrics adapted into Thai. It is considered a pioneering example of the wuxia television series genre, leading many other channels to air similar series. This period marked the peak of popularity for wuxia dramas throughout the 1980s and 1990s.
