= Chor Lau-heung =

Chor Lau-heung may refer to:

- Chor Lau Heung or Chu Liuxiang, the fictional protagonist of the wuxia novel series Chu Liuxiang Series (楚留香系列) by Gu Long
- Chor Lau-heung (1979 TV series), a Hong Kong television series
- Chor Lau-heung (1985 TV series), a Taiwanese television series
- Chor Lau-heung (1995 TV series), a Taiwanese television series
