= The Legend of Chu Liuxiang =

The Legend of Chu Liuxiang may refer to:

- The Legend of Chu Liuxiang, an umbrella title for the first three books in the Chu Liuxiang series of novels by Gu Long
- The Legend of Chu Liuxiang (2007 TV series), a 2007 Chinese television series based on the first three books in the Chu Liuxiang Series
- The Legend of Chu Liuxiang (2012 TV series), a 2012 Chinese television series based on four books in the second part of the Chu Liuxiang Series
