= Ching Li =

Hong Kong actress (1945-2017)

- 井莉
- Born: October 29, 1945; Jinan, Shangdong, Republic of China
- Died: December 9, 2017 (aged 72); Hong Kong
- Other names: Cheng Le; Jing Li
- Education: Chu Hai College of Higher Education
- Years active: 1967–1985
- Spouse: Philip Tse (謝宏中) (m. 1970; div. 1984)
- Father: Ching Miao
- Relatives: Ching Hong (brother)

Chinese name
- Chinese: 井莉
Transcriptions
Standard Mandarin
- Hanyu Pinyin: Jǐng Lì
- Wade–Giles: Ching^{3} Li^{4}

Ching Li (Chinese: 井莉; 1945–2017) was a Hong Kong actress popular in the 1970s. She appeared in more than 60 films, mostly by Shaw Brothers Studio.

== Early life ==
On October 29, 1945, Ching was born in Jinan, Shangdong, Republic of China. Her father Ching Miao was an actor with the Shaw Brothers Studio. She had a elder brother Ching Hong. She grew up in Taiwan, and moved to Hong Kong when she was 21. Both her and her brother became actors.

== Filmography ==
=== Films ===
Year	English title	Original title	Role	Notes
1967	The Thundering Sword	神劍震江湖	Hao'er	
1967	My Dream Boat	船	Cheng Xiangyi	
1967	King Cat	七俠五義	Jinhua	
1968	Mist Over Dream Lake	寒煙翠	Zhang Lingyun	
1968	When the Clouds Roll By	雲泥	Xiong Susu	
1969	Twin Blades of Doom	陰陽刀	Yinsai'er	
1969	Twelve Deadly Coins	十二金錢鏢	Yuan Yurong	
1970	Ripples	一池春水	Ah Xiang	
1970	Double Bliss	雙喜臨門	Li Mingzhu	
1970	The Secret of the Dirk	大羅劍俠	Liu Mingzhu	
1971	Mission Impossible	劍女幽魂	Huo Xiaofen	
1971	The Anonymous Heroes	無名英雄	Hong Yinfeng	
1971	Duel of Fists	拳擊	Yulan	
1971	Sunset	夕陽戀人	Huang Xiaoping	
1972	Boxer from Shantung	馬永貞	Jin Lingzi	
1972	Angry Guest	惡客	Yu Lan	
1972	Fists of Vengeance	鐵拳燕子飛	Guan Yuehua	
1972	Man of Iron	仇連環	Shen Jufang	
1972	Intrigue in Nylons	少奶奶的絲襪	Helen Tse	
1972	Four Riders	四騎士	Song Hua	
1973	Heroes of the Underground	丁一山	Wang Ling	
1973	Tales of Larceny	牛鬼蛇神	Daughter at festival	Segment 1: "The Scholar and the Soldier" (秀才遇見兵)
1973	The Blood Brothers	刺馬	Mi Lan	
1973	Na Cha and the Seven Devils	梅山收七怪	Yuewa	
1973	The House of 72 Tenants	七十二家房客	Ah Heung	
1974	Sex, Love and Hate	舞衣	Zhu Dai	
1974	Hong Kong 73	香港73	Chow Yuk Fong	
1974	Sorrow of the Gentry	朱門怨	Yatong	
1975	Lover's Destiny	新啼笑因緣	Chen Fengxian	
1975	The Big Holdup	大劫案	Zifen	
1976	Killer Clans	流星蝴蝶劍	Xiaodie	
1976	The Magic Blade	天涯明月刀	Qiu Yuzheng	
1976	The Web of Death	五毒天羅	Hong Susu	
1976	The Forbidden Past	小樓殘夢	Julie	
1977	Judgement of an Assassin	決殺令	Shi Mingzhu	
1977	The Sentimental Swordsman	多情劍客無情劍	Lin Xian'er	
1978	Clan of Amazons	绣花大盜	Xue Bing	
1978	Third Prince Na Cha	哪吒三太子		
1978	Legend of the Bat	蝙蝠傳奇	Liu Wumei	
1978	Heaven Sword and Dragon Sabre	倚天屠龍記	Zhao Min	
1978	Swordsman and Enchantress	蕭十一郎	Shen Bijun	
1979	Murder Plot	孔雀王朝	Zhu Qiqi	
1980	Disco Bumpkins	摩登土佬	Celina	
1980	The Convict Killer	插翅難飛	Shang Lin	
1980	Haunted Tales	碟仙	Ya Li	Segment 1
1980	Fight for Glory	絕代英雄	Long Xue'er	
1980	Bat Without Wings	無翼蝙蝠	Sima Dongcheng	
1981	Return of the Sentimental Swordsman	魔劍俠情	Lin Shiyin	
1981	Fifteen Lady Gamblers	沙家十五女英豪		
1981	Sword Stained with Royal Blood	碧血劍	Wen Yi	
1981	The King of Gambler	賭王鬥千王	Seventh Girl	
1981	The Imperial Sword Killing the Devil	御劍伏魔		
1981	The Casino	大賭場		
1981	Ten Judges of the Underworld	十殿閻羅	Bai Suzhen	
1981	The Duel of the Century	陸小鳳之決戰前後	Leng Qingqiu	
1981	The Brave Archer 3	射鵰英雄傳第三集	Liu Ying	
1982	The Stunning Gambling	賭王千王群英會		
1982	Bloody Mission	血旗變	White Lotus	
1982	Raiders	雜牌大進擊		
1983	The Roving Swordsman	大俠沈勝衣	Bu Yanfei	
1983	Shaolin and Wu Tang	少林與武當	Yue Lam	

=== TV series ===
Year	English title	Original title	Role	Notes
1985	Jade Buddha Light	玉佛心燈	Princess Yu	
1985	Chor Lau-heung	楚留香新傳	Susu	
2010	My Little Pony	Friendship Is Magic	Twilight Sparkle	
