= Legend of the Liquid Sword =

Legend of the Liquid Sword may refer to:

- Legend of the Liquid Sword (album), by GZA, 2002
- Legend of the Liquid Sword (film), a 1993 Hong Kong film by Wong Jing
