= Middle Kingdom's Mark of Blood =

1980 Hong Kong-Taiwanese film by Hsiao Mu

- DVD cover art
- 中原一點紅
- Directed by: Hsiao Mu
- Screenplay by: Hai Liang; Yeh Kun-shen
- Story by: Gu Long
- Produced by: Chou Ming-yang; Liao Yi-sheng
- Starring: Ling Yun
- Cinematography: Liao Wan-wen
- Edited by: Chiang Huang-Hsiung
- Music by: Huang Mou-Shan
- Production companies: Ta Hsin Films; Nan Chiang Films
- Distributed by: Mei Ah Entertainment; Dreamscape Entertainment Television
- Release date: 1980
- Running time: 90 minutes
- Countries: Hong Kong; Taiwan
- Language: Mandarin

Middle Kingdom's Mark of Blood (中原一點紅), also known as Red Dot Chivalry and The Red Mark of Death, is a 1980 Hong Kong–Taiwanese wuxia film. The story is a cross-over between two novel series by Gu Long: the Lu Xiaofeng Series and Chu Liuxiang Series. The titular character, Zhongyuan Yidianhong (literally "A Red Dot in the Central Plains"), is from the Chu Liuxiang Series, while the story itself is adapted from the novel Juezhan Qianhou of the Lu Xiaofeng Series.

== Cast ==
- Ling Yun as Zhongyuan Yidianhong
- Tin Hok as Chu Liuxiang
- Doris Lung as Ouyang Feng
- Betty Pei as Liu Wumei
- Cheng Hsi-keng as Hu Tiehua
- Wang Hsieh as Du Shengtian
- Lo Tik as Ouyang Long
- Si Sin-dai as Thirteenth Aunt
- Kon Tak-mun as Honest Monk

== Distribution ==
Middle Kingdom's Mark of Blood was fully restored and released by Mei Ah Entertainment. It was dubbed in Cantonese and was aired by Asia Television. In the Philippines, the film was distributed by Dreamscape Entertainment Television.
