= Clan of Amazons =

1978 Hong Kong film by Chor Yuen

- DVD cover art
- 陸小鳳之繡花大盜
- Directed by: Chor Yuen
- Screenplay by: Chor Yuen
- Based on: Xiuhua Dadao by Gu Long
- Produced by: Run Run Shaw
- Starring: Tony Liu
- Cinematography: Wong Chit
- Edited by: Chiang Hsing-lung; Yu Siu-fung
- Music by: Frankie Chan
- Production company: Shaw Brothers Studio
- Distributed by: Shaw Brothers Studio
- Release date: 19 February 1978
- Running time: 88 minutes
- Country: Hong Kong
- Language: Mandarin

Clan of Amazons (陸小鳳之繡花大盜), also known as Clan of the Amazons, is a 1978 Hong Kong wuxia film adapted from the novel Xiuhua Dadao of the Lu Xiaofeng Series by Gu Long. The film was directed by Chor Yuen, produced by the Shaw Brothers Studio, and starred Tony Liu as Lu Xiaofeng.

== Cast ==
- Tony Liu as Lu Xiaofeng
- Ching Li as Xue Bing
- Ling Yun as Jin Jiuling
- Elliot Ngok as Hua Manlou
- Shih Szu as Jiang Qingxia
- Norman Chui as Jiang Chongwei
- Deborah Lee as Ouyang Qing
- Mannor Chan as Gongsun First Sister
- Cheung Ying as Serpent King
- Ngai Fei as Sikong Zhaixing
- Lam Fai-wong as Sikong Zhaihua
- Ku Kuan-chung as Lu Shaohua
- Ouyang Sha-fei as Mrs Xue
- Yeung Chi-hing as Chang Mantian
- Teresa Ha as Gongsun Second Sister
- Lau Wai-ling as Gongsun Fifth Sister
- Chong Lee as Gongsun Sixth Sister
- Kara Hui as Gongsun Seventh Sister
- Chan Shen as Lu Wenhu
