= Legendary Swordsman =

Legendary Swordsman may refer to:

- The Denouncement of Chu Liu Hsiang, alternate title Legendary Swordsman, a 1983 Hong Kong film
- The Legendary Swordsman, a 2000 Singaporean TV series
