= Everlasting Chivalry =

1980 Taiwanese film by Li Chao-yung

- DVD cover art
- 俠影留香
- Directed by: Li Chao-yung
- Screenplay by: Chu Hsiang-kan
- Based on: Chu Liuxiang Series by Gu Long
- Produced by: Hsu Tsai-lai
- Starring: Meng Fei
- Cinematography: Yip Ching-biu
- Edited by: Wong Chau-gwai
- Music by: Wen Long-hsin
- Production company: Xinhai
- Release date: 16 February 1980 (Taiwan)
- Running time: 90 minutes
- Country: Taiwan
- Language: Mandarin

Everlasting Chivalry (俠影留香) is a 1980 Taiwanese wuxia film directed by Li Chao-yung, starring Meng Fei and Doris Lung.

== Cast ==
- Meng Fei as Chu Liuxiang
- Doris Lung as Chu Lian
