= Big Land, Flying Eagles =

1978 film

- Directed by: Ulysses Au-Yeung Jun
- Screenplay by: Ni Kuang; Chiu Kang-Chien; Lin Chi-Jan
- Story by: Gu Long
- Produced by: Tai Chen-Kuo; Yeh Ying-Han
- Starring: Wang Kuan-Hsiung; Ling Yun; Paul Chang Chung; Sek Fung
- Cinematography: Liao Ching-sung
- Production companies: Hwa Hong Motion Picture Co., Ltd.
- Distributed by: New Asia Movie Co., Ltd.
- Release date: 1978
- Running time: 93 minutes
- Country: Taiwan
- Language: Mandarin

Big Land, Flying Eagles (Mandarin: 大地飛鷹 Dàdì fēi yīng; literally, Earth Eagle) is a 1978 Taiwanese spaghetti western sequel desert intrigue adventure martial arts film directed by Ulysses Au-Yeung Jun. The film introduces Wang Kuan-Hsiung, Ling Yun, Paul Chang Chung and Sek Fung in lead roles.

== Plot ==
Xiao Fung, a notable swordsman, has killed the son of local warlord Lee San, and the 3,000,000 tael that Lee’s son was transporting seems to be missing. Xiao Fung is marked for death by Lee San but finds protection from Killer Eagle, a swordsman of great repute, and a band of nomadic Mongolian traders. Lee sends killers of unusual backgrounds, including Buddhist monks, to hunt Xiao Fung down. Xiao Fung seems preoccupied with a woman who is embroiled in unstated conflicts with almost everybody.

== Cast ==
- Wang Kuan-Hsiung as Xiao Fung
- Ling Yun as Bu Ying
- Paul Chang Chung as Lee San
- Sek Fung as Bancha Banou
- Lee Seung as Shui Yin
- Lily Lan Yu-Li as Bo Wa
- Liu Ping as Wei Tian-Peng
- Ha Ling-Ling as Yang Guang
- Huang Hsiang-Lien
- Chang Chi-Ping as Blind fighter
- Ching Kuo-Chung as Mongolian fighter
- Cheung Cheung
- Li Min-Lang as Mongolian fighter
- O Yau-Man as Abbot
- Wang Tai-Lang
- Ko Pooi-Hei
- Ng Ho
- Cheng Fu-Hung
- Wong Wai
- Tang Chia-Chuan as Monk
- Cheung Shu-Lam
- Leung Fung
- Hau Lung
- Hung Bo-Chu
- Lui Wan-Biu

== Production ==
This film is set on the Mongolian-Chinese border.

== Reception ==
The film received a mixed reception.
