= Last Duel =

Last Duel may refer to:

- The Last Duel (1981 film), Taiwanese martial arts drama; original title 英雄對英雄
- Last Duel (video game), 1988 Japanese vertical scrolling shooter by Capcom
- The Last Duel: A True Story of Crime, Scandal, and Trial by Combat in Medieval France, 2004 book by American medievalist Eric Jager
- Pushkin: The Last Duel (2006 film), Russian drama about Pushkin's death
- The Last Duel, 2010 French short film about the last duel in England, aka Le Dernier Duel
- The Last Duel (2021 film), British-American historical drama based on Jager's 2004 book
- The Last Duel (miniseries), a 2026 Thai historical miniseries
