= Bastard Swordsman =

1983 Hong Kong film by Lu Chin-ku

- Traditional Chinese: 天蠶變
- Simplified Chinese: 天蚕变
- Hanyu Pinyin: Tiān Cán Biàn
- Directed by: Lu Chun-ku
- Written by: Lu Chun-ku
- Produced by: Mona Fong
- Starring: Norman Chui
- Cinematography: Ma Gam-cheung
- Edited by: So Chan-kwok; Lau Shiu-gwong; Chiang Hsing-lung
- Music by: So Jan-hau; Stephen Shing
- Production company: Shaw Brothers Studio
- Distributed by: Shaw Brothers Studio
- Release date: 14 September 1983
- Country: Hong Kong
- Language: Mandarin

Bastard Swordsman, also known as Reincarnate Swordsman, is a 1983 Hong Kong wuxia film produced by the Shaw Brothers Studio.

== Plot ==
Yun Fei Yang is the viciously bullied orphan who takes on the unpleasant tasks at a formidable kung-fu school. Constantly mocked by the other students of the school, Yun counts as his only friend the daughter of the resident master. Any internal wrangling between the various members is put to one side when a swordsman from a rival clan reminds the master of the duel he must take part in once a decade. Unfortunately the defending clan chief is well aware that his rival is more powerful than himself. The expected defeat is further complicated when a wandering swordsman arrives on the scene and joins himself to the injured party, immediately adding to Yun's woes.

The ensuing series of confrontations and intrigues soon reveals the individual motives that the numerous parties all have and the role they play in the fate of the martial world. After finally understanding his own past and upbringing, Yun is ready to take on the mantle of avenger for his school and win back the respect that his colleagues have lost. With fighting skills that had been taught to him by a shrouded figure, Yun steps out of the shadows and reveals himself to be anything but the harassed orphan that everyone enjoys picking on. However to have any kind of hope against his nearly superhuman foes, the young fighter must uncover the secrets of his clan's 'Silkworm Technique' and transform himself completely.

== Cast ==
- Norman Chui as Yun Fei Yang
- Tony Liu as Fu Yu Shu
- Wong Yung as Chief Qing Song
- Leanne Liu as Lun Wan Er
- Alex Man as Chief Dugu Wu Di
- Yeung Jing-jing as Dugu Fang Er
- Chan Si-gai as Shen Man Jiun
- Ku Kuan-chung as Bai Sek
- Lo Mang as Kung Suen Wang
- Kwan Fung as Lightning
- Yuen Qiu as Rain
- Yuen Tak as Wind
- Wong Lik as Thunder
- Wilson Tong as Yen Zhong Tian
- Lau Siu-gwan as Yao Feng
- Sun Chien as Xie Ping
- Tong Chun-chung as Jin Sek
- Siao Yuk as Yu Sek
- Chan Shen as Guardian of the Law
- Wong Ching-ho as Guardian of the Law
- Chan Yuet-yue as Invincible Clan Chief
- Chan Lau as Invincible Clan Chief
- Pak Sha-lik as Invincible Clan Chief
- Yiu Man-gei as Invincible Clan Chief
- Cheung Chok-chow as Invincible Clan Chief
- Shum Lo as Thundering Prognosticator
- Lam Chi-tai as Qing Song's servant
- Ngai Tim-choi as Qing Song's servant
- Lui Tat as Wu Dang member
- Wan Seung-lam as Wu Dang member
- Kong Long as Wu Dang member
- Cheung Sek-au as monk
- Gam Tin-chue as extra
- Ma Zongde

== Production ==
Bastard Swordsman is based on the 1979 ATV television series Reincarnated.

In 1983, Norman Chui, who owned the rights to a film adaption of Reincarnated, initially planned to film the adaption with his own production company 新金城电影公司. The rights were eventually given to Shaw Brothers to film it with Chui reprising his role in the film.

Director Lu Chun-ku said that the film was targeted at the Taiwan audience.

== Reception ==
The film broke Taiwan's box office record on the first day of release in Taiwan with NTD 3 million. Lu attributed the success to the television series Reincarnated being shown at Taiwan at that moment and the audience was curious of the ending of the television series.

== Sequel ==
As a result of the box office success on the first day, Shaw Brothers shelved Lu's movie, a film adaption of Woon Swee Oan's Buyi Shenxiang series (布衣神相系列), and Lu was to film a sequel immediately.

A sequel, Return of the Bastard Swordsman, was released on 22 March 1984, with Lu returning as director. Chui reprise his role from Bastard Swordsman. The film was adapted from Buyi Shenxiang and Reincarnated.
