= Norman Chui =

Hong Kong actor (1950–2024)

- 徐少強
- Born: 16 October 1950; British Hong Kong
- Died: 1 September 2024 (aged 73); Beijing, China
- Other name: Norman Tsui
- Occupation: Actor
- Years active: 1973–2024
- Height: 1.8 m (5 ft 11 in)
- Spouses: Zhang Xiaofeng (m. 1975; div. 1979) Ho Suk Foon (m. 1980; div. 1982) Meng Yuxuan (m. 2005; died 2024)
- Partner: Sidney Yim (1982-1988)
- Children: Keian Chui with Ho; Edward Chui and; Erica Chui with Yim; 2 with Meng

Chinese name
- Traditional Chinese: 徐少強
- Simplified Chinese: 徐少强
Transcriptions
Standard Mandarin
- Hanyu Pinyin: Xú Shàoqiáng
Yue: Cantonese
- Jyutping: ceoi4 siu3 koeng4

Norman Chui Siu-keung (16 October 1950 – 1 September 2024) was a Hong Kong actor. He was best known for portraying heroic protagonists in many martial arts films from the 1970s to 1980s and later portraying villainous roles in the 1990s. Chui was under contract with Asia Television during the 1990s and mostly acted in mainland China thereafter.

== Career ==
After graduating from secondary school, Chui worked as a debt collector. He then worked as an accounting clerk managing financial products at a stockbroker.

With encouragement from his colleagues, Chui joined Shaw Brothers Studio's third actor training class in 1972. He graduated and entered the industry as a stuntman. In the 1970s, martial arts film were popular and Chui often appeared as a hero in films. In 1976, Chui portrayed Zhan Zhao in Rediffusion Television's (RTV) adaption of The Seven Heroes and Five Gallants which led to an offer from a television station to hire him as their actor, however the deal fell through.

In 1977, Chui acted in Death Duel, a film adaptation from the novel Third Young Master's Sword (三少爺的劍) by Gu Long. The following year, Chui received much attention from his cameo appearance in the RTV drama series, 大丈夫. As a result, Shaw Brothers permitted Chui to act in RTV's productions.

In 1979, Chui played the eponymous lead role of Shen Shengyi (沈胜衣) in the television series The Roving Swordsman (沈胜衣) by RTV. After the series was shown in Thailand, Chui attracted a Thai following with Thai fans flying to Hong Kong to meet him.

After joining RTV, Chui was mainly portrayed as a hero in dramas such as Reincarnated (1979). Reincarnated boosted his reputation and gained popularity in Taiwan. RTV had suffered poor television ratings prior the show, but then experienced a boost in its ratings and surpassed its rival television station TVB resulting in the cancellation of its prime-time programming. Leveraging on the popularity of Reincarnated, RTV requested Chui to act in 30 additional episodes. Due to Chui's popularity, he was often acting in other films and had little time to continue filming the extension. Eventually, he abandoned his commitments to RTV, forcing a stoppage to further filming of Reincarnated. As a result, RTV used the plot of Reincarnated but replaced Chui with lead actor Koo Koon Chung. There was a marked difference in the change of the character's appearance and martial arts skills.

In 1980, Chui acted in On the Water Front which was released in March. In April, Chui signed a two year contract with Bin Bin Films (繽繽電影). After the series On the Water Front, Chui did not appear in any RTV's productions, leading to speculations that he was out of favour with RTV. Chui denied the rumours, explaining that he was busy with other projects and had rejected two television series to prevent a similar incident with Reincarnated.

In December, RTV and Chui had a falling out, resulting in RTV refusing to pay Chui his salary and preventing him from working with other television stations. Chui had also hired two lawyers to seek compensation, and to allow him work from other television stations. It was alleged that Bin Bin Films was the reason for Chui's fall out with RTV. RTV then filed a breach of contract lawsuit against Chui. The network initially sought HKD 350,000 in compensation, which they later increased to HKD 600,000. RTV alleged that Chui had avoided obligations in order to work on other films. Since he had abandoned Reincarnated, it resulted in shooting delays and a forced subsequent change of the male lead. The change led to companies pulling their advertisements from RTV. Because Chui was filming in Thailand during the trial, the judge initially ruled in RTV's favour, however Chui later successfully appealed for a retrial. Chui and RTV eventually settled out-of-court, and Chui returned to RTV later that year. In February, Chui's contract with RTV expired. While RTV sought to renew Chiu's contract, Chiu chose to take on other film projects and rejected their offers.

In April 1981, Chui and Bin Bin Films mutually agreed to terminate their contract, as Chui desired to co-found an independent film production company. Bin Bin Films agreed to the termination if Chui agreed to complete his remaining two film obligations and to prioritise any future production requests from Bin Bin Films.

In 1983, Chui, who owned the rights to a film adaptation of Reincarnated, initially planned to film the adaptation with his own film production company Gold City Film Company 金城影业公司. The rights were eventually given to Shaw Brothers who produced it with Chui reprising his role under the new title Bastard Swordsman. The film broke Taiwan's box office record on the first day of its release making NTD 3 million. A sequel was immediately commissioned by Shaw Brothers, with director Lu Chun-ku to commence production of the sequel immediately and to shelf his next film, a film adaptation of Woon Swee Oan's Buyi Shenxiang series (布衣神相系列). The sequel, Return of the Bastard Swordsman, was released on 22 March 1984, with Lu returning as director and Chui reprising the lead role. The film was adapted from Buyi Shenxiang and Reincarnated.

Chui had acted in over 100 film and television productions. He was known for playing protagonists in his early career, then pivoted to be known for his villainous roles later in his career in films such as Stephen Chow's King of Beggars.

In 1993, Asia Television, formerly RTV, produced the sequel Reincarnated II with Chui reprising his role.

Following the decline in Hong Kong's film industry in the late 1990s, Chui moved to Beijing, China to work on Chinese dramas.

=== Filmmaking ===
In 1982, Chui with Wilson Tong Wai-Shing and Gordon Liu formed a film production company Gold City Film Company 金城影业公司. They eventually split their partnership. In 1987, Chui with Liu, formed another film company, 吸引力電影製作. In the same year, Chui also formed another film company 海港影業 with help from investors.

== Personal life ==
Chui married Zhang Xiaofeng (張小鳳) in 1975. After incompatibility issues, they separated shortly in 1976 and divorced in 1979.

In 1980, Chui married his second wife Ho Suk Foon (何淑寬) and they have a son, Keian Chui (徐梓耀), who would later work as a content creator in the advertising and entertainment industries in Hong Kong.

In 1982, Chui had an affair with actress Sidney Yim, the younger sister of actress Michelle Yim,. They have one son Edward Chui and a daughter Erica Chui. Chui and Yim ended their relationship in 1988.

In 2005 Chui married a Chinese dancer Meng Yuxuan (孟雨軒), who was about 30 years his junior. They have a daughter and a son.

Chui died from esophageal cancer in Beijing, on 1 September 2024, at the age of 73. While handling his funeral arrangements, his widow Meng Yuxuan suffered a heart attack and died four days later on 5 September 2024. The funerals for Chui and Meng were held at the Universal Funeral Parlour in Hung Hom, Hong Kong on 5 October 2024.

== Filmography ==
=== Films ===
This is a partial list of films.

- 1974 The Savage Five – Da Niu
- 1977 The Battle Wizard – Gu Ducheng
- 1977 Death Duel – Crow
- 1977 Clans of Intrigue – Song Gang
- 1978 Clan of Amazons – Jiang Chongwei
- 1978 Legend of the Bat – Xiang Feitian
- 1978 Vengeful Beauty – Ma Seng
- 1978 Heaven Sword and Dragon Sabre – Wei Yixiao
- 1978 The Brave Archer 2 – Qiu Chuji
- 1979 Abbot of Shaolin – Li Jin Lun
- 1978 Heroes of the East – Chang
- 1980 The Sword – Lin Wan
- 1982 Phet Tud Yok – Thai film
- 1982 Ghost Nursing
- 1983 The Denouncement of Chu Liu Hsiang – Murong Qingcheng
- 1983 Duel to the Death – Hashimoto
- 1983 Zu Warriors from the Magic Mountain – Heaven's Blade
- 1983 Bastard Swordsman – Yun Fei Yang
- 1984 Return of the Bastard Swordsman – Yun Fei Yang
- 1984 Demi-Gods and Semi-Devils – Qiao/Xiao Feng
- 1985 Hong Kong Godfather – Playboy Lung
- 1987 Flaming Brothers – Chiu
- 1988 The Dragon Family – Keung
- 1988 City War – Ted Yiu
- 1991 Au Revoir, Mon Amour – Tit Chak Man
- 1992 King of Beggars – Chiu Mo-kei
- 1993 Legend of the Liquid Sword – Dugu Qiubai
- 2000 The Duel
- 2016 Sword Master – Cult Leader

=== Television series ===
- 1979 Reincarnated – Yun Fei Yang
- 1980 On the Water Front – Yun Fei Yang
- 1993 Reincarnated II – Yun Fei Yang
- 1994 Heroic Legend of the Yang's Family – Yang Zongbao
- 1994 The Great General – Yang Zongbao
- 1996 The Snow is Red – Wan Tien Xing
- 1998 The Return of the Condor Heroes – Lu Zhanyuan / Gongsun Zhi
- 1998 Master Ma – Xue Changchun
- 2000 State of Divinity – Xiang Wentian
- 2001 The New Adventures of Chor Lau-heung – Xue Xiaoren
- 2008 Legend of the Fist: Chen Zhen – Satō Kashirakawa (Zuoteng Bachuan)
- 2010 The Patriotic Knights – Meng Shen Tong
- 2021 Word of Honor – Bi Cangfeng
