= Man of Iron (1972 film) =

1972 Hong Kong film by Chang Cheh and Pao Hsueh-li

- Film poster
- Directed by: Chang Cheh; Pao Hsueh-li
- Written by: Chang Cheh; Ni Kuang
- Produced by: Run Run Shaw
- Starring: Chen Kuan Tai; Cheng Li; Wong Chung; Zhu Mu; Tin Ching
- Cinematography: Yuen Teng-Bong
- Edited by: Kwok Ting-Hung
- Music by: Frankie Chan
- Production company: Shaw Brothers Studio
- Release date: 14 October 1972 (Hong Kong)
- Running time: 95 minutes
- Country: Hong Kong
- Language: Mandarin

Man of Iron is a 1972 Hong Kong film by Shaw Brothers Studio. It was co-directed by Chang Cheh and Pao Hsueh-li.

== Cast ==
- Chen Kuan Tai
- Cheng Li
- Wong Chung
- Zhu Mu
- Tin Ching
- Yeung Chi Hing
- Bolo Yeung Tze
- Lo Dik
- Wong Ching
- Tino Wong Cheung
- Alexander Fu Sheng - as young man with a bicycle (extra)
