= Chu Liu Hsiang and Hu Tieh Hua =

1980 Taiwanese film by Lin Ying

- Film poster
- 楚留香與胡鐵花
- Directed by: Lin Ying; Gu Long
- Written by: Gu Long
- Produced by: Gu Long; Lin Chi-feng
- Starring: Liu Dekai; James Tien
- Cinematography: Liao Wan-wen
- Edited by: Chiang Huang-Hsiung
- Music by: Huang Mao-Shan
- Production company: Bao Lung Film Company
- Release date: 11 September 1980 (Taiwan)
- Running time: 85 minutes
- Country: Taiwan
- Language: Mandarin

Chu Liu Hsiang and Hu Tieh Hua (楚留香與胡鐵花) is a 1980 Taiwanese wuxia film directed by Lin Ying. It is adapted from the novel Da Shamo of the Chu Liuxiang Series by Gu Long, who also wrote the screenplay, produced and co-directed the film.

== Synopsis ==
The film follows the adventures of Chu Liuxiang and his friend Hu Tiehua as they travel to the Gobi Desert and encounter hostile forces.

== Cast ==
- Liu Dekai as Chu Liuxiang
- James Tien as Hu Tiehua
