= The Legend of Lu Xiaofeng (2007 TV series) =

2007 Chinese TV series

- VCD cover art
- 陆小凤传奇
- Genre: Wuxia
- Based on: Lu Xiaofeng Series by Gu Long
- Screenplay by: Qiu Huaiming; Wu Zheng; Gong Xiangdong; Ma Shuai; Huang Jiandong; Yan Gang; Yu Miao; Huang Yonghui
- Directed by: Yuen Ying-ming; Billy Tang
- Starring: Julian Cheung; Ken Chang; Cheung Tat-ming; Peter Ho; Yan Kuan; Fann Wong
- Ending theme: "Twin Heroes" (双侠) by Maxam
- Country of origin: China
- Original language: Mandarin
- No. of episodes: 20

Production
- Production location: China
- Running time: ≈ 45 minutes per episode

Original release
- Network: CCTV-6
- Release: 10 January – 14 March 2007

The Legend of Lu Xiaofeng (陆小凤传奇) is a 2007 Chinese wuxia television series adapted from the Lu Xiaofeng Series by Gu Long, starring Hong Kong actor-singer Julian Cheung as Lu Xiaofeng. It was first broadcast on CCTV-6.

== List of episodes ==
The series is divided into ten story arcs: seven are adapted from Gu Long's novels, while the other three (marked with asterisks) were created by the screenwriters. Each story arc spans two episodes.

1. Lu Xiaofeng - The Prequel (陆小凤前传)*
2. The Embroidery Bandit (绣花大盗)
3. Before and After the Duel (决战前后)
4. The Silver Hook Gambling House (银钩赌坊)
5. Phantoms' Mountain Manor (幽灵山庄)
6. The Phoenix Dances in the Nine Heavens (凤舞九天)
7. Laughter of the God of Sword (剑神一笑)
8. Legend of the Iron Shoe (铁鞋传奇)*
9. The Kingdom of the Golden Bird (大金鹏王)
10. Mystery of the Blood Garment (血衣之谜)*

== Cast ==
- Julian Cheung as Lu Xiaofeng
- Ken Chang as Hua Manlou
- Cheung Tat-ming as Sikong Zhaixing
- Peter Ho as Ximen Chuixue
- Yan Kuan as Ye Gucheng
- Fann Wong as Sha Man
- Cecilia Liu as Sun Xiuqing
- Wong Yat-fei as Guisun Daye
- Cynthia Khan as Wuyan
- Berg Ng as Jin Jiuling
- Hugo Ng as Jiang Chongwei
- Lam Chung as Mu Daoren / Laodao Bazi
- Li Mei as Ye Xue
- Zhu Hong as Xue Bing
- Wu Jiani as Shangguan Danfeng / Shangguan Feiyan
- Bai Yan'an as Gong Susu
- Lin Han as Xia'er
- He Dandan as Ouyang Qing
- Li Qian as Niuroutang
