= Perils of the Sentimental Swordsman =

1982 Hong Kong film by Chor Yuen

- DVD cover art
- 楚留香之幽靈山莊
- Directed by: Chor Yuen
- Written by: Chor Yuen; Gu Long
- Produced by: Mona Fong
- Starring: Ti Lung
- Cinematography: Wong Chit
- Edited by: Ma Chung-yiu; Yu Kwok-fung
- Music by: Stephen Shing; So Jan-hau
- Production company: Shaw Brothers Studio
- Distributed by: Shaw Brothers Studio
- Release date: 13 May 1982
- Running time: 87 minutes
- Country: Hong Kong
- Language: Mandarin
- Box office: HK$1,331,496.00

Perils of the Sentimental Swordsman (楚留香之幽靈山莊) is a 1982 Hong Kong wuxia film directed by Chor Yuen, produced by the Shaw Brothers Studio, and starring Ti Lung. The story is adapted from the novel Youling Shanzhuang of the Lu Xiaofeng Series by Gu Long, but the main character Lu Xiaofeng has been replaced by Chu Liuxiang, the main character of the Chu Liuxiang Series, which is also by Gu Long. The film was preceded by Clans of Intrigue (1977) and Legend of the Bat (1978), which were adapted from the Chu Liuxiang Series.

== Synopsis ==
Chu Liuxiang attempts to assassinate the Eighth Prince but fails and is pursued by the prince's men. He has no choice but to seek refuge in the sinister Phantoms' Mountain Manor, which houses criminals and people who have committed wicked deeds. In fact, Chu and the prince have staged the assassination attempt to fool the evil residents of the manor, so that Chu can infiltrate the manor and eliminate them.

== Cast ==
- Ti Lung as Chu Liuxiang
- Teng Wei-hao as Long Wu
- Ku Kuan-chung as Liu Changjie
- Lo Lieh as Xuanyuan Siguang
- Linda Chu as General
- Tai Liang-chun as Zhong Ling
- Ku Feng as Old Hawk
- Lau Siu-kwan as Cousin
- Yeung Chi-hing as Dugu Mei
- Cheng Miu as Eight Prince
- Alan Chan as Du Qi
- Yuen Tak as Zhou Bailong
- Kwan Fung as Lan Meng
