= It Takes a Thief (1979 TV series) =

1979 Hong Kong TV series

- 俠盜風流
- Genre: Wuxia
- Based on: Chu Liuxiang Series by Gu Long
- Directed by: Lee Wai-man; Siu Hin-fai
- Starring: Pat Poon; Kenneth Tsang; Paul Chun; Alex Man; Bonnie Ngai; Law Lok-lam; Mary Cheung; Man Man-yee; Wen Hsueh-erh; Yuen Pui-jan; Miu Kam-fung; Chan Yuen-mei; Yung Wai-man; Nancy Sit; Choi King-fai
- Opening theme: "Charming Heroic Bandit" (俠盜風流) by Amy Chan
- Ending theme: "Xiao's Tune Resonates with My Heart" (簫韻寄心聲) by Nancy Sit
- Composer: Michael Lai
- Country of origin: Hong Kong
- Original language: Cantonese
- No. of episodes: 8

Production
- Executive producer: Kong Lung
- Producers: Johnny Mak; Tsui Hark
- Production location: Hong Kong
- Running time: ≈ 60 minutes per episode
- Production company: RTV

Original release
- Network: RTV
- Release: 1 September 1979 – 1979

It Takes a Thief (俠盜風流) is a Hong Kong wuxia television series adapted from the Chu Liuxiang Series by Gu Long. The series was first broadcast on RTV (now ATV) in Hong Kong in September 1979.

== Lawsuit with TVB ==
The series' original Chinese title was 盜帥留香. It was released around the same time as Chor Lau-heung, a similar television series produced by TVB. RTV and TVB became involved in copyright lawsuits against each other because of similarities between It Takes a Thief and Chor Lau-heung. TVB won the lawsuits and eventually RTV had to change the Chinese title of It Takes a Thief to 俠盜風流, as well as the characters' names. It Takes a Thief started airing on 1 September 1979, two days before TVB's Chor Lau-heung.

== Cast ==
- Pat Poon as Daoshuai (Chu Liuxiang)
- Bonnie Ngai as Du Hongjuan (Su Rongrong)
- Paul Chun as Wuchen (Wuhua)
- Kenneth Tsang as Gong Bingyan (Ji Bingyan)
- Law Lok-lam as Jianghu Yidianhong (Zhongyuan Yidianhong)
- Alex Man as Nangong Yi (Nangong Ling)
- Lau Kwok-sing as Gu Tiehua (Hu Tiehua)
- Ma Man-yee as Chu Xiangyun (Shen Shangu)
- Mary Cheung as Gong Nanfei (Gong Nanyan)
- Wen Hsueh-erh as Heihupo (Heizhenzhu)
- Cheung Ying as Shichen
- Yuen Pui-jan as Ye Xiaoxian (Li Hongxiu)
- Chan Yuen-mei as Liu Zhenzhen (Song Tian'er)
- Miu Kam-fung as Qiu Hongye (Qing Lingsu)
- Nancy Sit as Princess Longxiao (Princess Pipa)
- Yung Wai-man as Qu Wuchou (Qu Wurong)
- Kwan Suet-lai as Jinpusa (Shiguanyin)
- Yik Kar as Shangguan Jing (Zhangsun Hong)
- See Ming as Shangguan Yan
- Miu Kar-lai as Queen of Yanxia (Queen of Loulan)
- Choi King-fai as Leng Wumei (Liu Wumei)
- Mannor Chan as Shuimu Tianji (Shuimu Yinji)
- Leung Tin as Biyu Mogai
- Yip Tin-hang as Tianfeng Shisilang
- Wong Wai as Zhajin'er (Zhamuhe)
- Ling Man-hoi as King of Yanxia (King of Loulan)
- Cheung Hoi-yiu as Du Fan (Du Huai)
- Cheng Lui as General Min
- Kui Ngok as Hong Tongguo
- Ma Tsung-tak as Liu Feiyan
- Eddy Ko as Situ Liuxing
- Lee Tin-ying as Mai Zhentian
- Ng Wing-sum as Qinghuzi
- Mok Hing-chung as Long Jianfei
- Ma Chung-tak as Xu Fengmu
- Ng Tung as Li Guanyu
- Lee Gong as Li Xueheng (Li Yuhan)
- Yuen Wai-hung as Jinhouzi (Sunhouzi)
- Cheung Hung-cheung as Ouyang Yu
- Tung Piu as Wu Juxuan
- Man Chin-sui as Shangguan Xun
- Lam Kam-tong as Tie'er Shenbu
- Nora Miao as Gao Ya (Gao Ya'nan)
