= Legend of the Bat =

1978 Hong Kong film by Chor Yuen

- Film poster
- 楚留香之蝙蝠傳奇
- Directed by: Chor Yuen
- Screenplay by: Chor Yuen
- Story by: Gu Long
- Produced by: Mona Fong
- Starring: Ti Lung; Ling Yun; Elliot Ngok; Derek Yee; Ching Li; Wong Chung; Candice Yu
- Cinematography: Wong Chit
- Edited by: Yu Siu-fung; Chiang Hsing-lung
- Music by: Frankie Chan
- Production company: Shaw Brothers Studio
- Release date: 8 July 1978
- Running time: 101 minutes
- Country: Hong Kong
- Language: Mandarin

Legend of the Bat (楚留香之蝙蝠傳奇), also known as Bat Island Adventure or Clans of Intrigue 2, is a 1978 Hong Kong wuxia film adapted from the novel Bianfu Chuanqi of the Chu Liuxiang Series by Gu Long. The film was directed and written by Chor Yuen, produced by the Shaw Brothers Studio, and starred Ti Lung as Chu Liuxiang. It was preceded by Clans of Intrigue (1977) and followed by Perils of the Sentimental Swordsman (1982).

== Synopsis ==
Chu Liuxiang and Zhongyuan Yidianhong pass by a shipwreck and meet Master Kumei. They also discover that a group of highly-skilled martial artists have been murdered at a gathering in Siming Mountain Manor. The only survivor is a man called Yuan Suifeng, who has become insane after being severely injured. They hear of Bat Island, a mysterious place where anyone can buy anything they desire as long as they have money. Chu and his friends travel to the island to seek answers. However, they are not the only ones going there: Li Yuhan and his wife, Liu Wuming, are there in search of an extraordinary drug; Jin Lingzhi is there to find her father; a group of imperial guards are there to arrest the island's master.

== Cast ==
- Ti Lung as Chu Liuxiang
- Ling Yun as Zhongyuan Yidianhong
- Derek Yee as Yuan Suiyun
- Elliot Ngok as Li Yuhan
- Ching Li as Liu Wuming
- Wong Chung as Gou Zichang
- Candice Yu as Jin Lingzhi
- Tony Liu as Yuan Suifeng
- Chan Si-gai as Li Hongxiu
- Chong Lee as Song Tian'er
- Norman Chui as Xiang Feitian
- Wang Lai as Kumei
- Lau Wai-ling as Gao Yanan
- Ku Kuan-chung as Ding Feng
- Cheng Miu as Tieshan
- Ngai Fei as Long Wu
- Yang Chih-ching as Gongsun Jieming
- Tang Tak-cheung as Wugen
