= The Sun Moon Legend =

1980 Taiwanese film by Wang Yu

- DVD cover art
- 新月傳奇
- Directed by: Wang Yu
- Screenplay by: Gu Long
- Based on: Xinyue Chuanqi by Gu Long
- Produced by: Sun Ming-Chuan
- Starring: Meng Fei
- Cinematography: Chiu Yao-Hu
- Edited by: Chiang Huang-Hsiung
- Music by: Fu Li
- Production company: Sunwoo Entertainment
- Release date: 1980
- Running time: 90 minutes
- Country: Taiwan
- Language: Mandarin

The Sun Moon Legend (新月傳奇), also known as The Young Moon Legend, is a 1980 Taiwanese wuxia film adapted from the novel Xinyue Chuanqi of the Chu Liuxiang Series by Gu Long. The film was directed by Wang Yu and starred Meng Fei as Chu Liuxiang.

== Cast ==
- Meng Fei as Chu Liuxiang
- Ling Yun as Prince Arrow
- Wong Goon-hung as Bai Yunsheng
- Sek Fung as Hu Tiehua
- Yeung Gwan-gwan as Crescent
- Grace Chan as Aunt Hua
- Su Chen-ping as Manager Hua
- Got Heung-ting as Chao Lin
- Luk Yat-lung as King Warrior
- Wong Chung-yue as Black Bamboo
