= Ken Chang =

Taiwanese actor and singer

- Born: 8 May 1975 (age 51); Kaohsiung, Taiwan
- Occupations: Actor; singer
- Years active: 1997–present

Chinese name
- Traditional Chinese: 張智堯
- Simplified Chinese: 张智尧
Transcriptions
Standard Mandarin
- Hanyu Pinyin: Zhāng Zhìyáo
Yue: Cantonese
- Jyutping: Zoeng^{1} Zi^{3}-jiu^{4}
- Musical career
- Also known as: Ken Cheung Chi-Yiu; Ken Chong Chi-Yiu
- Origin: Brazil

Ken Chang or Chang Tzu-yao (Chinese: 張智堯) is a Taiwanese actor and Mandopop singer who grew up in Brazil since the age of 3.

== Career ==
In 1998, Chang started his film career in G.Y. Sir, a Taiwanese comedy film. Chang has appeared in Taiwan films and Hong Kong films. Chang has also appeared in television series from mainland China.

== Filmography ==
=== Films ===
Year	Title	Role	Notes/Ref.
1997	G. Y. Sir (超級天兵之機車班長)	Lee Kuo-ji	
1999	Bad Girl Trilogy (惡女列傳)	cop	
1999	Sunshine Cops (陽光警察)	Harry	
1999	Top Gear (小卒戰將)		
2001	The Legend of the Flying Swordsman (小李飛刀之飛刀外傳)		
2001	Top Gear (小卒戰將)		
2001	Extreme Challenge (地上最強)	Kuang Yin	
2001	Sharp Guns (險角)	Wood	
2001	The Accidental Spy (特務迷城)	mall cop	
2002	The Era of Vampires (殭屍大時代)	Hei	
2003	My Lucky Star (行運超人)	Hollywood action star	
2003	Dragon Loaded 2003 (龍咁威2003)	Trainee Zhi	
2005	SPL: Sha Po Lang (殺破狼)	Lee Wai-lok	
2007	Fear Factors (恐懼元素)	Lee Chun-wah	
2015	Come Back, Love		

=== Television ===
Year	Title	Role	Notes
2001	Legendary Fighter: Yang's Heroine (楊門女將之女兒當自強)	Yang Zongbao	
2002	Legend of Heaven and Earth: The Mermaid (天地傳說之魚美人)	Tomodo Tsuyoshi	
2005	When Dolphin Met Cat (海豚愛上貓)	Tang Zhongyue	
2006	The Legend of Lu Xiaofeng (陸小鳳傳奇)	Hua Manlou	
2006	Hong Kong Criminal Files (香港奇案實錄)	Wong Hoi-fong	unit "The Devilish Angel"
2007	The Gold Convoyers (鏢行天下)	Li Yuncong	
2009	The Heaven Sword and Dragon Saber (倚天屠龍記)	Zhang Cuishan	
2012	The Legend of Chu Liuxiang (楚留香新傳)	Chu Liuxiang	
2014	Swords of Legends (古剑奇谭)	Ziyin	
2015	Legend of Fragrance (活色生香)	Ning Haotian	
2015	The Lost Tomb (盗墓笔记)	Wu Sanxing	
2017	Eternal Love (三生三世十里桃花)	Zhe Yan	
2019	Novoland: Eagle Flag (九州缥缈录)	Bai Yi	

== Discography ==
- 1998 – Un dos tres (她是誰)
