= The New Adventures of Chor Lau-heung (2001 TV series) =

2001 Hong Kong–Taiwanese TV series

- DVD cover art
- 新楚留香
- Genre: Wuxia
- Based on: Chu Liuxiang Series by Gu Long
- Directed by: Wong Jing
- Creative director: Shi Wensheng
- Starring: Richie Ren; Ruby Lin; Dicky Cheung; Eric Suen; Ekin Cheng; Gigi Lai; Kristy Yang; Joey Meng; Anita Yuen; Monica Chan; Angie Cheung; Daniel Chan; Kelly Lin
- Opening theme: "The Flower is Too Fragrant" (花太香) by Richie Ren
- Countries of origin: Hong Kong; Taiwan
- Original language: Mandarin
- No. of episodes: 40

Production
- Executive producer: Zheng Weiwen
- Producers: Wong Jing; Wong Tin-lam; Yang Teng-kuei
- Production locations: Taiwan; Hong Kong
- Running time: ≈ 45 minutes per episode
- Production company: Hsin Feng Films

Original release
- Network: CTS; TVB
- Release: 10 December 2001

The New Adventures of Chor Lau-heung (新楚留香) is a Hong Kong–Taiwanese television series adapted from the wuxia novel series by Gu Long, primarily the Chu Liuxiang Series, but also including characters from the Lu Xiaofeng Series and Xiaoli Feidao Series. Starring an ensemble cast from Hong Kong and Taiwan, it was first broadcast on CTS and TVB in Taiwan and Hong Kong respectively in 2001.

== Synopsis ==
"Bandit Chief" Chu Liuxiang breaks into the palace to steal a wooden figurine carved by "Little Li Flying Dagger" Li Xunhuan and encounters Sikong Xing'er, the daughter of the highly-skilled thief Sikong Zhaixing, and her sworn sister Su Rongrong. While escaping from the guards' pursuit, Li Xunhuan dies trying to save Su Rongrong.

Chu Liuxiang and Su Rongrong team up to investigate the theft of the "Heaven and Earth Holy Water" and develop romantic feelings for each other. They travel south later in search of an antidote and to find out the truth about their family backgrounds. Chu Liuxiang discovers that he is actually royalty and should rightfully be king of a southern kingdom. This sparks off a power struggle in the kingdom. During that period of time, Chu Liuxiang starts another romantic relationship with Sikong Xing'er.

On one hand, Chu Liuxiang finds himself torn between Sikong Xing'er and Su Rongrong as his romantic partner. On the other hand, he has to make a decision on whether to claim the throne or continue roaming freely in the jianghu.

== Cast ==
- Richie Ren as Chu Liuxiang
- Ruby Lin as Sikong Xing'er
- Dicky Cheung as Monk Ruchen
- Eric Suen as Luo Wuqing
- Ekin Cheng as Li Xunhuan
- Gigi Lai as Su Rongrong
- Kristy Yang as Xue Keren
- Joey Meng as Princess Yunluo
- Anita Yuen as Song Xihu
- Monica Chan as Feng Nanyan
- Angie Cheung as Shi Fenghuang
- Daniel Chan as the Emperor
- Kelly Lin as Princess Mingzhu
- Ng Man-tat as Sikong Zhaixing
- Jess Zhang as Li Hongxiu
- Mark Cheng as Xue Yiren
- Norman Chui as Xue Xiaoren
- Wayne Lai as Hu Tiehua
- Yang Rui as Song Tian'er
- Gabriel Harrison as Xie Changkong
- Ruco Chan as Wen Liangyu
