= Death Duel =

1977 Hong Kong film by Chor Yuen

- Film poster
- 三少爺的劍
- Directed by: Chor Yuen
- Screenplay by: Chor Yuen
- Based on: San Shaoye De Jian by Gu Long
- Produced by: Runme Shaw
- Starring: Derek Yee; Ling Yun; Candice Yu
- Cinematography: Wong Chit
- Edited by: Chiang Hsing-lung
- Music by: Wang Fu-Ling
- Production company: Shaw Brothers Studio
- Distributed by: Shaw Brothers Studio
- Release date: 7 July 1977
- Running time: 90 minutes
- Country: Hong Kong
- Language: Cantonese
- Box office: HK$1.64 million

Death Duel (三少爺的劍) is a 1977 Hong Kong wuxia film directed by Chor Yuen and produced by the Shaw Brothers Studio. Starring Derek Yee and Ling Yun, the film was also Candice Yu's debut. It was adapted from the novel San Shaoye De Jian (Third Young Master's Sword) by Gu Long, and was remade in 2016 as Sword Master, which was directed by Derek Yee.

== Synopsis ==
Yan Shisan is known for his prowess in swordsmanship throughout the jianghu, and the only one who can match him is Xie Xiaofeng, the third young master of Divine Sword Manor. When he goes to the manor to challenge Xie Xiaofeng, he is disappointed to hear that the young master is dead.

It turns out that Xie Xiaofeng, tired of constantly duelling with challengers seeking to best him, has faked his death and started living as a vagrant roaming the streets. He is taken in by Laomiaozi and his family, and has no choice but to reveal his true identity when he steps in to protect them.

After being poisoned, Xie Xiaofeng is saved by a mysterious, highly-skilled fighter. In a bid to force Xie Xiaofeng and Yan Shisan to duel, their enemies kill Laomiaozi and his family. Just before the highly-anticipated duel, Xie Xiaofeng realises that Yan Shisan is actually the mysterious person who saved him.

== Cast ==
- Derek Yee as Xie Xiaofeng
- Ling Yun as Yan Shisan
- Candice Yu as Xiaoli
- Chen Ping as Murong Qiudi
- Ku Feng as Laomiaozi
- Ouyang Sha-fei as Laomiaozi's mother
- Fan Mei-sheng as Mute
- Teresa Ha as Mute's wife
- Ching Miao as Xie Wangsun
- Yeung Chi-hing as Boss Yang
- Ku Kuan-chung and Ngai Fei as the Yumian brothers
- Norman Chui as Crow
- Ti Lung as Fu Hongxue
- David Chiang as Murong Jinlong
- Elliot Ngok as Zhou Yufeng
- Lo Lieh as Han Tang

== Reception ==
Paul of hkcinema.com gave the film four out of five stars, writing, "Death Duel is one of the latter wuxia films featuring the enchanting direction of Chor Yuen."

Andrew Saroch of fareastfilms.com gave the film four out of five stars, writing, "Death Duel is a bleak, nihilistic swordplay film that embodies all of the qualities that one expects from a Chor Yuen adaptation of a Gu Long story."

== See also ==
- Sword Master, 2016 film directed by Derek Yee
