= Clans of Intrigue =

1977 Hong Kong film by Chor Yuen

- DVD cover art
- 楚留香
- Directed by: Chor Yuen
- Screenplay by: Ni Kuang
- Story by: Gu Long
- Produced by: Runme Shaw
- Starring: Ti Lung; Ling Yun; Elliot Ngok; Nora Miao; Lee Ching; Betty Pei
- Cinematography: Wong Chit
- Edited by: Chiang Hsing-lung
- Music by: Frankie Chan
- Production company: Shaw Brothers Studio
- Distributed by: Shaw Brothers Studio
- Release date: 5 March 1977
- Running time: 95 minutes
- Country: Hong Kong
- Language: Mandarin

Clans of Intrigue (楚留香) is a 1977 Hong Kong wuxia film adapted from the novel Xuehai Piaoxiang of the Chu Liuxiang Series by Gu Long. The film was directed by Chor Yuen, produced by the Shaw Brothers Studio, and starred Ti Lung as Chu Liuxiang. It was followed by Legend of the Bat (1978) and Perils of the Sentimental Swordsman (1982).

== Synopsis ==
Chu Liuxiang is having drinks with his friend, Wuhua. Gong Nanyan of the Holy Water Palace suddenly appears and accuses Chu of having stolen their Heaven's One Holy Water and committed a series of murders. She agrees to give Chu a month's time to clear his name, or else the mistress of the palace would kill him. Chu's curiosity and eagerness to prove his innocence spur him to investigate the case.

== Cast ==
- Ti Lung as Chu Liuxiang
- Elliot Ngok as Wuhua
- Lee Ching as Heizhenzhu
- Nora Miao as Gong Nanyan
- Betty Pei as Shuimu Yinji
- Ling Yun as Zhongyuan Yidianhong
- Tin Ching as Nangong Lin
- Nancy Yen as Qiu Lingsu
- Chan Si-gai as Su Rongrong
- Lau Wai-ling as Li Hongxiu
- Chong Lee as Song Tian'er
- Ku Feng as Leng Qiuhun
- Ku Wen-chung as Tianfeng
- Cheng Miu as Sun Xuepu
- Norman Chui as Song Gang
- Yuen Wah as an Iga ninja
