= Demon Fighter =

1983 Taiwanese film by Chang Peng-i

- DVD cover art
- 楚留香新傳之午夜蘭花
- Directed by: Chang Peng-i
- Screenplay by: Gu Long
- Based on: Wuye Lanhua by Gu Long
- Produced by: Huang Hua-wu; Hu Chih-chung
- Starring: Adam Cheng; Brigitte Lin
- Cinematography: Gozo Matsui; Chu Pei-Chi
- Music by: Huang Mou-shan
- Production company: Qunlong Films
- Release date: 1983
- Running time: 79 minutes
- Country: Taiwan
- Language: Mandarin

Demon Fighter (楚留香新傳之午夜蘭花) is a 1983 Taiwanese wuxia film adapted from the novel Wuye Lanhua of the Chu Liuxiang Series by Gu Long. Directed by Chang Peng-i, it starred Adam Cheng and Brigitte Lin. The film was also released under alternative titles such as Orchids of Midnight, Night Orchid, Thirteen Moon Sword, Lone Ninja Warrior, and Faster Blade Poisonous Darts.

== Synopsis ==
Chu Liuxiang has vanished from the jianghu and is rumoured to be dead. A mysterious "Mr. Orchid" believes Chu Liuxiang is still alive and sets up an elaborate plot to draw him out of hiding.

== Cast ==
- Adam Cheng as Chu Liuxiang
- Brigitte Lin as Su Su
- Lu I-chan as Langgesi
- Wang Tao as Prince Langlai
- Eddy Ko as Tie Laoda
- Alan Chui as Nangong
- Fung Hak-on
- Lu Yilong as Hu Tiehua
- Tsao Chien as Liu Mingqiu
- Chang Hai-lun as Li Hongxiu
- Cheng Hsueh-lin as Song Tian'er
