= The Iron Buddha =

1970 Hong Kong film by Yan Jun

- Film poster
- 鐵羅漢
- Directed by: Yan Jun
- Written by: Sung Hiu-wong
- Produced by: Run Run Shaw
- Starring: Ling Yun; Fang Ying; Chan Hung-lit; Wong Chung-shun; Yue Wai
- Cinematography: Wong Kim-hon
- Edited by: Chiang Hsing-lung
- Music by: Wang Fu-ling
- Production company: Shaw Brothers Studio
- Distributed by: Shaw Brothers Studio
- Release date: 12 November 1970
- Running time: 89 minutes
- Country: Hong Kong
- Language: Mandarin
- Box office: HK$469,645

The Iron Buddha (鐵羅漢) is a 1970 Hong Kong wuxia film directed by Yan Jun and produced by the Shaw Brothers Studio, starring Ling Yun, Fang Ying, Chan Hung-lit, Wong Chung-shun, and Yue Wai. The film featured action choreography by Sammo Hung, who also appeared in a minor role.

== Synopsis ==
Lu Han, the apprentice of a renowned swordsman Liu Peng, seeks to avenge his master, who had been murdered by Xiaotianzun. During his quest, he also helps the Kang sisters fend off their enemies and saves Peony, a damsel in distress.

== Cast ==
- Ling Yun as Lu Han
- Fang Ying as Peony
- Chan Hung-lit as Geng Xian
- Wong Chung-shun as Xiaotianzun
- Jeanette Yu as Kang Yusheng
- Yau Ching as Kang Yuxiao
- Fan Mei-sheng as Luo Jiugong
- Ku Wen-chung as Wang Qi
- Yan Jun as Bao Yilong
- Shum Lo as Wang Wu
- Tang Di as Fei Bin
- Wang Ching-ho as Liu Peng
