= The Legend of Broken Sword =

1979 Hong Kong-Taiwanese film by Ulysses Au-yeung

- DVD cover art
- 折劍傳奇
- Directed by: Ulysses Au-yeung
- Written by: Gu Long
- Produced by: Ching Lan-wing
- Starring: Tien Peng
- Cinematography: Chiu Yao-Hu
- Edited by: Kwai Liang
- Music by: Huang Mao-Shan
- Production company: Tung Hai Film Production
- Release date: 9 June 1979
- Running time: 84 minutes
- Countries: Hong Kong; Taiwan
- Language: Mandarin

The Legend of Broken Sword (折劍傳奇), also known as Dragon of the Lost Ark or Dressed to Fight, is a 1979 wuxia film directed by Ulysses Au-yeung and written by Gu Long. The lead character, Hu Tiehua, appears in Gu Long's Chu Liuxiang Series as well.

== Cast ==
- Tien Peng as Hu Tiehua
- Doris Lung as Hung
- Man Kong-lung as Golden Bell Tang
- Ling Yun
- Elsa Yeung as Mai-ting
