= The Legend of Chu Liuxiang (2012 TV series) =

2012 Chinese TV series

- Promotional poster
- 楚留香新传
- Genre: Wuxia
- Based on: Chu Liuxiang Series by Gu Long
- Screenplay by: Zhang Xiaogang
- Directed by: Aman Chang
- Presented by: Dong Yongxiang; Xiaohui
- Starring: Ken Chang; Louis Fan; Xia Qing; Jin Qiaoqiao; Li Xin; Shi Lan; Shu Yaoxuan; Dai Chunrong; Zhao Yue; Tong Fan
- Theme music composer: Bei Hesan; Lai Weifeng; Cui Yan; Feng Yanzhong; Hao Yigang
- Opening theme: "Legend of Xiangshuai" (香帅传奇) by Ken Chang and Cui Zige
- Ending theme: "Friend and Foe" (朋友对手) by Ken Chang and Louis Fan; "Beauty's Fragrance" (美人香) by Evonne Hsu
- Country of origin: China
- Original language: Mandarin
- No. of episodes: 40

Production
- Executive producers: Jin Hongyue; Ken Chang; Xiaohui
- Producers: Wang Chuangli; Xiaohui
- Production location: Water Margin Film City
- Cinematography: Fan Qinyue; Tao Zhengyang
- Editor: Su Tian'en
- Running time: ≈ 45 minutes per episode
- Production companies: Qingdao Haihuang Culture Media; Tianjin Municipality Culture Arts Media Publishing House

Original release
- Network: ChingTV
- Release: 14 June 2012 – 2012

Related
- The Legend of Chu Liuxiang (2007)

The Legend of Chu Liuxiang (楚留香新传) is a Chinese wuxia television series directed by Aman Chang and adapted from four novels in the Chu Liuxiang Series by Gu Long, starring Taiwanese actor-singer Ken Chang as Chu Liuxiang. Filming for the series started in October 2010 in the Water Margin Film City in Dongping County, Shandong. It was first broadcast on ChingTV in South Korea on 14 June 2012.

== Cast ==
- Ken Chang as Chu Liuxiang
- Huang Juan as Shi Xiuyun
- Louis Fan as Hu Tiehua
- Liu Dekai as Xue Yiren
- Zhao Liang as Xue Xiaoren
- Yang Lixin as Zuo Qinghou
- Fu Yiwei as Hua Jingong
- Zhang Haiyan as Xue Honghong
- Bo Qing as Liang Ma
- Xue Yan as Xiaotuzi
- Tang Ning as Xiaomazi
- Liu Yuxin as Zuo Mingzhu
- Xia Jun as Ye Shenglan
- Xiao Jian as Zhang San
- Xia Yiyao as Jin Lingzhi
- Qin Li as Gao Ya'nan
- Lu Shan as Hua Zhenzhen
- Michael Tong as Yuan Suiyun
- Shao Luya as Dong Sanniang
- Long Huaizhong as Ding Feng
- Yan Yichang as Ying Wanli
- Wang Jiusheng as Gou Zichang
- Gao Hai as Bai Lie
- Zhang Dong as Xiang Tianfei
- Shi Ke as Hua Guma
- Yao Anlian as Shitian Zhaiyan
- Ruping as Du Xiansheng
- Hai Bo as Jiao Lin
- Li Haozhen as Bai Yunsheng
- Zhang Yilin as Yingzi
- Gao Zhao as Heizhugan
- Xu Ning as Xue Chuanxin
- Zhang Xiaowan as Xinyue
- Mou Cong as Baoji
- Xia Qing as Zhang Jiejie
- Jin Qiaoqiao as Ai Qing
- Li Xin as Ai Hong
- Zhao Yue as Heiyi Laoyu
- Tong Fan as Jin Siye
- Shi Lan as Laobanniang
- Cheung Tat-ming as Bu Danfu
- Ning Meng as Bu Ajuan
- Shu Yaoxuan as Penggong
- Dai Chunrong as Tuopo
- Zhang Guangbei as Maguan Laoren
- Chen Wei as Mayi Laofu
- Sun Lisha as Jin Guniang
