= Chor Lau-heung (1995 TV series) =

1995 Taiwanese television series

- DVD cover art
- 香帥傳奇
- Genre: Wuxia
- Based on: Chu Liuxiang Series by Gu Long
- Directed by: Fan Siu-ming
- Starring: Adam Cheng
- Theme music composer: Tso Hung-yuen; Chang You-chi
- Opening theme: "Heaven and Earth Are Great" (天大地大) by Adam Cheng
- Ending theme: "New Shuidiao Getou" (新水調歌頭) by Ye Fan; "I'm Falling in Love" (情陷紅塵) by Lee E-jun
- Country of origin: Taiwan
- Original language: Mandarin
- No. of episodes: 44

Production
- Producer: Cao Jingde
- Running time: ≈ 45 minutes per episode

Original release
- Network: TTV
- Release: 3 April 1995

Chor Lau-heung (香帥傳奇) is a Taiwanese wuxia television series. The eponymous character, Chu Liuxiang (Chor Lau-heung), is from the Chu Liuxiang Series by Gu Long, but the story is an original one created by the screenwriters instead of an adaptation of the novels. Adam Cheng, who had previously portrayed Chu Liuxiang in earlier television series, reprised his role in this series, which was first broadcast on TTV in Taiwan on 3 April 1995.

== Cast ==
- Adam Cheng as Chu Liuxiang
- Cynthia Khan as Shangguan Wuji
- Shen Meng-sheng as Hu Tiehua
- Kang Kai as Ji Bingyan
- Hsia Kuang-li as Princess Shengnian
- Chen Ya-lan as Gao Ya'nan
- Yang Chiung-hua as Qiuxin
- Huang Chian-chun as Prince Zhaoming
- Lin Mei-chen as Su Rongrong
- Chang Hsin-yueh as Li Hongxiu
- Huang Hsiao-ching as Song Tian'er
- Huang Hsiao-lung as Ah-bu
- Li Chuan-chung as Bai Dilun
- Hao Man-li as Bao Yudai
- Li Ching-fang as King of Dalibisi
- Meng Ting-li as Lian Nichang
- Cheng Ping-chun as Tianfeng Shisilang
- Kang Tian-hung as Sun Moon Cult leader
