= Legend of the Liquid Sword (film) =

1993 Hong Kong film by Wong Jing

- DVD cover art
- 笑俠楚留香
- Directed by: Wong Jing; Yeung Wai-yip
- Screenplay by: Wong Jing; Lam Wai-lun
- Based on: Chu Liuxiang Series by Gu Long
- Produced by: Wong Jing
- Starring: Aaron Kwok; Chingmy Yau; Sharla Cheung; Gloria Yip; Deric Wan; Wong Wan-si; Anita Yuen; Winnie Lau; Lau Tsi-wai; Fennie Yuen; Loletta Lee; Norman Chui; Gordon Liu
- Cinematography: Ko Chiu-lam; Yim Wai-kwan
- Edited by: Robert Choi
- Music by: James Wong; Mark Lui
- Production companies: Era International; Wong Jing's Workshop
- Distributed by: Newport Entertainment
- Release date: 11 March 1993
- Running time: 86 minutes
- Country: Hong Kong
- Language: Cantonese
- Box office: HK$3,453,404

Legend of the Liquid Sword (笑俠楚留香) is a 1993 Hong Kong wuxia comedy film loosely adapted from the Chu Liuxiang Series by Gu Long. The film was written and directed by Wong Jing and starred Aaron Kwok as Chu Liuxiang. The film inspired the title of American rapper GZA's albums Liquid Swords (1995) and Legend of the Liquid Sword (2002).

== Synopsis ==
Chu Liuxiang is sent by his master, Dugu Qiubai, to attend a martial arts contest in Shaolin Monastery that is held once every ten years. On the journey, he meets Hu Tiehua and Zhongyuan Yidianhong. When Chu arrives at Shaolin, he fights with a Shaolin member called Wuhua but neither of them is able to defeat each other. They decide to have a match again on another day. One night, Chu meets Wuhua and strikes up a conversation with her. Both of them decide to enter the palace in search of adventure. They disturb the prince on his wedding night but are accidentally caught in a trap and only manage to escape with the help of their friends.

Meanwhile, Bat Prince breaks into Shaolin and kills Dugu Qiubai, the Demonic Cult's leader, and Wuhua's master. Bat Prince is actually the son of a Japanese ninja called Tianfeng Shisilang, and he wants to avenge his father. 17 years ago, his father came to challenge the three best fighters in China, but was defeated and committed suicide in shame. Bat Prince is not satisfied even after his victory and wants to dominate the jianghu. Chu is injured by Bat Prince in a fight and loses his powers. Wuhua takes him to the Holy Water Palace for treatment. Shuimu Yinji heals Chu's wounds and teaches him new skills, after which Chu faces the Bat Prince in a fight.

== Cast ==
- Aaron Kwok as Chu Liuxiang
- Chingmy Yau as Wuhua
- Sharla Cheung as Shuimu Yinji
- Anita Yuen as Li Hongxiu
- Deric Wan as Hu Tiehua
- Fennie Yuen as Zhongyuan Yidianhong
- Norman Chui as Dugu Qiubai
- Gordon Liu as Shaolin master
- Wong Yue as Tianfeng Shisilang
- Lau Tsi-wai as Bat Prince
- Gloria Yip as Su Rongrong
- Winnie Lau as Song Tian'er
- Loretta Lee as Gong Nanyan
- Wong Wan-si as Shuipi Yinji
- Julian Cheung as the Prince
- Maple Hui as the Prince's bride
- Mai Kei as the Emperor
- David Tsui as a robber
- Lee Siu-kei as a bully
- Chun Wong as Eunuch Chu

== Distribution ==
Mei Ah Entertainment released a dual-subtitle DVD that they have since taken out of print. Xenon Pictures handled the United States release which basically contains the Mei Ah version with the only difference that the entire opening sequence was replaced with a card reading simply "Liquid Sword." The original burned-in subtitles are used.

The full uncut print runs 12 minutes longer than the Mei Ah (Hong Kong) and Xenon (United States) releases and was released in Taiwan on video by ERA Home Video.
