= The Last Duel (1981 film) =

1981 Taiwanese film by Ling Yun

- DVD cover art
- 英雄對英雄
- Directed by: Ling Yun
- Screenplay by: Ling Yun
- Based on: Youling Shanzhuang by Gu Long
- Produced by: Alan Wu
- Starring: Ling Yun; Wei Tze-wan; Nora Miao; Chen Wai-lau; Tien Yeh; Tsui Fong
- Cinematography: James Wu Kuo-Ren
- Edited by: Chiang Huang-Hsiung
- Music by: Fu Li
- Distributed by: Ocean Shores Video
- Release dates: 28 March 1981 (Taiwan); 25 June 1981 (Hong Kong)
- Running time: 90 minutes
- Country: Taiwan
- Language: Mandarin

The Last Duel (英雄對英雄), also known as Dark Skinned Assassin and Hero vs. Hero, is a 1981 Taiwanese wuxia film adapted from the novel Youling Shanzhuang of the Lu Xiaofeng Series by Gu Long.

== Cast ==
- Ling Yun as Ximen Chuixue
- Wei Tze-wan as Lu Xiaofeng
- Nora Miao as Hua Guafu
- Chan Wai-lau as Dugu Mei
- Tien Yeh as Laodao Bazi
- Tsui Fung as Ye Xue
