= The Legend of Chu Liuxiang (2007 TV series) =

2007 Chinese television series

- DVD box art
- Also known as: The Legendary Knight
- 楚留香传奇
- Genre: Wuxia
- Based on: Chu Liuxiang Series by Gu Long
- Screenplay by: Yu Zheng; Liu Qi; Sha Lang
- Directed by: Liu Fengsheng; Kuk Kwok-leung
- Presented by: You Jiaming
- Starring: Ken Chu; Hu Jing; Sun Feifei; Liu Jia; Cui Peng; Benny Chan; Choo Ja-hyun; Stephanie Hsiao; Kingone Wang; Sammul Chan; Mu Tingting
- Opening theme: "Song of the Fragrant Sword" (香剑吟) by Li Fei and Tian Yi
- Ending theme: "Wild and Carefree" (任逍遥) by Wu Pinchun; "A Hero Gets Angry for a Beauty" (英雄一怒为红颜) by Xiaozhuang and She Manni
- Country of origin: China
- Original language: Mandarin
- No. of episodes: 43

Production
- Producer: You Jianming
- Production location: China
- Cinematography: Shao Jinghui; Jiang Jicheng
- Running time: ≈ 45 minutes per episode
- Production companies: China Central Television; Guangdong CHS Media; Southern Television Guangdong; Joy Media

Original release
- Network: CCTV-8
- Release: 7 December 2007

Related
- The Legend of Chu Liuxiang (2012)

The Legend of Chu Liuxiang (楚留香传奇) is a Chinese wuxia television series adapted from three novels of the Chu Liuxiang Series by Gu Long. The series was first broadcast on CCTV-8 in December 2007 in China.

== Synopsis ==
=== Part 1: Fragrance in the Sea of Blood ===
Chu Liuxiang is a highly-skilled martial artist who steals from the rich to help the poor. He becomes the prime suspect in the theft of the "Heaven's One Holy Water", a deadly potion used by the all-female martial arts school Holy Water Palace, and a series of murders. Given three months to solve the mystery and clear his name, he seeks help from his friends Song Tian'er, Su Rongrong, Zhongyuan Yidianhong, and others. The perpetrator turns out to be his friend, Wuhua, whom he defeats in a fight. Wuhua then commits suicide by consuming poison.

=== Part 2: The Vast Desert ===
Chu Liuxiang's adventures lead him to the desert, where he encounters his friend, Hu Tiehua. At the same time, he meets Linlang, whom he saves from a kidnapper, and falls in love with her. However, he discovers later that Linlang is actually Shiguanyin, a mysterious and highly-feared female martial artist. Shiguanyin and Wuhua (who has actually survived) are behind a plot to take over a desert kingdom ruled by an incompetent king. With the aid of his friends, Chu Liuxiang foils the plot and helps the king regain power. Chu Liuxiang defeats Shiguanyin in a fight and apparently kills her.

=== Part 3: The Thrush ===
Chu Liuxiang gets into conflict with the Holy Water Palace once more when the martial arts school's members kidnap Song Tian'er and Hu Tiehua. Their leader, Shuimu Yinji, mistakes Song Tian'er for her long-lost daughter and showers her with love and care. Chu Liuxiang arrives at the palace with Li Hongxiu and Zhongyuan Yidianhong to rescue his friends, and engages Shuimu Yinji and her followers in a fight. He uncovers a plot by Liu Hongmei and Wuhua to seize control of the school. Shuimu Yinji dies as she has been poisoned by the conspirators. Song Tian'er eventually succeeds Shuimu Yinji as the school's leader.

== Cast ==
- Ken Chu as Chu Liuxiang
- Hu Jing as Su Rongrong
- Sun Feifei as Li Hongxiu
- Liu Jia as Song Tian'er
- Cui Peng as Wuhua
  - Sun Xinyu as Wuhua (young)
- Benny Chan as Hu Tiehua
- Choo Ja-hyun as Shiguanyin
  - Zhang Yijing as Shiguanyin (young)
- Stephanie Hsiao as Shuimu Yinji / Yu Chisu
- Kingone Wang as Zhongyuan Yidianhong
- Sammul Chan as the King of Moon City
- Mu Tingting as Liu Wumei
- Wang Jing as Gong Nanyan
- Deng Jiajia as Zhangsun Hong
- Xiu Qing as Tianfeng Shisilang
- Wang Bowen as Xue Yiren
- Wang Gang as Xue Xiaoren
- Nan Ji as Qiu Lingsu
- Tian Zhenwei as Li Yuhan
- Wang Jing as Jiao Yu
- Jin Song as Desert Fox
- Liu Yong as Xiaopan
- Wan Ni'en as Situ Jing
- Tong Tong as Cuihua
- Wu Yuejin as Lianggu
- Wang Huiqiao as Fenggu
- Shi Ting as Cai Qiao
- Yang Haiquan as Ren Ci
- Ye Erjiang as Wei Huo
- Zheng Yue as Yueya'er
- Lin Jiajun as Shuyan
- Li Qingxiang as Zhamuhe
- Guo Qiming as Ximen Qian
- Yu Jianguo as Zuo Youzheng
- Li Yuan as Bai Yumo
- Zhou Dehua as Tuying
- Zong Fengyan as Sun Xuepu
- Yuan Ming as Jin Banhua
- Xu Ming as the Shaolin abbot
- Tan Jianchang as Wuyazi
- Han Zhi as Song Gang
- Tian Zhong as Shi Tuo
- Lou Yajiang as Ping Fan
- Wang Jingluan as Wumei
- Liu Jianwei as Leng Qiuhun

== Reception ==
CCTV reviewer Xiangshuai commented on the series's "luxurious cast" and "amazing script". She said the script captured the vibes written by Gu Long four decades ago about internal human disputes. She praised the actors and actresses for their performance, which "enhanced" the script to give viewers a sense of what the characters were feeling.

The Legend of Chu Liuxiang received honours on CCTV-8 for being the third-top rated series of 2007, as well as receiving the third-highest viewership of all television series broadcast in 2007 on CCTV-8, even though it was released in December.

== International broadcast ==
Country	Network	Airing dates
China	CCTV-8	December 5, 2007 - (00:00)
Taiwan	CTV	December 12, 2011 – February 21, 2012 (Monday to Friday from 16:00 to 17:00)
Thailand	MCOT Family Number 14 (เอ็มคอตแฟมิลี่ หมายเลข 14)	July 3, 2018 - January 29, 2018 (Every Tuesday from 20:15 - 21:00)
Thailand	MCOT Family Number 14 (เอ็มคอตแฟมิลี่ หมายเลข 14)	February 4, 2018 -, 2018 (Every Monday to Wednesday at 14.00 - 15.00 hrs. And from 21.00 to 22.00 hrs.)
