= Chu Liuxiang =

Fictional protagonist of a wuxia novel series by Gu Long

- Chu Liuxiang Series character
- Created by: Gu Long

In-universe information
- Nicknames: "Xiangshuai"; "Daoshuai"
- Gender: Male
- Spouse: Zhang Jiejie

Chu Liuxiang

Chinese name
- Traditional Chinese: 楚留香
- Simplified Chinese: 楚留香
Transcriptions
Standard Mandarin
- Hanyu Pinyin: Chǔ Liúxiāng
Yue: Cantonese
- Jyutping: Co^{2} Lau^{4}-hoeng^{1}

Xiangshuai
- Traditional Chinese: 香帥
- Simplified Chinese: 香帅
- Literal meaning: Chief Xiang
Transcriptions
Standard Mandarin
- Hanyu Pinyin: Xiāng Shuài
Yue: Cantonese
- Jyutping: Hoeng^{1} Seoi^{3}

Daoshuai
- Traditional Chinese: 盜帥
- Simplified Chinese: 盗帅
- Literal meaning: Chief of Bandits/Thieves
Transcriptions
Standard Mandarin
- Hanyu Pinyin: Dào Shuài
Yue: Cantonese
- Jyutping: Dou^{6} Seoi^{3}

Vietnamese name
- Vietnamese: Sở Lưu Hương

Chu Liuxiang (楚留香) is the fictional protagonist of the wuxia novel series Chu Liuxiang Series by Gu Long. His given name "Liuxiang" literally means "lingering fragrance". Nicknamed "Daoshuai" (盜帥; "Bandit Chief") or "Xiangshuai" (香帥; "Chief Xiang"), he steals from the rich to help the poor and upholds justice in the jianghu (martial artists' community). He has been portrayed in numerous films and television series adapted from the novel series by notable actors such as Ti Lung, Adam Cheng, Michael Miu, Richie Ren, Ken Chu, and Ken Chang.

== Character description ==
Chu Liuxiang is a martial artist whose prowess in qinggong is among the best in the jianghu. He carries a metal hand fan and uses it only for self-defence. Despite his combat skills and impressive qinggong, he has never killed anyone. Usually, he relies on his wit, experience and calm to solve mysteries and overcome enemies who are far more powerful than him. The identity of his martial arts master is unknown, and even the well-informed Shuimu Yinji (水母陰姬) could only deduce that he is an apprentice of Ye Di (夜帝), a character from Daqi Yingxiong Zhuan, another of Gu Long's novels.

Although his age is not mentioned in any of the novels, Chu Liuxiang is in his 30s when the events of the novels take place. In Bianfu Chuanqi, his childhood friend, Hu Tiehua (胡鐵花), is 33, so Chu Liuxiang is presumably around the same age as him since they grew up together.

Chu Liuxiang lives on a houseboat, called "Xiang's Pavilion" (香榭), with three women who are the closest to him apart from his two best friends, Hu Tiehua and Ji Bingyan (姬冰雁). They come from pitiful backgrounds and have been following Chu Liuxiang since they were 11 or 12. The first, Su Rongrong (蘇蓉蓉), is kind and understanding and specialises in the art of disguise. The second, Li Hongxiu (李紅袖), is very clear and alert and has a good memory. The third, Song Tian'er (宋甜兒), is a good chef and is the most mischievous of the three. Chu Liuxiang also meets several other women on his adventures, such as Heizhenzhu (黑珍珠), Shi Xiuyun (石繡雲), Hua Zhenzhen (華真真), Dong Sanniang (東三娘), and Xinyue (新月). He eventually marries Zhang Jiejie (張潔潔), whom he meets in Taohua Chuanqi.

A legendary figure in the jianghu, Chu Liuxiang has a wide network of friends, acquaintances and contacts, including: Hu Tiehua, his childhood friend who has a penchant for alcoholic drinks; Ji Bingyan, who appears cold and indifferent but is actually very warm-hearted; Wuhua (無花), a Buddhist monk who later turns out to be a villain; Zhongyuan Yidianhong (中原一點紅), a powerful swordsman and contract killer; Zuo Qinghou (左輕侯), the hospitable master of Cup-Throwing Manor; Zhang San (張三), a marine expert.

== Novels ==
Chu Liuxiang Series
- Xuehai Piaoxiang; Da Shamo; Huameiniao; Bianfu Chuanqi; Guilian Xiaqing; Taohua Chuanqi; Xinyue Chuanqi; Wuye Lanhua
- Author: Gu Long
- Original title: 楚留香系列
- Country: Taiwan; Hong Kong; China
- Language: Chinese
- Genre: Wuxia
- Publisher: True and Beautiful Publishing House, Wuxia Chunqiu, Knightly World, China Times, Anhui Literature and Art Publishing House
- Published: 1969–1993
- Media type: Print

=== Xuehai Piaoxiang ===
Xuehai Piaoxiang (血海飄香), literally Fragrance in the Sea of Blood, is the first novel in the series, forming a story arc with Da Shamo and Huameiniao. This novel first introduces Chu Liuxiang, who has stolen a rare flower and taken it back to his houseboat. When he notices the dead bodies of several martial artists drifting towards him, he decides to investigate. Meanwhile, the Heaven's One Holy Water, a deadly potion, is stolen from the all-female martial arts sect Holy Water Palace (神水宮). Chu Liuxiang immediately becomes the prime suspect because, given his prowess in qinggong and martial arts, he is probably the only person capable of stealing it and getting away undetected. Faced with seemingly insurmountable odds and a pressing deadline, Chu Liuxiang solves the mystery and clears his name. Wuhua, Chu Liuxiang's friend, turns out to be the mastermind behind everything. After being defeated by Chu Liuxiang in a fight, Wuhua commits suicide by consuming poison.

=== Da Shamo ===
Da Shamo (大沙漠), literally The Vast Desert, was first published in 1967, and forms the middle part of a story arc with Xuehai Piaoxiang and Huameiniao. In this novel, Chu Liuxiang returns to his houseboat after defeating Wuhua and discovers that his close companions Su Rongrong, Li Hongxiu and Song Tian'er have gone missing. While searching for them, he ends up in the desert, where he meets his friends Hu Tiehua and Ji Bingyan. Through a series of strange encounters, Chu Liuxiang learns that the mysterious Shiguanyin (石觀音) is the mastermind behind a sinister plot. One of her accomplices is Wuhua, who has survived after attempting suicide. Chu Liuxiang foils Shiguanyin's plot and defeats her, resulting in her taking her own life. Even after everything is over, Chu Liuxiang has not found his three missing companions yet.

=== Huameiniao ===
Huameiniao (畫眉鳥), literally The Thrush, is the third novel in the series and forms the last part of a story arc with Xuehai Piaoxiang and Da Shamo. In this novel, Chu Liuxiang encounters Li Yuhan (李玉函) and his wife, Liu Wumei (柳無眉), who was also Shiguanyin's apprentice. He gets into a one-on-one fight with Shuimu Yinji (水母陰姬), the mistress of the Holy Water Palace. After defeating her, he exposes another plot by Li Yuhan and Liu Wumei, and rescues his three missing companions.

=== Bianfu Chuanqi ===
Bianfu Chuanqi (蝙蝠傳奇), literally The Legend of the Bat, follows Chu Liuxiang's adventures on the mysterious Bat Island, a secret trading post for black market items in the jianghu. From time to time, the island's master, "Bat Gongzi" (蝙蝠公子), will send exclusive invitations to guests to carry out trading in a dark cave on the island to maintain secrecy.

Through a series of serendipitous encounters, Chu Liuxiang, along with his friends Hu Tiehua and Zhang San, make their way to Bat Island. He also meets Yuan Suiyun (原隨雲), a blind but formidable martial artist from a reputable family. On the island, he uncovers a sinister plot by the island's elusive master, who turns out to be Yuan Suiyun. At a critical moment, Jin Lingzhi (金靈芝), who has secretly fallen in love with Hu Tiehua, saves everyone by setting up a plan to stop Yuan Suiyun.

=== Guilian Xiaqing ===
Guilian Xiaqing (鬼戀俠情), literally Phantom Love and Heroic Romance, is alternatively known as Guilian Chuanqi (鬼戀傳奇; "The Legend of the Phantom Love") and Jieshi Huanhun (借屍還魂; "Borrowing a Corpse to Return a Soul to Life"). In this novel, Chu Liuxiang is recruited by a friend, Zuo Qinghou, to solve a mystery. Zuo Qinghou's daughter, Zuo Mingzhu, had seemingly died from a strange illness shortly before another woman, Shi Yin (施茵). At the moment of Shi Yin's death, Zuo Mingzhu had suddenly returned to life, claiming to be possessed by Shi Yin's spirit.

Chu Liuxiang investigates the mystery and learns that it is tied to two pairs of star-crossed lovers. On one hand, Zuo Mingzhu is in love with Xue Bin (薛斌), but they cannot be together due to a longstanding feud between their families. On the other hand, Shi Yin is in love with Ye Shenglan (葉勝蘭), but her parents have arranged for her to marry Xue Bin. Zuo Mingzhu and Shi Yin have therefore come up with an elaborate plan to trick their families into believing that Shi Yin is dead and that Zuo Mingzhu is possessed by Shi Yin's spirit, so that Shi Yin can elope with Ye Shenglan while Zuo Mingzhu can marry Xue Bin. Chu Liuxiang secretly helps the lovers get together and gives them his blessings.

=== Taohua Chuanqi ===
Taohua Chuanqi (桃花傳奇), literally The Legend of the Peach Blossom, follows Chu Liuxiang's entanglements with a martial arts clan of unknown origin. In every generation, a girl will be chosen from the clan to serve as their Sacred Maiden and she must then take a vow of celibacy. The next Sacred Maiden's mother, not wanting her daughter to spend the rest of her life in solitude, thinks that Chu Liuxiang might be an ideal husband for her daughter. She sets up an elaborate plan to lure Chu Liuxiang into undergoing a series of challenges to assess his suitability. The novel ends on a cliffhanger resembling the paradox in the English short story The Lady, or the Tiger?.

=== Xinyue Chuanqi ===
Xinyue Chuanqi (新月傳奇), literally The Legend of the New Moon, follows Chu Liuxiang's adventures as he deals with a pirate lord, Shi Tianwang (史天王), who poses a threat on the sea and in the jianghu due to his formidable fighting prowess and highly unpredictable and elusive nature. "Mr. Du" (Chinese: 杜先生), the mysterious female leader of a martial arts clan seeking to eliminate the pirates, has pretended to offer the hand-in-marriage of her daughter, Xinyue (新月), to Shi Tianwang, so that Xinyue can find an opportunity to assassinate the pirate lord.

Chu Liuxiang gets involved when, by chance, he meets Xinyue's father, Jiao Lin (焦林), who seeks his help in finding his long-lost daughter. He also learns that "Mr. Du" has recruited his friend, Hu Tiehua, to escort Xinyue to meet Shi Tianwang. As news of Xinyue and Shi Tianwang's upcoming wedding spread, more figures from the jianghu get involved. Chu Liuxiang also encounters Ishida Hitoshihiko-Saemon (石田齋彥左衛門), a ninja master seeking vengeance on Shi Tianwang for stealing his concubine, Baoji (豹姬). Baoji, fearing that she will lose Shi Tianwang's favour after he marries Xinyue, has sent assassins to kill Xinyue.

Chu Liuxiang starts a romantic relationship with Xinyue, who also pledges her love to him even though she ultimately marries Shi Tianwang. On the wedding night, Xinyue successfully completes her mission by distinguishing the real Shi Tianwang from his six decoys and kills him, restoring peace in the jianghu.

=== Wuye Lanhua ===
Wuye Lanhua (午夜蘭花), literally The Midnight Orchid, opens with rumours in the jianghu that Chu Liuxiang is dead. A mysterious "Mr. Orchid" (蘭花先生) believes that Chu Liuxiang is still alive so he/she sets up an elaborate plot to lure him out of hiding.

== Adaptations ==
=== Films ===
Year	Title	Main cast	Notes
1977	Clans of Intrigue	Ti Lung, Ling Yun, Elliot Ngok, Nora Miao, Li Ching, Betty Pei	
1978	Legend of the Bat	Ti Lung, Ling Yun, Elliot Ngok, Derek Yee, Ching Li, Wong Chung, Candice Yu	
1979	The Legend of Broken Sword	Tien Peng, Ling Yun, Doris Chen, Wen Chiang-lung	
1980	Chu Liuxiang Chuanqi	Liu Dekai, Sun Chia-lin, Chou Ming-hui	
1980	Chu Liu Hsiang and Hu Tieh Hua	Liu Dekai, James Tien	
1980	The Sun Moon Legend	Meng Fei, Ling Yun, Wang Kuan-hsiung, Shih Feng	
1980	Middle Kingdom's Mark of Blood	Ling Yun, Tin Hok, Doris Lung, Betty Pei, Cheng Hsi-keng, Wang Hsieh	
1982	Perils of the Sentimental Swordsman	Ti Lung, Ling Yun, Elliot Ngok, Nora Miao, Li Ching, Betty Pei	
1982	Tanzhi Shengong	Angie Chiu, Chung Yan, Ng Man-tat, Ha Yu, Ko Miu-see, Liao An-li, Meng Fei, David Chiang	
1983	Demon Fighter	Adam Cheng, Brigitte Lin	
1983	The Denouncement of Chu Liu Hsiang	Adam Cheng, Lui Ying-ying, Norman Chu, Luk Yat-lung, Tin Hok, Luk Yee-fung, Chow Ming-hui, Chow Shui-fong	
1993	Legend of the Liquid Sword	Aaron Kwok, Anita Yuen, Deric Wan, Sharla Cheung, Fennie Yuen, Chingmy Yau, Norman Chui, Lau Tsi-wai, Gloria Yip, Winnie Lau, Loletta Lee	

=== Television ===
Year	Title	Main cast	Notes
1979	Chor Lau-heung	Adam Cheng, Liza Wang, Angie Chiu	
1979	It Takes a Thief	Pat Poon, Kenneth Tsang, Paul Chun, Alex Man, Bonnie Ngai, Law Lok-lam, Mary Cheung, Man Man-yee, Wen Hsueh-erh, Yuen Pui-jan, Miu Kam-fung, Chan Yuen-mei, Yung Wai-man, Nancy Sit, Choi King-fai	
1984	The New Adventures of Chor Lau-heung	Michael Miu, Barbara Yung, Mini Kung, Sharon Yeung, Austin Wai, Simon Yam, Lau Dan, Cecilia Fong, Cheung Ying-choi, Kwok Fung, Lee Heung-kam, Benz Hui, Ng Man-tat, Kwan Hoi-san	
1985	Chor Lau-heung	Adam Cheng, Michelle Yim, Eddy Ko, Li Hai-hsing, Chen Mei-chun, Chiang Jung-li, Huang Hui-wen, Ching Li, Chiang Hou-jen, Mei Chang-fen, Lu Hsiao-huang	
1995	Chor Lau-heung	Adam Cheng, Cynthia Khan, Shen Meng-sheng, Hsia Kuang-li, Chen Ya-lan, Kang Kai, Ling Mei-chen, Chang Hsin-yueh, Huang Hsiao-ching	
2000	Ximen Wuhen 西門無恨	Vincent Chiao, Yang Junjun, Liu Dekai, Bryan Leung, Yen Shi-kwan	a Taiwanese TV series loosely adapted from the Chu Liuxiang Series
2001	The New Adventures of Chor Lau-heung	Richie Ren, Ruby Lin, Dicky Cheung, Eric Suen, Ekin Cheng, Gigi Lai, Kristy Yang, Joey Meng, Anita Yuen	
2007	The Legend of Chu Liuxiang	Ken Chu, Hu Jing, Sun Feifei, Liu Jia, Cui Peng, Benny Chan, Choo Ja-hyun, Stephanie Hsiao, Kingone Wang, Sammul Chan, Mu Tingting	
2012	The Legend of Chu Liuxiang	Ken Chang, Louis Fan, Xia Qing, Jin Qiaoqiao, Li Xin, Shi Lan, Shu Yaoxuan, Dai Chunrong, Zhao Yue, Tong Fan	

=== Video games ===
- Master Chu and the Drunkard Hu
- Chu Liuxiang Xinzhuan (楚留香新傳) is a RPG released in 2001 by Taiwan's UserJoy Technology. The game's story line is based on four novels in the series: Guilian Xiaqing, Taohua Chuanqi, Xinyue Chuanqi and Wuye Lanhua.
