= The Denouement of Chu Liu Hsiang =

1983 Taiwanese film by Chang Peng-i

- DVD cover art
- 楚留香大結局
- Directed by: Chang Peng-i
- Written by: Gu Long; Lu Chi-shang
- Produced by: Wang Huawu; Wang Peilei
- Starring: Adam Cheng
- Cinematography: Lai Man-hung
- Edited by: Wong Chau-gwai
- Music by: Huang Mou-shan
- Production company: Yong Yu Films
- Release date: 5 May 1983 (Taiwan)
- Country: Taiwan
- Language: Mandarin
- Box office: HK$1,408,903

The Denouement of Chu Liu Hsiang (楚留香大結局), alternatively known as Legendary Swordsman and Titanium Blade, is a 1983 Taiwanese wuxia film directed by Chang Peng-i and starring Adam Cheng. The main character, Chu Liuxiang, is from the Chu Liuxiang Series by Gu Long, who also co-wrote the screenplay for the film.

== Cast ==
- Adam Cheng as Chu Liuxiang
- Lui Ying-ying as Lin Huanyu
- Norman Chui as Murong Qingcheng
- Luk Yat-lung as Hu Tiehua
- Tin Hok as Liu Shangdi
- Luk Yee-fung as Liu Rushi
- Chow Ming-hui as Song Tian'er
- Chow Shui-fong as Li Hongxiu
- Alan Chui as Daoba Hou
