= Chor Lau-heung (1985 TV series) =

1985 Taiwanese television series

- DVD cover art
- 楚留香新傳
- Genre: Wuxia
- Based on: Chu Liuxiang Series by Gu Long
- Screenplay by: Yao Ching-kang; Wang Chung-jen
- Directed by: Chang Peng-i; Li Yue-feng; Hsu Sheng-yu
- Starring: Adam Cheng
- Opening theme: "Cloud Ripples" (雲漪) by Fei Yu-ching
- Country of origin: Taiwan
- Original language: Mandarin
- No. of episodes: 20

Production
- Producers: Chou Ling-kang; Men Tzu-chian; Chen Kuo-chi
- Running time: ≈ 120 minutes per episode

Original release
- Network: CTV
- Release: 11 February 1985 – 2 March 1986

Related
- Chor Lau-heung (1979)

Chor Lau-heung (楚留香新傳) is a Taiwanese wuxia television series adapted from the Chu Liuxiang Series by Gu Long. The series is an unofficial sequel to the 1979 Hong Kong television series of the same title by TVB, with lead actor Adam Cheng reprising his role as the eponymous character, Chu Liuxiang (Chor Lau-heung). The series was divided into four parts, each lasting 4 to 6 episodes and with a different director. It was first broadcast on CTV in Taiwan in 1985.

== Synopsis ==
=== Part 1: Legend of the New Moon ===
News of Xinyue's marriage to Shi Tianwang cause much excitement in the jianghu. However, the princess goes missing suddenly and Chu Liuxiang is accused of having kidnapped her, and he becomes the primary target of many martial artists. Chu Liuxiang is unable to explain himself and can only promise to find the princess within ten days. He encounters a wide range of perils during his quest to find the missing princess.

=== Part 2: Legend of the Orchid ===
A strange orchid is said to hold a big secret of the jianghu. Several martial artists are eager to get the flower and start fighting among themselves. A mysterious killer goes around murdering innocent people, leaving behind an orchid beside each victim's body. Chu Liuxiang decides to investigate the case and unravel the mystery.

=== Part 3: Legend of the Parrot ===
The White Jade Parrot, a treasure of the Loulan Kingdom, has been stolen. Tie Hen, the best constable in Loulan, is sent to investigate the theft. Chu Liuxiang is among the suspects.

=== Part 4: Legend of the Shadow ===
On the night of the full moon, members of the five major martial arts schools die mysteriously from unnatural causes. The schools get Chu Liuxiang to help them find out the truth within three months. Chu Liuxiang trails the shadow of a mysterious person and finds something suspicious about his girlfriend, Shen Wuxin. His investigation further leads him to an unsolved mystery 20 years ago. At the same time, Shen Wuxin's brother is planning to dominate the jianghu.

== Cast ==
- Adam Cheng as Chu Liuxiang
- Michelle Yim as Su Rongrong / Su Mangmang
- Eddy Ko / Lucifer Lee as Hu Tiehua
- Huang Hui-wen as Princess Xinyue
- Shen Hai-jung as Mr. Du
- Hsiang Peng-yun as Jiao Lin
- Koon Jing-wah as Yingzi
- Chen Mei-chun / Mei Chang-fen as Li Hongxiu
- Chiang Li-li / Lu Hsiao-huang as Song Tian'er
- Fang Mian as Eunuch Qin
- Chiang Hou-jen as Murong Qingyun
- Wu Feng as Zuo Qinghou
- Lin Ling as Zuo Piaopiao
- Lin Hsiu-chun as Madam Yu
- Kuo Yen-yen as Shuiyin
- Chen Li-hua as Taiyang
- Kung Lien-hua as Wuse
- Cheng Peng as Shangguan Dao
- Yu Shih-keng as Xiaoshuidi
- Li Chiang as Daonu
- Yi Chiang as Shui Linglong
- Lin Kuang-jung as Granny Ding
- Su Kuo-liang as Liu Mingqiu
- Yang Chi-tung as Wujie
- Chen Yu-mei as Xuenu
- Hsiang Yun-peng as Tie Hen
- Tie Meng-chiu as Loulan King
- Liu Hsiao-ping as Loulan Queen
- Lin Hsiu-chun as Tang Yu
- Tu Tai-feng as Song Bieli
- Chiu Shu-yi as Shen Wuxin
- Teng Mei-fang as Lian Furong
- Hua Lun as Yuan Wenxiu
- Cheng Peng as Yue Wushuang
- Liu Lin as Wu Buzhi
- Li Chiang as Zhong Kui
- Kuan Hung as Laosaoba
- Tu Tai-feng as Yu Keren
- Lin Kuang-jung as Li San
- Pai Lung as Bai Wuchang
- Chen Min-hua as Hei Wuchang
