= Chor Lau-heung (1979 TV series) =

1979 Hong Kong television series

- Cover art of one of the three Hong Kong VCD box sets, displaying Adam Cheng, Angie Chiu (left) and Liza Wang (bottom)
- 楚留香
- Genre: Wuxia
- Based on: Chu Liuxiang Series by Gu Long
- Screenplay by: Wong Jing; Wu Sa; Ng Ho
- Directed by: Wong Tin-lam; Lee Siu-tuen; Lee Yiu-man; Wong Kin-fan; Yau Ka-hung; Lam Kuen
- Starring: Adam Cheng; Angie Chiu; Liza Wang
- Opening theme: "Chor Lau-heung" (楚留香) by Adam Cheng
- Composer: Joseph Koo
- Country of origin: Hong Kong
- Original language: Cantonese
- No. of episodes: 65

Production
- Producer: Wong Tin-lam
- Running time: ≈ 40 minutes per episode
- Production company: TVB

Original release
- Network: TVB
- Release: 3 September 1979

Related
- Chor Lau-heung (1985)

Chor Lau-heung (楚留香) is a Hong Kong wuxia television series adapted from the first three novels in the Chu Liuxiang Series by Taiwanese writer Gu Long. Adam Cheng starred as the eponymous character, Chu Liuxiang (Chor Lau-heung). The series was first broadcast on TVB on 3 September 1979. The 65 episodes long series was divided into four parts: The Legend of Wuhua (無花傳奇), The Great Desert (大沙漠), Legend of the Divine Palace (神宮傳奇), and The Final Battle (最後一戰).

== Cast ==
- Adam Cheng as Chu Liuxiang
- Angie Chiu as Su Rongrong
- Liza Wang as Shen Huishan
- Mary Hon as Shen Huilin
- Ng Man-tat as Hu Tiehua
- Ching Hor-wai as Gao Ya'nan
- Ha Yu as Ji Bingyan
- Kwan Chung as Wuhua
- Wong Wan-choi as Nangong Ling
- Wong Shee-tong as Zhongyuan Yidianhong
- Liu On-lai as Song Tian'er
- Ko Miu-see as Li Hongxiu
- Susanna Au-yeung as Heizhenzhu
- Lui Yau-wai as Shuimu Yinji
- Idy Chan as Yan Yan
- Wong Hang-sau as Nangong Yan
- Cheng Lai-fong as Yinqian
- Law Lan as Su Rongrong's mother
- Leung San as Shiguanyin
- Louise Lee as Liu Wumei
- So Hang-syun as Qu Wurong
- Sharon Yeung as Feng Feiyan
- Chan Man-yi as Zhangsun Hong
- Sheung-koon Yuk as Gao Taijun
- Kwan Hoi-san as Gao Guanying
- Bak Man-biu as Gao Guanzhong
- Ho Pik-kin as Gao Guanyong
- Cheung Ying-choi as King of Loulan
- Amy Wu as Queen of Loulan
- Sam-sam as Princess Pipa
- Chan Hung-lit as Ding Tiegan
- Kam Hing-yin as Leng Qiuhun
- Chong Man-ching as Xiaoqing
- Shih Kien as Li Guanyu
- Cheung Chung as Li Yuhan
- Kwok Fung as Shi Tuo
- Kam Kwok-wai as Xiaopan
- Cheung Sang as Renci
- Law Kwok-wai as Hu Anping
- Kwan Kin as Dai Duxing
- Lok Kung as Tianfeng
- Chan Yau-hau as General Min
- Tsui Kwong-lam as Qinghuzi
- Kong Ngai as Bai Yumo
- Lee Kwok-lun as Zhang Baiming
- Tam Chuen-hing as Tianfeng Shisilang
- Ho Kwai-lam as Yu Huhua
- Chu Kong as Sung Kong
- Natalis Chan as Feiying
- Cho Jai as Left Guardian
- Chung Chi-keung as Right Guardian
- Chow Kat as Shi Qilang
- Leung Hung-wah as Sun Xuepu
- King Doi-yum as Yingying

== Lawsuit with RTV ==
When TVB released Chor Lau-heung in 1979, RTV also produced a similar television series, It Takes a Thief. TVB and RTV became involved in copyright lawsuits against each other because of similarities between Chor Lau-heung and It Takes a Thief. TVB won the lawsuits and eventually RTV had to change the Chinese title of It Takes a Thief from 盜帥留香 to 俠盜風流, and the characters' names. It Takes a Thief started airing on 1 September 1979, two days earlier than TVB's Chor Lau-heung.

== Reception ==
The series received positive reviews from viewers in Taiwan after the first two episodes were first aired on CTV as part of the Golden Bell Awards screenings. Following that, CTV acquired rights from Hong Kong's TVB to broadcast the entire series in Taiwan, starting on 18 April 1982, under a Mandarin voice dub.

== Music album ==
Chor Lau-heung (楚留香) is an album by Hong Kong actor and singer Adam Cheng, released by Crown Records in 1979. It contains the main theme song "Chor Lau-heung" and the insert song "Lau-heung's regret" (留香恨) from the television series. RTHK selected the main theme song as one of the Top Ten Gold Songs of 1979. In this album, lyricist Cheng Kwok-kong (鄭國江) is credited as Kong Yu (江羽).

Track title	Length	Composer	Lyrics	Notes
"Chor Lau-heung" 楚留香	3:18	Joseph Koo	Tang Wai-hung and Wong Jim	Main theme song of the 1979 TVB series Chor Lau-heung
"Oh Gal"	3:03		Cheng Kwok-kong	Originally sung in Japanese by Sawada Kenji
"Lau-heung hun" 留香恨 ("Lau-heung's regret")	3:48	Joseph Koo	Tang Wai-Hung	Insert song of the 1979 TVB series Chor Lau-heung
"Nan hing nan dai" 難兄難弟 ("Brothers in times of trouble")	2:48	Joseph Koo	Cheng Kwok-kong	Main theme song of the 1979 TVB series He Ain't Heavy, He's My Brother
"But yiu mun hou hon" 不要問好漢 ("Don't ask a hero")	3:39	Joseph Koo	Wong Jim	Main theme song of the 1979 RTHK series Yiu Wan (妖魂)
"Gip hau ching" 劫後情	3:16		Chan Lai-wan	
"San Lung Ng Fu Jeung" 神龍五虎將	2:55	Joseph Koo	Peter Lai	Main theme song of the 1979 TVB series San Lung Ng Fu Jeung (神龍五虎將)
"Ji yau yuen mei yau fun" 只有緣未有份	3:35	Joseph Koo	Lo Kwok-jim	
"Yeung lau jeung ngo ka yat boon ching yuen" 楊柳像我家一般青綠 ("The willow tree is as green as my home")	4:16	Lo Kwok-jim	Cantonese rendition of "ii nichi tabidachi" (いい日旅立ち) by Yamaguchi Momoe	
"King sum yat siu chung" 傾心一笑中 ("Admiration in a smile")	3:00		Cheng Kwok-kong	
"Koo mung chung wun" 故夢重溫 ("Reminiscing the past")	2:43		Cheng Kwok-kong	
"Chor Lau-heung" (instrumental) 楚留香音樂	3:02	Joseph Koo	N/A	
