= Candice Yu =

Hong Kong actress and singer

- 余安安
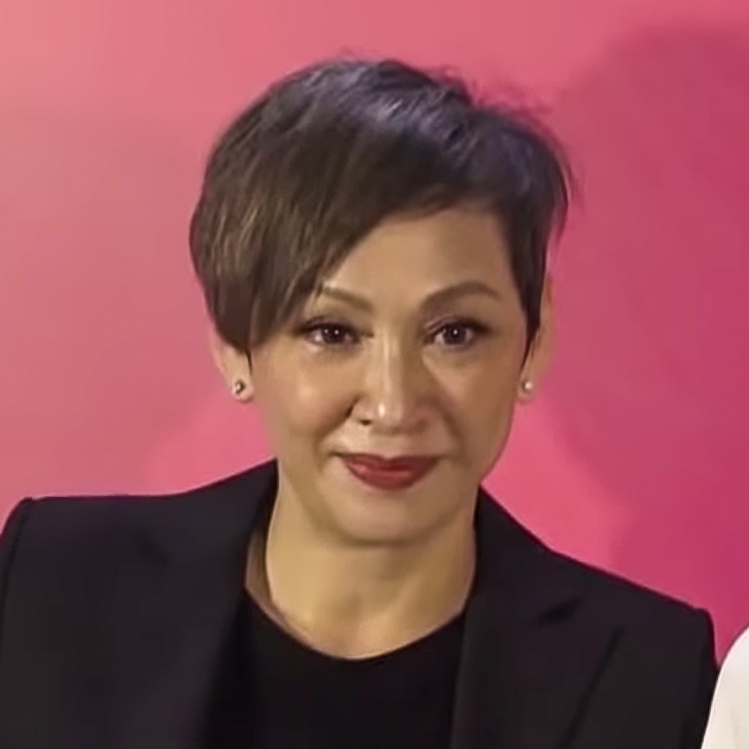
- Yu attending the event "In Diagolue with Nansun Shi" (與施南生對話) on 4 November 2018.
- Born: Yu De Ying; 22 October 1959 (age 66); British Hong Kong
- Occupation: Actress
- Years active: 1976–present
- Spouses: Chow Yun-fat (m. 1983; div. 1983) Henry Lee Junior (m. 1987; div. 2003)
- Children: 2

Candice Yu (Yu On On; born Yu De Ying; 22 October 1959) is a Hong Kong film actress and occasional singer best known for her films with Shaw Brothers Studio of the 1970s and 1980s. She was the first wife of Hong Kong actor Chow Yun-fat.

== Film career ==
Yu made her debut in film at the age of 16 in "Let's Rock" and was instantly signed by the Shaw Brothers Studio in 1976 after starring in the film Massage Girls with Chow Yun-fat, her future husband and in Forever and Ever alongside Alan Tang. Between 1977 and 1979, she starred in six of Chu Yuan's sword films, including Death Duel, The Sentimental Swordsman, Legend of the Bat, Murder Plot and two Heaven Sword and Dragon Sabre films.

In the late 1970s, Yu also began appearing on television, notably the Rediffusion TV series Reincarnated and her appearances as Princess Xiang Xiang in the martial arts series Book and Sword (書劍恩仇錄). In 1984 she portrayed a lesbian in the film Lust for Love of a Chinese Courtesan.

In 1992, Yu had a cameo role in Swordsman 2, directed by Tsui Hark.

Yu retired soon after getting married . In 2005, Yu came out of retirement to appear in Derek Yee's film 2 Young. She has since rekindled her career, appearing in two films in 2006 Rob-B-Hood and My Name Is Fame and four films in 2007, including Whispers And Moans, House of Mahjong, Exodus and Beauty And The 7 Beasts.

Yu received her first Hong Kong Film Award nomination in 2007 for Best Supporting Actress in the film My Name is Fame. In 2011, Yu received a 30th Hong Kong Film Awards Best Supporting Actress nomination for her role in Once a Gangster. In 2012, Yu received a Hong Kong Drama Awards Best Supporting Actress nomination for her performance in The Hong Kong Repertory Theatre's Boundless Movement.

== Personal life ==
In 1983, Yu married Chow Yun-fat, a notable Hong Kong actor, but the marriage only lasted nine months. In 1987, Yu remarried, to a Hong Kong businessman Henry Lee Junior and had two children with him. Yu divorced Lee in 2003 after 16 years of marriage. Yu and Lee have two daughters.

== Filmography ==
- Massage Girls (1976)
- The Legend of the Book and the Sword (1976) (TV)
- The Sentimental Swordsman (1977)
- Forever and Ever (1977)
- Death Duel (1977)
- Deadly Snail Vs Kung Fu Killers (1977)
- The Water Legend (1978)
- Legend of the Bat (1978)
- Kung Fu Master Named Drunk Cat (1978)
- Heaven Sword And Dragon Sabre Part 1 (1978)
- Heaven Sword and Dragon Sabre Part 2 (1978)
- The Gold Dagger Romance (1978)
- The Deadly Sword (1978)
- Young Lovers (1979)
- Writing Kung Fu (1979)
- Murder Plot (1979)
- Disco Fever (1979)
- Reincarnated (1979)
- Fatherland (1980)
- Buddha's Palm (1982)
- Swordsman Adventure (1983)
- Mercenaries from Hong Kong (1983)
- The Black Magic with Buddha (1983)
- Lust for Love of a Chinese Courtesan (1984)
- Journey of the Doomed (1985)
- The Strange Bedfellow (1986)
- The Banquet (cameo) (1991)
- Swordsman II (1992)
- The Spy Dad (2003)
- Love is a Many Stupid Thing (2004)
- Bar Paradise (2005)
- 2 Young (2005)
- Rob-B-Hood (2006)
- My Name Is Fame (2006)
- Whispers and Moans (2007)
- House of Mahjong (2007)
- Exodus (2007)
- Beauty and the 7 Beasts (2007)
- Once a Gangster (2010)
- Bruce Lee, My Brother (cameo) (2010)
- Hi, Fidelity (2011)
- Beach Spike (2011)
- Nightfall (2012)
- Imprisoned: Survival Guide for Rich and Prodigal (2015)
- House of Wolves (2016)
- Buddy Cops (2016)
- Nessun Dorma (2016)
- Tomorrow Is Another Day (2017)
- The Heir to the Throne (2024)
