= Ling Yun (actor) =

Taiwanese actor

- Chinese: 凌雲
- Born: Lin Long-song; January 15, 1941 (age 85); Japanese Formosa (present-day Taiwan)
- Other names: Ling Wan, Ling Lung-Sung, Long Song, Leng Yuen, Warren Ling, Ling Yuen
- Occupation: Actor

Ling Yun (Chinese: 凌雲; born 1941) is a Taiwanese-born actor in Taiwan and Hong Kong.

== Early life ==
On January 15, 1941, Ling was born in Taiwan as Lin Long-song.

== Career ==
Ling started his acting career in Taiwan under the alias of Long Song. Lin first appeared in Ah San Ge Chu Ma (aka A Brother-in-law), a 1959 Hokkien language Taiwan film directed by Lin Tuan-Chiu. Ling joined Shaw Brothers in 1964. In 1965, Ling first appeared in Hong Kong film. Ling appeared in Pink Tears, a 1965 Hong Kong Mandarin-language film directed by Chun Kim. In Hong Kong, Ling changed his name to Ling Yun. Ling's last Hong Kong film was Legend of the Bat (aka Clans of Intrigue 2, Bat Island Adventure), a 1978 Hong Kong Cantonese-language film directed by Chor Yuen. After Ling's film contract expired Shaw Brothers, he continued acting in other studios in Hong Kong and Taiwan.

== Filmography ==
- The Supreme Swordsman (1983)
- The Alliance Of Hung Sect (1982)
- Escape To Freedom (1982)
- My Blade, My Life (1982)
- September Falcon (1982)
- The Stunning Gambling (1982)
- Beauty Escort (1981)
- 1981 The Last Duel - Director.
- A Brotherhood Of Heroes (1980)
- The Eight Escorts (1980)
- Haunted Tales (1980 )
- The Legend Of Broken Sword (1980)
- The Sun Moon Legend (1980)
- Swift Sword (1980)
- The Battle of Guningtou (1979)
- Flying Sword Lee (1979)
- The Legend Of Eight Knights (1979)
- Marvelous Stunts Of Kung Fu (1979)
- Middle Kingdom's Mark Of Blood (1979)
- Monk's Fight (1979)
- The Revenger (1979)
- Big Land, Flying Eagles (1978)
- Boxer's Adventure (1978)
- Clan Of Amazons (1978)
- The Deadly Sword (1978)
- A Hero's Tears (1978)
- Legend of the Bat (1978)
- Moon Night Cutter (1978)
- The Proud Youth (1978)
- Arson - The Criminals, Part III (1977)
- Clans of Intrigue (1977)
- Death Duel (1977)
- Duel In The Desert (1977)
- Orthodox Chinese Kung Fu (1977)
- To Kill A Jaguar (1977)
- The Eternal Obsession (1976)
- The Forbidden Past (1976)
- Heroes Of The Underground (1976)
- Killer Clans (1976)
- Killers On Wheels (1976)
- King Gambler (1976)
- The Last Tempest (1976)
- The Big Hold Up (1975)
- It's All In The Family (1975)
- Temperament Of Life (1975)
- The Cheeky Little Angels (1974)
- Crazy Nuts Of Kung Fu (1974)
- Five Tough Guys (1974)
- Hong Kong 73 (1974)
- Sex, Love And Hate (1974)
- Sorrow Of The Gentry (1974)
- Thirteen (1974)
- Fists of Vengeance (1972)
- Flower in the Rain (1972)
- The Merry Wife (1972)
- I Want To Sing (1971)
- The Long Years (1971)
- Mighty One (1971)
- Six Assassins (1971)
- The Venus Tear Diamond (1971)
- We Love Millionaires (1971)
- Hellgate (1970)
- The Iron Buddha (1970)
- Love Without End (1970)
- Dark Rendezvous (1969)
- Raw Passions (1969)
- Twin Blades Of Doom (1969)
- Unfinished Melody (1969)
- Gun Brothers (1968)
- The Rainbow (1968)
- Hong Kong Nocturne (1967)
- King Drummer (1967)
- The Purple Shell (1967)
- Rose, Be My Love (1966)
- Sweet And Wild (1966)
- Pink Tears (1965)
