= Gu Long =

Taiwanese novelist, screenwriter, film producer and director

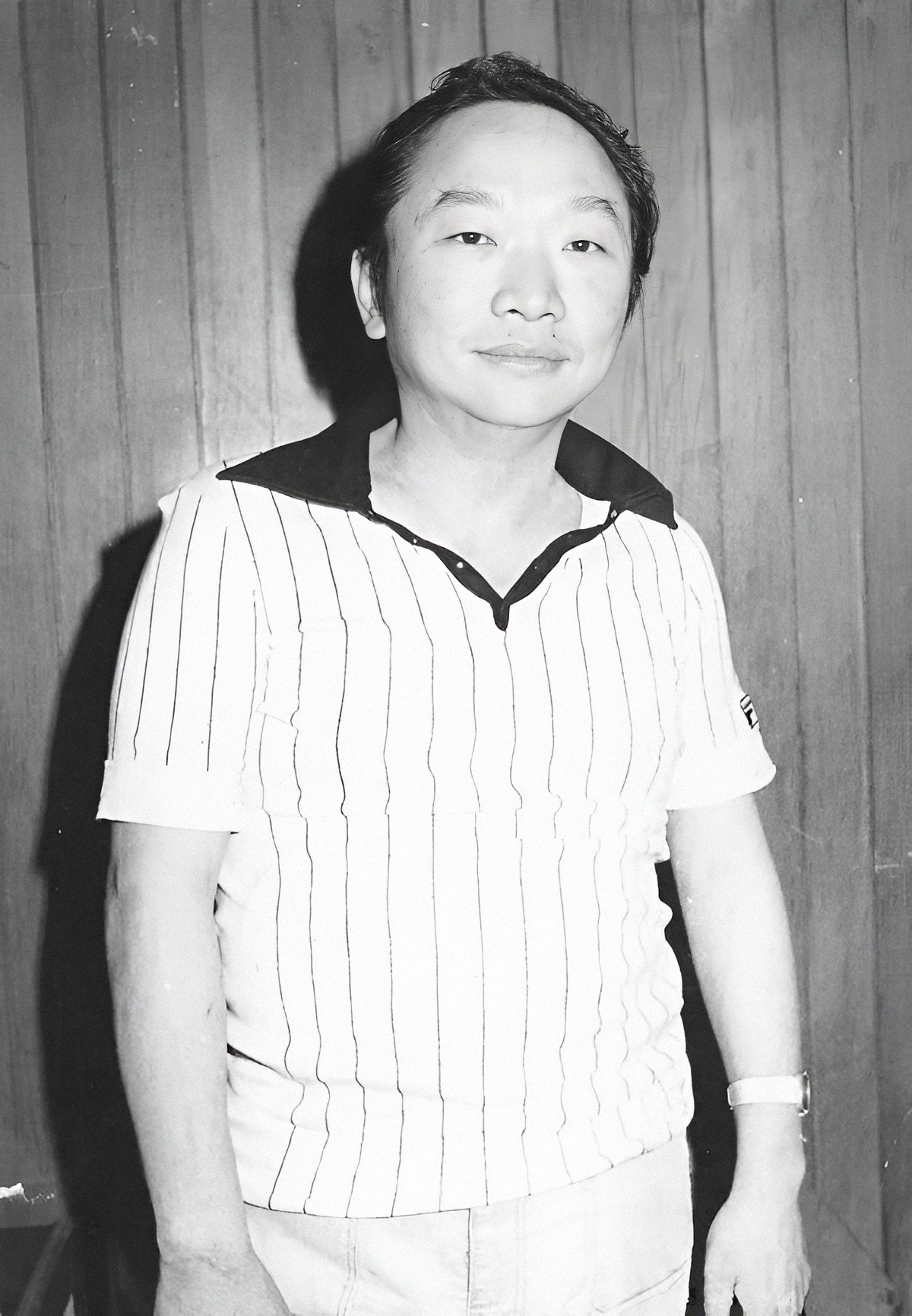
- Gu Long in the 1970s
- Born: Xiong Yaohua; 7 June 1938; Hong Kong
- Died: 21 September 1985 (aged 47); Taipei, Taiwan
- Education: Tamkang University
- Occupation: Writer
- Writing career
- Genre: Wuxia
- Notable works: Chu Liuxiang Series, Lu Xiaofeng Series, Xiaoli Feidao Series, Juedai Shuangjiao, Liuxing Hudie Jian

Gu Long
- Traditional Chinese: 古龍
- Simplified Chinese: 古龙
Transcriptions
Standard Mandarin
- Hanyu Pinyin: Gǔ Lóng
- Wade–Giles: Ku Lung
Yue: Cantonese
- Jyutping: Gu^{2} Lung^{4}

Xiong Yaohua
- Traditional Chinese: 熊耀華
- Simplified Chinese: 熊耀华
Transcriptions
Standard Mandarin
- Hanyu Pinyin: Xióng Yàohuá
- Wade–Giles: Hsiung Yaohua
Yue: Cantonese
- Jyutping: Hung^{4} Jiu^{6} Waa^{4}

Xiong Yaohua (7 June 1938 – 21 September 1985), better known by his pen name Gu Long, was a Taiwanese novelist, screenwriter, film producer and director. Born in Hong Kong and educated at Cheng Kung Senior High School and Tamkang University in Taiwan, he is best known for writing wuxia novels, among which his best known works are Juedai Shuangjiao, the Xiaoli Feidao Series, the Chu Liuxiang Series, the Lu Xiaofeng Series, and The Eleventh Son. Some of them have been adapted into films and television series. In the 1980s, he started his own film studio to produce film adaptations of his works.

== Background ==
Xiong was born on 7 June 1938 in Hong Kong, with ancestry from Nanchang, Jiangxi. He lived in Hankou, Hubei in his childhood before moving to Taipei, Taiwan in 1952 with his parents, who divorced in 1956. With help from his friends and using the money he earned from part-time work to fund his education, Xiong graduated from the Foreign Language Department of Tamkang University.

== Career ==
In 1960, Xiong published his first wuxia novel, Cangqiong Shenjian (蒼穹神劍), under the pen name "Gu Long". From 1960 to 1961, he published eight novels but they were not particularly successful. He moved to Ruifang District and lived there for three years, after which he adopted a new writing style.

Between 1967 and the late 1970s, Xiong rose to prominence as a modern wuxia writer due to the success of his works, being named alongside Jin Yong and Liang Yusheng as the "Three Legs of the Tripod of Wuxia".

== Death ==
In the later part of his life, Xiong suffered from depression and the quality of his works declined rapidly. He had to employ ghostwriters to co-write many of his later works because of his ailing health.

On 21 September 1985, Xiong died at the age of 48 due to illness wrought by alcoholism – namely cirrhosis and oesophageal haemorrhage. At his funeral, his friends brought him 48 bottles of X.O. Cognac.

== Personal life ==
While Xiong was still attending Tamkang University, he lived with a dance hostess, Zheng Yuexia (鄭月霞), and they had a son, Zheng Xiaolong (鄭小龍). Later, he started a relationship with another dance hostess, Ye Xue (葉雪), with whom he had another son, Ye Yikuan (葉怡寬). Shortly after that, he met a senior middle school graduate, Mei Baozhu (梅寶珠), who became his first legal spouse and had a son, Xiong Zhengda (熊正達), with him. His extramarital affairs caused him to break up with Mei eventually.

== Writing style ==
Xiong was influenced not only by earlier wuxia writers such as Wolong Sheng, Zhuge Qingyun and Sima Ling, but also by non-Chinese writers such as Ernest Hemingway, Jack London, John Steinbeck, and Friedrich Nietzsche. His novels are usually made up of short sentences and paragraphs, and mostly dialogues between characters – like a script for a play.

In contrast with Xiong, other wuxia writers such as Jin Yong and Liang Yusheng incorporated Chinese history, culture, and philosophy in their works. Xiong initially intended to mimic them, but changed his decision after being exposed to the James Bond and The Godfather novels. The influence of these works, which relied on the idiosyncrasies of human life, razor-sharp wit, poetic philosophies, mysterious plots, and spine-tingling thrills to achieve success, enabled Xiong to come up with his unique style of writing wuxia novels.

== List of works ==
Some of these works were co-written with other writers.

Standalone novels

- Divine Sword of the Sky (蒼穹神劍)
- Poison of the Sword and Fragrance of Plum Blossoms (劍毒梅香) (Note: Partially ghostwritten by Shangguan Ding)
- Eerie Moon and Evil Star (月異星邪)
- Consort Xiang's Sword (湘妃劍)
- Legend of the Orphaned Star (孤星傳)
- Story of the Lost Soul (失魂引)
- Tale of the Wandering Swordsman (遊俠錄)
- The Flower-Guarding Bell (護花鈴)
- The Tune of the Colourful Ring (彩環曲)
- Broken Gold, Incomplete Jade (殘金缺玉)
- Lingering Fragrance in a Rain of Swords (飄香劍雨)
- Tale of a Remarkable Sword (劍玄錄)
- Journey of a Swordsman (劍客行)
- Cleansing Flowers, Refining the Sword (浣花洗劍錄)
- Lover's Arrow (情人箭)
- The Sword and Exquisiteness (名劍風流)
- Legendary Siblings (絕代雙驕)
- Happy Heroes (歡樂英雄)
- The Celebrity (大人物)
- Meteor, Butterfly, Sword (流星‧蝴蝶‧劍)
- The Seven Killers (七殺手)
- Sword of the Third Young Master (三少爺的劍)
- The Jade Tiger (白玉老虎)
- Carved Jade Dragon (白玉雕龍) (Note: Ghostwritten by Shen Suimei)
- Flying Eagle over the Great Land (大地飛鷹)
- Full Moon and Curved Saber (圓月彎刀)
- Heroes Shed No Tears (英雄無淚)
- The Seven Stars Dragon King (七星龍王)
- The Sounds of the Saber Accompanied by Wind Chimes (風鈴中的刀聲)
- Furious Sword, Mad Flowers (怒劍狂花)
- The Romance of that Sword (那一劍的風情)
- Righteous Blood Cleansing the Silver Spear (碧血洗銀槍)
- Thorn of the Chrysanthemum (菊花的刺)
- Iron Sword Beauty (鐵劍紅顏)
- The Indignant Foal (憤怒的小馬)
- Unofficial History of the Wulin (武林外史)

Little Li Flying Dagger series (小李飛刀系列)

- Sentimental Swordsman, Ruthless Sword (多情劍客無情劍)
- Bordertown Wanderer (邊城浪子)
- Eagle Soaring in the Ninth Month (九月鷹飛)
- Horizon, Bright Moon, Saber (天涯‧明月‧刀)
- Flying Dagger, Flying Dagger Appears Again (飛刀，又見飛刀)

The Eleventh Son series (蕭十一郎系列)

- The Eleventh Son (蕭十一郎)
- To Destroy the Eleventh Son (火併蕭十一郎)

Chu Liuxiang series (楚留香系列)

- The Legend of the Banner Heroes (大旗英雄傳)
- Fragrance in the Sea of Blood (血海飄香)
- The Vast Desert (大沙漠)
- The Thrush (畫眉鳥)
- The Legend of the Bat (蝙蝠傳奇)
- Phantom Love and Heroic Romance (鬼戀俠情)
- The Legend of the Peach Blossom (桃花傳奇)
- The Legend of the New Moon (新月傳奇)
- The Midnight Orchid (午夜蘭花)

Lu Xiaofeng series (陸小鳳系列)

- The Legend of Lu Xiaofeng (陸小鳳傳奇)
- The Embroidery Bandit (繡花大盜)
- Before and After the Duel (決戰前後)
- The Silver Hook Gambling House (銀鈎賭坊)
- Phantom Manor (幽靈山莊)
- The Phoenix Dances in the Nine Heavens (鳳舞九天)
- Laughter of the Sword God (劍神一笑)

Seven Weapons series (七種武器系列)

- The Longevity Sword (長生劍)
- The Peacock Tassel (孔雀翎)
- The Green Jade Saber (碧玉刀)
- The Amorous Ring (多情環)
- The Overlord Spear (霸王槍)
- The Separation Hook (離別鉤)
- The Fist (拳頭)

Grand Era of Wuxia series (大武俠時代)

- Gamble, Wolf's Teeth, Pursue-and-kill (賭局、狼牙、追殺)
- Purple Fumes, Skulk of Foxes (紫煙、群狐)
- Silver Condor, Sea Deity (銀雕、海神)

The Six Shocking Tales series (驚魂六記系列)

- The Blood Parrot (血鸚鵡)
- The Sky Demon Saber (天魔刀)
- The Black Lizard (黑蜥蜴)
- The Crystal Man (水晶人)
- The Powdery Skeleton (粉骷髏)
- The Rakshasa Lady (羅剎女)
- The Wingless Bat (無翼蝙蝠)

== Adaptations of works ==
=== Films ===
- The Jade Faced Assassin 玉面俠 (1971), Juedai Shuangjiao
- Killer Clans 流星·蝴蝶·劍 (1976), Liuxing Hudie Jian
- Clans of Intrigue 楚留香 (1977), Chu Liuxiang Series
- Jade Tiger 白玉老虎 (1977), Bai Yu Lao Hu
- Death Duel 三少爺的劍 (1977)
- The Lost Swordship 飄香劍雨 (1977), Lingering Fragrance in a Rain of Swords
- To Kill with Intrigue 劍·花·煙雨·江南 (1977)
- The Sentimental Swordsman 多情劍客無情劍 (1977), Xiaoli Feidao Series
- Legend of the Bat 楚留香之二蝙蝠傳奇 (1978), Chu Liuxiang Series
- Clan of Amazons 陸小鳳之绣花大盗 (1978), Lu Xiaofeng Series
- The Last Duel 英雄對英雄 (1978), Lu Xiaofeng Series
- Murder Plot 孔雀王朝(1979), Kong Que Wang Chao
- Full Moon Scimitar 新圆月弯刀 (1979), Full Moon Curved Saber
- The Lover's Arrow(ATV ver.)/The Cupid Strikes(RTV ver.) 情人箭 (1979), Lover's Arrow
- The Legend of Broken Sword 折劍傳奇 (1979), Chu Liuxiang Series
- The Proud Twins 绝代雙驕 (1979)
- Chu Liu Hsiang and Hu Tieh Hua 楚留香與胡鐵花 (1980), Chu Liuxiang Series
- Everlasting Chivalry 俠影留香 (1980), Chu Liuxiang Series
- The Sun Moon Legend 新月传奇 (1980), Chu Liuxiang Series
- Middle Kingdom's Mark of Blood 中原一點红 (1980), Chu Liuxiang Series
- Heroes Shed No Tears 英雄無淚 (1980)
- A Sword Named Revenge 名劍風流 (1981)
- Bloody Parrot 血鸚鵡 (1981)
- The Duel of the Century 陸小鳳之决戰前後 (1981), Lu Xiaofeng Series
- Clan Feuds 大旗英雄传 (1982)
- The Spirit of the Sword 浣花洗劍錄 (1982), Wanhua Xijian Lu
- Perils of the Sentimental Swordsman 楚留香之幽靈山莊 (1982), Chu Liuxiang Series
- Demon Fighter 午夜蘭花 (1983)
- The Denouement of Chu Liu Hsiang 楚留香大結局 (1983), Chu Liuxiang Series
- Handsome Siblings 絕代雙驕 (1992), Juedai Shuangjiao
- Butterfly and Sword 流星蝴蝶劍 (1993), Liuxing Hudie Jian
- Legend of the Liquid Sword 笑俠楚留香 (1993), Chu Liuxiang Series
- A Warrior's Tragedy 邊城浪子 (1993), Xiaoli Feidao series
- Clan of Amazon 陸小鳳傳奇之鳳舞九天 (1996), Lu Xiaofeng Series
- The Legend of the Flying Swordsman 小李飛刀之飛刀外傳 (2000), Xiaoli Feidao series
- The Duel 决戰紫禁之巓 (2000), Lu Xiaofeng Series
- The Master Swordsman Returns 陸小鳳第二部曲 - 鳳舞九天 (2002), Lu Xiaofeng spin-off
- Kung Fu Divas (2014), parody of Juedai Shuangjiao
- Sword Master (2016), Sword of the Third Young Master
- Chief of Thieves: Chu Liu Xiang 盗帅楚留香 (2021), Chu Liuxiang series

=== Games ===
- Xin Juedai Shuangjiao series, developed by UserJoy Technology.
- Heroes of Gu Long and Huanxiang Qixia Chuan published by Wayi International Digital Entertainment.
- Meteor Blade, developed by InterServ.
- Huanhua Xijian Lu, developed by Soft-World.
- New Gulong Online, developed by Zealot Digital International Corp and released by IAH in Southeast Asia.
- Gulong Fengyun Lu, developed by Heluo Studio.

=== Television ===
- Luk Siu-fung 陆小凤 (1976), Lu Xiaofeng Series
- Juedai Shuangjiao 绝代双骄 (1977), Juedai Shuangjiao
- The Romantic Swordsman 小李飞刀 (1978), Xiaoli Feidao Series
- Siu Sak Yaklong蕭十一郎 (1978), The Eleventh Son Series
- Chor Lau-heung 楚留香 (1979), Chu Liuxiang Series
- The Twins 绝代双骄 (1979), Juedai Shuangjiao
- Wan Fa Sai Kim Luk (1979), Wanhua Xijian Lu
- The New Adventures of Chor Lau-heung 楚留香之蝙蝠传奇 (1984), Chu Liuxiang Series
- Chor Lau-heung 楚留香新传 (1985), Chu Liuxiang Series
- Xin Juedai Shuangjiao 新绝代双骄 (1986), Juedai Shuangjiao
- The Return of Luk Siu-fung 陆小凤之凤舞九天 (1986), Lu Xiaofeng Series
- Fury Of The Dragon 冷月剑无言 (1987), Happy Heroes
- Two Most Honorable Knights 绝代双骄 (1988), Juedai Shuangjiao
- The Black Sabre (1989), Xiaoli Feidao series
- Against the Blade of Honour 圆月弯刀 (1994), Yuanyue Wandao
- Chor Lau-heung 香帅传奇 (1995), Chu Liuxiang Series
- The Romantic Swordsman 小李飞刀 (1995), Xiaoli Feidao Series
- Fan ren Yang Datou (no English title) (1996), 大人物
- Mission of the Warriors 武林外史 (2001), Unofficial History of the Wulin
- Master Swordsman Lu Xiaofeng 陆小凤之决战前后 (2001), Lu Xiaofeng Series
- Master Swordsman Lu Xiaofeng 2 陆小凤之凤舞九天 (2001), Lu Xiaofeng Series
- The New Adventures of Chor Lau-heung 新楚留香 (2001), Chu Liuxiang Series
- The Legendary Siblings 绝代双骄 (2002), Juedai Shuangjiao
- The Legendary Siblings 2 绝世双骄 (2002), Juedai Shuangjiao
- Treasure Raiders (2002) (CTV version), 蕭十一郎 (Xiao Shi Yi Lang)
- Treasure Raiders (2005) (TVB version), 蕭十一郎 (Xiao Shi Yi Lang)
- Flying Daggers 飞刀又见飞刀 (2003), Xiaoli Feidao Series
- Meteor, Butterfly, Sword 流星‧蝴蝶‧劍 (2003), (Liu Xing, Hu Die, Jian)
- The Proud Twins 小鱼儿与花无缺 (2005), Juedai Shuangjiao
- The Tearful Sword 淚痕劍 (2006), Heroes Shed No Tears (英雄無淚)
- The Legend of Lu Xiaofeng 陆小凤传奇 (2006), Lu Xiaofeng Series
- The Legend of Chu Liuxiang 楚留香传奇 (2007), Chu Liuxiang Series
- The Banner Heroes (2007), Da Qi Ying Xiong Zhuan
- Da Ren Wu (Big Shot) (2007), The Celebrity(大人物)
- The Spirit of the Sword (2007), Wanhua Xijian Lu
- The Legend of Brown Sugar Chivalries 黑糖瑪奇朵 (2008)
- Meteor, Butterfly, Sword 流星‧蝴蝶‧劍 (2010), (Liu Xing, Hu Die, Jian)
- Kong Que Ling 七種武器系列 (2011) (Qizhong Wuqi)
- The Legend of Chu Liuxiang 楚留香新传 (2012), Chu Liuxiang Series
- Full Moon Scimitar 新圆月弯刀 (2012), Full Moon Curved Saber
- The Magic Blade 天涯‧明月‧刀 (2012), (Tianya Mingyue Dao - Horizon, Bright Moon, Sabre), Xiaoli Feidao Series (Fu Hong Xue)
- Detective and Doctors 陆小凤与花满楼 (2015), Lu Xiaofeng Series
- Xin Xiao Shi Yi Lang 新萧十一郎 (2016), Xiao Shi Yi Lang series
- Border Town Prodigal (2016), Xiaoli Feidao Series (Ye Kai & Fu Hong Xue)
- The Legend of Flying Daggers 小李飛刀系列 (2016), Xiaoli Feidao Series (Li Huai)
- The Lost Swordship 飄香劍雨 (2017), Lingering Fragrance in a Rain of Swords
- Handsome Siblings 絕代雙驕 (2020), Juedai Shuangjiao
- The Legend of Lu Xiaofeng 凤舞九天 (2026), Fengwu Jiutian

== Translations of works ==
Xiong's works have been translated into many languages such as French, English and Vietnamese:

- The Eleventh Son, English translation of Xiao Shiyilang, ISBN 1-931907-16-1.
- Les quatre brigands du Huabei, French translation of Huanle Yingxiong, ISBN 2-87730-371-3

== See also ==
- Jin Yong
- Liang Yusheng
