= Spy with My Face =

1966 Hong Kong film by Chor Yuen

Chinese name
- Traditional Chinese: "黑玫瑰與黑玫瑰"
Transcriptions
Standard Mandarin
- Hanyu Pinyin: Hēi méiguī yǔ hēi méiguī
- Directed by: Chor Yuen
- Screenplay by: Poon Fan
- Produced by: Nam Hung
- Starring: Patrick Tse; Nam Hung; Connie Chan Po-Chu
- Cinematography: Chan Kon
- Edited by: Choi Cheong
- Music by: Yue Lun
- Production company: Rose Motion Picture Company
- Release date: 4 June 1966 (Hong Kong)
- Running time: 101 minutes
- Country: Hong Kong
- Language: Cantonese

Spy with My Face (Chinese: 黑玫瑰與黑玫瑰; pinyin: Hēi méiguī yǔ hēi méiguī; lit. 'Black Rose vs. Black Rose'), also known as The Spy with My Face or Who Is That Rose?, is a 1966 Hong Kong crime film directed by Chor Yuen. It is the sequel to the 1965 film The Black Rose.

== Plot ==
The film begins by replaying segments of the final scene from The Black Rose in which Cheung Man-Fu departs on a train. Director Chor Yuen then speaks to the camera to introduce the film.

Cheung Man-Fu arrives at home, but is kidnapped. His kidnappers, led by a man dressed in a sequined outfit and hood covering his face, replace Cheung Man-Fu with a man who has had his face surgically altered to be identical to Cheung Man-Fu's face. Cheung Man-Fu's double goes to Cheung Man-Fu's office at the Gold Star Insurance Company and photographs important documents.

When the gang attacks and kidnaps the Chans' nurse maid, the Chan sisters infiltrate the gang's compound to rescue her, but are likewise captured and imprisoned by the gang.

When Cheung Man-Fu and his double are in the same room, sisters knock out the double and dress up Cheung Man-Fu in his clothes, enabling them to freely travel around the gang's compound. The sisters leave the compound and return wearing their Black Rose outfits, then battle the gang and the boss.

== Cast ==
- Nam Hung as Chan Mei-Yi
- Patrick Tse as Cheung Man-Fu and "#1"
- Connie Chan as Chan Mei-Ling
- Cheung Wood-Yau as the boss
- Fung Ngai as Mute gang member
- Lok Gung as Detective
- Lai Man as the Chans' nurse maid
- Leung Ming as Detective Fu
- Cheung Chi-Suen as Boss at office
- Little Unicorn as Gang member
- Leung Siu-Chung as Gang member
- Fung Mei-Ying as Female gang member
- Wong Hon (黃侃) as Gang member
- Nam Fung as Female gang member
- Man Leng as Driver
- Ho Pak-Kwong as Gang member
- Fung Ming as Policeman
- Chor Yuen as himself
- Hoh Wan as Policeman
- Chow Siu-Loi as Gang member
- Woo Ping as Office clerk
- Simon Chui Yee-Ngau as Gang member
- Yeung Chun-Sing as Gang member
- Lam Yuk as Gang member
- Leung Lung as Gang member
- Tung Choi-Bo as Gang member
- Tang Cheung as Policeman

== Production ==
The film was produced by the Rose Motion Picture Company, which Chor Yuen co-founded together with star Nam Hung. The film was originally shot in colour, but no colour copies have survived.

== Release ==
The film was released in Hong Kong on 4 June 1966.

== Sequels ==
The film was followed by a sequel titled To Rose with Love (1967), also directed by Chor Yuen. The series was revived in the 1990s with the film 92 Legendary La Rose Noire (1992), Rose Rose I Love You (1993) and Black Rose II (1997). The series was revived again as a vehicle for the pop duo Twins with the film Protégé de la Rose Noire (2004).

== Reception ==
In the book Oral History Series 7: When the Wind Was Blowing: Wild Hong Kong Cinema, the films Black Rose, Spy with My Face and To Rose with Love are described as "sensational and intimate contemporary features [...] that center around heroines".

Tars Tarkas gave the film a rating of 9 out of 10, writing, "The sequel to 1965's Black Rose has a greatly expanded scope, as the Chan sisters go from being champions of the poor to outright superheroes who take down a sinister secret gang intent on robbing jewelry from all over the city. The James Bond influence is very heavy, as there are a lot of gadgets, microbombs, disguises, and hidden identities. The film also has what sounds like an original score that is rather well done as well (and also Bond influenced)." The review also notes that "Spy With My Face is notable because this film was where Connie Chan eclipsed Nam Hung and became a bona fide Hong Kong superstar."

Comparing the sequel with the original film The Black Rose, Peter Nepstad of theilluminatedlantern.com wrote, "The tight pacing, clever capers, and social commentary of the first film are totally dispensed of, and replaced with bargain basement Bond villain paraphernalia, and the result is singularly disappointing. [...] THE SPY WITH MY FACE seems the victim of a transplant surgery gone awry: the gadgets, fights, and supervillains of a Bond film were grafted on to the world of the women avengers, which had the rich on one side, the poor on the other, and only the Black Rose in between. The result was unsuccessful on both counts. The social milieu of the first film is completely forgotten, while the Bond trappings are chinsy and unconvincing -- though, this observation may be unfair, as I have only seen the film in black & white, but apparently it was shot and released in glorious color. Still, the large amount of standing around talking and the low amount of action in THE SPY WITH MY FACE suggests that even with color it would be a lesser effort than the Shaw Brother's Mandarin language Bond effort from the same year, THE GOLDEN BUDDHA (1966). This despite the fact that that acting talent in SPY is far superior: in addition to Nam Hung and Connie Chan, the handsome Patrick Tse far smoother than the wooden Paul Chang Chung."

In an article on Jane Bond films on liner-notes.com, the author wrote, "In the sequel, Chor Yuen became more indulgent with 007-style gadgets and gimmicks. The chic outfits were delectable, but it failed to evoke the same kind of sentimental feelings as its predecessor. [...] This sequel to Black Rose further sets the Jane Bond genre on its course. Director Chor Yuen, emboldened by the success of the original, takes the Bond influence up a notch. The arch villain is not just a crooked businessman, but the head of a powerful crime syndicate, lording over an army of thugs while headquartering in a secret hideout equipped with an endless array of high/low-tech devices. Connie Chan Po-chu, with her embodiment of both the fairy Jade Girl and the fierce fighting woman, eclipses Nam Hung as the film's true star, establishing herself as the Jane Bond prototype."

Asia Pacific Center included the film in their list of top 10 Asian James Bond knock-offs, writing, "The sequel to the legendary Cantonese film The Black Rose, Chor Yuen's The Spy with My Face has secret underground lairs, sadistic villains, and a pair of dazzling heroines. A classic of the 'Jane Bond' cycle in Hong Kong cinema and a defining moment of 1960s youth culture, The Spy with My Face stars Nam Hung and Connie Chan Po-chu, one of the biggest teen idols of her time."

Describing "other James Bonds", Sayantan Modal of the website livemint.com wrote, "Unlike other industries that were churning out male James Bonds, Hong Kong gave us the Jane Bond films, highly popular from 1965-68. It all started with Chor Yuen’s The Black Rose (1965) but it was the sequel, The Spy With My Face, that makes the premise more Bond-like. In it, the protagonists from the first film, the Robin Hood-esque sisters Chan Meiling and Chan Meiyu (played by Nam Hung and Connie Chan), take on a sinister villain called Golden Yanluo and his organisation that want to rob the city of all its jewels."
