= The Black Rose (1965 film) =

1965 Hong Kong film by Chor Yuen

Chinese name
- Traditional Chinese: 黑玫瑰
Transcriptions
Standard Mandarin
- Hanyu Pinyin: Hēi méiguī
- Directed by: Chor Yuen
- Screenplay by: Ho Bik-Kin
- Produced by: Nam Hung
- Starring: Nam Hung; Patrick Tse; Connie Chan
- Cinematography: Chan Kon
- Edited by: Choi Cheong
- Music by: Yue Lun
- Production company: Rose Motion Picture Company
- Release date: 3 October 1965 (Hong Kong)
- Running time: 93 minutes
- Country: Hong Kong
- Language: Cantonese

The Black Rose (Chinese: 黑玫瑰; pinyin: Hēi méiguī; lit. 'Black Rose'), also known as Black Rose, is a 1965 Hong Kong crime film directed by Chor Yuen. The film was highly influential in the creation of the "Jane Bond" genre of films and has spawned several sequels and parodies.

== Plot ==
The sisters Chan Mei-Ling and Chan Mei-Yi steal from the rich, leaving behind a black rose as their calling card, and give help to the poor. At a masquerade ball at the Chans' home, Chan Mei-Ling dresses up as the Black Rose, explaining that it is merely a costume for the masquerade ball. The power suddenly goes out and a guest named Mr Li claims that a valuable sapphire has been stolen from him by the Black Rose. Mei-Yi dresses up in a Black Rose costume and overhears Mr Li scheming to obtain an insurance payout for the sapphire, so she holds him at gunpoint and forces him to give her the gemstone. Mr Li is unable to report the robbery because he has already reported the sapphire as being stolen in order to obtain the insurance payout. Mei-Yi warns him to start being an honest man and to stop smuggling, evading taxes and selling drugs or else the Black Rose will come back for him. When Mei-Ling returns home from distributing money in the slums, Mei-Yi takes her place and heads out to do good deeds. She gives money to a mother and child whose husband has died and fights off a gang of men who are harassing a woman.

The next day, the two sisters entertain numerous wealthy male suitors and flirt with them to be given their money. Cheung Man-Fu, a private investigator from the Gold Star Insurance Company, arrives to investigate the theft of the sapphire. At that moment, the elderly Mr Yaung receives a phone call that the Black Rose has left a letter for him threatening to take his jade seal at midnight that night because it is a cultural artifact that belongs to the country. Mr Yeung then suffers an allergic reaction and must be wrapped in gauze and taken to his bed at home. He tells Cheung Man-Fu that he only ate a bowl of soup at the Miss Chan's house that day and gives him the combination to his safe so that Cheung Man-Fu can hold the jade seal in his safekeeping. Cheung Man-Fu puts the jade seal in his jacket pocket, and he and the police sergeant retire to the sitting room to wait for midnight, leaving Mr Yeung alone. Detective Ceng Ming proudly admires the multitude police officers stationed in and around the house, insisting that the Black Rose will never be able to enter. Detective Wong Sing says that he thinks that the Black Rose has already entered the house. Meanwhile, Mei-Yi dressed as the Black Rose examines a set of exterior glass doors leading into Mr Yeung's bedroom.

Near midnight, Cheung Man-Fu proudly proclaims that the jade seal cannot be stolen and returns it to the hands of the bedridden Mr Yang. At precisely midnight, Mei-Yi dressed as the Black Rose is seen outside the glass door. The police open the glass doors to chase after her, leaving detective Ceng Ming to guard Mr Yeung by himself. Ceng Ming cautiously closes the glass doors and tightly grips a gun as he shakes in fear. The police chase the Black Rose through the woods and into a dilapidated house. There they find Mr Yeung tied up, who says that the Black Rose brought him there that afternoon. He asks about the jade seal, and Cheung Man-Fu realises that he has fallen for the Black Rose's trap. Back at Mr Yeung's home, the bandaged person in bed beckons Ceng Ming to come closer, then knocks him out. Removing the bandages, it is revealed to be the Mei-Ling, who ties up Ceng Ming and leaves him in bed in her place. Upon returning, Cheung Man-Fu notices a black hair on the bed and follows his intuition back to the home of the Chan sisters, where he sees Mei-Ling removing her Black Rose outfit.

Cheung Man-Fu brings the police sergeant and several policemen to the home of the Chans and accuses Mei-Ling of being the Black Rose. The men search the home and find her Black Rose outfit, but she laughs and explains that it was a costume for the masquerade ball, which the police sergeant confirms. They suddenly receive a call that the Black Rose is robbing houses in the West District. Cheung Man-Fu notices that Mei-Yi is not around and demands to see her. They knock on Mei-Yi's bedroom door, where Mei-Yi answers. Cheung Man-Fu and the police leave, and Mei-Yi explains that she called the police herself after her robberies and then rushed home.

The next day, Cheung Man-Fa follows a person who is drawing arrows on walls around the city. He eventually reaches the house where they found Mr Yeung. He is tricked into giving up his gun by Mei-Ling, who reveals that she and her sister are the Black Rose. The sisters tell him to leave and not interfere with their affairs, which he agrees to do. That night, Mei-Ling tells Cheung Man-Fa about the sisters' history as travelling circus performers whose father was framed by a corrupt politician, leading to his suicide and their mother's death of poverty and illness. The sisters then chose to adopt the persona of the Black Rose to combat injustice. Mei-Ling returns the jade seal to Cheung Man-Fa so that he will not be disgraced.

Mei-Yi sneaks into the boot of Cheung Man-Fa's car and rides with him to Mr Li's home, where Cheung Man-Fa is knocked out by Mr Li and taken to a secret location where he stores his opium. Mr Li beats Cheun Man-Fa and demands to know the identity of the Black Rose. The sisters don their Black Rose outfits, break into Mr Li's house and force his wife to tell them where hr took Cheung Man-Fa. The sisters reach the secret location and confuse the kidnappers by shouting from and appearing in different locations. Together they distract the kidnappers long enough for the police to arrive, who discover the jade seal in Mr Li's bag as well as a discarded Black Rose outfit. The police arrest Mr Li and his men, accusing them of being behind the Black Rose's crimes.

The next day, the sergeant apologises to the sisters for accusing them of being the Black Rose and states that he has now caught the real criminals responsible for the crimes. A subordinate then rushes in to tell him that the Black Rose was spotted committing thefts in the East District again the previous night. The sisters and Cheung Man-Fa tell each other that they hope to see each other again someday, then Cheung Man-Fa boards a train and leaves.

== Cast ==
- Patrick Tse as Cheung Man-Fu
- Nam Hung as Chan Mei-Yi
- Connie Chan as Chan Mei-Ling
- Lee Pang-Fei as Lee
- Yeung Yip-Wang as Yeung
- Chow Gat as Party guest, admirer
- Lai Man as the Chans' nurse maid
- Fung Ging-Man as Gang member
- Sze-Ma Wah-Lung as Inspector
- Lui Ming as Detective Ceng Ming
- Chu Siu-Boh as Detective
- Wong Hon (黃侃) as Detective Wong Sing
- Cheung Chi-Suen as Doctor
- Fung Wai-Man as Mrs Lee
- Wan Ling-Kwong as Party guest, admirer
- Lau Chun as Party guest
- Man Leng as Police officer
- Lam Siu as Party guest, admirer
- Chow Luen as Party guest, admirer
- Fung Mei-Ying as Chans' servant
- Little Unicorn as Rascal
- Lau Kar-Wing as Rascal
- Chan Siu-Pang as Rascal
- Tong Kai as Rascal
- Lau Kar-Leung as Rascal
- Tang Cheung as Lee's thug
- Fung Ming as Policeman at party
- Lam Yuen as Party guest

== Production ==
The film was produced by the Rose Motion Picture Company, which Chor Yuen co-founded together with star Nam Hung. The film was shot in black and white.

== Release ==
The film was released in Hong Kong on 3 October 1965.

== Sequels ==
The film was followed by two direct sequels, Spy with My Face (1966) and To Rose with Love (1967), both also directed by Chor Yuen. The series was revived in the 1990s with the film 92 Legendary La Rose Noire (1992), Rose Rose I Love You (1993) and Black Rose II (1997). The series was revived again as a vehicle for the pop duo Twins with the film Protégé de la Rose Noire (2004).

== Reception ==
Tars Tsarkas gave the film a rating of 7/10, writing, "Considering the hype and the love heaped upon the Black Rose films, I was surprised that the original entry here is so simple. It is obvious the budget wasn't stellar at all, but it showed how much you can do with a small budget and make your film appear larger in scope."

An extensive review on the website tomstadtman.com states that "even at this relatively youthful stage in his career, working within the tight budgetary constraints of the Cantonese language film industry of the sixties, Chor demonstrates a sensitive stylistic touch that suffuses this irresistible pulp confection with a palpable sense of elegance, glamour and romance. With The Black Rose, Chor performed an innovative trick of genre alchemy, taking the female-centric swashbuckling of early wuxia cinema and the populist heroics of Chinese folklore and placing them in a contemporary urban setting. [...] One need only look at some of the other, comparatively slap-dash products of the industry at the time to see why The Black Rose, with its lustrous, handsome and meticulously-crafted look, was a solid stand-out, as well as a big box office hit."

The Government of the Hong Kong Special Administrative Region wrote, "Many of [Chor's] works also reflected the situation of society and familial relationships of the time. [...] "Black Rose" (1965) tells the story of a heroic outlaw who robs the rich to help the poor, reflecting how individuals' strength can change the environment."

In her book Historical Dictionary Of Hong Kong Cinema, author Lisa Odham Stokes wrote, "Directed by Chor Yuen (among his best action) and starring Nam Hung and Chan Po-chu, The Black Rose/Hak mui gwai/Hei mei gui started a brief mid-1960s phenomenon of fantasy entertainment with spies, secret weapons, and gadgetry. The movie and its sequel Who Is That Rose? (1966) were Hong Kong's answer to the James Bond movies, with Alfred Hitchcock's To Catch a Thief (1955) thrown in. The plot of the first combined insurance fraud, spies, an amoral drug dealer (Li Pengfei), a jewel thief, an acrobatic swordsman, and a stoical inspector (Patrick Tse Yin). Its comic book quality derived from its source material, Oriole, the Flying Heroine, a popular pulp fiction series. Loosely connected action, set pieces with choreographed fights, car chases, and games of cat and mouse were linked by verbal repartee, an enjoyable lifestyle, and pairing with a bimbo male love interest, the inspector."

In the book Oral History Series 7: When the Wind Was Blowing: Wild Hong Kong Cinema, the films Black Rose, Spy with My Face and To Rose with Love are described as "sensational and intimate contemporary features [...] that center around heroines".

== Legacy and influence ==
The Hong Kong Film Archive operated by the Government of the Hong Kong Special Administrative Region noted, "The film is also the prototype of the 'Jane Bond' film, one of the most intriguing genres in the history of Hong Kong cinema. Again, Chor Yuen finds himself in the middle of major transitions."

In her essay "SOS Hong Kong: Coproducing Espionage Films in Cold War Asia" in the book Remapping the Cold War in Asian Cinemas, author Sangjoon Lee wrote, "In the Cantonese cinema world, a female version of James Bond, the protagonist in the Jane Bond cycle, came into being in the latter half of the 1960s. Black Rose (1965) was the initiating force of this cycle, followed by its sequel Spy with My Face (1966) and other commercially successful ones, including The Dark Heroine Muk Lan-fa (1966) and The Precious Mirror (1967)."

Tars Tsarkas wrote that the film "did not start the strong female character/super hero genre, but popularized it to the point where Black Rose is known as the standard bearer of the genre."

In his essay Licensed to Kick Men: The Jane Bond Films, Sam Ho wrote that The Black Rose and its sequels sparked the action-crime boom in Hong Kong cinema.

In the book Screening Communities: Negotiating Narratives of Empire, Nation, and the Cold War in Hong Kong Cinema. Vol. 2, author Chang Jing Jing writes, "As a spoof on James Bond-style spy and detective films that were an international trend at the time, Black Rose has been situation by some critics as the harbinger of the mid-1960s subgenre known locally as 'Jane Bond' films."

In the book Nostalgic Humor and Cultural Memory in the Remakes of Hong Kong Jane Bond Films, author Jessica Siu-yin Yeung wrote, "Black Rose in Chor Yuen's The Black Rose (1965), Spy with My Face (1966), and To Rose with Love (1967) is central to Jeff Lau's comedy remakes, as in 92 Legendary La Rose Noire (1992), Rose Rose I Love You (Pang dir., Lau as producer, 1993), and Black Rose II (Lau and Yuen 1997). Chor's trilogy has an enduring influence on Hong Kong popular culture, including cinema, media, and Cantopop (Lai 1997, 97)." This statement is based on the statement made by Linda Chiu-han Lai in her essay "Nostalgia and nonsense: Two instances of commemorative practices in Hong Kong cinema in the early 1990s" in the book Fifty Years of Electric Shadows (1997).

Many films reference or parody The Black Rose. Todd Stadtman wrote, "The impact that The Black Rose had on Hong Kong cinema can be traced through the numerous knock-offs, re-imaginings and homages to the film that have sprung up in its wake over the intervening years. In addition to The Spy With My Face, a direct sequel which Chor Yuen shot with the same cast the following year, the film's success inspired the Shaw Brothers studio to produce a virtual remake—though in period drag—in the form of 1968's The Black Butterfly".

In a review of Naked Killer (1992), reviewer Andrew Pragasam wrote that "the master-student relationship, ninja gadgetry and fantastical headquarters reference The Black Rose (1965), a hugely popular and influential superheroine series." In a review of The Dark Heroine Mun Lak-fa, reviewer Tars Tsarkas wrote, "How much is cribbed from the Black Rose films? A lot." In a review of The Beauty's Evil Roses, Andrew Pragasam wrote, "A hybrid kung fu-horror-soft-core porn-fantasy-cop thriller it is also tangentially a parody of the classic superhero serial Black Rose (1965). Indeed the film was released, most likely not by coincidence, the same year as another more high-profile Black Rose parody: Jeff Lau's multilayered nostalgia comedy '92 Legendary Rose Noire which went on to win best picture at the Hong Kong Film Awards. Lau's film also inspired the later teen comedy Protégé de la Rose Noire (2004), a vehicle for bubblegum Cantopop duo Twins."

== Inspiration for real-life superheroines ==
Multiple women have taken to performing good deeds by providing money, food, clothing and blankets to the poor while wearing masks to avoid the appearance of seeking attention. These women have been dubbed "real-life superheroines" by the media.

An article titled "Superwoman on a mission to fight poverty" in the South China Morning Post tells of a real-life masked woman handing out money to the poor who was inspired by the film The Black Rose. The article reads, "She's the tai-tai with a heart of a gold, a love of Hong Kong 1960s cinema and, evidently, lots of cash to spare. What we don't know, though, is her real name and where she gets all the money that she has been seen doling out to the city's poorest residents, handfuls at a time. Dressed in a basque, gloves and boots, the masked woman who calls herself the 'Bauhinia Heroine' says she has given away HK$8,000 in food and cash to cage residents, as seen on YouTube and in reports carried by the Chinese media. Contacted via email by the Sunday Morning Post, she agreed to an interview yesterday. But she refused to disclose her identity, saying only that she was a businesswoman who earned hundreds of thousands of dollars a month. 'I know journalists have started following me... I am worried people might think I just want to be famous if they know who I am,' she said. 'But I am not. I just want to help the poor.' Her persona is modelled on the Black Rose, a 1965 film starring Connie Chan Po-chu as a character of the same name who steals from the rich to give to the poor. But the Bauhinia Heroine says that the money she is seen giving away on YouTube is entirely her own."

Another woman calling herself "Beijing Buahinia" and likewise inspired by The Black Rose was reported to be performing similar acts of kindness by giving out money, food, blankets and clothing to the poor in Beijing while wearing a mask and disguise.
