= Lan Kwong Film Company =

Hong Kong Cantonese-language film production company (1959–1968)

- Native name: 嶺光影業公司
- Type: Private
- Industry: Film production
- Founded: 1959 in Hong Kong
- Founder: Wong Cheuk-hon (黃卓漢)
- Defunct: 1968 (approx.)
- Successor: First Film Organisation (第一影業機構)
- Headquarters: Hong Kong
- Products: Motion pictures (53 films produced)

Lan Kwong Film Company (嶺光影業公司) was a Hong Kong-based Cantonese-language film production company active from 1959 to approximately 1968. Founded by producer Wong Cheuk-hon (黃卓漢; Mandarin: Huang Zhuohan), the company produced 53 films — predominantly urban satirical comedies depicting contemporary Hong Kong society across all social classes — and pioneered Hong Kong–South Korea co-productions during the 1960s.

Lan Kwong represented the middle phase of Wong's five-decade film career, following his Mandarin-language Liberty Film Company (自由影業公司, 1952–1958) and preceding his Taiwan-based First Film Organisation (第一影業機構, founded 1967). The company launched the careers of several figures who became significant in Hong Kong entertainment, including Alan Tang, Paul Chu Kong, and Helena Law Lan. The Hong Kong Film Archive (HKFA) described Lan Kwong as one of "the more important Cantonese film companies of the 1960s", and in 2024 mounted a major retrospective of Wong's work, with several Lan Kwong titles presented in 2K digital restoration.

== History ==
=== Background: Wong Cheuk-hon and Liberty Film Company ===
Wong Cheuk-hon was born on 25 January 1920 in Chaozhou, Guangdong Province. He earned a Bachelor of Laws from Guangdong National University (廣州國民大學) and pursued a varied pre-cinema career that included teaching at a Vietnamese overseas Chinese school, serving as a Lieutenant Colonel Secretary at the General Political Department of the Ministry of National Defense in wartime Chongqing, and working as deputy editor-in-chief of the Yishi Bao (益世報) newspaper in Nanjing.

Wong arrived in Hong Kong in 1949, where an attempt to establish a newspaper failed. He turned to cinema, becoming manager of the China Theatre (中華戲院) and entering the film business as a distributor and producer. His early work included the production Tears of a Loving Mother (慈母淚, 1953).

In 1952, Wong founded Liberty Film Company (自由影業公司) to produce Mandarin-language films. Liberty's debut, The Secret Life of Lady So Lee (名女人別傳, 1953), starred newcomer Helen Li Mei (李湄). Wong established actor training classes alongside director Chin Chien (秦劍), discovering Jeanette Lin Tsui (林翠), who was cast as the lead in Sweet Seventeen (女兒心, 1954) and became a major Mandarin film star. Liberty was technically ambitious: The Mermaid Princess (龍女, 1957) was Hong Kong's first 35mm Eastmancolor film, shot with an invited Japanese cinematographer, and Wong was the first Hong Kong filmmaker to shoot on location in Taiwan. However, Liberty's final production, Miss Chow Shun (甘蔗姑娘, 1958) — also Taiwan's first 35mm colour film — suffered severe losses due to overseas distribution difficulties, effectively bankrupting the company.

=== Founding and market strategy ===
The founding of Lan Kwong in 1959 was a strategic response to the competitive landscape of Hong Kong filmmaking. By the late 1950s, Shaw Brothers and Motion Picture & General Investment (MP&GI/電懋) had consolidated near-total dominance over Mandarin-language film production in Hong Kong, making it extremely difficult for independent producers to compete. As the HKFA's Hong Kong Filmography Vol. V (1960–1964) explains, Wong recognised that quality Cantonese films could be produced at roughly the same budget as mediocre Mandarin films. By redirecting his Mandarin-level investment into the Cantonese market, he could achieve superior production values in a segment where competition was less overwhelming.

The strategy was enabled by Kong Ngee Company (光藝機構), a major Singapore-based distribution organisation with cinema circuits across Southeast Asia, which provided distribution support for Lan Kwong's output. The company's films screened on the prestigious Universal/Tai Ping Circuit (環球、太平院線), the premier exhibition chain for quality Cantonese literary and modern-dress films, alongside productions from Union Film (中聯), Sun Luen (新聯), Kong Ngee itself, and Overseas Chinese Film Company (華僑).

The HKFA's Filmography Vol. V preface described Lan Kwong as "the latest contender" of the 1960s, noting that its "family melodramas left the terrain of the extended feudal family to address issues pertinent to the nuclear family and hit a nerve with contemporary audiences."

=== Decline and closure ===
Lan Kwong's active production period spanned approximately 1959 to 1967–68, with the last known production being 母忘我 (1968). No single dramatic event precipitated its closure; rather, the company's decline tracked the broader contraction of the Cantonese film industry, which entered a steep decline from the mid-to-late 1960s. Cantonese-language film production effectively ceased by the early 1970s before its revival later that decade.

Wong had already begun establishing his Taiwan base in 1967 with the founding of First Film Organisation (see § Later career and legacy).

== Films ==
=== Genre and themes ===
Lan Kwong's signature output was the urban satirical comedy (時裝諷刺喜劇) — modern-dress films depicting contemporary Hong Kong life across all social strata. The HKFA described the company's 53 films as "modern satires that touched on all walks of life in the city," citing examples including boarding-school girls in Ten Schoolgirls (十大姐, 1960), grassroots factory workers in Factory Queen (工廠皇后, 1963), modern women navigating urban independence in Two City Girls (都市兩女性, 1963), and the nuclear family in Beware of the Husband (小夫妻, 1964).

Several recurring thematic concerns defined the company's body of work:

Industrialisation and the working woman. Films such as Factory Queen and Queen of the Tea House (點心皇后, 1965) portrayed economically independent women — factory workers, service workers — as positive, resourceful, and socially conscious figures. These characters, typically played by lead actress Ting Ying (丁瑩), represented a new feminine archetype in Cantonese cinema reflecting Hong Kong's rapid industrial transformation.

Class mobility and urbanisation. Many plots explored tensions between old-money families and new working-class aspirants. Landlady and Tenant (阿珍要嫁人, 1966), for example, centred on class-conscious parents opposing their daughter's relationship with a tenant.

Modern marriage and gender dynamics. Moving beyond traditional patriarchal family dramas, Lan Kwong's films examined power struggles within young married couples in "small family" (小康之家) settings. Diary of a Husband (大丈夫日記, 1964), adapted from a popular Commercial Radio serial and directed by Chor Yuen, depicted the lifestyle of white-collar young couples influenced by peers.

Beyond comedy, the company occasionally ventured into other genres, including wuxia serials such as Thirteen Swords (武林十三劍, 1961, in two parts), mystery-thrillers such as The Elevator Murder Case (升降機命案, 1960) and Creepy Nights (鬼夜, 1961), and spy-action films reflecting the global James Bond craze of the mid-1960s.

=== Hong Kong–South Korea co-productions ===
Wong Cheuk-hon was, according to the HKFA, the filmmaker who "pioneered cooperation with the Korean film industry" (開創與韓國影界合作的先河). The Korean Film Archive, in a Google Arts & Culture exhibition curated by Prof. Sangjoon Lee of Lingnan University, described him as "the Hong Kong film producer who led Korean-Chinese collaborations in the 1960s and early 1970s." The 2024 HKFA retrospective dedicated an entire section, titled "Co-production Pioneer" (合拍先鋒), to this aspect of Wong's legacy.

The collaboration began even before Lan Kwong's formal establishment, with Because I Love You (1958), co-produced with Korean filmmaker Lim Hwa-soo and directed by Han Hyung-mo. Under the Lan Kwong banner, the first co-production was the song-and-dance film Love for You (星月爭輝, 1959).

The landmark achievement was The Flaming Mountain (火燄山, 1962), an adaptation of the Journey to the West episode featuring the Bull Demon King and Princess Iron Fan. Co-produced with Korea's Hanyang Film Company (漢陽映畫社), it was co-directed by Mok Hong-si and Korean director Kim Soo-yong (金洙容). The cast blended Hong Kong and Korean talent: Ting Ying as Princess Iron Fan, child star Tsui Siu-ming (徐小明, aged 9) as Red Boy, and Lam Kau as the Bull Demon King from the Hong Kong side, alongside Korean stars Choi Mu-ryong (崔戊龍) and Kim Ji-mi (金芝美). Released in Cantonese, Mandarin, and Korean versions, the 89-minute film became a major commercial hit in South Korea. It was Hong Kong's first Cantonese film shot in Eastmancolor and widescreen (Technirama) format.

The mid-1960s James Bond craze spawned further co-productions in the espionage genre. SOS Hong Kong (1966), directed by Choi Gyeong-ok, placed Ting Ying in a Bond-style spy thriller. The most prestigious collaboration was The International Secret Agents (國際女間諜, 1967), directed by Korean auteur Shin Sang-ok (申相玉). The 78-minute Mandarin-language colour film starred Korean actor Park No-shik as a spy tracking stolen military secrets in Hong Kong, alongside Ting Ying and Li Mei (李湄) — in Li Mei's final screen role. The production featured extensive location shooting across Hong Kong and Kowloon, including Tsim Sha Tsui Wharf, Sai Kung market, and the Jumbo Floating Restaurant. The final major co-production was the large-scale war film The Brave Tanks (神勇坦克隊, 1967–68), directed by Kim Dong-hak.

Academic scholarship on these co-productions has grown in recent years. Prof. Sangjoon Lee published a chapter on SOS Hong Kong in Remapping the Cold War in Asian Cinemas (Amsterdam University Press), analysing how these films reflected Cold War geopolitics in East Asia. Wong's memoir, Film Life: Memoir of Wong Cheuk-hon (電影人生：黃卓漢回憶錄, Wanxiang Books, Taipei, 1994), is cited as a primary source in the scholarly literature, particularly pages 103–105 on the Korean co-productions.

=== Filmography ===
Drawing from the Hong Kong Movie Database (HKMDB, company ID 587), dianying.com, and HKFA publications, the following represents a reconstruction of Lan Kwong's output. Some early titles attributed to Lan Kwong on HKMDB may represent distribution credits or pre-formation productions under Wong's management. The reconstruction identifies approximately 55–58 entries, broadly consistent with the stated 53 once pre-formation distribution credits and potential double-countings are accounted for; dianying.com's database counts 49 records.

Lan Kwong Film Company filmography
Year	Chinese title	English title	Director	Notes
1959	兩個大老襯	Two Simpletons	—	Leung Sing-bor, Sun Ma Sze-tsang, Ko Lo-chuen
1959	星月爭輝	Love for You	—	HK–Korea co-production; song-and-dance film
1960	三女性	Three Females	Mok Hong-si	Lo Yim-hing, Ku Mei, Ting Ying
1960	十大姐	Ten Schoolgirls	Mok Hong-si	Ting Ying
1960	升降機命案	The Elevator Murder Case	—	Paul Chu Kong (early role)
1961	孤雛血淚	Sorrowful Orphans	—	—
1961	母子淚	Mother and Son	—	—
1961	棄婦	Forsaken Daughter	—	—
1961	女人的秘密	A Woman's Secret	Mok Hong-si	Ting Ying
1961	鬼夜	Creepy Nights	—	—
1961	武林十三劍（上集）	Thirteen Swords Part 1	—	—
1961	武林十三劍（下集）	Thirteen Swords Part 2	—	—
1962	雨中蓮	Lotus in the Rain	—	—
1962	夫妻的秘密	Secrets Between Husband and Wife	Mok Hong-si	—
1962	火燄山	The Flaming Mountain	Mok Hong-si; Kim Soo-yong	HK–Korea co-production; first widescreen Eastmancolor Cantonese film
1962	神秘的凶手	The Mysterious Murderer	—	—
1962	離鄉情淚	Sadly Bidding My Hometown	Wong Cheuk-hon	—
1963	金夫人	Madam Kam	Mok Hong-si	Pak Yin, Ting Ying
1963	工廠皇后	Factory Queen	Mok Hong-si	Ting Ying, Cheung Yee, Cheung Ying-choi, Lam Yim
1963	第一號女賊	No. 1 Lady Thief	—	—
1963	都市兩女性	Two City Girls	Mok Hong-si	—
1963	香海情潮	Tides of Passion	Wong Cheuk-hon	—
1963	卿何薄命	Young Girl in Love	—	Lam Ka-sing; period drama
1963	一屍五命案	One Murder, Five Deaths	—	—
1964	冷燕飄零	The Drifting Swallow	Wong Cheuk-hon	Ting Ying
1964	大丈夫日記	Diary of a Husband	Chor Yuen	Ting Ying, Nam Hung, Cheung Ying-choi, Lam Bun; adapted from Commercial Radio serial
1964	小夫妻	Beware of the Husband	—	—
1964	佳兒佳婦	My Excellent Children and Wife	Mok Hong-si	Ting Ying
1964	流浪小天使	Homeless Children	—	—
1964	學生王子	The Student Prince	Mok Hong-si	Alan Tang (debut), Ting Ying; 109 min, B&W
1964	神龍五虎將	—	—	—
1964	密碼間諜戰	—	—	Spy film
1965	女間諜第一號	Female Spy No. 1	Wong Cheuk-hon	Paul Chu Kong; 93 min
1965	女賊金蝴蝶	—	—	Ting Ying
1965	閨房趣史	—	—	Ting Ying
1965	情天劫	—	—	Ting Ying
1965	點心皇后	Queen of the Tea House	Mok Hong-si	Ting Ying
1965	張愛蘭巧破黑手黨	—	—	Ting Ying
1965	追兇記	—	—	Ting Ying
1965	巫山夢斷相思淚	—	Wong Cheuk-hon	Ting Ying, Cheung Ying-choi, Paul Chu Kong
1966	千手奇女子	—	—	—
1966	神秘夫人	—	—	Ting Ying
1966	真假金蝴蝶	—	—	—
1966	樓上樓下兩相親	—	—	Ting Ying
1966	巴士奇遇結良緣	—	—	Ting Ying
1966	白頭情侶	—	Wong Cheuk-hon	Ting Ying, Paul Chu Kong; adapted from radio novel
1966	阿珍要嫁人	Landlady and Tenant	Mok Hong-si	Ting Ying, Paul Chu Kong, Ko Lo-chuen; 107 min
1966	深閨夢裡人	—	Wong Cheuk-hon	Ting Ying, Ka Ling, Cheung Yee, Lam Bun
1966	四姊妹	Four Sisters	Mok Hong-si	Ting Ying; Mok's last Lan Kwong film
1966	小康之家	—	—	Ting Ying
1966	難為了嬌妻	—	—	Ting Ying
1966	SOS Hong Kong	SOS Hong Kong	Choi Gyeong-ok	HK–Korea co-production; Ting Ying
1967	長相憶	Remembrance	—	HK–Korea co-production
1967	國際女間諜	The International Secret Agents	Shin Sang-ok	HK–Korea co-production; 78 min, colour, Mandarin
1967	多少柔情多少淚	—	—	—
1967–68	神勇坦克隊	The Brave Tanks	Kim Dong-hak	HK–Korea co-production; war film
1968	母忘我	—	—	Last known Lan Kwong production

== Key personnel ==
=== Mok Hong-si (director) ===
Mok Hong-si (莫康時, 1908–1969) was the principal creative force behind Lan Kwong's output, described by the HKFA as a "master of comedy" (喜劇聖手). He directed 23 films starring Ting Ying at the company between 1959 and 1966, forming one of the most productive director–actress partnerships of the era.

Mok's directorial style balanced comic exaggeration with social realism, delivering sharp commentary on commercialism and class pretension. He was known for investing attention in supporting characters and subplots, giving "green leaf" (配角) actors rare showcases. In addition to the satirical comedies, Mok created two action-heroine serial series at Lan Kwong — the Girl in the Bus series (1965–66) and the Lady Bond series (1966–67) — featuring proletarian heroines who worked as factory employees and were trained in martial arts.

The HKFA's "Writer/Director in Focus III: Mok Hong-si" programme (2016) and the accompanying HKFA Newsletter No. 77 (August 2016) provided extensive scholarly analysis of Mok's Lan Kwong tenure.

=== Ting Ying (lead actress) ===
Ting Ying (丁瑩, born 1938, real name Ji Jingyu 季景鈺) was Lan Kwong's sole contracted female lead (當家花旦, the studio's marquee actress), appearing in the vast majority of its productions. Wong had discovered her at the age of 15, circa 1952, while she was a student at St. Clare's Girls' School. She initially trained for Mandarin films at Liberty alongside Jeanette Lin Tsui, with the pair being dubbed Liberty's "twin treasures" (孖寶). When Wong pivoted to Cantonese production, Ting Ying became the face of the new company.

The HKFA's Mok Hong-si retrospective essay noted: "Ting Ying can be said to have been single-handedly shaped by [Mok] into a new-generation star… her multi-faceted image compensated for slightly unpolished acting. That Ting Ying became Lan Kwong's sole leading lady and a hugely popular star was largely thanks to Mok Hong-si." When Wong established First Film Organisation in Taiwan in 1967, Ting Ying followed to make Mandarin films before retiring after 人鬼狐 (1969) and emigrating to Toronto.

=== Notable talent discoveries ===
Wong operated a formal actor training programme at Lan Kwong beginning in 1959, and was known as a "ten-cap all-rounder" (十頂全能) for his ability to handle producing, screenwriting, directing, cinematography, and editing.

Paul Chu Kong (朱江, born 1941, real name Zhu Shidong 朱士東) auditioned in late 1959, received four months of drama training, and debuted before landing a lead role in The Elevator Murder Case (1960). His co-trainees included Cheung Yee (張儀), Fong Ting-ting (方婷婷), and Lee Hak (李克). Paul Chu Kong became Lan Kwong's leading man, frequently paired with Ting Ying as a popular screen couple. He later joined TVB in 1969 and became a leading television actor, appearing in John Woo's The Killer (1989).

Helena Law Lan (羅蘭, born 1934, née Lo Yin-ying 盧燕英) was discovered by Wong in 1960 at the age of 26. Of mixed Chinese-Indian heritage, she had worked as a film extra since childhood. Wong signed her as a contract actress and gave her the stage name "Lo Lan" because it evoked the sophistication of a Shanghai socialite — fitting for the villain roles he envisioned. At Lan Kwong, she specialised in antagonistic characters: wicked wives, shrews, and dance-hall girls. She later became one of Hong Kong cinema's most recognisable character actresses, winning Best Actress at the 19th Hong Kong Film Awards (2000) for Beware, becoming the oldest actress to receive that honour at that time.

Alan Tang (鄧光榮, 1946–2011) was the company's most celebrated discovery. In 1963, Lan Kwong announced an open audition for The Student Prince (學生王子). Tang, then a 17-year-old student at New Method College (新法書院), was reportedly signed up by classmates as a prank. Selected from over a thousand applicants, he starred in the 1964 film directed by Mok Hong-si, which launched his career and earned him the lifelong nickname "Student Prince." Tang became a major romantic lead in 1960s–70s Hong Kong and Taiwan cinema, later founding D&B Films and — crucially — discovering and financing Wong Kar-wai, producing As Tears Go By (1988) and Days of Being Wild (1990).

=== Other notable performers ===
Pak Yin (白燕, 1920–1987), the revered "Queen of South China Cinema," appeared in at least one Lan Kwong production, Madam Kam (金夫人, 1963), directed by Mok Hong-si, in which she played a middle-aged former courtesan — a departure from her typical virtuous-woman typecasting.

Radio personality Lam Bun (林彬, 1929–1967) appeared in Diary of a Husband (1964). Lam Bun was murdered on 24 August 1967, firebombed while driving to work at Commercial Radio after publicly condemning leftist violence during the 1967 Hong Kong riots.

== Later career and legacy ==
=== Wong Cheuk-hon's subsequent ventures ===
In 1967, Wong founded First Film Organisation Limited (第一影業機構有限公司), registered in Hong Kong but with its production base in Taiwan. First Film's debut, Crazy Swordsman (大瘋俠, 1968), written and directed by Wong, helped establish the martial arts film trend in Taiwan. The company grew to become the fourth-largest film organisation in the Hong Kong–Taiwan region, recruiting major stars including Jimmy Wang Yu, Chen Sing, Polly Shang-kuan Ling-feng, and Japanese martial artist Kurata Yasuaki.

Notable First Film productions spanned martial arts (Furious Slaughter, 1972), literary romance (Fantasies Behind the Pearly Curtain, 1975), the King Hu wuxia classic Legend of the Mountain (1979), and Stanley Kwan's Red Rose White Rose (1994), which received a Berlin Film Festival nomination.

Wong also founded Hanhua Film Company (漢華影業社, 1981) for Western film distribution in Taiwan, operated the Guodu Theatre (國都戲院) and Huasheng Theatre (華聲戲院) in Taipei, and ran Chinese-language cinemas in six cities across the United States and Canada during the 1970s and 1980s. He received the Lifetime Achievement Award at the 30th Golden Horse Awards in 1993. Wong died in Hong Kong on 8 October 2004.

=== Preservation and scholarship ===
First Film Organisation Limited donated the corpus of films from Wong's three production companies to the Hong Kong Film Archive — over 200 films plus more than 10,000 items of posters, production stills, newspaper clippings, and related materials. This donation, highlighted in the HKFA's 20th-anniversary "Acquisition Diary: 20 Milestones in 20 Years," represents one of the most significant single donations in the Archive's history.

The HKFA mounted a major retrospective from 2 August to 25 October 2024, titled "Morning Matinee: Cinematic Dreams of Wong Cheuk-hon" (影畫早晨──黃卓漢的影夢人生), screening 16 films across six thematic sections, with some titles presented in 2K digital format. The six sections were: "Lan Kwong Comedies," "The Joys and Sorrows of Ting Ying," "Co-production Pioneer," "Discovering New Stars," "Selection from First Films," and "Distribution Classics." Post-screening talks featured scholars and practitioners including Tsui Siu-ming, Shu Kei, and Ng Chun-hung.

Several HKFA publications contain substantial scholarly analysis of Lan Kwong. The Oral History Series (5): An Emerging Modernity: Hong Kong Cinema of the 1960s (2008, edited by Kwok Ching-ling, 356 pages) contains extended oral history interviews with Wong Cheuk-hon covering the founding of Lan Kwong and his filmmaking philosophy, as well as an interview with Helena Law Lan specifically about the company's production methods. Wong's memoir, Film Life: Memoir of Wong Cheuk-hon (電影人生：黃卓漢回憶錄), published by Wanxiang Books (Taipei, 1994), is cited as a primary source in the academic literature.

The rights-holding entity Hong Kong First Distribution Co. Ltd. (香港第一發行有限公司) continued to exist as of 2024.

== See also ==
- Wong Cheuk-hon
- Hong Kong Film Archive
- Cantonese cinema
- Cinema of Hong Kong
- Shaw Brothers Studio
- Kong Ngee Company
- Alan Tang
- Helena Law Lan
- Paul Chu Kong
- Shin Sang-ok
- Chor Yuen
- Wong Kar-wai
- 1967 Hong Kong riots
- D&B Films
