= HKFA =

HKFA may refer to:

- Hong Kong Film Award, an annual film awards ceremony in Hong Kong
- Hong Kong Film Archive, located at 50 Lei King Road, Sai Wan Ho, Hong Kong
- Hong Kong Football Association, the association football federation of Hong Kong, China
