= Black Rose II =

1997 Hong Kong film by Jeffrey Lau and Corey Yuen

- Film poster

Chinese name
- Traditional Chinese: 黑玫瑰義結金蘭
Transcriptions
- Directed by: Jeffrey Lau; Corey Yuen
- Written by: Jeffrey Lau (as Ann Gee)
- Produced by: Kristie Leung Sam Choi Man; Jeffrey Lau
- Starring: Nancy Sit
- Cinematography: Fung Yuen Man
- Edited by: Kai Kit-Wai
- Music by: Lowell Lo
- Production company: Cinemagic
- Distributed by: Golden Harvest
- Release date: 1 March 1997
- Running time: 92 minutes
- Country: Hong Kong
- Languages: Cantonese; Mandarin
- Box office: HK $3,363,913

Black Rose II (Cantonese: 黑玫瑰義結金蘭), also known as 97 Legendary La Rose Noire, is a 1997 Hong Kong comedy film co-directed by Jeffrey Lau and Corey Yuen with action choreography by Yuen Tak. Lau wrote the screenplay under the pseudonym "Ann Gee". The film is a sequel to Lau's 1992 film 92 Legendary La Rose Noire but features a new storyline and no returning cast members. All of the films are ultimately inspired by Chor Yuen's 1965 film The Black Rose and its sequels. Chor Yuen's wife Hung Nam, who played Chan Mei-Ling in the original film The Black Rose (1965) and its sequel Spy with My Face (1966), has a cameo in the film as one of Black Rose's disguises. Donnie Yen, who would go on to co-direct the next Black Rose film Protégé de la Rose Noire, has a small role as a boxing school owner.

== Plot ==
Chi-Mo works at a small restaurant for his pre-operative transsexual boss who is transitioning to female. He regularly delivers food to the home of an unknown occupant who leaves the money on the lamp outside her door. One day he delivers food to the Swan Lake dance school, where he sees that Yan-Yan, the girl of his dreams, has broken her shoelace so he gives her the string that holds up his pants. He signs up for lessons but the school closes and Yan-Yan is attacked by a gang. Chi-Mo rushes to save her but she fights off her attackers on her own then departs. When they next meet, Yan-Yan is kidnapped by Sandra, a vicious loan shark leading the gang.

Overhearing his troubles, the woman to whom he regularly delivers food invites him inside, changing disguises from Yan-Yan to Hung Nam and finally revealing herself as the legendary Black Rose, a Robin Hood-like figure who helps the people of Hong Kong. She then locks him in a room with Lui Kei, whom she has kept locked up for 30 years out of jealousy while she pretended to be dead so that her students Piu-hung and Yum-fan would not find him. In order to defeat Black Rose, Lui Kei teaches Chi-Mo kung fu by making him perform all of the housework. Chi-Mo's co-worker Dan, who is also a pre-operative male-to-female transsexual, ends up trapped in the house as well.

Black Rose eventually decides that she will work with Lui Kei to rescue Yan-Yan and they fight Sandra and her gang with a variety of unusual gadgets. Black Rose feels the effects of her asthma and they are forced to flee, ending up on stage in a club where they must perform a musical number. Lui Kei tells Black Rose that he now realises that she has loved him all this time and that is why she kept him away from Piu-hung and Yum-fan. He promises to be her companion and they escape together with Yan-Yan.

Back at Black Rose's home they throw Yan-Yan into the dungeon with Chi-Mo while Lui Kei nurses Black Rose back to health. The two decide to get married so Black Rose releases her prisoners Yan-Yan, Chi-Mo and Dan, but at that moment Sandra's gang attacks. The traps in Black Rose's home occupy Sandra's gang and Chi-Mo and Yan-Yan accidentally kiss and embrace their feelings for each other. Sandra reveals to Black Rose that she is Suen May-tong, daughter of Black Rose's sworn enemy Suen Big-ling, wielder of the Invincible Flying Rings. Black Rose uses her Rose Sword and fights Suen May-tong.

When it seems that Black Rose has been defeated, Suen May-tong takes a machine gun and kills the members of her gang. She then removes her mask and reveals that she is Black Rose and that she already defeated Suen May-tong earlier. She says that Chi-Mo, Yan-Yan and Dan have realised what love and friendship are and she wishes them happiness forever before vanishing with Lui Kei. Dan is revealed to have found love with a new boyfriend at the end of the film.

== Cast ==
- Nancy Sit as Black Rose
- Sandra Ng as Sandra Suen
- Jan Lamb as Hui Chi-Mo
- Spencer Lam as Lui Kei
- Desiree Lam as Yan-Yan
- Blackie Ko as Dan
- Kwok-Kit Lam
- Kin-Yan Lee
- Lowell Lo
- Hung Nam as herself/Black Rose (cameo)
- Donnie Yen as Boxing School Owner
- Bobby Yip as Loan Shark

== Reception ==
Reviewer Wendy Schadewald of shortredheadreelreviews.com gives the film 2.5 out of 5 stars, calling it a "wacky, pratfall comedy".

In his book The Hong Kong Filmography 1977–1997: A Reference Guide to Films Produced by British Hong Kong Studios, author John Charles writes, "The law of diminishing returns is certainly in evidence with this follow-up to 92 Legendary La Rose Noire and Rose Rose I Love You. The least of the three films, it is comprised of especially stale slapstick and more in-joke references that will mean little to those who lack a knowledge of 1960s HK entertainment. [...] The most imaginative and amusing aspect of the film is the opening credit sequence, which is presented in a most offbeat and enjoyable manner. However, Tony Leung Kar-fai's goofy Lui Kei caricature is sorely missed, and the various send-ups (including the Japanese hit Shall We Dance?) are less than inspired. A handful of chuckles emerge (thanks mainly to Black Rose's inept weapons, like 'Killer Lipstick' and a lethal electrified pen that has to be plugged in to work) but not nearly enough to justify a viewing."
