= Alan Schechter (film producer) =

American film producer

- Born: Louis Alan Schechter; August 4, 1965; Cleveland, Ohio, U.S.
- Died: August 14, 2005 (aged 40); Los Angeles, California, U.S.
- Other name: Louis Schechter
- Occupations: Film and television producer and film writer

Alan Schechter (1965–2005) was an American action movie producer best known for his trademark style of "Low budget films with big budget effects."

== Personal life ==
Born in 1965 and raised in Cleveland to Lori and Morris Paul Schechter, Schechter graduated from Shaker Heights High School in 1983. Alan's family was already in the media biz as his father Morris Schechter was a local radio personality in Cleveland in the 1950s and was known as the "Voice of Racing" because he broadcast local horse races. Morris Paul Schechter later changed his name to Van Lane in 1950 after the radio station he was working for had a "Name the DJ" contest.

Schechter's mother died in a traffic accident when he was only 8 years old.

He began training as a survivalist in high school with the Posse Comitatus and kept his apartment full of emergency supplies including MREs, ammunition, tools, and even suture kits.

Schechter died at his home in Los Angeles on August 14, 2005, from a self-inflicted gunshot wound.

== Education ==
He applied and accepted to California Institute of the Arts.

== Career ==
During high school, he worked at Viacom's Public-access television cable TV channel in Cleveland organizing a live call-in show there for the Shaker Schools' levy campaign. Alan started working in films in the late 1980s as a production assistant at Cannon Films.

His trademark quickly became low-budget films with big budget effects.

Alan began working as the personal assistant to mega producer, Joel Silver and Silver Films in 1991. He rose through the ranks and was involved in the production as an associate producer, producer or co-producer for such films as Fair Game, Double Tap, Renegade Force, Made Men, Proximity, Jane Doe and the TV series Next Action Star.

== Filmography ==
- Proximity (2001) (producer)
- Made Men (1999) (co-producer)
- Renegade Force (1998) (writer/producer)
- Double Tap (1997) (co-producer)
- Fair Game (1995) (associate producer)
- Double Dragon (1994) (producer)
- Showdown (1993) (producer)
- The Last Boy Scout (1991) (assistant: Joel Silver)
- Ricochet (1991) (assistant: Michael Levy)

== Television ==
- Bet Your Life (2004)
- Next Action Star (2004) TV series (producer: Cinema Action Unit)
- Jane Doe (2001)

== Actor ==
- "Next Action Star" (2004) TV series .... Judge (Casting Special)
