= Fung Bo-bo =

Hong Kong actor

- Chinese: 馮寶寶
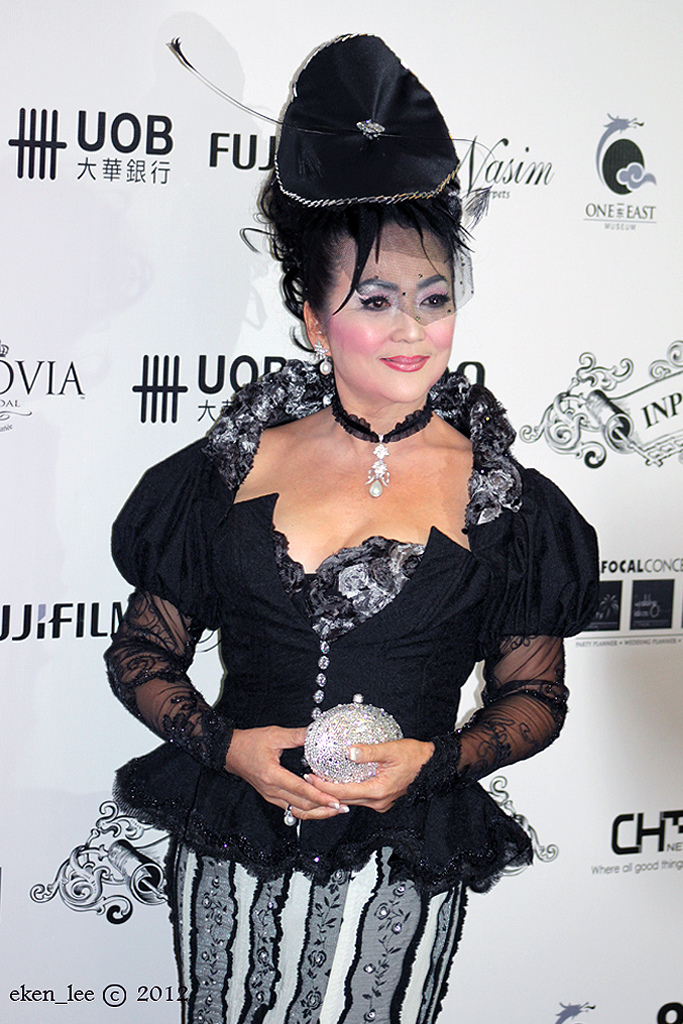
- Fung in 2012
- Born: 30 October 1954 (age 71); Sandakan, Malaysia
- Other names: Petrina Fung, Petrina Fung Bo Bo, BOBO, Bo-bo Fung
- Occupation: Actress
- Years active: 1959–present
- Known for: Shirley Temple of Hong Kong
- Parents: Fung Fung (father); Chan Wai Yu (mother)
- Awards: Hong Kong Film Awards – Best Supporting Actress; 1993 92 Legendary La Rose Noire; 1994 C'est la vie, mon chéri

Petrina Fung Bo Bo (born 30 October 1954) is a Malaysian-born Hong Kong actress. She is best known as one of the most popular child actresses of Hong Kong cinema in the 1960s, for which she received the nickname "Shirley Temple of Hong Kong". In the 1990s, she managed a successful acting comeback, appearing in several hit Hong Kong movies and winning 2 consecutive Hong Kong Film Awards for Best Supporting Actress for the films 92 Legendary La Rose Noire and C'est la vie, mon chéri.

== Early life ==
On 30 October 1954, Fung was born in British North Borneo (now part of Malaysia). Her father was Fung Fung, an actor and Fung's brother was Fung Hak-On, who was an actor too. At age 12, Fung lived with Madam Wee Poh Keok, whom she called "kai leong", or godmother. Fung also learned to speak the Hokkien dialect from her godmother. Fung's education consists of private tutors. At age 16, Fung flew to England to study.

== Career ==
Fung started her career as a child actress. In 1956, at age 2 and a half, Fung debuted in Love vs Love (aka Little Sweetheart), written and directed by her father. By age 14, Fung had made more than 300 films, and was a noted stage performer across most of South East Asia. Fung was known as the Shirley Temple of Hong Kong and Chinese Canto Region.

She then went to study in the United Kingdom, during which she met her future first husband, Chiu Joi Keung, who worked in finance.

In 1976, Fung worked with Eddie Lau, a fashion designer in Hong Kong.

In Hong Kong, director Clifton Ko offered Fung the leading role in Wonder Mama, a television drama film.

During the 1980s she starred in a series of historical television period dramas, including playing China's lone female emperor, Wu Zetian. She made her film comeback in 1986 in the comedy My Family, also written by and associated produced by Clifton Ko.

In 1994, Fung retired from acting. Fung occasionally made special appearances in some films.

== Filmography ==
=== Films ===
| Year | Title | Role | Notes/Ref. |
|---|---|---|---|
| 1956 | Love vs Love (aka Little Sweetheart) Chinese: 小冤家 | Child eating cake | Written and directed by her father. |
| 1960 | Blooming under a Cool Moon | | |
| 1960 | The Great Devotion | | |
| 1960 | The Little Warrior in Red Butterfly | | |
| 1960 | The Orphan Saved Her Adoptive Mother | | |
| 1960 | The Simpletion and the Thief | | |
| 1960 | The Stormy Night | | |
| 1960 | Traitrous Queen | | |
| 1960 | An Uncle's Sacrifice | | |
| 1961 | Beggar King Saves The Prince | | |
| 1961 | Chase | | |
| 1961 | Little Cosmonaut | | |
| 1961 | Little Go-Between | | |
| 1961 | The Little Go-Between | | |
| 1961 | Little Matchmakers | | |
| 1961 | Little Orphan | | |
| 1961 | Little Prime Minister | | |
| 1961 | The Little Warrior in Red Butterfly | | |
| 1961 | Little White Golden Dragon | | |
| 1961 | Lucky Child Granted By Heaven | | |
| 1961 | Magic Cave | | |
| 1961 | Magic Cup | | |
| 1961 | One Who Saved All | | |
| 1961 | The Orphan's Adventure | | |
| 1961 | Shadow of a Doubt | | |
| 1961 | Sorrowful Orphans | | |
| 1961 | Valuable False Daughter | | |
| 1961 | Wonder Boy | | |
| 1962 | The Chase | | |
| 1962 | The Drifting Orphan | | |
| 1962 | Little Artists | | |
| 1962 | The Magic Cup | | |
| 1962 | My Little Lucky Star | | |
| 1962 | Puppet Princess | | |
| 1962 | Sad Tale of Two Women | | |
| 1962 | Scarlet Boy | | |
| 1962 | Little Twin Actresses | | Played 6 different roles. |
| 1963 | Little Dragon Girl Teases White Snake Spirit | | |
| 1963 | The Purple Cup | | |
| 1964 | My Darling Grandchild | | |
| 1965 | The Invincible Kid Fang Shiyu | | |
| 1965 | Moonlight | | |
| 1965 | Pink Tears | | |
| 1965 | The Skeleton Tower Under the Sea | | |
| 1965 | Temple of the Red Lotus | | |
| 1965 | The Twin Swords | | |
| 1967 | The Horrifying Adventure of a Girl | | |
| 1967 | The Sword and the Lute | | |
| 1970 | The Lonely Rider (aka The Gallant Boy) | Producer | |
| 2010 | All About Love | | |
| 2009 | All's Well, Ends Well 2009 | | |
| 1999 | Afraid of Nothing, The Jobless King | | |
| 1995 | Fake Emperor | | |
| 1995 | Mother of a Different Kind | | Nominated – Hong Kong Film Award for Best Actress |
| 1994 | I Wanna Be Your Man! | | |
| 1994 | It's a Wonderful Life | | |
| 1994 | Right Here Waiting... | | |
| 1994 | I Have a Date with Spring | | |
| 1993 | C'est la vie, mon chéri | | Won – Hong Kong Film Award for Best Supporting Actress |
| 1993 | Even Mountains Meet | | |
| 1993 | Yesteryou, Yesterme, Yesterday | | |
| 1992 | 92 Legendary La Rose Noire | | Won – Hong Kong Film Award for Best Supporting Actress |
| 1992 | Cash on Delivery | | |
| 1992 | Girls Without Tomorrow 1992 | | |
| 1990 | Goodbye Hero | | |
| 1990 | Hong Kong Gigolo | | |
| 1989 | Beyond the Sunset | | Nominated – Hong Kong Film Award for Best Actress |
| 1988 | The Eighth Happiness | | |
| 1988 | Girls Without Tomorrow | | |
| 1988 | Miss Magic | | |
| 1988 | Women's Prison | | |
| 1986 | My Family | | |
| 1984 | Empress Wu | | |
| 2015 | Wonder Mama | | |
| 1975 | The Floating Clouds | | |
| 1973 | China Behind | | |
| 1971 | Mighty Couple | | |
| 1970 | The Crazy Bar | | |
| 1970 | The Happy Angel | | |
| 1970 | The Lonely Rider | | |
| 1970 | Modern School Life | | |
| 1970 | To Crack the Dragon Gate | | |
| 1969 | The Devil Warrior | | |
| 1969 | Four Darling Daughters | | |
| 1969 | Let's Sing And Dance to Celebrate A Peaceful Year | | |
| 1969 | The Little Warrior | | |
| 1969 | Silver Knife, Scarlet Blade | | |
| 1969 | Sky Dragon Castle | | |
| 1969 | Three Encounters | | |
| 1968 | The Feats of Feng Shiyu | | |
| 1968 | Nu Zha's Adventure in the Eastern Sea | | |
| 1968 | The White Dragon | | |

== Awards ==
- Star on Avenue of the Stars. Hong, Kong.

== Personal life ==
Fung's first husband was Chiu Joi Keung. They have two sons. In 1997, Fung married Yoong Siew Chuen, a Malaysian architect, and moved to Penang Island, Malaysia. In 2012, Fung divorced Yoong Siew Chuen and moved to Hong Kong.

Awards and achievements
| Preceded by Deannie Yip for Dances with the Dragon | Hong Kong Film Award for Best Supporting Actress; 1993 for 92 Legendary La Rose Noire | Succeeded by Fung Bo-bo for C'est la vie, mon chéri |
| Preceded by Fung Bo-bo for 92 Legendary La Rose Noire | Hong Kong Film Award for Best Supporting Actress; 1994 for C'est la vie, mon chéri | Succeeded by Law Koon-Lan for I Have a Date with Spring |
