= Chris Yen =

American actress (born 1974)

- 甄子菁
- Born: Yen Tze-ching; 4 August 1974 (age 52); British Hong Kong
- Other name: Chris Yen Chi Ching
- Education: Boston University
- Occupations: Martial artist; actress
- Years active: 1986–2009
- Known for: younger sister of Donnie Yen
- Spouse: Hubert Young (m. 2009)
- Parents: Klyster Yen (father); Bow-sim Mark (mother)
- Family: Donnie Yen (brother)
- Martial arts career
- Style: Tai chi Changquan; Krav Maga; Boxing; Jujutsu
- Teacher: Bow-sim Mark

Chinese name
- Traditional Chinese: 甄子菁
- Simplified Chinese: 甄子菁
Transcriptions
Standard Mandarin
- Hanyu Pinyin: Zhēn Zijīng
Yue: Cantonese
- Jyutping: Jan^{1} Zi^{2} Cing^{1}
- Website: chris.donnieyen.org

Chris Yen Tze-ching (born 4 August 1974) is a Hong Kong-American martial artist and actress. She is the younger sister of the actor Donnie Yen. She was noted for her roles in the films Protégé de la Rose Noire, Adventures of Johnny Tao: Rock Around the Dragon, and Give 'Em Hell, Malone.

== Background ==
Chris Yen
Medal record

Women's wushu taolu

Representing United States

World Championships (pre-IWUF)
| Bronze medal – third place | 1985 Xi'an | Changquan |

Yen was born in Hong Kong on 4 August 1974 to the newspaper editor father Klyster Yen (甄雲龍) and the well-known martial artist mother Bow-sim Mark (麥寶嬋). Both of her parents were also musicians. Her older brother is Donnie Yen (甄子丹). Her family emigrated to Brighton, Massachusetts in 1975.

She was trained in martial arts by her mother at the age of 4 and learned piano at the age of 5.

As the age of 10, being the youngest martial artist, Yen won a silver medal at the 1st International Tai Chi Tournament in 1984. In 1985 as a member of the US National Wushu Team, she competed at the First International Wushu Invitational Tournament in Xi'an from 22 to 28 August, and won a bronze medal in the Women's Changquan competition.

Yen graduated from Boston University with a double major in psychology and business management.

== Personal life ==
Yen was married to Hong Kong-born American professional race car driver and accountant Hubert Young on March 28, 2009, and they kept two rescue dogs, Rex and Yogi.

She left acting to create a fashion brand. Eight years later, she entered the field of property investment. Yen splits her time between Los Angeles, where she lives with her husband, and Boston, where her parents live.

== Filmography ==
=== Films ===
| Year | Title | Role | Non-acting role | Note |
|---|---|---|---|---|
| 1986 | The Close Encounter of the Vampire (僵尸怕怕) | | | |
| 2003 | Shanghai Knights | | Assistant to Donnie Yen | |
| 2004 | Protégé de la Rose Noire (見習黑玫瑰) | Enchantress | | |
| 2007 | Adventures of Johnny Tao: Rock Around the Dragon | Mika | | |
| 2008 | A Good Day to Be Black and Sexy | Jennie | | |
| 2009 | Give 'Em Hell, Malone | "Mauler" | | |

=== Television dramas ===
| Year | Title | Role | Network | Note |
|---|---|---|---|---|
| 2009 | The Forgotten | | NBC | |
| 2009 | Rockville, CA | Annie | The WB 100+ Station Group | |

=== Music video appearances ===
| Year | Song | Artist | Role | Notes |
|---|---|---|---|---|
| 2008 | Double Blade (雙刀) | Jay Chou | Stunt coordinator | |

=== Video games ===
| Year | Video game | Developer | Role | Notes |
|---|---|---|---|---|
| 2008 | Onimusha 3: Demon Siege | Capcom | Assistant to Donnie Yen | Motion capture department |
