= Mother of a Different Kind =

1995 Hong Kong film by David Chiang

Mother of a Different Kind 不一樣的媽媽
- Directed by: David Chiang
- Produced by: Laura Fu
- Release date: 1995
- Running time: 98 minutes
- Country: Hong Kong
- Language: Cantonese
- Box office: HKD 2,505,963 (Hong Kong)

Mother of a Different Kind (不一樣的媽媽) is a 1995 Hong Kong film directed by David Chiang.

== Cast and roles ==
- Lau Ching Wan – Supt Cheung Hung
- Fung Bo Bo – Nurse Lam Sau Mei
- Veronica Yip – Jojo
- Annabelle Lau – Mable, WPC10188
- Michael Tong – Shun, PC10249
- Tam Suk Mooi – Pui
- Tang Chi Lin
- Joe Cheung
- Man Sing
- Ma Suk Jan
