= Kenn Scott (actor) =

American actor (born 1967)

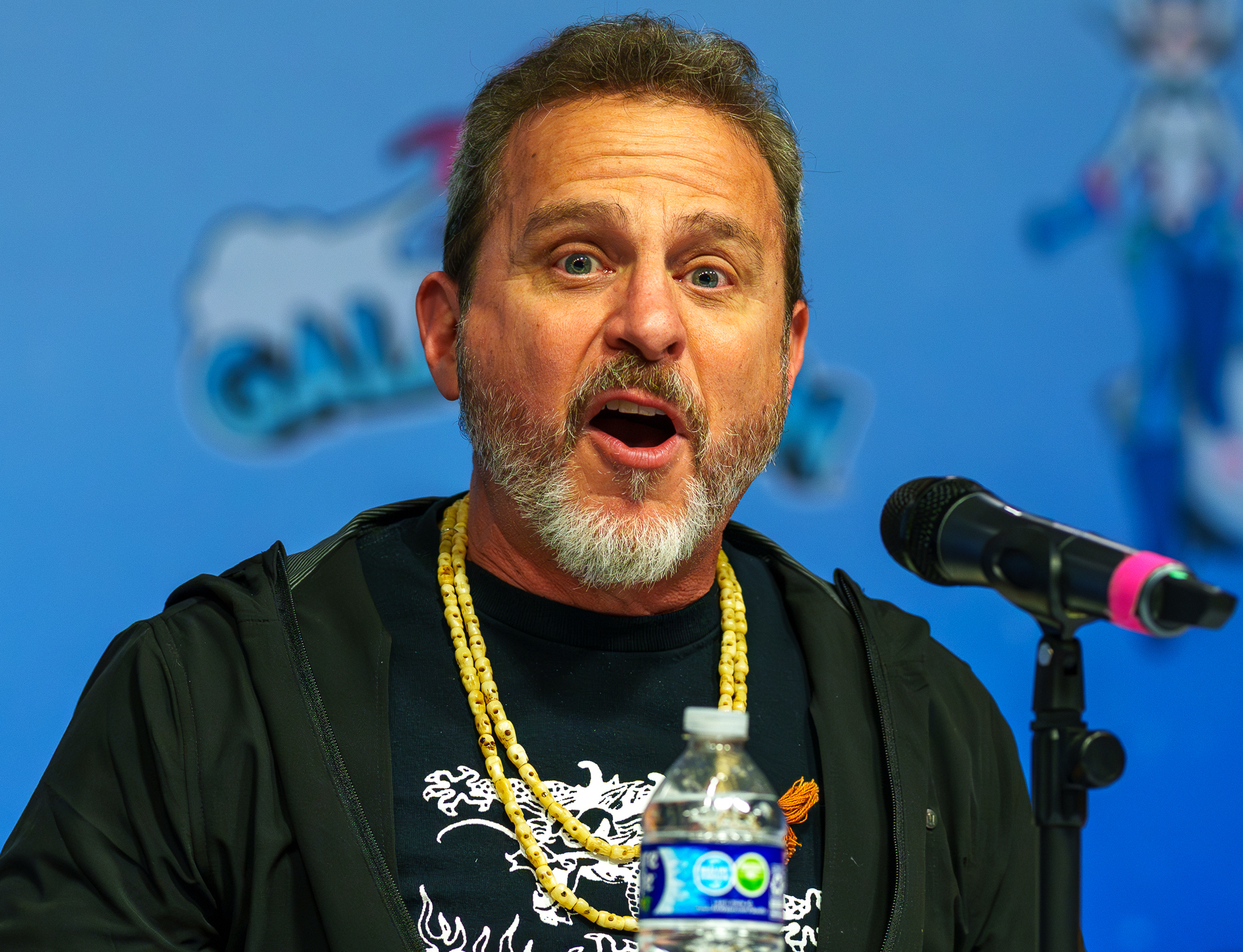
- Scott in 2025
- Born: May 3, 1967 (age 59); New York City, U.S.
- Occupations: Actor; puppeteer; filmmaker; stuntman; martial artist
- Years active: 1990–present
- Website: kennscottauthor.com

Kenn Troum (born May 3, 1967), known as Kenn Scott, is an American actor, puppeteer, filmmaker, former stuntman and martial artist.

== Early life and career ==
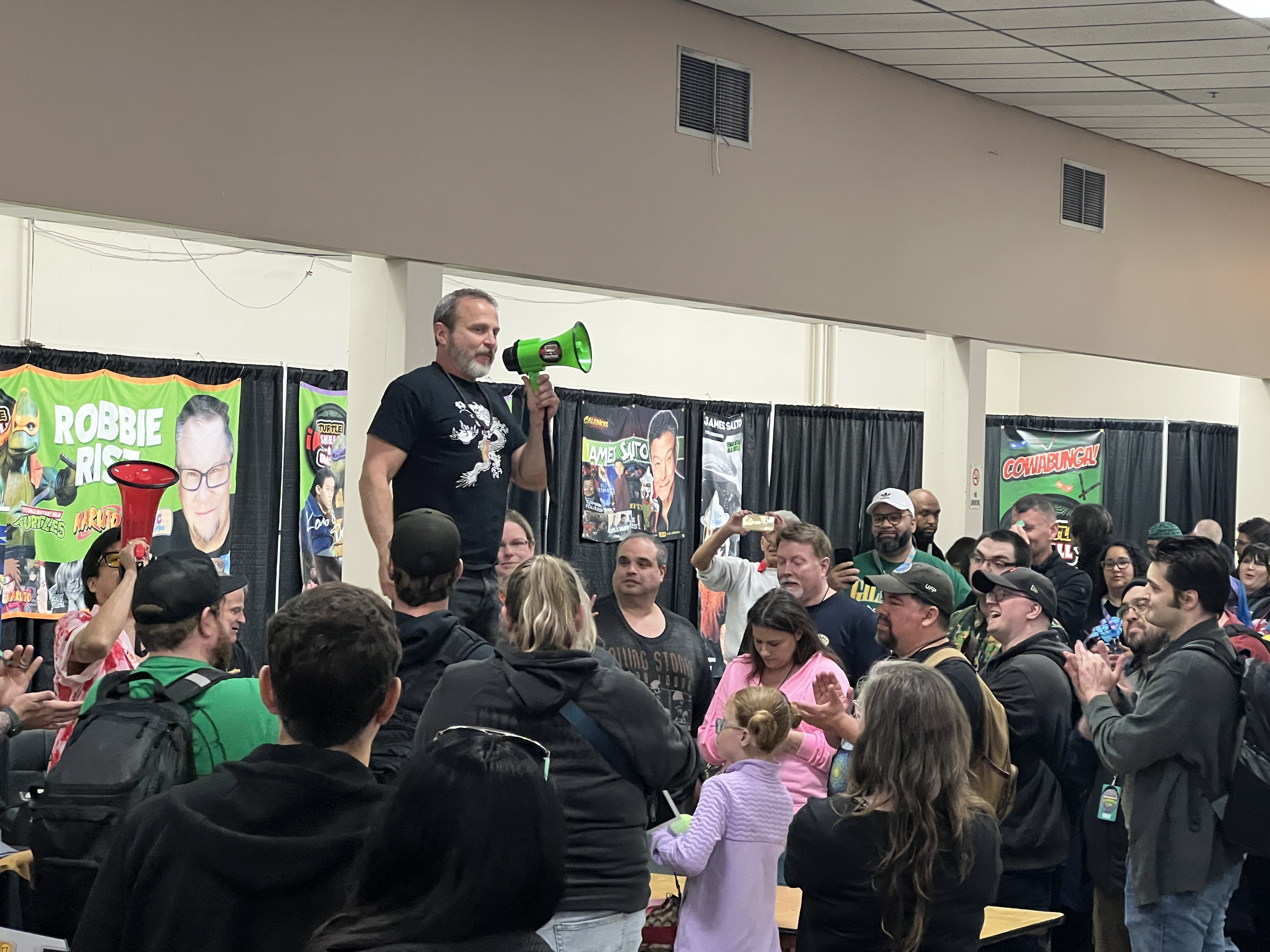
Ken Scott stands on a table and calls out to fans at a convention in Washington state on June 20, 2025.

Scott was born May 3, 1967, in New York City and presently lives in Fort Worth, Texas.

A martial artist and former stuntman, he is most well known as an actor. His most noteworthy credit is his portrayal of Raphael in the hit films Teenage Mutant Ninja Turtles (as a stunt performer) and Teenage Mutant Ninja Turtles II: The Secret of the Ooze (as the suit performer), under his real name Kenn Troum.

He subsequently changed his stage name to Kenn Scott, and broadened his experience to working in action cinema both in front of and behind the camera. As Scott, he had starring roles in the direct-to-video action-adventure films Showdown, Star Hunter, and Sworn To Justice, and received national press attention for his directorial debut, the short, martial-arts comedy Better Never Than Late as well as the action film, Adventures of Johnny Tao: Rock Around the Dragon.

In 2019, he wrote a book called Teenage Ninja to Mutant Turtle: Becoming the Reel Raphael.

He has been a creative director at Avadel, a Texas-based digital advertising agency. Scott earned a master's degree from Tarleton State University and won the Fort Worth Business Plan Competition with a child enrichment video used by Fort Worth Public Library.
