= Protégé de la Rose Noire =

2004 Hong Kong film by Wong Chun-chun and Donnie Yen

- Film poster
- Traditional Chinese: 黑玫瑰義結金蘭
- Directed by: Wong Chun-chun; Donnie Yen
- Written by: Wai-Lun Lam; Roy Szeto; Lau Man Wai
- Produced by: Carl Chang; Shing Sheung Cheung
- Starring: Gillian Chung; Charlene Choi; Ekin Cheng; Teresa Mo
- Cinematography: Man Po Cheung
- Edited by: Wenders Li
- Music by: Ken Chan; Kwong Wing Chan
- Production companies: 1618 Action Limited; Universe Entertainment
- Distributed by: Universe Films Distribution Company
- Release date: 3 February 2004
- Running time: 91 minutes
- Country: Hong Kong
- Language: Cantonese
- Box office: $1,299,743

Protégé de la Rose Noire (Cantonese: 見習黑玫瑰), also known as Black Rose Academy, is a 2004 Hong Kong action comedy film co-directed by Wong Chun-chun and Donnie Yen. It follows Jeffrey Lau's 1997 film Black Rose II as the last in a series of updated Black Rose films but features a different plot and no returning cast members. All of these films are ultimately inspired by Yuen Chor's 1965 film Black Rose and its sequels. The film was a vehicle for the Cantopop duo Twins, who had previously starred in the 2003 vampire film The Twins Effect that was also co-directed by Donnie Yen. Co-director Donnie Yen, who also functioned as action director, had previously played a small role in Black Rose II as a boxing school owner. Donnie Yen's sister Chris Yen plays the role of Enchantress, a gang member in a schoolgirl uniform.

== Plot ==
Gillian Lu is a brilliant student who has just obtained her Psychology degree. Charlene, who believes that she is an alien, is kicked out of a home for expectant mothers because she is not pregnant. Gillian returns to her childhood apartment but finds it being rented out at a price she cannot afford. There she meets Charlene and the two girls quickly become friends.

After seeing an ad seeking a female apprentice, they ride to the address in a taxi driven by Jim Lo, whom they call "J. Lo". In the house they are strung up by nooses that only allow one of them to breathe at a time and by working together they prove their courage and righteousness to Black Rose, who says that she will train them as her successors. The girls call Jim Lo to help them escape from Rose Manor but by the time he digs his way into the building they have come to enjoy the comforts there and no longer wish to leave. They throw him in the bathtub but when he attempts to change his clothes he only finds women's fashion options apart from a suit for the DC Comics character Robin. Black Rose believes that her husband Jackie has returned and welcomes him back but also admonishes him for leaving her years earlier.

At a nearby restaurant the four heroes are attacked by Ms LavenCan and her gang LavenCamp but they fight off their enemies. Some time later they rescue a wealthy man whom the gang is attempting to kidnap and fight with the gang again. The girls eventually ultimately defeat the gang and Black Rose tells them that they will represent the virtues of the Rose from now on while she leaves to seek out Jackie.

A collection of bloopers and outtakes runs during the closing credits.

== Cast ==
- Gillian Chung as Gillian Lu
- Charlene Choi as Charlene
- Ekin Cheng as Jim Lo
- Teresa Mo as Black Rose
- Shiu Hung Hui as Lee Shou-Fu
- Faith Woo as Poison Ivy
- Chris Yen as Enchantress
- Tats Lau
- Meng Lo
- GC Goo-Bi
- Anika Jennie Ji as Poison Ivy
- Mandy Lam Suk Man as Ms Wisteria's gang member
- Chi-Kong Lee
- Hoi-Pang Lo
- Patrick Tang

== Reception ==
In their book Historical Dictionary of Hong Kong Cinema, authors Lisa Odham Stokes and Rachel Braaten write, "Donnie Yen's giddy action spoof Protege de la Rose Noire/Gin chap hak moooi gwai/Jian xi hei mei gui (2004) combined Lau's approach with action filmmaking and capitalized on the popularity of the Twins (Gillian Chung and Charlene Choi); in this latest version Teresa Mo plays 'Black Rose.' The opening credits are a throwback to the days of Chan Po-chu with an update to the Powerpuff Girls and Charlie's Angels (the movies and the TV series)."
