= 92 Legendary La Rose Noire =

1992 Hong Kong film by Jeffrey Lau

- Film poster
- Traditional Chinese: 92黑玫瑰對黑玫瑰
- Simplified Chinese: 92黑玫瑰对黑玫瑰
- Hanyu Pinyin: Jiǔ Èr Hēi Méi Guī Duì Hēi Méi Guī
- Jyutping: Gau2 Ji6 Hak1 Mui4 Gwai3 Deoi3 Hak1 Mui4 Gwai3
- Directed by: Jeffrey Lau
- Screenplay by: Jeffrey Lau
- Produced by: Laura Fau; Chiu Li-kuan
- Starring: Tony Leung; Maggie Shiu; Teresa Mo; Wong Wan-sze; Fung Bo Bo
- Cinematography: Chan Yuen-kai
- Edited by: Hai Kit-wai
- Music by: Lowell Lo
- Production company: Hoventin Films Production Company
- Distributed by: Hoventin Films
- Release date: 2 July 1992
- Running time: 94 minutes
- Country: Hong Kong
- Language: Cantonese
- Box office: HK$22,806,044

92 Legendary La Rose Noire is a 1992 Hong Kong comedy film written and directed by Jeffrey Lau and starring Tony Leung, Maggie Shiu, Teresa Mo, Wong Wan-sze and Fung Bo Bo. The film was nominated for eight awards at the 12th Hong Kong Film Awards, where Leung won his second Hong Kong Film Award for Best Actor and Fung won her first Hong Kong Film Award for Best Supporting Actress. 92 Legendary La Rose Noire was ranked number 75 of the Best 100 Chinese Motion Pictures at the 24th Hong Kong Film Awards. The film was followed two sequels, one released in 1993 titled Rose Rose I Love You, with Leung reprising his role but with a new storyline, and another released in 1997 confusingly titled Black Rose II, also featuring a new storyline and a different cast.

== Plot ==
Children's novel writer Butterfly Wong (Maggie Shiu) is unsuccessful in her career and relationship. One time, while attempting suicide, a couple nearby mistakes her for a robber. Wanting to return items left behind by the couple, Butterfly heads to the couple's home, accompanied by her friend, Chow Wai-kuen (Teresa Mo). There, they witness an illegal drug trade, followed by a mutual slaughter among the drug dealers. In order to avoid police suspicion, Butterfly imitates Black Rose, a vigilante character who appeared in 1960s Hong Kong films by director Chor Yuen, and leaves a note behind. As a result, The real Black Rose's apprentices, Piu-hung (Fung Bo Bo) and Yim-fan (Wong Wan-sze), kidnap Butterfly. Detective Keith Lui (Tony Leung), who has a crush on Butterfly, proceeds to rescue her. However, Piu-hung and Yim-fan mistake Keith for their ex-lover and locks him up as well.

== Cast ==
- Tony Leung Ka-fai as Keith Lui (呂奇), a police detective who resides above Butterfly's apartment and has a crush on her.
- Maggie Shiu as Butterfly Wong (黃蝴蝶), a children's novel writer.
- Teresa Mo as Chow Wai-kuen (周維娟), Butterfly's best friend.
- Wong Wan-sze as Yim-fan (豔芬), Black Rose #1, Black Rose's apprentice who has an aggressive personality.
- Fung Bo Bo as Piu-hung (飄紅), Black Rose #2, Black Rose's apprentice who suffers from amnesia.
- Lawrence Ah Mon as Butterfly's superior and the head publisher.
- Chan Fai-hung as Fred (林超), Wai-kuen's husband.
- Teddy Yip as Fred's insurance agency boss.
- Lam Lap-sam as Alan, a drug dealer who mistaken Butterfly to be a robber and was killed by Mo Leung.
- Karen Suen as Apple, Alan's girlfriend who colludes with Mo Leung before being shot and killed by the latter.
- Calvin Poon as a news reporter.
- Thomas Lam as Chuen (阿全), a police officer and Butterfly's ex-wife.
- Cheung Ying-choi as Superintendent Cheung (張警司), the head of the police station who knows about the legend of Black Rose.
- Guy Lai as Superintendent Lai (黎警司), a corrupt officer who colludes with Mo Leung.
- Chan Yuen-kai as Jinx (夜叉), a rascal who is Butterfly's neighbor.
- Cheung Kwok-leung as Mo Leung (巫良), Mad Bill's top underling.
- Yip Chun as Mad Bill (喪標), a drug dealer.
- Lam Sing-ming as Mo Leung's fat underling who spied on Wai-kuen and knocked her unconscious.
- Yue Ming as Uncle #1 at Yim-fan's wedding.
- Bak Man-biu as Uncle #2 at Yim-fan's wedding.
- Szema Wah Lung as Uncle #3 at Yim-fan's wedding.
- Fong Ping as Aunt 13 (十三姨), who shows up at Yim-fan's wedding.
- Tang Tai-wo as one of Bill's thugs.
- Lam Kwok-kit as one of Bills thugs.
- Ng Kwok-kin as a policeman
- Alex Yip as one of Bill's thugs.
- Lui Siu-ming as one of Bill's thugs.
- Yeung Jing-jing

== Music ==
=== Theme song ===
- The Beautiful Butterfly (美麗的花蝴蝶)
  - Composer/Lyricist/Singer: Jeremy Chang

=== Insert theme ===
- Ex-Love is Like a Dream (舊歡如夢)
  - Composer: Hsu Shi
  - Lyricist: Pong Chau-wah
  - Singer: Wong Wan-sze, Fung Bo Bo, Lowell Lo
- Come Back (你回來吧)
  - Composer: Ichikawa Shousuke
  - Lyricist: Yim Foon
  - Singer: Wong Wan-sze, Fung Bo Bo, Lowell Lo

== Reception ==
=== Critical ===
Andrew Sarooch of Far East Films gave the film a score of 3.5 out of 5 stars praising the performance of actors Tony Leung Ka-fai and Fung Bo Bo, the action sequences and director Jeffrey Lau's direction as "Colourful, genre-defying and almost out-of-control". LoveHKFilm gave the film a positive review, praising Leung's comedic performance and states although the film "may lose some people, but it nonetheless possesses its own unique sensibilities and an inexplicable bizarre charm".

=== Box office ===
The film HK$22,806,044 at the Hong Kong box office during its theatrical run from 2 July to 23 December 1993.

== Awards and nominations ==
Awards and nominations
Ceremony	Category	Recipient	Outcome
12th Hong Kong Film Awards	Best Film	92 Legendary La Rose Noire	Nominated
12th Hong Kong Film Awards	Best Director	Jeffrey Lau	Nominated
12th Hong Kong Film Awards	Best Screenplay	Jeffrey Lau	Nominated
12th Hong Kong Film Awards	Best Actor	Tony Leung Ka-fai	Won
12th Hong Kong Film Awards	Best Supporting Actress	Fung Bo Bo	Won
12th Hong Kong Film Awards	Best Supporting Actress	Teresa Mo	Nominated
12th Hong Kong Film Awards	Best Supporting Actress	Wong Wan-sze	Nominated
12th Hong Kong Film Awards	Best Costume Make Up Design	Joseph Chan	Nominated
12th Hong Kong Film Awards	Best Original Film Score	Lowell Lo	Nominated
24th Hong Kong Film Awards	Best 100 Chinese Motion Pictures	92 Legendary La Rose Noire (#75)	Won
