= To Crack the Dragon Gate =

1970 Hong Kong film by Fung Chi Kong

- Directed by: Fung Chi Kong
- Written by: Lo Yu Chi
- Production company: Union Film Production
- Release date: 1971
- Country: Hong Kong
- Language: Cantonese

To Crack the Dragon Gate or Du zhang zhen long men is a 1971 Taiwanese action film directed by Fung Chi Kong in his last picture. The film stars Josephine Siao and Kenneth Tsang.

== Cast ==
- Josephine Siao
- Kenneth Tsang
- Petrina Fung
- Lam Kau
- Yam Yin
- Kwan Hoi San
- Yuk-Yi Yung
- Yeung Yip Wang
- Hui Ying Sau
- Ho Pak Kwong
