= Matt Mullins =

American martial artist

- Height: 6 ft 1 in (185 cm)
- Style: Okinawan Shōrei-ryū Karate
- Teacher: John Sharkey Jr.
- Rank: 7th degree black belt in Shōrei-ryū Purple Belt in Brazilian Jiu-Jitsu

Other information
- Occupation: Martial artist, actor
- Spouse: Alicia Vela-Bailey (m. 2015)
- Website: matthewmullins.com

Matt Mullins is an American actor and martial artist. At the age of 16, in 2000, he won his first World Kickboxing Association title in Dublin, Ireland. This would be his first of five championships in the next three years.

== Martial arts career ==
Mullins was featured in the Discovery Channel mini-series Extreme Martial Arts alongside Mike Chat. As of 2024, he held 7th degree Black belt in the style Shōrei-ryū and studied under martial arts instructor John Sharkey at Sharkey's Karate Studio in Naperville, Illinois.

While an underbelt, he met Mike Chaturantabut and together they created a martial arts style which later became known as Extreme Martial Arts (XMA). Their style's growing popularity prompted the Discovery Channel to produce a documentary called XMA: Extreme Martial Arts. In this documentary, the producers covered the XMA style with modern technology such as motion-capture and 3D imaging to show how a martial artist can use their body. As a side story, they focused on Matt Mullins' attempt to return to the competition world of sport karate.

Matt Mullins is the founder and creator of the Sideswipe Performance Team. He created this extreme martial arts group in 2002 after appearing on the show 30 seconds to Fame. From there he grew Sideswipe and began traveling around the world with everyone a part of the team to do these performances.

Mullins holds seminars and martial arts camps. He has appeared on shows such as The Jerry Lewis Telethon, The Wayne Brady Show, America's Got Talent and The Ellen DeGeneres Show, as well as at sporting events, live action shows and karate tournaments.

== Acting career ==
Mullins has appeared in national commercials for Motorola, America Online, Applebee's, Nike, Hanes and Pepsi as well as a lead actor in several films including Kung Fu Love Triangle, Bloodfist 2050, and Adventures of Johnny Tao: Rock Around the Dragon. He had a lead role portraying the character Len/Kamen Rider Wing Knight on the in-production TV show Kamen Rider: Dragon Knight. He also helped Mike Moh get the role of Hunt/Danny Cho/Kamen Rider Axe in the same show through their shared martial arts training.

Mullins was a reporter for LX TV 1st Look television program introducing DJ Hapa, as well as Shinkendo. He starred as Johnny Cage in the Kevin Tancharoen directed short film Mortal Kombat: Rebirth.

== Filmography ==
=== Films ===
- 2005 Wentworth as Waiter
- 2007 Adventures of Johnny Tao: Rock Around the Dragon as Eddie
- 2009 Blood and Bone as "Pretty Boy" Price
- 2010 Freshmyn as Zach Markey
- 2010 Mortal Kombat: Rebirth as Johnny Cage
- 2012 Alpha Must Die as "Blue"
- 2013 The Wrath of Vajra as K-23 / Bill
- 2013 Resident Evil: Vengeance as Chris Redfield
- 2014 Divergent as Fighter On Ring
- 2015 White Tiger as Michael Turner

=== Stunt work ===
- 2002 Ted Bundy as Michael Reilly Burke's Stunt Double
- 2005 No Rules as Brotherhood Fighter
- 2009 Severed as Fight Choreographer
- 2014 Agents of S.H.I.E.L.D. as Fight Coordinator
- 2015 Masterless as Stunt Coordinator
- 2017 Defenders as Stunt Coordinator
- 2018 Luke Cage season 2 as fight coordinator

=== Video games ===
- 1995 Area 51 as Voice
- 2002 Resident Evil (2002) as Face Model For Chris Redfield
- 2003 Tao Feng: Fist of the Lotus as Voice
- 2004 The Lord of the Rings: The Battle for Middle-Earth as Voice
- 2007 Resident Evil: The Umbrella Chronicles – Face model for Chris Redfield
- 2007 Uncharted: Drake's Fortune as Motion Capture For Nathan Drake
- 2009 Resident Evil 5 as Face Model For Chris Redfield
- 2012 Resident Evil 6 as Face Model For Chris Redfield
- 2019 Death Stranding as MULEs

=== Television ===
- 2006 Final Fu as Himself / Competitor
- 2007 America's Got Talent as Himself / Performer
- 2008-2009 Kamen Rider: Dragon Knight as Len / Kamen Rider Wing Knight (Main Role)
- 2009 Misadventures in Matchmaking as Cobin In "The Love Portal"
- 2011 Mortal Kombat: Legacy as Johnny Cage
- 2011 Team Unicorn as Beach Stud In "Alien Beach Crashers"
- 2012 Kickin' It as Trent Darby In "It Takes Two To Tangle"
- 2012 Métal Hurlant Chronicles as Julian In "King's Crown"
- 2014 Agents of S.H.I.E.L.D. as Centipede Soldier In "The Magical Place"

=== Director ===
- The Johnnies – 5 episodes

=== Producer ===
- 2013 Resident Evil: Vengeance
- The Johnnies – 5 episodes
