= Showdown (1993 film) =

1993 American martial arts film

- Directed by: Robert Radler
- Screenplay by: Stuart Gibbs
- Produced by: Alan Schechter; Ash R. Shah
- Starring: Billy Blanks; Kenn Scott; Christine Taylor; John Mallory Asher; Patrick Kilpatrick; Brion James
- Cinematography: Bryan Duggan
- Edited by: Florent Retz
- Music by: Stephen Edwards
- Distributed by: Imperial Entertainment; Tilford Productions
- Release date: 17 September 1993
- Running time: 100 minutes
- Country: United States
- Language: English

Showdown (also known as American Karate Tiger) is a 1993 action/martial arts film directed by Robert Radler. The film stars Billy Blanks, Kenn Scott, Christine Taylor, Ken McLeod, Patrick Kilpatrick, and Brion James.

The movie is reminiscent of 1984's The Karate Kid. Blanks has the Pat Morita role and Scott is in Ralph Macchio's; Taylor and McLeod have the Elisabeth Shue and William Zabka roles, respectively, while Kilpatrick is in Martin Kove's.

== Plot ==
Billy Grant is a police officer who is called to stop a noise complaint at a local party. Along with his partner, Spinelli, Billy enters the house to find two men causing all sorts of trouble. When Billy attempts to stop things peacefully, one of the thugs attempts to assault Billy, who uses his unarmed combat skills to stop the thug. However, when he puts the thug down, the thug's head smacks hard against the stairs. The other troublemaker looks in horror and yells to Billy, "You killed my brother, pig!". Spinelli shows up and arrests the one thug. Billy attempts to revive the thug's brother, but he ends up dead. Feeling guilt for what has happened, Billy decides to quit the police force.

Seven years later, we see Ken Marks and his mother. They are new to the area and Ken's mother has been looking for work, hence the reason for the move from Kansas. It is Ken's senior year in high school and already, his first day has led him to embarrassment. He sees a girl, Julie, and he decides he wants to get to know her. When he learns she is in the same class, he is warned by Mike, who becomes his new friend, to stay away from Julie. During a visit at the library, Ken decides to meet Julie despite Mike's warning. Julie's boyfriend, Tom, is the high school bully and when he sees Ken talking to Julie, he is given a verbal thrashing. However, Julie defuses the situation when she explains that Ken is new and didn't know about him. After school, he is met by Tom and his buddy Rob, who once again bully Ken with Tom warning him to stay away from Julie. It is there where the janitor asks if he is okay. The janitor is none other than Billy. Billy takes Ken to his janitor's room and the two get to know each other briefly before Ken leaves.

That night, Tom and Rob are at their dojo when the teacher is revealed to be Lee, the troublemaker from the opening of the film whose brother Billy accidentally killed. Lee is seen a ruthless fighter when Kate, Lee's henchwoman attracts Tom's attention. Lee easily disposes of a student showing his aggressive behavior. The next day, Julie attempts to apologize to Ken for what had happened the day before. Tom once again sees Ken with Julie in class and starts having a fit before Rob and Rob's girlfriend Gina calm him down. When Tom catches Ken in the library, he and Rob chase Ken to the gym. Once again, they try to bully him but Billy comes to the rescue and is able to stop Tom and Rob. Billy quickly disappears and when Mike and other students show up. They think Ken has beat the two of them up but Ken constantly tries to deny it. It takes Ken going to the janitor's room to convince Mike that Billy was responsible. Ken is now worried that if the truth gets out, he will be in serious trouble. That night at the dojo, Tom takes his aggression from the gym fight out on Rob during sparring. Kate sees Tom's bruised face and takes him to Lee. Lee is unhappy with what happened and constantly smacks him. He threatens Tom that if he fails again, he will be lucky if he lets him live.

At lunch the next day, Tom confronts Ken when he has heard that he took the credit for his beating the day before. Ken tries to deny it and reason with Tom. However, Tom doesn't listen and proceeds to humiliate Ken by beating him down with his martial arts skills. When Ken is seriously hurt, Mike takes him to Billy. A stunned Billy asks what has happened and Ken, in a fit of rage and embarrassment, tells Billy that he told her mother he didn't want to move. Billy finally tells Ken that he needs to learn to defend himself, and that he will teach him. After school, Billy and Ken begin their training by making Ken do some of Billy's duties by cleaning toilets, dumping trash, and other janitorial duties before they get into the physical training. Ken, focusing on his training, tells Julie that as much as he wants to be friends with her, he can't out of fear for Tom's bullying.

One night, after training, Ken is approached by Tom, who attempts to once again beat Ken. However, Ken uses mainly defensive moves until Tom attempts a crescent kick and Ken counters with a shot to the groin and runs fast. He then is met by Kate, who tells him to get in her car. She takes him to the dojo, which is also a front for an illegal martial arts competition in which it is revealed that Lee and Tom have been winners in. Kate offers Ken an advance to eventually come up to fight in the ring. Ken refuses and the next day, ken explains to Billy about the money the fighters make. This angers Billy, who has been going undercover and tracking the dojo down. Billy finally reveals to Ken that he was once a cop and he regrets quitting. Ken knows that Billy wants to take the dojo down because of the kids who are fighting. That night, Billy and Spinelli, who Billy called earlier in the day, reunite at the dojo but come up with nothing. Billy takes photos and as the duo walk out, they are met by some of Lee's men. Both Billy and Spinelli fend off the thugs and escape.

The next day, Lee sees the surveillance footage and goes on a rampage when he learns that it was Billy who was responsible. Lee sends two men, James and another hitman, to find Billy and kill him. That night after work, Billy is confronted by the hitmen. Billy gets injured, but ultimately gets the upper hand and leaves. That same night, Julie, tired of Tom's antics, breaks up with him and calls Ken to pick her up. The two talk during a small bonfire and Julie asks why Ken is learning martial arts. Ken tells Julie that he wants to stop Tom because he cares about her and wants to take her from him, in which she replies that he has already won her heart. Ken and Julie start a relationship.

The following morning, police tape is all over the gym and Ken is concerned and he thinks Billy may be involved. When Tom attempts to woo Julie again, Julie reminds Tom that they broke up and if he touches her again, she will make sure Ken deals with him. Tom is infuriated and smacks Julie across the face, prompting Ken to push Tom away. Ken warns Tom never to touch her again. Tom claims to own Julie but Ken reminds him that he doesn't own anyone. As Ken and Tom are about to go to blows, they are stopped by Rob and Gina, Ken decides enough is enough and takes up Tom's challenge to fight at Lee's dojo that Friday night. Without Billy, Ken begins to train hard and even teaches the nerdy Mike a little martial arts too. Meanwhile, Tom really lets his anger out on Rob, who also has had enough of Tom's aggressive behavior.

When the fight is on, Julie is worried that Ken will lose badly. Mike tells Julie that he called the police and told them to show up, but can't remember the time. Both Tom and Ken go back and forth hitting each other to the delight of the crowd. However, Tom soon gets the upper hand, making Lee very happy. When Tom nearly knocks out Ken, Ken looks on the ground and sees Mike and Julie, Billy returns in time, forcing Ken to begin to get the upper hand. As Tom attempts to attack, Ken continues to counter and attack. He finally beats Tom by using a spin kick followed by a jump spinning kick, knocking Tom out. As Ken raises his hand in victory, Lee, upset at Tom, knocks him down and begins to pummel Tom. Ken attempts to stop Lee, but fails. As Lee chokes Tom, Billy intervenes and now, it is between Lee and Billy. Both try to out do each other, with Tom now rooting for Billy. However, Lee resorts to dirty tactics such as whipping Billy with a belt and then choking him with the belt, but Billy stops Lee and begins his assault. When he tells Lee he won't hurt any more kids, Billy does the jump spinning kick he taught Ken and knocks Lee out. The police show up and as Kate attempts to escape, she is stopped by Mike. Tom, finally realizing his mistake, offers his hand to Ken only to stop and tells him he will see him around and thanks Billy for saving him. Ken kisses Julie and Mike intervenes saying it's time to go. Meanwhile, thanks to what has happened, Spinelli is thrilled to learn Billy is planning a full return to the police force.

== Cast ==
- Billy Blanks as Billy Grant
- Kenn Scott as Ken Marks
- Christine Taylor as Julie
- John Mallory Asher as Mike
- Ken McLeod as Tom
- Patrick Kilpatrick as Lee
- Linda Dona as Kate
- Michael Cavalieri as Rob
- Seidy López as Gina
- Brion James as Vice Principal Kowalski
- Mike Genovese as Officer Spinelli (credited as Michael Genovese)
- Nicholas Hill as James
- Debbie Bartelt as Shirley
- Michael Collins as Max
- Jeremy Duddleston as Bob
- Cathy Dresbach as Miss Worthington
- James Lew as Hit Man
- Ray Gamboa as Thug
- Ryan Koch as Marty (uncredited)
- David Van Wie as Jeff "Joltin Jeff" Suede (uncredited)
