= Mad, Mad 83 =

1983 Hong Kong film by Chor Yuen

- Film poster
- Hanyu Pinyin: Feng kuang ba san
- Directed by: Chor Yuen
- Written by: Wong Jing; Tang Wing-hung; Lau Tin-chi
- Produced by: Mona Fong
- Starring: Tony Leung Chiu-wai
- Cinematography: Lin Chao
- Edited by: Ma Chung-yiu; Yu Shao-feng
- Music by: Stephen Shing; So Jan-Hau
- Production company: Shaw Brothers Studio
- Release date: 20 August 1983 (Hong Kong)
- Running time: 90 minutes
- Country: Hong Kong
- Language: Cantonese
- Box office: HK $5,301,780

Mad, Mad 83 (pinyin: Feng kuang ba san) is a 1983 Hong Kong Shaw Brothers comedy film directed by Chor Yuen. It marks the debut film of actor Tony Leung Chiu-wai. The film grossed HK $5,301,780 at the box office.
