= Last Song in Paris =

1986 Hong Kong film by Chor Yuen

- Film poster
- Traditional Chinese: 偶然
- Simplified Chinese: 偶然
- Hanyu Pinyin: Ŏu Rán
- Jyutping: Au2 Jin4
- Directed by: Chor Yuen
- Written by: Chor Yuen
- Starring: Leslie Cheung; Anita Mui; Joey Wong; Cecilia Yip
- Cinematography: Lee Sun-yip
- Edited by: Yiu Siu-sung; Ma Chung-yiu; Chiu Cheuk-man; Cheung Man-keung
- Music by: Tsui Yat-kan; Sing Kam-wing
- Production company: Rical Film Production
- Release date: 10 April 1986 (Hong Kong)
- Running time: 86 minutes
- Country: Hong Kong
- Language: Cantonese
- Box office: HK$4,506,769

Last Song in Paris (Chinese: 偶然) is a 1986 Hong Kong romance film written and directed by Chor Yuen and starring Leslie Cheung, Anita Mui, Joey Wong and Cecilia Yip

== Plot ==
Louie (Leslie Cheung), a spoiled pop star, has a one-night stand with beautiful dancer, Anita (Anita Mui). When Anita tells Louie that she dreamed of becoming a singer, he brings her to the stage and she becomes a star. Anita has fallen in love with Louie, but Louie loves Julia (Joey Wong). However, Louie later finds out that Julia is dating his father, Kent (Paul Chu). Louie then leaves Hong Kong and heads to Paris, leaving his career behind. Then he meets, Yuan Yu-shih (Cecilia Yip), a Vietnamese refugee who suffers from a war wound. In Paris, Louie lives his new life happily as a dishwasher with his new lover. However, his past life starts to come back when Anita comes to pay a visit.

== Cast ==
- Leslie Cheung - Louie.
- Anita Mui - Anita Chow.
- Joey Wong - Julia.
- Cecilia Yip - Yuan Yu-shih.
- Paul Chu - Kent.
- Tin Ching - Mr. Hsu.
- Charlie Cho - Charlie.
- Hung Nam as Chin Mei.
- Benz Hui - David.
- Ho Pak-kwong - Man servant.

== Box office ==
The film grossed HK$4,506,769 at the Hong Kong box office.
