= No Rules (film) =

2005 film

No Rules is a 2005 action film directed by Gerry Anderson. Produced by Romeo Antonio, it follows a small-town man, haunted by his parents murder, who wants to become a mixed martial artist.

== Cast ==
- David Dunn as Kurt Diamond
- Randy Couture as Mason
- Tom Sizemore as Kain Diamond
- Gary Busey as Leroy Little
- Pamela Anderson as herself
- Bruce Buffer as himself
- Romeo Antonio as drug dealer
- Matt Mullins as Brotherhood Fighter
