= Bow-sim Mark =

Chinese martial artist

- Born: 1942 (age 83–84); Guangzhou, Republic of China
- Native name: 麥寶嬋
- Style: Chinese martial arts Taijiquan; Northern Shaolin; Wudangquan; Fu Style Baguazhang
- Teacher: Fu Wing Fay
- Rank: Grandmaster

Other information
- Spouse: Klyster Yen
- Children: Donnie Yen (son); Chris Yen (daughter)
- Notable club: Bow Sim Mark Tai Chi Arts Association
- Notable school: Chinese Wushu Research Institute

Chinese name
- Traditional Chinese: 麥寶嬋
- Simplified Chinese: 麦宝婵
Transcriptions
Standard Mandarin
- Hanyu Pinyin: Mài Bǎochán
Yue: Cantonese
- Yale Romanization: Mahk Bóu Sìhm

Bow-sim Mark (born 1942) is a Chinese martial arts grandmaster who lives in Newton, Massachusetts, US. She is the mother of martial arts film star, Donnie Yen.

== Training ==
Mark was born in Guangzhou, Republic of China in 1942. She began studying martial arts at elementary school, training seriously in high school and then at Wushu training schools, specialising in tai chi and Northern Shaolin. Mark learned Fu-Style Wudangquan by training under Fu Wing Fay for 10 years; Wing Fay was the eldest son and top student of Grandmaster Fu Chen Sung. She was an instructor at Wing Fay's school from 1968 to 1974.

== Career ==
After living for years in Hong Kong, Mark emigrated to Brighton, Massachusetts, United States in 1975, and founded the Chinese Wushu Research Institute in July 1976. She still teaches and performs in the Boston area. She was one of the first to provide Chinese wushu instruction in the West, and is credited with popularizing the term Wushu outside of China. She gave the first demonstration of Combined tai chi in the United States, and published the first description of the technique in 1975. Mark won a gold medal at the first International Tournament of tai chi in Wuhan City in 1984. She was named Black Belt magazine's Kung-Fu artist of the year for 1995.

One of her specialities is her Wudang sword dance. She played the part of a 'kung fu diva' in a play, Mum and Shah at the Lyric Stage theater in Boston in 1995.

Black Belt magazine named her one of the most influential martial artists of the 20th century.

== Personal life ==
Mark is married to the newspaper editor Klyster Yen. They have two children, a son, martial arts movie star Donnie Yen, and a daughter, Chris Yen, who placed All-round Third division in the First International Wushu tournament in 1986 as the youngest competitor, and who has also joined the film industry.
