= Fu-style baguazhang =

Chinese martial art

Fu-style Baguazhang 傅氏八卦掌
- Also known as: Fu-style Wudangquan
- Hardness: Internal (neijia)
- Country of origin: China
- Creator: Fu Zhensong
- Famous practitioners: Fu Wing Fay, Bow-sim Mark, Lin Chao Zhen, Victor Shenglong; To Yu
- Parenthood: Chen-style tai chi, Baguazhang, Wudang sword, Sun-style tai chi, Yang-style tai chi, Xingyiquan
- Olympic sport: No

Fu-style baguazhang
- Chinese: 傅振嵩
Transcriptions
Standard Mandarin
- Hanyu Pinyin: Fu Zhènsōng

Fu Qiankun
- Chinese: 傅乾
Transcriptions

Fu-style Wudangquan is a family style of Chinese martial arts encompassing tai chi, xingyiquan, baguazhang, liangyiquan, bajiquan, and Wudang Sword. Fu Style Baguazhang is one of the five styles of baguazhang recognized as orthodox in China. It is the highest form of the Fu-style martial arts.

== History ==
Fu Zhensong began learning Chen-style tai chi at age 16 from the famous Chen Family master, Chen Yanxi. Three years later, Fu began learning Baguazhang from Jia Fengming. Fu was one of the first to learn these arts, as the Chen family had only started teaching their art to outsiders a few decades earlier; Dong Haichuan had only revealed Baguazhang a few decades earlier, and only took on a handful of students, one of them being Jia Fengming. Although Fu did not receive the formal schooling of his urban countrymen, Fu was very bright, learned the two arts well, and practiced very hard.

At the age of 26, Fu had become very famous for single-handedly defeating a large mob of bandits, a story that appears in a number of versions.

During this time, Fu met, befriended and exchanged information with the top Baguazhang masters of China. He became close friends with Sun Lutang, and taught him the Baguazhang "mud-walking step (tang ni bu)." Fu studied Yang-style tai chi from Yang Chengfu, and one day beat him in a match of "push hands." Yang said, "You only won because you switched to Baguazhang." Fu also studied swordsmanship with Li Jinglin.

Fu Zhensong and four other winners of the competition were invited to the south to teach their arts. Because of this historic event, they were called, "The Five Northern Tigers." These five men were constantly challenged by martial artists in the south, as the southern martial artists were very proud of their arts and refuted the arts of the north. Fu Zhensong never lost a fight or a challenge.

Fu Zhensong moved to Guangzhou in Guangdong Province, and headed a school there. By this time, Fu had synthesized his own system by learning various family styles of tai chi; the differing styles of baguazhang; the Wudang Sword from Song Weiyi (likely learned from Li Jinglin, though Fu did study under Song for a time); Xingyiquan and Bajiquan; by emphasizing the most important principles and techniques from each, and by eliminating all of the parts he thought were not valuable or of no substance. Fu's style of Baguazhang would include such methods as the yin and yang palm changes, the famous Dragon Baguazhang, the sixiang form, the liangyi synthesis of Baguazhang and tai chi and his own version of tai chi. A number of the names used were likely inspired by the I Ching, and the forms and progressions inspired by both that work and by the martial philosophies of Sun Lutang.

== Fu-style today ==
The Fu-style Wudangquan was carried on by his son Fu Wing Fay, who also created forms for sixiang, advanced tai chi and more. Among others, Fu taught Bow-sim Mark. The lineage is now held by his own son Victor Fu Sheng Long in Vancouver, Canada. Victor Fu has somewhat truncated the style because he feels there is not enough time to learn the entirety of the Fu-style system, and it is more important to develop health and wellness, rather than "hands that can chop a table in two." However, with the incorporated conditioning exercises, 2-person routines and the practice of the Baguazhang form, the martial aspects remain intact. Another branch of the style was established by Fu Zhensong's student Lin Chao Zhen, who likewise modified the teaching methodology.
