= Adventures of Johnny Tao =

- Directed by: Kenn Scott
- Written by: Kenn Scott
- Produced by: Fred Davis; Artie Glackin; Richard Kidd; Don Poquette; Cindi Rice; John Frank Rosenblum
- Starring: Matthew Twining; Chris Yen; Matt Mullins; Kelly Perine; James Hong; Jason London
- Cinematography: Matt Sohn
- Music by: Original: Gerard K. Marino
- Production company: Monkey House Productions
- Release date: February 3, 2007
- Country: United States
- Language: English

Adventures of Johnny Tao is a 2007 kung fu-zombie film written and directed by Kenn Troum, under the name Kenn Scott. It stars Matthew Twining, Chris Yen, Matt Mullins, Kelly Perine, James Hong, and Jason London.

== Plot ==
Johnny Dow struggles to make a living at his small town gas station by charging motorists to see the electric guitar used by his late father, who was a one-hit-rock and roll wonder. Legend has it the guitar was carved in the shape of a dragon's head and made in part from an ancient spear his father found in the crater of a shooting star. When Johnny's friend Eddie stumbles upon the other half of the spear he releases an ancient demon hungry for power and destruction. Mika, a beautiful Chinese warrior who holds the secret to fighting Eddie and his army of kung-fu, sugar-craving warriors reveals to Johnny that the only way to stop the evil spirit is to use the first half of the spear - the dragon on Johnny's guitar! Together Johnny and Mika set out to fight Eddie and his army, reunite the two halves of the spear, restore peace to the town and - of course - save the world!

== Cast ==
- Matthew Twining as Johnny Dow
- Chris Yen as Mika
- James Hong as Sifu
- Jason London as Jimmy Dow
