= Hung Nam =

Chinese actress and producer

- Chinese: 南紅
- Born: So Shook-mei (Chinese: 蘇淑眉); 1934 (age 91–92)
- Other names: Hong Nan, Siu Nam-Hung, So Shook-Mei, Nam Hung
- Occupations: Actress; film producer
- Years active: 1952–1997
- Known for: Co-founder of Rose Motion Picture Company
- Spouse: Chor Yuen (1967–2022)

Hung Nam (Chinese: 南紅, born 1934), born So Shook-Mei (Chinese: 蘇淑眉), is a Chinese actress and film producer from Hong Kong. Nam is credited with over 170 films.

== Career ==
Nam started as a Cantonese opera performer and she was a Hung Sin Nui’s protégé. Nam studied Cantonese opera under Hung Sin Nui for six years.

In 1952, Nam started her acting career. Nam debuted in Red Rose, the Songstress, a 1952 drama film directed by Chun Kim. Nam was known for her lead role as Xiaolongnü in The Story of the Great Heroes (Part 1 to Part 4), 1960-1961 martial arts films directed by Lee Fa. The films were an adaption from Louis Cha's novel The Return of the Condor Heroes. In 1962, Nam co-founded Rose Motion Picture Company. In 1963, Nam became a producer. Nam was both a producer and a lead actress in films such as Tear-Laden Rose (1963), The Black Rose (1965), Love Never Fades (1965), Spy with My Face (1966), and Wise Wives and Foolish Husbands (1969), where her husband was the director. Nam's last film was Black Rose II, a 1997 comedy film directed by Jeff Lau Chun-Wai and Corey Yuen Kwai. Nam is credited with over 170 films.

== Filmography ==
=== Films ===
This is a partial list of films.

- 1952 Red Rose, the Songstress
- 1952 Girl in Red (Chinese: 一丈紅)
- 1952 A Melancholy Melody (Part 2)
- 1952 A Ready Lover
- 1954 Autumn - Chun Lan.
- 1957 She Married an Overseas Chinese (aka China Wife) - Chong So-Ching.
- 1957 The Whispering Palm (aka Moon Over Malaya) - Leung Choi Lin.
- 1959 Orchid in the Storm (aka Twilight of Love)
- 1960 The Story of the Great Heroes (Part 1) - Xiaolongnü
- 1960 The Story of the Great Heroes (Part 2)
- 1961 The Story of the Great Heroes (Part 3)
- 1961 The Story of the Great Heroes (Part 4)
- 1963 Tear-Laden Rose - also as Producer.
- 1965 The Black Rose - Chan Mei-Yi. Also as Producer.
- 1965 Love Never Fades - also as Producer.
- 1966 Spy with My Face - Chan Mei-Yi. Also as Producer.
- 1966 Lady Bond (Chivalrous Girl) - Lee Ping.
- 1967 The Great Lover - Lam Yuk-Hing.
- 1967 My Darling Wife
- 1967 Romance of a Teenage Girl (a.k.a. Young Love, a.k.a. A Young Girl's Love) - Kit-Hung.
- 1967 They All Fall in Love - Suk-Han.
- 1967 To Rose with Love - Actress, screenwriter.
- 1969 Wise Wives and Foolish Husbands - also as Producer.
- 1986 Last Song in Paris - Chin Mei.
- 1997 Black Rose II

== Personal life ==
Nam's husband was Chor Yuen, a film director, screenwriter, and actor. They were married since 1967 until Yuen's death in 2022.
