= Szema Wah Lung =

Hong Kong actor

- Traditional Chinese: 司馬華龍
- Simplified Chinese: 司马华龙
Transcriptions
Standard Mandarin
- Hanyu Pinyin: Sīmǎ Huàlóng
Yue: Cantonese
- Jyutping: si1 maa5 waa4 lung4

Tsang Sun Chiu
- Traditional Chinese: 曾順釗
- Simplified Chinese: 曾顺钊
Transcriptions
Standard Mandarin
- Hanyu Pinyin: Zēng Shùnzhāo
Yue: Cantonese
- Jyutping: zang1 seon6 chiu1

Tsang Sun Chiu (曾順釗), better known by stagename Szema Wah Lung (司馬華龍), (2 August 1921 – 27 July 2012) was a Hong Kong film actor. He was known for his roles as a veteran evergreen actor, the Green Leaf King (綠葉王). In many films he played police captains.

== Selected filmography ==
- Story of the White-Haired Demon Girl (1959)
- The Story of the Great Heroes (1960)
- Story of the Sword and the Sabre (1963)
- Naughty! Naughty! (1974)
- Bruce Lee and I (1976)
- Last Hero in China (1993)
- Drunken Master II (1994) - Senior in Restaurant #2
- The Blade (1995)
- My Left Eye Sees Ghosts (2002)
