= Hong Kong Film Archive =

Public film archive in Hong Kong

- 香港電影資料館
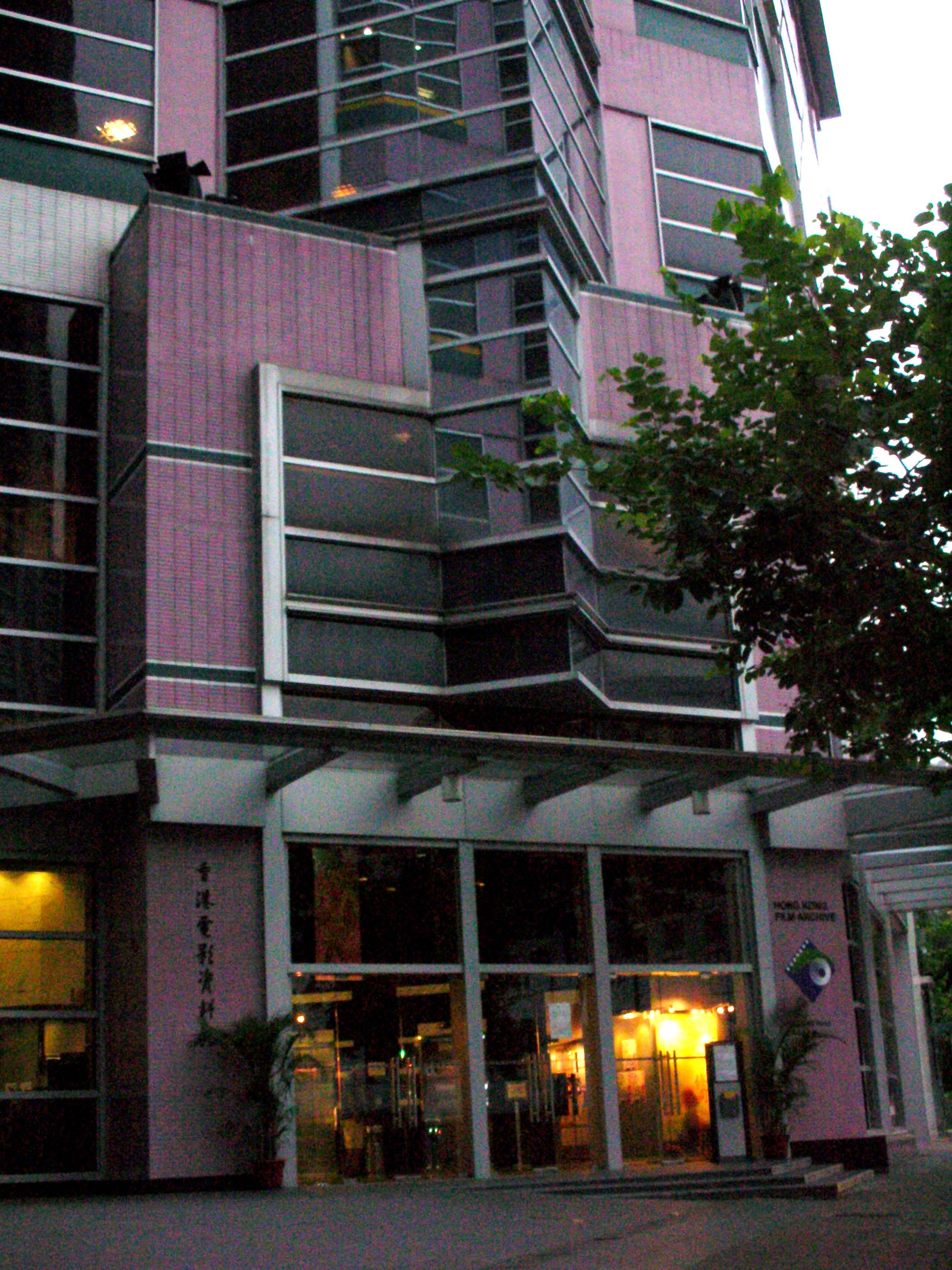
- Front entrance of the museum
- Established: 1993; 33 years ago
- Location: 50 Lei King Road, Sai Wan Ho, Hong Kong Island, Hong Kong
- Coordinates: 22.285161°N 114.222060°E
- Type: Public film archive
- Visitors: 96,000 (2025)
- Owner: Leisure and Cultural Services Department
- Public transit access: Sai Wan Ho station (Exit A)
- Website: filmarchive.gov.hk

Hong Kong Film Archive
- Traditional Chinese: 香港電影資料館
- Simplified Chinese: 香港电影资料馆
Transcriptions
Standard Mandarin
- Hanyu Pinyin: Xiānggǎng Diànyǐng Zīliào Guǎn
Yue: Cantonese
- Yale Romanization: Hēung góng dihn yíng jī líu gún
- Jyutping: Hoeng1 gong2 din6 jing2 zi1 liu2 gun2

The Hong Kong Film Archive is a public film archive that collects, preserves, and screens Hong Kong films and other related materials. The archive was founded in 1993, when its Planning Office was opened by the Urban Council. It joined the International Federation of Film Archives in 1996. The archive has been under the management of the Leisure and Cultural Services Department since 2000.

The film archive building in Sai Wan Ho regularly hosts exhibitions, screenings and seminars showcasing Hong Kong film.

The archive edits the book series Hong Kong Filmography and Monographs of Hong Kong Film Veterans. It also distributes a quarterly Newsletter that reports on the latest developments of the Archive and includes features on certain aspects of film culture.

== Collection ==
The Archive has received major donations from film industry figures and organizations.

In 2001, First Film Organisation Limited donated over 200 films from producer Wong Cheuk-hon's three production companies (Liberty Film Co., Lan Kwong Film Company, and First Film Organisation), along with over 10,000 items including posters, production stills, and newspaper clippings.

In 2011, TVB handed over about 1,000 film titles from the 1930s to the 1990s for permanent preservation. About 600 titles, including 27 Chaozhou and Amoy dialect films, were new to the collection. Notable acquisitions included Little Heroine (1939), the earliest Chinese film in TVB's library, and eight films from the HKFA's "100 Must-See Hong Kong Movies" list.

Goldig Films, Hong Kong's third-largest movie conglomerate in the 1970s owned by Indonesian-Chinese tycoon Alex Gouw, also made a donation in the 1990s including a susbtantial number of movie posters, marketing materials, contracts, as well as movie negatives and filming materails.

== Facility ==
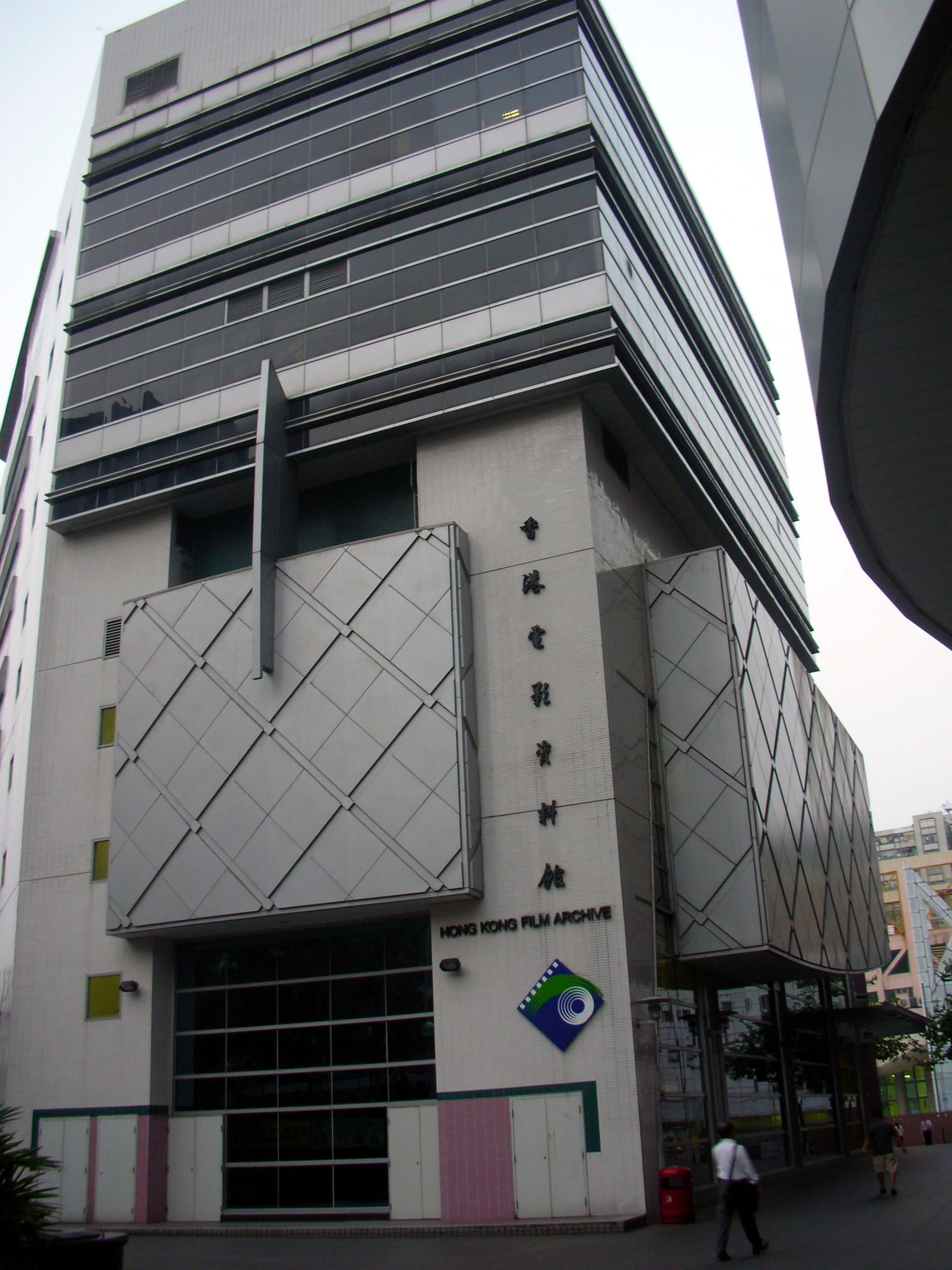
Back end of the building

The archive is housed in a five-story building at 50 Lei King Road, Sai Wan Ho, which opened on 3 January 2001. Public screenings of archive holdings are routinely held in the 125-seat cinema housed within. The regular ticket price is $40, with concessionary pricing available for students, seniors, and the disabled.

=== Floorplan ===
- Basement: Carpark and Plants Rooms (not open to the public)
- G/F: Box Office, Exhibition Hall
- M/F: Machine and Air-conditioning Plants Rooms (not open to the public)
- 1/F: Film Store and Cinema
- 2/F: Film Projection Room, Film Store and Cinema (entrance on 1/F)
- 3/F: Resource Centre, Staff Office and Film Store
- 4/F: Admin. Office, Film Related Material Store
- 5/F: Roof (scheduled for expansion)

Only the Box Office, Exhibition Hall and Resource Centre are public access facilities.

== Transportation ==
The archive building is approximately a five-minute walk from Exit A of Sai Wan Ho MTR station.
