= The Great Heroes =

1960 Hong Kong film by Lee Fa

- Promotional poster for Part 1
- 神鵰俠侶
- Directed by: Lee Fa
- Screenplay by: Chu Hak
- Based on: The Return of the Condor Heroes by Jin Yong
- Produced by: Ho Kuen-yip
- Starring: Patrick Tse; Nam Hung
- Production company: Emei Film Company
- Distributed by: Kong Ngee
- Release dates: 27 July 1960 (Part 1); 30 August 1960 (Part 2); 30 August 1961 (Part 3); 6 September 1961 (Part 4)
- Country: Hong Kong
- Language: Cantonese

The Great Heroes (神鵰俠侶), also known as The Story of the Great Heroes, is a four-part Hong Kong wuxia film adapted from the novel The Return of the Condor Heroes by Jin Yong. Parts 1 and 2 were released in 1960, and parts 3 and 4 were released in 1961.

== Cast ==
- Patrick Tse as Yang Guo
- Nam Hung as Xiaolongnü
- Lam Kau as Guo Jing
- Chan Wai-yue as Huang Rong
- Seung-gun Gwan-wai as Guo Fu
- Leung Siu-kam as Li Mochou
