= Rose Rose I Love You (film) =

1993 Hong Kong film by Jacky Pang

- Film poster
- Traditional Chinese: 玫瑰玫瑰我愛你
- Simplified Chinese: 玫瑰玫瑰我爱你
- Hanyu Pinyin: Méi Guī Méi Guī Wǒ Ài Nǐ
- Jyutping: Mui4 Gwai3 Mui4 Gwai3 Ngo5 Ngoi3 Nei2
- Directed by: Jacky Pang
- Screenplay by: Wang Chen-ho
- Produced by: Jeffrey Lau
- Starring: Tony Leung; Kenny Bee; Simon Yam; Carina Lau; Veronica Yip; Charine Chan
- Cinematography: Chan Yuen-kai
- Edited by: Hai Kit-wai
- Music by: Lowell Lo
- Production company: Regal Films
- Distributed by: Regal Films Distribution
- Release date: 27 March 1993
- Running time: 94 minutes
- Country: Hong Kong
- Language: Cantonese
- Box office: HK$21,929,420

Rose Rose I Love You is a 1993 Hong Kong comedy film directed by Jacky Pang and starring Tony Leung, Kenny Bee, Simon Yam, Carina Lau, Veronica Yip and Charine Chan. The film is a sequel to the 1992 film 92 Legendary La Rose Noire, with Leung reprising his role from the predecessor, but features a new storyline. It was followed by another sequel, confusingly titled Black Rose II, released in 1997, also featuring a new storyline and cast.

== Plot ==
Thief Micky was arrested by police detectives Keith Lui and Leung Sing-po while attempting to steal a priceless diamond called "Star of Malaysia". However, when this priceless gem goes missing, Micky frames Black Rose for stealing it, causing an uproar.

One night, Micky escapes from prison while Keith and Sing-po are ordered to bring him back to justice. The two had devised an ingenious scheme to get close to Micky's ex-lover, Pearl Chan, to search for clues. Meanwhile, Black Rose disguises herself as a civilian under the name of Beauty and gets close to Keith to clear her name, which causes a lot of headaches for Keith. Micky proceeds to retrieve the key to the "Star of Malaysia" from Pearl, who turns out to be the incarnation of White Rose, Black Rose's rival. Pearl has been investigating the whereabouts of the gem, but unbeknownst to her, the key is hidden in a necklace that she regularly wears, and Micky successfully retrieves the key. However, Mickyu's girlfriend, Lulu (Charine Chan), turns out to be White Rose's follower and tricks Micky into giving up the key. When Black Rose learns of this, she also proceeds to take the key and prove her innocence. At this time, Keith and Sing-po realize the true identities of their respective love interests, Beauty and Pearl. To get the key back, Micky ties a bomb around him and threatens to kill everyone.

== Cast ==
- Tony Leung Ka-fai as Keith Lui
- Kenny Bee as Leung Sing-po
- Simon Yam as Micky
- Carina Lau as Pearl Chan / White Rose
- Veronica Yip as Beauty / Black Rose
- Charine Chan as Lulu / White Rose No. 3
- Bowie Lam as Tam Tak-cheung
- Ku Feng as Angry dad of Tam's girlfriend
- Lo Hung as School headmaster / White Rose No. 2
- Tommy Leung as Keith's superior officer
- Jameson Lam as White Rose's gang member

== Reception ==
=== Critical ===
Andrew Saroch of Far East Films gave the film a score of three over five stars and describes the humor as "surreal, yet often engaging in a kind of baffling way." LoveHKFilm gave the film a mixed review describing the plot as not "making any sense" and also praising Tony Leung Ka-fai's comic charm.

=== Box office ===
The film grossed HK$21,929,420 at the Hong Kong box office during its theatrical run from 27 March to 30 April 1993.
