= Chor Yuen =

Chinese film director, screenwriter and actor from Hong Kong (1934–2022)

- 楚原
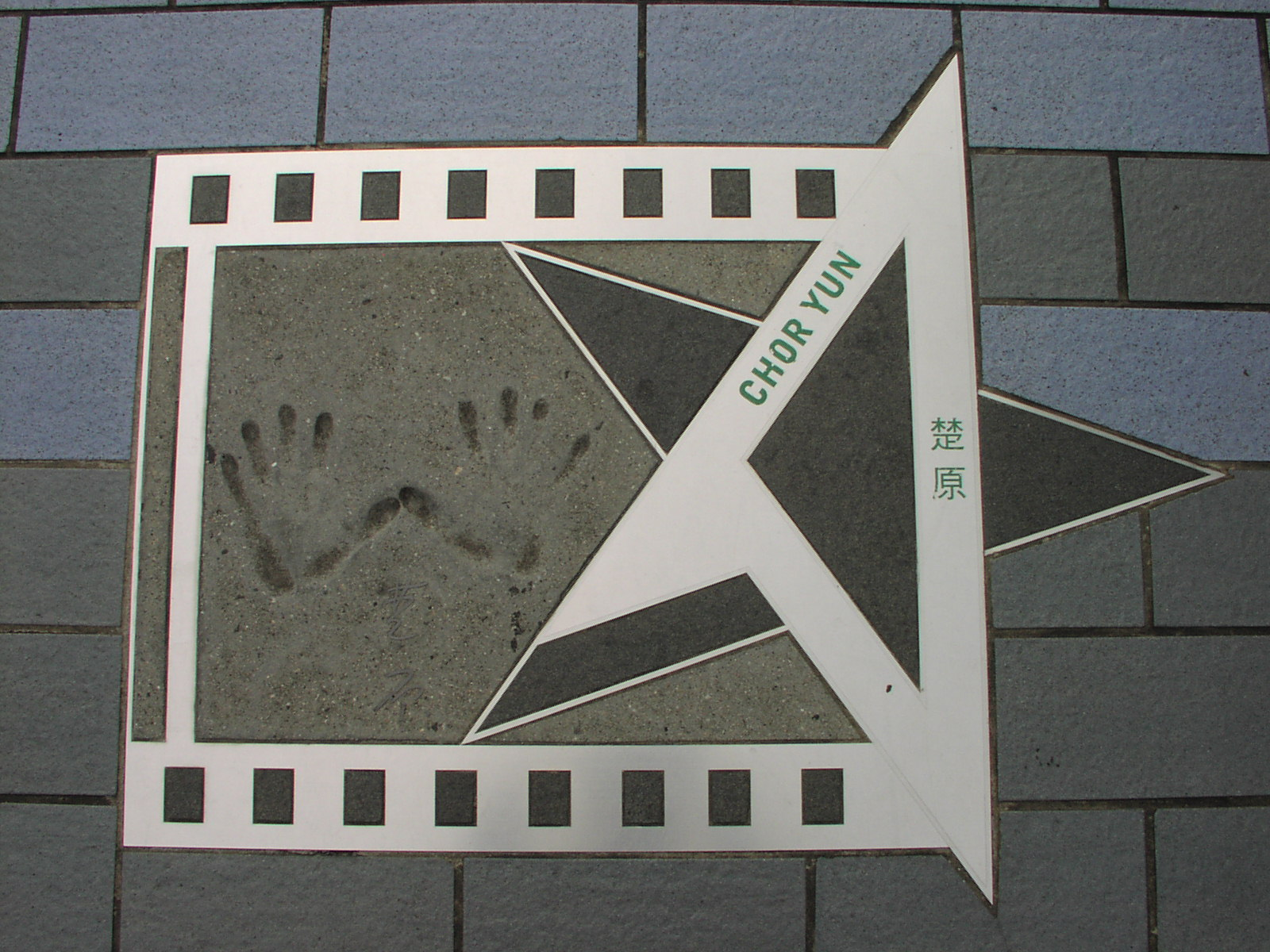
- Chor's handprints at Avenue of Stars in 2007
- Born: Cheung Po-kin (張寶堅); 8 October 1934; Guangzhou, Guangdong, China
- Died: 21 February 2022 (aged 87); Hong Kong
- Other names: Cheung Bo-Kin, Chi Yau, Chin Yu, Cho Yuan, Choh Yuen, Chu Yuan, Chun Yue, Yuan Cho
- Occupations: Film director; screenwriter; actor
- Years active: 1954–2004
- Spouse: Nam Hung (1967–2022)
- Parent: Cheung Wood-yau
- Awards: Hong Kong Film Awards – Professional Spirit Award; 1998; Hong Kong Film Awards – Lifetime Achievement Award; 2018

Chinese name
- Chinese: 楚原
Transcriptions
Standard Mandarin
- Hanyu Pinyin: Chǔ Yuán
Yue: Cantonese
- Jyutping: Co2 Jyun4

Chor Yuen (Chinese: 楚原), born Cheung Po-kin (張寶堅; 8 October 1934 – 21 February 2022), was a Hong Kong film director, screenwriter, and actor. Chor is credited with over 120 films as director, over 70 films as a writer and over 40 films as an actor.

== Early life and education ==
Chor was born in Guangzhou, Guangdong, on 8 October 1934. He studied Chemistry at Sun Yat-sen University in Guangzhou, China.

== Career ==
In 1954, Chor started his acting career. Chor first appeared in Madam Yun, a 1954 historical drama film directed by Ng Wui. In 1956, Chor became a screenwriter. Chor first wrote Flower Petals in the Wind (a.k.a. Petals in the Wind, A Flower Petal in the Wind), a 1956 drama film directed by Ng Wui. In 1957, Chor became a director with Kong Ngee Co., a Singapore film company that produced Cantonese films. Chor co-directed his first two films with Chun Kim. Chor co-directed Bloodshed in the Valley of Love, a 1957 Cantonese martial arts film. Chor also co-directed The Whispering Palm (a.k.a. Moon over Malaya), a 1957 Cantonese drama. In 1959, Chor directed Grass by the Lake (a.k.a. The Natural Son). During the 1960s, Chor directed several films for independent production companies including Lan Kwong Film Company, founded by producer Wong Cheuk-hon.. Chor is credited with over 120 films as director, over 70 films as writer and over 40 films as actor.

Chor was also known for beautiful set designs of his martial arts films.

== Personal life and death ==
Chor was married to Nam Hung, an actress. He died on 21 February 2022, at the age of 87.

== Filmography ==
=== As director ===
- 1957 Bloodshed in the Valley of Love (a.k.a. Blood Valley, Blood Stains the Valley of Love) - Co-director.
- 1957 The Whispering Palm (a.k.a. Moon Over Malaya) - Co-director.
- 1957 Murder on the Beach - Co-director.
- 1959 Grass by the Lake - Director.
- 1959 Orchid in the Storm (a.k.a. Twilight of Love) - Director.
- 1960 Autumn Leaves (a.k.a. Autumn Leaf) - Director, writer.
- 1960 The Great Devotion (a.k.a. Love Cannot Read) - Kwok-Hung. Also Director, screenwriter.
- 1961 Forever Beloved - Director.
- 1961 The Psycho (a.k.a. Ghost That Was Not) - Director.
- 1962 Eternal Regret, Part 1 (a.k.a. A Man's Betrayal, Part One) - Director.
- 1962 True Love - Director.
- 1962 Eternal Regret, Part 2 (a.k.a. A Man's Betrayal, Part Two) - Director.
- 1962 A Time for Mourning - Director.
- 1963 My Only Love - Director.
- 1963 Tear-Laden Rose - Director.
- 1963 In My Dream Last Night - Director.
- 1964 Too High to Touch - Director.
- 1964 Diary of a Chauvinistic Husband - Director.
- 1964 A Deadly Night - Director.
- 1964 A Secluded Orchid - Director.
- 1964 A Blundering Wife - Director.
- 1964 Their Lost Romance - Director.
- 1964 Diary of a Chauvinistic Husband, Part 2 - Director.
- 1964 All Are Happy (a.k.a. Happiness Reigns Everywhere) - Co-director.
- 1965 Silent Love - Director.
- 1965 Lover in Disguise - Director.
- 1965 The Sinner - Director.
- 1965 The Sinner, Part 2 - Director.
- 1965 Honeymoon - Director.
- 1965 Secrets of a Husband - Director.
- 1965 Remorse - Director.
- 1965 Love Never Fades - Director.
- 1965 Love Has Many Faces - Director.
- 1965 Boundless Love (a.k.a. Love Cage, Lost in Love) - Director.
- 1965 A Good Match (a.k.a. An Ocean of Love) - Director, screenwriter.
- 1965 The Black Rose (a.k.a. Black Rose) - Director.
- 1965 Doomed Love - Director.
- 1966 Running Tears - Director.
- 1966 Legacy - Director.
- 1966 Spy with My Face - Director. Sequel to The Black Rose.
- 1966 The Thief with baby Face - Director.
- 1966 Violet Girl - Director.
- 1966 Little Foursome Family - Director.
- 1966 Affection - Director.
- 1966 How Much Worry You Can Have - Director.
- 1966 A Fatal Adventure - Director.
- 1967 Maiden Thief (a.k.a. The Wonder Thief, The Precious Mirror) - Director.
- 1967 Man from Interpol - Director.
- 1967 Revenger (a.k.a. Story of a Brave Soul) - Director.
- 1967 To Rose with Love - Director.
- 1970 Cold Blade - Director, screenwriter.
- 1972 The Killer - Director.
- 1972 Intimate Confessions of a Chinese Courtesan (Chinese: 愛奴) - Director.
- 1973 The Bastard (a.k.a. Little Hero, The Little Illegitimate, Nobody's Son) - Director.
- 1973 Haze in the Sunset - Director.
- 1973 The House of 72 Tenants - Thief in the market. Also Director, screenwriter.
- 1973 The Villains - Director.
- 1974 Sex, Love and Hate - Director.
- 1976 Killer Clans - Director.
- 1976 The Magic Blade - Director.
- 1976 The Web of Death - Director.
- 1977 The Jade Tiger - Director.
- 1977 Sentimental Swordsman - Director.
- 1977 Clans of Intrigue - Director.
- 1977 Death Duel - Director.
- 1978 Swordsman and Enchantress - Director.
- 1978 Legend of the Bat - Director.
- 1978 Clan of Amazons - Director.
- 1978 Heaven Sword and Dragon Sabre - Director.
- 1979 Full Moon Scimitar - Director.
- 1979 The Proud Twins - Director.
- 1980 Bat Without Wings - Director.
- 1980 Heroes Shed No Tears - Director, screenwriter.
- 1981 Return of the Sentimental Swordsman - Director, screenwriter.
- 1981 Emperor and His Brother - Director.
- 1981 The Duel of the Century - Director.
- 1982 Perils of the Sentimental Swordsman - Director.
- 1982 The Spirit of the Sword - Director.
- 1983 The Enchantress - Director.
- 1983 The Roving Swordsman - Director.
- 1983 Mad, Mad 83 - Director.
- 1983 Descendant of the Sun - Director.
- 1984 The Hidden Power of the Dragon Sabre - Director.
- 1984 Lust for Love of a Chinese Courtesan - Director.
- 1986 Last Song in Paris - Director, screenwriter.
- 1987 That Enchanting Night
- 1988 The Diary of a Big Man
- 1990 Sleazy Dizzy
- 1990 The Legend of Lee Heung Kwan
- 1990 Blood-Stained Tradewinds

=== As actor ===
- Madam Yun (a.k.a. Madam Wan, Six Chapters of a Floating Life) - Actor. Film debut. (1954)
- Police Story (1985)
- The Seventh Curse (1986)
- Police Story 2 (1988)
- Miracles (1989)
- The Banquet (1991)
- Twin Dragons (1992)
- He Ain't Heavy, He's My Father (1993)
- Thunderbolt (1995) - Uncle Tung / Foh's father
- Those Were the Days (1997)

=== Television series ===
- Family Squad (1991)
- A Kindred Spirit (1995)
- File of Justice IV (1995)
- Journey to the West (1996)
- File of Justice V (1997)
- Triumph Over Evil (1997)
- Journey to the West II (1998)
- Armed Reaction (1998)
- War of the Genders (2000)
- Armed Reaction II (2000)
- The Legendary Four Aces (2000)
- Armed Reaction III (2001)
- A Step into the Past (2001)
- Armed Reaction IV (2004)

== Awards ==
- 2018 Lifetime Achievement Award. Presented at 37th Hong Kong Film Awards in Hong Kong. April 15, 2018.
