= The Romantic Swordsman =

The Romantic Swordsman may refer to:

- Sentimental Swordsman, Ruthless Sword, a novel from the Xiaoli Feidao Series by Gu Long. Its Chinese title is Duoqing Jianke Wuqing Jian.
- Xiaoli Feidao (小李飛刀; Little Li Flying Dagger), the weapon of the novels' protagonists. Xiaoli Feidao is also sometimes used as a title for film and television adaptations of the novel.
- Films:
  - The Romantic Swordsman (1977 film) (多情劍客無情劍), a 1977 Hong Kong film
  - The Romantic Swordsman (1984 film) (小李飛刀), a 1984 Hong Kong film
  - Xiaoli Feidao Zhi Feidao Waizhuan (小李飛刀之飛刀外傳), a 2000 Hong Kong film
- Television series:
  - The Romantic Swordsman (1978 TV series) (小李飛刀), a 1978 Hong Kong television series
  - Xiaoli Feidao (1982 TV series) (小李飛刀), a 1982 Taiwanese television series
  - Duoqing Jianke Wuqing Jian (1993 TV series) (多情劍客無情劍), a 1993 Chinese television series
  - The Romantic Swordsman (1995 TV series) (小李飛刀), a 1995 Hong Kong television series
  - Legend of Dagger Li (小李飛刀), a 1999 Chinese television series
  - Xiaoli Feidao (2008 TV series) (小李飛刀), a 2008 Chinese television series
