= Han Xue (actress) =

Chinese singer and actress

- 韩雪
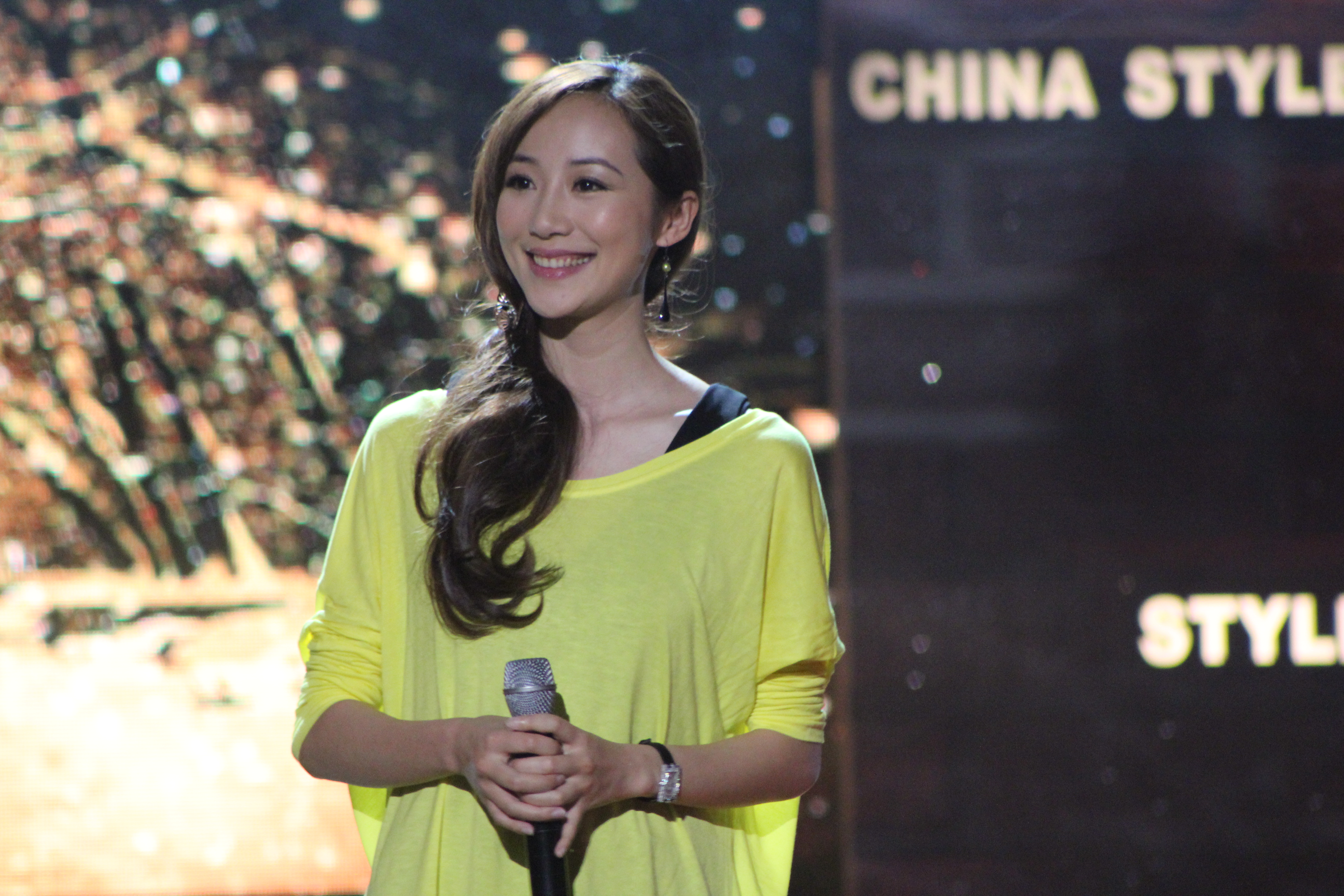
- Han performed on Hubei Television on 18 April 2012
- Born: 11 January 1983 (age 43); Suzhou, Jiangsu, China
- Other names: Cecilia Han; Xue Xiaoning
- Education: Shanghai Theatre Academy
- Occupations: Singer; actress
- Years active: 2001–present
- Agent: Han Xue Studio
- Relatives: Han Shu (grandfather)
- Musical career
- Genres: Mandopop
- Labels: Sony Music Entertainment (2001–2008); Universal Music Group (2009–2012); Gold Typhoon (April 2012–present)

Chinese name
- Traditional Chinese: 韓雪
- Simplified Chinese: 韩雪
Transcriptions
Standard Mandarin
- Hanyu Pinyin: Hán Xuě
- Website: hanxue.com.cn

Han Xue (born 11 January 1983), also known as Cecilia Han, is a Chinese singer and actress of Miao ethnicity.

Han is noted for her roles as Baigujing and Diaochan in the television series Journey to the West and Cao Cao respectively.

== Early life and education ==
Han was born in a military family in Suzhou, Jiangsu, her grandfather Han Shu was a general of the People's Liberation Army, he participated in the Second Sino-Japanese War and Korean War. Her grandmother was once the leading lady in the Chinese People's Liberation Army Naval Song and Dance Troupe, her aunt Han Mei is a noted musician in Canada. At the age of 6, Han studied singing with the Suzhou City Choir. Her secondary education was at Suzhou No.1 Middle School. Han graduated from Shanghai Theatre Academy.

== Career ==
During her university period, Han began working on her debut solo album under Sony Music Entertainment. The album's lead single, "Falling Snow", was released on 15 October 2004, it's a cover of Mika Nakashima. That same year, she starred with Aaron Kwok and Cecilia Cheung in Jingle Ma's Para Para Sakura.

In 2003, Han starred in the wuxia television series Flying Daggers, adapted from Gu Long's novel Feidao Youjian Feidao of the Xiaoli Feidao Series.

In 2004, Han starred as Zhantai Mingjing in the wuxia television series Heroic Legend, based on the novel by the same name by Liang Yusheng. That same year, she also starred in the horror film Don't Enter the Deserted House, and comedy drama series Good Luck Zhu Bajie as Princess Iron Fan.

Her second album, titled Summer Love, was released on 27 March 2006. The same year, she was cast in The Little Fairy, a historical romance television series starring Hu Ge and Ariel Lin, she received positive reviews.

Her third album, titled A Journey Into Fantasy, was released on 31 October 2007. Forbes China Celebrity 100 named Han on their list of the 100 Chinese celebrities. The same year, she played the lead role in Strange Stories from a Chinese Studio 2, a television series adaptation based on the novel of the same name by Pu Songling. She also starred as the female lead in the period romance drama A Love Before Gone With Wind.

In 2008, Han sang the song Beijing, Beijing, I Love Beijing with Rain, Kelly Chen, Tan Jing, and Aaron Kwok for the 2008 Beijing Olympic Games. Then she starred in the romance drama A Mobile Love Story alongside Wallace Huo.

Her fifth album, titled My Song for You, was released on 18 May 2009 by Universal Music Group.

On 30 June 2010, Huayi Brothers released her 6th album Flower in Heart. The same year, she became well known for her role as Baigujing in hit TV drama Journey to the West, the series reached number one in the ratings when it aired in China.

Her seventh album, titled They Said, was released 15 August 2012 by Gold Typhoon.

In 2013, Han starred in the historical television series Cao Cao directed by Hu Mei, playing the role of Diaochan. The same year, she starred in the biographical series Ip Man, portraying Ip Man's love interest.

In 2015, Han starred in the historical film Cairo Declaration. The same year, she appeared in the shenmo television series Strange Stories from a Chinese Studio 4.

In 2016, Han starred as the lead in the horror film The Golden Doll.

In 2017, Han starred in the fantasy drama Lost Love in Times.

In 2019, Han was cast in the political drama People's Justice as a prosecutor, the sequel to the hit drama In the Name of the People.

== Filmography ==
=== Film ===
Year	English title	Chinese title	Role	Ref.
2000		庭院里的女人		
2001	Para Para Sakura	浪漫樱花	Ke Ke	
2004	Don't Enter the Deserted House	荒宅勿入	Wang Jiaoluan/ Wang Jiaofeng	
2011	Deadly Will	囧探佳人	Lin Lin	
2013	Dating Fever	我为相亲狂	Bai Jingjing	
2015	Follow Me My Queen	女神跟我走	Coco	
2015	Cairo Declaration	开罗宣言	Edo Eiko	
2016	The Golden Doll	古曼	Xiao Wen	
2020	Pre-martial Check	婚前检查		
2022	Flashover	惊天救援	Zhang Hong	

=== Television series ===
Year	English title	Chinese title	Role	Ref.
2001		南北一家亲	Zhu Xiaoxin	
2003	The Raging Butterfly	愤怒的蝴蝶	Dadao Jizi	
2003	Flying Daggers	飞刀又见飞刀	Leng Xiaoxing	
2004	Heroic Legend	萍踪侠影	Zhantai Jingming	
2004	Good Luck Zhu Bajie	福星高照猪八戒	Princess Iron Fan	
2004	Dream Factory	梦工厂	Ye Xiaoyu	
2004		大宋碑歌	Fang Yu'er	
2005		汉城之恋	Li Ruonong	
2005		错爱一生	Chen Xiangnan	
2005		婚姻的敌人	Xu Diandian	
2005	Happy Zhu Bajie	喜气洋洋猪八戒	Xiang Si	
2006	The Little Fairy	天外飞仙	Xiang Xuehai	
2006	The Blind Detective	盲侠金鱼飞天猪	Duan Xueyu	
2006		阿诗玛新传	A'shima	
2006		窗外有张脸	Li Xue/ Li Bing	
2006	Tomorrow I Am Not Lamb	明天我不是羔羊	Shi Qiuguo	
2007	Strange Stories from a Chinese Studio 2	聊斋2	Yanzhi	
2007	A Love Before Gone With Wind	北平往事	Kuang Meijiao	
2008	Loath at Home	不想回家	Bai Yun	
2008	A Mobile Love Story	爱情占线	Mu Beibei	
2008		画之缘	Gu Xiaoxue	
2008	Deep Affection Life	浓情一生	Ai Qing	
2009	Deep Love	热爱	Shen Hanqiu	
2009	Underground	地下地上	Lin Jing	
2010	The Sharp Sword	利剑	Wang Hanmei	
2010	Journey to the West	西游记	Baigujing	
2010	Nanjing Decisive Battle	决战南京	Yang Ziyue	
2010	Foolish Love	娱乐没有圈	Lin Manyi	
2011	Peak Times	巅峰时代	Bai Ruoqing	
2012	Come Home	亲爱的回家	Cheng Hua	
2012	Fall in Love with You	偏偏爱上你	Tong Xin	
2012	Code Thirteen	代号十三钗	Li Fenghuang	
2013	Woman's Weapon	女人的武器	Lin Jiu'ni	
2013	Ip Man	叶问	Zhang Yongcheng	
2013	Cao Cao	曹操	Diaochan	
2014	Lady's House	淑女之家	Zhou Jin	
2015	I Have A Dream	共和国工人之我有一个梦	Ye Chun'er	
2015	Dash Out of the Moon Island	冲出月亮岛	Su Jing	
2015	Strange Stories from a Chinese Studio 4	聊斋4	Xie Ling'er	
2015	The Waves	巨浪	Gao Haiwei	
2016	War Flowers	乱世丽人行	Han Shuying	
2016		萌夫木子李	Ouyang Zhiwei	
2017	Stairway to Stardom	逆袭之星途璀璨	Duan Lingwei	
2017	Lost Love in Times	醉玲珑	Tao Yao	
2017		婚姻历险记	Jiang Li	
2018		秘密航线	Feng Yaqin	
2020	Heroes in Harm’s Way	最美逆行者		
TBA	People's Justice	人民的正义	Luo Xinran	

== Discography ==
=== Studio album ===
#	English title	Chinese title	Released	Label	Ref.
1st	Falling Snow	飘雪	15 October 2004	Sony Music Entertainment	
2nd	Summer Love	夏·恋情	27 March 2006	Sony Music Entertainment	
3rd	A Journey Into Fantasy (Chinese)	狂想的旅程 中文版	31 October 2007	Sony Music Entertainment	
4th	A Journey Into Fantasy (Japanese)	狂想的旅程 日文版	21 November 2007	Sony Music Entertainment	
5th	My Song for You	为你写的歌	18 May 2009	Universal Music Group	
6th	Flower in Heart	心中的花	30 June 2010	Huayi Brothers	
7th	They Said	他们说	15 August 2012	Gold Typhoon	

=== Music video appearances ===
Year	English title	Chinese title	Singer	Ref.
June 2001	Para Para Sakura	—N/a	Aaron Kwok	
July 2002	Story	故事	Man Wenjun	
January 2003	Confession	告白	Lu Yi	
August 2006	Finally	—N/a	Wang Leehom	
October 2006	Last Forever	记忆	Kousuke Atari, herself	
July 2009	Our Holiday	共同的节日	Luo Zhongxu, herself	
August 2012	Cheer for Yourself	为自己加油	group star	

== Awards and nominations ==
Year	Award	Category	Nominated work	Result	Ref.
2005	ERC Chinese Top Ten Awards	Best New Singer: Silver	Falling Snow	Won	
2006	CCTV Music Awards	Most Promising Singer	Summer Love	Won	
2007	ERC Chinese Top Ten Awards	Best Stage Singer	Summer Love	Won	
2007	ERC Chinese Top Ten Awards	Top 10 Songs	"Ding Zhu Feng"	Won	
2008	ERC Chinese Top Ten Awards	Top 10 Songs	"Da Ya Gui"	Won	
2012	Beijing Pop Music Awards	Favorite Female Singer	—N/a	Nominated	
2012	Beijing Pop Music Awards	Style Breakthrough Award	They Said	Won	
2012	Beijing Pop Music Awards	Best Songs	Tan Hua	Won	
2019	6th The Actors of China Award Ceremony	Best Actress (Sapphire Category)	Mi Mi Hang Xian	Nominated	
