= The Deadly Duo =

1971 Hong Kong film by Chang Cheh

- Film poster
- 雙俠
- Directed by: Chang Cheh
- Written by: Ni Kuang
- Produced by: Run Run Shaw
- Starring: David Chiang; Ti Lung
- Cinematography: Kung Mu-to
- Edited by: Kwok Ting-hung
- Music by: Frankie Chan
- Production company: Shaw Brothers Studio
- Distributed by: Shaw Brothers Studio
- Release date: 22 December 1971
- Running time: 77 minutes
- Country: Hong Kong
- Language: Mandarin

The Deadly Duo (雙俠) is a 1971 Hong Kong wuxia film directed by Chang Cheh, starring David Chiang and Ti Lung.

== Synopsis ==
The film is set in 12th-century China during the Song dynasty. Many martial artists in the jianghu look up to Prince Kang, whom they believe would be the best person to rule the Song Empire. Upon learning that Prince Kang is being held hostage in the Jin Empire, Bao Tingtian, a well-known martial artist, organises a group of heroes to stage a rescue.

Around the same time, Wan Tiankui, a formidable martial artist, has led his followers to pledge allegiance to the Jin Empire. They would stand in the heroes' way.

Upon learning of where Prince Kang is, the heroes turn to Yan Lüren, who is known for his prowess in qinggong, to help them because there is a broken bridge that they cannot pass. Unknown to them, Yan Lüren is collaborating with the Jin Empire. However, they meet Yan Lüren's junior, Bian Fu, who kills his senior and joins the heroes in their quest.

== Cast ==
- David Chiang as Bian Fu
- Ti Lung as Bao Tingtian
- Ku Feng as Wan Tiankui
- Wong Chung as Gao Xun
- Chan Sing as the Jin crown prince
- Stanley Fung as Yan Lüren
- Bruce Tong as Rong Yi
- Wang Kuang-yu as Rong Fu
- Cheng Lui as Hero Xu
- Jin Bong-jin as Hero Zheng
- Lau Gong as Hero Ma
- Lau Dan as Hero Chao
- Yeung Chak-lam as Thunder Fire
- Bolo Yeung as River Dragon
- Wong Pau-gei as Leopard
- Lau Kar-wing as Mole
- Chan Chuen as Yin Tiansi
- Yau Lung as Prince Kang

== Production ==
The film is one of many Hong Kong wuxia films from the early 1970s directed by Chang Cheh and starring Ti Lung and David Chiang. The films include The Heroic Ones, New One-Armed Swordsman, and Blood Brothers. The Deadly Duo is considerably shorter than the others, and arguably with less emphasis in the way of characterisation and plotting and more in the way of fighting, action, and adventure.

All the fights involve various weapons, mostly spears and swords, but also some exotic devices such as a pair of cymbals and a device that fires incendiary balls. The co-director of the action scenes was Lau Kar-leung, who had an interest in spear and stick fighting and went on to direct more martial arts films in the 1970s and 1980s.
