= Ti Lung =

Hong Kong actor and martial artist (b. 1946)

- 狄龍
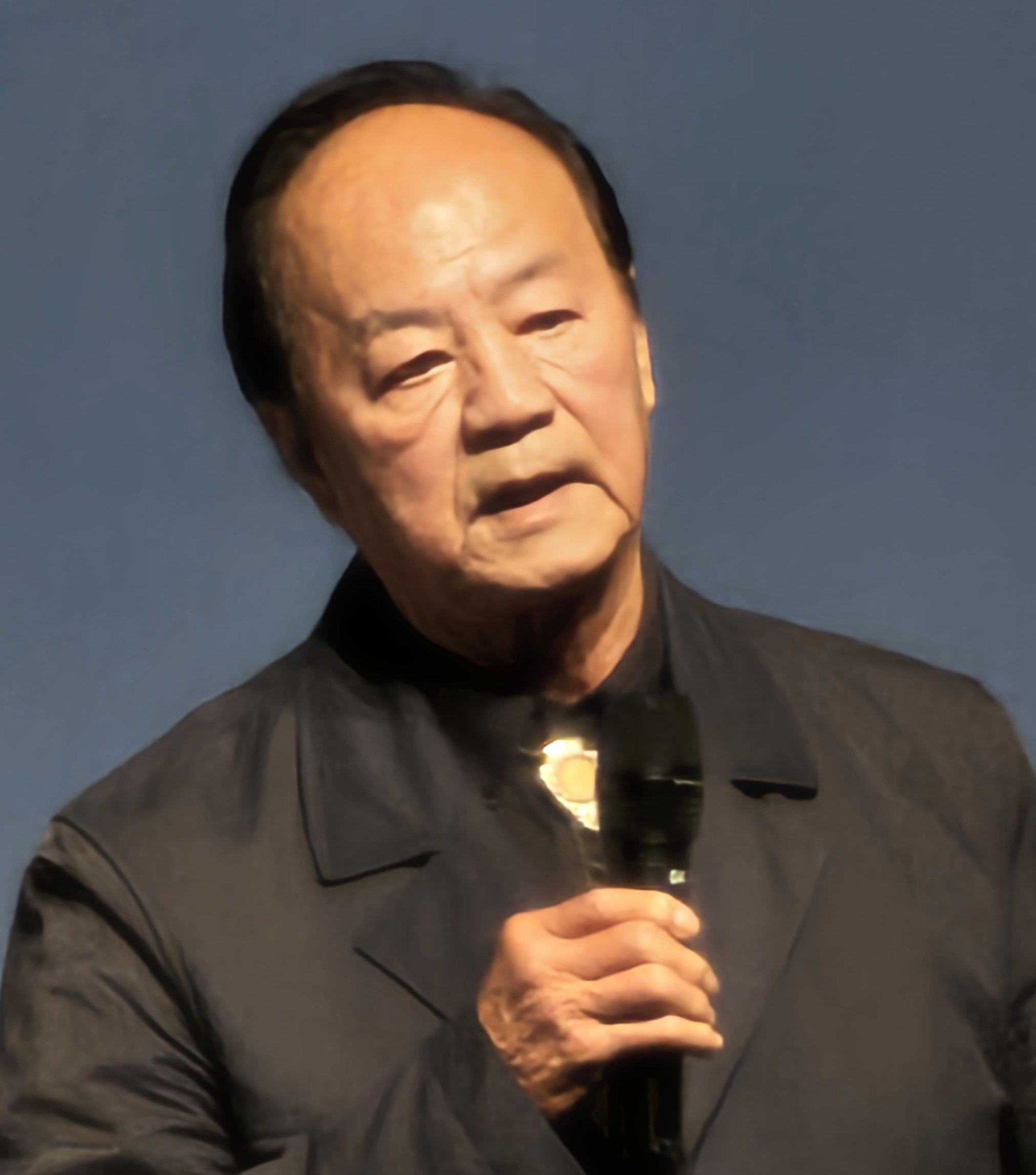
- Ti in 2026
- Born: Tam Fu-wing; 19 August 1946 (age 80); Xinhui, Jiangmen, China
- Other names: Tommy Tam; Tik Lung; Tik Long; Ti Lung
- Occupation: Actor
- Years active: 1969–present
- Spouse: Tao Man-Ming (m. 1975)
- Children: 1
- Relatives: Jerry Lamb (nephew); Jan Lamb (nephew)

Chinese name
- Traditional Chinese: 狄龍
- Simplified Chinese: 狄龙
Transcriptions
Standard Mandarin
- Hanyu Pinyin: Dí Lóng
Yue: Cantonese
- Jyutping: Dik^{6} Lung^{4}

Tam Fu-Wing
- Traditional Chinese: 譚富榮
- Simplified Chinese: 谭富荣
Transcriptions
Standard Mandarin
- Hanyu Pinyin: Tán Fùróng
Yue: Cantonese
- Jyutping: Taam^{4} Fu^{3}-wing^{4}

Thomas Tam Fu-wing (Chinese: 譚富榮, born 19 August 1946), known by his stage name Ti Lung (狄龍), is a Hong Kong actor and martial artist. He emerged in the 1970s as a star of Shaw Brothers Studio wuxia films, particularly The Duel, The Blood Brothers, Clans of Intrigue, The Avenging Eagle, The Sentimental Swordsman and its sequel. He is also known for starring in the classic John Woo film A Better Tomorrow and its sequel. He is a Hong Kong Film Award, Golden Horse Award, and Golden Bauhinia Award winner.

== Early life ==
Ti was born as Tam Fu-wing (譚富榮) in the Xinhui county of Jiangmen, Guangdong, China into a family with 4 members including himself, his parents and a younger sister. His whole family moved to Hong Kong shortly after the end of the Chinese Civil War, when he was four-years-old.

He was educated at the Eton College in Hong Kong. However, after his father's death, he had to terminate his studies at the age of 11 in order to support his family. Initially, he worked as a delivery boy at a grocery store where he often delivered milk, newspapers and groceries. At 17, he trained as a tailor and studied Wing Chun in order to protect himself against street gangs.

== Career ==
In 1968, after he graduated year 2 college, Ti responded to an advertisement placed by the Shaw Brothers and applied to the Shaw Acting Course. Upon graduation from the class, he was able to secure a minor role in Chang Cheh's Return of the One-Armed Swordsman starring Jimmy Wang Yu. He was given the stage name "Ti Lung" (譚富榮, "Ti" being a lucky name and "Lung" meaning dragon) by Shaw Brothers executive Mona Fong, because it sounded similar to Alain Delon (whom he greatly admired).

Chang immediately recognized his potential and offered him the lead role in his next production Dead End opposite Golden Chan Hung-lit, a role which would launch his career as one of the best known faces in classic Wuxia films. At that time, he continued to study Wing Chun under the martial arts master Jiu Wan who described him as having the advantages of a strong body, intelligence, speed, good footwork and a diligent work ethic. Jiu Wan granted Ti Lung a certificate upon completion of his martial arts training in Wing Chun, and Ti Lung subsequently learned other martial arts (and performance art skills) such as Judo, Muay Thai, Taekwondo, Wushu and horseback riding. Later on in his career, Ti Lung became a common face associated with David Chiang, Alexander Fu Sheng, Ku Feng, Chen Kuan-Tai, the Venom Mob and other major Shaw Bros stars at the time, often cast as a dashing, noble hero as well as a capable martial artist.

Ti Lung is also perhaps more known for his collaborations with the most revered of Shaw Studio directors - Chang Cheh - who turned him into a star along with fellow actor and frequent co-star David Chiang in over 20 films: Dead End (1969), Have Sword, Will Travel (1969), Vengeance (1970), The Heroic Ones (1970), The Duel (1971), Duel of Fists (1971), The Deadly Duo (1971), Angry Guest (1972), Four Riders (1972), The Blood Brothers (1973) and The Pirate (1973). Due to their successes, the trio eventually became known as "The Iron Triangle." During the early 1970s, one of Ti Lung's most notable feature films was The Blood Brothers (1973) which netted him The Special Award for Outstanding Performance at the 11th Golden Horse Awards in Taiwan and the Special Jury Award at the Asian Film Awards in 1973. Soon after, Ti Lung moved forward ins his career by teaming up with Lar Kar-Leung, Chu Yuan, Sun Chung and Tong Gai to produce movies still loved today such as The Magic Blade (1976), Clans of Intrigue (1977), The Sentimental Swordsman (1977), The Avenging Eagle (1978) and Shaolin Prince (1983).

The famous standard formula of wuxia movies produced by the Shaw Brothers took Chu Yuan as the director, Gu Long as the original playwright and Ti Lung as the hero. Chu Yuan directed more Gu Long movies than any other director did, and Ti Lung appeared in more Chu Yuan films than any other actor, including Clans of Intrigue in 1977, Legend of the Bat in 1978, The Magic Blade in 1976 and The Sentimental Swordsman in 1977. In 1979, he won a Best Actor Award at the 25th Asian Film Awards as Black Eagle Chik Ming-Sing in The Avenging Eagle in 1978.

After he left Shaw Brothers Studios in the 1980s, Ti Lung's career took a turn for the worse until 1986, when John Woo cast him opposite Chow Yun-fat in A Better Tomorrow for the role of a Triad member, Sung-Tse Ho. The movie was a massive box office success and placed Ti Lung squarely back in the public consciousness, although it changed his image from the handsome young martial artist to the tortured, would-be hero gangster. His role in the film also won him a Best Actor Award at the 23rd Golden Horse Awards in 1986. After that role, Ti Lung's next most recognizable appearance would be with Jackie Chan in Drunken Master II, in which he co-starred as Wong Kei-Ying, father of Chinese folk hero Wong Fei Hung. In 1994–95, Ti Lung lead-starred as Bao Zheng in a Hong Kong version of the Justice Pao TV series for TVB. At the time this series was playing on Hong Kong television, many fans in Mainland China and Hong Kong favorably compared Ti Lung/TVB's Bao Zheng with Jin Chao-chun/Mainland China's Bao Zheng. Ti Lung also worked with Andy Lau in Three Kingdoms: Resurrection of the Dragon as the legendary Guan Yu. From there, he has continued to steadily work in television in a variety of roles.

In 1999, Ti Lung experienced a comeback in movies by playing the role of Sir Lung in The Kid (1999), which enabled him to achieve a Best Supporting Actor award at the 19th Hong Kong Film Awards in 2000. In 2007, he received a Life Achievement Award at the Golden Bauhinia Awards. Until 2015, he played Master Lam in a Hong Kong and Malaysia feature film co-production, The Kid from the Big Apple. The role won him a Best Actor Award at the 7th Macau International Movie Festival. The sequel to the film is slated to premiere in Malaysia in November 2017.

== Personal life ==
Ti Lung married beauty queen and actress Tao Man Ming in 1975. In 1980, Tao gave birth to a son, Shaun Tam Chun-yin (譚俊彦). He is also the uncle of singers Jerry Lamb and Jan Lamb.

== Filmography ==
=== Film ===
| Year | Title | Role | Notes/Ref. |
|---|---|---|---|
| 1969 | Return of the One-Armed Swordsman (獨臂刀王) | Lu Hong | |
| 1969 | Dead End (死角) | Zhang Chun | |
| 1969 | Have Sword, Will Travel (保鏢) | Siang | |
| 1970 | Vengeance! (報仇) | Guan Yulou | |
| 1970 | The Heroic Ones (十三太保) | Shi Jingsi | |
| 1970 | The Singing Killer (小煞星) | musician | cameo |
| 1971 | King Eagle (鷹王) | Jin Fei | |
| 1971 | The New One-Armed Swordsman (新獨臂刀) | Feng Junjie | |
| 1971 | The Duel (大決鬥) | Tang Renjie | |
| 1971 | The Anonymous Heroes (無名英雄) | Tie Hu | |
| 1971 | Duel of Fists (拳擊) | Wen Lie | |
| 1971 | Deadly Duo (雙俠) | Bao Tingtian | |
| 1972 | Angry Guest (惡客) | Wen Lieh | |
| 1972 | The Water Margin (水滸傳) | Wu Song | |
| 1972 | Trilogy of Swordsmanship (群英會) | Xu Shiying | Segment 3: "White Water Strand" (白水灘) |
| 1972 | Young People (年輕人) | Lam Tat | |
| 1972 | The Delightful Forest (快活林) | Wu Song | |
| 1972 | Four Riders (四騎士) | Feng Xia | |
| 1973 | The Blood Brothers (刺馬) | Ma Xinyi | |
| 1973 | The Generation Gap (叛逆) | Ling Zhao | |
| 1973 | The Pirate (大海盜) | Cheung Po Tsai | |
| 1974 | The Drug Addict (吸毒者) | Kuan Cheng-chun | |
| 1974 | Shatter | Tai Pah | |
| 1974 | Five Shaolin Masters (少林五祖) | Tsai Te-chung | |
| 1974 | The Two Faces of Love (小孩與狗) | | |
| 1974 | The Savage Five (五虎將) | Fang Yi-fei | |
| 1974 | Es knallt - und die Engel singen | Slim Chu Love | as Long Tin |
| 1974 | Young Lovers on Flying Wheels (電單車) | Song Da | Also director |
| 1975 | The Young Rebel | Gen Lai | Also writer and director |
| 1975 | All Men Are Brothers | Wu Song | |
| 1975 | Black Magic | Xu Nuo | |
| 1975 | The Empress Dowager | Emperor Guangxu | |
| 1976 | The Last Tempest | Emperor Guangxu | |
| 1976 | 7-Man Army | Battalion Commander Wu Chaozheng | |
| 1976 | Shaolin Temple | Cai De-zhong | |
| 1976 | The Snake Prince | Snake Prince | |
| 1976 | Black Magic Part 2 | Qi Zhong-ping | |
| 1976 | The Magic Blade | Fu Hung-hsueh | |
| 1977 | Clans of Intrigue | Chu Liuxiang | |
| 1977 | Pursuit Of Vengeance | Fu Hung-Hsueh | |
| 1977 | Death Duel | Fu Hung-Hsueh | |
| 1977 | The Flying Guillotine 2 | Ma Tang | |
| 1977 | Inheritor of Kung Fu | | |
| 1977 | The Jade Tiger | Zhao Wuji | |
| 1977 | The Naval Commandos | Captain Liang Guan-qin | |
| 1977 | The Sentimental Swordsman | Li Xunhuan | |
| 1977 | The Brave Archer | Duan Zhixing | |
| 1978 | The Avenging Eagle | Black Eagle Chik Ming-sing | |
| 1978 | Legend of the Bat | Chu Liuxiang | |
| 1978 | Soul of the Sword | Nameless | |
| 1978 | Swordsman and Enchantress | Mr. Xiao | |
| 1979 | The Deadly Breaking Sword | Tuan Changqing | |
| 1979 | The Kung Fu Instructor | Wang Yang | |
| 1979 | Ten Tigers from Kwangtung | Lai Yan-chiu | |
| 1980 | The Convict Killer | Teng Piao/Iron Chain | |
| 1980 | The Heroes | Ko Fei / Wong Fei | |
| 1980 | Return of the Sentimental Swordsman | Li Xunhuan | |
| 1981 | The Brave Archer 3 | Duan Zhixing | |
| 1981 | Emperor and His Brother | Chen Chia-lo | |
| 1982 | Clan Feuds | Tie Zhong-tang | |
| 1982 | Shaolin Prince | Dao Xing | |
| 1982 | Tiger Killer | Wu Song | |
| 1982 | Perils of the Sentimental Swordsman | Chu Liuxiang | |
| 1982 | Mercenaries from Hong Kong | Luo Yi | |
| 1983 | The Hidden Power of the Dragon Sabre | General Tieh Zhen | |
| 1983 | Roving Swordsman | Shen Sheng-yi | |
| 1984 | A Friend from Inner Space | Joe Weng | |
| 1984 | Destiny's Champion | Benson Zhang | |
| 1984 | Ninja in the Deadly Trap | | |
| 1984 | Death Ring | | |
| 1984 | Shanghai 13 | Dock boss | |
| 1984 | Opium and the Kung-Fu Master | Tie Qiao San | |
| 1985 | The Master Strikes Back | Instructor Tong Tie-zheng | |
| 1986 | A Better Tomorrow | Sung Chi-ho | |
| 1986 | True Colours | Ho Lung | |
| 1986 | The Kinemn Bombs | | |
| 1987 | A Better Tomorrow 2 | Sung Chi-ho | |
| 1987 | The Legend of Wisley | Pak Kei-wai | |
| 1987 | May Jane | Commander | |
| 1987 | People's Hero | Sunny Koo | |
| 1988 | City War | Ken Chow | |
| 1988 | Tiger on Beat | Lung | |
| 1988 | Law or Justice? | Long Fei | |
| 1988 | Love Me Dad | Ken Chang | |
| 1989 | Just Heroes | Lung | Cameo |
| 1989 | Run, Don't Walk | Luk Pui | |
| 1990 | The Killer's Blues | Wai Yi-ming | |
| 1991 | The Banquet | Chef | Cameo |
| 1993 | Blade of Fury | Tan Si-tung / Chong Fei | |
| 1993 | First Shot | Wong Yat Chung | |
| 1993 | A Warrior's Tragedy | Fu Hung-suet | |
| 1993 | The Bare-Footed Kid | Tuen Ching-wan | |
| 1994 | Drunken Master II | Wong Kei-ying | |
| 1999 | The Kid | Sir Lung | |
| 2000 | Clean My Name, Mr. Coroner! | Officer CK Lau | |
| 2000 | High K | Zeng | |
| 2000 | Paramount Motel | Master Sun | |
| 2001 | Mist in Judge | Fung Ka-wai | |
| 2002 | Frugal Game | Delon | |
| 2003 | Star Runner | Brother Lung | |
| 2003 | Gray | | |
| 2005 | New Born, Living Strong! | | |
| 2006 | Heavenly Mission | Cho Hung | |
| 2006 | My Wife Is a Gangster 3 | Boss Lam | |
| 2006 | One Last Dance | Captain | |
| 2008 | Run Papa Run | Mabel's dad | |
| 2008 | Three Kingdoms: Resurrection of the Dragon | Guan Yu | |
| 2008 | The Butterfly Lovers | Zhu Gongyuan | |
| 2010 | The Jade and the Pearl | King | |
| 2010 | The Warrior's Way | Saddest Flute | |
| 2010 | Frozen | San | |
| 2013 | 7 Assassins | Prefect Cheuk | |
| 2015 | All You Need Is Love | Old Captain | |
| 2015 | The Kid from the Big Apple | Master Lin (Lin Chun Gen) | |
| 2017 | The Kid from the Big Apple 2: Before we forget | Lin Chun Gen | |
| 2018 | Staycation (一家大晒) | | |
| 2019 | Mermaid in the Sea | | |

=== Television ===
| Year | Network | Title | Role | Notes |
|---|---|---|---|---|
| 1995 | TVB | Justice Pao (包青天) | Baau Cing | |
| 1996 | TVB | ICAC Investigators 1996 (廉政行動1996) | Cheung Tin-yam | |
| 1998 | TVB | ICAC Investigators 1998 (廉政行動1998) | Cheung Tin-yam | |
| 2003 | Hunan TV | My Fair Princess III (還珠格格3之天上人間) | Qianlong Emperor | |
| 2004 | | Trail of the Everlasting Hero (俠影仙蹤) | Wang Xizhi | |
| 2004 | | Warriors of the Yang Clan (楊門虎將) | Yang Ye | |
| 2010 | | Qin Xianglian (秦香蓮) | Bao Zheng | |
| 2010 | KBS | The Fugitive: Plan B (도망자 플랜 B) | General Wei | |
| 2011 | | Qin Xianglian | | |
| 2013 | | Team of Sword (刀子队) | | |

== Awards ==
| Years | Awards | Title | Role | Category | Ref. |
|---|---|---|---|---|---|
| 1973 | 11th Golden Horse Awards | The Blood Brothers | Ma Xinyi | The Special Award for Outstanding Performance | |
| 1973 | Asian Film Awards | The Blood Brothers | Ma Xinyi | Special Jury Award | |
| 1979 | 25th Asian Film Awards | The Avenging Eagle | Black Eagle Chik Ming-sing | Best Actor | |
| 1986 | 23rd Golden Horse Awards | A Better Tomorrow | Sung Chi-ho | Best Actor | |
| 2000 | 19th Hong Kong Film Awards | The Kid | Sir Lung | Best Supporting Actor | |
| 2007 | 12th Golden Bauhinia Awards | | | Life Achievement Award | |
| 2015 | 7th Golden Lotus Awards | The Kid from the Big Apple | Master Lin (Lin Chun Gen) | Best Actor | |
| 2017 | PIFFA (Profima International Film Festival and Awards) | | | Life Achievement Award | |
| 2025 | 8th Malaysia International Film Festival | | | Lifetime Achievement Award | |
