= Han Mei (musician) =

Chinese guzheng performer and scholar

Mei Han (simplified Chinese: 韩梅; traditional Chinese: 韓梅; pinyin: Hán Méi) is a Chinese-Canadian guzheng performer and scholar.

She was born into a military family in Beijing, the youngest of four children. Her father Han Shu came from Shanxi, and her mother, who is half Miao, came from Hunan. Her maternal grandfather was a scholar, calligrapher, and educator named Long Zhancen (龙湛岑, 1889–1969).

Han began playing the zheng at the age of eleven. She graduated with a degree in English from Beijing Workers' University (北京市职工大学), and performed for a time with the Beijing Comrades Song and Dance Troupe (北京战友歌舞团; full name: 北京军区政治部战友歌舞团), which is affiliated with the People's Liberation Army.

Han's primary instrument is the 21-string zheng, but she also plays zheng with 16, 23, and 26 strings, as well as the liuqin, a high pitched small lute. She performs in traditional, contemporary, and cross-cultural contexts. She studied guzheng with Zhang Yan (张燕, 1945–1996) and Gao Zicheng (高自成, 1918–2010). She has recorded with Paul Plimley, Orchid Ensemble and Randy Raine-Reusch and performs internationally with her Chinese instrumental quartet Red Chamber, which was established in 2005. With Red Chamber, she recorded two albums: Redgrass (2008), which combines Chinese music with elements of bluegrass, and Gathering (2014).

She holds a Ph.D. and two master's degrees in ethnomusicology: from the Musical Research Institute of the Chinese Arts Academy (中国艺术研究院音乐研究所) in Beijing (1995) and from the University of British Columbia (2000, 2014). She wrote the "Zheng" article for the second edition of the New Grove Dictionary of Music and Musicians (2001), and New Grove Dictionary of Musical Instruments.

Han lived for many years in Vancouver, British Columbia, Canada, with her husband Randy Raine-Reusch. She came to Vancouver in 1996 and met Raine-Reusch at the University of British Columbia in 1998, marrying him in 2001. She served as Visiting assistant professor at Kenyon College in Gambier, Ohio from 2013 to 2015, and is currently associate professor at Middle Tennessee State University near Nashville, Tennessee, and the founding director of MTSU's Center for Chinese Music and Culture (est. 2015).

She has recorded one solo album, entitled Outside the Wall (2005).

Han's niece (the daughter of her brother) is Cecilia Han (Chinese name: Han Xue, 韩雪; b. 1983), a Chinese film actress and pop singer who sang at the closing ceremony of the 2008 Olympic Games.

== Discography ==
=== As leader ===
- 2005 - Outside the Wall (Za)

==== With Red Chamber ====
- 2008 - Redgrass (Za)
- 2012 - The Rough Guide to the music of China (Rough Guides)
- 2014 - Gathering (Za)
- 2016 - Classical & Contemporary Chinese Music (ARC Music)

=== With Orchid Ensemble ===
- 2000 - Heartland
- 2004 - Road to Kashgar

=== With Paul Plimley ===
- 2006 - Ume: Improvisations for Zheng and Piano (Za)

=== With Randy Raine-Reusch ===
- 2001 - Distant Wind: New Directions For Chinese Zheng (Za)

=== With B.C. Chinese Music Ensemble ===
- 2013 - Bamboo Shoots in Spring (BCCMA)

=== As guest musician ===
- 2000 - Transplanted Purple Bamboo (Vancouver Chinese Ensemble)
- 2011 - Karakoram Highway (Akasha)
- 2011 - Vintage & Unique (John Reischman and the Jaybirds)
