= The Magic Blade =

1976 Hong Kong film by Chor Yuen

- Film poster
- Directed by: Chor Yuen
- Screenplay by: Ni Kuang; Sze To-on
- Story by: Gu Long
- Produced by: Runme Shaw
- Cinematography: Wong Chit; Chen Yung-yu
- Edited by: Chiang Hsing-lung
- Music by: Frankie Chan
- Production company: Shaw Brothers
- Release date: October 7, 1976 (Hong Kong)
- Country: Hong Kong
- Language: Mandarin

The Magic Blade (Chinese: 天涯·明月·刀) is a 1976 Hong Kong wuxia film directed by Chor Yuen. It starred Ti Lung, Lo Lieh and Ku Feng. It is one of the many films Chor Yuen adapted based on the martial arts novels by Gu Long.

The film was part of the brief revival of wuxia films in Hong Kong follow the downfall of the kung fu film craze in and outside Hong Kong. The film has been described by academic Stephen Teo and Richard James Havis as one of the best wuxia during this brief revival period for the genre.

== Cast ==
- Ti Lung as Fu Hung Hsueh
- Lo Lieh as Yen Nan Fei
- Ku Feng as Hsiao Chien

== Production ==
Chor Yuen joined Shaw Brothers Studio in 1971. The films he made were primarily films with period settings that were either martial arts films or Chinese opera films. The Magic Blade was one of the many films Teo made based on the martial arts novels of Gu Long. Chor Yuen adapted 17 works by the novelist. When asked why he adapted so many, Chor Yuen responded that he had to follow the market at the request of Shaw Brothers, since the film adaptations performed so well.

The film was shot in Shaw Brothers studios in Hong Kong.

== Release and reception ==
The Magic Blade was released in Hong Kong on October 7, 1976.

In the Hong Kong local film market, the crime film Jumping Ash (1976) was a hit, leading audiences to desire what academic Sangjoon Lee called "realistic and local-centered films" that were not being made by film companies like Shaw Brothers. Academic Stephen Teo said in his book Hong Kong Cinema: The Extra Dimensions (1997) that The Magic Blade had Yuen form a new style of martial arts films with The Magic Blade which Teo described as presenting "brilliant sword-fighting choreography combined with a lyrical, dreamlike mood" Teo expanded upon this in the book The Cinema of Hong Kong: History, Arts, Identity (2000) writing that along with Chor Yuen's other wuxia films like The Killer Clans (1976) and Jade Tiger (1977), his films of this period were "leaden with Gothic mysticism" and foreshadowed later wuxia that were part of the Hong Kong New Wave like Tsui Hark's The Butterfly Murders (1979) and Patrick Tam's The Sword (1980).

From retrospective reviews, both Richard James Havis of the South China Morning Post newspaper and Donald Guarisco of online film database AllMovie described it as one of the best of Chor Yuen's best adaptations Gu Long's novels. Guarisco went on to state the film's truly impressive elements was the artistry deployed from its storytelling, namely the stylized sets that lead credibility to the storyline and concluded that the film was "one of the gems of the Shaw Brothers catalog and a must for fans of martial arts and swordplay fare from the '70s."

Teo described The Magic Blade as being the best of the wuxia films during the brief resurgence of the genre in the 1970s. In 2010, both contemporary and former research officers and programmers of the Hong Kong Film Archive as well as the Director of the Hong Kong International Film Festival and the dean of School of Film & Television at the Hong Kong Academy for Performing Artssubmitted a list of the 100 Must-See Hong Kong Movies. The Magic Blade was included on the top 100 list.
