= Flying Daggers =

2003 Taiwanese wuxia television series

- DVD release cover
- 飛刀，又見飛刀
- Genre: Wuxia
- Based on: Feidao, Youjian Feidao by Gu Long
- Written by: Chen Lihua; Guan Zhanbo
- Directed by: Shen Xuebing; Gao Hong
- Starring: Julian Cheung; Ruby Lin; Dong Jie
- Opening theme: "Until Forever" (直到永遠) by Wang Feng
- Ending theme: "Sad Swing" (悲傷的秋千) by Hannah Kim
- Country of origin: Taiwan
- Original language: Mandarin
- No. of episodes: 43

Production
- Producers: Young Pei-pei; Wang Pengju
- Production location: China
- Cinematography: Bo Xiangyi
- Running time: ≈ 45 minutes per episode

Original release
- Network: CTV
- Release: 18 September 2003 – 2003

Flying Daggers (飛刀，又見飛刀) is a 2003 Taiwanese wuxia television series adapted from the novel Feidao Youjian Feidao of the Xiaoli Feidao Series by Gu Long. The series is produced by Young Pei-pei and starred Julian Cheung, Ruby Lin, and Dong Jie.

== Synopsis ==
Li Huai is the illegitimate son of Li Manqing and the grandson of the legendary "Little Li Flying Dagger" Li Xunhuan. When he eventually meets his father for the first time, their reunion is an unhappy one as his stepmother and stepbrother refuse to accept him into their family. Li Huai eventually leaves after learning his grandfather's famous skills and finds a treasure hoard left behind by his maternal family. He roams the jianghu with his newly-mastered skills and wealth to help the poor and fight injustice.

During his adventures, Li Huai gets involved in a love triangle with two women: Xue Caiyue and Fang Keke. Xue Caiyue and him are star-crossed because his father had killed her father in a duel many years ago, and she still seeks vengeance. Fang Keke has a crush on him and feels indebted to him because he had used his wealth to help her change her life. At the same time, Li Huai's two childhood friends also play significant roles in shaping his path: Zhao Chuan is kind towards him but he is also secretly in love with Fang Keke, while the scheming and ungrateful Zhang Zhen exploits Li Huai to achieve his dream of becoming the richest man in town.

== Cast ==
- Julian Cheung as Li Huai
- Ruby Lin as Xue Caiyue
- Dong Jie as Fang Keke
- Sun Xing as Xue Qingbi
- Gao Hongxian as Zhao Chuan
- Zheng Guolin as Zhang Zhen
- Kou Zhenhai as Li Manqing
- Cecilia Han as Leng Xiaoxing
- Yue Yueli as Fang Tianhao
- Liu Weihua as Han Jun
- Li Xueqing as the Emperor

== See also ==
- The Sentimental Swordsman
- The Romantic Swordsman (1978 TV series)
- The Romantic Swordsman (1995 TV series)
