= Chi Kuan-chun =

Hong Kong–based Chinese actor, martial artist, and Hung Ga practitioner

Chi Kuan-Chun
- Born: June 14, 1949 (age 77); Guangdong, Republic of China
- Occupations: Actor; martial artist

Chinese name
- Traditional Chinese: 戚冠軍
- Simplified Chinese: 戚冠军
Transcriptions
Standard Mandarin
- Hanyu Pinyin: Qī Guànjūn

Chi Kuan-Chun (born June 14, 1949), also known as Chik Goon-Gwan, is a Hong Kong–based Chinese actor, martial artist, and Hung Ga practitioner. He is best known for playing Shaolin rebel Hu Huei Chien (Hu Hui Gan) in several martial arts films in the 1970s. He also co-starred with Alexander Fu in many films at that time.

== Life and career ==
Born as Wu Dong-Wai in Guangdong, China, Chi went to Hong Kong with his family at early age. He graduated from Sam Yuk Middle School and took acting course at the Cathay Studio in 1968. After winning first place at the "Manhood Competition" held by the Chiang Jiang Film Company, Chi signed with Chang’s Film Company, a division of the Shaw Brothers. His acting debut was Chang Cheh's Men from the Monastery, and had since appeared in many of Chang's later films, including Shaolin Martial Arts, Disciples of Shaolin, The Shaolin Avengers and Magnificent Wanderers. After completing his contract with Chang Cheh in 1976, Chi founded Champion Film Company. In 1977, he went to Taiwan to further his career, and starred in films like Showdown at the Cotton Mill.

In 1990s, he retired but made a comeback in Lau Kar-Leung's Drunken Monkey (2003) and later in Tsui Hark's Seven Swords (2005).

== Hung Gar school ==
Chi started his Hung Gar training in 1961 with Chiu Wai in Hong Kong and is the 4th generation disciple of Wong Fei-hung's lineage. In October 2000, he established his own Hung Gar school, Chi Kuan-Chun Martial Arts Hong Quan Institute.

== Filmography ==
List of acting performances in film
Title	Year	Role	Notes
Men from the Monastery	1974	Hu Huei Chien	
Five Shaolin Masters	1974	Li Shih-Kai	
Shaolin Martial Arts	1974	Pa Chung/Chen Bao Rong	
Disciples of Shaolin	1975	Wang Hon	
Marco Polo	1975	Zhou Xingzheng	
7-Man Army	1976	Private Chu Tiancheng	
Boxer Rebellion	1976	Shuai Fang Yun	
Shaolin Temple	1976	Hu Hui Gan	
The Shaolin Avengers	1976	Hu Huigan	
Eagle's Claw	1977	Chen Tien Chun	
Magnificent Wanderers	1977	Shi Da Yong	
The Naval Commandos	1977	Capt. Hu Jing Duan	
The Golden Mask	1977	Lung Chun San	
The Iron Monkey	1977	Fung Kong	
The Murder of Murders	1978		
Shaolin Invincible Guys	1978		
Shaolin Kung Fu Master	1978		
Eagle's Claw and Butterfly Palm	1978	patriot (cameo)	
Revenge of the Shaolin Kid	1978	Lee Tien Chow	
Showdown at the Cotton Mill	1978	Hu Huigan	
Ways of Kung Fu	1978	Ta Kung	
Green Jade Statuette	1978	Wu Kang	
Iron Fisted Eagle's Claw	1979		
Shaolin Red Master	1979	Su	
Relentless Broken Blade	1979	Chiu Yi-Han	
Immortal Warriors	1979	cameo	
The Big Rascal	1979	Ho	Director/writer
Snake Shadow, Lama Fist	1979	Chi Yuen	
Yoga and the Kung Fu Girl	1979	Ho Fei	
The Battle of Ku-ning-tou	1979		
Yongmun Swordsman	1979		
Roving Heroes	1980		
Beggars Have No Equal	1980		
Queen Bee	1981		
Black Eagle's Blades	1981		
Eagle Fists	1981	Liu Chin Chun	
Queen Bee's Revenge	1981		
Iron Neck Li	1981	Iron Neck Li Yung	
Little Flying Dragon	1982		
Lone Ninja Warrior	1982	Wild Wolf	
Bloody Mission	1982		
Crazy Horse, Intelligent Monkey	1982		
Burning of the Red Lotus Monastery	1982		
Rescue from Hades	1982		
Shanghai 13	1984	Leopard	
Thunder of Gigantic Serpent	1984		
King of Snake	1984		
Lucky Dragon	1991		
Lady Killer (1)	1992		
Wolf of Revenge	1992		
Guardian Angel	1994		
Drunken Monkey	2003	Yu Hoi Yeung	
Seven Swords	2005	Qiu Luo Dong	
That Demon Within	2014	Dave's father	
