= Lan Tung =

Taiwanese–Canadian musician

Lan Tung 董篮
- Born: 1972/1973 (age 52)
- Origin: Taiwanese–Canadian
- Occupations: Musician; composer; producer
- Instruments: Erhu; vocals
- Years active: 1997–present

Lan Tung (born in 1972 or 1973; traditional Chinese: 董籃; simplified Chinese: 董篮) is a Taiwanese–Canadian musician and erhuist. She is an erhu performer, vocalist, composer, producer, and administrator. She is the artistic director of Orchid Ensemble, Sound of Dragon Ensemble, Vancouver Erhu Quartet, Crossbridge Strings, Proliferasian, and Sound of Dragon Music Festival.

== Biography ==
Lan Tung was born in 1972 or 1973 in Taiwan to Yenliang Tung and Eliza Chang. Her parents were writers. She has a younger brother, Dorian. The family adhered to the principles of Confucianism and were not religious. In her youth, her father was fond of Zhou Xuan's music and she would frequently hum Zhou's songs. When she was in an elementary school ensemble, Lan Tung was introduced to the erhu at the age of 10. Tung attended the Chinese Culture University's Department of Music, where she studied traditional Chinese music. Over multiple years, her parents had sought to use the Self-Employed Program to immigrate to Canada and their application was accepted. She emigrated with her family from Taiwan to Canada in 1994, and the family of four were residents of North Vancouver in 1997.

Tung had to drop out of Chinese Culture University in her second year to join her parents in Canada. She enrolled in Capilano Community College, where she studied for a year in the school's English as a Second Language program. At Capilano, she started over as a first-year student in 1995, pursuing a degree in music therapy. In her second year at the community college in 1997, Tung started Orchid Ensemble, a musical ensemble. In 2000, Tung founded Proliferasian, a musical group that performs musical improvisations and compositions. Using her musical therapy certification from Capilano, she provided sessions in elder care facilities on a part-time basis in 2006. Tung's husband is Jonathan Bernard.

Tung learned from the erhuists Jiebing Chen in San Francisco and Zhang Funming in Beijing. She subsequently was taught by Kala Ramnath, a Mumbai-based violinist, and Alfred Gamil, a Cairo-–based violinist. The World Journal's Lu Hui-ping said in 2013, "Her erhu improvisations and compositions are renowned in the Canadian and international music scene."

== Bibliography ==
- Jing, Xia (May 2022). Shaping Selves in the Diaspora: Contemporary Professional Chinese Instrumental Musicians and Transnational/Intercultural Music-Making in North America (PhD thesis). Memorial University of Newfoundland. Archived from the original on 27 October 2025.
