= Shaolin Temple (1976 film) =

1976 Hong Kong film by Chang Cheh

- Theatrical poster
- Directed by: Chang Cheh; Wu Ma (Joint Director)
- Written by: Ni Kuang; Chang Cheh
- Produced by: Sir Run Run Shaw
- Starring: David Chiang; Ti Lung; Alexander Fu Sheng; Chi Kuan Chun; Wang Lung Wei; Kuo Chui
- Cinematography: Kung Mu-To
- Edited by: Chiang Hsing-Lung
- Music by: Chen Yung-Yu
- Distributed by: Shaw Brothers Studio
- Release date: 22 December 1976
- Running time: 126 minutes
- Country: Hong Kong
- Languages: Cantonese; Mandarin

Shaolin Temple, a.k.a. Death Chamber, is a Shaw Brothers film directed by Chang Cheh. It is one of the Shaolin Temple themed martial arts films and concerns their rebellion against the Qings, with an all-star cast featuring the second and third generations of Chang Cheh's stable of actors including David Chiang, Ti Lung, Alexander Fu Sheng and Chi Kuan Chun, as well as cameo appearances by several of the actors that would later become collectively known as the Venoms mob. The film serves as a pseudo-prequel to Five Shaolin Masters.

== Plot ==
The film opens with the chief Shaolin Monks realizing that time is not on their side and they must train more fighters to fight the Qings. The monk Hai Hsien opposes this as he is secretly working for the court. Outside many men are sitting in front of the temple waiting to be accepted in, Fang Shih Yu, Ma Chao-hsing and others, as the temple tests the will of potential students by making them wait outside for days, eventually the two are accepted in for "training". Fang Shih Yu becomes frustrated immediately as Shaolin methods of teaching martial arts are rather obscure, although Ma Chao-hsing begins learning the five animal styles from the start.

Elsewhere, escaped Ming soldiers Tsai Te-cheng, Hu Te-ti, Yen Yung-chun, and Ma Fu Yi arrive close to Shaolin looking for a place to hide from the Qing. Hu Te-ti suggests they go to Shaolin and they are instantly accepted, which frustrates three more students trying to get acceptance into the temple, Lin Kwong Yao, Huang Sung Han, and Hu Hui Chien. The three are eventually accepted and begin their obscure training. Tsai Te-cheng learns the wing chun style from a strange female monk and Hu Te-ti learns the iron whip. This forces Hai Hsein to secretly go to the court and report to Prince Hoo that Shaolin has been training new fighters.

The Qing scheme to destroy Shaolin. Hai Hsein returns to Shaolin looking to recruit more traitors to set up the temple for a raid. All the accepted students become close friends and proficient in their kung fu, except for Fang Shih Yu (who is unknowingly learning tiger boxing but is impatient). He keeps getting into fights with Ma Fu Yi, who is disgruntled with being at Shaolin. A mysterious figure at night begins teaching Fang Shih Yu the tiger-crane style and he defeats Ma Fu Yi in a friendly spar. This sparks the curiosity of Hai Hsein as he takes Ma Fu Yi under his wing and recruits him as a traitor. Things begin to go sour at the temple due to the treachery of Hai Hsein and Ma Fu Yi and it is eventually attacked by thousands of Qing soldiers, and an all-out battle occurs at Shaolin Temple with only eight Shaolin devotees escaping the ensuing massacre.

== Cast ==
- David Chiang – Hu Te-Ti
- Ti Lung – Tsai Te-Cheng
- Yueh Hua – Li Se Kai
- Wang Chung – Fang Ta Hung
- Tony Liu – Ma Chao-Hsing
- Wang Lung Wei – Ma Fu Yi
- Alexander Fu Sheng – Fang Shih-Yu (Fong Sai-yuk)
- Kuan Chun Chi – Hu Hui Chien
- Frankie Wei Hung – Hung Hsi-Kuan
- Kuo Chui – Lin Kwong-Yao
- Lee Yi-Min – Huang Sung Han
- Tang Yen-Tsan – Chu Tao
- Shan Mao – Shaolin monk Hai Hsein
- Chiang Sheng – Shaolin monk Man Yue
- Shih Szu – Yen Yung-Chun
- Ku Feng – King Man Kuei
- Lu Feng – General Hu Pei-Chi
- Tsai Hung – General Ching
- Wong Ching – General Shin
- Lo Mang – Junior monk
- Wei Pai – Junior monk (slain by Manchu archers)

== Production ==
Shaolin Temple was the first film made by director Chang Cheh about the destruction of the Henan monastery without the action choreographer Lau Kar-leung.

== Release ==
Shaolin Temple was released on 22 December 1976 in Hong Kong. On the film's release in the United States, it was titled Death Chamber.

== Reception ==
Donald Guarisco of AllMovie gave a positive review of the film and called it "a solid, surprisingly thoughtful example of the kung fu genre that is worth the time for the genre's fans."
