= The Loot =

1980 Hong Kong film by Eric Tsang

The Loot 賊贓
- Film poster
- Directed by: Eric Tsang
- Written by: Wong Ying
- Produced by: Lo Wei
- Starring: David Chiang; Norman Chui; Kwan Young Moon; Philip Ko; Lily Li; Alan Chui Chung-San
- Cinematography: Chen Hao-Ran
- Edited by: Tony Kwok-Chung Chow
- Music by: Frankie Chan
- Distributed by: Goodyear Movie Company
- Release date: 11 June 1980 (Hong Kong)
- Running time: 93 minutes
- Country: Hong Kong
- Language: Cantonese

The Loot, also known as The Bloody Tattoo (Chinese: 賊贓) is 1980 martial arts comedy film directed by Eric Tsang and starring David Chiang and Philip Ko.

== Plot ==
The rival bounty hunter, Yang Wai who has been working for the police department has been hired by Chiu Foon to protect himself from the Spider, a mysterious and deadly criminal that no one has been found yet. Meanwhile, Fang Chung has been busting robbers while impersonating as a fake Spider. When the real mastermind Chiu Foon and Killer Ko Yu Shing has been stealing the treasures, Yang Wai and Fang Chung decided to investigate on the robbery and take Ko Yu Shing and Chiu Foon down once and for all.

== Cast ==
- David Chiang as Yang Wai/Robert
- Norman Chui as Fang Chung
- Kwan Young Moon as Chiu Foon
- Philip Ko as Ko Yu Shing
- Lily Li as Kong Fei Ha
- Alan Chui Chung-San as Thief Black Wolf
- Eric Tsang as Security Chief's assistant
- Chan Gwan-Biu as Chan Gwan Bo
- Chen Shao Lung as Chiu Foon's Bodyguard
- Huang Ha as Chiu Foon's Bodyguard
- Lee Gong as Thief Cover Head West
- Gam Sai Yuk as Sam Chun San
- Ho Chi Wai as White Tiger
- Phillip So Yuen Fung as Blue Dragon

== Reception ==
The author John Charles penned a mixed review of the film, writing, "the kung fu is routinely staged and most of the comedy is strained ... but the developing mystery is fairly engrossing, making this an adequate time killer for devotees of old-school martial arts movies". Clive Davies, an author, thought that the choreography of the action "all top-notch". According to the writer Richard Meyers, "the plot is secondary to the imaginative choreography, which was designed to show off everyone's best attributes".
