= Vengeance (1970 film) =

1970 Hong Kong film by Chang Cheh

- DVD cover
- Directed by: Chang Cheh
- Written by: Chang Cheh; Ni Kuang
- Produced by: Runme Shaw
- Starring: David Chiang; Wang Ping; Ti Lung
- Cinematography: Kung Mu-To
- Edited by: Chiang Hsing-Lung
- Music by: Wang Fu-ling
- Production company: Shaw Brothers Studio
- Release date: 14 May 1970 (Hong Kong)
- Running time: 98 minutes
- Country: Hong Kong
- Language: Mandarin

Vengeance (報仇; original Hong Kong title, Bao chou) is a 1970 kung fu film directed by Chang Cheh, and starring David Chiang, Wang Ping and Ti Lung. The film is set in Peking in 1925, and centers on a revenge plight of Chiang. The movie has little actual kung fu and instead is heavily laden with knife fighting and judo.

At the 16th Asian Film Festival, director Chang Cheh won the Best Director award, David Chiang won the Best Actor award and received Asia's first Movie King Award, and Vengeance went on to win the Best Movie award and the Iron Triangle.
