= They Said =

2012 studio album by Han Xue

Studio album by Han Xue
- Released: 15 August 2012
- Genre: Pop; Mandopop
- Label: Gold Typhoon

Han Xue chronology
A Journey Into Fantasy (2007)	They Said (2012)

They Said (他们说) is the fourth solo album by Chinese singer and actress Han Xue, also known as Cecilia Han, released on 15 August 2012 by Gold Typhoon. Han Xue spent over five years working on the album, her first release since A Journey Into Fantasy in 2007, written and produced with the intent of shedding her "girl next door" image. "Ephemera" won the 20th Annual Top Chinese Music Awards for best song.

== Writing and recording ==
Han Xue wrote the lyrics for nine of the eleven songs. Albert Leung and Francis Lee contributed additional lyrics. In talking about the change in style of the album and the writing of her songs, she said she "did not want to be a flower that is cared for and has the courage to create her own ideals".

Han Xue invited Albert Leung to write the Mandarin lyrics for "Love Is a Fire", an original song written by American writer Roxanne Seeman with Danish writers Claus Christensen, Per Lange, and Simon Munk, producer/writer. Before asking Leung, she was told he may not necessarily give her his time or his best songs but found, when she gave him her song, she received “Love Is a Fire”, the lyrics he wrote, quickly. The lyrics express the true and false feelings of love, between the flickering of light and shadow.

== Music video ==
The MV for "They Said" premiered on the internet on August 23, 2012. Shooting a music video for Han Xue, a film and TV actress, looking into the camera and singing to express herself was a new experience. In one of the scenes, Han Xue stood in the center of a stage filled with shattered glass looking at reflections of herself which made her feel a little nervous.

== Press conference ==
On August 16, 2012, Gold Typhoon held a press conference in Beijing announcing the signing of Han Xue with the release of They Said. Han Xue met with media across the country and put on a performance of songs from the album, including "They Said" and "Ephemera". The music video of "Ephemera" first aired at the press conference, premiering one week later.

For the press conference, the clothing was custom-made by Judyhua, fashion designer, with the theme of a butterfly, symbolizing rebirth and transformation after breaking out of the cocoon. Han Xue was presented with a special gift from Ms. Qi Yalei, the president of Gold Typhoon, of "crystal shoes", also symbolizing transformation and growth.

== Track listing ==
They Said track listing
No.	Title	Writer(s)	Length
1.	"Ephemera" (昙花)	李焯雄; 露米娜
2.	"Midsummer Song" (盛夏的歌)	韩雪; 吴天
3.	"They Said" (他们说 (Tamen Shuo))	韩雪; 吴天
4.	"This Is Our Youth" (这就是我们的青春)	韩雪; 施佳阳
5.	"Su Ming Lun" (宿命论)	韩雪; 郑颂恩
6.	"Zui Hao Shi Guang Zui Hao De Ai"	韩雪; 林祖明
7.	"Midnight in Paris"	韩雪; 施佳阳
8.	"Ai Jiu Yi Ba huo" (Love Is a Fire)	Roxanne Seeman; Claus Christensen; Simon Mink; Per Lange
9.	"Li Bu Kai Ni" (离不开你)	韩雪; Kwon Gyu
10.	"Tao Li" (逃离)	韩雪; 施佳阳
11.	"1050–2009"	韩雪; 施佳阳
