= Iron Fisted Eagle's Claw =

1979 Hong Kong-Taiwanese film by To Man Bo and Ahn Hyun Cheol

- 瘋拳癲腿
- Directed by: To Man Bo; Ahn Hyun Cheol
- Starring: Leung Siu-lung; Chi Kuan-chun; Chan Sing
- Distributed by: Filmline Enterprise
- Release date: 1979
- Running time: 85 minutes
- Countries: Hong Kong; Taiwan
- Language: Mandarin

Iron Fisted Eagle's Claw is a 1979 martial arts movie directed by To Man Bo and starring Bruce Liang and Chi Kuan-chun. A Hong Kong-Taiwanese co-production, the movie is also known as Young Moon Ho Gaek (용문호객) in Korea and Der Kleine und der Drunken Master in Germany.

== Plot ==
Chu Kun and Benny Pang, fight against the Tiger's group to avenge for Captain Liu and save the town. To do this, Chu Kun and Pang learns secret iron fisted kung fu from the book that old Drunken Mater gave. Soon Chu Kun and Pang masters secret and powerful iron fist and fight against the Tiger's group.

== Casts and Directors ==
- Leung Siu-lung as Benny Pang/Pang
- Chi Kuan-chun as Chu Kun
- Chan Sing as Tiger/Big Brother
- Philip Ko as the Drunken Master
- Park Jong Kuk as Captain Liu
- Kim Yu Haeng as first Brother
- Lam Hak Ming as third Brother
- Yuen Tau Wan as second Brother
- Lai Sau Kit as fourth Brother
- Kwak Mu Seong
- Steve Mak
- Lau Yuen

=== Additional Staffs ===
- Leung Siu-lung - Action Choreographer
- Alan Chui Chung-San - Action Choreographer
- Lam Hak Ming - Action Choreographer
- To Man Bo - Director
- Kim Ki Young - Producer
- Wu Fan Shen - Cinematographer
- Eddie Wang - Composer
- Yu Sun - Editor
- Kong Yang - Screenplay

== Production ==
The movie was filmed in South Korea and released in Taiwan and Hong Kong.
