= Four Riders =

1972 Hong Kong film by Chang Cheh

- Film poster
- Directed by: Chang Cheh
- Screenplay by: Chang Cheh; Ni Kuang
- Produced by: Runme Shaw
- Starring: David Chiang; Ti Lung; Chen Kuan-Tai; Wang Chung; Yasuaki Kurata
- Cinematography: Kung Mu-To
- Edited by: Kwok Ting-Hung
- Music by: Frankie Chan
- Distributed by: Shaw Brothers Studio
- Release date: 22 December 1972 (Hong Kong)
- Running time: 113 minutes
- Country: Hong Kong
- Language: Mandarin

Four Riders, a.k.a. Hellfighters of the East, is a 1972 Hong Kong film directed by Chang Cheh. It stars David Chiang, Ti Lung Chen Kuan-Tai, Wang Chung and Yasuaki Kurata.

Four Riders was produced by Shaw Studios and distributed in the U.S. as a dubbed version titled Strike 4 Revenge by World Northal Corp. in 1983.

== Cast ==
- David Chiang
- Ti Lung
- Chen Kuan-Tai
- Wang Chung
- Yasuaki Kurata
