= Orchid Ensemble =

Canadian musical ensemble

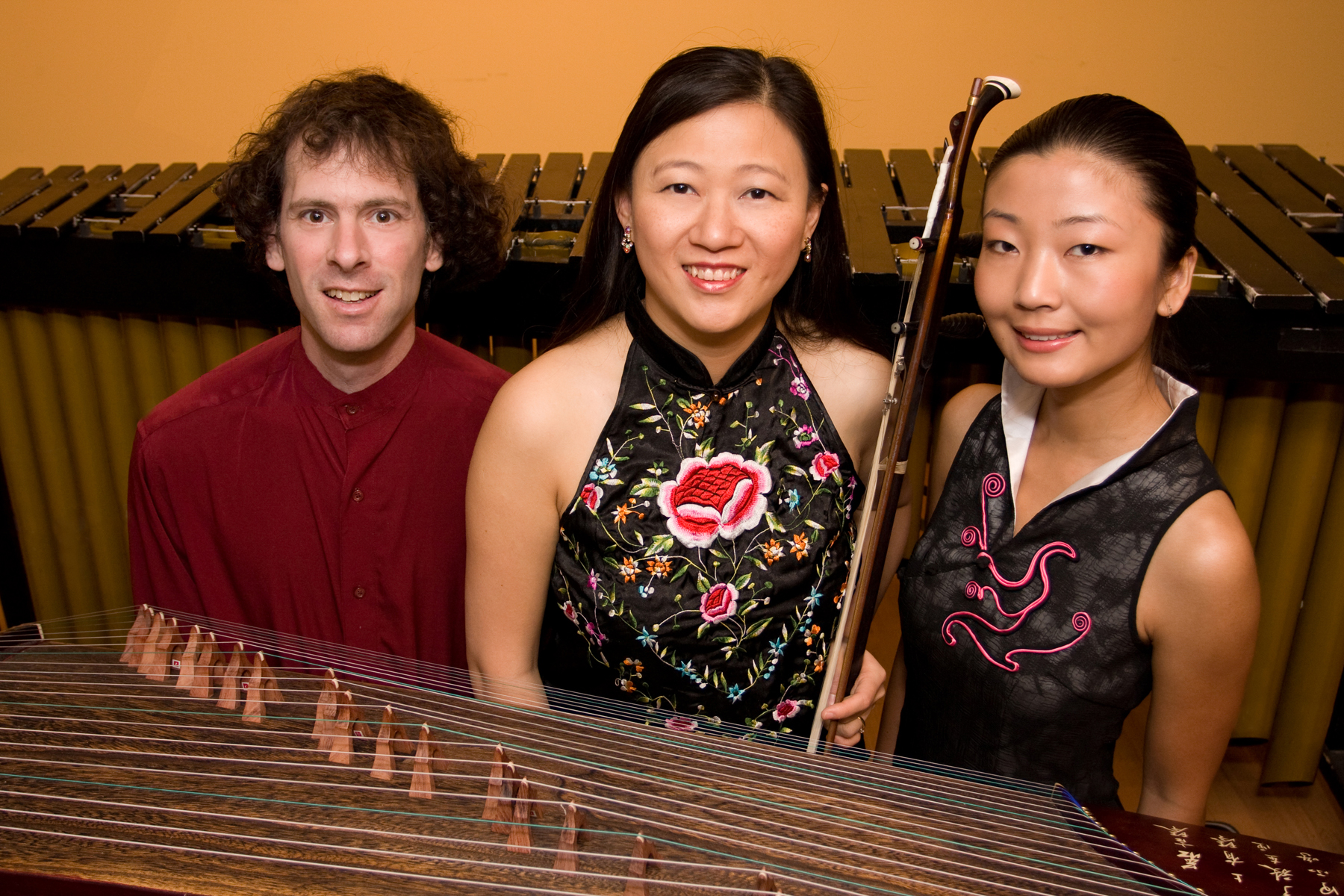
- Left to right - Jonathan Bernard (percussion), Lan Tung (erhu), and Bei Bei He (zheng)

Background information
- Origin: Vancouver, British Columbia, Canada
- Genres: World
- Years active: 1997–present
- Members: Lan Tung; Dailin Hsieh; Jonathan Bernard
- Past members: Haiqiong Deng; Mei Han; Geling Jiang; Bei Bei He
- Website: orchidensemble.com

The Orchid Ensemble is a Canadian musical ensemble formed in 1997 in Vancouver. It is led by Lan Tung from Taiwan on erhu, with Yu-Chen Wang from Taiwan on guzheng and Jonathan Bernard from Canada on various percussion instruments. Former guzheng players include Haiqiong Deng, Mei Han, Geling Jiang, and Bei Bei He.

The trio combines musical traditions from China and elsewhere, and its repertoire ranges from the traditional and contemporary music of China, world music, new music and creative improvisation.

The Orchid Ensemble has recorded five CDs. Heartland was nominated for Best Instrumental Music and Best World Music by 2001 West Coast Music Awards. Road to Kashgar was nominated for world album of the Year by 2005 Juno Awards. Life Death Tears Dream won the 2013 International Independent Music Awards.

== Discography ==
- Heartland (2000)
- Road to Kashgar (2004)
- Life Death Tears Dream (2012)
- From A Dream (2018)
- Celestial River (2024)
