= Five Shaolin Masters =

1974 Hong Kong film by Chang Cheh

- Film poster
- Directed by: Chang Cheh
- Written by: I Kuang
- Produced by: Run Run Shaw
- Starring: David Chiang; Ti Lung; Alexander Fu Sheng; Chi Kuan Chun; Meng Fei; Wang Lung Wei
- Cinematography: Kung Mu To; Hsu Te Li
- Edited by: Kuo Ting Hung
- Music by: Chen Yung-Yu
- Distributed by: Shaw Brothers Studio
- Release date: 25 December 1974
- Running time: 105 minutes
- Country: Hong Kong
- Languages: Cantonese; Mandarin

Five Shaolin Masters (Chinese: 少林五祖), a.k.a. 5 Masters of Death, is a 1974 Shaw Brothers kung fu film directed by Chang Cheh, with action choreography by Lau Kar Leung and Lau Kar Wing.

The film focuses on Shaolin's historic rivalries with the Qing Dynasty. A pseudo-prequel, Shaolin Temple, was released in 1976.

== Plot ==
Five young fighters survive to escape the burning Shaolin temple after the Qing soldiers destroyed it. The five regroup and establish secret codes to identify themselves and fellow patriots. They swear vengeance and decide to enlist other patriots, then reunite to escape from the Qing forces. They also commit to uncovering the identity of the traitorous insider who had sold out the Shaolin temple.

The traitor, Ma Fu-Yi, joins with top Qing fighters to eliminate the rebels, but he is exposed by Ma Chao-Tsing, one of the five Shaolin escapees, who gets captured. Hu Te-Ti meets up with a group of Shaolin fighters secretly posing as bandits and recruits them to help rescue Ma Chao-Tsing. Their bandit leader is killed in the process, so the bandits join the rest of the Shaolin patriots to fight the Qing invaders.

Suffering successive defeats at the hands of the Qing kung fu experts, the five young fighters return to the Shaolin temple ruins to perfect their kung fu and prepare to take revenge for their destroyed temple and murdered comrades. Each of the five must face a more seasoned master in single combat, so each trains to master fighting forms and techniques to counter the specific skills and weaponry of each individual enemy, man to man.

== Cast ==
The five Shaolin patriots:

- Ti Lung as Tsai Te-Chung (Chinese: 蔡德中; Cantonese Yale: Cài Dézhōng)
- Alexander Fu Sheng as Ma Chao-Hsing (Chinese: 馬朝興; Cantonese Yale: Mǎ Cháo-xìng)
- Meng Fei as Fang Ta-Hung (Chinese: 方大鴻; Cantonese Yale: Fāng Dàhóng)
- Chi Kuan Chun as Li Shih-Kai (Chinese: 李世凱; Cantonese Yale: Lǐ Shì-kǎi)
- David Chiang as Hu Te-Ti (Chinese: 胡特提; Cantonese Yale: Hú Tè-tí)

Their five main adversaries:

- Liang Chia Jen as Chien San (Chinese: 建山; Cantonese Yale: Jiàn Shān)
- Feng Ko An as Chang Chin-Chiu (Chinese: 張金秋; Cantonese Yale: Zhāng Jīn-qiū)
- Chiang Tao as Chen Wen-Yao (Chinese: 陳文耀; Cantonese Yale: Chén Wén-yào)
- Tsai Hung as Pao Yu-Lung (Chinese: 鮑裕隆; Cantonese Yale: Bào Yù-lóng)
- Wang Lung Wei as Ma Fu-Yi (Chinese: 馬福義; Cantonese Yale: Mǎ Fú-yì)

== Production ==
In 1974, director Chang Cheh and action choreographer Lau Kar-leung worked together on four feature films about the destruction of the Shaolin temple. Five Shaolin Masters was the last of these collaborations. Lau Kar-leung considered leaving the film industry to open up his own martial arts school in the United States, but ultimately chose to keep working for Shaw Brothers. Lau Kar-Leung took credit for the Shaolin temple storyline of these films, stating that Chang "didn't understand kung fu very well". The film was mostly shot in Taiwan.

== Release ==
Five Shaolin Masters was released in Hong Kong on 25 December 1974. It was released in the United States as 5 Masters of Death.
