= Double Fattiness =

1988 Hong Kong film by David Chiang

- Film poster

Chinese name
- Traditional Chinese: 雙肥臨門
- Simplified Chinese: 双肥临门
Transcriptions
Standard Mandarin
- Hanyu Pinyin: Shuāng Féi Lín Mén
Yue: Cantonese
- Jyutping: Seong1 Fei2 Lam4 Mun4
- Directed by: David Chiang
- Screenplay by: Gordon Chan; Siu Kwok-wa; Pang Chi-ming
- Story by: Kim Yip
- Produced by: Stephen Shin
- Starring: Bill Tung; Lydia Shum; Eric Tsang; Maggie Cheung
- Cinematography: Yee Tung-lung
- Edited by: Cheung Kwok-kuen; Lee Yim-hoi
- Music by: David Chung; Tang Siu-lam
- Distributed by: D&B Films
- Release date: 19 May 1988
- Running time: 91 minutes
- Country: Hong Kong
- Language: Cantonese
- Box office: HK$12,719,337

Double Fattiness (Chinese: 雙肥臨門) is a 1988 Hong Kong comedy film directed by David Chiang and starring Bill Tung, Lydia Shum, Eric Tsang and Maggie Cheung.

== Plot ==
The movie revolved around a Chinese flatbread restaurant in Hong Kong, where the Mo family worked and make a living. Luk Siu-fung (Lydia Shum) is the matriarch of the family, protecting them against all external threats from local gangsters, while also serving the family's every need. However, Siu-fung suffers from heart problems, and on the eve of her wedding anniversary with her longtime husband, Mo Chak-shu, Siu-fung died.

Before Siu-fung died, she expressed a desire to ride a Chinese Wedding Sedan in the afterlife, which Chak-shu and his son, Sonny, promises. When Siu-fung reaches the underworld, the wedding sedan arrived just in time to carry Siu-fung over the Neihe Bridge, where she will officially reach the underworld and be prepared for reincarnation. After proper registrations, Siu-fung (who is grossly overweight) attempted to cross the Neihe Bridge with the sedan, and the excessive weight caused the bridge to collapse. The sedan carriers, along with the sedan, fell to their death into the Neihe River, while Siu-fung was saved by the Spiritworld Keeper at the last moment.

Since the Neihe Bridge was destroyed, Siu-fung cannot cross the bridge, thus creating an anomaly where Siu-fung is not officially dead, in spiritworld terms. The spiritworld keeper attempted to guide Siu-fung back to human life, where she can reenter her body, and be returned to life. However, Siu-fung was a little late, and her husband and son pressed a button to cremate Siu-fung's body.

== Cast ==
This is a partial list of cast.

- Bill Tung as Mo Chak-shu (武則書)
- Lydia Shum as Luk Siu-fung / Miss Cho
- Eric Tsang as Sonny Mo Tak-ko
- Maggie Cheung as Diana
- Dennis Chan as Spiritworld Keeper
- Paul Chun as Kam Tai-tse
- James Wong as Orchestra Director
- David Chiang as 2nd Spiritworld Keeper
- Ronald Wong as Tse's men
- Teddy Yip as Mr Lin

== Character Naming and References ==
In Cantonese, the name "Mo" (武) is homonymic to the term "no/nothing/never" (無), therefore, Mo Chak-shu (武則書) is phonetically similar to the term "無執輸", which means "Will not lose" or "will not be at a disadvantage". Meanwhile, Mo Tak-ko (武德高) is phonetically similar to "無得高", which means "will never grow tall".

Paul Chun's character, Kam Tai-tse (金大枝) somewhat resembles the transliterated name of the former President of South Korea, Kim Dae-jung.

Mo Tak-ko's purported English name, Charles (as revealed to Diana), is a reference to Charles, Prince of Wales, while Diana's name is a reference to Diana, Princess of Wales.
