= Showdown at the Cotton Mill =

1978 Taiwanese-Hong Kong film by Wu Ma

- Film poster
- Traditional Chinese: 胡惠乾血戰西幝寺
- Directed by: Wu Ma
- Written by: Ni Kuang
- Produced by: Lau Wai-Ban
- Starring: Kuan-Chun Chi; Tao-liang Tan; Peng Chang
- Cinematography: Chen Hay-Lock
- Edited by: Peter Cheung
- Music by: Frankie Chan
- Production company: Long Year Film Company Production
- Release date: 1978
- Running time: 84 minutes
- Countries: Taiwan; Hong Kong
- Language: Mandarin

Showdown at the Cotton Mill (Chinese title: 胡惠乾血戰西禪寺; Mandarin: Hu Hui Chien xie zhan xi chan si), also released as Cold Face, Heart and Blood, is a 1978 martial arts action film directed by Wu Ma. A Taiwanese-Hong Kong co-production, the film was believed to be lost until Rarescope uncovered the film in a Taiwanese film vault. It is a sequel to the 1976 film The Shaolin Avengers, which was co-directed by Wu Ma and Chang Cheh and stars Kuan-Chun Chi as Hu Hui-Chien.

== Plot ==
After achieving fame from smashing the cotton mill, Shaolin hero Hu Hui-Chien has become the people's champion and the sworn enemy of the Ching government. So enraged are they that they employ the best fighters from the Wu Tang. A master leg fighter named Kao Chin Chung, whose "Flash Northern Legs" are undefeated in the whole of China, travels to Canton at the invitation of the Ching government to kill Shaolin master Hu Hui-Chien. This leads to the classic northern kicks and southern fist duel. The climax has Kao Chin being defeated and killed by Hu Hui Chien but Hu Hui Chien also dies from the kick wounds to end the movie.

== Cast ==
- Kuan-Chun Chi as Hu Hui-Chien
- Tao-liang Tan as Master Kao Chin Chung
- Peng Chang as Uy Hsing-Hung
- Ching Kuo Chung as Tung Chien-Chin
- Wan Fei
- Keung Li
- Mao Shan
