= Cairo Declaration (film) =

- Traditional Chinese: 開羅宣言
- Simplified Chinese: 开罗宣言
- Hanyu Pinyin: Kaīluó Xuānyán
- Directed by: Wen Deguang; Hu Minggang
- Written by: Liu Xing
- Produced by: Yu Zifei
- Starring: Hu Jun; Cecilia Han; Ma Xiaowei; Tang Guoqiang
- Production companies: August First Film Studio; Propaganda Department of the Chongqing Committee of the Chinese Communist Party
- Release date: 3 September 2015
- Running time: 98 minutes
- Country: China
- Languages: Mandarin; English; Japanese; Russian

Cairo Declaration is a 2015 Chinese 2D historical film directed by Wen Deguang and Hu Minggang and written by Liu Xing. The film stars Hu Jun, Cecilia Han, Ma Xiaowei, and Tang Guoqiang. The film was scheduled to be released on September 3, 2015.

The film was promoted by the August First Film Studio to mark the 70th anniversary of the victory of the Second Sino-Japanese War.

== Cast ==
- Isabella Charlton as Mary Churchill.
- Hu Jun as Shi Jianfeng, a password cracking expert.
- Cecilia Han as Edo Eiko, Shi Jianfeng's wife.
- Carina Lau as Soong Mei-ling, first lady of the Republic of China, Chiang Kai-shek's wife.
- Joan Chen as Soong Ching-ling, Sun Yat-sen's wife, Honorary Chairwoman of the People's Republic of China.
- Yu Zifei as Soong Ai-ling, H. H. Kung's wife.
- Ma Xiaowei as Chiang Kai-shek, Chairman of the Nationalist government.
- Tang Guoqiang as Mao Zedong, Chairman of the Chinese Communist Party, and author of Little Red Book.
- Daniel Krauser as Sorge, a Soviet intelligence personnel.
- Darren Grosvenor as Alexander Comstock Kirk, an American Ambassador.
- Yao Di as Huang Yiqing, an undercover agent of the Chinese Communist Party.
- He Zhengjun as He Yingqin, Commander in chief of the National Revolutionary Army.

== Production ==
The principal photography on the film began on March 9, 2015, in Liangjiang International Cinema of Chongqing city.

The film was shot on locations in Chongqing, Shanghai, Tianjin and Beijing.

== Poster controversy ==
The distributors issued promotional posters that individually featured Mao Zedong, Winston Churchill, Franklin Roosevelt, and Joseph Stalin. Chinese internet users have questioned the inclusion of Mao, instead of Chiang Kai-shek, Generalissimo of the Republic of China, in the posters, since Chiang was present at the Cairo Conference, but Mao was not. A Global Times editorial called the promotional move "inappropriate".

== Release ==
Theatrical release will be on September 3, 2015.

== Awards and nominations ==
Awards	Category	Nominee	Results	Ref.
31st Golden Rooster Awards	Best Original Music Score	Ye Xiaogang	Won	
