= The Pirate (1973 film) =

1973 Hong Kong film by Chang Cheh, Pao Hsueh-li and Wu Ma

- Film poster

Chinese name
- Traditional Chinese: 大海盜
- Simplified Chinese: 大海盗
Transcriptions
Standard Mandarin
- Hanyu Pinyin: Dà Hǎi Dào
Yue: Cantonese
- Jyutping: Daai6 Hoi2 Dou6
- Directed by: Chang Cheh; Pao Hsueh-li; Wu Ma
- Screenplay by: Ni Kuang
- Produced by: Runme Shaw
- Starring: Ti Lung; David Chiang; Tin Ching; Dean Shek; Yuen Man-tzu; Fan Mei-sheng; Yue Feng
- Cinematography: Kuang Han-lu; Yuen Teng-bong
- Edited by: Kwok Ting-hung
- Music by: Frankie Chan
- Production company: Shaw Brothers Studio
- Distributed by: Shaw Brothers Studio
- Release date: 27 July 1973
- Running time: 96 minutes
- Country: Hong Kong
- Language: Mandarin

The Pirate is a 1973 Hong Kong action martial arts film directed by Chang Cheh, Pao Hsueh-li and Wu Ma. The film is based on the life of 19th-century pirate Cheung Po Tsai, who is portrayed by Ti Lung.

== Plot synopsis ==
Pirate Cheung Po Tsai sails to a shoreline southern China disguised as a rich trader. There, the villagers live in poverty due to struggle against exploitation and corruption by the government. At the same time, Cheung attracts the attention of merchant Xiang You-lin (Tin Ching) and his sister, who are keen on killing him for a bounty offered on Cheung. Cheung then agrees to expedite funds to them in the form of cash and goods stolen from foreign invading colonists. While still on land, Cheung discovers that one of his former crew member Hua Er-dao (Fan Mei-sheng), who is an escaped convict, has captured his ship, goods and his crew. As Hua determines to seek vengeance on him, Cheung flees and seeks refuge in a casino.

The admiral of the Qing imperial court sends young general Wu Yee (David Chiang) to investigate where pirates are hiding and ultimately finds Cheung. As the two encounter each other, each of them display their skills in duel while also appreciating each other. Wu eventually grows respect for Cheung for his righteous nature and begins to question his own conscience. He decides to let Cheung escape the government forces tracking him, facilitating Cheung a boat. Cheung promises Wu Yee that they will meet again and finish their fight on their next encounter.

== Cast ==
- Ti Lung as Cheung Po Tsai
- David Chiang as General Wu Yee
- Tin Ching as Xiang You-lin
- Dean Shek as Master Bai
- Yuen Man-tzu as Hai Tang
- Fan Mei-shang as Hua Er-dao
- Yue Fung as 2nd Miss
- Lau Gong as Zeng Guo-xiong
- Bruce Tong as Ma Ping
- Wu Chi-chin as corrupt policeman
- Yeung Chak-lam as corrupt policeman
- Lo Dik as Leader at the ship docks
- Wang Kuang-yu as secret agent
- Cheng Keng-yeh as secret agent
- Ko Hung as Xiao Bao
- Wong Ching-ho as Desperate fisherman
- Liu Wai as Brothel Boss
- Shum Lo as Casino clerk
- Chui Fat as Pirate
- Lee Yung-kit as Pirate who gambles in casino
- Leung Seung-wan as Master Shing
- Tung Choi-bo as Casino Guard
- Tino Wong as thug
- Lau Chun-fai as thug
- Yuen Shun-yi as Pirate
- Lee Chiu as Pirate

== Critical reception ==
James Mudge of Beyond Hollywood gave the film a positive review and writes "Well made and featuring charismatic turns from two of the studio’s biggest stars, it should appeal not only to Shaw Brothers aficionados, but to all fans of the pirate film." Matthew Le-feuvre of City on Fire rated the film 8 stars out of 10 and writes "the defining novelty of both Ti Lung and David Chiang spearheading their eighteenth collaboration for an indelible saga of obligation, revenge and misguided loyalties, is itself a landmark achievement even by Hollywood conventions."
