= A Mobile Love Story =

- Created by: Jeff Chiang
- Starring: Wallace Huo, Han Xue, Christopher Lee
- Country of origin: China
- No. of episodes: 21

Production
- Running time: 45 mins (per episode)

A Mobile Love Story (Chinese: 爱情占线; pinyin: Ai Qing Zhan Xian) is a twenty-one episode Chinese Romance Idol drama starring Taiwanese heartthrob Wallace Huo and mainland singer-actress Han Xue with Singapore superstars Christopher Lee and Yvonne Lim. This series is a collaboration between China Central Television and Singapore's Mediacorp Network.

== Main cast ==
- Wallace Huo as Lu Yun Fei 陆云飞
- Han Xue as Mu Bei Bei 慕北北
- Christopher Lee as Lin Li Zhong 林立中
- Luo Shan Shan as You Li 尤 莉
- Yvonne Lim (Singaporean actress) as Su Fei

== Story ==
Mu Beibei (Han Xue) is a marketing student who aspires to work for a large marketing agency called Star River; meanwhile, she is supporting her tuition and her mother's medical bills by working part-time as a local small-town tour guide. During one of her assignments, she meets Lin Lizhong (Christopher Lee), a rich playboy from Singapore, whom she mistakes as a client. It is only at the end of the tour that it is revealed that Lizhong has only been posing as Beibei's client. When Lizhong learns that Beibei has not only lost her job as a result of the identity mix-up, but also lost her only means of financial support, he tries to repair the damage by becoming Beibei's friend.

Lu Yunfei (Wallace Huo) is an up-and-coming star in the advertising industry who has just started a marketing firm with a friend and has been nominated for an award for one of his projects. His long-time girlfriend, Su Fei (Yvonne Lim) has just returned to Shanghai after working abroad for two years as a doctor. Yunfei proposes to Su Fei. On their wedding day, Su Fei inexplicably leaves him. Yunfei tries to find Su Fei over the next several days, but she refuses to respond to his phone calls or SMSes. Finally, after texting a farewell message, Su Fei leaves her mobile phone behind and leaves the city.

Su Fei's mobile phone is picked up by Mu Beibei. Initially Beibei tries to help the sender find his girlfriend, even though she does not know him. His touching SMSes impresses Beibei. Over time, they begin to communicate through text messages, and become virtual friends. Beibei encourages Yunfei to start his life over, and Yunfei provides Beibei with moral support as she embarks on the next stage of her life.

A year later, Beibei graduates from school and looks for a job. By chance she is hired to work for Yunfei, who behaves insensitively towards his employees, and never fails to express his disappointment publicly when his employees do not meet his expectations. Neither Beibei nor Yunfei realize that they are friends in the online world. Over time, Yunfei begins to appreciate Beibei's tenacity, and respect the talent and potential in her. He decides to take Beibei under his wings. At the same time, Beibei begins to see that beneath Yunfei's icy exterior beats a warm heart.

Lin Lizhong continues to try to win Beibei's affections, but soon finds that he is caught in a love triangle with Beibei and Yunfei, when Beibei learns that Yunfei, her mentor and boss in real life, is also her good friend in the virtual world, with whom she has fallen in love. Yunfei, too, has unwittingly fallen in love with Beibei, and learns of Beibei's online identity, but his ex-girlfriend, Su Fei, returns, suffering from a rapidly progressing terminal illness. Yunfei must choose between being with the woman he now loves, or doing the right thing. Beibei decides to make the choice easier for Yunfei by leaving Shanghai for Singapore with Lizhong.

Before Beibei leaves, Yunfei asks Beibei if they can go on being friends through SMS, as they once used to be. In response, Beibei sends a chain text message to an unknown number saying that if anyone receives that message, they must send it to someone whom they care about. Beibei tells Yunfei that she will grant him another chance on one condition: this same text message must eventually come back to Beibei within two years...
