= Return of the Sentimental Swordsman =

1981 Hong Kong film by Chor Yuen

- Film poster
- 魔劍俠情
- Directed by: Chor Yuen
- Written by: Chor Yuen
- Based on: Duoqing Jianke Wuqing Jian by Gu Long
- Produced by: Run Run Shaw
- Starring: Ti Lung; Alexander Fu; Derek Yee; Ching Li; Lo Lieh; Ku Feng; Choh Seung-wan; Ku Kuan-chung; Kara Hui; Tony Liu; Elliot Ngok
- Narrated by: Cheng Miu
- Cinematography: Wong Chit
- Edited by: Chiang Hsing-lung; Yu Siu-fung
- Music by: Eddie H. Wang
- Production company: Shaw Brothers Studio
- Distributed by: Shaw Brothers Studio
- Release date: 31 January 1981
- Running time: 101 minutes
- Country: Hong Kong
- Language: Mandarin
- Box office: HK$4,302,930

Return of the Sentimental Swordsman (魔劍俠情), also known as The Flying Blade, is a 1981 Hong Kong wuxia film written and directed by Chor Yuen and produced by the Shaw Brothers Studio. Adapted from the second half of the novel Duoqing Jianke Wuqing Jian by Gu Long, it starred Ti Lung, Alexander Fu, and Derek Yee.

It is a sequel to The Sentimental Swordsman (1977) and one of the Shaw Brothers Studio's highest-grossing films, surpassing the first film at the box office. An in-name-only "sequel", Perils of the Sentimental Swordsman, was released in 1982, with no relation to the Xiaoli Feidao Series. Instead, it is adapted from the Lu Xiaofeng Series which is also by Gu Long.

== Synopsis ==
Li Xunhuan comes back to his home after three years of wandering. He has decided to have a normal life, but a group of skilled fighters and leaders are bent on killing him, so they can be ranked in the list of best fighters in the jianghu. Li battles them as he searches for his estranged friend Ah-fei, who is now married and living in seclusion. Li asks Ah-fei to join him in countering the Money Clan, which has emerged as a new threat to the jianghu.

== Cast ==
- Ti Lung as Li Xunhuan
- Alexander Fu as Jing Wuming
- Derek Yee as Ah-fei
- Ching Li as Lin Shiyin
- Lo Lieh as Hu Bugui
- Ku Feng as Shangguan Jinhong
- Choh Seung-wan as Lin Xian'er
- Ku Kuan-chung as Shangguan Fei
- Kara Hui as Sun Xiaohong
- Tony Liu as Lü Fengxian
- Elliot Ngok as Guo Songyang
- Cheng Miu as Tianji
- Yuen Wah as Ximen Rou
- Yuen Bun as Zhuge Gang
