= The Golden Doll =

- Poster
- Chinese: 古曼
- Directed by: Zhang Jiangnan
- Production companies: Shanghai Yuanting Media; Cike Entertainment (Beijing); Shanghai Mingcheng Production; Dejin Rongyu (Beijing) Culture; Shanxi Huayuan Entertainment
- Distributed by: Xinyue Pictures
- Release date: August 5, 2016
- Running time: 94 minutes
- Country: China
- Language: Mandarin
- Box office: CN¥3.5 million

The Golden Doll is a 2016 Chinese thriller film directed by Zhang Jiangnan. It was released in China by Xinyue Pictures on August 5, 2016.

== Cast ==
- Han Xue
- Sattawat Sethakorn
- Wu Yixuan
- Zhu Shengyi

== Reception ==
The film has grossed CN¥3.5 million at the Chinese box office.
