= The Romantic Swordsman (1978 TV series) =

1978 Hong Kong wuxia television series

- 小李飛刀
- Genre: Wuxia
- Based on: Duoqing Jianke Wuqing Jian by Gu Long
- Written by: Tam Ning
- Directed by: Wong Tin-lam
- Starring: Paul Chu; Wong Yuen-sun; Wong Hang-sau; Maggie Li
- Opening theme: "Little Li Flying Dagger" (小李飛刀) by Roman Tam
- Composers: Joseph Koo; Nonoy Ocampo
- Country of origin: Hong Kong
- Original language: Cantonese
- No. of episodes: 13

Production
- Executive producers: Johnnie To; Lau Sze-yu
- Producer: Wong Tin-lam
- Running time: ≈ 45 minutes per episode

Original release
- Network: TVB
- Release: 1978 – 1978

The Romantic Swordsman (小李飛刀) is a Hong Kong wuxia television series adapted from the novel Duoqing Jianke Wuqing Jian of the Xiaoli Feidao Series by Gu Long. The series was first broadcast on TVB in Hong Kong in 1978.

== Cast ==
- Paul Chu as Li Xunhuan
- Wong Yuen-sun as Ah-fei
- Wong Hang-sau as Lin Xian'er
- Maggie Li as Lin Shiyin
- Ko Miu-sze as Sun Xiaohong
- Kong To as Long Xiaoyun
- Yim Chau-wah as Long Xiaoyun
- Kwan Chung as You Longsheng
- Ho Lai-nam as Jing Wuming
- Cheung Chung as Shangguan Jinhong
- Wong Wan-choi as Shangguan Fei
- Lok Kung as Xinhu
- Kong Ngai as Xinmei
- Tsui Tiu as Xinshu
- Lo Kwok-wai as Xinjian
- Wong Sun as Baixiaosheng
- Tsui Kwong-lam as Tie Chuanjia
- Ho Pik-kin as Sun Tuozi
- Tik Wai as Zhuge Lei
- Cheung Sang as Yu Erguaizi
- Ng Man-tat as Sun Kui
- Tsui Sun-yi as Cangfeng
- Chan Wing-fai as Hong Hanmin
- Ho Lai-nam as White Snake
- Chan Ling-wai as Black Snake
- Siu Kin-kin as Yellow Boy
- Lung Tin-sang as Green Boy
- Kwan Kin as Third Brother
- Ko Kong as Zhao Zhengwo
- Kiu Hung as Tian Qi
- Ma Hing-sang as Ba Ying
- Ma Kin-tong as Tianji
- Leung Siu-tik as Ximen Rou
- Lee Ka-ding as Zhuge Gang
- Kam Hing-hin as Yi Ku
- Lit Yin-wun as Chuntao
- Lau Dan as Shangguan Jinxiong

== See also ==
- The Sentimental Swordsman
- The Romantic Swordsman (1995 TV series)
- Flying Daggers
