= The Romantic Swordsman (1995 TV series) =

1995 Hong Kong wuxia television series

- 小李飛刀
- Genre: Wuxia
- Based on: Duoqing Jianke Wuqing Jian by Gu Long
- Written by: Law Kam-fai
- Directed by: Lee Yuen-for
- Starring: Eddie Kwan; Gigi Fu; Emily Kwan; Chin Kar-lok
- Opening theme: "A Clear Heart Reflects the Bright Moon" (清心照明月) by William So
- Country of origin: Hong Kong
- Original language: Cantonese
- No. of episodes: 20

Production
- Producer: Lee Yuen-for
- Running time: ≈ 45 minutes per episode

Original release
- Network: TVB
- Release: September 11, 1995 – 1995

The Romantic Swordsman (小李飛刀) is a Hong Kong wuxia television series adapted from the novel Duoqing Jianke Wuqing Jian of the Xiaoli Feidao Series by Gu Long. It was broadcast on TVB in Hong Kong in September 1995.

== Cast ==
- Eddie Kwan as Li Xunhuan
- Gigi Fu as Lin Xian'er
- Emily Kwan as Lin Shiyin
- Chin Kar-lok as Ah-fei
- Wong Lung-wai as Plum Flower Bandit
- Chan Chit-man as Long Xiaoyun
- Tang Siu-chun as Long Tianci
- Leung Yam-kei as Shangguan Jinhong
- Wong Siu-yin as Sun Xiaohong

== See also ==
- The Sentimental Swordsman
- The Romantic Swordsman (1978 TV series)
- Flying Daggers
