= The Sentimental Swordsman =

1977 Hong Kong film by Chor Yuen

- Film poster
- 多情劍客無情劍
- Directed by: Chor Yuen
- Screenplay by: Chor Yuen
- Based on: Duoqing Jianke Wuqing Jian by Gu Long
- Produced by: Run Run Shaw
- Starring: Ti Lung; Derek Yee; Ching Li; Elliot Ngok; Fan Mei-sheng; Ku Feng
- Cinematography: Wong Chit
- Edited by: Chiang Hsing-lung
- Music by: Frankie Chan
- Production company: Shaw Brothers Studio
- Distributed by: Shaw Brothers Studio
- Release date: 14 October 1977
- Running time: 96 minutes
- Country: Hong Kong
- Language: Mandarin
- Box office: HK$1,603,264

The Sentimental Swordsman (多情劍客無情劍) is a 1977 Hong Kong wuxia film written and directed by Chor Yuen and produced by the Shaw Brothers Studio. It starred Ti Lung, Derek Yee, Ching Li, Elliot Ngok, Fan Mei-sheng, and Ku Feng. The film is adapted from the novel Duoqing Jianke Wuqing Jian of the Xiaoli Feidao Series by Gu Long.

The Sentimental Swordsman was one of the Shaw Brothers Studio's highest grossing films, and was followed by a 1981 sequel, Return of the Sentimental Swordsman. In 1982, the Shaw Brothers Studio released Perils of the Sentimental Swordsman, which is not related to the Xiaoli Feidao Series but adapted from the Lu Xiaofeng Series also by Gu Long.

== Synopsis ==
Due to his own extreme ideals, famed swordsman Li Xunhuan has lost everyone dear to him. After his life is saved by a rival swordsman, Li's overwhelming pride makes him forsake the woman he loves and lets her marry his saviour. Now resigned to traveling the country with his loyal aide, Li's only comfort is alcohol and the simple life he has now accepted. On one such journey, the lonely swordsman befriends the exceptionally skilled, yet secretive Ah-fei who has his own pressures to contend with. Li then finds himself embroiled in a battle to own the highly prized 'gold armoured vest' — a protective vest that can withstand any blow.

As he discovers that many of the people he meets have a hidden agenda, Li realises that Ah-fei is the only man he can truly trust. This new friendship is put under a test when the "sentimental swordsman" is hunted down by numerous hired killers and framed for a series of crimes he did not commit. The person behind Li's troubles proves to be elusive, though all the clues seem to point to the legendary "Plum Blossom Bandit", a disguised figure whose identity has long proved elusive to the jianghu.

== Cast ==
- Ti Lung as Li Xunhuan
- Ching Li as Lin Xian'er
- Derek Yee as Ah-fei
- Elliot Ngok as Long Xiaoyun
- Candice Yu as Lin Shiyin
- Fan Mei-sheng as Tie Chuanjia
- Ku Feng as Zhao Zhengyi
- Ngai Fei as Tian Qi
- Goo Man-chung as Gong Sun
- Ching Miao as the Shaolin abbot
- Yang Chih-ching as Xinmei
- Ku Kuan-chung as Xinjian
- Chan Shen as Xinshu
- Norman Chu as Iron Flute
- Wang Sha as Mei Er
- Shum Lo as Hua Feng
- Yuen Wah as You Longsheng
- Fung Hak-on as White Snake
- Alan Chui as Black Snake
- Chiang Nan as Five Poisons Boy
- Fung Ging-man as Five Poisons Boy
- Lam Ching-ying as Five Poisons Boy
- Lee Sau-kei as Zhuge Lei
- Lo Wai as Shen Laosan

== See also ==
- The Romantic Swordsman (1978 TV series)
- The Romantic Swordsman (1995 TV series)
- Flying Daggers
