= Han Shu (military officer) =

Chinese military officer

- 韩曙
- Born: 1922; Lingshi County, Shanxi, China
- Died: 2004 (aged 81–82); Suzhou, Jiangsu, China
- Relatives: Granddaughter: Cecilia Han
- Military career
- Allegiance: People's Republic of China
- Branch: People's Liberation Army Ground Force
- Service years: 1936-2004
- Rank: Senior colonel (1955)
- Units: 117th Division; 38th Army
- Commands: Deputy Commander of the 38th Army
- Conflicts: Chinese Civil War; Second Sino-Japanese War; Chinese Communist Revolution; Korean War
- Awards: Order of Bayi; Order of Independence and Freedom; Order of Liberation; Red Heart Order

Han Shu (simplified Chinese: 韩曙; traditional Chinese: 韓曙; pinyin: Hán Shǔ; 1922 – 31 May 2004) was a Chinese military officer.

== Biography ==
Han was born and raised in Lingshi County, Shanxi. He joined the Chinese Workers' and Peasants' Red Army in March 1936 and joined the Chinese Communist Party in April 1937. During the Second Sino-Japanese War, he had served as a propagandist, captain, director, and political commissar. During the Chinese Communist Revolution, he was a regimental commander in the People's Liberation Army. During the Korean War, he commanded the 117th Division. He was promoted to the rank of Senior colonel in 1955. He was retired from the post of Deputy Commander of the 38th Army. On May 31, 2004, he died in Suzhou, Jiangsu.

== Personal life ==
Han Shu's wife was once the leading lady in the Chinese People's Liberation Army Naval Song and Dance Troupe, his daughter is a noted musician in Canada, his granddaughter Cecilia Han is a noted singer and actress in China.
