= Xiaoli Feidao =

1968–1981 novel series by Gu Long

Xiaoli Feidao Series
- Duoqing Jianke Wuqing Jian (1968); Biancheng Langzi (1972); Jiuyue Yingfei (1973); Tianya Mingyue Dao (1974); Feidao, Youjian Feidao (1981)
- Author: Gu Long
- Original title: 小李飛刀系列
- Country: Taiwan; Hong Kong
- Language: Chinese
- Genre: Wuxia
- Publisher: Knightly World; Wuxia Chunqiu; Nan Qi Publishing House; China Times; United Daily News
- Published: 1968–1981
- Media type: Print

The Xiaoli Feidao series (小李飛刀系列), literally Little Li Flying Dagger Series, is a series of five wuxia novels by Gu Long. First published between 1968 and 1981, the five novels have since been adapted into seven films and 18 television series as of 2020. The series is named after the weapon and dagger-throwing technique used by Li Xunhuan, the protagonist of the first novel, and his successors. In the novels, the dagger is forged from ordinary steel and its blade measures three cun and seven fen (≈ 13.7 centimetres).

== Novels ==
=== Duoqing Jianke Wuqing Jian ===
Duoqing Jianke Wuqing Jian (多情劍客無情劍), literally Sentimental Swordsman, Ruthless Sword, was first published in two parts as a serial: from 1968 to 1969 in the Hong Kong magazine Knightly World (武俠世界) under the title Fengyun Diyidao (風雲第一刀); and from 1969 to 1970 in the Hong Kong magazine Wuxia Chunqiu (武俠春秋) under the title Tiedan Daxia Hun (鐵膽大俠魂). Both parts were later republished as a single novel by Spring and Autumn Publishing House (春秋出版社) under the title Duoqing Jianke Wuqing Jian.

The novel is set in 15th-century China during the reign of the Chenghua Emperor of the Ming dynasty. The protagonist, Li Xunhuan (李尋歡), comes from a scholarly family: he, his brother, and their father had taken the imperial examination and attained the position of tanhua (探花). In his early years, Li Xunhuan had served as a government official, but had since resigned and redirected his attention to martial arts. After some time, he becomes famous in the jianghu for his mastery of a dagger-throwing technique called the "Little Li Flying Dagger".

Li Xunhuan is in love with Lin Shiyin (林詩音) but has decided to give up his love for her to repay the kindness he received from his sworn brother, Long Xiaoyun (龍嘯雲), who also loves Lin Shiyin. He intentionally indulges in women and alcohol to distance himself from Lin Shiyin. When Long Xiaoyun and Lin Shiyin get married, Li Xunhuan gives his residence and family fortune to Lin Shiyin as her dowry and leaves to lead a reclusive life.

Over a decade later, Li Xunhuan is drawn back into the jianghu and accused of being the mysterious "Plum Flower Bandit" who is behind several robberies. He meets Lin Shiyin again, along with a swordsman Ah-fei, whom he befriends, and a woman called Sun Xiaohong (孫小紅), whom he eventually marries. With Ah-fei's help, he clears his name and uncovers the bandit's true identity. At the same time, he is drawn into a complex feud involving three key jianghu figures: his sworn brother Long Xiaoyun; Shangguan Jinhong (上官金虹), the evil chief of the Money Gang; and Shangguan Jinhong's lover, Lin Xian'er (林仙兒). Li Xunhuan ultimately defeats Shangguan Jinhong before marrying Sun Xiaohong and retiring from the jianghu once more.

=== Biancheng Langzi ===
Biancheng Langzi (邊城浪子), literally Bordertown Wanderer, was first published as a serial from February to September 1972 in the Hong Kong magazine Wuxia Chunqiu (武俠春秋). It was republished in October 1973 as a novel by Nan Qi Publishing House (南琪出版社) in Taiwan.

19 years earlier, Bai Tianyu (白天羽), a martial arts master, and his entire family were murdered, and the case has remained a mystery. Years later, Fu Hongxue (傅红雪), a taciturn young man raised to believe he is Bai Tianyu's son, sets out to avenge his father under his foster mother's instruction. His target is Ma Kongqun (馬空群), a perpetrator of the massacre who is now the powerful leader of a martial arts sect. Near the border town where Ma Kongqun is based, Fu Hongxue gets entangled in escalating conflicts among rival martial arts sects.

At the same time, the wandering swordsman Ye Kai (葉開), Li Xunhuan's apprentice, appears in the town and quietly investigates the case. He discovers that the massacre was a coordinated act by multiple jianghu figures who held personal grudges against Bai Tianyu.

As events reach a climax, Ma Kongqun is killed, but not by Fu Hongxue. The truth behind the protagonists' identities is also revealed: Fu Hongxue is not Bai Tianyu's son although he was raised to avenge Bai Tianyu; Ye Kai is actually Bai Tianyu's son but he has given up seeking vengeance. Realising the futility of hatred, Fu Hongxue abandons his quest and retires from the jianghu, bringing the longstanding vendetta to an end.

=== Jiuyue Yingfei ===
Jiuyue Yingfei (九月鷹飛), literally Eagle Soaring in the Ninth Month, was first published in 1973 by Nan Qi Publishing House (南琪出版社). It continues from after the events of Duoqing Jianke Wuqing Jian, where Li Xunhuan had defeated and killed Shangguan Jinhong, the evil chief of the Money Gang.

Shangguan Xiaoxian (上官小仙), the daughter of Shangguan Jinhong and Lin Xian'er, has inherited her father's wealth and collection of martial arts manuals. Beautiful in appearance but seemingly slow-witted with the mind of a seven-year-old, she has become the target of many people in the jianghu who are after her inheritance.

Li Xunhuan's apprentice, Ye Kai, takes Shangguan Xiaoxian under his care and escorts her to Chang'an. He keeps her hidden to protect her, but her location is leaked out. Suspecting something amiss, Ye Kai sets a trap and discovers that Shangguan Xiaoxian has actually pretending to be stupid to put him off guard. All this while, she has been manipulating him into helping her eliminate her potential rivals in the jianghu so that she can restore the Money Gang to power. Ye Kai confronts Shangguan Xiaoxian and defeats her in a duel.

=== Tianya Mingyue Dao ===
Tianya Mingyue Dao (天涯‧明月‧刀), literally Horizon, Bright Moon, Saber, was published from April to June 1974 as a serial in the China Times in Taiwan before it was cut off halfway. It was then published again in the Hong Kong magazine Wuxia Chunqiu (武俠春秋) from June 1974 to January 1975. In 1974, it was published as a novel by Nan Qi Publishing House (南琪出版社).

The novel follows Fu Hongxue, a character first introduced in Biancheng Langzi. He meets the swordsman Yan Nanfei (燕南飛) and learns of a "Fame List" created by Gongzi Yu (公子羽), an influential figure in the jianghu, on which both Fu Hongxue and Yan Nanfei are ranked. Soon after, Yan Nanfei is poisoned while Fu Hongxue becomes the target of repeated assassination attempts, hinting that there is a plot to eliminate those on the list.

While seeking a legendary projectile weapon known as the Peacock Tassel (孔雀翎), Fu Hongxue meet the weapon's owner, Qiu Shuiqing (秋水清). When the weapon is stolen, Qiu Shuiqing commits suicide in shame after entrusting his mistress, Zhuo Yuzhen (卓玉貞), to Fu Hongxue's care. As Fu Hongxue fends off his pursuers, he encounters more betrayals and ambushes, and those close to him are gradually eliminated.

Fu Hongxue eventually learns that Zhuo Yuzhen is allied with his enemies, and that the attacks on him were orchestrated by Gongzi Yu. Driven to despair and violence, he confronts Gongzi Yu and uncovers the truth: Yan Nanfei had been serving as a decoy for Gongzi Yu, while the real Gongzi Yu is an aged man seeking a successor to carry on his ambition of unifying the jianghu. After defeating Yan Nanfei, Fu Hongxue rejects Gongzi Yu's offer to serve as his next decoy, and instead chooses to retire from the jianghu.

=== Feidao, Youjian Feidao ===
Feidao, Youjian Feidao (飛刀，又見飛刀), literally Flying Dagger, Flying Dagger Appears Again, was first published from February to May 1981 as a serial in United Daily News, and as a novel by Wan Sheng Publishing House (萬盛出版社) in the same year. As Gu Long's right hand was injured in an incident at Yinsongge in Beitou District in 1980, he had to dictate the novel while his protégé, Ding Qing (丁情), wrote for him.

The protagonist of this novel is Li Huai (李壞), Li Xunhuan's grandson. Li Huai is an illegitimate child since his father had a secret affair with Shangguan Xiaoxian's sister. He inherits his grandfather's weapon and skills, as well as his maternal grandfather's wealth. While roaming the jianghu, he meets Xue Caiyue (薛採月), whom he falls in love with. However, they turn out to be star-crossed lovers because Li Huai's father had killed Xue Caiyue's father in a duel many years ago. Xue Caiyue is forced to settle the feud in a duel with Li Huai.

== Adaptations ==
=== Films ===
Year	Title	Main cast	Notes
1977	The Sentimental Swordsman	Ti Lung, Derek Yee, Ching Li, Candice Yu, Ngok Wah	
1979	A Sword Shot at the Sun	Meng Fei, David Chiang, Yang Chun-chun, Chang Fu-chien	
1981	Return of the Sentimental Swordsman	Ti Lung, Derek Yee, Ching Li, Alexander Fu, Lo Lieh, Ku Feng	
1981	Eagle Flying in September	Meng Fei, Ling Yun, Yang Chun-chun	
1981	Fei Dao You Jian Fei Dao	David Chiang, Flora Cheung, Hwang Jang-lee, Norman Chui, Pamela Yang, Yasuaki Kurata, Bruce Leung	
1993	A Warrior's Tragedy	Ti Lung, Anita Yuen, Frankie Chan, Idy Chan	
2000	The Legend of the Flying Swordsman	Dave Wang, Gigi Lai, Sonny Chiba	

=== Television series ===
Year	Title	Main cast	Notes
1978	The Romantic Swordsman	Paul Chu, Wong Yuen-sun, Wong Hang-sau, Maggie Li, Ko Miu-see	
1978	The Romantic Swordsman II	Paul Chu, Wong Yuen-sun, Wong Hang-sau, Wan Lau-mei, Susanna Au-yeung, Chang Chung	
1978	The Gold Dagger Romance	Yu Tien-lung, Carol Cheng, Candice Yu	
1982	Xiao Li Fei Dao	Wei Ziyun, Wang Meili, Liao Lijun, Chen Meixiu, Zhang Fujian, Chang Feng, Lei Hong, Lu Yilong	
1984	The Fallen Family	Leslie Cheung, Maggie Cheung, Patrick Tse, Lisa Lui	
1985	Tin Ai Ming Yu Do	Pat Poon, Law Lok-lam, Sum Sum	
1986	Condor in September	Damian Lau, Bonnie Ngai, Katie Chan	
1989	The Legend of Fu Hung Suet	Austin Wai, Chan Hiu-ying, Lau Wun-fung, Savio Tsang, Henry Lo	
1990	Duo Qing Jian Ke	Yu Jian, An Yi, Deng Xiaoou, Zhang Jian, Guo Feng, Zhao Chenhong	
1991	The Black Sabre	Cheung Siu-fai, Margie Tsang, Hugo Ng	
1995	The Romantic Swordsman	Eddie Kwan, Gigi Fu, Emily Kwan, Chin Kar-lok	
1999	Legend of Dagger Li	Vincent Chiao, Wu Jing, Alyssa Chia, Stephanie Hsiao, Faye Yu, Zheng Jiaxin	
2002	Fei Dao Wen Qing	Vincent Chiao, Zhang Yan, Xiu Qing, Niu Li, Jin Qiaoqiao, Yuan Wenkang	
2003	Flying Daggers	Julian Cheung, Ruby Lin, Dong Jie	
2008	Xiao Li Fei Dao	Huang Ziteng, Chen Xi, Huang Minye, Zhang Ruila, Liu Ying, Chai Mingyang, Norman Chui, Wang Yining, Ngo Ka-nin	
2012	The Magic Blade	Wallace Chung, Lemon Zhang, Baron Chen	
2016	Bordertown Prodigal	Zhu Yilong, Zhang Xinyu, Zhang Junning	
2017	The Legend of Flying Daggers	Hawick Lau, Yang Rong, Emma Wu, Kenny Kwan, Huang Youming, Yuan Bingyan, Yang Mingna, Yan Yikuan, Howie Huang, He Zhonghua	
