= The Blood Brothers (1973 film) =

1973 Hong Kong film by Chang Cheh

- Hong Kong film poster
- Directed by: Chang Cheh
- Screenplay by: Ni Kuang; Chang Cheh
- Produced by: Run Run Shaw
- Starring: David Chiang; Ti Lung; Chen Kuan Tai; Ching Li
- Cinematography: Yukio Miyaki
- Edited by: Kuo Ting-hung
- Music by: Frankie Chan
- Production company: Shaw Brothers Studio
- Release date: 24 February 1973 (Hong Kong)
- Running time: 122 minutes
- Country: Hong Kong
- Language: Mandarin

The Blood Brothers (Traditional: 刺馬; Simplified: 刺马; Pinyin: Cì Mǎ) is a 1973 Hong Kong martial arts film directed by Chang Cheh. Godfrey Ho was assistant director in this movie (as Ho Chih Kuang).

== Plot ==
The Blood Brothers follows two aimless bandits Chang Wen Hsiang (David Chiang) and Huang Chang (Chen Kuan-tai) who attempt to rob Ma Xinyi (Ti Lung). Unable to defeat him, they join forces and are soon thrashing hoodlums and even taking over a nearby group of bandits. But soon it becomes apparent Ma's ambitions far out reach those of his friends, as he seeks a position in local government through the Imperial Examination.

Having left them behind they meet again. Now a general, Ma is not about to let anything stand in the way of his goals - which now include defeating the 'long hair' bandits and courting Huang's wife Mi Lan (Ching Li). The attraction is mutual, with her seeing the potential of this ambitious man. Whilst Chang and Huang are off fighting the bandits, Ma and Mi have an affair, and he arranges for Huang to be assassinated rather than let his position fall into disgrace.

As Chang recounts his tale to the local Marshall, held for the murder of his blood brother, Ma, the inevitability of his fate is always clear. After Ma's men take their revenge, Mi Lan is left alone to reflect over the good times and, conversely, all the strife she's caused.

== Release ==
The Blood Brothers was released in Hong Kong on February 24, 1973.

== Reception ==
At the 11th Golden Horse Awards, Ti Lung won the Special Award for Outstanding Performance for his work in The Blood Brothers.

From a contemporary reviews, Tony Rayns (Monthly Film Bulletin) stated that the film was "the least romantic of Chang Cheh's evocations of heroism in unheroic times". Rayns commented that this film was "the first time that Chang Cheh and his regular collaborator [Ni Kuang] have found a plot mechanism to express the oppression as compulsive as the variations on the hero-model. They are well served by their admirable cast, several of them playing against established type; and barring the odd anarchronism, the dubbing is for once excellent."

== Aftermath and influence ==
The story of the film was also done in Peter Chan's film The Warlords (2007). Chan has stated that although The Blood Brothers was an influence, he denied that the film was a remake and changed the title of his film to avoid comparisons.
