= David Chiang =

Hong Kong actor, director and producer

- 姜大衛
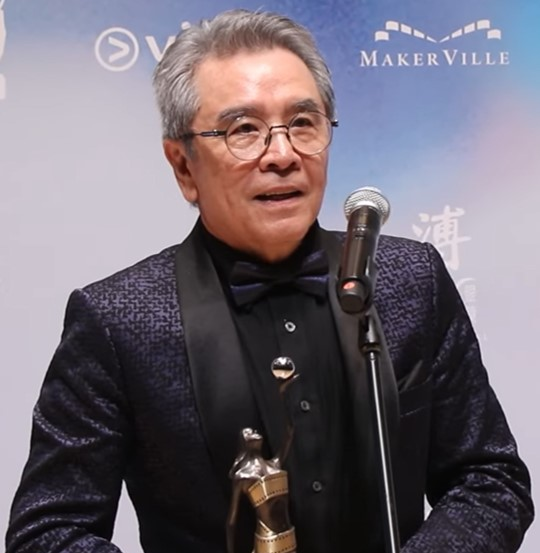
- Chiang interviewed by the press after winning the 42nd Hong Kong Film Awards for Best Supporting Actor by In Broad Daylight on 14 April 2024
- Born: Chiang Wei-nien (姜偉年); 29 June 1947 (age 79); Shanghai, Republic of China
- Other name: John Chiang
- Occupations: Actor; director; producer
- Years active: 1952–1963, 1967–2000, 2003–present
- Spouse: Maggie Lee (m. 1974)
- Children: 3
- Relatives: Paul Chun (brother); Derek Yee (half-brother); Raymond Cho (son-in-law)
- Awards: Asia-Pacific Film Festival; Best Actor; 1970 Vengeance; 1973 Blood Brothers

Chinese name
- Traditional Chinese: 姜大衛
- Simplified Chinese: 姜大卫
Transcriptions
Standard Mandarin
- Hanyu Pinyin: Jiāng Dàwèi
Yue: Cantonese
- Jyutping: Goeng^{1} Daai^{6}-wai^{6}

Chiang Wei-nien
- Traditional Chinese: 姜偉年
- Simplified Chinese: 姜伟年
Transcriptions
Standard Mandarin
- Hanyu Pinyin: Jiāng Wěinián
Yue: Cantonese
- Jyutping: Goeng^{1} Wai^{5}-nin^{4}

David Chiang Tai-wai (born 29 June 1947) is a Hong Kong actor, director, producer and martial artist. A well-known martial arts actor formerly from Shaw Brothers Studio in the 1970s, he has appeared in over 130 films and 30 television series.

== Early life ==
Chiang was born in Shanghai, China on 29 June 1947. Chiang's mother Hung Wei (紅薇; Hóng Wēi; Hung4 Mei4) (real name: Lo Chen 羅珍), and father Yan Fa (嚴化) (real name: Chiang Ko-chi) were popular Chinese movie stars who moved to Hong Kong in the late 1940s during the Chinese Civil War. He has an older brother Paul Chun and a half-brother Derek Yee.

== Career ==
At age four, Chiang began his acting career as a child actor. In 1966, while working as a stuntman and fight instructor for the Shaw Brothers Studio, Chiang was spotted by director Chang Cheh, who immediately saw his potential and screen presence, and became his mentor. Chang gave him the stage name David Chiang, even though his real English name was John.

With Wang Yu's sudden departure in 1969, Run Run Shaw and his senior executives were looking for a new leading man and made Chiang an offer. In 1970, under Chang Cheh's guidance, Chiang won the Best Actor award at the 16th Asia-Pacific Film Festival for his role in Vengeance. In 1972, at the 18th Asia-Pacific Film Festival, he won the Best Actor for his role in Blood Brothers. In 1973, at the 19th Asia-Pacific Film Festival, he won the Most Contemporary award for his role in The Generation Gap.

In 1973 Chiang left Hong Kong with his mentor Chang Cheh and set up an independent production company called Chang's Scope Company. With the help of Run Run Shaw, their films continued to be distributed through Shaw's channels. At Chang's Scope Company, Chiang worked as a director, producer, and screenwriter. As the 1970s came to an end and the 1980s approached, Chiang continued acting, working with directors Lee Han Chiang, Hsueh Li Pao, Ho Meng-hua, and Chia-Liang Liu. In 1980 he made his television debut in The Green Dragon Conspiracy, followed by Princess Chang Ping and Dynasty. In the mid-1980s, Chiang worked with his brothers, Paul Chun and Derek Yee, directing, producing and acting in the comedy Legend of the Owl. Chiang also acted in other comedy movies such as The Challenger and The Loot, directed by Eric Tseng. In the late 1980s into the early 1990s Chiang directed the movies Heaven Can Help, Silent Love, The Wrong Couples, Mr. Handsome, Double Fattiness, My Dear Son, Will of Iron, and Mother of a Different Kind. Since 2000 he has continued to work in movies and TV series, including Election, Daisy, Revolving Doors of Vengeance, Lethal Weapons of Love and Passion, Land of Wealth, The Family Link and the 2007 television series The Gem of Life. He was nominated for Best Supporting Actor in 2006 for his role in the TVB series Revolving Doors of Vengeance.

In 2004, Chiang was inducted into The Avenue of Stars, which honours celebrities of the Hong Kong film industry. It is located along the Victoria Harbour waterfront in Tsim Sha Tsui, Hong Kong and modeled on the Hollywood Walk of Fame.

== Personal life ==
On 20 January 1974, Chiang married Maggie Lee Lam Lam (李琳琳), an actress. Chiang and his wife have three children: Elaine Chiang (b. 1974), who is married to actor Raymond Cho; Eve Chiang (b. 1983); and John Chiang, Jr. (b. 1995).

He currently lives in Vancouver, Canada with his family, but returns to Hong Kong to film movies and television dramas.

== Filmography ==
=== Films ===
Year	Title	Role	Notes/Ref.
1952	The Closer the Better (近水樓台)		
1953	Green Heaven (碧雲天)		
1954	Return (歸來)	Siao-ming	
1956	Blind Love (盲戀)		
1956	The Orphan Girl (梅姑)		
1957	A Mellow Spring (春光無限好)		
1957	Little Angel of the Streets (馬路小天使)		
1958	The Blessed Family (全家福)		
1958	Young Vagabond (流浪兒)		
1959	The Kingdom and the Beauty (江山美人)		
1960	Street Boys (街童)		
1960	Twilight Hours (曉風殘月)		
1960	Kiss Me Again (第二吻)		
1960	The Orphan in Distress (苦海孤雛)		
1961	Till the Clouds Roll by (雲開見月明)		
1961	The Search of Loved One (萬里尋親記)	Orphan Ngau	
1962	Ladies First (好事成雙)		
1962	Unspeakable Truths (有口難言)		
1963	The Lady and the Thief (女人與小偷)		
1967	Lady in Distress: The Invincible Fighter (無敵女殺手)		
1967	The Black Killer (黑殺星)	Extra	
1968	Golden Swallow (金燕子)		
1968	Blue Falcon (藍鷹)		
1968	Red Lamp Shaded in Blood (血影紅燈)		Extra
1968	The White Dragon (飛俠小白龍)		Extra
1968	The Sword of Swords (神刀)		
1968	The Silver Fox (玉面飛狐)		
1968	Spring Morning Flying Cloud (春曉雲開)		
1969	Dead End (死角)	David Liao Ching-Shui	
1969	Have Sword, Will Travel (保鏢)	Lo Yi	
1969	The Invincible Fist (鐵手無情)		
1969	The Flying Dagger (飛刀手)		
1969	Return of the One-Armed Swordsman (獨臂刀王)	Yin	
1970	The Heroic Ones (十三太保)	Li Cunxiao	
1970	The Singing Killer (小煞星)		
1970	Vengeance (報仇)	Guan Xiaolou	
1970	The Wandering Swordsman (遊俠兒)		
1970	The Winged Tiger (插翅虎)		
1970	The Secret of the Dirk (大羅劍俠)		
1971	The Anonymous Heroes (無名英雄)		
1971	The Deadly Duo (雙俠)		
1971	Duel of Fists (拳擊)		
1971	King Eagle (鷹王)		
1971	The Duel (大決鬥)		
1971	New One-Armed Swordsman (新獨臂刀)		
1972	Angry Guest (惡客)		
1972	Boxer from Shantung (馬永貞)		
1972	Four Riders (四騎士)		
1972	Trilogy of Swordsmanship (群英會)	Mu Yuqi	Part 3: "White Water Strand" (白水灘)
1972	The Water Margin (水滸傳)	Yan Qing	
1972	Young People (年輕人)		
1973	Blood Brothers (刺馬)		
1973	The Generation Gap (叛逆)		
1973	The Pirate (大海盜)	General Wu Yee	
1974	The Two Faces of Love (小孩與狗)		
1974	Five Shaolin Masters (少林五祖)		
1974	Friends (朋友)		
1974	The Savage Five (五虎將)		
1974	The Legend of the 7 Golden Vampires		
1975	All Men Are Brothers (蕩寇誌)	Yan Qing	
1975	The Empress Dowager (傾國傾城)		
1975	The Imposter (七面人)		
1975	The Taxi Driver (的士大佬)		
1975	Temperament of Life (嬉笑怒罵)		
1975	The Young Rebel (後生)		
1976	The Condemned (死囚)		Also director
1976	The One-Armed Swordsmen (獨臂雙雄)		Also director
1976	7-Man Army (八道樓子)		
1976	Shaolin Temple (少林寺)		
1977	Death Duel (三少爺的劍)		
1977	Judgment of an Assassin (決殺令)		
1977	Magnificent Wanderers (江湖漢子)		
1977	The Naval Commandos (海軍突擊隊)		
1977	Whirlwind Kick (旋風踢)		
1977	Strife for Mastery (水月門)		
1978	Shaolin Handlock (十字鎖喉手)		
1978	Shaolin Mantis (螳螂)		
1978	The Red Phoenix (火鳳凰)		
1978	Sensual Pleasures (子曰:食色性也)		
1979	Abbot of Shaolin (少林英雄榜)		
1979	Blooded Treasury Fight (血肉磨坊)		
1979	The Challenger (踢館)		
1979	The King of Fists and Dollars (王拳王鍰)		
1979	Murder Plot (孔雀王朝)		
1979	A Sword Shot at the Sun (一劍刺向太陽)		
1980	Heaven and Hell Gate (第三類打鬥)		
1980	The Loot (賊贓)		
1980	Fight for Glory (絕代英雄)		
1980	The Lost Kung Fu Secrets (鈑公雞)		
1980	Six Directions of Boxing (六合八法)		
1981	The Legend of the Owl (貓頭鷹)		Also director
1981	Night of the Assassins (刺客列傳)		
1981	Red Phoenix		
1981	Yee Dang Bing Chuk Chap (二等兵續集)		
1981	Return of the Deadly Blade (飛刀‧又見飛刀)		
1981	Funny Soldier (傻兵立大功)		
1982	Play Con Game (十張王牌)		
1982	The Challenger (彈指神功)		
1982	Strife for Mastery		
1982	Till Death Do We Scare (小生怕怕)		
1983	Play Catch (少爺威威)		
1983	Sword with the Windbell (風鈴中的刀聲)		
1984	Heaven Can Help (上天救命)		
1984	Shanghai 13 (上海灘十三太保)		
1985	Twinkle Twinkle Lucky Stars (夏日福星)		Cameo
1985	Yes Madam (皇家師姐)		
1986	Soul (老娘夠騷)		
1986	From Here to Prosperity (奪寶計上計)		
1986	Where's Office Tuba? (霹靂大喇叭)		
1987	Angel (天使行動)		
1987	It's a Mad, Mad, Mad World (富貴逼人)	John	
1987	The Wrong Couples (不是冤家不聚頭)		
1988	Double Fattiness (雙肥臨門)	Cameo, Also director	
1988	Tiger on Beat (老虎出更)		
1988	The Revenge Ghost of the Tree (林投姐)		
1989	Just Heroes (義膽群英)		
1989	Mr. Sunshine (開心巨無霸)		
1991	Will of Iron (黑雪)		Also director
1991	The Banquet (豪門夜宴)		Cameo
1992	Mary From Beijing (夢醒時分)		
1992	Once Upon a Time in China II (黃飛鴻之二男兒當自強)	Luk Hou-dung	
1992	The Twin Dragons (雙龍會)		
1994	What Price Survival ('94獨臂刀之情)		
1995	The Adventurers (大冒險家)		
1999	The Legend of Speed (烈火戰車2極速傳說)		
2003	Star Runner (少年阿虎)		
2005	Election (黑社會)		
2005	2 Young (早熟)		
2006	Daisy (데이지)		
2009	Look for a Star (遊龍戲鳳)		
2012	Love on Gallery Bridge (愛在廊橋)	Lin Fukun	
2013	The Rooftop (天台)		
2014	Kung Fu Jungle (一個人的武林)	Master Chan Pak-Kwong	
2015	From Vegas to Macau II	Victor	
2016	From Vegas to Macau III	Victor	
2017	20:16		
2019	Jade Dynasty 诛仙	Cangsong Daoren	
2025	LUZ 《花明渡》	Mr. Qiu	

=== Film (as director) ===
- The Drug Addict (1974)
- A Mad World of Fools (1974)
- The One-Armed Swordsmen (1976)
- The Condemned (1976)
- Whirlwind Kick (1977)
- The Legend of the Owl (1981)
- Heaven Can Help (1984)
- Silent Love (1986)
- Mr. Handsome (1987)
- The Wrong Couples (1987)
- Double Fattiness (1988)
- My Dear Son (1989)
- When East Meets West (1990)
- Will of Iron (1991)
- Mother of a Different Kind (1995)

=== Television dramas ===
Year	Network	Title	Role	Notes
1980	RTV	Dynasty (大內群英)	Cang Zang	
1981	RTV	Princess Cheung Ping (武俠帝女花)	Jyun Joek-fei	
1982	RTV	The Green Dragon Conspiracy (琥珀青龍)	Ziu Hin	
1982	ATV	The Conqueror (雄霸天下)		
1982	TTV	The Return of Swords Lady Riding West on White Horse (白馬嘯西風)	Ma Jiajun	
1984	TTV	Jagged Generals of the Yang Family (鐵血楊家將)	Liu Tianchi	
1992	TTV	Ma's Assassination (刺馬)	Ma Xinyi	
1993	TVB	The Mystery of the Condor Hero (射鵰英雄傳之九陰真經)	Wong Yeuk-see	
1994	TVB	Fate of the Clairvoyant (再見亦是老婆)		
1995	TVB	The Fist of Law (大捕快)		
1995	TVB	A Good Match from Heaven (天降奇緣)		
1996	ATV	The Snow is Red (雪花神劍)	Luo Xuan	
1998	ATV	A Lawyer Can Be Good (流氓·律師)		
1998	TVB	War and Remembrance (乾隆大帝)		
1999	CETV	The Love Story in the Fantasyland (鏡花緣傳奇)		
2000	ATV	Hong Kong Police (非常好警)		
2000	CTV	State of Divinity (笑傲江湖)	Qu Yang	
2000	ATV	Wonder Bar (快活谷)		
2005	TVB	Wong Fei Hung - Master of Kung Fu (我師傅係黃飛鴻)	Wong Kei-ying	
2005	TVB	Revolving Doors of Vengeance (酒店風雲)	Cheung Wing-fat	Nominated - TVB Award for Best Supporting Actor (Top 5)
2006	TVB	Lethal Weapons of Love and Passion (覆雨翻雲)	Long Fan-wun	
2006	TVB	Face to Fate (布衣神相)	Sum Sing-nam	
2006	TVB	Land of Wealth (滙通天下)	Kiu Bun-yip	Nominated - TVB Award for Best Supporting Actor (Top 20)
2007	TVB	The Family Link (師奶兵團)	Ko Wing-kuen	Nominated - TVB Award for My Favourite Male Character (Top 24)
2007	Mediacorp	Making Miracles (奇迹)	Chen Guanlin	
2008	TVB	The Master of Tai Chi (太極)	Mo Chik	
2008-2009	TVB	The Gem of Life (珠光寶氣)	Hong Ching-yeung	
2009	TVB	The Threshold of a Persona (ID精英)	Mak Kai-ming	
2009	TVB	A Chip Off the Old Block (巴不得爸爸 ... )	Cho Tsuen	Nominated - Best Supporting Actor (Top 15)
2009		Room to Let I (有房出租)	Li Linlin	
2010		Room to Let II (有房出租II)	Li Linlin	
2011	TVB	Men with No Shadows (不速之約)	Tong King-tin	
2011	TVB	Grace Under Fire (女拳)	Wong Fei-hung	Nominated - Mingpao's 43rd Anniversary Award
2012	TVB	Gambler (賭海迷徒)	Chuen	Episode 7: "Fight for Your Life" (搏老命)
2012		Her Whole Life (她的一生)	Li Datong	
2012	HBS	The Magic Blade (天涯明月刀)	Xiang Yingtian	
2014	HBS	The Loving Home (把爱带回家)	Xia Lieyang	
2015	HKTV	Incredible Mama	Chung Hok-saang	
2015	RCTI	Preman Pensiun	'Kang Saef	
2015	HKTV	The Wicked League		
2015	HKTV	Hidden Faces (三面形醫)		
2017	TVB	My Ages Apart (誇世代)	Sung Lai	
2018	TVB	Birth of a Hero (翻生武林)	Ren Wofei	
2018	TVB	Daddy Cool (逆緣)	He Heping	
2019	TVB	Big White Duel (白色強人)	Dr. Lui Chung-hok	Nominated — TVB Anniversary Award for Best Supporting Actor
2020	TVB	Of Greed and Ants	Mah Sing Leih/ Sing Suk / Sing Jay Guest Role	
2020	TVB	On-Lie Game (迷網)	Szeto Cham	
2020	TVB	Al Cappuccino (反黑路人甲)	So Wai-sun	Nominated — TVB Anniversary Award for Best Supporting Actor
2021	TVB	The Forgotten Day (失憶24小時)	Mung Kwan-sui	Nominated — TVB Anniversary Award for Best Supporting Actor; Nominated — TVB Anniversary Award for Most Popular Male Character
2022	TVB	Stranger Anniversary (雙生陌生人)	Lee Kwun-hang	
2022	TVB	Touch the Sky (究竟天有多高)	Wing Kit	Nominated — TVB Anniversary Award for Best Actor; Nominated — TVB Anniversary Award for Most Popular Male Character; Nominated — TVB Anniversary Awards for Favourite TVB Actor in Malaysia
2022	TVB	Big White Duel II (白色強人II)	Dr. Lui Chung-hok	
2022	TVB	The Beauty of War (美麗戰場)	Pong Kwok-tung	Nominated — TVB Anniversary Award for Best Supporting Actor; Nominated — TVB Anniversary Award for Most Popular Male Character
2023	TVB	My Pet, My Angel (寵愛 Pet Pet)	Kam Ching-chung	
TBA		Flying Swords of Dragon Gate (龍門飛甲)		
Filming	TVB	Big Biz Duel (企業強人)	Ying Man-ho	

== Gallery ==
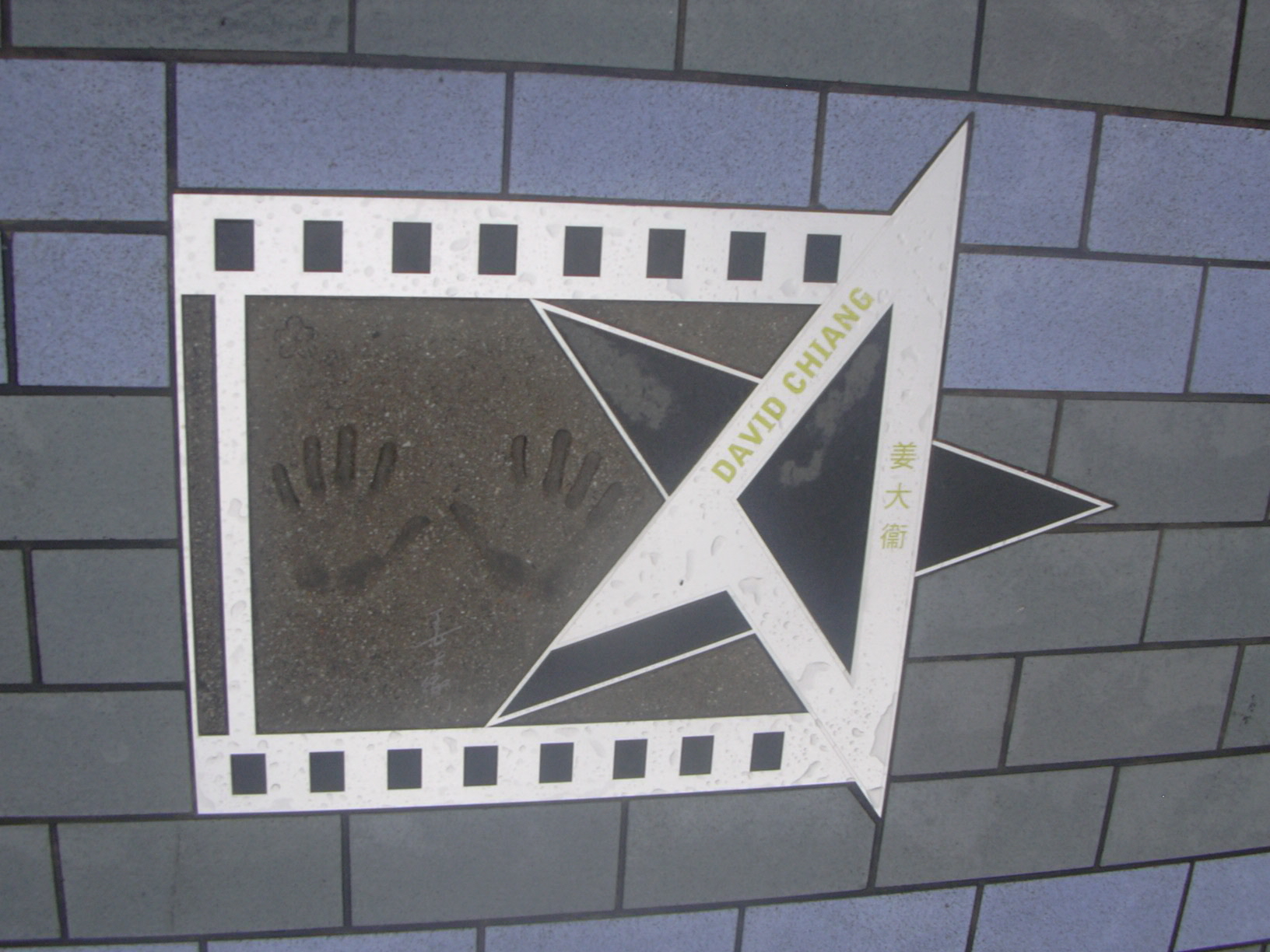
Chiang's hand prints and autograph on the Avenue of Stars, Hong Kong
