= Reactions to the 2019–2020 Hong Kong protests =

This is a list of domestic and international reactions to the 2019–2020 Hong Kong protests.

== Local responses ==
=== Government ===
After some in Hong Kong, Taiwan and several foreign envoys voiced concerns about the bill and before the protests, Carrie Lam had insisted that the bill would be "beneficial", as it could "protect Hong Kong's public safety, and fulfil Hong Kong's international duty". Lam accused pan-democrats in the Legislative Council of "talking trash" in their opposition. Secretary John Lee had said the legal sector did not really understand the bill, and some had not read the bill before protesting. Chief Secretary for Administration Matthew Cheung said that the turnout rate in the April protest is not a key determining factor for the government to consider and added that fixing the loopholes in the existing extradition law was necessary.

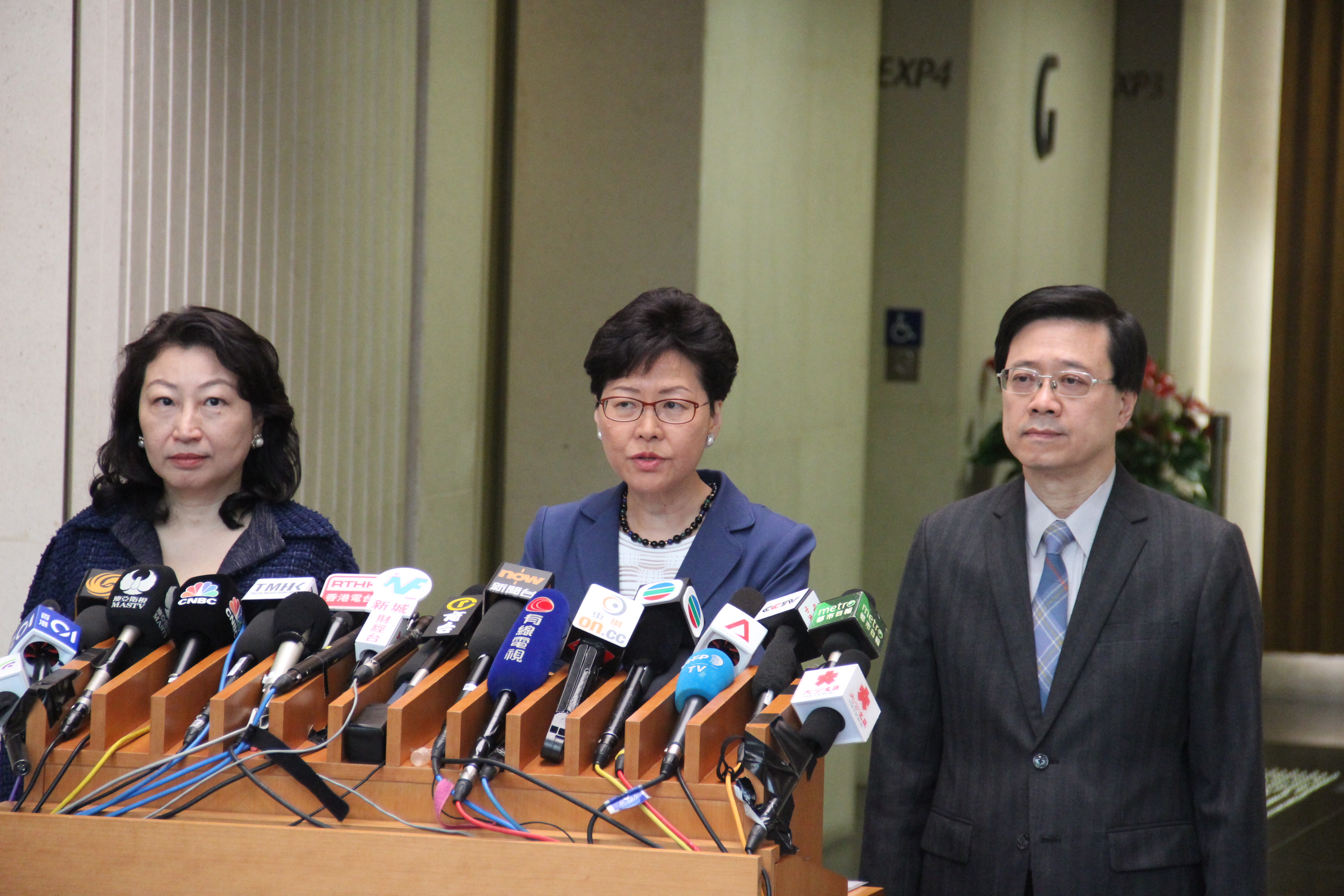
Chief Executive Carrie Lam at the press conference with Secretary for Justice Teresa Cheng and Secretary for Security John Lee one day after the massive protest on 10 June.

The government maintained its hardline approach after the 9 June protest which attracted one million people. Carrie Lam continued to push for the bill's second reading on 12 June despite huge opposition and continued to defend the bill, saying that the government was "duty-bound" to do so. Following the 12 June conflict, both Police Commissioner Stephen Lo and Lam characterised the conflict as a "riot", which angered protesters, who then demanded the government retract the term. The police later backed down on the claim, saying that among the protesters, only five of them rioted. The CHRF disagreed and maintained the position that none of them rioted. The demand urging the government to retract the riot categorisation has since been included in the protesters' list of demands.

On 15 June, Lam suspended the bill, but insisted that the rationale for the amendment was sound and that she would do more work in explaining the bill. She refused to apologise or resign for forcing the bill through the Legislative Council, which led to subsequent violent conflicts and created rifts among Hong Kong people. However, following the huge protest on the next day, she "sincerely" apologised to the public, but maintained that she would not resign or withdraw the bill, as she wished to continue leading the government. The former president of the Legislative Council, Andrew Wong Wang-fat, criticised her use of the term "suspension", as the term does not exist in LegCo's Rules of Procedure.

During the 1 July celebration of the 22nd anniversary of the establishment of HKSAR, Lam declared that she would reach out to young people and meet with individuals from all walks of life to listen to their demands. However, when the protesters stormed the Legislative Council Complex that day, she refused to meet the protesters and held a press conference at 4 am on 2 July condemning the protesters' "use of extreme violence" and refusing to respond to questions that concerned the recent suicides that had been associated with her promotion of the bill. Her reaction drew criticisms from Hong Kong Free Press, who accused her of caring more about "shards of glass being broken than the lives of several citizens in Hong Kong". Following the protest, Carrie Lam invited representatives from public universities to attend a closed-door meeting, however the representatives rejected such request, calling her "insincere" and the invitation a "public relations act". They insisted that the meeting must be held publicly, as they did not represent all the protesters in the movement.

On 9 July, Carrie Lam declared that "the bill [was] dead" and that previous attempts to amend the law had failed completely. She gave assurances that the government had ceased any work to amend the bill but stopped short of withdrawing it. She also rejected setting up an independent commission to investigate the police conduct during the protests, saying that the existing mechanism, the Independent Police Complaints Council, would suffice. While pro-Beijing lawmakers agreed and claimed it was the time for Hong Kong people to "move on", opposition called Lam "insincere" and questioned her reluctance to formally withdraw the bill using the appropriate term. In the Cantonese version, she used the term "壽終正寢", which means "dying a peaceful death", to describe the bill amendment. However, some members of the public were sceptical about her usage of the term as it was ambiguous and accused her of playing a "translation trick".

At a meeting with the press after the 21 July protest, where protesters defaced the national emblem and mobs attacked commuters inside Yuen Long station, Lam denounced both the protesters and the white-clad group of attackers. She condemned the protesters who had defaced the national emblem for hurting the one country, two systems principle and national pride. When questioned on a government statement that the questioner regarded as a "mild description" of the Yuen Long attack, Lam said that the government had "not [been] in possession of [facts regarding] all the actual situation on the ground". When asked about whether the safety of citizens was more important than the defacing of the national emblem, Lam responded by saying that ensuring public safety was important, but she believed that citizens will agree that "it is important and maybe even more important that the 'one country, two systems' principle can continue to be successfully implemented".

On 6 August, following a citywide general strike and intense conflicts in various neighbourhoods in Hong Kong, Carrie Lam warned that the protesters were dragging Hong Kong to a "point of no return", and "gambling with the lives of 7 million people". She suggested that no concession would be made and that the protests no longer concerned the extradition bill or her poor governance, and were instead about challenging China's sovereignty and damaging "one country, two systems", seeing that protesters had chanted the slogan "liberate Hong Kong, the revolution of our times". Lam also announced that the Force would hold daily press conferences. On 9 August, when describing the protesters, she said that a "small minority of people... [don't] mind destroying Hong Kong" and that they had "no stake in society". Lam added that her cabinet would begin focusing on improving the city's economy and preparing measures to help the businesses in Hong Kong, while warning of an upcoming economic downturn.

Following a rally that was attended by more than 1.7 million people, Carrie Lam announced that she would create platforms for dialogue but continued to reject the five core demands. She also invited politicians including Henry Tang, Anthony Cheung, university principals including Stephen Cheung, Roland Chin, professor Yuen Kwok-yung and more to help build the platform, however, lawmaker Kenneth Leung suggested that protesters and academics were sceptical of this platform because they felt that whoever was building the platform may not be representative, and that protesters had articulated the five core demands clearly already.

On 2 September, Reuters received a leaked audio recording in which Carrie Lam admitted that she had "very limited" room to manoeuvre between the Central People's Government and Hong Kong, and that she would quit if she had a choice. The next day she told the media that she had never tendered her resignation.

On 4 September, Carrie Lam announced that she would formally withdraw the extradition bill, and introduce measures such as bringing new members to the Independent Police Complaints Council, engaging in dialogue at a community level and inviting academics to evaluate the deep-rooted problems of Hong Kong. However, protesters and democrats had previously expressed that a partial concession would not be accepted and affirmed that all the five core demands must be answered. Lam's concession was also criticised as "too little, too late". After withdrawing the bill, Lam added that "stern law enforcement" would be used to stop the protesters.

=== Pro-government parties ===
The Democratic Alliance for the Betterment and Progress of Hong Kong (DAB) and the Hong Kong Federation of Trade Unions (HKFTU) supported Carrie Lam's amendment of the bill before the mass protests broke out. After Lam announced the suspension of the bill, the views of many pro-government lawmakers U-turned. Starry Lee, the leader of the DAB, claimed that her party would not oppose the withdrawal of the bill and distanced itself from Ann Chiang, who claimed that the government could revive the bill after the summer. Lee disagreed with setting up an independent commission to investigate police behaviour, as she felt that it would "dampen their morale". Felix Chung, a lawmaker from Liberal Party, supported the withdrawal of the bill, though he felt that an independent commission should be set up to investigate the whole incident. The Chief Executive's Office held a private meeting with pro-government lawmakers explaining the decision to suspend the bill, though some lawmakers, including the HKFTU's Alice Mak, were said to have vented their anger toward Lam, as her decision may harm their chances in the upcoming elections. Abraham Shek supported the formation of an independent commission, thinking the problem could not be resolved through positive economic changes. He said that "their five demands did not mention that they want a house. The five demands of young people are that they want justice, fairness and transparency."

As protests continued to escalate, pro-Beijing lawmakers have condemned the use of violence by protesters, including breaking into the LegCo Complex and using petrol bombs and unidentified liquids against the police. They have maintained their support for the Hong Kong Police Force and have held various counter-demonstrations to support the police. On 17 August, a pro-government rally, organised by the Safeguard Hong Kong Alliance, occurred in Tamar Park. Organisers said 476,000 people, including pro-government politicians and business leaders, joined the demonstration, though police stated only 108,000 attended.

Members of the Executive Council Ip Kwok-him and Regina Ip alleged that there was a "mastermind" behind the protests but could not provide substantial evidence to support their claim. Fanny Law claimed that some young females had been offering "free sex" services to the hardline protesters without providing any evidence. Her claim was condemned as spreading fake news with malice.

=== Camp supporting protests ===
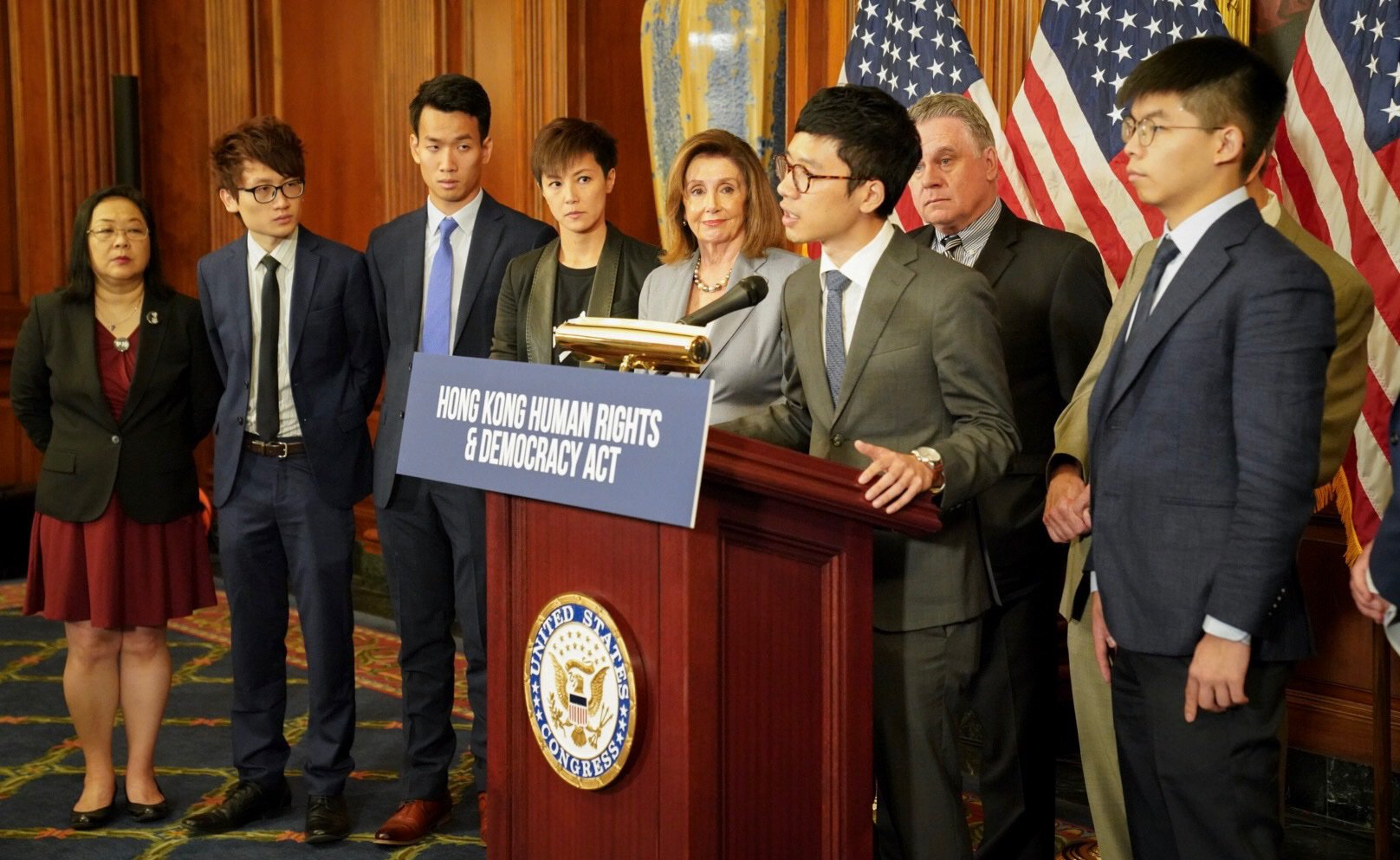
Activists including Joshua Wong and Nathan Law met House Democratic leader Nancy Pelosi and Representative Chris Smith at the US Congress.

The pro-democratic parties played a supporting role in the protests, and have opposed the amendment of the bill, criticising the Police Force for its alleged misconduct. Many lawmakers, such as Democratic Party's Roy Kwong, assisted the protesters in various scenarios. The Civic Party criticised the government for not responding to the protesters and described the storming of the LegCo as the "outburst of people's grievances". Responding to the escalation of the protests seen in mid-August at the airport, the convenor of the pro-democratic lawmakers, Claudia Mo, asserted that her group of lawmakers would not split with the protesters while disagreeing with some of their actions. Fernando Cheung warned that Hong Kong was slowly becoming a police state with increasing violence used by the police.

The incidents on both 21 July and 31 August were likened to terrorist attacks by some pro-democrats. Pro-democrats also criticised the arrests of several lawmakers before the 31 August protest, saying that such arrests were an attempt by the police to suppress the movement and warned that the police would further "fuel greater anger". The pan-democratic camp also condemned the violence directed at its protests' organisers, lawmakers and election candidates. Lo Kin-hei has accused the pro-Beijing camp and its supporters of committing the "most brutal physical violent acts" throughout the protests.

Several lawmakers, including Dennis Kwok and Alvin Yeung from Civic Party, also travelled to the US to explain and discuss the situation in Hong Kong with American lawmakers and business leaders, and to voice their support for the reintroduction of the Hong Kong Human Rights and Democracy Act. Joshua Wong, Denise Ho and several other democrats also provided testimonies during the US congressional hearing for the Democracy Act. Meanwhile, some councillors proposed several alternate versions of the extradition bill.

Former government executives, including Anson Chan, the former Chief Secretary for Administration, issued several open letters to Carrie Lam, urging her to respond to the five core demands raised by protesters. At the civil servant rally, Joseph Wong, the former Secretary for Civil Service, said, "If we think today's officials, today's chief executive, violated or failed to follow the rule of law, as civil servants and as civilians, we have a duty to point it out", responding to the current Secretary Joshua Law's letter to all civil servants which requested them to maintain their political neutrality.

=== Citizen responses ===
Data was collected to measure public opinion on the protests. The Chinese University of Hong Kong reported on public attitudes toward the protests from August to October. One author said that public opinion was "firmly on the side of the democracy movement's key demands." A poll conducted by the University of Hong Kong following the 16 June march found that the number of respondents who respectively identified as Hong Konger and Chinese were both at record lows since the 1997 handover while 90% of 3200 alumni supported an October 2019 motion that called for Lam's resignation.

In late October 2019, CNN and the South China Morning Post reported on sideline supporters and moderates who say they have been driven away by the violence because the protesters spread chaos, trash the economy, and hurt their own cause. Such critics, self-dubbed the "silent majority" and numbering in the hundreds of thousands, did not support the protesters' violence. On 19 November 2019, Foreign Policy suggested that the "silent majority" notion may be influenced by a disinformation campaign from Chinese state media and that support for the protests would be measured in local elections on 24 November 2019.

Despite the increase in violence, protesters largely maintained public support. During the 2019 Hong Kong local elections, democrats, who supported the protesters and their five demands, achieved a landslide victory, controlling 17 of the 18 District Councils of Hong Kong, tripling their number of seats from about 124 to around 388. Meanwhile, pro-Beijing parties suffered a historic defeat and lost more than 242 seats. Pro-Beijing leaders including Junius Ho, Horace Cheung, Vincent Cheng, Michael Tien, Holden Chow, Lau Kwok-fan, Luk Chung-hung, Ho Kai-ming and Alice Mak (all of which Legislative Councilors) were all defeated by democrats in their respective constituencies. Regina Ip's New People Party lost all of its seats.

Reuters conducted polls in December 2019, March 2020, June 2020 and August 2020. The last poll showed that an increasing number of Hongkongers supported the pro-democracy goals after the national security law was implemented. 60% opposed the law, up from 57% in June when few details were known. Support declined when asked "How much do you support or oppose the pro-democracy protest movement?" 44% said they supported the movement. In June 51% said they supported the protest movement although a different question was asked: "Generally speaking how much do you support or oppose de protest movement surrounding the extradition bill?". 70% wanted an independent commission of inquiry to investigate police handling of the protests, a 7% rise. 63% wanted universal suffrage, about the same as the June poll. Support for amnesty of all protesters rose to 50%, up 5% from June. The majority still wanted Lam to resign. Pro-democracy opponents declined to 19% from 21.5%. Furthermore, 60% still opposed Hong Kong independence, while 20% supported the idea. Just over 50% were unhappy about the postponed legislative council elections. The poll showed that opposition candidates could have done well if the elections were not postponed.

==== Mainlanders in Hong Kong ====
Since October 2019, some mainland Chinese living in Hong Kong expressed fears for their safety as a result of the protests; an NBC article opined that protesters' hatred towards mainland China had extended to Mandarin-speakers from Taiwan, Singapore, Malaysia and the United States. A Bloomberg article said that the anti-Mainland Chinese rhetoric translated into violence on both sides. As a result, Mainlanders in Hong Kong stopped speaking Mandarin in public for fear of being targeted for abuse. From January to March 2020, the Equal Opportunities Commission reported nearly 600 inquiries and complaints about restaurants and other businesses refusing to serve mainland Chinese or Mandarin speakers.

== Mainland China reactions ==
=== Official statements ===
==== Allegations of foreign interference ====
The government has accused foreign forces of interfering with domestic affairs, and supporting the protesters; the accusations have in turn been criticised by those accused and third party observers. Bonnie Glaser of the Center for Strategic and International Studies said that there was a "long-standing tradition" of Beijing blaming external forces during domestic demonstrations or unrest.

On 29 July, the Hong Kong and Macao Affairs Office held its first press conference since the handover in which the spokesperson blamed the protests on the West and reiterated its support for Hong Kong, saying, "The central government firmly supports Carrie Lam leading the Hong Kong government's administration according to law, firmly supports the Hong Kong police strictly enforcing rule of law." The conference was in turn criticised by pro-democracy figures.

In September, the Foreign Ministry called a meeting between Joshua Wong and the German Foreign Minister as "disrespectful of China's sovereignty and an interference in China's internal affairs". The meeting came after German Chancellor Angela Merkel's trip to the PRC, where she said that the rights and freedoms of people in Hong Kong "must be guaranteed" and to whom Wong had written an open letter seeking her backing for the protests.

==== Reactions to the protesters ====
On 12 August, Yang Guang, a spokesman for the Hong Kong and Macao Affairs Office, stated "radical protesters" have "repeatedly attacked police officers in the past few days and have committed serious violent crimes", which "has begun to show the 'first signs of terrorism'". In response to the protests on 13 August, state media stated that "Hong Kong protesters are 'asking for self-destruction.'"

On 20 August, the Chinese Foreign Ministry sent a letter to more than 30 overseas media outlets in Beijing including BBC, NBC, Bloomberg, The Wall Street Journal, and NHK, requesting them to follow the Chinese government's position on Hong Kong affairs. The letter was described by Bloomberg as an attempt by the PRC government to "reshape the global narrative over Hong Kong."

After the implementation of the anti-mask law, Hong Kong and Macau Affairs Office stated that the move was "extremely necessary", while several state-run media has praised the move.

Xi Jinping, General Secretary of the Chinese Communist Party, has supported Hong Kong police to "take forceful actions in enforcing the law," and called Hong Kong judiciary to "punish in accordance with the law those who have committed violent crimes".

Zhang Xiaoming, director of the Hong Kong and Macau Affairs Office under the State Council, cited Article 23 of the Basic Law and supported the national security law to stop the protests.

==== Customs changes ====
Chinese government has required goods mailed from mainland China to Hong Kong to be investigated while goods which are believed as related to the protests are forbidden to mailing.

=== National security law ===
In May 2020, China announced that the Standing Committee of the National People's Congress (NPCSC), China's rubber-stamp legislative body, would directly draft a national security law that covers "secession, foreign interference, terrorism and subversion against the central government" into the Annex III of the Hong Kong Basic Law. The legislation of this law in the NPCSC used a legal backdoor that skips the local legislation procedures. Beijing's decision did not align with Article 23 of the Basic Law, Hong Kong's mini-institution which states that the legislation of a law concerning national security should be done by the local legislative body. This came at a time when Hong Kong had implemented a coronavirus law banning public gathering more than eight people, meaning that large-scale protests were less likely to occur.

Zhang Yesui, the spokesperson of the NPCSC stated that the implementation of such law is "highly necessary". Political analysts believed that Beijing's action would mark the end of the "one country, two systems" principle and Hong Kong's autonomy, as promised in the Sino-British Joint Declaration. Observers predicted that it would undermine Hong Kong's status as an international finance center and prompt civilians and capital to flee the city, as well as undermining any chance to mend the huge political divide in the city as the new law is likely to fuel further anger and protests.

=== State media ===
==== Allegations of foreign interference ====
In early August 2019, CCTV, Ta Kung Pao, and Wen Wei Po, alleged collusion between the United States and the Hong Kong protests when they published articles which included a photo of an American diplomat whom they accused of contributing to civil unrest, meeting in Hong Kong with leaders of Demosistō including Joshua Wong and Nathan Law and other pro-democracy figures including Anson Chan and Martin Lee. Ta Kung Pao also published personal details about the diplomat's family, including photos and the names of her children and husband. The US State Department condemned the action and rebuked China for violating the Vienna Convention. Morgan Ortagus called the Chinese government a "thuggish regime" and said that, as "Chinese authorities know full well", diplomats of every country meet with opposition figures as part of their job.

The Beijing state-run media have accused foreign forces of interfering with domestic affairs, and supporting the protesters; the accusations have in turn been criticised by those accused and third party observers.

==== Reactions to the protesters ====
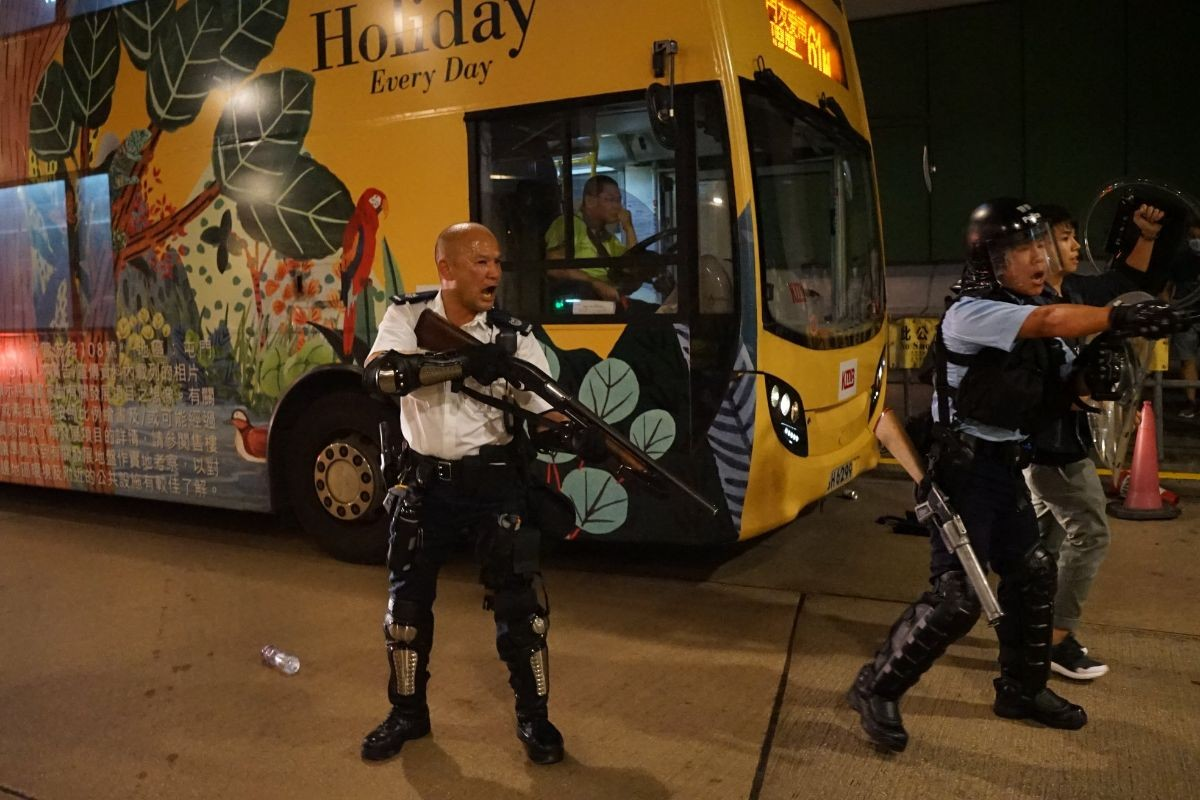
Police officer Lau Chak-kei was hailed as "hero" by Chinese media after he pointed a loaded shotgun at protesters.

The protests have been depicted by state media as separatist riots facilitated by foreign forces. A law professor at Nanchang Hangkong University was investigated by the university and faced "serious punishment" after his chat messages that appeared to support the Hong Kong protesters leaked online.

China Central Television covered the LegCo occupation of 1 July, and claimed the action was "condemned by people from all walks of life in Hong Kong". China Daily said of 20 July counter-demonstration that "the silent majority of Hong Kong has every reason to come out and defend their home". Following the 10 August protests and weekend airport sit-ins, People's Daily disseminated an article via WeChat that portrayed protesters as the instigators of violence. The article stated that there is broad call from Hong Kong society to make the city safe again by ending "violent demonstrations".

The Chinese media praised the police for being "restrained" on the day after a protester was shot in Sai Wan Ho on 12 November, and demanded the police to conduct more "forceful" actions. Chinese media and netizens also hailed the police, and in particular, Lau Chak-kei, the station sergeant who aimed his shotgun at protesters in Kwai Chung in July, as heroes. Lau, as the "bald police sergeant", was depicted in pro-establishment memes and subsequently became a prominent social media figure, particularly in the view of pro-establishment internet users. During the Siege of the Hong Kong Polytechnic University, Hu Xijin, the editor-in-chief of Global Times suggested the police to use sniper rifles to shoot the protesters, and that "if the rioters are killed, the police should not have to bear legal responsibility".

Hu denounced Harbour City and its owner Wharf Real Estate Investment after notices banning police entry into the mall were displayed. Hu criticized the mall operator of not "protecting" the Chinese flag after it was torn down by protesters, who subsequently threw it into the sea. This led to online calls to boycott the mall on Weibo. After the flag was thrown into the sea, China Central Television posted on Sina Weibo, saying that "China's national flag has 1.4 billion flag bearers". The state-controlled television broadcaster then urged netizens to share the post and declare themselves a "flag-bearer". This has attracted several Hong Kong celebrities, including Jackie Chan and Jordan Chan.

State media has said that the education system of Hong Kong has been advocating the protests directly or indirectly, while suggesting punishments for pro-protests teachers and promoting the Moral and National Education. Chinese state-run media have downplayed the results of the 2019 Hong Kong local elections.

On 22 August, Inkstone News reported that People's Daily and the Communist Youth League promoted anti-protests rap songs released by CD Rev. In December 2019, Global Times reported on a mobile game named Fight the Traitors Together, where players can beat up Hong Kong protesters and activists including Joshua Wong and Nathan Law with various weapons such as baseball bats and flip-flops.

==== Advertisements ====
In August, Twitter and Facebook published ads paid for by several different Chinese state media outlets, including Xinhua. The ad campaign targeted users in Hong Kong with "sponsored" content posted to the Twitter feed, speaking negatively of the protests and warning of economic troubles. On 19 August, Twitter posted an update about new advertising standards: "Going forward, we will not accept advertising from state-controlled news media entities ... that are either financially or editorially controlled by the state." Additionally, more than a dozen Facebook ads targeted for the US audience have been paid for by CGTN. Facebook has stated that they would continue to promote state-sponsored advertising. An insider with the company said that China purchases Facebook advertising worth "hundreds of thousands of dollars" each fiscal quarter, making China the largest client in Asia, though the social network is banned within mainland China and unavailable to residents.

=== Corporate pressure ===
In early August 2019, online campaigns on social media network Sina Weibo called for boycotts against Taiwanese bubble tea chain Yifang. The mainland office of the Japanese soft drink brand Pocari Sweat distanced itself from its Hong Kong division after the Hong Kong division publicly stopped advertising on the television network TVB, which pro-democracy protestors accused of being pro-Beijing. In early August 2019, online campaigns on Sina Weibo called for boycotts against Taiwanese bubble tea chain Yifang.

On 8 August 2019, Chinese authorities pressured Hong Kong's main airline Cathay Pacific to suspend staff members who participated in the anti-extradition protests, and ban staff members from being part of any flights to China. Chinese officials further demanded that the airline must submit for prior approval the names of all crew members flying to Chinese cities or flying through Chinese airspace. Some staff voiced disagreement about Beijing's recent moves and the then-chairman John Slosar defended his staff saying in a press statement that "We employ 27,000 people in Hong Kong ... we obviously do not imagine telling them what they have to think about certain subjects." Amid the pressure from Beijing, Cathay Pacific's CEO Rupert Hogg and chief customer and commercial officer Paul Loo both resigned on 16 August 2019; an article in CBS described Hogg's resignation as "the highest-profile corporate casualty of official Chinese pressure on companies to support the ruling Communist Party's position." The actions by Beijing on the airline has in turn been criticised by current and former Cathay Pacific staff members and the Hong Kong Confederation of Trade Unions. After People's Daily condemned the MTR Corporation for providing transport for the protesters, MTR shut down all its station ahead of a legal, authorized march on 24 August in Kwun Tong. MTR then subsequently became a target of vandalism after it was accused of kowtowing to Beijing's pressure.

On 2 September 2019, People's Daily denounced the Facebook posts of Garic Kwok, the director of Hong Kong mooncake brand Taipan Bread and Cake, for supporting the protests. The next day, products from the brand were removed from both e-commerce sites and stores in mainland China.

=== Social media ===
==== Censorship ====
The first two weeks of protests were largely ignored by central mainland media outlets, with no major stories published until 17 April. The protests were mostly censored from mainland Chinese social media, such as Sina Weibo. Keyword searches of "Hong Kong", "HK" and "extradition bill" led to other official news and entertainment news. Accounts that posted content regarding the protest were also blocked. By 14 June, censors were said to be working overtime to erase or block news of the protests on social media. On Sina Weibo and WeChat, the term "let's go Hong Kong" was blocked with the platform citing "relevant laws, regulations and policies" as the reason for not showing search results.

After Carrie Lam formally withdrew the extradition bill, many Chinese netizens expressed their disappointment for Lam's decision. However, most of the comments on Sina Weibo, including those from high-profile state media outlets, were removed later, while the hashtag #Carrie Lam formally withdraws the extradition bill# was removed.

Chinese online stores including Taobao removed Animal Crossing: New Horizons from sales after it was used by activist Joshua Wong as a platform to protest during the COVID-19 pandemic. Wong said he received death threats from Chinese netizens.

==== Disinformation ====
On 19 August, both Twitter and Facebook announced that they had discovered what they described as large-scale disinformation campaigns operating on their social networks. Facebook claimed that images and videos of protesters were altered and taken out of context, often with captions intended to vilify democracy activists and their cause.

According to investigations by Facebook, Twitter, and YouTube, some of the astroturfing activities were coordinated state-backed operations that were traced to the Chinese government. Twitter identified a core group of nearly 1,000 "fake" accounts, along with an extended spam network of 200,000 accounts, all of which were "proactively suspended"; Twitter released two data sets disclosing the core group's account and tweet information. Facebook removed a network of seven pages, three groups (including one with 15,500 followers), and five accounts (including one with 2,200 members) in response to its findings. On 22 August, Google stated it had disabled 210 YouTube channels involved in "coordinated influence operations" around the Hong Kong protests, "consistent with recent observations and actions related to China announced by Facebook and Twitter". It said it "found use of VPNs and other methods to disguise the origin" of the accounts.

Chinese Ministry of Foreign Affairs spokesperson Geng Shuang suggested that the activity could be attributed to overseas Chinese citizens, and stated that they "have the rights to express their opinions and viewpoints". NPR reported that the vast majority of the Twitter accounts were "disguised as personal or corporate accounts of marketing firms, international relations experts or bitcoin enthusiasts", and found a combined ¥2 million of Chinese government tenders dated 16 and 19 August for Facebook and Twitter accounts. In Bloomberg Opinion, Adam Minter wrote that "the vast majority of content tweeted by these accounts wasn't related to Hong Kong and – most important – failed to generate retweets, likes or responses". Comparing the Russian online propaganda effort with China's, Adam Segal of the Council on Foreign Relations says "the Chinese use of it has tended to be limited to issues that the Chinese consider being internal issues or sovereignty issues."

The International Cyber Policy Centre at the Australian Strategic Policy Institute released a study on 3 September, which analysed the data set released by Twitter. The report, Tweeting through the Great Firewall, found that prior to the 2019 Hong Kong protests, many of the now-banned Twitter accounts were engaged in attacks on critics of the Chinese government. Over 38,000 tweets from 618 accounts targeted Chinese billionaire Guo Wengui. Groups of these Twitter accounts had also coordinated efforts to criticise human rights lawyer Yu Wensheng and book publisher Gui Minhai. In April, 112 of the accounts posted a total of 1,600 tweets critical of the 2019 anti-extradition bill protests. Overall, the report found that the purported disinformation campaign had three main narratives: condemnation of protesters, support for Hong Kong Police, as well as "conspiracy theories about Western involvement in the protests."

=== Cyberattacks ===
Cyberattacks also occurred during the 2014 Umbrella Revolution. Security researchers believe China's Ministry of State Security was responsible for targeting democracy activists with sophisticated malware and spyware attacks that infected Android and iOS devices. The intelligence agency was also linked to powerful denial of service attacks aimed at CloudFlare and Internet voting systems and websites that enabled a grassroots civic referendum.

The Chinese government has denied that they engaged in cyberwarfare operations. According to a spokesperson from the Ministry of Foreign Affairs, China has "always advocated that the international community should jointly safeguard the security of cyberspace through dialogue and cooperation."

=== Military ===
An article published by the AFP on 30 July said that "Videos falsely claiming to show a Chinese military crackdown against pro-democracy protesters in Hong Kong have flooded social media over the past week." One of the debunked posts appeared shortly after a press conference attended by a mainland Chinese defence ministry spokesman that showed the People's Liberation Army entering Hong Kong; in reality, the video used in the post to purportedly show the crackdown was actually of Chinese military vehicles driving through the Hong Kong district of Kowloon in 2018.

On 30 July, Bloomberg News reported that a senior White House official had leaked information about a potential Chinese military buildup along the Hong Kong border.

On 31 July, the People's Liberation Army (PLA) distributed a video, which was posted via the Hong Kong garrison's official Sina Weibo social media account. In the opening scenes, a soldier shouts in Cantonese "All consequences are at your own risk!" The video shows heavily armed troops shooting at mock citizen actors and making arrests; there are also depictions of tanks, helicopters, rocket launchers, automatic weapons, and water cannons being deployed in urban areas. The film closes with quotes from civilians, stating "The discipline of the military is very good" and "The PLA and people of Hong Kong are integrated." The video was criticised by the Taiwanese Ministry of Foreign Affairs and users on LIHKG. Another video was released on 6 August in which the People's Armed Police conducted what state media said was an anti-riot drill in Shenzhen. An article by the AFP said that the exercise "instantly attracted online attention given the close resemblance between the drill and the ongoing clashes in adjacent Hong Kong."

On 16 November, approximately 50 unarmed PLA soldiers in T-shirts and shorts emerged from their barracks to clean up debris from violent clashes between protestors and police near Hong Kong Polytechnic University. A Reuters article said that the presence of the soldiers on the streets, even to clean up, risked "stoking controversy about Hong Kong's status as an autonomous area."

== Taiwan reactions ==
In June 2019, President Tsai Ing-wen backed the protesters and said that as long as she remains the president, the "one country, two systems" principle can never be an option for Taiwan's future. Later, after the suspension of the extradition bill, the Ministry of Foreign Affairs criticised the Hong Kong government for using Taiwan's unwillingness to extradite the suspect in the criminal case which the Hong Kong government had used to justify the extradition bill. The Foreign Minister of the Republic of China, Wu Zhaozheng, said that Taiwan would speak out if the Chinese or the Hong Kong government tried to suppress protesters with violence, and that the international community should not tolerate Beijing's crackdown on the protests.

The ruling Democratic Progressive Party later issued a statement on Facebook on 12 August strongly condemning the violent acts of Beijing and the Hong Kong government across the moral bottom line. It rendered statements by Tsai Ing-wen and relevant government units that Taiwan will provide assistance in individual cases in the form of humanitarian rescue. President of the Executive Yuan Su Zhenchang later stated that the Republic of China cares about Hong Kong and gives the necessary care. On the one hand, it must guard Taiwan's sovereignty and freedom and democracy, so that Taiwan will not be violently suppressed for democracy and freedom like Hong Kong.

In opposition parties, the Legislative Yuan party group including the Chinese Kuomintang Party, Time Power, and the People First Party issued a statement on 17 June in conjunction with the ruling party, calling on the Hong Kong government to respect the people's demands and to withdraw the fugitives bill, and disagreeing the Hong Kong government's use of force. In dealing with the mass movement, it called on the Hong Kong government to face the demands of the masses humbly and to minimise conflict. Chinese Nationalist Chairman Wu Dunyi issued a statement, hoping that the Hong Kong Government and mainland China will establish a communication channel with the protesters as soon as possible, seek consensus, and let the dispute end peacefully. Repeated clashes have also caused many Taiwanese to question the Chinese Communist Party, boosting the popularity of President Tsai Ing-wen, who went on to win the Democratic primary election.

== International reactions ==
=== Countries ===
In light of the ongoing protests, several countries issued travel warnings to Hong Kong.

==== Australia ====
Foreign Minister Marise Payne said at the end of June 2019 that "(We) support the people's right to demonstrate peacefully and exercise their right to freedom of expression, and we call on all parties to exercise restraint and avoid violence." Prime Minister Scott Morrison has questioned mainland officials' claims that terrorist demonstrations have emerged in Hong Kong. He said at a press conference in August 2019 that Carrie Lam must listen carefully to the voice of the protesters in order to resolve the dispute. The first Hong Kong-born member of parliament Gladys Liu also supported the protesters and called for peaceful dialogue to resolve the dispute. After the government announced that it would withdraw the motion, the opposition Labor Party Senate Leader Penny Wong welcomed the decision, but also called on the government to respond to the remaining four major appeals.

==== Canada ====
The Office of the Minister of Foreign Affairs issued a statement on 12 June stating that Canada has been following up on this bill, and Canada reaffirmed that this demonstration was one of the largest demonstrations in history to show the public's attention to the bill. Stating that "Canada remains concerned about this bill as it has a potential impact on Canadian business confidence in Hong Kong and Hong Kong's international reputation. The statement calls on the Hong Kong Government to listen to the voices of citizens and the international community while safeguarding a high degree of autonomy and an independent judicial system."

Prime Minister Justin Trudeau said he was very concerned on the situation between Hong Kong and mainland China and called on China to bring peace, order and dialogue, stating: "we certainly call on China to be very careful and very respectful in how it deals with people who have legitimate concerns in Hong Kong."

==== France ====
French Foreign Minister Jean-Yves Le Drian called on Hong Kong authorities to renew talks with protesters to find a peaceful solution to the current crisis.

==== Germany ====
German Chancellor Angela Merkel's spokesman, Steffen Seibert, said in June 2019 that it was a good sign that the majority of protesters have been peaceful "and we appeal to all concerned to ensure that things remain just as peaceful in Hong Kong". Merkel said in August 2019 that she hoped to end the conflict through friendly dialogue. It also means that the Constitution (Basic Law) and the protection of residents' freedom must be at the core of any dialogue.

==== Iran ====
Homejra Assadi, spokeswoman of Football Federation of Iran (FFI) urged FIFA to move a World Cup qualifier match against Hong Kong to a neutral venue from Hong Kong due to concerns over ongoing protests and citing safety fears from political unrest. Foreign Minister spokesperson Abbas Mousavi, has denounced the US' Hong Kong Human Rights and Democracy Act as US intervention, though the protests themselves are local.

==== Israel ====
The Israeli Foreign Minister has urged its citizens living in Hong Kong to refrain from partaking in the protests for safety and security reasons.

==== Japan ====
Prime Minister Shinzo Abe has cautioned Xi Jinping over recent turmoil in Hong Kong at the G20 Summit. Abe told Xi it was important for "a free and open Hong Kong to prosper under 'one country, two systems' policy".

==== Malaysia ====
Responding to a question from Hong Kong Bar Association chairman Philip Dykes, Prime Minister Mahathir Mohamad said he was of the opinion that Carrie Lam should resign as the chief executive, fearing a repeat of the 1989 Tiananmen Square protests and massacre where mainland China's authorities used soldiers from other regions to take harsh action towards the protesters since they knew the soldiers in the area would be hindered in doing so, as many of them had relatives among the protesters. He added that Lam already knew "the consequences of rejecting [the extradition] law" as herself was in a dilemma when she has to obey her Mainland masters. Early in September, a supposed football friendly match between Hong Kong and Malaysia to be held in Hong Kong Stadium in So Kon Po was cancelled due to security fears from the Malaysian sides over the protests.

==== New Zealand ====
Prime Minister Jacinda Ardern defended the right of pro-Hong Kong protesters to freedom of expression on New Zealand university campuses. In response to the travel disruption caused by protest action, MFAT has also issued a travel advisory for New Zealanders travelling to Hong Kong. Deputy Prime Minister and Foreign Minister Winston Peters expressed his admiration for the courage of Hong Kong demonstrators in June and said that one country, two systems must be respected. On 14 August 2019, the Ministry of Foreign Affairs and Trade said that an economic plan has been formulated due to the worsening conditions in Hong Kong and that New Zealanders in Hong Kong should be evacuated when necessary.

==== North Korea ====
North Korean Foreign Minister Ri Yong-ho said that, "North Korea fully supports the stand and measures of China to defend the sovereignty, security and territorial integrity of the country and safeguard the prosperity and stability of Hong Kong, and concerns about foreign forces interference in Hong Kong issue."

==== Pakistan ====
The Pakistani Ministry of Foreign Affairs stated, "Pakistan believes Hong Kong's affairs are China's internal affairs and we believe stability and prosperity in Hong Kong would soon resume. We also believe that all countries should uphold international law and the basic norms of non-interference in the internal affairs of other countries."

==== Philippines ====
In August 2019, Philippine President Rodrigo Duterte urged all sides to show restraint and Labor Secretary Silvestre Bello stated that the situation is being monitored to assess if there is a need to suspend deployment of Overseas Filipino Workers to Hong Kong following the arrest of a Filipino migrant worker suspected to be involved in the protest.

==== Serbia ====
Marko Djuric, vice president of the ruling Serbian Progressive Party, accused the protests of being "hijacked by foreign forces to weaken China" & the "violence" of being "fascism" when criticising the Hong Kong Human Rights and Democracy Act passed unanimously by the U.S. Congress.

==== Singapore ====
Singaporean Prime Minister Lee Hsien Loong said that the protests were a "difficult issue" and hoped that both Hong Kong and the PRC would overcome the difficulties. During an interview with Forbes, Lee criticised that the protestors' Five Demands as not meant to resolve problems, but as an attempt to "humiliate and bring down the government". In March 2020, Minister of Home Affairs K. Shanmugan said the protests "severely damaged" the relationship between the Hong Kong police and the public, bringing up that some protestors were violent towards both police and residents who tried to go against them. He added that this was not helped by the "one-sided portrayal of the situation" by international media. Singapore had reportedly been crafting contingency plans in case the Hong Kong protests inspire unrest in the country.

According to the Hong Kong Free Press in November 2019, some Chinese-Singaporeans have expressed a general disdain for the protests, often using social media to voice their objections.

==== South Korea ====
According to various Chinese state-affiliated media, President Moon Jae-in stated that affairs relating to Hong Kong and Xinjiang are China's internal affairs. However, South Korean government denied reports from Chinese media.

==== United Kingdom ====
In mid-July at Chatham House, former Prime Minister Theresa May stated that the Sino-British Joint Declaration "needs to be abided by and continue to be respected" by China. Foreign Secretary Dominic Raab condemned "violent acts by all sides" but emphasized the right to peaceful protest, noting that "hundreds of thousands of Hong Kong people had chosen this route to express their views," and was met by criticism by the Hong Kong authorities. The London government has expressed that the actions of "a hard-core minority cannot be condoned." regarding allegations of violence at the otherwise peaceful rallies Chris Patten, Hong Kong's last governor, described Lam's decision to implement the anti-mask law as "crazy" and that should Lam continue to refuse to engage in dialogue, people may get killed by the police in subsequent conflicts.

A former employee of the British consulate in Hong Kong, Simon Cheng, reported in an interview with the BBC that he had been tortured by Chinese officials during his 15-day detention in China in August 2019.He had first been detained by mainland officials on 8 August at the immigration checkpoint of West Kowloon station for allegedly "soliciting prostitutes". According to Cheng, his captors, who he believed to be secret police, called him "a British spy and secret agent", and subjected him to torture in what he called a "tiger chair" to make him confess that he had been instigating unrest in Hong Kong on behalf of the British government. Cheng's statements were deemed credible by UK government sources. Foreign Secretary Dominic Raab released a statement saying that he was "outraged by the disgraceful mistreatment". In response to the political and media backlash, Chinese state media later released footage of the confession of Cheng, and CCTV footage of him entering and leaving a clubhouse. Cheng stated that he had made the confession after he had been threatened by China's police that he would otherwise not be able to contact his family and be detained indefinitely. Cheng was granted asylum in the UK on 26 June 2020.

==== United States ====
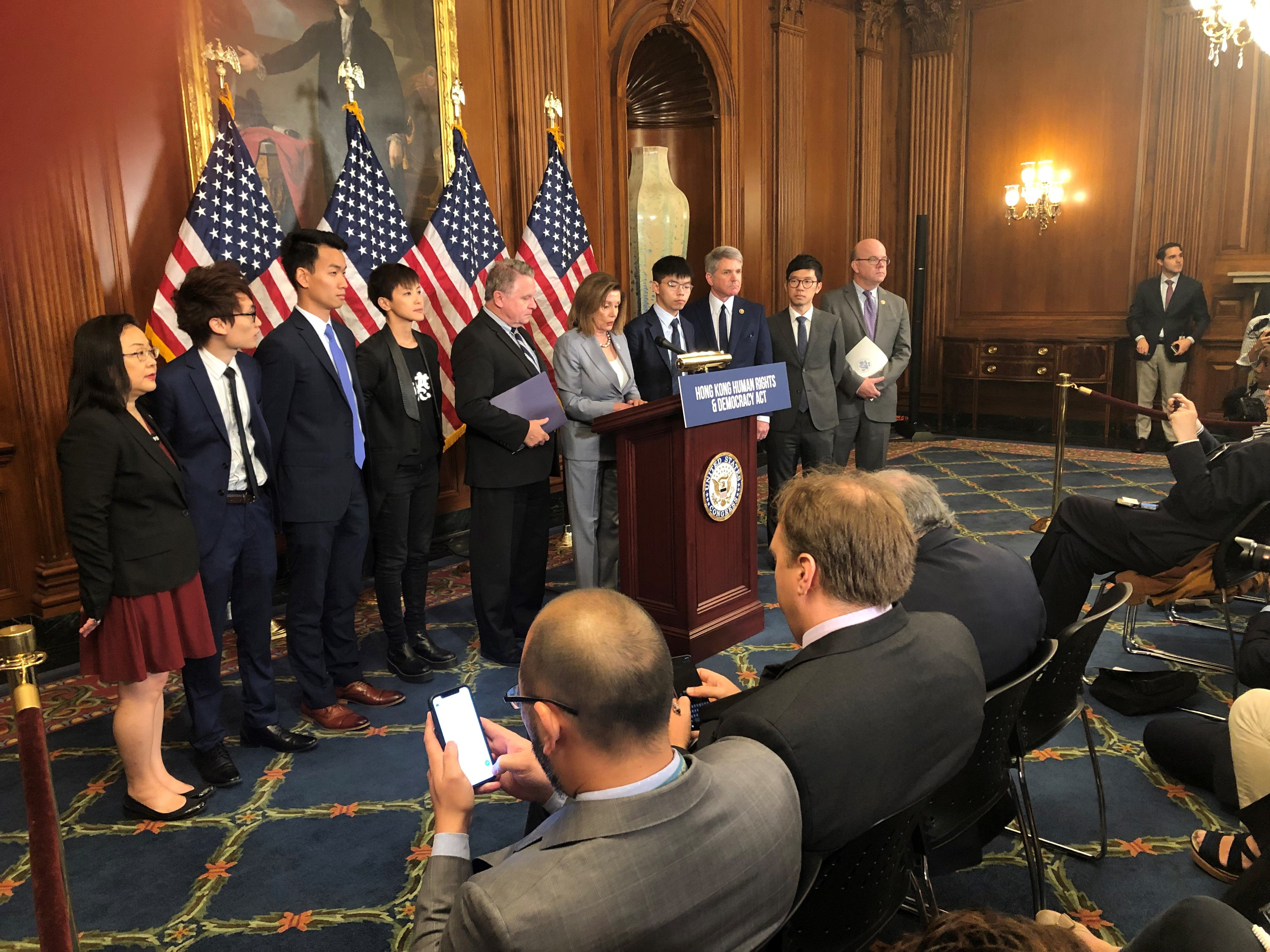
House Democratic leader Nancy Pelosi with Hong Kong activists who have become prominent figures in the protests

According to CNN and Financial Times reports, in June, President Donald Trump promised Chinese paramount leader Xi Jinping that the US would remain quiet on pro-democracy protests in Hong Kong while trade talks continued. Also in June, the State Department told then-US general counsel in Hong Kong, Kurt Tong, to cancel a planned speech on the protests in Washington.

On 1 August, President Donald Trump condemned the developing violence of the protests in calling the events "riots". He also said the US will not involve itself: "That's between Hong Kong and that's between China, because Hong Kong is a part of China." In response, a bipartisan group of senators issued a statement to Trump, condemning "Beijing's efforts to undermine Hong Kong's autonomy". In the letter, they declared "Hong Kong's governance is not China's internal affair" and that if the U.S. fails to respond to Beijing's threats it would "only encourage Chinese leaders to act with impunity". Trump administration officials said the day after that the president had no intention to signal a policy change or an endorsement of China's position. On 19 August, after the massive protest in the day before, Trump warned China to solve the problem in a humanitarian fashion, saying, "It would be much harder for me to sign a deal if he did something violent in Hong Kong".

The Speaker of the House of Representatives, Nancy Pelosi, met with Hong Kong activist Joshua Wong on Capitol Hill in Washington on 18 September. Chinese media criticized her sharply for this meeting, accusing her of "backing and encouraging radical activists." She called the protests in Hong Kong "a beautiful sight to behold." Pelosi said: "If America does not speak out for human rights in China because of commercial interests, we lose all moral authority to speak out elsewhere."

The United States House of Representatives unanimously passed the Hong Kong Human Rights and Democracy Act through a voice vote on 15 October 2019. On 14 November 2019, senators Jim Risch and Marco Rubio began a process for the United States Senate to pass the legislation. In November 2019, a version of the bill was also unanimously confirmed in the United States Senate in a voice vote with amendments that differ between the two versions. However, the two chambers of Congress need to work out the differences between the two versions of the legislation before it can be sent to President Donald Trump for approval. The Bill has since been fully approved and signed by President Donald Trump.

Various U.S. Senators have expressed disapproval of corporate decisions related to the protests, including Apple's removal of the HKmap.live application from the App Store as well as video game developer and publisher Blizzard's suspension of an esports athlete from competing in events.

==== Vietnam ====
The Vietnamese Ministry of Foreign Affairs had stated that the protests are China's internal affairs.

=== International Organisations ===
==== United Nations ====
Michelle Bachelet, United Nations High Commissioner for Human Rights stated that "We are troubled by the high levels of violence associated with some demonstrations that have been taking place in the past days", and "Freedom of peaceful assembly ... should be enjoyed without restriction to the greatest extent possible. But on the other hand, we cannot accept people who use masks to provoke violence." She also demanded the Hong Kong government to conduct "prompt, independent, impartial investigation" on the police's use of force against the protesters.

On 12 September 2019, UN experts expressed concern surrounding the violent and forceful suppression of peaceful protests. They commented how despite their condemnation of the sporadic violence in the then-ongoing protests, the government must "distinguish violent elements from peaceful protesters, who must be free to express their views."

==== European Union ====
The European External Action Service said rights "need to be respected" in Hong Kong on 12 June: "Over the past days, the people of Hong Kong have exercised their fundamental right to assemble and express themselves freely and peacefully. These rights need to be respected".

==== International Trade Union Confederation ====
The International Trade Union Confederation issued a statement on 17 August 2019, calling on its 331 trade union organisations from 163 countries to protest to the embassies of the People's Republic of China and demand that the Hong Kong government release the arrested people and independently investigate human rights violations.

==== G7 ====
45th Group of Seven meeting organised after the closing of the Group of Seven organisations issued a joint statement reaffirming the Sino-British Joint Declaration existence and importance to Hong Kong and asked to avoid violence.

=== Solidarity protests ===
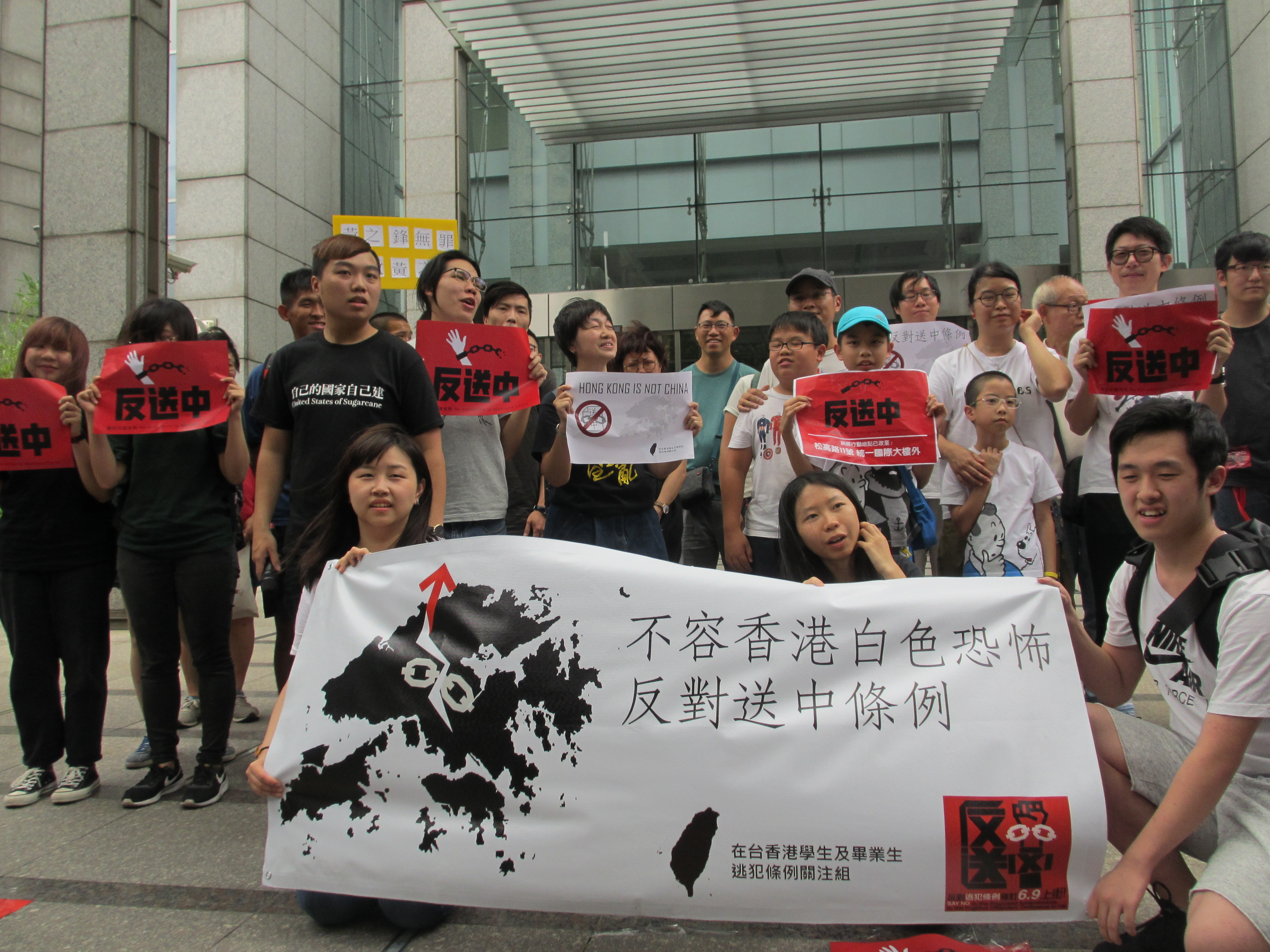
Taiwan activists protest against extradition bill in Taipei, Taiwan.

On 9 June, at least 29 rallies were held in 12 countries with protesters taking to the streets in cities around the world with significant Hong Kong diaspora, including about 4,000 in London, about 3,000 in Sydney and further rallies in New York City, San Francisco, Los Angeles, Boston, Toronto, Vancouver, Berlin, Frankfurt, Tokyo, Perth, Canberra, Melbourne, Brisbane and Taipei. In one of the biggest overseas protests, hundreds of demonstrators made of mostly Hong Kong immigrants filled the streets outside the Chinese consulate-general in Vancouver with yellow umbrellas, referencing the 2014 Occupy protests, and chanted against the extradition law. More than 60 people gathered outside the White House in Washington to protest against the bill.

On 12 June, representatives from 24 Taiwanese civic groups, including Taiwan Association for Human Rights, protested outside Hong Kong's representative office in Taipei, whilst shouting slogans such as "Taiwan supports Hong Kong."

On 16 June, 10,000 Hong Kong students and Taiwanese supporters held a peaceful sit-in at the Legislative Yuan in Taipei to support the protests in Hong Kong. In Auckland and Adelaide, around 500 people gathered to demand Chief Executive Lam to withdraw the bill and apologise for her actions. On 17 June, 1,500 people protested outside the Chinese Consulate in Vancouver.

On 23 June, 5,000 people held a rally in Taipei against Hong Kong's extradition bill. On 14 July a "Sing for Hong Kong" event was held in London. There was a clash between pro-democracy and pro-China supporters at the University of Queensland in Brisbane on 24 July. In response to the incident, the Chinese Consul-General in Brisbane, Xu Jie, reportedly praised Chinese students for confronting "anti-China separatist" protesters, prompting the Australian Foreign Minister Marise Payne to warn foreign diplomats not to interfere in free speech and protests in Australia.

On 3 August, further solidarity protests occurred in UK cities including London, Manchester and Edinburgh, as well as Canadian cities of Montreal, Vancouver, Toronto, Winnipeg, Halifax, Ottawa and Calgary. On 10 August, around 100 Hong Kongers, Tibetans, Taiwanese, Uygurs, overseas Chinese and other New York residents held a rally outside the Chinese consulate. Over the 16–18 August weekend, solidarity pro-democracy protests were held in London, Edinburgh, Melbourne, Sydney, Adelaide, Brisbane, Taipei, Berlin, Paris, Boston, Calgary, Vancouver and Toronto.

On 30 August, hundreds of Tibetans marched in India's capital in a show of solidarity with protesters in Hong Kong. Taking a cue from them, many of the Tibetans carried umbrellas and wore black as they joined the New Delhi demonstration organised by the Tibetan Youth Congress.

Protesters in the concurrent 2019 Catalan protests have claimed inspiration from, and solidarity with the Hong Kong protests.

On 13 November, Xi Jinping visited Brazil. A few hundred Brazilian protestors gathered in Brasília to show their support to the Hong Kong protestors.

=== Counter-protests ===
Simultaneously, counter-protests organized by pro-China and overseas mainland Chinese groups occurred in several cities in the Western hemisphere, including Sydney, Melbourne, Ottawa, Toronto, London, and Paris; some of which led to confrontations between the opposing groups and arrests. On 2 October 2019, a confrontation between rival student protesters at the University of Sheffield led to the arrest and suspension of one student.

== Other reactions ==
=== Macau ===
On 11 June, due to the events in Hong Kong, the Macau SAR Government said it will develop a wait-and-see approach, in regards to making their own extradition law with mainland China. Earlier many Macau lawyers agree in principle that an extradition with mainland China or Hong Kong is necessary, but the wording of such agreements would have to be carefully analysed. On 14 June, Macau Lawyers Association's President Jorge Neto Valente said that he supports the protesters against the proposed extradition law. He further stated that the best way to resolve the issue was to postpone the discussion of the bill.

=== eSports ===
Additionally, on 6 October 2019 the American video game developer and publisher Blizzard suspended Hong Kong player Chung Ng Wai's participation in a professional esports tournament of Hearthstone after attending an interview donned with a mask similar to those worn by protestors and uttering the phrase "Liberate Hong Kong, Revolution of our time," a slogan strongly associated with the protesters' demonstrations.

Lee Shi Tian, a Hong Kong citizen, showed solidarity with Hong Kong protestors during the broadcast of the Magic: The Gathering Mythic Championship V 18 October. Wizards of the Coast and their parent company Hasbro allowed broadcast of his comments and masked appearance.

=== National Basketball Association (NBA) ===
The Houston Rockets general manager Daryl Morey tweeted an image that stated "Fight for Freedom. Stand with Hong Kong" in October 2019. The NBA subsequently apologised saying the tweet was "regrettable" and the Chinese Basketball Association cut ties with the Rockets. which drew criticism from US politicians and third-party observers as well as mainland Chinese state-run media.

=== Journalism ===
==== Mainland China media ====
An August 2019 article in the Washington Post reported that mainland Chinese state-run media portrayed the protests as extremely violent demonstrations, plotted by "foreign hostile forces" including United States Speaker of the House Nancy Pelosi and the CIA. A September 2019 article published in the Index on Censorship said that China was spinning its version of the Hong Kong protests to control the news. A November 2019 article in Deutsche Welle said that mainland Chinese state run media reporting the Hong Kong protests had sharply criticized the protesters' actions and blamed Western media for what they said was its biased reporting. A June 2020 academic paper compared the discursive constructions of the Hong Kong protests in CNN and China Daily, saying that mainstream Chinese media supported China's bid to influence global opinion favorable to its undertakings.

Publications in 2019 from The Conversation, Financial Times, Jamestown Foundation, and The New York Times described mainland China's state-run media's reporting of the protests as disinformation and/or propaganda. Two articles in Quartz drew attention to the relationship between what it said were PRC and Russian propaganda campaigns and strategies.

==== Hong Kong media ====
The cover story of the Fall 2019 edition of Nieman Reports characterised the protests as a fight for a free press, noting the ways in which the city's independent news outlets adapted to an increasingly hostile media environment. In December 2019, a report by the committee to Protect Journalists documented the ways in which China undermined media freedom in Hong Kong during the protests as part of what the organization said was its attempt to preserve press freedom.

A December 2019 list that was published by the One Free Press Coalition which it said documented the month's most urgent cases of journalists whose press freedoms were under attack was topped by Sophia Xueqin Huang, a Chinese journalist who covered the protests in Hong Kong and was arrested in October 2019 on charges of "picking quarrels and provoking trouble."

In April 2020, global media watchdog Reporters Without Borders released the 2020 edition of the World Press Freedom Index, which showed Hong Kong dropping seven places from 73rd in 2019 to 80th because of what the organization said was the city's treatment of journalists during the demonstrations. An article in the Hong Kong Free Press said that the new ranking "marked a significant drop from 18th, where the city stood back when the index was created in 2002."

A May 2020 academic paper called the protests a "media-driven, tele-genic movement" with large numbers of amateur or citizen photojournalists and noted the democratic potential of the massification of Hong Kong journalism during the movement, but stated that the mass media also largely ignored the frequent use of racially charged epithets, occasional anti-Mandarin violence, and other fascistic and xenophobic dimensions of the movement.

A June 2020 opinion editorial by Reporters Without Borders criticized the passage of the Hong Kong national security law, with its secretary general calling for the world's democracies to take action to prevent Beijing from imposing the law that he said would be used as a means to prosecute journalists. Reuters reported that the law led to fears among Hong Kong's free media that they would be silenced and had echoes of China's own cyber crackdown.

In response to the August 2020 arrest of pro-democracy media entrepreneur Jimmy Lai, an article in The Conversation said that the incident heralded an uncertain future for the remaining independent media in the territory. The arrest also drew criticism from the Foreign Correspondents' Club of Hong Kong, the chairman of the Hong Kong Journalists Association, and the Asia program co-ordinator of the Committee to Protect Journalists.

==== Other international media ====
A September 2019 article from Asia Times reported that international media outside of China have been overwhelmingly sympathetic to the movement to the point of strengthening the Chinese government's desire to control Hong Kong.

A December 2019 report from the politically progressive media watchdog Fairness & Accuracy in Reporting (FAIR) said that US corporate media disproportionately focused on the Hong Kong protests with a single-minded narrative, while ignoring far more violent unrests around the world. Carrie Lam in a CNBC interview, as well as several Chinese media reports, cited the report as part of her accusation of foreign involvement behind the protests.

A May 2020 academic paper described the Western coverage of the anti-government protests and its influence on Western politics as an example of mediatisation. The study cited the political orientalism of Western media, the colonial heritage of Hong Kong, and the mainland Chinese media's clumsy dismissals of the protests as factors for the sympathy and attention given to the Hong Kong protestors by Western media.

According to an August 2021 Malaysiakini report, many articles published by mainstream Chinese language media in Malaysia about the protests were lifted from China state media and other pro-CCP media in Hong Kong, which contained elements of untruths. Such articles were shared by local audiences on the Malaysian Chinese Facebook, which was reportedly dominated by anti-protesters and pro-Beijing comments. Oriental Daily News editor Liew Hwei Yin responded to Malaysiakini's inquiry on the misleading reports of an alleged school bus attack, saying it was hard to verify information as journalists were not on scene and could only report based on what the local media there had reported. She added that her newsroom typically compiles news from different sources, including those at opposing ends of the political spectrum (like Apple Daily and Wen Wei Po), to let the readers make their own judgement.
