= Steven Cheung (disambiguation) =

Steven Cheung (born 1982) is an American political advisor.

Steven or Stephen Cheung may also refer to:

- Steven Cheung (entertainer) (born 1984), Hong Kong actor and member of the now disbanded boy band, Sun Boy'z
- Steven Cheung (British political candidate) (born 1989), Hong Kong-born British political activist
- Steven N. S. Cheung (born 1935), Hong Kong-born economist, specializes in transaction costs and property rights
- Stephen Cheung former President of the Education University of Hong Kong
