= 7-Man Army =

1976 Hong Kong film by Chang Cheh

- Theatrical release poster
- Directed by: Chang Cheh
- Written by: Ni Kuang; Chang Cheh
- Starring: Ti Lung; David Chiang; Alexander Fu; Chen Kuan-Tai
- Cinematography: Kung Mu-To
- Edited by: Kuo Ting-hung
- Music by: Chen Yung-Yu
- Production companies: Chang's Film; Shaw Brothers Studio
- Distributed by: Concorde Film (1977, Netherlands theatrical release)
- Release date: 16 April 1976 (Hong Kong)
- Running time: 100 minutes
- Country: Hong Kong
- Languages: Mandarin; Japanese

7-Man Army is a 1976 Hong Kong historical war action film directed by Chang Cheh and starring Ti Lung, David Chiang, Alexander Fu and Chen Kuan-Tai. It was written by Ni Kuang and Chang Cheh. Chan San-Yat and Hsieh Hsing were the action directors. The film is a dramatised account of the Defense of the Great Wall. It was filmed in Taiwan.

== Plot ==
In 1933, 20,000 Japanese troops and 50 tanks invade Badaolouzi, a strategic point along the Great Wall of China. The Defense of the Great Wall was one of the earliest battles, or "incidents," between Chinese and Japanese troops.

At Badaolouzi, which is held by the Japanese army, a battalion of the Chinese 25th Division is sandwiched between the fort and an incoming Japanese detachment. Pushed backwards, the Chinese strive to conquer the outpost but are cut down by the defenders' machine gun fire; only six men survive, overwhelm the garrison and occupy the fortress. They are shortly joined by Xiao Shunzi, a local youth who was orphaned in a bombing and voluntarily signs on as an orderly, and by Private First Class Jia Fusheng when the latter comes across the outpost while scouting the enemy's movements.

Cut off from their main force, Commander Wu Chaozheng decides to defend Badaolouzi in order to prevent their 2nd Division, who is engaging the main enemy force, from being encircled. Although heavily outnumbered, each one of the soldiers stays, mostly for their own personal motives. Wu does so for his sense of patriotism; Chu Tiancheng's wife was murdered by a band of Japanese ruffians after Chu had beaten them up; Jia Fusheng fights to avenge the death of Regimental Commander Wang, who was his instructor during basic training; Bai Changxing joined the army simply to make himself into a better husband for his much-abused wife; the family of He Hongfa, a Mongolian, was killed by Mongolian mercenaries working for the Japanese; Jiang Mingkun was the leader of a sword-fighting rebel band against the Japanese; and Pan Pinglin, a former opera actor, joined the army after beating up two Chinese pro-Japan sympathizers who harassed one of his female colleagues.

The next day, a band of Mongolian mercenaries arrive to secure Badaolouzi for the incoming Japanese forces. The seven soldiers fight them off, but some of them escape to inform the Japanese of the fortress' new occupants, and the following day a Japanese regiment attacks in force. Using hit-and-run tactics to balance their vastly inferior numbers, and their martial arts skills for close combat, the seven soldiers hold the enemy off for as long as they can, inflicting massive casualties. Eventually they are all overwhelmed and killed, but they defy the Japanese until the last, with Chu Tiancheng preventing the fortress' flagpost from being felled by bracing it even as he stiffens in death.

Impressed by the heroic sacrifice of the seven, the Japanese commander has them buried with full military honors. Shortly thereafter the Chinese main force arrives, forcing the Japanese to retreat. As the Chinese honor their fallen comrades, Xiao Shunzi joins them to serve his country and to relay the story of the seven's last battle.

== Cast ==
- Ti Lung as Battalion Commander Wu Chaozheng
- David Chiang as Private First Class Bai Changxing
- Chen Kuan-tai as Private Jiang Mingkun
- Alexander Fu Sheng as Private He Hongfa
- Chi Kuan Chun as Private Chu Tiancheng
- Yi-Min Li as Private Pan Binglin (credited as Lee I. Min)
- Pai Ying as Private First Class Jia Fusheng
- Ting Wa-Chung as Xiao Shunzi

== Historical basis ==
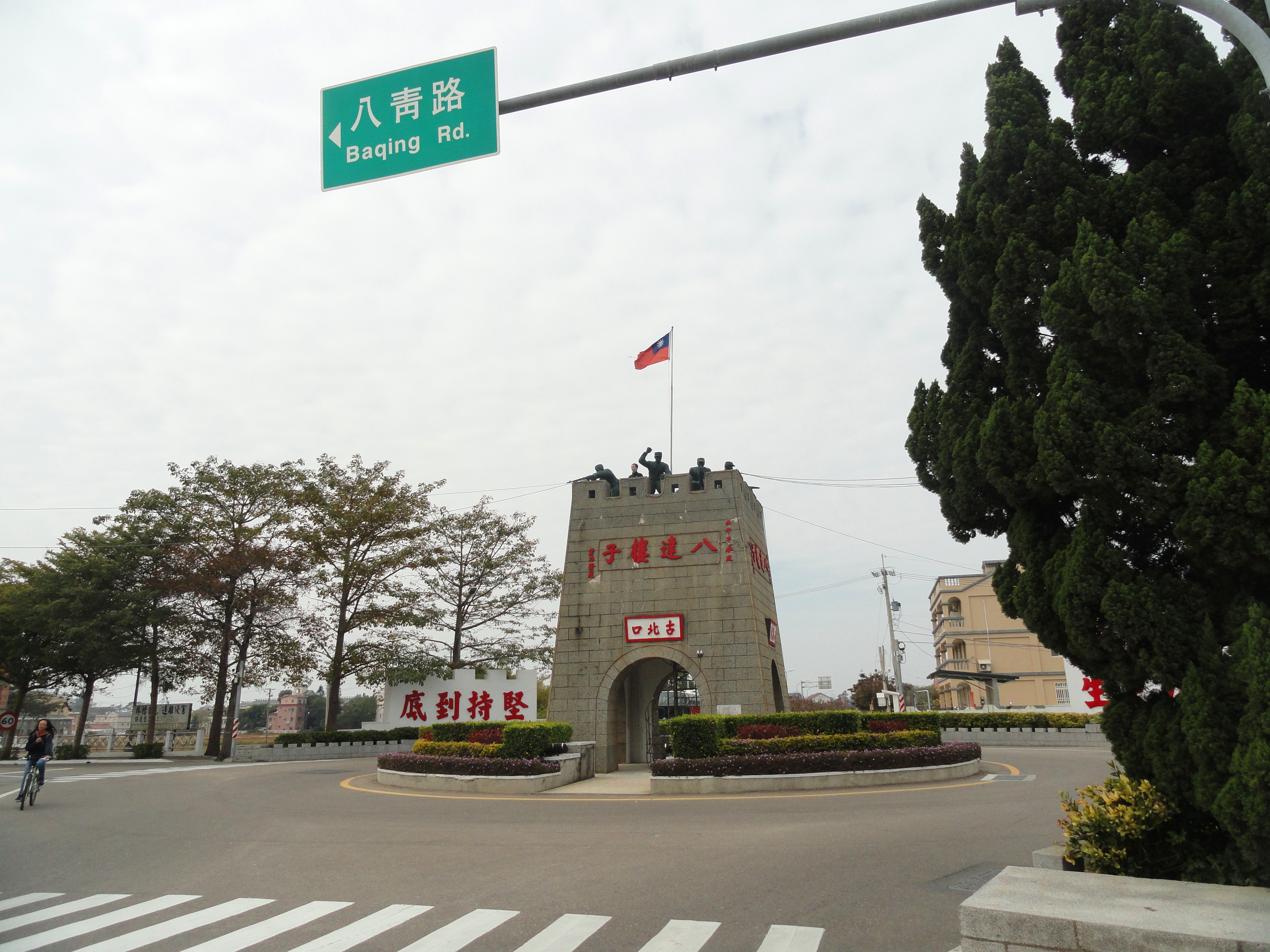
Bada Tower in Lieyu, Kinmen, Republic of China (Taiwan), commemorating the 7 fallen soldiers.

The battle depicted in the film was part of the defense of the Great Wall fought in April 1933 between National Revolutionary Army 17th Army and Imperial Japanese Army 8th Division, two years after the Mukden Incident and four years before the outbreak of the Second Sino-Japanese War. Specifically, the seven heroes perished in Badaolouzi (八道樓子; "Eighth Tower"), a section of the Great Wall of China in today's Gubeikou, Miyun County, Beijing. Their names are unknown since it was the Japanese who buried them and set up a steel titled "Seven Heroes of Shina", which was later discovered by Chinese soldiers under Liu Yuzhang. According to Liu, who was part of the 2nd Division commanded by Huang Chieh, the seven soldiers were most likely part of the 25th Division commanded by Guan Linzheng (due to Guan's injury, it was actually led by Guan's adjutant Du Yuming.)

Wu Chaozheng was an officer who died in the same battle. He belonged to the 2nd Division, and therefore was probably not one of the seven who died in Badaolouzi. Including Wu Chaozheng and the seven heroes, a total of 3,104 Chinese soldiers died during the 5-day period from April 20–25, 1933 in Gubeikou.
