= Wu Chaozheng =

- Born: 1905; Yongjia County, Zhejiang, Qing Empire
- Died: April 20, 1933 (aged 27–28); Gubeikou, Rehe, Republic of China
- Service / branch: (Republic of China (1912–1949)) National Revolutionary Army

Wu Chaozheng (Chinese: 吳超徵; 1905 – 20 April 1933) was a Chinese military officer in the National Revolutionary Army who died during the defense of the Great Wall, a military campaign against the Japanese. After his death, top Chinese leaders Chiang Kai-shek, T.V. Soong, Sun Fo, as well as top military brass Zhu Peide, Zhang Zhizhong, Cai Tingkai, Liu Zhi and his immediate leader Huang Chieh all wrote epitaphs in his memory.

Wu Chaozheng was a graduate of the Whampoa Military Academy.

== Legacy ==
In 2013, Wu Chaozheng Memorial Hall was built on the property of Wu Zuquan (Wu Chaozheng's son), in Qiaoxia Town (桥下), Yongjia County, Zhejiang, where Wu Chaozheng formerly lived. The hall covers 800 square metres (the building covers 310), and was built on a ¥750,000 budget.

== In fiction ==
Ti Lung stars as Wu Chaozheng in the 1976 Hong Kong film 7-Man Army, directed by Chang Cheh.
