= Stephen Cheung =

Hong Kong educational administrator

Prof Stephen Y.L. Cheung BBS JP
- 張仁良

1st President of Education University of Hong Kong
- In office 27 May 2016 – 31 August 2023
- Chancellor: Leung Chun-ying; Carrie Lam
- Vice President: Prof John Lee (Academic); Prof Tai-lok Lui (Research and Development); Sarah Wong (Administration)
- Preceded by: position established

Personal details
- Born: British Hong Kong
- Spouse: Chrisine Cappio
- Education: Chinese University of Hong Kong

Professor Stephen Cheung Yan-Leung, BBS, JP (Chinese: 張仁良) is the former President of the Education University of Hong Kong (EdUHK). He has presided over the institution since September 2013 before the Hong Kong Institute of Education (HKIEd) was renamed EdUHK when the Chief Executive in Council granted the institute a university title.

Cheung specialises in Corporate Finance, Investment and Financial Market Development. He has authored or co-authored over 100 publications, one of which won the Sun Yefang Financial Innovation Award in 2014. He was ranked the sixth most productive finance scholar in the Asia-Pacific Region in the 1990s. He is the President and Chair Professor of Public Policy.

He is a recipient of the Officier dans l'Ordre des Palmes Académiques.
